= 1949 Washington Senators season =

1949 Washington Senators
- League: American League
- Ballpark: Griffith Stadium
- City: Washington, D.C.
- Record: 50–104 (.325)
- League place: 8th
- Owners: Clark Griffith and the estate of George H. Richardson
- Managers: Joe Kuhel
- Television: WTTG (Arch McDonald, Bob Wolff, Howard Williams)
- Radio: WWDC (FM) (Arch McDonald, Bob Wolff, Howard Williams)

The 1949 Washington Senators, the 49th season of the Major League Baseball franchise, won 50 games, lost 104, and finished in eighth place in the American League. It was the worst showing by the Washington club in 40 years, since the 1909 Senators lost 110 games. The team was managed by Joe Kuhel; it played its home games at Griffith Stadium, where it drew 770,745 fans, seventh in the circuit.

The Senators actually won 25 of their first 45 games and stood in third place after Sunday, June 5, 1949. But they would win only 25 games more all season, playing at an abysmal .229 rate over their last 109 contests. In today's 162-game schedule, that would have resulted in a 37–125 mark, surpassing the 1962 Mets' record for futility. At year's end, manager Kuhel would be replaced by Bucky Harris, the Senators' 1924 "boy wonder" manager, now 53, returning for a third term as skipper of the Senators.

== Offseason ==
- October 4, 1948: John Sullivan, Tom Ferrick and $25,000 were traded by the Senators to the St. Louis Browns for Sam Dente.
- Prior to 1949 season: Jim Pearce was signed as a free agent by the Senators.

== Regular season ==
On September 28, Senators pitcher Ray Scarborough ended Ted Williams' streak of most consecutive games reaching base safely at 84 games. Scarborough gave up just four hits in a 4–1 complete game win over the Boston Red Sox. Johnny Pesky made the final out with Williams on deck.

=== Season standings ===
American League
Team	W	L	Pct.	GB	Home	Road
New York Yankees	97	57	.630	—	54‍–‍23	43‍–‍34
Boston Red Sox	96	58	.623	1	61‍–‍16	35‍–‍42
Cleveland Indians	89	65	.578	8	49‍–‍28	40‍–‍37
Detroit Tigers	87	67	.565	10	50‍–‍27	37‍–‍40
Philadelphia Athletics	81	73	.526	16	52‍–‍25	29‍–‍48
Chicago White Sox	63	91	.409	34	32‍–‍45	31‍–‍46
St. Louis Browns	53	101	.344	44	36‍–‍41	17‍–‍60
Washington Senators	50	104	.325	47	26‍–‍51	24‍–‍53

=== Record vs. opponents ===
1949 American League record Sources:
Team	BOS	CWS	CLE	DET	NYY	PHA	SLB	WSH
Boston	—	17–5	8–14	15–7–1	9–13	14–8	15–7	18–4
Chicago	5–17	—	7–15	8–14	7–15	6–16	15–7	15–7
Cleveland	14–8	15–7	—	13–9	10–12	9–13	15–7	13–9
Detroit	7–15–1	14–8	9–13	—	11–11	14–8	14–8	18–4
New York	13–9	15–7	12–10	11–11	—	14–8	17–5–1	15–7
Philadelphia	8–14	16–6	13–9	8–14	8–14	—	12–10	16–6
St. Louis	7–15	7–15	7–15	8–14	5–17–1	10–12	—	9–13
Washington	4–18	7–15	9–13	4–18	7–15	6–16	13–9	—

=== Notable transactions ===
- May 24, 1949: Milo Candini was traded by the Senators to the Oakland Oaks for Lloyd Hittle.

=== Roster ===
1949 Washington Senators
Roster
Pitchers: 20 Paul Calvert; 19 Milo Candini; 28 Buzz Dozier; 19,28 Al Gettel; 16 Julio González; 16 Mickey Haefner; 14 Mickey Harris; 26 Joe Haynes; 37 Lloyd Hittle; 15 Sid Hudson; 14 Ed Klieman; 35 Walt Masterson; 19 Jim Pearce; 10 Ray Scarborough; 11 Dizzy Sutherland; 12 Forrest Thompson; 18 Dick Weik; 21 Dick Welteroth	Catchers: 9,11 Jake Early; 8 Al Evans; 11 Ralph Weigel; Infielders: 24 Mark Christman; 4 Sam Dente; 27 Jay Difani; 1 Al Kozar; 5 Sherry Robertson; 25 Eddie Robinson; 7 Eddie Yost	Outfielders: 3 Gil Coan; 2 Buddy Lewis; 27 Sam Mele; 35 Roberto Ortiz; 23 John Simmons; 6 Bud Stewart; 22 Clyde Vollmer; Other batters: 17 Hal Keller; 28 Herman Reich	Manager: 40 Joe Kuhel; Coaches: 33 Nick Altrock; 32 Rick Ferrell; 36 Joe Fitzgerald; 31 Clyde Milan; 34 Sam West

== Player stats ==
= Indicates team leader

=== Batting ===
==== Starters by position ====
Note: Pos = Position; G = Games played; AB = At bats; H = Hits; Avg. = Batting average; HR = Home runs; RBI = Runs batted in

Pos	Player	G	AB	H	Avg.	HR	RBI
C	Al Evans	109	321	87	.271	2	42
1B	Eddie Robinson	143	527	155	.294	18	78
2B	Al Kozar	105	350	94	.269	4	31
SS	Sam Dente	153	590	161	.273	1	53
3B	Eddie Yost	124	435	110	.253	9	45
OF	Gil Coan	111	358	78	.218	3	25
OF	Bud Stewart	118	388	110	.284	8	43
OF	Clyde Vollmer	129	443	112	.253	14	59

==== Other batters ====
Note: G = Games played; AB = At bats; H = Hits; Avg. = Batting average; HR = Home runs; RBI = Runs batted in

Player	G	AB	H	Avg.	HR	RBI
Sherry Robertson	110	374	94	.251	11	42
Sam Mele	78	264	64	.242	3	25
Buddy Lewis	95	257	63	.245	3	28
Jake Early	53	138	34	.246	1	11
Roberto Ortiz	40	129	36	.279	1	11
Mark Christman	49	112	24	.214	3	18
John Simmons	62	93	20	.215	0	5
Ralph Weigel	34	60	14	.233	0	4
Hal Keller	3	3	1	.333	0	0
Herman Reich	2	2	0	.000	0	0
Jay Difani	2	1	1	1.000	0	0

=== Pitching ===
= Indicates league leader

==== Starting pitchers ====
Note: G = Games pitched; IP = Innings pitched; W = Wins; L = Losses; ERA = Earned run average; SO = Strikeouts

Player	G	IP	W	L	ERA	SO
Sid Hudson	40	209.0	8	17*	4.22	54
Ray Scarborough	34	199.2	13	11	4.60	81
Paul Calvert	34	160.2	6	17*	5.43	52
Mickey Harris	23	129.0	2	12	5.16	54
Walt Masterson	10	53.0	3	2	3.23	17
Dizzy Sutherland	1	1.0	0	1	45.00	0

- Tied with Ned Garver (St. Louis)

==== Other pitchers ====
Note: G = Games pitched; IP = Innings pitched; W = Wins; L = Losses; ERA = Earned run average; SO = Strikeouts

Player	G	IP	W	L	ERA	SO
Lloyd Hittle	36	109.0	5	7	4.21	32
Joe Haynes	37	96.1	2	9	6.26	19
Dick Weik	27	95.1	3	12	5.38	58
Mickey Haefner	19	91.2	5	5	4.42	23
Forrest Thompson	9	16.1	1	3	4.41	8
Jim Pearce	2	5.1	0	1	8.44	1

==== Relief pitchers ====
Note: G = Games pitched; W = Wins; L = Losses; SV = Saves; ERA = Earned run average; SO = Strikeouts

Player	G	W	L	SV	ERA	SO
Dick Welteroth	52	2	5	2	7.36	37
Al Gettel	16	0	2	1	5.45	7
Julio González	13	0	0	0	4.72	5
Milo Candini	3	0	0	1	4.76	1
Buzz Dozier	2	0	0	0	11.37	1
Ed Klieman	2	0	0	0	18.00	1

== Farm system ==
Level	Team	League	Manager
AA	Chattanooga Lookouts	Southern Association	George Myatt and Fred Walters
B	Havana Cubanos	Florida International League	Oscar Rodríguez
B	Hagerstown Owls	Interstate League	Woody Wheaton
B	Charlotte Hornets	Tri-State League	Clyde McDowell
C	New Castle Nats	Middle Atlantic League	Bill Mongiello
D	Orlando Senators	Florida State League	Red Dulaney, Walter Zurowski and George Myatt
D	Fulton Railroaders	KITTY League	Ivan Kuester
D	Concord Nationals	North Carolina State League	James Calleran
D	Emporia Nationals	Virginia League	Morrie Aderholt
