= 1948 Washington Senators season =

1948 Washington Senators
- League: American League
- Ballpark: Griffith Stadium
- City: Washington, D.C.
- Record: 56–97 (.366)
- League place: 7th
- Owners: Clark Griffith and George H. Richardson
- Managers: Joe Kuhel
- Television: WTTG (Bob Wolff)
- Radio: WWDC (FM)/WPIX (Arch McDonald, Ray Morgan)

The 1948 Washington Senators won 56 games, lost 97, and finished in seventh place in the American League. They were managed by Joe Kuhel and played home games at Griffith Stadium. It was the first Senators season to be broadcast on television with Bob Wolff on the booth for gameday broadcasts on WTTG-TV.

== Regular season ==
=== Season standings ===
American League
Team	W	L	Pct.	GB	Home	Road
Cleveland Indians	97	58	.626	—	48‍–‍30	49‍–‍28
Boston Red Sox	96	59	.619	1	55‍–‍23	41‍–‍36
New York Yankees	94	60	.610	2½	50‍–‍27	44‍–‍33
Philadelphia Athletics	84	70	.545	12½	36‍–‍41	48‍–‍29
Detroit Tigers	78	76	.506	18½	39‍–‍38	39‍–‍38
St. Louis Browns	59	94	.386	37	34‍–‍42	25‍–‍52
Washington Senators	56	97	.366	40	29‍–‍48	27‍–‍49
Chicago White Sox	51	101	.336	44½	27‍–‍48	24‍–‍53

=== Record vs. opponents ===
1948 American League record Sources:
Team	BOS	CWS	CLE	DET	NYY	PHA	SLB	WSH
Boston	—	14–8	11–12	15–7	14–8	12–10	15–7	15–7
Chicago	8–14	—	6–16	8–14	6–16	6–16	8–13–1	9–12–1
Cleveland	12–11	16–6	—	13–9	10–12	16–6	14–8–1	16–6
Detroit	7–15	14–8	9–13	—	9–13	12–10	11–11	16–6
New York	8–14	16–6	12–10	13–9	—	12–10	16–6	17–5
Philadelphia	10–12	16–6	6–16	10–12	10–12	—	18–4	14–8
St. Louis	7–15	13–8–1	8–14–1	11–11	6–16	4–18	—	10–12
Washington	7–15	12–9–1	6–16	6–16	5–17	8–14	12–10	—

=== Roster ===
1948 Washington Senators
Roster
Pitchers: 19 Milo Candini; 16 Cal Cooper; 17 Tom Ferrick; 14,22 Ramón García; 16 Mickey Haefner; 28,49 Earl Harrist; 20 Sid Hudson; 35 Walt Masterson; 15 Marino Pieretti; 10 Ray Scarborough; 12 Forrest Thompson; 18 Dick Weik; 21 Dick Welteroth; 26 Early Wynn	Catchers: 11 Jake Early; 8 Al Evans; 9 Len Okrie; Infielders: 24 Mark Christman; 22 Jim Clark; 18,22 Ángel Fleitas; 2 Al Kozar; 15,22 Sammy Meeks; 1 John Sullivan; 4 Mickey Vernon; 7 Eddie Yost	Outfielders: 3 Gil Coan; 6 Leon Culberson; 14 Larry Drake; 29 Carden Gillenwater; 25 Tom McBride; 5 Sherry Robertson; 28,6 Bud Stewart; -- Clyde Vollmer; 23 Junior Wooten; Other batters: 28 Jay Difani	Manager: 40 Joe Kuhel; Coaches: 33 Nick Altrock; 32 Rick Ferrell; 36 Joe Fitzgerald; 31 Clyde Milan; 34 Sam West

== Player stats ==
=== Batting ===
==== Starters by position ====
Note: Pos = Position; G = Games played; AB = At bats; H = Hits; Avg. = Batting average; HR = Home runs; RBI = Runs batted in

Pos	Player	G	AB	H	Avg.	HR	RBI
C	Jake Early	97	246	54	.220	1	28
1B	Mickey Vernon	150	558	135	.242	3	48
2B	Al Kozar	150	577	144	.250	1	58
SS	Mark Christman	120	409	106	.259	1	40
3B	Eddie Yost	145	555	138	.249	2	50
OF	Gil Coan	138	513	119	.232	7	60
OF	Bud Stewart	118	401	112	.279	7	69
OF	Junior Wooten	88	258	66	.256	1	23

==== Other batters ====
Note: G = Games played; AB = At bats; H = Hits; Avg. = Batting average; HR = Home runs; RBI = Runs batted in

Player	G	AB	H	Avg.	HR	RBI
Al Evans	93	228	59	.259	2	28
Carden Gillenwater	77	221	54	.244	3	21
Tom McBride	92	206	53	.257	1	29
Sherry Robertson	71	187	46	.246	2	22
John Sullivan	85	173	36	.208	0	12
Len Okrie	19	42	10	.238	0	1
Sammy Meeks	24	33	4	.121	0	2
Leon Culberson	12	29	5	.172	0	2
Ángel Fleitas	15	13	1	.077	0	1
Jim Clark	9	12	3	.250	0	0
Larry Drake	4	7	2	.286	0	1
Clyde Vollmer	1	5	2	.400	0	0
Jay Difani	2	2	0	.000	0	0

=== Pitching ===
==== Starting pitchers ====
Note: G = Games pitched; IP = Innings pitched; W = Wins; L = Losses; ERA = Earned run average; SO = Strikeouts

Player	G	IP	W	L	ERA	SO
Early Wynn	33	198.0	8	19	5.82	49
Walt Masterson	33	188.0	8	15	3.83	72
Ray Scarborough	31	185.1	15	8	2.82	76
Sid Hudson	39	182.0	4	16	5.88	53
Mickey Haefner	28	147.2	5	13	4.02	45
Dick Weik	3	12.2	1	2	5.68	8

==== Other pitchers ====
Note: G = Games pitched; IP = Innings pitched; W = Wins; L = Losses; ERA = Earned run average; SO = Strikeouts

Player	G	IP	W	L	ERA	SO
Forrest Thompson	46	131.1	6	10	3.84	40
Milo Candini	35	94.1	2	3	5.15	23
Earl Harrist	23	60.2	3	3	4.60	21
Marino Pieretti	8	11.2	0	2	10.80	6

==== Relief pitchers ====
Note: G = Games pitched; W = Wins; L = Losses; SV = Saves; ERA = Earned run average; SO = Strikeouts

Player	G	W	L	SV	ERA	SO
Tom Ferrick	37	2	5	10	4.15	34
Dick Welteroth	33	2	1	1	5.51	16
Ramón García	4	0	0	0	17.18	2
Junior Wooten	1	0	0	0	9.00	1
Cal Cooper	1	0	0	0	45.00	0

== Farm system ==
Level	Team	League	Manager
AA	Chattanooga Lookouts	Southern Association	George Myatt
B	Sherman–Denison Twins	Big State League	José Rodríguez
B	Bridgeport Bees	Colonial League	Glenn Snyder and Buddy Hall
B	Gadsden Pilots	Southeastern League	Bill McGhee, Jimmy Zinn and Harry Davis
B	Charlotte Hornets	Tri-State League	Joe Bowman
C	Havana Cubanos	Florida International League	Oscar Rodríguez
C	Henderson Oilers	Lone Star League	Guy Sturdy, John Stone, Roland Miller and Mel Hicks
C	New Castle Chiefs	Middle Atlantic League	Bob Crowe, Frankie Pytlak and Carl Miller
D	Orlando Senators	Florida State League	Lou Bevil
D	Fulton Chicks	KITTY League	Fred Biggs, Bud Burns and Ivan Kuester
D	Big Spring Broncs	Longhorn League	Pat Stasey
D	Emporia Nationals	Virginia League	Morrie Aderholt

LEAGUE CHAMPIONS: Sherman–Denison, Havana
