= 1950 Washington Senators season =

1950 Washington Senators
- League: American League
- Ballpark: Griffith Stadium
- City: Washington, D.C.
- Record: 67–87 (.435)
- League place: 5th
- Owners: Clark Griffith, John Jachym, H. Gabriel Murphy
- Managers: Bucky Harris
- Television: WTTG (Arch McDonald, Bob Wolff)
- Radio: WWDC (FM) (Arch McDonald, Bob Wolff)

The 1950 Washington Senators won 67 games, lost 87, and finished in fifth place in the American League. They were managed by Bucky Harris and played home games at Griffith Stadium.

== Offseason ==
- November 17, 1949: Steve Nagy was drafted by the Senators from the San Francisco Seals in the 1949 rule 5 draft.
- Prior to 1950 season: Al Sima was purchased by the Senators from the New York Giants.

== Regular season ==
=== Season standings ===
American League
Team	W	L	Pct.	GB	Home	Road
New York Yankees	98	56	.636	—	53‍–‍24	45‍–‍32
Detroit Tigers	95	59	.617	3	50‍–‍30	45‍–‍29
Boston Red Sox	94	60	.610	4	55‍–‍22	39‍–‍38
Cleveland Indians	92	62	.597	6	49‍–‍28	43‍–‍34
Washington Senators	67	87	.435	31	35‍–‍42	32‍–‍45
Chicago White Sox	60	94	.390	38	35‍–‍42	25‍–‍52
St. Louis Browns	58	96	.377	40	27‍–‍47	31‍–‍49
Philadelphia Athletics	52	102	.338	46	29‍–‍48	23‍–‍54

=== Record vs. opponents ===
1950 American League record Sources:
Team	BOS	CWS	CLE	DET	NYY	PHA	SLB	WSH
Boston	—	15–7	10–12	10–12	9–13	19–3	19–3	12–10
Chicago	7–15	—	8–14	6–16–2	8–14	11–11	12–10	8–14
Cleveland	12–10	14–8	—	13–9–1	8–14	17–5	13–9	15–7
Detroit	12–10	16–6–2	9–13–1	—	11–11	17–5	17–5	13–9
New York	13–9	14–8	14–8	11–11	—	15–7	17–5	14–8–1
Philadelphia	3–19	11–11	5–17	5–17	7–15	—	8–14	13–9
St. Louis	3–19	10–12	9–13	5–17	5–17	14–8	—	12–10
Washington	10–12	14–8	7–15	9–13	8–14–1	9–13	10–12	—

=== Notable transactions ===
- June 14, 1950: Dick Weik was traded by the Senators to the Cleveland Indians for Mickey Vernon.
- June 25, 1950: Steve Nagy was traded by the Senators to the San Francisco Seals for Elmer Singleton.

=== Roster ===
1950 Washington Senators
Roster
Pitchers: 29 Gene Bearden; 15 Sandy Consuegra; 17 Mickey Harris; 18 Joe Haynes; 19 Lloyd Hittle; 20 Sid Hudson; 25 Bob Kuzava; 21 Connie Marrero; 19 Rogelio Martínez; 19,33 Julio Moreno; 22 Steve Nagy; 14 Carlos Pascual; 24 Jim Pearce; 19 Bob Ross; 25 Ray Scarborough; 28 Al Sima; 22 Elmer Singleton; 27 Dick Weik; 21 Dick Welteroth	Catchers: 10 Al Evans; 11 Mickey Grasso; 14 Hal Keller; 12 Len Okrie; Infielders: 46 Merl Combs; 40 Sam Dente; 42 Al Kozar; 42 Cass Michaels; 44 Eddie Robinson; 46 Fred Taylor; 44 Mickey Vernon; 45 Eddie Yost	Outfielders: 30 Gil Coan; 31 Sam Mele; 32 Irv Noren; 35 Tommy O'Brien; 33 Roberto Ortiz; 35 Johnny Ostrowski; 43 Sherry Robertson; 34 Bud Stewart; 35 Clyde Vollmer; Other batters: 41 George Genovese	Manager: 50 Bucky Harris; Coaches: 54 Nick Altrock; 52 Joe Fitzgerald; 51 Clyde Milan; 53 George Myatt

== Player stats ==
= Indicates team leader

=== Batting ===
==== Starters by position ====
Note: Pos = Position; G = Games played; AB = At bats; H = Hits; Avg. = Batting average; HR = Home runs; RBI = Runs batted in

Pos	Player	G	AB	H	Avg.	HR	RBI
C	Al Evans	90	289	68	.235	2	30
1B	Mickey Vernon	90	327	100	.306	9	65
2B	Cass Michaels	106	388	97	.250	4	47
SS	Sam Dente	155	603	144	.239	2	59
3B	Eddie Yost	155	573	169	.295	11	58
OF	Sam Mele	126	435	119	.274	12	86
OF	Irv Noren	138	542	160	.295	14	98
OF	Bud Stewart	118	378	101	.267	4	35

==== Other batters ====
Note: G = Games played; AB = At bats; H = Hits; Avg. = Batting average; HR = Home runs; RBI = Runs batted in

Player	G	AB	H	Avg.	HR	RBI
Gil Coan	104	366	111	.303	7	50
Mickey Grasso	75	195	56	.287	1	22
Johnny Ostrowski	55	141	32	.227	4	23
Eddie Robinson	36	129	30	.233	1	13
Sherry Robertson	71	123	32	.260	2	16
Merl Combs	37	102	25	.245	0	6
Roberto Ortiz	39	75	17	.227	0	8
Al Kozar	20	55	11	.200	0	3
Hal Keller	11	28	6	.214	1	5
Len Okrie	17	27	6	.222	0	2
Fred Taylor	6	16	2	.125	0	0
Clyde Vollmer	6	14	4	.286	0	1
Tommy O'Brien	3	9	1	.111	0	1
George Genovese	3	1	0	.000	0	0

=== Pitching ===
==== Starting pitchers ====
Note: G = Games pitched; IP = Innings pitched; W = Wins; L = Losses; ERA = Earned run average; SO = Strikeouts

Player	G	IP	W	L	ERA	SO
Sid Hudson	30	237.2	14	14	4.09	75
Bob Kuzava	22	155.0	8	7	3.95	84
Connie Marrero	27	152.0	6	10	4.50	63
Sandy Consuegra	21	124.2	7	8	4.40	38
Gene Bearden	12	68.1	3	5	4.21	40
Ray Scarborough	8	58.1	3	5	4.01	24
Steve Nagy	9	53.1	2	5	6.58	17
Julio Moreno	4	21.1	1	1	4.64	7
Carlos Pascual	2	17.0	1	1	2.12	3

==== Other pitchers ====
Note: G = Games pitched; IP = Innings pitched; W = Wins; L = Losses; ERA = Earned run average; SO = Strikeouts

Player	G	IP	W	L	ERA	SO
Joe Haynes	27	101.2	7	5	5.84	15
Al Sima	17	77.0	4	5	4.79	23
Jim Pearce	20	56.2	2	1	6.04	18
Dick Weik	14	44.0	1	3	4.30	26
Lloyd Hittle	11	43.1	2	4	4.98	9
Bob Ross	6	12.2	0	1	8.53	2
Rogelio Martínez	2	1.1	0	1	27.00	0

==== Relief pitchers ====
Note: G = Games pitched; W = Wins; L = Losses; SV = Saves; ERA = Earned run average; SO = Strikeouts

Player	G	W	L	SV	ERA	SO
Mickey Harris	53	5	9	15	4.78	41
Elmer Singleton	21	1	2	0	5.20	19
Dick Welteroth	5	0	0	0	3.00	2

== Awards and honors ==
All-Star Game

- Cass Michaels, Second Base, Reserve

== Farm system ==
Level	Team	League	Manager
AA	Chattanooga Lookouts	Southern Association	Fred Walters
A	Augusta Tigers	Sally League	Pete Appleton
B	Havana Cubanos	Florida International League	Oscar Rodríguez
B	Charlotte Hornets	Tri-State League	Clyde McDowell and Joe Bird
C	New Castle Nats	Middle Atlantic League	Charles Cronin
D	Orlando Senators	Florida State League	Cal Ermer
D	Rome Red Sox	Georgia–Alabama League	Norman Veazey, John Stowe and Myril Hoag
D	Fulton Railroaders	KITTY League	Ivan Kuester
D	Concord Nationals	North Carolina State League	George Lacy, Tom Hockenbury and Ginger Watts
D	Wellsville Senators	PONY League	Jimmy Wasdell and Bill Mongiello
D	Emporia Nationals	Virginia League	Morrie Aderholt

LEAGUE CHAMPIONS: Emporia
