= 1947 Washington Senators season =

1947 Washington Senators
- League: American League
- Ballpark: Griffith Stadium
- City: Washington, D.C.
- Record: 64–90 (.416)
- League place: 7th
- Owners: Clark Griffith and George H. Richardson
- Managers: Ossie Bluege
- Radio: WWDC (FM)/WPIX (Arch McDonald, Ray Morgan)

The 1947 Washington Senators won 64 games, lost 90, and finished in seventh place in the American League. They were managed by Ossie Bluege and played home games at Griffith Stadium.

== Regular season ==
=== Season standings ===
American League
Team	W	L	Pct.	GB	Home	Road
New York Yankees	97	57	.630	—	55‍–‍22	42‍–‍35
Detroit Tigers	85	69	.552	12	46‍–‍31	39‍–‍38
Boston Red Sox	83	71	.539	14	49‍–‍30	34‍–‍41
Cleveland Indians	80	74	.519	17	38‍–‍39	42‍–‍35
Philadelphia Athletics	78	76	.506	19	39‍–‍38	39‍–‍38
Chicago White Sox	70	84	.455	27	32‍–‍43	38‍–‍41
Washington Senators	64	90	.416	33	36‍–‍41	28‍–‍49
St. Louis Browns	59	95	.383	38	29‍–‍48	30‍–‍47

=== Record vs. opponents ===
1947 American League record Sources:
Team	BOS	CWS	CLE	DET	NYY	PHA	SLB	WSH
Boston	—	16–6–1	9–13	12–10–1	9–13	10–12–1	15–7	12–10
Chicago	6–16–1	—	11–11	7–15	10–12	11–11	11–11	14–8
Cleveland	13–9	11–11	—	8–14–2	7–15	11–11–1	17–5	13–9
Detroit	10–12–1	15–7	14–8–2	—	8–14–1	11–11	15–7	12–10
New York	13–9	12–10	15–7	14–8–1	—	13–9	15–7	15–7
Philadelphia	12–10–1	11–11	11–11–1	11–11	9–13	—	13–9	11–11
St. Louis	7–15	11–11	5–17	7–15	7–15	9–13	—	13–9
Washington	10–12	8–14	9–13	10–12	7–15	11–11	9–13	—

=== Notable transactions ===
- September 23, 1947: Joe Grace was selected off waivers from the Senators by the Pittsburgh Pirates.

=== Roster ===
1947 Washington Senators
Roster
Pitchers: 13,20 Milo Candini; 23 Scott Cary; 22 Buzz Dozier; 17 Tom Ferrick; 16 Mickey Haefner; 12 Lum Harris; 13,20 Sid Hudson; 51 Bill Kennedy; 14 Lou Knerr; 35 Walt Masterson; 00 Bobo Newsom; 15 Marino Pieretti; 21 Ray Scarborough; 19 Hal Toenes; 26 Early Wynn	Catchers: 8 Al Evans; 37 Rick Ferrell; 9 Frank Mancuso; Infielders: 3,12,22 Mark Christman; -- Cal Ermer; 25 Ed Lyons; 24 George Myatt; 6 Jerry Priddy; 11 John Sullivan; 7 Cecil Travis; 4 Mickey Vernon; 28 Eddie Yost	Outfielders: 1 George Case; 22 Gil Coan; 19 Joe Grace; 2 Buddy Lewis; 51 Felix Mackiewicz; 32 Tom McBride; 3,22 Sherry Robertson; 5 Stan Spence; 23,32 Junior Wooten	Manager: 30 Ossie Bluege; Coaches: 33 Nick Altrock; 37 Rick Ferrell; 29 Joe Fitzgerald; 31 Clyde Milan; 34 Sam West

== Player stats ==
=== Batting ===
==== Starters by position ====
Note: Pos = Position; G = Games played; AB = At bats; H = Hits; Avg. = Batting average; HR = Home runs; RBI = Runs batted in

Pos	Player	G	AB	H	Avg.	HR	RBI
C	Al Evans	99	319	77	.241	2	23
1B	Mickey Vernon	154	600	159	.265	7	85
2B	Jerry Priddy	147	505	108	.214	3	49
3B	Eddie Yost	115	428	102	.238	0	14
SS	Mark Christman	110	374	83	.222	1	33
OF	Joe Grace	78	234	58	.248	3	17
OF	Stan Spence	147	506	141	.279	16	73
OF	Buddy Lewis	140	506	132	.261	6	48

==== Other batters ====
Note: G = Games played; AB = At bats; H = Hits; Avg. = Batting average; HR = Home runs; RBI = Runs batted in

Player	G	AB	H	Avg.	HR	RBI
Sherry Robertson	95	266	62	.233	1	23
Cecil Travis	74	204	44	.216	1	10
Tom McBride	56	166	45	.271	0	15
John Sullivan	49	133	34	.256	0	5
Frank Mancuso	43	131	30	.229	0	13
Rick Ferrell	37	99	30	.303	0	12
George Case	36	80	12	.150	0	2
Gil Coan	11	42	21	.500	0	3
Ed Lyons	7	28	4	.143	0	0
Junior Wooten	6	24	2	.083	0	1
George Myatt	12	7	0	.000	0	0
Felix Mackiewicz	3	6	1	.167	0	0
Cal Ermer	1	3	0	.000	0	0

=== Pitching ===
==== Starting pitchers ====
Note: G = Games pitched; IP = Innings pitched; W = Wins; L = Losses; ERA = Earned run average; SO = Strikeouts

Player	G	IP	W	L	ERA	SO
Walt Masterson	35	253.0	12	16	3.13	135
Early Wynn	33	247.0	17	15	3.64	73
Mickey Haefner	31	193.0	10	14	3.64	77
Sid Hudson	20	106.0	6	9	5.60	37
Bobo Newsom	14	83.2	4	6	4.09	40

==== Other pitchers ====
Note: G = Games pitched; IP = Innings pitched; W = Wins; L = Losses; ERA = Earned run average; SO = Strikeouts

Player	G	IP	W	L	ERA	SO
Ray Scarborough	33	161.0	6	13	3.41	63
Marino Pieretti	23	83.1	2	4	4.21	32
Hal Toenes	3	6.2	0	1	6.75	5

==== Relief pitchers ====
Note: G = Games pitched; W = Wins; L = Losses; SV = Saves; ERA = Earned run average; SO = Strikeouts

Player	G	W	L	SV	ERA	SO
Tom Ferrick	31	1	7	9	3.15	23
Milo Candini	38	3	4	1	5.17	31
Scott Cary	23	3	1	0	5.93	25
Lou Knerr	6	0	0	0	11.00	5
Lum Harris	3	0	0	0	2.84	2
Bill Kennedy	2	0	0	0	8.10	1
Buzz Dozier	2	0	0	0	0.00	2

== Farm system ==
Level	Team	League	Manager
AA	Chattanooga Lookouts	Southern Association	Bert Niehoff
B	Charlotte Hornets	Tri-State League	Spencer Abbott and Cal Ermer
C	Havana Cubanos	Florida International League	Oscar Rodríguez
D	Brewton Millers	Alabama State League	Norman Veazey
D	Kingsport Cherokees	Appalachian League	Dick Bass
D	Orlando Senators	Florida State League	Lou Bevil

LEAGUE CHAMPIONS: Charlotte, Havana
