= List of Minnesota Twins seasons =

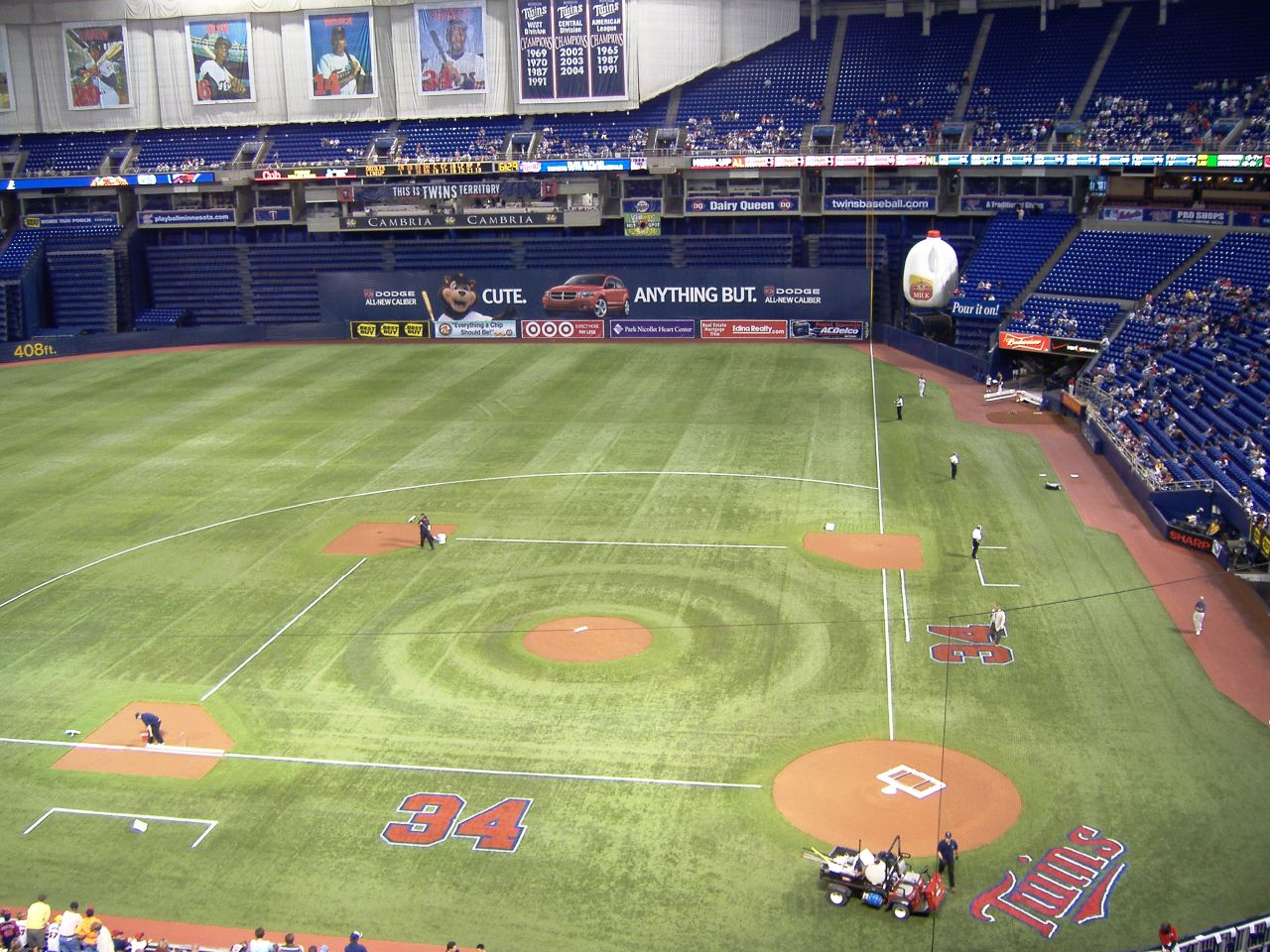
The Metrodome, home of the Twins from 1982 through 2009.

This is a list of seasons completed by the Minnesota Twins, originally known as the Washington Senators, a professional baseball franchise based in Minneapolis, Minnesota; they currently play in the American League (AL) Central division.

The Minnesota Twins franchise has won three World Series in 1924, 1987 and 1991, the first of which occurred when the team was in Washington D.C. As the Senators, the team were annual doormats for the AL except 1924-1933 when the team played in three World Series (winning one). The team enjoyed success in their early years in Minnesota, reaching the World Series in 1965 and playing in two American League Championship Series with stars (and future Hall of Famers) like Harmon Killebrew, Rod Carew, Tony Oliva, and Jim Kaat on the roster. From 1971 to 1986, the Twins failed to reach the postseason as their stars either retired, were traded, or fled via Free Agency. The Twins had eight straight losing seasons from 1993 to 2000 and the team was a frequent target for rumored MLB contraction, but this was followed by one of the franchise's most consistent periods of success when the team only had one losing season (2007) between 2001 and 2010. Despite the team's success during this period, the Twins failed to reach another World Series. The team has been up and down since 2010, epitomized with the franchise losing 103 games in 2016 and winning 101 games (and reaching the playoffs) in 2019.

== Regular season record-by-year ==
World Series Champions (1903–present) †	AL Champions (1901–present) *	Division champions (1969–present) ^	Wild card berth (1994–present) ¤

Season	League	Division	Finish	Wins	Losses	Win%	GB	Postseason	Awards
Washington Senators
1901	AL		6th	61	72	.459	20½		
1902	AL		6th	61	75	.449	22		
1903	AL		8th	43	94	.314	47½		
1904	AL		8th	38	113	.252	55½		
1905	AL		7th	64	87	.424	29½		
1906	AL		7th	55	95	.367	37½		
1907	AL		8th	49	102	.325	43½		
1908	AL		7th	67	85	.441	22½		
1909	AL		8th	42	110	.276	56		
1910	AL		7th	66	85	.437	36½		
1911	AL		7th	64	90	.416	38½		
1912	AL		2nd	91	61	.599	14		
1913	AL		2nd	90	64	.584	6½		Walter Johnson (MVP)
1914	AL		3rd	81	73	.526	19		
1915	AL		4th	85	68	.556	17		
1916	AL		7th	76	77	.497	14½		
1917	AL		5th	74	79	.484	25½		
1918	AL		3rd	72	56	.563	4		
1919	AL		7th	56	84	.400	32		
1920	AL		6th	68	84	.447	29		
1921	AL		4th	80	73	.523	18		
1922	AL		6th	69	85	.448	25		
1923	AL		4th	75	78	.490	23½		
1924	AL† *		1st	92	62	.597	-	Won World Series (Giants) 4–3 †	Walter Johnson (MVP)
1925	AL *		1st	96	55	.636	-	Lost World Series (Pirates) 4–3 *	Roger Peckinpaugh (MVP)
1926	AL		4th	81	69	.540	8		
1927	AL		3rd	85	69	.552	25		
1928	AL		4th	75	79	.487	26		
1929	AL		5th	71	81	.467	34		
1930	AL		2nd	94	60	.610	8		
1931	AL		3rd	92	62	.597	16		
1932	AL		3rd	93	61	.604	14		
1933	AL *		1st	99	53	.651	-	Lost World Series (Giants) 4–1 *	
1934	AL		7th	66	86	.434	34		
1935	AL		6th	67	86	.438	27		
1936	AL		4th	82	71	.536	20		
1937	AL		6th	73	80	.477	28½		
1938	AL		5th	75	76	.493	23½		
1939	AL		6th	65	87	.428	41½		
1940	AL		7th	64	90	.416	26		
1941	AL		6th	70	84	.455	31		
1942	AL		7th	62	89	.411	39½		
1943	AL		2nd	84	69	.549	13½		
1944	AL		8th	64	90	.416	25		
1945	AL		2nd	87	67	.565	1½		
1946	AL		4th	76	78	.494	28		
1947	AL		7th	64	90	.416	33		
1948	AL		7th	56	97	.366	40		
1949	AL		8th	50	104	.325	47		
1950	AL		5th	67	87	.435	31		
1951	AL		7th	62	92	.403	36		
1952	AL		5th	78	76	.506	17		
1953	AL		5th	76	76	.500	23½		
1954	AL		6th	66	88	.429	45		
1955	AL		8th	53	101	.344	43		
1956	AL		7th	59	95	.367	38		
1957	AL		8th	55	99	.357	43		
1958	AL		8th	61	93	.396	31		Albie Pearson (ROY)
1959	AL		8th	63	91	.409	31		Bob Allison (ROY)
1960	AL		5th	73	81	.474	24		
Minnesota Twins
1961	AL		7th	70	90	.438	38		
1962	AL		2nd	91	71	.562	5		
1963	AL		3rd	91	70	.565	13		
1964	AL		6th	79	83	.488	20		Tony Oliva (ROY)
1965	AL *		1st	102	60	.630	—	Lost World Series (Dodgers) 4–3 *	Zoilo Versalles (MVP)
1966	AL		2nd	89	73	.549	9		
1967	AL		2nd	91	71	.562	1		Rod Carew (ROY)
1968	AL		7th	79	83	.488	24		
1969	AL	West ^	1st	97	65	.599	—	Lost ALCS (Orioles) 3–0	Harmon Killebrew (MVP)
1970	AL	West ^	1st	98	64	.605	—	Lost ALCS (Orioles) 3–0	Jim Perry (CYA)
1971	AL	West	5th	74	86	.463	26½		
1972	AL	West	3rd	77	77	.500	15½		
1973	AL	West	3rd	81	81	.500	13		
1974	AL	West	3rd	82	80	.506	8		
1975	AL	West	4th	76	83	.478	20½		
1976	AL	West	3rd	85	77	.525	5		
1977	AL	West	4th	84	77	.522	17½		Rod Carew (MVP)
1978	AL	West	4th	73	89	.451	19		
1979	AL	West	4th	82	80	.506	6		John Castino (ROY)
1980	AL	West	3rd	77	84	.478	19½		
1981	AL	West	7th	17	39	.304	18		
1981	AL	West	4th	24	29	.453	6		
1982	AL	West	7th	60	102	.370	33		
1983	AL	West	6th	70	92	.432	29		
1984	AL	West	3rd	81	81	.500	3		
1985	AL	West	4th	77	85	.475	14		
1986	AL	West	6th	71	91	.438	21		
1987	AL †*	West ^	1st	85	77	.525	—	Won ALCS (Tigers) 4–1; Won World Series (Cardinals) 4–3 †	Frank Viola (WS MVP)
1988	AL	West	2nd	91	71	.562	13		Frank Viola (CYA)
1989	AL	West	5th	80	82	.494	19		
1990	AL	West	7th	74	88	.457	29		
1991	AL †	West ^	1st	95	67	.586	—	Won ALCS (Blue Jays) 4–1; Won World Series (Braves) 4–3 †	Chuck Knoblauch (ROY); Tom Kelly (MOY); Jack Morris (WS MVP)
1992	AL	West	2nd	90	72	.556	6		
1993	AL	West	6th	71	91	.438	23		
1994	AL	Central	4th	53	60	.469	14	Postseason canceled	
1995	AL	Central	5th	56	88	.389	44		Marty Cordova (ROY)
1996	AL	Central	4th	78	84	.481	21½		
1997	AL	Central	4th	68	94	.420	18½		
1998	AL	Central	4th	70	92	.432	19		
1999	AL	Central	5th	63	97	.394	33		
2000	AL	Central	5th	69	93	.426	26		
2001	AL	Central	2nd	85	77	.525	6		
2002	AL	Central ^	1st	94	67	.584	—	Won ALDS (Athletics) 3–2; Lost ALCS (Angels) 4–1	
2003	AL	Central ^	1st	90	72	.556	—	Lost ALDS (Yankees) 3–1	
2004	AL	Central ^	1st	92	70	.568	—	Lost ALDS (Yankees) 3–1	Johan Santana (CYA)
2005	AL	Central	3rd	83	79	.512	16		
2006	AL	Central ^	1st	96	66	.593	—	Lost ALDS (Athletics) 3–0	Justin Morneau (MVP); Johan Santana (CYA, TC)
2007	AL	Central	3rd	79	83	.488	17		
2008	AL	Central	2nd	88	75	.540	1		
2009	AL	Central ^	1st	87	76	.534	—	Lost ALDS (Yankees) 3–0	Joe Mauer (MVP)
2010	AL	Central ^	1st	94	68	.580	—	Lost ALDS (Yankees) 3–0	Ron Gardenhire (MOY)
2011	AL	Central	5th	63	99	.389	32		
2012	AL	Central	5th	66	96	.407	22		
2013	AL	Central	4th	66	96	.407	27		
2014	AL	Central	5th	70	92	.432	20		
2015	AL	Central	2nd	83	79	.512	12		
2016	AL	Central	5th	59	103	.364	35½		
2017	AL	Central	2nd ¤	85	77	.525	17	Lost ALWC (Yankees)	Paul Molitor (MOY)
2018	AL	Central	2nd	78	84	.481	13		
2019	AL	Central ^	1st	101	61	.623	—	Lost ALDS (Yankees) 3–0	Rocco Baldelli (MOY)
2020	AL	Central ^	1st	36	24	.600	—	Lost ALWC (Astros) 2–0	
2021	AL	Central	5th	73	89	.451	20		
2022	AL	Central	3rd	78	84	.481	14		
2023	AL	Central ^	1st	87	75	.537	—	Won ALWC (Blue Jays) 2–0; Lost ALDS (Astros) 3–1	
2024	AL	Central	4th	82	80	.506	10.5		
2025	AL	Central	4th	70	92	.432	18		
Totals				Wins	Losses	Win%			
Totals				4,223	4,864	.465	Washington Senators regular season record (1901–1960)		
Totals				5,106	5,183	.496	Minnesota Twins regular season record (1961–2025)		
Totals				9,329	10,047	.473	All-time regular season record (1901–2025)		
Totals				36	59	.379	All-time postseason record		
Totals				9,365	10,106	.473	All-time regular and postseason record		

== Record by decade ==
The following table describes the Twins' MLB win–loss record by decade.

Decade	Wins	Losses	Pct
1900s	480	833	.366
1910s	755	737	.506
1920s	792	735	.519
1930s	806	722	.527
1940s	677	858	.441
1950s	640	898	.416
1960s	862	747	.536
1970s	812	794	.506
1980s	733	833	.468
1990s	718	833	.463
2000s	863	758	.532
2010s	765	855	.472
2020s	426	444	.490
All-time	9,329	10,047	.481

These statistics are from Baseball-Reference.com's Minnesota Twins History & Encyclopedia, and are current as of the 2025 Major League Baseball season.

== Postseason record by year ==
The Twins have made the postseason eighteen times in their history, with their first being in 1924 and the most recent being in 2023.

Year	Finish	Round	Opponent	Result		
1924	World Series Champions	World Series	New York Giants	Won	4	3
1925	American League Champions	World Series	Pittsburgh Pirates	Lost	3	4
1933	American League Champions	World Series	New York Giants	Lost	1	4
1965	American League Champions	World Series	Los Angeles Dodgers	Lost	3	4
1969	American League West Champions	ALCS	Baltimore Orioles	Lost	0	3
1970	American League West Champions	ALCS	Baltimore Orioles	Lost	0	3
1987	World Series Champions	ALCS	Detroit Tigers	Won	4	1
1987	World Series Champions	World Series	St. Louis Cardinals	Won	4	3
1991	World Series Champions	ALCS	Toronto Blue Jays	Won	4	1
1991	World Series Champions	World Series	Atlanta Braves	Won	4	3
2002	American League Central Champions	ALDS	Oakland Athletics	Won	3	2
2002	American League Central Champions	ALCS	Anaheim Angels	Lost	1	4
2003	American League Central Champions	ALDS	New York Yankees	Lost	1	3
2004	American League Central Champions	ALDS	New York Yankees	Lost	1	3
2006	American League Central Champions	ALDS	Oakland Athletics	Lost	0	3
2009	American League Central Champions	ALDS	New York Yankees	Lost	0	3
2010	American League Central Champions	ALDS	New York Yankees	Lost	0	3
2017	American League Wild Card	Wild Card Game	New York Yankees	Lost	0	1
2019	American League Central Champions	ALDS	New York Yankees	Lost	0	3
2020	American League Central Champions	Wild Card Series	Houston Astros	Lost	0	2
2023	American League Central Champions	Wild Card Series	Toronto Blue Jays	Won	2	0
2023	American League Central Champions	ALDS	Houston Astros	Lost	1	3
18	Totals			7–15	36	59
