= Welteroth =

Welteroth is a surname. Notable people with the surname include:

- Dick Welteroth (1927–2014), American baseball player
- Elaine Welteroth (born 1986), American journalist, editor, author, and television host
