= Ramón García (1940s pitcher) =

Cuban baseball player (1924-2001)

- Pitcher
- Born: March 5, 1924; La Esperanza, Cuba
- Died: December 25, 2001 (aged 77); La Habana, Cuba
- Batted: Right Threw: Right

MLB debut
- April 19, 1948, for the Washington Senators

Last MLB appearance
- May 31, 1948, for the Washington Senators

MLB statistics
- Win–loss record: 0–0
- Earned run average: 17.18
- Inning pitched: 3 2/3
- Stats at Baseball Reference

Teams
- Washington Senators (1948)

Ramón García García (March 5, 1924 – December 25, 2001) was a Cuban professional baseball player. He appeared in four Major League games as a relief pitcher for the Washington Senators during the 1948 season. Listed at 5 feet 10 inches (1.78 m) tall and 170 pounds (77 kg), García batted and threw right-handed. He was born in La Esperanza, Cuba.

García posted a 17.18 earned run average and did not have a decision in four relief appearances, giving up seven runs on eleven hits and four walks while striking out two in 3 2/3 innings of work.

He also pitched in minor league baseball from 1948 through 1953, posting a 49–36 record and a 3.76 ERA in 153 games.

García died in La Habana, Cuba, at the age of 77.

== See also ==
- 1948 Washington Senators season
- List of Major League Baseball players from Cuba
