= Bob Ross (baseball) =

American baseball player (born 1928)

- Pitcher
- Born: November 2, 1928 (age 97); Fullerton, California, U.S.
- Batted: Right Threw: Left

MLB debut
- June 16, 1950, for the Washington Senators

Last MLB appearance
- May 8, 1956, for the Philadelphia Phillies

MLB statistics
- Win–loss record: 0–2
- Earned run average: 7.17
- Strikeouts: 29
- Stats at Baseball Reference

Teams
- Washington Senators (1950–1951); Philadelphia Phillies (1956)

Floyd Robert Ross (born November 2, 1928) is an American former professional baseball player, a left-handed pitcher who appeared in Major League Baseball (MLB) for the Washington Senators (1950–51) and Philadelphia Phillies (1956). He stood 6 feet (1.83 m) tall and weighed 165 pounds (75 kg).

Ross signed his first professional contract at age 16 with the Brooklyn Dodgers during 1945, the last year of World War II. After five seasons in the Dodger farm system, he was drafted by Washington and had six- and 11-game trials with the 1950 and 1951 Senators. He failed, however, to remain at the Major League level and spent at least part of each of his 13 professional seasons in the minor leagues. He missed the 1952 and 1953 seasons due to military service during the Korean War. Ross' final MLB trial came at the outset of the 1956 Phillies' season, but he appeared in only three games before being sent back to the minor leagues.

Ross appeared in 20 MLB games, and was winless in two decisions, giving up 55 hits and 38 bases on balls in 47 2/3 innings pitched, for a 1.95 walks plus hits per inning pitched. He struck out 29 opposing batters.
