= Hal Toenes =

American baseball player (1917-2004)

- Pitcher
- Born: October 8, 1917; Mobile, Alabama, U.S.
- Died: June 28, 2004 (aged 86); Tampa, Florida, U.S.
- Batted: Right Threw: Right

MLB debut
- September 17, 1947, for the Washington Senators

Last MLB appearance
- September 27, 1947, for the Washington Senators

MLB statistics
- Win–loss record: 0–1
- Earned run average: 6.75
- Strikeouts: 5
- Stats at Baseball Reference

Teams
- Washington Senators (1947)

William Harrel "Hal" Toenes (October 8, 1917 – June 28, 2004) was an American professional baseball pitcher who appeared in three games Major League Baseball for the Washington Senators in 1947. Born in Mobile, Alabama, Toenes was a right-hander who stood 5 feet 11 inches (1.80 m) tall and weighed 175 pounds (79 kg).

His career began in 1937 in the lower minor leagues and was interrupted by service in the United States Army Air Forces during World War II; he missed the seasons of 1942 through 1945. Returning to baseball in 1946, he won 16 games the following season for Double-A Chattanooga and was rewarded, at age 29, with a callup to the parent Senators in September 1947. After a scoreless relief appearance on September 17 against the Cleveland Indians, Toenes was given the starting pitcher assignment three days later at Fenway Park against the Boston Red Sox. He went four innings, allowing nine hits (including doubles to Johnny Pesky and Dom DiMaggio, and a triple to Ted Williams), and was tagged with the eventual 7–2 Washington defeat. But he returned to face the Red Sox in relief seven days later at Griffith Stadium and hurled 12/3 innings of shutout ball in what would be his last MLB appearance. Altogether, in his 62/3 MLB innings pitched, he allowed 11 hits and five earned runs. He walked two and struck out five.

Toenes returned to the minors in 1948 and 1949 and retired in 1951 after sitting out the 1950 campaign. He died in Tampa at age 86 in 2004.
