= Cal Cooper =

American baseball player (1922–1994)

- Pitcher
- Born: August 11, 1922; Great Falls, South Carolina, U.S.
- Died: July 4, 1994 (aged 71); Clinton, South Carolina, U.S.
- Batted: Right Threw: Right

MLB debut
- September 14, 1948, for the Washington Senators

Last MLB appearance
- September 14, 1948, for the Washington Senators

MLB statistics
- Games played: 1
- Innings pitched: 1
- Earned runs: 5
- Stats at Baseball Reference

Teams
- Washington Senators (1948)

Calvin Asa Cooper (August 11, 1922 – July 4, 1994) was an American Major League Baseball pitcher. Cooper appeared in one game for the Washington Senators. Prior to his major league debut and exit, he attended and played for Newberry College. Cooper batted and threw right-handed.

== Early life ==
Cooper was born in 1922 in Great Falls, South Carolina, a small town in the north central portion of the state. As a young man, Cooper served in the US Navy during World War II. After military service, Cooper attended Newberry College, a small Lutheran college in Newberry, South Carolina. At age 26, he was called up from the Triple-A organization of the Washington Senators to play in the majors.

== Major League Baseball career ==
Cooper made his major league debut on September 14, 1948, with the Washington Senators. Cooper competed in one game in 1948, wearing uniform number 16. His major league career thus consisted of pitching one inning, in which he surrendered five hits, allowing five runs including a home run, and walked a batter, before recording three outs. Being his only appearance, he ended his career with his lifetime earned run average (ERA) of 45.00.

== After baseball ==
After his single afternoon in a major league baseball uniform, Cooper returned to South Carolina where he worked as a personnel director at Clinton Mills in the town of Clinton. Cooper died on July 4, 1994, in Clinton, South Carolina. For 28 years prior to his death in 1994, Cooper served as a member of the Laurens County School Board. He is buried at Pinelawn Memory Gardens in Clinton.
