= Joe Kuhel =

American baseball player & manager (1906–1984)

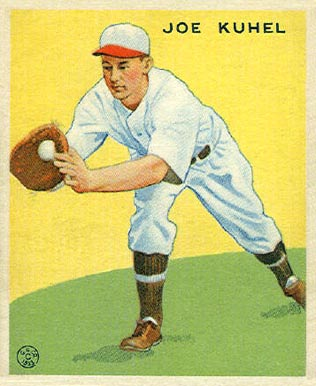
- First baseman / Manager
- Born: June 25, 1906; Cleveland, Ohio, U.S.
- Died: February 26, 1984 (aged 77); Kansas City, Kansas, U.S.
- Batted: Left Threw: Left

MLB debut
- July 31, 1930, for the Washington Senators

Last MLB appearance
- May 11, 1947, for the Chicago White Sox

MLB statistics
- Batting average: .277
- Hits: 2,212
- Home runs: 131
- Runs batted in: 1,049
- Managerial record: 106–201
- Winning %: .345
- Stats at Baseball Reference

Teams
- As player: Washington Senators (1930–1937); Chicago White Sox (1938–1943); Washington Senators (1944–1946); Chicago White Sox (1946–1947); As manager: Washington Senators (1948–1949)

Joseph Anthony Kuhel (June 25, 1906 – February 26, 1984) was an American professional baseball player and manager. Born in Cleveland, Ohio, he was a first baseman who played in the Major Leagues from 1930 to 1947, primarily for the Washington Senators, where he played 11 of his 18 seasons. He also played for the Chicago White Sox for seven seasons (1938–1943, 1946–1947). He batted and threw left-handed, stood 6 feet (1.8 m) tall and weighed 180 pounds (82 kg). Following his playing career, Kuhel managed the Senators (1948–49). In an 18-season career, Kuhel was a .277 hitter with 131 home runs and 1,049 RBI in 2,104 games played. Defensively, he posted a career .992 fielding percentage.

Kuhel was the best defensive first baseman in the American League during the 1930s, but also was an inconsistent player who struggled with injuries most of his career. Hampered by playing in Griffith Stadium most of his career, his power numbers were never as good as they may have been in a more favorable park for long-ball hitters.

== Career ==
Kuhel started his major league career with the Washington in 1930 and replaced Joe Judge on a regular basis a year later. He appeared in 139 games, batting .269 with eight home runs and 85 RBI. In the Senators' pennant year of 1933, Kuhel hit 11 home runs with 107 RBIs and posted career-highs in batting average (.322) and hits (194). He also led AL first basemen with 1,498 putouts. He batted just .150 (3-for-20) in the 1933 World Series in his only postseason appearance.

Kuhel seemed headed to another solid season in 1934, hitting .289 with three homers in 63 games, but he suffered a broken ankle in July and was out for the remainder of the season. He was healthy in 1935, hitting .261 with 74 RBIs in 151 games. His most productive season came in 1936, when he hit .321 with 16 home runs and set career-highs in doubles (42), RBIs (118) and slugging percentage (.502), while stealing 15 bases and struck out just 30 times. He finished sixth in the American League MVP Award voting tied with Vern Kennedy, behind Lou Gehrig, Luke Appling, Earl Averill, Charlie Gehringer and Bill Dickey, and over Joe DiMaggio, Tommy Bridges, Hal Trosky and Jimmie Foxx.

After his stellar season, Kuhel slumped in 1937, batting .283 but with low numbers in home runs, RBIs and slugging (6, 61, .400). Before the 1938 season he was traded to the Chicago White Sox for slugger Zeke Bonura in a swap of first basemen. In the more forgiving Comiskey Park, Kuhel hit for more power, averaging 18 home runs from 1939 to 1941, and tying Bonura's franchise record with 27 homers in 1940. But after struggling to .249, four homers, 52 RBIs in 1942, and .213, 5, 46 in 1943, Kuhel was let go by Chicago.

Before the 1944 season Kuhel returned to Washington. He hit .282 in his first two seasons back in a Senators' uniform, but when Mickey Vernon returned from World War II in 1946, Kuhel was expendable and was sold back to the White Sox in the midseason. After three pinch-hit appearances in 1947 he retired as a player to manage a White Sox farm team, the Class C Hot Springs Bathers.

Then, in 1948 Kuhel was brought back to Washington to manage the Senators. In two seasons, he had a 106–201 (.345) record that produced seventh- and eighth-place finishes. After being fired, he managed the Kansas City Blues in the American Association.

Kuhel died in Kansas City, Kansas, at the age of 77.

== See also ==
- List of Major League Baseball career hits leaders
- List of Major League Baseball career doubles leaders
- List of Major League Baseball career triples leaders
- List of Major League Baseball career runs scored leaders
- List of Major League Baseball career runs batted in leaders
- List of Major League Baseball career stolen bases leaders
