= Jim Clark (infielder) =

American baseball player (1927-1990)

- Pinch hitter
- Born: September 21, 1927; Baggaley, Pennsylvania, U.S.
- Died: October 24, 1990 (aged 63); Santa Monica, California, U.S.
- Batted: Right Threw: Right

MLB debut
- August 17, 1948, for the Washington Senators

Last MLB appearance
- September 8, 1948, for the Washington Senators

MLB statistics
- Games played: 9
- At bats: 12
- Hits: 3
- Stats at Baseball Reference

Teams
- Washington Senators (1948)

James Clark (September 21, 1927 – October 24, 1990) was an American Major League Baseball player who played in nine games for the Washington Senators in 1948. He was used as a pinch hitter in seven of his nine games.
