= Steve Nagy (baseball) =

American baseball player (1919–2016)

- Pitcher
- Born: May 28, 1919; Franklin, New Jersey, U.S.
- Died: July 24, 2016 (aged 97); Poulsbo, Washington, U.S.
- Batted: Left Threw: Left

MLB debut
- April 20, 1947, for the Pittsburgh Pirates

Last MLB appearance
- June 23, 1950, for the Washington Senators

MLB statistics
- Win–loss record: 3–8
- Earned run average: 6.42
- Strikeouts/Walks: 21/38
- Innings pitched: 67 ⅓
- Games pitched: 15
- Stats at Baseball Reference

Teams
- Pittsburgh Pirates (1947); Washington Senators (1950)

Stephen Nagy (May 28, 1919 – July 24, 2016) was an American pitcher in Major League Baseball who played parts of two seasons for the Pittsburgh Pirates in 1947 and the Washington Senators in 1950. Listed at 5' 9", 174 lb., Nagy batted and threw left handed.

== Biography ==
Born in Franklin, New Jersey, Nagy attended Franklin High School and graduated from Seton Hall University in South Orange, New Jersey. He also had a Minor League career in all or parts of 14 seasons spanning 1942–1958, being interrupted while serving in the Navy during World War II. Nagy died in 2016 in Poulsbo, Washington, at the age of 97. At the time of his death, he was the seventh oldest living MLB player, as well as the oldest living member of the Pirates and the Senators.
