= Herman Reich =

American baseball player (1917–2009)

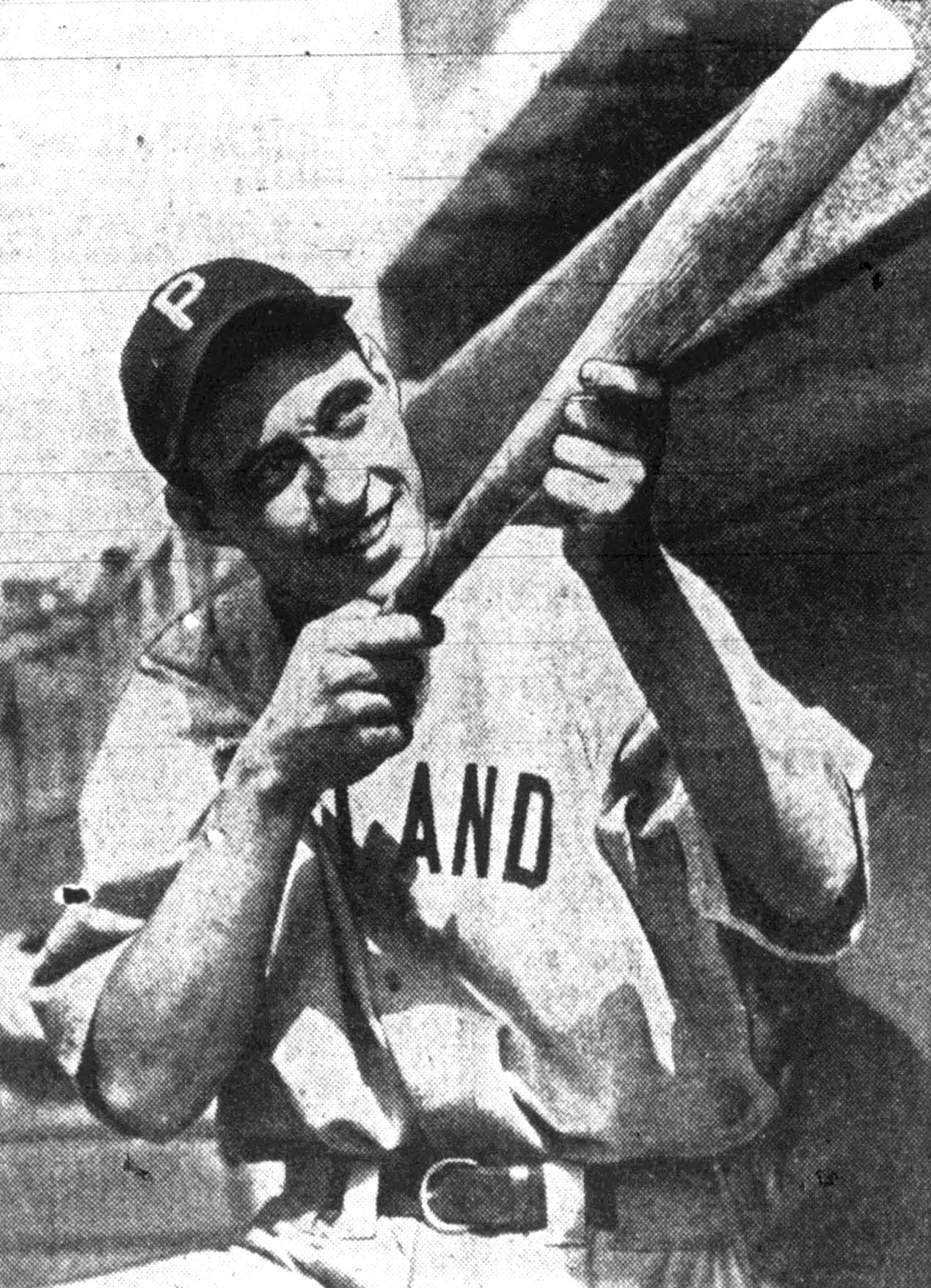
- Reich, circa 1941
- First baseman/Right fielder
- Born: November 23, 1917; Bell, California, U.S.
- Died: October 22, 2009 (aged 91); Fallbrook, California, U.S.
- Batted: Right Threw: Left

MLB debut
- May 3, 1949, for the Washington Senators

Last MLB appearance
- October 2, 1949, for the Chicago Cubs

MLB statistics
- Batting average: .279
- Home runs: 3
- Runs batted in: 34
- Stats at Baseball Reference

Teams
- Washington Senators (1949); Cleveland Indians (1949); Chicago Cubs (1949)

Herman Charles Reich (November 23, 1917 – October 22, 2009) was an American first baseman/right fielder in Major League Baseball who played for three teams during the 1949 season. Listed at 6 ft 2 in (1.88 m), 200 lb (91 kg), Reich batted right-handed and threw left-handed. A native of Bell, California, he attended Loyola Marymount University.

== Biography ==
Reich has the rare distinction of being part of three transactions in his only major league season. He appeared in three games with the Cleveland Indians (1) and Washington Senators (2) before joining the Chicago Cubs, all during 8 days. He became the regular first baseman for the Cubs and also was among the team's nine right fielders. Before the 1950 season, he was sold by the Cubs to the Chicago White Sox but did not play for them.

In a one-season career, Reich was a .279 hitter (108-for-286) with three home runs and 34 RBI in 111 games, including 43 runs, 18 doubles, two triples, four stolen bases, and a .306 on-base percentage.

Following his brief stint in major leagues, Reich resumed his career in the minors and also managed the 1961 Idaho Falls Russets of the Pioneer League.

== Transactions ==
- Nov. 10, 1948 – Drafted by the Cleveland Indians from the Portland Beavers (PCL) in the rule 5 draft.
- Apr. 30, 1949 – Selected off waivers by the Washington Senators from the Indians.
- May 10, 1949 – Returned to the Indians by Washington following previous waiver selection.
- May 18, 1949 – Selected off waivers by the Chicago Cubs from the Indians.
- Feb. 2, 1950 – Purchased by the Chicago White Sox from the Cubs.

== Throws left/Bats right ==
- Notably, Reich also was one of those rare players who were not primarily pitchers in major league history who threw left-handed but batted right-handed. Other such players include Johnny Cooney, Rickey Henderson, Cleon Jones, Chucho Ramos, Cody Ross, Ryan Ludwick and Jimmy Ryan.
