= Julio González (pitcher) =

Cuban baseball player (1920-1991)

- Pitcher
- Born: December 20, 1920; Banes, Cuba
- Died: February 15, 1991 (aged 70); Banes, Cuba
- Batted: Right Threw: Right

MLB debut
- August 9, 1949, for the Washington Senators

Last MLB appearance
- September 25, 1949, for the Washington Senators

MLB statistics
- Win–loss record: 0-0
- Earned run average: 4.72
- Strikeouts: 5
- Stats at Baseball Reference

Teams
- Washington Senators (1949)

Julio Enrique González Herrera (December 20, 1920 – February 15, 1991) was a Cuban Major League Baseball pitcher who played for the Washington Senators in 1949.
