= Ed Lyons =

American baseball player (1923–2009)

- Second baseman
- Born: May 12, 1923; Winston-Salem, North Carolina, U.S.
- Died: January 25, 2009 (aged 85); Winston-Salem, North Carolina, U.S.
- Batted: Right Threw: Right

MLB debut
- September 15, 1947, for the Washington Senators

Last MLB appearance
- September 28, 1947, for the Washington Senators

MLB statistics
- Batting average: .154
- Hits: 4
- Runs: 2
- Stats at Baseball Reference

Teams
- Washington Senators (1947)

Edward Hoyte Lyons (May 12, 1923 – January 25, 2009), nicknamed "Mouse", was an American Major League Baseball second baseman who played for the Washington Senators in 1947.

Born in Winston-Salem, North Carolina, Lyons signed a contract out of Richard J. Reynolds High School with the Washington Senators when he was 17. While in the minor leagues, his baseball career was interrupted by World War II when he joined the United States Navy. He made his Major League debut with the Washington Senators in 1947. He played 7 games at second base and hit .154 in his only season in the Major Leagues. When his playing career ended he became a manager for the Senators, Red Sox, and Cardinals organizations. His coaching career came to an end after a leg injury and he served as a scout, ending with the Chicago Cubs in 1995. He was inducted into the Winston-Salem Baseball Hall of Fame in 1998. After his retirement, he resided in Clemmons, North Carolina and died on January 25, 2009, in Winston-Salem.
