= Lloyd Hittle =

American baseball player (1924–2012)

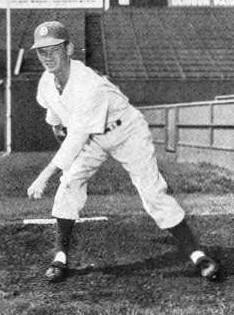
- Hittle in 1948
- Pitcher
- Born: February 21, 1924; Lodi, California, U.S.
- Died: March 3, 2012 (aged 88); Lodi, California, U.S.
- Batted: Right Threw: Left

MLB debut
- June 12, 1949, for the Washington Senators

Last MLB appearance
- June 11, 1950, for the Washington Senators

MLB statistics
- Win–loss record: 7–11
- Earned run average: 4.43
- Strikeouts: 41
- Innings pitched: 1521/3
- Stats at Baseball Reference

Teams
- Washington Senators (1949–1950)

Lloyd Eldon "Red" Hittle (February 21, 1924 – March 3, 2012) was an American professional baseball player. The left-handed pitcher appeared in 47 games in Major League Baseball for the 1949–50 Washington Senators. Born in Lodi, California, Hittle stood 5 feet 10 inches (1.78 m) tall and weighed 164 pounds (74 kg).

Hittle served in the United States Army during World War II and began his professional career in 1946 pitching for the unaffiliated Oakland Oaks of the Pacific Coast League and lower-classification teams on the West Coast. The Oaks controlled his rights until May 24, 1949, when they traded him to Washington for pitcher Milo Candini. During his rookie season, Hittle made nine starts among his 36 appearances, and notched three complete games and two shutouts. The whitewashings occurred August 7 and 30 against the Chicago White Sox. In the latter game, Hittle went ten innings and allowed only three hits as the Senators won, 1–0. As a rookie, he won five of 12 decisions with a 4.21 earned run average

Hittle spent the early weeks of the 1950 campaign with Washington, working in 11 games with four more starts. On May 9, he tamed the White Sox again, allowing two runs but registering his final MLB complete game in a 3–2 victory. After his final appearance with Washington, a starting assignment against the Detroit Tigers on June 11, he returned to minor league baseball, pitching through 1954—largely in the Pacific Coast League.

In the big leagues, Hittle allowed 183 hits and 74 bases on balls in 1521/3 innings of work. He struck out 41.
