= Dizzy Sutherland =

American baseball player (1922-1979)

- Pitcher
- Born: April 9, 1922; Washington, D.C.
- Died: August 26, 1979 (aged 57); Washington, D.C.
- Batted: Left Threw: Left

MLB debut
- September 20, 1949, for the Washington Senators

Last MLB appearance
- September 20, 1949, for the Washington Senators

MLB statistics
- Win–loss record: 0-1
- Earned run average: 45.00
- Strikeouts: 0
- Stats at Baseball Reference

Teams
- Washington Senators (1949)

Howard Alvin "Dizzy" Sutherland (April 9, 1922 – August 26, 1979) was a Major League Baseball pitcher who played in 1949 with the Washington Senators. He batted and threw left-handed.

He was born and died in Washington, D.C.
