= Al Kozar =

American baseball player (1921–2007)

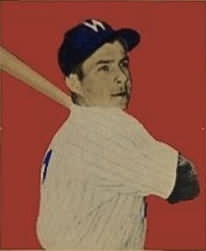
- Kozar's 1949 Bowman Gum baseball card
- Second baseman
- Born: July 5, 1921; McKees Rocks, Pennsylvania, U.S.
- Died: September 6, 2007 (aged 86); Palm Beach Gardens, Florida, U.S.
- Batted: Right Threw: Right

MLB debut
- April 19, 1948, for the Washington Senators

Last MLB appearance
- July 2, 1950, for the Chicago White Sox

MLB statistics
- Batting average: .254
- Home runs: 6
- Runs batted in: 94
- Stats at Baseball Reference

Teams
- Washington Senators (1948–1950); Chicago White Sox (1950)

Albert Kenneth Kozar (July 5, 1921 – September 6, 2007) was an American second baseman in Major League Baseball. He played for the Washington Senators and Chicago White Sox over a three-year career in the Major Leagues.

Born in McKees Rocks, Pennsylvania, Kozar was signed by the Boston Red Sox as an amateur free agent in 1941. Kozar played for the Red Sox's minor league affiliates, interrupted by a three-year break when Kozar served in the United States Army.

On December 10, 1947, Kozar was traded to the Washington Senators along with Leon Culberson in exchange for Stan Spence. Kozar made his Major League debut with the Senators on April 19, 1948, at Griffith Stadium, going 1–for–4 against the New York Yankees. Kozar played for the Senators until 1950, when he was traded on May 31 to the Chicago White Sox along with Eddie Robinson and Ray Scarborough, in exchange for Bob Kuzava, Cass Michaels and Johnny Ostrowski. Kozar continued to play in the minor leagues until 1954, and died on September 6, 2007, in Palm Beach Gardens, Florida.
