= Jim Pearce (baseball) =

American baseball player (1925-2005)

- Pitcher
- Born: June 9, 1925; Zebulon, North Carolina, U.S.
- Died: July 17, 2005 (aged 80); Raleigh, North Carolina, U.S.
- Batted: Right Threw: Right

MLB debut
- September 8, 1949, for the Washington Senators

Last MLB appearance
- May 3, 1955, for the Cincinnati Redlegs

MLB statistics
- Win–loss record: 3–4
- Earned run average: 5.78
- Strikeouts: 22
- Stats at Baseball Reference

Teams
- Washington Senators (1949–1950, 1953); Cincinnati Redlegs (1954–1955)

James Madison Pearce (June 9, 1925 – July 17, 2005) was an American professional baseball player and right-handed pitcher. His pro career encompassed 15 seasons and 426 games pitched, including 30 games in Major League Baseball over all or parts of five seasons, between 1949 and 1955, for the Washington Senators and Cincinnati Redlegs. The native of Zebulon, North Carolina, was listed as 6 feet 6 inches (1.98 m) tall and 180 pounds (82 kg).

Pearce's lone full season came with Washington in 1950. He worked in 20 games, including three starting pitcher assignments, and won two of three decisions, including his first MLB complete game, a 9–3 triumph against the St. Louis Browns on August 28 at Griffith Stadium. But he posted an abysmal 6.04 earned run average over the season in 562/3 innings pitched, didn't get another trial with the Senators until April 1953, and would work in only eight more big-league games in his career.

Acquired by Cincinnati after an outstanding 1954 season in the Double-A Southern Association, Pearce was highly effective in two September 1954 appearances. He held the Brooklyn Dodgers scoreless in a two-inning relief stint at Ebbets Field on September 14. Then, six days later, he was selected to start against another first-division team, the Milwaukee Braves, at County Stadium. Pearce threw a complete game, 3–1 victory, with Milwaukee's only run scoring unearned when the Redlegs made two errors in the field in the seventh inning.

The following April 16, Pearce tried to duplicate his success against the Braves, starting against them at Cincinnati's Crosley Field. He allowed an unearned run in the second inning, and then was driven from the mound in the third when Milwaukee strung together four straight hits, good for three runs. Pearce was charged with the 9–5 loss. He made one final appearance in the majors as a relief pitcher over two weeks later, allowing one earned run in one inning pitched against the Philadelphia Phillies. He spent the rest of his career in the minor leagues, retiring after the 1959 season.

His major league career consisted of 30 games pitched, a 3–4 win–loss record, with 97 hits and 53 bases on balls allowed and 22 strikeouts in 852/3 innings pitched. His career earned run average was 5.78.
