= Roberto Ortiz (baseball) =

Cuban baseball player (1915–1971)

- Outfielder
- Born: June 30, 1915; Camagüey, Cuba
- Died: September 15, 1971 (aged 56); Miami, Florida, U.S.
- Batted: Right Threw: Right

MLB debut
- September 6, 1941, for the Washington Senators

Last MLB appearance
- September 2, 1950, for the Philadelphia Athletics

MLB statistics
- Batting average: .255
- Home runs: 8
- Runs batted in: 78
- Stats at Baseball Reference

Teams
- Washington Senators (1941–1944, 1949–1950); Philadelphia Athletics (1950)

Member of the Mexican Professional

Baseball Hall of Fame
- Induction: 1973
Medals
Men's baseball
Representing Cuba
Central American and Caribbean Games
Gold medal – first place	1938 Panama	Team

Roberto Gonzalo Ortiz Núñez (June 30, 1915 – September 15, 1971) was a Cuban professional baseball player. He was an outfielder over parts of six major-league seasons between 1941 and 1950 with the Washington Senators and Philadelphia Athletics. For his career, he compiled a .255 batting average with eight home runs and 78 runs batted in in 213 games played.

In the Cuban League, he won the batting title in the 1943–44 season, hitting .337.

Ortiz was born in Camagüey, Cuba, in 1915 and died in Miami in 1971, aged 56. He was inducted to the Mexican Professional Baseball Hall of Fame in 1973.
