= Marino Pieretti =

Italian baseball player (1920–1981)

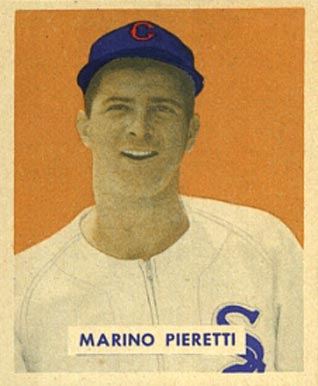
- Pitcher
- Born: September 23, 1920; Lucca, Tuscany, Italy
- Died: January 30, 1981 (aged 60); San Francisco, California, U.S.
- Batted: Right Threw: Right

MLB debut
- April 19, 1945, for the Washington Senators

Last MLB appearance
- October 1, 1950, for the Cleveland Indians

MLB statistics
- Win–loss record: 30–38
- Earned run average: 4.53
- Strikeouts: 188
- Stats at Baseball Reference

Teams
- Washington Senators (1945–1948); Chicago White Sox (1948–1949); Cleveland Indians (1950)

Marino Paul Pieretti (September 23, 1920 – January 30, 1981) was an Italian-born American professional baseball player. He played in the major-leagues from 1945 through 1950 in the American League for the Washington Senators, Chicago White Sox, and Cleveland Indians.

== Biography ==
Born in Lucca, (Note: Pieretti's draft registration card of February 1942 lists his place of birth as Marlia, Italy. This may be a reference to it:Marlia, which is located in Capannori in the Province of Lucca. Contemporary newspaper reports also note his place of birth as Marlia, Lucca, Italy.) in Tuscany, Pieretti grew up in San Francisco's North Beach district. He was a right-handed pitcher who appeared in 194 major-league games, 68 as a starting pitcher.

Pieretti stood 5 feet 7 inches (1.70 m) tall and weighed 153 pounds (69 kg). A stalwart in the Pacific Coast League (PDL) of the era (he won 122 games and lost 112 for various PCL teams between 1943 and 1956), he came to the major leagues after winning 26 games for the 1944 Portland Beavers. He was known as "submariner" in his stint with the Beavers, because of his sidearm delivery.

His major-league rookie season was his finest. Pitching for the second-place Senators, he won 14 of 27 decisions and completed 14 of his 27 starting assignments, hurling three shutouts. For his major-league career, he compiled a 30–38 win–loss record with an earned run average (ERA) of 4.53 in 673 2/3 innings pitched, allowing 713 hits and 321 bases on balls. He notched 188 career strikeouts, eight saves and 21 complete games.

Pieretti, who worked in a slaughterhouse in the offseason, lived in San Francisco after his playing days. When he was stricken with cancer in the mid-1970s, his friends—many of them former baseball players from the Bay Area—organized "The Friends of Marino Pieretti" to buoy his spirits. Pieretti's health improved for a time, and he was able to attend regular meetings until his death at age 60 early in 1981. However, The Friends of Marino Pieretti were still meeting in his honor every month as of January 2011. he was interred at Holy Cross Cemetery in Colma, California.
