= Forrest Thompson =

American baseball player (1918–1979)

- Pitcher
- Born: March 3, 1918; Mooresville, North Carolina, U.S.
- Died: February 26, 1979 (aged 60); Charlotte, North Carolina, U.S.
- Batted: Left Threw: Left

MLB debut
- April 26, 1948, for the Washington Senators

Last MLB appearance
- June 5, 1949, for the Washington Senators

MLB statistics
- Win–loss record: 7–13
- Earned run average: 3.90
- Innings: 147 2/3
- Stats at Baseball Reference

Teams
- Washington Senators (1948–1949)

David Forrest Thompson (March 3, 1918 – February 26, 1979) was an American pitcher in Major League Baseball who played from 1948 through 1949 for the Washington Senators. Listed at 5 ft 11 in (1.80 m), 195 pounds (88 kg), Thompson batted and threw left-handed. He was born in Mooresville, North Carolina.

In a two-season Major League Baseball career, he posted a 7–13 record with a decent 3.90 ERA in 55 appearances, including eight starts, one complete game and four saves, giving up 82 runs (18 unearned) on 156 hits and 63 walks while striking out 48 in 147 2/3 innings of work. He also helped himself with the bat, hitting for a .325 average (13-for-40) with four RBI and a .450 slugging percentage.

Thompson died in Charlotte, North Carolina, at the age of 60.

== Highlights ==
- In 1948, Thompson ranked fourth in the American League both in games pitched (46) and games finished (24).
