= Jay Difani =

American baseball player (1922-2003)

- Second baseman
- Born: December 21, 1922; Crystal City, Missouri, U.S.
- Died: December 3, 2003 (aged 80); Crystal City, Missouri, U.S.
- Batted: Right Threw: Right

MLB debut
- April 23, 1948, for the Washington Senators

Last MLB appearance
- April 28, 1949, for the Washington Senators

MLB statistics
- Batting average: .333
- Home runs: 0
- Runs batted in: 0
- Stats at Baseball Reference

Teams
- Washington Senators (1948–1949)

Clarence Joseph "Jay" Difani (December 21, 1922 – December 3, 2003) was an American professional baseball player. He was a second baseman over parts of two seasons (1948–49) with the Washington Senators. For his career, he compiled a .333 batting average with one hit in three at-bats.

An alumnus of the University of Missouri, he was born in and, later, died in Crystal City, Missouri at the age of 80.
