= Junior Wooten =

American baseball player (1924-2006)

- Outfielder
- Born: January 16, 1924; Pelzer, South Carolina
- Died: August 12, 2006 (aged 82); Williamston, South Carolina
- Batted: Right Threw: Left

MLB debut
- September 16, 1947, for the Washington Senators

Last MLB appearance
- September 30, 1948, for the Washington Senators

MLB statistics
- Batting average: .241
- Home runs: 1
- Runs batted in: 24
- Stats at Baseball Reference

Teams
- Washington Senators (1947–1948)

Earl Hazwell "Junior" Wooten (January 16, 1924 – August 12, 2006) was a professional baseball player. He played part of 1947 and all of 1948 in Major League Baseball for the Washington Senators, primarily as an outfielder.
