= Buzz Dozier =

American baseball player (1928-2005)

- Pitcher
- Born: August 31, 1928; Waco, Texas, U.S.
- Died: November 24, 2005 (aged 77); Waco, Texas, U.S.
- Batted: Right Threw: Right

MLB debut
- September 12, 1947, for the Washington Senators

Last MLB appearance
- September 20, 1949, for the Washington Senators

MLB statistics
- Win–loss record: 0–0
- Earned run average: 6.55
- Strikeouts: 3
- Stats at Baseball Reference

Teams
- Washington Senators (1947, 1949)

William Joseph Dozier III (August 31, 1928 – November 24, 2005), known as "Buzz", was an American professional baseball pitcher who appeared in four Major League Baseball games for the 1947 and 1949 Washington Senators. A native and lifelong resident of Waco, Texas, he threw and batted right-handed and was listed as 6 feet 3 inches (1.91 m) tall and 185 pounds (84 kg).

Dozier starred in football and baseball at Waco High School and turned down a joint scholarship in those sports from Texas Christian University to sign a professional baseball contract with Washington in August 1947. He jumped immediately to the American League the following month and made his MLB debut on September 12 at Griffith Stadium against the St. Louis Browns. Coming into the contest in the eighth inning with Washington trailing 9–3, Dozier proceeded to strike out the first man to bat against him, veteran infielder and future soap opera star Johnny Berardino. In two scoreless frames, he faced the minimum of six opposing batters and allowed only one hit, a single to Les Moss, who was erased on a caught stealing. Two days later, he threw two more shutout innings of relief, this time against the Detroit Tigers, permitting only one hit and one base on balls.

However, two years later, Dozier was ineffective in his third major-league game, a one-sided loss to the eventual 1949 World Series champion New York Yankees on September 11. He entered the game at Yankee Stadium with two out in the fourth and the Bombers already ahead, 11–0. Dozier threw the final 51/3 innings, allowing an inherited runner to score, then eight earned runs of his own, as New York triumphed, 20–5. In his final big-league appearance nine days later, he threw one scoreless inning on September 20, 1949 against St. Louis in another lopsided Senator defeat.

All told, in his four MLB games, all in relief, Dozier allowed 14 hits and seven bases on balls in 11 innings pitched. he struck out three. All eight earned runs charged against him came in his "mop up" performance against the Yankees on September 11, 1949. He did not gain a decision and compiled a career earned run average of 6.55. Dozier pitched in the minor leagues through 1951 before leaving pro baseball.

He attended Baylor University in his hometown, where he raised his family and became a longtime Waco businessman, spending 37 years as a manufacturer's representative in the apparel industry. He died, aged 77, on November 24, 1955.
