= Clyde Vollmer =

American baseball player (1921–2006)

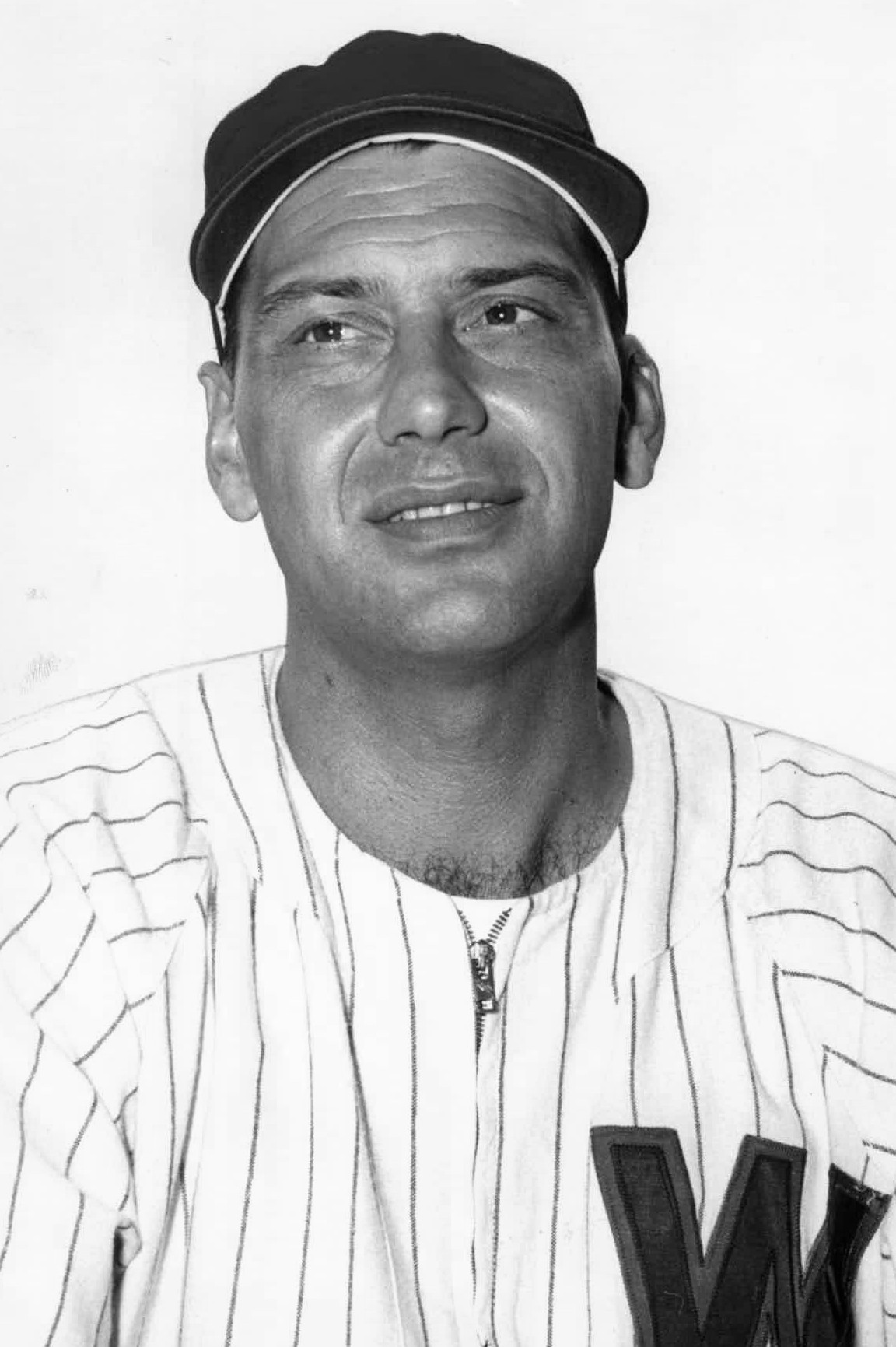
- Outfielder
- Born: September 24, 1921; Cincinnati, Ohio, U.S.
- Died: October 2, 2006 (aged 85); Florence, Kentucky, U.S.
- Batted: Right Threw: Right

MLB debut
- May 31, 1942, for the Cincinnati Reds

Last MLB appearance
- September, 1, 1954, for the Washington Senators

MLB statistics
- Batting average: .251
- Home runs: 69
- Runs batted in: 339
- Stats at Baseball Reference

Teams
- Cincinnati Reds (1942, 1946–1948); Washington Senators (1948–1950); Boston Red Sox (1950–1953); Washington Senators (1953–1954)

Clyde Frederick Vollmer (September 24, 1921 – October 2, 2006) was an American professional baseball outfielder who played in 685 games in Major League Baseball (MLB) for the Cincinnati Reds, Washington Senators and Boston Red Sox. During the 1951 season with the Red Sox, his hot hitting earned him the nickname "Dutch the Clutch." As an active player, Vollmer threw and batted right-handed; he stood 6 feet 1 inch (1.85 m) tall and weighed 185 pounds (84 kg).

== Early life ==
Vollmer was born in Cincinnati, Ohio. As a youth, he played for the Bridgetown Baseball League in Hamilton County and was a leader on the team that won the Hamilton County Grade School baseball championship in 1935, according to a publication called "News of the Reds" dated May 20, 1947.

== Professional career ==
Vollmer graduated from Western Hills High School in 1938 and signed as a free agent with the Reds the following year. After three full seasons, and part of a fourth, in their farm system, Vollmer debuted with the Reds on May 31, 1942. The 20-year-old started in left field against the Pittsburgh Pirates at Crosley Field and connected for a solo home run in his first MLB at bat off veteran pitcher Max Butcher in the third inning. His blow broke a scoreless tie and was the game-winning hit in a 3–0 Cincinnati victory.

Vollmer joined the United States Army after the 1942 season and served in World War II for three years. After his discharge, Vollmer returned to the Reds, playing one game in 1946 and the remainder of the campaign at Triple-A. He spent all of 1947 on the Cincinnati roster, but batted only .219 with one homer. Then, after seven early-season appearances in 1948, he was sent back to Triple-A, where he hit 32 homers for Syracuse. On September 27, he was traded to the Washington Senators, and he would spend the remainder of his big-league tenure in the American League.

He appeared in 129 games for Washington in 1949 and hit 14 home runs, then was traded to the Red Sox in the early weeks of 1950. His torrid stretch as a member of the 1951 Bosox lasted from July 6–28. In 21 games played, Vollmer had 31 hits, including 13 homers, four doubles, one triple, 40 runs batted in (RBI), and 25 runs scored. The streak saw him raise his batting average from .267 to .287 and included a three-homer game on July 26 against the Chicago White Sox at Fenway Park. For the season, however, Vollmer leveled off to a .251 average (matching his career mark), although he set personal bests in homers (22) and RBI (85). Boston sent him back to the Senators in 1953, and he finished his MLB career in September 1954 as a reserve outfielder and pinch hitter. In his 685 games in the majors, Vollmer had 508 total hits, including 77 doubles, and 69 homers. Vollmer recorded a .984 fielding percentage at all three outfield positions.

== Personal and later life ==
In 1947, Vollmer married and later had a daughter, Claudia. Vollmer retired from baseball and acquired the Lark Lounge, which he owned for 20 years. He later was a member of the American Legion, the Fraternal Order of Eagles, Cheviot Aerie No. 2197, and the Delhi Senior Citizens.

Vollmer died on October 2, 2006, at St. Luke Hospital in Florence, Kentucky. He is interred at Old St. Joseph's Cemetery in Cincinnati.

== See also ==
- List of Major League Baseball players with a home run in their first major league at bat
