= John Sullivan (shortstop) =

American baseball player (1920-2007)

- Shortstop
- Born: November 2, 1920; Chicago, Illinois, U.S.
- Died: September 20, 2007 (aged 86); Homewood, Illinois, U.S.
- Batted: Right Threw: Right

MLB debut
- June 7, 1942, for the Washington Senators

Last MLB appearance
- October 2, 1949, for the St. Louis Browns

MLB statistics
- Batting average: .230
- Home runs: 1
- Runs batted in: 162
- Stats at Baseball Reference

Teams
- Washington Senators (1942–1944, 1947–1948); St. Louis Browns (1949)

John Paul Sullivan (November 2, 1920 – September 20, 2007) was an American professional baseball shortstop who played in Major League Baseball (MLB) for the Washington Senators and St. Louis Browns. Sullivan was the Senators' starting shortstop from 1942 until 1944, when his career was interrupted by World War II. Upon his return in 1947, he was mainly used as a reserve. Sullivan was a lifelong resident of Homewood.
