= Mark Christman =

American baseball player (1913–1976)

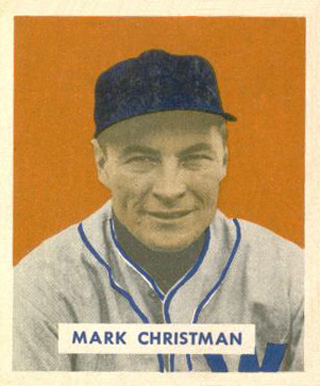
- Third baseman / Shortstop
- Born: October 21, 1913; Maplewood, Missouri, U.S.
- Died: October 9, 1976 (aged 62); St. Louis, Missouri, U.S.

MLB debut
- April 20, 1938, for the Detroit Tigers

Last MLB appearance
- September 23, 1949, for the Washington Senators

MLB statistics
- Batting average: .253
- Home runs: 19
- Runs batted in: 348
- Stats at Baseball Reference

Teams
- Detroit Tigers (1938–1939); St. Louis Browns (1939, 1943–1946); Washington Senators (1947–1949)

Marquette Joseph "Mark" Christman (October 21, 1913 – October 9, 1976) was an American professional baseball third baseman and shortstop who appeared in 911 games in Major League Baseball (MLB) for the Detroit Tigers, St. Louis Browns and Washington Senators in nine seasons between 1938 and 1949. He is perhaps best known as the starting third baseman on the 1944 Browns, the only St. Louis–based team to win an American League pennant.

== Early life and career ==
Born in the St. Louis suburb of Maplewood, Missouri, he was the elder brother of Paul Christman (1918–1970), who would become a quarterback in the National Football League during the 1940s and, later, one of the most accomplished color commentators on NFL and American Football League telecasts of the 1960s. Mark Christman threw and batted right-handed, stood 5 feet 11 inches (1.80 m) tall and weighed 175 pounds (79 kg) during his baseball career.

After graduating from high school in Maplewood, he failed a tryout for the powerhouse St. Louis Cardinals in 1932, but he continued to play semi-professional baseball and was eventually signed to a contract by the Detroit Tigers in 1934; coincidentally, the Cardinals and Tigers would battle each other in the hard-fought 1934 World Series. He began his pro career in the Tigers' farm system that season and made the 1938 Detroit roster after batting .289 in the Texas League. He started 65 games at third base and another 22 at shortstop during his rookie season. The following May, he was one of six Detroit players shipped to the Browns, St. Louis' downtrodden American League team, for pitcher Bobo Newsom and three others; Newsom would pitch the Tigers to the 1940 AL championship, while Christman batted only .216 for the 1939 Browns and would spend 1940–1942 back in the minor leagues.

== With St. Louis Browns ==
As World War II raged and hundreds of players were called to military service, Christman—although not classified 4–F—was exempt from the draft and was called back to the talent-starved Browns in 1943. After playing most of that season as a utility infielder, he replaced the traded Harlond Clift as the team's regular third baseman in mid-August. In 1944, he started 145 of the Browns' 154 regular-season games at third base. Although he hit only six home runs, his 148 hits and 83 runs batted in were second on the club to slugging shortstop Vern Stephens, as he helped lead the Browns to their only American League pennant, prevailing by one game over the Tigers.

In the 1944 World Series, the Browns faced their tenants at Sportsman's Park, the Cardinals, who had won their third straight National League championship (with 105 in-season victories, 16 more than the Browns) and were gunning for their second World Series triumph in three seasons. The Browns, considered "sentimental favorites," won Games 1 and 3 to forge a two games-to-one lead. But, stymied by the Cardinals' superior pitching, they lost the Series' final three games to deny them what would have been their only world title. (Their post-1953 successor franchise, the Baltimore Orioles, would win their first championship in 1966.) Christman struggled along with the other Browns' hitters; he collected only two singles in 22 at bats (.091), with no bases on balls and six strikeouts; in the field, he made one error in 13 total chances.

Christman played in only 78 games in 1945, the last wartime season, after missing much of the action during April and May. He did hit a career-high .277 and held the regular third-base job in 1946, as MLB players flooded back from military service, hitting .258 in 128 games. But, on the eve of the 1947 season, the 33-year-old veteran was sold to the Washington Senators, where he finished his big-league tenure as the starting third baseman (1947), regular shortstop (1948) and utility infielder (1949). His playing career continued in the minor leagues through 1953, where he was a player-manager. Later, he scouted for the Senators, New York Yankees, Oakland Athletics and Los Angeles Dodgers.

In his nine MLB seasons Christman played in 911 games and had 3,081 at-bats, 294 runs scored, 781 hits, 113 doubles, 23 triples, 19 home runs, 348 RBI, 17 stolen bases, 219 walks, .253 batting average, .306 on-base percentage, .324 slugging percentage, 997 total bases, and 37 sacrifice hits.

He died in St. Louis at the age of 62.
