= Bud Stewart =

American baseball player (1916–2000)

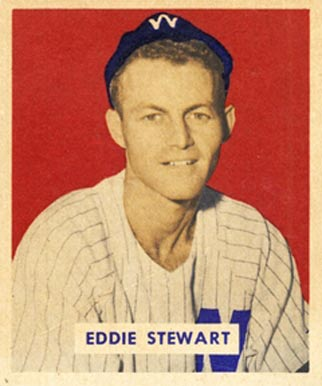
- Outfielder
- Born: June 15, 1916; Sacramento, California, U.S.
- Died: June 21, 2000 (aged 84); Palo Alto, California, U.S.
- Batted: Left Threw: Right

MLB debut
- April 19, 1941, for the Pittsburgh Pirates

Last MLB appearance
- June 2, 1954, for the Chicago White Sox

MLB statistics
- Batting average: .268
- Hits: 547
- Home runs: 32
- Runs batted in: 260
- Stats at Baseball Reference

Teams
- Pittsburgh Pirates (1941–1942); New York Yankees (1948); Washington Senators (1948–1950); Chicago White Sox (1951–1954)

Edward Perry "Bud" Stewart (June 15, 1916 – June 21, 2000) was an American professional baseball player. He had a nine-season (1941–1942; 1948–1954) career in Major League Baseball as an outfielder and pinch hitter for the Pittsburgh Pirates, New York Yankees, Washington Senators and Chicago White Sox. Stewart batted left-handed, threw right-handed, stood 5 feet 11 inches (1.80 m) tall and weighed 160 pounds (73 kg).

Stewart was born in Sacramento, California, and attended UCLA from 1934–1937. In the summer of 1937, he signed with the San Diego Padres of the Pacific Coast League. He was a teammate of Ted Williams on the 1937 Padres, who won the PCL championship. While Williams moved on to a Hall of Fame career in the Majors, Stewart remained with the Padres until October 1, 1940, when he was purchased by the Pirates. He debuted for manager Frankie Frisch's 1941 Pirates on April 19.

A speedy and versatile defensive outfielder, Stewart also led the National League in pinch hits, with ten in 1941. He remained with the Pirates until June 1942, when he enlisted in the United States Army, serving until December 1945. Stewart then spent 1946 with the Hollywood Stars of the PCL until March 1947, when he was traded to the Yankee organization. After spending 1947 with the Kansas City Blues of the American Association, he began the 1948 season with the Yankees as a teammate of Joe DiMaggio. But on May 13, Stewart was traded to the Washington Senators, where he placed second in the American League in triples (13) in 1948. On December 11, 1950, Stewart was traded to the White Sox, and ended his career as a pinch hitter, retiring on June 9, 1954.

In 773 games over nine seasons, Stewart posted a .268 batting average (547 hits in 2041 at-bats) with 288 runs, 32 home runs, 260 RBI and 252 bases on balls. He recorded a .980 fielding percentage playing at all three outfield positions and several games at second and third base.

During and after his playing days, he was a physical education instructor in Hawthorne, California, and appeared as an extra in several Hollywood films. A story, told by Stewart himself, had him facing legendary pitcher Satchel Paige in a 1948 game—and hitting a triple through Paige's legs.

Bud Stewart died in Palo Alto, California, at the age of 84.

== See also ==
- Chicago White Sox all-time roster

== Sources ==
- Career statistics from Baseball Reference · Baseball Reference (Minors) · Retrosheet · Baseball Almanac
