= Eddie Yost =

American baseball player and coach (1926–2012)

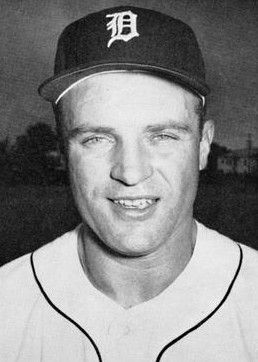
- Yost, circa 1959
- Third baseman
- Born: October 13, 1926; Brooklyn, New York, U.S.
- Died: October 16, 2012 (aged 86); Weston, Massachusetts, U.S.
- Batted: Right Threw: Right

MLB debut
- August 16, 1944, for the Washington Senators

Last MLB appearance
- July 28, 1962, for the Los Angeles Angels

MLB statistics
- Batting average: .254
- Home runs: 139
- Runs batted in: 683
- Stats at Baseball Reference
- Managerial record at Baseball Reference

Teams
- As player: Washington Senators (1944, 1946–1958); Detroit Tigers (1959–1960); Los Angeles Angels (1961–1962); As manager: Washington Senators (1963); As coach: Los Angeles Angels (1962); Washington Senators (1963–1967); New York Mets (1968–1976); Boston Red Sox (1977–1984)

Career highlights and awards
- All-Star (1952); World Series champion (1969)

Edward Frederick Joseph Yost (October 13, 1926 – October 16, 2012) was an American professional baseball player and coach. He played most of his Major League Baseball (MLB) career as a third baseman for the Washington Senators, then played two seasons each with the Detroit Tigers and the Los Angeles Angels before retiring in 1962.

The 5 ft 10 in (1.78 m), 170 lb (77 kg) Yost batted and threw right-handed. He was nicknamed "The Walking Man" for the numerous walks he drew, and he continues to rank 11th all-time among major leaguers in that category, ahead of the likes of Pete Rose, Willie Mays, Stan Musial, and Hank Aaron. Yost was considered one of the best leadoff hitters and defensive third basemen of his era.

== Major League career ==
Yost was born in Brooklyn, New York, where he played baseball and basketball at New York University (NYU) before signing with the Washington Senators as an amateur free agent in 1944. He made his Major League debut with the Senators at the age of 17 on August 16, 1944, having never played in the minor leagues. Yost spent the 1945 season in the United States Navy before returning to the Senators in 1946.

In 1950, Yost posted career highs with a .295 batting average and a .440 on-base percentage. In 1951, he led the American League with 36 doubles and produced a career-high 65 runs batted in. He earned a place as a reserve player for the American League team in the 1952 All-Star Game. Between August 30, 1949, and May 11, 1955, Yost played in 829 consecutive games for the Senators, the ninth-longest consecutive game streak in major league history. Yost's home run totals were limited by Washington's cavernous Griffith Stadium. Between 1944 and 1953, he hit only three home runs at home while hitting 52 home runs on the road.

On December 6, 1958, after 14 seasons with the Senators, Yost was traded to the Detroit Tigers, allowing the Senators to make room for young prospect Harmon Killebrew. Playing in hitter-friendly Tiger Stadium in 1959, his home run production climbed to a career-high of 21 and, he led the American League with 115 runs scored, 135 base on balls and a .435 on-base percentage. In 1960, he again led the league in base on balls and on-base percentage. Yost spent two seasons with the Tigers before being selected by the Los Angeles Angels in the 1961 American League expansion draft.

Yost was the first Angels player to appear in a major league game, leading off in the team's first game, played at Baltimore on April 11, 1961.

== Career statistics ==
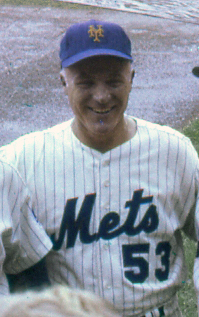
Yost as New York Mets third base coach, 1969.

In an 18-year career, Yost played in 2,109 games, accumulating 1,863 hits in 7,346 at bats for a .254 career batting average along with 139 home runs, 683 runs batted in and an on-base percentage of .394. He ended his career with a .957 fielding percentage. Yost led the American League in walks on six occasions and logged 1,614 over his 18-year career, ranking him 11th on the all-time walks list. In 1956, he had a .412 on-base percentage while posting a .231 batting average, the lowest batting average with a .400 on-base percentage in major league history. Yost hit 28 home runs to lead off a game, a record which stood until Bobby Bonds broke it in the 1970s.

Yost led American League third basemen eight times in putouts, seven times in double plays, three times in assists and twice in fielding percentage. He set American League career records with 2,356 putouts, 3,659 assists, and 6,285 total chances. His 2,356 putouts ranks him third all-time among third basemen behind Brooks Robinson and Jimmy Collins. In 1960, he surpassed Pie Traynor's major league record for most games played as a third baseman with 1,865 games. Yost was the first third baseman in history to appear in more than 2,000 games. Baseball historian Bill James ranked Yost 24th all-time among third baseman in his Historical Baseball Abstract.

Yost attended New York University during the off-season, from which he earned a Master's degree in physical education in 1953.

== Coaching career ==
Yost followed his long playing career with a 23-season career as a coach. After a brief stint as a playing coach with the 1962 Angels, Yost returned to Washington in 1963 as the third-base coach of the second Senators franchise, under his old teammate, manager Mickey Vernon. After Washington began the season by losing 26 of its first 40 games, Vernon was replaced by Gil Hodges. Yost served as interim manager during the brief transition, losing his only game as manager, 9–3 to the Chicago White Sox, on May 22, 1963. Yost then continued on Hodges' Washington staff through 1967.

When Hodges became manager of the New York Mets in 1968, he took Yost with him; Shea Stadium, the Mets' home field, was located only eight miles (13 km) from Yost's off-season home in South Ozone Park, Queens. Yost was the Mets' third-base coach from 1968 to 1976, and was a member of both the 1969 "Miracle Mets" World Series champion and the 1973 Mets, who won the National League pennant but fell in that season's Fall Classic in seven games.

In 1977, he continued his coaching career with the Boston Red Sox, coaching at third base for eight more seasons, through 1984, under skippers Don Zimmer and Ralph Houk. By his retirement at the close of the 1984 campaign, Yost had spent 40 years in uniform in professional baseball, all of them at the major-league level.

== Personal life and family ==
While playing for the Detroit Tigers, Yost married Patricia Healy, who worked for their front office in public relations. They had two daughters, Felita Yost Carr and Alexis; a son, Mike; and two grandsons, Edward and Joseph. Patricia died on January 6, 2007.

Yost's daughter Felita competed in ice dancing during the 1997 U.S. Figure Skating Championships. Following her active career in ice skating, she is now a coach of figure skating.

Eddie's son, Michael is current Boston College indoor pole vault record holder.

His grandson Edward played varsity baseball at Huntington Beach High School in California and is a lefthand pitcher. Edward was a member of the 2015 HBHS varsity baseball team which won the California Interscholastic Federation – Southern Section Division 1 Championship on June 6, 2015. Edward Yost played for Pepperdine University through 2019 as part of the Pepperdine Waves baseball team.

Yost and his family had moved to Boston's western suburbs during his tenure with the Red Sox and he lived there in retirement. He died of cardiovascular disease in Weston, Massachusetts, on October 16, 2012, aged 86.

== See also ==
- List of Major League Baseball career runs scored leaders
- List of Major League Baseball annual runs scored leaders
- List of Major League Baseball annual doubles leaders
- List of baseball players who went directly to Major League Baseball
- Major League Baseball consecutive games played streaks

Managing/coaching
Preceded by George Case	Washington Senators third-base coach 1963–1967	Succeeded by Bobby Hofman
Preceded by Salty Parker	New York Mets third-base coach 1968–1976	Succeeded by Tom Burgess
Preceded by Eddie Popowski	Boston Red Sox third-base coach 1977–1984	Succeeded by Rene Lachemann
