= Gil Coan =

American baseball player (1922–2020)

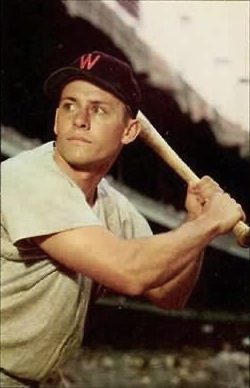
- Coan with the Washington Senators in 1953
- Left fielder
- Born: May 18, 1922; Monroe, North Carolina, U.S.
- Died: February 4, 2020 (aged 97); Hendersonville, North Carolina, U.S.
- Batted: Left Threw: Right

MLB debut
- April 27, 1946, for the Washington Senators

Last MLB appearance
- April 25, 1956, for the New York Giants

MLB statistics
- Batting average: .254
- Home runs: 39
- Runs batted in: 278
- Stats at Baseball Reference

Teams
- Washington Senators (1946–1953); Baltimore Orioles (1954–1955); Chicago White Sox (1955); New York Giants (1955–1956)

Gilbert Fitzgerald Coan (May 18, 1922 – February 4, 2020) was an American professional baseball outfielder who played in Major League Baseball (MLB) for the Washington Senators, Baltimore Orioles, Chicago White Sox and New York Giants. Listed at 6 ft 0 in (1.83 m), 180 lb (82 kg), he batted left-handed and threw right-handed. At his death he was the oldest living former New York Giants player.

== Early life ==
At the age of 10, Coan had an infection in his left hand which resulted in a partial amputation of his thumb. He found the prosthesis doctors gave him hindered his playing ability, so he decided not to use any adaptive equipment. Coan said the missing thumb did not affect his hitting but interfered with throwing. Coan graduated from Brevard College in 1942.

== Career ==
In 1945, Coan was honored with The Sporting News Minor League Player of the Year Award while playing for the Chattanooga Lookouts of the Southern Association. He entered the majors in 1946 with the Washington Senators, playing eight seasons for them before joining the Baltimore Orioles (1954–55), Chicago White Sox (1955) and New York Giants (1955–56). A line-drive hitter and speedy outfielder, he averaged 12 stolen bases from 1948–52, with a career-high 23 in 1948 (second in American League).

In 1947, Coan made 21 hits in 42 at bats for a .500 batting average to collect the highest average for any player who had 30 or more at-bats in a major league season, setting a record that was surpassed by Rudy Pemberton in 1996 with a .512 BA (21-for-41). His most productive season came in 1951, when he posted career highs in home runs (9), runs batted in (62), runs (85) and games played (135) while hitting .303 (ninth in AL), equaling a personal mark set the year before. Coan also tied a major league record he shares with four other players by hitting two triples in the same inning on April 21, 1951.

Over eleven seasons, Coan was a .254 hitter (731-for-2877) with 39 home runs and 278 RBI in 918 games, including 384 runs, 98 doubles, 44 triples, 83 stolen bases, and a .316 on-base percentage. Defensively, he recorded a .973 fielding percentage playing at all three outfield positions.

== Later life ==
Following his career, Coan entered the insurance business. From 1962, the Brevard Insurance Agency was owned and operated by Coan in Brevard, North Carolina, and after his retirement in 1986, his son and grandson continued to run the agency.

Coan died on February 4, 2020, in Hendersonville, North Carolina. He was 97 years old.
