= George Myatt =

American baseball player, coach, and manager (1914-2000)

- Infielder
- Born: June 14, 1914; Denver, Colorado, U.S.
- Died: September 14, 2000 (aged 86); Orlando, Florida, U.S.
- Batted: Left Threw: Right

MLB debut
- August 16, 1938, for the New York Giants

Last MLB appearance
- May 19, 1947, for the Washington Senators

MLB statistics
- Batting average: .283
- Home runs: 4
- Runs batted in: 99
- Stats at Baseball Reference
- Managerial record at Baseball Reference

Teams
- As player: New York Giants (1938–1939); Washington Senators (1943–1947); As manager: Philadelphia Phillies (1968, 1969); As coach: Washington Senators (1950–1954); Chicago White Sox (1955–1956); Chicago Cubs (1957–1959); Milwaukee Braves (1960–1961); Detroit Tigers (1962–1963); Philadelphia Phillies (1964–1972)

George Edward Myatt (June 14, 1914 – September 14, 2000) was an American Major and Minor League Baseball player, coach, and manager. An infielder, Myatt came by three nicknames: Foghorn, for his loud voice; Mercury, for his speed on the bases; and Stud, a name he applied to almost every other player, coach and manager he encountered in baseball.

Myatt was a native of Denver, Colorado, who grew up in El Segundo, California, where he graduated from high school.

== Playing career ==
Myatt batted left-handed, threw right-handed, and was listed as 5 feet 11 inches (1.80 m) tall and 165 pounds (75 kg). He entered professional baseball in 1933. In 1936, Boston Red Sox general manager Eddie Collins traveled to San Diego to scout Myatt in a Pacific Coast League game, but came away more impressed with his 17-year-old teammate, a native San Diegan and a recent Hoover High School graduate. So Collins passed on Myatt and acquired Ted Williams, who became perhaps the greatest modern hitter and was elected to the Baseball Hall of Fame.

Myatt, however, had a long career in the game himself. Primarily a second baseman, he played in the Major Leagues for the New York Giants (1938–39) and the Washington Senators (1943–47), compiling a .283 batting average with 381 hits in 407 games played. He stole 26 bases in 1944 (third in the American League) and 30 more (second in the AL) in 1945.

On May 1, 1944, Myatt went 6-for-6 for the Senators in a 11–4 victory against the Red Sox at Fenway Park.

== Coach and acting manager ==
Myatt managed in the minor leagues before becoming a Major League coach for over 20 years with the Senators (1950–54), Chicago White Sox (1955–56), Chicago Cubs (1957–59), Milwaukee Braves (1960–61), Detroit Tigers (1962–63) and Philadelphia Phillies (1964–72). He twice served as interim manager of the Phils, in both 1968 (for one game) and 1969 (for the final third of the season). His career managerial record: 20 wins, 35 defeats (.364).

Myatt died at age 86 in Orlando, Florida.

== See also ==
- List of Major League Baseball single-game hits leaders
