= Milo Candini =

American baseball player (1917–1998)

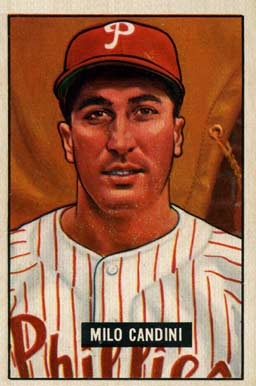
- Pitcher
- Born: August 3, 1917; Manteca, California, U.S.
- Died: March 17, 1998 (aged 80); Manteca, California, U.S.
- Batted: Right Threw: Right

MLB debut
- May 1, 1943, for the Washington Senators

Last MLB appearance
- August 15, 1951, for the Philadelphia Phillies

MLB statistics
- Win–loss record: 26–21
- Earned run average: 3.92
- Strikeouts: 183
- Stats at Baseball Reference

Teams
- Washington Senators (1943–1944, 1946–1949); Philadelphia Phillies (1950–1951)

Mario Cain "Milo" Candini (August 3, 1917 – March 17, 1998) was an American professional baseball pitcher. A 6 ft (1.83 m), 187 lb (85 kg) right-hander, he played all or part of eight seasons in Major League Baseball (MLB) for the Washington Senators (1943–44; 1946–49) and Philadelphia Phillies (1950–51). After Candini's big league career, he continued to pitch in the Pacific Coast League until 1957, primarily for the Sacramento Solons. All told, Candini's professional career lasted 20 seasons.

== Early life ==
Candini was born in Manteca, California, and he played football, baseball and basketball at Manteca High School. He was the school's star pitcher as a junior and senior. His professional career began in the New York Yankees' farm system, but he never appeared for the Yankees. Instead, he was traded to Washington in January 1943 and made the Senators' opening day roster.

== Career ==
After four standout appearances as a relief pitcher, allowing no runs and five hits in 101/3 innings pitched, he received his first starting assignment June 2 against the Cleveland Indians. He threw a complete game, 13–1 victory, allowing eight hits. He also went two-for-five at the plate to help his own cause. He then won his next four starts, including an 8–0 shutout of the Yankees June 23 in The Bronx. In that game, Candini allowed six hits, all singles, and again helped himself at the plate, going two for two with a home run, a double, and two sacrifice bunts. At that point in the season, he had a 7–0 win–loss record (including two wins in relief during May), and a brilliant 0.50 earned run average (ERA) in 541/3 innings pitched. He continued to pitch effectively until the end of July, and then came back to the pack with some poor outings mixed in with four more complete games during August and September. His rookie 1943 season, which would be his finest in the Majors, ended with an 11–7 record, a 2.49 earned run average (sixth in the American League), eight complete games and three shutouts.

Candini pitched less effectively for Washington in 1944, then served in the United States Army in 1945 in the Pacific Theater of World War II. He did not return to baseball until August 25, 1946. In his return, he threw four shutout innings of relief against the St. Louis Browns, and received credit for the 12-inning 5–4 win. His 1947 and 1948 campaigns were less successful; he went 5–7 in 73 games pitched with a composite 5.16 ERA.

Candini spent most of 1949 in Triple-A, where he won 15 games for the Oakland Oaks, then was selected by the Phillies in the 1949 Rule 5 draft. He got into 18 games, all in relief, for the 1950 Phillies and won his only decision, July 26 against the Chicago Cubs, but his lone win contributed to the "Whiz Kids"' narrow triumph in the National League (NL) pennant race that season. Candini did not appear in the 1950 World Series, won by the Yankees in four straight games. He again pitched out of the Phillie bullpen in 1951, working in 15 games in his final MLB season. As a major leaguer, he won 26 of 47 decisions, and allowed 530 hits and 250 bases on balls in 5372/3 innings pitched, with 183 strikeouts. In 174 games pitched, including 37 starts, he registered 13 complete games, five shutouts and eight saves. As a batter, he hit .243, with 35 hits, six doubles, one home run, and eight runs batted in (RBI), in 144 at bats.

In the minor leagues, Candini won 133 games and his standout career as a relief pitcher was capped by his final season, with the 1957 Sacramento Solons, when he won nine games and compiled a low 1.98 ERA in 57 games pitched. He died in his birthplace of Manteca, California, at age 80 in 1998.
