= Dick Weik =

American baseball player (1927–1991)

- Pitcher
- Born: November 17, 1927; Waterloo, Iowa, U.S.
- Died: April 21, 1991 (aged 63); Harvey, Illinois, U.S.
- Batted: Right Threw: Right

MLB debut
- September 8, 1947, for the Washington Senators

Last MLB appearance
- July 5, 1954, for the Detroit Tigers

MLB statistics
- Win–loss record: 6–22
- Earned run average: 5.90
- Strikeouts: 123
- Stats at Baseball Reference

Teams
- Washington Senators (1948–1950); Cleveland Indians (1950); Detroit Tigers (1953–1954)

Richard Henry Weik (November 17, 1927 – April 21, 1991) was an American Major League Baseball pitcher. A 6 ft 3 in (1.91 m), 184 lb (83 kg) right-hander, he played for the Washington Senators (1948–1950), Cleveland Indians (1950), and Detroit Tigers (1953–1954).

Weik was hindered by problems with control. He issued 237 bases on balls in 213 2/3 innings pitched and surrendered 203 hits during his Major League career for a WHIP of 2.059. He appeared in 76 games played, 26 as a starting pitcher.

In 1960, Weik attended the Al Somers Umpire School.
