= Mickey Vernon =

American baseball player and manager (1918–2008)

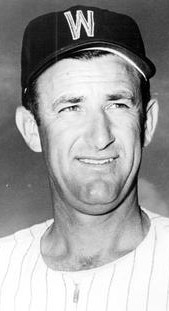
- Vernon in 1961
- First baseman / Manager
- Born: April 22, 1918; Marcus Hook, Pennsylvania, U.S.
- Died: September 24, 2008 (aged 90); Media, Pennsylvania, U.S.
- Batted: Left Threw: Left

MLB debut
- July 8, 1939, for the Washington Senators

Last MLB appearance
- September 27, 1960, for the Pittsburgh Pirates

MLB statistics
- Batting average: .286
- Hits: 2,495
- Home runs: 172
- Runs batted in: 1,311
- Managerial record: 135–227
- Winning %: .373
- Stats at Baseball Reference
- Managerial record at Baseball Reference

Teams
- As player: Washington Senators (1939–1943, 1946–1948); Cleveland Indians (1949–1950); Washington Senators (1950–1955); Boston Red Sox (1956–1957); Cleveland Indians (1958); Milwaukee Braves (1959); Pittsburgh Pirates (1960); As manager: Washington Senators (1961–1963)

Career highlights and awards
- 7× All-Star (1946, 1948, 1953–1956, 1958); World Series champion (1960); 2× AL batting champion (1946, 1953)

James Barton "Mickey" Vernon (April 22, 1918 – September 24, 2008) was an American Major League Baseball (MLB) first baseman who played for the Washington Senators (1939–1948, 1950–1955), Cleveland Indians (1949–1950, 1958), Boston Red Sox (1956–1957), Milwaukee Braves (1959), and Pittsburgh Pirates (1960). He also was the first manager in the history of the expansion edition of the Senators (now the Texas Rangers), serving from 1961 through May 21, 1963, and was a coach for four MLB teams between 1960 and 1982.

Vernon retired as a player in 1960 with 2,495 hits and holds the MLB record for career double plays at first base (2,044). He has the American League (AL) record for first basemen for career games (2,227), putouts (19,754), assists (1,444), and total chances (21,408). The lanky Vernon was listed as 6 feet 2 inches (1.88 m) tall and 170 pounds (77 kg); he batted and threw left-handed.

== Early life ==
Mickey Vernon was born on April 22, 1918, in Marcus Hook, Pennsylvania, located in Delaware County. Vernon's grandfather, Samuel Vernon, was an American Civil War veteran who became the first mayor of Marcus Hook in 1893. His father, Clarence Vernon, worked for the Sun Oil Company refinery and played semiprofessional baseball for the company team. Vernon played sandlot baseball and played on a championship American Legion Baseball team as a teenager, and he played with older men on Sun Oil's industrial league team. Vernon and his future wife Anne Elizabeth "Lib" Firth attended Eddystone High School. Vernon was a basketball star at Eddystone, which did not have a baseball team. Lib also was a stellar athlete in high school; both of them graduated in 1936. Growing up in Marcus Hook, an aunt started calling him Mickey and the nickname stuck.

He attended Villanova University for one year on a baseball scholarship, where he played baseball under coach George "Doc" Jacobs. Washington Senators scout Joe Cambria had observed him at Villanova. Since he was 13 years old, Vernon had been close friends with fellow Delaware County native and childhood baseball teammate, and future MLB player and manager, Danny Murtaugh. In 1937, Vernon and Murtaugh went to try out for professional baseball teams in the Class D Eastern Shore League; Vernon made the Easton, Maryland Browns and Murtaugh made the Cambridge, Maryland Cardinals teams. Also, Doc Jacobs reportedly was the manager and part owner of the Easton Browns, and Jacobs signed Vernon to go to play for the Browns in 1937.

== Professional career and military service ==
=== Minor leagues ===
Vernon played for three Minor League Baseball teams before making his MLB debut on July 8, 1939; and then spent one more minor-league season before permanently becoming an MLB player.

In 1937, he played for Jacobs and the Easton Browns, which were affiliated with the American League's St. Louis Browns. Vernon played in 83 games for the Browns, with a .287 batting average, 10 home runs, and 64 runs batted in (RBIs) in just 300 at bats.

Vernon was signed by the original Washington Senators as an amateur free agent in 1937. In 1938, he played for the Greenville Spinners of the Class B South Atlantic (Sally) League. He played first base and batted .328, with 84 runs scored, 72 RBIs, 31 doubles, 12 triples, an .820 [on-base plus slugging]], and only one home run. He was sixth in the Sally League in batting average among players with over 500 at bats. In 1939, he played in 69 games for the Single-A Springfield Nationals, the Senators' affiliate in the Eastern League, before being called up to the Senators in early July. He was hitting a league-leading .343 at the time he was promoted to the MLB.

After playing a portion of the 1939 season with the Senators, Vernon spent most of 1940 playing for the Double-A Jersey City Giants of the International League. He hit .283 in 569 at bats, with 9 home runs. This was his last season in the minors.

=== Major leagues ===
Vernon played for 14 full MLB seasons (400 at bats or more) in his 20-year career. He wound up batting over .335 twice, over .300 five times, and over .290 nine times. He was a two-time AL batting champion. In 1946, his .353 batting mark eclipsed Ted Williams' .342 by 11 points (both of whom were returning from military service after World War II). Then, in 1953, Vernon's .337 average denied Cleveland's Al Rosen (.336) the Triple Crown by just one one-thousandth of a point. The following year, 1954, Vernon had a career-high 20 home runs, 97 RBIs, and 14 triples. He led the AL with 33 doubles and 67 extra-base hits. He also had 294 total bases, which was second in the AL, behind Minnie Miñoso.

=== Washington Senators (1939–1943) ===
Vernon played in 76 games for the 1939 Senators, starting 75 at first base. He hit .257 in 276 at bats, with one home run, 30 RBIs, and 23 runs scored. He played in only five games for the Senators in 1940, spending most of the season with the Jersey City Giants. In 1941, he rejoined the Senators as their starting first baseman. He hit .299 in 138 games, with nine home runs, 93 RBIs, 73 runs scored and a .794 OPS. He had a .992 fielding percentage at first base, fourth-best in the AL, and led all AL first basemen with 122 double plays turned. He started 151 and 145 games in 1942 and 1943, batting .271 and .268, respectively. He had the worst fielding percentage of his career in 1942 (.982), leading all Major League first basemen in errors (26); but improved to .990 the following season, fifth best in the American League. On August 18, 1943, he was involved in turning 10 double plays.

=== Military service ===
During World War II, he served in the United States Navy, missing the 1944 and 1945 seasons. After basic training, he played baseball on a variety of service teams. He served with MLB players Larry Doby and Billy Goodman on Ulithi in the South Pacific in 1945, where they pitched batting practice to each other. While on Ulithi, they learned the Brooklyn Dodgers had signed Jackie Robinson, who would become the first African American player in MLB. Vernon told Doby that he could play in the major leagues and would get his chance. Both Goodman and Vernon personally inspired and encouraged Doby to believe he could actually become a major league baseball player, telling him Robinson’s signing meant Doby would have a good chance to join MLB, as well; Vernon said the Senators were interested in Doby. In 1947, Doby became the first African-American to break the baseball color line in the AL with the Cleveland Indians, just 11 weeks after Jackie Robinson did so in the National League. While still playing in Negro League baseball in 1946, Vernon had presented his friend Doby with a dozen baseball bats, purchased by the Washington Senators. Vernon, Goodman and Doby would play together on the American League All-Star team in 1953.

=== Washington Senators and Cleveland Indians (1946–55) ===
After a two-year absence, Vernon returned to the Senators for the 1946 season and had a career-high and league-leading .353 batting average. He led all MLB players in doubles with 51. He also had eight home runs, 85 RBIs, 88 runs scored, and a .910 OPS, with a .990 fielding percentage at first base. He was selected to the American League All-Star team for the first time, as the starting first baseman. He was fifth in the 1946 AL Most Valuable Player voting. Ted Williams passed Vernon twice during the season as league leader in batting average, but Williams ended the season at .342 to Vernon's .353. After the 1946 season, Vernon toured with Bob Feller's All-Stars. During that tour, his team frequently faced Satchel Paige.

Vernon, who had never hit over .300 in an MLB season, was hitting over .400 in late May 1946, and had a 22-game hitting streak that ended on May 28. Senators coach Clyde Milan had worked regularly with Vernon on improving his focus and batting approach early in the season. Vernon had been a pull hitter during his earlier years, but in 1946, decided to hit the ball to all fields based on where he was pitched, a key to improving his average. Though he learned from Milan, who was primarily the team's third-base coach, Vernon believed that players essentially served as their own batting coaches at the time, as the position did not exist in his day. He found value in studying teammate Cecil Travis, who was proficient at hitting to all fields based on where the ball was pitched, as well as his idol, Hall of Fame second baseman Charlie Gehringer, who had the same skill. He also studied Ted Williams, Joe DiMaggio, and Hank Greenberg, for individual traits he might learn from them, even if he was a different kind of hitter.

Before the 1947 season, Vernon sought a $25,000 salary from the Senators. Owner Clark Griffith called the demand ridiculous and offered a $9,000 salary, plus an unspecified bonus. Vernon's batting average fell to .265 in 1947 and then .242 in 1948. He still had 85 RBIs in 1947, but only 48 in 1948. Despite a career-low batting average, he was selected to the AL All-Star team in 1948. In December 1948, Vernon and Early Wynn were sent to the Cleveland Indians in exchange for Joe Haynes, Ed Klieman, and Eddie Robinson. After the trade, New York Yankees' manager Casey Stengel said, "'I went to bed with a pennant winner and woke up in second place'".

In 1949, Vernon rebounded in Cleveland. He hit .291, with a then-career-high 18 home runs, along with 83 RBIs, 72 runs scored, and an .801 OPS. He was recovering from an offseason appendectomy when he began spring training that season. Despite Stengel's concerns, the Yankees finished in first place (97–57) and Cleveland finished third (89–65). The Senators finished in last place (50–104). In mid-June 1950, Cleveland traded Vernon back to the Senators for Dick Weik. Vernon had played in 28 games for Cleveland, hitting only .189 at the time of the trade. He had become more of a bench player with the improvement of first baseman Luke Easter. Weik was a 22-year old pitcher. Vernon played 90 games for Washington in 1950, batting .306 in 327 at bats, with nine home runs and 65 RBIs and an .863 OPS. Weik finished out the year in Cleveland, pitching in only 11 games. He was inducted into the military in November 1950, and did not play again until 1953 with the Detroit Tigers (where his career ended after the 1954 season). Easter hit .280 with 28 home runs and 107 RBIs.

Vernon remained with the Senators from 1951 to 1955. He arguably had the best year of his MLB career in 1953. He led the AL with a .337 batting average, and in doubles with 43. He had 15 home runs, 11 triples, and career bests with 115 RBIs, 101 runs scored, and a .921 OPS. In 1954, he hit .290, and led the AL in doubles (33), with career bests of 14 triples and 20 home runs. He also had 97 RBIs and an .850 OPS. He was selected to the American League All-Star team from 1953 to 1955, starting in 1953 and 1955. He was third in AL MVP voting in 1953, ninth in 1954, and 23rd in 1955. He never had fewer than 80 RBIs in a season during this span. In his final season with the Senators, he hit .301 with 14 home runs and 85 RBIs.

During 1951 to 1955, Vernon also led all AL third basemen in fielding percentage in 1951 (.994), 1952 (.993) and 1954 (.992). He had a .992 fielding percentage in 1953 (fourth-best in the MLB), while leading all MLB first basemen with 158 double plays turned.

=== Later years (1956–1960) ===
In November 1955, the Senators traded the 37-year old Vernon, Bob Porterfield, Johnny Schmitz, and Tom Umphlett to the Boston Red Sox for Karl Olson, Dick Brodowski, Tex Clevenger, Neil Chrisley, and Al Curtis. Vernon was surprised to be traded, but looked forward to playing for a winning team. The Senators had only two winning seasons during all of his years with the team, and the 1949 Indians had the best record of any team for which he had played.

In 1956 with the Red Sox, 38-year old Vernon hit .310 in 403 at bats, with 15 home runs, 84 RBI, 67 runs scored, and a .914 OPS. He was selected to the AL All-Star team for the sixth time, and was 21st in AL Most Valuable Player voting. The Red Sox finished the season 84–70. He played one more season in Boston, hitting .241 in only 270 at bats, while splitting time at first base with Dick Gernert. He had been among the top 10 hitters at mid-season, but tailed off as the season progressed.

In November, the Red Sox and Cleveland worked out a deal where Cleveland paid Boston and then acquired Vernon's rights via claiming him after Boston waived Vernon. The Senators had shown some interest in acquiring Vernon with the long-term plan of grooming him for the team's manager position. In 1958, the 40-year old Vernon started 87 games at first base for Cleveland, batting .293 in 355 at bats, with eight home runs, 55 RBIs, and an .812 OPS. He was selected to the AL All-Star team for the seventh and final time. He had a pinch hit in the fifth inning of the 1958 All-Star game, held at Memorial Stadium in Baltimore, and scored the game-tying run.

On April 11, 1959, Cleveland traded Vernon to the Milwaukee Braves for Humberto Robinson. Vernon hit .220 in 91 at bats for the Braves, which released him after the season ended.

In November 1959, Vernon's old friend Danny Murtaugh, with whom he had started on the road to professional baseball 22 years earlier, was managing the Pittsburgh Pirates. Murtaugh hired Vernon to become the Pirates' first base coach for the 1960 season. On September 1, 1960, after a season spent at that position, Vernon was signed as a player and placed on the active list when MLB rosters expanded to 40 men. The Pirates needed another left-handed pinch hitter, and Vernon had kept up taking batting practice during the year. He appeared in nine regular-season games as a pinch hitter for Pittsburgh, notching an RBI single and an intentional walk in his nine plate appearances. He was released by the Pirates as a player on September 30, 1960. In October, the Pirates went on to win the 1960 World Series, with Vernon as the team's first base coach only. Though not eligible to play in the World Series, he did win a World Series ring.

== Coaching and managing ==
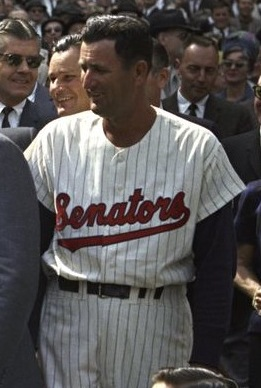
Vernon in 1963 as manager of the expansion Washington Senators

Vernon's career as a coach and manager began during his 1960 stint on the staff of his longtime friend, Pirates' skipper Danny Murtaugh.

The following year, in 1961, he returned to Washington, DC, when he was named manager of the expansion Senators in their first year of existence. Inheriting the name and home field of the 1901–1960 Washington franchise, now the Minnesota Twins, the expansion Senators were hastily constructed with an undercapitalized ownership, an MLB roster of castoff players, and an almost-nonexistent farm system. In Vernon's two full seasons at the helm, 1961 and 1962, the Senators lost a combined 201 games. They were 14–26 and last in the ten-team American League when Vernon was fired on May 21, 1963, and replaced by former Brooklyn Dodgers first baseman, and future Hall of Famer, Gil Hodges. He finished with a career record of 135–227, a .373 winning percentage.

Murtaugh rehired Vernon as the Pirates' first base coach in 1964. Murtaugh resigned for health reasons at the end of the 1964 season, and Vernon left the Pirates. He became the St. Louis Cardinals' first base coach in 1965. From 1966 to 1968, he managed the Vancouver Mounties of the Triple-A Pacific Coast League, a Kansas City/Oakland Athletics affiliate; going 77–71 in 1966, 77–69 in 1967, and 58–88 in 1968. From 1969 to 1970, he managed the Triple-A Richmond Braves, the Atlanta Braves affiliate in the International League, taking the team from a 56–83 record in 1969 to 73–67 the following season. In 1971, he became manager of the New York Yankees' Double-A affiliate, the Manchester Yankees, going 61–75.

He worked as a minor league batting instructor for the Kansas City Royals from 1973 to 1974 and the Los Angeles Dodgers from 1975 to 1976. He was a batting coach with the Montreal Expos in 1977 and 1978. He moved to the Yankees' organization in September 1978 as a special batting instructor.

In early 1982, at age 63, Vernon was briefly named the Yankees' batting coach, after Charlie Lau left the team, allegedly no longer wanting to work under George Steinbrenner. By contrast, Vernon was low profile and brought an "energetic gentleness" to his approach on hitting. He considered his value as a hitting coach to be his ability to observe a player's flaws and then work with the player to understand the flaw's existence and the process of overcoming it. In 1983, he was assigned as the batting coach of the Columbus Clippers, a Yankees Triple-A affiliate, and was still coaching there in 1985. In early 1984, the Yankees brought him in to work with Roy Smalley on learning how to field at first base.

Vernon later scouted for the Yankees; he retired in 1988 at age 70.

== Legacy and honors ==
Vernon appeared in 2,409 MLB games without playing in the postseason, third-most in history behind Ernie Banks and Luke Appling. Vernon ended his career with 2,237 games played at first base, behind only Eddie Murray (2,413), Jake Beckley (2,377), and Fred McGriff (2,239) in MLB history. His 2,044 double plays turned at first base is first all-time (through 2025). He led the AL in fielding percentage four times and the majors twice. His .9902 fielding percentage is tied for 200th all-time among first basemen (through 2025). He holds the American League records for most putouts by a first baseman (19,754), assists by a first baseman (1,444) and total chances (21,198).

Vernon posted a career .286 batting average with 172 home runs and 1,311 RBIs in 2,409 games. The left-hander averaged 88 RBIs a year and had 11 seasons with 80 or more and three with 90 or more. He scored 1,196 runs with 137 stolen bases and a .359 on-base percentage. His career slugging percentage was .428, with a career high of .518 in 1953. He compiled 2,495 hits, with 490 doubles and 120 triples in 8,731 at bats. He had 3,741 career total bases, with his career high coming in 1953 (315).

Satchel Paige once said, "If I had a two-run lead, the bases were loaded in the ninth inning, and Mickey Vernon was up...I'd walk him and pitch to the next hitter." Ned Garver recalled that in Vernon's finest seasons, "He'd hit the ball wherever it was pitched. He was difficult to pitch to in those seasons".

Vernon is one of only 31 players in baseball history to have appeared in an MLB game in four decades (including two players who played in the Negro leagues). By his final game played, on September 27, 1960, he was, at 42, the oldest player in the National League by almost a year, and one of the most popular figures in the game. The second-oldest player in the Major Leagues was Ted Williams, Vernon's Red Sox teammate and another four-decade player. Like Vernon, Williams played in MLB between 1939 and 1960, but was four months younger than Vernon.

Over time, Vernon became one of the best-liked ballplayers of his time, mainly through his unique personality and charismatic, but quiet, style. Gene Woodling said of Vernon, "He was a first-class guy all the way". He was called the "Gentleman First Baseman", described as "polite, kindly, and graceful" as a player and off the field, and was President Dwight David Eisenhower's favorite baseball player. Eisenhower presented Vernon with the Silver Slugger Award for having the AL's highest batting average in 1953. The plaque on a statute dedicated to him in Marcus Hook calls Vernon a "role model", "mentor", "great guy", and "a gentleman's gentleman".

Harry Kalas, winner of the National Baseball Hall of Fame's 2002 Ford C. Frick Award for his years as a play-by-play commentator for the Philadelphia Phillies, said his love of baseball started because of Vernon. Kalas grew up near Chicago and attended his first MLB game in Chicago at 10 years old, with the White Sox playing the Senators. The stands were sparsely crowded because of rain, and his father and he were seated near the Senators dugout. Vernon saw Kalas before the game started, went into the stands and picked him up, and brought him into the dugout, introducing him to Senators' players. After 10 minutes, Vernon put Kalas back in his seat. Kalas was ecstatic, Vernon became his favorite player, and he even remained a Senators fan until the team moved to Minnesota.

In August 2008, Vernon was named as one of the 10 former players who began their careers before 1943 to be considered by the Veterans Committee for induction into the National Baseball Hall of Fame in 2009. Pennsylvania's General Assembly adopted a resolution on November 12, 2008 "Urging the National Baseball Hall of Fame to induct James Barton "Mickey" Vernon". He needed nine votes to be selected by the 12-man committee, but only received five.

The Mickey Vernon Museum Collection in Radnor, Pennsylvania, honors Vernon's career, military service, and friendship with Murtaugh, among other artifacts. In September 2003, Marcus Hook dedicated a life-size statue of Vernon on a baseball field one block from his former home. A youth Little League in Delaware County, Pennsylvania was first named for Vernon during his Major League career, and continued thereafter. Vernon would attend its opening game every year. He is a member of the Delaware County Chapter of the Pennsylvania Sports Hall of Fame.

== Personal life ==
Mickey and Lib (Firth) Vernon were married for 63 years at the time of her death in 2004. While they met in high school, Vernon was too shy to ask her for a date until they were 19. Their daughter Gay Vernon was a Boston radio newscaster.

== Death ==
Vernon died from a stroke at age 90, on September 24, 2008, at Riddle Hospital in Media, Pennsylvania, after living in nearby Wallingford, Pennsylvania, for many years. Vernon is interred at the Lawn Croft Cemetery in Linwood, Pennsylvania.

== MLB highlights ==
- MLB record: Double plays at first base (2,044)
- American League All-Star (1946, 1948, 1953–1956, 1958)
- American League batting champion (1946, 1953)
- American League leader in doubles (1946, 1953, 1954)
- American League leader in extra base hits (1954)
- American League leader in fielding average (1950-1952, 1954)
- American League top 10 in MVP voting (1946, 1953, 1954)
- American League top 10 in triples (1941, 1943, 1946, 1947, 1951–1955)

== See also ==
- Baseball Hall of Fame balloting, 2009
- List of Major League Baseball career hits leaders
- List of Major League Baseball career doubles leaders
- List of Major League Baseball career triples leaders
- List of Major League Baseball career runs scored leaders
- List of Major League Baseball career runs batted in leaders
- List of Major League Baseball batting champions
- List of Major League Baseball annual doubles leaders
- List of Major League Baseball players who played in four decades
- List of Major League Baseball players to hit for the cycle
- List of St. Louis Cardinals coaches

Achievements
Preceded by Bill Salkeld	Hitting for the cycle May 19, 1946	Succeeded by Ted Williams
Sporting positions
Preceded by George Detore; Ron Northey	Pittsburgh Pirates first-base coach 1960; 1964	Succeeded by Ron Northey; Johnny Pesky
Preceded by Joe Schultz	St. Louis Cardinals first-base coach 1965	Succeeded by Dick Sisler
