= Joe Fitzgerald (baseball) =

American baseball player, coach, and scout

- Coach
- Born: March 17, 1897; Washington, D.C.
- Died: August 29, 1967 (aged 70); Orlando, Florida
- Batted: Right Threw: Right

Teams
- Washington Senators (1944–1957)

Joseph Patrick Fitzgerald (March 17, 1897 – August 29, 1967) was an American catcher, coach, and scout in professional baseball. Born in Washington, D.C., on St. Patrick's Day 1897, Fitzgerald stood 5 ft 11 in (1.80 m) tall, weighed 200 pounds (91 kg), and threw and batted right-handed.

Fitzgerald played nine seasons of minor league baseball (1919–27) at the Class C and D levels – spending the bulk of his career with the Waynesboro Villagers of the Blue Ridge League. He was out of pro baseball for the next 16 years, until he was hired as the bullpen coach by his hometown Washington Senators of Major League Baseball in 1944. He stayed in that role through the 1957 campaign. Fitzgerald remained with Washington and its successor franchise, the Minnesota Twins, as a scout until his death at age 70 in Orlando, Florida.
