= Dick Welteroth =

American baseball player (1927–2014)

- Pitcher
- Born: August 3, 1927; Williamsport, Pennsylvania, U.S.
- Died: May 7, 2014 (aged 86); Williamsport, Pennsylvania, U.S.
- Batted: Right Threw: Right

MLB debut
- May 16, 1948, for the Washington Senators

Last MLB appearance
- June 15, 1950, for the Washington Senators

MLB statistics
- Earned run average: 6.48
- Won–lost record: 4–6
- Strikeouts: 55
- Stats at Baseball Reference

Teams
- Washington Senators (1948–1950)

Richard John Welteroth (August 3, 1927 – May 7, 2014) was an American right-handed Major League Baseball relief pitcher who played from 1948 to 1950 for the Washington Senators.

Prior to playing professionally, he attended St. Mary's High School in Williamsport.

He made his big league debut on May 16, 1948, at the age of 20. That season, he appeared in 33 games with the Senators (31 of which were relief appearances), going 2–1 with a 5.51 ERA. In 65 1/3 innings, he struck out only 16 batters while walking 50. He also allowed 73 hits and six home runs.

In 1949, he 50 relief appearances and two starts for a total of 52 appearances with the Senators. He went 2–5 with a 7.36 ERA in 1949, walking 89 and striking out only 37 in 95 1/3 innings of work. He finished second in the league in appearances that season, trailing only Joe Page's 55. As well, he finished third in the league in games finished with 25, trailing only Joe Page (48) and Tom Ferrick (29).

He made only five appearances with the Senators in 1950, going 0–0 with a 3.00 ERA. He walked six and struck out two in six innings of work. He played in his final game on June 15, 1950.

Overall, Welteroth went 4–6 with a 6.48 ERA in 90 games (four starts) over three big league seasons. He pitched 166 2/3 innings, allowing 185 hits and 145 walks while striking out only 55 batters. He also finished 42 games.

He also spent eight seasons pitching in the minor leagues, going 31–55 in 152 games.
