= Ray Scarborough =

American baseball player (1917–1982)

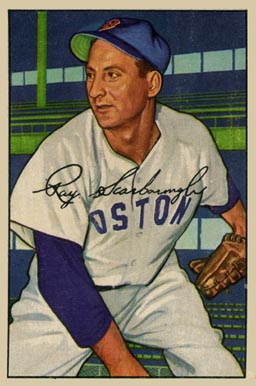
- Pitcher
- Born: July 23, 1917; Mount Gilead, North Carolina, U.S.
- Died: July 1, 1982 (aged 64); Mount Olive, North Carolina, U.S.
- Batted: Right Threw: Right

MLB debut
- June 26, 1942, for the Washington Senators

Last MLB appearance
- September 25, 1953, for the Detroit Tigers

MLB statistics
- Win–loss record: 80–85
- Earned run average: 4.13
- Strikeouts: 564
- Stats at Baseball Reference

Teams
- Washington Senators (1942–1943, 1946–1950); Chicago White Sox (1950); Boston Red Sox (1951–1952); New York Yankees (1952–1953); Detroit Tigers (1953)

Career highlights and awards
- All-Star (1950); World Series champion (1952)
Other name	"pickle packing pitcher"
Education	Wake Forest University
Occupation	science teacher
Known for	Major League Baseball scout

Rae Wilson Scarborough (July 23, 1917 – July 1, 1982) was an American starting pitcher in Major League Baseball (MLB) who played for the Washington Senators (1942–1943 and 1946–1950), Chicago White Sox (1950), Boston Red Sox (1951–52), New York Yankees (1952–53) and Detroit Tigers (1953). Scarborough batted and threw right-handed.

After his playing career, Scarborough coached and scouted for MLB teams.

== Early years and education ==
Rae Wilson Scarborough was born on July 23, 1917, in Mount Gilead, North Carolina to Bina and Oscar Scarborough. He was the fourth of their seven children. Their father, who played semipro baseball, built a baseball field for his children.

Ray Scarborough graduated from Mount Gilead High School in 1934 and then attended Rutherford Junior College for one year. He went on to Wake Forest University where he excelled academically and in sports. He played tennis, basketball, football, and baseball - distinguishing himself as a pitcher with a 33-9-1 record. (Note: The year 1938 is not included in his Wake Forest statistics, as the university's records are "incomplete".) He was inducted into the Phi Beta Kappa honor society and graduated with a Bachelor of Science degree from Wake Forest in 1942.

After graduation, he worked as a biology and science teacher. He also played local semi-professional baseball in North Carolina.

== Playing career - MLB ==
In a ten-season career, Scarborough posted an 80–85 win–loss record in 318 games, 168 games started, 59 complete games, 9 shutouts, 75 games finished, 12 saves, 1,428 2/3 innings pitched, 1,487 hits allowed, 755 runs allowed, 656 earned runs allowed, 88 home runs allowed, 611 walks, 564 strikeouts, 44 hit batsmen, 30 wild pitches, 6,297 batters faced, 4 balks and a 4.13 ERA.

Scarborough began his major league baseball career with the Washington Senators. He was used sparingly by the Senators before World War II. He missed the 1944 and 1945 seasons while he served in the U.S. Navy. When he returned from his military service, he developed into a reliable starter. His most productive season came in 1948, when he had a 15–8 mark and recorded a 2.82 ERA, being only surpassed by Gene Bearden (2.43). In 1949 he won 13 games with the Senators, and again won 13 in 1950 for Washington (3) and the Chicago White Sox (10), a season in which he made his only All-Star appearance. On September 28, 1949, Scarborough ended Ted Williams' streak of most consecutive games reaching base safely at 84 games.

After winning 12 games for the Boston Red Sox in 1951, Scarborough was purchased by the New York Yankees in the 1952 midseason, as he went 5–1 during New York's successful pennant drive en route to the 1952 World Series. He played for the Yankees and Detroit Tigers in 1953, his last major league season. He announced his retirement on January 14, 1954.

Scarborough often received attention from the press in New York and Boston due to his off-season work as a pickle salesman for the Mt. Olive Pickle Company in Mount Olive, N.C. Newspapers called him the "pickle peddling pitcher" or "pickle peddling pitcher", while others ran cartoons showing him dunking opposing players in pickle barrels.

== Retirement ==
Following his playing career, Scarborough returned to Mount Olive, North Carolina, to the home he had built there in 1947. He then opened Scarborough Oil and Supply Company in Mount Olive.

In 1960, he began his scouting career with the Baltimore Orioles He went on to scout for the California Angels (1973) and Milwaukee Brewers (1978–1982).

He began coaching in 1961, as one of three managers for the Class-D Florida State League "Leesburg Orioles". (Note: Cal Ripken Sr. was one of the other managers of the Leesburg team.) He spent the first part of the 1968 season on the Orioles' MLB coaching staff.

In the early 1980, Scarborough was the driving force behind reestablishing the baseball program at Mount Olive College (now the University of Mount Olive). His involvement included recruiting and development for the team, designing the baseball field (now named Scarborough Field), and creating an endowment to fund scholarships and field maintenance.

In addition to baseball, Scarborough served his community as alderman of Mount Olive, NC for two years.

== Personal ==
Scarborough married Edna Martin in 1940. They had two daughters.

Scarborough's grandson Garrett Blackwelder played basketball at East Carolina University from 1996 to 2000 and holds several shooting records.

Scarborough died on July 1, 1982, at his home in Mount Olive, North Carolina, at the age of 64.

== Honors ==
Scarborough was inducted into the Wake Forest Sports Hall of Fame in 1976.

He was inducted posthumously into the Mount Olive College Athletics Hall of Fame in 2006. The Scarborough baseball field at the University of Mount Olive is named in his honor.

The Mount Olive Museum has an exhibit dedicated to Ray Scarborough.

== See also ==
- Chicago White Sox all-time roster
