= 1948 Philadelphia Athletics season =

1948 Philadelphia Athletics
- League: American League
- Ballpark: Shibe Park
- City: Philadelphia
- Record: 84–70 (.545)
- League place: 4th
- Owners: Connie Mack
- Managers: Connie Mack
- Television: WPTZ/WCAU (Claude Haring)
- Radio: WIBG (By Saam, Chuck Thompson)

The 1948 Philadelphia Athletics season, the 48th in the history of the American League franchise, resulted in Connie Mack's club finishing in the AL's first division for the first time in 15 years with a record of 84 wins and 70 losses (.545), good enough for fourth place. The 1948 Athletics drew 945,076 fans to Shibe Park, which will be the largest "gate" in their 54-year history in Philadelphia. Their home attendance ranked fifth-best in the AL and eleventh-best among the 16 Major League Baseball teams (and 177,647 higher than their National League tenants, the Phillies).

On the field, the 1948 season represented a dramatic turnaround from the club's dismal 1946 campaign, when it finished last at 49–105, a full 55 games out of first place. In both on- and off-field terms, it will prove to be the high-water mark for the Athletics' final 22 seasons in Philadelphia.

Posting stellar records in May (21–7) and July (18–13) of 1948, the Athletics ranked among the American League's contenders for most of the season, spending May 26 to June 5 in, or virtually tied for, first place. They returned to the AL's top spot on August 1, and held first for the month's first eight days. However, a five-game losing streak from August 20–25, then an eight-game skid between August 29 and September 6, effectively doomed their chances of gaining a tenth pennant for "Mister Mack", the club's 85-year-old manager, co-founder, and principal owner.

Led by pitchers Carl Scheib, Dick Fowler, Lou Brissie and Joe Coleman, and position players Hank Majeski, Eddie Joost, Ferris Fain, Elmer Valo and Barney McCosky, the Athletics finished fourth in the circuit in runs per game (4.73), and fifth in both total runs allowed (735) and staff earned run average (4.43).

== Regular season ==
=== Season standings ===
American League
Team	W	L	Pct.	GB	Home	Road
Cleveland Indians	97	58	.626	—	48‍–‍30	49‍–‍28
Boston Red Sox	96	59	.619	1	55‍–‍23	41‍–‍36
New York Yankees	94	60	.610	2½	50‍–‍27	44‍–‍33
Philadelphia Athletics	84	70	.545	12½	36‍–‍41	48‍–‍29
Detroit Tigers	78	76	.506	18½	39‍–‍38	39‍–‍38
St. Louis Browns	59	94	.386	37	34‍–‍42	25‍–‍52
Washington Senators	56	97	.366	40	29‍–‍48	27‍–‍49
Chicago White Sox	51	101	.336	44½	27‍–‍48	24‍–‍53

=== Record vs. opponents ===
1948 American League record Sources:
Team	BOS	CWS	CLE	DET	NYY	PHA	SLB	WSH
Boston	—	14–8	11–12	15–7	14–8	12–10	15–7	15–7
Chicago	8–14	—	6–16	8–14	6–16	6–16	8–13–1	9–12–1
Cleveland	12–11	16–6	—	13–9	10–12	16–6	14–8–1	16–6
Detroit	7–15	14–8	9–13	—	9–13	12–10	11–11	16–6
New York	8–14	16–6	12–10	13–9	—	12–10	16–6	17–5
Philadelphia	10–12	16–6	6–16	10–12	10–12	—	18–4	14–8
St. Louis	7–15	13–8–1	8–14–1	11–11	6–16	4–18	—	10–12
Washington	7–15	12–9–1	6–16	6–16	5–17	8–14	12–10	—

=== Notable transactions ===
- April 3, 1948: The Athletics sell the contract of relief pitcher Russ Christopher to the Cleveland Indians.
- May 15, 1948: The Athletics purchase the contract of relief pitcher Nels Potter from the St. Louis Browns for $17,500.
- June 4, 1948: The Athletics trade outfielder George Binks and $20,000 to the St. Louis Browns for outfielder Ray Coleman.
- June 14, 1948: The Athletics release pitchers Bill Dietrich and Nels Potter.

=== Roster ===
1948 Philadelphia Athletics
Roster
Pitchers: 19 Lou Brissie; 20 Joe Coleman; 18 Bill Dietrich; 25 Dick Fowler; 17 Bubba Harris; 18 Wally Holborow; 22 Alex Kellner; 21 Phil Marchildon; 23 Bill McCahan; 22 Nels Potter; 16 Bob Savage; 24 Carl Scheib	Catchers: 28 Earle Brucker Jr.; 14 Herman Franks; 9 Mike Guerra; 8 Buddy Rosar; Infielders: 30 Billy DeMars; 5 Ferris Fain; 41 Nellie Fox; 1 Eddie Joost; 3 Hank Majeski; 12 Pete Suder; 2 Skeeter Webb; 56 Bob Wellman; 6 Rudy York	Outfielders: 11 George Binks; 4 Sam Chapman; 11 Ray Coleman; 7 Barney McCosky; 10 Elmer Valo; 15 Don White	Manager: -- Connie Mack; Coaches: Lena Blackburne; 26 Earle Brucker; 29 Dave Keefe; 27 Earle Mack; 32 Al Simmons

== Player stats ==
=== Batting ===
==== Starters by position ====
Note: Pos = Position; G = Games played; AB = At bats; H = Hits; Avg. = Batting average; HR = Home runs; RBI = Runs batted in

Pos	Player	G	AB	H	Avg.	HR	RBI
C	Buddy Rosar	90	302	77	.255	4	41
1B	Ferris Fain	145	520	146	.281	7	88
2B	Pete Suder	148	519	125	.241	7	60
SS	Eddie Joost	135	509	127	.250	16	55
3B	Hank Majeski	148	590	183	.310	12	120
OF	Elmer Valo	113	383	117	.305	3	46
OF	Barney McCosky	135	515	168	.326	0	46
OF	Sam Chapman	123	445	115	.258	13	70

==== Other batters ====
Note: G = Games played; AB = At bats; H = Hits; Avg. = Batting average; HR = Home runs; RBI = Runs batted in

Player	G	AB	H	Avg.	HR	RBI
Don White	86	253	62	.245	1	28
Ray Coleman	68	210	51	.243	0	21
Mike Guerra	53	142	30	.211	1	23
Herman Franks	40	98	22	.224	1	14
Skeeter Webb	23	54	8	.148	0	3
Rudy York	31	51	8	.157	0	6
George Binks	17	41	4	.098	0	2
Billy DeMars	18	29	5	.172	0	1
Nellie Fox	3	13	2	.154	0	0
Bob Wellman	4	10	2	.200	0	0
Earle Brucker	2	6	1	.167	0	0

=== Pitching ===
==== Starting pitchers ====
Note: G = Games pitched; IP = Innings pitched; W = Wins; L = Losses; ERA = Earned run average; SO = Strikeouts

Player	G	IP	W	L	ERA	SO
Phil Marchildon	33	226.1	9	15	4.53	66
Joe Coleman	33	215.2	14	13	4.09	86
Dick Fowler	29	204.2	15	8	3.78	50
Carl Scheib	32	198.2	14	8	3.94	44
Bill McCahan	17	86.2	4	7	5.71	20

==== Other pitchers ====
Note: G = Games pitched; IP = Innings pitched; W = Wins; L = Losses; ERA = Earned run average; SO = Strikeouts

Player	G	IP	W	L	ERA	SO
Lou Brissie	39	194.0	14	10	4.13	127
Wally Holborow	5	17.1	1	2	5.71	3
Bill Dietrich	4	15.1	1	2	5.87	5

==== Relief pitchers ====
Note: G = Games pitched; W = Wins; L = Losses; SV = Saves; ERA = Earned run average; SO = Strikeouts

Player	G	W	L	SV	ERA	SO
Bubba Harris	45	5	2	5	4.13	32
Bob Savage	33	5	1	5	6.21	26
Alex Kellner	13	0	0	0	7.83	14
Nels Potter	8	2	2	1	4.00	13

== Farm system ==
Level	Team	League	Manager
A	Savannah Indians	Sally League	Eric McNair
A	Lincoln Athletics	Western League	Jimmie DeShong
C	Martinsville Athletics	Carolina League	Eddie Morgan
C	Moline/Kewanee A's	Central Association	Joe Glenn
D	Welch Miners	Appalachian League	Woody Wheaton
D	Federalsburg A's	Eastern Shore League	Ducky Detweiler
D	Moultrie Athletics	Georgia–Florida League	Joe Antolick
D	Lexington Indians	North Carolina State League	Homer Lee Cox
D	Portsmouth A's	Ohio–Indiana League	George Staller
D	Red Springs Red Robins	Tobacco State League	Red Norris

LEAGUE CHAMPIONS: Martinsville, Red Springs
Moline franchise moved to Kewanee, June 18, 1948
