= Major League Baseball on DuMont =

Major League Baseball on DuMont refers to the now defunct DuMont Television Network's coverage of Major League Baseball. More specifically, DuMont broadcast the World Series (during its very early years as a televised event) from 1947-1949.

== World Series coverage ==
Gillette, which produced World Series telecasts from roughly 1947-1965 (before 1966, local announcers, who were chosen by the Gillette Company, the Commissioner of Baseball, and NBC television, exclusively called the World Series), paid for airtime on DuMont's owned-and-operated Pittsburgh affiliate, WDTV (now KDKA-TV) to air the World Series. In the meantime, Gillette also bought airtime on ABC, CBS, and NBC. More to the point, in some cities, the World Series was broadcast on three different stations at once. For example, the 1947 World Series (for which DuMont only televised Games 2, 6–7 with Bill Slater on the call) was only seen in four markets via coaxial inter-connected stations: New York City, New York; Philadelphia, Pennsylvania; Schenectady, New York; Washington, District of Columbia; and, environs surrounding these cities. Outside of New York, coverage was pooled.

For the 1948 World Series, games in Boston were only seen in the Northeast. Meanwhile, games in Cleveland were only seen in the Midwest and Pittsburgh. The games were open to all channels with a network affiliation. In all, the 1948 World Series was televised to fans in seven Midwestern cities: Cleveland, Chicago, Detroit, Milwaukee, St. Louis, and Toledo. By 1949, World Series games could now be seen east of the Mississippi River. The games were open to all channels with a network affiliation.

Year	Network	Play-by-play announcers
1949	NBC, CBS, DuMont and ABC	Jim Britt
1948	NBC, CBS, DuMont and ABC	Red Barber; Tom Hussey (Games 1–2, 6); Van Patrick (Games 3–5)
1947	NBC (Games 1, 5); CBS (Games 3–4); DuMont (Games 2, 6–7)	Bob Stanton; Bob Edge; Bill Slater

== Attempts at creating a regular season national package ==
By the start of the 1950s, Major League Baseball was, for the most part, still in the province of the local market television stations. Outside of these markets, however, televised baseball (unlike on radio) was rare. DuMont's sports programming head, Thomas McMahon was working with individual owners to televise Major League Baseball's first regular season national games in the summer of 1953.

McMahon planned (as far back as January 1953) to set up a corporation to sell the national MLB telecasts meanwhile, giving stock shares to minor league teams. More specifically, McMahon's plan was to negotiate with individual teams rather than Major League Baseball as a whole. This way, McMahon could avoid a potential antitrust suit from the Department of Justice. In order to counter the possible negative effect on the minors (which Western League president Edwin C. Johnson most predominately feared), McMahon would offer them a piece of the national television pie. Furthermore, McMahan argued that since the planned DuMont games would be held on Saturday afternoons, the minors that scheduled most of their games in the evening wouldn't have been greatly affected.

Ultimately, however, the first national Game of the Week package didn't air on DuMont, but on ABC. In April 1953, ABC set out to sell teams rights but instead, only got the Philadelphia Athletics, Cleveland Indians, and Chicago White Sox to sign on. To make matters worse, Major League Baseball barred the Game of the Week from airing within 50 miles of any ballpark.

== Major League Baseball on DuMont's affiliates ==
DuMont's owned-and-operated stations are highlighted in yellow. The Paramount owned-and-operated stations, which did not carry DuMont programs but were ruled DuMont O&Os by the FCC, are shown in pink. Franchises that were later relocated are listed in italics.

=== American League ===
Team	Stations	Years
Baltimore Orioles	WJZ 13	1958-1961; 1964-1978; 1994-2017
Boston Red Sox	WBZ-TV; WNAC 7 (later WHDH); WLVI 56	1948-1974; 2003 (a handful of games); 1948-1954; 1999
Chicago White Sox	WGN 9	1948–1967; 1981; 1990-present
Cleveland Indians	WEWS 5 WXEL 8 (later WJW)	1948-1949; 1956-1960; 1950-1955
Detroit Tigers	WDIV 4 (formerly WWDT & WWJ-TV); WJBK 2	1948-1952; 1978-1994; 1953-1977; 2007
Houston Astros	KPRC 2	1973–1978 (Sundays only from 1977–1978)
Kansas City Athletics	WDAF 4 KCMO 5 (later KCTV)	1958-1961; 1962-1967
Kansas City Royals	KMBC 9	1969-1971; 1998-2002
Los Angeles Angels of Anaheim	KTLA 5	1964-1995
Minnesota Twins	WTCN 11 (later KARE); KMSP 9	1961-1972; 1975-1978; 1979-1988; 1998-2002
New York Yankees	WABD 5	1946-1950; 1999-2001
Oakland Athletics	KPIX 5	1975-1981; 1985-1992
Philadelphia Athletics	WFIL 6 (later WPVI)	1949-1954
Washington Senators (original franchise)	WTTG 5	1948-1958
Seattle Mariners	KING 5 KSTW 11; KXLY 4 (Spokane)	1977-1980; 1981-1985; 1989-1993; 1999; 2003-2007; 1991
St. Louis Browns	KSD 5 (later KSDK); KTVI 2	1948-1952; 1953

=== National League ===
Team	Stations	Years
Boston Braves	WBZ 4/WNAC 7 (later WHDH); WBZ-TV	1948-1949; 1950-1952
Brooklyn Dodgers	WABD 5 (later WNYW)	August 17, 1953-October 1, 1953
Chicago Cubs	WGN 9	1948-present
Cincinnati Reds	WLWT 5	1948-1995
Los Angeles Dodgers	KTTV 11; KTLA 5	1993-2001; 1958-1992
Milwaukee Braves	WTMJ 4	1962-1964
Milwaukee Brewers	WTMJ 4 WVTV 18	1972-1980; 1981-1988; 1993-1997
Philadelphia Phillies	WFIL 6 (later WPVI)	1959-1970
Pittsburgh Pirates	KDKA 2	1958-1995
San Diego Padres	KFMB 8	1980-1983; 1995-1996
St. Louis Cardinals	KSDK 5 (formerly KSD)	1948-1958; 1963-1987; 2007-2010
