= 1948 Chicago White Sox season =

1948 Chicago White Sox
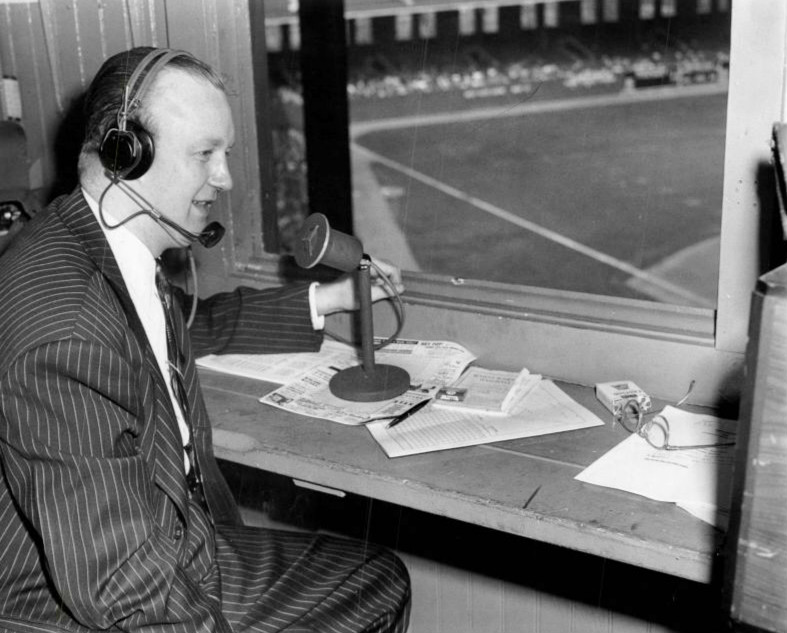
- Announcer Jack Brickhouse at a White Sox Game in 1948
- League: American League
- Ballpark: Comiskey Park
- City: Chicago
- Owners: Grace Comiskey
- General managers: Leslie O'Connor
- Managers: Ted Lyons
- Television: WGN-TV (Jack Brickhouse, Harry Creighton)
- Radio: WJJD/WEFM (Bob Elson)

The 1948 Major League Baseball season was the Chicago White Sox' 48th season in the major leagues, and its 49th season overall. They finished eighth (last) in the American League with a 51–101 record, 44.5 games behind the first place Cleveland Indians. In 114 seasons, the White Sox have only once (in 1932) had a worse winning percentage. This was the first year of many for White Sox television broadcasts on WGN-TV channel 9.

== Offseason ==
- November 19, 1947: Pete Wojey was drafted from the White Sox by the Brooklyn Dodgers in the 1947 minor league draft.
- January 27, 1948: Thurman Tucker was traded by the White Sox to the Cleveland Indians for Ralph Weigel.
- February 24, 1948: Ed Lopat was traded by the White Sox to the New York Yankees for Bill Wight, Fred Bradley, and Aaron Robinson.
- Prior to 1948 season: Ed McGhee was signed as an amateur free agent by the White Sox.

== Regular season ==
Frank Lane was in his first season as White Sox general manager. Over the next seven years with the White Sox, Lane would make 241 trades. He would gain the nicknames "Trader" Lane and "Frantic Frank".

On July 18, Pat Seerey hit four home runs in an eleven inning game against the Philadelphia Athletics. The White Sox won, 12–11.

=== Season standings ===
American League
Team	W	L	Pct.	GB	Home	Road
Cleveland Indians	97	58	.626	—	48‍–‍30	49‍–‍28
Boston Red Sox	96	59	.619	1	55‍–‍23	41‍–‍36
New York Yankees	94	60	.610	2½	50‍–‍27	44‍–‍33
Philadelphia Athletics	84	70	.545	12½	36‍–‍41	48‍–‍29
Detroit Tigers	78	76	.506	18½	39‍–‍38	39‍–‍38
St. Louis Browns	59	94	.386	37	34‍–‍42	25‍–‍52
Washington Senators	56	97	.366	40	29‍–‍48	27‍–‍49
Chicago White Sox	51	101	.336	44½	27‍–‍48	24‍–‍53

=== Record vs. opponents ===
1948 American League record Sources:
Team	BOS	CWS	CLE	DET	NYY	PHA	SLB	WSH
Boston	—	14–8	11–12	15–7	14–8	12–10	15–7	15–7
Chicago	8–14	—	6–16	8–14	6–16	6–16	8–13–1	9–12–1
Cleveland	12–11	16–6	—	13–9	10–12	16–6	14–8–1	16–6
Detroit	7–15	14–8	9–13	—	9–13	12–10	11–11	16–6
New York	8–14	16–6	12–10	13–9	—	12–10	16–6	17–5
Philadelphia	10–12	16–6	6–16	10–12	10–12	—	18–4	14–8
St. Louis	7–15	13–8–1	8–14–1	11–11	6–16	4–18	—	10–12
Washington	7–15	12–9–1	6–16	6–16	5–17	8–14	12–10	—

=== Opening Day lineup ===
- Don Kolloway, 2B
- Luke Appling, 3B
- Tony Lupien, 1B
- Bob Kennedy, RF
- Taffy Wright, LF
- Jack Wallaesa, SS
- Dave Philley, CF
- Mike Tresh, C
- Joe Haynes, P

=== Roster ===
1948 Chicago White Sox
Roster
Pitchers: 39 Fred Bradley; 46 Earl Caldwell; 28 Al Gettel; 36 Bob Gillespie; 37 Jim Goodwin; 45 Orval Grove; 46 Randy Gumpert; 49 Earl Harrist; 35 Joe Haynes; 48 Howie Judson; 38 Glen Moulder; 17 Frank Papish; 19,38 Ike Pearson; 49,15,14 Marino Pieretti; 37,40 Marv Rotblatt; 29 Bill Wight	Catchers: 18 Aaron Robinson; 15 Mike Tresh; 26 Ralph Weigel; Infielders: 4 Luke Appling; 8 Floyd Baker; 47 Don Kolloway; 3 Tony Lupien; 7 Cass Michaels; 12 Jack Wallaesa; -- Frank Whitman	Outfielders: 2 Herb Adams; 2 Jim Delsing; 25 Ralph Hodgin; 5 Bob Kennedy; 9 Dave Philley; 14 Jerry Scala; 5 Pat Seerey; 6 Taffy Wright	Manager: 16 Ted Lyons; Coaches: 23 Red Faber; 33 Bing Miller; 22 Buster Mills

== Player stats ==
=== Batting ===
Note: G = Games played; AB = At bats; R = Runs scored; H = Hits; 2B = Doubles; 3B = Triples; HR = Home runs; RBI = Runs batted in; BB = Base on balls; SO = Strikeouts; AVG = Batting average; SB = Stolen bases

Player	G	AB	R	H	2B	3B	HR	RBI	BB	SO	AVG	SB
Herb Adams, RF, CF	5	11	1	3	1	0	0	0	1	1	.273	0
Luke Appling, 3B, SS	139	497	63	156	16	2	0	47	94	35	.314	10
Floyd Baker, 3B, 2B	104	335	47	72	8	3	0	18	73	26	.215	4
Jim Delsing, CF	20	63	5	12	0	0	0	5	5	12	.190	0
Ralph Hodgin, OF	114	331	28	88	11	5	1	34	21	11	.266	0
Bob Kennedy, LF, RF	30	113	4	28	8	1	0	14	4	17	.248	0
Don Kolloway, 2B, 3B	119	417	60	114	14	4	6	38	18	18	.273	2
Tony Lupien, 1B	154	617	69	152	19	3	6	54	74	38	.246	11
Cass Michaels, SS, 2B	145	484	47	120	12	6	5	56	69	42	.248	8
Dave Philley, CF, LF	137	488	51	140	28	3	5	42	50	33	.287	8
Aaron Robinson, C	98	326	47	82	14	2	8	39	46	30	.252	0
Jerry Scala, CF	3	6	1	0	0	0	0	0	0	3	.000	0
Pat Seerey, LF, CF	95	340	44	78	11	0	18	64	61	94	.229	0
Mike Tresh, C	39	108	10	27	1	0	1	11	9	9	.250	0
Jack Wallaesa, SS	33	48	2	9	0	0	1	3	1	12	.188	0
Ralph Weigel, C, LF	66	163	8	38	7	3	0	26	13	18	.233	1
Frank Whitman, SS	3	6	0	0	0	0	0	0	0	3	.000	0
Taffy Wright, RF, LF	134	455	50	127	15	6	4	61	38	18	.279	2

Player	G	AB	R	H	2B	3B	HR	RBI	BB	SO	AVG	SB
Fred Bradley, P	8	1	0	0	0	0	0	0	0	0	.000	0
Earl Caldwell, P	25	5	0	0	0	0	0	1	2	3	.000	0
Al Gettel, P	24	54	4	13	2	0	0	3	0	6	.241	0
Bob Gillespie, P	25	16	0	0	0	0	0	1	1	10	.000	0
Jim Goodwin, P	8	2	0	1	0	0	0	0	0	0	.500	0
Orval Grove, P	32	21	0	2	0	0	0	0	1	9	.095	0
Randy Gumpert, P	16	29	0	4	0	0	0	1	0	10	.138	0
Earl Harrist, P	11	4	0	0	0	0	0	0	0	0	.000	0
Joe Haynes, P	27	50	5	8	2	0	0	1	3	8	.160	0
Howie Judson, P	41	29	1	3	1	0	0	2	1	13	.103	0
Glen Moulder, P	33	20	3	6	0	1	0	1	1	1	.300	0
Frank Papish, P	32	27	1	5	2	0	0	4	0	6	.185	0
Ike Pearson, P	23	10	0	2	0	0	0	0	0	3	.200	0
Marino Pieretti, P	32	39	5	7	0	0	0	3	4	6	.179	0
Marv Rotblatt, P	7	4	0	0	0	0	0	0	1	2	.000	0
Bill Wight, P	34	73	2	6	0	0	0	3	3	31	.082	0
Team totals	154	5192	558	1303	172	39	55	532	594	528	.251	46

=== Pitching ===
Note: W = Wins; L = Losses; ERA = Earned run average; G = Games pitched; GS = Games started; SV = Saves; IP = Innings pitched; H = Hits allowed; R = Runs allowed; ER = Earned runs allowed; HR = Home runs allowed; BB = Walks allowed; K = Strikeouts

Player	W	L	ERA	G	GS	SV	IP	H	R	ER	HR	BB	K
Fred Bradley	0	0	4.60	8	0	0	15.2	11	12	8	2	4	2
Earl Caldwell	1	5	5.31	25	1	3	39.0	53	25	23	3	22	10
Al Gettel	8	10	4.01	22	19	1	148.0	154	76	66	7	60	49
Bob Gillespie	0	4	5.13	25	6	0	72.0	81	45	41	3	33	19
Jim Goodwin	0	0	8.71	8	1	1	10.1	9	11	10	0	12	3
Orval Grove	2	10	6.16	32	11	1	87.2	110	64	60	6	42	18
Randy Gumpert	2	6	3.79	16	11	0	97.1	103	43	41	6	13	31
Earl Harrist	1	3	5.87	11	1	0	23.0	23	17	15	4	13	14
Joe Haynes	9	10	3.97	27	22	0	149.2	167	79	66	13	52	40
Howie Judson	4	5	4.78	40	5	8	107.1	102	60	57	7	56	38
Glen Moulder	3	6	6.41	33	9	2	85.2	108	67	61	8	54	26
Frank Papish	2	8	5.00	32	14	4	95.1	97	65	53	7	75	41
Ike Pearson	2	3	4.92	23	2	1	53.0	62	32	29	8	27	12
Marino Pieretti	8	10	4.95	21	18	1	120.0	117	70	66	6	52	28
Marv Rotblatt	0	1	7.85	7	2	0	18.1	19	16	16	0	23	4
Bill Wight	9	20	4.80	34	32	1	223.1	238	132	119	9	135	68
Team totals	51	101	4.89	154	154	23	1345.2	1454	814	731	89	673	403

== Farm system ==
Level	Team	League	Manager
AAA	Hollywood Stars	Pacific Coast League	Jimmy Dykes, Lou Stringer and Mule Haas
AA	Memphis Chicks	Southern Association	Jack Onslow
A	Muskegon Clippers	Central League	Bennie Huffman
B	Fall River Indians	New England League	Frank Zubik and Luke Urban
B	Waterloo White Hawks	Illinois–Indiana–Iowa League	Pete Fox
C	Hot Springs Bathers	Cotton States League	Joe Holden and Chips Sobek
C	Oil City Refiners	Middle Atlantic League	Ray Dahlstrom and Otto Denning
C	Superior Blues	Northern League	Johnny Mostil
D	Kingsport Cherokees	Appalachian League	Red Mincy, Joe DiMasi and John Russ
D	Madisonville Miners	KITTY League	George Mathauser, Conrad Juelke and Bob Balance
D	Lima Terriers	Ohio–Indiana League	Charlie Engle
D	Seminole Oilers	Sooner State League	Hugh Willingham
D	Wisconsin Rapids White Sox	Wisconsin State League	Frank Parenti, Frank Demaree and John Kerr

LEAGUE CHAMPIONS: Hot Springs, Seminole
