= Major League Baseball on television in the 1940s =

Baseball culture

NBC television's relationship with Major League Baseball technically dates back to August 26, 1939. It was on that particular date that on W2XBS (an experimental television station in New York City which would ultimately become NBC's flagship station, WNBC), the first-ever Major League Baseball game was televised. With Red Barber announcing, the Brooklyn Dodgers and the Cincinnati Reds played a doubleheader at Ebbets Field. The Reds won the first game 5–2 while the Dodgers won the second, 6–1. Barber called the game without the benefit of a monitor and with only two cameras capturing the game. One camera was on Barber and the other was behind the plate. Barber had to guess from which light was on and where it pointed.

By 1947, television sets, most with five and seven-inch screens, were selling almost as fast as they could be produced. Because of this, Major League teams began televising games and attracted a whole new audience into ballparks in the process. People who had only casually followed baseball began going to the games in person. In 1948, Major League Baseball's total attendance reached a record high of 21 million.

== Year-by-year breakdown ==
=== 1947 ===
Gillette, which produced World Series telecasts from roughly 1947 to 1965 (before 1966, local announcers, who were chosen by the Gillette Company, the Commissioner of Baseball, and NBC television, exclusively called the World Series), paid for airtime on DuMont's owned-and-operated Pittsburgh affiliate, WDTV (now KDKA-TV) to air the World Series. In the meantime, Gillette also bought airtime on ABC, CBS, and NBC. More to the point, in some cities, the World Series was broadcast on three different stations at once. For example, the 1947 World Series (for which DuMont only televised Games 2, 6–7 with Bill Slater on the call) was only seen in four markets via coaxial inter-connected stations: New York City, New York; Philadelphia, Pennsylvania; Schenectady, New York; Washington, District of Columbia; and, environs surrounding these cities. Outside of New York, coverage was pooled.

1947 also saw the first televised World Series. The games were broadcast in the New York City area by NBC's WNBT, CBS's WCBS-TV and DuMont's WABD and sponsored by Gillette and Ford. The October 1947 Billboard reported over 3.9 million viewing the games, primarily on TV sets located in bars (5,400 tavern TV sets in NYC alone). The October 13, 1947 edition of Time magazine reported that President Truman, who had just made the first Oval Office TV appearance on October 5, 1947 and received the first TV for the White House, watched parts of the Series but "skipped the last innings". In addition to New York City, live coverage of the Series was also seen on WRGB in Schenectady/Albany, WPTZ in Philadelphia, WMAR-TV in Baltimore and WTTG in Washington, D.C.

World Series year	Network	Play-by-play announcers
1949	NBC, CBS, DuMont and ABC	Jim Britt
1948	NBC, CBS, DuMont and ABC	Red Barber; Tom Hussey (Games 1–2, 6); Van Patrick (Games 3–5)
1947	NBC (Games 1, 5); CBS (Games 3–4); DuMont (Games 2, 6–7)	Bob Stanton; Bob Edge; Bill Slater

=== 1948 ===
On April 16, 1948, Chicago's WGN-TV (run by Jake Israel) broadcast its first big-league game, with Jack Brickhouse calling the White Sox' 4-1 defeat of the Cubs in an exhibition game at Wrigley Field. WGN televised each Cubs and White Sox home game live. According to Brickhouse,

It worked because the Cubs and White Sox weren't home at the same time. You aired the Sox at Comiskey, or Cubs at Wrigley Field. Daytime scheduling gave the Cubs a decided edge, as Wrigley didn't have lights, so kids came home from school, had a sandwich, and turned the TV on.

In 1948, the World Series would be carried on the aforementioned stations, as well as on WBZ-TV and WNAC-TV in Boston, WNHC-TV in New Haven and WTVR-TV in Richmond, Virginia.

To clarify, games in Boston were only seen in the Northeast. Meanwhile, games in Cleveland were only seen in the Midwest and Pittsburgh. The games were open to all channels with a network affiliation. In all, the 1948 World Series was televised to fans in seven Midwestern cities: Cleveland, Chicago, Detroit, Milwaukee, St. Louis, and Toledo.

Tom Hussey helped Red Barber call Games 1–2 and 6 in Boston, while Van Patrick assisted Barber in calling Games 3-5 in Cleveland.

=== 1949 ===
CBS' first ever official Major League Baseball telecast occurred on July 12, 1949. It was 16th annual All-Star Game from Ebbetts Field in Brooklyn and featured Red Barber on the play-by-play. The Major League Baseball All-Star Game wasn't truly nationally televised until 1952.

By 1949, World Series games could now be seen east of the Mississippi River. The games were open to all channels with a network affiliation.

The World Series was also seen live in other Northeastern and Midwestern cities (Harrisburg, Pittsburgh, Syracuse, Rochester, Buffalo, Erie, Cleveland, Detroit, Columbus, Cincinnati, Dayton, Toledo, Indianapolis, Chicago, Milwaukee and St. Louis) that had been hooked up to network lines over the previous year.
