= Earle Brucker =

Earle Brucker may refer to:

- Earle Brucker Sr. (1901–1981), Major League Baseball catcher and manager
- Earle Brucker Jr. (1925–2009), Major League Baseball catcher
