= 1948 St. Louis Browns season =

Major League Baseball season

1948 St. Louis Browns
- League: American League
- Ballpark: Sportsman's Park
- City: St. Louis, Missouri
- Record: 59–94 (.386)
- League place: 6th
- Owners: Richard Muckerman, Bill DeWitt
- General managers: Bill DeWitt
- Managers: Zack Taylor
- Television: KSD (Bob Ingham)
- Radio: WIL (France Laux)

The 1948 St. Louis Browns season involved the Browns finishing 6th in the American League with a record of 59 wins and 94 losses. It was the first Browns baseball season to be telecast on local television, having debuted its game broadcasts that year on KSD with Bob Ingham on the commentary box as the play by play announcer, nearly a year after other MLB teams made their television debuts.

== Offseason ==
- November 24, 1947: Ed Albrecht was drafted by the Browns from the New York Giants in the 1947 minor league draft.
- December 9, 1947: Johnny Berardino was traded by the Browns to the Cleveland Indians for Catfish Metkovich and $50,000.

== Regular season ==
=== Season standings ===
American League
Team	W	L	Pct.	GB	Home	Road
Cleveland Indians	97	58	.626	—	48‍–‍30	49‍–‍28
Boston Red Sox	96	59	.619	1	55‍–‍23	41‍–‍36
New York Yankees	94	60	.610	2½	50‍–‍27	44‍–‍33
Philadelphia Athletics	84	70	.545	12½	36‍–‍41	48‍–‍29
Detroit Tigers	78	76	.506	18½	39‍–‍38	39‍–‍38
St. Louis Browns	59	94	.386	37	34‍–‍42	25‍–‍52
Washington Senators	56	97	.366	40	29‍–‍48	27‍–‍49
Chicago White Sox	51	101	.336	44½	27‍–‍48	24‍–‍53

=== Record vs. opponents ===
1948 American League record Sources:
Team	BOS	CWS	CLE	DET	NYY	PHA	SLB	WSH
Boston	—	14–8	11–12	15–7	14–8	12–10	15–7	15–7
Chicago	8–14	—	6–16	8–14	6–16	6–16	8–13–1	9–12–1
Cleveland	12–11	16–6	—	13–9	10–12	16–6	14–8–1	16–6
Detroit	7–15	14–8	9–13	—	9–13	12–10	11–11	16–6
New York	8–14	16–6	12–10	13–9	—	12–10	16–6	17–5
Philadelphia	10–12	16–6	6–16	10–12	10–12	—	18–4	14–8
St. Louis	7–15	13–8–1	8–14–1	11–11	6–16	4–18	—	10–12
Washington	7–15	12–9–1	6–16	6–16	5–17	8–14	12–10	—

=== Notable transactions ===
- April 20, 1948: The Browns returned Catfish Metkovich to the Cleveland Indians to complete the deal made on December 9, 1947. The Cleveland Indians also sent $15,000 to the Browns to complete the trade. (Date given is approximate. Exact date is uncertain.)
- June 4, 1948: Ray Coleman was traded by the Browns to the Philadelphia Athletics for George Binks and $20,000.
- June 15, 1948: Sam Zoldak was traded by the Browns to the Cleveland Indians for Bill Kennedy and $100,000.

=== Roster ===
1948 St. Louis Browns
Roster
Pitchers: 22 Frank Biscan; 35 Clem Dreisewerd; 29 Karl Drews; 23 Cliff Fannin; 31 Ned Garver; 30,44 Al Gerheauser; 26 Bill Kennedy; 30 Joe Ostrowski; 27 Nels Potter; 25 Fred Sanford; 20 Ralph Schwamb; 29 Ray Shore; 21 Bryan Stephens; 24 Al Widmar; 28 Jim Wilson; 26 Sam Zoldak	Catchers: 10 Les Moss; 11 Roy Partee; Infielders: 7 Andy Anderson; 3 Hank Arft; 1 Sam Dente; 6 Bob Dillinger; 12 Jerry McCarthy; 4 Eddie Pellagrini; 2 Jerry Priddy; 3 Chuck Stevens	Outfielders: 19 George Binks; 19 Ray Coleman; 19 Dick Kokos; 20 Pete Layden; 17 Paul Lehner; 12 Don Lund; 5 Whitey Platt; 12 Ken Wood; 14 Al Zarilla; Other batters: 8 Tom Jordan; 9 Joe Schultz	Manager: 38 Zack Taylor; Coaches: 33 Fred Hofmann; 35 Jack Tobin; 32 Ralph Winegarner

== Player stats ==
=== Batting ===
==== Starters by position ====
Note: Pos = Position; G = Games played; AB = At bats; H = Hits; Avg. = Batting average; HR = Home runs; RBI = Runs batted in

Pos	Player	G	AB	H	Avg.	HR	RBI
C	Les Moss	107	335	86	.257	14	46
1B	Chuck Stevens	85	287	75	.261	1	26
2B	Jerry Priddy	151	560	166	.296	8	79
SS	Eddie Pellagrini	105	290	69	.238	2	27
3B	Bob Dillinger	153	644	207	.321	2	44
OF	Al Zarilla	144	529	174	.329	12	74
OF	Whitey Platt	123	454	123	.271	7	82
OF	Paul Lehner	103	333	92	.276	2	46

==== Other batters ====
Note: G = Games played; AB = At bats; H = Hits; Avg. = Batting average; HR = Home runs; RBI = Runs batted in

Player	G	AB	H	Avg.	HR	RBI
Sam Dente	98	267	72	.270	0	22
Dick Kokos	71	258	77	.298	4	40
Hank Arft	69	248	59	.238	5	38
Roy Partee	82	231	47	.203	0	17
Don Lund	63	161	40	.248	3	25
Pete Layden	41	104	26	.250	0	4
Andy Anderson	51	87	24	.276	1	12
Joe Schultz Jr.	43	37	7	.189	0	9
Ray Coleman	17	29	5	.172	0	2
Ken Wood	10	24	2	.083	0	2
George Binks	15	23	5	.217	0	1
Jerry McCarthy	2	3	1	.333	0	0
Tom Jordan	1	1	0	.000	0	0

=== Pitching ===
==== Starting pitchers ====
Note: G = Games pitched; IP = Innings pitched; W = Wins; L = Losses; ERA = Earned run average; SO = Strikeouts

Player	G	IP	W	L	ERA	SO
Fred Sanford	42	227.0	12	21	4.64	79
Cliff Fannin	34	213.2	10	14	4.17	102
Bill Kennedy	26	132.0	7	8	4.70	77
Sam Zoldak	11	54.0	2	4	4.67	13
Nels Potter	2	10.1	1	1	5.23	4

==== Other pitchers ====
Note: G = Games pitched; IP = Innings pitched; W = Wins; L = Losses; ERA = Earned run average; SO = Strikeouts

Player	G	IP	W	L	ERA	SO
Ned Garver	38	198.0	7	11	3.41	75
Bryan Stephens	43	122.2	3	6	6.02	35
Joe Ostrowski	26	78.1	4	6	5.97	20
Ray Shore	17	38.0	1	2	6.39	12
Ralph Schwamb	12	31.2	1	1	8.53	7

==== Relief pitchers ====
Note: G = Games pitched; W = Wins; L = Losses; SV = Saves; ERA = Earned run average; SO = Strikeouts

Player	G	W	L	SV	ERA	SO
Al Widmar	49	2	6	2	4.46	34
Frank Biscan	47	6	7	2	6.11	45
Karl Drews	20	3	2	2	8.05	11
Al Gerheauser	14	0	3	0	7.33	10
Clem Dreisewerd	13	0	2	1	5.64	6
Jim Wilson	4	0	0	0	13.50	0

== Farm system ==
Level	Team	League	Manager
AAA	Toledo Mud Hens	American Association	George Detore
AA	San Antonio Missions	Texas League	Gus Mancuso
A	Elmira Pioneers	Eastern League	Packy Rogers
B	Wichita Falls Spudders	Big State League	Marc Carrola
B	Port Chester Clippers	Colonial League	Al Barillari
B	Springfield Browns	Illinois–Indiana–Iowa League	Hank Helf and Irv Hall
C	Globe-Miami Browns	Arizona–Texas League	Don Heffner
C	Modesto Reds	California League	Bill Jackson
C	Gloversville-Johnstown Glovers	Canadian–American League	Jim McDonnell
C	Hannibal Pilots	Central Association	Walt DeFreitas
C	Aberdeen Pheasants	Northern League	Jim Crandall
C	Muskogee Reds	Western Association	Ray Baker
D	Redding Browns	Far West League	Ray Perry
D	Griffin Pimentos	Georgia–Alabama League	Adel White and Fred Campbell
D	Belleville Stags	Illinois State League	Jerry Nemitz and Shan Deniston
D	Pittsburg Browns	Kansas–Oklahoma–Missouri League	Shan Deniston and Don Smith
D	Mayfield Clothiers	KITTY League	Mike Sertich, Ken Jungels and Caroll Peterson
D	Peekskill Highlanders	North Atlantic League	Al Gardella
D	Ada Herefords	Sooner State League	Uke Clanton
D	Wausau Lumberjacks	Wisconsin State League	Joe Skurski

LEAGUE CHAMPIONS: Port Chester, Globe-Miami
