= 1948 New York Yankees season =

Season for the Major League Baseball team the New York Yankees

1948 New York Yankees
- League: American League
- Ballpark: Yankee Stadium
- City: New York City
- Record: 94–60 (.610)
- League place: 3rd
- Owners: Dan Topping and Del Webb
- General managers: George Weiss
- Managers: Bucky Harris
- Television: WABD (Mel Allen, Russ Hodges, Bill Slater)
- Radio: WINS (AM) (Mel Allen, Russ Hodges)

The 1948 New York Yankees season was the team's 46th season. The team finished with a record of 94–60, finishing 2.5 games behind the Cleveland Indians and 1.5 games behind the second-place Boston Red Sox. New York was managed by Bucky Harris. The Yankees played their home games at Yankee Stadium.

The fractional games-behind came about due to the frenzied pennant race, which saw the Yankees, Red Sox and Indians all battling it out to the end. The Yankees fell just a little short, and the Red Sox and Indians finished in a tie for first at 96–58. They held a one-game playoff, which counted as part of the regular season, so the Indians' victory raised their record to 97–58, and dropped the Red Sox to 96–59.

The Yankees did not renew Bucky Harris' contract after the season, opting instead to hire Casey Stengel starting in 1949. This move raised some eyebrows, but Stengel had just led the Oakland Oaks to the Pacific Coast League pennant in 1948, demonstrating that with good talent, he had a good chance to succeed. The Yankees were about to begin the most dominating stretch of their long dynasty.

== Babe Ruth's death ==
Babe Ruth's number 3 was retired by the New York Yankees in 1948.

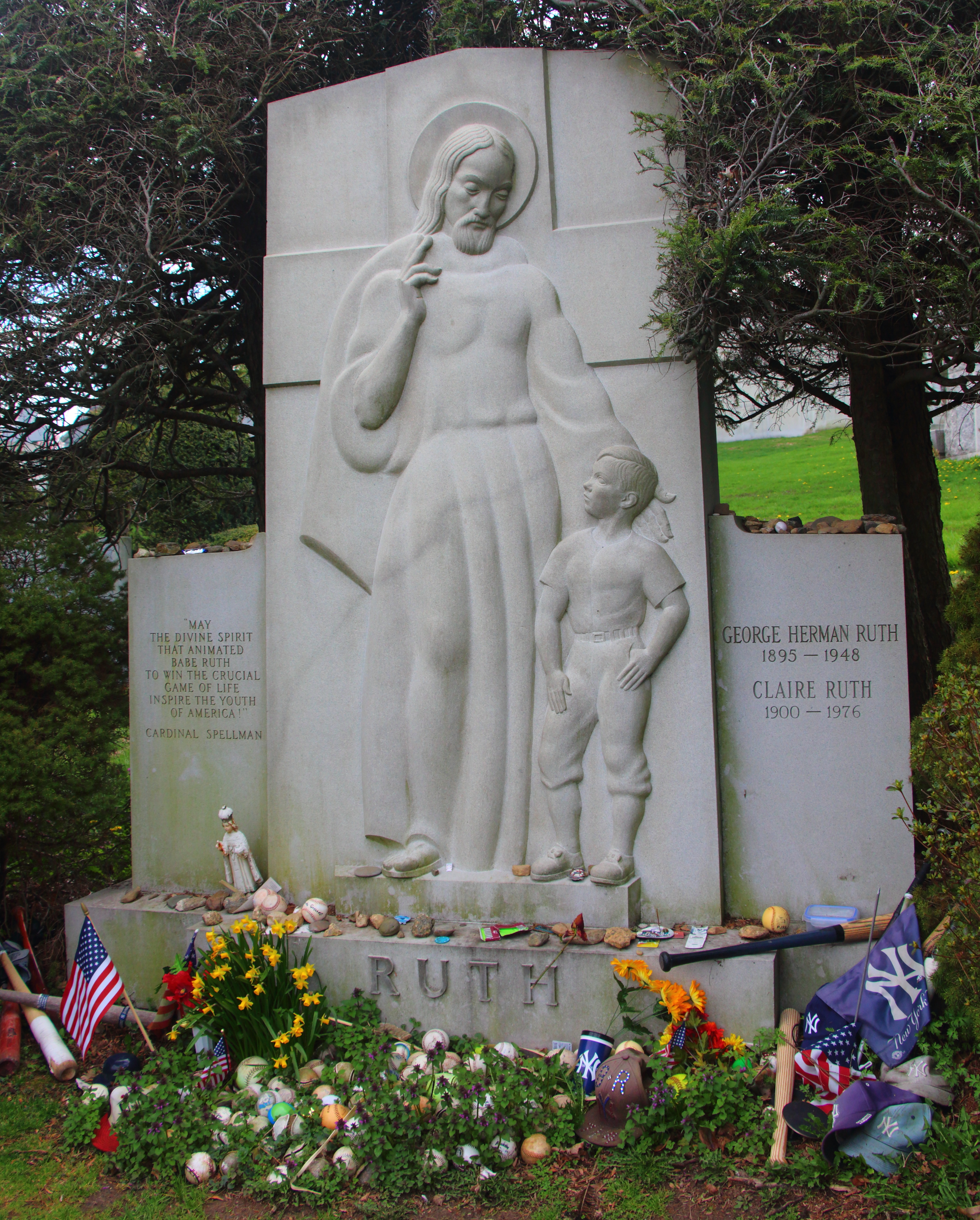
The grave of Babe Ruth

On July 26, 1948, Babe Ruth attended the premiere of the film The Babe Ruth Story, a biopic about his life. William Bendix portrayed Ruth. Shortly thereafter, Ruth returned to the hospital for the final time. He was barely able to speak. Ruth's condition gradually became worse, and in his last days, scores of reporters and photographers hovered around the hospital. Only a few visitors were allowed to see him, one of whom was National League president and future Commissioner of Baseball, Ford Frick. "Ruth was so thin it was unbelievable. He had been such a big man and his arms were just skinny little bones, and his face was so haggard," Frick said years later.

On August 16, the day after Frick's visit, Babe Ruth died at age 53. His body lay in repose in Yankee Stadium. Babe Ruth's funeral was two days later at St. Patrick's Cathedral, New York. Ruth was then buried in the Cemetery of the Gate of Heaven in Hawthorne, New York. The procession ended at Gate of Heaven Cemetery where 6,000 people came witness Ruth's gravesite. His casket was covered with a blanket of roses and orchids.

At his death, the New York Times called Babe Ruth, "a figure unprecedented in American life. A born showman off the field and a marvelous performer on it, he had an amazing flair for doing the spectacular at the most dramatic moment."

== Offseason ==
- February 24, 1948: Bill Wight, Fred Bradley, and Aaron Robinson were traded by the Yankees to the Chicago White Sox for Eddie Lopat.
- Prior to 1948 season: Al Cicotte and Gus Triandos were signed as an amateur free agents by the Yankees.

== Regular season ==
=== Season standings ===
American League
Team	W	L	Pct.	GB	Home	Road
Cleveland Indians	97	58	.626	—	48‍–‍30	49‍–‍28
Boston Red Sox	96	59	.619	1	55‍–‍23	41‍–‍36
New York Yankees	94	60	.610	2½	50‍–‍27	44‍–‍33
Philadelphia Athletics	84	70	.545	12½	36‍–‍41	48‍–‍29
Detroit Tigers	78	76	.506	18½	39‍–‍38	39‍–‍38
St. Louis Browns	59	94	.386	37	34‍–‍42	25‍–‍52
Washington Senators	56	97	.366	40	29‍–‍48	27‍–‍49
Chicago White Sox	51	101	.336	44½	27‍–‍48	24‍–‍53

=== Record vs. opponents ===
1948 American League record Sources:
Team	BOS	CWS	CLE	DET	NYY	PHA	SLB	WSH
Boston	—	14–8	11–12	15–7	14–8	12–10	15–7	15–7
Chicago	8–14	—	6–16	8–14	6–16	6–16	8–13–1	9–12–1
Cleveland	12–11	16–6	—	13–9	10–12	16–6	14–8–1	16–6
Detroit	7–15	14–8	9–13	—	9–13	12–10	11–11	16–6
New York	8–14	16–6	12–10	13–9	—	12–10	16–6	17–5
Philadelphia	10–12	16–6	6–16	10–12	10–12	—	18–4	14–8
St. Louis	7–15	13–8–1	8–14–1	11–11	6–16	4–18	—	10–12
Washington	7–15	12–9–1	6–16	6–16	5–17	8–14	12–10	—

=== Roster ===
1948 New York Yankees
Roster
Pitchers: 28 Tommy Byrne; 19 Karl Drews; 35 Red Embree; 18 Randy Gumpert; 39 Frank Hiller; 30 Eddie Lopat; 21 Cuddles Marshall; 11 Joe Page; 18 Bob Porterfield; 17 Vic Raschi; 22 Allie Reynolds; 20 Spec Shea; 19,36 Dick Starr	Catchers: 8 Yogi Berra; 32 Ralph Houk; 29 Sherm Lollar; 38 Gus Niarhos; 40,46 Charlie Silvera; Infielders: 6 Bobby Brown; 2 Frankie Crosetti; 24 Billy Johnson; 9 George McQuinn; 34,36 Jack Phillips; 10 Phil Rizzuto; 41 Steve Souchock; 1 Snuffy Stirnweiss	Outfielders: 25 Hank Bauer; 5 Joe DiMaggio; 15 Tommy Henrich; 12 Charlie Keller; 27 Johnny Lindell; 3,13 Cliff Mapes; Other batters: 42 Joe Collins; 14 Lonny Frey; 42 Bud Stewart	Manager: 37 Bucky Harris; Coaches: 31 Red Corriden; 2 Frankie Crosetti; 7 Chuck Dressen; 33 Johnny Schulte

== Player stats ==
= Indicates team leader

=== Batting ===
==== Starters by position ====
Note: Pos = Position; G = Games played; AB = At bats; H = Hits; Avg. = Batting average; HR = Home runs; RBI = Runs batted in

Pos	Player	G	AB	H	Avg.	HR	RBI
C	Gus Niarhos	82	228	61	.268	0	19
1B	George McQuinn	94	302	75	.248	11	41
2B	Snuffy Stirnweiss	141	515	130	.252	3	32
3B	Billy Johnson	127	446	131	.294	12	64
SS	Phil Rizzuto	128	464	117	.252	6	50
OF	Joe DiMaggio	153	594	190	.320	39	155
OF	Johnny Lindell	88	309	138	.317	13	55
OF	Tommy Henrich	146	598	181	.308	25	100

==== Other batters ====
Note: G = Games played; AB = At bats; H = Hits; Avg. = Batting average; HR = Home runs; RBI = Runs batted in

Player	G	AB	H	Avg.	HR	RBI
Yogi Berra	125	469	143	.305	14	98
Bobby Brown	113	363	109	.300	3	48
Charlie Keller	83	247	66	.267	6	44
Steve Souchock	44	118	24	.203	3	11
Cliff Mapes	53	88	22	.250	1	12
Hank Bauer	19	50	9	.180	1	9
Sherm Lollar	22	38	8	.211	0	4
Ralph Houk	14	29	8	.276	0	3
Charlie Silvera	4	14	8	.571	0	1
Frankie Crosetti	17	14	4	.286	0	0
Joe Collins	5	5	1	.200	0	2
Bud Stewart	6	5	1	.200	0	0
Jack Phillips	1	2	0	.000	0	0
Lonny Frey	1	0	0	----	0	0

=== Pitching ===
==== Starting pitchers ====
Note: G = Games pitched; IP = Innings pitched; W = Wins; L = Losses; ERA = Earned run average; SO = Strikeouts

Player	G	IP	W	L	ERA	SO
Allie Reynolds	39	236.1	16	7	3.77	101
Eddie Lopat	33	226.2	17	11	3.65	83
Vic Raschi	36	222.2	19	8	3.84	124
Spec Shea	28	155.2	9	10	3.41	71
Bob Porterfield	16	78.0	5	3	4.50	30

==== Other pitchers ====
Note: G = Games pitched; IP = Innings pitched; W = Wins; L = Losses; ERA = Earned run average; SO = Strikeouts

Player	G	IP	W	L	ERA	SO
Tommy Byrne	31	133.2	8	5	3.30	101
Red Embree	20	76.2	5	3	3.76	25
Frank Hiller	22	62.1	5	2	4.04	25

==== Relief pitchers ====
Note: G = Games pitched; IP = Innings pitched; W = Wins; L = Losses; SV = Saves; ERA = Earned run average; SO = Strikeouts

Player	G	IP	W	L	SV	ERA	SO
Joe Page	55	107.2	7	8	16	4.26	77
Karl Drews	19	38	2	3	1	3.79	11
Randy Gumpert	15	25	1	0	0	2.88	12
Dick Starr	1	2	0	0	0	4.50	2
Cuddles Marshall	1	1	0	0	0	0.00	0

== Farm system ==
Level	Team	League	Manager
AAA	Kansas City Blues	American Association	Dick Bartell
AAA	Newark Bears	International League	Bill Skiff
AA	Beaumont Exporters	Texas League	Chick Autry
A	Binghamton Triplets	Eastern League	Buddy Hassett
A	Augusta Tigers	Sally League	Carl Cooper, Mike Garbark and Lefty Jenkins
B	Quincy Gems	Illinois–Indiana–Iowa League	James Adlam
B	Manchester Yankees	New England League	Tom Padden
B	Norfolk Tars	Piedmont League	Earl Bolyard
B	Victoria Athletics	Western International League	Ted Norbert
C	Bisbee-Douglas Miners	Arizona–Texas League	Mel Steiner and Mitch Chetkovich
C	Ventura Yankees	California League	Eddie Kearse
C	Amsterdam Rugmakers	Canadian–American League	Jim McLeod
C	Longview Texans	Lone Star League	Dixie Parsons
C	Butler Yankees	Middle Atlantic League	Jack Farmer
C	Grand Forks Chiefs	Northern League	Gordie Hinkle
C	Twin Falls Cowboys	Pioneer League	Charlie Metro
C	Joplin Miners	Western Association	Johnny Sturm

Level	Team	League	Manager
D	Easton Yankees	Eastern Shore League	Dallas Warren
D	LaGrange Troupers	Georgia–Alabama League	Jim Acton
D	Independence Yankees	Kansas–Oklahoma–Missouri League	Goldie Howard, Burleigh Grimes and Bones Sanders
D	Newark Yankees	Ohio–Indiana League	Bob Dill and Solly Mishkin
D	McAlester Rockets	Sooner State League	Vern Hoscheit
D	Blackstone Barristers	Virginia League	Paul Badgett
D	Fond du Lac Panthers	Wisconsin State League	Fred Collins

LEAGUE CHAMPIONS: Grand Forks, Twin Falls, Independence, Blackstone
