= Aaron Robinson (baseball) =

American baseball player (1915–1966)

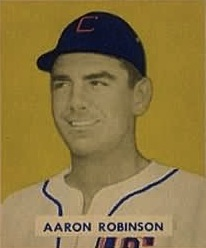
- Robinson's 1949 Bowman Gum baseball card
- Catcher
- Born: June 23, 1915; Lancaster, South Carolina, U.S.
- Died: March 9, 1966 (aged 50); Lancaster, South Carolina, U.S.
- Batted: Left Threw: Right

MLB debut
- May 6, 1943, for the New York Yankees

Last MLB appearance
- September 28, 1951, for the Boston Red Sox

MLB statistics
- Batting average: .260
- Home runs: 61
- Runs batted in: 272
- Stats at Baseball Reference

Teams
- New York Yankees (1943, 1945–1948); Chicago White Sox (1948); Detroit Tigers (1949–1951); Boston Red Sox (1951)

Career highlights and awards
- All-Star (1947); World Series champion (1947)

Aaron Andrew Robinson (June 23, 1915 – March 9, 1966) was an American professional baseball catcher whose career began in 1937 and continued through 1955. He played in Major League Baseball for the New York Yankees, Chicago White Sox, Detroit Tigers and Boston Red Sox. Robinson's tenure with the Yankees spanned the gap between the careers of Yankee Hall of Fame catchers Bill Dickey (1928–1946) and Yogi Berra (1946–1963).

== Biography ==
Robinson was born in June 1915 at Lancaster, South Carolina. He threw right-handed, batted left-handed and was listed as 6 feet 2 inches (1.88 m) tall and 205 pounds (93 kg).

=== Minor leagues ===
His professional playing career began in 1937 in minor league baseball with the Class D Snow Hill Billies in the Coastal Plin lead. He progressed through the minor leagues with stints with the Norfolk Tars (1938), Akron Yankees (1938-1939), Binghamton Triplets (1939-1940), Kansas City Blues (1940-1941), and Newark Bears (1932-1943).

=== Major league career ===
Robinson made his major league debut for the New York Yankees on May 6, 1943, playing in only one game before leaving to serve in the United States Coast Guard for the remainder of World War II. His service in the Coast Guard began on June 21, 1943, and he played baseball while serving. When the war ended in 1945, Robinson returned to the Yankees in July, appearing in 50 games. He took over as the Yankees' starting catcher in 1946 with promising results, posting a .297 batting average along with 16 home runs and 64 runs batted in. He also finished third among American League catchers with 25 baserunners caught stealing, and fourth in assists with 50. Robinson finished 16th in the American League Most Valuable Player Award voting.

Robinson began the 1947 season as the Yankees' starting catcher, and was named as a reserve player for the American League in the 1947 All-Star Game. However, as the season progressed, Yogi Berra began to take over as the starting catcher. Robinson ended the year with a .270 batting average in 82 games, with 5 home runs and 36 runs batted in, as the Yankees went on to win the American League pennant. In the 1947 World Series, Robinson appeared in three games and started in Games 5 and 7, getting two hits in 10 at-bats, as the Yankees defeated the Brooklyn Dodgers in a seven-game series.

Having a surplus of catchers in 1948 with Berra, Sherm Lollar and Gus Niarhos, the Yankees decided to trade Robinson, along with Fred Bradley and Bill Wight, to the Chicago White Sox for Eddie Lopat in February of that year. He played in 98 games for the White Sox, but his offensive statistics continued to decline, as he hit for a .252 batting average. After only one season with the White Sox, Robinson was traded to the Detroit Tigers for Billy Pierce in November 1948.

Robinson became the Tigers' starting catcher in 1949 and 1950, providing solid defense; however, his batting continued to decline. During a pennant race late in the 1950 season, Robinson was involved in a critical play during a game against the Cleveland Indians on September 24. The Tigers had been in first place for most of the season and, had just fallen to second place behind the Yankees with one week left in the season. Heavy smoke from a Canadian forest fire forced the Indians to turn on the lights in Cleveland Stadium for the Sunday afternoon game. With the score tied 1–1, Bob Lemon opened the bottom of the tenth inning with a triple, and two intentional walks followed. With the bases loaded and one out, Luke Easter grounded out to Tigers' first baseman Don Kolloway, who then tagged first base. Because of the haze, Robinson did not see Kolloway remove the force after fielding the ball. Thinking he only had to step on home plate to force out Lemon, he failed to apply a tag, thus allowing Lemon to score the winning run. The Tigers fell two and a half games behind the Yankees in the standings with one week left in the season, and were unable to recover before the season ended.

By the time Robinson was acquired by the Boston Red Sox in 1951, he was hitting for just a .207 batting average. Robinson retired at the end of the 1951 season. In 610 games played in the big leagues, Robinson collected 478 hits, including 74 doubles, 11 triples and 61 home runs. He hit .260 lifetime.

Over his eight years in Major League Baseball, Robinson played in 610 games, accumulating 478 hits in 1,839 at bats for a .260 career batting average, along with 61 home runs and 272 runs batted in. Robinson was a fine defensive catcher, ending his career with a .990 fielding percentage. As of 2020, according to Baseball-Reference, Robinson has the most career wins above replacement of any position player never to have stolen a base.

In 1953 only, the 'Aaron Robinson, MacGregor G176' catcher's mitt was produced. The 1948 trade between the Detroit Tigers and the Chicago White Sox involving Robinson and Pierce has been cited as one of the more lopsided trades in baseball history, as Robinson had retired from baseball by 1951, whereas Pierce had a lengthy, productive career with the White Sox.

=== Managing career ===
After retiring as a player, Robinson became a manager in the minor leagues, managing the Fayetteville Highlanders to the 1954 Carolina League championship. He later managed the Winston-Salem Twins and won another title with the Shelby Colonels, winning the 1961 Western Carolina League championship despite having a losing record. Five years later, Robinson died at age 50, a victim of testicular cancer, on March 9, 1966, in Lancaster, South Carolina.
