= Mike Palm =

Mike Palm may refer to:

- Mike Palm (baseball) (1925–2011), American relief pitcher in Major League Baseball
- Mike Palm (American football) (1899–1974), American American football player in the National Football League
- Mike Palm, a member of Agent Orange (band), American guitarist and vocalist
