= 1948 Boston Red Sox season =

Major League Baseball season

1948 Boston Red Sox
- League: American League
- Ballpark: Fenway Park
- City: Boston, Massachusetts
- Record: 96–59 (.619)
- League place: 2nd
- Owners: Tom Yawkey
- President: Tom Yawkey
- General managers: Joe Cronin
- Managers: Joe McCarthy
- Television: WBZ-TV/WNAC-TV (Jim Britt, Tom Hussey, Bump Hadley)
- Radio: WHDH (Jim Britt, Tom Hussey)
- Stats: ESPN.com; Baseball Reference

The 1948 Boston Red Sox season was the 48th season in the franchise's Major League Baseball history. After 154 regular-season games, the Red Sox and Cleveland Indians finished atop the American League with identical records of 96 wins and 58 losses. The teams then played a tie-breaker game, which was won by Cleveland, 8–3. Thus, the Red Sox finished their season with a record of 96 wins and 59 losses, one game behind Cleveland.

This was the first Red Sox season to be broadcast on television, with broadcasts alternated between WBZ-TV and WNAC-TV, with the same broadcast team regardless of broadcasting station. The first Red Sox game to be broadcast on television was on July 2, 1948, a 4–2 loss to the Philadelphia Athletics.

== Offseason ==
In December 1947, the Red Sox made a deal with the St. Louis Browns. The Sox acquired Vern Stephens, Billy Hitchcock, and pitchers Jack Kramer and Ellis Kinder. The deal cost $375,000 and 11 Red Sox players.

=== Notable transactions ===
- Prior to 1948 season (exact date unknown)
  - Milt Bolling was signed as an amateur free agent by the Red Sox.
  - Bob Smith was signed as an amateur free agent by the Red Sox.

== Regular season ==
In 1948, Kramer led the American League in winning percentage. The manager of the team was former New York Yankees manager Joe McCarthy, who replaced the outgoing Joe Cronin. Cronin had led the Red Sox to an 83–71 record in 1947, finishing in third place.

Throughout 1948, the Sox, New York Yankees, and the Cleveland Indians slugged it out for the pennant. At the end of the regular season, Boston and Cleveland were tied for first place. Each team had a record of 96 wins and 58 losses, two games ahead of the Yankees.

=== American League Playoff ===
At the end of the season, the Red Sox and the Indians were tied for first place. This led to the American League's first-ever one-game playoff. The game was played at Fenway Park on Monday, October 4, 1948. The start time was 1:15 pm EST.

McCarthy picked former St. Louis Browns pitcher Denny Galehouse, who had an 8–7 pitching record, to be his starter. According to Mel Parnell, McCarthy chose Galehouse on the basis that he pitched well in relief against the Indians in Cleveland, whilst Billy Hitchcock reasoned that McCarthy chose Galehouse on the grounds that Galehouse's slider would keep Cleveland's right-handed hitters away from Fenway's left-field wall.

The Indians won the game by the score of 8–3. Indians third baseman Ken Keltner contributed to the victory with his single, double, and 3-run homer over the Green Monster in the 4th inning. Later, McCarthy said he had no rested arms and that there was no else who could pitch. Mel Parnell and Ellis Kinder claimed that they were both ready to pitch.

=== Season standings ===
American League
Team	W	L	Pct.	GB	Home	Road
Cleveland Indians	97	58	.626	—	48‍–‍30	49‍–‍28
Boston Red Sox	96	59	.619	1	55‍–‍23	41‍–‍36
New York Yankees	94	60	.610	2½	50‍–‍27	44‍–‍33
Philadelphia Athletics	84	70	.545	12½	36‍–‍41	48‍–‍29
Detroit Tigers	78	76	.506	18½	39‍–‍38	39‍–‍38
St. Louis Browns	59	94	.386	37	34‍–‍42	25‍–‍52
Washington Senators	56	97	.366	40	29‍–‍48	27‍–‍49
Chicago White Sox	51	101	.336	44½	27‍–‍48	24‍–‍53

=== Record vs. opponents ===
1948 American League record Sources:
Team	BOS	CWS	CLE	DET	NYY	PHA	SLB	WSH
Boston	—	14–8	11–12	15–7	14–8	12–10	15–7	15–7
Chicago	8–14	—	6–16	8–14	6–16	6–16	8–13–1	9–12–1
Cleveland	12–11	16–6	—	13–9	10–12	16–6	14–8–1	16–6
Detroit	7–15	14–8	9–13	—	9–13	12–10	11–11	16–6
New York	8–14	16–6	12–10	13–9	—	12–10	16–6	17–5
Philadelphia	10–12	16–6	6–16	10–12	10–12	—	18–4	14–8
St. Louis	7–15	13–8–1	8–14–1	11–11	6–16	4–18	—	10–12
Washington	7–15	12–9–1	6–16	6–16	5–17	8–14	12–10	—

=== Opening Day lineup ===
7	Dom DiMaggio	CF
6	Johnny Pesky	3B
9	Ted Williams	LF
2	Stan Spence	1B
5	Vern Stephens	SS
1	Bobby Doerr	2B
4	Sam Mele	RF
8	Birdie Tebbetts	C
15	Joe Dobson	P

=== Roster ===
1948 Boston Red Sox
Roster
Pitchers: 20 Earl Caldwell; 28 Cot Deal; 15 Joe Dobson; 20 Harry Dorish; 33 Dave Ferriss; 25 Denny Galehouse; 19 Mickey Harris; 21 Tex Hughson; 12 Earl Johnson; 16 Ellis Kinder; 18 Jack Kramer; 35 Windy McCall; 36 Mickey McDermott; 20 Mike Palm; 17 Mel Parnell; 22 Chuck Stobbs	Catchers: 14 Matt Batts; 34 Babe Martin; 8 Birdie Tebbetts; Infielders: 1 Bobby Doerr; 10 Billy Goodman; 11 Billy Hitchcock; 3 Jake Jones; 6 Johnny Pesky; 5 Vern Stephens; 26 Lou Stringer	Outfielders: 7 Dom DiMaggio; 4 Sam Mele; 24 Wally Moses; 2 Stan Spence; 9 Ted Williams; Other batters: 27 Johnny Ostrowski; 23 Neill Sheridan; 23 Tom Wright	Manager: -- Joe McCarthy; Coaches: 30 Del Baker (Third base); 32 Earle Combs (First base); 31 Paul Schreiber (Hitting); 29 Larry Woodall (Bullpen)

== Player stats ==
=== Batting ===
==== Starters by position ====
Note: Pos = Position; G = Games played; AB = At bats; H = Hits; Avg. = Batting average; HR = Home runs; RBI = Runs batted in

Pos	Player	G	AB	H	Avg.	HR	RBI
C	Birdie Tebbetts	128	446	125	.280	5	68
1B	Billy Goodman	127	445	138	.310	1	66
2B	Bobby Doerr	140	527	150	.285	27	111
SS	Vern Stephens	155	635	171	.285	29	137
3B	Johnny Pesky	143	565	159	.281	3	55
OF	Ted Williams	137	509	188	.369	25	127
OF	Stan Spence	114	391	92	.235	12	61
OF	Dom DiMaggio	155	648	185	.285	9	87

==== Other batters ====
Note: G = Games played; AB = At bats; H = Hits; Avg. = Batting average; HR = Home runs; RBI = Runs batted in

Player	G	AB	H	Avg.	HR	RBI
Wally Moses	78	189	49	.259	2	29
Sam Mele	66	180	42	.233	2	25
Billy Hitchcock	49	124	37	.298	1	2
Matt Batts	46	118	37	.314	1	24
Jake Jones	36	105	21	.200	1	8
Lou Stringer	4	11	1	.091	1	1
Babe Martin	4	4	2	.500	0	0
Tom Wright	3	2	1	.500	0	0
Neill Sheridan	2	1	0	.000	0	0
Johnny Ostrowski	1	1	0	.000	0	0

=== Pitching ===
==== Starting pitchers ====
Note: G = Games pitched; IP = Innings pitched; W = Wins; L = Losses; ERA = Earned run average; SO = Strikeouts

Player	G	IP	W	L	ERA	SO
Joe Dobson	38	245.1	16	10	3.56	116
Mel Parnell	35	212.0	15	8	3.14	77
Jack Kramer	29	205.0	18	5	4.35	72
Ellis Kinder	28	178.0	10	7	3.74	53
Mickey Harris	20	113.2	7	10	5.30	42
Windy McCall	1	1.1	0	1	20.25	0

==== Other pitchers ====
Note: G = Games pitched; IP = Innings pitched; W = Wins; L = Losses; ERA = Earned run average; SO = Strikeouts

Player	G	IP	W	L	ERA	SO
Denny Galehouse	27	137.1	8	8	4.00	38
Dave Ferriss	31	115.1	7	3	5.23	30

==== Relief pitchers ====
Note: G = Games pitched; W = Wins; L = Losses; SV = Saves; ERA = Earned run average; SO = Strikeouts

Player	G	W	L	SV	ERA	SO
Earl Johnson	35	10	4	5	4.53	45
Tex Hughson	15	3	1	0	5.12	6
Harry Dorish	9	0	1	0	5.65	5
Earl Caldwell	8	1	1	0	13.00	5
Mickey McDermott	7	0	0	0	6.17	17
Chuck Stobbs	6	0	0	0	6.43	4
Cot Deal	4	1	0	0	0.00	2
Mike Palm	3	0	0	0	6.00	1

== Farm system ==
Level	Team	League	Manager
AAA	Louisville Colonels	American Association	Nemo Leibold and Owen Scheetz
AA	Birmingham Barons	Southern Association	Fred Walters
A	Scranton Red Sox	Eastern League	Mike Ryba
B	Lynn Red Sox	New England League	Eddie Popowski
B	Roanoke Red Sox	Piedmont League	Pinky Higgins
C	El Paso Texans	Arizona–Texas League	Wally Millies
C	Auburn Cayugas	Border League	Phillip "Barnie" Hearn
C	San Jose Red Sox	California League	Marv Owen
C	Oneonta Red Sox	Canadian–American League	Red Marion
D	Milford Red Sox	Eastern Shore League	Clayton Sheedy
D	Oroville Red Sox	Far West League	Nino Bongiovanni
D	Valley Rebels	Georgia–Alabama League	Jesse Danna
D	Wellsville Red Sox	PONY League	Tom Carey

LEAGUE CHAMPIONS: Birmingham, Scranton, Oneonta, Milford
