= 1948 Cleveland Indians season =

1948 Cleveland Indians
- World Series champions American League champions
- League: American League
- Ballpark: Cleveland Municipal Stadium
- City: Cleveland, Ohio
- Owners: Bill Veeck
- General managers: Bill Veeck
- Managers: Lou Boudreau
- Television: WEWS-TV (Van Patrick)
- Radio: WJW (Jack Graney, Jimmy Dudley)

The 1948 Cleveland Indians season was the 48th in franchise history. When the regular season resulted in a first place tie, the Indians won a one-game playoff against the Boston Red Sox to advance to the World Series. Cleveland won the championship by defeating the Boston Braves 4 games to 2 for their first World Series win in 28 years. In 2011, The Sporting News ranked the 1948 Indians the ninth-best team in MLB history.

It was reported years later that teammates Bob Feller and Bob Lemon devised a plan in August to help relay signs to Indian batters that involved a telescope mounted on a tripod (which Feller brought from the war) that was hidden on the scoreboard of Municipal Stadium.

As of 2026, this is the Cleveland Indians' (now Cleveland Guardians) most recent World Series championship. With the Chicago Cubs' 2016 World Series championship, which coincidentally was over Cleveland, being their first since 1908, the Indians now own the longest active world championship drought in Major League Baseball and the second-longest of any of the big four American sports leagues. Only the National Football League's Arizona Cardinals franchise owns a longer active world championship drought of the big four American sports leagues, having not won a world championship since 1947.

This memorable season was the first to be broadcast on television in the Cleveland area on WEWS-TV.

== Off-season ==
In the 1947–48 off-season, owner Bill Veeck signed recent St. Louis Browns manager Muddy Ruel as a coach to join player-manager Lou Boudreau and coach Bill McKechnie, the latter who was also a long-time manager.

Player transactions:

- November 17, 1947: Pete Milne was drafted from the Indians by the New York Giants in the 1947 minor league draft.
- December 9, 1947: Catfish Metkovich and $50,000 were traded by the Indians to the St. Louis Browns for Johnny Berardino.
- January 27, 1948: Ralph Weigel was traded by the Indians to the Chicago White Sox for Thurman Tucker.
- Prior to 1948 season (exact date unknown)
  - Lee Wheat was signed as an amateur free agent by the Indians.
  - Bill Upton was signed as an amateur free agent by the Indians.

== Regular season ==
Boudreau became the first shortstop in the history of the American League to win the MVP Award.

=== Season standings ===
American League
Team	W	L	Pct.	GB	Home	Road
Cleveland Indians	97	58	.626	—	48‍–‍30	49‍–‍28
Boston Red Sox	96	59	.619	1	55‍–‍23	41‍–‍36
New York Yankees	94	60	.610	2½	50‍–‍27	44‍–‍33
Philadelphia Athletics	84	70	.545	12½	36‍–‍41	48‍–‍29
Detroit Tigers	78	76	.506	18½	39‍–‍38	39‍–‍38
St. Louis Browns	59	94	.386	37	34‍–‍42	25‍–‍52
Washington Senators	56	97	.366	40	29‍–‍48	27‍–‍49
Chicago White Sox	51	101	.336	44½	27‍–‍48	24‍–‍53

=== Record vs. opponents ===
1948 American League record Sources:
Team	BOS	CWS	CLE	DET	NYY	PHA	SLB	WSH
Boston	—	14–8	11–12	15–7	14–8	12–10	15–7	15–7
Chicago	8–14	—	6–16	8–14	6–16	6–16	8–13–1	9–12–1
Cleveland	12–11	16–6	—	13–9	10–12	16–6	14–8–1	16–6
Detroit	7–15	14–8	9–13	—	9–13	12–10	11–11	16–6
New York	8–14	16–6	12–10	13–9	—	12–10	16–6	17–5
Philadelphia	10–12	16–6	6–16	10–12	10–12	—	18–4	14–8
St. Louis	7–15	13–8–1	8–14–1	11–11	6–16	4–18	—	10–12
Washington	7–15	12–9–1	6–16	6–16	5–17	8–14	12–10	—

=== Notable transactions ===
- April 20, 1948: Catfish Metkovich was returned to the Indians by the St. Louis Browns. The Indians sent $15,000 to the St. Louis Browns as compensation.(Date given is approximate. Exact date is uncertain.)
- May 6, 1948: Catfish Metkovich, Les Webber and cash were traded by the Indians to the Oakland Oaks for Will Hafey (minors).
- June 15, 1948: Bill Kennedy and $100,000 were traded by the Indians to the St. Louis Browns for Sam Zoldak.
- July 7, 1948: Satchel Paige was signed as a free agent by the Indians.

=== Satchel Paige ===
The Indians made baseball history on July 9. In a game against the St. Louis Browns, with the Browns leading the Indians, 4–1, in the bottom of the fourth inning, Boudreau pulled his starting pitcher, Bob Lemon and brought Negro leagues legend Satchel Paige into the game.

The first batter Paige faced was Browns first baseman Chuck Stevens. Paige did not yet know the signs, and Stevens lined a single into left field. Jerry Priddy bunted Stevens over to second. Next was Whitey Platt, and Paige threw an overhand server for a strike and one sidearm for another strike. Paige then threw his "Hesitation Pitch", which puzzled Platt and led him to throw his bat forty feet up the third base line. Browns manager Zack Taylor bolted from the dugout to talk to umpire Bill McGowan about the pitch. Taylor argued that it was a balk, but McGowan let it stand as a strike. Paige got Al Zarilla to fly out and the inning was over. In the next inning, Paige gave up a leadoff single to Dick Kokos. His catcher simplified his signals, and Paige got Roy Partee to hit into a double play. Larry Doby, the player who broke the American League's color barrier, pinch hit for Paige the following inning.

Paige got his first big league victory on July 15. This was accomplished the night after he pitched in an exhibition game against the Brooklyn Dodgers in front of 65,000 people in Cleveland's Municipal Stadium. The victory came against the Philadelphia Athletics at Shibe Park. The Indians were up 5–3 with the bases loaded in the sixth inning of the second game of a double header. Paige got Eddie Joost to fly out to end the inning. Unfortunately, he gave up two runs the next inning when Ferris Fain doubled and Hank Majeski hit a home run. Paige buckled down and gave up only one more hit the rest of the game, getting five of the next six outs on fly balls. Doby and Ken Keltner would hit home runs in the ninth to give the Indians an 8–5 victory.

On August 3, the Indians were one game behind the Athletics. Boudreau started Paige against the Washington Senators in Cleveland. The 72,562 people that saw the game set a new attendance record for a major league night game. Paige showed his nervousness as he walked two of the first three batters and then gave up a triple to Bud Stewart to fall behind 2–0. By the seventh, the Indians were up 4–2 and held on to give Paige his second victory.

Paige's next start was against the Chicago White Sox at Comiskey Park. 51,013 people paid to see the game, but many thousands more stormed the turnstiles and crashed into the park, overwhelming the few dozen ticket-takers. Paige pitched a complete game shutout, beating the White Sox 5–0.

By August 20, the Indians were in a heated pennant race. Coming into the game against the White Sox, Bob Lemon, Gene Bearden and Sam Zoldak had thrown consecutive shutouts to run up a thirty-inning scoreless streak, eleven shy of the big league record. For this game, played in Cleveland, 78,382 people came to see Paige. This was a full 6,000 more people than the last time that the night attendance record was set. Paige went the distance again, giving up two singles and one double for his second consecutive three-hit shutout. Paige now had a 5–1 record and a low 1.33 ERA.

=== American League Tiebreaker ===
At the end of the season, Cleveland and the Boston Red Sox were tied for first place. This led to the first tiebreaker game in American League history. The Indians defeated the Red Sox 8–3. Knuckleballer Gene Bearden was given the start for the Indians. Red Sox manager Joe McCarthy picked pitcher Denny Galehouse, who had an 8–7 pitching record.

Ken Keltner contributed to the victory with his single, double, and 3-run home run over the Green Monster in Fenway Park in the 4th inning. The Indians moved on to the 1948 World Series against the Boston Braves. Later, McCarthy said he had no rested arms and that there was no else who could pitch. Mel Parnell and Ellis Kinder claimed that they were both ready to pitch.

=== Opening Day Lineup ===
Opening Day Starters
#	Name	Position
38	Thurman Tucker	CF
14	Larry Doby	RF
5	Lou Boudreau	SS
4	Joe Gordon	2B
3	Eddie Robinson	1B
31	Allie Clark	LF
6	Ken Keltner	3B
10	Jim Hegan	C
19	Bob Feller	P

=== Roster ===
1948 Cleveland Indians
Roster
Pitchers: 30 Gene Bearden; 23 Don Black; 18 Russ Christopher; 19 Bob Feller; 22 Mike Garcia; 24 Al Gettel; 27 Steve Gromek; 28,26 Ernest Groth; 29 Bill Kennedy; 16 Ed Klieman; 21 Bob Lemon; 20,17 Lyman Linde; 25 Bob Muncrief; 29 Satchel Paige; 28 Les Webber; 17 Butch Wensloff; 20 Sam Zoldak	Catchers: 10 Jim Hegan; 12 Joe Tipton; Infielders: 2 Johnny Berardino; 28,11 Ray Boone; 5 Lou Boudreau; 4 Joe Gordon; 6 Ken Keltner; 3 Eddie Robinson; 7 Al Rosen	Outfielders: 31 Allie Clark; 14 Larry Doby; 32 Hank Edwards; 35 Wally Judnich; 24 Bob Kennedy; 34 Dale Mitchell; 36 Hal Peck; 37 Pat Seerey; 38 Thurman Tucker; Other batters: 15 Ray Murray	Manager: 5 Lou Boudreau; Coaches: 43 Mel Harder (Pitching & First Base); 41 Bill McKechnie (Third Base); 42 Muddy Ruel (Bullpen); 44 George Susce (Bullpen)

== Player stats ==
= Indicates team leader

=== Batting ===
==== Starters by position ====
Note: Pos = Position; G = Games played; AB = At bats; H = Hits; Avg. = Batting average; HR = Home runs; RBI = Runs batted in

Pos	Player	G	AB	H	Avg.	HR	RBI
C	Jim Hegan	144	472	117	.248	14	61
1B	Eddie Robinson	134	493	125	.254	16	83
2B	Joe Gordon	144	550	154	.280	32	124
3B	Ken Keltner	153	558	166	.297	31	119
SS	Lou Boudreau	152	560	199	.355	18	106
OF	Dale Mitchell	141	608	204	.336	4	56
OF	Larry Doby	121	439	132	.301	14	66
OF	Thurman Tucker	83	242	63	.260	1	19

==== Other batters ====
Note: G = Games played; AB = At bats; H = Hits; Avg. = Batting average; HR = Home runs; RBI = Runs batted in

Player	G	AB	H	Avg.	HR	RBI
Allie Clark	81	271	84	.310	9	38
Wally Judnich	79	218	56	.257	2	29
Hank Edwards	55	160	43	.269	3	18
Johnny Berardino	66	147	28	.190	2	10
Joe Tipton	47	90	26	.289	1	13
Bob Kennedy	66	73	22	.301	0	5
Hal Peck	45	63	18	.286	0	8
Pat Seerey	10	23	6	.261	1	6
Ray Boone	6	5	2	.400	0	1
Al Rosen	5	5	1	.200	0	0
Ray Murray	4	4	0	.000	0	0

=== Pitching ===
==== Starting pitchers ====
Note: G = Games pitched; IP = Innings pitched; W = Wins; L = Losses; ERA = Earned run average; SO = Strikeouts

Player	G	IP	W	L	ERA	SO
Bob Lemon	43	293.2	20	14	2.82	147
Bob Feller	44	280.1	19	15	3.56	164
Gene Bearden	37	229.2	20	7	2.43	80
Sam Zoldak	23	105.2	9	6	2.81	17
Don Black	18	52.0	2	2	5.37	16

==== Other pitchers ====
Note: G = Games pitched; IP = Innings pitched; W = Wins; L = Losses; ERA = Earned run average; SO = Strikeouts

Player	G	IP	W	L	ERA	SO
Bob Muncrief	21	72.1	5	4	3.98	24
Bill Kennedy	6	11.1	1	0	11.12	12
Lyman Linde	3	10.0	0	0	5.40	0
Al Gettel	5	7.2	0	1	17.61	4
Mike Garcia	1	2.0	0	0	0.00	1
Butch Wensloff	1	1.2	0	1	10.80	2
Ernest Groth	1	1.0	0	0	9.00	0
Les Webber	1	0.2	0	0	40.50	1

==== Relief pitchers ====
Note: G = Games pitched; W = Wins; L = Losses; SV = Saves; ERA = Earned run average; SO = Strikeouts

Player	G	W	L	SV	ERA	SO
Russ Christopher	45	3	2	17	2.90	14
Ed Klieman	44	3	2	4	2.60	18
Steve Gromek	38	9	3	2	2.84	50
Satchel Paige	21	6	1	1	2.48	43

== 1948 World Series ==
On October 9, 1948, a new World Series single game attendance record was set during Game 4. 81,897 fans packed Cleveland Stadium but one day later, that record was broken during Game 5. 86,288 fans attended the game.

Satchel Paige appeared in Game 5 for the Indians, becoming the first black pitcher to pitch a game in World Series history. He pitched for two-thirds of an inning in Game Two while the Indians were trailing the Boston Braves, giving up a sacrifice fly to Warren Spahn, got called for a balk and struck out Tommy Holmes.

AL Cleveland Indians (4) vs. NL Boston Braves (2)

Game	Score	Date	Attendance
1	Boston 1, Cleveland 0	October 6	40,135
2	Cleveland 4, Boston 1	October 7	39,633
3	Cleveland 2, Boston 0	October 8	70,306
4	Cleveland 2, Boston 1	October 9	81,897
5	Boston 11, Cleveland 5	October 10	86,288
6	Cleveland 4, Boston 3	October 11	40,103

=== Game 1 ===
October 6, 1948, at Braves Field in Boston, Massachusetts

Team	1	2	3	4	5	6	7	8	9	R	H	E
Cleveland	0	0	0	0	0	0	0	0	0	0	4	0
Boston	0	0	0	0	0	0	0	1	X	1	2	2
WP: Johnny Sain (1–0) LP: Bob Feller (0–1)

=== Game 2 ===
October 7, 1948, at Braves Field in Boston, Massachusetts

Team	1	2	3	4	5	6	7	8	9	R	H	E
Cleveland	0	0	0	2	1	0	0	0	1	4	8	1
Boston	1	0	0	0	0	0	0	0	0	1	8	3
WP: Bob Lemon (1–0) LP: Warren Spahn (0–1)

=== Game 3 ===
October 8 at Cleveland Municipal Stadium in Cleveland, Ohio

Team	1	2	3	4	5	6	7	8	9	R	H	E
Boston	0	0	0	0	0	0	0	0	0	0	5	1
Cleveland	0	0	1	1	0	0	0	0	X	2	5	0
WP: Gene Bearden (1–0) LP: Vern Bickford (0–1)

=== Game 4 ===
October 9, 1948, at Cleveland Municipal Stadium in Cleveland, Ohio

Team	1	2	3	4	5	6	7	8	9	R	H	E
Boston	0	0	0	0	0	0	1	0	0	1	7	0
Cleveland	1	0	1	0	0	0	0	0	X	2	5	0
WP: Steve Gromek (1–0) LP: Johnny Sain (1–1); Home runs: BOS: Marv Rickert (1); CLE: Larry Doby (1)

=== Game 5 ===
October 10, 1948, at Cleveland Municipal Stadium in Cleveland, Ohio

Team	1	2	3	4	5	6	7	8	9	R	H	E
Boston	3	0	1	0	0	1	6	0	0	11	12	0
Cleveland	1	0	0	4	0	0	0	0	0	5	6	2
WP: Warren Spahn (1–1) LP: Bob Feller (0–2); Home runs: BOS: Bob Elliott 2 (2), Bill Salkeld (1); CLE: Dale Mitchell (1), Jim Hegan (1)

=== Game 6 ===
October 11, 1948, at Braves Field in Boston, Massachusetts

Team	1	2	3	4	5	6	7	8	9	R	H	E
Cleveland	0	0	1	0	0	2	0	1	0	4	10	0
Boston	0	0	0	1	0	0	0	2	0	3	9	0
WP: Bob Lemon (2–0) LP: Bill Voiselle (0–1); Home runs: CLE: Joe Gordon (1); BOS: None

== Awards and honors ==
- Lou Boudreau, American League MVP
- Lou Boudreau, Associated Press Athlete of the Year
- Team ERA of 3.22, lowest in MLB for 1948
- Team fielding percentage of .982, highest in MLB for 1948
- Team batting average of .282, highest in MLB for 1948

All-Star Game

- Lou Boudreau, Shortstop, starter
- Joe Gordon, Second baseman, starter
- Ken Keltner, Third baseman, starter
- Bob Feller, reserve
- Bob Lemon, reserve

== Farm system ==
Level	Team	League	Manager
AAA	Baltimore Orioles	International League	Alphonse "Tommy" Thomas
AA	Oklahoma City Indians	Texas League	Pat Ankenman
A	Dayton Indians	Central League	Joe Vosmik
A	Wilkes-Barre Barons	Eastern League	Bill Norman
B	Harrisburg Senators	Interstate League	Les Bell
B	Meridian Peps	Southeastern League	Ben Geraghty and Jack Maupin
B	Spartanburg Peaches	Tri-State League	Kerby Farrell
C	Tucson Cowboys	Arizona–Texas League	Lloyd Brown
C	Bakersfield Indians	California League	Harry Griswold
C	Pittsfield Electrics	Canadian–American League	Gene Hasson
C	Burlington Indians	Central Association	Paul O'Dea, Ski Melillo and Bruno Haas
D	Cordele Indians	Georgia–Florida League	Hal Lee
D	Mattoon Indians	Illinois State League	Chuck Hawley
D	Union City Greyhounds	KITTY League	Tony Rensa
D	Bloomingdale Troopers	North Atlantic League	Jim Jefferies and Stephen Kuk
D	Batavia Clippers	PONY League	George Susce
D	Ardmore Indians	Sooner State League	Don Smith and James Cooke
D	Green Bay Blue Jays	Wisconsin State League	Roxie Lawson, Walt Laskowski and Joe Dotlich

LEAGUE CHAMPIONS: Dayton, Union City
