= Lyman Linde =

American baseball player (1920–1995)

- Pitcher
- Born: September 30, 1920; Rolling Prairie, Wisconsin, U.S.
- Died: October 24, 1995 (aged 75); Beaver Dam, Wisconsin, U.S.
- Batted: Right Threw: Right

MLB debut
- September 11, 1947, for the Cleveland Indians

Last MLB appearance
- May 9, 1948, for the Cleveland Indians

MLB statistics
- Games played: 4
- Innings pitched: 10.2
- Earned run average: 6.75
- Stats at Baseball Reference

Teams
- Cleveland Indians (1947–1948)

Lyman Gilbert Linde (September 30, 1920 – October 24, 1995) was an American right-handed pitcher in Major League Baseball who played for the Cleveland Indians in the American League for two seasons. In four career games, Linde pitched 10 2/3 innings and had a 6.75 earned run average (ERA).

Born and raised in Wisconsin, Linde first played professionally with the Green Bay Bluejays. After a season with them, he enlisted in the armed forces for World War II, and joined the Greenville Spinners upon his return to baseball. During the next two seasons he spent some time with the Cleveland Indians, but mainly remained with the Indians' minor league teams. After a year each in Oklahoma City, Baltimore, and San Diego, he spent the last four years of his career pitching for the Portland Beavers. He retired at the end of the 1953 season and died in 1995.

== Early life ==
Linde attended high school at Beaver Dam High School in Beaver Dam, Wisconsin. While there, he played basketball as well as baseball, and was part of the state champion Beaver Dam High School basketball team in 1937. After graduating, he played amateur baseball in Wisconsin for several years. In a state amateur baseball tournament in 1941, Linde, representing the Beaver Dam Beavers, pitched a one-hitter to help lead his team to a 9–1 win over the representatives from Fond du Lac County, Wisconsin. Linde attended the University of Wisconsin-Madison on and off between 1939 and 1947.

== Minor leagues ==
Linde's first taste of minor league action came in 1942, when he signed with the Green Bay Bluejays of the Wisconsin State League. His performances that season included a near-no-hitter that was lost in the ninth inning in a 5–2 victory over the Fond du Lac Panthers. Linde was also given the most valuable player award for a week in July after a pitching performance, also against Fond du Lac, in which he struck out 14 batters in a 5–0 shutout victory. He finished the season with 13 wins, eight losses, and a 2.91 ERA in 22 pitching appearances. After the season ended, the league folded temporarily, and Linde enlisted with the United States Army Air Forces to serve in World War II.

After returning from military service, Linde joined the Greenville Spinners, the Chicago White Sox minor league affiliate of the Sally League. He tried out for the Milwaukee Brewers, but was unable to make the team, and as a result was sent to Greenville to gain experience. Linde pitched in 29 games for the Spinners. In those 29 games, he had ten wins, eight losses, a 3.50 ERA, and 121 innings pitched. After the conclusion of the season, in early November, Linde was drafted by the Cleveland Indians in the rule 5 draft.

The following season, Linde pitched for the Oklahoma City Indians, the Indians minor league affiliate of the Texas League. He spent most of the season with Oklahoma City, and in a pitching appearance in August, threw a no-hitter and narrowly missed pitching a perfect game. In 32 appearances for Oklahoma City, Linde won 14 games, lost 13, and had an ERA of 2.85 in 202 innings pitched. At the end of the minor league season, Linde was called up to the Indians' major league roster along with Ernest Groth in order to build up the end of the bullpen.

== Cleveland Indians and Portland ==
Linde made his major league debut with the Indians on September 11, 1947, which ended up being his only appearance of the season. In that one appearance, he pitched 2/3 of an inning and allowed two earned run, finishing the game and season with an ERA of 27.00. During the off-season, Linde played basketball with the Olo Soaps, a team located in his native Beaver Dam. He took part in spring training with the rest of the Indians roster for the 1948 Cleveland Indians season. In late March, however, he was struck on the chin from a line drive hit by Indians manager Lou Boudreau, causing him to be sidelined for several days. By the end of spring training, Linde remained a part of the Indians roster. He pitched three games for the Indians early on in 1948, pitching ten innings, allowing six earned runs and finishing the season with a 5.40 ERA. After three games, he was demoted to the Baltimore Orioles of the International League. He spent the rest of the 1948 season as a starting pitcher for Baltimore. His performances included a one-hit victory in his first appearance for the club. Linde finished the season with a 5–9 record and a 4.50 ERA.

Linde spent 1949 with the San Diego Padres of the Pacific Coast League (PCL). He tried to earn a spot with the Indians during spring training but was unable to. He spent the season as a starting pitcher for San Diego, and threw three shutouts over the course of the season, allowing only three hits to the Los Angeles Angels in his third one. He finished the season with a 14–15 record in 35 pitching appearances (32 starts), a 4.41 ERA, 105 strikeouts, and 226 1/3 innings pitched. He brought the Padres to the playoffs, and pitched in game six of the championship against the Hollywood Stars, where he earned the 8–4 loss as the Stars won the PCL pennant and the Governors' Cup.

At the start of the 1950 season, Linde signed a new contract with the Indians, but was released in February and sent to the Portland Beavers in the PCL. Over the course of the season, Linde won 5 games and lost 13 in 47 appearances, 18 of them starts, and amassed an ERA of 4.66. The following year, in 1951, Linde became a regular starter on the team, and before the end of April he had won as many games as he had won all of last year. He finished the season with a 12–12 record and a 4.29 ERA in 32 starts. In 1952, Linde remained part of the core starting rotation of the past couple years alongside Red Adams and Marino Pieretti. His performances included one against the Angels in which Linde kept the team to five hits as the Beavers won 4–3 in 11 innings. He won 11 games, lost 15, threw 119 strikeouts, and brought his ERA down to 3.10 in 41 season appearances, 28 of them starts. In 1953, Linde started the season strong unlike his fellow pitchers, opening his season with a 2–1 victory against the Angels on April 3. In early May, he ended Ted Beard's streak of hitting safely in 12 straight at-bats, which tied the PCL record at the time. Shortly afterward, Linde won what was considered an odd performance as he allowed 15 hits and 20 runners on base, yet won a game against the Sacramento Solons 8–3. In his final professional season, Linde pitched in 36 games and finished with a 13–10 record and a 3.36 ERA.

== Later life ==
After the 1953 season, Linde retired from baseball to tend to his wife, who was seriously ill. He died in Beaver Dam on October 24, 1995.
