= Jim Goodwin (baseball) =

American baseball player (1926–2008)

- Pitcher
- Born: August 15, 1926; St. Louis, Missouri, U.S.
- Died: April 12, 2008 (aged 81); St. Louis, Missouri, U.S.
- Batted: Left Threw: Left

MLB debut
- April 24, 1948, for the Chicago White Sox

Last MLB appearance
- May 30, 1948, for the Chicago White Sox

MLB statistics
- Win–loss record: 0–0
- Earned run average: 8.71
- Strikeouts: 3
- Stats at Baseball Reference

Teams
- Chicago White Sox (1948)

James Patrick Goodwin (August 15, 1926 – April 12, 2008) was an American pitcher in Major League Baseball. Listed at 6 ft 1 in (1.85 m), 170 lb (77 kg), he batted and threw left-handed.

Born in St. Louis, Missouri, Goodwin started his professional career with the New York Giants organization, playing for them in their Minor league system with the Springfield (1943) and Jersey City (1944) teams, by then the top farm system affiliates of the Giants. But his baseball career was interrupted after he entered service in the United States Army during World War II.

Following his discharge, he rejoined Jersey City in 1946, being obtained a year later by the Chicago White Sox from the Giants in the Rule 5 draft.

Goodwin joined the White Sox on April 24, 1948. He made eight pitching appearances (one start) and posted an 8.71 earned run average, giving up 11 runs (10 earned) on nine hits and 12 walks while striking out three in 10⅓ innings of work. He did not have a decision and made his last appearance on May 30 of that year.

In addition, he pitched six seasons in the minors between 1944 and 1950, compiling a 50–38 record and a 3.36 ERA in 162 games.

Goodwin died in St. Louis, Missouri, at the age of 81.

== See also ==
- 1948 Chicago White Sox season
