= Gus Niarhos =

American baseball player (1920–2004)

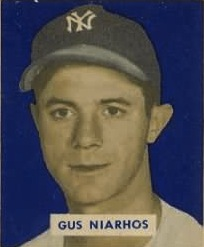
- Niarhos' 1949 Bowman Gum baseball card
- Catcher
- Born: December 6, 1920; Birmingham, Alabama, U.S.
- Died: December 29, 2004 (aged 84); Harrisonburg, Virginia, U.S.
- Batted: Right Threw: Right

MLB debut
- June 9, 1946, for the New York Yankees

Last MLB appearance
- September 9, 1955, for the Philadelphia Phillies

MLB statistics
- Batting average: .252
- Home runs: 1
- Runs batted in: 59
- Stats at Baseball Reference

Teams
- New York Yankees (1946, 1948–1950); Chicago White Sox (1950–1951); Boston Red Sox (1952–1953); Philadelphia Phillies (1954–1955)

Career highlights and awards
- World Series champion (1949)

Constantine Gregory "Gus" Niarhos (December 6, 1920 – December 29, 2004) was an American professional baseball player. He played in Major League Baseball as a catcher for the New York Yankees (1946, 1948–50), Chicago White Sox (1950–51), Boston Red Sox (1952–53) and Philadelphia Phillies (1954–55). Niarhos batted and threw right-handed, stood 6 feet (1.8 m) tall and weighed 160 pounds (73 kg).

== Baseball playing career ==
A native of Birmingham, Alabama, Niarhos attended West End High School and signed a contract with the New York Yankees as an amateur free agent in 1941. He began his professional baseball career with the Akron Yankees at the age of 20. Niarhos posted a .306 batting average in 112 games, to help Akron win the 1941 Middle Atlantic League pennant. In 1942 he moved up to the Binghamton Triplets of the Eastern League where he hit for a .278 average. Niarhos joined the United States Navy in 1943 and, was stationed at Quonset Point Naval Air Station in Rhode Island.

After the Second World War ended, Niarhos returned to the Yankees organisation in 1946, playing for Kansas City Blues of the American Association. He made his major league debut with the Yankees on June 9, 1946 at the age of 25. Niarhos returned to the minor leagues in 1947 where he hit for a .321 batting average in 93 games for Kansas City, prompting Blues manager Billy Meyer to describe him as, "the best catcher in the organisation." This was high praise in an organisation that included future catching standouts such as Yogi Berra, Sherm Lollar and Aaron Robinson.

Niarhos returned to the major leagues in 1948, when he caught the majority of the Yankees games while Berra split time between playing the outfield and catching. In his first full season with the Yankees, Niarhos led the team with a .404 on-base percentage and had a respectable .990 fielding percentage. On September 26, he suffered a fractured bone in his right hand which ended his season. Niarhos began the 1949 season as the Yankees starting catcher however, by the end of the year, Berra had taken over the job as, the Yankees went on to win the American League pennant. In what would be the only post-season appearance of his career, Niarhos played in only one game of the 1949 World Series as a late-inning defensive replacement.

On June 27, 1950, the Chicago White Sox claimed Niarhos for the waiver price of $10,000 ($133,817 in current dollar terms). He had a .324 batting average with a .408 on-base percentage in 41 games with the White Sox. He served as a reserve catcher behind Phil Masi in the 1951 season before being traded to the St. Louis Browns for Sherm Lollar at the end of the year. One day later, the Browns traded him to the Boston Red Sox in exchange for catcher Les Moss. He spent two seasons as a reserve catcher for the Red Sox before ending his major league playing career with the Philadelphia Phillies. He was released after the 1955 season, having appeared in only 10 games over two seasons with the Phillies. Niarhos played for three more seasons in the minor leagues before retiring as a player in 1958 at the age of 37.

== Career statistics ==
In a nine-season career, Niarhos played in 315 games, accumulating 174 hits in 691 at bats for a .252 career batting average along with 1 home run and 59 runs batted in. He ended his career with a .988 fielding percentage.

== Managing and coaching career ==
Following his playing career, Niarhos was a coach for the Kansas City Athletics from 1962 to mid-1964. He then became a minor league manager, leading the Burlington Bees to the 1965 Midwest League championship and then, the Modesto Reds to the 1966 California League championship. As a manager in the Athletics minor league system, he coached future stars such as Reggie Jackson, Vida Blue, Rollie Fingers, Tony La Russa, Gene Tenace and Catfish Hunter. He later returned to his hometown of Birmingham to manage the Birmingham A's.

Niarhos died in Harrisonburg, Virginia at the age of 84.
