= Neill Sheridan =

American baseball player (1921–2015)

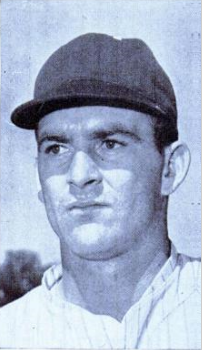
- Pinch runner / Pinch hitter
- Born: November 20, 1921; Sacramento, California, U.S.
- Died: October 15, 2015 (aged 93); Antioch, California, U.S.
- Batted: Right Threw: Right

MLB debut
- September 19, 1948, for the Boston Red Sox

Last MLB appearance
- September 26, 1948, for the Boston Red Sox

MLB statistics
- At bats: 1
- Runs scored: 0
- Hits: 0
- Stats at Baseball Reference

Teams
- Boston Red Sox (1948)

Neill Rawlins Sheridan (November 20, 1921 – October 15, 2015), nicknamed "Wild Horse," was an American professional baseball player whose 12-season career (1943–1954) largely took place in the minor leagues. An outfielder by trade, he saw his only Major League service for the 1948 Boston Red Sox, appearing for a cup of coffee (only two games played) — one as a pinch hitter and one as a pinch runner. Born in Sacramento, California, Sheridan threw and batted right-handed; he stood 6 feet 1 inch (1.85 m) tall and weighed 195 pounds (88 kg).

On September 19, 1948, with Boston embroiled in a four-team pennant scramble, Sheridan appeared as a pinch runner for Bobby Doerr (a future Hall of Famer), in the sixth inning of an 8–6 loss to the Detroit Tigers at Briggs Stadium. One week later, he logged his only MLB at bat when he pinch hit in the ninth inning for pitcher Dave Ferriss at Yankee Stadium during a 6–2 Red Sox defeat. Facing New York Yankees' left-hander Tommy Byrne, Sheridan was called out on strikes. His Major League Baseball trial came to an end after those two games.

As a minor leaguer, however, Sheridan appeared in 1,446 games and was a mainstay of the post-World War II Pacific Coast League. He wore the uniform of five PCL teams, including both clubs in his native San Francisco Bay Area, the San Francisco Seals and the Oakland Oaks.

Sheridan died of pneumonia on October 15, 2015, in Antioch, California, aged 93.
