= Earle Brucker Sr. =

Earle Brucker
- Catcher
- Born: May 6, 1901; Albany, New York, U.S.
- Died: May 8, 1981 (aged 80); San Diego, California, U.S.
- Batted: Right Threw: Right

MLB debut
- April 19, 1937, for the Philadelphia Athletics

Last MLB appearance
- May 23, 1943, for the Philadelphia Athletics

MLB statistics
- Batting average: .290
- Home runs: 12
- Runs batted in: 105
- Stats at Baseball Reference

Teams
- Philadelphia Athletics (1937–1940, 1943)

Earle Francis Brucker Sr. (May 6, 1901 – May 8, 1981) was an American catcher, coach and interim manager in Major League Baseball. After a long minor league career in the Pacific Coast and Western leagues – and after missing three full seasons (1927–29) in his prime due to arm trouble – Brucker was an unusually old rookie player in the Major Leagues. He made his debut on April 19, 1937, seventeen days shy of his 36th birthday.

A longtime San Diego resident who was born in Albany, New York, Brucker threw and batted right-handed, stood 5 ft 11 in (1.80 m) (180 cm) tall and weighed 175 pounds (79 kg). He made his first appearance in professional baseball in 1924 for the Seattle Indians of the Pacific Coast League, but it would be 13 years before he would reach the majors. He was even a playing manager in the Western League during this apprenticeship.

He played his entire MLB career (1937–40; 1943) for the Philadelphia Athletics and served as a player-coach or coach under legendary A's manager Connie Mack for nine full seasons, 1941–49. In 241 total games, he batted .290 in 707 at bats, with 12 home runs and 105 runs batted in. In 1938, his best campaign, Brucker batted .374 with 64 hits in 171 at bats, three homers and 35 RBI. During his long tenure with Philadelphia, he also witnessed the brief major-league career of his son Earle Jr., also a catcher, who appeared in two games for the Athletics at the end of the 1948 season.

After leaving the A's, Brucker Sr. coached for the St. Louis Browns (1950) and the Cincinnati Reds (1952). During the latter season, from July 30 to August 3, he served as interim manager of the Reds for five games during the transition when Luke Sewell was replaced by Rogers Hornsby. Brucker's sixth-place Reds won three of five during his brief tenure. Following that season, Brucker managed in the Cincinnati farm system for two additional campaigns before leaving the game.

In 1960, Brucker was also inducted by the San Diego Hall of Champions into the Breitbard Hall of Fame honoring San Diego's finest athletes both on and off the playing surface. Brucker died in San Diego, at age 80.
