= Charley Wensloff =

American baseball player (1915–2001)

- Pitcher
- Born: December 3, 1915; Sausalito, California, U.S.
- Died: February 18, 2001 (aged 85); San Rafael, California, U.S.
- Batted: Right Threw: Right

MLB debut
- May 2, 1943, for the New York Yankees

Last MLB appearance
- May 4, 1948, for the Cleveland Indians

MLB statistics
- Win–loss record: 16–13
- Earned run average: 2.60
- Strikeouts: 125
- Stats at Baseball Reference

Teams
- New York Yankees (1943, 1947); Cleveland Indians (1948)

Career highlights and awards
- World Series champion (1947)

Charles William "Butch" Wensloff (December 3, 1915 – February 18, 2001) was an American right-handed pitcher in Major League Baseball who played for three seasons in the American League with the New York Yankees and Cleveland Indians. In 41 career games, Wensloff pitched 276 2/3 innings and posted a win–loss record of 16–13 and a 2.60 earned run average (ERA).

Wensloff began his career in the Arizona–Texas League before joining the New York Yankees farm system. He played on various minor league teams for the next six seasons and made his debut during the 1943 New York Yankees season. He pitched in 29 games, and after the season ended, he served in the United States Army during World War II. Wensloff rejoined the Yankees in 1947, pitching in 11 regular-season games and in the 1947 World Series. After the season ended, he was sent to the Cleveland Indians and pitched in one game for the team before retiring at the end of the season.

== Minor leagues ==
Wensloff began his professional career in the Arizona–Texas League, pitching for the Class-D, El Paso Texans, a team not affiliated with any major league squad, in 1937. The team included future Major League players Bill Bevens and Milo Candini, and one former Major League player, Jimmy Zinn. Wensloff pitched 34 games that season, going 17–10 with a 4.67 ERA in 233 innings pitched. At the end of the season, he was the third most successful pitcher in the league in terms of wins and pitched in the eighth highest number of innings.

In 1938, Wensloff spent his first season in the New York Yankees minor league system, playing for the Class-C Joplin Miners of the Western Association. In an exhibition game with the Miners against the St. Louis Browns, Wensloff allowed eight runs and failed to pitch for a full inning as the Miners lost, 12–5. In 28 games for the Miners in 1938, he won and lost 13 games each and finished the season with a 3.48 ERA. Wensloff continued his tenure with the Miners during the 1939 season. By the end of July, he had a win–loss record of 17–2. In his final season at the Class-C level, Wensloff compiled a 26–4 record in 31 games, pitching 249 innings. At the end of the season, Wensloff had the most wins in the league along with Maury Newlin of the Topeka Owls, and was also third in the league in innings pitched.

In 1940, Wensloff was promoted to the Kansas City Blues of the American Association, a higher level of the Yankees' farm system, where he played alongside Hall of Famer Phil Rizzuto, among others who later played in the majors. In his first game at the Double-A level, Wensloff allowed only two hits in a game against the Columbus Red Birds. Wensloff pitched in 35 games, 27 starts, going 13–8 with a 3.19 ERA in 178 innings pitched. The Blues went on to play in the American Association playoffs that season. In the second game of three against the Louisville Colonels, Wensloff shut them out as the Blues won the game, 1–0. Wensloff spent his second season with the Blues in 1941, and went 15–8 with a 3.93 ERA in 36 games, 22 of them starts. He finished the season eighth in the American Association in wins.

Wensloff played his third and final season with the Blues in 1942. That season, he was one of five pitchers named to the American Association All-Star Team, which Kansas City hosted. Wensloff won his 19th game of the season on August 24, 1942, pitching the shortest game of the season, which only lasted one hour and 20 minutes. Wensloff had a 21–10 record with a 2.47 ERA in 33 games, had the most wins in the league, and was sixth in ERA during that season. On September 27, 1942, the New York Yankees purchased nine contracts from their minor league teams, including Herb Karpel and Wensloff's contracts from Kansas City, which placed them on the major league roster.

== New York Yankees ==
"Off to a poor start, Wensloff has come along in grand style. His present record is 10 wins and seven losses but included in his bag are five games in which he limited the opposition to five hits and five games in which he limited the enemy to six blows per game."

— Beaver County Times: September 1, 1943

Upon signing a contract with the Yankees, Wensloff spent the 1943 season on the Yankees' major league roster. During spring training, Yankees manager Joe McCarthy had heard impressive things about Wensloff, though he had not seen him pitch often. Wensloff made his major league debut for the Yankees on May 2, 1943, against the Washington Senators. In his debut, the second game of a doubleheader, he allowed four earned runs and seven hits in eight innings as the Yankees lost, 4–1. He won his first game in his next pitching appearance on May 7, 1943, against the Philadelphia Athletics, allowing no walks and six hits in a 6–2 victory. By the end of June, he had six complete games in his first six starts. However, he was not receiving the publicity other rookies were, such as pitcher Jesse Flores, and had four wins and four losses despite how well he had been pitching.

During the second half of the season, Wensloff remained a major part of the starting rotation. His losses included a 1–0 defeat in which he only allowed one unearned run on a wild throw against the St. Louis Browns. During the season, Wensloff added a knuckleball to his selection of pitches, which he threw regularly during the season. As the end of the season approached, Wensloff was being promoted as a rookie of the year candidate, due to being second on the team in strikeouts, as well as his 13 wins. Wensloff finished the season with a 13–11 record and a 2.54 ERA in 29 games, 27 of them starts. He did not pitch in the 1943 World Series, though he was on the roster.

== Military service ==
At the conclusion of the 1943 season, Wensloff enlisted in the United States Army and served in World War II. When the Yankees were preparing for the start of the 1944 season, the team originally had no idea where Wensloff was, as they had not heard from him. He was inactive for the 1944 season. In 1945, Wensloff was traded from the Yankees to the San Diego Padres of the Pacific Coast League for Johnny Kreevich, allowing him to simultaneously pitch professionally and continue serving in the war. In 10 games for the Padres, he won three and lost four with a 3.82 ERA. After the 1945 season and the war ended, Wensloff remained in military service, and as a result did not play in 1946.

== Later career ==
After his service, Wensloff returned to the New York Yankees for the 1947 season. He made his first appearance at the start of June and pitched despite having a sore arm throughout the season, pitching infrequently. In 11 games with the Yankees, Wensloff compiled a record of 3–1 with a 2.61 ERA and 18 strikeouts in 51 2/3 innings pitched, and pitched two innings of one game in the 1947 World Series.

As the 1948 season began, Wensloff did not report to spring training, and was holding out for a new contract; the only time he communicated with the club was to inquire about his World Series ring. At the end of March, he was sold by the Yankees to the Philadelphia Phillies for a reported $30,000. Wensloff refused to join the Phillies because he did not want to play in the National League, and as a result he was sent back to the Yankees. The Yankees were also in trade talks with the New York Giants, but Wensloff refused to play for them for the same reason. The Yankees continued to look for a trading partner, and eventually traded him to the Cleveland Indians for an undisclosed amount. With the Indians, Wensloff pitched only one game, giving up two earned runs in 1 2/3 innings pitched on May 4. He was placed on the disabled list on May 20, 1948, with continued arm soreness. This later proved to be a career-ending injury for Wensloff, as he retired at the end of the 1948 season. As part of the deal with Cleveland, Indians' prospect Al Rosen was loaned to the Yankees' Kansas City Blues farm team for the duration of the 1948 season.

Upon ending his career, Wensloff retired to San Rafael, California, and died on February 18, 2001.
