= Mike Palm (baseball) =

American baseball player (1925–2011)

- Pitcher
- Born: February 13, 1925; Boston, Massachusetts, U.S.
- Died: July 24, 2011 (aged 86); Scituate, Massachusetts, U.S.
- Batted: Right Threw: Right

MLB debut
- July 11, 1948, for the Boston Red Sox

Last MLB appearance
- July 21, 1948, for the Boston Red Sox

MLB statistics
- Win–loss record: 0–0
- Earned run average: 6.00
- Strikeouts: 1
- Stats at Baseball Reference

Teams
- Boston Red Sox (1948)

Mike Palm (February 13, 1925 – July 24, 2011) was an American professional baseball player. He was a relief pitcher in Major League Baseball who played briefly for the Boston Red Sox during the 1948 season. Listed at 6' 3", 190 lb., he batted and threw right-handed.

Born in Boston, Massachusetts, Palm is one of relatively few Red Sox players to have been born in the city of Boston. He was christened Richard Paul, but later legally changed his name to Mike.

Following his discharge after serving in World War II, Palm pitched in the minor leagues from 1946 to 1948 before joining the Red Sox late in 1948. In three relief appearances, he posted a 6.00 earned run average with one strikeout and five walks in 3.0 innings of work. He did not have a decision or saves.

Palm later played three years in the minors, retiring in 1951. In a seven-season career, he had a 54–43 record and a 3.75 ERA in 152 pitching appearances.

After leaving baseball, Palm started a career in the printing business working for several different firms until he started his own corporation, Palm Associates, where he worked until his retirement in the 1990s. In 2011, he was inducted into the Belmont High School Hall of Fame for his outstanding pitching record and performance while playing baseball, averaging 18 strikeouts per game. He also was the recipient of many awards his senior year including the Boston Post All Scholastic Award in 1943, one of the highest honors given in high school baseball at the time.

Palm was a long-time resident of Scituate, Massachusetts, where he died at the age of 86.

== See also ==
- 1948 Boston Red Sox season
