= 1948 Detroit Tigers season =

Major League Baseball season

1948 Detroit Tigers
- League: American League
- Ballpark: Briggs Stadium
- City: Detroit, Michigan
- Record: 78–76 (.506)
- League place: 5th
- Owners: Walter Briggs, Sr.
- General managers: Billy Evans
- Managers: Steve O'Neill
- Television: WWJ (Harry Heilmann, Paul Williams, Ty Tyson)
- Radio: WJLB (Harry Heilmann, Harry Wismer, Ty Tyson)

The 1948 Detroit Tigers season was a season in American baseball. The team finished fifth in the American League with a record of 78–76, 18½ games behind the Cleveland Indians.

== Regular season ==
=== Season standings ===
American League
Team	W	L	Pct.	GB	Home	Road
Cleveland Indians	97	58	.626	—	48‍–‍30	49‍–‍28
Boston Red Sox	96	59	.619	1	55‍–‍23	41‍–‍36
New York Yankees	94	60	.610	2½	50‍–‍27	44‍–‍33
Philadelphia Athletics	84	70	.545	12½	36‍–‍41	48‍–‍29
Detroit Tigers	78	76	.506	18½	39‍–‍38	39‍–‍38
St. Louis Browns	59	94	.386	37	34‍–‍42	25‍–‍52
Washington Senators	56	97	.366	40	29‍–‍48	27‍–‍49
Chicago White Sox	51	101	.336	44½	27‍–‍48	24‍–‍53

=== Record vs. opponents ===
1948 American League record Sources:
Team	BOS	CWS	CLE	DET	NYY	PHA	SLB	WSH
Boston	—	14–8	11–12	15–7	14–8	12–10	15–7	15–7
Chicago	8–14	—	6–16	8–14	6–16	6–16	8–13–1	9–12–1
Cleveland	12–11	16–6	—	13–9	10–12	16–6	14–8–1	16–6
Detroit	7–15	14–8	9–13	—	9–13	12–10	11–11	16–6
New York	8–14	16–6	12–10	13–9	—	12–10	16–6	17–5
Philadelphia	10–12	16–6	6–16	10–12	10–12	—	18–4	14–8
St. Louis	7–15	13–8–1	8–14–1	11–11	6–16	4–18	—	10–12
Washington	7–15	12–9–1	6–16	6–16	5–17	8–14	12–10	—

=== Roster ===
1948 Detroit Tigers
Roster
Pitchers: 19 Al Benton; 24 Rufe Gentry; 30 Ted Gray; 21,15 Art Houtteman; 29 Fred Hutchinson; 30 Lou Kretlow; 16 Hal Newhouser; 18 Stubby Overmire; 10 Billy Pierce; 11 Dizzy Trout; 22 Virgil Trucks; 17 Hal White	Catchers: 1 Joe Ginsberg; 25 Hank Riebe; 9 Bob Swift; 1 Hal Wagner; Infielders: 28 Johnny Bero; 36 Neil Berry; 2 Paul Campbell; 15,21 George Kell; 7 Eddie Lake; 25,26 Johnny Lipon; 3,9 Eddie Mayo; 27 Jimmy Outlaw; 5 George Vico	Outfielders: 8 Doc Cramer; 14 Hoot Evers; 3 Johnny Groth; 12 Ed Mierkowicz; 6 Pat Mullin; 4 Dick Wakefield; 20 Vic Wertz; Other batters: 23 John McHale	Manager: 32 Steve O'Neill; Coaches: 8 Doc Cramer; 31 Art Mills; 33 Bill Sweeney

== Player stats ==
=== Batting ===
==== Starters by position ====
Note: Pos = Position; G = Games played; AB = At bats; H = Hits; Avg. = Batting average; HR = Home runs; RBI = Runs batted in

Pos	Player	G	AB	H	Avg.	HR	RBI
C	Bob Swift	113	292	65	.223	4	33
1B	Sam Vico	144	521	139	.267	8	58
2B	Eddie Mayo	106	370	92	.249	2	42
SS	Johnny Lipon	121	458	133	.290	5	52
3B	George Kell	92	368	112	.304	2	44
OF	Hoot Evers	139	538	169	.314	10	103
OF	Vic Wertz	119	391	97	.248	7	67
OF	Pat Mullin	138	496	143	.288	23	80

==== Other batters ====
Note: G = Games played; AB = At bats; H = Hits; Avg. = Batting average; HR = Home runs; RBI = Runs batted in

Player	G	AB	H	Avg.	HR	RBI
Dick Wakefield	110	322	89	.276	11	53
Neil Berry	87	256	68	.266	0	16
Eddie Lake	64	198	52	.263	2	18
Jimmy Outlaw	74	198	56	.283	0	25
Hal Wagner	54	109	22	.202	0	10
Paul Campbell	59	83	22	.265	1	11
Hank Riebe	25	62	12	.194	0	5
Joe Ginsberg	11	36	13	.361	0	1
Johnny Groth	6	17	8	.471	1	5
Johnny Bero	4	9	0	.000	0	0
Ed Mierkowicz	3	5	1	.200	0	1
Doc Cramer	4	4	0	.000	0	1
John McHale	1	1	0	.000	0	0

=== Pitching ===
==== Starting pitchers ====
Note: G = Games pitched; IP = Innings pitched; W = Wins; L = Losses; ERA = Earned run average; SO = Strikeouts

Player	G	IP	W	L	ERA	SO
Hal Newhouser	39	272.1	21	12	3.01	143
Fred Hutchinson	33	221.0	13	11	4.32	92
Dizzy Trout	32	183.2	10	14	3.43	91

==== Other pitchers ====
Note: G = Games pitched; IP = Innings pitched; W = Wins; L = Losses; ERA = Earned run average; SO = Strikeouts

Player	G	IP	W	L	ERA	SO
Virgil Trucks	43	211.2	14	13	3.78	123
Art Houtteman	43	164.1	2	16	4.66	74
Ted Gray	26	85.1	6	2	4.22	60
Billy Pierce	22	55.1	3	0	6.34	36
Lou Kretlow	5	23.1	2	1	4.63	9

==== Relief pitchers ====
Note: G = Games pitched; W = Wins; L = Losses; SV = Saves; ERA = Earned run average; SO = Strikeouts

Player	G	W	L	SV	ERA	SO
Stubby Overmire	37	3	4	3	5.97	14
Al Benton	30	2	2	3	5.68	18
Hal White	27	2	1	1	6.12	17
Rufe Gentry	4	0	0	0	2.70	1

== Farm system ==
Level	Team	League	Manager
AAA	Buffalo Bisons	International League	Paul Richards
AAA	Seattle Rainiers	Pacific Coast League	Jo-Jo White
AA	Little Rock Travelers	Southern Association	Jack Saltzgaver
A	Flint Arrows	Central League	Jack Tighe
A	Williamsport Tigers	Eastern League	Gene Desautels
B	Hagerstown Owls	Interstate League	Pep Rambert, Gene Crumling and Benny Culp
C	Rome Colonels	Canadian–American League	Clyde Smoll
C	Durham Bulls	Carolina League	Willie Duke
D	Troy Trojans	Alabama State League	Bob Benish
D	Thomasville Tigers	Georgia–Florida League	Bob Engle
D	Jamestown Falcons	PONY League	Marv Olson
D	Clinton Blues	Tobacco State League	Marv Lorenz
