= Don White (baseball) =

American baseball player (1919-1987)

- Outfielder
- Born: January 8, 1919; Everett, Washington, U.S.
- Died: June 15, 1987 (aged 68); Carlsbad, California, U.S.
- Batted: Right Threw: Right

MLB debut
- April 19, 1948, for the Philadelphia Athletics

Last MLB appearance
- October 2, 1949, for the Philadelphia Athletics

MLB statistics
- Batting average: .232
- Hits: 98
- Runs batted in: 38
- Stats at Baseball Reference

Teams
- Philadelphia Athletics (1948–1949)

Donald William White (January 8, 1919 – June 15, 1987) was an American Major League Baseball outfielder who played for two seasons. He played for the Philadelphia Athletics from 1948 to 1949, playing in 143 career games.
