= Glen Moulder =

American baseball player (1917–1994)

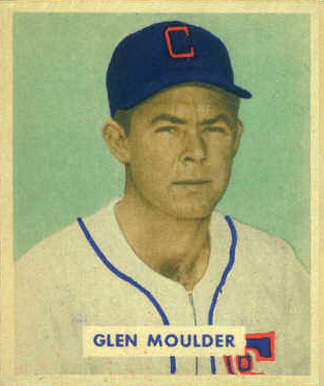
- Pitcher
- Born: September 28, 1917; Cleveland, Oklahoma, U.S.
- Died: November 27, 1994 (aged 77); Decatur, Georgia, U.S.
- Batted: Right Threw: Right

MLB debut
- April 28, 1946, for the Brooklyn Dodgers

Last MLB appearance
- September 18, 1948, for the Chicago White Sox

MLB statistics
- Win–loss record: 7–8
- Earned run average: 5.21
- Strikeouts: 50
- Stats at Baseball Reference

Teams
- Brooklyn Dodgers (1946); St. Louis Browns (1947); Chicago White Sox (1948)

Glen Hubert Moulder (September 28, 1917 – November 27, 1994) was an American professional baseball pitcher who appeared in 66 games in Major League Baseball with the Brooklyn Dodgers (1946), St. Louis Browns (1947) and Chicago White Sox (1948). Moulder batted and threw right-handed, stood 6 feet (1.8 m) tall and weighed 180 pounds (82 kg). He was born in Cleveland, Oklahoma.

Moulder began his pro career in the Brooklyn organization in the Class D Nebraska State League in 1937. By 1942, six years into his career, he had progressed as far as the Class B Piedmont League. He then performed World War II service in the United States Army Air Forces, and missed the 1943–1945 seasons.

In 1946, the first postwar season, Moulder appeared in his first MLB game on April 28, for the Dodgers against the archival New York Giants in the second game of a doubleheader at the Polo Grounds. He came into the game in relief in the seventh inning with the Giants leading, 9–3. He worked two innings, and allowed two hits and one run on a home run to Buddy Blattner. He spent the balance of 1946 with the Triple-A Montreal Royals, who won the International League and Junior World Series championships led by Jackie Robinson in his historic first season in previously-all-white Organized Baseball.

Moulder then spent two full seasons in the American League, working in 32 games for the St. Louis Browns in 1947 and 33 contests for the Chicago White Sox in 1948. Moulder then returned to the minor leagues from 1949 through 1952 before leaving baseball. In his 66 MLB games, which included 11 starts, he posted a 7–8 won–lost record and a 5.21 earned run average. He had four saves, no complete games and no shutouts. In 1602/3 innings pitched, he allowed 188 hits and 98 bases on balls, with 50 strikeouts.

Glen Moulder died at age 77 in Decatur, Georgia, on November 27, 1994.
