= Ralph Schwamb =

American baseball player (1926–1989)

- Pitcher
- Born: August 6, 1926; Los Angeles, California
- Died: December 21, 1989 (aged 63); Lancaster, California
- Batted: Right Threw: Right

MLB debut
- July 25, 1948, for the St. Louis Browns

Last MLB appearance
- September 18, 1948, for the St. Louis Browns

MLB statistics
- Win–loss record: 1–1
- Earned run average: 8.53
- Strikeouts: 7
- Stats at Baseball Reference

Teams
- St. Louis Browns (1948)

Ralph Richard "Blackie" Schwamb (August 6, 1926 – December 21, 1989) was an American professional baseball pitcher and convicted murderer. He played for the St. Louis Browns of Major League Baseball in 1948. Listed at 6 feet 5 inches (1.96 m) and 198 pounds (90 kg), he threw and batted right-handed.

== Biography ==
Schwamb was nicknamed "Blackie" while in grade school, due to his habit of wearing black clothing, a practice he adopted after watching Western movies and seeing the "bad guys" wearing black. He served in the United States Navy during World War II, receiving a bad conduct discharge after hitting an officer.

=== Professional baseball career ===
Schwamb first played in the minor leagues from 1947 to 1949; initially in the Arizona–Texas League and Northern League (both Class C) and later the American Association (Triple-A) and Southern Association (Double-A). In 1948, Schwamb pitched in 12 major league games (five starts) for the St. Louis Browns, recording one win and one loss, while compiling an 8.53 earned run average (ERA). His lone win came in his second start, when he pitched 6 1/3 innings at home against the Washington Senators while allowing six runs (five earned) on eight hits, benefitting from his team scoring seven runs in the bottom of the sixth inning. Schwamb had three hits in 10 major league at bats and scored one run.

=== Murder conviction ===
After the 1948 season, Schwamb killed a doctor in Long Beach, California, named Donald Buge. Schwamb did it to pay off a debt to a Los Angeles mobster, Mickey Cohen. Schwamb was sentenced to life in prison in 1949, but was granted parole in 1960.

In 1961, Schwamb played a final season of minor league baseball for the Hawaii Islanders of the Pacific Coast League. Overall, in four seasons of professional baseball, Schwamb pitched in 62 games while compiling a 13–15 record with a 4.44 ERA. His life is the subject of a 2005 book entitled Wrong Side of the Wall.

In 1950, he played for the San Quentin All-Stars, a recreational baseball program for the prison’s inmates, and was a sensation. Eric Stone in his book, Wrong Side of the Wall: The Life of Blackie Schwamb, the Greatest Prison Baseball Player of All Time wrote:"Blackie was achieving the success he’d always wanted. The problem was that it was far from the limelight."When Schwamb was released at age 34, he pitched for the Hawaii Islanders of the Pacific Coast League in six games with a record of 1-2.
