= Earle Brucker Jr. =

American baseball player (1925-2009)

- Catcher
- Born: August 29, 1925; Los Angeles, California, U.S.
- Died: March 25, 2009 (aged 83); El Cajon, California, U.S.
- Batted: Left Threw: Right

MLB debut
- October 2, 1948, for the Philadelphia Athletics

Last MLB appearance
- October 3, 1948, for the Philadelphia Athletics

MLB statistics
- Batting average: .167
- Home runs: 0
- Runs batted in: 0
- Stats at Baseball Reference

Teams
- Philadelphia Athletics (1948)

Earle Francis Brucker Jr. (August 25, 1925 – March 28, 2009) was an American professional baseball player. He played two games as a catcher in Major League Baseball for the Philadelphia Athletics in 1948. After playing several seasons in minor league baseball, including a brief stint in the Pacific Coast League in 1953, he retired from baseball in 1955. He spent most of his life as the owner and operator of the Cajon Speedway in El Cajon, California.

Brucker was the son of Earle Brucker Sr., who played five seasons in the major leagues for the Athletics himself. When Earle Sr. joined the Athletics coaching staff in 1941, Earle Jr. was made the bullpen catcher at the age of 15.

Earle Sr. had gotten a 50-year lease on a property near Gillespie Airport, which he attempted to lease to the Detroit Tigers as a spring training facility. When they declined, he turned the property into a racetrack, fairgrounds, and high school football stadium. He turned the property over to Earle Jr. in 1958. One of his sons, Steve Brucker, took over the track but was murdered in 2003. With the death of Brucker and the speedway lease ending in 2005, the track shut down after the 2004 racing season.

Brucker died at his home in El Cajon on March 28, 2009.

== See also ==
- List of second-generation Major League Baseball players
