= George Binks =

American baseball player (1914-2010)

- Outfielder
- Born: July 11, 1914; Chicago, Illinois, U.S.
- Died: November 13, 2010 (aged 96); Woodbury, Tennessee, U.S.
- Batted: Left Threw: Left

MLB debut
- September 23, 1944, for the Washington Senators

Last MLB appearance
- July 3, 1948, for the St. Louis Browns

MLB statistics
- Batting average: .253
- Home runs: 8
- Runs batted in: 130
- Stats at Baseball Reference

Teams
- Washington Senators (1944–1946); Philadelphia Athletics (1947–1948); St. Louis Browns (1948)

George Alvin "Bingo" Binks (born Binkowski; July 11, 1914 – November 13, 2010) was an American professional baseball outfielder who played in Major League Baseball (MLB) for the Washington Senators, Philadelphia Athletics and St. Louis Browns. Born in Chicago, he threw and batted left-handed, stood 6 feet (1.8 m) tall and weighed 175 pounds (79 kg).

Binks' professional career began in 1936 at the Class D level of minor league baseball. After missing the wartime years of 1942–1943, he joined the 1944 Milwaukee Brewers of the top-level American Association and batted a lofty .374 in an even 100 games played. He reached the majors that September with the Senators, spending all or parts of three years (1944–1946) with them before moving to the Athletics of Connie Mack (1947–1948) and the Browns (1948). His most productive season came in 1945 with Washington, when he hit .278 with six home runs and 81 runs batted in in 145 games played, all career-highs.

Over five MLB seasons, Binks was a .253 hitter (277–for–1,093) with eight home runs and 130 RBI in 351 games, including 112 runs, 55 doubles, 10 triples, and 21 stolen bases. His professional baseball career ended in 1950 after 13 seasons.
