= Eddie Lopat =

American baseball player (1918–1992)

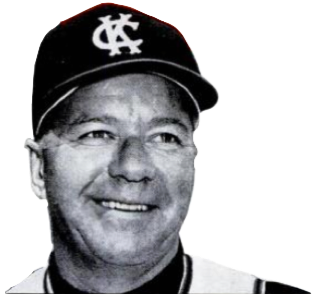
- Lopat in 1963 as manager of the Kansas City Athletics
- Pitcher / Manager
- Born: June 21, 1918; New York City, New York, U.S.
- Died: June 15, 1992 (aged 73); Darien, Connecticut, U.S.
- Batted: Left Threw: Left

MLB debut
- April 30, 1944, for the Chicago White Sox

Last MLB appearance
- September 23, 1955, for the Baltimore Orioles

MLB statistics
- Win–loss record: 166–112
- Earned run average: 3.21
- Strikeouts: 859
- Managerial record: 90–124
- Winning %: .421
- Stats at Baseball Reference

Teams
- As player: Chicago White Sox (1944–1947); New York Yankees (1948–1955); Baltimore Orioles (1955); As manager: Kansas City Athletics (1963–1964)

Career highlights and awards
- All-Star (1951); 5× World Series champion (1949–1953); AL ERA leader (1953)

Edmund Walter Lopat (originally Lopatynski) (June 21, 1918 – June 15, 1992) was an American Major League Baseball pitcher, coach, manager, front office executive, and scout. He was sometimes known as "the Junk Man", but better known as "Steady Eddie", a nickname later given to Eddie Murray. He was born in New York City.

== Early life ==
Lopat was born Edmund Walter Lopatynski on June 21, 1918, in New York City. He graduated from Dewitt Clinton High School in the Bronx in 1935. The school did not have a baseball team, and he played first base for the Music Hall team in the Theatrical League. In 1936, he tried out for the New York Giants without success, but the Brooklyn Dodgers sent him to their minor league affiliate in the Pennsylvania State Association for $50/month.

== Minor leagues ==
A 5 ft 10 in (1.78 m), 185 lb (84 kg) left-hander, Lopat was originally signed to play professional baseball by the Brooklyn Dodgers. He would play a total of seven years of minor league baseball before playing in the major leagues.

He began his professional baseball playing career in 1937, as a first baseman for the Greensburg Green Sox in the Class D Pennsylvania State Association. The next season, he was converted to a pitcher while playing for the Jeanerette Blues of the Evangeline League in Louisiana, where he had a 12–7 record.

In 1939, he led the East Texas League with a 2.11 earned run average (ERA), to go along with a 16–9 record, pitching for the Chicago White Sox affiliated Longview Cannibals. In 1940, he played for the Shreveport Sports of the Class-A1 Texas League, but with an ERA of 5.94 in 15 games. He also played that year for the Class C Marshall Tigers of the East Texas League, going 7–9, with a 3.45 ERA. In 1941, he was sent down to the Class D Salina Millers in the Western League, where he was 11–15, with a 3.84 ERA. However, in pitching for the Oklahoma City Indians of the Texas League that same year, he was 3–4, with a 1.76 ERA.

Again at Oklahoma City in 1942, Lopat was 6–7, with a 3.32 ERA. He also played part of the 1942 season, and all of his final (1943) minor league season in Class-A1 ball, with the Little Rock Travelers of the Southern Association. In 1942, he was 6–4, with a 2.44 ERA with the Travelers; and overall 12–11 with a 3.08 ERA for the year. Lopat's 1943 won—loss record improved considerably over the previous few years, with a 19–10 record, and he had a 3.05 ERA. In his most unusual baseball experience, Lopat pitched the opening game of a double header for the Travelers, and then was called on to serve as the first base umpire in the second game when the assigned umpire was overcome by the heat.

== Major league ==
=== Chicago White Sox ===
After seven minor league seasons, he was called up to the Chicago White Sox in 1944. Lopat made his major league pitching debut on April 30, 1944. During his four years with the White Sox (1944–47), the team never had a winning season. Despite the team's lack of success, Lopat's four year record was 50–49, with a 3.10 ERA. His best year with the White Sox came in 1947, when Lopat was 16–13 (on a team that won only 70 games) with a 2.81 ERA, while giving up only 73 bases on balls in 252.2 innings pitched. He was 31st in Most Valuable Player (MVP) voting that year.

=== New York Yankees ===
The near 30-year old Lopat was traded to the New York Yankees on February 24, 1948, for Aaron Robinson, Bill Wight, and Fred Bradley. From 1948 to 1953 he was the third of the "Big Three" of the Yankees' pitching staff, together with Allie Reynolds and Vic Raschi; and from 1949 to 1953, the Yankees won five consecutive World Series. During those five championship years, Lopat's regular season won–loss records were 15–10, 18–8, 21–9, 10–5 and 16–4, respectively. His annual ERAs were 3.26, 3.47, 2.91, 2.53 and 2.42, respectively.

Lopat pitched in the All-Star Game in 1951 for the American League. He led the American League in winning percentage and ERA in 1953, at 35 years old. In five World Series, he started seven games and had a 4–1 record, with a 2.60 ERA.

In his last full year with the Yankees (1954), he was 12–4, with a 3.55 ERA. Raschi was no longer with the team, and even though the Yankees won 103 games in a 154-game season, they were still eight games behind the first place Cleveland Indians in 1954. Reynolds retired after 1954, and by 1955, the Yankees had younger pitchers like future Hall of Famer Whitey Ford, Bob Turley and Tommy Byrne. The 37-year old Lopat was 4–8 with a 3.74 ERA on July 30, 1955, when he was traded to the Baltimore Orioles for Jim McDonald and cash. Lopat finished out the season with the Orioles, and retired.

=== Career ===
Over his 12-year AL career, Lopat won 166 games, losing 112 (.597) with an ERA of 3.21. He was also adept with the bat, compiling a .211 batting average with 5 home runs and 77 runs batted in during his career.

== Legacy ==
On June 4, 1951, the Cleveland Indians were so frustrated in not having defeated Lopat in almost two years, they held Beat Eddie Lopat Night (which they did).

In 1953, he led Eddie Lopat's All Stars on a baseball barnstorming tour of Japan. Among these all stars were future hall of famers Mickey Mantle, Yogi Berra, Robin Roberts, Eddie Mathews, Bob Lemon, Nellie Fox, and Enos Slaughter. Lopat himself had toured Japan with a group of players organized by Lefty O’Doul in 1951, inspiring his 1953 effort.

=== Pitching style ===
Lopat threw an assortment of pitches at different speeds, with the same motion, earning the nickname "The Junk Man". He was also known as "Steady Eddie".

Ned Garver described Lopat's pitching style, writing that he "changed speeds a lot and never really threw an exceptional fastball." Paul Richards, who managed Lopat briefly for the Orioles, said: "'Lopat throws his slow ball with the identical motion he throws his fastball, slider, screwball or any other pitch. Each looks the same as it leaves his hand, but it's the different speeds which keep the batter off balance.'"

Lopat was often successful against Hall of Fame hitting great Ted Williams, because he never threw the same pitch, nor to the same spot, twice. Still, while Williams hit less than his .344 lifetime batting average against Lopat, he did hit .316 in 79 at bats, with two home runs and 18 walks. By comparison, however, Williams hit .368 with six home runs and 28 walks against Reynolds; .413, with four home runs and 19 walks against Raschi; and .378, with five home runs in only 45 at bats, and 13 walks, against Ford.

== Coaching, managing and scouting career ==
Even while still playing for the Yankees, Lopat functioned as another pitching coach to teammates like Whitey Ford.

Lopat managed the Triple-A Richmond Virginians for the Yankees from 1956 to 1958, compiling a cumulative record of 226–234 with one playoff berth. He also played that first year in Richmond with an 11–6 record and 2.85 ERA, the only time he played above Class-A1 baseball in the minor leagues. Lopat then became a roving pitching coach in the Yankees' farm system in 1959. In 1960, he served one season as the Yankees' MLB pitching coach during Casey Stengel's final campaign as the club's manager. That year produced an American League pennant for the Yankees, but a defeat at the hands of the Pittsburgh Pirates in the World Series. Lopat was not rehired by Stengel's successor, Ralph Houk, but he stayed in the league as pitching coach of the Minnesota Twins in 1961 and the Kansas City Athletics in 1962.

Lopat was hired as a pitching coach in Kansas City by Hank Bauer, his former Yankees teammate. In 1963, Bauer was fired, and Lopat was tapped to manage the Athletics and continued in this role until June 11, 1964. His 1963 squad finished in eighth place, registering one more victory than it had in 1962. But his 1964 A's were playing only .327 baseball at 17–35 on June 10, when he was replaced by Mel McGaha, who led the team to 40 wins and 70 losses to finish the year. McGaha was fired 26 games into the following season. (During the first ten years Charlie Finley owned the A's he hired eight different managers.) Lopat's final major league managerial record was 90–124 (.421).

Lopat remained with the Athletics as a senior front office aide to team owner Charlie Finley until the club moved to Oakland after the 1967 season. He then scouted for the Montreal Expos during their early years in Major League Baseball. He also scouted for the Kansas City Royals, Yankees and the Major League Scouting Bureau.

=== Managerial record ===
Team	Year	Regular season					Postseason			
Team	Year	Games	Won	Lost	Win %	Finish	Won	Lost	Win %	Result
KCA	1963	162	73	89	.451	Eighth in AL	–	–	–	–
KCA	1964	52	17	35	.327	Fired (June 10)	–	–	–	–
Total		214	90	124	.421		0	0	–	

== Honors ==
In 1978, Eddie Lopat was inducted into the National Polish-American Sports Hall of Fame.

== Death ==
He died at his son's home in Darien, Connecticut, on June 15, 1992.

Sporting positions
Preceded by Luke Appling	Richmond Virginians manager 1956–1958	Succeeded by Steve Souchock
Preceded by Jim Turner	New York Yankees pitching coach 1960	Succeeded by Johnny Sain
Preceded by Bob Swift (Washington Senators)	Minnesota Twins pitching coach 1961	Succeeded by Gordon Maltzberger
Preceded by Ted Wilks	Kansas City Athletics pitching coach 1962–1963	Succeeded by Tom Ferrick
