= Ray Coleman (baseball) =

American baseball player (1922–2010)

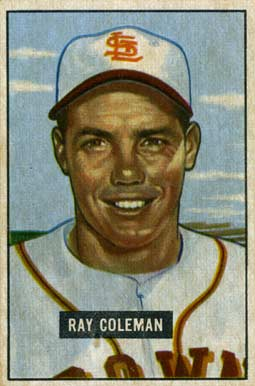
- Outfielder
- Born: June 4, 1922; Dunsmuir, California, U.S.
- Died: September 19, 2010 (aged 88); Norman, Oklahoma, U.S.
- Batted: Left Threw: Right

MLB debut
- April 22, 1947, for the St. Louis Browns

Last MLB appearance
- September 26, 1952, for the St. Louis Browns

MLB statistics
- Batting average: .258
- Home runs: 20
- Runs batted in: 199
- Stats at Baseball Reference

Teams
- St. Louis Browns (1947–1948); Philadelphia Athletics (1948); St. Louis Browns (1950–1951); Chicago White Sox (1951–1952); St. Louis Browns (1952)

Raymond Leroy Coleman (June 4, 1922 – September 19, 2010) was an American professional baseball outfielder who appeared in 559 career games over five seasons in Major League Baseball between 1947 and 1952 for the St. Louis Browns (over three separate stints), Philadelphia Athletics and Chicago White Sox. Born in Dunsmuir, California, he batted left-handed, threw right-handed and was listed as 5 feet 11 inches (1.80 m) tall and 170 pounds (77 kg).

Signed by the Browns as an amateur free agent in 1940 out of Yreka High School, Coleman played 14 seasons of professional baseball until his 1956 retirement, missing the 1943 through 1945 campaigns while serving in the United States Navy in the Mediterranean and Pacific theaters of operation of World War II. He made his major league debut in 1947. Coleman put together two consecutive years with 20-plus doubles (25 in 1950 and 24 in 1951), while finishing second in the American League with 12 triples in 1951. He compiled 146 hits with 76 runs driven in during the 1951 season.

Overall, Coleman batted .258 as a major leaguer; his 446 career hits included 73 doubles, 20 triples, 33 home runs and 199 RBI. After his third term as a member of the Browns in 1952, St. Louis sent him to the Brooklyn Dodgers' organization as part payment for shortstop Billy Hunter, and he played four more seasons in the minor leagues before leaving the game.

A retired bookkeeper, Ray Coleman died September 19, 2010, at age 88.

== Sources ==
- Career statistics from Baseball Reference · Baseball Reference (Minors) · Retrosheet · Baseball Almanac
