= Ralph Weigel =

American baseball player (1921–1992)

- Catcher
- Born: October 2, 1921; Coldwater, Ohio, U.S.
- Died: April 15, 1992 (aged 70); Memphis, Tennessee, U.S.
- Batted: Right Threw: Right

MLB debut
- September 18, 1946, for the Cleveland Indians

Last MLB appearance
- July 7, 1949, for the Washington Senators

MLB statistics
- Batting average: .230
- Home runs: 0
- Runs batted in: 30
- Stats at Baseball Reference

Teams
- Cleveland Indians (1946); Chicago White Sox (1948); Washington Senators (1949)

Ralph Richard Weigel (October 2, 1921 – April 15, 1992), nicknamed "Wig", was an American professional baseball player, a catcher who appeared in 106 Major League games over three seasons for the Cleveland Indians (1946), Chicago White Sox (1948) and Washington Senators (1949).

A native of Coldwater, Ohio, Weigel threw and batted right-handed; he stood 6 feet 1 inch (1.85 m) tall and weighed 180 pounds (82 kg). Weigel's professional career lasted from 1940 through 1949, although he missed the 1943–1945 seasons while serving in the United States Coast Guard during World War II.

His 54 Major League hits included nine doubles and three triples.
