= Fred Bradley (baseball) =

American baseball player (1920–2012)

- Pitcher
- Born: July 31, 1920; Parsons, Kansas, U.S.
- Died: April 24, 2012 (aged 91); Montebello, California, U.S.
- Batted: Right Threw: Right

MLB debut
- May 11, 1948, for the Chicago White Sox

Last MLB appearance
- May 1, 1949, for the Chicago White Sox

MLB statistics
- Win–loss record: 0-0
- Earned run average: 5.60
- Strikeouts: 2
- Stats at Baseball Reference

Teams
- Chicago White Sox (1948–1949)

Fred Langdon Bradley (July 31, 1920 – April 24, 2012) was an American pitcher in Major League Baseball who played in 1948 and 1949 for the Chicago White Sox. Listed at 6 ft 1 in (1.85 m), 180 lb., he batted and threw right-handed. Bradley was one of many baseball players whose career was interrupted during World War II.

Bradley was signed by the New York Yankees in 1940 and immediately was assigned to their minor league system. In 1941 and 1942, he averaged 15 wins per season before joining the U.S. Navy in 1943.

Following his military discharge, Bradley pitched in the Yankees' AAA system during 1946 and 1947. In 1948 he was dealt by New York, along Aaron Robinson and Bill Wight, to the White Sox in exchange for Eddie Lopat.

In 1948 Bradley posted a 4.60 earned run average in eight relief appearances for the White Sox and did not have a decision. He opened 1949 in the minor leagues and made one start with Chicago in May, after which he returned to the minors for two more seasons.

Bradley went 0–0 with a 5.60 ERA in nine games, allowing eleven earned runs on 15 hits and seven walks while striking out two in 17 2/3 innings of work. In a six-year minor league career, he went 61–52 with a 3.63 ERA in 172 games.
