= Don Kolloway =

American baseball player (1918–1994)

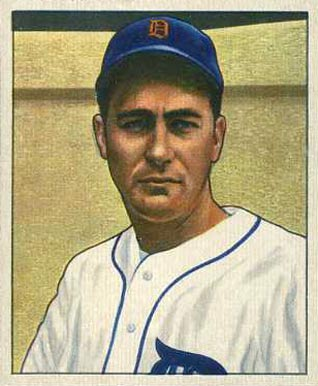
- Second baseman / First baseman
- Born: August 4, 1918; Posen, Illinois, U.S.
- Died: June 30, 1994 (aged 75); Blue Island, Illinois, U.S.
- Batted: Right Threw: Right

MLB debut
- September 16, 1940, for the Chicago White Sox

Last MLB appearance
- April 21, 1953, for the Philadelphia Athletics

MLB statistics
- Batting average: .271
- Home runs: 29
- Runs batted in: 393
- Stats at Baseball Reference

Teams
- Chicago White Sox (1940–1943, 1946–1949); Detroit Tigers (1949–1952); Philadelphia Athletics (1953)

Donald Martin Kolloway (August 4, 1918 – June 30, 1994), was an American professional baseball player who played 12 years in Major League Baseball as an infielder for the Chicago White Sox (1940–1943, 1946–1949), Detroit Tigers (1949–1952) and Philadelphia Athletics (1953).

Kolloway's family moved to Blue Island when he was two years old, and he continued to live there for the rest of his life. He began his baseball career in Longview, Texas in 1938 and moved up to Oklahoma City in the Texas League the following year, where his batting average was .302. He debuted with the White Sox in 1940. Kolloway was a line drive hitter with good speed, who seldom walked and struck-out infrequently. While playing for the White Sox in 1942, he led the league with 40 doubles and was among the AL leaders in stolen bases (16), caught stealing (14), and at bats (601). On June 28, 1941, Kolloway led the White Sox to a win over the Indians, as he hit two home runs, and stole four bases, including stealing second, third, and home in the ninth inning. He served in the U.S. Army during World War II from 1943 to 1946.

In May 1949, the White Sox traded Kolloway to Detroit for Earl Rapp. In 1950, Kolloway hit .289 and had a career-high 62 RBIs for the Tigers.

After his baseball career ended, he owned and operated a tavern called Kolloway's in Blue Island from 1956 to 1969. Later in life he worked in voter registration for Cook County. He died in 1994 at age 75 in Blue Island.

In his 12-year career in the major leagues, Kolloway played in 1,079 games and had a .271 batting average with 1,081 hits, 466 runs scored, 393 RBIs, 180 doubles, 30 triples, 76 stolen bases, and 29 home runs. He played 616 games at second base, 314 at first base, and 67 at third base.

== See also ==
- List of Major League Baseball annual doubles leaders
