= 1949 St. Louis Browns season =

Major League Baseball season

1949 St. Louis Browns
- League: American League
- Ballpark: Sportsman's Park
- City: St. Louis, Missouri
- Record: 53–101 (.344)
- League place: 7th
- Owners: Bill DeWitt
- General managers: Bill DeWitt
- Managers: Zack Taylor
- Television: KSD
- Radio: WEW/KWK (Johnny O'Hara, Tom Dailey)

The 1949 St. Louis Browns season involved the Browns finishing 7th in the American League with a record of 53 wins and 101 losses.

== Offseason ==
- October 4, 1948: Sam Dente was traded by the Browns to the Washington Senators for John Sullivan, Tom Ferrick and $25,000.
- December 16, 1948: Bob Savage was selected off waivers by the Browns from the Philadelphia Athletics.

== Regular season ==
=== Season standings ===
American League
Team	W	L	Pct.	GB	Home	Road
New York Yankees	97	57	.630	—	54‍–‍23	43‍–‍34
Boston Red Sox	96	58	.623	1	61‍–‍16	35‍–‍42
Cleveland Indians	89	65	.578	8	49‍–‍28	40‍–‍37
Detroit Tigers	87	67	.565	10	50‍–‍27	37‍–‍40
Philadelphia Athletics	81	73	.526	16	52‍–‍25	29‍–‍48
Chicago White Sox	63	91	.409	34	32‍–‍45	31‍–‍46
St. Louis Browns	53	101	.344	44	36‍–‍41	17‍–‍60
Washington Senators	50	104	.325	47	26‍–‍51	24‍–‍53

=== Record vs. opponents ===
1949 American League record Sources:
Team	BOS	CWS	CLE	DET	NYY	PHA	SLB	WSH
Boston	—	17–5	8–14	15–7–1	9–13	14–8	15–7	18–4
Chicago	5–17	—	7–15	8–14	7–15	6–16	15–7	15–7
Cleveland	14–8	15–7	—	13–9	10–12	9–13	15–7	13–9
Detroit	7–15–1	14–8	9–13	—	11–11	14–8	14–8	18–4
New York	13–9	15–7	12–10	11–11	—	14–8	17–5–1	15–7
Philadelphia	8–14	16–6	13–9	8–14	8–14	—	12–10	16–6
St. Louis	7–15	7–15	7–15	8–14	5–17–1	10–12	—	9–13
Washington	4–18	7–15	9–13	4–18	7–15	6–16	13–9	—

=== Roster ===
1949 St. Louis Browns
Roster
Pitchers: 35 Ed Albrecht; 22,36 Jim Bilbrey; 20 Karl Drews; 35 Red Embree; 23 Cliff Fannin; 24 Tom Ferrick; 31 Ned Garver; 26,30 Bill Kennedy; 30 Bob Malloy; 18 Irv Medlinger; 21 Joe Ostrowski; 29,37 Al Papai; 40 Ribs Raney; 27 Bob Savage; 34 Ray Shore; 28 Dick Starr; 26,40 Ralph Winegarner	Catchers: 9 Sherm Lollar; 10 Les Moss; Infielders: 7 Andy Anderson; 6 Bob Dillinger; -- Owen Friend; 11 Jack Graham; 3 Al Naples; 4 Eddie Pellagrini; 2 Jerry Priddy; 1 John Sullivan	Outfielders: 3 George Elder; 19 Dick Kokos; 17 Paul Lehner; 5 Whitey Platt; 15 Roy Sievers; 8 Stan Spence; 12 Ken Wood; 14 Al Zarilla; Other batters: 3 Hank Arft; 3 Frankie Pack	Manager: 38 Zack Taylor; Coaches: 33 Fred Hofmann; 32 Joe Schultz; 25 Jack Tobin; 40 Ralph Winegarner

== Player stats ==
= Indicates team leader

= Indicates league leader

=== Batting ===
==== Starters by position ====
Note: Pos = Position; G = Games played; AB = At bats; H = Hits; Avg. = Batting average; HR = Home runs; RBI = Runs batted in

Pos	Player	G	AB	H	Avg.	HR	RBI	SB
C	Sherm Lollar	109	284	74	.261	8	49	0
1B	Jack Graham	137	500	119	.238	24	79	0
2B	Jerry Priddy	145	544	158	.290	11	63	5
SS	Eddie Pellagrini	79	235	56	.238	2	15	2
3B	Bob Dillinger	137	544	176	.324	1	51	20
OF	Stan Spence	104	314	77	.245	13	45	1
OF	Dick Kokos	143	501	131	.261	23	77	3
OF	Roy Sievers	140	471	144	.306	16	91	1

==== Other batters ====
Note: G = Games played; AB = At bats; H = Hits; Avg. = Batting average; HR = Home runs; RBI = Runs batted in

Player	G	AB	H	Avg.	HR	RBI
Paul Lehner	104	297	68	.229	3	37
Les Moss	97	278	81	.291	10	39
Whitey Platt	102	244	63	.258	3	29
John Sullivan	105	243	55	.226	0	18
Andy Anderson	71	136	17	.125	1	5
Al Zarilla	15	56	14	.250	1	6
George Elder	41	44	11	.250	0	2
Owen Friend	2	8	3	.375	0	1
Al Naples	2	7	1	.143	0	0
Ken Wood	7	6	0	.000	0	0
Hank Arft	6	5	1	.200	0	2
Frankie Pack	1	1	0	.000	0	0

=== Pitching ===
= Indicates league leader

==== Starting pitchers ====
Note: G = Games pitched; IP = Innings pitched; W = Wins; L = Losses; ERA = Earned run average; SO = Strikeouts

Player	G	IP	W	L	ERA	SO
Ned Garver	41	223.2	12	17*	3.98	70
Cliff Fannin	30	143.0	8	14	6.17	57
Karl Drews	31	139.2	4	12	6.64	35
Ribs Raney	3	16.1	1	2	7.71	5
Ed Albrecht	1	5.0	1	0	5.40	1

- Tied with Paul Calvert and Sid Hudson (both with Washington)

==== Other pitchers ====
Note: G = Games pitched; IP = Innings pitched; W = Wins; L = Losses; ERA = Earned run average; SO = Strikeouts

Player	G	IP	W	L	ERA	SO
Bill Kennedy	48	153.2	4	11	4.69	69
Al Papai	42	142.1	4	11	5.06	31
Joe Ostrowski	40	141.0	8	8	4.79	34
Red Embree	35	127.1	3	13	5.37	24
Dick Starr	30	83.1	1	7	4.32	44

==== Relief pitchers ====
Note: G = Games pitched; W = Wins; L = Losses; SV = Saves; ERA = Earned run average; SO = Strikeouts

Player	G	W	L	SV	ERA	SO
Tom Ferrick	50	6	4	6	3.88	34
Ray Shore	13	0	1	0	10.80	13
Ralph Winegarner	9	0	0	0	7.56	8
Bob Malloy	5	1	1	0	2.79	2
Bob Savage	4	0	0	0	6.43	1
Irv Medlinger	3	0	0	0	27.00	4
Jim Bilbrey	1	0	0	0	18.00	0

== Farm system ==
Level	Team	League	Manager
AAA	Baltimore Orioles	International League	Alphonse "Tommy" Thomas and Jack Dunn III
AA	San Antonio Missions	Texas League	Gus Mancuso
A	Elmira Pioneers	Eastern League	Don Heffner, Jack Tobin and Sal Madrid
B	Wichita Falls Spudders	Big State League	Jack Bradsher
B	Springfield Browns	Illinois–Indiana–Iowa League	Jim Crandall
C	Globe-Miami Browns	Arizona–Texas League	Frank Volpi and Ed Dancisak
C	Gloversville-Johnstown Glovers	Canadian–American League	Jim Cullinane
C	Pine Bluff Cardinals	Cotton States League	Harry Chozen
C	Marshall Browns	East Texas League	Walt DeFreitas
C	Aberdeen Pheasants	Northern League	Irv Hall
C	Salinas/Tijuana Colts	Sunset League	Bruce Ogrodowski
C	Muskogee Reds	Western Association	Heinie Mueller
D	Redding Browns	Far West League	Ray Perry
D	Pittsburg Browns	Kansas–Oklahoma–Missouri League	Albert Barkus and Olan Smith
D	Mayfield Clothiers	KITTY League	Bill Enos
D	Olean Oilers	PONY League	Shan Deniston and Larry Mancini
D	Ada Herefords	Sooner State League	Bill Krueger
D	Wausau Lumberjacks	Wisconsin State League	Joe Skurski

LEAGUE CHAMPIONS: Aberdeen
Salinas club moved to Tijuana, August 5, 1949
