= 1946 St. Louis Browns season =

Major League Baseball season

1946 St. Louis Browns
- League: American League
- Ballpark: Sportsman's Park
- City: St. Louis, Missouri
- Record: 66–88 (.429)
- League place: 7th
- Owners: Richard Muckerman
- General managers: Bill DeWitt
- Managers: Luke Sewell, Zack Taylor
- Radio: WIL (Dizzy Dean, Johnny O'Hara); WTMV/WEW (Harry Caray, Gabby Street)

The 1946 St. Louis Browns season involved the Browns finishing 7th in the American League with a record of 66 wins and 88 losses.

== Regular season ==
=== Season standings ===
American League
Team	W	L	Pct.	GB	Home	Road
Boston Red Sox	104	50	.675	—	61‍–‍16	43‍–‍34
Detroit Tigers	92	62	.597	12	48‍–‍30	44‍–‍32
New York Yankees	87	67	.565	17	47‍–‍30	40‍–‍37
Washington Senators	76	78	.494	28	38‍–‍38	38‍–‍40
Chicago White Sox	74	80	.481	30	40‍–‍38	34‍–‍42
Cleveland Indians	68	86	.442	36	36‍–‍41	32‍–‍45
St. Louis Browns	66	88	.429	38	35‍–‍41	31‍–‍47
Philadelphia Athletics	49	105	.318	55	31‍–‍46	18‍–‍59

=== Record vs. opponents ===
1946 American League record Sources:
Team	BOS	CWS	CLE	DET	NYY	PHA	SLB	WSH
Boston	—	13–9	15–7	15–7–1	14–8	17–5	14–8–1	16–6
Chicago	9–13	—	13–9–1	10–12	8–14	12–10	12–10	10–12
Cleveland	7–15	9–13–1	—	5–17	10–12	15–7	15–7–1	7–15
Detroit	7–15–1	12–10	17–5	—	13–9	17–5	14–8	12–10
New York	8–14	14–8	12–10	9–13	—	16–6	14–8	14–8
Philadelphia	5–17	10–12	7–15	5–17	6–16	—	10–12	6–16–1
St. Louis	8–14–1	10–12	7–15–1	8–14	8–14	12–10	—	13–9
Washington	6–16	12–10	15–7	10–12	8–14	16–6–1	9–13	—

=== Notable transactions ===
- June 15, 1946: Joe Grace and Al LaMacchia were traded by the Browns to the Washington Senators for Jeff Heath.

=== Roster ===
1946 St. Louis Browns
Roster
Pitchers: 10 Frank Biscan; 47 Cliff Fannin; 45 Stan Ferens; 25 Tom Ferrick; 30 Denny Galehouse; 25 Al Hollingsworth; 39 Chet Johnson; 21 Ellis Kinder; 35 Jack Kramer; 44 Al LaMacchia; 37 Ox Miller; 40 Al Milnar; 29 Bob Muncrief; 27 Nels Potter; 41 Fred Sanford; 28 Tex Shirley; 16 Ray Shore; 31 Steve Sundra; 26 Sam Zoldak	Catchers: 11 Hank Helf; 8,44 Frank Mancuso; 10,22 Babe Martin; 23 Les Moss; 9 Joe Schultz; 12,16 Ken Sears; Infielders: 23 George Archie; 4 Johnny Berardino; 6 Mark Christman; 3 Babe Dahlgren; 2 Bob Dillinger; 7 Johnny Lucadello; 1 Len Schulte; 5 Vern Stephens; 24 Chuck Stevens; 37 Jerry Witte	Outfielders: 22 George Bradley; 18 Lou Finney; 19 Joe Grace; 18,40 Jeff Heath; 17 Wally Judnich; 12 Chet Laabs; 19 Paul Lehner; 15 Glenn McQuillen; 14,20 Al Zarilla	Manager: 32 Luke Sewell; 34 Zack Taylor; Coaches: 33 Fred Hofmann; 34 Zack Taylor; -- Jack Tobin

== Player stats ==
=== Batting ===
==== Starters by position ====
Note: Pos = Position; G = Games played; AB = At bats; H = Hits; Avg. = Batting average; HR = Home runs; RBI = Runs batted in

Pos	Player	G	AB	H	Avg.	HR	RBI
C	Frank Mancuso	87	262	63	.240	3	23
1B	Chuck Stevens	122	432	107	.248	3	27
2B	Johnny Berardino	144	582	154	.265	5	68
SS	Vern Stephens	115	450	138	.307	14	64
3B	Mark Christman	128	458	118	.258	1	41
OF	Al Zarilla	125	371	96	.259	4	43
OF	Wally Judnich	142	511	134	.262	15	72
OF	Jeff Heath	86	316	87	.275	12	57

==== Other batters ====
Note: G = Games played; AB = At bats; H = Hits; Avg. = Batting average; HR = Home runs; RBI = Runs batted in

Player	G	AB	H	Avg.	HR	RBI
Chet Laabs	80	264	69	.261	16	52
Bob Dillinger	83	225	63	.280	0	11
Johnny Lucadello	87	210	52	.248	1	15
Hank Helf	71	182	35	.192	6	21
Glenn McQuillen	59	166	40	.241	1	12
Joe Grace	48	161	37	.230	1	13
Babe Dahlgren	28	80	14	.175	0	9
Jerry Witte	18	73	14	.192	2	4
Joe Schultz	42	57	22	.386	0	14
Paul Lehner	16	45	10	.222	0	5
Les Moss	12	35	13	.371	0	5
Lou Finney	16	30	9	.300	0	3
Ken Sears	7	15	5	.333	0	1
George Bradley	4	12	2	.167	0	3
George Archie	4	11	2	.182	0	0
Babe Martin	3	9	2	.222	0	1
Len Schulte	4	5	2	.400	0	2

=== Pitching ===
==== Starting pitchers ====
Note: G = Games pitched; IP = Innings pitched; W = Wins; L = Losses; ERA = Earned run average; SO = Strikeouts

Player	G	IP	W	L	ERA	SO
Jack Kramer	31	194.2	13	11	3.19	69
Denny Galehouse	30	180.0	8	12	3.65	90
Nels Potter	23	145.0	8	9	3.72	72
Tex Shirley	27	139.2	6	12	4.96	45
Fred Sanford	3	22.0	2	1	2.05	8

==== Other pitchers ====
Note: G = Games pitched; IP = Innings pitched; W = Wins; L = Losses; ERA = Earned run average; SO = Strikeouts

Player	G	IP	W	L	ERA	SO
Sam Zoldak	35	170.1	9	11	3.43	51
Bob Muncrief	29	115.1	3	12	4.99	49
Stan Ferens	34	88.0	2	9	4.50	28
Ellis Kinder	33	86.2	3	3	3.32	59
Cliff Fannin	27	86.2	5	2	3.01	52
Ox Miller	11	35.1	1	3	6.88	12
Chet Johnson	5	18.0	0	0	5.00	8
Al Milnar	4	14.2	1	1	2.45	1

==== Relief pitchers ====
Note: G = Games pitched; W = Wins; L = Losses; SV = Saves; ERA = Earned run average; SO = Strikeouts

Player	G	W	L	SV	ERA	SO
Tom Ferrick	25	4	1	5	2.78	13
Frank Biscan	16	1	1	1	5.16	9
Al LaMacchia	8	0	0	0	6.00	3
Al Hollingsworth	5	0	0	0	6.55	3
Steve Sundra	2	0	0	0	11.25	1
Ray Shore	1	0	0	0	18.00	1

== Farm system ==
Level	Team	League	Manager
AAA	Toledo Mud Hens	American Association	Don Gutteridge and George Detore
AA	San Antonio Missions	Texas League	Jimmy Adair
A	Elmira Pioneers	Eastern League	Ralph Winegarner
B	Springfield Browns	Illinois–Indiana–Iowa League	Tony Robello
B	Spartanburg Spartans	Tri-State League	Frank Kappelman
C	Gloversville-Johnstown Glovers	Canadian–American League	Bennie Huffman
C	Paris Red Peppers	East Texas League	Homer Peel
C	Aberdeen Pheasants	Northern League	Gus Albright
D	Pittsburg Browns	Kansas–Oklahoma–Missouri League	Jim Crandall
D	Mayfield Clothiers	KITTY League	Ed O'Connell
D	Newark Moundsmen	Ohio State League	Bob Boken
