= Springfield Browns =

- 1931–1950; (1931–1935, 1938–1942, 1946–1950); Springfield, Illinois

Minor league affiliations
- Class: Class B (1931, 1938–1942, 1946–1949); Class D (1950)
- League: Illinois–Indiana–Iowa League (1931–1932); Mississippi Valley League (1933); Central League (1934); Illinois–Indiana–Iowa League (1935, 1938–1942, 1946–1949); Mississippi-Ohio Valley League (1950)

Major league affiliations
- Team: St. Louis Browns (1931); St. Louis Cardinals (1933–1934); Detroit Tigers (1935); St. Louis Browns (1938–1942, 1946–1949)

Minor league titles
- League titles (1): 1939
- Conference titles (1): 1931

Team data
- Name: Springfield Browns (1931); Springfield Senators (1932–1933); Springfield Red Birds (1934); Springfield Senators (1935); Springfield Browns (1938–1942, 1946–1949); Springfield Giants (1950)
- Ballpark: Reservoir Park (1931–1933); Lanphier Park (1938–1942, 1946–1949); Jim Fitzpatrick Memorial Stadium (1950)

The Springfield Browns was a primary moniker of the minor league baseball teams based in Springfield, Illinois between 1931 and 1950.

Springfield teams played as members of the Illinois–Indiana–Iowa League (1931–1932), Mississippi Valley League (1933), Central League (1934), Illinois–Indiana–Iowa League (1935, 1938–1942, 1946–1949) and Mississippi-Ohio Valley League (1950), winning the 1939 league championship.

Springfield hosted minor league home games at Reservoir Park, Lanphier Park and Jim Fitzpatrick Memorial Stadium in the era.

Springfield teams were a minor affiliate of the St. Louis Browns (1931), St. Louis Cardinals (1933–1934), Detroit Tigers (1935) and St. Louis Browns (1938–1942, 1946–1949).

== History ==
=== Illinois-Iowa-Indiana League 1931–1932 ===
With a new moniker, the 1931 Springfield Browns won the Illinois-Iowa-Indiana League Pennant. The franchise adopted the "Browns" moniker in 1931 after playing as the Springfield Senators from 1925 to 1930 as members of the Class B|level Illinois-Iowa-Indiana League. The moniker resulted from Springfield becoming a minor league affiliate of the St. Louis Browns. Springfield ended the 1931 season with a record of 72–45, placing firstst in the Illinois-Iowa-Indiana League standings. Bill Wambsganss served as manager for the season. In the Playoffs, the Quincy Indians defeated the Springfield Browns 4 games to 2. Springfield played home games at Reservoir Park.

The Springfield Senators continued play in the 1932 Illinois-Iowa-Indiana League, before disbanding mid–season. Springfield (3–7 in second half) and the Decatur Commodores both disbanded July 12, 1932 and the league disbanded on July 19, 1932. The Senators finished with a 32–37 overall record, placing fourth in the Illinois-Iowa-Indiana League standings under Manager Rube Dessau.

=== Mississippi Valley League 1933/Central League 1934 ===
The 1933 Springfield Senators became an affiliate of the St. Louis Cardinals, playing in the Class B level Missouri Valley League. Springfield ended the 1933 season with a record of 43–70, placing fifth in the Missouri Valley League, finishing 38.5 games behind the champion Davenport Blue Sox. Clay Hopper served as manager.

The Springfield Red Birds joined the Class B level Central League for the 1934 season, adopting the "Red Birds" moniker in their second season as a St. Louis Cardinals affiliate. On June 10, 1934, the Red Birds were in second place in the Central League standings with a record of 14–12, under manager Joe Mathes when the Central League permanently disbanded. Springfield began playing home games at Lanphier Park in 1934.

=== Illinois-Iowa-Indiana League 1935, 1938–1942 ===
Springfield rejoined the Class B level Illinois-Iowa-Indiana League in 1935, becoming a minor league affiliate of the Detroit Tigers. The Springfield Senators ended the 1935 season with a record of 74–45, placing second in the Illinois-Iowa-Indiana League standings. Bob Coleman was the manager in 1935. In the Playoffs, the Springfield Senators defeated the Bloomington Bloomers 4 games to 2. However, Bloomington was declared the winner when Springfield refused to replay the protested final game, a ruling that was upheld by the league president.

After a two–season absence from minor league baseball, the 1938 Springfield Browns began a long affiliation with the St. Louis Browns and the Illinois-Iowa-Indiana League, playing at Lanphier Park. The Browns ended the 1938 regular season in fourth place with a record of 63–60, under Manager Walter Holke. In the Playoffs, the Decatur Commodores defeated the Springfield Browns 3 games to 2. Season attendance at Lanphier Park was 66,944, an average of 1,089 per game.

The 1939 Springfield Browns were the Illinois-Iowa-Indiana League Champions. Springfield ended the 1939 regular season with a record of 65–55, finishing fourth in the Illinois-Iowa-Indiana League standings under manager Walter Holke. In the 1939 Playoffs, Springfield defeated the Evansville Bees 3 games to 1 to advance. In the Finals, the Springfield Browns defeated the Decatur Commodores 3 games to 2 to win the championship. Season attendance at Lanphier Park was 37,916 an average of 632.

The Browns placed third in the 1940 Illinois-Iowa-Indiana League and qualified for the playoffs. Springfield finished the 1940 regular season with a record of 73–53, under manager Art Scharein. In the Playoffs, the Cedar Rapids Raiders swept Springfield in 3 games. Attendance was 56,569, an average of 898 per game.

The 1941 Springfield Browns again qualified for the playoffs in the Illinois-Iowa-Indiana League. Springfield finished with a 65–59 record to place fourth in the league standings under returning manager Art Scharein. In the Playoffs, the Cedar Rapids Raiders again defeated Springfield, 3 games to 1. Season attendance in Springfield was 41,194, an average of 664.

The Springfield Browns placed second in the 1942 Illinois-Iowa-Indiana League. Springfield ended the 1942 season with a record of 67–48, finishing 6.0 games behind the first place Cedar Rapids Raiders. Under manager Jimmy Adair, the Browns advanced to the playoffs. In the Playoffs, the Madison Blues defeated the Browns 3 games to 1. After the 1942 season, the league took a hiatus due to World War II.

=== Illinois-Iowa-Indiana League 1946–1949 ===
Returning to play following World War II, The Springfield Browns and the Illinois-Iowa-Indiana League returned to play. Playing at Lanphier Park, Springfield ended the 1946 season with a record of 58–67, placing sixth in the regular season standings, missing the playoffs. Tony Robello served as manager in 1946.

The Springfield Browns placed third in the 1947 Illinois-Iowa-Indiana League regular season. With a record of 71–55, under manager Ben Huffman, Springfield qualified for the postseason. In the 1947 Playoffs, the Springfield Browns defeated the Waterloo Hawks in a one–game playoff for third place. Continuing in the Playoffs, the Danville Dodgers defeated the Springfield Browns 3 games to 2. Total season attendance at Lanphier Park was 58,009, an average of 921 per game.

The 1948 season began the final two seasons of Illinois-Iowa-Indiana League play, with Springfield finishing in the bottom portion of the standings in both seasons. The Springfield Browns finished the 1948 season in 6th place, with a 56–67 record. Hank Helf and Irv Hall were the 1948 managers. Season attendance was 54,463, an average of 886.

In 1949, the Springfield Browns finished last in the Illinois-Iowa-Indiana League in their final season in the league and their final season as a St. Louis Browns affiliate. Springfield ended the 1949 season with a record of 53–73, placing eighth under Manager Jimmie Crandall. 1949 attendance at Lanphier Park was 48,952, an average of 777 per game. The Browns folded from the Illinois-Iowa-Indiana League after the 1949 season.

=== Mississippi-Ohio Valley League 1950 ===
The 1950 Springfield Giants continued minor league play in Springfield, as the franchise became members of the Class D level Mississippi-Ohio Valley League. The Mississippi Valley League later evolved to become the Midwest League in 1956. The Springfield Giants ended the 1950 season with a record of 60–59, placing fifth Mississippi-Ohio Valley League. Ham Schulte and Von Price were the Springfield managers. Springfield played the 1950 season home games at Jim Fitzpatrick Memorial Stadium. Season home attendance was 21,126, an average of 355 per game. The Springfield franchise folded after the 1950 season.

Springfield remained without a minor league team until 1978 when the relocated New Orleans Pelicans were renamed the Springfield Redbirds and played as members of the American Association at Robin Roberts Stadium at Lanphier Park.

== The ballparks ==
The Springfield minor league teams reportedly played home minor league games at Reservoir Park from 1931 to 1933. The ballpark was located on the site where Lanphier High School was constructed. The Lanphier High School location is 1300 North 11th Street, Springfield, Illinois.

The 1950 Springfield Giants were noted to have played minor league home games at Jim Fitzpatrick Memorial Stadium. The ballpark had previously hosted some games of the Springfield Sallies of the All-American Girls Professional Baseball League from 1948 to 1950. With a capacity of 4,500, the ballpark was located at South 4th Street & East Stanford Avenue, Springfield, Illinois.

Beginning in 1934, the Springfield teams reportedly played home games at Lanphier Park. Lanphier Park was built in 1925 at a cost of $49,000. Lanphier Park had a capacity of 4,500 and dimensions of (Left, Center, Right): 320–400–320 (1939). Still in use for baseball today, the ballpark is known as Robin Roberts Stadium at Lanphier Park, named after Baseball Hall of Fame member Robin Roberts, who graduated from Lanphier High School. Today, the ballpark is home to the Springfield Lucky Horseshoes, a collegiate summer league baseball team that plays as a member of the Prospect League.

== Timeline ==
Year(s)	# Yrs.	Team	Level	League	Affiliate	Ballpark
1931	1	Springfield Browns	Class B	Illinois–Indiana–Iowa League	St. Louis Browns	Reservoir Park
1932	1	Springfield Senators	Class B	Illinois–Indiana–Iowa League	None	Reservoir Park
1933	1	Springfield Senators	Class B	Mississippi Valley League	St. Louis Cardinals	Reservoir Park
1934	1	Springfield Red Birds	Class B	Central League	St. Louis Cardinals	Lanphier Park
1935	1	Springfield Senators	Class B	Illinois-Iowa-Indiana League	Detroit Tigers	Lanphier Park
1938-1942	5	Springfield Browns	Class B	Illinois-Iowa-Indiana League	St. Louis Browns	Lanphier Park
1946-1949	4	Springfield Browns	Class B	Illinois-Iowa-Indiana League	St. Louis Browns	Lanphier Park
1950	1	Springfield Giants	Class D	Mississippi-Ohio Valley League	None	Jim Fitzpatrick Memorial Stadium

== Notable alumni ==
- Jimmy Adair (1942, MGR)
- Andy Anderson (1942)
- Hank Arft (1942, 1946–1947)
- Al Baker (1932)
- Floyd Baker (1941)
- Red Barkley (1938)
- Jim Bilbrey (1942)
- Emil Bildilli (1938)
- George Bradley (1940–1941)
- Herb Bradley (1935)
- Lindsay Brown (1935)
- Clay Bryant (1932)
- Ed Busch (1940-1942)
- Joe Buskey (1932)
- Ray Coleman (1940, 1942)
- Roy Cullenbine (1935)
- Perry Currin (1947–1948)
- Tony Criscola (1938)
- Frank Croucher (1935)
- Art Daney (1932)
- Red Evans (1932)
- Owen Friend (1947)
- Joe Grace (1940)
- Irv Hall (1948, MGR)
- Jim Hamby (1932)
- George Hausmann (1941)
- Loy Hanning (1939)
- Mel Held (1949)
- Hank Helf (1948, MGR)
- Walter Holke (1938–1939, MGR)
- Ben Huffman (1947, MGR)
- Harry Kimberlin (1933)
- Dick Kimble (1942)
- Elmer Klumpp (1931)
- Earl Jones (1940–1941)
- Red Jones (1935)
- Don Larsen (1949) Perfect Game: 1956 World Series
- Don Lenhardt (1948)
- Dutch Leonard (1931) 5x MLB All–Star
- Ed Levy (1949)
- Bill Lohrman (1933)
- Joe Lutz (1946)
- Red Lynn (1934)
- Max Macon (1934)
- Babe Martin (1942)
- Hersh Martin (1933) MLB All-Star
- Jerry McCarthy (1949)
- Bill Miller (1940)
- Bill Mizeur (1931)
- Billy Myers (1932)
- Lynn Myers (1933)
- Al Naples (1949)
- Bob Neighbors (1939)
- Stan Partenheimer (1946–1947)
- Gil Paulsen (1931)
- Sid Peterson (1941)
- Leon Pettit (1931)
- Ed Redys (1946–1947)
- Tony Robello (1946, MGR)
- Buster Ross (1931)
- Frank Sacka (1947–1948)
- Art Scharein (1940–1941, MGR)
- Ham Schulte (1950, MGR)
- Len Schulte (1938, 1940)
- Lou Scoffic (1933)
- Ray Shore (1942, 1946)
- Roy Sievers (1948) 5x MLB All-Star; 1949 AL Rookie of the Year
- Elmer Smith (1931)
- Woody Smith (1948)
- Lefty Smoll (1935)
- Jerry Standaert (1931–1932)
- Chuck Stevens (1938-1939)
- Vern Stephens (1938) 7x MLB All-Star; 3x AL RBI Leader
- Marlin Stuart (1942)
- George Susce (1931)
- Bud Swartz (1948)
- Birdie Tebbetts (1935) 4x MLB All-Star
- Johnny Tillman (1932)
- Mike Tresh (1935)
- Frank Waddey (1932)
- Bill Wambsganss (1931, MGR)
- Skeeter Webb (1932–1933)
- Roger Wolff (1932)
- Ken Wood (1941)
- Al Zarilla (1941) MLB All-Star

== See also ==
- Springfield Browns players
- Springfield Senators players
