= 1949 Philadelphia Athletics season =

1949 Philadelphia Athletics
- League: American League
- Ballpark: Shibe Park
- City: Philadelphia
- Record: 81–73 (.526)
- League place: 5th
- Owners: Connie Mack
- Managers: Connie Mack
- Television: WPTZ/WCAU/WFIL
- Radio: WIBG (By Saam, George Walsh, Claude Haring)

The 1949 Philadelphia Athletics season involved the A's finishing fifth in the American League with a record of 81 wins and 73 losses.

== Offseason ==
- November 10, 1948: Tod Davis was drafted by the Athletics from the Chicago White Sox in the 1948 rule 5 draft.
- December 16, 1948: Bob Savage was selected off waivers from the Athletics by the St. Louis Browns.
- Prior to 1949 season: Skeeter Kell was signed as an amateur free agent by the Athletics.

== Regular season ==
The 1949 Philadelphia Athletics team set a major league team record of executing 217 double plays, a record which still presently stands.

=== Season standings ===
American League
| Team | W | L | Pct. | GB | Home | Road |
|---|---|---|---|---|---|---|
| New York Yankees | 97 | 57 | .630 | — | 54‍–‍23 | 43‍–‍34 |
| Boston Red Sox | 96 | 58 | .623 | 1 | 61‍–‍16 | 35‍–‍42 |
| Cleveland Indians | 89 | 65 | .578 | 8 | 49‍–‍28 | 40‍–‍37 |
| Detroit Tigers | 87 | 67 | .565 | 10 | 50‍–‍27 | 37‍–‍40 |
| Philadelphia Athletics | 81 | 73 | .526 | 16 | 52‍–‍25 | 29‍–‍48 |
| Chicago White Sox | 63 | 91 | .409 | 34 | 32‍–‍45 | 31‍–‍46 |
| St. Louis Browns | 53 | 101 | .344 | 44 | 36‍–‍41 | 17‍–‍60 |
| Washington Senators | 50 | 104 | .325 | 47 | 26‍–‍51 | 24‍–‍53 |

=== Record vs. opponents ===
1949 American League record Sources:
| Team | BOS | CWS | CLE | DET | NYY | PHA | SLB | WSH |
|---|---|---|---|---|---|---|---|---|
| Boston | — | 17–5 | 8–14 | 15–7–1 | 9–13 | 14–8 | 15–7 | 18–4 |
| Chicago | 5–17 | — | 7–15 | 8–14 | 7–15 | 6–16 | 15–7 | 15–7 |
| Cleveland | 14–8 | 15–7 | — | 13–9 | 10–12 | 9–13 | 15–7 | 13–9 |
| Detroit | 7–15–1 | 14–8 | 9–13 | — | 11–11 | 14–8 | 14–8 | 18–4 |
| New York | 13–9 | 15–7 | 12–10 | 11–11 | — | 14–8 | 17–5–1 | 15–7 |
| Philadelphia | 8–14 | 16–6 | 13–9 | 8–14 | 8–14 | — | 12–10 | 16–6 |
| St. Louis | 7–15 | 7–15 | 7–15 | 8–14 | 5–17–1 | 10–12 | — | 9–13 |
| Washington | 4–18 | 7–15 | 9–13 | 4–18 | 7–15 | 6–16 | 13–9 | — |

=== Notable transactions ===
- September 28, 1949: Bill McCahan and $25,000 were traded by the Athletics to the Brooklyn Dodgers for Kermit Wahl.

=== Roster ===
1949 Philadelphia Athletics
Roster
| Pitchers: 19 Lou Brissie; 20 Joe Coleman; 25 Dick Fowler; 17,11 Bubba Harris; 36 Clem Hausmann; 22 Alex Kellner; 21 Phil Marchildon; 23 Bill McCahan; 24 Carl Scheib; 30 Bobby Shantz; 28,34 Jim Wilson | Catchers: 9,14 Joe Astroth; 9 Mike Guerra; 8 Buddy Rosar; Infielders: 11,39 Hank Biasatti; 16,31 Tod Davis; 5 Ferris Fain; 41,18 Nellie Fox; 1 Eddie Joost; 3 Hank Majeski; 12 Pete Suder | Outfielders: 4 Sam Chapman; 11 Bobby Estalella; 34 Augie Galan; 2 Wally Moses; 10 Elmer Valo; 13,15 Don White; 6 Taffy Wright | Manager: -- Connie Mack; Coaches: 26 Earle Brucker; 35 Jimmy Dykes; 29 Dave Keefe; 27 Earle Mack; 31 Les McCrabb; 32 Al Simmons |

== Player stats ==
| = Indicates team leader |

=== Batting ===
==== Starters by position ====
Note: Pos = Position; G = Games played; AB = At bats; H = Hits; Avg. = Batting average; HR = Home runs; RBI = Runs batted in

| Pos | Player | GP | AB | H | Avg. | HR | RBI |
|---|---|---|---|---|---|---|---|
| C | Mike Guerra | 98 | 298 | 79 | .265 | 3 | 31 |
| 1B | Ferris Fain | 150 | 525 | 138 | .263 | 3 | 78 |
| 2B | Pete Suder | 118 | 445 | 119 | .267 | 10 | 75 |
| SS | Eddie Joost | 144 | 525 | 138 | .263 | 23 | 81 |
| 3B | Hank Majeski | 114 | 448 | 124 | .277 | 9 | 67 |
| OF | Elmer Valo | 150 | 547 | 155 | .283 | 5 | 85 |
| OF | Wally Moses | 110 | 308 | 85 | .276 | 1 | 25 |
| OF | Sam Chapman | 154 | 589 | 164 | .278 | 24 | 108 |

==== Other batters ====
Note: G = Games played; AB = At bats; H = Hits; Avg. = Batting average; HR = Home runs; RBI = Runs batted in

| Player | G | AB | H | Avg. | HR | RBI |
|---|---|---|---|---|---|---|
| Nellie Fox | 88 | 247 | 63 | .255 | 0 | 21 |
| Don White | 57 | 169 | 36 | .213 | 0 | 10 |
| Taffy Wright | 59 | 149 | 35 | .235 | 2 | 25 |
| Joe Astroth | 55 | 148 | 36 | .243 | 0 | 12 |
| Buddy Rosar | 32 | 95 | 19 | .200 | 0 | 6 |
| Tod Davis | 31 | 75 | 20 | .267 | 1 | 6 |
| Augie Galan | 12 | 26 | 8 | .308 | 0 | 0 |
| Hank Biasatti | 21 | 24 | 2 | .083 | 0 | 2 |
| Bobby Estalella | 8 | 20 | 5 | .250 | 0 | 3 |

=== Pitching ===
==== Starting pitchers ====
Note: G = Games pitched; IP = Innings pitched; W = Wins; L = Losses; ERA = Earned run average; SO = Strikeouts

| Player | G | IP | W | L | ERA | SO |
|---|---|---|---|---|---|---|
| Alex Kellner | 38 | 245.0 | 20 | 12 | 3.75 | 94 |
| Joe Coleman | 33 | 240.1 | 13 | 14 | 3.86 | 109 |
| Lou Brissie | 34 | 229.1 | 16 | 11 | 4.28 | 118 |
| Dick Fowler | 31 | 213.1 | 15 | 11 | 3.75 | 43 |

==== Other pitchers ====
Note: G = Games pitched; IP = Innings pitched; W = Wins; L = Losses; ERA = Earned run average; SO = Strikeouts

| Player | G | IP | W | L | ERA | SO |
|---|---|---|---|---|---|---|
| Carl Scheib | 38 | 182.2 | 9 | 12 | 5.12 | 43 |
| Bobby Shantz | 33 | 127.0 | 6 | 8 | 3.40 | 58 |
| Bill McCahan | 7 | 20.2 | 1 | 1 | 2.61 | 3 |
| Phil Marchildon | 7 | 16.0 | 0 | 3 | 11.81 | 2 |

==== Relief pitchers ====
Note: G = Games pitched; W = Wins; L = Losses; SV = Saves; ERA = Earned run average; SO = Strikeouts

| Player | G | W | L | SV | ERA | SO |
|---|---|---|---|---|---|---|
| Bubba Harris | 37 | 1 | 1 | 3 | 5.44 | 18 |
| Jim Wilson | 2 | 0 | 0 | 0 | 14.40 | 2 |
| Clem Hausmann | 1 | 0 | 0 | 0 | 9.00 | 0 |

== Farm system ==
| Level | Team | League | Manager |
|---|---|---|---|
| A | Savannah Indians | Sally League | Frank Skaff |
| A | Lincoln Athletics | Western League | Jimmie DeShong |
| B | Martinsville Athletics | Carolina League | George Staller |
| C | Kewanee A's | Central Association | Harold Hoffman |
| C | Youngstown Athletics | Middle Atlantic League | Eddie Morgan |
| D | Welch Miners | Appalachian League | Bill Hoffner and Emil Kreshka |
| D | Tarboro Athletics | Coastal Plain League | Joe Antolick |
| D | Moultrie Athletics | Georgia–Florida League | Bill Peterman |
| D | Lexington Indians | North Carolina State League | Archie Templeton and Walt Van Grofski |
| D | Portsmouth A's | Ohio–Indiana League | Homer Lee Cox |
| D | Red Springs Red Robins | Tobacco State League | Red Norris |

LEAGUE CHAMPIONS: Kewanee, Red Springs
