= Raddle, Illinois =

- Unincorporated community
- Location within Illinois Location within the United States
- Coordinates: 37°46′44″N 89°35′12″W
- Country: United States
- State: Illinois
- County: Jackson
- Elevation: 361 ft (110 m)
- Time zone: UTC-6 (Central (CST))
  - Summer (DST): UTC-5 (CDT)
- Area code: 618
- GNIS feature ID: 416341

Raddle is an unincorporated community in Fountain Bluff Township, Jackson County, Illinois, United States. Raddle is located on County Route 32 and the Union Pacific Railroad 6.9 miles (11.1 km) west-northwest of Gorham.
