= Neunert, Illinois =

- Unincorporated community
- Location within Illinois Location within the United States
- Coordinates: 37°43′22″N 89°32′44″W
- Country: United States
- State: Illinois
- County: Jackson
- Elevation: 361 ft (110 m)
- Time zone: UTC-6 (Central (CST))
  - Summer (DST): UTC-5 (CDT)
- Area code: 618
- GNIS feature ID: 414372

Neunert is an unincorporated community in Fountain Bluff Township, Jackson County, Illinois, United States. The community is located at the intersection of County Highways 9 and 10, 3.3 miles (5.3 km) west of Gorham.
