= Don Black (baseball) =

American baseball player

- Black in 1947 photo
- Pitcher
- Born: July 20, 1916; Salix, Iowa, U.S.
- Died: April 21, 1959 (aged 42); Cuyahoga Falls, Ohio, U.S.
- Batted: Right Threw: Right

MLB debut
- April 24, 1943, for the Philadelphia Athletics

Last MLB appearance
- September 13, 1948, for the Cleveland Indians

MLB statistics
- Win–loss record: 34–55
- Earned run average: 4.35
- Strikeouts: 293
- Stats at Baseball Reference

Teams
- Philadelphia Athletics (1943–1945); Cleveland Indians (1946–1948)

Career highlights and awards
- Pitched a no-hitter on July 10, 1947

Donald Paul Black (July 20, 1916 or 1917 – April 21, 1959) was an American right-handed pitcher in Major League Baseball who played for six seasons in the American League with the Philadelphia Athletics and Cleveland Indians. In 154 career games, Black pitched 797 innings and posted a win–loss record of 34–55, with 37 complete games, four shutouts, and a 4.35 earned run average (ERA).

Born in Salix, Iowa, he played minor league baseball in Fairbury, Nebraska, and Petersburg, Virginia, before signing with the Philadelphia Athletics. He played with them for three seasons before being released. Black signed with the Cleveland Indians at the end of 1945, and after a season with them joined Alcoholics Anonymous. After completing the program, during the off season, he then played two more seasons with Cleveland, pitching a no-hitter on July 10, 1947. On September 13, 1948, Black suffered a cerebral hemorrhage on the field, which marked the end of his professional career. After a comeback attempt, Black went on to become a sports announcer and salesman. He died in 1959.

== Early life and minor leagues ==
Black was born in Salix, Iowa. He had his first taste of professional baseball in 1937, when he was signed by the Fairbury Jeffs of the Nebraska State League. The Jeffs were the rookie-level minor league team of the St. Louis Browns farm system. He played alongside two others who would later make the major leagues, George Bradley and Johnny Lucadello. Black pitched in 26 games for the Jeffs, posting a 5–11 record, 154 innings pitched, and a 4.85 ERA. He spent the next three years out of professional baseball, then signed a contract with the Petersburg Rebels of the Virginia League.

Black spent the 1941 and 1942 seasons with the Rebels. In 1941, he pitched in 19 games, starting 16 of them. He won 11 games, lost five, and had an ERA of 2.35. He also threw the first no-hitter of his career that season. The following season, Black pitched in 34 games for the rebels, tying for the team lead with Lou Knerr. He pitched 235 innings, winning 18 games, losing 11, and finishing with an ERA of 2.49. Black was selected for the 1942 Virginia League All-Star game, though did not attend as, instead, he was at the hospital where his wife gave birth to their second child, a daughter. He also threw the second no-hitter of his career, which led to a tryout with the Philadelphia Athletics.

== Philadelphia Athletics ==
When he was called up by the Athletics, Black worked to earn a spot on the roster in spring training. After performances which included a 2–0 victory over the University of Delaware baseball team where he struck out three in an inning, he was awarded a spot on the Athletics' roster for the 1943 Philadelphia Athletics season. That pitching rotation featured many other rookie pitchers including Jesse Flores. Black made his major league debut on April 24, 1943, and was in the Athletics' starting rotation most of the season. He had some early success in his career, pitching a one-hitter on May 30 against the St. Louis Browns in a 3–0 victory. Black finished the season with a 6–16 record, a 4.20 ERA, and 208 innings pitched. He also pitched 110 bases on balls, and hit six batters with pitches; both numbers were second highest in the American League. Black remained in the starting rotation at the beginning of the 1944 Philadelphia Athletics season, despite the possibility of him being drafted into the United States Army for World War II. He was rejected for military service after a physical examination on June 22, and remained with the team throughout the season. His win total improved from last season; however, he went a span of about a month, from June 28 until late July, without a victory. He finished the season with a 10–12 record, a 4.06 ERA, and 27 games started, second highest on the team behind Bobo Newsom. At the end of the season, there were rumors that manager Connie Mack was planning to trade Black and Frankie Hayes to Cleveland for Jim Bagby, Jr. and Jeff Heath, though Mack stated there was no substance to the rumors.

The following season, Black was part of an optimistic Athletics team, so much so that coach Earle Mack felt Black, Newsom, Flores, and Russ Christopher were the best quartet of starting pitchers in the league. He started the season being considered the ace of the staff, as the others in the rotation were either battling injury or not yet fully conditioned. His third season in the majors, however, ended with little success. Early on in the season, Black missed some playing time as a result of a badly bruised finger. He was later suspended for a month for violation of team rules. Upon his return, Connie Mack noted that it would be Black's "last chance" to avoid trouble. He finished the season with a 5–11 record and a 5.17 ERA. This was Black's final season on the Athletics. At the conclusion of the season, he was sold to the Cleveland Indians for an undisclosed amount. Connie Mack later stated he regretfully fired him due to his alcohol use, leading to him not being dependable as a pitcher.

== Cleveland Indians ==
Black began the 1946 Cleveland Indians season as a member of the roster, looking to see playing time in an established starting rotation. His season began inauspiciously when he was hit on the chin with a ball, causing him to miss a week during spring training. The 1946 season marked the first time Black did not finish on the major league roster. After pitching in 18 games for the Indians, he was sent to the Milwaukee Brewers of the American Association. While with the Brewers, Black failed to win any games, and at one point was suspended after he disappeared during a road trip. At the conclusion of the season, Indians owner Bill Veeck had a talk with Black, who admitted he had a problem with drunkenness. He agreed to spend the winter with Alcoholics Anonymous with Veek's help, and by the time the 1947 Cleveland Indians season began, Black was sober.

The year 1947 became a career year for the now-sober Black. There was optimism in the Indians clubhouse regarding his talent, with manager Lou Boudreau saying that Black was "a leading candidate for one of our starting jobs." In his first pitching appearance of the season against the Detroit Tigers, a tough 5–3 victory, someone in the press box said, "I wonder what he'd give for a slug of bourbon", to which he replied, "All I wanted in that situation was a fresh stick of chewing gum. Bourbon doesn't even tempt me." He followed this with a 1–0 shutout win against the Chicago White Sox. A game against his former team, the Philadelphia Athletics, became the highlight of his career. On July 10, 1947, Black no-hit the Athletics 3–0 at Cleveland Stadium, allowing six walks and five strikeouts in besting Bill McCahan—himself a no-hit pitcher on September 3 of that 1947 season. Only Eddie Joost came close to getting a hit on Black, hitting a ball in the eighth inning that just barely went foul. On top of his no-hit performance, Black had two singles and a squeeze bunt that day. He was modest about his performance afterwards, saying "My control was pretty bad. I got behind on a lot of hitters, but they didn't seem to hit me." Black finished the season with ten wins, 12 losses, a 3.92 ERA, eight complete games, and three shutouts. At the end of the season, he was planning to play in the Cuban Winter League along with fellow Indians Bob Feller and Al López, though this did not eventuate. During the off-season, Black returned to his hometown of Salix, where he was given a key to the city and made honorary mayor for a day.

The 1948 Cleveland Indians season began with Black maintaining a spot in the starting rotation. He had spent the off-season selling tickets for the Indians in Hot Springs, Arkansas. After signing a new contract, Black earned his first victory of 1948 on May 23 in a doubleheader against the New York Yankees, winning 5–1 in the second game. Early on in the season, due to the Indians' pitching depth, Black, along with Al Gettel and Bob Muncrief, lost their starting jobs and were moved to the bullpen, though there were plans to still use Black occasionally as a starter. He missed some playing time in June as the result of a bone chip in his left big toe, suffered during batting practice. He pitched for the Indians for most of the rest of the season, making ten starts in 18 total appearances, finishing the season with two wins and losses, a 5.37 ERA, and 52 innings pitched.

About a month before the end of the season, Black pitched his final professional baseball game. During the height of the 1948 pennant race, on September 13 in Cleveland, Black suffered a cerebral hemorrhage while batting in the second inning during a home game against the St. Louis Browns. He had fouled off a pitch into the upper deck of the stadium, and then collapsed holding onto his neck. He was able to walk to the dugout, but had lost consciousness by the time an ambulance arrived. An image of Black holding his head has often been falsely attributed to Ray Chapman, who was killed from being hit in the head by a pitch in 1920. Black was taken to St. Vincent Charity Hospital and was conscious for a time, but lapsed into a coma. His doctor noted that he was likely to make a full recovery, though he was "through with baseball for this year and possibly for good." After a few days in critical condition, he had begun to recover and his condition was reported to have improved greatly.

In response to Black's injury, the Indians hosted a "Don Black Night" on September 23 in a game against the Boston Red Sox to help raise money for his medical bills. In that game, watched by 76,772 fans, the Indians raised $40,370 for Black as they won the game, 5–2. The Indians went on to defeat the Red Sox in a one-game playoff for the American League pennant and the Boston Braves in six games in the 1948 World Series as Black recovered in the hospital. After the Indians won the World Series, Lou Boudreau said that the Indians won the title in his honor.

== Later life ==
After a stay of six weeks, Black was released from the hospital in late October 1948. He continued to suffer from headaches, however, and had to have further surgery done in December to remove a weak spot in an artery near his head. He was released from the hospital shortly afterward, but by the start of 1949 his time with the Indians was over, as Veeck stated he would not accept the responsibility of allowing Black to pitch again, though said "If Black is determined to try it again, I won't stand in his way." This statement, however, did not keep Black away, as he signed a contract in late January with the Indians for the same amount as the previous season. After pitching with the Indians in Florida in spring training, he returned to Cleveland and decided to retire temporarily, citing that he felt too weak to be effective. He made one final pitching appearance before retiring in an exhibition game against the Pittsburgh Pirates on July 13, pitching two innings for the Indians in a 1–0 loss.

After his retirement from baseball, Black went on to become a sportscaster, automobile salesman and insurance salesman. He lived with his wife, Joyce, and his two daughters, Stevie and Donna, in Cuyahoga Falls, Ohio. In December 1957, Black was injured in a car accident in Virginia, leaving him in critical condition. He recovered and spent the summer of 1958 teaching for the city recreation department. The following year, on April 21, 1959, Black died in Cuyahoga Falls while watching an Indians game at his home.

== See also ==
- List of Major League Baseball no-hitters

Achievements
Preceded by Ewell Blackwell	No-hitter pitcher July 10, 1947	Succeeded by Bill McCahan
