= Bill Miller (right-handed pitcher) =

American baseball player (1910–1982)

- Pitcher
- Born: April 12, 1910; Hannibal, Missouri, U.S.
- Died: February 26, 1982 (aged 71); Hannibal, Missouri, U.S.
- Batted: Right Threw: Right

MLB debut
- October 2, 1937, for the St. Louis Browns

Last MLB appearance
- October 2, 1937, for the St. Louis Browns

MLB statistics
- Win–loss record: 0–1
- Earned run average: 13.50
- Strikeouts: 1
- Stats at Baseball Reference

Teams
- St. Louis Browns (1937)

William Francis Miller (April 12, 1910 – February 26, 1982) was an American professional baseball pitcher who worked in minor league baseball from 1936 through 1940; playing for such teams as the San Antonio Missions, the Hollywood Stars, and the Springfield Browns. He also played in one major league game on October 2, 1937, for the St. Louis Browns.

== Biography ==
William Francis Miller was born on April 12, 1910, in Hannibal, Missouri. He was a well-known local baseball player in Hannibal as a pitcher and outfielder. In 1935, he pitched in two games for the Mexico All-Stars when they went to Moberly, Missouri, to play the Moberly Merchants. Miller then played in the Texas League for the San Antonio Missions, a farm team of the St. Louis Browns, from 1936 to 1937. He pitched in 25 games, starting 11, in 1936 and missed some time due to a sore arm. In May 1937, he was activated from the team's ineligible list. He finished the year with 24 games pitched, and 18 starts, for San Antonio while posting an 8–9 win-loss record and a 3.38 earned run average.

On September 15, 1937, the Browns purchased Miller from the Missions. Miller made his major league debut, and first start, on October 2, 1937, against the Chicago White Sox. He retired the first five batters he faced but ended up leaving the game after giving up six earned runs in four innings. In February 1938, Miller signed a contract with the Browns for the 1938 season.

On April 5, 1938, the Browns optioned Miller to the Hollywood Stars of the Pacific Coast League. He pitched in 14 games for the Stars in 1938. He finished the 1938 season with the Toledo Mud Hens of the American Association.

Miller returned to the Missions in 1939, but missed most of the year due to a serious illness. In February 1940, the Browns invited Miller back to spring training, stating that they "have every assurance that Miller has regained his health and with it his possibilities as a pitcher." However, Miller did not make the major league roster and played the 1940 season with the Springfield Browns of the Illinois–Indiana–Iowa League.

Miller died on February 26, 1982, in Hannibal at the age of 71. He was buried at Hannibal's Holy Family Cemetery. During his baseball career, he was noted for his good looks.
