= Salix, Iowa =

- City
- Location of Salix, Iowa
- Coordinates: 42°19′17″N 96°18′56″W
- Country: USA
- State: Iowa
- County: Woodbury

Area
  - Total: 1.71 sq mi (4.43 km^{2})
  - Land: 1.70 sq mi (4.40 km^{2})
  - Water: 0.012 sq mi (0.03 km^{2})
- Elevation: 1,083 ft (330 m)

Population (2020)
  - Total: 295
  - Density: 173.7/sq mi (67.07/km^{2})
- Time zone: UTC-6 (Central (CST))
  - Summer (DST): UTC-5 (CDT)
- ZIP code: 51052
- Area code: 712
- FIPS code: 19-70320
- GNIS feature ID: 2396530
- Website: salixiowa.com

Salix is a city in Woodbury County, Iowa, United States. It is part of the Sioux City, IA–NE–SD Metropolitan Statistical Area. The population was 295 at the time of the 2020 census.

== History ==
A post office called Salix has been in operation since 1874. The city was named from the grove willows (or salix) near the original town site.

== Geography ==
According to the United States Census Bureau, the city has a total area of 1.53 square miles (3.96 km^{2}), of which 1.52 square miles (3.94 km^{2}) is land and 0.01 square miles (0.03 km^{2}) is water. Salix is located on the floodplain of the Missouri River, near Interstate 29. Brown's Lake/Bigelow County Park and Snyder Bend County Park are nearby.

== Demographics ==
Historical populations
Year	Pop.	±%
1900	387	—
1910	390	+0.8%
1920	396	+1.5%
1930	374	−5.6%
1940	392	+4.8%
1950	337	−14.0%
1960	394	+16.9%
1970	387	−1.8%
1980	429	+10.9%
1990	367	−14.5%
2000	370	+0.8%
2010	363	−1.9%
2020	295	−18.7%
Source:"U.S. Census website". United States Census Bureau. and Iowa Data Center; Source: U.S. Decennial Census

=== 2020 census ===
As of the census of 2020, there were 295 people, 134 households, and 69 families residing in the city. The population density was 173.7 inhabitants per square mile (67.1/km^{2}). There were 146 housing units at an average density of 86.0 per square mile (33.2/km^{2}). The racial makeup of the city was 94.9% White, 0.0% Black or African American, 0.0% Native American, 0.3% Asian, 0.0% Pacific Islander, 0.7% from other races and 4.1% from two or more races. Hispanic or Latino persons of any race comprised 2.0% of the population.

Of the 134 households, 27.6% of which had children under the age of 18 living with them, 35.8% were married couples living together, 10.4% were cohabitating couples, 23.9% had a female householder with no spouse or partner present and 29.9% had a male householder with no spouse or partner present. 48.5% of all households were non-families. 38.8% of all households were made up of individuals, 11.9% had someone living alone who was 65 years old or older.

The median age in the city was 45.5 years. 23.1% of the residents were under the age of 20; 3.7% were between the ages of 20 and 24; 22.7% were from 25 and 44; 32.2% were from 45 and 64; and 18.3% were 65 years of age or older. The gender makeup of the city was 54.2% male and 45.8% female.

=== 2010 census ===
As of the census of 2010, there were 363 people, 153 households, and 91 families living in the city. The population density was 238.8 inhabitants per square mile (92.2/km^{2}). There were 167 housing units at an average density of 109.9 per square mile (42.4/km^{2}). The racial makeup of the city was 95.0% White, 0.6% Native American, 1.7% Asian, and 2.8% from two or more races. Hispanic or Latino of any race were 1.1% of the population.

There were 153 households, of which 33.3% had children under the age of 18 living with them, 40.5% were married couples living together, 11.8% had a female householder with no husband present, 7.2% had a male householder with no wife present, and 40.5% were non-families. 30.1% of all households were made up of individuals, and 12.4% had someone living alone who was 65 years of age or older. The average household size was 2.37 and the average family size was 2.92.

The median age in the city was 38.3 years. 25.3% of residents were under the age of 18; 7.8% were between the ages of 18 and 24; 24.3% were from 25 to 44; 30% were from 45 to 64; and 12.7% were 65 years of age or older. The gender makeup of the city was 47.7% male and 52.3% female.

=== 2000 census ===
As of the census of 2000, there were 370 people, 154 households, and 97 families living in the city. The population density was 554.4 inhabitants per square mile (214.1/km^{2}). There were 160 housing units at an average density of 239.7 per square mile (92.5/km^{2}). The racial makeup of the city was 100.00% White.

There were 154 households, out of which 31.2% had children under the age of 18 living with them, 51.9% were married couples living together, 7.8% had a female householder with no husband present, and 36.4% were non-families. 34.4% of all households were made up of individuals, and 14.3% had someone living alone who was 65 years of age or older. The average household size was 2.40 and the average family size was 3.11.

28.9% are under the age of 18, 3.2% from 18 to 24, 32.4% from 25 to 44, 17.8% from 45 to 64, and 17.6% who were 65 years of age or older. The median age was 36 years. For every 100 females, there were 89.7 males. For every 100 females age 18 and over, there were 93.4 males.

The median income for a household in the city was $27,396, and the median income for a family was $37,500. Males had a median income of $30,250 versus $21,250 for females. The per capita income for the city was $15,242. About 5.2% of families and 9.4% of the population were below the poverty line, including 10.1% of those under age 18 and 5.5% of those age 65 or over.

== Notable person ==
- Don Black, pro baseball pitcher, best known for throwing a no-hitter on July 10, 1947.
