= Steve Swetonic =

American baseball player (1903–1974)

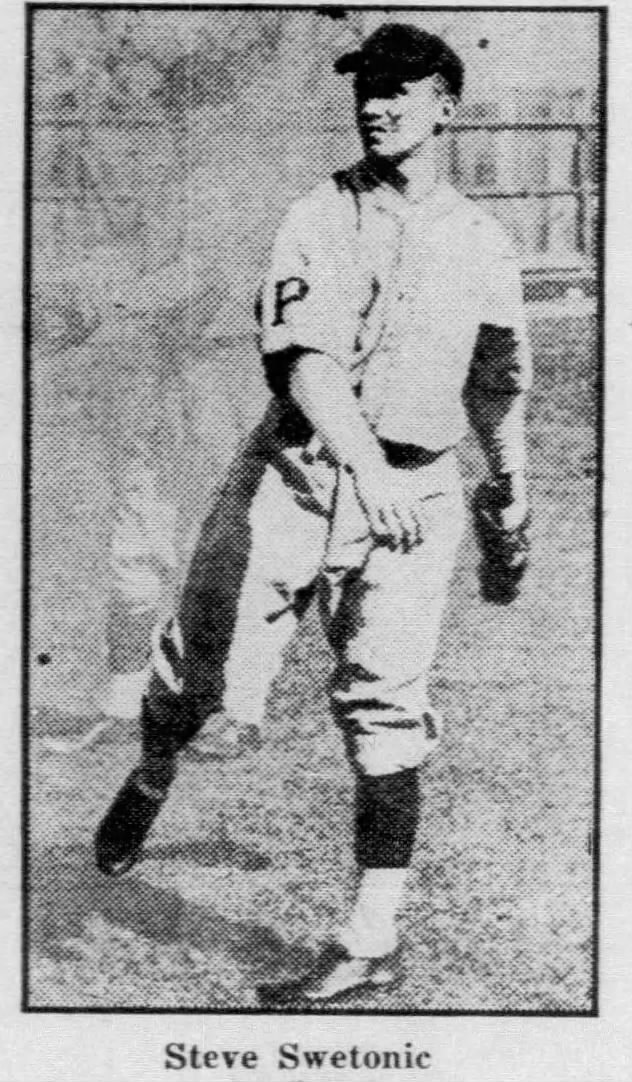
- Pitcher
- Born: August 13, 1903; Mount Pleasant, Pennsylvania
- Died: April 22, 1974 (aged 70); Canonsburg, Pennsylvania
- Batted: Right Threw: Right

MLB debut
- April 17, 1929, for the Pittsburgh Pirates

Last MLB appearance
- May 19, 1935, for the Pittsburgh Pirates

MLB statistics
- Win–loss record: 37–36
- Earned run average: 3.81
- Strikeouts: 154
- Stats at Baseball Reference

Teams
- Pittsburgh Pirates (1929–1933, 1935)

Stephen Albert Swetonic (August 13, 1903 – April 22, 1974) was a pitcher in Major League Baseball, who played his entire career for the Pittsburgh Pirates from 1929 through 1935. Swetonic batted and threw right-handed. He was born in Mount Pleasant, Pennsylvania.

Swetonic provided solid support for the Pirates' pitching staffs of the early 1930s that included Larry French, Burleigh Grimes, Waite Hoyt, and Ray Kremer. His most productive season came in 1932, when he went 11–6 with a career-high 2.82 ERA and tied for the National League lead with four shutouts. In 1933, he recorded career-numbers in wins (12), starts (21), and innings pitched (164 2/3 ). Swetonic's career ended prematurely at the age of 31 because of a chronic sore arm.

Swetonic went to spring training with the Boston Braves in 1934, but did not play in the regular season. In a March 24 game against the Philadelphia Athletics, in St. Petersburg, Florida, he yielded four runs in the first inning. In March 1935, Swetonic was in spring training with the New York Giants team in Miami Beach, Florida. He tossed the final three innings of an intrasquad game between teams captained by Carl Hubbell and Freddie Fitzsimmons on February 28.

In a five-season career, Swetonic posted a 37–36 record with 154 strikeouts and a 3.81 ERA in 595 1/3 innings. He died in Canonsburg, Pennsylvania, at age 70.

== Fact ==
- As of 2006, Swetonic has one of the lowest ERA (3.81) of any major league pitcher coming out of University of Pittsburgh with more than 100 innings, behind Bob Malloy (3.26) and Doc Medich (3.77).
