= Fountain Bluff =

Range of hills in the United States

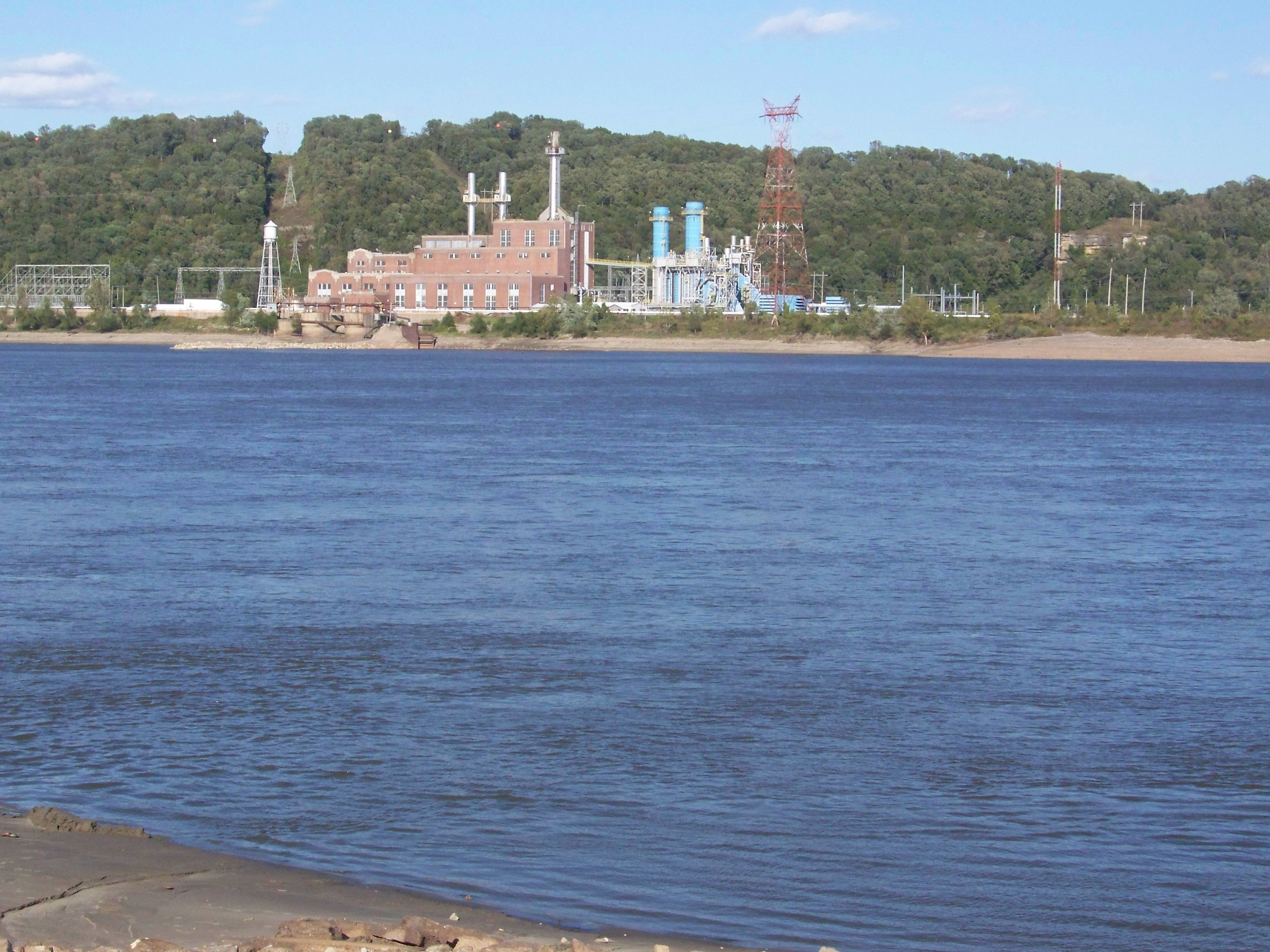
- Grand Tower Energy Center viewed from the Missouri side of the Mississippi River, with Fountain Bluff behind it.

Highest point
- Elevation: 779 ft (237 m)
- Prominence: 419 ft (128 m)
- Isolation: 6.26 mi (10.07 km)
- Coordinates: 37°40′53″N 89°30′26″W

Geography
- Location within Illinois
- Location: Jackson County, Illinois, United States

Climbing
- Access: Happy Hollow Road off IL 3

Fountain Bluff is a large, isolated range of hills located in the floodplain of the Mississippi River, on the river's east bank in Fountain Bluff Township, Illinois. Its unusual geographic location was a result of glaciation during the previous Ice Age. It is known for its high steep sandstone cliffs along the river, its biodiversity and abundant Native American rock art.

Fountain Bluff is named for the numerous natural springs within its hills. There is also a large spring called the "Fountain" on the north side of the hills. Fountain Bluff is sometimes called Big Hill by locals with the name "Fountain Bluff" referring to the sandstone cliffs themselves.

== Physical characteristics ==
Fountain Bluff is located in western Jackson County between the Illinois towns of Gorham to the north and Grand Tower to the south, and across the river from Wittenberg, Missouri. Tower Rock, a major Mississippi River landmark, is also located nearby. Here, the Mississippi River is squeezed into a narrow channel between Fountain Bluff and the Missouri shore, where it forms bedrock rapids. During an 1864 survey the range from low to high water was determined to be 44 feet (13 m). The 478 megawatt Grand Tower Energy Center is located next to the Mississippi River at the base of Fountain Bluff. The hill is part of the Shawnee National Forest with the exception of a small portion of private property.

The hill is about 4 miles (6.4 km) long and up to 1.5 miles (2.4 km) wide, covering 3,800 acres (1,500 ha). The highest elevation on Fountain Bluff is 779 feet (237 m) near the north end, which is more than 400 feet (120 m) above the level of the Mississippi River valley. Illinois Route 3 follows an alignment along the eastern edge of Fountain Bluff; the Big Muddy River, a tributary of the Mississippi, flows a short distance to the east. A fire tower, open to the public, was long located on the summit and offered "a far-flung view of Illinois and Missouri, of the hills and the river, the fields, forests and farms of the vast bottom lands." As of 1985, the tower was reported to have been dismantled.

In the 1939 Illinois: A Descriptive and Historical Guide Fountain Bluff is described as a "freak formation... which juts from the level flood plain like a huge loaf on a table top." The west and south sides of Fountain Bluff are flanked by sandstone cliffs 70 to 80 feet (21 to 24 m) high. The rest consists of wooded hills interspersed with large rock formations: "some sections are as smooth as polished ivory; others are rough and fissured. Large expanses are covered with lichens, moss and small-leaved vines." The area is dotted with small streams, waterfalls and natural springs, and many caves and rock shelters are formed in the exposed sandstone. There are two named streams flowing from the summit: Trestle Hollow and Happy Hollow.

Due to its geographic isolation (despite its relatively low topographic prominence, it can be considered a minor sky island), the Fountain Bluff has been described as a "refugium for an assemblage of uncommon plants and animals". The northern harebell (Campanula rotundifolia) has been recorded to grow here, far south of its normal range; it may have become established here during the Wisconsinian glaciations. Mohlenbrock (1975) recorded a total of 991 taxa of plants. The major plant communities on Fountain Bluff are found in floodplain woods/swamps, "limestone woods" (established on shallow soil over limestone), mesic woods, "hill prairies" at exposed summits, and cliff faces.

== Geology ==
Although it is located east of the Mississippi River, Fountain Bluff was once part of the west bank of the Mississippi valley. During the Wisconsinian Ice Age period from 85,000 to 11,000 years ago, the Cordilleran Ice Sheet advanced over much of North America and blocked the main channel of the Mississippi River. Swollen with glacial meltwater, the Mississippi River was forced to rise and carve a new channel to the west. When the ice sheet retreated, Fountain Bluff was left as an isolated "island" in the middle of the valley. During periods of heavy glacial melt, Fountain Bluff would have been a true island surrounded with water on all sides. After the ice was gone, the Mississippi may have changed course multiple times to flow around the west or east sides of Fountain Bluff, although it is currently locked in the deeper western channel. The Big Muddy River flows through the original Mississippi valley to the east as an underfit stream.

The west and south edges of Fountain Bluff consists of exposed rock bluffs created by erosion from the Mississippi River. The hills are composed of Upper Chesterian limestone overlaid by Lower Pennsylvanian (Caseyville Formation) sandstone. Sandstone comprises most of the exposed (visible) strata. A smaller sandstone formation known as the "Devil's Bake Oven", which includes a natural arch, is located downstream and was formed from the same rock and glacial action that created Fountain Bluff. Two fault zones, the Pomona to the north and the Rattlesnake Ferry to the south, cross the area.

== History ==
=== Indigenous peoples ===
Native Americans of the Mississippian culture inhabited the area between 850 and 1500 AD. Archaeologists believe that petroglyphs found at Fountain Bluff were carved sometime between 1000 and 1250 AD. Rock carvings at Fountain Bluff were mentioned as early as the late 19th century, though they did not come to widespread public attention until 1953, when a group of volunteers led by local archaeologist Irvin Peithmann trespassed on private property and cleared a trail to a rock shelter on the north end of Fountain Bluff where over 40 carvings were publicly discovered without the owner's knowledge or permission. It is believed that these carvings are related to ceremonial activities around the time of the spring equinox. Known as Painted Rock, the site has been damaged by Peithmann and vandalism since its discovery; however, most of the petroglyphs remain intact. These petroglyphs are on private property and are not open to the public. Another "solstitial observatory" petroglyph site has been found in Trestle Hollow on the west side of Fountain Bluff.

"These carvings include encircled crosses and swastikas, concentric circles, queer eyes that seem to look past or through the visitor, geometric designs that may be attempts to make a map, and also arms and hands of mysterious significance. In addition to these shallow carvings, there is a great scooped-out place that some think was made for a throne.

One who stands at the proper place near these carvings, finds that the rocky walls of the bluff serve as a kind of amplifier that gathers sounds from the Missouri shore more than half a mile away and makes them audible. The rippling of water around jetties on the Missouri side and the sound of voices there are easily heard. One wonders if perchance the Indians stopped at the same spot, heard similar sounds, thought it the abode of a great spirit, and therefore set it aside as a shrine."

–John W. Allen (2010), Legends and Lore of Southern Illinois

=== After 1800 ===
The Kaskaskia people lived in the area during the initial period of European settlement. On August 13, 1803, the Kaskaskia officially ceded their traditional lands to the US government and received a reservation at Sand Ridge, about 3 miles (4.8 km) northeast of Fountain Bluff. They lived here until 1832 when the federal government relocated them to reservations in Kansas. In the 1830s, white immigrants (many of German origin) began to settle in the Fountain Bluff area.

During the 1870s, Fountain Bluff was considered as a site for a Mississippi River bridge due to the narrowness of the river channel in this area. In 1917 the Illinois Rivers and Lakes Commission proposed the construction of a canal, lock and dam connecting the Mississippi and Big Muddy Rivers at Fountain Bluff, mainly for the purpose of transporting coal from the Southern Illinois coal fields. The project would have cost $1 million ($25.1 million in 2025 dollars). Fountain Bluff forms a natural barrier to floodwaters of the Mississippi River and is part of the U.S. Army Corps of Engineers Degognia and Fountain Bluff Levee and Drainage District, which protects about 51,000 acres (21,000 ha) of farmland from flooding.

In the early 1900s, Fountain Bluff was a popular recreation area, "the best known and most visited picnic area in southern Illinois." The now defunct Illinois Central Railroad ran 270-mile (430 km) weekend excursion trains from Chicago to Fountain Bluff. However, the area has declined in popularity over the years. Before and during the Great Depression, Jackson County saw a large decrease in population as rural citizens moved to urban areas. Today, Fountain Bluff is "virtually unknown to tourists."

During the Depression, the Civilian Conservation Corps established Camp Glenn (November 1933–April 1937) next to Fountain Bluff and was occupied by 174 men engaged in road and bridge building and other construction work. Fountain Bluff's abundant sandstone was quarried for use in many CCC projects, and a major rock crushing facility was established here. The fire lookout tower that for many years stood atop Fountain Bluff was built by CCC crews in 1933. By the 1960s, the tower and others in the region were functionally obsolete, their use having largely been superseded by aircraft.

Several hiking trails still exist in the area today, including the one providing access to the petroglyphs.
