= Fountain Bluff Township, Jackson County, Illinois =

Fountain Bluff Township
- Township
- Location in Jackson County

- Jackson County's location in Illinois
- Coordinates: 37°44′41″N 89°32′10″W
- Country: United States
- State: Illinois
- County: Jackson
- Established: November 4, 1884

Area
  - Total: 31.13 sq mi (80.6 km^{2})
  - Land: 29.95 sq mi (77.6 km^{2})
  - Water: 1.18 sq mi (3.1 km^{2}) 3.79%
- Elevation: 360 ft (110 m)

Population (2020)
  - Total: 204
  - Density: 6.81/sq mi (2.63/km^{2})
- Time zone: UTC-6 (CST)
  - Summer (DST): UTC-5 (CDT)
- ZIP codes: 62907, 62940, 62942, 62950
- FIPS code: 17-077-27260

Fountain Bluff Township is one of sixteen townships in Jackson County, Illinois, USA. As of the 2020 census, its population was 204 and it contained 94 housing units. It includes Fountain Bluff, a range of hills.

== Geography ==
According to the 2021 census gazetteer files, Fountain Bluff Township has a total area of 31.13 square miles (80.63 km^{2}), of which 29.95 square miles (77.57 km^{2}) (or 96.21%) is land and 1.18 square miles (3.06 km^{2}) (or 3.79%) is water.

=== Unincorporated towns ===
- Jacob at 37.745051°N 89.537042°W
- Neunert at 37.722829°N 89.545654°W
- Raddle at 37.778940°N 89.586766°W

(This list is based on USGS data and may include former settlements.)

=== Adjacent townships ===
- Kinkaid Township (north)
- Levan Township (northeast)
- Sand Ridge Township (east)
- Grand Tower Township (southeast)
- Degognia Township (northwest)
- Gorham

=== Cemeteries ===
The township contains Neunert Cemetery. Goodbread Cemetery. Boone Cemetery.

=== Major highways ===
- Illinois Route 3

== Demographics ==
As of the 2020 census there were 204 people, 65 households, and 45 families residing in the township. The population density was 6.55 inhabitants per square mile (2.53/km^{2}). There were 94 housing units at an average density of 3.02 per square mile (1.17/km^{2}). The racial makeup of the township was 92.65% White, 1.96% African American, 0.98% Native American, 0.00% Asian, 0.00% Pacific Islander, 0.98% from other races, and 3.43% from two or more races. Hispanic or Latino of any race were 3.92% of the population.

There were 65 households, out of which 44.60% had children under the age of 18 living with them, 69.23% were married couples living together, 0.00% had a female householder with no spouse present, and 30.77% were non-families. 30.80% of all households were made up of individuals, and 30.80% had someone living alone who was 65 years of age or older. The average household size was 2.20 and the average family size was 2.73.

The township's age distribution consisted of 25.2% under the age of 18, 0.0% from 18 to 24, 23.1% from 25 to 44, 11.9% from 45 to 64, and 39.9% who were 65 years of age or older. The median age was 52.3 years. For every 100 females, there were 257.5 males. For every 100 females age 18 and over, there were 167.5 males.

The median income for a household in the township was $99,539, and the median income for a family was $98,224. Males had a median income of $52,112 versus $37,143 for females. The per capita income for the township was $53,124. None of the population were below the poverty line.

Historical population
Census	Pop.	Note	%±
2000	276		—
2010	208		−24.6%
2020	204		−1.9%
U.S. Decennial Census

== School districts ==
- Murphysboro Community Unit School District 186
- Trico Community Unit School District 176

== Political districts ==
- Illinois' 12th congressional district
- State House District 115
- State Senate District 58
