= Frankie Pack =

American baseball player (1928-2000)

- Pinch hitter
- Born: April 10, 1928; Morristown, Tennessee, U.S.
- Died: January 26, 2000 (aged 71); Hendersonville, North Carolina, U.S.
- Batted: Left Threw: Right

MLB debut
- June 5, 1949, for the St. Louis Browns

Last MLB appearance
- June 5, 1949, for the St. Louis Browns

MLB statistics
- Games played: 1
- At bats: 1
- Hits: 0
- Stats at Baseball Reference

Teams
- St. Louis Browns (1949)

Frank Pack (April 10, 1928 – January 26, 2000) was an American Major League Baseball player who pinch hit in one game for the St. Louis Browns on June 5, 1949.
