= Tod Davis =

American baseball player

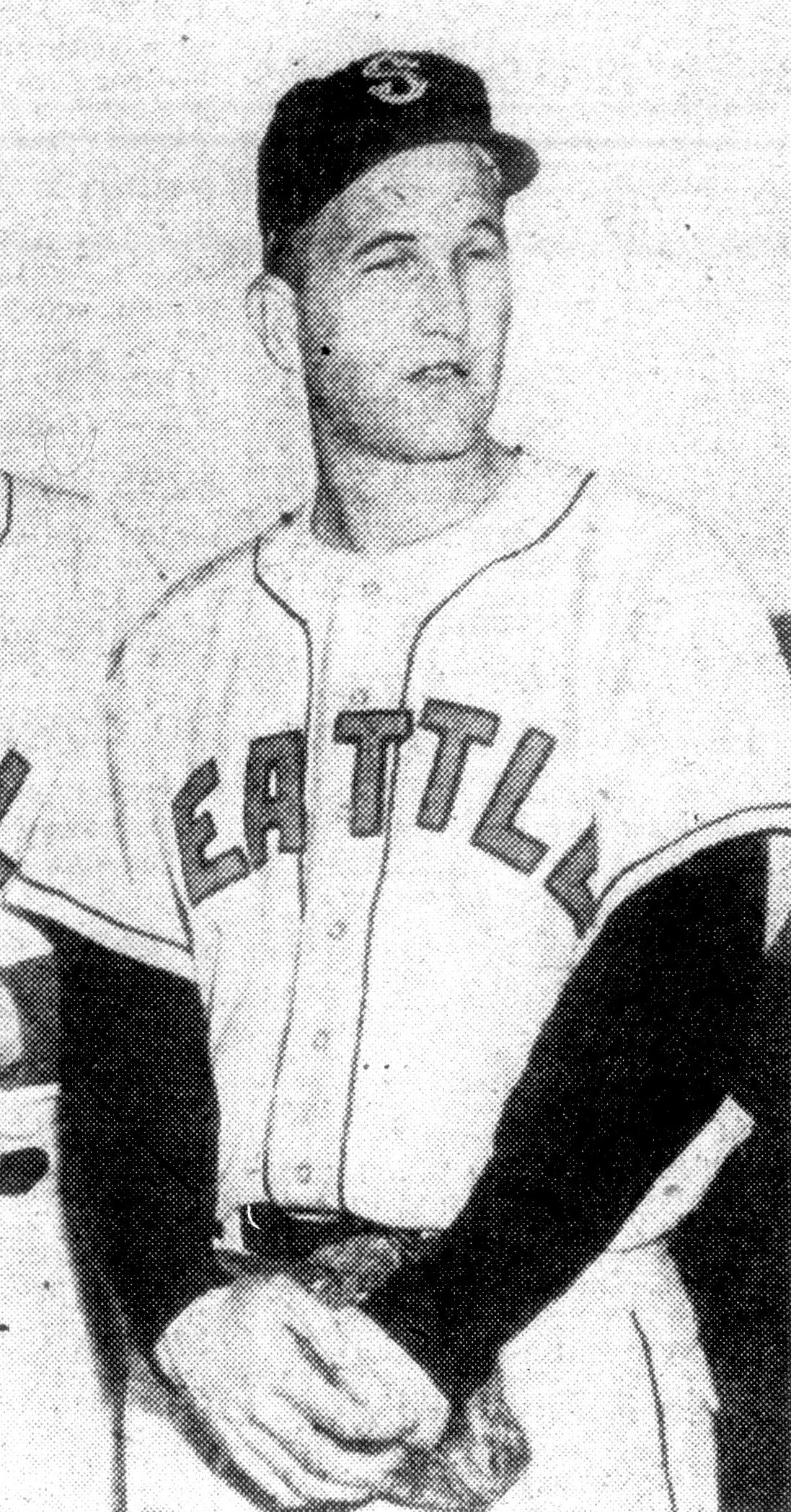
- Davis in 1950
- Infielder
- Born: July 24, 1924; Los Angeles
- Died: December 31, 1978 (aged 54); West Covina, California
- Batted: Right Threw: Right

MLB debut
- April 27, 1949, for the Philadelphia Athletics

Last MLB appearance
- May 15, 1951, for the Philadelphia Athletics

MLB statistics
- Batting average: .233
- Home runs: 1
- Runs batted in: 6
- Stats at Baseball Reference

Teams
- Philadelphia Athletics (1949, 1951)

Thomas Oscar "Tod" Davis (July 24, 1924 – December 31, 1978) was an American professional baseball player of the 1940s and 1950s. The native of Los Angeles appeared in 42 games as an infielder and pinch hitter in Major League Baseball during the 1949 and 1951 seasons for the Philadelphia Athletics. Davis was 6 feet 2 inches (1.88 m) tall, weighed 190 pounds (86 kg) and threw and batted right-handed.

During his trials with the Athletics, Davis collected 21 hits. His only big-league home run, hit September 5, 1949, came off Vic Raschi of the New York Yankees at Shibe Park during a 13–4 New York victory. The remainder of Davis' nine-year career (1943–1944; 1947–1953) was spent in the top-level Pacific Coast League. He appeared in 782 games in the PCL for both Los Angeles–based teams, the Angels and the Hollywood Stars, as well as for the Seattle Rainiers.

Davis served in the United States Army during World War II and its aftermath, and missed the 1945–46 seasons. Davis died on December 31, 1978. He was interred at Rose Hills Memorial Park.
