= Al Naples =

American baseball player (1926–2021)

- Shortstop
- Born: August 29, 1926; Staten Island, New York, U.S.
- Died: February 26, 2021 (aged 94)
- Batted: Right Threw: Right

MLB debut
- June 25, 1949, for the St. Louis Browns

Last MLB appearance
- July 26, 1949, for the St. Louis Browns

MLB statistics
- Games played: 2
- At bats: 7
- Hits: 1
- Stats at Baseball Reference

Teams
- St. Louis Browns (1949)

Aloysius Francis Naples (August 29, 1926 – February 26, 2021) was an American Major League Baseball shortstop who played for the St. Louis Browns in 1949. He is one of about 200 players in major league history to be credited with exactly one base hit.

I ran like all get-out when I poked that double down the right field line for my first hit in the Big Show. I felt rather good after that.

— Al Naples, One Hit Wonders: Baseball Stories (George Rose)

Naples was born in Staten Island, New York and attended Georgetown University, where he majored in Latin, from 1946 to 1949. He signed a professional contract with the St. Louis Browns in 1949 and made his major league debut, starting against the Boston Red Sox on June 26, 1949. Naples had one hit, a double to right field, against Boston ace Mel Parnell (who won 25 games that year, including Naples' debut).

Naples sat on the bench for a month (the Browns already had Eddie Pellagrini and John Sullivan to play shortstop), then started one more game and was sent down to the Class B Springfield Browns of the Three-I League. That year, Naples hit .232 with no home runs in 56 games for Springfield, who finished last and folded after the season. On October 21, 1949, Naples was released unconditionally by the Browns.

He signed with the Browns' other Class B affiliate, the Wichita Falls Spudders of the Big State League for the 1950 season but did not play for the Spudders that year or for any other professional team afterwards; at age 23, his professional baseball career was over.

Naples died on February 26, 2021, at the age of 94.
