= Irv Medlinger =

American baseball player (1927-1975)

- Pitcher
- Born: June 18, 1927; Chicago
- Died: September 3, 1975 (aged 48); Wheeling, Illinois
- Batted: Left Threw: Left

MLB debut
- April 20, 1949, for the St. Louis Browns

Last MLB appearance
- September 28, 1951, for the St. Louis Browns

MLB statistics
- Win–loss record: 0–0
- Earned run average: 13.83
- Strikeouts: 9
- Stats at Baseball Reference

Teams
- St. Louis Browns (1949, 1951)

Irving John Medlinger (June 18, 1927 – September 3, 1975) was a professional baseball player. He was a left-handed pitcher over parts of two seasons (1949, 1951) with the St. Louis Browns. For his career, he did not record a decision, with a 13.83 earned run average, and 9 strikeouts in 13.2 innings pitched.

He was born in Chicago. He was one of two people killed aboard a Piper PA-24 Comanche destroyed on September 3, 1975, while attempting a landing near Wheeling, Illinois, after its engine failed. He died at the age of 48.
