= Bob Dillinger =

American baseball player (1918–2009)

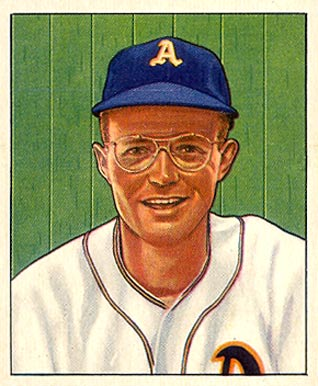
- Third baseman
- Born: September 17, 1918; Glendale, California, U.S.
- Died: November 7, 2009 (aged 91); Santa Clarita, California, U.S.
- Batted: Right Threw: Right

MLB debut
- April 16, 1946, for the St. Louis Browns

Last MLB appearance
- September 28, 1951, for the Chicago White Sox

MLB statistics
- Batting average: .306
- Home runs: 10
- Runs batted in: 213
- Stolen bases: 106
- Stats at Baseball Reference

Teams
- St. Louis Browns (1946–1949); Philadelphia Athletics (1950); Pittsburgh Pirates (1950–1951); Chicago White Sox (1951)

Career highlights and awards
- All-Star (1949); 3× AL stolen base leader (1947–1949)

Robert Bernard Dillinger (September 17, 1918 – November 7, 2009) was an American professional baseball third baseman who appeared in 753 games in the major leagues (MLB) from 1946 through 1951 for the St. Louis Browns, Philadelphia Athletics, Pittsburgh Pirates and Chicago White Sox. Dillinger's six years in the major leagues showcased his batting ability (he led the American League in hits in 1948 with 207 and batted over .300 four times) and his speed (he was the Junior Circuit's stolen base champion for three consecutive years, 1947 through 1949, with 82 total thefts), but poor defense and a perceived lackadaisical attitude resulted in a premature end to his big-league tenure. He threw and batted right-handed, stood 5 feet 11 inches (1.80 m) tall and weighed 170 pounds (77 kg).

== Early life ==
Born in Glendale, California, and nicknamed "Duke", Dillinger attended the University of Idaho in Moscow and played football for the Vandals, but broke his collarbone as a freshman in 1936 and was injured again as a sophomore; he left the school in the spring of 1938. He was signed by the Browns as an amateur free agent in 1939, then hit over .300 in three of his four minor-league seasons before his playing career was interrupted by World War II service in the United States Army Air Forces from 1943 through 1945.

== Baseball career ==
In 1946, the first postwar season, Dillinger made the Browns' MLB roster as the backup to veteran third baseman Mark Christman, starting 50 games at the hot corner and batting .307. Just prior to the 1947 campaign, the Browns made room for Dillinger by selling Christman's contract to the Washington Senators.

In his first season as a regular, Dillinger led his team in hits (168) and his league in stolen bases (34). Then, in 1948, he batted .321, with his AL-best 207 hits including 34 doubles and ten triples. His 28 stolen bases enabled him to repeat as the American League's base-stealing king. The following year, Dillinger batted a career-best .324, stole 20 more bags (again the league's best), and was selected to the 1949 American League All-Star team. In the midsummer classic, played at Ebbets Field on July 12, Dillinger entered the contest in the sixth inning as a pinch runner for George Kell. He displayed his speed by scoring from first base on a double by Joe DiMaggio to help the AL increase its lead to 8–5. Staying in the game at third base, he came to bat in the seventh inning and singled off Howie Pollet, driving in Dom DiMaggio, and then scored a run himself when he again tallied from first base on a double, this time hit by Dale Mitchell. The American League went on to win, 11–7, with Dillinger scoring two runs and collecting a key run batted in.

That off-season, however, Dillinger was traded away from the Browns, as he and Paul Lehner were swapped to the Philadelphia Athletics for four players and $100,000. The Athletics had finished eight games over .500 in 1949, the team's third straight winning season. Philadelphia had briefly contended for the American League pennant in 1948. The 1950 season would mark Connie Mack's 50th year as the team's manager, and the Athletics acquired top-calibre talent like Dillinger to try to put Mack over the top. But 1950 was a disaster for the Athletics. Instead of contending for first place, they fell into the league's cellar, and were only 29–57 on July 20, 1950. That day, despite his .309 batting average in 84 games, Philadelphia obtained waivers on Dillinger and sold his contract to the National League's last-place team, the Pittsburgh Pirates. Dillinger batted .288 in 58 games for the Bucs, to finish the campaign at .301. He split 1951 between Pittsburgh and the Chicago White Sox, and matched that .301 average in 101 games played. It was his last year in the majors.

He played his last four professional seasons (1952–55) in the Pacific Coast League, where he moved to the outfield and led the league in hitting with a .366 mark in 1953. Dillinger's career as an active player ended when he was given his unconditional release from the Sacramento Solons on May 25, 1955, despite being the team's second-best batter with a .281 average. Upon his departure, he bitterly criticized Tony Freitas whom he called "the worst manager I ever played for in 16 years in the game."

As an excellent contact hitter, his career MLB batting average was .306. He amassed 888 hits, with 123 doubles, 47 triples and ten home runs in 3,201 plate appearances. He stole 106 bases, and was caught stealing 50 times. In the field, he experienced problems throwing the ball to first base, and was criticized regularly for lack of effort in fielding ground balls—a charge that Dillinger strongly contested.

== Retirement ==
In retirement, he returned to Southern California and served as a construction inspector for the city of Los Angeles. Bob Dillinger died on November 7, 2009, at age 91 in Santa Clarita, California.

== See also ==
- List of Major League Baseball annual stolen base leaders
