= Chet Johnson =

American baseball player (1917–1983)

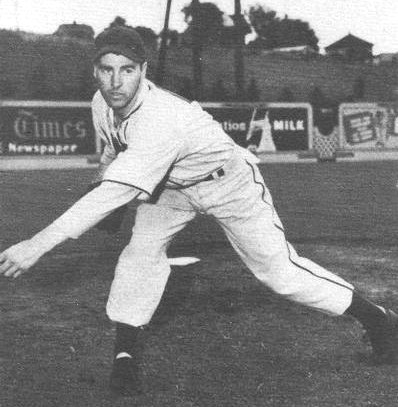
- Pitcher
- Born: August 1, 1917; Redmond, Washington, U.S.
- Died: April 10, 1983 (aged 65); Seattle, Washington, U.S.
- Batted: Left Threw: Left

MLB debut
- September 12, 1946, for the St. Louis Browns

Last MLB appearance
- September 29, 1946, for the St. Louis Browns

MLB statistics
- Win–loss record: 0–0
- Earned run average: 5.00
- Strikeouts: 8
- Stats at Baseball Reference

Teams
- St. Louis Browns (1946)

Chester Lillis Johnson (August 1, 1917 – April 10, 1983) was an American professional baseball pitcher who appeared in five games in Major League Baseball for the St. Louis Browns in 1946. Nicknamed "Chesty Chet," he was listed at 6 feet (1.8 m) tall and 175 pounds (79 kg), and threw and batted left-handed. He was born in Redmond, Washington; a younger brother, Earl, also a southpaw, pitched for the Boston Red Sox and the Detroit Tigers for eight seasons between 1940 and 1951.

Chet Johnson attended the University of Washington, where he played college baseball for the Huskies from 1937–1939. Johnson entered pro baseball in 1939, and his active career would continue for the next 18 seasons, all of them in the minor leagues, apart from his month-long stint with the Browns in September 1946.

During his MLB trial, Johnson made three starts and appeared twice in relief. He did not register a decision or a save, allowing 20 hits, 13 bases on balls and ten earned runs in 18 innings pitched. He struck out eight. He retired from the game in 1956 as a member of the Sacramento Solons, one of six Pacific Coast League teams he played for during his 13 full or partial seasons in that circuit.
