= Les Moss =

American baseball player and manager (1925–2012)

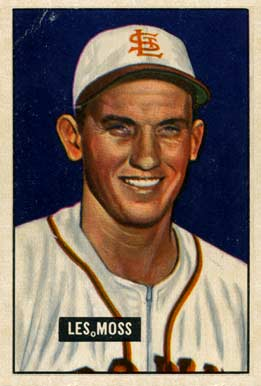
- Catcher / Manager
- Born: May 14, 1925; Tulsa, Oklahoma, U.S.
- Died: August 29, 2012 (aged 87); Longwood, Florida, U.S.
- Batted: Right Threw: Right

MLB debut
- September 10, 1946, for the St. Louis Browns

Last MLB appearance
- September 1, 1958, for the Chicago White Sox

MLB statistics
- Batting average: .247
- Home runs: 63
- Runs batted in: 276
- Managerial record: 39–50
- Winning %: .438
- Stats at Baseball Reference

Teams
- As player: St. Louis Browns (1946–1951); Boston Red Sox (1951); St. Louis Browns / Baltimore Orioles (1952–1955); Chicago White Sox (1955–1958); As manager: Chicago White Sox (1968); Detroit Tigers (1979)

John Lester Moss (May 14, 1925 – August 29, 2012) was an American professional baseball player, coach, scout and manager. He played in Major League Baseball as a catcher for the St. Louis Browns for the most significant portion of his career, and was a backup catcher almost all his career.

== Baseball career ==
Born in Tulsa, Oklahoma, Moss threw and batted right-handed; he was listed as 5 feet 11 inches (1.80 m) tall and 205 pounds (93 kg). He began his professional baseball career in 1942 at the age of 17, playing for the Americus Pioneers of the Georgia–Florida League. In 1943 he moved up to the Class A Elmira Pioneers of the Eastern League where he posted a .308 batting average in 96 games. He missed the 1944 and 1945 seasons while serving in the Merchant Marines during the Second World War. He would play for the Toledo Mud Hens in 1946, hitting .297 in 121 games before, being called up late in the season to make his major league debut at the age of 21 with the St. Louis Browns on September 10.

Moss platooned alongside left-handed-hitting catcher Jake Early, producing a .157 batting average in 96 games during the 1947 season. He held the franchise record as the youngest catcher to hit a home run until he was surpassed by Samuel Basallo on August 30, 2025. He caught the majority of the games for the Browns in 1948 while his hitting improved substantially, with a .257 average along with 14 home runs and 46 runs batted in. In 1949, the Browns acquired 24-year-old Sherm Lollar from the New York Yankees and Moss became the second-string catcher. Moss' hitting continued to improve with a .291 average and an impressive .399 on-base percentage.

On May 17, 1951, Moss was traded to the Boston Red Sox. After producing a .198 batting average in 71 games for the Red Sox, he was shipped back to the Browns on November 28, 1951. He continued as the Browns' second string catcher backing up Clint Courtney. Moss was the Browns' catcher on May 6, 1953 when Bobo Holloman pitched a no-hitter against the Philadelphia Athletics. In 1954, the Browns relocated to Baltimore and were renamed the Orioles. Moss played one full season in Baltimore before being traded to the Chicago White Sox on June 6, 1955, where he once again served as a backup to Sherm Lollar. He played three more seasons with the White Sox before ending his major league career after the 1958 season. He would remain a member of the White Sox organization for the next dozen years.

Moss returned to the minor leagues, appearing in two games for the Indianapolis Indians in 1959 and then, appeared in three games for the San Diego Padres in 1960, before retiring as a player at the age of 35.

== Career statistics ==
In a 13-year major league career, Moss played in 824 games, accumulating 552 hits in 2,234 at bats for a .247 career batting average along with 63 home runs, 276 runs batted in and a .333 on-base percentage. He ended his career with a .978 fielding percentage.

== Coaching and managing career ==
After his playing career, Moss served as the White Sox' batting practice catcher, then moved into their player development organization as a manager in their farm system and an occasional scout through 1966. In 1963, he managed the Lynchburg White Sox to a second-place finish, and was named the Sally League manager of the year. In 1964 he returned to Indianapolis and managed the Triple-A Indians to a second-place finish. He was a coach on the White Sox' MLB staff from 1967 to 1970. Moss served as interim manager in 1968 for 36 games when White Sox manager Al López had to undergo an emergency appendectomy. He was the White Sox pitching coach in 1970.

From 1971 through 1973, Moss managed high-level teams in the California Angels' system, at Shreveport of the Texas League and Salt Lake City of the Pacific Coast League. Then, after a year as an Angels' scout, in 1975, Moss was hired by the Detroit Tigers to manage in their minor league organisation. He managed the Montgomery Rebels to two Southern League championships in 1975 and 1976. In 1977 and 1978, Moss managed the Tigers' Triple-A affiliate, the Evansville Triplets. There he was credited with developing Lance Parrish's catching skills, after the Tigers converted him from a third baseman. After the 1978 season, Moss was voted Manager of the Year in the American Association, and The Sporting News named him Minor League Manager of the Year.

Moss succeeded Ralph Houk as manager for the 1979 Detroit Tigers. In his time with the Tigers, he went 27–26. He was not fired for cause or because he was ineffective, but rather because Sparky Anderson, a proven big-league manager and four-time pennant winner with the Cincinnati Reds, had unexpectedly become available. Moss was named the Tigers' manager soon after the 1978 season concluded. However, after Anderson was fired by the Reds on November 27, 1978, the Tigers came to a deal to bring Anderson to Detroit after the first third of the 1979 season. Following Moss's dismissal on June 12, 1979, coach Dick Tracewski served as interim manager for two games until Anderson's arrival on June 14.

Moss finished with a managing record of 39–50 (.438) in 89 games. Moss became a minor-league pitching instructor in the Chicago Cubs' system in 1980, then served as pitching coach of the MLB Cubs in 1981 and Houston Astros from 1983 to 1989, helping the Astros win the 1986 National League Western Division title. Mike Scott won the 1986 National League Cy Young Award while Moss served as the Astros' pitching coach. In 1990, he worked as minor-league pitching instructor for the Astros, before working as a pitching coordinator for the San Francisco Giants starting in 1991. He retired from baseball in 1995.

Moss died in Longwood, Florida on August 29, 2012 at the age of 87.

== Managerial record ==
Team	Year	Regular season					Postseason			
Team	Year	Games	Won	Lost	Win %	Finish	Won	Lost	Win %	Result
CWS	1968	2	0	2	.000	interim	–	–	–	–
CWS	1968	34	12	22	.353	interim	–	–	–	–
CWS total		36	12	24	.333		0	0	–	
DET	1979	53	27	26	.509	fired	–	–	–	–
DET total		53	27	26	.509		0	0	–	
Total		89	39	50	.438		0	0	–	
