= Bob Malloy (1940s pitcher) =

American baseball player (1918–2007)

- Pitcher
- Born: May 28, 1918; Canonsburg, Pennsylvania, U.S.
- Died: February 20, 2007 (aged 88); Cincinnati, Ohio, U.S.
- Batted: Right Threw: Right

MLB debut
- May 4, 1943, for the Cincinnati Reds

Last MLB appearance
- May 6, 1949, for the St. Louis Browns

MLB statistics
- Win–loss record: 4–7
- Earned run average: 3.26
- Strikeouts: 35
- Stats at Baseball Reference

Teams
- Cincinnati Reds (1943–1944, 1946–1947); St. Louis Browns (1949)

Robert Paul Malloy (May 28, 1918 – February 20, 2007) was an American professional baseball player and a relief pitcher in Major League Baseball who played between 1943 and 1949 for the Cincinnati Reds (1943–44, 1946–47) and St. Louis Browns (1949). Malloy batted and threw right-handed.

== Biography ==
Born in Canonsburg, Pennsylvania on May 28, 1918, Malloy served in the US Army during World War II.

During his five-season, baseball career, Malloy posted a 4–7 record with a 3.26 ERA and two saves in 48 games pitched, including 35 strikeouts, 26 games finished, and 116 innings.

While pitching for Triple-A Indianapolis Indians in 1948, Malloy went 21–7 and led the International League both in wins and ERA. His team ended with a 100–54 mark.

As of 2006, Malloy holds the lowest ERA (3.26) of any major league pitcher coming out of University of Pittsburgh with more than 100 innings. The next are Doc Medich (3.77), Steve Swetonic (3.81), and Johnny Miljus (3.92).

== Death ==
Malloy died in Cincinnati on February 20, 2007. He was eighty-eight.
