= Roy Sievers =

American baseball player (1926–2017)

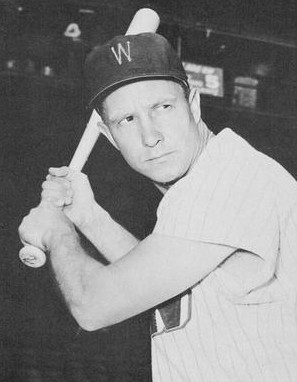
- Sievers with the Washington Senators in 1959
- First baseman / Left fielder
- Born: November 18, 1926; St. Louis, Missouri, U.S.
- Died: April 3, 2017 (aged 90); Spanish Lake, Missouri, U.S.
- Batted: Right Threw: Right

MLB debut
- April 21, 1949, for the St. Louis Browns

Last MLB appearance
- May 9, 1965, for the Washington Senators

MLB statistics
- Batting average: .267
- Home runs: 318
- Runs batted in: 1,147
- Stats at Baseball Reference

Teams
- St. Louis Browns (1949–1953); Washington Senators (1954–1959); Chicago White Sox (1960–1961); Philadelphia Phillies (1962–1964); Washington Senators (1964–1965)

Career highlights and awards
- 5× All-Star (1956, 1957, 1959, 1959², 1961²); AL Rookie of the Year (1949); AL home run leader (1957); AL RBI leader (1957)

Roy Edward Sievers (November 18, 1926 – April 3, 2017) was an American professional baseball player. He played in Major League Baseball (MLB) as a first baseman and left fielder from 1949 through 1965. A five-time All-Star, Sievers was the first American League (AL) Rookie of the Year Award in 1949, and the 1957 AL home run leader and RBI champion. He played for the St. Louis Browns, Washington Senators, Chicago White Sox, Philadelphia Phillies, and the expansion Washington Senators. Sievers batted and threw right-handed.

== Early life ==
Sievers was born in St. Louis, Missouri, on November 18, 1926, and was raised by his parents in St. Louis with his two brothers. He attended Beaumont High School, and played on the baseball team where coach Ray Elliott taught him how to hit with power. Three of his high school teammates became major league players, and contemporaneous Beaumont junior varsity player Earl Weaver became a Hall of Fame manager. Sievers was nicknamed "Squirrel" as a schoolboy basketball star.

Sievers grew up three blocks from Sportsman's Park where both the St. Louis Cardinals and Browns played major league baseball. His father worked for an iron supply company, and once had a tryout as a professional baseball player.

== Professional baseball ==
Sievers was signed out of high school in 1944 by the St. Louis Browns, but then served two years in the U.S. Army before starting his minor league career in the Browns' farm system.

=== Minor leagues ===
In 1947, Sievers was assigned to the Class C Hannibal Pilots of the Central Association. He had a .317 batting average, with 34 home runs, 141 runs batted in (RBI), 121 runs scored, 159 base hits, a .583 slugging percentage and .990 OPS (on-base plus slugging). Sievers led the Central Association in base hits, home runs, runs, RBIs and total bases. He played the majority of the 1948 season with the Class B Springfield Browns, batting .309, with 19 home runs and 75 RBIs in only 343 at bats. He also met his future wife Joan (Colburn) Sievers, whom he married the next year.

=== Major leagues ===
==== St. Louis Browns ====
In 1949, Sievers won the inaugural American League (AL) Rookie of the Year and The Sporting News (TSN) Rookie of the Year awards. He had a .306 batting average (which would be the highest of his career), with 16 home runs, 91 RBIs, 84 runs and an .869 OPS, for the seventh place St. Louis Browns. His average fell to .238 in 1950, with only ten home runs. In 1951, he played in only 31 games for the Browns, and was sent to the Double-A San Antonio Missions to work on his hitting. After only 39 games, he suffered a right shoulder injury with the Missions, while trying to make a diving catch in the outfield. The injury, with a dislocation and torn muscles, was so severe he blacked out.

The following winter he was diagnosed as having a chronic dislocation of his right shoulder, and it was expected he would miss at least half of the 1952 season. He had not responded to treatment and was sent to Johns Hopkins Hospital in Baltimore for more specialized diagnosis and treatment. There was a fear he would never play again if he could not use his throwing arm, and the Browns moved him from the outfield to first base. He played in only 11 games for the Browns in 1952, but in 1953 Sievers played in 92 games and hit .270, with eight home runs in 285 at bats.

The Browns were moving to Baltimore in 1954, and had become the Baltimore Orioles. In February 1954, the Orioles traded Sievers to the Washington Senators for Gil Coan before the 1954 season; without his ever having played as an Oriole.

==== Original Washington Senators ====
Sievers became the standout star player on a chronically poor Senators team. In Washington, Sievers collected 95 or more RBIs and played at least 144 games during five consecutive years (1954–58). Sievers's most productive season as a major league player came in 1957, when he led the league in home runs (42), RBI (114), extra base hits (70) and total bases (331), while batting .301. Sievers hit home runs in six consecutive games that year, a record until 1956. He finished third in the Most Valuable Player (MVP) ballot (behind Mickey Mantle and Ted Williams) with four first-place votes and 205 points. In 1958, he had a team-leading 39 homes runs, 108 RBIs and .295 batting average. Over his full six years in Washington, he hit 180 home runs with 574 RBIs and an .859 OPS. Sievers made the AL All-Star Team as a Senator three times (1956–57, 1959).

Despite his shoulder issues, he played the majority of games for the Senators in left field, not at first base. In March of 1954, Sievers was still in the process of recovering his arm strength and he could not make throws from the outfield. Senators' manager Bucky Harris, however, showed confidence in Sievers being able to improve his throwing and play in the outfield again. In 1954, he led all AL players in games played in left field (133) and putouts (296) by a left fielder. He was second in the league among left fielders with 10 assists, and was third in fielding percentage (.971).

In 1955, he was first among left fielders in fielding percentage (.988), second in games played (129) and putouts (245), and fifth in assists (6). In 1956, he split time almost evenly between left field and first base, but in 1957, he was third among left fielders in games played, putouts and assists, and fourth in fielding percentage. In 1958, he again led all AL leftfielders in fielding percentage (.991), but only played 114 games in left field that year, still ranking fourth and fifth in putouts and assists.

In 1959, Sievers was injured three times and played the vast majority of his 115 games at first base. Even with the reduced play and injuries, he hit 21 home runs, but only batted .242 with 49 RBIs. He was still selected to both 1959 All-Star games.

==== Chicago White Sox, Philadelphia Phillies and expansion Washington Senators ====
On April 4, 1960, Sievers went to the Chicago White Sox in a trade that sent Earl Battey and Don Mincher to Washington, plus cash. A year earlier, the White Sox had offered $250,000 for Sievers and two other players, and also reportedly offered $300,000 and five players (including Battey) but the Senators declined. The White Sox still went to the 1959 World Series. The 1960 offer was reduced in light of Sievers 1959 injury history.

Sievers did rebound from his 1959 season. In his first year with the Sox, he hit .295 with 28 home runs, 93 RBIs and a .930 OPS, and had almost an identical season in 1961, hitting .295 with 27 home runs, 92 RBIs and a .913 OPS making his fourth All-Star appearance in the second 1960 All-Star Game. He led the White Sox in home runs both years, playing almost entirely at first base. In 1960, the White Sox finished in third place in the AL (87–67), and fourth place in 1961 (86–76).

After the 1961 season, the White Sox traded him to the National League (NL) Phillies for Charley Smith and John Buzhardt. He remained a first baseman for the Phillies. In 1962, he played in 144 games, batting .262 with 21 home runs and 80 RBIs; and in 1963, he played in 138 games, batting .240, with 19 home runs and 82 RBIs.

In 1964, he had played in only 49 games, with a .183 batting average and only four home runs when the Phillies sold his contract rights to the expansion Washington Senators on July 16, 1964. Sievers played in only 33 games for the Senators in 1964, and 12 games in 1965, when he was released on May 15. He played his final game on May 9, 1965, coming up as a pinch hitter, and then replaced by a pinch hitter.

=== Legacy ===
Sievers in 1993

Ned Garver, who pitched in the American League during the 1950s, considered Sievers the best first baseman in the league during that time. Sal Maglie, star pitcher for the New York Giants who specialized in throwing the curveball, used Sievers as an example of a curveball hitter in a 1958 article for Sports Illustrated.

At the time of his death in 2017, Sievers was the oldest living member of the expansion Senators team. Sievers was one of only nine players to don the uniform of both the original and expansion Washington Senators teams, the others being Rudy Hernández, Héctor Maestri, Don Mincher, Camilo Pascual, Pedro Ramos, Johnny Schaive, Zoilo Versalles, and Hal Woodeshick.

At a time when achieving 300 home runs was still a rarity, he became only the 22nd ballplayer to reach the plateau; he is also the earliest to hit 300 career home runs and not eventually be elected to the Baseball Hall of Fame.

In a 17-season career, Sievers was a .267 hitter with 318 home runs, 1,703 hits, and 1,147 RBIs, in 1,887 games. Defensively, he compiled a career .989 fielding percentage.

=== Coaching and managing ===
After his playing career ended, he served one season (1966) as a coach for the Cincinnati Reds and managed in the minor leagues for the New York Mets and Oakland Athletics. He managed the Williamsport Mets of the Eastern League in 1967 to a 73–66 record. He managed the Mets' Texas League affiliated Memphis Blues to a 67–69 record in 1968. He also managed the Single-A Burlington Bees of the Midwest League (an Oakland Athletics' affiliate) in 1969-70. He stopped managing because he could not afford to raise his family on what he was being paid. Sievers returned to St. Louis and worked for a trucking firm.

== Honors ==
Sievers was inducted into the Missouri Sports Hall of Fame in 1992. He has also been inducted into the St. Louis Sports Hall of Fame.

== Personal life ==
While playing for the Senators, Sievers developed a friendship with then Vice President Richard M. Nixon. He met three other presidents in addition to Nixon (Dwight D. Eisenhower, John F. Kennedy, and Lyndon B. Johnson), and even Soviet leader Nikita Khrushchev. Nixon was the master of ceremonies at a special night honoring Sievers in 1957.

In the 1958 movie Damn Yankees, it is Sievers's swing of the bat that is actually shown when the character played by Tab Hunter is batting.

== Death ==
Sievers died in his home in Spanish Lake, Missouri, on April 3, 2017, age 90.

== See also ==
- Sporting News Rookie of the Year Award
- List of Major League Baseball career home run leaders
- List of Major League Baseball career runs batted in leaders
- List of Major League Baseball annual runs batted in leaders
- List of Major League Baseball annual home run leaders

Sporting positions
Preceded by Reggie Otero	Cincinnati Reds first base coach 1966	Succeeded by Jim Bragan
