= Hank Arft =

American baseball player (1922–2002)

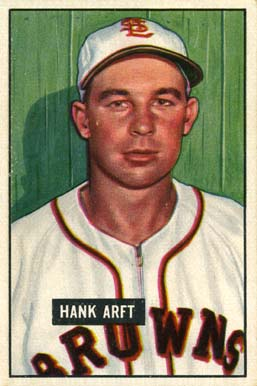
- First baseman
- Born: January 28, 1922; Manchester, Missouri, U.S.
- Died: December 14, 2002 (aged 80); St. Louis, Missouri, U.S.
- Batted: Left Threw: Left

MLB debut
- July 27, 1948, for the St. Louis Browns

Last MLB appearance
- May 23, 1952, for the St. Louis Browns

MLB statistics
- Batting average: .253
- Home runs: 13
- Runs batted in: 118
- Stats at Baseball Reference

Teams
- St. Louis Browns (1948–1952)

Henry Irven Arft Jr. (January 28, 1922 – December 14, 2002), nicknamed "Bow Wow", was an American Major League Baseball player.

== Career ==
After playing minor league baseball from 1940 to 1942, Arft served in the United States Navy from November 16, 1944, through June 7, 1946. According to this honorable discharge, he served at, on, or with the following:

1. Naval Reserve Station - St. Louis, MO

2. Naval Training Center - Great Lakes, IL

3. Naval Training & Distribution Center - Shoemaker, CA

4. USS Goss

5. Service Squadron 10

He was a Seaman Second Class at the time of his discharge, and he went on to play first base for the St. Louis Browns from 1948 to 1952. His top season was 1951, during which he achieved career highs in wins above replacement, games played, plate appearances, hits, home runs, RBIs, stolen bases, total bases, and OPS+. He died of cancer at the age of 80 years.
