= Ken Wood (baseball) =

American baseball player (1924–2007)

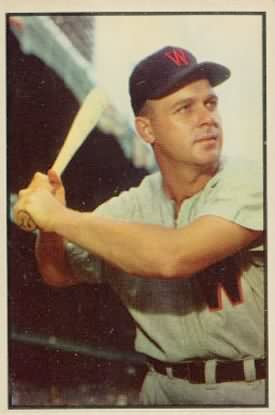
- Outfielder
- Born: July 1, 1924; Lincolnton, North Carolina, U.S.
- Died: November 22, 2007 (aged 83); North Myrtle Beach, South Carolina, U.S.
- Batted: Right Threw: Right

MLB debut
- April 28, 1948, for the St. Louis Browns

Last MLB appearance
- May 23, 1953, for the Washington Senators

MLB statistics
- Batting average: .224
- Home runs: 34
- Runs batted in: 143
- Stats at Baseball Reference

Teams
- St. Louis Browns (1948–1951); Boston Red Sox (1952); Washington Senators (1952–1953)

Kenneth Lanier Wood (July 1, 1924 – November 22, 2007) was an American professional baseball player. He played all or part of six seasons in Major League Baseball for the St. Louis Browns (1948–51), Boston Red Sox (1952) and Washington Senators (1952–53), mostly as a right or left fielder. He batted and threw right-handed.

Wood was born in Lincolnton, North Carolina. An outfielder with a strong arm, in 1949 he threw 2 runners out at home plate in the same inning. The first runner attempted to score from second base on a right field single. Woods threw to Sherm Lollar the catcher who tagged the runner out. The next hitter hit a fly ball to right field where Woods caught it with a runner on third base. Woods also threw a perfect strike to Sherman Lollar who again tagged the runner out. He began his professional career in 1941. He made his major league debut with the St. Louis Browns in 1948. In 1950 he hit 13 home runs and posted career numbers with 42 runs scored, 24 doubles, 62 runs batted in and 128 games played, and in 1951 hit a career-high 15 home runs with 40 runs and 44 RBI in 109 games. He also appeared in part of two seasons with the Boston Red Sox and Washington Senators and played his final major league game in 1953. He continued to play in the minor leagues until 1956.

In a six-season career, Wood was a .224 hitter with 34 home runs and 143 RBI in 342 games. He never batted higher than .237 in a season.
