= Joe Grace (baseball) =

American baseball player (1914-1969)

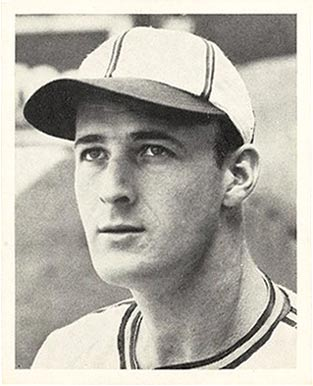
- Outfielder
- Born: January 5, 1914; Gorham, Illinois, U.S.
- Died: September 18, 1969 (aged 55); Murphysboro, Illinois, U.S.
- Batted: Left Threw: Right

MLB debut
- September 24, 1938, for the St. Louis Browns

Last MLB appearance
- September 3, 1947, for the Washington Senators

MLB statistics
- Batting average: .283
- Home runs: 20
- Runs batted in: 172
- Stats at Baseball Reference

Teams
- St. Louis Browns (1938–1941, 1946); Washington Senators (1946–1947)

Joseph LaVerne Grace (January 5, 1914 – September 18, 1969) was an American professional baseball outfielder who played in Major League Baseball (MLB) for the St. Louis Browns and Washington Senators over six seasons between 1938 and 1947. Grace batted left-handed, threw right-handed, and was listed as 6 feet 1 inch (1.85 m) tall and 180 pounds (82 kg).

Born in Gorham, Illinois, Grace entered pro ball in 1935. He joined the Browns in September 1938 after three seasons with the Class A1 Memphis Chicks. After three partial seasons with St. Louis, he spent the entire 1941 campaign with the Browns and batted .309 with 112 hits. Called to World War II military service after that season, he served in the United States Navy from 1942 to 1945. Upon returning to baseball, he spent two more full seasons in the majors, appearing in 125 games in 1946 in a season split between the Browns and Senators, then in 78 contests for Washington in 1947. His minor league career continued in the top-level Pacific Coast League in 1953. He briefly managed in the Chicago Cubs' farm system with the 1966 Duluth-Superior Dukes.

In the majors, Grace posted a .283 batting average (442 for 1,561) with 76 doubles, 18 triples, 20 home runs and 172 RBI in 484 games played.

Grace died in an automobile accident on September 18, 1969, at the age of 55 in Murphysboro, Illinois.
