= Gorham, Illinois =

- Village
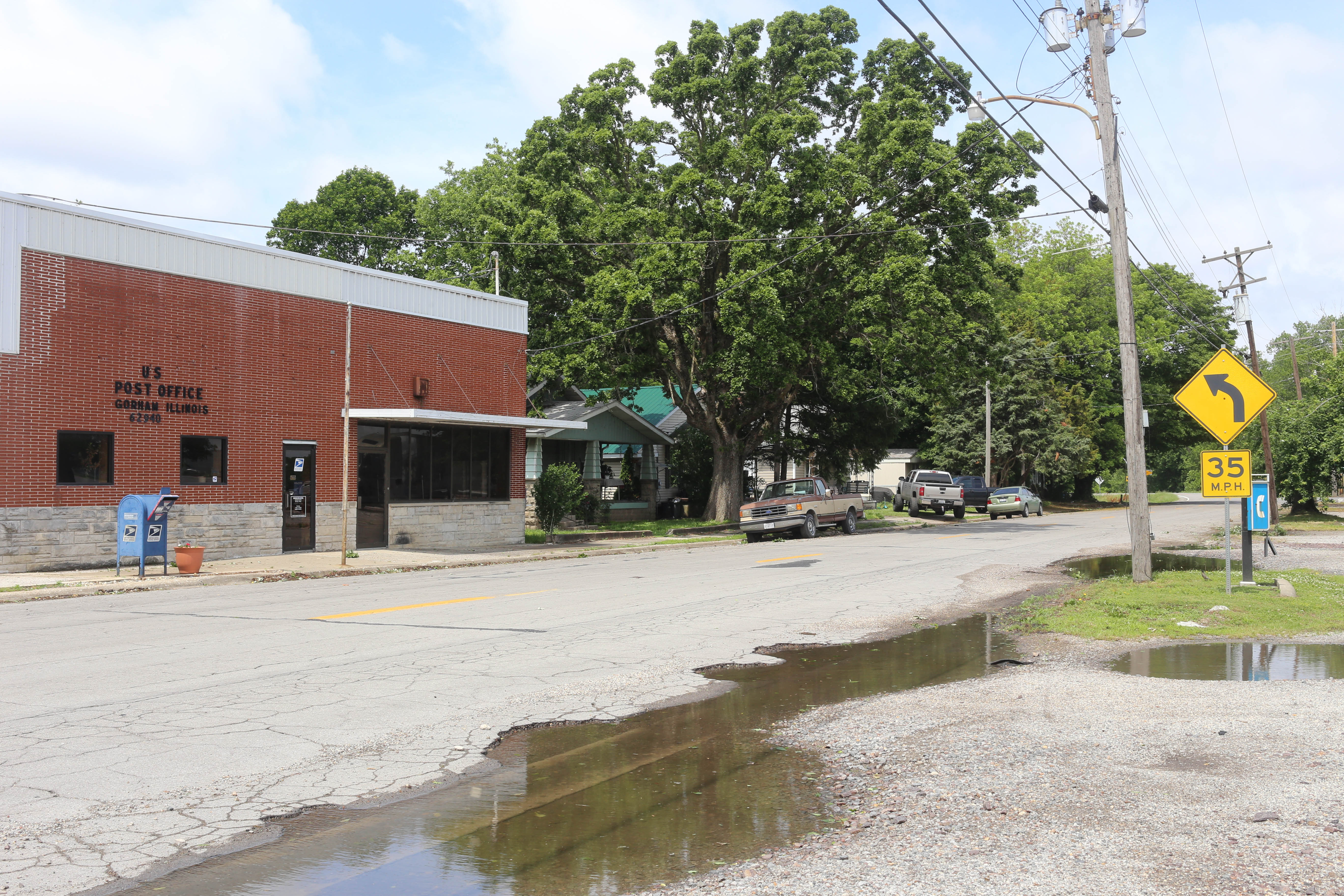
- U.S. Post Office in Gorham

- Location of Gorham in Jackson County, Illinois.
- Coordinates: 37°42′54″N 89°28′59″W
- Country: United States
- State: Illinois
- County: Jackson
- Township: Sand Ridge

Area
  - Total: 1.23 sq mi (3.19 km^{2})
  - Land: 1.22 sq mi (3.16 km^{2})
  - Water: 0.012 sq mi (0.03 km^{2})
- Elevation: 361 ft (110 m)

Population (2020)
  - Total: 173
  - Density: 141.9/sq mi (54.78/km^{2})
- Time zone: UTC-6 (CST)
  - Summer (DST): UTC-5 (CDT)
- ZIP code: 62940
- Area code: 618
- FIPS code: 17-30588
- GNIS feature ID: 2398182

Gorham is a village in Jackson County, Illinois, United States. The population was 173 at the 2020 census. It is known locally for its near-annihilation during the deadly 1925 Tri-State tornado.

== Geography ==
According to the 2021 census gazetteer files, Gorham has a total area of 1.23 square miles (3.19 km^{2}), of which 1.22 square miles (3.16 km^{2}) (or 99.11%) is land and 0.01 square miles (0.03 km^{2}) (or 0.89%) is water.

Gorham is located in the middle of the Mississippi River floodplain, which is among the most fertile farming regions in the Midwestern United States. The village is at a particularly low elevated region of the floodplain known as the "Bottoms". This makes it more susceptible to flooding, as it was threatened in the infamous Great Flood of 1993 and the New Year's Day Flood of 2016.

In 1925, the powerful Tri-State Tornado struck the town at 2:26pm. Out of the 80 houses in the town, 60 were destroyed and the other 20 were damaged. The train depot and all the store fronts were also destroyed, as well as the top two floors of the school leaving only the first. 34 people were killed in the tornado.

Less than one mile south of Gorham is a large hill named Fountain Bluff. Though the bluff is not exceptionally well-known, its rock faces do attract occasional rock-climbers. Etched into cliffs on the north side of this landform are several Native American petroglyphs.

== Demographics ==
Historical population
Census	Pop.	Note	%±
1910	392		—
1920	463		18.1%
1930	517		11.7%
1940	595		15.1%
1950	447		−24.9%
1960	378		−15.4%
1970	361		−4.5%
1980	381		5.5%
1990	290		−23.9%
2000	256		−11.7%
2010	236		−7.8%
2020	173		−26.7%
U.S. Decennial Census

As of the 2020 census there were 173 people, 78 households, and 57 families residing in the village. The population density was 140.65 inhabitants per square mile (54.31/km^{2}). There were 86 housing units at an average density of 69.92 per square mile (27.00/km^{2}). The racial makeup of the village was 93.06% White, 0.58% African American, 0.58% Native American, 0.00% Asian, 0.00% Pacific Islander, 3.47% from other races, and 2.31% from two or more races. Hispanic or Latino of any race were 7.51% of the population.

There were 78 households, out of which 35.9% had children under the age of 18 living with them, 43.59% were married couples living together, 23.08% had a female householder with no husband present, and 26.92% were non-families. 23.08% of all households were made up of individuals, and 14.10% had someone living alone who was 65 years of age or older. The average household size was 3.98 and the average family size was 3.37.

The village's age distribution consisted of 34.2% under the age of 18, 16.7% from 18 to 24, 21.3% from 25 to 44, 19% from 45 to 64, and 8.7% who were 65 years of age or older. The median age was 24.7 years. For every 100 females, there were 105.5 males. For every 100 females age 18 and over, there were 127.6 males.

The median income for a household in the village was $27,188, and the median income for a family was $38,125. Males had a median income of $21,563 versus $21,667 for females. The per capita income for the village was $12,378. About 29.8% of families and 51.0% of the population were below the poverty line, including 68.9% of those under age 18 and 0.0% of those age 65 or over.

== Education ==
It is in the Murphysboro Community Unit School District 186.

== Notable person ==
- Joe Grace (1914–1969), professional baseball outfielder for the St. Louis Browns and Washington Senators
