= Jim Bilbrey =

American baseball player (1924-1985)

- Pitcher
- Born: April 20, 1924; Rickman, Tennessee, U.S.
- Died: December 26, 1985 (aged 61); Toledo, Ohio, U.S.
- Batted: Right Threw: Right

MLB debut
- May 17, 1949, for the St. Louis Browns

Last MLB appearance
- May 17, 1949, for the St. Louis Browns

MLB statistics
- Win–loss record: 0–0
- Earned run average: 18.00
- Strikeouts: 0
- Stats at Baseball Reference

Teams
- St. Louis Browns (1949)

James Melvin Bilbrey (April 20, 1924 – December 26, 1985) was an American professional baseball player and a Major League Baseball pitcher who played one game for the St. Louis Browns.
