= George Bradley (outfielder) =

American baseball player (1914-1982)

- Outfielder
- Born: April 1, 1914; Greenwood, Arkansas, U.S.
- Died: October 19, 1982 (aged 68); Lawrenceburg, Tennessee, U.S.
- Batted: Right Threw: Right

MLB debut
- April 28, 1946, for the St. Louis Browns

Last MLB appearance
- May 13, 1946, for the St. Louis Browns

MLB statistics
- Batting average: .167
- Home runs: 0
- Runs batted in: 3
- Stats at Baseball Reference

Teams
- St. Louis Browns (1946)

George Washington Bradley (April 1, 1914 – October 19, 1982) was an American professional baseball player who appeared in four games in Major League Baseball as a center fielder and pinch hitter for the St. Louis Browns in 1946. Bradley was a native of Greenwood, Arkansas, who threw and batted right-handed, stood 6 feet 1 inch (1.85 m) tall and weighed 185 pounds (84 kg).

Overall, Bradley had an 11-year career (1936–1942) and 1944–1947) in professional baseball, and spent all but one of those seasons as a member of the Browns' organization. His MLB trial came at the age of 32 during the first post-World War II campaign. He collected his only two hits in his debut game on Sunday, April 28, 1946, against the Chicago White Sox at Comiskey Park in the nightcap of a doubleheader. In his first big league at bat, he singled off Eddie Smith as part of a nine-run first inning to drive in two runs. When St. Louis batted around, Bradley came to the plate again in that frame and he made the last out. Later in the game, in the fourth, Bradley doubled off Len Perme to extend the Brownie lead to 11–3. St. Louis would hold on to win 11–8 in a contest that featured 29 hits and a combined five errors committed by both teams.

Bradley started two other games in centerfield for the Browns, and had one pinch-hitting opportunity, but went hitless. In his four games, he batted .167 (two for 12), with three total runs batted in.
