= Al Zarilla =

American baseball player (1919–1996)

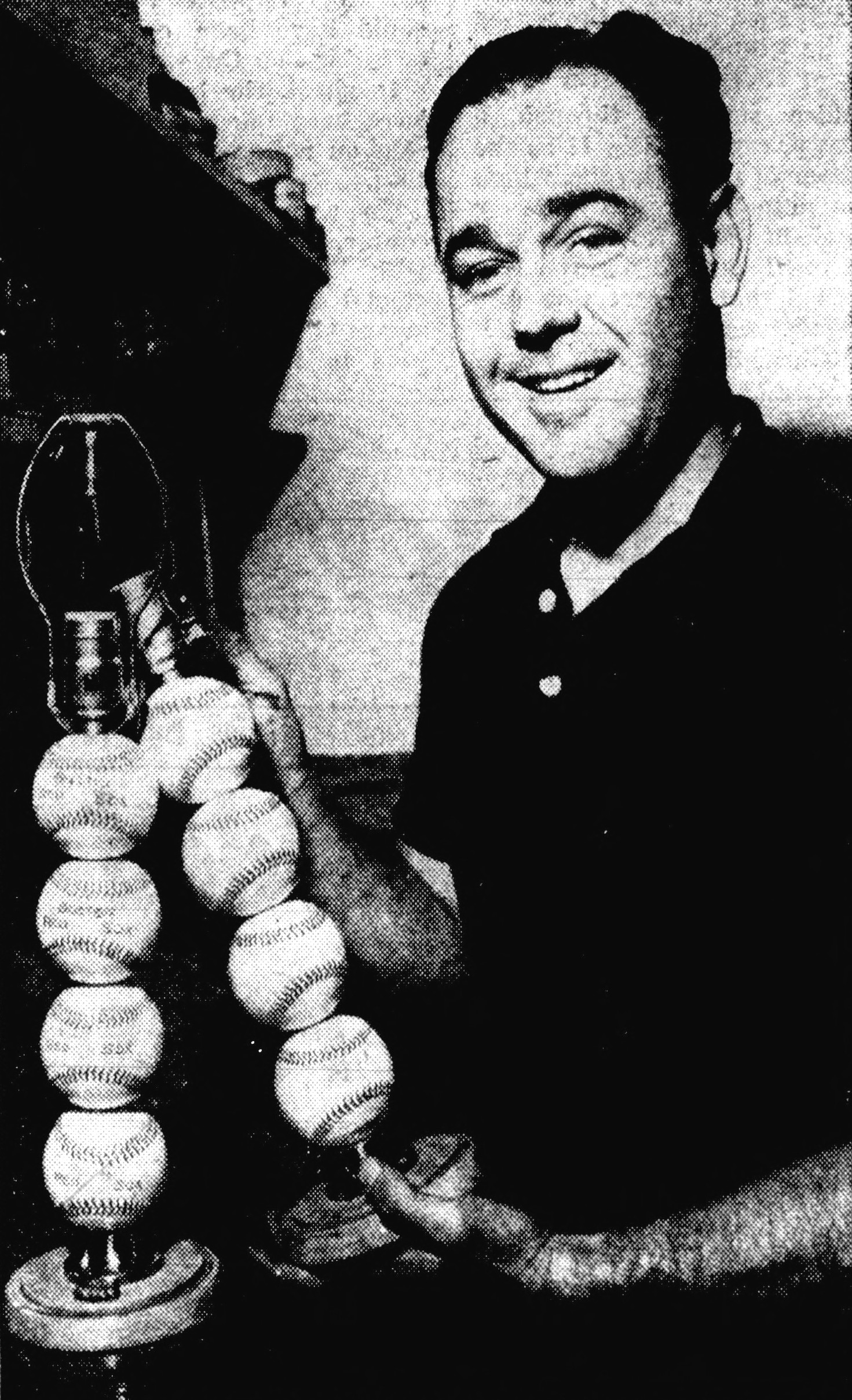
- Zarilla, circa 1950
- Outfielder
- Born: May 1, 1919; Los Angeles, California, U.S.
- Died: August 28, 1996 (aged 77); Honolulu, Hawaii, U.S.
- Batted: Left Threw: Right

MLB debut
- June 30, 1943, for the St. Louis Browns

Last MLB appearance
- September 26, 1953, for the Boston Red Sox

MLB statistics
- Batting average: .276
- Home runs: 61
- Runs batted in: 456
- Stats at Baseball Reference

Teams
- St. Louis Browns (1943–1944, 1946–1949); Boston Red Sox (1949–1950); Chicago White Sox (1951–1952); St. Louis Browns (1952); Boston Red Sox (1952–1953)

Career highlights and awards
- All-Star (1948)

Allen Lee "Zeke" Zarilla (May 1, 1919 – August 28, 1996) was an American professional baseball player, scout and coach. He played as an outfielder in Major League Baseball from 1943 to 1953, most notably as a member of the only St. Louis Browns team to win an American League pennant in 1944. He also played for the Boston Red Sox and the Chicago White Sox, primarily as a right fielder. Zarilla batted left-handed and threw right-handed, and was listed as 5 feet 11 inches (1.80 m) tall and 180 pounds (82 kg).

== Baseball career ==
Zarilla was born in Los Angeles, California. A solid outfielder with a strong arm and basically a line-drive hitter, Zarilla started his major league career in 1943 with the St. Louis Browns. In 1944 he hit .299 in 100 games, scoring and driving in a run in Game Three of the World Series. After that, he served in the military, returning to the major leagues in 1946.

Zarilla had his most productive season in 1948, when he posted career-highs in average (.329, fourth in the American League), hits (174), home runs (12), doubles (39), stolen bases (11) and games (144), while scoring 77 runs with 74 RBI and made his only appearance in the All-Star Game.

By 1949, Zarilla was the lone member of the pennant-winning 1944 Browns still on the roster. That year, the team sent Zarilla to the Boston Red Sox. He hit .281 in 124 games for his new team, and enjoyed another fine season in 1950 with a .325 average (fifth in AL), joining Dom DiMaggio (.328) and Ted Williams (.317) in the Boston all-.300 outfield. He also collected career-highs in slugging percentage (.493), runs (92) and walks (76), and tied a major league record with four doubles in a game (June 8).

On December 10, 1950, Zarilla was traded by the Boston Red Sox with Joe Dobson and Dick Littlefield to the Chicago White Sox for Bill Wight and Ray Scarborough. Zarilla and Gus Zernial teamed up in April 1951 to become the only players whose last names started with "Z" to play together in the same outfield. Zarilla and Zernial played right and left field, respectively, as part of a White Sox outfield unit in four games. At the end of April, Zernial was traded to the Philadelphia A's.

In 1952, Zarilla divided his playing time between the White Sox, Browns and Red Sox. He played his final major league game at the age of 34 with Boston in the 1953 season.

Zarilla is also remembered for a call by Dizzy Dean, the former Cardinals pitching ace turned Browns broadcaster, who saw him slide into third base, and yelled, "Zarilla slud into third!"

In a ten-season MLB career, Zarilla posted a .276 batting average with 61 home runs and 456 RBI in 1120 games played. He posted a career .974 fielding percentage at all three outfield positions.

Zarilla scouted for multiple MLB teams after his playing career, and spent one season, 1971, on the coaching staff of his old teammate Ted Williams, then the manager of the Washington Senators. He died in Honolulu, Hawaii, at the age of 77.
