= Paul Lehner =

American baseball player (1920–1967)

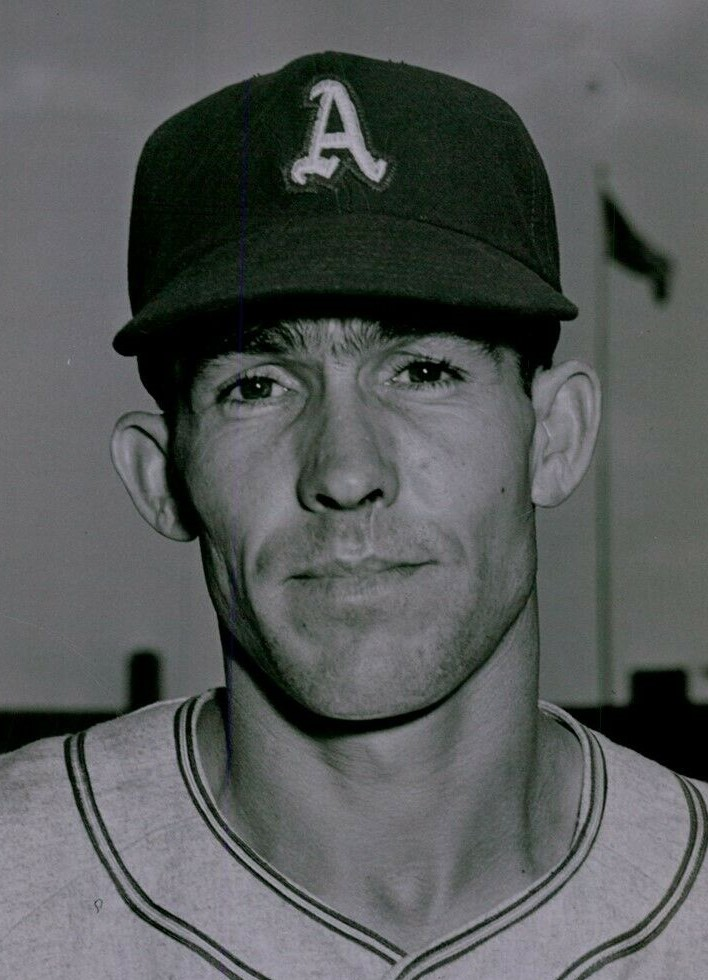
- Outfielder
- Born: July 1, 1920; Dolomite, Alabama, U.S.
- Died: December 27, 1967 (aged 47); Birmingham, Alabama, U.S.
- Batted: Left Threw: Left

MLB debut
- September 10, 1946, for the St. Louis Browns

Last MLB appearance
- June 30, 1952, for the Boston Red Sox

MLB statistics
- Batting average: .257
- Home runs: 22
- Runs batted in: 197
- Stats at Baseball Reference

Teams
- St. Louis Browns (1946–1949); Philadelphia Athletics (1950–1951); Chicago White Sox (1951); St. Louis Browns (1951); Cleveland Indians (1951); Boston Red Sox (1952)

Paul Eugene Lehner (July 1, 1920 – December 27, 1967) was an American outfielder in Major League Baseball, playing mainly as a center fielder for five American League teams from 1946 through 1952. A native of Dolomite, Alabama, Lehner batted and threw left-handed. Listed at 5 feet 9 inches (1.75 m) tall and 165 pounds (75 kg), he was nicknamed "Peanuts" or "Gulliver." He worked in the region's coal mines as a young man.

== Biography ==
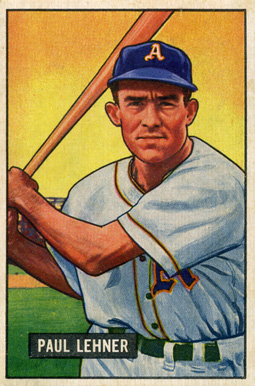
Lehner's 1951 Bowman Gum card

Lehner's professional baseball career began when he was 25, after World War II service in the United States Army Air Forces. He was one of a few big leaguers to play for four different teams in a single season. He reached the majors in 1946 with the St. Louis Browns, spending four years with them before moving to the Philadelphia Athletics in 1950. He started 1951 with Philadelphia, then was part of successive trades between the Athletics, Chicago White Sox, Browns, and Cleveland Indians. His most productive season came in 1950 with Philadelphia, when he posted career-highs in batting average (.309), home runs (9), and RBI (52) in 114 games. He also played briefly for the Boston Red Sox in 1952, his last major league season.

When playing with the Browns, Lehner believed that he could not hit safely if he played on a Sunday. He would approach the Browns' trainer with an alleged ailment that would keep him out of the line-up for a Sunday game. When Lehner finally admitted to the trainer of his problem, the trainer said that he had some new pills that could help him. Lehner took the pills before a Sunday double-header, hit a home run in the first game, and never tried to be excused from Sunday games again.

In a seven-season career, Lehner was a .257 hitter with 22 home runs and 197 RBI in 540 games. Lehner died in Birmingham, Alabama, at the age of 47. He was buried in Bessemer's Highland Memorial Gardens.
