= Ray Shore =

American baseball player (1921-1996)

- Pitcher
- Born: June 9, 1921; Cincinnati, Ohio, U.S.
- Died: August 13, 1996 (aged 75); St. Louis, Missouri, U.S.
- Batted: Right Threw: Right

MLB debut
- September 21, 1946, for the St. Louis Browns

Last MLB appearance
- July 4, 1949, for the St. Louis Browns

MLB statistics
- Win–loss record: 1–3
- Earned run average: 8.23
- Strikeouts: 26
- Stats at Baseball Reference

Teams
- As player: St. Louis Browns (1946, 1948–1949); As coach: Cincinnati Reds (1963–1967)

Raymond Everett Shore (June 9, 1921 – August 13, 1996), nicknamed "Snacks", was an American pitcher, coach and scout in Major League Baseball. A native of Cincinnati, Shore threw and batted right-handed, stood 6 ft 3 in (1.91 m) (191 cm) tall and weighed 230 pounds (104 kg).

Shore broke into professional baseball as a catcher before World War II, but by the time he mustered out of military service (in the United States Army Air Forces) in 1946, he had converted to pitching. While his Major League pitching career was ordinary — he appeared in 31 games over parts of three seasons (1946; 1948–1949) with the St. Louis Browns, winning one of four decisions and compiling an earned run average of 8.23 in 62⅓ innings pitched — Shore would become a stellar relief pitcher with the Toronto Maple Leafs of the Triple-A International League during the 1950s. However, by the end of the 1957 season, Shore's active career was over. He was out of the game for three seasons.

In 1961, Bill DeWitt, who was the owner and general manager of the Browns when Shore pitched there, assumed the same positions with Shore's hometown Cincinnati Reds. DeWitt hired Shore as the Reds' batting practice pitcher in 1961–62, then promoted him to a full-time coaching position, which Shore held from 1963 through 1967.

In 1968, Shore became the Reds' "superscout", serving as both the advance scout analyzing upcoming opponents and as a special assignment scout who evaluated playing talent at the Major League level for potential acquisition in trades. He became one of the most respected scouts of this kind in baseball, advising then-Cincinnati general manager Bob Howsam on a series of trades — including the deal that netted eventual Baseball Hall of Fame second baseman Joe Morgan from the Houston Astros — that helped Cincinnati win four National League pennants and World Series titles in 1975 and 1976. Shore switched allegiances to the Philadelphia Phillies on November 8, 1983, and was still scouting for them when he died, at age 75, during a scouting trip to St. Louis in 1996.
