= 1949 Chicago White Sox season =

1949 Chicago White Sox
- League: American League
- Ballpark: Comiskey Park
- City: Chicago
- Owners: Grace Comiskey
- General managers: Frank Lane
- Managers: Jack Onslow
- Television: WGN-TV (Jack Brickhouse, Harry Creighton)
- Radio: WJJD/WFMF (Bob Elson)

The 1949 Chicago White Sox season was the White Sox's 49th season in the major leagues, and their 50th season overall. They finished with a record of 63–91, good enough for sixth place in the American League, 34 games behind the first place New York Yankees.

== Offseason ==
- November 10, 1948: Tod Davis was drafted from the White Sox by the Philadelphia Athletics in the 1948 rule 5 draft.

== Regular season ==
The 1949 White Sox were the last American League team in the 20th century to hit more triples than home runs. The club had 66 triples compared to 43 home runs.

=== Season standings ===
American League
Team	W	L	Pct.	GB	Home	Road
New York Yankees	97	57	.630	—	54‍–‍23	43‍–‍34
Boston Red Sox	96	58	.623	1	61‍–‍16	35‍–‍42
Cleveland Indians	89	65	.578	8	49‍–‍28	40‍–‍37
Detroit Tigers	87	67	.565	10	50‍–‍27	37‍–‍40
Philadelphia Athletics	81	73	.526	16	52‍–‍25	29‍–‍48
Chicago White Sox	63	91	.409	34	32‍–‍45	31‍–‍46
St. Louis Browns	53	101	.344	44	36‍–‍41	17‍–‍60
Washington Senators	50	104	.325	47	26‍–‍51	24‍–‍53

=== Record vs. opponents ===
1949 American League record Sources:
Team	BOS	CWS	CLE	DET	NYY	PHA	SLB	WSH
Boston	—	17–5	8–14	15–7–1	9–13	14–8	15–7	18–4
Chicago	5–17	—	7–15	8–14	7–15	6–16	15–7	15–7
Cleveland	14–8	15–7	—	13–9	10–12	9–13	15–7	13–9
Detroit	7–15–1	14–8	9–13	—	11–11	14–8	14–8	18–4
New York	13–9	15–7	12–10	11–11	—	14–8	17–5–1	15–7
Philadelphia	8–14	16–6	13–9	8–14	8–14	—	12–10	16–6
St. Louis	7–15	7–15	7–15	8–14	5–17–1	10–12	—	9–13
Washington	4–18	7–15	9–13	4–18	7–15	6–16	13–9	—

=== Opening Day lineup ===
- Floyd Baker, 3B
- Dave Philley, CF
- Luke Appling, SS
- Gus Zernial, LF
- Pat Seerey, RF
- Cass Michaels, 2B
- Steve Souchock, 1B
- Joe Tipton, C
- Al Gettel, P

=== Notable transactions ===
- June 2, 1949: Jerry Scala, a player to be named later, and cash were traded by the White Sox to the Oakland Oaks for Catfish Metkovich. The Oaks returned Jerry Scala to the White Sox on June 11, and the Chicago White Sox sent Earl Rapp to the Oaks to complete the trade.
- September 13, 1949: Jack Bruner was signed as an amateur free agent by the White Sox.

=== Roster ===
1949 Chicago White Sox
Roster
Pitchers: 39 Fred Bradley; 49 Jack Bruner; 56 Bob Cain; 34 Alex Carrasquel; 56 Bill Evans; 28 Al Gettel; 36 Ernest Groth; 45 Orval Grove; 18 Randy Gumpert; 12 Mickey Haefner; 48 Howie Judson; 35,39,49 Ed Klieman; 46 Bob Kuzava; 19 Billy Pierce; 14 Marino Pieretti; 37,40 Clyde Shoun; 16 Max Surkont; 29 Bill Wight	Catchers: 28 Eddie Malone; 15 Joe Tipton; 38 Don Wheeler; 58 George Yankowski; Infielders: 4 Luke Appling; 8 Floyd Baker; 58 Jim Baumer; 25 Gordon Goldsberry; 26,59 Fred Hancock; 47 Don Kolloway; 25 Chuck Kress; 24 Rocky Krsnich; 7 Cass Michaels; 2 Bobby Rhawn	Outfielders: 24 Herb Adams; 12 Billy Bowers; 58 Bill Higdon; 12 Dick Lane; 47 Catfish Metkovich; 2 Johnny Ostrowski; 9 Dave Philley; 26 Earl Rapp; 2 Jerry Scala; 5 Pat Seerey; 63 Steve Souchock; 6 Gus Zernial	Manager: 23 Jack Onslow; Coaches: 44 Ray Berres; 33 Bing Miller; 22 Buster Mills

== Player stats ==
=== Batting ===
Note: G = Games played; AB = At bats; R = Runs scored; H = Hits; 2B = Doubles; 3B = Triples; HR = Home runs; RBI = Runs batted in; BB = Base on balls; SO = Strikeouts; AVG = Batting average; SB = Stolen bases

Player	G	AB	R	H	2B	3B	HR	RBI	BB	SO	AVG	SB
Herb Adams, CF, LF	56	208	26	61	5	3	0	16	9	16	.293	1
Luke Appling, SS	142	492	82	148	21	5	5	58	121	24	.301	7
Floyd Baker, 3B	125	388	38	101	15	4	1	40	84	32	.260	3
Jim Baumer, SS	8	10	2	4	1	1	0	2	2	1	.400	0
Billy Bowers, OF	26	78	5	15	2	1	0	6	4	5	.192	1
Gordon Goldsberry, 1B	39	145	25	36	3	2	1	13	18	9	.248	2
Fred Hancock, SS, 3B	39	52	7	7	2	1	0	9	8	9	.135	0
Bill Higdon, CF	11	23	3	7	3	0	0	1	6	3	.304	1
Don Kolloway, 3B	4	4	0	0	0	0	0	0	0	1	.000	0
Chuck Kress, 1B	97	353	45	98	17	6	1	44	39	44	.278	6
Rocky Krsnich, 3B	16	55	7	12	3	1	1	9	6	4	.218	0
Dick Lane, LF	12	42	4	5	0	0	0	4	5	3	.119	0
Eddie Malone, C	55	170	17	46	7	2	1	16	29	19	.271	2
Catfish Metkovich, CF, LF	93	338	50	80	9	4	5	45	41	24	.237	5
Cass Michaels, 2B	154	561	73	173	27	9	6	83	101	50	.308	5
Johnny Ostrowski, LF, 3B	49	158	19	42	9	4	5	31	15	41	.266	4
Dave Philley, RF	146	598	84	171	20	8	0	44	54	51	.286	13
Earl Rapp, LF, RF	19	54	3	14	1	1	0	11	5	6	.259	1
Bobby Rhawn, 3B, SS	24	73	12	15	4	1	0	5	12	8	.205	0
Jerry Scala, CF	37	120	17	30	7	1	1	13	17	19	.250	3
Pat Seerey, RF	4	4	1	0	0	0	0	0	3	1	.000	0
Bud Souchock, LF, 1B	84	252	29	59	13	5	7	37	25	38	.234	5
Joe Tipton, C	67	191	20	39	5	3	3	19	27	17	.204	1
Don Wheeler, C	67	192	17	46	9	2	1	22	27	19	.240	2
George Yankowski, C	12	18	0	3	1	0	0	2	0	2	.167	0
Gus Zernial, LF	73	198	29	63	17	2	5	38	15	26	.318	0

Player	G	AB	R	H	2B	3B	HR	RBI	BB	SO	AVG	SB
Fred Bradley, P	1	1	0	0	0	0	0	0	0	1	.000	0
Jack Bruner, P	4	1	0	0	0	0	0	0	0	1	.000	0
Bob Cain, P	6	3	0	0	0	0	0	0	0	1	.000	0
Bill Evans, P	4	1	0	0	0	0	0	0	0	0	.000	0
Al Gettel, P	19	18	2	3	0	0	0	0	2	2	.167	0
Randy Gumpert, P	34	84	7	16	1	0	0	6	3	16	.190	0
Mickey Haefner, P	14	23	0	6	0	0	0	0	4	7	.261	0
Howie Judson, P	26	31	0	2	1	0	0	2	1	11	.065	0
Ed Klieman, P	18	8	1	2	0	0	0	0	0	2	.250	0
Bob Kuzava, P	29	56	1	2	0	0	0	1	3	19	.036	0
Billy Pierce, P	39	51	7	9	0	0	0	2	5	15	.176	0
Marino Pieretti, P	48	38	6	9	1	0	0	3	0	7	.237	0
Clyde Shoun, P	16	5	1	1	0	0	0	1	1	0	.200	0
Max Surkont, P	44	22	1	1	0	0	0	2	4	12	.045	0
Bill Wight, P	35	85	7	14	3	0	0	6	6	27	.165	0
Team totals	154	5204	648	1340	207	66	43	591	702	593	.257	62

=== Pitching ===
Note: W = Wins; L = Losses; ERA = Earned run average; G = Games pitched; GS = Games started; SV = Saves; IP = Innings pitched; H = Hits allowed; R = Runs allowed; ER = Earned runs allowed; HR = Home runs allowed; BB = Walks allowed; K = Strikeouts

Player	W	L	ERA	G	GS	SV	IP	H	R	ER	HR	BB	K
Fred Bradley	0	0	13.50	1	1	0	2.0	4	3	3	0	3	0
Jack Bruner	1	2	8.22	4	2	0	7.2	10	7	7	0	8	4
Bob Cain	0	0	2.45	6	0	1	11.0	7	3	3	0	5	5
Alex Carrasquel	0	0	14.73	3	0	0	3.2	8	6	6	1	4	1
Bill Evans	0	1	7.11	4	0	0	6.1	6	6	5	0	8	1
Al Gettel	2	5	6.43	19	7	1	63.0	69	48	45	12	26	22
Ernest Groth	0	1	5.40	3	0	0	5.0	2	3	3	2	3	1
Orval Grove	0	0	54.00	1	0	0	0.2	4	4	4	1	1	1
Randy Gumpert	13	16	3.81	34	32	1	234.0	223	111	99	22	83	78
Mickey Haefner	4	6	4.37	14	12	1	80.1	84	40	39	9	41	17
Howie Judson	1	14	4.58	26	12	1	108.0	114	65	55	13	70	36
Ed Klieman	2	0	3.00	18	0	3	33.0	33	15	11	2	15	9
Bob Kuzava	10	6	4.02	29	18	0	156.2	139	76	70	6	91	83
Billy Pierce	7	15	3.88	32	26	0	171.2	145	89	74	11	112	95
Marino Pieretti	4	6	5.51	39	9	4	116.0	131	77	71	10	54	25
Clyde Shoun	1	1	5.79	16	0	0	23.1	37	17	15	1	13	8
Max Surkont	3	5	4.78	44	2	4	96.0	92	61	51	9	60	38
Bill Wight	15	13	3.31	35	33	1	245.0	254	106	90	9	96	78
Team totals	63	91	4.30	154	154	17	1363.1	1362	737	651	108	693	502

== Farm system ==
Level	Team	League	Manager
AA	Memphis Chicks	Southern Association	Al Todd
A	Muskegon Reds	Central League	Red Ruffing
A	Charleston Rebels	Sally League	Herb Crompton and Albert Fisher
B	Fall River Indians	New England League	Dick Porter
B	Waterloo White Hawks	Illinois–Indiana–Iowa League	Bennie Huffman and Fred Shaffer
C	Stockton Ports	California League	Nino Bongiovanni
C	Hot Springs Bathers	Cotton States League	Pete Fox and Glen Stewart
C	Oil City Refiners	Middle Atlantic League	Otto Denning
C	Superior Blues	Northern League	Chips Sobek
D	Madisonville Miners	KITTY League	Joe DiMasi
D	Seminole Oilers	Sooner State League	Hugh Willingham and Paul Schoendienst
D	Wisconsin Rapids White Sox	Wisconsin State League	Glen Stewart and George Mitro

LEAGUE CHAMPIONS: Madisonville
Fall River club folded, July 19, 1949
