= 1947 Cleveland Indians season =

1947 Cleveland Indians
- League: American League
- Ballpark: Cleveland Municipal Stadium
- City: Cleveland, Ohio
- Owners: Bill Veeck
- General managers: Bill Veeck
- Managers: Lou Boudreau
- Radio: WGAR (AM) (Jack Graney, Van Patrick)

The 1947 Cleveland Indians season was the 47th in franchise history. On July 5, Larry Doby broke the American League color barrier. Doby was signed by the Indians by owner and team president Bill Veeck in July, 11 weeks after Jackie Robinson appeared with the Brooklyn Dodgers in the National League. In his rookie season, Doby went 5-for-32 (.156) in 29 games.

== Offseason ==
- November 1, 1946: Gus Zernial was drafted by the Indians from the Atlanta Crackers in the 1946 rule 5 draft.

== Regular season ==
- July 5: In a game against the Chicago White Sox, Larry Doby became the first black player to appear in an American League game. Doby pinch-hit for pitcher Bryan Stephens in the seventh inning and struck out against Earl Harrist.

=== Season standings ===
American League
| Team | W | L | Pct. | GB | Home | Road |
|---|---|---|---|---|---|---|
| New York Yankees | 97 | 57 | .630 | — | 55‍–‍22 | 42‍–‍35 |
| Detroit Tigers | 85 | 69 | .552 | 12 | 46‍–‍31 | 39‍–‍38 |
| Boston Red Sox | 83 | 71 | .539 | 14 | 49‍–‍30 | 34‍–‍41 |
| Cleveland Indians | 80 | 74 | .519 | 17 | 38‍–‍39 | 42‍–‍35 |
| Philadelphia Athletics | 78 | 76 | .506 | 19 | 39‍–‍38 | 39‍–‍38 |
| Chicago White Sox | 70 | 84 | .455 | 27 | 32‍–‍43 | 38‍–‍41 |
| Washington Senators | 64 | 90 | .416 | 33 | 36‍–‍41 | 28‍–‍49 |
| St. Louis Browns | 59 | 95 | .383 | 38 | 29‍–‍48 | 30‍–‍47 |

=== Record vs. opponents ===
1947 American League record Sources:
| Team | BOS | CWS | CLE | DET | NYY | PHA | SLB | WSH |
|---|---|---|---|---|---|---|---|---|
| Boston | — | 16–6–1 | 9–13 | 12–10–1 | 9–13 | 10–12–1 | 15–7 | 12–10 |
| Chicago | 6–16–1 | — | 11–11 | 7–15 | 10–12 | 11–11 | 11–11 | 14–8 |
| Cleveland | 13–9 | 11–11 | — | 8–14–2 | 7–15 | 11–11–1 | 17–5 | 13–9 |
| Detroit | 10–12–1 | 15–7 | 14–8–2 | — | 8–14–1 | 11–11 | 15–7 | 12–10 |
| New York | 13–9 | 12–10 | 15–7 | 14–8–1 | — | 13–9 | 15–7 | 15–7 |
| Philadelphia | 12–10–1 | 11–11 | 11–11–1 | 11–11 | 9–13 | — | 13–9 | 11–11 |
| St. Louis | 7–15 | 11–11 | 5–17 | 7–15 | 7–15 | 9–13 | — | 13–9 |
| Washington | 10–12 | 8–14 | 9–13 | 10–12 | 7–15 | 11–11 | 9–13 | — |

=== Notable transactions ===
- April 2, 1947: Catfish Metkovich was purchased by the Indians from the Boston Red Sox.
- April 23, 1947: Gus Zernial was purchased from the Indians by the Chicago White Sox.

=== Roster ===
1947 Cleveland Indians
Roster
| Pitchers: 17 Gene Bearden; 35 Don Black; 9 Cal Dorsett; 22 Red Embree; 19 Bob Feller; 24 Al Gettel; 25 Steve Gromek; 29 Ernest Groth; 18 Mel Harder; 16 Ed Klieman; 26 Bob Kuzava; 21 Bob Lemon; 3 Lyman Linde; 28 Bryan Stephens; 29 Les Willis; 20 Roger Wolff | Catchers: 10 Jim Hegan; 12 Al López; 11 Hank Ruszkowski; Infielders: 2 Eddie Bockman; 5 Lou Boudreau; 7 Jack Conway; 14 Larry Doby; 8 Les Fleming; 4 Joe Gordon; 6 Ken Keltner; 3 Eddie Robinson; 17 Al Rosen | Outfielders: 32 Hank Edwards; 36 Joe Frazier; 35 Felix Mackiewicz; 31 Catfish Metkovich; 33 Dale Mitchell; 34 Hal Peck; 30 Pat Seerey; 36 Ted Sepkowski; Other batters: 26 Heinz Becker; 1 Jimmy Wasdell | Manager: 5 Lou Boudreau; Coaches: 41 Bill McKechnie; 40 Ski Melillo; 43 Tris Speaker; 42 George Susce |

== Player stats ==
=== Batting ===
==== Starters by position ====
Note: Pos = Position; G = Games played; AB = At bats; H = Hits; Avg. = Batting average; HR = Home runs; RBI = Runs batted in

| Pos | Player | G | AB | H | Avg. | HR | RBI |
|---|---|---|---|---|---|---|---|
| C | Jim Hegan | 135 | 378 | 94 | .249 | 4 | 42 |
| 1B | Eddie Robinson | 95 | 318 | 78 | .245 | 14 | 52 |
| 2B | Joe Gordon | 155 | 562 | 153 | .272 | 29 | 93 |
| SS | Lou Boudreau | 150 | 538 | 165 | .307 | 4 | 67 |
| 3B | Ken Keltner | 151 | 541 | 139 | .257 | 11 | 76 |
| OF | Hank Edwards | 108 | 393 | 102 | .260 | 15 | 59 |
| OF | George Metkovich | 126 | 473 | 120 | .254 | 5 | 40 |
| OF | Dale Mitchell | 123 | 493 | 156 | .316 | 1 | 34 |

==== Other batters ====
Note: G = Games played; AB = At bats; H = Hits; Avg. = Batting average; HR = Home runs; RBI = Runs batted in

| Player | G | AB | H | Avg. | HR | RBI |
|---|---|---|---|---|---|---|
| Hal Peck | 114 | 392 | 115 | .293 | 8 | 44 |
| Les Fleming | 103 | 281 | 68 | .242 | 4 | 43 |
| Pat Seerey | 82 | 216 | 37 | .171 | 11 | 29 |
| Al López | 61 | 126 | 33 | .262 | 0 | 14 |
| Eddie Bockman | 46 | 66 | 17 | .258 | 1 | 14 |
| Jack Conway | 34 | 50 | 9 | .180 | 0 | 5 |
| Larry Doby | 29 | 32 | 5 | .156 | 0 | 2 |
| Hank Ruszkowski | 23 | 27 | 7 | .259 | 3 | 4 |
| Joe Frazier | 9 | 14 | 1 | .071 | 0 | 0 |
| Al Rosen | 7 | 9 | 1 | .111 | 0 | 0 |
| Ted Sepkowski | 10 | 8 | 1 | .125 | 0 | 0 |
| Felix Mackiewicz | 2 | 5 | 0 | .000 | 0 | 0 |
| Heinz Becker | 2 | 2 | 0 | .000 | 0 | 0 |
| Jimmy Wasdell | 1 | 1 | 0 | .000 | 0 | 0 |

=== Pitching ===
==== Starting pitchers ====
Note: G = Games pitched; IP = Innings pitched; W = Wins; L = Losses; ERA = Earned run average; SO = Strikeouts

| Player | G | IP | W | L | ERA | SO |
|---|---|---|---|---|---|---|
| Bob Feller | 42 | 299.0 | 20 | 11 | 2.68 | 196 |
| Don Black | 30 | 190.2 | 10 | 12 | 3.92 | 72 |
| Red Embree | 27 | 162.2 | 8 | 10 | 3.15 | 56 |
| Al Gettel | 31 | 149.0 | 11 | 10 | 3.20 | 64 |
| Mel Harder | 15 | 80.0 | 6 | 4 | 4.50 | 17 |

==== Other pitchers ====
Note: G = Games pitched; IP = Innings pitched; W = Wins; L = Losses; ERA = Earned run average; SO = Strikeouts

| Player | G | IP | W | L | ERA | SO |
|---|---|---|---|---|---|---|
| Bob Kuzava | 4 | 21.2 | 1 | 1 | 4.15 | 9 |
| Roger Wolff | 7 | 16.0 | 0 | 0 | 3.94 | 5 |
| Ernest Groth | 2 | 1.1 | 0 | 0 | 0.00 | 1 |
| Cal Dorsett | 2 | 1.1 | 0 | 0 | 27.00 | 1 |
| Lyman Linde | 1 | 0.2 | 0 | 0 | 27.00 | 0 |
| Gene Bearden | 1 | 0.1 | 0 | 0 | 81.00 | 0 |

==== Relief pitchers ====
Note: G = Games pitched; W = Wins; L = Losses; SV = Saves; ERA = Earned run average; SO = Strikeouts

| Player | G | W | L | SV | ERA | SO |
|---|---|---|---|---|---|---|
| Ed Klieman | 58 | 5 | 4 | 17 | 3.03 | 21 |
| Bob Lemon | 37 | 11 | 5 | 3 | 3.44 | 65 |
| Bryan Stephens | 31 | 5 | 10 | 1 | 4.01 | 34 |
| Steve Gromek | 29 | 3 | 5 | 4 | 3.74 | 39 |
| Les Willis | 22 | 0 | 2 | 1 | 3.48 | 10 |

== Awards and honors ==
All-Star Game

Lou Boudreau, Shortstop, starter

Bob Feller, Pitcher (replaced due to injury)

Joe Gordon, Second baseman, starter

Jim Hegan, Catcher, reserve

== Farm system ==
| Level | Team | League | Manager |
|---|---|---|---|
| AAA | Baltimore Orioles | International League | Alphonse "Tommy" Thomas |
| AA | Oklahoma City Indians | Texas League | Roy Schalk and Pat Ankenman |
| A | Wilkes-Barre Barons | Eastern League | Bill Norman |
| B | Harrisburg Senators | Interstate League | Les Bell |
| B | Meridian Peps | Southeastern League | Roxie Lawson |
| B | Spartanburg Peaches | Tri-State League | Kerby Farrell |
| C | Tucson Cowboys | Arizona–Texas League | Joe Vosmik |
| C | Bakersfield Indians | California League | Tony Governor |
| C | Pittsfield Electrics | Canadian–American League | Tony Rensa |
| C | Burlington Indians | Central Association | Paul O'Dea |
| C | Jacksonville Jax | Lone Star League | Linville Watkins |
| D | Cordele Indians | Georgia–Florida League | Mercer Harris |
| D | Union City Greyhounds | KITTY League | Stephen Bysco |
| D | Dayton Indians | Ohio State League | Ival Goodman |
| D | Batavia Clippers | PONY League | Jack Tighe |
| D | Ardmore Indians | Sooner State League | Dutch Prather |
| D | Green Bay Blue Jays | Wisconsin State League | Harry Griswold |
