= 1949 Cleveland Indians season =

1949 Cleveland Indians
- League: American League
- Ballpark: Cleveland Municipal Stadium
- City: Cleveland, Ohio
- Owners: Bill Veeck, Ellis Ryan
- General managers: Bill Veeck
- Managers: Lou Boudreau
- Television: WEWS-TV (Bob Neal, Tris Speaker)
- Radio: WJW (Jack Graney, Jimmy Dudley)

The 1949 season was the 49th season in the history of the Cleveland Indians. The club entered the season as the defending World Champions. On March 5, 1949, Indians minority owner Bob Hope donned a Cleveland Indians uniform and posed with manager Lou Boudreau and vice president Hank Greenberg as the World Series champions opened spring training camp in Tucson, Arizona.

== Offseason ==
- November 15, 1948: 1948 minor league draft
  - Bob Chakales was drafted by the Indians from the Philadelphia Phillies.
  - Grant Dunlap was drafted from the Indians by the New York Yankees.
- December 14, 1948: Ed Klieman, Joe Haynes, and Eddie Robinson were traded by the Indians to the Washington Senators for Mickey Vernon and Early Wynn.
- Prior to 1949 season: Brooks Lawrence was signed as an amateur free agent by the Indians.

== Regular season ==
Following their 1948 World Series championship, the 1949 Indians season proved to be a disappointment. Despite having the best overall pitching and fielding statistics in either the American or National Leagues, the Indians finished a distant third place behind the New York Yankees and Boston Red Sox. A team roster that boasted eight future members of the Baseball Hall of Fame (Lou Boudreau, Larry Doby, Bob Feller, Joe Gordon, Bob Lemon, Satchel Paige, Minnie Miñoso, and Early Wynn) could not deliver a second consecutive championship to Cleveland. During the season, Indians fan Charlie Lupica spent 117 days on a flagpole, waiting for the Indians to regain first place. They never did, and he gave up his pursuit when the Indians were mathematically eliminated on September 25.

=== Season standings ===
American League
Team	W	L	Pct.	GB	Home	Road
New York Yankees	97	57	.630	—	54‍–‍23	43‍–‍34
Boston Red Sox	96	58	.623	1	61‍–‍16	35‍–‍42
Cleveland Indians	89	65	.578	8	49‍–‍28	40‍–‍37
Detroit Tigers	87	67	.565	10	50‍–‍27	37‍–‍40
Philadelphia Athletics	81	73	.526	16	52‍–‍25	29‍–‍48
Chicago White Sox	63	91	.409	34	32‍–‍45	31‍–‍46
St. Louis Browns	53	101	.344	44	36‍–‍41	17‍–‍60
Washington Senators	50	104	.325	47	26‍–‍51	24‍–‍53

=== Record vs. opponents ===
1949 American League record Sources:
Team	BOS	CWS	CLE	DET	NYY	PHA	SLB	WSH
Boston	—	17–5	8–14	15–7–1	9–13	14–8	15–7	18–4
Chicago	5–17	—	7–15	8–14	7–15	6–16	15–7	15–7
Cleveland	14–8	15–7	—	13–9	10–12	9–13	15–7	13–9
Detroit	7–15–1	14–8	9–13	—	11–11	14–8	14–8	18–4
New York	13–9	15–7	12–10	11–11	—	14–8	17–5–1	15–7
Philadelphia	8–14	16–6	13–9	8–14	8–14	—	12–10	16–6
St. Louis	7–15	7–15	7–15	8–14	5–17–1	10–12	—	9–13
Washington	4–18	7–15	9–13	4–18	7–15	6–16	13–9	—

=== Notable transactions ===
- April 28, 1949: Grant Dunlap was returned to the Indians by the New York Yankees.

=== Opening Day Lineup ===
Opening Day Starters
#	Name	Position
34	Dale Mitchell	LF
37	Larry Doby	CF
5	Lou Boudreau	SS
4	Joe Gordon	2B
3	Mickey Vernon	1B
6	Ken Keltner	3B
33	Bob Kennedy	RF
10	Jim Hegan	C
19	Bob Feller	P

=== Roster ===
1949 Cleveland Indians
Roster
Pitchers: 30 Gene Bearden; 22 Al Benton; 19 Bob Feller; 25 Mike Garcia; 27 Steve Gromek; 21 Bob Lemon; 29 Satchel Paige; 26 Frank Papish; 24 Early Wynn; 20 Sam Zoldak	Catchers: 10 Jim Hegan; 11 Mike Tresh; Infielders: 1 Bobby Ávila; 2 Johnny Berardino; 8 Ray Boone; 5 Lou Boudreau; 4 Joe Gordon; 6 Ken Keltner; 7 Al Rosen; 3 Mickey Vernon	Outfielders: 31 Allie Clark; 37,14 Larry Doby; 9 Luke Easter; 32 Hank Edwards; 33 Bob Kennedy; 18 Minnie Miñoso; 34 Dale Mitchell; 17 Milt Nielsen; 36 Hal Peck; 9 Herman Reich; 38 Thurman Tucker; Other batters: 15 Fred Marsh	Manager: 5 Lou Boudreau; Coaches: 43 Mel Harder (Pitching); 41 Bill McKechnie (Third base); 45 Steve O'Neill; 42 Muddy Ruel; 44 George Susce

== Player stats ==
= Indicates team leader

= Indicates league leader

=== Batting ===
==== Starters by position ====
Note: Pos = Position; G = Games played; AB = At bats; H = Hits; Avg. = Batting average; HR = Home runs; RBI = Runs batted in

Pos	Player	G	AB	H	Avg.	HR	RBI
C	Jim Hegan	152	468	105	.224	8	55
1B	Mickey Vernon	153	584	170	.291	18	83
2B	Joe Gordon	148	533	136	.251	20	84
SS	Lou Boudreau	134	475	135	.284	4	60
3B	Ken Keltner	80	246	57	.232	8	30
OF	Dale Mitchell	149	640	203	.317	3	56
OF	Larry Doby	147	547	153	.280	24	85
OF	Bob Kennedy	121	424	117	.276	9	57

==== Other batters ====
Note: G = Games played; AB = At bats; H = Hits; Avg. = Batting average; HR = Home runs; RBI = Runs batted in

Player	G	AB	H	Avg.	HR	RBI
Ray Boone	86	258	65	.252	4	26
Thurman Tucker	80	197	48	.244	0	14
Johnny Berardino	50	116	23	.198	0	13
Allie Clark	35	74	13	.176	1	9
Luke Easter	21	45	10	.222	0	2
Al Rosen	23	44	7	.159	0	5
Mike Tresh	38	37	8	.216	0	1
Hal Peck	33	29	9	.310	0	9
Minnie Miñoso	9	16	3	.188	1	1
Hank Edwards	5	15	4	.267	1	1
Bobby Ávila	31	14	3	.214	0	3
Milt Nielsen	3	9	1	.111	0	0
Herman Reich	1	2	1	.500	0	0
Fred Marsh	1	0	0	.---	0	0

=== Pitching ===
==== Starting pitchers ====
Note: G = Games pitched; IP = Innings pitched; W = Wins; L = Losses; ERA = Earned run average; SO = Strikeouts

Player	G	IP	W	L	ERA	SO
Bob Lemon	37	279.2	22	10	2.99	138
Bob Feller	36	211.0	15	14	3.75	108
Early Wynn	26	164.2	11	7	4.15	62
Gene Bearden	32	127.0	8	8	5.10	41

==== Other pitchers ====
Note: G = Games pitched; IP = Innings pitched; W = Wins; L = Losses; ERA = Earned run average; SO = Strikeouts

Player	G	IP	W	L	ERA	SO
Steve Gromek	40	92.0	4	6	3.33	22
Sam Zoldak	27	53.0	1	2	4.25	11

==== Relief pitchers ====
Note: G = Games pitched; W = Wins; L = Losses; SV = Saves; ERA = Earned run average; SO = Strikeouts

Player	G	W	L	SV	ERA	SO
Al Benton	40	9	6	10	2.12	41
Mike Garcia	41	14	5	2	2.36	94
Satchel Paige	31	4	7	5	3.04	54
Frank Papish	25	1	0	1	3.19	23

== Awards and honors ==
- Dale Mitchell, American League leader, triples (23)
- Team ERA of 3.36 lowest in MLB for 1949
- Team fielding percentage of .983 highest in MLB for 1949

All Star Game

Larry Doby, Outfielder, reserve

Joe Gordon, Second baseman, reserve

Jim Hegan, Catcher, reserve

Bob Lemon, Pitcher, reserve

Dale Mitchell, Outfielder, reserve

== Farm system ==
Level	Team	League	Manager
AAA	San Diego Padres	Pacific Coast League	Bucky Harris
AA	Oklahoma City Indians	Texas League	Joe Vosmik
A	Dayton Indians	Central League	Ski Melillo
A	Wilkes-Barre Barons	Eastern League	Bill Norman
B	St. Petersburg Saints	Florida International League	Myril Hoag, Harry Sullivan, Johnny Beazley and Dick Porter
B	Harrisburg Senators	Interstate League	Les Bell
B	Spartanburg Peaches	Tri-State League	Kerby Farrell
C	Tucson Cowboys	Arizona–Texas League	Gene Lillard
C	Bakersfield Indians	California League	Harry Griswold
C	Pittsfield Indians	Canadian–American League	Gene Hasson
C	Burlington Indians	Central Association	Lloyd Brown
D	Cordele Indians	Georgia–Florida League	Hal Lee
D	Iola Indians	Kansas–Oklahoma–Missouri League	Winlow Johnson
D	Union City Greyhounds	KITTY League	Tony Rensa and Rudy York
D	Stroudsburg Poconos	North Atlantic League	Frank Radler
D	Zanesville Indians	Ohio–Indiana League	Pat McLaughlin
D	Batavia Clippers	PONY League	Ed Kobesky
D	Green Bay Blue Jays	Wisconsin State League	Phil Seghi

LEAGUE CHAMPIONS: Stroudsburg
