= Billy Bowers =

Billy Bowers may refer to:

- Billy Bowers (baseball) (1922–1996), American MLB player
- Billy Bowers (actor), American actor
- Billy Bowers, vocalist with The Blind Boys of Alabama

== See also ==
- Bill Bowers (born 1959), American mime artist and actor
- William Bowers (disambiguation)
