= Ernest Groth =

American baseball player (1922–2004)

- Pitcher
- Born: May 3, 1922; Beaver Falls, Pennsylvania, U.S.
- Died: December 27, 2004 (aged 82); Beaver, Pennsylvania, U.S.
- Batted: Right Threw: Right

MLB debut
- September 11, 1947, for the Cleveland Indians

Last MLB appearance
- May 4, 1949, for the Chicago White Sox

MLB statistics
- Win–loss record: 0–1
- Earned run average: 4.91
- Strikeouts: 2
- Stats at Baseball Reference

Teams
- Cleveland Indians (1947–1948); Chicago White Sox (1949)

Ernest William Groth (May 3, 1922 – December 27, 2004) was an American Major League Baseball right-handed pitcher who played for three seasons. He played for the Cleveland Indians during the 1947 and 1948 seasons and the Chicago White Sox during the 1949 season. In four career games, Groth pitched 7 1/3 innings and had a 4.91 earned run average (ERA).

Born and raised in Pennsylvania, Groth began his professional career in the Wisconsin State League in 1942. After his rookie season, he spent the next three years serving in the military during World War II. After he returned, he spent more time in the minor leagues, then spent parts of the 1947 and 1948 seasons with the Cleveland Indians. After the end of the 1948 season, he was traded to the Chicago White Sox, and played with them in 1949. He spent the next seven seasons pitching in the minor leagues, retiring at the end of the 1956 season. After his retirement, he ran Groth's Nursery and worked for Standard Steel, and died in 2004.

== Early life and minor leagues ==
Groth was born in Beaver Falls, Pennsylvania to William T. and Clara Court Groth. He played American Legion Baseball in East Palestine, Ohio in his teens, and attended Beaver Falls High School. He grew up pitching in the county league, and was both a right fielder and pitcher for the Chippewa Indians. After pitching for Chippewa in 1941, he was offered a contract for the 1942 season by the Pittsburgh Pirates. Groth turned down the offer instead signing with the Cleveland Indians, spending the 1942 season with the Indians' D-Class (Rookie League) affiliate, the Appleton Papermakers of the Wisconsin State League, where he played alongside future teammate Mike Garcia. In 26 games, he pitched in 203 innings, had a 16–10 win–loss record and a 3.59 ERA.

After the 1942 season, Groth spent the following three years serving with the United States Army in the Pacific Theater of Operations during World War II. After the war, he returned to baseball, spending the 1946 season with the Wilkes-Barre Barons, a Cleveland Indians minor league team that played in the Eastern League. His performances that season included a one-hitter against the Elmira Pioneers in the second game of a doubleheader on August 19. In 29 games, Groth finished with a 13–7 record and a 2.98 ERA. Shortly afterward, he became engaged to Blanche Klein, a fellow graduate of Beaver Falls High. The two were married shortly after.

== Cleveland Indians and Chicago White Sox ==
In 1947, Groth was promoted to the Oklahoma City Indians of the Texas League, the Cleveland Indians' AA-class minor league affiliate. In 33 games with Oklahoma City, he threw 180 innings and finished the season with a 7–11 record and a 3.45 ERA. After the minor league season ended in September, Groth was called up to the Cleveland Indians major league roster, and made his debut on September 11, 1947. He pitched in one more game, finishing the season having pitched 1 1/3 innings, striking out one batter and not allowing a run.

Groth was looking to stay in the major league in 1948. He spent spring training on the Indians' roster, and originally made a great impression on the team. However, he was one of seven Indians stricken with dysentery in early April, causing him to miss some time. By the end of spring training, Groth was optioned to the Baltimore Orioles of the International League, the Indians' AAA-class minor league affiliate. He spent the season with the Orioles, and his pitching performances included a 13–0 victory over the Newark Bears, as well as a 1–0 victory where Groth limited the Bears to three hits. Groth finished the season with Baltimore having amassed 29 pitching appearances, 27 of them starts, a 12–12 record and a 4.48 ERA, while also pitching in two games for the Dallas Eagles. After Baltimore's season ended, he was promoted to the Indians' roster, and pitched in one game for the Indians that season.

At the end of the 1948 season, on December 2, the Indians traded Groth to the Chicago White Sox along with Bob Kuzava for Frank Papish. After signing a contract with the White Sox, Groth took part in spring, training alongside many other newcomers to the White Sox, where his pitching performance earned him a place on the major league roster. He pitched in three games for the White Sox, losing one, and finished his tenure with the White Sox with a 5.40 ERA in five innings pitched. After his final game on May 4, the White Sox purchased Ed Klieman and sold Groth to the Kansas City Blues, a New York Yankees minor league team, ending his major league career.

== Return to minor leagues ==
Groth spent the 1949 season with the Kansas City Blues, finishing with a 12–9 record, a 4.28 ERA, and 162 innings pitched. When the 1950 season began, the New York Yankees had five holdouts (players who wanted more money and would not sign their contracts). Groth was one of them, and was the only minor leaguer to hold out. He eventually signed his contract with Kansas City, and after spring training ended, Groth was sent to the Oakland Oaks of the Pacific Coast League, the Yankees' AAA minor league affiliate. The Yankees sent Groth to the Oaks to make up for sending over George Earl Toolson last season, who the Oaks had to return because his condition was poor. Groth finished the season with a 7–11 record and a 5.09 ERA. In January 1951, the Oaks sold Groth to the Baltimore Orioles of the International League, now a farm team of the Philadelphia Phillies. He struggled in ten appearances, finishing with an ERA of 7.58, and was sent to the Chattanooga Lookouts, the AA minor league team of the Washington Senators. He pitched in 26 games for the Lookouts, finishing with a 3–8 record and a 6.29 ERA.

For the next five seasons, Groth played for the Oklahoma City Indians of the Texas League. He was sold to Oklahoma City by Baltimore in December 1951. In his first season with Oklahoma City, he finished with a 15–12 record, a 3.43 ERA, and 207 innings pitched. The following season, Groth started things off with a victory in an early appearance against the Dallas Eagles where he allowed only four hits. He finished the season with an 8–8 record and a 5.37 ERA. In 1954, Groth improved his pitching, finishing the season with a 14–11 record and a 3.75 ERA. After a 9–13 season in 1955, Groth split time between Oklahoma City and the Tulsa Oilers in 1956, finishing the season with a combined 9–16 record. He ended his professional career after the 1956 season.

== Later life ==
After retiring from baseball, Groth returned to his hometown of Beaver Falls. He and his family ran Groth's Nursery, and he worked for Standard Steel until his retirement. He and his wife had three daughters; Elizabeth, Constance, and Suellen. Groth was inducted into the Beaver County Sports Hall of Fame in 1990. He also spent time playing in local golf tournaments. Groth died on December 27, 2004.
