= 1949 Detroit Tigers season =

Major League Baseball season

1949 Detroit Tigers
- League: American League
- Ballpark: Briggs Stadium
- City: Detroit, Michigan
- Record: 87–67 (.565)
- League place: 4th
- Owners: Walter Briggs, Sr.
- General managers: Billy Evans
- Managers: Red Rolfe
- Television: WWJ (Harry Heilmann, Paul Williams, Ty Tyson)
- Radio: WJBK (Harry Heilmann, Van Patrick)

The 1949 Detroit Tigers season was a season in American baseball. The team finished fourth in the American League with a record of 87–67, 10 games behind the New York Yankees.

== Offseason ==
- November 10, 1948: Marv Grissom was drafted by the Tigers from the Sacramento Solons in the 1948 rule 5 draft.

== Regular season ==
Tigers third baseman George Kell beat Ted Williams of the Boston Red Sox for the American League batting title by 0.0002 percentage points (.3429 to .3427).

=== Season standings ===
American League
Team	W	L	Pct.	GB	Home	Road
New York Yankees	97	57	.630	—	54‍–‍23	43‍–‍34
Boston Red Sox	96	58	.623	1	61‍–‍16	35‍–‍42
Cleveland Indians	89	65	.578	8	49‍–‍28	40‍–‍37
Detroit Tigers	87	67	.565	10	50‍–‍27	37‍–‍40
Philadelphia Athletics	81	73	.526	16	52‍–‍25	29‍–‍48
Chicago White Sox	63	91	.409	34	32‍–‍45	31‍–‍46
St. Louis Browns	53	101	.344	44	36‍–‍41	17‍–‍60
Washington Senators	50	104	.325	47	26‍–‍51	24‍–‍53

=== Record vs. opponents ===
1949 American League record Sources:
Team	BOS	CWS	CLE	DET	NYY	PHA	SLB	WSH
Boston	—	17–5	8–14	15–7–1	9–13	14–8	15–7	18–4
Chicago	5–17	—	7–15	8–14	7–15	6–16	15–7	15–7
Cleveland	14–8	15–7	—	13–9	10–12	9–13	15–7	13–9
Detroit	7–15–1	14–8	9–13	—	11–11	14–8	14–8	18–4
New York	13–9	15–7	12–10	11–11	—	14–8	17–5–1	15–7
Philadelphia	8–14	16–6	13–9	8–14	8–14	—	12–10	16–6
St. Louis	7–15	7–15	7–15	8–14	5–17–1	10–12	—	9–13
Washington	4–18	7–15	9–13	4–18	7–15	6–16	13–9	—

=== Roster ===
1949 Detroit Tigers
Roster
Pitchers: 30 Ted Gray; 19 Marv Grissom; 12 Art Houtteman; 29,37 Fred Hutchinson; 36 Lou Kretlow; 16 Hal Newhouser; 18 Stubby Overmire; 23 Saul Rogovin; 24 Marlin Stuart; 11 Dizzy Trout; 22 Virgil Trucks; 26 Hal White	Catchers: 25 Hank Riebe; 1 Aaron Robinson; 9 Bob Swift; Infielders: 8 Neil Berry; 15 Paul Campbell; 21 George Kell; 17 Don Kolloway; 7 Eddie Lake; 2 Johnny Lipon; 5 George Vico	Outfielders: 14 Hoot Evers; 3 Johnny Groth; 6 Pat Mullin; 4 Dick Wakefield; 20 Vic Wertz; Other batters: 30 Don Lund; 30 Bob Mavis; 27 Jimmy Outlaw; 32 Earl Rapp	Manager: 10 Red Rolfe; Coaches: 28 Dick Bartell; 33 Ted Lyons

== Player stats ==
=== Batting ===
= Indicates team leader

= Indicates league leader

==== Starters by position ====
Note: Pos = Position; G = Games played; AB = At bats; H = Hits; Avg. = Batting average; HR = Home runs; RBI = Runs batted in

Pos	Player	G	AB	H	Avg.	HR	RBI
C	Aaron Robinson	110	331	89	.269	13	56
1B	Paul Campbell	87	255	71	.278	3	30
2B	Neil Berry	109	329	78	.237	0	18
SS	Johnny Lipon	127	439	110	.251	3	59
3B	George Kell	134	522	179	.343	3	59
OF	Johnny Groth	103	348	102	.293	11	73
OF	Hoot Evers	132	432	131	.303	7	72
OF	Vic Wertz	155	608	185	.304	20	133

==== Other batters ====
Note: G = Games played; AB = At bats; H = Hits; Avg. = Batting average; HR = Home runs; RBI = Runs batted in

Player	G	AB	H	Avg.	HR	RBI
Don Kolloway	126	483	142	.294	2	47
Pat Mullin	104	310	83	.268	12	59
Eddie Lake	94	240	47	.196	1	15
Bob Swift	74	189	45	.238	2	18
Sam Vico	67	142	27	.190	4	18
Dick Wakefield	59	126	26	.206	6	19
Hank Riebe	17	33	6	.182	0	2
Jimmy Outlaw	5	4	1	.250	0	0
Don Lund	2	2	0	.000	0	0
Earl Rapp	1	0	0	----	0	0
Bob Mavis	1	0	0	----	0	0

=== Pitching ===
==== Starting pitchers ====
Note: G = Games pitched; IP = Innings pitched; W = Wins; L = Losses; ERA = Earned run average; SO = Strikeouts

Player	G	IP	W	L	ERA	SO
Hal Newhouser	38	292.0	18	11	3.36	144
Virgil Trucks	41	275.0	19	11	2.81	153
Art Houtteman	34	203.2	15	10	3.71	85
Ted Gray	34	195.0	10	10	3.51	96

==== Other pitchers ====
Note: G = Games pitched; IP = Innings pitched; W = Wins; L = Losses; ERA = Earned run average; SO = Strikeouts

Player	G	IP	W	L	ERA	SO
Fred Hutchinson	33	188.2	15	7	2.96	54
Lou Kretlow	25	76.0	3	2	6.16	40
Marlin Stuart	14	29.2	0	2	9.10	14

==== Relief pitchers ====
Note: G = Games pitched; W = Wins; L = Losses; SV = Saves; ERA = Earned run average; SO = Strikeouts

Player	G	W	L	SV	ERA	SO
Dizzy Trout	33	3	6	3	4.40	19
Marv Grissom	27	2	4	0	6.41	17
Stubby Overmire	14	1	3	0	9.87	3
Hal White	9	1	0	2	0.00	4
Saul Rogovin	5	0	1	0	14.29	2

== Awards and honors ==
- George Kell, AL Batting champion

== Farm system ==
Level	Team	League	Manager
AAA	Toledo Mud Hens	American Association	Eddie Mayo
AAA	Buffalo Bisons	International League	Paul Richards
AA	Little Rock Travelers	Southern Association	Jack Saltzgaver
A	Flint Arrows	Central League	Jack Tighe
A	Williamsport Tigers	Eastern League	Gene Desautels
B	Durham Bulls	Carolina League	Ace Parker
B	Lynn Tigers	New England League	Pep Kennedy and Charles Webb
C	Rome Colonels	Canadian–American League	Clyde Smoll
C	Butler Tigers	Middle Atlantic League	Boom-Boom Beck
D	Troy Tigers	Alabama State League	Holt Milner
D	Thomasville Tigers	Georgia–Florida League	Ralph DiLullo
D	Jamestown Falcons	PONY League	Marv Olson

Lynn franchise folded, July 19, 1949
