= 1949 New York Yankees season =

Season for the Major League Baseball team the New York Yankees

1949 New York Yankees
- World Series champions American League champions
- League: American League
- Ballpark: Yankee Stadium
- City: New York City, New York
- Record: 97–57 (.630)
- League place: 1st
- Owners: Dan Topping and Del Webb
- General managers: George Weiss
- Managers: Casey Stengel
- Television: WABD (Dolly Stark)
- Radio: WINS (AM) (Mel Allen, Curt Gowdy)

The 1949 New York Yankees season was the team's 47th season. The team finished with a record of 97–57, winning their 16th pennant, finishing 1 game ahead of the Boston Red Sox. New York was managed by Casey Stengel in his first year. The Yankees played their home games at Yankee Stadium. In the World Series, they defeated the Brooklyn Dodgers in 5 games.

== Offseason ==
- November 15, 1948: Grant Dunlap was drafted by the Yankees from the Cleveland Indians in the 1948 minor league draft.
- Prior to 1949 season: Lou Skizas was signed as an amateur free agent by the Yankees.

== Regular season ==
The 1949 Yankees team was seen as "underdogs" who came from behind to catch and surprise the powerful Red Sox on the last two days of the season, a face off that fueled the beginning of the modern Yankees–Red Sox rivalry.

The Red Sox needed just one win in two games and were to pitch Mel Parnell in the first game. After trailing 4–0, the Yankees came back to beat Parnell 5–4, as Johnny Lindell hit an eighth-inning, game-winning, home run and Joe Page had a great relief appearance for New York. And so it came down to the last game of the season. It was Ellis Kinder facing Vic Raschi.

The Yankees led 1–0 after seven innings, having scored in the first. In the eighth inning, manager Joe McCarthy lifted Kinder for pinch hitter Tom Wright who walked but was erased in a double play, ending the inning. Then he brought in Mel Parnell in relief, and Parnell yielded a homer to Tommy Henrich and a single to Yogi Berra. Parnell was replaced by Tex Hughson, who had been on the disabled list and said his arm still hurt. But he came on and, with the bases loaded, Jerry Coleman hit a soft liner that Al Zarilla in right field tried to make a shoestring catch, but he missed and it went for a triple and three runs scored. In the ninth inning the Red Sox rallied for three runs but still fell short. The post-season proved to be a bit easier, as the Yankees defeated the Brooklyn Dodgers four games to one.

In 1949, Boston Red Sox owner Tom Yawkey and Yankees GM Larry MacPhail verbally agreed to trade DiMaggio for Ted Williams, but MacPhail refused to include Yogi Berra. Phil Rizzuto moved from eighth to first in the batting lineup and finished the season second in voting for the American League MVP Award.

=== Season standings ===
American League
Team	W	L	Pct.	GB	Home	Road
New York Yankees	97	57	.630	—	54‍–‍23	43‍–‍34
Boston Red Sox	96	58	.623	1	61‍–‍16	35‍–‍42
Cleveland Indians	89	65	.578	8	49‍–‍28	40‍–‍37
Detroit Tigers	87	67	.565	10	50‍–‍27	37‍–‍40
Philadelphia Athletics	81	73	.526	16	52‍–‍25	29‍–‍48
Chicago White Sox	63	91	.409	34	32‍–‍45	31‍–‍46
St. Louis Browns	53	101	.344	44	36‍–‍41	17‍–‍60
Washington Senators	50	104	.325	47	26‍–‍51	24‍–‍53

=== Record vs. opponents ===
1949 American League record Sources:
Team	BOS	CWS	CLE	DET	NYY	PHA	SLB	WSH
Boston	—	17–5	8–14	15–7–1	9–13	14–8	15–7	18–4
Chicago	5–17	—	7–15	8–14	7–15	6–16	15–7	15–7
Cleveland	14–8	15–7	—	13–9	10–12	9–13	15–7	13–9
Detroit	7–15–1	14–8	9–13	—	11–11	14–8	14–8	18–4
New York	13–9	15–7	12–10	11–11	—	14–8	17–5–1	15–7
Philadelphia	8–14	16–6	13–9	8–14	8–14	—	12–10	16–6
St. Louis	7–15	7–15	7–15	8–14	5–17–1	10–12	—	9–13
Washington	4–18	7–15	9–13	4–18	7–15	6–16	13–9	—

=== Notable transactions ===
- April 28, 1949: Grant Dunlap was returned by the Yankees to the Indians.

=== Roster ===
1949 New York Yankees
Roster
Pitchers: 12 Ralph Buxton; 28 Tommy Byrne; 26 Hugh Casey; 39 Frank Hiller; 39,52 Wally Hood; 30 Eddie Lopat; 19 Cuddles Marshall; 11 Joe Page; 35 Duane Pillette; 18 Bob Porterfield; 17 Vic Raschi; 22 Allie Reynolds; 21 Fred Sanford; 20 Spec Shea	Catchers: 8 Yogi Berra; 32 Ralph Houk; 38 Gus Niarhos; 29 Charlie Silvera; Infielders: 6 Bobby Brown; 42 Jerry Coleman; 41 Joe Collins; 24 Billy Johnson; 23 Dick Kryhoski; 36 Johnny Mize; 18, 23 Fenton Mole; 36 Jack Phillips; 10 Phil Rizzuto; 1 Snuffy Stirnweiss	Outfielders: 25 Hank Bauer; 52 Jim Delsing; 5 Joe DiMaggio; 15 Tommy Henrich; 9 Charlie Keller; 27 Johnny Lindell; 7 Cliff Mapes; 14 Gene Woodling; Other batters: 35 Mickey Witek	Manager: 37 Casey Stengel; Coaches: 2 Frankie Crosetti; 33 Bill Dickey; 31 Jim Turner

== Player stats ==
= Indicates team leader

=== Batting ===
==== Starters by position ====
Note: Pos = Position; G = Games played; AB = At bats; H = Hits; Avg. = Batting average; HR = Home runs; RBI = Runs batted in

Pos	Player	G	AB	H	Avg.	HR	RBI
C	Yogi Berra	116	415	155	.277	20	91
1B	Tommy Henrich	115	411	118	.287	24	85
2B	Jerry Coleman	128	447	123	.275	2	42
3B	Bobby Brown	104	343	97	.283	6	61
SS	Phil Rizzuto	153	614	169	.275	5	65
OF	Cliff Mapes	111	304	75	.247	7	38
OF	Gene Woodling	112	296	80	.270	5	44
OF	Hank Bauer	103	301	82	.272	10	45

==== Other batters ====
Note: G = Games played; AB = At bats; H = Hits; Avg. = Batting average; HR = Home runs; RBI = Runs batted in

Player	G	AB	H	Avg.	HR	RBI
Billy Johnson	113	329	82	.249	8	56
Joe DiMaggio	76	272	94	.346	14	67
Johnny Lindell	78	211	51	.242	6	27
Dick Kryhoski	54	177	52	.294	1	27
Snuffy Stirnweiss	70	157	41	.261	0	11
Charlie Silvera	58	130	41	.315	0	13
Charlie Keller	60	116	29	.250	3	16
Jack Phillips	45	91	28	.308	1	10
Gus Niarhos	32	43	12	.279	0	6
Fenton Mole	10	27	5	.185	0	2
Johnny Mize	13	23	6	.261	1	2
Jim Delsing	9	20	7	.350	1	3
Joe Collins	7	10	1	.100	0	4
Ralph Houk	5	7	4	.571	0	1
Mickey Witek	1	1	1	1.000	0	0

=== Pitching ===
= Indicates league leader

==== Starting pitchers ====
Note: G = Games pitched; IP = Innings pitched; W = Wins; L = Losses; ERA = Earned run average; SO = Strikeouts

Player	G	IP	W	L	ERA	SO
Vic Raschi	38	274.2	21	10	3.34	124
Ed Lopat	31	215.1	15	10	3.26	70
Allie Reynolds	35	213.2	17	6	4.00	105
Tommy Byrne	32	196.0	15	7	3.72	129

==== Other pitchers ====
Note: G = Games pitched; IP = Innings pitched; W = Wins; L = Losses; ERA = Earned run average; SO = Strikeouts

Player	G	IP	W	L	ERA	SO
Fred Sanford	29	95.1	7	3	3.87	51
Bob Porterfield	12	57.2	2	5	4.06	25
Duane Pillette	12	37.1	2	4	4.34	9

==== Relief pitchers ====
Note: G = Games pitched; W = Wins; L = Losses; SV = Saves; ERA = Earned run average; SO = Strikeouts

Player	G	W	L	SV	ERA	SO
Joe Page	60	13	8	27	2.59	99
Cuddles Marshall	21	3	0	3	5.11	13
Spec Shea	20	1	1	1	5.33	22
Ralph Buxton	14	0	1	2	4.05	14
Hugh Casey	4	1	0	0	8.22	5
Frank Hiller	4	0	2	1	5.87	3
Wally Hood	2	0	0	0	0.00	2

== 1949 World Series ==
AL New York Yankees (4) vs. NL Brooklyn Dodgers (1)

Game	Score	Date	Attendance
1	New York 1, Brooklyn 0	October 5	66,224
2	Brooklyn 1, New York 0	October 6	70,053
3	New York 4, Brooklyn 3	October 7	32,788
4	New York 6, Brooklyn 4	October 8	33,934
5	New York 10, Brooklyn 6	October 9	33,711

== Awards and honors ==
- Joe Page, Babe Ruth Award

All-Star Game

== Farm system ==
Level	Team	League	Manager
AAA	Kansas City Blues	American Association	Bill Skiff
AAA	Newark Bears	International League	Buddy Hassett
AA	Beaumont Exporters	Texas League	Chick Autry
A	Binghamton Triplets	Eastern League	George Selkirk
A	Augusta Tigers	Sally League	Alton Biggs and Jim Pruett
B	Quincy Gems	Illinois–Indiana–Iowa League	James Adlam
B	Manchester Yankees	New England League	Wally Berger
B	Norfolk Tars	Piedmont League	Earl Bolyard and Frank Novosel
B	Victoria Athletics	Western International League	Ted Norbert and Earl Bolyard
C	Ventura Yankees	California League	Bones Sanders
C	Amsterdam Rugmakers	Canadian–American League	Mayo Smith
C	Grand Forks Chiefs	Northern League	Eddie Kearse, Joe McDermott and Wally Berger
C	Twin Falls Cowboys	Pioneer League	Charlie Metro
C	Joplin Miners	Western Association	Johnny Sturm
D	Easton Yankees	Eastern Shore League	Jack Farmer
D	LaGrange Troupers	Georgia–Alabama League	Carl Cooper

Level	Team	League	Manager
D	Independence Yankees	Kansas–Oklahoma–Missouri League	Harry Craft
D	Belleville Stags	Mississippi–Ohio Valley League	Les Mueller, Joe Yurkovich, Addie Nesbit and Bunny Mick
D	Newark Yankees	Ohio–Indiana League	Jim McLeod
D	McAlester Rockets	Sooner State League	Vern Hoscheit
D	Fond du Lac Panthers	Wisconsin State League	Fred Collins

LEAGUE CHAMPIONS: Binghamton, Joplin, Independence
Manchester club folded, July 19, 1949
