= St. Joseph Cemetery =

St. Joseph Cemetery, St. Joseph's Catholic Cemetery or variants may refer to:

- Old St. Joseph's Cemetery (Cincinnati, Ohio)
- New St. Joseph Cemetery (Cincinnati, Ohio)
- St. Joseph Catholic Church (Camp Springs, Kentucky)
- St. Joseph Cemetery (Fleming, New York)
- St. Joseph Cemetery (Manchester, New Hampshire)
- St. Joseph's Catholic Church (Palm Bay, Florida)
- St. Joseph Cemetery (River Grove, Illinois)
- St. Joseph Cemetery (Swedesboro, New Jersey)
- St. Joseph Cemetery (West Roxbury, Massachusetts)
- St. Joseph's Cemetery, Cork (Ireland)
- Saint Joseph Cemetery (Lockbourne, Ohio)

== See also ==
- St. Joseph's Catholic Church (disambiguation)
