= William Bowers (disambiguation) =

William Bowers (1916–1987) was an American reporter and screenwriter

Bill, Billy, or William Bowers may also refer to:

- William W. Bowers (1834–1917), U.S. Representative from California
- Billy Bowers, vocalist with The Blind Boys of Alabama
- William Bowers (politician) (born 1952), American politician in South Carolina
- Billy Bowers (baseball) (1922–1996), American baseball outfielder
- Billy Bowers (actor)
- Bill Bowers (born 1959), American mime artist
- Julie Bowers (William Julius Bowers, 1926–1977), American baseball player

== See also ==
- William Bowers Bourn II (1857–1936), American entrepreneur
- William Bower (disambiguation)
