= Earl Rapp =

American baseball player (1921–1992)

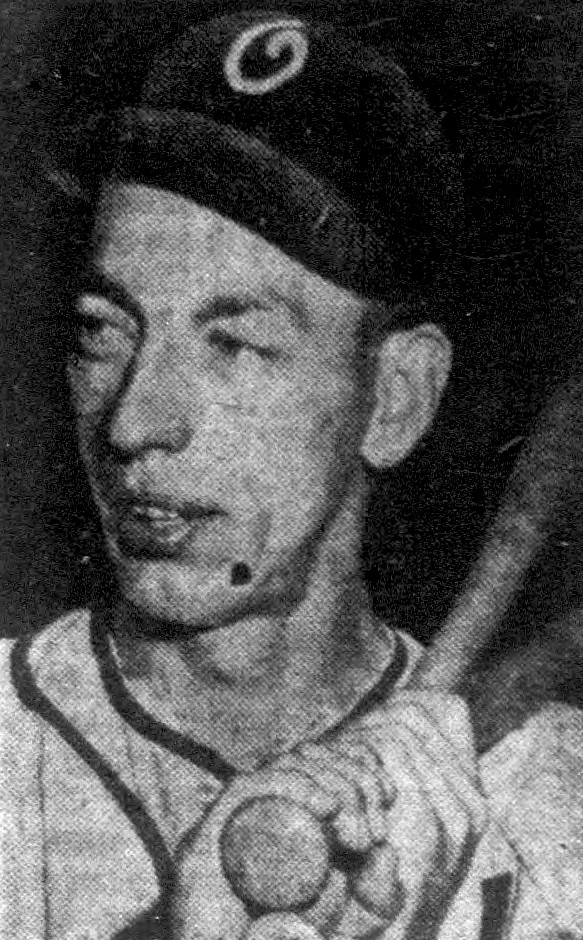
- Rapp, circa 1953
- Outfielder
- Born: May 20, 1921; Corunna, Michigan, U.S.
- Died: February 13, 1992 (aged 70); Swedesboro, New Jersey, U.S.
- Batted: Left Threw: Right

MLB debut
- April 28, 1949, for the Detroit Tigers

Last MLB appearance
- September 23, 1952, for the Washington Senators

MLB statistics
- Batting average: .262
- Home runs: 2
- Runs batted in: 39

Teams
- Detroit Tigers (1949); Chicago White Sox (1949); New York Giants (1951); St. Louis Browns (1951–1952); Washington Senators (1952)

Earl Wellington Rapp (May 20, 1921 – February 13, 1992) was an American professional baseball outfielder and scout. In Major League Baseball, he played in 1949 and from 1951 to 1952 for the Detroit Tigers, Chicago White Sox, New York Giants, St. Louis Browns and Washington Senators. Born in Corunna, Michigan, but raised in Swedesboro, New Jersey, he batted left-handed, threw right-handed, stood 6 feet 2 inches (1.88 m) tall and weighed 185 pounds (84 kg).

== Early life ==
Rapp, whose father was a plant inspector, went to Swedesboro High School in Swedesboro, New Jersey, where he lettered in baseball, basketball, football and track.

== Career ==
He was signed as a free agent by the Philadelphia Phillies in 1940. Before the 1941 season, he was sent to the Boston Red Sox in an unknown transaction. In June of that year, the Red Sox sent him to the Tigers in another unknown transaction. He then spent many years in the minor leagues, missing 1943 to 1945 due to military service. He served in the United States Army and saw combat in the European Theater of Operations, attaining the rank of Sergeant and earning a Silver Star and a Purple Heart. He was wounded in the leg at the battle of Colmar Pocket in early 1945.

In 1948, Rapp hit .298 with 17 home runs and 96 RBI for the Seattle Rainiers. Prior to getting the call up to the majors in 1949, he hit .340 with 15 home runs and 86 RBI for the Oakland Oaks.

On April 28, 1949, he made his major league debut. He had one plate appearance, drawing a walk. On May 7, 1949, he was traded to the White Sox for Don Kolloway. With the White Sox, he hit .259 in 19 games. He was sent to the Oakland Oaks on June 11 of that season to complete an earlier trade involving Jerry Scala and Catfish Metkovich. In 1950, he hit .347 with 24 home runs and 145 RBI for Oakland.

On July 1, 1951, Rapp was sent by the Oaks to the Giants for Spider Jorgensen and Red Hardy. He played in 13 games for the Giants, collecting 1 hit in 11 at-bats for a .091 batting average. He was selected off waivers by the Browns on September 1 of that year, and in 98 at-bats with them he hit .327 with two home runs and 15 RBI. Overall, he hit .303 in 109 at-bats that season. With the Oaks that year, he hit .322 with 10 homers and 74 RBI.

Despite having a solid run with the Browns in 1951, Rapp did not perform well for them in 1952. In fact, he hit only .143 in 49 at-bats, prompting them to trade him to the Senators for Fred Marsh on June 10. He wrapped up his career with the Senators, hitting .284 in 67 at-bats with them. Overall, he hit .224 with 13 RBI in 116 at-bats that season. He played his final game on September 23.

In 1953, Rapp hit .311 with 24 home runs and 108 RBI for the San Diego Padres of the Pacific Coast League. In 1954, he hit .337 with 24 homers and 111 RBI. In 1955, he hit .302 with 30 home runs and 133 RBI for them. In 1956, he hit .300 with nine home runs and 65 RBI. For the Padres and Portland Beavers in 1957, he hit .278 with three home runs and 19 RBI.

Overall, Rapp hit .262 in 279 big league at-bats. He hit two home runs and drove 39 runs in. He played for 12 different minor league clubs from 1940 to 1959, and in 12 years at Triple-A he hit .313.

== Later life ==
Rapp served as a scout from 1960 to 1989 for the Houston Colt .45s/Astros, Kansas City Royals, Montreal Expos and Cincinnati Reds. With Kansas City, he was responsible for the signing of Mark Gubicza. At the time of his death, he was a consultant to the Toronto Blue Jays.

Rapp died on February 13, 1992, in Swedesboro. Following his death, he was interred at St. Joseph Cemetery.
