= Don Wheeler =

American baseball player (1922–2003)

- Catcher
- Born: September 29, 1922; Minneapolis, Minnesota, U.S.
- Died: December 10, 2003 (aged 81); Bloomington, Minnesota, U.S.
- Batted: Right Threw: Right

MLB debut
- April 23, 1949, for the Chicago White Sox

Last MLB appearance
- October 2, 1949, for the Chicago White Sox

MLB statistics
- Batting average: .240
- Home runs: 1
- Runs batted in: 22
- Stats at Baseball Reference

Teams
- Chicago White Sox (1949)

Donald Wesley Wheeler (September 29, 1922 – December 10, 2003) was an American professional baseball player, a catcher who appeared in 67 games in Major League Baseball catcher for the Chicago White Sox in 1949. The native of Minneapolis threw and batted right-handed, stood 5 feet 10 inches (1.78 m) tall and weighed 175 pounds (79 kg) during his baseball career.

Wheeler, nicknamed "Scotty" due to his part-Scottish ancestry, graduated from South High School and signed with his hometown club, the Minneapolis Millers of the American Association, then an independently operated minor-league team, in 1941. After his first two professional seasons, in 1943 he joined the United States Army for World War II service; he saw combat in the European Theatre and was awarded the Bronze Star Medal.

Wheeler returned to baseball in 1946 as a member of the New York Giants' organization after the MLB club purchased the Millers franchise. The White Sox selected him in the 1948 Rule 5 draft, and in 1949 he was part of Chicago's three-man catching platoon, along with Joe Tipton and Eddie Malone. Wheeler led the trio with 54 starts behind the plate and 473 innings caught, just ahead of Tipton (49 starts, 441 innings) and Malone (48 starts, 4182/3 innings). Highlights included a four-hit, five-RBI day on July 30 against the eventual world champion New York Yankees, and his only big-league home run, struck June 12 off Ellis Kinder of the Boston Red Sox.

Wheeler returned to the minors in 1950 and effectively retired after the 1952 season, although he appeared in one game for the Millers at age 37 in 1960; he was serving as the club's part-time batting practice pitcher at the time. In his lone MLB season, Wheeler collected 46 total hits, with nine doubles and two triples accompanying his home run. He was credited with 22 runs batted in. He died at age 81 in Bloomington, Minnesota, on December 10, 2003.
