= Fenton Mole =

American baseball player (1925-2017)

- Mole with Phil Rizzuto in the dugout, 1949
- First baseman
- Born: June 14, 1925; San Leandro, California, U.S.
- Died: February 20, 2017 (aged 91); Danville, California, U.S.
- Batted: Left Threw: Left

MLB debut
- September 1, 1949, for the New York Yankees

Last MLB appearance
- September 30, 1949, for the New York Yankees

MLB statistics
- Batting average: .185
- Home runs: 0
- Runs batted in: 2
- Stats at Baseball Reference

Teams
- New York Yankees (1949)

Fenton Le Roy "Muscles" Mole (June 14, 1925 – February 20, 2017) was an American Major League Baseball player.

== Biography ==
Mole was born in San Leandro, California. He played two seasons for Newark in the minor leagues, 1947 and 1949. He was called up on September 1, 1949. Mole played in ten games for the New York Yankees in the 1949 season. He had five hits in 27 at-bats, with a .185 batting average. Mole batted and threw left-handed. In the field, he accepted 65 total chances (59 putouts, 6 assists) as a first baseman without an error for a 1.000 fielding percentage. He served in the U.S. Arm Air Forces during World War II.

He died on February 20, 2017, at the age of 91.
