= 1949 Boston Red Sox season =

Major League Baseball season

1949 Boston Red Sox
- League: American League
- Ballpark: Fenway Park
- City: Boston, Massachusetts
- Record: 96–58 (62,3%)
- League place: 2nd
- Owners: Tom Yawkey
- President: Tom Yawkey
- General managers: Joe Cronin
- Managers: Joe McCarthy
- Television: WBZ-TV/WNAC-TV (Jim Britt, Tom Hussey, Bump Hadley)
- Radio: WHDH (Jim Britt, Tom Hussey, Leo Egan)
- Stats: ESPN.com; Baseball Reference

The 1949 Boston Red Sox season was the 49th season in the franchise's Major League Baseball history. The Red Sox finished second in the American League (AL) with a record of 96 wins and 58 losses, one game behind the New York Yankees, who went on to win the 1949 World Series.

The Red Sox set a major-league record which still stands for the most base on balls by a team in a season, with 835. Center fielder Dom DiMaggio had a 34-game hitting streak, which still stands as the club record for the major-league Red Sox.

== Regular season ==
During the season, Mel Parnell was the last pitcher to win at least 25 games in one season for the Red Sox in the 20th century. George Kell beat Ted Williams for the American League batting title by 0.0002 percentage points.

Ted Williams set a major league record for the most consecutive games reaching base safely with 84. The streak began on July 1, and ended on September 28. The streak was ended by Washington Senators pitcher Ray Scarborough. Williams was in the on-deck circle when Johnny Pesky made the final out, depriving him of one more chance to extend the streak.

=== The trade that wasn't ===
In 1949, Boston Red Sox owner Tom Yawkey and Yankees GM Larry MacPhail verbally agreed to trade Joe DiMaggio for Williams, but MacPhail refused to include Yogi Berra.

=== Yankees and Red Sox toe-to-toe ===
Joe DiMaggio came back from heel surgery to demolish the Red Sox in a three-game series at Fenway Park. He hit four home runs, three of them game winners. It sent the Sox reeling, and they fell 12.5 games back by July 4. But Boston rallied after that, going 60-21 (.741) in their next 81 games, and they consequently went into Yankee Stadium for the final two games of the schedule with a one-game lead. The Red Sox needed just one win in two games and were to pitch Mel Parnell in the first game. After trailing 4–0, the Yankees came back to beat Parnell 5–4, as Johnny Lindell hit an eighth-inning, game-winning, home run and Joe Page had a great relief appearance for New York. And so it came down to the last game of the season. It was Ellis Kinder facing Vic Raschi.

The Yankees led 1–0 after seven innings, having scored in the first. In the eighth inning, Red Sox manager Joe McCarthy lifted Kinder for pinch hitter Tom Wright, who walked but was then erased on a double play. With Kinder out of the game, McCarthy then brought in Mel Parnell in relief, even though Parnell had pitched 4 innings the previous day (in which he had given up 8 hits, two walks and four runs). Parnell immediately yielded a homer to Tommy Henrich and a single to Yogi Berra, and after those two batters was quickly replaced by Tex Hughson, who had been on the disabled list and said his arm still hurt. But he came on and, with the bases loaded, Jerry Coleman hit a soft liner that Al Zarilla in right field tried to make a shoestring catch, but he missed and it went for a triple and three runs.

In the ninth inning the Red Sox rallied for three runs but still fell short. McCarthy was criticized for pinch-hitting for Kinder, particularly when there were no fully-rested, effective arms in the bullpen to replace Kinder on the mound. Hughson also claimed his manager ruined his career by making him pitch with a sore arm—Hughson, an eight-year Red Sox veteran, never again appeared in the major leagues after this game.

It was the second year in a row McCarthy's late-season managing was called into question. In 1948, McCarthy had chosen journeyman pitcher Denny Galehouse to start the tie breaker that decided who went to the 1948 World Series, and the Red Sox lost that tiebreaker to the Cleveland Indians.

=== Season standings ===
American League
Team	W	L	Pct.	GB	Home	Road
New York Yankees	97	57	.630	—	54‍–‍23	43‍–‍34
Boston Red Sox	96	58	.623	1	61‍–‍16	35‍–‍42
Cleveland Indians	89	65	.578	8	49‍–‍28	40‍–‍37
Detroit Tigers	87	67	.565	10	50‍–‍27	37‍–‍40
Philadelphia Athletics	81	73	.526	16	52‍–‍25	29‍–‍48
Chicago White Sox	63	91	.409	34	32‍–‍45	31‍–‍46
St. Louis Browns	53	101	.344	44	36‍–‍41	17‍–‍60
Washington Senators	50	104	.325	47	26‍–‍51	24‍–‍53

=== Record vs. opponents ===
1949 American League record Sources:
Team	BOS	CWS	CLE	DET	NYY	PHA	SLB	WSH
Boston	—	17–5	8–14	15–7–1	9–13	14–8	15–7	18–4
Chicago	5–17	—	7–15	8–14	7–15	6–16	15–7	15–7
Cleveland	14–8	15–7	—	13–9	10–12	9–13	15–7	13–9
Detroit	7–15–1	14–8	9–13	—	11–11	14–8	14–8	18–4
New York	13–9	15–7	12–10	11–11	—	14–8	17–5–1	15–7
Philadelphia	8–14	16–6	13–9	8–14	8–14	—	12–10	16–6
St. Louis	7–15	7–15	7–15	8–14	5–17–1	10–12	—	9–13
Washington	4–18	7–15	9–13	4–18	7–15	6–16	13–9	—

=== Opening Day lineup ===
7	Dom DiMaggio	CF
6	Johnny Pesky	3B
9	Ted Williams	LF
5	Vern Stephens	SS
1	Bobby Doerr	2B
23	Tommy O'Brien	RF
3	Walt Dropo	1B
8	Birdie Tebbetts	C
15	Joe Dobson	P

=== Notable transactions ===
- November 15, 1948: Wally Moses was released by the Red Sox.
- November 24, 1948: Ray Jablonski was drafted from the Red Sox by the St. Louis Cardinals in the 1948 minor league draft.

=== Roster ===
1949 Boston Red Sox
Roster
Pitchers: 15 Joe Dobson; 28 Harry Dorish; 33 Dave Ferriss; 25 Denny Galehouse; 19 Mickey Harris; 21 Tex Hughson; 12 Earl Johnson; 16 Ellis Kinder; 18 Jack Kramer; 20 Walt Masterson; 35 Windy McCall; 19 Mickey McDermott; 17 Mel Parnell; 26 Frank Quinn; 28 Jack Robinson; 22 Chuck Stobbs; 35 Johnnie Wittig	Catchers: 14 Matt Batts; 34 Babe Martin; 8 Birdie Tebbetts; Infielders: 24 Merl Combs; 1 Bobby Doerr; 3 Walt Dropo; 10 Billy Goodman; 11 Billy Hitchcock; 6 Johnny Pesky; 5 Vern Stephens; 27 Lou Stringer	Outfielders: 7 Dom DiMaggio; 4 Sam Mele; 23 Tommy O'Brien; 2 Stan Spence; 9 Ted Williams; 2 Al Zarilla; Other batters: 28 Tom Wright	Manager: -- Joe McCarthy; Coaches: 32 Earle Combs (First base); 30 Kiki Cuyler (Third base); 31 Paul Schreiber (Hitting); 29 Johnny Schulte (Bullpen)

== Player stats ==
=== Batting ===
==== Starters by position ====
Note: Pos = Position; G = Games played; AB = At bats; H = Hits; Avg. = Batting average; HR = Home runs; RBI = Runs batted in

Pos	Player	G	AB	H	Avg.	HR	RBI
C	Birdie Tebbetts	122	403	109	.270	5	48
1B	Billy Goodman	122	443	132	.298	0	56
2B	Bobby Doerr	139	541	167	.309	18	109
SS	Vern Stephens	155	610	177	.290	39	159
3B	Johnny Pesky	148	604	185	.306	2	69
OF	Al Zarilla	124	474	133	.281	9	71
OF	Ted Williams	155	566	194	.343	43	159
OF	Dom DiMaggio	145	605	186	.307	8	60

==== Other batters ====
Note: G = Games played; AB = At bats; H = Hits; Avg. = Batting average; HR = Home runs; RBI = Runs batted in

Player	G	AB	H	Avg.	HR	RBI
Matt Batts	60	157	38	.242	3	31
Billy Hitchcock	55	147	30	.204	0	9
Tommy O'Brien	49	125	28	.224	3	10
Sam Mele	18	46	9	.196	0	7
Lou Stringer	35	41	11	.268	1	6
Walt Dropo	11	41	6	.146	0	1
Merl Combs	14	24	5	.208	0	1
Stan Spence	7	20	3	.150	0	1
Tom Wright	5	4	1	.250	0	1
Babe Martin	2	2	0	.000	0	0

=== Pitching ===
==== Starting pitchers ====
Note: G = Games pitched; IP = Innings pitched; W = Wins; L = Losses; ERA = Earned run average; SO = Strikeouts

Player	G	IP	W	L	ERA	SO
Mel Parnell	39	295.1	25	7	2.77	122
Ellis Kinder	43	252.0	23	6	3.36	138
Joe Dobson	33	212.2	14	12	3.85	87
Chuck Stobbs	26	152.0	11	6	4.03	70
Jack Kramer	21	111.2	6	8	5.16	24
Mickey McDermott	12	80.0	5	4	4.05	50
Mickey Harris	7	37.2	2	3	5.02	14

==== Other pitchers ====
Note: G = Games pitched; IP = Innings pitched; W = Wins; L = Losses; ERA = Earned run average; SO = Strikeouts

Player	G	IP	W	L	ERA	SO
Walt Masterson	18	55.0	3	4	4.25	19
Earl Johnson	19	49.1	3	6	7.48	20

==== Relief pitchers ====
Note: G = Games pitched; W = Wins; L = Losses; SV = Saves; ERA = Earned run average; SO = Strikeouts

Player	G	W	L	SV	ERA	SO
Tex Hughson	29	4	2	3	5.33	35
Frank Quinn	8	0	0	0	2.86	4
Windy McCall	5	0	0	0	11.57	8
Harry Dorish	5	0	0	0	2.35	5
Dave Ferriss	4	0	0	0	4.05	1
Jack Robinson	3	0	0	0	2.25	1
Denny Galehouse	2	0	0	0	13.50	0
Johnnie Wittig	1	0	0	0	9.00	0

== Awards and honors ==
- Ted Williams, OF, American League MVP
- Ted Williams, American League leader, home runs (43) and runs batted in (159)
- Ted Williams, Major League record, Most consecutive games reached base safely (84).

== Farm system ==
Level	Team	League	Manager
AAA	Louisville Colonels	American Association	Fred Walters and Mike Ryba
AA	Birmingham Barons	Southern Association	Pinky Higgins
A	Scranton Red Sox	Eastern League	Mike Ryba and Jack Burns
B	Roanoke Red Sox	Piedmont League	Red Marion
C	San Jose Red Sox	California League	Marv Owen
C	Oneonta Red Sox	Canadian–American League	Eddie Popowski
D	Valley Rebels	Georgia–Alabama League	Jesse Danna, Malvern "Mal" Morgan and Woodrow "Woody" Bottoms
D	Marion Red Sox	Ohio–Indiana League	Wally Millies
D	Hornell Maple Leafs	PONY League	Marius Russo

LEAGUE CHAMPIONS: San Jose, Marion
