= William Bower =

William Bower may refer to:

- William H. Bower (1850–1910), lawyer and United States Representative in Congress
- William Bower (cricketer) (1857–1943), English first-class cricketer
- Bill Bower (1917–2011), American aviator, last surviving pilot of the Doolittle Raid

== See also ==
- William Bowers (disambiguation)
