= Jerry Scala =

American baseball player (1924–1993)

- Outfielder
- Born: September 27, 1924; Bayonne, New Jersey, U.S.
- Died: December 14, 1993 (aged 69); Fallston, Maryland, U.S.
- Batted: Left Threw: Right

MLB debut
- April 22, 1948, for the Chicago White Sox

Last MLB appearance
- September 26, 1950, for the Chicago White Sox

MLB statistics
- Batting average: .223
- Home runs: 1
- Runs batted in: 19
- Stats at Baseball Reference

Teams
- Chicago White Sox (1948–1950)

Gerald Michael Scala (September 27, 1924 – December 14, 1993) was an American Major League Baseball outfielder who played from 1948 to 1950 for the Chicago White Sox.

Originally signed by the New York Yankees in 1942, Scala was sent from the Yankees to the New York Giants in an unknown transaction before the 1946 season. Before the 1947 season, he was acquired by the Chicago White Sox.

After a successful minor league season in 1947 in which he led the Three-I League in both hits (163) and runs (116) while playing for the Waterloo White Hawks, he was on a fast track to the big leagues. On April 22, 1948, he made his big league debut. In three games for the White Sox that season, he collected no hits in six at-bats. He played in 37 games in 1949, hitting .250 with one home run and 13 RBI in 120 at-bats. On June 2 of that year, he was involved in an interesting trade between the minor league team the Oakland Oaks and the White Sox. Excerpted from Baseball-Reference.com: "Traded by the Chicago White Sox with a player to be named later and cash to the Oakland (PCL) for a player to be named later and Catfish Metkovich. The Oakland (PCL) sent Jerry Scala (June 11, 1949) to the Chicago White Sox to complete the trade. The Chicago White Sox sent Earl Rapp (June 11, 1949) to the Oakland (PCL) to complete the trade."

Scala played his final big league season in 1950. In 67 at-bats, he hit .194. His final game was September 26.

Overall, he hit .223 with one home run and 19 RBI in 80 big league games. In 193 at-bats, he had 26 runs, 43 hits, nine doubles and two triples. He also had three stolen bases, 27 walks and 32 strikeouts.

After he died, he was buried in Lorraine Park Cemetery in Baltimore, Maryland.
