= Jack Robinson (pitcher) =

American baseball player (1921–2000)

- Pitcher
- Born: February 20, 1921; Orange, New Jersey, U.S.
- Died: March 2, 2000 (aged 79); Ormond Beach, Florida, U.S.
- Batted: Right Threw: Right

MLB debut
- May 4, 1949, for the Boston Red Sox

Last MLB appearance
- May 11, 1949, for the Boston Red Sox

MLB statistics
- Win–loss record: 0–0
- Earned run average: 2.25
- Innings pitched: 4

Teams
- Boston Red Sox (1949)

John Edward Robinson (February 20, 1921 – March 2, 2000) was an American professional baseball player, a right-handed pitcher whose career lasted eleven seasons (1941–1942; 1946–1954), including three games played in the Major Leagues for the Boston Red Sox in 1949. He served in the United States Navy during World War II.

A native of Orange, New Jersey, he was raised in Bloomfield, New Jersey and graduated from Bloomfield High School in 1939 before attending Bordentown Military Institute. He stood 6 feet (1.8 m) tall and weighed 175 pounds (79 kg). He appeared in three games pitched, all in relief, during May for the 1949 Boston Red Sox. In those appearances, Robinson posted a 2.25 ERA in four full innings of work, giving up one run on four hits and one walk while striking out one. He did not have a decision or save.

Robinson died in Ormond Beach, Florida, at the age of 79.

== See also ==
- 1949 Boston Red Sox season
