= Fred Hancock =

American baseball player (1920–1986)

- Shortstop
- Born: March 28, 1920; Allenport, Pennsylvania, U.S.
- Died: March 12, 1986 (aged 65); Clearwater, Florida, U.S.
- Batted: Right Threw: Right

MLB debut
- April 26, 1949, for the Chicago White Sox

Last MLB appearance
- September 29, 1949, for the Chicago White Sox

MLB statistics
- Batting average: .135
- Home runs: 0
- Runs batted in: 9
- Stats at Baseball Reference

Teams
- Chicago White Sox (1949)

Fred James Hancock (March 28, 1920 – March 12, 1986) was an American shortstop in Major League Baseball. He played for the Chicago White Sox in 1949.
