= Pat Seerey =

American baseball player (1923–1986)

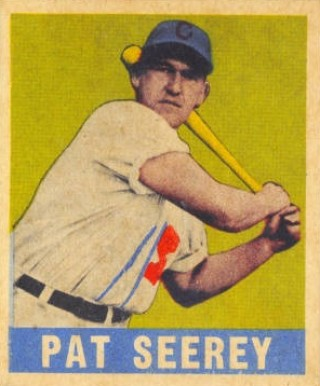
- Outfielder
- Born: March 17, 1923; Wilburton, Oklahoma, U.S.
- Died: April 28, 1986 (aged 63); Jennings, Missouri, U.S.
- Batted: Right Threw: Right

MLB debut
- June 9, 1943, for the Cleveland Indians

Last MLB appearance
- May 7, 1949, for the Chicago White Sox

MLB statistics
- Batting average: .224
- Home runs: 86
- Run batted in: 261
- Stats at Baseball Reference

Teams
- Cleveland Indians (1943–1948); Chicago White Sox (1948–1949)

Career highlights and awards
- Hit four home runs in one game on July 18, 1948

James Patrick Seerey (March 17, 1923 – April 28, 1986) was an American professional baseball player. An outfielder, Seerey played in Major League Baseball (MLB) for seven seasons in the American League with the Cleveland Indians and Chicago White Sox. In 561 career games, Seerey recorded a batting average of .224 and accumulated 86 home runs and 261 runs batted in (RBI).

Born in Oklahoma and raised in Arkansas, Seerey played football and baseball in high school. After graduating, he joined the Cleveland Indians' farm system in 1941, and made his major league debut two-and-a-half years later. He was primarily a starting outfielder the next five seasons for the Indians, but led the league in strikeouts four times. He was traded partway through the 1948 season to the Chicago White Sox, and a month after being traded became the fifth player in major league history to hit four home runs in one game. The following season, he was sent to the minor leagues, and played a few seasons in the farm system for the White Sox before retiring.

== Early life and minor leagues ==
Pat Seerey was born in Wilburton, Oklahoma, in 1923 to James and Marie Seerey. His family moved to Little Rock, Arkansas, when he was a child, and he played baseball for the Little Rock Boys' Club at Lamar Porter Field. He attended Little Rock Catholic High School, where he played baseball and American football, serving as the team's starting fullback. After graduating from high school in 1941, he was signed by the Cleveland Indians. Shortly afterwards, he was classified as 4-F, meaning he would not be lost to the military during World War II.

Seerey started his minor league baseball career in 1941 with the Appleton Papermakers of the Wisconsin State League. In one of his first appearances for the team, he hit for the cycle in a 15–4 victory against the Fond du Lac Panthers. In 104 games for Appleton that year, Seerey had a .330 batting average with 31 home runs and 117 runs batted in; the 31 home runs were a record for the Wisconsin State League at the time. The following season, Seerey played for the Cedar Rapids Raiders of the Three-I League. In 117 games for the Raiders, he had a .303 batting average and 33 home runs. In 1943, Seerey was promoted to the Wilkes-Barre Barons of the Eastern League, and played in 31 games over the first two months of the season. In early June, outfielder Hank Edwards broke his collarbone, and the Indians needed an extra outfielder on the roster; Seerey was promoted as a result.

== Cleveland Indians ==
Seerey made his debut with the Indians on June 9, 1943. Almost immediately after his debut, he earned the nickname of "people's choice" in media due to both his hitting ability and his "willingness to challenge the brick walls of the stadium". He played in 26 games for the Indians on the season, and hit .222 in 72 at-bats. Entering the 1944 Cleveland Indians season, manager Lou Boudreau planned to use Seerey as the starting center fielder, as he had reported to spring training 25 pounds lighter and Boudreau felt that Seerey could improve on a weak area on the team's roster. Seerey moved back to left field to begin the season; in his first game there on the year, he hit a three-run home run to give the Indians a 7–4 victory over the Detroit Tigers. A month into the season, Seerey was among the league leaders in runs batted in, which was attributed to better plate discipline, though his fielding in the outfield was still considered a liability. Partway through the season, Seerey's playing time diminished, yet he remained the team leader in home runs for most of the season despite limited at-bats. He finished the season with 15 home runs, 39 runs batted in, and a league-leading 99 strikeouts in 101 games.

Entering the 1945 Cleveland Indians season, Seerey was re-classified as 1-A, and took a military examination during the offseason. He was not slated to join the military after the exam, and the season started with him on the roster as one of the team's starting three outfielders, thanks in part to getting in shape after a strict diet during the offseason. He started off with hits in the first seven games of the season. A month into the season, Seerey hit his first two home runs of the season in a 7–3 loss to the New York Yankees. He followed that up in a mid-July game against the Yankees with three home runs and eight runs batted in, becoming the fourth Indians player to hit three home runs in a game in a 16–4 Indians win. He spent the second half of the season in and out of the starting lineup due to his inconsistent hitting; manager Boudreau felt that occasional rest days would increase his consistency. In a career-high 126 games, Seerey hit .236 with 14 home runs and 97 strikeouts, which again led the league.

After getting married in early 1946 to Jeanne Dillinger, Seerey started the 1946 Cleveland Indians season working with Boudreau to fix his hitting, as his lunge when he swung the bat was causing him to strike out too often and not hit enough home runs. The change worked, as by the start of July Seerey had a team-leading 11 home runs. His second-half performance included a doubleheader against the Chicago White Sox where he hit a home run in each game; the second home run landed in the upper deck of Cleveland Municipal Stadium, a feat that at the time had only been matched by fellow Indians outfielder Jeff Heath. He finished the season with a .225 batting average, 26 home runs, 62 RBIs, and 101 strikeouts. The 26 home runs were fourth in the league, and for the third straight year Seerey led the league in strikeouts.

Indians catcher Jim Hegan and Seerey spent the offseason improving their hitting, attending batting school led by Hall of Famer Rogers Hornsby; Hornsby concentrated primarily on improving Seerey's timing to help him to hit the ball more frequently. In spring training games, Seerey had nine home runs, and expectations were high for him; Boudreau gave him the starting job in left field for the opener against the White Sox. Through the first month of the season, Seerey had six home runs, but his performance worsened as the season went on. At the end of June, Seerey was removed from the starting lineup and replaced by both Dale Mitchell and Hank Edwards; he spent the rest of the season playing part-time. He finished the season with a .171 batting average and 11 home runs in 82 games.

After the 1947 season ended, Indians owner Bill Veeck put Seerey on a strict diet and exercise regimen for the offseason, stating that he had to lose 35 pounds if he wanted to remain on the team. By the start of spring training, he had reached his goal of 195 pounds, and felt like he had an easier time swinging the baseball bat as a result. After a good month of spring training, Boudreau named him the starter in right field for the 1948 season, saying that "he'll be in there until he stops hitting." Shortly afterwards, Seerey was removed from the starting lineup, and he ended up playing 10 games for the Indians before being traded. On June 2, Seerey was traded with Al Gettel to the White Sox for Bob Kennedy due to his inconsistency as well as an overstocked group of outfielders on the roster.

== Chicago White Sox and later life ==
Seerey was named the starting left fielder upon joining the White Sox, a position he held the rest of the season. Through his first 12 games, Seerey had 16 RBIs. On July 18, Seerey made history, becoming the fifth player to hit four home runs in one game, doing so in an 11-inning, 12–11 win over the Philadelphia Athletics. Seerey homered in three successive innings (fourth through sixth), hitting his first two off starting pitcher Carl Scheib and the third off reliever Bob Savage. His fourth home run, in the 11th off Lou Brissie, gave the White Sox the win. On that day, Seerey went 4-for-6 with seven runs batted in. In 105 games, 95 with the White Sox, Seerey had a .231 batting average, 19 home runs, 70 RBIs, and 102 strikeouts; he led the league in strikeouts for the fourth time.

The White Sox brought on new manager Jack Onslow to begin the 1949 Chicago White Sox season. He had a problem with Seerey, who arrived overweight to spring training, and did not consider him worthy of practicing with the other players until he got the weight back down. After playing in four games for the Sox, his last coming on May 7, Seerey was sent to the Los Angeles Angels of the Pacific Coast League, ending his major league career. He played for four minor league teams in 1949: Los Angeles, the Newark Bears, the Kansas City Blues, and the San Antonio Missions.

Seerey spent 1950 with the Colorado Springs Sky Sox of the Western League. Partway through the season, he broke the league's home run record of 30, and went on to hit 44 for the Sky Sox over the course of the season. He then finished the season with the Memphis Chickasaws, playing 136 total games with both teams. Seerey split most of the 1951 season between Memphis and Colorado Springs. In one game with the Sky Sox in June, Seerey had two grand slams and nine RBIs in a game, both league records at the time. He ended the season with the Tampa Smokers, and had 28 home runs in 113 between the three teams.

In 1952, Seerey joined a semi-professional baseball team in Guelph, Ontario. With them, he had 11 home runs and a .253 batting average, and retired at season's end. The 11 home runs were the highest in the league that season. After retiring, Seerey became a janitor in the St. Louis public school system. He died in Jennings, Missouri, from lung cancer on April 28, 1986, at the age of 63.

== See also ==
- List of Major League Baseball single-game home run leaders

Achievements
Preceded by Chuck Klein	Batters with 4 home runs in one game July 18, 1948	Succeeded by Gil Hodges
