= Les Willis =

American baseball player (1908–1982)

- Pitcher
- Born: January 17, 1908; Nacogdoches, Texas, U.S.
- Died: January 22, 1982 (aged 74); Jasper, Texas, U.S.
- Batted: Left Threw: Left

MLB debut
- April 28, 1947, for the Cleveland Indians

Last MLB appearance
- August 23, 1947, for the Cleveland Indians

MLB statistics
- Win–loss record: 0–2
- Earned run average: 3.48
- Innings pitched: 44
- Stats at Baseball Reference

Teams
- Cleveland Indians (1947)

Lester Evans Willis (January 17, 1908 – January 22, 1982) was an American professional baseball player, a left-handed pitcher who spent 12 seasons (1932–1942; 1946) in minor league baseball before seeing his only Major League service as a 39-year-old rookie for the 1947 Cleveland Indians. The native of Nacogdoches, Texas, stood 5 feet 9 inches (1.75 m) tall and weighed 195 pounds (88 kg).

Willis was selected by Cleveland in the 1946 Rule 5 draft after he won 18 of 25 decisions with a sparkling 2.37 earned run average for the Memphis Chickasaws of the Double-A Southern Association. He worked in 22 games for the 1947 Indians. His eleventh and twelfth appearances were his only starting assignments. On July 6, in the first game of a doubleheader, he worked six innings against the Chicago White Sox at Comiskey Park. He gave up eight hits and three runs, but only one was earned. Chicago prevailed 3–2 behind Eddie Lopat, with Willis taking the loss. Then, on July 12, in the second game of a twin bill, Willis lasted 4 2/3 innings in a home start against the Philadelphia Athletics and was not as effective, again surrendering eight hits but yielding four runs, all earned. Willis left the game tied 4–4, although his reliever, Ed Klieman, picked up the Cleveland win with 4 1/3 innings of scoreless pitching.

In his 22 MLB games, Willis would allow 58 hits and 24 bases on balls in 44 total innings pitched. He had ten total strikeouts, but collected no saves among his 20 relief appearances. In the minors, he won 142 games, and had three straight 20-victory seasons (1935–1937) in Class C ball.
