= Jack Bruner =

American baseball player (1924–2003)

- Pitcher
- Born: July 1, 1924; Waterloo, Iowa, U.S.
- Died: June 24, 2003 (aged 78); Lincoln, Nebraska, U.S.
- Batted: Left Threw: Left

MLB debut
- September 16, 1949, for the Chicago White Sox

Last MLB appearance
- October 1, 1950, for the St. Louis Browns

MLB statistics
- Win–loss record: 2–4
- Earned run average: 4.91
- Strikeouts: 28
- Stats at Baseball Reference

Teams
- Chicago White Sox (1949–1950); St. Louis Browns (1950)

Jack Raymond Bruner (July 1, 1924 – June 24, 2003) was an American professional baseball pitcher. He played two seasons in Major League Baseball.

Signed by the Chicago White Sox in 1949 as a bonus baby, he debuted in the major leagues three days after signing. In 1950, he was traded to the St. Louis Browns. After his two full seasons of time were complete, he was sent to the minor leagues, where he pitched for four more seasons, ending his career in 1954 with the Sioux City Soos.
