= Bill Evans (1940s pitcher) =

American baseball player (1919–1983)

- Pitcher
- Born: March 25, 1919; Quanah, Texas, U.S.
- Died: November 30, 1983 (aged 64); Grand Junction, Colorado, U.S.
- Batted: Right Threw: Right

MLB debut
- April 21, 1949, for the Chicago White Sox

Last MLB appearance
- June 21, 1951, for the Boston Red Sox

MLB statistics
- Win–loss record: 0–1
- Earned run average: 4.98
- Strikeouts: 4
- Stats at Baseball Reference

Teams
- Chicago White Sox (1949); Boston Red Sox (1951)

William Lawrence Evans (March 25, 1919 – November 30, 1983) was an American relief pitcher in Major League Baseball who played for the Chicago White Sox (1949) and Boston Red Sox (1951). Listed at 6 ft 2 in (1.88 m), 180 lb., Evans batted and threw right-handed. He was born in Quanah, Texas.

In a two-season Major League career, Evans posted a 0–1 record with a 4.36 ERA in 13 appearances, including five games finished, four strikeouts, 16 walks, and 21 2/3 innings pitched. In 12 seasons in minor league baseball, he worked in 386 games and compiled a 128–127 (.502) mark, retiring after the 1955 season.

Evans served in the US Army in World War II as an infantry man, eventually earning the Bronze Star Medal and Silver Stars.

Evans died in Grand Junction, Colorado, at age 64.
