= Frank Papish =

American baseball player (1917–1965)

- Pitcher
- Born: October 21, 1917; Pueblo, Colorado, U.S.
- Died: August 30, 1965 (aged 47); Pueblo, Colorado, U.S.
- Batted: Right Threw: Left

MLB debut
- May 8, 1945, for the Chicago White Sox

Last MLB appearance
- June 27, 1950, for the Pittsburgh Pirates

MLB statistics
- Win–loss record: 26–29
- Earned run average: 3.58
- Strikeouts: 255
- Stats at Baseball Reference

Teams
- Chicago White Sox (1945–1948); Cleveland Indians (1949); Pittsburgh Pirates (1950)

Frank Richard Papish (October 21, 1917 – August 30, 1965) was an American professional baseball pitcher who appeared in 149 games in Major League Baseball, 64 as a starting pitcher, over six seasons as a member of the Chicago White Sox (1945–48), Cleveland Indians (1949) and Pittsburgh Pirates (1950). The native and lifelong resident of Pueblo, Colorado, threw left-handed and was listed as 6 feet 2 inches (1.88 m) tall and 192 pounds (87 kg).

Papish entered pro baseball in 1936 after his graduated from Pueblo Central High School and toiled in the minor leagues for nine seasons until the White Sox gave him an opportunity in 1945, the final season of the World War II manpower shortage. As a 27-year-old MLB rookie, Papish pitched effectively in 19 games, 14 of them in relief, and tossed two complete games among his five starts. In 1946, with many players returning to the majors after their war service, Papish held onto his job with Chicago, with a 7–5 won–lost record and a nifty 2.74 earned run average in 31 games; among his 15 starts, he threw six complete games and two shutouts. Then, in 1947, he won a career-best 12 games, with an ERA of 3.26. His performance fell of in 1948, however; pitching for a White Sox team that lost 101 games and finished in last place, Papish won only two of ten decisions, and his ERA climbed to 5.00 in 951/3 innings pitched. He was traded to the defending World Series champion Cleveland Indians in December.

Papish spent only one campaign with the pitching-rich Indians, and his 1949 workload declined to 62 innings pitched, his lowest total yet in MLB, in 25 appearances. He made only three starts, but registered his 18th and final MLB complete game with an 8–1 thrashing of the Detroit Tigers on July 5 at Briggs Stadium. That off-season, Cleveland sold his contract to the Pittsburgh Pirates' organization, where, in 1950, Papish spent most of the year with Triple-A Indianapolis and was treated rudely in four June appearances that concluded his big-league career. All told, he posted a 26–29 career won–lost mark, three shutouts and nine saves, with a 3.58 earned run average. In his 149 career games and 581 innings pitched, Papish allowed 541 hits and 319 bases on balls, striking out 255.

After his professional career ended in 1953 in its 18th season, Papish was active in youth baseball in his home city, worked for a trucking firm, and was a deputy sheriff. He died in Pueblo in 1965, aged 47.
