= Jack Onslow =

American baseball player (1888–1960)

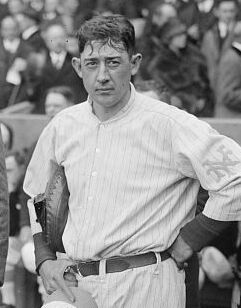
- Onslow with the New York Giants in 1917
- Catcher
- Born: October 13, 1888; Scottdale, Pennsylvania, U.S.
- Died: December 22, 1960 (aged 72); Concord, Massachusetts, U.S.
- Batted: Right Threw: Right

MLB debut
- May 2, 1912, for the Detroit Tigers

Last MLB appearance
- October 3, 1917, for the New York Giants

MLB statistics
- Batting average: .169
- Home runs: 0
- Runs batted in: 4
- Stats at Baseball Reference

Teams
- As player: Detroit Tigers (1912); New York Giants (1917); As manager: Chicago White Sox (1949–1950)

John James Onslow (October 13, 1888 – December 22, 1960) was an American player, manager, coach and scout in Major League Baseball. A catcher during his playing days, he spent a dozen years in the minor leagues, but only 36 games played in the majors. The native of Scottdale, Pennsylvania, threw and batted right-handed, stood 5 feet 11 inches (1.80 m) tall and weighed 180 pounds (82 kg).

== Baseball career ==
At age 60, Onslow became one of the oldest rookie managers in MLB annals when he was named skipper of the Chicago White Sox in the fall of 1948, succeeding Hall of Fame pitcher Ted Lyons. Onslow managed the South Siders for the entire 1949 season, finishing sixth in the American League with a 63–91 record. Compounding matters, he could not get along with his boss, Chisox general manager Frank Lane, and clashed with players and the Chicago press. He avoided being fired by Lane when vice president Chuck Comiskey, son of the White Sox' owner, Grace Comiskey, stepped in on Onslow's behalf at the close of 1949. But, after a poor start to 1950, when the White Sox dropped 22 of their first 30 contests, Onslow was replaced by one of his coaches, Red Corriden. His career record as a manager: 71 wins, 113 defeats (.386).

In Onslow's 36 games as a major league catcher for the 1912 Detroit Tigers and 1917 New York Giants, he batted only .169 with 13 total hits. But he would become a popular baseball figure as a longtime coach for a number of teams, including the Pittsburgh Pirates (1925–26), Washington Senators (1927), St. Louis Cardinals (1928), Philadelphia Phillies (1931–32) and Boston Red Sox (1934). In addition, he scouted for the White Sox and Boston Braves for several years and was holding a similar job with the Red Sox when he died, at 72, in Concord, Massachusetts, from a heart attack in 1960. To people around the game, Onslow was known as one of the most garrulous raconteurs of his day.

Onslow also managed minor league clubs for six seasons. His Memphis Chicks won 92 games in 1948, finishing second in the Southern Association, prompting his promotion to manager of the parent White Sox. Onslow's younger brother, Eddie, also played Major League Baseball and managed in the minor leagues.

== Managerial record ==
Team	Year	Regular season					Postseason			
Team	Year	Games	Won	Lost	Win %	Finish	Won	Lost	Win %	Result
CWS	1949	154	63	91	.409	6th in AL	–	–	–	–
CWS	1950	30	8	22	.267	fired	–	–	–	–
Total		184	71	113	.386		0	0	–	

== See also ==
- List of St. Louis Cardinals coaches

Preceded by Jack Ryan	Boston Red Sox Pitching Coach; 1934	Succeeded by Herb Pennock
