= Bill Higdon =

American baseball player (1924–1986)

- Outfielder
- Born: April 27, 1924; Camp Hill, Alabama
- Died: April 30, 1986 (aged 62); Pascagoula, Mississippi
- Batted: Left Threw: Right

MLB debut
- September 10, 1949, for the Chicago White Sox

Last MLB appearance
- October 2, 1949, for the Chicago White Sox

MLB statistics
- Batting average: .304
- Home runs: 0
- Runs batted in: 1
- Stats at Baseball Reference

Teams
- Chicago White Sox (1949)

William Travis Higdon (April 27, 1924 – April 30, 1986) was an outfielder in Major League Baseball who played in eleven games for the Chicago White Sox late in the 1949 season.
