= Eddie Malone (baseball) =

American baseball player (1920–2006)

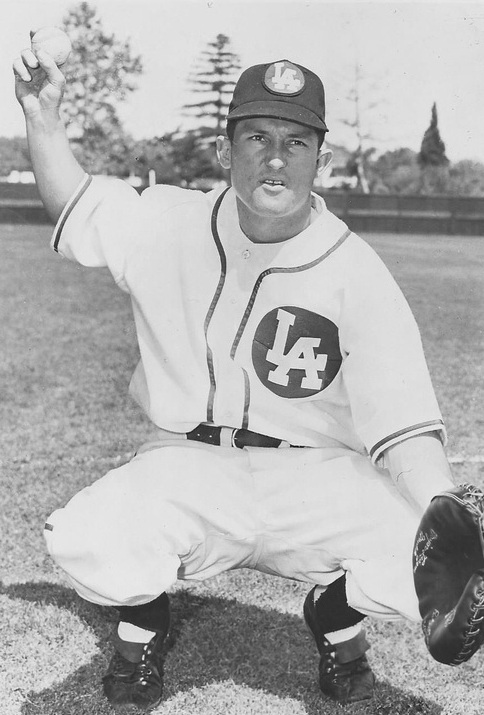
- Catcher
- Born: June 16, 1920; Chicago, Illinois, U.S.
- Died: June 1, 2006 (aged 85); Laguna Hills, California, U.S.
- Batted: Right Threw: Right

MLB debut
- July 17, 1949, for the Chicago White Sox

Last MLB appearance
- June 25, 1950, for the Chicago White Sox

MLB statistics
- Batting average: .257
- Home runs: 1
- Runs batted in: 26
- Stats at Baseball Reference

Teams
- Chicago White Sox (1949–1950)

Edward Russell Malone (June 16, 1920 – June 1, 2006) was an American professional baseball player. A catcher, he had a long career in minor league baseball (1938 through 1954, with the exception of the wartime 1945 campaign), interrupted by an 86-game Major League stint with the 1949–1950 Chicago White Sox. Malone was born in Chicago, Illinois, but grew up in Los Angeles, California; he threw and batted right-handed, stood 5 feet 10 inches (1.78 m) tall and weighed 175 pounds (79 kg).

Malone was purchased by White Sox from the crosstown Cubs' Los Angeles Angels farm team in the midseason of 1949. He started 48 games at catcher for the remainder of the season (alternating with Don Wheeler and Joe Tipton) and batted .271 in 170 at bats. The following year, Malone backed up starting receiver Phil Masi through late June, but on June 27 the White Sox acquired Gus Niarhos from the New York Yankees and sent Malone via the Yankees to the Oakland Oaks of the Pacific Coast League. He played the rest of the career in the PCL with Oakland and the Hollywood Stars.
