= Bob Mavis =

American baseball player, manager, and scout (1918–2005)

- Pinch runner
- Born: April 8, 1918; Milwaukee, Wisconsin, U.S.
- Died: March 1, 2005 (aged 86); Little Rock, Arkansas, U.S.
- Batted: Left Threw: Right

MLB debut
- September 17, 1949, for the Detroit Tigers

Last MLB appearance
- September 17, 1949, for the Detroit Tigers

MLB statistics
- Games played: 1
- Runs scored: 0
- Stats at Baseball Reference

Teams
- Detroit Tigers (1949)

Robert Henry Mavis (April 8, 1918 – March 1, 2005) was an American professional baseball player, manager and scout. Although he fashioned a long and successful playing career in minor league baseball as a second baseman and third baseman, his Major League career consisted of a single game. In the closing days of the 1949 season, on September 17, Mavis pinch-ran for Detroit Tigers catcher Bob Swift in the ninth inning of a game against the New York Yankees. He got as far as second base, but the game ended on a double play and he did not score a run. He was never called upon again that season, and in 1950 he resumed his minor-league career.

Bob Mavis was a 5 ft 7 in (1.70 m), 160 lb (73 kg) native of Milwaukee, Wisconsin, who batted left-handed and threw right-handed. His professional career began at the advanced age of 26 when he was signed by the Little Rock Travelers of the Class A1 (now Double-A) Southern Association in 1944, during the World War II manpower shortage. However, once the war ended and baseball was back at full strength, Mavis proved his mettle. He batted over .300 for his first six seasons as a pro in the high minors, with Little Rock and the Class AAA Toledo Mud Hens of the American Association. He was a 31-year-old MLB rookie when the parent Tigers summoned him from Toledo for the final weeks of the 1949 season. All told, in 12 minor league seasons, he batted .305 in 1,292 games played.

In 1954, Mavis became a manager in the Detroit farm system, then scouted for the club. In 1969 he switched allegiances to the Seattle Pilots as a scout, and continued in that role when the Pilots became the Milwaukee Brewers in 1970. He also spent 14 seasons as a scout for the Atlanta Braves, retiring after the 1990 season. Among the players he signed were Darrell Porter, Brett Butler and Craig McMurtry.

He died in Little Rock, Arkansas, at the age of 86.
