= Bob Kuzava =

American baseball player (1923–2017)

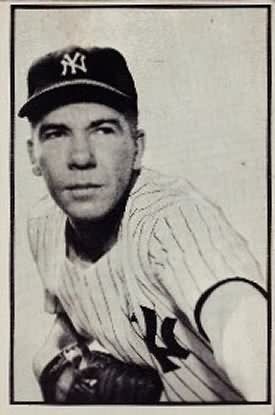
- Kuzava with the New York Yankees in 1953
- Pitcher
- Born: May 28, 1923; Wyandotte, Michigan, U.S.
- Died: May 15, 2017 (aged 93); Wyandotte, Michigan, U.S.
- Batted: Switch Threw: Left

MLB debut
- September 21, 1946, for the Cleveland Indians

Last MLB appearance
- September 29, 1957, for the St. Louis Cardinals

MLB statistics
- Win–loss record: 49–44
- Earned run average: 4.05
- Strikeouts: 446
- Stats at Baseball Reference

Teams
- Cleveland Indians (1946–1947); Chicago White Sox (1949–1950); Washington Senators (1950–1951); New York Yankees (1951–1954); Baltimore Orioles (1954–1955); Philadelphia Phillies (1955); Pittsburgh Pirates (1957); St. Louis Cardinals (1957)

Career highlights and awards
- 3× World Series champion (1951–1953)

Robert Leroy "Sarge" Kuzava (May 28, 1923 – May 15, 2017) was an American professional baseball player, a left-handed pitcher for the Cleveland Indians (1946–1947), Chicago White Sox (1949–1950), Washington Senators (1950–1951), New York Yankees (1951–1954), Baltimore Orioles (1954–1955), Philadelphia Phillies (1955), Pittsburgh Pirates (1957) and St. Louis Cardinals (1957). He was born in Wyandotte, Michigan and attended St. Patrick High School. In 2003, Kuzava was inducted into the National Polish-American Sports Hall of Fame.

== Career ==
Born and raised in the Detroit area, Kuzava made his Major League debut against the Detroit Tigers. He was the Indians' starting pitcher for a late-season 1946 game in Cleveland, and over eight innings he gave up just four hits and one earned run. He got no decision, the game lasting 11 innings, with Detroit's Dizzy Trout pitching all 11 for the victory. He spent most of the 1947 and 1948 seasons in the minor leagues before making it in the majors with the White Sox in 1949.

Kuzava, whose nickname was "Sarge" or "The White Rat," finished fourth in voting for the 1949 American League Rookie of the Year for having a 10–6 record for the Chicago White Sox, with nine complete games. He had served as a military policeman in India and Burma during World War II.

Kuzava helped the Yankees win three consecutive World Series from 1951–53. He gained saves in the final games of both the 1951 World Series against the New York Giants (Game 6) and 1952 against the Brooklyn Dodgers (Game 7). He pitched in the ninth inning of a 1953 World Series Game 5 victory for the Yankees as well.

Although his success in the World Series came in relief, Kuzava was a starting pitcher for the Yankees for three seasons, throwing 12 complete games. He joined them on June 15, 1951, with the Washington Senators trading him to New York for three players, and proceeded to earn three championship rings as a Yankee.

In a ten-season career, Kuzava had a 49–44 win–loss record, 13 saves, 446 strikeouts and a 4.05 earned run average (ERA).

== Death ==
Kuzava died on May 15, 2017, 13 days short of his 94th birthday.
