= Milt Nielsen =

American baseball player (1925–2005)

- Centerfielder
- Born: February 8, 1925; Tyler, Minnesota
- Died: August 1, 2005 (aged 80); Mankato, Minnesota
- Batted: Left Threw: Left

MLB debut
- September 27, 1949, for the Cleveland Indians

Last MLB appearance
- July 4, 1951, for the Cleveland Indians

MLB statistics
- Batting average: .067
- Hits: 1
- At bats: 15
- Runs: 2
- Stats at Baseball Reference

Teams
- Cleveland Indians (1949; 1951)

Milton Robert Nielsen (February 8, 1925 – August 1, 2005) was an American Major League Baseball center fielder who played for two seasons. He played for the Cleveland Indians in 1949 and 1951, appearing in 19 career games as an outfielder, pinch hitter and pinch runner. After retiring from baseball after the 1954 minor league he purchased a Chevrolet dealership in St. Peter, Minnesota. He is buried in Resurrection Cemetery in St. Peter.
