= Al Gettel =

American baseball player (1917–2005)

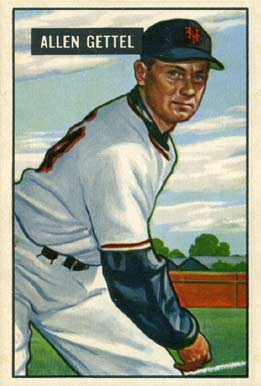
- Pitcher
- Born: September 17, 1917; Norfolk, Virginia, U.S.
- Died: April 8, 2005 (aged 87); Norfolk, Virginia, U.S.
- Batted: Right Threw: Right

MLB debut
- April 20, 1945, for the New York Yankees

Last MLB appearance
- September 12, 1955, for the St. Louis Cardinals

MLB statistics
- Win–loss record: 38–45
- Earned run average: 4.28
- Strikeouts: 310
- Stats at Baseball Reference

Teams
- New York Yankees (1945–1946); Cleveland Indians (1947–1948); Chicago White Sox (1948–1949); Washington Senators (1949); New York Giants (1951); St. Louis Cardinals (1955)

Allen Jones Gettel (September 17, 1917 – April 8, 2005), nicknamed "Two Gun", was an American professional baseball pitcher who played for the New York Yankees, Cleveland Indians, Chicago White Sox, Washington Senators, New York Giants, and St. Louis Cardinals of Major League Baseball. He also had a brief career as an actor in Westerns.

== Early life ==
Gettel was born on September 17, 1917, in Norfolk, Virginia, to Edward and Sarah Gettel. He lived on his family farm in Kempsville, Virginia. His father trained horses and he gained experience breaking them on the farm. Gettel graduated from Kempsville High School in Virginia Beach, Virginia.

== Baseball career ==
After he graduated from high school in 1936, Gettel signed as a free agent with the New York Yankees, and he pitched in the minor leagues for Yankees' farm teams. He made his professional debut with the Norfolk Tars of the Class B Piedmont League. In 1937, he pitched for the Butler Yankees of the Class D Pennsylvania State Association, where he pitched to a 7–5 win–loss record and a 3.99 earned run average (ERA) in 24 games pitched, and the Bassett Furnituremakers of the Class D Bi-State League, where he had 1–1 record and a 4.09 ERA in four appearances. Gettel pitched for the Snow Hill Billies of the Class D Coastal Plain League in 1938, and had a 16–7 record. In 1939, he pitched for the Augusta Tigers of the Class B South Atlantic League in 1939, and had a 14–8 record and a 3.46 ERA. He pitched for the Newark Bears of the Class AA International League in 1940 and 1941; he had a 3–3 record and a 3.43 ERA in 1940 and a 12–9 record and a 2.98 ERA in 1941. Pitching for the Kansas City Blues of the Class AA American Association in 1942, he had a 12–11 record and a 3.62 ERA.

On January 22, 1943, the Yankees traded Gettel and Ed Levy with $10,000 to the Philadelphia Phillies for Nick Etten. He indicated he would stay on his family farm during the 1943 season, as farming was a reserved occupation, while Levy was reclassified as 1-A by the Selective Service System, making him eligible for the draft. The Phillies requested that the Kenesaw Mountain Landis, the Commissioner of Baseball, void the trade. The dispute was settled on March 26, with Gettel and Levy returning to the Yankees, who sent Tom Padden and Al Gerheauser to the Phillies to complete the trade. Gettel played for Norfolk in the 1943 and 1944 seasons; he had a 11–11 win–loss record and a 1.38 ERA in 1943 and a 17–7 record and a 1.81 ERA in 1944.

Gettel made his major league debut with the Yankees in 1945. Gettel pitched for the Yankees in 1945 and 1946, and had a 15–15 win–loss record and a 3.84 ERA across both seasons. He allowed 11 home runs in 1945, which was the fifth-most in the American League. The Yankees traded Gettel to the Cleveland Indians with Hal Peck and Gene Bearden in exchange for Sherm Lollar and Ray Mack on December 6, 1946.

In 1947, Gettel established himself in the Indians' starting rotation, pitching to a 11–10 win–loss record and a 3.20 ERA. He began the 1948 season with a 0–1 record and a 17.61 ERA in five appearances. On June 2, 1948, Cleveland traded Gettel and Pat Seerey to the Chicago White Sox for Bob Kennedy. He had a 8–10 win–loss record and a 4.01 ERA for Chicago after the trade. Gettel struggled with the White Sox in 1949, pitching to a 2–5 record and a 6.43 ERA. On July 12, 1949, the Washington Senators purchased Gettel from the White Sox for the waiver price of $10,000. He had a 0–2 record and a 5.45 ERA for Washington. The Senators sold Gettel to the Oakland Oaks of the Pacific Coast League (PCL) in August 1949 to compensate the Oaks for their earlier purchase of Lloyd Hittle. Gettel had a 4–0 win–loss record and a 3.60 ERA in 12 games for Oakland, and re-signed with the Oaks for the 1950 season. He had a 23–7 win–loss record with a 3.62 ERA in 1950, and was named a PCL All-Star.

After the 1950 season, the Oaks traded Gettel, Ray Noble, and Artie Wilson to the New York Giants for Bill Ayers, Bert Haas, Joe Lafata, Wes Bailey, and $125,000. He had a 1–2 record and a 4.87 ERA in 29 relief appearances and one game started, before the Giants sold Gettel to Oakland on July 27, 1951. In 1953, he had a 24–14 record and a 3.20 ERA, setting a franchise record for wins. He also led the PCL in innings pitched for three consecutive seasons.

On August 20, 1955, the St. Louis Cardinals purchased Gettel from Oakland. He had a 1–0 record and a 9.00 ERA in eight appearances for St. Louis. Gettel played for the San Diego Padres of the PCL in 1956. He tried out for the Hollywood Stars of the PCL in 1957, but did not make the team. He pitched in five games for the Asheville Tourists of the South Atlantic League in 1959. Gettel retired from baseball with a 38–45 record and a 4.28 ERA in the major leagues.

== Acting career ==
While Gettel played for Oakland, he became involved in acting in Westerns after having a screen test with Paramount Pictures in 1953, which resulted in him receiving the nickname "Two Gun". He embraced the nickname, wearing cowboy outfits with two revolvers to the stadium. On "Al Gettel Day" in 1953, he rode from left field to home plate on a horse while wearing full Western wear. Gettel signed a contract with Gene Autry to develop films, and had a small role in the 1957 film The Tin Star.

== Later life ==
Gettel and his wife had three children. After his retirement from baseball, he continued to farm and became a construction equipment operator in Virginia Beach, Virginia. In 2001, Gettel and other players from the 1951 New York Giants admitted to stealing signs in their run to the postseason, with Gettel saying that "every hitter knew what was coming", and that it "made a big difference" for the Giants.

Gettel died in Norfolk on April 8, 2005.
