= Bill Bowers =

American actor

- Born: April 16, 1959 (age 67); Missoula, Montana, U.S.
- Education: Rocky Mountain College (BA); Rutgers University, New Brunswick (MFA)
- Years active: 2002-present

Bill Bowers (born April 16, 1959) is an American mime artist and actor based in New York City. As an actor, mime and educator, Bill has performed throughout the United States, Canada, Europe and Asia. He is a Movement for Actors Instructor at NYU Tisch School for the Arts and also teaches at the William Esper Studio and the Stella Adler Studio in NYC.

== Early life ==
Bill was born in Missoula, Montana and graduated from Montana's Rocky Mountain College with the Dean's Cup, President's Award, and was valedictorian. After graduation, he headed east to New Jersey where he continued his collegiate studies and earned an MFA from Rutgers University's prestigious Mason Gross School of the Arts.

In 2001 Bowers was awarded an Honorary Ph.D. from Rocky Mountain College, and was invited to give the Commencement speech in 2011. He has received numerous awards and accolades for his solo performances, and also named Artist of Eminence by the University of Wyoming in 2009. In 2011 Bill was awarded the Glidden Fellowship at Ohio University. Bill was named Artist in Residence at the All For One Theatre, and also at the Harold Clurman Center for New Works in Movement and Dance for 2015-16.

== Career ==
Bowers appeared on Broadway as Zazu in Disney's The Lion King, and Leggett in The Scarlet Pimpernel.

After studying with the legendary mime Marcel Marceau, Bowers became a mime full time.

Bill's autobiographical play It Goes Without Saying, opened Off Broadway in 2006 at the Rattlestick Playwrights Theater, and enjoyed a sold-out, extended run. Since that time It Goes Without Saying has been presented throughout the U.S., and has received numerous awards, including Best Production at the United Solo Festival, International Fresh Fruit Festival, and the Dallas/Fort Worth Critics Forum. In 2013, It Goes Without Saying received numerous five star reviews at the Edinburgh Festival Fringe in Edinburgh Scotland, and was rated an audience favorite in the festival. In 2014 Bill was awarded the Grand Prix at the International Thespis Festival in Kiel, Germany, one of the world's largest festivals. He continues to garner rave reviews and top honors at festivals in Estonia, Serbia, Macedonia, Norway, and Korea.

His solo work, Beyond Words, premiered in New York City in the Fall of 2011 at Urban Stages and is now being presented throughout the U.S. Beyond Words also received strong reviews and was named Best Solo Performance in the United Solo Festival and the Best Encore Performance in 2015, as well as the International Fresh Fruit Festival. In November 2013, the show finished a short run in New York City at the Cherry Lane Theatre. Beyond Words was also featured in the New Masculinities Festival in NYC.

In 2009 he premiered his ensemble play, Heyokah/Hokahey at the University of Wyoming in Laramie. Heyokah/Hokahey has also been produced in Colorado, Montana, and the Edinburgh Fringe Festivall in Scotland. Bill's original mime shows, Night Sweetheart, Night Buttercup and Under A Montana Moon, were produced Off Broadway and received critical raves. Under A Montana Moon has been performed all over the world, from Romania, to Macedonia, China, Japan and Norway. Bill has performed on the stages of Radio City Music Hall, Madison Square Garden, the Kennedy Center, and the White House.

Bill's solo play, All Over The Map, premiered Off Broadway in April 2016, produced by All For One Theatre. With director Scott Illingworth, he created an ensemble play inspired by the Dalton Trumbo novel, Johnny Got His Gun, developed with the support of the Harold Clurman Center for New Works in New York City. Johnny Got His Gun was also produced by the NYU Tisch Graduate School of Acting. With New York City Children's Theatre, Bill created "The Traveler," a silent play about immigration and asylum seekers in 2019. He is now developing a new solo play about Memory.

His regional theater credits include The Berkshire Theater Festival, The Denver Center Theater, Cincinnati Playhouse, George Street Playhouse, Montana Rep, Two Rivers Theater, Paper Mill Playhouse, and the Chester Theatre Company.

=== Other work ===
Bowers can be seen in the feature film, Two Weeks Notice, starring Sandra Bullock and Hugh Grant. His television credits include The Meredith Vieira Show, All My Children, One Life to Live, Remember WENN, Law & Order, and Disney's Out of The Box. While on Broadway, he was featured on The Rosie O'Donnell Show, The Today Show, and the Tony Awards. The PBS NewsHour featured a short documentary about Bill in 2017, as part of an ongoing series called Brief But Spectacular. Bill is featured in the Apple TV series, BEFORE, starring Billy Crystal, and in the upcoming feature film, LOST CAUSE. He has been awarded fellowships at The Hermitage Retreat, The Eugene O'Neill Foundation, Open AiR, the Gliddon Foundation, and was a featured artist in The Atelier at Princeton University.

== Personal life ==
Bowers is gay. He is married to costume designer and supervisor Michael Growler.
