= Grant Dunlap =

American baseball player (1923–2014)

- Outfielder
- Born: December 20, 1923; Stockton, California, U.S.
- Died: September 10, 2014 (aged 90); Vista, California, U.S.
- Batted: Right Threw: Right

MLB debut
- April 21, 1953, for the St. Louis Cardinals

Last MLB appearance
- July 28, 1953, for the St. Louis Cardinals

MLB statistics
- Batting average: .353
- Home runs: 1
- Runs batted in: 3
- Stats at Baseball Reference

Teams
- St. Louis Cardinals (1953)

Grant Lester Dunlap (December 20, 1923 – September 10, 2014) was an American baseball and basketball player and coach. An outfielder, he played professional baseball for 11 seasons, and appeared in 16 major league games for the St. Louis Cardinals in 1953. Two years later, he returned to his alma mater, Occidental College, and began a 30-year tenure that included service such as head baseball coach, men's basketball coach, physical education instructor, and athletic director.

== Early life and military service ==
Born in Stockton, California, and nicknamed "Snap", Dunlap's pro baseball career began in 1941 when he was signed at age 17 by the Cincinnati Reds. He threw and batted right-handed, stood 6 feet 2 inches (1.88 m) tall and weighed 180 pounds (82 kg). It would take Dunlap 12 years to reach the major leagues. After his second pro season, he served in the United States Marine Corps in the Pacific theatre of World War II. He enrolled at Occidental in the V-12 Navy College Training Program, played baseball for the Occidental Tigers in 1944, and gained his degree in 1946.

== Baseball career ==
He then resumed his baseball career in the Cleveland Indians' organization in 1947. Dunlap played for seven different teams for the next six years, but had a breakout season in 1952 as a member of the Shreveport Sports of the Double-A Texas League. He hit .333 to become the Texas League's batting champion and helped lead the Sports to the league's playoff championship. That off-season, his contract was purchased by the Cardinals.

In his brief major league career during the opening months of the 1953 season, Dunlap served primarily as a pinch hitter, garnering six hits in 17 at bats (.353), including a triple and a home run, the latter hit off Cincinnati's Ken Raffensberger on May 10, with three runs batted in. He did play four innings of one game as a right fielder on July 17, but had no chances in the field. His professional career ended after the 1955 minor-league season.

== Occidental College coach ==
At Occidental College, Dunlap was head baseball coach from 1955 to 1984, where he posted a won–lost record of 510–316 and won nine conference championships. In addition, he served as men's basketball coach for 16 years (with a record of 205–156), athletic director (1971–1976), and physical education instructor. He is a member of the Occidental College Hall of Fame. He also is a member of the Stockton Sports Hall of Fame for achievements in both baseball and basketball.

Dunlap died in Vista, California at the age of 90.
