= St. Joseph Cemetery (Swedesboro, New Jersey) =

Roman Catholic cemetery in Swedesboro, Gloucester County, New Jersey

- Interactive map of St. Joseph Cemetery

Details
- Established: ~1879
- Location: 140 Broad Street; Swedesboro, New Jersey
- Country: United States
- Coordinates: 39°45′58″N 75°18′22″W
- Owned by: Diocese of Camden
- No. of interments: >3,000
- Website: South Jersey Catholic Cemeteries
- Find a Grave: St. Joseph Cemetery

St. Joseph Cemetery is a cemetery located in Swedesboro, New Jersey, US. It was built by the now defunct St. Joseph Church (which was established in the 1860s).
