= Billy Bowers (baseball) =

American baseball player (1922–1996)

- Outfielder
- Born: March 25, 1922; Parkin, Arkansas, U.S.
- Died: September 17, 1996 (aged 74); Wynne, Arkansas, U.S.
- Batted: Left Threw: Right

MLB debut
- April 24, 1949, for the Chicago White Sox

Last MLB appearance
- June 9, 1949, for the Chicago White Sox

MLB statistics
- Batting average: .192
- Home runs: 0
- Runs batted in: 6
- Stats at Baseball Reference

Teams
- Chicago White Sox (1949)

Grover Bill Bowers (March 25, 1922 – September 17, 1996) was an American outfielder in Major League Baseball. He played for the Chicago White Sox in 1949.
