= Catfish Metkovich =

American baseball player (1920–1995)

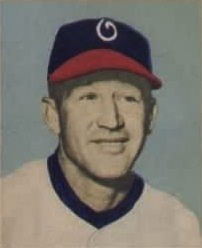
- Metkovich's 1949 Bowman Gum baseball card, during his tenure with the PCL Oakland Oaks
- Outfielder / First baseman
- Born: October 8, 1920; Angels Camp, California, U.S.
- Died: May 17, 1995 (aged 74); Costa Mesa, California, U.S.
- Batted: Left Threw: Left

MLB debut
- July 16, 1943, for the Boston Red Sox

Last MLB appearance
- September 26, 1954, for the Milwaukee Braves

MLB statistics
- Batting average: .261
- Home runs: 47
- Runs batted in: 373
- Stats at Baseball Reference

Teams
- Boston Red Sox (1943–1946); Cleveland Indians (1947); Chicago White Sox (1949); Pittsburgh Pirates (1951–1953); Chicago Cubs (1953); Milwaukee Braves (1954)

George Michael "Catfish" Metkovich (October 8, 1920 – May 17, 1995) was an American outfielder and first baseman in Major League Baseball for the Boston Red Sox (1943–46), Cleveland Indians (1947), Chicago White Sox (1949), Pittsburgh Pirates (1951–53), Chicago Cubs (1953) and Milwaukee Braves (1954). Born in Angels Camp, California, to Croatian parents, Metkovich earned his nickname when he stepped on a catfish during a fishing trip and cut his foot; the injury and ensuing infection caused him to miss several games.

Metkovich stood 6 ft 1 in (185 cm) tall, weighed 185 pounds (84 kg), and batted and threw left-handed. He helped the Red Sox win the 1946 American League pennant as the team's semi-regular right fielder. He appeared as a pinch hitter twice in the 1946 World Series against the St. Louis Cardinals. After flying out against Red Munger in Game 4, Metkovich's pinch double off Murry Dickson in the eighth inning of Game 7 helped the Red Sox come back from a 3–1 deficit. He scored the tying run on a double by Dom DiMaggio. But in the bottom of the same inning, the Cardinals broke the 3–3 tie on Enos Slaughter's "mad dash" to win the game and the world championship.

Metkovich's early career was spent in the American League, but his career peak came in the National League of the early 1950s. He finished 38th in voting for the 1952 National League Most Valuable Player, playing in 125 games and batting .271 with 101 hits, 7 home runs, and 41 RBIs. In his 10 MLB seasons he played in 1055 games, batting .261 with 934 hits, 47 home runs, and 373 RBIs.

Metkovich's playing career spanned 19 years (1939–57). He managed the San Diego Padres of the Pacific Coast League from May 16, 1957, through July 23, 1960, posting three winning records. He also briefly scouted for the expansion Washington Senators in the early 1960s.

Metkovich appeared in several Hollywood movies between 1949 and 1952. In "Three Little Words (1950)", he performed in several slapstick comedy scenes with Red Skelton.

He died in Costa Mesa, California, at the age of 74. In 2013, Metkovich was inducted posthumously in the Pacific Coast League Hall of Fame.

Sporting positions
Preceded by Bob Elliott	San Diego Padres (PCL) manager 1957–1960	Succeeded by Jimmie Reese
