= Ed Klieman =

American baseball player (1918–1979)

- Pitcher
- Born: March 21, 1918; Norwood, Ohio, U.S.
- Died: November 15, 1979 (aged 61); Homosassa, Florida, U.S.
- Batted: Right Threw: Right

MLB debut
- September 24, 1943, for the Cleveland Indians

Last MLB appearance
- June 2, 1950, for the Philadelphia Athletics

MLB statistics
- Win–loss record: 26–28
- Earned run average: 3.49
- Strikeouts: 130
- Stats at Baseball Reference

Teams
- Cleveland Indians (1943–1948); Washington Senators (1949); Chicago White Sox (1949); Philadelphia Athletics (1950)

Career highlights and awards
- World Series champion (1948)

Edward Frederick "Specs" Klieman (March 21, 1918 – November 15, 1979) was an American professional baseball pitcher. He played in Major League Baseball (MLB) in all or portions of eight seasons (1943–1950) for the Cleveland Indians, Washington Senators, Chicago White Sox and Philadelphia Athletics. For his career, he compiled a 26–28 won–lost record, with 33 saves, in 222 appearances, with a 3.49 earned run average and 130 strikeouts. Klieman was a relief pitcher on the 1948 World Series champion Indians, pitching in one World Series game, giving up three runs without recording an out.

Klieman was born in Norwood, Ohio. A right-hander, he was listed as 6 feet 1 inch (1.85 m) tall and 190 pounds (86 kg). His 15-season career began in 1937 in the organization of the Cincinnati Reds, but Klieman would spend the bulk of his career with Ohio's American League team, the Indians, working in 197 games (with 32 starts) during his first six MLB seasons. Klieman became a relief specialist starting in 1946. In 1947 he led the American League in games pitched (58) and saves (17). In 1948, he teamed with Russ Christopher to give AL champion Cleveland an effective bullpen duo; he worked in 44 games and put up his best ERA (2.60), while contributing four saves. Although he was treated roughly by the Boston Braves in Game 5 of the 1948 Series, his teammates came back the following day to win the sixth game and the world championship.

After the 1948 season, Klieman, Joe Haynes, and Eddie Robinson were sent to the Senators in exchange for Mickey Vernon and Early Wynn. He was ineffective, going only 10–21 with a 5.42 ERA in 112 games in his second stint with the Senators, which ended on October 7, 1952, when he was released. Klieman would appear in only two games for the Senators before his contract was sold to the White Sox in May 1949. He pitched effectively in relief for Chicago, winning his two decisions and posting a 3.00 ERA, but that December he was traded again, this time to the Philadelphia Athletics. However, Klieman was ineffective in five 1950 relief appearances and was sent to the minor leagues, where he finished his pro career in 1951.

In his 542 innings pitched as a big leaguer, Klieman allowed 525 hits and 239 bases on balls, to go with his 130 strikeouts. In 32 assignments as a starting pitcher, he threw ten complete games and two shutouts.

Ed Klieman died in Homosassa, Florida, at the age of 61 on November 15, 1979.

== See also ==
- List of Major League Baseball annual saves leaders
