= 1949 Major League Baseball season =

1949 MLB season
- League: American League (AL); National League (NL)
- Sport: Baseball
- Duration: Regular season: April 18 – October 2, 1949; World Series: October 5–9, 1949
- Games: 154
- Teams: 16 (8 per league)

Regular season
- Season MVP: AL: Ted Williams (BOS); NL: Jackie Robinson (BRO)
- AL champions: New York Yankees
- AL runners-up: Boston Red Sox
- NL champions: Brooklyn Dodgers
- NL runners-up: St. Louis Cardinals

World Series
- Champions: New York Yankees
- Runners-up: Brooklyn Dodgers
- Finals MVP: Joe Page (NYY)

MLB seasons
- ← 1948 1950 →

Locations of teams for the 1942–1953 American League seasons
American League
Locations of teams for the 1943–1952 National League seasons
National League

The 1949 major league baseball season began on April 18, 1949. The regular season ended on October 2, with the Brooklyn Dodgers and New York Yankees as the regular season champions of the National League and American League, respectively. The postseason began with Game 1 of the 46th World Series on October 5 and ended with Game 5 on October 9. In the third iteration of this Subway Series World Series matchup, the Yankees defeated the Dodgers, four games to one, capturing their 12th championship in franchise history, since their previous in 1947, and their first in a five-run World Series. Going into the season, the defending World Series champions were the Cleveland Indians from the 1948 season.

The 16th All-Star Game was held on July 12 at Ebbets Field in New York, New York, home of the Brooklyn Dodgers. The American League won, 11–7, for their fourth straight win.

With the Negro National League folding and the Negro American League losing their major-league status prior to the 1949 season, as per MLB's 2020 designation of Negro Leagues, the National and American Leagues remain as the sole major-leagues of baseball, a fact which continues to the present day.

On July 8, the New York Giants become the fourth team in professional baseball to break the color line when they fielded Hank Thompson (who previously integrated the St. Louis Browns, becoming the only player to integrate two teams) and Monte Irvin.

== Schedule ==
The 1949 schedule consisted of 154 games for all teams in the American League and National League, each of which had eight teams. Each team was scheduled to play 22 games against the other seven teams of their respective league. This continued the format put in place since the 1904 season (except for 1919) and would be used until 1961 in the American League and 1962 in the National League.

Opening Day took place on April 18, featuring four teams. The final day of the regular season was on October 2, which saw all sixteen teams play, continuing the trend from 1946. The World Series took place between October 5 and October 9.

== Rule changes ==
The 1949 season saw the following rule changes:

- Regarding the bonus rule, the amount of the bonus must now be made public before a contract was signed, including "such payments as are made to college men to help them with their education."
- Rules regarding night games were amended:
  - In addition to Sundays and holidays, night games were banned a day before a scheduled doubleheader, as well as on the night of a visiting team's departure for another city.
  - In the American League, the number of night games which did not require consent from the visiting team was increased from two to four.
  - In the National League, the number of night games which did not require consent from the visiting team was increased to five.

== Teams ==
League	Team	City	Ballpark	Capacity	Manager
American League	Boston Red Sox	Boston, Massachusetts	Fenway Park	35,200	Joe McCarthy
American League	Chicago White Sox	Chicago, Illinois	Comiskey Park	47,400	Jack Onslow
American League	Cleveland Indians	Cleveland, Ohio	Cleveland Stadium	78,811	Lou Boudreau
American League	Detroit Tigers	Detroit, Michigan	Briggs Stadium	58,000	Red Rolfe
American League	New York Yankees	New York, New York	Yankee Stadium	67,000	Casey Stengel
American League	Philadelphia Athletics	Philadelphia, Pennsylvania	Shibe Park	33,166	Connie Mack
American League	St. Louis Browns	St. Louis, Missouri	Sportsman's Park	34,000	Zack Taylor
American League	Washington Senators	Washington, D.C.	Griffith Stadium	29,731	Joe Kuhel
National League	Boston Braves	Boston, Massachusetts	Braves Field	37,106	Billy Southworth
National League	Boston Braves	Boston, Massachusetts	Braves Field	37,106	Johnny Cooney
National League	Brooklyn Dodgers	New York, New York	Ebbets Field	32,111	Burt Shotton
National League	Chicago Cubs	Chicago, Illinois	Wrigley Field	38,690	Charlie Grimm
National League	Chicago Cubs	Chicago, Illinois	Wrigley Field	38,690	Frankie Frisch
National League	Cincinnati Reds	Cincinnati, Ohio	Crosley Field	30,101	Bucky Walters
National League	Cincinnati Reds	Cincinnati, Ohio	Crosley Field	30,101	Luke Sewell
National League	New York Giants	New York, New York	Polo Grounds	54,500	Leo Durocher
National League	Philadelphia Phillies	Philadelphia, Pennsylvania	Shibe Park	33,166	Eddie Sawyer
National League	Pittsburgh Pirates	Pittsburgh, Pennsylvania	Forbes Field	33,730	Billy Meyer
National League	St. Louis Cardinals	St. Louis, Missouri	Sportsman's Park	34,000	Eddie Dyer

== Standings ==
=== American League ===
American League
Team	W	L	Pct.	GB	Home	Road
New York Yankees	97	57	.630	—	54‍–‍23	43‍–‍34
Boston Red Sox	96	58	.623	1	61‍–‍16	35‍–‍42
Cleveland Indians	89	65	.578	8	49‍–‍28	40‍–‍37
Detroit Tigers	87	67	.565	10	50‍–‍27	37‍–‍40
Philadelphia Athletics	81	73	.526	16	52‍–‍25	29‍–‍48
Chicago White Sox	63	91	.409	34	32‍–‍45	31‍–‍46
St. Louis Browns	53	101	.344	44	36‍–‍41	17‍–‍60
Washington Senators	50	104	.325	47	26‍–‍51	24‍–‍53

=== National League ===
National League
Team	W	L	Pct.	GB	Home	Road
Brooklyn Dodgers	97	57	.630	—	48‍–‍29	49‍–‍28
St. Louis Cardinals	96	58	.623	1	51‍–‍26	45‍–‍32
Philadelphia Phillies	81	73	.526	16	40‍–‍37	41‍–‍36
Boston Braves	75	79	.487	22	43‍–‍34	32‍–‍45
New York Giants	73	81	.474	24	43‍–‍34	30‍–‍47
Pittsburgh Pirates	71	83	.461	26	36‍–‍41	35‍–‍42
Cincinnati Reds	62	92	.403	35	35‍–‍42	27‍–‍50
Chicago Cubs	61	93	.396	36	33‍–‍44	28‍–‍49

=== Tie games ===
8 tie games (2 in AL, 6 in NL), which are not factored into winning percentage or games behind (and were often replayed again) occurred throughout the season.

==== American League ====
- Boston Red Sox, 1
- Detroit Tigers, 1
- New York Yankees, 1
- St. Louis Browns, 1

==== National League ====
- Boston Braves, 3
- Brooklyn Dodgers, 2
- Cincinnati Reds, 2
- New York Giants, 2
- St. Louis Cardinals, 3

== Postseason ==
The postseason began on October 5 and ended on October 9 with the New York Yankees defeating the Brooklyn Dodgers in the 1949 World Series in five games.

=== Bracket ===
World Series
AL	New York Yankees	4
NL	Brooklyn Dodgers	1

== Managerial changes ==
=== Off-season ===
Team	Former Manager	New Manager
Chicago White Sox	Ted Lyons	Jack Onslow
Detroit Tigers	Steve O'Neill	Red Rolfe
New York Yankees	Bucky Harris	Casey Stengel

=== In-season ===
Team	Former Manager	New Manager
Boston Braves	Billy Southworth	Johnny Cooney
Chicago Cubs	Charlie Grimm	Frankie Frisch
Cincinnati Reds	Bucky Walters	Luke Sewell

== League leaders ==
=== American League ===
Hitting leaders
Stat	Player	Total
AVG	George Kell (DET)	.343
OPS	Ted Williams (BOS)	1.141
HR	Ted Williams (BOS)	43
RBI	Vern Stephens (BOS); Ted Williams (BOS)	159
R	Ted Williams (BOS)	150
H	Dale Mitchell (CLE)	203
SB	Bob Dillinger (SLB)	20

Pitching leaders
Stat	Player	Total
W	Mel Parnell (BOS)	25
L	Paul Calvert (WSH); Ned Garver (SLB); Sid Hudson (WSH)	17
ERA	Mike Garcia (CLE)	2.36
K	Virgil Trucks (DET)	153
IP	Mel Parnell (BOS)	295.1
SV	Joe Page (NYY)	27
WHIP	Fred Hutchinson (DET)	1.161

=== National League ===
Hitting leaders
Stat	Player	Total
AVG	Jackie Robinson (BRO)	.342
OPS	Ralph Kiner (PIT)	1.089
HR	Ralph Kiner (PIT)	54
RBI	Ralph Kiner (PIT)	127
R	Jackie Robinson (BRO)	132
H	Stan Musial (STL)	207
SB	Jackie Robinson (BRO)	37

Pitching leaders
Stat	Player	Total
W	Warren Spahn (BSN)	21
L	Howie Fox (CIN)	19
ERA	Dave Koslo (NYG)	2.50
K	Warren Spahn (BSN)	151
IP	Warren Spahn (BSN)	302.1
SV	Ted Wilks (STL)	9
WHIP	Dave Koslo (NYG)	1.113

== Milestones ==
=== Batters ===
==== Cycles ====
- Wally Westlake (PIT):
  - Westlake hit for his second cycle and 15th in franchise history, on June 14 against the Boston Braves.
- Gil Hodges (BRO):
  - Hodges hit for his first cycle and seventh cycle in franchise history, on June 25 against the Pittsburgh Pirates.
- Stan Musial (STL):
  - Musial hit for his first cycle and 10th in franchise history, on July 24 against the Brooklyn Dodgers.

==== Other batting accomplishments ====
- Willie Jones (PHI):
  - On April 20, Jones ties Dick Bartell (1933) and Ernie Lombardi (1935) for most consecutive doubles in the National League at four.
- Elmer Valo (PHA):
  - On May 1, Valo becomes the first American League player to hit two bases-loaded triples in a game, against the Washington Senators.
- Del Ennis / Andy Seminick / Willie Jones / Schoolboy Rowe (PHI):
  - Become the second group of players in Major League history to hit five home runs in one inning in the eighth inning against the Cincinnati Reds on June 2. Andy Seminick hit two home runs in the set of five, hitting the second and fifth home run.
- Walker Cooper (CIN/NYG):
  - Became the sixth player to hit at least 10 runs batted in (RBI) in a single game as a part of the Cincinnati Reds, hitting 10 against the Chicago Cubs on July 6.
  - Ties a modern record with six hits in seven at-bats as a part of the Cincinnati Reds, including three home runs with 10 RBI, against the Chicago Cubs on July 6.
- Wally Moses (PHA):
  - Recorded his 2,000th career hit with a single in the fifth inning against the St. Louis Browns on July 26.
- Ralph Kiner (PIT):
  - On September 13, Kiner tied a major league record held by six players with his fourth grand slam of the season, against the Philadelphia Phillies.

=== Miscellaneous ===
- Philadelphia Phillies:
  - Tie a major league record for a team hitting the most home runs in a single inning, with five home runs in the eighth inning on June 2 against the Cincinnati Reds.
- Washington Senators:
  - Set a major league record for giving up most bases on balls in an inning, surrendering 11 in the third inning on September 11 against the New York Yankees.

== Awards and honors ==
=== Regular season ===
Baseball Writers' Association of America Awards
BBWAA Award	National League	American League
Rookie of the Year	Don Newcombe (BRO)	Roy Sievers (SLB)
Most Valuable Player	Jackie Robinson (BRO)	Ted Williams (BOS)
Babe Ruth Award (World Series MVP)	—	Joe Page (NYY)

=== Other awards ===
The Sporting News Awards
Award	National League	American League
Player of the Year	—	Ted Williams (BOS)
Pitcher of the Year	Howie Pollet (STL)	Ellis Kinder (BOS)
Rookie of the Year	Don Newcombe (BRO)	Roy Sievers (SLB)
Manager of the Year	—	Casey Stengel (NYY)
Executive of the Year	Bob Carpenter (PHI)	—

=== Baseball Hall of Fame ===
- Mordecai Brown
- Charlie Gehringer
- Kid Nichols

== Home field attendance ==
Team name	Wins	%±	Home attendance	%±	Per game
New York Yankees	97	3.2%	2,283,676	−3.8%	29,278
Cleveland Indians	89	−8.2%	2,233,771	−14.8%	29,010
Detroit Tigers	87	11.5%	1,821,204	4.5%	23,349
Brooklyn Dodgers	97	15.5%	1,633,747	16.8%	20,945
Boston Red Sox	96	0.0%	1,596,650	2.4%	20,736
Pittsburgh Pirates	71	−14.5%	1,449,435	−4.5%	18,824
St. Louis Cardinals	96	12.9%	1,430,676	28.7%	18,110
New York Giants	73	−6.4%	1,218,446	−16.5%	15,423
Chicago Cubs	61	−4.7%	1,143,139	−7.6%	14,846
Boston Braves	75	−17.6%	1,081,795	−25.7%	14,049
Chicago White Sox	63	23.5%	937,151	20.5%	12,171
Philadelphia Phillies	81	22.7%	819,698	6.8%	10,645
Philadelphia Athletics	81	−3.6%	816,514	−13.6%	10,604
Washington Senators	50	−10.7%	770,745	−3.1%	10,010
Cincinnati Reds	62	−3.1%	707,782	−14.0%	9,074
St. Louis Browns	53	−10.2%	270,936	−19.3%	3,519

== See also ==
- 1949 in baseball (Events, Movies, Births, Deaths)
- 1949 All-American Girls Professional Baseball League season
- 1949 Nippon Professional Baseball season
