= 1943 Philadelphia Athletics season =

1943 Philadelphia Athletics
- League: American League
- Ballpark: Shibe Park
- City: Philadelphia
- Record: 49–105 (.318)
- League place: 8th
- Owners: Connie Mack
- Managers: Connie Mack
- Radio: WIBG (By Saam, Roy Neal)

The 1943 Philadelphia Athletics season involved the A's finishing eighth in the American League with a record of 49 wins and 105 losses.

== Offseason ==
- November 2, 1942: Johnny Welaj was drafted by the Athletics from the Detroit Tigers in the 1942 rule 5 draft.

== Regular season ==
=== Season standings ===
American League
| Team | W | L | Pct. | GB | Home | Road |
|---|---|---|---|---|---|---|
| New York Yankees | 98 | 56 | .636 | — | 54‍–‍23 | 44‍–‍33 |
| Washington Senators | 84 | 69 | .549 | 13½ | 44‍–‍32 | 40‍–‍37 |
| Cleveland Indians | 82 | 71 | .536 | 15½ | 44‍–‍33 | 38‍–‍38 |
| Chicago White Sox | 82 | 72 | .532 | 16 | 40‍–‍36 | 42‍–‍36 |
| Detroit Tigers | 78 | 76 | .506 | 20 | 45‍–‍32 | 33‍–‍44 |
| St. Louis Browns | 72 | 80 | .474 | 25 | 44‍–‍33 | 28‍–‍47 |
| Boston Red Sox | 68 | 84 | .447 | 29 | 39‍–‍36 | 29‍–‍48 |
| Philadelphia Athletics | 49 | 105 | .318 | 49 | 27‍–‍51 | 22‍–‍54 |

=== Record vs. opponents ===
1943 American League record Sources:
| Team | BOS | CWS | CLE | DET | NYY | PHA | SLB | WSH |
|---|---|---|---|---|---|---|---|---|
| Boston | — | 8–14 | 12–10 | 11–11–1 | 5–17–1 | 11–11 | 11–9–1 | 10–12 |
| Chicago | 14–8 | — | 7–15 | 9–13 | 10–12 | 18–4–1 | 10–12 | 14–8 |
| Cleveland | 10–12 | 15–7 | — | 15–7 | 9–13 | 16–6 | 9–13 | 8–13 |
| Detroit | 11–11–1 | 13–9 | 7–15 | — | 10–12 | 13–9 | 11–11 | 13–9 |
| New York | 17–5–1 | 12–10 | 13–9 | 12–10 | — | 16–6 | 17–5 | 11–11 |
| Philadelphia | 11–11 | 4–18–1 | 6–16 | 9–13 | 6–16 | — | 8–14 | 5–17 |
| St. Louis | 9–11–1 | 12–10 | 13–9 | 11–11 | 5–17 | 14–8 | — | 8–14 |
| Washington | 12–10 | 8–14 | 13–8 | 9–13 | 11–11 | 17–5 | 14–8 | — |

=== Notable transactions ===
- April 14, 1943: Dave Odom was released by the Athletics.

=== Roster ===
1943 Philadelphia Athletics
Roster
| Pitchers: 23 Tal Abernathy; 18,23 Orie Arntzen; 20 Herman Besse; 23 Don Black; -- Charlie Bowles; -- Norm Brown; 28,31 John Burrows; 17 Russ Christopher; 7 Lou Ciola; 25 Tom Clyde; 24,25 Everett Fagan; 16,19 Jesse Flores; 18,22 Lum Harris; 14 Bert Kuczynski; 22,29 Sam Lowry; -- Jim Mains; -- Carl Scheib; 16,19 Roger Wolff | Catchers: -- Tony Parisse; 8 Bob Swift; 9 Hal Wagner; Infielders: -- Ed Busch; 6 Irv Hall; 22 Don Heffner; -- George Kell; 2 Eddie Mayo; -- Joe Rullo; 5 Dick Siebert; 10 Frank Skaff; 3 Pete Suder | Outfielders: -- Bill Burgo; 4 Bobby Estalella; -- Lew Flick; 7 Felix Mackiewicz; 12 Jimmy Ripple; -- George Staller; 12 Jim Tyack; 15 Elmer Valo; 11 Johnny Welaj; -- Woody Wheaton; 1 Jo-Jo White; Other batters: -- Vern Benson; 26 Earle Brucker; 14 Bruce Konopka | Manager: Connie Mack; Coaches: 28 Lena Blackburne; 26 Earle Brucker; 29 Dave Keefe; 27 Earle Mack |

== Player stats ==
| = Indicates team leader |

=== Batting ===
==== Starters by position ====
Note: Pos = Position; G = Games played; AB = At bats; H = Hits; Avg. = Batting average; HR = Home runs; RBI = Runs batted in

| Pos | Player | G | AB | H | Avg. | HR | RBI |
|---|---|---|---|---|---|---|---|
| C | Hal Wagner | 111 | 289 | 69 | .239 | 1 | 26 |
| 1B | Dick Siebert | 146 | 558 | 140 | .251 | 1 | 72 |
| 2B | Pete Suder | 131 | 475 | 105 | .221 | 3 | 41 |
| SS | Irv Hall | 151 | 544 | 139 | .256 | 0 | 54 |
| 3B | Eddie Mayo | 128 | 471 | 103 | .219 | 0 | 28 |
| OF | Jo-Jo White | 139 | 500 | 124 | .248 | 1 | 30 |
| OF | Bobby Estalella | 117 | 367 | 95 | .259 | 11 | 63 |
| OF | Johnny Welaj | 93 | 281 | 68 | .242 | 0 | 15 |

==== Other batters ====
Note: G = Games played; AB = At bats; H = Hits; Avg. = Batting average; HR = Home runs; RBI = Runs batted in

| Player | G | AB | H | Avg. | HR | RBI |
|---|---|---|---|---|---|---|
| Elmer Valo | 77 | 249 | 55 | .221 | 3 | 18 |
| Bob Swift | 77 | 224 | 43 | .192 | 1 | 11 |
| Don Heffner | 52 | 178 | 37 | .208 | 0 | 8 |
| Jim Tyack | 54 | 155 | 40 | .258 | 0 | 23 |
| Jimmy Ripple | 32 | 126 | 30 | .238 | 0 | 15 |
| George Staller | 21 | 85 | 23 | .271 | 3 | 12 |
| Bill Burgo | 17 | 70 | 26 | .371 | 1 | 9 |
| Frank Skaff | 32 | 64 | 18 | .281 | 1 | 8 |
| Joe Rullo | 16 | 55 | 16 | .291 | 0 | 6 |
| Woody Wheaton | 7 | 30 | 6 | .200 | 0 | 2 |
| Ed Busch | 4 | 17 | 5 | .294 | 0 | 0 |
| Tony Parisse | 6 | 17 | 3 | .176 | 0 | 1 |
| Felix Mackiewicz | 9 | 16 | 1 | .063 | 0 | 0 |
| Lew Flick | 1 | 5 | 3 | .600 | 0 | 0 |
| George Kell | 1 | 5 | 1 | .200 | 0 | 1 |
| Vern Benson | 2 | 2 | 0 | .000 | 0 | 0 |
| Bruce Konopka | 2 | 2 | 0 | .000 | 0 | 0 |
| Earle Brucker | 1 | 1 | 0 | .000 | 0 | 0 |

=== Pitching ===
==== Starting pitchers ====
Note: G = Games pitched; IP = Innings pitched; W = Wins; L = Losses; ERA = Earned run average; SO = Strikeouts

| Player | G | IP | W | L | ERA | SO |
|---|---|---|---|---|---|---|
| Jesse Flores | 31 | 231.1 | 12 | 14 | 3.11 | 113 |
| Lum Harris | 32 | 216.1 | 7 | 21 | 4.20 | 55 |
| Don Black | 33 | 208.0 | 6 | 16 | 4.20 | 65 |
| Charlie Bowles | 2 | 18.0 | 1 | 1 | 3.00 | 6 |
| Jim Mains | 1 | 8.0 | 0 | 1 | 5.63 | 4 |
| Norm Brown | 1 | 7.0 | 0 | 0 | 0.00 | 1 |

==== Other pitchers ====
Note: G = Games pitched; IP = Innings pitched; W = Wins; L = Losses; ERA = Earned run average; SO = Strikeouts

| Player | G | IP | W | L | ERA | SO |
|---|---|---|---|---|---|---|
| Roger Wolff | 41 | 221.0 | 10 | 15 | 3.54 | 91 |
| Orie Arntzen | 32 | 164.1 | 4 | 13 | 4.22 | 66 |
| Russ Christopher | 24 | 133.0 | 5 | 8 | 3.45 | 56 |
| Lou Ciola | 12 | 43.2 | 1 | 3 | 5.56 | 7 |
| Bert Kuczynski | 6 | 24.2 | 0 | 1 | 4.01 | 8 |
| Herman Besse | 5 | 16.1 | 1 | 1 | 3.31 | 3 |
| Tal Abernathy | 5 | 14.2 | 0 | 3 | 12.89 | 10 |
| John Burrows | 4 | 7.2 | 0 | 1 | 8.22 | 3 |

==== Relief pitchers ====
Note: G = Games pitched; W = Wins; L = Losses; SV = Saves; ERA = Earned run average; SO = Strikeouts

| Player | G | W | L | SV | ERA | SO |
|---|---|---|---|---|---|---|
| Everett Fagan | 18 | 2 | 6 | 3 | 6.27 | 9 |
| Carl Scheib | 6 | 0 | 1 | 0 | 4.34 | 3 |
| Sam Lowry | 5 | 0 | 0 | 0 | 5.00 | 4 |
| Tom Clyde | 4 | 0 | 0 | 0 | 9.00 | 0 |

== Farm system ==
| Level | Team | League | Manager |
|---|---|---|---|
| A | Elmira Pioneers | Eastern League | Ray Brubaker |
| B | Wilmington Blue Rocks | Interstate League | Dutch Dorman |

LEAGUE CHAMPIONS: Elmira
