= 1943 Washington Senators season =

1943 Washington Senators
- League: American League
- Ballpark: Griffith Stadium
- City: Washington, D.C.
- Record: 84–69 (.549)
- League place: 2nd
- Owners: Clark Griffith and George H. Richardson
- Managers: Ossie Bluege
- Radio: WOL (AM) (Arch McDonald, Russ Hodges)

The 1943 Washington Senators won 84 games, lost 69, and finished in second place in the American League. They were managed by Ossie Bluege and played home games at Griffith Stadium.

== Offseason ==
- January 29, 1943: Bill Zuber and cash were traded by the Senators to the New York Yankees for Milo Candini and Jerry Priddy.

== Regular season ==
=== Season standings ===
American League
Team	W	L	Pct.	GB	Home	Road
New York Yankees	98	56	.636	—	54‍–‍23	44‍–‍33
Washington Senators	84	69	.549	13½	44‍–‍32	40‍–‍37
Cleveland Indians	82	71	.536	15½	44‍–‍33	38‍–‍38
Chicago White Sox	82	72	.532	16	40‍–‍36	42‍–‍36
Detroit Tigers	78	76	.506	20	45‍–‍32	33‍–‍44
St. Louis Browns	72	80	.474	25	44‍–‍33	28‍–‍47
Boston Red Sox	68	84	.447	29	39‍–‍36	29‍–‍48
Philadelphia Athletics	49	105	.318	49	27‍–‍51	22‍–‍54

=== Record vs. opponents ===
1943 American League record Sources:
Team	BOS	CWS	CLE	DET	NYY	PHA	SLB	WSH
Boston	—	8–14	12–10	11–11–1	5–17–1	11–11	11–9–1	10–12
Chicago	14–8	—	7–15	9–13	10–12	18–4–1	10–12	14–8
Cleveland	10–12	15–7	—	15–7	9–13	16–6	9–13	8–13
Detroit	11–11–1	13–9	7–15	—	10–12	13–9	11–11	13–9
New York	17–5–1	12–10	13–9	12–10	—	16–6	17–5	11–11
Philadelphia	11–11	4–18–1	6–16	9–13	6–16	—	8–14	5–17
St. Louis	9–11–1	12–10	13–9	11–11	5–17	14–8	—	8–14
Washington	12–10	8–14	13–8	9–13	11–11	17–5	14–8	—

=== Roster ===
1943 Washington Senators
Roster
Pitchers: 17,7 Dewey Adkins; 20 Milo Candini; 29 Lew Carpenter; 18 Alex Carrasquel; 17 Vern Curtis; 31 Lefty Gomez; 19 Mickey Haefner; 12 Bill Lefebvre; 16 Dutch Leonard; 14 Jim Mertz; 17 Ox Miller; 00 Bobo Newsom; 10 Johnny Niggeling; 12 Ewald Pyle; 10 Ray Scarborough; 15 Owen Scheetz; 11 Early Wynn	Catchers: 8 Jake Early; 9 Tony Giuliani; 29 Tom Padden; Infielders: 36 Ed Butka; 3 Ellis Clary; 31 Harlond Clift; 15 Alex Kampouris; 28 George Myatt; 6 Jerry Priddy; 21,29 Red Roberts; 23 Sherry Robertson; 7 John Sullivan; 5 Mickey Vernon	Outfielders: 1 George Case; 4 Bob Johnson; 22 Red Marion; 24 Gene Moore; 34 Roberto Ortiz; 22 Jake Powell; 2 Stan Spence; Other batters: 21 Red Barbary	Manager: 25 Ossie Bluege; Coaches: 30 Nick Altrock; 27 Benny Bengough; 26 Clyde Milan

== Player stats ==
=== Batting ===
==== Starters by position ====
Note: Pos = Position; G = Games played; AB = At bats; H = Hits; Avg. = Batting average; HR = Home runs; RBI = Runs batted in

Pos	Player	G	AB	H	Avg.	HR	RBI
C	Jake Early	126	423	109	.258	5	60
1B	Mickey Vernon	145	553	148	.268	7	70
2B	Jerry Priddy	149	560	152	.271	4	62
SS	John Sullivan	134	456	95	.208	1	55
3B	Ellis Clary	73	254	65	.256	0	19
OF	Stan Spence	149	570	152	.267	12	88
OF	George Case	141	613	180	.294	1	52
OF	Bob Johnson	117	438	116	.265	7	63

==== Other batters ====
Note: G = Games played; AB = At bats; H = Hits; Avg. = Batting average; HR = Home runs; RBI = Runs batted in

Player	G	AB	H	Avg.	HR	RBI
Gene Moore	92	254	68	.268	2	39
Alex Kampouris	51	145	30	.207	2	13
Tony Giuliani	49	133	30	.226	0	20
Jake Powell	37	132	35	.265	0	20
Sherry Robertson	59	120	26	.217	3	14
George Myatt	42	53	13	.245	0	3
Harlond Clift	8	30	9	.300	0	4
Red Roberts	9	23	6	.261	1	3
Red Marion	14	17	3	.176	0	1
Ed Butka	3	9	3	.333	0	1
Roberto Ortiz	1	4	1	.250	0	0
Tom Padden	3	3	0	.000	0	0
Red Barbary	1	1	0	.000	0	0

=== Pitching ===
==== Starting pitchers ====
Note: G = Games pitched; IP = Innings pitched; W = Wins; L = Losses; ERA = Earned run average; SO = Strikeouts

Player	G	IP	W	L	ERA	SO
Early Wynn	37	256.2	18	12	2.91	89
Dutch Leonard	31	219.2	11	13	3.28	51
Milo Candini	28	166.0	11	7	2.49	67
Johnny Niggeling	6	51.0	4	2	0.88	24
Bobo Newsom	6	40.0	3	3	3.83	11
Lefty Gomez	1	4.2	0	1	5.79	0

==== Other pitchers ====
Note: G = Games pitched; IP = Innings pitched; W = Wins; L = Losses; ERA = Earned run average; SO = Strikeouts

Player	G	IP	W	L	ERA	SO
Mickey Haefner	36	165.1	11	5	2.29	65
Alex Carrasquel	39	144.1	11	7	3.68	48
Jim Mertz	33	116.2	5	7	4.63	53
Ray Scarborough	24	86.0	4	4	2.83	43
Ewald Pyle	18	72.2	4	8	4.09	25
Bill Lefebvre	6	32.1	2	0	4.45	10

==== Relief pitchers ====
Note: G = Games pitched; W = Wins; L = Losses; SV = Saves; ERA = Earned run average; SO = Strikeouts

Player	G	W	L	SV	ERA	SO
Dewey Adkins	7	0	0	0	2.61	1
Owen Scheetz	6	0	0	1	7.00	5
Lew Carpenter	4	0	0	0	0.00	1
Ox Miller	3	0	0	0	10.50	1
Vern Curtis	2	0	0	0	6.75	1

== Farm system ==
Level	Team	League	Manager
A1	Chattanooga Lookouts/ Montgomery Rebels	Southern Association	Marv Olson

Chattanooga franchise transferred and renamed, July 11, 1943
