= List of American League pennant winners =

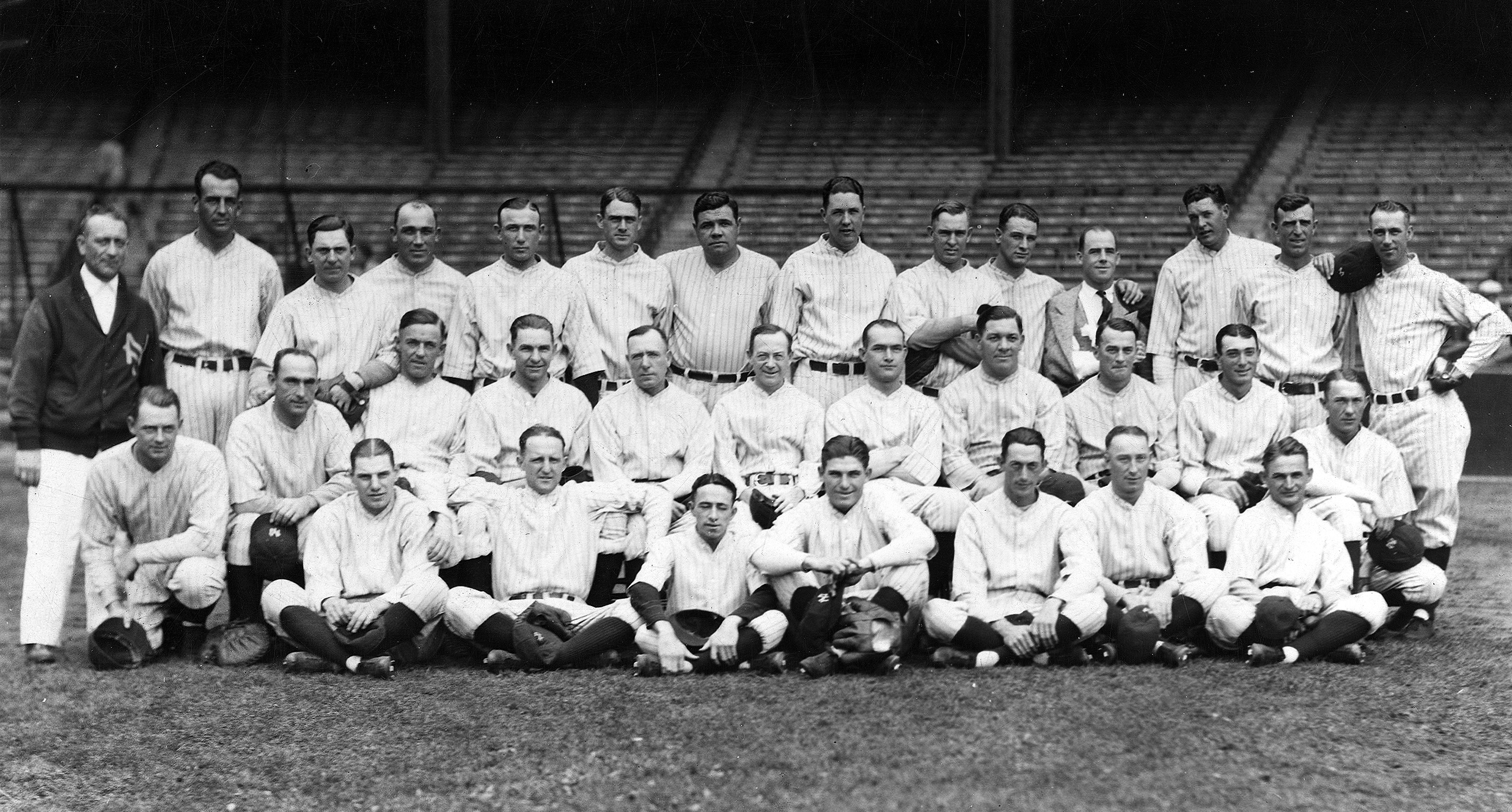
The 1926 New York Yankees were one of 41 pennant-winning teams in the Yankees' history.

Every Major League Baseball (MLB) season, one American League (AL) team wins the pennant, signifying that they are the league's champion and have the right to play in the World Series against the champion of the National League (NL). The pennant was presented to the team with the best win–loss record each year through the 1968 season, after which the AL Championship Series (ALCS) was introduced to decide the pennant winner. The first modern World Series was played in 1903 and, after a hiatus in 1904, has taken place every season except 1994, when a players' strike forced the cancellation of the postseason. The current AL pennant holders are the Tampa Bay Rays, who beat the Cleveland Guardians 4-2 for the pennant on October 19, 2026.

In 1969, the AL split into two divisions, and the teams with the best records in each division played one another in the five-game ALCS to determine the pennant winner, who received (and continues to receive) the William Harridge Trophy. The trophy featured a golden eagle, the league's emblem, sitting atop a silver baseball and clutching the AL banner. Since 2017, the trophy is all silver with a pennant on top. The trophy is named for Will Harridge, who was league president from 1931 to 1958. The format of the ALCS was changed from a best-of-five to a best-of-seven format in the 1985 postseason. In 1995, an additional playoff series was added when MLB restructured into three divisions in each league. An additional Wild Card Game was added in 2012. Beginning in 2022, three Wild Card teams and the division winner with the worst record play in the three-game Wild Card Series, with the winners facing the other two of the East, Central, and West Division winners in the AL Division Series, a best-of-five playoff to determine the opponents who will play in the ALCS. AL pennant winners have gone on to win the World Series 68 times, most recently in 2023.

The New York Yankees have won 41 AL pennants, winning their first in 1921 and their most recent in 2024. This total is more than twice that of the next-closest team, the Oakland Athletics, who have won 15. They are followed by the Boston Red Sox and the Detroit Tigers, with 14 and 11 pennants won respectively. The Yankees have the most pennants since the introduction of the ALCS in 1969 with 11, followed by the Athletics, Red Sox, and the Baltimore Orioles with 6, 6, and 5 respectively. The Yankees also hold the record for most wins by a pennant-winning team, with their 1998 team winning 114 out of 162 games, finishing 22 games ahead of the Boston Red Sox. The 1954 Cleveland Indians won the most games of any pennant winner under the pre-1969 system, winning 111 out of their 154 games and finishing eight games ahead of the Yankees. The Milwaukee Brewers won the AL pennant in 1982 but later moved to the NL starting in the 1998 season.

The only current MLB franchise to have never won a league pennant—and therefore, to have never appeared in the World Series—is the Seattle Mariners.

== Key ==
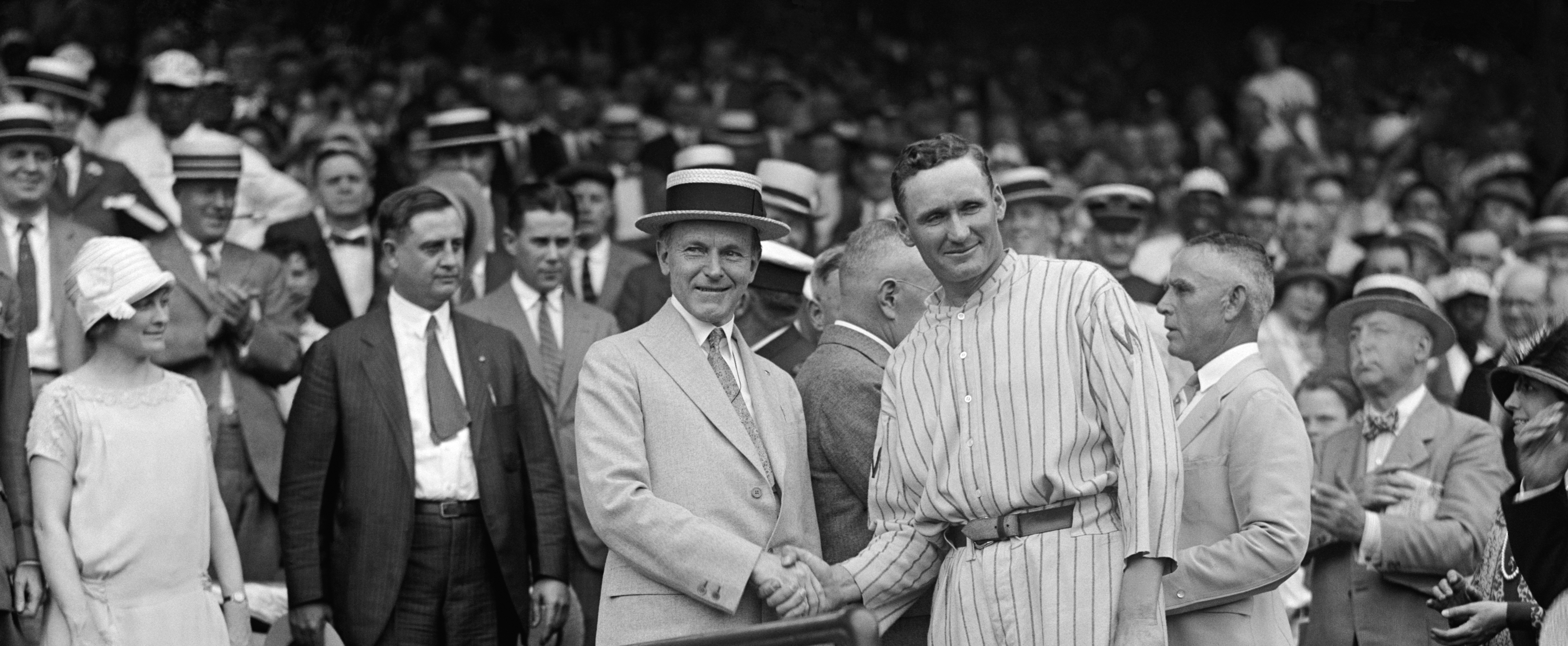
President Calvin Coolidge shakes hands with Washington Senators pitcher Walter Johnson celebrating the Senators' 1924 American League pennant, one of three won by the franchise while in Washington.

Year	Links to the corresponding "Major League Baseball season" article
Team	Links to the corresponding year in which the team played
Record	Regular season win–loss record
GA	Games ahead of the second-place team (1901–1968)
Ahead of	The second-place team (1901–1968)
Ref	Reference
	Won World Series (modern era only)
E	American League East division member (1969–present)
C	American League Central division member (1995–present)
W	American League West division member (1969–present)
†	Wild card team (1995–present)

== Single table era (1901–1968) ==
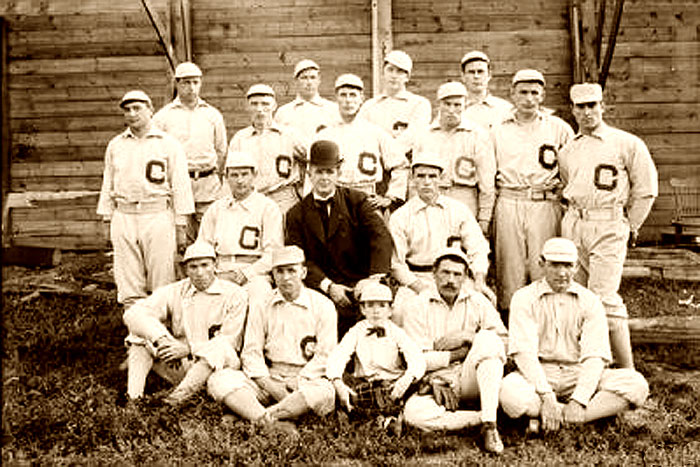
The Chicago White Stockings won the American League pennant in 1900 and 1901. The latter year was the AL's first season as a recognized "major league".

Year	Team	Manager	Record	GA	Ahead of	Manager	Ref
1901	Chicago White Sox	Clark Griffith	83–53	4	Boston Americans	Jimmy Collins	
1902	Philadelphia Athletics	Connie Mack	83–53	5	St. Louis Browns	Jimmy McAleer	
1903	Boston Americans	Jimmy Collins	91–47	14½	Philadelphia Athletics	Connie Mack	
1904	Boston Americans	Jimmy Collins	95–59	1½	New York Highlanders	Clark Griffith	
1905	Philadelphia Athletics	Connie Mack	92–56	2	Chicago White Sox	Fielder Jones	
1906	Chicago White Sox	Fielder Jones	93–58	3	New York Highlanders	Clark Griffith	
1907	Detroit Tigers	Hughie Jennings	92–58	1½	Philadelphia Athletics	Connie Mack	
1908	Detroit Tigers	Hughie Jennings	90–63	½	Cleveland Naps	Nap Lajoie	
1909	Detroit Tigers	Hughie Jennings	98–54	3½	Philadelphia Athletics	Connie Mack	
1910	Philadelphia Athletics	Connie Mack	102–48	14½	New York Highlanders	Hal Chase	
1911	Philadelphia Athletics	Connie Mack	101–50	13½	Detroit Tigers	Hughie Jennings	
1912	Boston Red Sox	Jake Stahl	105–47	14	Washington Senators	Clark Griffith	
1913	Philadelphia Athletics	Connie Mack	96–57	6½	Washington Senators	Clark Griffith	
1914	Philadelphia Athletics	Connie Mack	99–53	8½	Boston Red Sox	Bill Carrigan	
1915	Boston Red Sox	Bill Carrigan	101–50	2½	Detroit Tigers	Hughie Jennings	
1916	Boston Red Sox	Bill Carrigan	91–63	2	Chicago White Sox	Pants Rowland	
1917	Chicago White Sox	Pants Rowland	100–54	9	Boston Red Sox	Jack Barry	
1918	Boston Red Sox	Ed Barrow	75–51	2½	Cleveland Indians	Lee Fohl	
1919	Chicago White Sox	Kid Gleason	88–52	3½	Cleveland Indians	Tris Speaker	
1920	Cleveland Indians	Tris Speaker	98–56	2	Chicago White Sox	Kid Gleason	
1921	New York Yankees	Miller Huggins	98–55	4½	Cleveland Indians	Tris Speaker	
1922	New York Yankees	Miller Huggins	94–60	1	St. Louis Browns	Lee Fohl	
1923	New York Yankees	Miller Huggins	98–54	16	Detroit Tigers	Ty Cobb	
1924	Washington Senators	Bucky Harris	92–62	2	New York Yankees	Miller Huggins	
1925	Washington Senators	Bucky Harris	96–55	8½	Philadelphia Athletics	Connie Mack	
1926	New York Yankees	Miller Huggins	91–63	3	Cleveland Indians	Tris Speaker	
1927	New York Yankees	Miller Huggins	110–44	19	Philadelphia Athletics	Connie Mack	
1928	New York Yankees	Miller Huggins	101–53	2½	Philadelphia Athletics	Connie Mack	
1929	Philadelphia Athletics	Connie Mack	104–46	18	New York Yankees	Miller Huggins	
1930	Philadelphia Athletics	Connie Mack	102–52	8	Washington Senators	Walter Johnson	
1931	Philadelphia Athletics	Connie Mack	107–45	13½	New York Yankees	Joe McCarthy	
1932	New York Yankees	Joe McCarthy	107–47	13	Philadelphia Athletics	Connie Mack	
1933	Washington Senators	Joe Cronin	99–53	7	New York Yankees	Joe McCarthy	
1934	Detroit Tigers	Mickey Cochrane	101–53	7	New York Yankees	Joe McCarthy	
1935	Detroit Tigers	Mickey Cochrane	93–58	3	New York Yankees	Joe McCarthy	
1936	New York Yankees	Joe McCarthy	102–51	19½	Detroit Tigers	Mickey Cochrane	
1937	New York Yankees	Joe McCarthy	102–52	13	Detroit Tigers	Mickey Cochrane	
1938	New York Yankees	Joe McCarthy	99–53	9½	Boston Red Sox	Joe Cronin	
1939	New York Yankees	Joe McCarthy	106–45	17	Boston Red Sox	Joe Cronin	
1940	Detroit Tigers	Del Baker	90–53	1	Cleveland Indians	Del Baker	
1941	New York Yankees	Joe McCarthy	101–53	17	Boston Red Sox	Joe Cronin	
1942	New York Yankees	Joe McCarthy	103–51	9	Boston Red Sox	Joe Cronin	
1943	New York Yankees	Joe McCarthy	98–49	13½	Washington Senators	Ossie Bluege	
1944	St. Louis Browns	Luke Sewell	89–65	1	Detroit Tigers	Steve O'Neill	
1945	Detroit Tigers	Steve O'Neill	88–65	1½	Washington Senators	Ossie Bluege	
1946	Boston Red Sox	Joe Cronin	104–50	12	Detroit Tigers	Steve O'Neill	
1947	New York Yankees	Bucky Harris	97–57	12	Detroit Tigers	Steve O'Neill	
1948	Cleveland Indians	Lou Boudreau	97–58	1	Boston Red Sox	Joe McCarthy	
1949	New York Yankees	Casey Stengel	97–57	1	Boston Red Sox	Joe McCarthy	
1950	New York Yankees	Casey Stengel	98–56	3	Detroit Tigers	Red Rolfe	
1951	New York Yankees	Casey Stengel	98–56	5	Cleveland Indians	Al López	
1952	New York Yankees	Casey Stengel	95–59	2	Cleveland Indians	Al López	
1953	New York Yankees	Casey Stengel	99–52	8½	Cleveland Indians	Al López	
1954	Cleveland Indians	Al López	111–43	8	New York Yankees	Casey Stengel	
1955	New York Yankees	Casey Stengel	96–58	3	Cleveland Indians	Al López	
1956	New York Yankees	Casey Stengel	97–57	9	Cleveland Indians	Al López	
1957	New York Yankees	Casey Stengel	98–56	8	Chicago White Sox	Al López	
1958	New York Yankees	Casey Stengel	92–62	10	Chicago White Sox	Al López	
1959	Chicago White Sox	Al López	94–60	5	Cleveland Indians	Joe Gordon	
1960	New York Yankees	Casey Stengel	97–57	8	Baltimore Orioles	Paul Richards	
1961	New York Yankees	Ralph Houk	109–53	8	Detroit Tigers	Bob Scheffing	
1962	New York Yankees	Ralph Houk	96–62	5	Minnesota Twins	Sam Mele	
1963	New York Yankees	Ralph Houk	104–57	10½	Chicago White Sox	Al López	
1964	New York Yankees	Yogi Berra	99–63	1	Chicago White Sox	Al López	
1965	Minnesota Twins	Sam Mele	102–60	7	Chicago White Sox	Al López	
1966	Baltimore Orioles	Hank Bauer	97–63	9	Minnesota Twins	Sam Mele	
1967	Boston Red Sox	Dick Williams	92–70	1	Detroit Tigers	Mayo Smith	
1968	Detroit Tigers	Mayo Smith	103–59	12	Baltimore Orioles	Earl Weaver	

== League Championship Series era (1969–present) ==
Year	Series	Winning team	Manager	Record	Games	Losing team	Manager	Record	Ref
1969	1969	Baltimore Orioles^{E}	Earl Weaver	109–53	3–0	Minnesota Twins^{W}	Billy Martin	97–65	
1970	1970	Baltimore Orioles^{E}	Earl Weaver	108–54	3–0	Minnesota Twins^{W}	Bill Rigney	98–64	
1971	1971	Baltimore Orioles^{E}	Earl Weaver	101–57	3–0	Oakland Athletics^{W}	Dick Williams	101–60	
1972	1972	Oakland Athletics^{W}	Dick Williams	93–62	3–2	Detroit Tigers^{E}	Billy Martin	86–70	
1973	1973	Oakland Athletics^{W}	Dick Williams	94–68	3–2	Baltimore Orioles^{E}	Earl Weaver	97–65	
1974	1974	Oakland Athletics^{W}	Alvin Dark	90–72	3–1	Baltimore Orioles^{E}	Earl Weaver	91–71	
1975	1975	Boston Red Sox^{E}	Darrell Johnson	95–65	3–0	Oakland Athletics^{W}	Alvin Dark	98–64	
1976	1976	New York Yankees^{E}	Billy Martin	97–62	3–2	Kansas City Royals^{W}	Whitey Herzog	90–72	
1977	1977	New York Yankees^{E}	Billy Martin	100–62	3–2	Kansas City Royals^{W}	Whitey Herzog	102–60	
1978	1978	New York Yankees^{E}	Bob Lemon	100–63	3–1	Kansas City Royals^{W}	Whitey Herzog	92–70	
1979	1979	Baltimore Orioles^{E}	Earl Weaver	102–57	3–1	California Angels^{W}	Jim Fregosi	88–74	
1980	1980	Kansas City Royals^{W}	Jim Frey	97–65	3–0	New York Yankees^{E}	Dick Howser	103–59	
1981^{[a]}	1981	New York Yankees^{E}	Bob Lemon	59–48	3–0	Oakland Athletics^{W}	Billy Martin	64–45	
1982	1982	Milwaukee Brewers^{E}	Harvey Kuenn	95–67	3–2	California Angels^{W}	Gene Mauch	93–69	
1983	1983	Baltimore Orioles^{E}	Joe Altobelli	98–64	3–1	Chicago White Sox^{W}	Tony La Russa	99–63	
1984	1984	Detroit Tigers^{E}	Sparky Anderson	104–58	3–0	Kansas City Royals^{W}	Dick Howser	84–78	
1985	1985	Kansas City Royals^{W}	Dick Howser	91–71	4–3	Toronto Blue Jays^{E}	Bobby Cox	99–62	
1986	1986	Boston Red Sox^{E}	John McNamara	95–66	4–3	California Angels^{W}	Gene Mauch	92–70	
1987	1987	Minnesota Twins^{W}	Tom Kelly	85–77	4–1	Detroit Tigers^{E}	Sparky Anderson	98–64	
1988	1988	Oakland Athletics^{W}	Tony La Russa	104–58	4–0	Boston Red Sox^{E}	Joe Morgan	89–73	
1989	1989	Oakland Athletics^{W}	Tony La Russa	99–63	4–1	Toronto Blue Jays^{E}	Cito Gaston	89–73	
1990	1990	Oakland Athletics^{W}	Tony La Russa	103–59	4–0	Boston Red Sox^{E}	Joe Morgan	88–74	
1991	1991	Minnesota Twins^{W}	Tom Kelly	95–67	4–1	Toronto Blue Jays^{E}	Cito Gaston	91–71	
1992	1992	Toronto Blue Jays^{E}	Cito Gaston	96–66	4–2	Oakland Athletics^{W}	Tony La Russa	96–66	
1993	1993	Toronto Blue Jays^{E}	Cito Gaston	95–67	4–2	Chicago White Sox^{W}	Gene Lamont	94–68	
1994	Not held due to players' strike.								
1995^{[b]}	1995	Cleveland Indians^{C}	Mike Hargrove	100–44	4–2	Seattle Mariners^{W}	Lou Piniella	79–66	
1996	1996	New York Yankees^{E}	Joe Torre	92–70	4–1	Baltimore Orioles^{E†}	Davey Johnson	88–74	
1997	1997	Cleveland Indians^{C}	Mike Hargrove	86–75	4–2	Baltimore Orioles^{E}	Davey Johnson	98–64	
1998	1998	New York Yankees^{E}	Joe Torre	114–48	4–2	Cleveland Indians^{C}	Mike Hargrove	89–73	
1999	1999	New York Yankees^{E}	Joe Torre	98–64	4–1	Boston Red Sox^{E†}	Jimy Williams	94–68	
2000	2000	New York Yankees^{E}	Joe Torre	87–74	4–2	Seattle Mariners^{W†}	Lou Piniella	91–71	
2001	2001	New York Yankees^{E}	Joe Torre	95–65	4–1	Seattle Mariners^{W}	Lou Piniella	116–46	
2002	2002	Anaheim Angels^{W†}	Mike Scioscia	99–63	4–1	Minnesota Twins^{C}	Ron Gardenhire	94–67	
2003	2003	New York Yankees^{E}	Joe Torre	101–61	4–3	Boston Red Sox^{E†}	Grady Little	95–67	
2004	2004	Boston Red Sox^{E†}	Terry Francona	98–64	4–3	New York Yankees^{E}	Joe Torre	101–61	
2005	2005	Chicago White Sox^{C}	Ozzie Guillén	99–63	4–1	Los Angeles Angels^{W}^{[c]}	Mike Scioscia	95–67	
2006	2006	Detroit Tigers^{C†}	Jim Leyland	95–67	4–0	Oakland Athletics^{W}	Ken Macha	93–69	
2007	2007	Boston Red Sox^{E}	Terry Francona	96–66	4–3	Cleveland Indians^{C}	Eric Wedge	96–66	
2008	2008	Tampa Bay Rays^{E}	Joe Maddon	97–65	4–3	Boston Red Sox^{E†}	Terry Francona	95–67	
2009	2009	New York Yankees^{E}	Joe Girardi	103–59	4–2	Los Angeles Angels^{W}^{[c]}	Mike Scioscia	97–65	
2010	2010	Texas Rangers^{W}	Ron Washington	90–72	4–2	New York Yankees^{E†}	Joe Girardi	95–67	
2011	2011	Texas Rangers^{W}	Ron Washington	96–66	4–2	Detroit Tigers^{C}	Jim Leyland	95–67	
2012	2012	Detroit Tigers^{C}	Jim Leyland	88–74	4–0	New York Yankees^{E}	Joe Girardi	95–67	
2013	2013	Boston Red Sox^{E}	John Farrell	97–65	4–2	Detroit Tigers^{C}	Jim Leyland	93–69	
2014	2014	Kansas City Royals^{C†}	Ned Yost	89–73	4–0	Baltimore Orioles^{E}	Buck Showalter	96–66	
2015	2015	Kansas City Royals^{C}	Ned Yost	95–67	4–2	Toronto Blue Jays^{E}	John Gibbons	93–69	
2016	2016	Cleveland Indians^{C}	Terry Francona	94–67	4–1	Toronto Blue Jays^{E†}	John Gibbons	89–73	
2017	2017	Houston Astros^{W}	A. J. Hinch	101–61	4–3	New York Yankees^{E†}	Joe Girardi	91–71	
2018	2018	Boston Red Sox^{E}	Alex Cora	108–54	4–1	Houston Astros^{W}	A. J. Hinch	103–59	
2019	2019	Houston Astros^{W}	A. J. Hinch	107–55	4–2	New York Yankees^{E}	Aaron Boone	103–59	
2020	2020	Tampa Bay Rays^{E}	Kevin Cash	40–20	4–3	Houston Astros^{W}	Dusty Baker	29–31	
2021	2021	Houston Astros^{W}	Dusty Baker	95–67	4–2	Boston Red Sox^{E†}	Alex Cora	92–70	
2022	2022	Houston Astros^{W}	Dusty Baker	106–56	4–0	New York Yankees^{E}	Aaron Boone	99–63	
2023	2023	Texas Rangers^{W†}	Bruce Bochy	90–72	4–3	Houston Astros^{W}	Dusty Baker	90–72	
2024	2024	New York Yankees^{E}	Aaron Boone	94–68	4–1	Cleveland Guardians^{C}	Stephen Vogt	92–69	
2025	2025	Toronto Blue Jays^{E}	John Schneider	94–68	4–3	Seattle Mariners^{W}	Dan Wilson	90–72	
2026	2026	Tampa Bay Rays^{E}	Kevin Cash	98–64	4–2	Cleveland Guardians^{C}	Stephen Vogt	85–77	

Notes

- ^{a} A mid-season labor stoppage split the season into two halves. The winner of the first half played the winner of the second half in each division in the 1981 American League Division Series. The winners played in the 1981 ALCS for the American League pennant.
- ^{b} The leagues were re-aligned in 1994 to three divisions and a wild card was added to the playoffs, but the labor stoppage cancelled the postseason. Wild cards were first used in the 1995 playoffs.
- ^{c} While Los Angeles Angels of Anaheim was the official name of the team, the team was commonly referred to simply as "Los Angeles Angels", which they changed back to in 2016.

== Pennants won by franchise ==
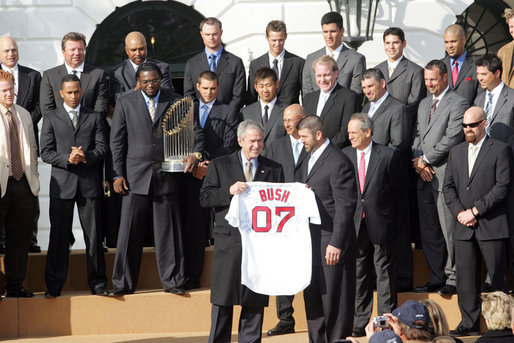
The Boston Red Sox won an American League pennant and the World Series in 2007, three years after accomplishing the same feat in 2004.

Team	Pennants won	Postseason appearances	Ref
New York Yankees^{[a]}	41	60	
Athletics^{[b]}	15	29	
Boston Red Sox^{[c]}	14	26	
Detroit Tigers	11	18	
Baltimore Orioles^{[d]}	7	16	
Minnesota Twins^{[e]}	6	18	
Cleveland Guardians^{[f]}	6	18	
Chicago White Sox	6	11	
Kansas City Royals	4	10	
Houston Astros^{[h]}	4	9	
Toronto Blue Jays	3	11	
Tampa Bay Rays^{[j]}	3	10	
Texas Rangers^{[g]}	3	9	
Los Angeles Angels^{[i]}	1	10	
Milwaukee Brewers^{[k]}	1	2	
Seattle Mariners	0	6	

Notes

- ^{a} Also known as New York Highlanders. In addition to their 41 official pennants, the Yankees had the best record in the American League when the 1994 season was cut short by a labor dispute.
- ^{b} Also known as Kansas City Athletics, Philadelphia Athletics, and Oakland Athletics.
- ^{c} Also known as Boston Americans.
- ^{d} Also known as St. Louis Browns and Milwaukee Brewers. This does not refer to the New York Yankees, who were known as the Baltimore Orioles in 1901 and 1902.
- ^{e} Also known as Washington Senators from 1901 to 1960 as called the Nationals from 1905 to 1955.
- ^{f} Also known as Cleveland Bluebirds (Blues), Cleveland Bronchos, Cleveland Naps, and Cleveland Indians.
- ^{g} Also known as Washington Senators from 1961 to 1971.
- ^{h} Also known as Houston Colt .45's from 1962 to 1964. This does not include one National League pennant and nine playoff appearances.
- ^{i} Also known as Anaheim Angels, California Angels, and Los Angeles Angels of Anaheim.
- ^{j} Also known as Tampa Bay Devil Rays.
- ^{k} Also known as Seattle Pilots in 1969. The Brewers were members of the American League through the 1997 season after which they switched to the National League. This table records only the Brewers' American League accomplishments.

== See also ==
- National League Championship Series
- List of National League pennant winners
- List of World Series champions
