= 1943 Cleveland Indians season =

1943 Cleveland Indians
- League: American League
- Ballpark: League Park; Cleveland Municipal Stadium
- City: Cleveland, Ohio
- Owners: Alva Bradley
- General managers: Roger Peckinpaugh
- Managers: Lou Boudreau
- Radio: WCLE · WHK (Jack Graney, Lew Henry)

The 1943 Cleveland Indians season was a season in American major league baseball. The team finished third in the American League with a record of 82–71.

== Offseason ==
- Prior to 1943 season (exact date unknown)
  - Sherm Lollar was signed as an amateur free agent by the Indians.
  - Pete Milne was signed as an amateur free agent by the Indians.

== Regular season ==
=== Season standings ===
American League
Team	W	L	Pct.	GB	Home	Road
New York Yankees	98	56	.636	—	54‍–‍23	44‍–‍33
Washington Senators	84	69	.549	13½	44‍–‍32	40‍–‍37
Cleveland Indians	82	71	.536	15½	44‍–‍33	38‍–‍38
Chicago White Sox	82	72	.532	16	40‍–‍36	42‍–‍36
Detroit Tigers	78	76	.506	20	45‍–‍32	33‍–‍44
St. Louis Browns	72	80	.474	25	44‍–‍33	28‍–‍47
Boston Red Sox	68	84	.447	29	39‍–‍36	29‍–‍48
Philadelphia Athletics	49	105	.318	49	27‍–‍51	22‍–‍54

=== Record vs. opponents ===
1943 American League record Sources:
Team	BOS	CWS	CLE	DET	NYY	PHA	SLB	WSH
Boston	—	8–14	12–10	11–11–1	5–17–1	11–11	11–9–1	10–12
Chicago	14–8	—	7–15	9–13	10–12	18–4–1	10–12	14–8
Cleveland	10–12	15–7	—	15–7	9–13	16–6	9–13	8–13
Detroit	11–11–1	13–9	7–15	—	10–12	13–9	11–11	13–9
New York	17–5–1	12–10	13–9	12–10	—	16–6	17–5	11–11
Philadelphia	11–11	4–18–1	6–16	9–13	6–16	—	8–14	5–17
St. Louis	9–11–1	12–10	13–9	11–11	5–17	14–8	—	8–14
Washington	12–10	8–14	13–8	9–13	11–11	17–5	14–8	—

=== Roster ===
1943 Cleveland Indians
Roster
Pitchers: 17 Jim Bagby; 47 Paul Calvert; 7 Pete Center; 16 Chubby Dean; 25 Steve Gromek; 18 Mel Harder; 11 Joe Heving; 12 Vern Kennedy; 39 Ed Klieman; 20 Al Milnar; 31 Mike Naymick; 35 Ray Poat; 21 Allie Reynolds; 38 Jack Salveson; 32 Al Smith	Catchers: 4 Gene Desautels; 22 Jim McDonnell; 2 Buddy Rosar; 28 George Susce; Infielders: 5 Lou Boudreau; 9 Otto Denning; 36 Jimmy Grant; 8 Ken Keltner; 6 Ray Mack; 3 Rusty Peters; 9 Mickey Rocco; 14 Eddie Turchin	Outfielders: 1 Roy Cullenbine; -- Frank Doljack; 33 Hank Edwards; 24 Jeff Heath; 34 Oris Hockett; 23 Pat Seerey; 46 Gene Woodling	Manager: 5 Lou Boudreau; Coaches: 27 Del Baker; 26 Burt Shotton; 28 George Susce

== Player stats ==
=== Batting ===
==== Starters by position ====
Note: Pos = Position; G = Games played; AB = At bats; H = Hits; Avg. = Batting average; HR = Home runs; RBI = Runs batted in

Pos	Player	G	AB	H	Avg.	HR	RBI
C	Buddy Rosar	115	382	108	.283	1	41
1B	Mickey Rocco	108	405	97	.240	5	46
2B	Ray Mack	153	545	120	.220	7	62
SS	Lou Boudreau	152	539	154	.286	3	67
3B	Ken Keltner	110	427	111	.260	4	39
OF	Oris Hockett	141	601	166	.276	2	51
OF	Jeff Heath	118	424	116	.274	18	79
OF	Roy Cullenbine	138	488	141	.289	8	56

=== Other batters ===
Note: G = Games played; AB = At bats; H = Hits; Avg. = Batting average; HR = Home runs; RBI = Runs batted in

Player	G	AB	H	Avg.	HR	RBI
Hank Edwards	92	297	82	.276	3	28
Rusty Peters	79	215	47	.219	1	19
Gene Desautels	68	185	38	.205	0	19
Otto Denning	37	129	31	.240	0	13
Pat Seerey	26	72	16	.222	1	5
Gene Woodling	8	25	8	.320	1	5
Jimmy Grant	15	22	3	.136	0	1
Eddie Turchin	11	13	3	.231	0	1
Frank Doljack	3	7	0	.000	0	0
Jim McDonnell	2	1	0	.000	0	0
George Susce	3	1	0	.000	0	0

=== Pitching ===
==== Starting pitchers ====
Note: G = Games pitched; IP = Innings pitched; W = Wins; L = Losses; ERA = Earned run average; SO = Strikeouts

Player	G	IP	W	L	ERA	SO
Jim Bagby	36	273.0	17	14	3.10	70
Al Smith	29	208.1	17	7	2.55	72
Allie Reynolds	34	198.2	11	12	2.99	151
Vern Kennedy	28	146.2	10	7	2.45	63
Mel Harder	19	135.1	8	7	3.06	40

==== Other pitchers ====
Note: G = Games pitched; IP = Innings pitched; W = Wins; L = Losses; ERA = Earned run average; SO = Strikeouts

Player	G	IP	W	L	ERA	SO
Ray Poat	17	45.0	2	5	4.40	31
Al Milnar	16	39.0	1	3	8.08	12
Ed Klieman	1	9.0	0	1	1.00	2
Paul Calvert	5	8.1	0	0	4.32	2
Steve Gromek	3	4.0	0	0	9.00	4

=== Relief pitchers ===
Note: G = Games pitched; W = Wins; L = Losses; SV = Saves; ERA = Earned run average; SO = Strikeouts

Player	G	W	L	SV	ERA	SO
Joe Heving	30	1	1	9	2.75	34
Jack Salveson	23	5	3	3	3.35	24
Mike Naymick	29	4	4	2	2.30	41
Pete Center	24	1	2	1	2.76	10
Chubby Dean	17	5	5	0	4.50	29

== Awards and honors ==
All-Star Game

Lou Boudreau, Shortstop

Roy Cullenbine, Outfielder

Oris Hockett, Outfielder

Ken Keltner, Third baseman (starter)

== Farm system ==
Level	Team	League	Manager
AA	Baltimore Orioles	International League	Alphonse "Tommy" Thomas
A	Wilkes-Barre Barons	Eastern League	Tony Lazzeri
D	Batavia Clippers	PONY League	Earl Wolgamot
