= 1943 Detroit Tigers season =

Major League Baseball season

1943 Detroit Tigers
- League: American League
- Ballpark: Briggs Stadium
- City: Detroit
- Record: 78–76 (.506)
- League place: 5th
- Owners: Walter Briggs, Sr.
- General managers: Jack Zeller
- Managers: Steve O'Neill
- Radio: WXYZ (Harry Heilmann)

The 1943 Detroit Tigers season was a season in American baseball. The team finished fifth in the American League with a record of 78–76, 20 games behind the New York Yankees.

== Offseason ==
- November 2, 1942: Johnny Welaj was drafted from the Tigers by the Philadelphia Athletics in the 1942 rule 5 draft.

== Regular season ==
=== Season standings ===
American League
Team	W	L	Pct.	GB	Home	Road
New York Yankees	98	56	.636	—	54‍–‍23	44‍–‍33
Washington Senators	84	69	.549	13½	44‍–‍32	40‍–‍37
Cleveland Indians	82	71	.536	15½	44‍–‍33	38‍–‍38
Chicago White Sox	82	72	.532	16	40‍–‍36	42‍–‍36
Detroit Tigers	78	76	.506	20	45‍–‍32	33‍–‍44
St. Louis Browns	72	80	.474	25	44‍–‍33	28‍–‍47
Boston Red Sox	68	84	.447	29	39‍–‍36	29‍–‍48
Philadelphia Athletics	49	105	.318	49	27‍–‍51	22‍–‍54

=== Record vs. opponents ===
1943 American League record Sources:
Team	BOS	CWS	CLE	DET	NYY	PHA	SLB	WSH
Boston	—	8–14	12–10	11–11–1	5–17–1	11–11	11–9–1	10–12
Chicago	14–8	—	7–15	9–13	10–12	18–4–1	10–12	14–8
Cleveland	10–12	15–7	—	15–7	9–13	16–6	9–13	8–13
Detroit	11–11–1	13–9	7–15	—	10–12	13–9	11–11	13–9
New York	17–5–1	12–10	13–9	12–10	—	16–6	17–5	11–11
Philadelphia	11–11	4–18–1	6–16	9–13	6–16	—	8–14	5–17
St. Louis	9–11–1	12–10	13–9	11–11	5–17	14–8	—	8–14
Washington	12–10	8–14	13–8	9–13	11–11	17–5	14–8	—

=== Roster ===
1943 Detroit Tigers
Roster
Pitchers: 10 Tommy Bridges; -- Rufe Gentry; 15 Johnny Gorsica; 18 Roy Henshaw; 16 Hal Newhouser; 14 Prince Oana; 14 Joe Orrell; 19 Stubby Overmire; 11 Dizzy Trout; 22 Virgil Trucks; 25 Hal White	Catchers: 23 Dixie Parsons; 9 Paul Richards; 30 Al Unser; Infielders: 3 Jimmy Bloodworth; 6 Pinky Higgins; 7 Joe Hoover; 24 Joe Wood; 4 Rudy York	Outfielders: 8 Doc Cramer; 26 Ned Harris; 21 Charlie Metro; -- Jimmy Outlaw; 5 Rip Radcliff; 20 Don Ross; 2 Dick Wakefield; Other batters: 27 John McHale	Manager: 32 Steve O'Neill; Coaches: 31 Al Vincent

== Player stats ==
= Indicates team leader

= Indicates league leader

=== Batting ===
==== Starters by position ====
Note: Pos = Position; G = Games played; AB = At bats; H = Hits; Avg. = Batting average; HR = Home runs; RBI = Runs batted in

Pos	Player	G	AB	H	Avg.	HR	RBI
C	Paul Richards	100	313	69	.220	5	33
1B	Rudy York	155	571	155	.271	34	118
2B	Jimmy Bloodworth	129	474	114	.241	6	52
SS	Joe Hoover	144	575	140	.243	4	38
3B	Pinky Higgins	138	523	145	.277	10	84
OF	Doc Cramer	140	606	182	.300	1	43
OF	Dick Wakefield	155	633	200	.316	7	79
OF	Ned Harris	114	354	90	.254	6	32

==== Other batters ====
Note: G = Games played; AB = At bats; H = Hits; Avg. = Batting average; HR = Home runs; RBI = Runs batted in

Player	G	AB	H	Avg.	HR	RBI
Don Ross	89	247	66	.267	0	18
Joe Wood	60	164	53	.323	1	17
Rip Radcliff	70	115	30	.261	0	10
Dixie Parsons	40	106	15	.142	0	4
Al Unser	38	101	25	.248	0	4
Jimmy Outlaw	20	67	18	.269	1	6
Charlie Metro	44	40	8	.200	0	2
John McHale	4	3	0	.000	0	0

=== Pitching ===
==== Starting pitchers ====
Note: G = Games pitched; IP = Innings pitched; W = Wins; L = Losses; ERA = Earned run average; SO = Strikeouts

Player	G	IP	W	L	ERA	SO
Dizzy Trout	44	246.2	20*	12	2.48	111
Virgil Trucks	33	202.2	16	10	2.84	118
Hal Newhouser	37	195.2	8	17	3.04	144
Tommy Bridges	25	191.2	12	7	2.39	124
Hal White	32	177.2	7	12	3.39	58
Rufe Gentry	4	29.1	1	3	3.68	8

- Tied with Spud Chandler (New York)

==== Other pitchers ====
Note: G = Games pitched; IP = Innings pitched; W = Wins; L = Losses; ERA = Earned run average; SO = Strikeouts

Player	G	IP	W	L	ERA	SO
Stubby Overmire	29	147.0	7	6	3.18	48

==== Relief pitchers ====
Note: G = Games pitched; W = Wins; L = Losses; SV = Saves; ERA = Earned run average; SO = Strikeouts

Player	G	W	L	SV	ERA	SO
Johnny Gorsica	35	4	5	5	3.36	45
Roy Henshaw	26	0	2	2	3.79	33
Prince Oana	10	3	2	0	4.50	15
Joe Orrell	10	0	0	1	3.72	2

== Awards and honors ==
=== League leaders ===
- Rudy York, Major league home run champion, (34)
- Rudy York, American League RBI champion, (118)

== Farm system ==
Level	Team	League	Manager
AA	Buffalo Bisons	International League	Greg Mulleavy
B	Hagerstown Owls	Interstate League	Eddie Phillips and Bobby Maier
