= 1943 St. Louis Browns season =

Major League Baseball season

1943 St. Louis Browns
- League: American League
- Ballpark: Sportsman's Park
- City: St. Louis, Missouri
- Record: 72–80 (.474)
- League place: 6th
- Owners: Donald Lee Barnes
- General managers: Bill DeWitt
- Managers: Luke Sewell
- Radio: KWK (Dizzy Dean, Johnny O'Hara); KXOK (France Laux, Ron Rawson)

The 1943 St. Louis Browns season involved the Browns finishing 6th in the American League with a record of 72 wins and 80 losses.

== Offseason ==
- November 7, 1942: Hal Epps was drafted by the Browns from the St. Louis Cardinals in the 1942 minor league draft.
- February 1, 1943: Paul Dean, brother of Browns broadcaster Dizzy Dean, was purchased by the Browns from the Washington Senators.

== Regular season ==
=== Season standings ===
American League
Team	W	L	Pct.	GB	Home	Road
New York Yankees	98	56	.636	—	54‍–‍23	44‍–‍33
Washington Senators	84	69	.549	13½	44‍–‍32	40‍–‍37
Cleveland Indians	82	71	.536	15½	44‍–‍33	38‍–‍38
Chicago White Sox	82	72	.532	16	40‍–‍36	42‍–‍36
Detroit Tigers	78	76	.506	20	45‍–‍32	33‍–‍44
St. Louis Browns	72	80	.474	25	44‍–‍33	28‍–‍47
Boston Red Sox	68	84	.447	29	39‍–‍36	29‍–‍48
Philadelphia Athletics	49	105	.318	49	27‍–‍51	22‍–‍54

=== Record vs. opponents ===
1943 American League record Sources:
Team	BOS	CWS	CLE	DET	NYY	PHA	SLB	WSH
Boston	—	8–14	12–10	11–11–1	5–17–1	11–11	11–9–1	10–12
Chicago	14–8	—	7–15	9–13	10–12	18–4–1	10–12	14–8
Cleveland	10–12	15–7	—	15–7	9–13	16–6	9–13	8–13
Detroit	11–11–1	13–9	7–15	—	10–12	13–9	11–11	13–9
New York	17–5–1	12–10	13–9	12–10	—	16–6	17–5	11–11
Philadelphia	11–11	4–18–1	6–16	9–13	6–16	—	8–14	5–17
St. Louis	9–11–1	12–10	13–9	11–11	5–17	14–8	—	8–14
Washington	12–10	8–14	13–8	9–13	11–11	17–5	14–8	—

=== Roster ===
1943 St. Louis Browns
Roster
Pitchers: 16 George Caster; 19 Paul Dean; 23 Charlie Fuchs; 22 Denny Galehouse; 25 Al Hollingsworth; 27 Jack Kramer; 19 Al LaMacchia; 36 Archie McKain; 36 Ox Miller; 30 Al Milnar; 29 Bob Muncrief; 15,33 Bobo Newsom; 21 Johnny Niggeling; 23 Fritz Ostermueller; 38 Sid Peterson; 24 Nels Potter; -- Fred Sanford; 17 Steve Sundra	Catchers: 9 Rick Ferrell; 8 Frankie Hayes; 20 Joe Schultz; Infielders: 2 Floyd Baker; 6 Mark Christman; 2 Ellis Clary; 7 Harlond Clift; 4 Don Gutteridge; 1 Don Heffner; 3 George McQuinn; 5 Vern Stephens	Outfielders: 11 Milt Byrnes; 10 Mike Chartak; 14 Tony Criscola; 15 Hal Epps; 12 Mike Kreevich; 28 Chet Laabs; 14 Al Zarilla; Other batters: -- Hank Schmulbach	Manager: 32 Luke Sewell; Coaches: 33 Fred Hofmann; 34 Zack Taylor

== Player stats ==
= Indicates team leader

=== Batting ===
==== Starters by position ====
Note: Pos = Position; G = Games played; AB = At bats; H = Hits; Avg. = Batting average; HR = Home runs; RBI = Runs batted in

Pos	Player	G	AB	H	Avg.	HR	RBI
C	Frankie Hayes	88	250	47	.188	5	30
1B	George McQuinn	125	449	109	.243	12	74
2B	Don Gutteridge	132	538	147	.273	1	36
SS	Vern Stephens	137	512	148	.289	22	91
3B	Harlond Clift	105	379	88	.232	3	25
OF	Mike Chartak	108	344	88	.256	10	37
OF	Milt Byrnes	129	429	120	.280	4	50
OF	Chet Laabs	151	580	145	.250	17	85

==== Other batters ====
Note: G = Games played; AB = At bats; H = Hits; Avg. = Batting average; HR = Home runs; RBI = Runs batted in

Player	G	AB	H	Avg.	HR	RBI
Mark Christman	98	336	91	.271	2	35
Al Zarilla	70	228	58	.254	2	17
Rick Ferrell	74	209	50	.239	0	20
Mike Kreevich	60	161	41	.255	0	10
Joe Schultz Jr.	46	92	22	.239	0	8
Ellis Clary	23	69	19	.275	0	5
Tony Criscola	29	52	8	.154	0	1
Floyd Baker	22	46	8	.174	0	4
Hal Epps	8	35	10	.286	0	1
Don Heffner	18	33	4	.121	0	2
Hank Schmulbach	1	0	0	----	0	0

=== Pitching ===
==== Starting pitchers ====
Note: G = Games pitched; IP = Innings pitched; W = Wins; L = Losses; ERA = Earned run average; SO = Strikeouts

Player	G	IP	W	L	ERA	SO
Denny Galehouse	31	224.0	11	11	2.77	114
Steve Sundra	32	208.0	15	11	3.25	44
Bob Muncrief	35	205.0	13	12	2.81	80
Johnny Niggeling	20	150.1	6	8	3.17	73
Bobo Newsom	10	52.1	1	6	7.39	37
Al LaMacchia	1	4.0	0	1	11.25	2

==== Other pitchers ====
Note: G = Games pitched; IP = Innings pitched; W = Wins; L = Losses; ERA = Earned run average; SO = Strikeouts

Player	G	IP	W	L	ERA	SO
Nels Potter	33	168.1	10	5	2.78	80
Al Hollingsworth	35	154.0	6	13	4.21	63
Fritz Ostermueller	11	28.2	0	2	5.02	4
Al Milnar	3	14.2	1	2	5.52	7
Paul Dean	3	13.1	0	0	3.38	1

==== Relief pitchers ====
Note: G = Games pitched; W = Wins; L = Losses; SV = Saves; ERA = Earned run average; SO = Strikeouts

Player	G	W	L	SV	ERA	SO
George Caster	35	6	8	8	2.12	43
Charlie Fuchs	13	0	0	0	4.04	9
Archie McKain	10	1	1	0	3.94	6
Sid Peterson	3	2	0	0	2.70	0
Fred Sanford	3	0	0	0	1.93	2
Jack Kramer	3	0	0	0	8.00	4
Ox Miller	2	0	0	0	12.00	3

== Farm system ==
Level	Team	League	Manager
AA	Toledo Mud Hens	American Association	Jack Fournier

== Awards and honors ==
- Vern Stephens, American League All-Star
