= 1943 Boston Red Sox season =

Major League Baseball season

1943 Boston Red Sox
- League: American League
- Ballpark: Fenway Park
- City: Boston, Massachusetts
- Record: 68–84 (.447)
- League place: 7th
- Owners: Tom Yawkey
- President: Tom Yawkey
- General managers: Eddie Collins
- Managers: Joe Cronin
- Radio: WAAB (Jim Britt); WNAC (Tom Hussey, George Hartrick)
- Stats: ESPN.com; Baseball Reference

The 1943 Boston Red Sox season was the 43rd season in the franchise's Major League Baseball history. The Red Sox finished seventh in the American League (AL) with a record of 68 wins and 84 losses, 29 games behind the New York Yankees, who went on to win the 1943 World Series.

The Red Sox set a major league record, which still stands, by playing in 31 extra innings games. In those games, the Red Sox compiled a record of 15 wins and 14 losses, with two ties. They played 73 extra innings in total, equivalent to playing an additional eight 9-inning games.

== Offseason ==
- Due to wartime considerations, the team held spring training at Tufts University in Medford, Massachusetts.
- Prior to 1943 season: Bill Howerton was signed as an amateur free agent by the Red Sox.

== Regular season ==
=== Season standings ===
American League
Team	W	L	Pct.	GB	Home	Road
New York Yankees	98	56	.636	—	54‍–‍23	44‍–‍33
Washington Senators	84	69	.549	13½	44‍–‍32	40‍–‍37
Cleveland Indians	82	71	.536	15½	44‍–‍33	38‍–‍38
Chicago White Sox	82	72	.532	16	40‍–‍36	42‍–‍36
Detroit Tigers	78	76	.506	20	45‍–‍32	33‍–‍44
St. Louis Browns	72	80	.474	25	44‍–‍33	28‍–‍47
Boston Red Sox	68	84	.447	29	39‍–‍36	29‍–‍48
Philadelphia Athletics	49	105	.318	49	27‍–‍51	22‍–‍54

=== Record vs. opponents ===
1943 American League record Sources:
Team	BOS	CWS	CLE	DET	NYY	PHA	SLB	WSH
Boston	—	8–14	12–10	11–11–1	5–17–1	11–11	11–9–1	10–12
Chicago	14–8	—	7–15	9–13	10–12	18–4–1	10–12	14–8
Cleveland	10–12	15–7	—	15–7	9–13	16–6	9–13	8–13
Detroit	11–11–1	13–9	7–15	—	10–12	13–9	11–11	13–9
New York	17–5–1	12–10	13–9	12–10	—	16–6	17–5	11–11
Philadelphia	11–11	4–18–1	6–16	9–13	6–16	—	8–14	5–17
St. Louis	9–11–1	12–10	13–9	11–11	5–17	14–8	—	8–14
Washington	12–10	8–14	13–8	9–13	11–11	17–5	14–8	—

=== Opening Day lineup ===
7	Eddie Lake	SS
12	Pete Fox	RF
1	Bobby Doerr	2B
14	Johnny Lazor	LF
3	Tony Lupien	1B
15	Ford Garrison	CF
26	Skeeter Newsome	3B
11	Johnny Peacock	C
21	Tex Hughson	P

=== Transactions ===
June 2: Joe Green, a pitcher for the University of North Carolina Baseball Team, signs a contract with the Red Sox and joins the Roanoke Red Sox.

June 14: The Red Sox trade pitcher Ken Chase to the New York Giants in exchange for outfielder Babe Barna.

=== Roster ===
1943 Boston Red Sox
Roster
Pitchers: 25 Mace Brown; 10 Ken Chase; 17 Joe Dobson; 15 Tex Hughson; 29 Oscar Judd; 19 Andy Karl; 15 Lou Lucier; 28 Dick Newsome; 15 Emmett O'Neill; 20 Mike Ryba; 18 Yank Terry; 10 Pinky Woods	Catchers: 23 Bill Conroy; 24 Danny Doyle; 6 Roy Partee; 11 Johnny Peacock; Infielders: 4 Joe Cronin; 1 Bobby Doerr; 7 Eddie Lake; 3 Tony Lupien; 26 Skeeter Newsome; 5 Jim Tabor	Outfielders: 42 Babe Barna; 27 Leon Culberson; 12 Pete Fox; 15 Ford Garrison; 82 Johnny Lazor; 42 Tom McBride; 2 Catfish Metkovich; 2 Dee Miles; 8 Al Simmons	Manager: 4 Joe Cronin; Coaches: 30 Tom Daly (Third base); 31 Frank Shellenback (Pitching); 22 Larry Woodall (First base)

== Player stats ==
= Indicates team leader

=== Batting ===
==== Starters by position ====
Note: Pos = Position; G = Games played; AB = At bats; H = Hits; Avg. = Batting average; HR = Home runs; RBI = Runs batted in

Pos	Player	G	AB	H	Avg.	HR	RBI
C	Roy Partee	96	299	84	.281	0	31
1B	Tony Lupien	154	608	155	.255	4	47
2B	Bobby Doerr	155	604	163	.270	16	75
SS	Skeeter Newsome	114	449	119	.265	1	22
3B	Jim Tabor	137	537	130	.242	13	85
OF	Leon Culberson	81	312	85	.272	3	34
OF	George Metkovich	78	321	79	.246	5	27
OF	Pete Fox	127	489	141	.288	2	44

==== Other batters ====
Note: G = Games played; AB = At bats; H = Hits; Avg. = Batting average; HR = Home runs; RBI = Runs batted in

Player	G	AB	H	Avg.	HR	RBI
Eddie Lake	75	216	43	.199	3	16
Johnny Lazor	83	208	47	.226	0	13
Al Simmons	40	133	27	.203	1	12
Ford Garrison	36	129	36	.279	1	11
Dee Miles	45	121	26	.215	0	10
Johnny Peacock	48	114	23	.202	0	7
Babe Barna	30	112	19	.170	2	10
Tom McBride	26	96	23	.240	0	7
Bill Conroy	39	89	16	.180	1	6
Joe Cronin	59	77	24	.312	5	29
Danny Doyle	13	43	9	.209	0	6

=== Pitching ===
==== Starting pitchers ====
Note: G = Games pitched; IP = Innings pitched; W = Wins; L = Losses; ERA = Earned run average; SO = Strikeouts

Player	G	IP	W	L	ERA	SO
Tex Hughson	35	266.0	12	15	2.64	114
Joe Dobson	25	164.1	7	11	3.12	63
Yank Terry	30	163.2	7	9	3.52	63
Oscar Judd	23	155.1	11	6	2.90	53
Dick Newsome	25	154.1	8	13	4.49	40

==== Other pitchers ====
Note: G = Games pitched; IP = Innings pitched; W = Wins; L = Losses; ERA = Earned run average; SO = Strikeouts

Player	G	IP	W	L	ERA	SO
Mike Ryba	40	143.2	7	5	3.26	50
Pinky Woods	23	100.2	5	6	4.92	32
Lou Lucier	16	74.0	3	4	3.89	23
Emmett O'Neill	11	57.2	1	4	4.53	20
Ken Chase	7	27.1	0	4	6.91	9

==== Relief pitchers ====
Note: G = Games pitched; W = Wins; L = Losses; SV = Saves; ERA = Earned run average; SO = Strikeouts

Player	G	W	L	SV	ERA	SO
Mace Brown	49	6	6	9	2.12	40
Andy Karl	11	1	1	1	3.46	6

== Farm system ==
Level	Team	League	Manager
AA	Louisville Colonels	American Association	Bill Burwell
A	Scranton Red Sox	Eastern League	Nemo Leibold
B	Roanoke Red Sox	Piedmont League	Heinie Manush
