= 1943 New York Yankees season =

Season for the Major League Baseball team the New York Yankees

1943 New York Yankees
- World Series champions American League champions
- League: American League
- Ballpark: Yankee Stadium
- City: New York City
- Record: 98–56 (.636)
- League place: 1st
- Owners: Estate of Jacob Ruppert
- General managers: Ed Barrow
- Managers: Joe McCarthy

The 1943 New York Yankees season was the team's 41st season. The team finished with a record of 98–56, winning their 14th pennant, finishing 13.5 games ahead of the Washington Senators. Managed by Joe McCarthy, the Yankees played at Yankee Stadium. In the World Series, they defeated the St. Louis Cardinals in 5 games.

== Offseason ==
- January 29, 1943: Milo Candini and Jerry Priddy were traded by the Yankees to the Washington Senators for Bill Zuber and cash.

== Regular season ==
=== Season standings ===
American League
Team	W	L	Pct.	GB	Home	Road
New York Yankees	98	56	.636	—	54‍–‍23	44‍–‍33
Washington Senators	84	69	.549	13½	44‍–‍32	40‍–‍37
Cleveland Indians	82	71	.536	15½	44‍–‍33	38‍–‍38
Chicago White Sox	82	72	.532	16	40‍–‍36	42‍–‍36
Detroit Tigers	78	76	.506	20	45‍–‍32	33‍–‍44
St. Louis Browns	72	80	.474	25	44‍–‍33	28‍–‍47
Boston Red Sox	68	84	.447	29	39‍–‍36	29‍–‍48
Philadelphia Athletics	49	105	.318	49	27‍–‍51	22‍–‍54

=== Record vs. opponents ===
1943 American League record Sources:
Team	BOS	CWS	CLE	DET	NYY	PHA	SLB	WSH
Boston	—	8–14	12–10	11–11–1	5–17–1	11–11	11–9–1	10–12
Chicago	14–8	—	7–15	9–13	10–12	18–4–1	10–12	14–8
Cleveland	10–12	15–7	—	15–7	9–13	16–6	9–13	8–13
Detroit	11–11–1	13–9	7–15	—	10–12	13–9	11–11	13–9
New York	17–5–1	12–10	13–9	12–10	—	16–6	17–5	11–11
Philadelphia	11–11	4–18–1	6–16	9–13	6–16	—	8–14	5–17
St. Louis	9–11–1	12–10	13–9	11–11	5–17	14–8	—	8–14
Washington	12–10	8–14	13–8	9–13	11–11	17–5	14–8	—

=== Roster ===
1943 New York Yankees
Roster
Pitchers: 20 Tiny Bonham; 15 Hank Borowy; 24 Marv Breuer; 11 Tommy Byrne; 21 Spud Chandler; 28 Atley Donald; 19 Johnny Murphy; 22 Marius Russo; 30 Jim Turner; 14 Butch Wensloff; 17 Bill Zuber	Catchers: 8 Bill Dickey; 27 Rollie Hemsley; 26 Ken Sears; Infielders: 1 Frankie Crosetti; 5 Nick Etten; 6 Joe Gordon; 12,29 Oscar Grimes; 7 Billy Johnson; 6 Snuffy Stirnweiss	Outfielders: 9 Charlie Keller; 18 Johnny Lindell; 3 Bud Metheny; 16 Tuck Stainback; 10 Roy Weatherly; Other batters: 25 Aaron Robinson	Manager: -- Joe McCarthy; Coaches: 32 Earle Combs; 31 Art Fletcher; 33 Johnny Schulte

== Player stats ==
= Indicates team leader

= Indicates league leader

=== Batting ===
==== Starters by position ====
Note: Pos = Position; G = Games played; AB = At bats; H = Hits; Avg. = Batting average; HR = Home runs; RBI = Runs batted in

Pos	Player	G	AB	H	Avg.	HR	RBI
C	Bill Dickey	85	242	85	.351	4	33
1B	Nick Etten	154	583	158	.271	14	107
2B	Joe Gordon	152	543	135	.249	17	69
3B	Billy Johnson	155	592	166	.280	5	94
SS	Frankie Crosetti	95	348	81	.233	2	20
OF	Charlie Keller	141	512	139	.271	31	86
OF	Johnny Lindell	122	441	108	.245	4	51
OF	Bud Metheny	103	360	94	.261	9	36

==== Other batters ====
Note: G = Games played; AB = At bats; H = Hits; Avg. = Batting average; HR = Home runs; RBI = Runs batted in

Player	G	AB	H	Avg.	HR	RBI
Roy Weatherly	77	280	74	.264	7	28
Snuffy Stirnweiss	83	274	60	.219	1	25
Tuck Stainback	71	231	60	.260	0	10
Ken Sears	60	187	52	.278	2	22
Rollie Hemsley	62	180	43	.239	2	24
Oscar Grimes	9	20	3	.150	0	1
Aaron Robinson	1	1	0	.000	0	0

=== Pitching ===
==== Starting pitchers ====
Note: G = Games pitched; IP = Innings pitched; W = Wins; L = Losses; ERA = Earned run average; SO = Strikeouts

Player	G	IP	W	L	ERA	SO
Spud Chandler	30	253.0	20*	4	1.64	134
Tiny Bonham	28	225.2	15	8	2.27	71
Butch Wensloff	29	223.1	13	11	2.54	105
Hank Borowy	29	217.1	14	9	2.82	113
Atley Donald	22	119.1	6	4	4.60	57

- Tied with Dizzy Trout (Detroit)

==== Other pitchers ====
Note: G = Games pitched; IP = Innings pitched; W = Wins; L = Losses; ERA = Earned run average; SO = Strikeouts

Player	G	IP	W	L	ERA	SO
Bill Zuber	20	118.0	8	4	3.89	57
Marius Russo	24	101.2	5	10	3.72	42
Tommy Byrne	11	31.2	2	1	6.54	22
Marv Breuer	5	14.0	0	1	8.36	6

==== Relief pitchers ====
Note: G = Games pitched; W = Wins; L = Losses; SV = Saves; ERA = Earned run average; SO = Strikeouts

Player	G	W	L	SV	ERA	SO
Johnny Murphy	37	12	4	8	2.51	31
Jim Turner	18	3	0	1	3.53	15

== 1943 World Series ==
AL New York Yankees (4) vs. NL St. Louis Cardinals (1)

Game	Score	Date	Location	Attendance
1	Cardinals – 2, Yankees – 4	October 5	Yankee Stadium	68,676
2	Cardinals – 4, Yankees – 3	October 6	Yankee Stadium	68,578
3	Cardinals – 2, Yankees – 6	October 7	Yankee Stadium	69,990
4	Yankees – 2, Cardinals – 1	October 10	Sportsman's Park	36,196
5	Yankees – 2, Cardinals – 0	October 11	Sportsman's Park	33,872

== Awards and records ==
- Spud Chandler, American League MVP (He was the oldest American League player in the 20th Century to win the MVP Award.)

=== Franchise records ===
- Spud Chandler, Yankees single season record, Lowest earned run average in a season (1.64)

== Farm system ==
Level	Team	League	Manager
AA	Kansas City Blues	American Association	Johnny Neun
AA	Newark Bears	International League	Billy Meyer
A	Binghamton Triplets	Eastern League	Eddie Sawyer
B	Norfolk Tars	Piedmont League	Tom Kain
D	Wellsville Yankees	PONY League	Herb Brett and Solly Mishkin

LEAGUE CHAMPIONS: Norfolk, Wellsville
