= Eddie Turchin =

American baseball player (1917–1982)

- Infielder
- Born: February 10, 1917; New York City, US
- Died: February 8, 1982 (aged 64); Brookhaven, New York, US
- Batted: Right Threw: Right

MLB debut
- May 9, 1943, for the Cleveland Indians

Last MLB appearance
- May 31, 1943, for the Cleveland Indians

MLB statistics
- Batting average: .231
- Home runs: 0
- Runs batted in: 1
- Stats at Baseball Reference

Teams
- Cleveland Indians (1943)

Edward Lawrence Turchin (February 10, 1917 – February 8, 1982) was an American professional baseball infielder. He played one season in Major League Baseball (MLB) with the Cleveland Indians.

== Biography ==
Turchin, nicknamed "Smiley", had a minor league baseball career spanning 1937 to 1946, with gaps, as he did not play professionally during 1938, 1944, or 1945. He was one of many players who only appeared in the major leagues during World War II, appearing in 11 games for the 1943 Cleveland Indians, spending time as a third baseman and shortstop. With the Indians, he batted 3-for-13 (.231) with one RBI.

Turchin was born in New York City, and served in the United States Navy during World War II. He was Jewish, and attended Brooklyn College. He died in 1982, two days before his 65th birthday, in Brookhaven, New York.
