= Bill Burgo =

American baseball player (1919-1988)

- Left fielder
- Born: November 15, 1919; Johnstown, Pennsylvania, U.S.
- Died: October 19, 1988 (aged 68); Morgan City, Louisiana, U.S.
- Batted: Right Threw: Right

MLB debut
- September 22, 1943, for the Philadelphia Athletics

Last MLB appearance
- June 11, 1944, for the Philadelphia Athletics

MLB statistics
- Batting average: .297
- Home runs: 2
- Runs batted in: 12
- Stats at Baseball Reference

Teams
- Philadelphia Athletics (1943–1944)

William Ross Burgo (November 15, 1919 – October 19, 1988) was an American Major League Baseball outfielder who played for the Philadelphia Athletics in 1943 and 1944. He was a native of Johnstown, Pennsylvania. He batted and threw right-handed.

== Formative years ==
Burgo was born in Johnstown, Pennsylvania on November 15, 1919.

== Career ==
Burgo is one of many ballplayers who only appeared in the major leagues during World War II. His debut game was on September 22, 1943, and his last game was on June 11, 1944. He hit 26-for-70, a .371 batting average and next season, batted .239 in 27 games.

Career totals include a batting average of .297, 2 home runs, 12 runs batted in, 18 runs, and a slugging percentage of .399. He made 4 errors in 114 chances (.965).

== Death and interment ==
Burgo died at the age of sixty-nine at his home in Morgan City, Louisiana, on October 19, 1988. Following funeral services at the chapel of the Twin City Funeral Home in Morgan City, he was buried at the Morgan City Cemetery.
