= Jim Mertz =

American baseball player (1916-2003)

- Pitcher
- Born: August 10, 1916; Lima, Ohio, US
- Died: February 4, 2003 (aged 86); Waycross, Georgia, US
- Batted: Right Threw: Right

MLB debut
- May 1, 1943, for the Washington Senators

Last MLB appearance
- October 2, 1943, for the Washington Senators

MLB statistics
- Win–loss record: 5–7
- Earned run average: 4.63
- Strikeouts: 53
- Stats at Baseball Reference

Teams
- Washington Senators (1943)

James Verlin Mertz (August 10, 1916 – February 4, 2003) was an American pitcher in Major League Baseball. He played for the Washington Senators, appearing in 33 games, all during the 1943 season, making ten starts, while notching three saves.
