= Joe Wood (infielder) =

American baseball player (1919–1985)

- Infielder
- Born: October 3, 1919; Houston, Texas
- Died: March 25, 1985 (aged 65); Houston, Texas
- Batted: Switch Threw: Right

MLB debut
- May 2, 1943, for the Detroit Tigers

Last MLB appearance
- October 3, 1943, for the Detroit Tigers

MLB statistics
- Batting average: .323
- Home runs: 1
- Runs batted in: 17
- Stats at Baseball Reference

Teams
- Detroit Tigers (1943)

Joseph Perry Wood (October 3, 1919 – March 25, 1985) was a professional baseball player. He played one season in Major League Baseball for the Detroit Tigers in 1943, playing second base and third base. A native of Houston, Texas, Wood batted and threw right-handed. He attended Rice University.

In one season career, Wood was a .323 hitter (53-for-164) with one home run and 17 RBI in 60 games, including four doubles, four triples and two stolen bases.

Wood died in an accidental fire in his hometown of Houston, Texas, at the age of 65.
