= Frank Doljack =

American baseball player (1907–1948)

- Outfielder
- Born: October 5, 1907; Cleveland, Ohio, U.S.
- Died: January 23, 1948 (aged 40); Cleveland, Ohio, U.S.
- Batted: Right Threw: Right

MLB debut
- September 4, 1930, for the Detroit Tigers

Last MLB appearance
- July 3, 1943, for the Cleveland Indians

MLB statistics
- Batting average: .269
- Home runs: 9
- Runs batted in: 85
- Stats at Baseball Reference

Teams
- Detroit Tigers (1930–1934); Cleveland Indians (1943)

Frank Joseph "Dolie" Doljack (October 5, 1907 – January 23, 1948) was a player in Major League Baseball.

Frank started playing ball on Cleveland sandlots. He won the Babe Ruth Home Run Trophy in Class D in 1928. In 1929, while also playing winter ball in the Coast League, he signed on with the Tigers. He played outfield for the Detroit Tigers in the thirties. He played in the 1934 World Series. Frank also played basketball, was an expert swimmer, and hunted in northern Michigan in the off season. His four brothers all played baseball too. He was a manager for the boxer Lloyd Marshall.

Frank died in 1948 due to a weakened heart from childhood rheumatic fever.

== Sources ==
- Career statistics from Baseball Reference · Retrosheet · Baseball Almanac
