= Tony Parisse =

American baseball player

- Catcher
- Born: June 25, 1911; Philadelphia, Pennsylvania, U.S.
- Died: June 2, 1956 (aged 44); Philadelphia, Pennsylvania, U.S.
- Batted: Right Threw: Right

MLB debut
- September 22, 1943, for the Philadelphia Athletics

Last MLB appearance
- July 1, 1944, for the Philadelphia Athletics

MLB statistics
- Batting average: .143
- Hits: 3
- Runs batted in: 1
- Stats at Baseball Reference

Teams
- Philadelphia Athletics (1943–1944)

Louis Peter "Tony" Parisse (June 25, 1911 – June 2, 1956) was an American professional baseball player and manager. He appeared in ten Major League Baseball games as a catcher and pinch hitter for the 1943–44 Philadelphia Athletics, one of the many players who received their only MLB trials during the World War II manpower shortage. During his six-season career in the minor leagues, he never played above the Class B level

Parisse, a Philadelphia native, didn't begin his professional career until he was almost 28 years old, in 1939. The Athletics summoned him from the Wilmington Blue Rocks in September 1943, and, in his second MLB game, Parisse collected two singles and an RBI in a 9–4 victory over the St. Louis Browns at Shibe Park on September 27. Those would represent two-thirds of his career hit total in the Majors, and his lone run batted in.

He briefly managed in the Chicago White Sox farm system (1947) before leaving the game, and died in Philadelphia at age 44.
