= Ford Garrison =

American baseball player (1915–2001)

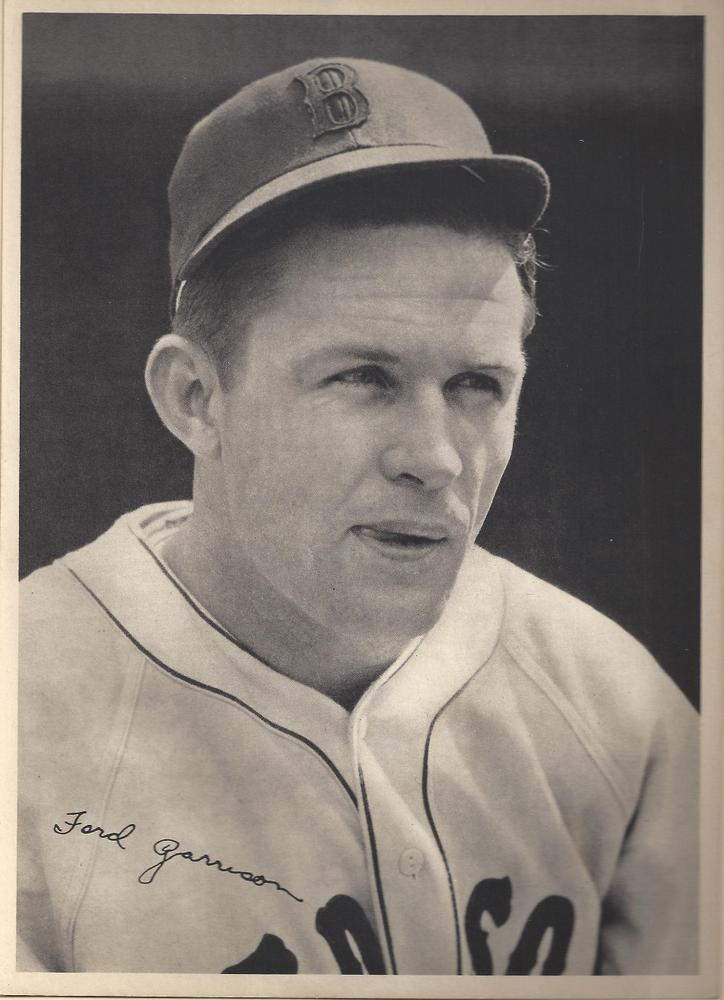
- Outfielder
- Born: August 29, 1915; Greenville, South Carolina, U.S.
- Died: June 6, 2001 (aged 85); Largo, Florida, U.S.
- Batted: Right Threw: Right

MLB debut
- April 22, 1943, for the Boston Red Sox

Last MLB appearance
- April 28, 1946, for the Philadelphia Athletics

MLB statistics
- Batting average: .262
- Home runs: 6
- Runs batted in: 56
- Stats at Baseball Reference

Teams
- Boston Red Sox (1943–1944); Philadelphia Athletics (1944–1946)

Robert Ford Garrison (August 29, 1915 – June 6, 2001), nicknamed "Rocky" and "Snapper", was an American professional baseball player and coach. An outfielder, the native of Greenville, South Carolina, threw and batted right-handed, stood 5 feet 10 inches (1.78 m) tall and weighed 180 pounds (82 kg). He appeared in 185 games in Major League Baseball for the Boston Red Sox (1943–44) and Philadelphia Athletics (1944–46).

== Career ==
Garrison played 1,822 games during a long minor league career (1938–43; 1946–52; 1954–56). The bulk of his Major League playing career took place during World War II — although he missed part of the 1945 season while serving in the United States Navy. His best season was 1944, when he was a regular outfielder for the Athletics after the Red Sox traded him on May 7. In 134 games that year he hit .267 (133-for-498) with four home runs, 39 runs batted in, and 63 runs scored. He tied for tenth in the American League with ten stolen bases and tied for fifth with 19 sacrifice hits.

He played in just six games for the A's in 1945 and in just nine in 1946. In a total of 185 career MLB games, Garrison was 180-for-687 (.262), and 37 walks and two hit by pitches pushed his on-base percentage up to .302. He had six home runs, 56 RBI, and scored 80 runs. He was an above-average defensive outfielder for his era, handling 425 out of 431 chances successfully for a .986 fielding percentage.

His minor league career also was interrupted by one season (1953) as a Major League coach on the staff of Cincinnati Redlegs manager Rogers Hornsby. Hornsby managed Garrison in 1950 when both were with the Beaumont Roughnecks of the Double-A Texas League.

Garrison died at the age of 85 in Largo, Florida.
