= Hank Schmulbach =

American baseball player (1925-2001)

- Pinch runner
- Born: January 17, 1925; East St. Louis, Illinois, U.S.
- Died: May 3, 2001 (aged 76); Belleville, Illinois, U.S.
- Batted: Left Threw: Right

MLB debut
- September 27, 1943, for the St. Louis Browns

Last MLB appearance
- September 27, 1943, for the St. Louis Browns

MLB statistics
- Games played: 1
- At bats: 0
- Runs scored: 1
- Stats at Baseball Reference

Teams
- St. Louis Browns (1943)

Henry Alrives Schmulbach (January 17, 1925 – May 3, 2001) was an American Major League Baseball player who was used as a pinch runner for the St. Louis Browns for one game on September 27, 1943. He attended Washington University in St. Louis, where he played baseball for Washington University Bears.
