= Jerry Priddy =

American baseball player (1919–1980)

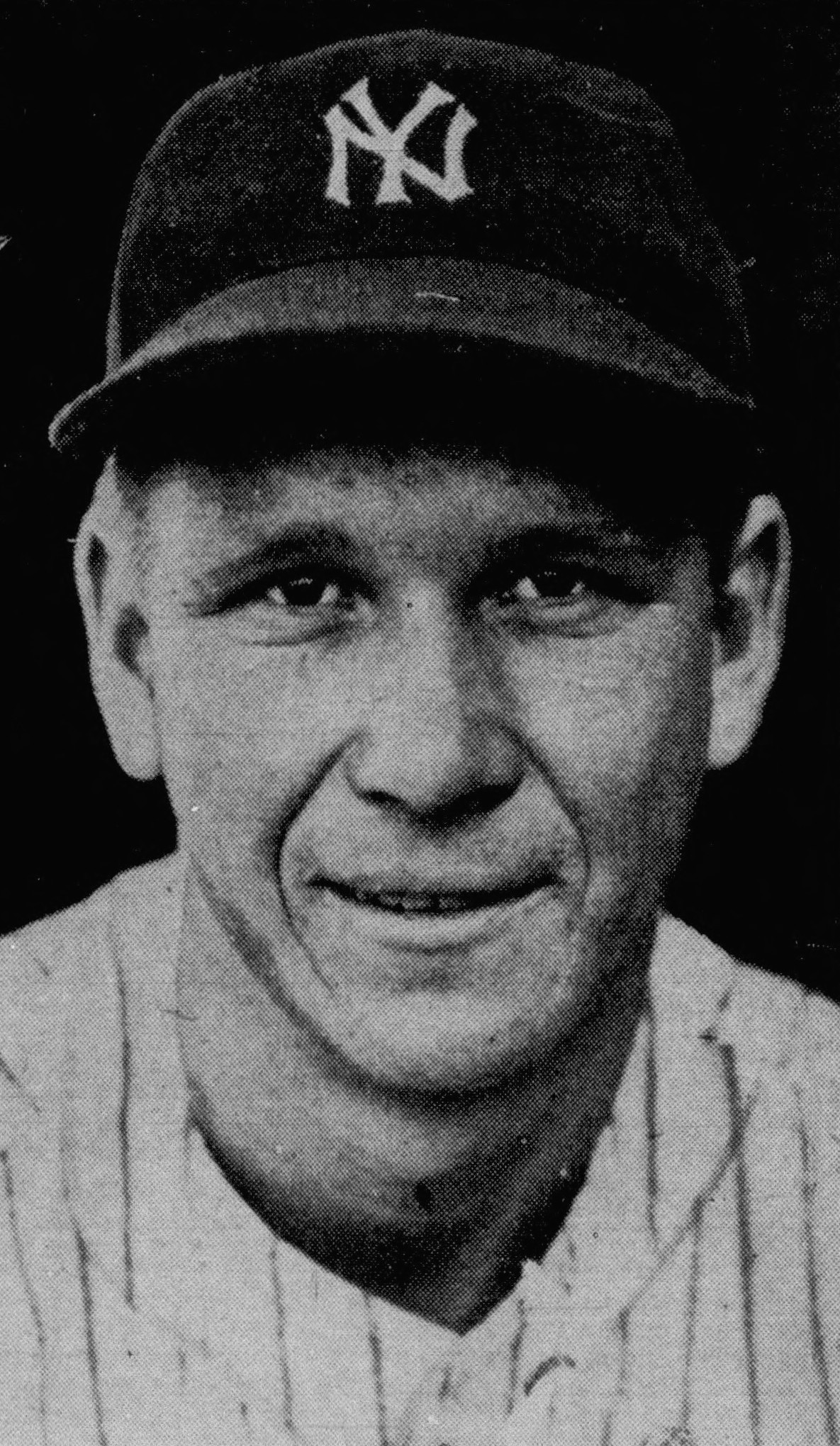
- Priddy, circa 1941–42
- Second baseman
- Born: November 9, 1919; Los Angeles, California, U.S.
- Died: March 3, 1980 (aged 60); North Hollywood, California, U.S.
- Batted: Right Threw: Right

MLB debut
- April 17, 1941, for the New York Yankees

Last MLB appearance
- September 27, 1953, for the Detroit Tigers

MLB statistics
- Batting average: .265
- Home runs: 61
- Runs batted in: 541
- Stats at Baseball Reference

Teams
- New York Yankees (1941–1942); Washington Senators (1943, 1946–1947); St. Louis Browns (1948–1949); Detroit Tigers (1950–1953)

Career highlights and awards
- World Series champion (1941)

Gerald Edward Priddy (November 9, 1919 – March 3, 1980) was an American professional baseball player and a second baseman in Major League Baseball for 11 years. He played for the New York Yankees (1941–1942), Washington Senators (1943, 1946–1947), St. Louis Browns (1948–1949), and Detroit Tigers (1950–1953).

== Minor league career with Phil Rizzuto (1938–1940) ==
Born in Los Angeles, Priddy was signed by the New York Yankees' Southern California scouting chief, Bill Essick. In 1938, Priddy was paired with future Hall of Fame shortstop Phil Rizzuto as a double play combination for three years in the Yankees' minor league organization. In 1938, Priddy and Rizzuto played beside each other on the Norfolk Tars championship team.

The following year, they were promoted together to the American Association's Kansas City Blues. With Priddy, Rizzuto, and Vince DiMaggio, the 1939 Blues went 107–47 and have been ranked as the 12th best minor league team of all-time. Rizzuto and the 19-year-old Priddy were two of the league's best players in 1939. Priddy hit .333 with 24 home runs and 107 RBIs, leading the American Association with 44 doubles (44); he was second in hits (193), total bases (339), and triples (15), third in batting average, and fourth in RBIs. He also led the league's second basemen in putouts (372), assists (456), and double plays (126).

By 1940, the exploits of Priddy and Rizzuto drew attention in New York as the Yankees' double play combination of the future. Mel Allen gave regular reports about their performance in Kansas City during his New York radio broadcasts. Allen predicted they would become "the best the Yankees ever had." That season, Priddy batted .306 with 38 doubles, 10 triples, and 16 home runs, while Rizzuto was named the league MVP for his play.

Rizzuto recalled Priddy as: "That huckleberry. He was something else. We were close even though we were opposites in a lot of ways. He was cocky.... oh he was sure of himself. Me, on the other hand, I was shy and always worried. He took me under his wing, but he loved playing tricks on me too.... like nailing my shoes to the floor, ripping up all my fan letters, all those things."

One book states that Priddy played in the late 1930s with Babe Herman's All Stars, a touring team that staged exhibitions against all-stars from the Negro leagues. Charlie Biot, an outfielder who played against Priddy, recalled in old age how impressive a ballplayer Priddy was in those games.

== New York Yankees (1941–1942) ==
When spring training arrived in 1941, Yankee manager Joe McCarthy announced that Rizzuto and Priddy would start at shortstop and second base, with Joe Gordon moving to first base to make room for Priddy. McCarthy said, "We don't want to break up Rizzuto and Priddy, so my plan is to move Gordon to first base." After McCarthy announced his plan, Priddy reportedly walked up to the future Hall of Famer Gordon and told him, "I'm the better second baseman. I can make the double play better than you. ... do everything better than you."

On April 14, 1941, Time magazine wrote: "Last year these Keystone Kids led Kansas City to its second consecutive pennant and set a new league record for double plays: 130. Both are extraordinary hitters, extraordinary fielders."

By the middle of May, Priddy was batting only .204, and McCarthy benched him, putting Gordon back at second base. Rizzuto recalled that Priddy's disrespect of Gordon got him off to a rocky start with the Yankee veterans. As a result, Priddy got no sympathy when he failed to live up to expectations and his own cocky predictions.

In 1941, Priddy batted only .213 in 56 games, while Gordon hit 24 home runs and scored 104 runs. In 1942, matters got worse for Priddy, as they got better for Gordon. Gordon hit .322 with 103 RBIs and was named the American League's Most Valuable Player. Priddy played in only 59 games in 1942, mostly at third base, and only eight games at his natural second base spot. He also fought with manager Joe McCarthy, and during the winter of 1942–1943, Priddy complained publicly about his lack of playing time, saying that he was being "wasted" by the Yankees. He also asked to be traded.

== Washington Senators and World War II (1943–1947) ==
On January 29, 1943, Priddy was traded with Milo Candini to the Washington Senators for Bill Zuber and cash. That year, Priddy was the Senators' starting second baseman. He batted .271 with 31 doubles, 67 walks, and 62 runs scored; he finished 16th in the AL MVP voting.

Priddy entered the Army in December 1943 and was not discharged until January 1946. When he returned in 1946, Priddy's average dropped to .254 and then dropped even further to .214 in 1947. As had been the case in New York, Priddy did not get along with the Senators' manager, Ossie Bluege. Washington Post sports columnist following the trade said that Priddy with his fading talent didn't take his baseball career seriously enough to satisfy his disappointed managers.

== Inspiration for Maury Wills ==
While playing for the Senators in 1943, Priddy met an 11-year-old Maury Wills. Wills later recalled that the Senators had sent Priddy to help with a playground baseball clinic in the African-American section of Washington. Wills recalled, "It was the very first time I had ever looked a white guy in the eyes." Wills was impressed that Priddy didn't just stay for 15 minutes and leave. "The man talked to us for at least two hours, and I just couldn't believe it. Priddy even singled me out. He told the other kids to move back and said, 'Watch this kid.' He bounced a grounder to me, and I got my little feet in place, grabbed the ball, and I took a little hop – just like the guys I'd seen playing on Sundays. I threw it overhand to him, and the ball made a loud pop in his mitt. I still remember what he said: 'Wow!'" Priddy looked down at Wills' feet and said, "Hey, kid, you've got a chance to be a good baseball player one day. Where's your shoes?" Wills recalled he was barefoot.

== St. Louis Browns (1948–1949) ==
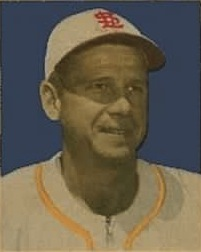
Priddy's 1949 Bowman Gum baseball card

On November 22, 1947, the Senators traded Priddy to the St. Louis Browns for Johnny Berardino‚ but Berardino announced he was retiring to devote himself to his movie career. Commissioner Happy Chandler cancelled the trade, and Berardino then un-retired. Priddy ended up with the Browns anyway, as the Senators sold him to the Browns for $25‚000 on December 8, 1947.

Priddy had two strong seasons for St. Louis. In 1948, he hit .296 with a .391 on-base percentage and led the AL's second basemen in putouts, assists, double plays, and chances per game. He was 16th in the 1948 AL MVP voting. He had another good year in 1949, batting .290 with a .382 on-base percentage and finishing 22nd in the AL MVP voting.

The Browns' attendance dropped to 270,000 in 1949 (compared with more than 2 million in New York and Cleveland), and the team was forced to sell their best players to raise $200,000 to make ends meet. On December 14, 1949, the Browns traded Priddy to the Detroit Tigers for Lou Kretlow and $100,000.

== Detroit Tigers (1950–1953) ==
In 1950, Priddy played a career- and AL-high 157 games, all at second base, for Detroit. He hit .277 with a .376 on-base percentage, 13 home runs, and 75 RBIs; he was among the AL leaders with 104 runs scored (10th), 95 walks (7th), 126 singles (7th), 253 times on base (10th), 13 sacrifice hits (6th), and 618 at-bats (4th). He finished 17th in the 1950 AL MVP voting. Priddy led the league in games played again in 1951, but his offensive output dropped to 73 runs scored, 22 doubles, 8 home runs, and 57 RBIs.

In July 1952, Priddy was injured while sliding into home plate, ending his season. He appeared in 65 games in 1953, and the Tigers released him in October. Priddy played his last major league game on September 27, 1953.

== MLB career overview ==
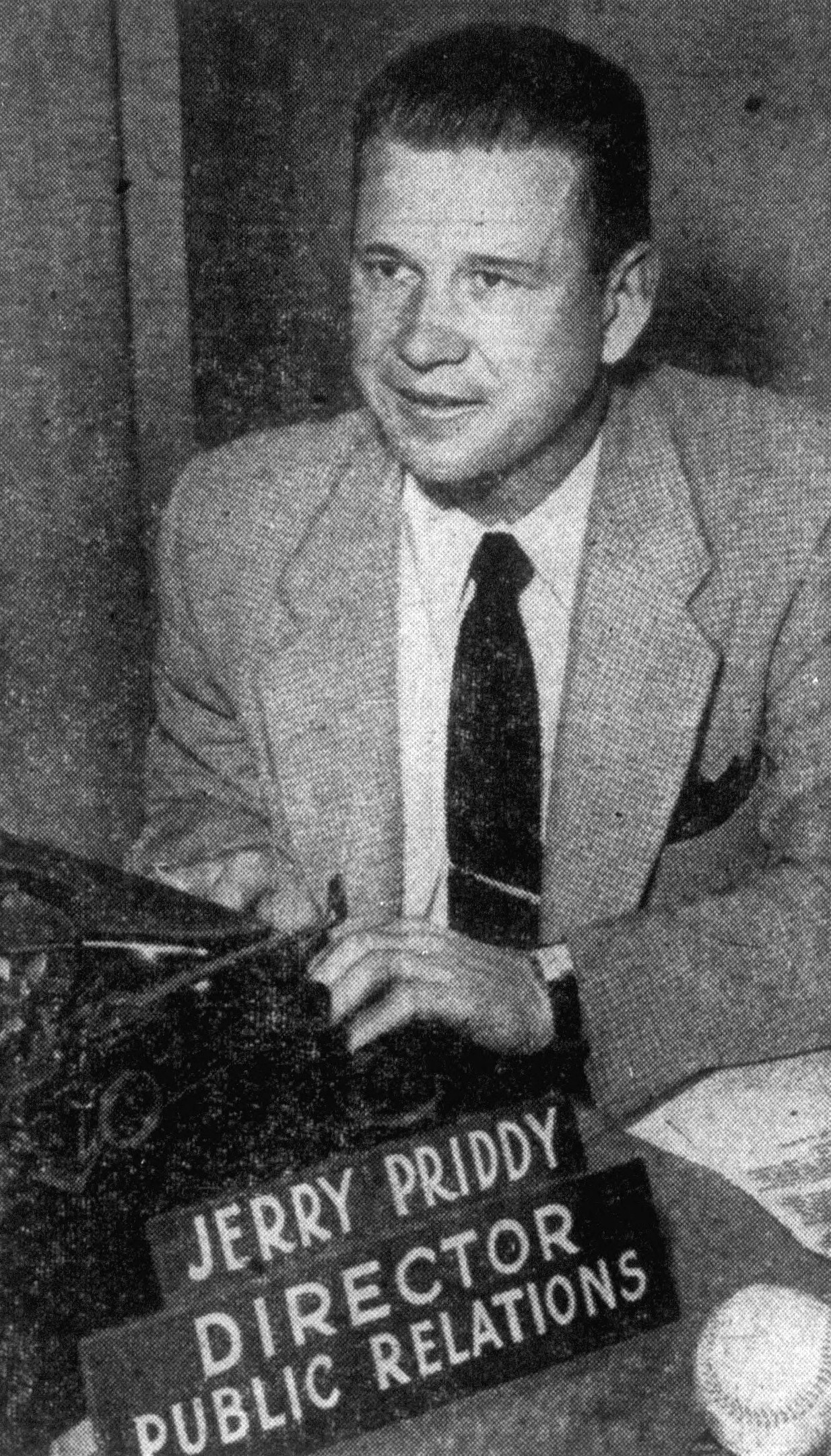
Priddy in January 1954 during his time as public relations director at Pacific Gauge Company in Los Angeles, California.

Priddy appeared in 1,296 major league baseball games. He had a career batting average of .265 with 1,252 hits, 612 runs scored, 541 RBIs, 232 doubles, 624 walks, 639 strikeouts, and 61 home runs. Defensively, he recorded a .973 fielding percentage playing at all four infield positions.

Phil Rizzuto later said of Priddy's playing career: "I'll never understand what happened with him, other than bad luck and some injuries. Jerry was a better player than I was. He had more power and could play the heck out of second base."

Baseball historian Bill James wrote an entire chapter about Priddy in his book The Politics of Glory. He concluded that Priddy hit relatively well, was one of the greatest defensive players in history, and had "essentially the same skills as Mazeroski and Bolling." In 2001, James ranked Priddy as the 73rd best second baseman of all time.

== Later life ==
Priddy returned to the minor leagues after the 1953 season to play and manage for a few more years. He later tried his hand as a professional golfer with little success.

On June 6, 1973, Priddy was arrested by the FBI in California and charged with trying to extort $250,000 from Princess Cruises by threatening to put a bomb aboard one of its vessels, the Island Princess. He was convicted and sentenced to nine months in prison, served at Federal Correctional Institution, Terminal Island. Rizzuto later said that he could never believe "that whole extortion thing." He said: "That wasn't the Gerry I knew. He was outspoken and hotheaded ... but outside of baseball he was a regular guy. He knew a lot of prominent businesspeople. It just didn't make sense. He called me when he got out of prison and told me if he'd have to spend one more day in there he'd have been a hardened criminal."

In 1980, Priddy died of a heart attack at his home in North Hollywood, California while suing his bank for seizing his assets during his prison stint.

== See also ==
- List of Detroit Tigers team records
- List of Major League Baseball career putouts as a second baseman leaders
