= Ed Busch =

American baseball player (1917-1987)

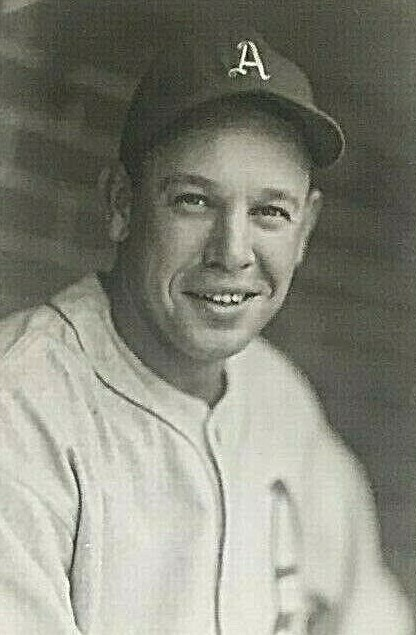
- Shortstop
- Born: November 16, 1917; Lebanon, Illinois, US
- Died: January 17, 1987 (aged 69); St. Clair County, Illinois, US
- Batted: Right Threw: Right

MLB debut
- September 30, 1943, for the Philadelphia Athletics

Last MLB appearance
- September 27, 1945, for the Philadelphia Athletics

MLB statistics
- Batting average: .262
- Home runs: 0
- Runs batted in: 75
- Stats at Baseball Reference

Teams
- Philadelphia Athletics (1943–1945)

Edgar John Busch (November 16, 1917 – January 17, 1987) was an American shortstop who played in Major League Baseball between the 1943 and 1945 seasons. Listed at 5 ft 10 in (1.78 m), 175 lb, Busch batted and threw right-handed. He was born in Lebanon, Illinois.

== Career ==
Busch started his professional career in 1938 in the St. Louis Browns minor league system, playing for them five years before being released in 1942. He was signed by the Philadelphia Athletics organization in 1943, when the military draft was depleting Major League rosters of first-line players due to World War II. He joined the big team in late September of that year.

A slick shortstop with good hands and a strong throwing arm, Busch was part of an infield that included Dick Siebert at first base, Irv Hall at second and George Kell at third. He was the starting shortstop for Philadelphia in 1944 and 1945, until Pete Suder returned to the team when the war ended.

In a 270-game career, Busch posted a .262 average (240-for-917), including 80 runs, 10 doubles, three triples, 75 RBI, seven stolen bases, and a .311 on-base percentage. In six minor league seasons, he hit .283 with 13 home runs in 737 games.

Busch died in St. Clair County, Illinois, at the age of 69.

== Sources ==
- Career statistics from Baseball Reference · Baseball Reference (Minors) · Retrosheet · Baseball Almanac
