= Ken Sears (baseball) =

American baseball player (1917-1968)

- Catcher
- Born: July 6, 1917; Streator, Illinois, U.S.
- Died: July 17, 1968 (aged 51); Bridgeport, Texas, U.S.
- Batted: Left Threw: Right

MLB debut
- May 2, 1943, for the New York Yankees

Last MLB appearance
- July 3, 1946, for the St. Louis Browns

MLB statistics
- Batting average: .282
- Home runs: 2
- Runs batted in: 23
- Stats at Baseball Reference

Teams
- New York Yankees (1943); St. Louis Browns (1946)

Kenneth Eugene Sears (July 6, 1917 – July 17, 1968) was an American professional baseball catcher who played in Major League Baseball (MLB) during the 1943 and 1946 seasons. He played with the New York Yankees and the St. Louis Browns. He had a .282 career batting average in 67 career games and batted left and threw right-handed. He played college baseball at the University of Alabama.

He played in the minor leagues for 8 seasons with the Amsterdam Rugmakers, Norfolk Tars, Newark Bears, Kansas City Blues, San Antonio Missions, Little Rock Travelers and Borger Gassers.

Sears was the son of Ziggy Sears, an MLB umpire.
