= Jim Tyack =

American baseball player (1911-1995)

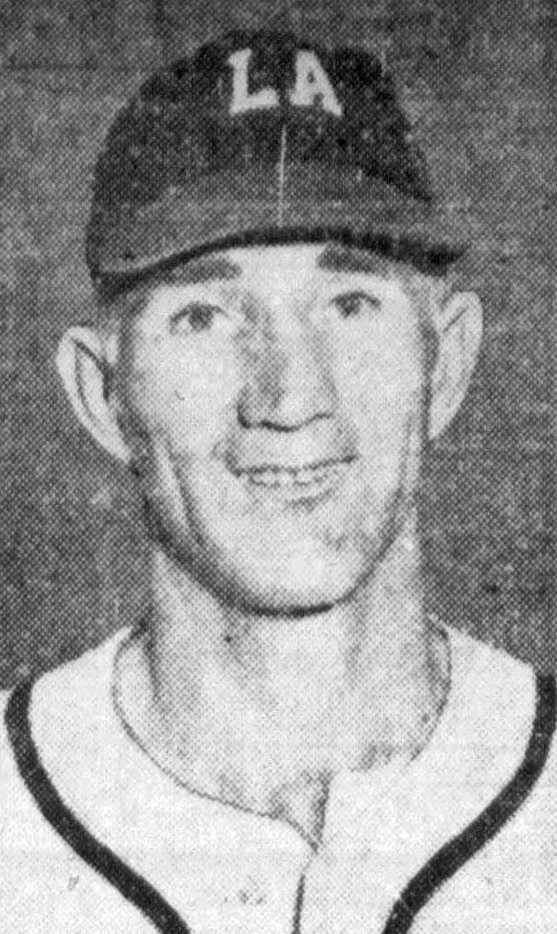
- Tyack, circa 1945
- Outfielder
- Born: January 9, 1911; Florence, Montana
- Died: January 3, 1995 (aged 83); Bakersfield, California
- Batted: Left Threw: Right

MLB debut
- April 20, 1943, for the Philadelphia Athletics

Last MLB appearance
- August 1, 1943, for the Philadelphia Athletics

MLB statistics
- Batting average: .258
- Home runs: 0
- Runs batted in: 23
- Stats at Baseball Reference

Teams
- Philadelphia Athletics (1943)

James Frederick Tyack (January 9, 1911 – January 3, 1995) was a Major League Baseball outfielder who played in 54 games for the Philadelphia Athletics, all during the 1943 season. He was born in Florence, Montana.
