= Jimmy Grant =

American baseball player (1918–1970)

- Third baseman
- Born: October 6, 1918; Racine, Wisconsin, U.S.
- Died: July 8, 1970 (aged 51); Rochester, Minnesota, U.S.
- Batted: Left Threw: Right

MLB debut
- September 8, 1942, for the Chicago White Sox

Last MLB appearance
- September 9, 1944, for the Cleveland Indians

MLB statistics
- Batting average: .246
- Home runs: 5
- Runs batted in: 36
- Stats at Baseball Reference

Teams
- Chicago White Sox (1942–1943); Cleveland Indians (1943–1944)

James Charles Grant (October 6, 1918 – July 8, 1970) was an American professional baseball third baseman who played in Major League Baseball for three seasons. He played for the Chicago White Sox from 1942 to 1943 and the Cleveland Indians from 1943 to 1944.
