= Willard Mains =

American baseball player (1868–1923)

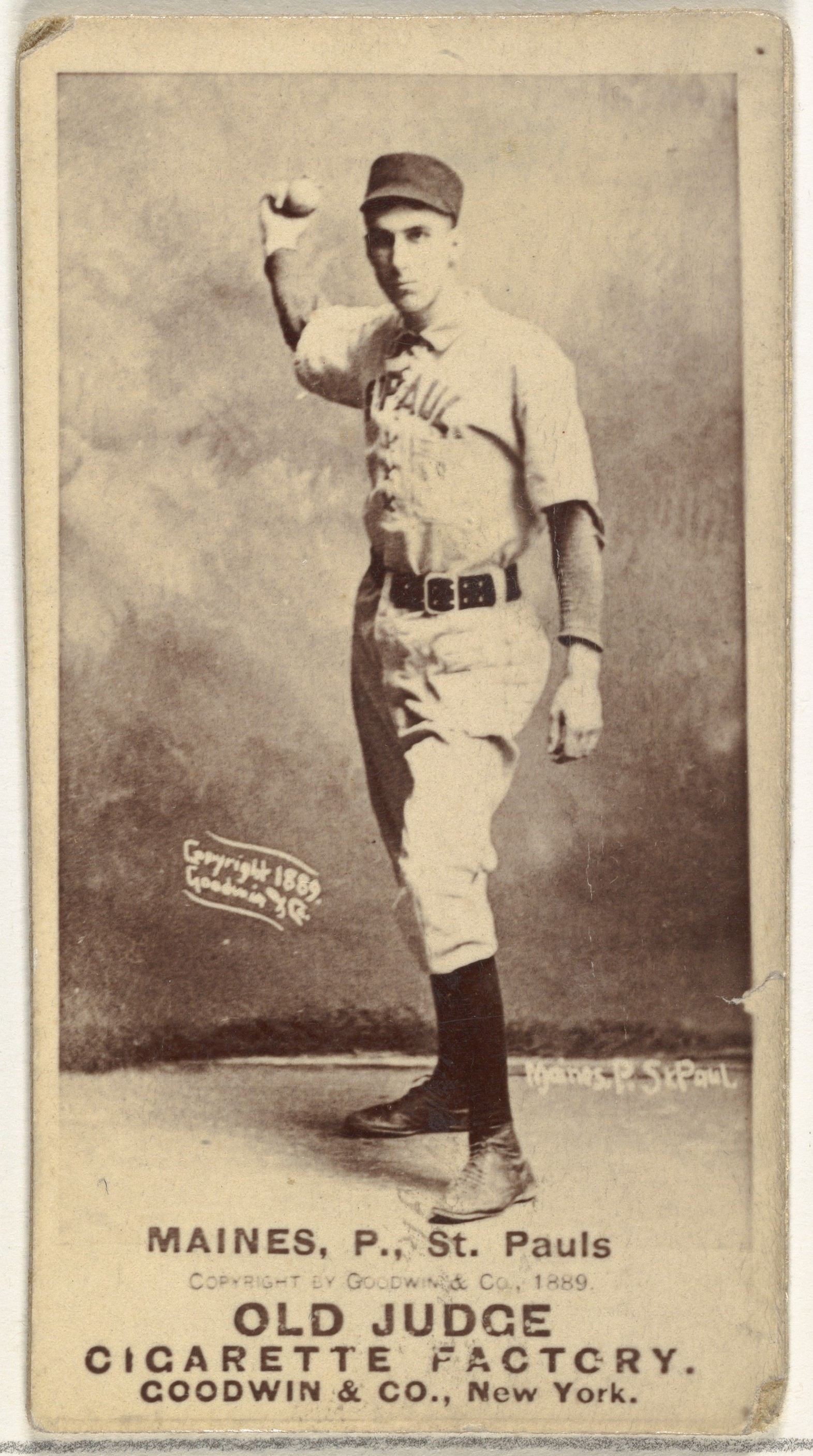
- 1889 baseball card of Mains
- Pitcher
- Born: July 7, 1868; North Windham, Maine, U.S.
- Died: May 23, 1923 (aged 54); Bridgton, Maine, U.S.
- Batted: Left Threw: Right

MLB debut
- August 3, 1888, for the Chicago White Stockings

Last MLB appearance
- June 2, 1896, for the Boston Beaneaters

MLB statistics
- Win–loss record: 16–17
- Earned run average: 3.53
- Strikeouts: 96
- Stats at Baseball Reference

Teams
- Chicago White Stockings (1888); Cincinnati Kelly's Killers (1891); Milwaukee Brewers (1891); Boston Beaneaters (1896)

Willard Eben Mains (July 7, 1868 – May 23, 1923) was an American professional baseball pitcher. He joined the National League at the age of 20 with the Chicago White Stockings and started two games in 1888, winning one and losing the other. After that season, he did not return to the majors until 1891, when he pitched in 30 games, starting 23 of them, for the Cincinnati Kelly's Killers of the American Association. He had a record of 12–12 with 20 complete games before he moved on and pitched two games for the Milwaukee Brewers, also of the Association. He was not seen in the major leagues again until five years later when he surfaced for the 1896 Boston Beaneaters, with whom he pitched in eight games, winning three and losing two. His son Jim Mains pitched one game in the majors for the 1943 Philadelphia Athletics.

Willard Mains had a long career in minor league baseball, where he had a record of 318 wins and 179 losses in 545 games. He died at the age of 54 in Bridgton, Maine, and was interred at South High Street Cemetery in Bridgton.
