= Tom Clyde =

American baseball player

- Pitcher
- Born: August 17, 1923; Wachapreague, Virginia, US
- Died: October 1, 2005 (aged 82); Dallas, Texas, US
- Batted: Right Threw: Right

MLB debut
- May 31, 1943, for the Philadelphia Athletics

Last MLB appearance
- August 1, 1943, for the Philadelphia Athletics

MLB statistics (through 1943)
- Win–loss record: 0–0
- Earned run average: 9.00
- Strikeouts: 0
- WHIP: 1.833
- Stats at Baseball Reference

Teams
- Philadelphia Athletics (1943)

Thomas Knox Clyde (August 17, 1923 – October 1, 2005) was an American Major League Baseball pitcher. He played for the Philadelphia Athletics during the 1943 season.
