= Norm Brown (baseball) =

American baseball player (1919–1995)

- Pitcher
- Born: February 1, 1919; Evergreen, North Carolina, U.S.
- Died: May 31, 1995 (aged 76); Bennettsville, South Carolina, U.S.
- Batted: Both Threw: Right

MLB debut
- October 3, 1943, for the Philadelphia Athletics

Last MLB appearance
- May 11, 1946, for the Philadelphia Athletics

MLB statistics
- Win–loss record: 0–1
- Earned run average: 3.14
- Strikeouts: 4
- Stats at Baseball Reference

Teams
- Philadelphia Athletics (1943, 1946)

Norman Ladelle Brown (February 1, 1919 – May 31, 1995) was an American professional baseball player. He was a right-handed pitcher over parts of two seasons (1943, 1946) with the Philadelphia Athletics. For his career, he compiled a record of 0–1, with a 3.14 earned run average, and four strikeouts in 14⅓ innings pitched. Between his stints with the A's, Brown served in the United States Army 1944–1945 during World War II, achieving the rank of TEC-5.
