= Lew Carpenter (baseball) =

American baseball player (1913–1979)

- Pitcher
- Born: August 16, 1913; Woodstock, Georgia, U.S.
- Died: April 25, 1979 (aged 65); Marietta, Georgia, U.S.
- Batted: Right Threw: Right

MLB debut
- May 1, 1943, for the Washington Senators

Last MLB appearance
- May 9, 1943, for the Washington Senators

MLB statistics
- Win–loss record: 0–0
- Earned run average: 0.00
- Strikeouts: 1
- Stats at Baseball Reference

Teams
- Washington Senators (1943)

Lewis Emmett Carpenter (August 16, 1913 – April 25, 1979) was an American professional baseball player. He was a right-handed pitcher who made four appearances during the 1943 season for the Washington Senators, recording no decisions and allowing no earned runs in 3⅓ innings pitched.

An alumnus of the Georgia Institute of Technology, Carpenter was born in Woodstock, Georgia and died in Marietta, Georgia at the age of 65. He is buried in Dawson Cemetery in Cobb County, Georgia.
