= Jim Mains =

American baseball player (1922-1969)

- Pitcher
- Born: June 12, 1922; Bridgton, Maine
- Died: March 17, 1969 (aged 46); Portland, Maine
- Batted: Right Threw: Right

MLB debut
- August 22, 1943, for the Philadelphia Athletics

Last MLB appearance
- August 22, 1943, for the Philadelphia Athletics

MLB statistics
- Win–loss record: 0-1
- Earned run average: 5.63
- Strikeouts: 4
- Stats at Baseball Reference

Teams
- Philadelphia Athletics (1943)

James Royal Mains (June 12, 1922 – March 17, 1969) was a pitcher in Major League Baseball. He played one game for the Philadelphia Athletics in 1943.

== Biography ==
Mains was born in Bridgton, Maine, and was the son of former MLB pitcher Willard Mains. He attended Harvard University and played on the freshman baseball team in 1942.

Mains started his professional baseball career in 1943. That season, he pitched for the Eastern League's Utica Braves and went 0–8 with a 6.64 earned run average. He also made one start for the Philadelphia Athletics late in the season, a complete-game loss. It was his only major league appearance. The following season, he went 3–9 back in the Eastern League.

In 1945, Mains pitched for the American Association's Toledo Mud Hens and went 5–8, mostly in relief. He then moved on to the Little Rock Travelers of the Southern Association. He set career-highs in 1946 in wins, losses, and innings pitched, going 6–16 with a 4.60 ERA in 178 innings. In 1947, he went 3–10. That was his last season in the high minors. He later pitched in the Provincial League.

Besides playing baseball, Mains also manufactured baseball bats in Bridgton. He had one son, who is also named Jim.

Mains died in 1969, at the age of 46.
