= Johnny Welaj =

American baseball player (1914-2003)

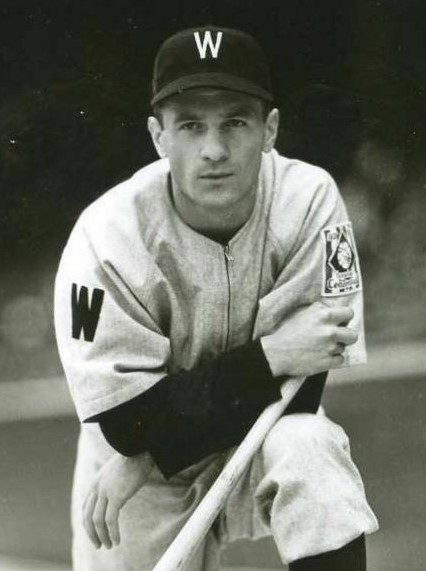
- Outfielder
- Born: May 27, 1914; Moss Creek, Pennsylvania, US
- Died: September 13, 2003 (aged 89); Arlington, Texas, US
- Batted: Right Threw: Right

MLB debut
- May 2, 1939, for the Washington Senators

Last MLB appearance
- September 27, 1943, for the Philadelphia Athletics

MLB statistics
- Batting average: .250
- Home runs: 4
- Runs batted in: 74
- Stats at Baseball Reference

Teams
- Washington Senators (1939–1941); Philadelphia Athletics (1943)

John Ludwig Welaj (May 27, 1914 – September 13, 2003), pronounced "Weli," according to newspapers of the 1930s, was an American professional baseball outfielder and executive. He played in Major League Baseball (MLB) for four seasons between 1939 and 1943 for the Washington Senators and Philadelphia Athletics. Welaj (pronounced WELL-eye, according to a twenty-first-century source) was a native of Barr Township, Cambria County, Pennsylvania, who threw and batted right-handed and was listed as 6 feet (1.8 m) tall and 164 pounds (74 kg).

== Playing career ==
In 200 games played for Washington (1939–1941) and 93 for Philadelphia (1943), Welaj collected 198 hits, with 40 doubles, three triples, four home runs and 74 runs batted in. He batted .250 lifetime in 793 at bats.

Welaj also had an extensive minor league career, spanning 21 seasons from 1936 to 1956. In 1955, he served as manager of the Hagerstown Packets in the Senators' organization. He was a player-manager of the Erie Senators in 1956, then returned to full-time managing with the Midland/Lamesa Indians in 1957.

== Executive career ==
After 1957, Welaj served in the front offices of both of Washington's 20th century American League franchises. He worked in sales and promotions for the 1901–1960 Senators, until they left the U.S. capital to become the Minnesota Twins. Welaj then performed similar duties for the expansion Senators of 1961–1971. But when that franchise ended in Washington and relocated to Dallas–Fort Worth, as the Texas Rangers in 1972, Welaj went with them. From 1973 until 1984, he served as the Rangers' director of stadium operations, after which he retired as a full-time employee at age 70. However, he continued to serve as the Rangers' spring training director until 1999.

== Death and interment ==
Welaj died at the age of eighty-nine in Arlington, Texas on September 14, 2003.

== Sources ==
- Career statistics from Baseball Reference · Baseball Reference (Minors) · Retrosheet · Baseball Almanac
