= Vern Curtis =

American baseball player

- Pitcher
- Born: May 24, 1920; Cairo, Illinois, U.S.
- Died: June 24, 1992 (aged 72); Cairo, Illinois, U.S.
- Batted: Right Threw: Right

MLB debut
- September 6, 1943, for the Washington Senators

Last MLB appearance
- September 13, 1946, for the Washington Senators

MLB statistics
- Win–loss record: 0–1
- Strikeouts: 10
- Earned run average: 5.70
- Stats at Baseball Reference

Teams
- Washington Senators (1943–1944, 1946)

Vernon Eugene Curtis (May 24, 1920 – June 24, 1992), nicknamed "Turk", was an American professional baseball pitcher. A right-hander, he appeared in 11 games over parts of three seasons in Major League Baseball for the Washington Senators (1943–1944 and 1946). Curtis served in the United States Navy in 1945, the final year of World War II.

Born in Cairo, Illinois, Curtis was listed as 6 feet (1.8 m) tall and 170 pounds (77 kg). He began his pro baseball career in 1942, and was called to the Senators in September 1943 for his first MLB trial. In his 11 games with Washington, spread over three seasons, he posted a 0–1 record and a 5.70 earned run average; he allowed 30 hits and 19 bases on balls in 30 full innings pitched, with ten strikeouts. In his only starting pitcher assignment, on September 24, 1944, he pitched creditably against his "hometown" Chicago White Sox at Comiskey Park, permitting only five hits and two earned runs in seven innings pitched. But Washington was shut out by Eddie Lopat and fell 2–0. The loss was Curtis' only big-league decision. He left baseball after the 1948 minor-league season.
