= Red Barbary =

American baseball player (1920-2003)

- Pinch hitter
- Born: June 20, 1920; Simpsonville, South Carolina, U.S.
- Died: September 27, 2003 (aged 83); Simpsonville, South Carolina, U.S.
- Batted: Right Threw: Right

MLB debut
- May 22, 1943, for the Washington Senators

Last MLB appearance
- May 22, 1943, for the Washington Senators

MLB statistics
- Games played: 1
- At bats: 1
- Hits: 0
- Stats at Baseball Reference

Teams
- Washington Senators (1943)

Donald Odell "Red" Barbary (June 20, 1920 – September 27, 2003) was an American Major League Baseball player who pinch hit in one game for the Washington Senators om May 22, 1943. He went 0–1 in his only career at bat.
