= Ox Miller =

American baseball player (1915–2007)

- Pitcher
- Born: May 4, 1915; Gause, Texas, U.S.
- Died: August 13, 2007 (aged 92); Beeville, Texas, U.S.
- Batted: Right Threw: Right

MLB debut
- August 7, 1943, for the Washington Senators

Last MLB appearance
- September 18, 1947, for the Chicago Cubs

MLB statistics
- Win–loss record: 4–6
- Earned run average: 6.38
- Strikeouts: 26
- Stats at Baseball Reference

Teams
- Washington Senators (1943); St. Louis Browns (1943, 1945–1946); Chicago Cubs (1947)

John Anthony "Ox" Miller (May 4, 1915 – August 13, 2007) was an American professional baseball pitcher. He played parts of four seasons in Major League Baseball, between 1943 and 1947, for the Washington Senators (1943), St. Louis Browns (1943, 1945–46) and Chicago Cubs (1947). Listed at 6 ft 1 in (1.85 m), 190 lb (86 kg), he batted and threw right-handed.

Born in Gause, Texas, Miller posted a 4–6 record with 27 strikeouts and a 6.38 ERA in 24 appearances, including 10 starts, four complete games, and 91 2/3 innings pitched.

Miller served in the United States Army in late 1944 and early 1945. After spending most of the 1947 season with Double-A San Antonio, Miller had his contract purchased by the Chicago Cubs at the beginning of September. The Cubs thought Miller could improve their finish in the standings. Miller made four starts for the Cubs that September, posting a 1–2 record and a 10.13 ERA. In his final outing of the year, on September 18, he gave up seven runs in 4 2/3 innings, taking the loss in a 9–5 defeat by the New York Giants. In sixth place with a 57–71 record before acquiring Miller, the Cubs finished the season in sixth place, with 69 wins and 85 losses, plus one tie.

After concluding his playing career, Miller worked as a rural letter carrier in George West, Texas.
