= Ossie Bluege =

American baseball player and manager (1900-1985)

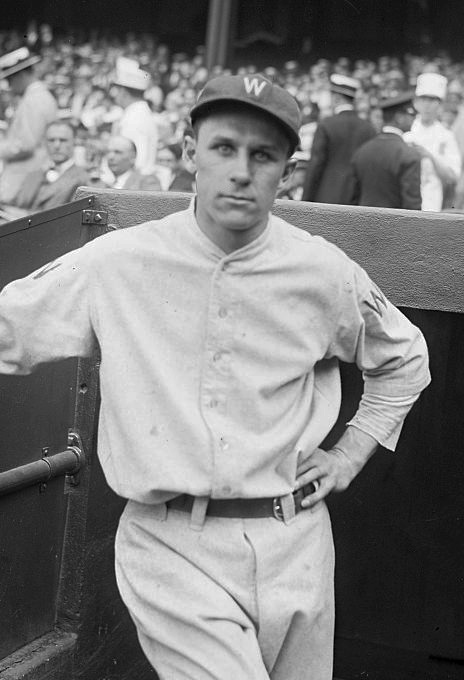
- Third baseman / Manager
- Born: October 24, 1900; Chicago, Illinois, U.S.
- Died: October 14, 1985 (aged 84); Edina, Minnesota, U.S.
- Batted: Right Threw: Right

MLB debut
- April 24, 1922, for the Washington Senators

Last MLB appearance
- July 13, 1939, for the Washington Senators

MLB statistics
- Batting average: .272
- Home runs: 43
- Runs batted in: 848
- Managerial record: 375–394
- Winning %: .488
- Stats at Baseball Reference

Teams
- As player: Washington Senators (1922–1939); As manager: Washington Senators (1943–1947)

Career highlights and awards
- All-Star (1935); World Series champion (1924)

Oswald Louis Bluege (/ˈbluːɡiː/; October 24, 1900 – October 14, 1985) was an American third baseman, manager, coach and front-office executive in Major League Baseball who spent his entire playing career with the Washington Senators franchise from 1922 to 1939. He would remain on the team's payroll in key on- and off-field capacities until 1971, long after it became the Minnesota Twins. Bluege was the last surviving member of the Senators' 1924 World Series championship team, the franchise's only world champion before it relocated to Minnesota in 1961. He threw and batted right-handed, stood 5 feet 11 inches (1.80 m) tall and weighed 162 pounds (73 kg).

== Early life ==
Bluege was born in Chicago and raised in the city's Goose Island area. A younger brother, Otto, an infielder, played in 109 games for the 1932–1933 Cincinnati Reds and had a 13-year playing career in professional baseball. Ossie Bluege, a graduate of the Luther Institute of Business Administration in 1915, found a job as an accountant at International Harvester. He honed his baseball skills as a member of local sandlot teams.

== Playing career ==
Bluege was discovered by baseball promoter Joe Engel, who operated the Chattanooga Lookouts of the Southern Association and scouted for Washington owner Clark Griffith. He made his Major League debut on April 24, 1922, and played his final game on July 13, 1939, spending his 18-year, 1,867-game playing career with the Senators. In addition to the 1924 world champions, Bluege also was the team's starting third baseman for its pennant-winning 1925 and 1933 editions. Bluege was chiefly known for his defensive ability, leading American League third basemen in double plays in three different seasons. His moonlighting, off-season job earned him the nickname "The Accountant" from teammates. Bluege's only All-Star appearance, in 1935, came in a year which saw him primarily play shortstop for Washington.

In his 18-year major league career, spanning 1,867 games, Bleuge posted a .272 batting average (1,751-for-6,440) with 883 runs, 276 doubles, 67 triples, 43 home runs, 848 RBI, 140 stolen bases, 723 base on balls, .352 on-base percentage and .356 slugging percentage. He finished his career with a .961 fielding percentage. In 17 games played during his three World Series, he hit .200 (12-for-60) with five runs scored and five runs batted in.

== Coach, manager, executive ==
After retiring in 1939, Bluege coached for Washington (1940–1942) before taking over as manager of the Senators from 1943 through 1947. He compiled a career managerial record of 379–394, with two second-place finishes (in 1943 and 1945). In 1948, Bluege was named the club's farm system director, where his greatest scouting coup was a young Harmon Killebrew. In 1958 he became the Senators' comptroller—the team's chief accountant—shortly before the club's relocation to Minneapolis–Saint Paul as the Minnesota Twins. He remained the Twins' comptroller until his retirement in 1971, having served the organization for 50 years.

Bluege died of a stroke in 1985 in Edina, Minnesota, ten days before his 85th birthday. The previous week, he had attended a ceremony in Washington, D.C., at halftime of a Washington Redskins football game, where Bluege was honored by being inducted in the Washington stadium's "Hall of Stars". He was buried in Lakewood Cemetery.

== See also ==
- List of Major League Baseball players who spent their entire career with one franchise
