= Irv Hall =

American baseball player (1918-2006)

- Second baseman / Shortstop
- Born: October 7, 1918; Alberton, Maryland, U.S.
- Died: December 12, 2006 (aged 88); Baltimore, Maryland, U.S.
- Batted: Right Threw: Right

MLB debut
- April 20, 1943, for the Philadelphia Athletics

Last MLB appearance
- July 26, 1946, for the Philadelphia Athletics

MLB statistics
- Batting average: .261
- Triples: 19
- Runs batted in: 168
- Stats at Baseball Reference

Teams
- Philadelphia Athletics (1943–1946)

Irvin Gladstone Hall (October 7, 1918 – December 12, 2006) was an American professional baseball player from Alberton, Maryland. He played four seasons in Major League Baseball, 1943–1946, for the Philadelphia Athletics. In his four seasons as a second baseman and shortstop, Hall had 496 hits in 1,904 at bats for a .261 batting average over 787 games. While Hall hit 58 doubles and 19 triples during his career, none of his major league hits were home runs, and his 1,904 career homerless at bats placed him second (behind Tom Oliver) among major league batters since 1900 who never hit a home run during their major league career.

Hall played 151 games for the A's in 1943, with a .256 batting average for the season on 139 hits in 544 at bats. In 1944, Hall had 150 hits in 559 at bats, ending the season with a .268 average, his best in the majors. Hall batted .261 in the 1945 season, with 161 hits in 616 at bats, his 148 singles and his 484 outs both leading the American League that season. In 1946, his last season in the majors, Hall had 46 hits in 185 at bats, hitting for a .259 average.

There were bursts of slugging power while playing 12 seasons of minor league baseball, during which Hall hit 34 home runs overall during his career both before and after his Major League stint. In his first two full seasons in professional baseball, Hall hit nine home runs in both 1938 and 1939 for the Class D Pocomoke City Red Sox of the Eastern Shore League. After leaving the majors, Hall hit a career-best 11 home runs in 1949 for the Aberdeen Pheasants, the minor-league affiliate of the St. Louis Browns in the Class C Northern League. He was a playing manager that season, during a four-year stint as a minor league skipper in the Browns' and Athletics' systems.

Hall died on December 12, 2006, in Baltimore, Maryland, and is buried at Dulaney Valley Memorial Gardens.
