= 1943 Major League Baseball season =

1943 MLB season
- League: American League (AL); National League (NL)
- Sport: Baseball
- Duration: Regular season: April 20 – October 3, 1943 (AL); April 21 – October 3, 1943 (NL); World Series: October 5–11, 1943
- Games: 154
- Teams: 16 (8 per league)

Regular season
- Season MVP: AL: Spud Chandler (NYY); NL: Stan Musial (STL)
- AL champions: New York Yankees
- AL runners-up: Washington Senators
- NL champions: St. Louis Cardinals
- NL runners-up: Cincinnati Reds

World Series
- Champions: New York Yankees
- Runners-up: St. Louis Cardinals

MLB seasons
- ← 1942 1944 →

Locations of teams for the 1942–1953 American League seasons
American League
Locations of teams for the 1943–1952 National League seasons
National League

The 1943 major league baseball season began on April 20, 1943. The regular season ended on October 3, with the St. Louis Cardinals and New York Yankees as the regular season champions of the National League and American League, respectively. The postseason began with Game 1 of the 40th World Series on October 5 and ended with Game 5 on October 11. In the fourth iteration of this World Series matchup (and a rematch of the previous year), the Yankees defeated the Cardinals, four games to one, capturing their tenth championship in franchise history, since their previous in 1941. Going into the season, the defending World Series champions were the St. Louis Cardinals from the 1942 season.

The 11th All-Star Game was held on July 13 at the Shibe Park in Philadelphia, Pennsylvania, hosted by the Philadelphia Athletics. The American League won, 5–3. This was also the first All-Star Game held at night.

In order to conserve rail transport during World War II, the 1943 spring training sites was limited to an area east of the Mississippi River and north of the Ohio River. Spring training sites included the Chicago White Sox in French Lick, Indiana; the Washington Senators in College Park, Maryland; and the Yankees in Asbury Park, New Jersey.

== Schedule ==
The 1943 schedule consisted of 154 games for all teams in the American League and National League, each of which had eight teams. Each team was scheduled to play 22 games against the other seven teams of their respective league. This continued the format put in place since the 1904 season (except for 1919) and would be used until 1961 in the American League and 1962 in the National League.

American League Opening Day took place on April 20 with a game between the Philadelphia Athletics and Washington Senators, while National League Opening Day took place on the following day, featuring four teams. This was the first season since 1941 that both leagues opened on different days. The final day of the regular season was on October 3, which saw all sixteen teams play, also the first time since 1941. The World Series took place between October 5 and October 11.

== Rule changes ==
The 1943 season saw the following rule changes:

- Draft rules in regard to payment of the selection fee for players on the National Defense, voluntarily retired, and suspended lists were revised. Previously, teams had not had to pay the selection fee until the player reported to the team. With the new revision, teams would now have to pay the fee when the player was selected.
- During the July All-Star break, Commissioner Kenesaw Mountain Landis granted the Washington Senators the ability to play an unlimited amount of weekday night games (previously, they were allowed 21, while other teams were still only allowed 14).

== Teams ==
An asterisk (*) denotes the ballpark a team played the minority of their home games at

League	Team	City	Ballpark	Capacity	Manager
American League	Boston Red Sox	Boston, Massachusetts	Fenway Park	33,817	Joe Cronin
American League	Chicago White Sox	Chicago, Illinois	Comiskey Park	50,000	Jimmy Dykes
American League	Cleveland Indians	Cleveland, Ohio	Cleveland Stadium	78,811	Lou Boudreau
American League	Cleveland Indians	Cleveland, Ohio	League Park*	22,500*	Lou Boudreau
American League	Detroit Tigers	Detroit, Michigan	Briggs Stadium	58,000	Steve O'Neill
American League	New York Yankees	New York, New York	Yankee Stadium	70,000	Joe McCarthy
American League	Philadelphia Athletics	Philadelphia, Pennsylvania	Shibe Park	33,000	Connie Mack
American League	St. Louis Browns	St. Louis, Missouri	Sportsman's Park	34,023	Luke Sewell
American League	Washington Senators	Washington, D.C.	Griffith Stadium	32,000	Ossie Bluege
National League	Boston Braves	Boston, Massachusetts	Braves Field	37,746	Casey Stengel
National League	Boston Braves	Boston, Massachusetts	Braves Field	37,746	Bob Coleman
National League	Brooklyn Dodgers	New York, New York	Ebbets Field	35,000	Leo Durocher
National League	Chicago Cubs	Chicago, Illinois	Wrigley Field	38,396	Jimmie Wilson
National League	Cincinnati Reds	Cincinnati, Ohio	Crosley Field	29,401	Bill McKechnie
National League	New York Giants	New York, New York	Polo Grounds	56,000	Mel Ott
National League	Philadelphia Phillies	Philadelphia, Pennsylvania	Shibe Park	33,000	Bucky Harris
National League	Philadelphia Phillies	Philadelphia, Pennsylvania	Shibe Park	33,000	Freddie Fitzsimmons
National League	Pittsburgh Pirates	Pittsburgh, Pennsylvania	Forbes Field	33,467	Frankie Frisch
National League	St. Louis Cardinals	St. Louis, Missouri	Sportsman's Park	34,023	Billy Southworth

== Standings ==
=== American League ===
American League
Team	W	L	Pct.	GB	Home	Road
New York Yankees	98	56	.636	—	54‍–‍23	44‍–‍33
Washington Senators	84	69	.549	13½	44‍–‍32	40‍–‍37
Cleveland Indians	82	71	.536	15½	44‍–‍33	38‍–‍38
Chicago White Sox	82	72	.532	16	40‍–‍36	42‍–‍36
Detroit Tigers	78	76	.506	20	45‍–‍32	33‍–‍44
St. Louis Browns	72	80	.474	25	44‍–‍33	28‍–‍47
Boston Red Sox	68	84	.447	29	39‍–‍36	29‍–‍48
Philadelphia Athletics	49	105	.318	49	27‍–‍51	22‍–‍54

=== National League ===
National League
Team	W	L	Pct.	GB	Home	Road
St. Louis Cardinals	105	49	.682	—	58‍–‍21	47‍–‍28
Cincinnati Reds	87	67	.565	18	48‍–‍29	39‍–‍38
Brooklyn Dodgers	81	72	.529	23½	46‍–‍31	35‍–‍41
Pittsburgh Pirates	80	74	.519	25	47‍–‍30	33‍–‍44
Chicago Cubs	74	79	.484	30½	36‍–‍38	38‍–‍41
Boston Braves	68	85	.444	36½	38‍–‍39	30‍–‍46
Philadelphia Phillies	64	90	.416	41	33‍–‍43	31‍–‍47
New York Giants	55	98	.359	49½	34‍–‍43	21‍–‍55

=== Tie games ===
11 tie games (4 in AL, 7 in NL), which are not factored into winning percentage or games behind (and were often replayed again) occurred throughout the season.

==== American League ====
- Boston Red Sox, 3
- Chicago White Sox, 1
- Detroit Tigers, 1
- New York Yankees, 1
- Philadelphia Athletics, 1
- St. Louis Browns, 1

==== National League ====
- Chicago Cubs, 1
- Cincinnati Reds, 1
- New York Giants, 3
- Philadelphia Phillies, 3
- Pittsburgh Pirates, 3
- St. Louis Cardinals, 3

== Postseason ==
The postseason began on October 5 and ended on October 11 with the New York Yankees defeating the St. Louis Cardinals in the 1943 World Series in five games.

=== Bracket ===
World Series
AL	New York Yankees	4
NL	St. Louis Cardinals	1

== Managerial changes ==
=== Off-season ===
Team	Former Manager	New Manager
Detroit Tigers	Del Baker	Steve O'Neill
Philadelphia Phillies	Hans Lobert	Bucky Harris
Washington Senators	Bucky Harris	Ossie Bluege

=== In-season ===
Team	Former Manager	New Manager
Boston Braves	Casey Stengel	Bob Coleman
Philadelphia Phillies	Bucky Harris	Freddie Fitzsimmons

== League leaders ==
=== American League ===
Hitting leaders
Stat	Player	Total
AVG	Luke Appling (CWS)	.328
OPS	Charlie Keller (NYY)	.922
HR	Rudy York (DET)	34
RBI	Rudy York (DET)	118
R	George Case (WSH)	102
H	Dick Wakefield (DET)	200
SB	George Case (WSH)	61

Pitching leaders
Stat	Player	Total
W	Spud Chandler (NYY); Dizzy Trout (DET)	20
L	Lum Harris (PHA)	21
ERA	Spud Chandler (NYY)	1.64
K	Allie Reynolds (CLE)	151
IP	Jim Bagby (CLE)	273.0
SV	Gordon Maltzberger (CWS)	14
WHIP	Spud Chandler (NYY)	0.992

=== National League ===
Hitting leaders
Stat	Player	Total
AVG	Stan Musial (STL)	.357
OPS	Stan Musial (STL)	.988
HR	Bill Nicholson (CHC)	29
RBI	Bill Nicholson (CHC)	128
R	Arky Vaughan (BRO)	112
H	Stan Musial (STL)	220
SB	Arky Vaughan (BRO)	20

Pitching leaders
Stat	Player	Total
W	Mort Cooper (STL); Elmer Riddle (CIN); Rip Sewell (PIT)	21
L	Nate Andrews (BSN)	20
ERA	Max Lanier (STL)	1.90
K	Johnny Vander Meer (CIN)	174
IP	Al Javery (BSN)	303.0
SV	Les Webber (BRO)	10
WHIP	Whit Wyatt (BRO)	1.007

== Milestones ==
=== Batters ===
==== Cycles ====
- Leon Culberson (BOS):
  - Culberson hit for his first cycle, eighth in franchise history, and sixth natural cycle in major league history on July 3 against the Cleveland Indians.

== Awards and honors ==
=== Regular season ===
Baseball Writers' Association of America Awards
BBWAA Award	National League	American League
Most Valuable Player	Stan Musial (STL)	Spud Chandler (NYY)

=== Other awards ===
The Sporting News Awards
Award	National League	American League
Most Valuable Player	Stan Musial (STL)	Spud Chandler (NYY)
Player of the Year	—	Spud Chandler (NYY)
Manager of the Year	—	Joe McCarthy (NYY)
Executive of the Year	—	Clark Griffith (WSH)

== Home field attendance ==
Team name	Wins	%±	Home attendance	%±	Per game
Brooklyn Dodgers	81	−22.1%	661,739	−36.2%	8,594
New York Yankees	98	−4.9%	618,330	−32.9%	8,030
Detroit Tigers	78	6.8%	606,287	4.5%	7,773
Washington Senators	84	35.5%	574,694	42.4%	7,562
St. Louis Cardinals	105	−0.9%	517,135	−6.6%	6,384
Chicago White Sox	82	24.2%	508,962	19.5%	6,697
Chicago Cubs	74	8.8%	508,247	−14.0%	6,777
Pittsburgh Pirates	80	21.2%	498,740	11.1%	6,394
Philadelphia Phillies	64	52.4%	466,975	102.9%	5,987
New York Giants	55	−35.3%	466,095	−40.2%	6,053
Cleveland Indians	82	9.3%	438,894	−4.5%	5,700
Cincinnati Reds	87	14.5%	379,122	−11.2%	4,861
Philadelphia Athletics	49	−10.9%	376,735	−11.0%	4,769
Boston Red Sox	68	−26.9%	358,275	−50.9%	4,653
Boston Braves	68	15.3%	271,289	−4.9%	3,523
St. Louis Browns	72	−12.2%	214,392	−16.1%	2,784

== Venues ==
Over 77 home games, the Cleveland Indians played 48 games at Cleveland Stadium and 29 games at League Park. All Sunday home games took place at Cleveland Stadium. This would be the 9th of 12 seasons since 1932 that saw the Indians play at both venues.

== See also ==
- 1943 in baseball (Events, Births, Deaths)
- 1943 All-American Girls Professional Baseball League season
