= 1941 Chicago White Sox season =

1941 Chicago White Sox
- League: American League
- Ballpark: Comiskey Park
- City: Chicago
- Record: 77–77 (.500)
- League place: 3rd
- Owners: Grace Comiskey
- General manager: Harry Grabiner
- Managers: Jimmy Dykes
- Radio: WGN (AM) (Bob Elson, Jack Brickhouse); WCFL (Hal Totten, Jimmy Dudley); WJJD (Alan Hale, Pat Flanagan)

The 1941 Chicago White Sox season was the White Sox's 41st season in the major leagues, and their 42nd season overall. They finished with a record of 77–77, good enough for third place in the American League, 24 games behind the first place New York Yankees.

== Offseason ==
- November 6, 1940: Thurman Tucker was purchased by the White Sox from the Oklahoma City Indians.

== Regular season ==
- May 15, 1941: In a game against the Chicago White Sox, Joe DiMaggio of the New York Yankees began his major league record 56-game hitting streak with a hit off Sox pitcher Eddie Smith.

=== Season standings ===
American League
Team	W	L	Pct.	GB	Home	Road
New York Yankees	101	53	.656	—	51‍–‍26	50‍–‍27
Boston Red Sox	84	70	.545	17	47‍–‍30	37‍–‍40
Chicago White Sox	77	77	.500	24	38‍–‍39	39‍–‍38
Cleveland Indians	75	79	.487	26	42‍–‍35	33‍–‍44
Detroit Tigers	75	79	.487	26	43‍–‍34	32‍–‍45
St. Louis Browns	70	84	.455	31	40‍–‍37	30‍–‍47
Washington Senators	70	84	.455	31	40‍–‍37	30‍–‍47
Philadelphia Athletics	64	90	.416	37	36‍–‍41	28‍–‍49

=== Record vs. opponents ===
1941 American League record Sources:
Team	BOS	CWS	CLE	DET	NYY	PHA	SLB	WSH
Boston	—	16–6	9–13	11–11	9–13–1	16–6	9–13	14–8
Chicago	6–16	—	17–5	12–10–1	8–14	10–12	11–11–1	13–9
Cleveland	13–9	5–17	—	10–12	7–15	15–7	13–9–1	12–10
Detroit	11–11	10–12–1	12–10	—	11–11	13–9	11–11	7–15
New York	13–9–1	14–8	15–7	11–11	—	14–8	18–4	16–6–1
Philadelphia	6–16	12–10	7–15	9–13	8–14	—	11–11	11–11
St. Louis	13–9	11–11–1	9–13–1	11–11	4–18	11–11	—	11–11–1
Washington	8–14	9–13	10–12	15–7	6–16–1	11–11	11–11–1	—

=== Opening Day lineup ===
- Bill Knickerbocker, 2B
- Luke Appling, SS
- Joe Kuhel, 1B
- Moose Solters, LF
- Dario Lodigiani, 3B
- Larry Rosenthal, RF
- Mike Kreevich, CF
- Mike Tresh, C
- Bill Dietrich, P

=== Notable transactions ===
- August 1941: Dave Philley was purchased by the White Sox from the Monroe White Sox.

=== Roster ===
1941 Chicago White Sox
Roster
Pitchers: 48 Pete Appleton; 18 Bill Dietrich; 45 Orval Grove; 28 Jack Hallett; 35 Joe Haynes; 26 Johnny Humphries; 27 Thornton Lee; 16 Ted Lyons; 29 Johnny Rigney; 19 Buck Ross; 46 Eddie Smith	Catchers: 14 George Dickey; 15 Mike Tresh; 17 Tom Turner; Infielders: 4 Luke Appling; -- Jake Jones; 36 Bob Kennedy; 2,12 Bill Knickerbocker; 47 Don Kolloway; 3 Joe Kuhel; 7 Dario Lodigiani; 37 Skeeter Webb	Outfielders: 45 Ben Chapman; 24 Myril Hoag; 8 Mike Kreevich; 49 Dave Philley; 12 Larry Rosenthal; -- Dave Short; 9 Moose Solters; 6 Taffy Wright; Other batters: -- Stan Goletz; 42 Chet Hajduk	Manager: 5 Jimmy Dykes; Coaches: 22 Mule Haas; 38 Muddy Ruel; 25 Monty Stratton

== Player stats ==
=== Batting ===
Note: G = Games played; AB = At bats; R = Runs scored; H = Hits; 2B = Doubles; 3B = Triples; HR = Home runs; RBI = Runs batted in; BB = Base on balls; SO = Strikeouts; AVG = Batting average; SB = Stolen bases

Player	G	AB	R	H	2B	3B	HR	RBI	BB	SO	AVG	SB
Luke Appling, SS	154	592	93	186	26	8	1	57	82	32	.314	12
Ben Chapman, OF	57	190	26	43	9	1	2	19	19	14	.226	2
George Dickey, C	32	55	6	11	1	0	2	8	5	7	.200	0
Stan Goletz, PH	5	5	0	3	0	0	0	0	0	2	.600	0
Chet Hajduk, PH	1	1	0	0	0	0	0	0	0	0	.000	0
Myril Hoag, LF, CF	106	380	30	97	13	3	1	44	27	29	.255	6
Jake Jones, 1B	3	11	0	0	0	0	0	0	0	4	.000	0
Bob Kennedy, 3B	76	257	16	53	9	3	1	29	17	23	.206	5
Bill Knickerbocker, 2B	89	343	51	84	23	2	7	29	41	27	.245	6
Don Kolloway, 2B, 1B	71	280	33	76	8	3	3	24	6	12	.271	11
Mike Kreevich, CF	121	436	44	101	16	8	0	37	35	26	.232	17
Joe Kuhel, 1B	153	600	99	150	39	5	12	63	70	55	.250	20
Dario Lodigiani, 3B	87	322	39	77	19	2	4	40	31	19	.239	0
Dave Philley, LF	7	9	4	2	1	0	0	0	3	3	.222	0
Larry Rosenthal, RF, CF	20	59	9	14	4	0	0	1	12	5	.237	0
Dave Short, LF	3	8	0	0	0	0	0	0	2	1	.000	0
Moose Solters, LF	76	251	24	65	9	4	4	43	18	31	.259	3
Mike Tresh, C	115	390	38	98	10	1	0	33	38	27	.251	1
Tom Turner, C	38	126	7	30	5	0	0	8	9	15	.238	2
Skeeter Webb, 2B, SS, 3B	29	84	7	16	2	0	0	6	3	9	.190	1
Taffy Wright, RF	136	513	71	165	35	5	10	97	60	27	.322	5

Player	G	AB	R	H	2B	3B	HR	RBI	BB	SO	AVG	SB
Pete Appleton, P	13	4	0	1	0	0	0	0	0	0	.250	0
Bill Dietrich, P	19	34	4	3	1	0	0	1	7	11	.088	0
Orval Grove, P	2	2	0	0	0	0	0	0	0	1	.000	0
Jack Hallett, P	22	26	2	4	0	1	0	1	2	6	.154	0
Joe Haynes, P	8	11	3	3	0	0	0	0	0	1	.273	0
Johnny Humphries, P	14	23	1	2	2	0	0	3	0	12	.087	0
Thornton Lee, P	35	114	7	29	5	0	0	8	4	20	.254	0
Ted Lyons, P	22	74	8	20	2	0	0	6	2	6	.270	0
Johnny Rigney, P	30	84	8	17	1	1	0	5	6	27	.202	0
Buck Ross, P	20	32	2	7	1	0	0	2	2	5	.219	0
Eddie Smith, P	34	88	6	19	4	0	0	3	8	19	.216	0
Team totals	156	5404	638	1376	245	47	47	567	509	476	.255	91

=== Pitching ===
Note: W = Wins; L = Losses; ERA = Earned run average; G = Games pitched; GS = Games started; SV = Saves; IP = Innings pitched; H = Hits allowed; R = Runs allowed; ER = Earned runs allowed; HR = Home runs allowed; BB = Walks allowed; K = Strikeouts

Player	W	L	ERA	G	GS	SV	IP	H	R	ER	HR	BB	K
Pete Appleton	0	3	5.27	13	0	1	27.1	27	21	16	4	17	12
Bill Dietrich	5	8	5.35	19	15	0	109.1	114	73	65	7	50	26
Orval Grove	0	0	10.29	2	0	0	7.0	9	8	8	2	5	5
Jack Hallett	5	5	6.03	22	6	0	74.2	96	57	50	7	38	25
Joe Haynes	0	0	3.86	8	0	0	28.0	30	13	12	0	11	18
Johnny Humphries	4	2	1.84	14	6	1	73.1	63	18	15	2	22	25
Thornton Lee	22	11	2.37	35	34	1	300.1	258	98	79	18	92	130
Ted Lyons	12	10	3.70	22	22	0	187.1	199	87	77	9	37	63
Johnny Rigney	13	13	3.84	30	29	0	237.0	224	116	101	21	92	119
Buck Ross	3	8	3.16	20	11	0	108.1	99	51	38	6	43	30
Eddie Smith	13	17	3.18	34	33	1	263.1	243	107	93	13	114	111
Team totals	77	77	3.52	156	156	4	1416.0	1362	649	554	89	521	564

== Farm system ==
Level	Team	League	Manager
AA	St. Paul Saints	American Association	Red Kress
B	Waterloo White Hawks	Illinois–Indiana–Iowa League	Louis Brower and Johnny Mostil
C	Saginaw White Sox	Michigan State League	Bill Prince and Wally McMullen
C	Grand Forks Chiefs	Northern League	Larry Bettencourt
D	Jonesboro White Sox	Northeast Arkansas League	Johnny Mostil and Bill Prince
D	Lubbock Hubbers	West Texas–New Mexico League	Charlie Engle
D	Wisconsin Rapids White Sox	Wisconsin State League	Frank Parenti
