= 1941 New York Yankees season =

Season for the Major League Baseball team the New York Yankees

1941 New York Yankees
- World Series champions American League champions
- League: American League
- Ballpark: Yankee Stadium
- City: New York City, New York
- Record: 101–53 (.656)
- League place: 1st
- Owners: Estate of Jacob Ruppert
- General managers: Ed Barrow
- Managers: Joe McCarthy

The 1941 New York Yankees season was the 39th season for the team. New York was managed by Joe McCarthy. The Yankees played their home games at Yankee Stadium. The team finished with a record of 101–53, winning their 12th pennant, finishing 17 games ahead of the Boston Red Sox. In the World Series, they beat the Brooklyn Dodgers in 5 games.

Books and songs have been written about the 1941 season, the last before the United States became drawn into World War II. Yankees' center fielder Joe DiMaggio captured the nation's fancy with his lengthy hitting streak that extended through 56 games before finally being stopped. A big-band style song called Joltin' Joe DiMaggio was recorded by the Les Brown orchestra and became a hit the following year.

Additionally, DiMaggio, Tommy Henrich and Charlie Keller became the only outfield trio in major league history to each hit 30 home runs in a season.

== Regular season ==
- May 15, 1941: In a game against the Chicago White Sox, Joe DiMaggio began his major league record 56-game hitting streak with a hit off Sox pitcher Eddie Smith.

During the hitting streak, DiMaggio had a batting average of .408, hit 15 home runs, and accumulated 55 runs batted in. After the streak ended, DiMaggio began a 16-game hitting streak. DiMaggio would hit safely in 72 of 73 games, another record.

=== Season standings ===
American League
Team	W	L	Pct.	GB	Home	Road
New York Yankees	101	53	.656	—	51‍–‍26	50‍–‍27
Boston Red Sox	84	70	.545	17	47‍–‍30	37‍–‍40
Chicago White Sox	77	77	.500	24	38‍–‍39	39‍–‍38
Cleveland Indians	75	79	.487	26	42‍–‍35	33‍–‍44
Detroit Tigers	75	79	.487	26	43‍–‍34	32‍–‍45
St. Louis Browns	70	84	.455	31	40‍–‍37	30‍–‍47
Washington Senators	70	84	.455	31	40‍–‍37	30‍–‍47
Philadelphia Athletics	64	90	.416	37	36‍–‍41	28‍–‍49

=== Record vs. opponents ===
1941 American League record Sources:
Team	BOS	CWS	CLE	DET	NYY	PHA	SLB	WSH
Boston	—	16–6	9–13	11–11	9–13–1	16–6	9–13	14–8
Chicago	6–16	—	17–5	12–10–1	8–14	10–12	11–11–1	13–9
Cleveland	13–9	5–17	—	10–12	7–15	15–7	13–9–1	12–10
Detroit	11–11	10–12–1	12–10	—	11–11	13–9	11–11	7–15
New York	13–9–1	14–8	15–7	11–11	—	14–8	18–4	16–6–1
Philadelphia	6–16	12–10	7–15	9–13	8–14	—	11–11	11–11
St. Louis	13–9	11–11–1	9–13–1	11–11	4–18	11–11	—	11–11–1
Washington	8–14	9–13	10–12	15–7	6–16–1	11–11	11–11–1	—

=== Roster ===
1941 New York Yankees
Roster
Pitchers: 20 Tiny Bonham; 30 Norm Branch; 24 Marv Breuer; 21 Spud Chandler; 28 Atley Donald; 11 Lefty Gomez; 19 Johnny Murphy; 18 Steve Peek; 15 Red Ruffing; 22 Marius Russo; 17 Charley Stanceu; 29 George Washburn	Catchers: 8 Bill Dickey; 12 Buddy Rosar; 26 Ken Silvestri; Infielders: 1 Frankie Crosetti; 6 Joe Gordon; 14 Jerry Priddy; 10 Phil Rizzuto; 2 Red Rolfe; 34 Johnny Sturm	Outfielders: 27 Frenchy Bordagaray; 5 Joe DiMaggio; 7 Tommy Henrich; 9 Charlie Keller; 3 George Selkirk; Other batters: 16 Johnny Lindell	Manager: -- Joe McCarthy; Coaches: 32 Earle Combs; 31 Art Fletcher; 33 Johnny Schulte

== Player stats ==
=== Batting ===
==== Starters by position ====
Note: Pos = Position; G = Games played; AB = At bats; H = Hits; Avg. = Batting average; HR = Home runs; RBI = Runs batted in

Pos	Player	G	AB	H	Avg.	HR	RBI
C	Bill Dickey	109	348	99	.284	7	71
1B	Johnny Sturm	124	524	125	.239	3	36
2B	Joe Gordon	156	588	162	.276	24	87
3B	Red Rolfe	136	561	148	.264	8	42
SS	Phil Rizzuto	133	515	158	.307	3	46
OF	Joe DiMaggio	139	541	193	.357	30	125
OF	Tommy Henrich	144	538	149	.277	31	85
OF	Charlie Keller	140	507	151	.298	33	122

==== Other batters ====
Note: G = Games played; AB = At bats; H = Hits; Avg. = Batting average; HR = Home runs; RBI = Runs batted in

Player	G	AB	H	Avg.	HR	RBI
Buddy Rosar	67	209	60	.287	1	36
Jerry Priddy	56	174	37	.213	1	26
George Selkirk	70	164	36	.220	6	25
Frankie Crosetti	50	148	33	.223	1	22
Frenchy Bordagaray	36	73	19	.260	0	4
Ken Silvestri	17	40	10	.250	1	4
Johnny Lindell	1	1	0	.000	0	0

=== Pitching ===
==== Starting pitchers ====
Note: G = Games pitched; IP = Innings pitched; W = Wins; L = Losses; ERA = Earned run average; SO = Strikeouts

Player	G	IP	W	L	ERA	SO
Marius Russo	28	209.2	14	10	3.09	105
Red Ruffing	23	185.2	15	6	3.54	60
Spud Chandler	28	163.2	10	4	3.19	60
Atley Donald	22	159.0	9	5	3.57	71
Lefty Gomez	23	156.1	15	5	3.74	76
George Washburn	1	2.0	0	1	13.50	1

==== Other pitchers ====
Note: G = Games pitched; IP = Innings pitched; W = Wins; L = Losses; ERA = Earned run average; SO = Strikeouts

Player	G	IP	W	L	ERA	SO
Marv Breuer	26	141.0	9	7	4.09	77
Tiny Bonham	23	126.2	10	6	2.98	43
Steve Peek	17	80.0	4	2	5.06	18

==== Relief pitchers ====
Note: G = Games pitched; W = Wins; L = Losses; SV = Saves; ERA = Earned run average; SO = Strikeouts

Player	G	W	L	SV	ERA	SO
Johnny Murphy	35	8	3	15	1.98	29
Norm Branch	27	5	1	2	2.87	28
Charley Stanceu	22	3	3	0	5.63	21

== 1941 World Series ==
AL New York Yankees (4) vs. NL Brooklyn Dodgers (1)

Game	Score	Date	Location	Attendance
1	Dodgers – 2, Yankees – 3	October 1	Yankee Stadium	68,540
2	Dodgers – 3, Yankees – 2	October 2	Yankee Stadium	66,248
3	Yankees – 2, Dodgers – 1	October 4	Ebbets Field	33,100
4	Yankees – 7, Dodgers – 4	October 5	Ebbets Field	33,813
5	Yankees – 3, Dodgers – 1	October 6	Ebbets Field	34,072

== Awards and honors ==
- Joe DiMaggio, AL MVP
- Joe DiMaggio, Associated Press Athlete of the Year

== Farm system ==
Level	Team	League	Manager
AA	Kansas City Blues	American Association	Billy Meyer
AA	Newark Bears	International League	Johnny Neun
A	Binghamton Triplets	Eastern League	Phil Page
B	Norfolk Tars	Piedmont League	Eddie Sawyer
B	Augusta Tigers	Sally League	Lefty Jenkins and Alton Biggs
C	Amsterdam Rugmakers	Canadian–American League	Paul O'Malley
C	Akron Yankees	Middle Atlantic League	Buzz Boyle
C	Idaho Falls Russets	Pioneer League	Bob Coltrin and Doc Marshall
C	Joplin Miners	Western Association	Doc Bennett
D	Easton Yankees	Eastern Shore League	Dallas Warren
D	Butler Yankees	Pennsylvania State Association	Tom Kain
D	Norfolk Yankees	Western League	Ray Powell

LEAGUE CHAMPIONS: Joplin, Easton, Butler
