= 1941 Cleveland Indians season =

1941 Cleveland Indians
- League: American League
- Ballpark: League Park; Cleveland Municipal Stadium
- City: Cleveland, Ohio
- Record: 79–75 (.513)
- League place: T–4th
- Owners: Alva Bradley
- General managers: Cy Slapnicka, Roger Peckinpaugh
- Managers: Roger Peckinpaugh
- Radio: WCLE · WHK (Jack Graney, Pinky Hunter)

The 1941 Cleveland Indians season was a season in American major league baseball. The team finished fourth in the American League with a record of 75–79–1.

== Regular season ==
=== Season standings ===
American League
Team	W	L	Pct.	GB	Home	Road
New York Yankees	101	53	.656	—	51‍–‍26	50‍–‍27
Boston Red Sox	84	70	.545	17	47‍–‍30	37‍–‍40
Chicago White Sox	77	77	.500	24	38‍–‍39	39‍–‍38
Cleveland Indians	75	79	.487	26	42‍–‍35	33‍–‍44
Detroit Tigers	75	79	.487	26	43‍–‍34	32‍–‍45
St. Louis Browns	70	84	.455	31	40‍–‍37	30‍–‍47
Washington Senators	70	84	.455	31	40‍–‍37	30‍–‍47
Philadelphia Athletics	64	90	.416	37	36‍–‍41	28‍–‍49

=== Record vs. opponents ===
1941 American League record Sources:
Team	BOS	CWS	CLE	DET	NYY	PHA	SLB	WSH
Boston	—	16–6	9–13	11–11	9–13–1	16–6	9–13	14–8
Chicago	6–16	—	17–5	12–10–1	8–14	10–12	11–11–1	13–9
Cleveland	13–9	5–17	—	10–12	7–15	15–7	13–9–1	12–10
Detroit	11–11	10–12–1	12–10	—	11–11	13–9	11–11	7–15
New York	13–9–1	14–8	15–7	11–11	—	14–8	18–4	16–6–1
Philadelphia	6–16	12–10	7–15	9–13	8–14	—	11–11	11–11
St. Louis	13–9	11–11–1	9–13–1	11–11	4–18	11–11	—	11–11–1
Washington	8–14	9–13	10–12	15–7	6–16–1	11–11	11–11–1	—

=== Roster ===
1941 Cleveland Indians
Roster
Pitchers: 12 Nate Andrews; 17 Jim Bagby; 21 Clint Brown; 16 Chubby Dean; 33 Cal Dorsett; 10 Harry Eisenstat; 40 Red Embree; 19 Bob Feller; 36 Steve Gromek; 18 Mel Harder; 11 Joe Heving; 36 Ken Jungels; 15 Joe Krakauskas; 20 Al Milnar; 32 Al Smith	Catchers: 4 Gene Desautels; 9 Jim Hegan; 9 Rollie Hemsley; 28 George Susce; Infielders: 5 Lou Boudreau; 18 Jack Conway; 23 Les Fleming; 11 Vern Freiburger; 1 Oscar Grimes; 25,8 Ken Keltner; 38 Bob Lemon; 6 Ray Mack; 3 Rusty Peters; 7 Hal Trosky	Outfielders: 23 Beau Bell; 34 Soup Campbell; 33 Hank Edwards; 7 Buck Frierson; 14 Fabian Gaffke; 24 Jeff Heath; -- Oris Hockett; 14 Larry Rosenthal; 2 Gee Walker; 22 Roy Weatherly; Other batters: 45 Red Howell; 38 Chuck Workman	Manager: 27 Roger Peckinpaugh; Coaches: -- Luke Sewell; 28 George Susce; 26 Earl Whitehill; 12 Dutch Zwilling

== Player stats ==
=== Batting ===
==== Starters by position ====
Note: Pos = Position; G = Games played; AB = At bats; H = Hits; Avg. = Batting average; HR = Home runs; RBI = Runs batted in

Pos	Player	G	AB	H	Avg.	HR	RBI
C	Rollie Hemsley	98	288	69	.240	2	24
1B	Hal Trosky	89	310	91	.294	11	51
2B	Ray Mack	145	500	114	.228	9	44
SS	Lou Boudreau	148	579	149	.257	10	56
3B	Ken Keltner	149	581	156	.269	23	84
OF	Gee Walker	121	445	126	.283	6	48
OF	Jeff Heath	151	585	199	.340	24	123
OF	Roy Weatherly	102	363	105	.289	3	37

==== Other batters ====
Note: G = Games played; AB = At bats; H = Hits; Avg. = Batting average; HR = Home runs; RBI = Runs batted in

Player	G	AB	H	Avg.	HR	RBI
Soup Campbell	104	328	82	.250	3	35
Oscar Grimes	77	244	58	.238	4	24
Gene Desautels	66	189	38	.201	1	17
Beau Bell	48	104	20	.192	0	9
Larry Rosenthal	45	75	14	.187	1	8
Hank Edwards	16	68	15	.221	1	6
Rusty Peters	29	63	13	.206	0	2
Jim Hegan	16	47	15	.319	1	5
Buck Frierson	5	11	3	.273	0	2
Les Fleming	2	8	2	.250	0	2
Vern Freiburger	2	8	1	.125	0	1
Red Howell	11	7	2	.286	0	2
Oris Hockett	2	6	2	.333	0	1
Fabian Gaffke	4	4	1	.250	0	0
Chuck Workman	9	4	0	.000	0	0
Bob Lemon	5	4	1	.250	0	0
Jack Conway	2	2	1	.500	0	1
George Susce	1	0	0	----	0	0

=== Pitching ===
==== Starting pitchers ====
Note: G = Games pitched; IP = Innings pitched; W = Wins; L = Losses; ERA = Earned run average; SO = Strikeouts

Player	G	IP	W	L	ERA	SO
Bob Feller	44	343.0	25	13	3.15	260
Al Milnar	35	229.1	12	19	4.36	82
Al Smith	29	206.2	12	13	3.83	76
Jim Bagby	33	200.2	9	15	4.04	53
Mel Harder	15	68.2	5	4	5.24	21

==== Other pitchers ====
Note: G = Games pitched; IP = Innings pitched; W = Wins; L = Losses; ERA = Earned run average; SO = Strikeouts

Player	G	IP	W	L	ERA	SO
Chubby Dean	8	53.1	1	4	4.39	14
Ken Jungels	6	13.2	0	0	7.24	6
Cal Dorsett	5	11.1	0	1	10.32	5
Red Embree	1	4.0	0	1	6.75	4
Nate Andrews	2	2.1	0	0	11.57	1

==== Relief pitchers ====
Note: G = Games pitched; W = Wins; L = Losses; SV = Saves; ERA = Earned run average; SO = Strikeouts

Player	G	W	L	SV	ERA	SO
Clint Brown	41	3	3	5	3.27	22
Joe Heving	27	5	2	5	2.29	18
Harry Eisenstat	21	1	1	2	4.24	11
Joe Krakauskas	12	1	2	0	4.10	25
Steve Gromek	9	1	1	2	4.24	19

== Awards and honors ==
All-Star Game

Lou Boudreau, Shortstop

Bob Feller, Pitcher (starter)

Jeff Heath, Outfielder (starter)

Ken Keltner, Third baseman

== Farm system ==
Level	Team	League	Manager
A1	Oklahoma City Indians	Texas League	Rogers Hornsby and Homer Peel
A	Wilkes-Barre Barons	Eastern League	Earl Wolgamot
B	Cedar Rapids Raiders	Illinois–Indiana–Iowa League	Ollie Marquardt
C	Flint Indians	Michigan State League	Jack Knight
C	Charleston Senators	Middle Atlantic League	Ed Hall
C	Salina Millers	Western Association	Russ Rollings, Jimmy Payton and John Fitzpatrick
D	Thomasville Tommies	North Carolina State League	Jim Gruzdis
D	Mansfield Braves	Ohio State League	Alex Chowson
D	Appleton Papermakers	Wisconsin State League	Ed Dancisak

LEAGUE CHAMPIONS: Cedar Rapids, Flint
