= Red Howell =

American baseball player (1909–1950)

- Outfielder
- Born: January 29, 1909; Atlanta, Georgia, U.S.
- Died: October 1, 1950 (aged 41); Travelers Rest, South Carolina, U.S.
- Batted: Right Threw: Right

MLB debut
- April 24, 1941, for the Cleveland Indians

Last MLB appearance
- May 26, 1941, for the Cleveland Indians

MLB statistics
- Batting average: .286
- Home runs: 0
- Runs batted in: 2
- Stats at Baseball Reference

Teams
- Cleveland Indians (1941)

Murray Donald Howell (January 29, 1909 – October 1, 1950), nicknamed "Porky", was an American Major League Baseball player who played for one season. He played for the Cleveland Indians for 11 games as a pinch hitter during the 1941 Cleveland Indians season.

== Career ==
Howell began his sports career as a minor league outfielder and batter, spending his early time with the Carrollton Frogs, before being purchased by team owner Frank Walker for the Greenville Spinners of South Carolina. He spent the 1929 and 1930 seasons with the Spinners, before moving on to other minor league endeavors, ultimately culminating in a stint on the Baltimore Orioles team, before reaching major league status with the Cleveland Indians for the 1941 season. Howell returned to the minors following his season with the Indians, serving on such teams as the Knoxville Smokies, the Jersey City Giants, and ending his career with the Atlanta Crackers.

He appeared at the plate only eleven times at the Major League level. He had two singles and four walks in his career, and struck out twice.
