= Steve Peek =

American baseball player

- Pitcher
- Born: July 30, 1914; Springfield, Massachusetts, U.S.
- Died: September 20, 1991 (aged 77); Syracuse, New York, U.S.
- Batted: Both Threw: Right

MLB debut
- April 16, 1941, for the New York Yankees

Last MLB appearance
- September 6, 1941, for the New York Yankees

MLB statistics
- Win–loss record: 4–2
- Earned run average: 5.06
- Strikeouts: 18
- Stats at Baseball Reference

Teams
- New York Yankees (1941)

Stephen George Peek (July 30, 1914 - September 20, 1991) was an American Major League Baseball pitcher who played in 1941 with the New York Yankees. He batted left and right and threw right-handed. Peek had a 4–2 record, with a 5.06 ERA, in 17 games, in his one-year career.

Peek served in the military during World War II.

He was born in Springfield, Massachusetts and died in Syracuse, New York.
