= Joe Krakauskas =

Canadian baseball player (1915–1960)

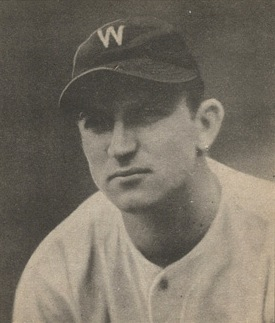
- Pitcher
- Born: March 28, 1915; Montreal, Quebec, Canada
- Died: July 8, 1960 (aged 45); Hamilton, Ontario, Canada
- Batted: Left Threw: Left

MLB debut
- September 9, 1937, for the Washington Senators

Last MLB appearance
- September 18, 1946, for the Cleveland Indians

MLB statistics
- Win–loss record: 26–36
- Earned run average: 4.53
- Strikeouts: 347
- Stats at Baseball Reference

Teams
- Washington Senators (1937–1940); Cleveland Indians (1941–1942, 1946)

Joseph Victor Lawrence Krakauskas (March 28, 1915 – July 8, 1960) was a Canadian professional baseball pitcher who appeared in 149 games over seven seasons in Major League Baseball (MLB) for the Washington Senators (1937–1940) and Cleveland Indians (1941–1942, 1946).

A left-hander, he is known for giving up the final hit during Joe DiMaggio's 56-game hit streak in 1941. DiMaggio's blow off Krakauskas, a double, was his third and final safety of game 56 on July 16, during a 10–3 triumph for his New York Yankees at Cleveland's League Park.

== Early life ==
Of Lithuanian descent, Krakauskas was born in Montreal, but grew up in Hamilton, Ontario, where he attended Cathedral High School. He was listed as 6 feet 1 inch (1.85 metres) tall and weighed 203 pounds (92 kilograms). His professional baseball career began in 1935 in the Washington organization and by September 1937 Krakauskas had worked his way to the American League and the Senators themselves.

== Baseball career ==
Krakauskas made his MLB debut on September 9, 1937, at Shibe Park. Entering the game in the third inning in relief of starting pitcher Dick Lanahan with the opposition Philadelphia Athletics ahead 6–2, Krakauskas proceeded to hurl seven full innings of scoreless ball. He allowed only one hit (to Wally Moses) but issued seven walks. His stalwart effort enabled the Senators to roar back with 11 unanswered runs, claim a 13–6 comeback win, and give Krakauskas his first major-league triumph. Bucky Harris, the manager of the Senators, then gave Krakauskas four starting assignments, and he threw three complete games, finishing the 1937 season with a 4–1 win–loss record and 2.70 earned run average.

He remained with the Senators for the next three full seasons, but his effectiveness declined each year. He lost 17 games in 1939, third-most in the American League, and then posted a poor 1–6 (6.44) mark in 32 games in the 1940 season. On December 24, 1940, Washington traded Krakauskas to the Cleveland Indians for outfielder Ben Chapman. He spent part of the 1941 and 1942 seasons in the minor leagues, working in a total of only 15 games in a Cleveland uniform.

== RCAF service and later career ==
With his native Canada at war with Nazi Germany since September 1939, Krakauskas joined the Royal Canadian Air Force for World War II service on June 14, 1942. His bomber squadron was initially based at Halifax, Nova Scotia, before shipping out to an airfield in England, where Krakauskas served as a radio mechanic.

Krakauskas returned to baseball on May 5, 1946, the first postwar season. He worked in 29 games, with five starts, for the Indians. It was his final MLB campaign. Krakauskas pitched in the high minor leagues through 1949, then left professional baseball.

In his 149 MLB appearances, Krakauskas compiled a 26–36 record (.419) record and a career ERA of 4.53. In 63 starts, he threw 22 complete games and one shutout, a three-hit, 7–0 effort against Philadelphia on September 3, 1938. He earned four saves as a relief pitcher. In 5832/3 innings pitched, he allowed 605 hits and 355 bases on balls, and recorded 347 strikeouts.

== Post-playing career ==
Returning to Hamilton, he worked as a car salesman before dying from pneumonia at age 45 on July 8, 1960.
