= Chet Hajduk =

American baseball player (1918–2006)

- Pinch hitter
- Born: July 21, 1918; Chicago, Illinois, U.S.
- Died: July 4, 2006 (aged 87); Chicago, Illinois, U.S.
- Batted: Right Threw: Right

MLB debut
- April 16, 1941, for the Chicago White Sox

Last MLB appearance
- April 16, 1941, for the Chicago White Sox

MLB statistics
- Games: 1
- At bats: 1
- Hits: 0
- Stats at Baseball Reference

Teams
- Chicago White Sox (1941)

Chester Hajduk (July 21, 1918 – July 4, 2006) was an American professional baseball player who played in one game as a pinch hitter for the Chicago White Sox of Major League Baseball in 1941. Hajduk grounded out in his only at-bat, which came against Cleveland Indians pitcher Al Milnar. Hajduk enlisted with the US Navy in early 1942. Hajduk played with the Great Lakes Naval Station team, and was a member of the Armed Services team that played the American League All-Stars in an exhibition/fund raising game at Municipal Stadium in Cleveland on the 7th of July, 1942. After the war Hajduk settled in Niles, Illinois, becoming a successful building contractor and raising a family.
