= Norm Branch =

American baseball player (1915-1971)

- Pitcher
- Born: March 22, 1915; Spokane, Washington, U.S.
- Died: November 21, 1971 (aged 56); Navasota, Texas, U.S.
- Batted: Right Threw: Right

MLB debut
- May 5, 1941, for the New York Yankees

Last MLB appearance
- August 20, 1942, for the New York Yankees

MLB statistics
- Win–loss record: 5–2
- Earned run average: 3.73
- Strikeouts: 41
- Stats at Baseball Reference

Teams
- New York Yankees (1941–1942)

Norman Downs (Red) Branch Sr. (March 22, 1915 – November 21, 1971) was a Major League Baseball pitcher. Branch played for the New York Yankees in 1941 and 1942. In 37 career games, he had a 5–2 record with a 3.73 ERA. He batted and threw right-handed.

After serving in World War II, Branch worked for the United States Postal Service from 1946–1971 in Montgomery, Texas.
