= 1941 St. Louis Browns season =

Major League Baseball season

1941 St. Louis Browns
- League: American League
- Ballpark: Sportsman's Park
- City: St. Louis, Missouri
- Record: 70–84 (.455)
- League place: 6th
- Owners: Donald Lee Barnes
- General managers: Bill DeWitt
- Managers: Fred Haney, Luke Sewell
- Radio: KWK (Dizzy Dean); KXOK

The 1941 St. Louis Browns season was a season in American baseball. It involved the Browns finishing 6th in the American League with a record of 70 wins and 84 losses.

== Offseason ==
- November 16, 1940: George Caster was selected off waivers by the Browns from the Philadelphia Athletics.

== Regular season ==
The 1941 season marked a change in management, as Luke Sewell was appointed the Browns new manager on June 5, 1941. While the St. Louis Cardinals drew over 600,000 fans, the Browns barely drew 175,000. The consensus was that St. Louis could not support two teams.

=== Potential move to Los Angeles ===
The Browns ownership had reached an agreement to move the franchise to Los Angeles. The Los Angeles Chamber of Commerce had guaranteed attendance of 500,000, a figure that the Browns had not seen since their 1924 season. The Browns would play in the stadium that was used by the Pacific Coast League's Los Angeles Angels. As part of the agreement to move to Los Angeles, the Browns would buy the stadium. It was expected that all Major League Baseball owners would approve of the move at the upcoming Winter Meetings. Before the scheduled meetings, the Japanese bombed Pearl Harbor, and California would stay closed to Major League Baseball for another decade.

=== Season standings ===
American League
Team	W	L	Pct.	GB	Home	Road
New York Yankees	101	53	.656	—	51‍–‍26	50‍–‍27
Boston Red Sox	84	70	.545	17	47‍–‍30	37‍–‍40
Chicago White Sox	77	77	.500	24	38‍–‍39	39‍–‍38
Cleveland Indians	75	79	.487	26	42‍–‍35	33‍–‍44
Detroit Tigers	75	79	.487	26	43‍–‍34	32‍–‍45
St. Louis Browns	70	84	.455	31	40‍–‍37	30‍–‍47
Washington Senators	70	84	.455	31	40‍–‍37	30‍–‍47
Philadelphia Athletics	64	90	.416	37	36‍–‍41	28‍–‍49

=== Record vs. opponents ===
1941 American League record Sources:
Team	BOS	CWS	CLE	DET	NYY	PHA	SLB	WSH
Boston	—	16–6	9–13	11–11	9–13–1	16–6	9–13	14–8
Chicago	6–16	—	17–5	12–10–1	8–14	10–12	11–11–1	13–9
Cleveland	13–9	5–17	—	10–12	7–15	15–7	13–9–1	12–10
Detroit	11–11	10–12–1	12–10	—	11–11	13–9	11–11	7–15
New York	13–9–1	14–8	15–7	11–11	—	14–8	18–4	16–6–1
Philadelphia	6–16	12–10	7–15	9–13	8–14	—	11–11	11–11
St. Louis	13–9	11–11–1	9–13–1	11–11	4–18	11–11	—	11–11–1
Washington	8–14	9–13	10–12	15–7	6–16–1	11–11	11–11–1	—

=== Notable transactions ===
- May 5, 1941: Rip Radcliff was purchased from the Browns by the Detroit Tigers for $25,000.

=== Roster ===
1941 St. Louis Browns
Roster
Pitchers: 30 Johnny Allen; 18 Elden Auker; 20 Emil Bildilli; 25 George Caster; 22 Denny Galehouse; 24 Bob Harris; 26 Hooks Iott; 27 Vern Kennedy; 19 Jack Kramer; 30 Archie McKain; 29 Bob Muncrief; 23 Maury Newlin; 21 Johnny Niggeling; 16 Fritz Ostermueller; 17 Bill Trotter	Catchers: 11 Rick Ferrell; 6 Frank Grube; 8 Bob Swift; Infielders: 52 George Archie; 4 Johnny Berardino; 7 Harlond Clift; 1 Don Heffner; 5 Johnny Lucadello; 3 George McQuinn; 6 Vern Stephens; 10 Chuck Stevens; 2 Alan Strange	Outfielders: 50 Roy Cullenbine; 14 Bobby Estalella; 9 Joe Grace; 12 Wally Judnich; 28 Chet Laabs; 15 Glenn McQuillen; 11 Rip Radcliff; Other batters: 11 Myril Hoag	Manager: 34 Fred Haney; 32 Luke Sewell; Coaches: 35 Johnny Bassler; 33 Fred Hofmann; 34 Zack Taylor

== Player stats ==
= Indicates team leader

=== Batting ===
==== Starters by position ====
Note: Pos = Position; G = Games played; AB = At bats; H = Hits; Avg. = Batting average; HR = Home runs; RBI = Runs batted in

Pos	Player	G	AB	H	Avg.	HR	RBI
C	Rick Ferrell	100	321	81	.252	2	23
1B	George McQuinn	130	495	147	.297	18	80
2B	Don Heffner	110	399	93	.233	0	17
SS	Johnny Berardino	128	469	127	.271	5	89
3B	Harlond Clift	154	584	149	.255	17	84
OF	Wally Judnich	146	546	155	.284	14	83
OF	Chet Laabs	118	392	109	.278	15	59
OF	Roy Cullenbine	149	501	159	.317	9	98

==== Other batters ====
Note: G = Games played; AB = At bats; H = Hits; Avg. = Batting average; HR = Home runs; RBI = Runs batted in

Player	G	AB	H	Avg.	HR	RBI
Joe Grace	115	362	112	.309	6	60
Johnny Lucadello	107	351	98	.279	2	31
Bob Swift	63	170	44	.259	0	21
Alan Strange	45	112	26	.232	0	11
Bobby Estalella	46	83	20	.241	0	14
Rip Radcliff	19	71	20	.282	2	14
Frank Grube	18	39	6	.154	0	1
George Archie	9	29	11	.379	0	5
Glenn McQuillen	7	21	7	.333	0	3
Chuck Stevens	4	13	2	.154	0	2
Vern Stephens	3	2	1	.500	0	0
Myril Hoag	1	1	0	.000	0	0

=== Pitching ===
==== Starting pitchers ====
Note: G = Games pitched; IP = Innings pitched; W = Wins; L = Losses; ERA = Earned run average; SO = Strikeouts

Player	G	IP	W	L	ERA	SO
Elden Auker	34	216.0	14	15	5.50	60
Denny Galehouse	30	190.1	9	10	3.64	61
Bob Harris	34	186.2	12	14	5.21	57
Johnny Niggeling	24	168.1	7	9	3.80	68
Vern Kennedy	6	45.0	2	4	4.40	6

==== Other pitchers ====
Note: G = Games pitched; IP = Innings pitched; W = Wins; L = Losses; ERA = Earned run average; SO = Strikeouts

Player	G	IP	W	L	ERA	SO
Bob Muncrief	36	214.1	13	9	3.65	67
George Caster	32	104.1	3	7	5.00	36
Johnny Allen	20	67.0	2	5	6.58	27

==== Relief pitchers ====
Note: G = Games pitched; W = Wins; L = Losses; SV = Saves; ERA = Earned run average; SO = Strikeouts

Player	G	W	L	SV	ERA	SO
Jack Kramer	29	4	3	2	5.16	20
Bill Trotter	29	4	2	0	5.98	17
Fritz Ostermueller	15	0	3	0	4.50	20
Maury Newlin	14	0	2	1	6.51	10
Archie McKain	8	0	1	1	8.10	2
Emil Bildilli	2	0	0	0	11.57	2
Hooks Iott	2	0	0	0	9.00	1

== Farm system ==
Level	Team	League	Manager
AA	Toledo Mud Hens	American Association	Zack Taylor and Fred Haney
A1	San Antonio Missions	Texas League	Marty McManus
B	Meridian Eagles	Southeastern League	Bennie Tate
B	Springfield Browns	Illinois–Indiana–Iowa League	Art Scharein
C	St. Joseph Autos	Michigan State League	Elmer Kirchoff
C	Youngstown Browns	Middle Atlantic League	Joe Bilgere and Len Schulte
C	St. Joseph Ponies/Carthage Browns	Western Association	Walter Holke, Gus Albright and Dennis Burns
D	Lafayette White Sox	Evangeline League	Bobby Goff
D	Mayfield Browns	KITTY League	Bill Hornsby
D	Paragould Browns	Northeast Arkansas League	Sam Hancock and Gus Albright
D	Pueblo Rollers	Western League	Pug Griffin

St. Joseph franchise transferred to Carthage and renamed, June 3, 1941
