= Maury Newlin =

American baseball player (1914–1978)

- Pitcher
- Born: June 22, 1914; Bloomingdale, Indiana, U.S.
- Died: August 14, 1978 (aged 64); Houston, Texas, U.S.
- Batted: Right Threw: Right

MLB debut
- September 20, 1940, for the St. Louis Browns

Last MLB appearance
- September 17, 1941, for the St. Louis Browns

MLB statistics
- Win–loss record: 1–2
- Earned run average: 6.51
- Strikeouts: 13
- Stats at Baseball Reference

Teams
- St. Louis Browns (1940–1941)

Maurice Milton Newlin (June 22, 1914 – August 14, 1978) was an American Major League Baseball pitcher who played for the St. Louis Browns in 1940 and 1941. He served in the military during World War II, from 1942 to 1945.
