= Jack Conway (baseball) =

American baseball player (1918–1993)

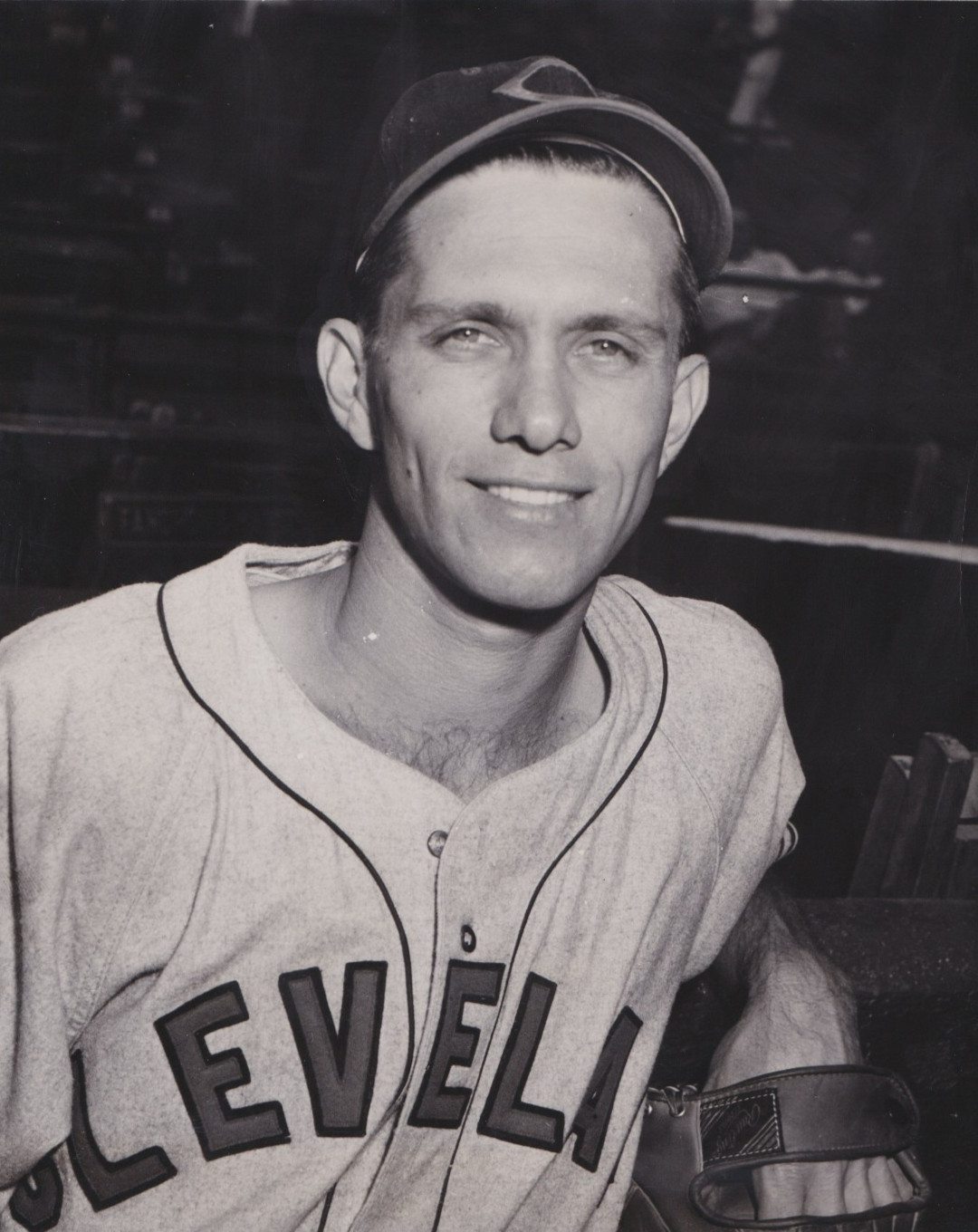
- Conway with the Cleveland Indians in 1946
- Second baseman / Shortstop
- Born: July 30, 1918; Bryan, Texas, U.S.
- Died: June 11, 1993 (aged 74); Waco, Texas, U.S.
- Batted: Right Threw: Right

MLB debut
- September 9, 1941, for the Cleveland Indians

Last MLB appearance
- July 31, 1948, for the New York Giants

MLB statistics
- Batting average: .223
- Home runs: 1
- Runs batted in: 27
- Stats at Baseball Reference

Teams
- Cleveland Indians (1941, 1946–47); New York Giants (1948)

Jack Clements Conway (July 30, 1918 – June 11, 1993) was an American Major League Baseball infielder who played for four seasons. He played for the Cleveland Indians in 1941 and from 1946 to 1947, and the New York Giants in 1948.
