= Buck Ross =

American baseball player (1915–1978)

- Pitcher
- Born: February 3, 1915; Norwood, North Carolina, U.S.
- Died: November 23, 1978 (aged 63); Charlotte, North Carolina, U.S.
- Batted: Right Threw: Right

MLB debut
- May 7, 1936, for the Philadelphia Athletics

Last MLB appearance
- September 10, 1945, for the Chicago White Sox

MLB statistics
- Win–loss record: 56–95
- Earned run average: 4.94
- Strikeouts: 360
- Stats at Baseball Reference

Teams
- Philadelphia Athletics (1936–1941); Chicago White Sox (1941–1945)

Lee Ravon "Buck" Ross (February 3, 1915 – November 23, 1978) was an American professional baseball pitcher. He played in Major League Baseball (MLB) from 1936 to 1945 for the Philadelphia Athletics and Chicago White Sox. Ross was born in Norwood, North Carolina.
