= Jack Hallett =

American baseball player (1914–1982)

- Pitcher
- Born: November 13, 1914; Toledo, Ohio, U.S.
- Died: June 11, 1982 (aged 67); Toledo, Ohio, U.S.
- Batted: Right Threw: Right

MLB debut
- September 13, 1940, for the Chicago White Sox

Last MLB appearance
- April 29, 1948, for the New York Giants

MLB statistics
- Win–loss record: 12–16
- Earned run average: 4.05
- Strikeouts: 128
- Stats at Baseball Reference

Teams
- Chicago White Sox (1940–1941); Pittsburgh Pirates (1942–1943, 1946); New York Giants (1948)

Jack Price Hallett (November 13, 1914 – June 11, 1982) was an American professional baseball pitcher who played for the Chicago White Sox, Pittsburgh Pirates and New York Giants of Major League Baseball between 1940 and 1948. He was a 6 ft 4 in (1.93 m), 215 pounds (98 kg) right-hander.

Hallett, a native of Toledo, Ohio, made his big-league debut on September 13, 1940 at the age of 25 for the White Sox, wearing #28. In two games that year, he went 1 and 1 with a 6.43 ERA in 14 innings of work.

In 1941, Hallett spent time as both a starter and reliever. He posted a 5 and 5 record and a 6.03 ERA. On December 9, 1941, Hallett was traded from the White Sox with Mike Kreevich to the Philadelphia Athletics for Wally Moses. He went from the A's to the Toronto Maple Leafs in the International League in the spring of 1942 before being traded in September to the Pirates. He appeared in only 3 games in 1942, starting all of them. He had an 0 and 1 record, but he completed two of the games he appeared in. In 1943, with his number changed to 40, he posted a tiny 1.70 ERA in 47 innings of work, but still had a losing record of 1 and 2.

Hallett missed 1944 and 1945, serving in the Pacific with the Navy during World War II.

Hallett came back after his time in the military and posted a solid 3.29 ERA in 115 innings of work for the Pirates in 1946. Still, his record was only 5 and 7. His number was 39.

After playing for the minor league Indianapolis Indians in 1947, Hallett came back in 1948 and finished his big league career with the Giants at the age of 33. In four innings of work in 1948 and wearing number 40, he posted a 4.50 ERA. His final game was on April 29.

Overall, Hallett went 12-16 in 277.2 innings of work over a span of six seasons. He appeared in a total of 73 games, starting 24 of them and completing 11 of his starts (2 of his complete games were shutouts). His career ERA was 4.05. He was a fairly solid batter, hitting .238 with one home run in 80 career at-bats. He was a perfect fielder, committing zero errors in 60 total chances (14 putouts, 46 assists). His career pitching statistics are most similar to those of Jim Britton.

Hallett died in 1982 at the age of 67 in Toledo, Ohio. He was buried at the United Church of Christ Cemetery in Holgate, Ohio.
