= Johnny Sturm =

American baseball player (1916–2004)

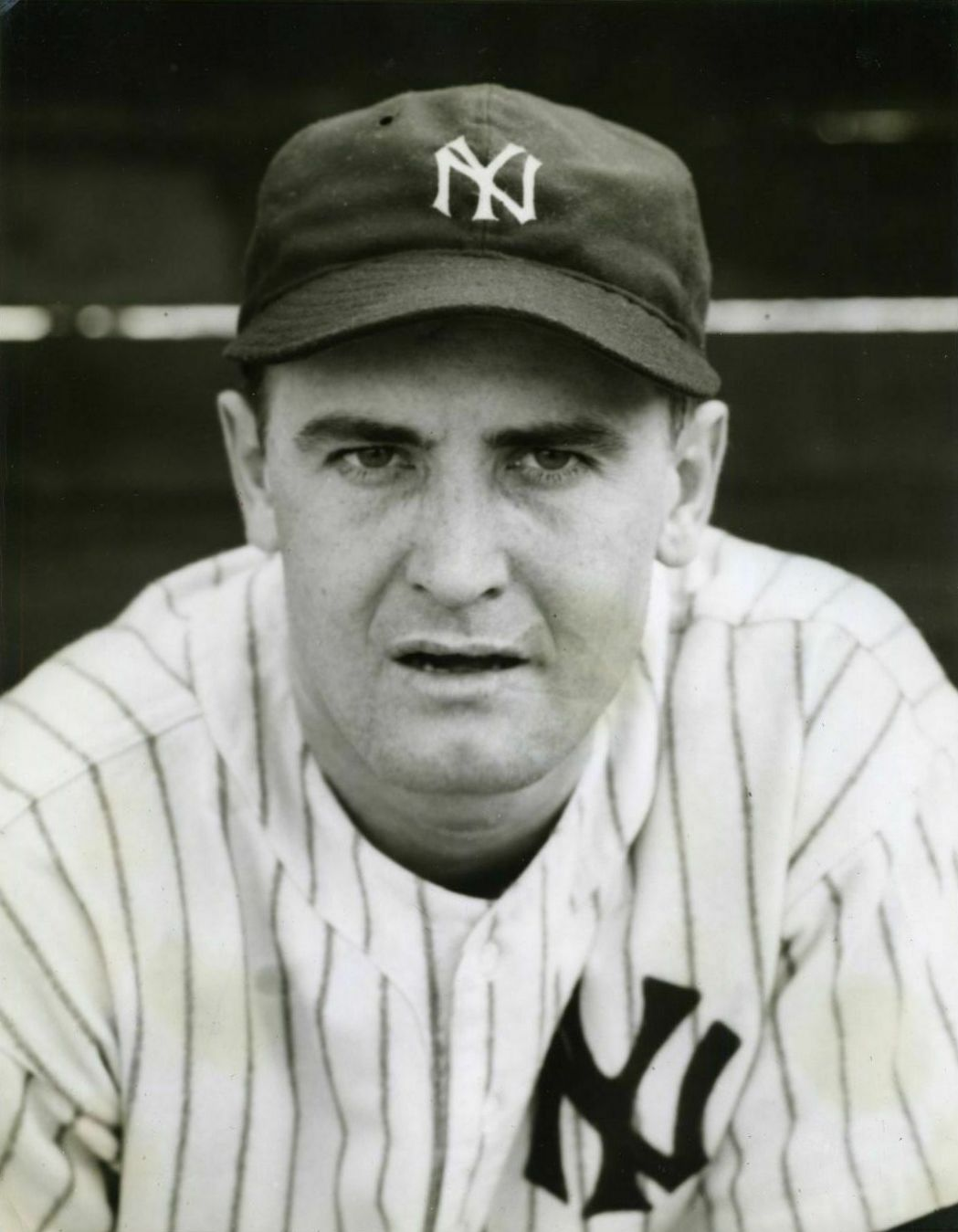
- Sturm with the New York Yankees in 1941
- First baseman
- Born: January 23, 1916; St. Louis, Missouri, U.S.
- Died: October 8, 2004 (aged 88); St. Louis, Missouri, U.S.
- Batted: Left Threw: Left

MLB debut
- April 14, 1941, for the New York Yankees

Last MLB appearance
- September 28, 1941, for the New York Yankees

MLB statistics
- Batting average: .239
- Home runs: 3
- Runs batted in: 36
- Stats at Baseball Reference

Teams
- New York Yankees (1941)

Career highlights and awards
- World Series champion (1941)

John Peter Joseph Sturm (January 23, 1916 – October 8, 2004) was an American Major League Baseball player. He played with the New York Yankees during the 1941 season as their starting first baseman.

== Biography ==
Sturm was born in St. Louis, Missouri, in 1916. He attended Roosevelt High School in St. Louis and also played semi-pro baseball.

Sturm started his professional career in 1936 in the New York Yankees organization. In 1939 and 1940, he played for the American Association's Kansas City Blues alongside the double play combination of Phil Rizzuto and Jerry Priddy. The Blues won two league championships, and Sturm hit over .300 in both seasons. He joined the Yankees in 1941, replacing Babe Dahlgren at first base.

Sturm sat on the bench early in the season but broke into the lineup after the other infielders – including Hall of Famers Rizzuto and Joe Gordon – got off to slow starts. Sturm hit just .239 for the Yankees but still batted first in the lineup the rest of the way. He later claimed to have a back injury that year. He did, however, hit .286 in the 1941 World Series; the Yankees defeated the Brooklyn Dodgers in five games. After the season, Sturm enlisted in the United States Army and served in World War II. He was out of professional baseball from 1942 to 1945 and lost the tip of his right index finger in a tractor accident.

In 1946, Sturm tried to come back to the major leagues but broke his wrist. He played and managed in the minors for the rest of the decade, hitting .360 for the Joplin Miners in 1948. The Yankees also assigned him to scout in the Kansas-Oklahoma-Missouri region. In this capacity, Sturm became the man who first recommended Mickey Mantle to the Yankees. He invited Mantle to try out for Joplin in 1949, and sportswriter Allen Barra writes, "It's likely he was the one who spurred Lee MacPhail into moving aggressively to sign Mantle."

Sturm retired as a player-manager in 1949. In later years, he was a scout for the Houston Colt .45s, Cincinnati Reds, and Boston Red Sox. He was elected into the Greater St. Louis Hall of Fame.

Sturm was married and had three children. He died of congestive heart failure in 2004.
