= Larry Rosenthal =

American baseball player (1910–1992)

- Outfielder
- Born: May 21, 1910; St. Paul, Minnesota, U.S.
- Died: March 4, 1992 (aged 81); Woodbury, Minnesota, U.S.
- Batted: Left Threw: Left

MLB debut
- June 20, 1936, for the Chicago White Sox

Last MLB appearance
- June 22, 1945, for the Philadelphia Athletics

MLB statistics
- Batting average: .263
- Home runs: 22
- Runs batted in: 189
- Stats at Baseball Reference

Teams
- Chicago White Sox (1936–1941); Cleveland Indians (1941); New York Yankees (1944); Philadelphia Athletics (1944–1945)

Lawrence John Rosenthal (May 21, 1910 – March 4, 1992) was an American professional baseball outfielder in the 1930s and 1940s. He first played with the Chicago White Sox in 1936, and hit .281 in 317 at bats. He actually started out spectacularly, getting on base three or more times in 19 of his first 50 games, two more than the next four players, who include Joe DiMaggio. He played with the White Sox until 1941, when he was purchased by the Cleveland Indians. He then spent two years in the minor leagues, returning to the majors in 1944. Rosenthal played poorly, and never had much playing time afterward, although he played briefly for the New York Yankees and Philadelphia Athletics.

Rosenthal is second all-time (Jeremy Giambi) for most walks with fewer than 1500 career ABs.

He died on March 4, 1992 and is buried at Resurrection Cemetery in Mendota Heights, Minnesota.
