= Johnny Humphries =

American baseball player (1915–1965)

- Pitcher
- Born: June 23, 1915; Clifton Forge, Virginia, U.S.
- Died: June 24, 1965 (aged 50); New Orleans, Louisiana U.S.
- Batted: Right Threw: Right

MLB debut
- May 8, 1938, for the Cleveland Indians

Last MLB appearance
- July 28, 1946, for the Philadelphia Phillies

MLB statistics
- Win–loss record: 52–63
- Earned run average: 3.78
- Strikeouts: 317
- Stats at Baseball Reference

Teams
- Cleveland Indians (1938–1940); Chicago White Sox (1941–1945); Philadelphia Phillies (1946)

John William Humphries (June 23, 1915 – June 24, 1965) was an American professional baseball pitcher in Major League Baseball from 1938 to 1946. Born in Clifton Forge, Virginia, he played for the Cleveland Indians, Chicago White Sox, and Philadelphia Phillies. Humphries played college baseball at North Carolina. When Humphries made his Major League debut with the Indians in 1938, he was thought to have the best fastball in the American League. He made 45 pitching appearances as a rookie in 1938 to lead the American League, beating out Bobo Newsom of the St. Louis Browns by one. Between July 13 and July 26, 1942, Humphries pitched ten or more innings in four consecutive starts. As of 2020, no other pitcher had ever pitched more than nine innings in more than three consecutive appearances.

He died in 1965 in New Orleans, Louisiana.
