= 1941 in baseball =

The following are the baseball events of the year 1941 throughout the world.

== Headline events of the year ==
- The Chicago Cubs became the first Major League Baseball franchise to install a music organ for fan entertainment. It was one of the only innovations ever to be introduced at Wrigley Field, which 47 years later earned a backward reputation as the last ballpark to install lights.
- Joe DiMaggio hits in 56 consecutive games. After being hitless in the 57th game, he hit safely in 16 more consecutive games for a streak of 72 of 73 games.
- Ted Williams ended the season with a .406 batting average. No hitter (qualifying for the batting title) has hit over .400 since the 1941 season.

== Champions ==
=== Major League Baseball ===
- World Series: New York Yankees over Brooklyn Dodgers (4–1)
- All-Star Game, July 8 at Briggs Stadium: American League, 7–5

=== Other champions ===
- IV Amateur World Series: Venezuela
- Negro League Baseball All-Star Game: East, 8–3

== Awards and honors ==
- MLB Most Valuable Player Award
  - Joe DiMaggio, New York Yankees, OF
  - Dolph Camilli, Brooklyn Dodgers, 1B
- The Sporting News Most Valuable Player Award
  - Joe DiMaggio, New York Yankees, OF
  - Dolph Camilli, Brooklyn Dodgers, 1B
- The Sporting News Player of the Year Award
  - Ted Williams (AL) – OF, Boston Red Sox
- The Sporting News Manager of the Year Award
  - Billy Southworth (NL) – St. Louis Cardinals

== Statistical leaders ==
Any team shown in small text indicates a previous team a player was on during the season.
Any team shown in italics indicates a team a player was on from a different league. Any stat from said different league is not calculated to determine the league leader.

	American League		National League		Negro American League		Negro National League	
Stat	Player	Total	Player	Total	Player	Total	Player	Total
AVG	Ted Williams (BOS)	.406	Pete Reiser (BRO)	.343	Lyman Bostock (BBB)	.466	Monte Irvin (NE)	.387
HR	Ted Williams (BOS)	37	Dolph Camilli (BRO)	34	Willard Brown (KCM); Ted Strong (KCM)	6	Buck Leonard (HOM)	13
RBI	Joe DiMaggio (NYY)	125	Dolph Camilli (BRO)	120	Willard Brown (KCM)	32	Bill Hoskins (BEG/NBY/MEM)	50
W	Bob Feller (CLE)	25	Kirby Higbe (BRO); Whit Wyatt (BRO)	22	Hilton Smith (KCM)	9	Terris McDuffie (HOM)	11
ERA	Thornton Lee (CWS)	2.37	Elmer Riddle (CIN)	2.24	Gready McKinnis (BBB)	1.04	Bill Byrd (BEG)	2.23
K	Bob Feller (CLE)	260	Johnny Vander Meer (CIN)	202	Hilton Smith (KCM)	57	Dave Barnhill (NYC)	109

== Major league baseball final standings ==
=== American League final standings ===
American League
Team	W	L	Pct.	GB	Home	Road
New York Yankees	101	53	.656	—	51‍–‍26	50‍–‍27
Boston Red Sox	84	70	.545	17	47‍–‍30	37‍–‍40
Chicago White Sox	77	77	.500	24	38‍–‍39	39‍–‍38
Cleveland Indians	75	79	.487	26	42‍–‍35	33‍–‍44
Detroit Tigers	75	79	.487	26	43‍–‍34	32‍–‍45
St. Louis Browns	70	84	.455	31	40‍–‍37	30‍–‍47
Washington Senators	70	84	.455	31	40‍–‍37	30‍–‍47
Philadelphia Athletics	64	90	.416	37	36‍–‍41	28‍–‍49

Locations of teams for the 1941 American League season
American League

=== National League final standings ===
National League
Team	W	L	Pct.	GB	Home	Road
Brooklyn Dodgers	100	54	.649	—	52‍–‍25	48‍–‍29
St. Louis Cardinals	97	56	.634	2½	53‍–‍24	44‍–‍32
Cincinnati Reds	88	66	.571	12	45‍–‍34	43‍–‍32
Pittsburgh Pirates	81	73	.526	19	45‍–‍32	36‍–‍41
New York Giants	74	79	.484	25½	38‍–‍39	36‍–‍40
Chicago Cubs	70	84	.455	30	38‍–‍39	32‍–‍45
Boston Braves	62	92	.403	38	32‍–‍44	30‍–‍48
Philadelphia Phillies	43	111	.279	57	23‍–‍52	20‍–‍59

Locations of teams for the 1941 National League season
National League

== Negro league baseball final standings ==
All Negro leagues standings below are per MLB and Seamheads.

=== Negro American League final standings ===
vs. Negro American League						vs. Major Black teams			
Negro American League	W	L	T	Pct.	GB	W	L	T	Pct.
Kansas City Monarchs	40	16	1	.711	—	57	22	2	.716
Birmingham Black Barons	30	20	1	.598	7	36	26	1	.579
Memphis Red Sox	28	27	2	.509	11½	41	36	3	.531
St. Louis–New Orleans Stars	18	23	2	.442	14½	22	32	3	.412
Jacksonville Red Caps	14	28	0	.333	19	15	30	2	.340
Chicago American Giants	12	28	2	.310	20	20	38	2	.350

Locations of teams for the 1941 Negro American League season
Negro American League

=== Negro National League final standings ===
vs. Negro National League						vs. Major Black teams			
Negro National League	W	L	T	Pct.	GB	W	L	T	Pct.
Baltimore Elite Giants	27	14	0	.659	—	60	26	0	.698
^{(1)} Homestead Grays	26	18	1	.589	2½	58	31	3	.647
Newark Eagles	21	15	1	.581	3½	35	33	1	.514
^{(2)} New York Cubans	14	15	0	.483	7	23	40	3	.371
New York Black Yankees	12	21	0	.364	11	21	37	0	.362
Philadelphia Stars	13	30	0	.302	15	17	54	0	.239

^{(1)} First half champion ^{(2)} Second half champion

==== Negro National League postseason ====
- Homestead Grays over New York Cubans (3–1)
Locations of teams for the 1941 Negro National League season
Negro National League
Note: Homestead Grays play their games equally between Washington, D.C. and Pittsburgh.

=== Independent teams final standings ===
The Negro American League All Star team played against two league teams.

vs. All Teams
Independent Clubs	W	L	T	Pct.	GB
NAL All Stars	1	1	0	.500	—

== Events ==
=== January ===
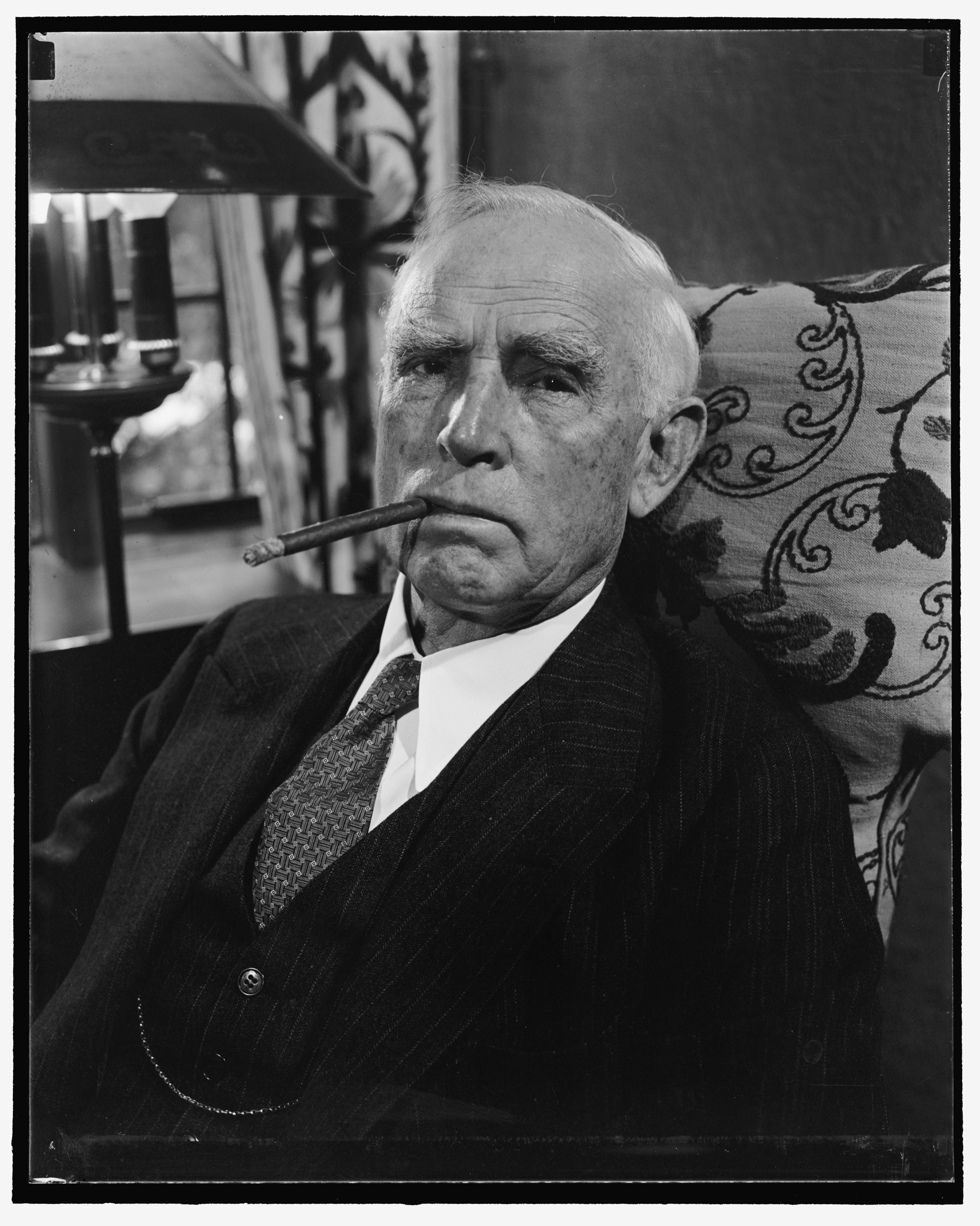
Clark Griffith

- January 4 – Clark Griffith, president of the Washington Senators, sells the contract of right-hander Joe Haynes to the Chicago White Sox. Haynes, 23, is engaged to Griffith's niece Thelma; the couple will marry in the fall.
- January 8 – The Baseball Writers' Association of America announces in The Sporting News the poll results for its 1940 Major League All-Star team: Hank Greenberg‚ LF; Joe DiMaggio‚ CF; Ted Williams‚ RF; Frank McCormick‚ 1B; Joe Gordon‚ 2B; Luke Appling‚ SS; Stan Hack‚ 3B; Harry Danning‚ C. The pitchers are Bob Feller‚ Bucky Walters‚ and Paul Derringer.
- January 21 – Bob Feller signs with the Cleveland Indians for a reported $30,000.
- January 31 – The Brooklyn Dodgers sign .340 lifetime hitter and future Hall of Famer Paul Waner; "Big Poison," 37, had been released by his original employers, the Pittsburgh Pirates, last December 5 after 15 seasons, 2,154 games and 2,868 hits.

=== February ===
- February 3 – The Boston Red Sox sell the contract of right-hander Joe Heving to the Cleveland Indians. Primarily a relief pitcher, the 40-year-old Heving went 12–7 (4.01) with 21 games finished and three saves for the 1940 Bosox.
- February 4 – Pitcher Tot Pressnell changes address for the third time since the end of the 1940 season when the Cincinnati Reds sell his contract to the Chicago Cubs. Pressnell, 34, had previously been dealt by the Brooklyn Dodgers to the St. Louis Cardinals in November, then to Cincinnati in December. He'll get into 29 games (28 in relief) for the 1941 Cubs.
- February 7 – The Chicago White Sox and Cleveland Indians exchange right-handed pitchers, with Chicago obtaining Johnny Humphries, 25, for relief pitcher Clint Brown, 37.
- February 8 – With Boston Bees majority owner Charles F. Adams ordered by Commissioner of Baseball Kenesaw Mountain Landis to dispose of his stock in the franchise—among Adams' holdings is race track Suffolk Downs—a surprise candidate offers to buy the National League club: its field manager, Casey Stengel. The 50-year-old Stengel, a successful oil industry investor off the baseball diamond, has teamed with Brooklyn jewelry manufacturer Max C. Meyer and enters the bidding to acquire Adams' controlling interest.
- February 19 – The Cleveland Indians pay ousted manager Ossie Vitt a $2,500 bonus on the orders of the Commissioner's office. Vitt, fired last October after missing the American League pennant by a single game and key players' embarrassing "Crybaby Rebellion" against his managerial regime, was due the bonus because of an attendance clause in his contract.
- February 25 – Days after the start of spring training, the New York Yankees send Babe Dahlgren to the Boston Bees in a cash transaction. Dahlgren, who took over the Bombers' first base job from Lou Gehrig on May 2, 1939, after Gehrig's historic 2,130-consecutive-games-played streak, will be replaced in the New York lineup by rookie Johnny Sturm.

=== March ===
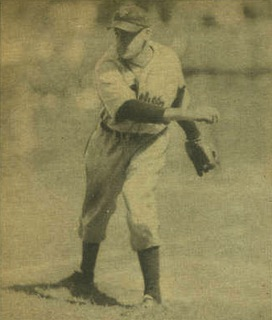
Hugh Mulcahy

- March 4 – Grace Comiskey becomes the first woman to become president of an American League club when she is elected to the post by the Chicago White Sox' board of directors. The team's presidency had been vacant since the death of her husband, J. Louis Comiskey, on July 18, 1939; the ChiSox, founded by J. Lou's father at the turn of the 20th century, recently reverted to full Comiskey family control after a period of trusteeship overseen by the First National Bank of Chicago.
- March 8 – Philadelphia Phillies pitcher Hugh Mulcahy becomes the first Major League Baseball player drafted into the armed forces via the Selective Service system established last year by President Franklin D. Roosevelt in anticipation of World War II. More than 100 major leaguers will be drafted within the next two years; two of them, Washington Senators outfielder Elmer Gedeon and Philadelphia Athletics catcher Harry O'Neill, will be killed in action.
- March 9 – The Brooklyn Dodgers slap a $200 fine on onetime staff ace Van Lingle Mungo and temporarily kick him off the team after Mungo "falls off the water wagon" during spring training in Havana. The inebriated pitcher brawls with a jealous husband after he's discovered, naked, with the man's wife and another woman in a room at the Dodgers' hotel. Banished from Cuba, Mungo, 29, is eventually reinstated by the Dodgers, but appears in only two games before he's sent down to Montreal on May 15, never to return to the Brooklyn squad.
- March 19 – The Boston Bees purchase the contract of third baseman Ducky Detweiler from the Wilmington Blue Rocks of the Interstate League.
- March 23 – New York Yankees outfielder Joe DiMaggio, a hold out and late arrival in spring training, plays in his first Grapefruit League game.
- March 28 – The Yankees sell the contract of right-hander Steve Sundra to the Washington Senators. Sundra, 31, went 11–1 (2.76) for the world-champion 1939 Bombers before suffering through a terrible 1940 campaign.

=== April ===
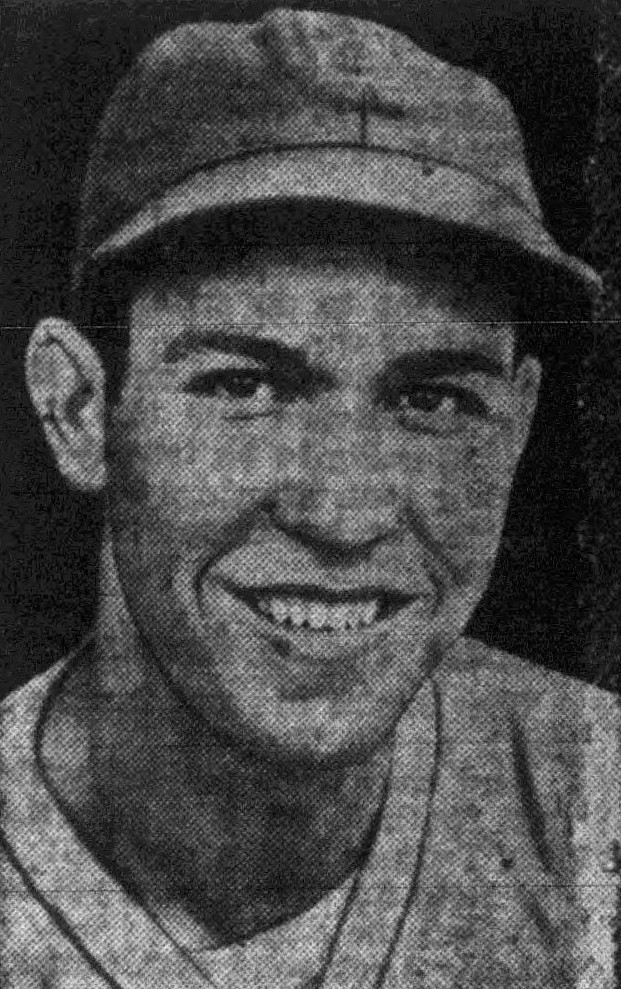
Pete Reiser

- April 13 – In their final pre-season tune-up, the New York Yankees win their third game in a row over the host Brooklyn Dodgers at Ebbets Field, 3–0. The Dodgers had come into this final series with an 11-game winning streak, including four triumphs against the Yankees at their training camp.
- April 14 – The 1941 MLB season kicks off with the Presidential Opener in Washington. Left-hander Marius Russo tosses a three-hitter and Joe DiMaggio drives home the winning tally in the top of the first, as the Yankees defeat the Senators, 3–0, at Griffith Stadium before 32,000 fans. Franklin D. Roosevelt throws the ceremonial first pitch for the ninth time.
- April 15:
  - The Cincinnati Reds open defense of their World Series championship with a 7–3 defeat at the hands of the St. Louis Cardinals at Crosley Field before 34,940. Lon Warneke gets the better of Paul Derringer, and five home runs are struck, including blows from Enos Slaughter and Johnny Mize of St. Louis (eventual Hall of Famers); Cincinnati first baseman Frank McCormick hits two homers himself.
  - Shortstop Lou Stringer commits four errors in his debut with the Chicago Cubs, setting a National League record for a player in his first game. Stringer does better on offense, adding a pair of hits and two runs batted in. Chicago defeats the Pittsburgh Pirates, 7–4, backed by strong pitching from starter Claude Passeau and a clutch home run from Bill "Swish" Nicholson. The win is Jimmie Wilson's first as the Cubs' manager.
  - Two expected NL contenders make a deal, when the Brooklyn Dodgers reacquire pitcher Newt Kimball from the St. Louis Cardinals in a cash transaction.
- April 20:
  - Behind six runs batted in from Joe DiMaggio and five from Joe Gordon—who has temporarily changed defensive positions, from second base to first—the New York Yankees bash the Philadelphia Athletics at Shibe Park, 19–5. The 19 runs will be the most scored by a single team in any AL or NL game in 1941.
  - The New York Giants attract 56,314 fans to the Polo Grounds, to date the biggest crowd ever to view an MLB game at the Upper Manhattan stadium, but they lose to the arch-rival Brooklyn Dodgers, 10–9, when Dolph Camilli tallies an unearned run in the top of the ninth.
  - The Dodgers become the first club in Major League Baseball history to wear protective headgear. Each batter's cap features a plastic lining designed to fend off the effects of beanballs. It's a cautious response to the numerous beanball wars that plagued the 1940 season which saw players such as Joe Medwick and Billy Jurges, among others, hospitalized. However, the liners are so thin, they are hardly noticeable, and most players disdain using them.
- April 22 – Restless general manager Larry MacPhail picks up another arm for the Brooklyn bullpen: he's two-time NL saves leader Mace Brown, 31, acquired from the Pittsburgh Pirates in a cash transaction.
- April 23 – The Dodgers remain in the headlines when standout sophomore center-fielder Pete Reiser is struck in the head by an Ike Pearson fastball in the third inning of Brooklyn's 4–0 victory over the Philadelphia Phillies at Ebbets Field. Reiser, 22, is carried off on a stretcher and admitted to Caledonian Hospital. Expected to be out of action for two weeks, he will return to a Dodger box score in seven days. It's the first life-threatening injury of Reiser's big-league career, which will be marked by comebacks from serious injuries caused by beanballs and his fearless play.
- April 29:
  - J. A. Robert Quinn, newly installed principal owner, and the reorganized board of directors of Boston's National League baseball club, known as the Bees since 1936, vote to immediately return to its previous nickname, the Braves. Its home ballpark, known since 1936 as either "National League Park" or "The Beehive," returns to its original moniker, Braves Field. The new ownership group, which takes control of the Braves from Charles F. Adams, includes local contractors Louis R. Perini, C. Joseph Maney and Guido Rugo—the "Three Little Steam Shovels"—as minority investors.
  - The New York Giants return righty Bump Hadley, 36 and in his 16th season, to the New York Yankees, who in turn send him on to the Philadelphia Athletics for cash considerations.
- April 30 – The Chicago White Sox purchase the contracts of pitcher Buck Ross from the Athletics and outfielder Myril Hoag from the St. Louis Browns.

=== May ===
- May 1 – Shibe Park hosts another visiting team's offensive explosion, this time against its National League tenants, as the Pittsburgh Pirates amass 23 hits, six for extra bases, and thrash the host Philadelphia Phillies, 15–2. The Bucs' 23 hits tie for the most by a team in an MLB game in 1941; the feat will be equalled at the same ballpark by the Phillies themselves, when they overwhelm the visiting New York Giants, 18–2, on August 17.
- May 3 – In only his third MLB appearance and first starting assignment, 30-year-old rookie Hank Gornicki of the St. Louis Cardinals hurls the first of the big-league season's 11 one-hit games, allowing a sixth-inning single to Stan Benjamin and walking five in a 6–0 shutout of the struggling Phillies at Shibe Park.
- May 6:
  - Slugger Hank Greenberg of the Detroit Tigers belts two home runs (the 248th and 249th of his career) off right-hander Tiny Bonham, leading his team to a 7–4 triumph over the New York Yankees at Briggs Stadium. Tomorrow Greenberg, 30, will report for duty in the United States Army; he had been classified 1–A for the U.S. military draft. He will be discharged from the Army on December 5—two days before the Attack on Pearl Harbor—then re-enlist in the USAAF on February 2, 1942. Greenberg will next appear in a major-league box score on July 1, 1945.
  - The Brooklyn Dodgers, 16–6 and a half game behind the St. Louis Cardinals three weeks into the season, acquire sought-after second baseman Billy Herman from the Chicago Cubs for $65,000 and two players: infielder Johnny Hudson and outfielder Charlie Gilbert. Herman, 31, is a seven-time All-Star who will be elected to the Baseball Hall of Fame in 1975.
- May 7 – The Pittsburgh Pirates deal future Hall-of-Fame outfielder Lloyd Waner to the Boston Braves for hurler Nick Strincevich. Waner, 35, has collected over 2,300 hits and batted .319 in his decade-and-a-half in a Pittsburgh uniform.
- May 11 – The Tigers unconditionally release "Rowdy Richard" Bartell, their shortstop during 1940's pennant-winning campaign. Bartell, 33, has lost his starting job to Frank Croucher; he'll sign with a former team, the New York Giants, as a free agent May 15.
- May 14 – Branch Rickey obtains a crafty starting pitcher, Harry Gumbert, 31, for his St. Louis Cardinals, sending hurler "Fiddler Bill" McGee to the Giants. New York also surrenders former Redbird Paul "Daffy" Dean and cash in the transaction. Gumbert, who also has a colorful nickname ("Gunboat"), will win 11 games for the Cardinals this season and contribute to two pennants and the 1942 World Series championship before he departs in June 1944.

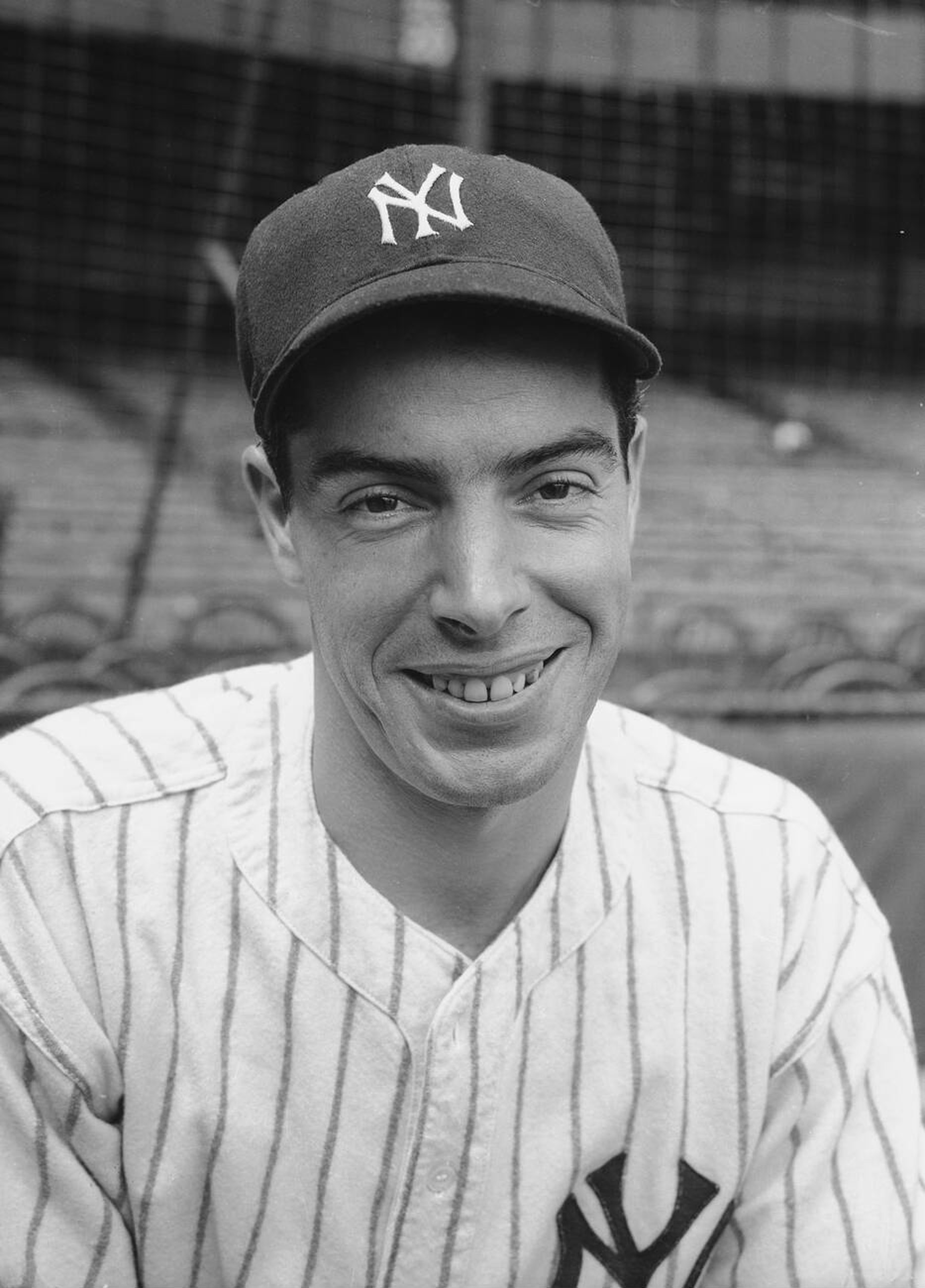
Joe DiMaggio in September 1941

- May 15:
  - In the first inning at Yankee Stadium, Joe DiMaggio singles off left-hander Eddie Smith of the Chicago White Sox; he had gone 0-for-3 against Mel Harder of the Cleveland Indians in yesterday's contest. His safety today against the ChiSox starts DiMaggio's all-time record, 56-game hitting streak, which will be finally halted July 17 in Cleveland by another southpaw named Smith.
  - The Detroit Tigers purchase the contract of outfielder Rip Radcliff from the St. Louis Browns. Radcliff, 35, tied for the American League lead in hits with 200 last season, and his .342 batting average ranked fourth in the Junior Circuit.
  - The Browns reacquire catcher and future Hall of Famer Rick Ferrell in one-for-one trade with the Washington Senators, sending right-hander Vern Kennedy in exchange.
- May 20 – Chicago White Sox outfielder Taft Wright sets an AL record after driving in at least one run in 13 consecutive games. During the streak, Wright recorded 22 runs batted in, although in six of the games he knocked in a run without collecting a hit.
- May 24 – "Big Poison" (Paul Waner) and "Little Poison" (Lloyd Waner), the brother act that starred as members of the Pittsburgh Pirates from 1927 through 1940, are reunited when the Boston Braves sign elder sibling Paul, 38, as a free agent; he had been released by the Brooklyn Dodgers on May 11. The Waner reunion, however, will last less than three weeks when Boston ships Lloyd to the Cincinnati Reds for hurler Johnny Hutchings.

=== June ===
- June 1 – Mel Ott's two-run homer, the 400th of his Hall-of-Fame career, and his 1,500th RBI gives the New York Giants a 3–2 win over the Cincinnati Reds.
- June 2 – Upon arriving in Detroit by train for their series against the Tigers, members of the New York Yankees are gathered together and informed that Lou Gehrig has died in his sleep, age 37, at his home in Riverdale, Bronx. Thousands of mourners will file past Gehrig's coffin tomorrow when he lies in state in churches in Manhattan and Riverdale; they include Babe Ruth, who breaks down and weeps during the sombre procession.
- June 4 – Luke Sewell replaces Fred Haney as manager of the seventh-place St. Louis Browns. The Browns had entered 1941 with hopes of a rare winning season, but are only 15–29 under Haney and already 12½ games behind the front-running Cleveland Indians in the American League. Sewell, 40, who spent 19 seasons as an MLB catcher, will lead a Brownie revival, going 55–55–3 for the rest of the campaign.
- June 6:
  - The New York Giants become the first team in MLB history to use plastic batting helmets during a doubleheader against the Pittsburgh Pirates. The Giants' batters appear comfortable in their new headgear, but they lose both games by scores of 5–4 and 4–3.
  - Dizzy Dean, recently named a coach by the Chicago Cubs, is ejected twice by umpire Beans Reardon from tonight's 4–1 loss to the Brooklyn Dodgers at Ebbets Field for arguing an interference ruling. Given the initial heave-ho by Reardon, Dean heads for the Chicago clubhouse, but changes his mind and returns to the field to resume his dispute with the umpire, who tosses him a second time. The National League office suspends the future Hall-of-Fame pitcher for five games and fines him $50.
- June 9 – AL president Will Harridge announces that the circuit's eight clubs will permit all armed forces personnel to attend their games free of charge for the remainder of the 1941 season.
- June 13 – Three-time NL All-Star catcher Babe Phelps is suspended by the Brooklyn Dodgers after, citing health concerns, he refuses to accompany his teammates on a two-week "Western" road-trip; manager Leo Durocher, furious, vows, "I don't want him on my ball club." Phelps, 33, has batted .315 in 581 games spanning 6½ seasons for Brooklyn, but has lost his regular job to Mickey Owen. His tenure with the Dodgers is over, he goes home to Maryland, and he'll be traded to the Pittsburgh Pirates in December.
- June 14 – A widely anticipated match between the top two teams in the American League sees the second-place New York Yankees defeat the league-leading Cleveland Indians, 4–1, before 44,161 in the Bronx, to cut Cleveland's margin to three full games. The Yanks' Atley Donald out-duels Bob Feller, whose personal winning streak is stopped at seven games; he's now 13–3 (2.53). Joe DiMaggio's double in the third inning drives home what proves to be the deciding run, and extends his hitting streak to 27 straight games.
- June 21 – The Detroit Tigers sign University of Michigan outfielder Dick Wakefield to an unprecedented $51,000 professional contract, the highest amount so far bestowed on an amateur free agent in MLB annals. Wakefield, 20, will make his MLB debut as a pinch hitter June 26, but spend most of the summer in the Class B Piedmont League.
- June 23 – Future Hall-of-Fame owner Bill Veeck, 27, buys his first professional baseball team when he and former Chicago Cubs first baseman and manager Charlie Grimm purchase the Milwaukee Brewers of the American Association. Until Veeck leaves for military service after the 1943 season, Milwaukee will be a "laboratory" for the young co-owner's stream of innovations designed to reinvigorate a sports franchise—painting and improving the stadium, speaking with and listening to fans, and attracting and entertaining them at the park with creative promotions.
- June 29 – Although he goes only two-for-nine in today's doubleheader against the Washington Senators at Griffith Stadium, Joe DiMaggio sets a new American League (and modern-era MLB) record consecutive-game hitting streak, with a "knock" in each contest, and helps his New York Yankees to a sweep, 9–4 and 7–5. With his skein now at 42 straight games, DiMaggio breaks George Sisler's old mark of 41, set in 1922. His next target is the all-time and NL mark of 44 games, held by Willie Keeler since 1897.

=== July ===
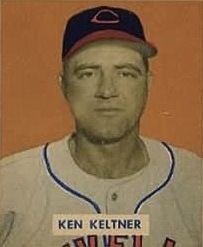
Ken Keltner

- July 2 – In the fifth inning of today's 8–4 triumph over the Boston Red Sox at Yankee Stadium, Joe DiMaggio connects for his 18th home run of the season—extending his hitting streak to 45 consecutive games, and breaking the 44-year-old, all-time record set by "Wee Willie" Keeler of the 19th-century Baltimore Orioles of the National League. DiMaggio victimizes Bosox right-hander Dick Newsome with his three-run clout.
- July 8:
  - At the All-Star Game at Detroit's Briggs Stadium, Boston's Ted Williams, hitting .405 at the break, homers off Chicago Cubs pitcher Claude Passeau with two outs and two on in the ninth inning to give the American League a dramatic, come-from-behind 7–5 victory. Williams' four RBIs are matched by National League shortstop Arky Vaughan, who hits home runs in the seventh and the eighth.
  - There are two pennant races at the half-way point of the MLB season. In the AL, the New York Yankees (48–26–2) lead the Cleveland Indians (46–31) by 3½ games; in the National, the Brooklyn Dodgers (50–24–1) hold a two-game edge over the St. Louis Cardinals (48–28).
- July 17 – Joe DiMaggio's all-time-record, consecutive-games hitting streak ends at 56 against the Indians before 67,468 at Cleveland Stadium. Tribe hurlers Al Smith and Jim Bagby Jr. keep DiMaggio out of the hit column, but third baseman Ken Keltner plays the ultimate spoiler role by making two outstanding defensive plays on DiMaggio's hard-hit ground balls in the first and seventh innings.
  - Between May 15 (when DiMaggio's streak began) and today, his New York Yankees went 42–12–2, and jumped from fourth place to a seven-game lead in the AL standings. DiMaggio batted .408 (91-for-223), hit 15 home runs, four triples and 16 doubles, knocked in 55 runs, and drew 24 walks; he struck out only five times.
  - Beginning tomorrow, DiMaggio will kick off a new hitting streak that reaches 16 games until he's stopped August 3 by knuckleballer Johnny Niggeling of the St. Louis Browns.
- July 19 – At Sportsman's Park, George McQuinn hits for the cycle and scores three runs in the Browns' 9–3 triumph over the Boston Red Sox. It's the only "cycle" in the AL or NL during 1941.
- July 20 – In the American League's longest game by innings of 1941, the New York Yankees score six runs in the top of the 17th to break a six–all tie and defeat the Detroit Tigers, 12–6, at Briggs Stadium. Johnny Murphy throws 82/3 innings of scoreless relief, and homers from Charlie Keller and Tommy Henrich highlight the game-winning outburst.
- July 25 – Lefty Grove of the Boston Red Sox earns his 300th, and final, career win, defeating the Cleveland Indians, 10–6, at Fenway Park; the irascible, 41-year-old Grove throws a complete game and allows five earned runs, but Jim Tabor and Ted Williams lead the Bosox' offense; both men hit homers, Tabor knocks in four runs, and Williams's two hits raise his batting mark from .397 to .400. Grove's final MLB outing will come September 28 in Boston's final game; he'll be elected to the Hall of Fame in 1947.
- July 30 – Trailing the St. Louis Cardinals by three lengths in the NL, the Brooklyn Dodgers obtain veteran right-hander Johnny Allen on waivers from the St. Louis Browns. A fierce competitor, Allen, 36, has posted a 119–58 (3.82) record in ten AL seasons.
- July 31 – The New York Yankees conclude a scorching, 25–4 month of July by sweeping the Detroit Tigers in a doubleheader in The Bronx. They've increased their AL margin to 12 games over second-place Cleveland.

=== August ===
- August 11 – In one of 1941's wildest brawls, pitcher Elden Auker and infielder Alan Strange of the St. Louis Browns and first baseman Joe Kuhel of the Chicago White Sox are ejected by umpire John Quinn from the opening game of a Comiskey Park doubleheader. In the seventh, Auker hits batter Kuhel in the shoulder with a pitch; as he trots to first base, Kuhel accuses the hurler of throwing at him and they tangle on the baseline, "trading a dozen blows" before Auker is restrained; Strange then jumps Kuhel. The beleaguered Chicago first baseman challenges Strange to meet him under the stands to settle matters. Auker, meanwhile, is taken into police custody to protect him from an angry mob. The White Sox win the contest, 14–9. The second game is played without incident.
- August 17 – At Braves Field, Whit Wyatt of the Brooklyn Dodgers hurls 81/3 perfect innings before Boston's Phil Masi singles to break Wyatt's spell. The Brooklyn right-hander then retires pinch-hitters Bama Rowell and Frank Demaree to complete his nine-strikeout, 3–0 shutout triumph.
- August 19 – Umpire Jocko Conlan ejects Pittsburgh Pirates manager Frankie Frisch from the second game of a doubleheader after Frisch appears on the field waving an umbrella to protest playing conditions at Ebbets Field. American artist Norman Rockwell will later transform the humorous incident into a famous oil painting, titled Bottom of the Sixth.
- August 20 – Yet another veteran hurler joins the Brooklyn Dodgers for the pennant race, when they acquire southpaw Larry French, 33, on waivers from the Chicago Cubs.
- August 30 – Lon Warneke pitches 1941's only MLB no-hitter, leading the St. Louis Cardinals to a 2–0 victory over the Cincinnati Reds at Crosley Field. Warneke fans two, walks one, and two Cincinnati batters reach base on Cardinal errors.

=== September ===
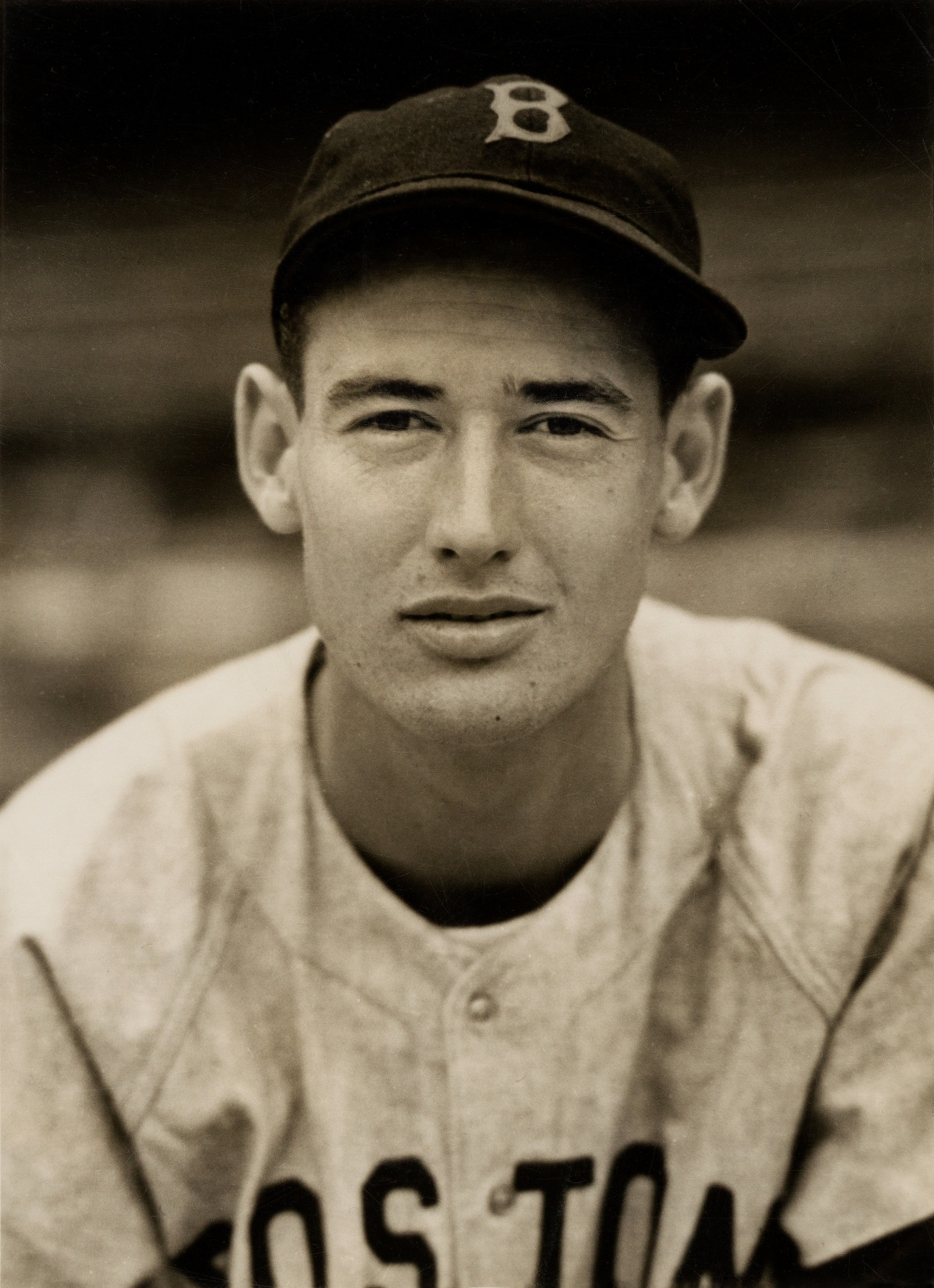
Ted Williams

- September 1 — The season's final month begins with the St. Louis Cardinals (81–45–1) and Brooklyn Dodgers (82–46–2) separated by just .002 percentage points as co-leaders of the National League. In contrast, the American League race is all but over: the New York Yankees (88–44–2) are 19½ lengths ahead of the Boston Red Sox and 20 up on the Chicago White Sox.
- September 4 – The Yankees win their 12th AL pennant in the past 21 seasons, defeating the Red Sox, 6–3, at Fenway Park. It's the earliest clinching game in Junior Circuit history.
- September 15 – In the National League's longest game, by innings, of the season, the Brooklyn Dodgers and Cincinnati Reds battle for 16 scoreless innings at Crosley Field, until Pete Reiser leads off the visitors' 17th with a home run off tiring starter Paul Derringer; aided by two Cincinnati errors, the Dodgers tally four more runs and ultimately win, 5–1, to gain a half-game in the pennant race. Johnny Allen goes 15 scoreless innings as Brooklyn's starter, with bullpen ace Hugh Casey getting the victory.
- September 17 – Twenty-year old Stan Musial makes his major league debut with the St. Louis Cardinals in a contest against the Boston Braves at Sportsman's Park. In his second at bat, he drills a two-RBI double against knuckleballer Jim Tobin, and later adds another hit, as the Redbirds win, 3–2, to sweep a doubleheader and move to a single game behind front-running Brooklyn.
- September 25 – The Brooklyn Dodgers win their first NL pennant since 1920 and the sixth in their history, defeating the Boston Braves, 6–0, on the road behind the hurling of Whit Wyatt and hitting of Pete Reiser, setting up their first of seven "Subway Series" against the New York Yankees. Wyatt wins his 22nd game and Reiser bangs out two hits, to secure the Senior Circuit's batting title (.343).
  - An estimated 10,000 delirious Brooklyn fans throng Grand Central Station to welcome the Dodgers home. But team president Larry MacPhail is not among them, nor is he on the train from Boston; he had spent the day in New York, and ordered the engineer to stop at 125th Street to enable him to board before it reached its mid-town terminus. Manager Leo Durocher overruled the order, not knowing it came from his volatile boss. As a result, an infuriated MacPhail, stranded at an uptown platform while his team is feted, fires Durocher on the night of the Dodgers' great triumph—only to "un-fire" his skipper the next morning.
- September 28 – Ted Williams enters the season's closing day hitting .3995, which would customarily be "rounded up" to a .400 average. However, Williams decides to play in both games of a doubleheader at Shibe Park against the Philadelphia Athletics to make his feat unquestioned; he goes six for eight in the two games and raises his average to .406—as of 2025, the last time any player has batted .400 or higher in a season.
- September 29 – The Fort Custer team wins the national amateur championship of the American Baseball Congress with a 3–2 victory over a Charlotte, North Carolina, team. It's the last time the amateur World Series was held until after World War II.
- September 30 – In the major-league draft, held immediately following the regular season during this era, the New York Giants select 24-year-old right-handed pitcher Sal Maglie from the Detroit Tigers. Almost a decade later—after World War II service, a postwar stint in the "outlaw" Mexican League, and a prolonged suspension for "jumping" his "Organized Baseball" contract—a grizzled Maglie will become an ace starting pitcher for the early 1950s Giants. Other notable future big-leaguers who change teams today include Hi Bithorn, Russ Christopher and Clyde Kluttz.

=== October ===
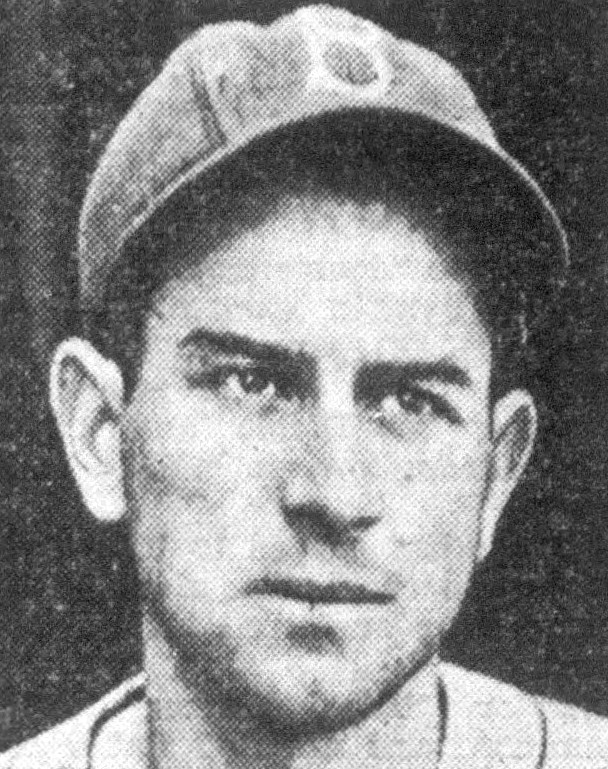
Mickey Owen

- October 5 — In Game 4 of the 1941 World Series, with the New York Yankees holding a two-games-to-one edge, the Brooklyn Dodgers lead 4–3 and seem poised to square the competition at two victories each. Down to their last out in the visitors' ninth, the Yankees' Tommy Henrich swings and misses at strike three from ace Dodger relief pitcher Hugh Casey. But catcher Mickey Owen can't handle Casey's pitch—initially described as a curveball but later reported to be a spitter; it skips to the backstop, Henrich takes first base, and the rattled Dodgers surrender four unearned runs to absorb a crushing, 7–4 defeat that turns the tide of the Fall Classic.
- October 6 – In the World Series' fifth game, the Yankees defeat the deflated Dodgers, 3–1, at Ebbets Field to win their fifth title in six years, and their ninth overall, four victories to one. Tiny Bonham throws a complete-game four-hitter, and Tommy Henrich delivers an insurance run with his fifth-inning homer. Baseball writers who cover the Series name second baseman Joe Gordon its most valuable player.
- October 8 – The Chicago Cubs release 16-year veteran right-hander Charlie Root, whose 201 victories in a Cub uniform are the most in club annals. Root, 42, pitched for four National League champions (1929, 1932, 1935, 1938), but went 0–3 (6.75) in six World Series games, and was on the mound for Babe Ruth's alleged "called shot" during Game 3 of the 1932 World Series. He'll remain in the game as a minor-league manager and MLB pitching coach.

=== November ===
- November 4 – Dolph Camilli, hard-hitting Brooklyn Dodgers first baseman, is the BBWAA's landslide choice as Most Valuable Player in the National League for 1941. With 19 of 24 first-place votes and 300 points, he surpasses teammate Pete Reiser's three votes and 183 points. Camilli, 34, led the NL in home runs (34) and runs batted in (120); Reiser, 22, won the league's batting title (.343) and also led in runs scored (117) and slugging percentage (.558).
- November 11 – Joe DiMaggio of the New York Yankees is named 1941's American League MVP over Ted Williams of the Boston Red Sox (15 of 24 first-place votes and 291 points for DiMaggio, 8/24 and 254 for Williams). DiMaggio, who established his 56-game hitting streak as an MLB record between mid-May and mid-July, batted .357 with 30 home runs and led the AL in RBI (125), while Williams closed the season with a MLB-leading .406 average, while leading the AL in home runs (37), runs (135), on-base percentage (.553) and slugging (.735). Neither DiMaggio's 56-game streak nor a hitter attaining the .400 plateau have been equalled since.
- November 24 – A week before minor league baseball's annual meetings, the International League comes to the aid of a flagship club, the Toronto Maple Leafs. A charter member of the IL that's played continuously since 1895, the Leafs have recently struggled in the standings and at the gate, play no Sunday home games due to local blue laws, and have been sold to new owners who've pledged to keep the team alive. Under the assistance plan, each of the seven other IL teams will offer the gate receipts of one Sunday home game to the Toronto club. In addition, the Leafs will switch parent teams from the talent-poor Philadelphia Athletics to the Pittsburgh Pirates. Even though they still finish below .500, the Leafs' attendance will jump from 57,815 to 178,327 in 1942, under their new general manager, 24-year-old Lee MacPhail.
- November 25:
  - Cleveland Indians shortstop Lou Boudreau is appointed the club's new manager at age 24—becoming the second youngest player to manage an MLB team in the 20th century. Coincidentally, he succeeds Roger Peckinpaugh at the Cleveland helm; Peckinpaugh is the century's youngest manager, directing the New York Yankees for 20 games at the close of the 1914 season at the age of 23. Now 50, he moves up to the Indians' front office as general manager, replacing Cy Slapnicka.
  - Doc Prothro, who since 1939 had the misfortune of managing three of the worst teams in Philadelphia Phillies history (cumulative record of 138–320, an average of almost 107 losses a season), reveals that he does not expect to be invited back for 1942. Later this week, coach Hans Lobert will be named Prothro's successor.

=== December ===
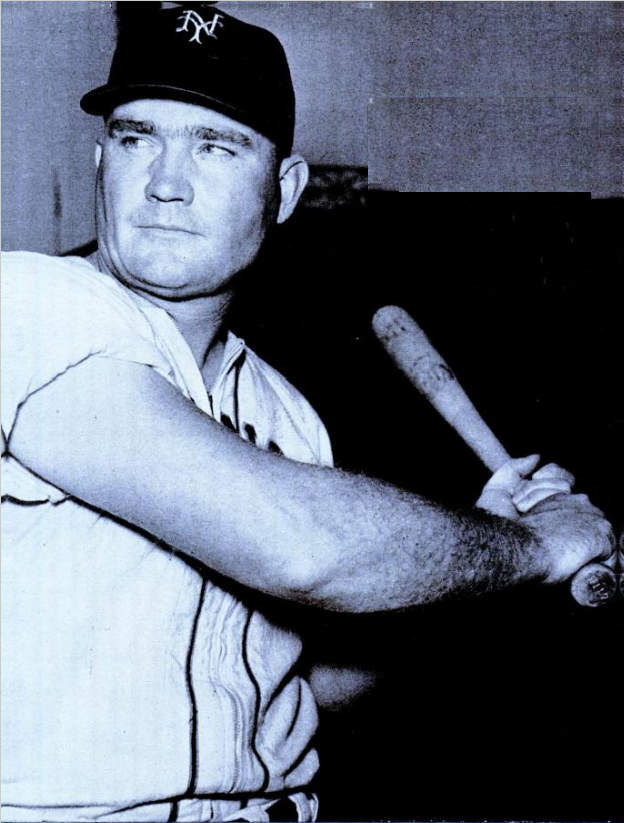
Johnny Mize

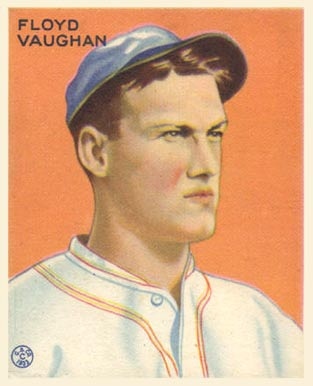
Arky Vaughan

- December 2 – The New York Giants name future Hall-of-Fame slugger Mel Ott as their new manager. "Master Melvin," 32, is still in the prime of his playing career as the Giants' everyday right-fielder and eight-time National League All-Star; he'll lead the NL in home runs in 1942. Only the third Giants' skipper since 1902, Ott succeeds another Hall of Famer, Bill Terry, who moves into the front office as director of the team's scouting corps and farm system.
- December 3 – The Giants, who suffered their second straight losing season in 1941, kick off a busy winter trading market by reacquiring center-fielder Hank Leiber from the Chicago Cubs for right-hander Bob Bowman.
- December 4:
  - The Brooklyn Dodgers bid a final goodbye to volatile former star pitcher Van Lingle Mungo by trading him to Minneapolis of the American Association, along with catcher Tony Giuliani, for young left-hander Joe Hatten. Mungo had spent most of 1941 with Montreal of the International League.
  - Two veteran catchers change teams in cash transactions, when the Cincinnati Reds purchase the contract of Rollie Hemsley, 34, from the Cleveland Indians and the St. Louis Cardinals acquire Ray Mueller, 29, from the Pittsburgh Pirates and assign him to their Sacramento farm club.
- December 5 – A day after the Mueller transaction, the Pirates also sell the contract of 1940 NL batting champion Debs Garms to the Cardinals, who assign him to Sacramento. After spending next season in the Pacific Coast League, Garms, 34, will be recalled by the Redbirds to serve as a backup outfielder for their 1943 and 1944 pennant-winners.
- December 7 – The Attack on Pearl Harbor plunges the formerly neutral United States into World War II: tomorrow, the U.S. Congress issues a formal declaration of war against the Empire of Japan and, on December 11, Nazi Germany and Fascist Italy declare war on the U.S. More than 4,500 professional baseball players will serve in the U.S. armed forces before the conflict's official end in September 1945; at least 150 minor leaguers and three former major leaguers will lose their lives. Canada, at war with Germany since September 1939, will lose at least 19 players, including men from the semi-pro ranks, to the conflict. An estimated 72 Japanese former baseball players will die on the opposing side.
- December 8 – On the eve of the major-league winter meetings in Chicago—and with the U.S. now at war in the Pacific—Donald Lee Barnes, owner of the St. Louis Browns, abandons his so-far-secret plan to seek American League approval to move his franchise from St. Louis to Los Angeles. With the war emergency, AL owners (including Barnes himself) vote unanimously against the transfer, and a planned news conference in the "City of Angels" never takes place. The Browns will remain in St. Louis for another dozen seasons before moving to Baltimore in 1954.
- December 9:
  - The Boston Braves acquire minor-league outfielder Tommy Holmes, 24, from the New York Yankees for two "players to be named later," first baseman Buddy Hassett, 30, and outfielder Gene Moore, 32. Although he's batted over .300 for three straight seasons with the Yanks' Newark farm team, Holmes has not been able to crack the Bombers' varsity roster; he'll spend ten years as a Brave (and bat .303 in 1,289 games), finish runner-up in the 1945 National League MVP balloting (a year in which he racks up a 37-game hitting streak, most in the NL since 1897), and help Boston win the 1948 NL pennant.
  - The Philadelphia Athletics trade veteran outfielder Wally Moses to the Chicago White Sox for pitcher Jack Hallett and outfielder Mike Kreevich.
- December 10:
  - The St. Louis Cardinals send catcher/outfielder Don Padgett to the rival Brooklyn Dodgers for pitcher Kemp Wicker, infielder Jack Burman and $7,500. Padgett will enlist in the United States Navy in March 1942, miss four seasons performing World War II service, and won't make his Brooklyn debut until April 20, 1946.
  - The Cincinnati Reds purchase the contracts of outfielders Morrie Arnovich and Jo-Jo Moore from the New York Giants; in a separate transaction, the Reds sell the contract of former starting third baseman Billy Werber to the Giants. When Arnovich is inducted into the United States Army on March 5, 1942, his transaction is nullified; he misses four full seasons performing military service.
- December 11:
  - The Giants, who have been hinting at an imminent blockbuster trade since the minor-league meetings two weeks ago, make good on their word, obtaining future Hall-of-Fame first baseman Johnny Mize from the Cardinals for three players—right-hander Bill Lohrman, catcher Ken O'Dea and first baseman Johnny McCarthy—and $150,000. Mize, 28 and known as "The Big Cat," has already made four NL All-Star teams, is a two-time home run champion (1939, 1940) and one-time batting champion (1939). Although he'll miss the 1943–1945 campaigns serving in the U.S. Navy, he'll return to the Giants in 1946 and tie for the NL home run crown in both 1947 and 1948.
  - The Cleveland Indians purchase the contract of veteran righty Vern Kennedy from the Washington Senators.
- December 12:
  - The Brooklyn Dodgers pull off a headline-grabbing trade of their own, acquiring shortstop and future Hall of Famer Arky Vaughan from the Pittsburgh Pirates for four players: pitcher Luke Hamlin, catcher Babe Phelps, infielder Pete Coscarart and outfielder Jimmy Wasdell. Vaughan, 29, has hit .324 (and, in 1935, won the NL batting crown) and been selected to eight All-Star squads during his decade in a Pittsburgh uniform.
  - The Detroit Tigers obtain five-time AL All-Star centerfielder Doc Cramer, along with infielder Jimmy Bloodworth, from the Washington Senators for shortstop Frank Croucher and right-fielder Bruce Campbell.
- December 13 – The Senators trade left-hander Ken Chase and outfielder Johnny Welaj to the Boston Red Sox for righty Jack Wilson and outfielder Stan Spence. It's a shrewd deal for Washington, as Spence makes four AL All-Star teams and hits .296 in five seasons with the "Griffs".

== Births ==
=== January ===
- January 3 – John Sullivan
- January 16 – Joe Bonikowski
- January 18 – Mickey McGuire
- January 22 – Dave Leonhard
- January 27 – Nick Willhite

=== February ===
- February 5 – Roberto Rodríguez
- February 11 – Sammy Ellis
- February 12 – Mike Joyce
- February 13 – Jim Brenneman
- February 17 – Dave Wissman
- February 18 – Leo Marentette
- February 20 – Clyde Wright
- February 23
  - Ron Hunt
  - Gordy Lund
- February 25 – Dave Vineyard
- February 26 – George Kopacz

=== March ===
- March 5 – Phil Roof
- March 7 – Glen Clark
- March 17 – Vic Voltaggio
- March 18 – Pat Jarvis
- March 20 – Pat Corrales

=== April ===
- April 1 – Dick Kenworthy
- April 4 – Eddie Watt
- April 13 – John Stephenson
- April 14
  - Frank Cipriani
  - Pete Rose
- April 21 – Dick Green
- April 22 – Steve Jones
- April 25 – Chuck Harrison

=== May ===
- May 2 – Clay Carroll
- May 5 – Tommy Helms
- May 10 – Ken Berry
- May 12 – Floyd Weaver
- May 19 – Mike Lee
- May 21 – Bobby Cox
- May 24 – Bill Wakefield
- May 27 – Dan Ardell
- May 29 – John Kennedy
- May 30 – John Miller

=== June ===
- June 1 – Dean Chance
- June 2 – Bob Saverine
- June 5 – Duke Sims
- June 12 – Gerry Arrigo
- June 13 – Marcel Lachemann
- June 15 – Bruce Dal Canton
- June 18 – Paul Brown
- June 20 – Luis Alcaráz
- June 26 – Gil Garrido
- June 28
  - Len Boehmer
  - Al Downing
  - Fred Talbot
- June 29
  - John Boccabella
  - Larry Stahl

=== July ===
- July 3 – Casey Cox
- July 8
  - Gary Kroll
  - Ken Sanders
- July 12 – Dick Rusteck
- July 13 – Don Bryant
- July 21
  - Nelson Mathews
  - Gary Waslewski
- July 22 – Bart Zeller
- July 26 – Carroll Sembera
- July 30 – Bob Barton

=== August ===
- August 6 – Ray Culp
- August 9 – Paul Lindblad
- August 13 – Jim French
- August 15 – Tommie Reynolds
- August 16
  - Gene Brabender
  - Bill Edgerton
  - Larry Loughlin
- August 17 – Boog Powell
- August 19 – Fred Lasher
- August 23
  - Marty Martínez
  - John Morris
- August 26 – Fred Wenz
- August 30
  - Carmen Fanzone
  - Archie Moore

=== September ===
- September 2 – Jerry Crider
- September 4
  - Ken Harrelson
  - Bernie Smith
- September 11 – Larry Bearnarth
- September 15 – Jim Barbieri
- September 18 – Dick Dietz
- September 20 – Dennis Ribant
- September 29
  - Jeff James
  - Rich Reese

=== October ===
- October 5 – Andy Kosco
- October 9 – Jeoff Long
- October 13 – Jim Price
- October 14 – Art Shamsky
- October 16 – Tim McCarver
- October 21 – Ron Davis
- October 22 – Wilbur Wood
- October 30 – Jim Ray Hart
- October 31 – Ed Spiezio

=== November ===
- November 2 – Billy Connors
- November 5 – Rudy Schlesinger
- November 7 – Clarence Jones
- November 13 – Mel Stottlemyre
- November 14 – Darrell Sutherland
- November 18 – Sterling Slaughter
- November 25 – Mike Ryan
- November 26 – Jeff Torborg
- November 27 – Al Raffo
- November 28 – Fritz Fisher
- November 29 – Bill Freehan

=== December ===
- December 5 – Bob Sprout
- December 7 – Rupe Toppin
- December 8 – Ed Brinkman
- December 9 – Darold Knowles
- December 11 – Dámaso Blanco
- December 12 – Allan Lewis
- December 16 – Adolfo Phillips
- December 21 – Paul Casanova
- December 23 – Ken Hubbs
- December 27 – Phil Gagliano
- December 29
  - Bruce Brubaker
  - John Upham

== Deaths ==
=== January ===
- January 6 – Charley O'Leary, 58, shortstop for the Detroit Tigers, St. Louis Cardinals and St. Louis Browns between 1904 and 1913 (plus a one-game cameo in 1934), who coached for 21 years with the Cardinals (1913–1917), New York Yankees (1921–1930), Chicago Cubs (1931–1932) and Browns (1934–1937).
- January 20 – Jack Lelivelt, 55, outfielder for the Senators, Highlanders, Yankees and Naps from 1909 to 1914, who also set an International League record with a 42-game hitting streak in 1912, which was broken by Brandon Watson in 2007.
- January 24 – Tommy Bond, 84, Irish 19th century pitcher who posted a 234–163 record for six different clubs from 1874 to 1884, and also was the first Triple Crown winner in 1877, while leading the National League with 40 wins, 170 strikeouts, and a 2.11 ERA.
- January 25 – Chris Lindsay, 62, first baseman who played from 1905 to 1906 with the Detroit Tigers.
- January 28 – John Johnson, 71, pitcher for the 1894 Philadelphia Phillies.

=== February ===
- February 2 – Ambrose McGann, 73, infielder/outfielder for the 1895 Louisville Colonels.
- February 8 – Frank Beck, 79, pitcher who played for the Pittsburgh Alleghenys and Baltimore Monumentals during the 1884 season.
- February 10 – Eddie Boyle, 66, catcher for the Louisville Colonels and Pittsburgh Pirates in the 1890s.
- February 17 – Happy Iott, 64, outfielder for the 1903 Cleveland Naps.
- February 18 – Tom Connelly, 43, backup outfielder for the New York Yankees in 1920 and 1921.
- February 21 – Frank Corridon, 60, pitcher who played from 1904 to 1910 for the Cubs, Phillies and Cardinals, who is credited with being the first major league pitcher to use the spitball.
- February 23 – Lou Kolls, 48, American League umpire, 1933 until his death; worked 1,195 league games, 1936 All-Star Game and 1938 World Series; former pro football player.
- February 28 – Wilson Collins, 51, outfielder for the Boston Braves from 1913 to 1914.

=== March ===
- March 1 – Ivey Wingo, 50, catcher for the St. Louis Cardinals and the Cincinnati Reds for all or part of 17 seasons spanning 1911–1929, who hit .571 as a member of the 1919 World Series champions.
- March 3 – Doc Parker, 68, pitcher for the Chicago Colts and Cincinnati Reds between the 1893 and 1901 seasons.
- March 8 – Buzz Wetzel, 46, pitcher for the 1927 Philadelphia Athletics and a minor league player/manager who in 1921 guided the London Tecumsehs to the Michigan-Ontario Baseball League championship.
- March 10 – Doc Hazleton, 64, first baseman for the 1902 St. Louis Cardinals.
- March 11 – Pi Schwert, 47, catcher for the New York Yankees from 1914 to 1915.
- March 15 – Al Froehlich, 56, catcher who appeared in one game on July 2, 1909, for the Philadelphia Phillies.
- March 25 – Eddie Hickey, 68, third baseman for the 1901 Chicago Orphans.
- March 31 – Kit McKenna, 68, pitcher who played from 1898 to 1899 for the Brooklyn Bridegrooms and Baltimore Orioles.

=== April ===
- April 4 – Alex Jones, 71, pitcher for the Alleghenys, Colonels, Senators, Phillies and Tigers from 1889 to 1903.
- April 12 – Frederick Boardman, 90, outfielder who appeared in one game for the 1874 Baltimore Canaries of the National Association, the forerunner to the National League.
- April 13 – Germany Schultz, 47, outfielder from 1912 to 1925 for every National League club with the exception of the New York Giants; later a minor league manager and MLB executive; son Joe Jr. was a major league coach with four clubs and manager of the 1969 Seattle Pilots.
- April 16 – Howard Wakefield, 57, catcher who played from 1905 to 1907 with the Cleveland Indians and Washington Senators.

=== May ===
- May 1 – Roxy Snipes, 44, pinch-hitter for the 1923 Chicago White Sox.
- May 8 – Bill Joyce, 75, third baseman for five teams in eight seasons from 1890 to 1898 and manager of the New York Giants from 1896 through 1898, who tied for the National League home runs title with Ed Delahanty in 1896 and finished second three times.
- May 10 – Jim Pastorius, 59, pitcher from 1906 to 1909 for the Brooklyn Superbas.
- May 13 – Henry Medicus, 76, Brooklyn businessman who was co-owner of the Superbas from 1905 to 1912.
- May 15 – William Lackey, 70, pitcher for the 1890 Philadelphia Athletics.
- May 16 – Art Williams, 63, first baseman/outfielder for the 1902 Chicago Orphans.
- May 17 – Bill Husted, 74, pitcher for the 1890 Philadelphia Athletics.
- May 19:
  - Joe Gedeon, 47, second baseman for the Washington Senators, New York Yankees and St. Louis Browns from 1913 to 1920, who led the American League batters with 48 sacrifice hits in 1920, and was one of the eight players suspended for life as result of the Black Sox Scandal.
  - John Schulze, 75, catcher for the 1891 St. Louis Browns.
- May 23 – Jack Clements, 76, left-handed catcher for six different teams between 1884 and 1900, who caught 1,073 games and also is credited with being the first catcher to wear a chest protector.
- May 25 – Bob Higgins, 54, catcher who played from 1909 to 1912 for the Cleveland Naps and Brooklyn Dodgers.

=== June ===
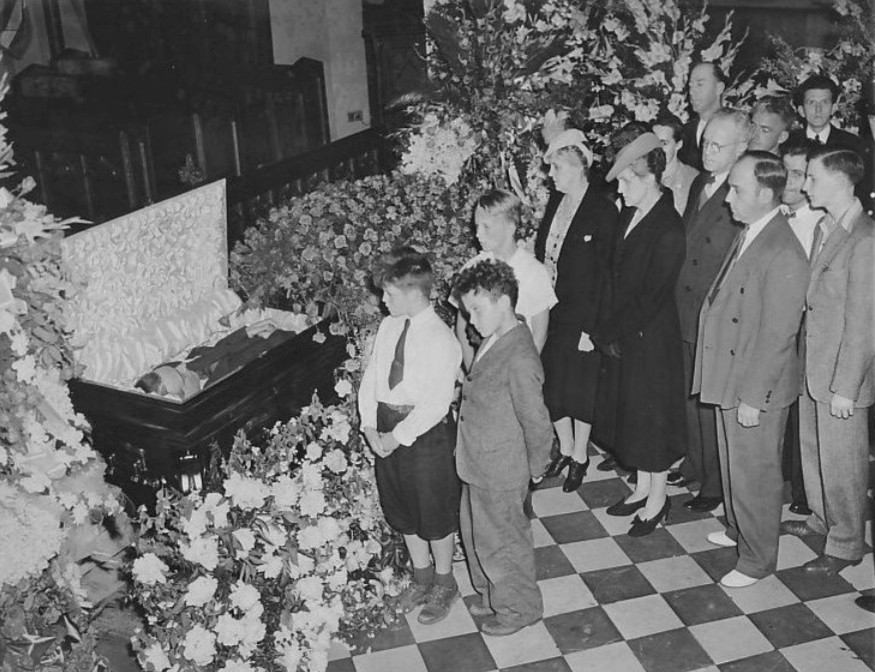
Mourners at Lou Gehrig's wake

- June 2 – Lou Gehrig, 37, Hall of Fame first baseman who played from 1923 through 1939 for the New York Yankees, a two-time Most Valuable Player and Triple Crown winner, as well as the second player to hit 400 home runs, who retired to end a record 2,130-game playing streak upon being diagnosed with ALS, the terminal illness that will be known to many as "Lou Gehrig's Disease."
- June 3 – Andy Cooper, 43, star pitcher for the Negro leagues' Detroit Stars and Kansas City Monarchs, spanning 1920 to 1939; elected to the Hall of Fame in 2006.
- June 15 – Bill Coyle, 69, pitcher for the 1893 Boston Beaneaters.
- June 16 – Mike Flynn, 69, Irish catcher who played in one game with the Boston Reds of the American Association.
- June 23 – Bill Nelson, 77, pitcher for the 1884 Pittsburgh Alleghenys.
- June 28 – Bruce Petway, 55, strong-armed catcher in the Negro leagues who played between 1906 and 1925, primarily for the Detroit Stars and Chicago American Giants.

=== July ===
- July 1 – Harry Adams, 78, umpire both in the National League (1897) and American League (1903).
- July 3 – Tom McCreery, 66, pitcher/outfielder for five different teams from 1895 to 1903, who is the only player in Major League history to hit three inside-the-park home runs in a single game.
- July 6:
  - Jack Theis, 49, pitcher for the 1920 Cincinnati Reds.
  - Lucky Wright, 61, pitcher for the 1909 Cleveland Indians.
- July 7 – Jack Gilbert, 65, outfielder who played with the Washington Senators and New York Giants in the 1898 season and for the Pittsburgh Pirates in 1904.
- July 8 – Jack Wadsworth, 73, pitcher who played for the Cleveland Spiders, Baltimore Orioles and Louisville Colonels in part of four seasons spanning 1890–1895.
- July 15:
  - Clarence Currie, 62, pitcher who played from 1902 to 1903 with the Cincinnati Reds, St. Louis Cardinals and Chicago Cubs.
  - Frank Isbell, 65, valuable utility man who played in all nine positions for the Chicago White Sox during 10 seasons 1901 to 1909.
- July 17 – Rube Kisinger, 64, pitcher for the 1902–1903 Detroit Tigers, who also led the Buffalo Bisons to their first Eastern League pennant in 1904.
- July 20 – Ralph Kreitz, 55, catcher form the 1911 Chicago White Sox.
- July 30:
  - Howie Shanks, 51, who played in all infield and outfield positions from 1912 through 1925 for the Washington Senators, New York Yankees and Boston Red Sox.
  - Mickey Welch, 82, Hall of Fame pitcher and the third hurler in Major League history to reach 300 victories, preceded only by Pud Galvin and Tim Keefe, who on August 28, 1884, struck out the first nine batters he faced to set a record that has remained untouched, while collecting at least 20 wins in nine seasons, including 17 consecutive wins in 1885 en route to a 44–11 record.
- July 31 – Jim Byrnes, 61, catcher for the 1906 Philadelphia Athletics.

=== August ===
- August 8 – Ralph Works, 53, pitcher who played from 1909 through 1912 for the Detroit Tigers and Cincinnati Reds.
- August 15 – Jacob Doyle, 85, outfielder for the 1872 Washington Nationals.
- August 26 – Stoney McGlynn, 69, pitcher for the 1906–1908 St. Louis Cardinals.

=== September ===
- September 8 – Joe Boehling, 50, pitcher who posted a 55–50 record and a 2.97 ERA in part of seven seasons from 1912 to 1920 for the Washington Senators and Cleveland Indians.
- September 23 – Tom Morrissey, 81, third baseman for the Detroit Wolverines in 1881 and the Milwaukee Brewers in 1884.
- September 24 – Lou Castro, 64, Colombian second baseman for the 1902 Philadelphia Athletics, who is regarded as the first Latin player to appear in a Major League game.
- September 27 – Monte Pfeffer, 49, infielder for the 1913 Philadelphia Athletics.
- September 29 – John B. Foster, 78, sportswriter and editor of The Spalding Guide.
- September 30 – John McPherson, 72, pitcher who played with the 1901 Philadelphia Athletics and 1904 Philadelphia Phillies.

=== October ===
- October 3 – Bert Inks, 70, 19th century pitcher who played from 1891 to 1896 for six different clubs, mainly with the Louisville Colonels.
- October 4 – Walt Justis, 58, pitcher for the 1905 Detroit Tigers.
- October 13 – George Proeser, 77, who pitched with the Cleveland Blues in 1888 and served as an outfielder for the Syracuse Stars in 1890.
- October 24 – Emmett Rogers, 71, catcher for the 1890 Toledo Maumees.
- October 25 – Bill Phillips, 72, pitcher for the Pittsburgh Alleghenys and the Cincinnati Reds of the National League in seven seasons between 1890 and 1903, who is best remembered for managing the 1914 Indianapolis Hoosiers to the Federal League pennant.
- October 29:
  - Harvey Hendrick, 43, infielder/outfielder who hit .308 for seven different teams between 1923 and 1934.
  - Wilbur Murdoch, 66, outfielder for the 1908 St. Louis Cardinals.

=== November ===
- November 5 – Varney Anderson, 75, pitcher for the Indianapolis Hoosiers and Washington Senators from 1889 to 1896.
- November 9 – Fred Worden, 47, pitcher for the 1914 Philadelphia Athletics.
- November 12 – Ernie Koob, 49, pitcher for the St. Louis Browns from 1915 to 1919, who threw a no-hitter against the Chicago White Sox on May 5, 1917.
- November 15 – Bill Karns, 65, pitcher for the 1901 Baltimore Orioles.
- November 18 – Charlie Kalbfus, 76, outfielder for the 1884 Washington Nationals.
- November 19 – Davey Dunkle, 69, pitcher for the Phillies, Senators and White Sox from 1897 to 1904.
- November 24 – John Henry, 51, catcher for the Washington Senators and Boston Braves from 1910 to 1918.
- November 27 – Rudy Schwenck, 57, pitcher for the 1909 Chicago Cubs.
- November 29 – Ed Hahn, 66, outfielder for the New York Yankees and Chicago White Sox from 1905 to 1910.
- November 30 – Steel Arm Davis, 45, hard-hitting first baseman/outfielder for the Chicago American Giants and four other Negro leagues clubs between 1920 and 1935.

=== December ===
- December 9 – Ed Mars, 75, pitcher for the 1890 Syracuse Stars of the American Association.
- December 13 – Roy Witherup, 55, pitcher who played for the Boston Beaneaters and Washington Senators in a span of four seasons between 1906 and 1909.
- December 14 – George Gillpatrick, 66, pitcher for the 1898 St. Louis Browns of the National League.
- December 16 – Bill Garfield, 74, pitcher who played with the Pittsburgh Alleghenys in 1889 and for the Cleveland Spiders in 1890.
- December 25 – George Bell, 67, pitcher who played from 1907 through 1911 for the Brooklyn Superbas and Dodgers clubs.
- December 28 – Jack Hickey, 60, starting pitcher who appeared in two games for the 1904 Cleveland Naps.
