= Eddie Smith (pitcher) =

American baseball player (1913–1994)

- Pitcher
- Born: December 14, 1913; Mansfield Township, New Jersey, U.S.
- Died: January 2, 1994 (aged 80); Willingboro Township, New Jersey, U.S.
- Batted: Switch Threw: Left

MLB debut
- September 20, 1936, for the Philadelphia Athletics

Last MLB appearance
- September 20, 1947, for the Boston Red Sox

MLB statistics
- Win–loss record: 73–113
- Earned run average: 3.82
- Strikeouts: 694

Teams
- Philadelphia Athletics (1936–1939); Chicago White Sox (1939–1943, 1946–1947); Boston Red Sox (1947)

Career highlights and awards
- 2× All-Star (1941, 1942)

Edgar Smith (December 14, 1913 – January 2, 1994) was an American professional baseball starting pitcher in Major League Baseball who played for the Philadelphia Athletics (1936–1939), Chicago White Sox (1939–1943, 1946–1947) and Boston Red Sox (1947). Smith was a switch-hitter and threw left-handed. He was born in Mansfield Township, Burlington County, New Jersey.

In a 10-season career, Smith posted a 73–113 record with 694 strikeouts and a 3.82 ERA in 1,595 2/3 innings pitched.

Joe DiMaggio started his 56-game hitting streak on May 15, 1941 by getting one hit in four at bats against Smith. Later that year, Smith was selected to represent the White Sox on the American League's All-Star team. He entered 1941 Major League Baseball All-Star Game on July 8 at Briggs Stadium as a relief pitcher in the eighth inning and allowed a two-run home run to left-handed-hitting shortstop Arky Vaughan, putting the AL at a 5–3 disadvantage. But he set down the National League squad in order in the ninth, and came away with the victory when Ted Williams hit a three-run, walk-off home run in the ninth, capping the Junior Circuit's rally.

Smith died in Willingboro Township, New Jersey, at the age of 80.
