= 1941 Major League Baseball season =

1941 MLB season
- League: American League (AL); National League (NL)
- Sport: Baseball
- Duration: Regular season: April 14 – September 28, 1941 (AL); April 15 – September 28, 1941 (NL); World Series: October 1–6, 1941
- Games: 154
- Teams: 16 (8 per league)

Regular season
- Season MVP: AL: Joe DiMaggio (NYY); NL: Dolph Camilli (BRO)
- AL champions: New York Yankees
- AL runners-up: Boston Red Sox
- NL champions: Brooklyn Dodgers
- NL runners-up: St. Louis Cardinals

World Series
- Champions: New York Yankees
- Runners-up: Brooklyn Dodgers

MLB seasons
- ← 1940 1942 →

Locations of teams for the 1941 American League season
American League
Locations of teams for the 1941 National League season
National League

The 1941 major league baseball season began on April 14, 1941. The regular season ended on September 28, with the Brooklyn Dodgers and New York Yankees as the regular season champions of the National League and American League, respectively. The postseason began with Game 1 of the 38th World Series on October 1 and ended with Game 5 on October 6. The Yankees defeated the Dodgers, four games to one, capturing their ninth championship in franchise history, since their previous in 1939. This was the first Subway Series World Series to feature the Dodgers (the previous five featured the New York Giants). Going into the season, the defending World Series champions were the Cincinnati Reds from the 1940 season.

The ninth All-Star Game was held on July 8 at Briggs Stadium in Detroit, Michigan, home of the Detroit Tigers. The American League won, 7–5.

The Boston Bees reverted their nickname to the "Braves" on April 29, the name they had prior to the 1936 season.

In addition to a five-game World Series between New York City teams, highlights of the season included Ted Williams batting .406, and Joe DiMaggio having a 56-game hitting streak; it has been called the "best baseball season ever".

== Schedule ==
The 1941 schedule consisted of 154 games for all teams in the American League and National League, each of which had eight teams. Each team was scheduled to play 22 games against the other seven teams of their respective league. This continued the format put in place since the 1904 season (except for 1919) and would be used until 1961 in the American League and 1962 in the National League.

American League Opening Day took place on April 14 with a game between the New York Yankees and Washington Senators, while National League Opening Day took place on the following day, featuring all eight teams. This was the first season since 1939 that both leagues opened on different days. The final day of the regular season was on September 28 and featured all sixteen teams, continuing the trend since the previous season. The World Series took place between October 1 and October 6.

== Rule changes ==
The 1941 season saw the following rule changes:

- In what was termed the "Baltimore Amendment", major league teams can now sign players for the purpose of assigning them to a minor-league club, with two caveats: The assignment must be between affiliated clubs, and all assignment transactions were to be reported to the commissioner.
- Despite both the National and American Leagues previously ruling that a maximum of seven night games could be played (1935 and 1939, respectively,) the St. Louis Browns had played 14 night games the previous season. Despite disagreements between the two leagues during the 1940 Winter Meetings, (the NL wanted to maintain seven days, while the AL wanted to have fewer than seven), Commissioner Kenesaw Mountain Landis reaffirmed the National League's seven night game position for both leagues.
- A national defensive service list was implemented. If players were called to active military duty, they would be placed on the list, their contracts would remain with their teams, but they would not be counted against a club's player limit.
- A two-person-maximum 60-day disabled list (called "injured list" since 2019) was created for each team. The disabled list was 60 calendar days, except after August 1.
- Rules regarding doubleheaders were clarified: doubleheaders could be scheduled beginning with the fourth Sunday of the season (both St. Louis teams were unofficially allowed to start them a week earlier).

== Teams ==
An asterisk (*) denotes the ballpark a team played the minority of their home games at

| League | Team | City | Ballpark | Capacity | Manager |
|---|---|---|---|---|---|
| American League | Boston Red Sox | Boston, Massachusetts | Fenway Park | 33,817 | Joe Cronin |
| American League | Chicago White Sox | Chicago, Illinois | Comiskey Park | 50,000 | Jimmy Dykes |
| American League | Cleveland Indians | Cleveland, Ohio | League Park | 22,500 | Roger Peckinpaugh |
| American League | Cleveland Indians | Cleveland, Ohio | Cleveland Stadium* | 78,811* | Roger Peckinpaugh |
| American League | Detroit Tigers | Detroit, Michigan | Briggs Stadium | 58,000 | Del Baker |
| American League | New York Yankees | New York, New York | Yankee Stadium | 71,699 | Joe McCarthy |
| American League | Philadelphia Athletics | Philadelphia, Pennsylvania | Shibe Park | 33,000 | Connie Mack |
| American League | St. Louis Browns | St. Louis, Missouri | Sportsman's Park | 34,023 | Fred Haney |
| American League | St. Louis Browns | St. Louis, Missouri | Sportsman's Park | 34,023 | Luke Sewell |
| American League | Washington Senators | Washington, D.C. | Griffith Stadium | 32,000 | Bucky Harris |
| National League | Boston Braves | Boston, Massachusetts | National League Park | 37,746 | Casey Stengel |
| National League | Brooklyn Dodgers | New York, New York | Ebbets Field | 35,000 | Leo Durocher |
| National League | Chicago Cubs | Chicago, Illinois | Wrigley Field | 38,396 | Jimmie Wilson |
| National League | Cincinnati Reds | Cincinnati, Ohio | Crosley Field | 29,401 | Bill McKechnie |
| National League | New York Giants | New York, New York | Polo Grounds | 56,000 | Bill Terry |
| National League | Philadelphia Phillies | Philadelphia, Pennsylvania | Shibe Park | 33,000 | Doc Prothro |
| National League | Pittsburgh Pirates | Pittsburgh, Pennsylvania | Forbes Field | 33,537 | Frankie Frisch |
| National League | St. Louis Cardinals | St. Louis, Missouri | Sportsman's Park | 34,023 | Billy Southworth |

== Standings ==
=== American League ===
American League
| Team | W | L | Pct. | GB | Home | Road |
|---|---|---|---|---|---|---|
| New York Yankees | 101 | 53 | .656 | — | 51‍–‍26 | 50‍–‍27 |
| Boston Red Sox | 84 | 70 | .545 | 17 | 47‍–‍30 | 37‍–‍40 |
| Chicago White Sox | 77 | 77 | .500 | 24 | 38‍–‍39 | 39‍–‍38 |
| Cleveland Indians | 75 | 79 | .487 | 26 | 42‍–‍35 | 33‍–‍44 |
| Detroit Tigers | 75 | 79 | .487 | 26 | 43‍–‍34 | 32‍–‍45 |
| St. Louis Browns | 70 | 84 | .455 | 31 | 40‍–‍37 | 30‍–‍47 |
| Washington Senators | 70 | 84 | .455 | 31 | 40‍–‍37 | 30‍–‍47 |
| Philadelphia Athletics | 64 | 90 | .416 | 37 | 36‍–‍41 | 28‍–‍49 |

=== National League ===
National League
| Team | W | L | Pct. | GB | Home | Road |
|---|---|---|---|---|---|---|
| Brooklyn Dodgers | 100 | 54 | .649 | — | 52‍–‍25 | 48‍–‍29 |
| St. Louis Cardinals | 97 | 56 | .634 | 2½ | 53‍–‍24 | 44‍–‍32 |
| Cincinnati Reds | 88 | 66 | .571 | 12 | 45‍–‍34 | 43‍–‍32 |
| Pittsburgh Pirates | 81 | 73 | .526 | 19 | 45‍–‍32 | 36‍–‍41 |
| New York Giants | 74 | 79 | .484 | 25½ | 38‍–‍39 | 36‍–‍40 |
| Chicago Cubs | 70 | 84 | .455 | 30 | 38‍–‍39 | 32‍–‍45 |
| Boston Braves | 62 | 92 | .403 | 38 | 32‍–‍44 | 30‍–‍48 |
| Philadelphia Phillies | 43 | 111 | .279 | 57 | 23‍–‍52 | 20‍–‍59 |

=== Tie games ===
13 tie games (6 in AL, 7 in NL), which are not factored into winning percentage or games behind (and were often replayed again) occurred throughout the season.

==== American League ====
- Boston Red Sox, 1
- Chicago White Sox, 2
- Cleveland Indians, 1
- Detroit Tigers, 1
- New York Yankees, 2
- St. Louis Browns, 3
- Washington Senators, 2

==== National League ====
- Boston Braves, 2
- Brooklyn Dodgers, 3
- Chicago Cubs, 1
- New York Giants, 3
- Philadelphia Phillies, 1
- Pittsburgh Pirates, 2
- St. Louis Cardinals, 2

== Postseason ==
The postseason began on October 1 and ended on October 6 with the New York Yankees defeating the Brooklyn Dodgers in the 1941 World Series in five games.

=== Bracket ===
| World Series |
| AL | New York Yankees | 4 |
| NL | Brooklyn Dodgers | 1 |

== Managerial changes ==
=== Off-season ===
| Team | Former Manager | New Manager |
|---|---|---|
| Chicago Cubs | Gabby Hartnett | Jimmie Wilson |
| Cleveland Indians | Ossie Vitt | Roger Peckinpaugh |

=== In-season ===
| Team | Former Manager | New Manager |
|---|---|---|
| St. Louis Browns | Fred Haney | Luke Sewell |

== League leaders ==
=== American League ===
Hitting leaders
| Stat | Player | Total |
|---|---|---|
| AVG | Ted Williams (BOS) | .406 |
| OPS | Ted Williams (BOS) | 1.287 |
| HR | Ted Williams (BOS) | 37 |
| RBI | Joe DiMaggio (NYY) | 125 |
| R | Ted Williams (BOS) | 135 |
| H | Cecil Travis (WSH) | 218 |
| SB | George Case (WSH) | 33 |

Pitching leaders
| Stat | Player | Total |
|---|---|---|
| W | Bob Feller (CLE) | 25 |
| L | Bobo Newsom (DET) | 20 |
| ERA | Thornton Lee (CWS) | 2.37 |
| K | Bob Feller (CLE) | 260 |
| IP | Bob Feller (CLE) | 343.0 |
| SV | Johnny Murphy (NYY) | 15 |
| WHIP | Thornton Lee (CWS) | 1.165 |

=== National League ===
Hitting leaders
| Stat | Player | Total |
|---|---|---|
| AVG | Pete Reiser (BRO) | .343 |
| OPS | Pete Reiser (BRO) | .964 |
| HR | Dolph Camilli (BRO) | 34 |
| RBI | Dolph Camilli (BRO) | 120 |
| R | Pete Reiser (BRO) | 117 |
| H | Stan Hack (CHC) | 186 |
| SB | Danny Murtaugh (PHI) | 18 |

Pitching leaders
| Stat | Player | Total |
|---|---|---|
| W | Kirby Higbe (BRO); Whit Wyatt (BRO) | 22 |
| L | Rip Sewell (PIT) | 17 |
| ERA | Elmer Riddle (CIN) | 2.24 |
| K | Johnny Vander Meer (CIN) | 202 |
| IP | Bucky Walters (CIN) | 305.0 |
| SV | Jumbo Brown (NYG) | 8 |
| WHIP | Whit Wyatt (BRO) | 1.058 |

== Milestones ==
=== Batters ===
==== Cycles ====
- George McQuinn (SLB):
  - McQuinn hit for his first cycle and fifth in franchise history, in game one of a doubleheader on July 19 against the Boston Red Sox.

==== Other batting accomplishments ====
- Wes Ferrell (BSN):
  - Set a Major League record for most career home runs by a pitcher by hitting his 37th home run as a pitcher (he hit one additional home run as a pinch hitter) on April 17 against the Philadelphia Phillies.
- Mel Ott (NYG):
  - Became the fourth player in Major League history to hit 400 home runs in the third inning against the Cincinnati Reds in game one of a doubleheader on June 1, reaching his 1,500th career RBI.
- Joe DiMaggio (NYY):
  - Set a Major League record with a 56-game hitting streak, hitting in every game from May 15 to July 16. The record has been described as unbreakable.
- Ted Williams (BOS):
  - Became the last qualified player in Major League history to finish a season with a batting average of at least .400, ending the season with a .406 average.

=== Pitchers ===
==== No-hitters ====
- Lon Warneke (STL):
  - Warneke threw his first career no-hitter and fourth no-hitter in franchise history, by defeating the Cincinnati Reds 2–0 on August 30. Warneke walked one and struck out two.

==== Other pitching accomplishments ====
- Lefty Grove (BOS):
  - Became the 12th member of the 300-win club, defeating the Cleveland Indians on July 25, winning 10–6.

== Awards and honors ==
=== Regular season ===
Baseball Writers' Association of America Awards
| BBWAA Award | National League | American League |
|---|---|---|
| Most Valuable Player | Dolph Camilli (BRO) | Joe DiMaggio (NYY) |

=== Other awards ===
The Sporting News Awards
| Award | National League | American League |
|---|---|---|
| Most Valuable Player | Dolph Camilli (BRO) | Joe DiMaggio (NYY) |
| Player of the Year | — | Ted Williams (BOS) |
| Manager of the Year | Billy Southworth (STL) | — |
| Executive of the Year | — | Ed Barrow (NYY) |

== Home field attendance ==
| Team name | Wins | %± | Home attendance | %± | Per game |
|---|---|---|---|---|---|
| Brooklyn Dodgers | 100 | 13.6% | 1,214,910 | 24.5% | 15,379 |
| New York Yankees | 101 | 14.8% | 964,722 | −2.5% | 12,368 |
| New York Giants | 74 | 2.8% | 763,098 | 2.0% | 9,783 |
| Cleveland Indians | 75 | −15.7% | 745,948 | −17.4% | 9,688 |
| Boston Red Sox | 84 | 2.4% | 718,497 | 0.3% | 9,331 |
| Detroit Tigers | 75 | −16.7% | 684,915 | −38.4% | 8,895 |
| Chicago White Sox | 77 | −6.1% | 677,077 | 2.5% | 8,571 |
| Cincinnati Reds | 88 | −12.0% | 643,513 | −24.3% | 8,146 |
| St. Louis Cardinals | 97 | 15.5% | 633,645 | 95.5% | 8,021 |
| Chicago Cubs | 70 | −6.7% | 545,159 | 1.9% | 7,080 |
| Philadelphia Athletics | 64 | 18.5% | 528,894 | 22.4% | 6,869 |
| Pittsburgh Pirates | 81 | 3.8% | 482,241 | −5.1% | 6,183 |
| Washington Senators | 70 | 9.4% | 415,663 | 9.0% | 5,329 |
| Boston Braves | 62 | −4.6% | 263,680 | 9.1% | 3,469 |
| Philadelphia Phillies | 43 | −14.0% | 231,401 | 11.7% | 3,045 |
| St. Louis Browns | 70 | 4.5% | 176,240 | −26.4% | 2,231 |

== Venues ==
Over 77 home games, the Cleveland Indians played 45 games at League Park and 32 games at Cleveland Stadium. All Wednesday home games took place at League Park. This would be the 7th of 12 seasons since 1932 that saw the Indians play at both venues, and was the last season which saw the majority of home games at League Park.

== See also ==
- 1941 in baseball (Events, Births, Deaths)
