= 1944 Chicago White Sox season =

1944 Chicago White Sox
- League: American League
- Ballpark: Comiskey Park
- City: Chicago, Illinois
- Owners: Grace Comiskey
- General managers: Harry Grabiner
- Managers: Jimmy Dykes
- Radio: WIND (AM) (Walt Lochman)

The 1944 Chicago White Sox season was the White Sox's 44th season in the major leagues, and their 45th season overall. They finished with a record of 71–83, good enough for seventh place in the American League, 18 games behind the first place St. Louis Browns.

== Regular season ==
=== Season standings ===
American League
Team	W	L	Pct.	GB	Home	Road
St. Louis Browns	89	65	.578	—	54‍–‍23	35‍–‍42
Detroit Tigers	88	66	.571	1	43‍–‍34	45‍–‍32
New York Yankees	83	71	.539	6	47‍–‍31	36‍–‍40
Boston Red Sox	77	77	.500	12	47‍–‍30	30‍–‍47
Cleveland Indians	72	82	.468	17	39‍–‍38	33‍–‍44
Philadelphia Athletics	72	82	.468	17	39‍–‍37	33‍–‍45
Chicago White Sox	71	83	.461	18	41‍–‍36	30‍–‍47
Washington Senators	64	90	.416	25	40‍–‍37	24‍–‍53

=== Record vs. opponents ===
1944 American League record Sources:
Team	BOS	CWS	CLE	DET	NYY	PHA	SLB	WSH
Boston	—	17–5	8–14	10–12–2	11–11	11–11	10–12	10–12
Chicago	5–17	—	14–8	9–13	10–12	9–13	8–14	16–6
Cleveland	14–8	8–14	—	10–12	8–14	12–10–1	10–12	10–12
Detroit	12–10–2	13–9	12–10	—	14–8	11–11	9–13	17–5
New York	11–11	12–10	14–8	8–14	—	13–9	10–12	15–7
Philadelphia	11–11	13–9	10–12–1	11–11	9–13	—	9–13	9–13
St. Louis	12–10	14–8	12–10	13–9	12–10	13–9	—	13–9
Washington	12–10	6–16	12–10	5–17	7–15	13–9	9–13	—

=== 1944 Opening Day lineup ===
- Skeeter Webb, SS
- Myril Hoag, CF
- Johnny Dickshot, LF
- Hal Trosky, 1B
- Guy Curtright, RF
- Grey Clarke, 3B
- Roy Schalk, 2B
- Tom Turner, C
- Orval Grove, P

=== Roster ===
1944 Chicago White Sox
Roster
Pitchers: 18 Bill Dietrich; 45 Orval Grove; 34 Don Hanski; 35 Joe Haynes; 26 Johnny Humphries; 27 Thornton Lee; 48 Ed Lopat; 37 Gordon Maltzberger; 19 Buck Ross; 39 Floyd Speer; 46 Jake Wade	Catchers: 14 Vince Castino; 17 Tom Jordan; 15 Mike Tresh; 17 Tom Turner; Infielders: 4 Grey Clarke; 47 Tony Cuccinello; 25 Ralph Hodgin; 29 William Metzig; 28 Cass Michaels; 6 Roy Schalk; 7 Hal Trosky; 2 Skeeter Webb	Outfielders: 24 Eddie Carnett; 12 Guy Curtright; 36 Johnny Dickshot; 28 Myril Hoag; 9 Wally Moses; 8 Thurman Tucker	Manager: 5 Jimmy Dykes; Coaches: 22 Mule Haas; 33 Bing Miller; 38 Muddy Ruel

== Player stats ==
=== Batting ===
Note: G = Games played; AB = At bats; R = Runs scored; H = Hits; 2B = Doubles; 3B = Triples; HR = Home runs; RBI = Runs batted in; BB = Base on balls; SO = Strikeouts; AVG = Batting average; SB = Stolen bases

Player	G	AB	R	H	2B	3B	HR	RBI	BB	SO	AVG	SB
Eddie Carnett, LF, 1B, CF, RF	126	457	51	126	18	8	1	60	26	35	.276	5
Vince Castino, C	29	78	8	18	5	0	0	3	10	13	.231	0
Grey Clarke, 3B	63	169	14	44	10	1	0	27	22	6	.260	0
Tony Cuccinello, 3B, 2B	38	130	5	34	3	0	0	17	8	16	.262	0
Guy Curtright, LF, RF	72	198	22	50	8	2	2	23	23	21	.253	4
Johnny Dickshot, LF	62	162	18	41	8	5	0	15	13	10	.253	2
Myril Hoag, CF	17	48	5	11	1	0	0	4	10	1	.229	1
Ralph Hodgin, 3B, LF	121	465	56	137	25	7	1	51	21	14	.295	3
Tom Jordan, C	14	45	2	12	1	1	0	3	1	0	.267	0
William Metzig, 2B	5	16	1	2	0	0	0	1	1	4	.125	0
Cass Michaels, SS	27	68	4	12	4	1	0	5	2	5	.176	0
Wally Moses, RF	136	535	82	150	26	9	3	34	52	22	.280	21
Roy Schalk, 2B	146	587	47	129	14	4	1	44	45	52	.220	5
Mike Tresh, C	93	312	22	81	8	1	0	25	37	15	.260	0
Hal Trosky, 1B	135	497	55	120	32	2	10	70	62	30	.241	3
Thurman Tucker, CF	124	446	59	128	15	6	2	46	57	40	.287	13
Tom Turner, C	36	113	9	26	6	0	2	13	5	16	.230	0
Skeeter Webb, SS	139	513	44	108	19	6	0	30	20	39	.211	7

Player	G	AB	R	H	2B	3B	HR	RBI	BB	SO	AVG	SB
Bill Dietrich, P	36	77	8	9	0	0	1	4	5	33	.117	0
Orval Grove, P	34	77	4	8	1	1	0	4	5	25	.104	0
Don Hanski, P	2	1	0	0	0	0	0	0	0	0	.000	0
Joe Haynes, P	33	50	6	10	3	0	0	2	3	5	.200	2
Johnny Humphries, P	30	53	5	10	2	0	0	2	3	16	.189	0
Thornton Lee, P	15	42	2	4	0	0	0	2	0	8	.095	0
Eddie Lopat, P	30	81	8	25	1	1	0	6	5	5	.309	0
Gordon Maltzberger, P	46	22	2	3	0	0	0	3	2	10	.136	0
Buck Ross, P	20	26	1	2	0	0	0	0	0	4	.077	0
Jake Wade, P	19	24	3	7	0	0	0	0	1	3	.292	0
Team totals	154	5292	543	1307	210	55	23	494	439	448	.247	66

=== Pitching ===
Note: W = Wins; L = Losses; ERA = Earned run average; G = Games pitched; GS = Games started; SV = Saves; IP = Innings pitched; H = Hits allowed; R = Runs allowed; ER = Earned runs allowed; HR = Home runs allowed; BB = Walks allowed; K = Strikeouts

Player	W	L	ERA	G	GS	SV	IP	H	R	ER	HR	BB	K
Eddie Carnett	0	0	9.00	2	0	0	2.0	3	2	2	1	0	1
Bill Dietrich	16	17	3.62	36	36	0	246.0	269	132	99	15	68	70
Orval Grove	14	15	3.72	34	33	0	234.2	237	112	97	11	71	105
Don Hanski	0	0	12.00	2	0	0	3.0	5	4	4	0	2	0
Joe Haynes	5	6	2.57	33	12	2	154.1	148	55	44	5	43	44
Johnny Humphries	8	10	3.67	30	20	1	169.0	170	75	69	9	57	42
Thornton Lee	3	9	3.02	15	14	0	113.1	105	51	38	3	25	39
Eddie Lopat	11	10	3.26	27	25	0	210.0	217	96	76	12	59	75
Gordon Maltzberger	10	5	2.96	46	0	12	91.1	81	31	30	2	19	49
Buck Ross	2	7	5.18	20	9	0	90.1	97	56	52	7	35	20
Floyd Speer	0	0	9.00	2	0	0	2.0	4	2	2	0	0	1
Jake Wade	2	4	4.82	19	5	2	74.2	75	46	40	3	41	35
Team totals	71	83	3.58	154	154	17	1390.2	1411	662	553	68	420	481
