= 1944 Washington Senators season =

1944 Washington Senators
- League: American League
- Ballpark: Griffith Stadium
- City: Washington, D.C.
- Record: 49–90 (.353)
- League place: 8th
- Owners: Clark Griffith and George H. Richardson
- Managers: Ossie Bluege

The 1944 Washington Senators won 64 games, lost 90, and finished in eighth place in the American League. They were managed by Ossie Bluege and played home games at Griffith Stadium.

== Regular season ==
=== Season standings ===
American League
Team	W	L	Pct.	GB	Home	Road
St. Louis Browns	89	65	.578	—	54‍–‍23	35‍–‍42
Detroit Tigers	88	66	.571	1	43‍–‍34	45‍–‍32
New York Yankees	83	71	.539	6	47‍–‍31	36‍–‍40
Boston Red Sox	77	77	.500	12	47‍–‍30	30‍–‍47
Cleveland Indians	72	82	.468	17	39‍–‍38	33‍–‍44
Philadelphia Athletics	72	82	.468	17	39‍–‍37	33‍–‍45
Chicago White Sox	71	83	.461	18	41‍–‍36	30‍–‍47
Washington Senators	64	90	.416	25	40‍–‍37	24‍–‍53

=== Record vs. opponents ===
1944 American League record Sources:
Team	BOS	CWS	CLE	DET	NYY	PHA	SLB	WSH
Boston	—	17–5	8–14	10–12–2	11–11	11–11	10–12	10–12
Chicago	5–17	—	14–8	9–13	10–12	9–13	8–14	16–6
Cleveland	14–8	8–14	—	10–12	8–14	12–10–1	10–12	10–12
Detroit	12–10–2	13–9	12–10	—	14–8	11–11	9–13	17–5
New York	11–11	12–10	14–8	8–14	—	13–9	10–12	15–7
Philadelphia	11–11	13–9	10–12–1	11–11	9–13	—	9–13	9–13
St. Louis	12–10	14–8	12–10	13–9	12–10	13–9	—	13–9
Washington	12–10	6–16	12–10	5–17	7–15	13–9	9–13	—

=== Roster ===
1944 Washington Senators
Roster
Pitchers: 14 Milo Candini; 18 Alex Carrasquel; 27 Vern Curtis; 10 Mickey Haefner; 19 Wally Holborow; 20 Bill Lefebvre; 16 Dutch Leonard; 12 Johnny Niggeling; -- Baby Ortiz; 11 Jug Thesenga; 19 Sandy Ullrich; 15 Roger Wolff; 11 Early Wynn; 41 Bill Zinser	Catchers: 27 Al Evans; 8 Rick Ferrell; 9 Mike Guerra; Infielders: 26 Ed Butka; 3 Harlond Clift; 21 Preston Gómez; 5 Joe Kuhel; 22 Hillis Layne; 24 George Myatt; 6 Luis Suárez; 7 John Sullivan; 25 Gil Torres; 21 Fred Vaughn; 6 Eddie Yost	Outfielders: 6 George Binks; 3,17 Ed Boland; 1 George Case; 17 René Monteagudo; 1 Roberto Ortiz; 23 Jake Powell; 2 Stan Spence; 6 Joe Vosmik; Other batters: 27 Roy Valdés	Manager: 30 Ossie Bluege; Coaches: 33 Nick Altrock; 29 Joe Fitzgerald; 31 Clyde Milan; 32 George Uhle

== Player stats ==
=== Batting ===
==== Starters by position ====
Note: Pos = Position; G = Games played; AB = At bats; H = Hits; Avg. = Batting average; HR = Home runs; RBI = Runs batted in

Pos	Player	G	AB	H	Avg.	HR	RBI
C	Rick Ferrell	99	339	94	.277	0	25
1B	Joe Kuhel	139	518	144	.278	4	51
2B	George Myatt	140	538	153	.284	0	40
SS	John Sullivan	138	471	118	.251	0	30
3B	Gil Torres	134	524	140	.267	0	58
OF	Jake Powell	96	367	88	.240	1	37
OF	Stan Spence	153	592	187	.316	18	100
OF	George Case	119	464	116	.250	2	32

==== Other batters ====
Note: G = Games played; AB = At bats; H = Hits; Avg. = Batting average; HR = Home runs; RBI = Runs batted in

Player	G	AB	H	Avg.	HR	RBI
Roberto Ortiz	85	316	80	.253	5	35
Mike Guerra	75	210	59	.281	1	29
Fred Vaughn	30	109	28	.257	1	21
Hillis Layne	33	87	17	.195	0	8
Ed Boland	19	59	16	.271	0	14
Harlond Clift	12	44	7	.159	0	3
Ed Butka	15	41	8	.195	0	1
René Monteagudo	10	38	11	.289	0	4
Joe Vosmik	14	36	7	.194	0	9
Al Evans	14	22	2	.091	0	0
Eddie Yost	7	14	2	.143	0	0
George Binks	5	12	3	.250	0	0
Preston Gómez	8	7	2	.286	0	2
Luis Suárez	1	2	0	.000	0	0
Roy Valdés	1	1	0	.000	0	0

=== Pitching ===
==== Starting pitchers ====
Note: G = Games pitched; IP = Innings pitched; W = Wins; L = Losses; ERA = Earned run average; SO = Strikeouts

Player	G	IP	W	L	ERA	SO
Dutch Leonard	32	229.1	14	14	3.06	62
Mickey Haefner	31	228.0	12	15	3.04	86
Early Wynn	33	207.2	8	17	3.38	65
Johnny Niggeling	24	206.0	10	8	2.32	121
Baby Ortiz	2	13.0	0	2	6.23	4

==== Other pitchers ====
Note: G = Games pitched; IP = Innings pitched; W = Wins; L = Losses; ERA = Earned run average; SO = Strikeouts

Player	G	IP	W	L	ERA	SO
Roger Wolff	33	155.0	4	15	4.99	73
Alex Carrasquel	43	134.0	8	7	3.43	35
Milo Candini	28	103.0	6	7	4.11	31
Jug Thesenga	5	12.1	0	0	5.11	2
Vern Curtis	3	9.2	0	1	2.79	2

==== Relief pitchers ====
Note: G = Games pitched; W = Wins; L = Losses; SV = Saves; ERA = Earned run average; SO = Strikeouts

Player	G	W	L	SV	ERA	SO
Bill Lefebvre	24	2	4	3	4.52	18
Sandy Ullrich	3	0	0	0	9.31	2
Bill Zinser	2	0	0	0	27.00	1
Wally Holborow	1	0	0	0	0.00	0

== Farm system ==
Level	Team	League	Manager
A1	Chattanooga Lookouts	Southern Association	Scrappy Moore
A	Williamsport Grays	Eastern League	Ray Kolp
