= 1943 Chicago White Sox season =

1943 Chicago White Sox
- League: American League
- Ballpark: Comiskey Park
- City: Chicago, Illinois
- Owners: Grace Comiskey
- General managers: Harry Grabiner
- Managers: Jimmy Dykes
- Radio: WGN (AM) (Jack Brickhouse, Dick Enroth); WCFL (Hal Totten); WJJD/WIND (AM) (Bert Wilson, Pat Flanagan)

The 1943 Chicago White Sox season was the White Sox's 43rd season in the major leagues, and their 44th season overall. They finished with a record of 82–72, good enough for fourth place in the American League, 16 games behind the first place New York Yankees. The White Sox played a record 44 doubleheaders over the course of the season.

== Regular season ==
=== Season standings ===
American League
Team	W	L	Pct.	GB	Home	Road
New York Yankees	98	56	.636	—	54‍–‍23	44‍–‍33
Washington Senators	84	69	.549	13½	44‍–‍32	40‍–‍37
Cleveland Indians	82	71	.536	15½	44‍–‍33	38‍–‍38
Chicago White Sox	82	72	.532	16	40‍–‍36	42‍–‍36
Detroit Tigers	78	76	.506	20	45‍–‍32	33‍–‍44
St. Louis Browns	72	80	.474	25	44‍–‍33	28‍–‍47
Boston Red Sox	68	84	.447	29	39‍–‍36	29‍–‍48
Philadelphia Athletics	49	105	.318	49	27‍–‍51	22‍–‍54

=== Record vs. opponents ===
1943 American League record Sources:
Team	BOS	CWS	CLE	DET	NYY	PHA	SLB	WSH
Boston	—	8–14	12–10	11–11–1	5–17–1	11–11	11–9–1	10–12
Chicago	14–8	—	7–15	9–13	10–12	18–4–1	10–12	14–8
Cleveland	10–12	15–7	—	15–7	9–13	16–6	9–13	8–13
Detroit	11–11–1	13–9	7–15	—	10–12	13–9	11–11	13–9
New York	17–5–1	12–10	13–9	12–10	—	16–6	17–5	11–11
Philadelphia	11–11	4–18–1	6–16	9–13	6–16	—	8–14	5–17
St. Louis	9–11–1	12–10	13–9	11–11	5–17	14–8	—	8–14
Washington	12–10	8–14	13–8	9–13	11–11	17–5	14–8	—

=== Opening Day lineup ===
- Thurman Tucker, CF
- Luke Appling, SS
- Joe Kuhel, 1B
- Moose Solters, LF
- Don Kolloway, 2B
- Wally Moses, RF
- Jimmy Grant, 3B
- Mike Tresh, C
- Bill Dietrich, P

=== Roster ===
1943 Chicago White Sox
Roster
Pitchers: 18 Bill Dietrich; 45 Orval Grove; 35 Joe Haynes; 26 Johnny Humphries; 27 Thornton Lee; 37 Gordon Maltzberger; 19 Buck Ross; 46 Eddie Smith; 29 Floyd Speer; 48 Bill Swift; 24 Jake Wade	Catchers: 14 Vince Castino; 15 Mike Tresh; 17 Tom Turner; Infielders: 4 Luke Appling; 47 Tony Cuccinello; 28 Dick Culler; 7 Jimmy Grant; 34 Don Hanski; 25 Ralph Hodgin; 47 Don Kolloway; 3 Joe Kuhel; 29 Cass Michaels; 2 Skeeter Webb	Outfielders: 12 Guy Curtright; 9 Wally Moses; 6 Moose Solters; 8 Thurman Tucker; Other batters: 36 Frank Kalin	Manager: 5 Jimmy Dykes; Coaches: 22 Mule Haas; 33 Bing Miller; 38 Muddy Ruel

== Player stats ==
= Indicates team leader

= Indicates league leader

=== Batting ===
Note: G = Games played; AB = At bats; R = Runs scored; H = Hits; 2B = Doubles; 3B = Triples; HR = Home runs; RBI = Runs batted in; BB = Base on balls; SO = Strikeouts; AVG = Batting average; SB = Stolen bases

Player	G	AB	R	H	2B	3B	HR	RBI	BB	SO	AVG	SB
Luke Appling, SS	155	585	63	192	33	2	3	80	90	29	.328	27
Vince Castino, C	33	101	14	23	1	0	2	16	12	11	.228	0
Tony Cuccinello, 3B	34	103	5	28	5	0	2	11	13	13	.272	3
Dick Culler, 3B, 2B	53	148	9	32	5	1	0	11	16	11	.216	4
Guy Curtright, LF	138	488	67	142	20	7	3	48	69	60	.291	13
Jimmy Grant, 3B	58	197	23	51	9	2	4	22	18	34	.259	4
Don Hanski, 1B	9	21	1	5	1	0	0	2	0	5	.238	0
Ralph Hodgin, 3B, RF, LF	117	407	52	128	22	8	1	50	20	24	.314	3
Frank Kalin, PH	4	4	0	0	0	0	0	0	0	0	.000	0
Don Kolloway, 2B	85	348	29	75	14	4	1	33	9	30	.216	11
Joe Kuhel, 1B	153	531	55	113	21	1	5	46	76	45	.213	14
Cass Michaels, 3B	2	7	0	0	0	0	0	0	0	0	.000	0
Wally Moses, RF, CF	150	599	82	147	22	12	3	48	55	47	.245	56
Moose Solters, LF, RF	42	97	6	15	0	0	1	8	7	5	.155	0
Mike Tresh, C	86	279	20	60	3	0	0	20	37	20	.215	2
Thurman Tucker, CF	139	528	81	124	15	6	3	39	79	72	.235	29
Tom Turner, C	51	154	16	37	7	1	2	11	13	21	.240	1
Skeeter Webb, 2B	58	213	15	50	5	2	0	22	6	19	.235	5

Player	G	AB	R	H	2B	3B	HR	RBI	BB	SO	AVG	SB
Bill Dietrich, P	26	56	7	8	1	0	1	6	5	22	.143	0
Orval Grove, P	32	66	9	12	0	0	0	7	11	22	.182	0
Joe Haynes, P	35	34	5	9	0	0	0	4	3	9	.265	0
Johnny Humphries, P	28	69	6	20	6	0	0	5	3	25	.290	1
Thornton Lee, P	19	42	1	3	0	0	0	3	0	8	.071	0
Gordon Maltzberger, P	37	25	0	3	0	0	0	1	6	14	.120	0
Buck Ross, P	21	46	1	4	1	0	1	4	5	15	.087	0
Eddie Smith, P	25	69	4	11	1	0	1	8	2	9	.159	0
Bill Swift, P	18	10	0	1	0	0	0	0	3	3	.100	0
Jake Wade, P	21	27	2	4	1	0	0	3	3	9	.148	0
Team totals	155	5254	573	1297	193	46	33	508	561	582	.247	173

=== Pitching ===
Note: W = Wins; L = Losses; ERA = Earned run average; G = Games pitched; GS = Games started; SV = Saves; IP = Innings pitched; H = Hits allowed; R = Runs allowed; ER = Earned runs allowed; HR = Home runs allowed; BB = Walks allowed; K = Strikeouts

Player	W	L	ERA	G	GS	SV	IP	H	R	ER	HR	BB	K
Bill Dietrich	12	10	2.80	26	26	0	186.2	180	72	58	4	53	52
Orval Grove	15	9	2.75	32	25	2	216.1	192	84	66	9	72	76
Don Hanski	0	0	0.00	1	0	0	1.0	1	0	0	0	1	0
Joe Haynes	7	2	2.96	35	2	3	109.1	114	51	36	2	32	37
Johnny Humphries	11	11	3.30	28	27	0	188.1	198	86	69	7	54	51
Thornton Lee	5	9	4.18	19	19	0	127.0	129	66	59	8	50	35
Gordon Maltzberger	7	4	2.46	37	0	14	98.2	86	29	27	8	24	48
Buck Ross	11	7	3.19	21	21	0	149.1	140	61	53	6	56	41
Eddie Smith	11	11	3.69	25	25	0	187.2	197	85	77	4	76	66
Floyd Speer	0	0	9.00	1	0	0	1.0	1	1	1	0	2	1
Bill Swift	0	2	4.21	18	1	0	51.1	48	25	24	3	27	28
Jake Wade	3	7	3.01	21	9	0	83.2	66	34	28	3	54	41
Team totals	82	72	3.20	155	155	19	1400.1	1352	594	498	54	501	476
