= George Sisler =

American baseball player and coach (1893–1973)

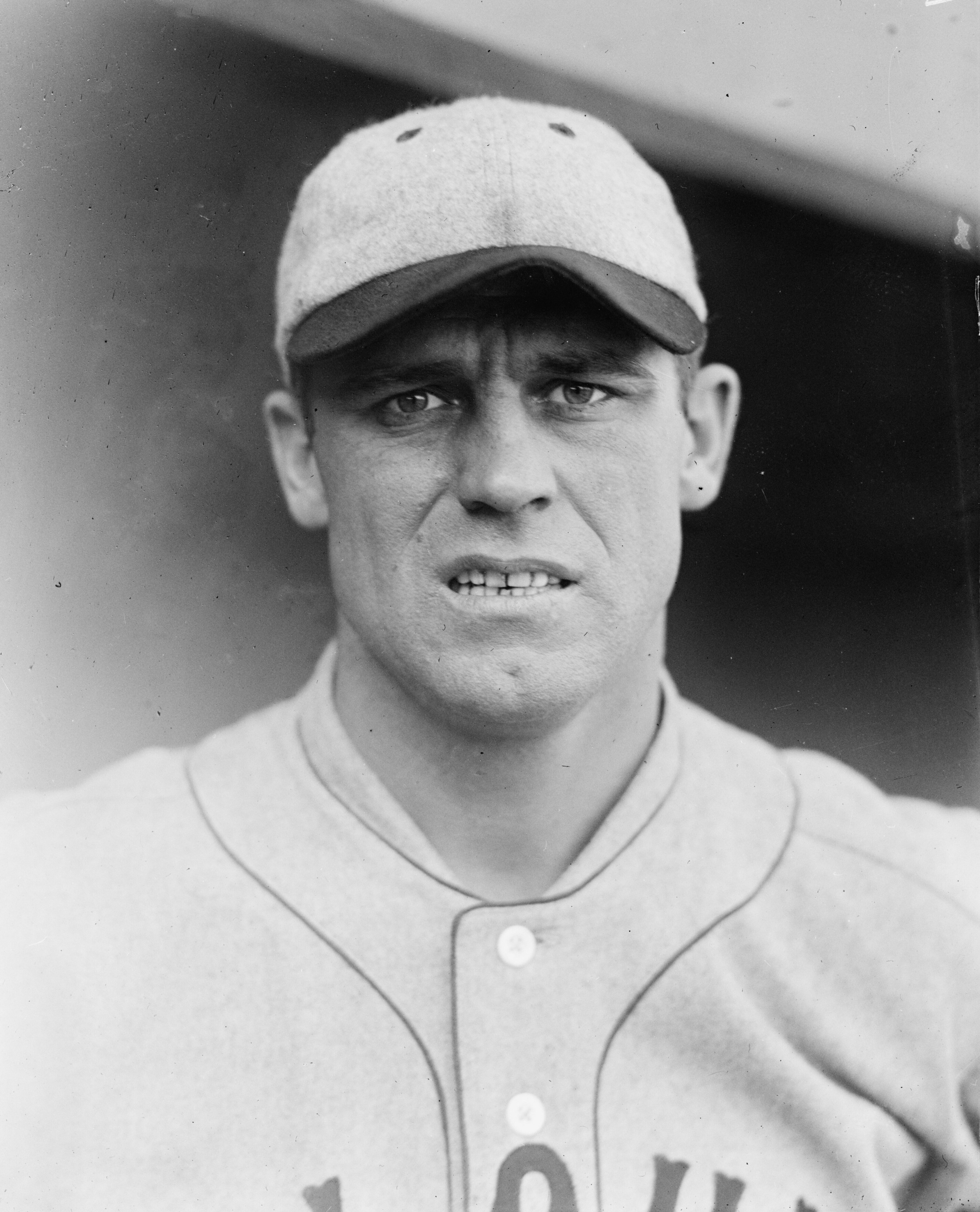
- Sisler in 1924
- First baseman / Manager
- Born: March 24, 1893; Manchester, Ohio, U.S.
- Died: March 26, 1973 (aged 80); Richmond Heights, Missouri, U.S.
- Batted: Left Threw: Left

MLB debut
- June 28, 1915, for the St. Louis Browns

Last MLB appearance
- September 22, 1930, for the Boston Braves

MLB statistics
- Batting average: .340
- Hits: 2,812
- Home runs: 102
- Runs batted in: 1,178
- Managerial record: 218–241
- Winning %: .475
- Stats at Baseball Reference

Teams
- As player: St. Louis Browns (1915–1922, 1924–1927); Washington Senators (1928); Boston Braves (1928–1930); As manager: St. Louis Browns (1924–1926)

Career highlights and awards
- AL MVP (1922); 2× AL batting champion (1920, 1922); 4× AL stolen base leader (1918, 1921, 1922, 1927)

Member of the National

Baseball Hall of Fame
- Induction: 1939
- Vote: 85.8% (fourth ballot)

George Harold Sisler (March 24, 1893 – March 26, 1973), nicknamed "Gorgeous George", was an American professional baseball first baseman and player-manager. From 1915 through 1930, he played in Major League Baseball (MLB) for the St. Louis Browns, Washington Senators, and Boston Braves. He managed the Browns from 1924 through 1926.

Sisler played college baseball for the University of Michigan and was signed by the St. Louis Browns in 1915. He won the American League (AL) batting title in 1920 and 1922. In 1920, he batted .407 and recorded 257 hits, the record until Ichiro Suzuki had 262 in 2004. Sisler won the AL Most Valuable Player Award in 1922, finishing with a batting average of .420, the third-highest batting average by AL or NL players after 1900. An attack of sinusitis caused vision troubles that jeopardized Sisler's career, but he returned to playing in 1924, remaining in the major leagues through the 1930 season. After Sisler retired as a player, he worked as a major league scout and aide.

A career .340 hitter, Sisler had a batting average of over .300 a total of 13 times. He led the league in hits twice, triples twice, and stolen bases four times. He collected 200 or more hits six times.

In 1939, Sisler received 85.8% of the Baseball Writers' Association of America votes and was elected to the National Baseball Hall of Fame in his fourth year of eligibility.

== Early life ==
Sisler was born on March 24, 1893, in the unincorporated hamlet of Manchester (now part of the city of New Franklin, a suburb of Akron), Ohio. His parents, Cassius Clay and Mary (née Whipple) Sisler, were married after meeting at Hiram College, which they both graduated from. Both worked as schoolteachers at one point, though by the time George was born, Cassius was supervising a nearby coal mine. Manchester did not have a high school; thus, when George turned 14, he moved to Akron to live with his older brother Efbert so that he could attend school there. Sisler played baseball, basketball, and football in high school, but baseball was his main focus. Because of his good looks, the local newspapers began referring to him as "Gorgeous George". During George's senior year, Efbert died of tuberculosis, but George was able to move in with a local family and finish school.

== College career ==
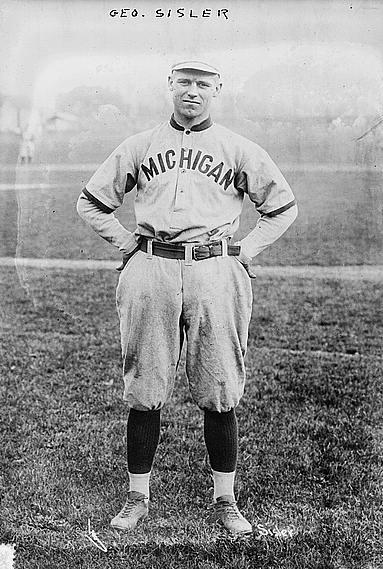
Sisler with the Michigan Wolverines

In 1910, Sisler signed a professional contract with the Akron Champs of the Ohio–Pennsylvania League, but he never played in the league or earned any money. Instead, he followed his parents' wishes and attended the University of Michigan, where he majored in mechanical engineering and played college baseball. Freshmen were not allowed to play on Michigan's varsity teams, so Sisler pitched for an intra-campus team representing the school's engineering students in 1912, striking out 20 batters in seven innings during one game. After the season, he pitched for an industrial team in Akron. Barney Dreyfuss, owner of the Pittsburgh Pirates, was impressed when he observed Sisler in a game. He purchased Sisler's contract and tried to force the player to join his ballclub in 1912. Refusing to report, Sisler was placed on the Pirates' suspended list, which threatened his professional eligibility.

Recognizing he was in trouble, Sisler consulted Branch Rickey, Michigan's baseball coach. A former lawyer, Rickey determined that the contract should not bind Sisler, since the ballplayer signed it as a minor without the consent of his parents. Rickey and Detroit judge George P. Codd contacted the National Commission, baseball's governing body, asking for the contract to be declared illegal. The commission failed to come to a decision in 1912 because one of its members, August Herrmann, thought Sisler should give the Pirates the first right to sign him, while Codd wanted the contract declared completely void. After Sisler's junior year, with the time when he would play professional ball nearing, Codd pressed Herrmann for a decision, threatening to sue for triple damages. Herrmann obtained a legal opinion that agreed with Sisler's position, and the Commission finally ruled the contract void in 1914.

Meanwhile, Sisler joined Michigan's varsity team as a sophomore in 1913. He excelled on the mound for the Wolverines until a sore arm limited him late in the season. Offensively, he led the team with a .445 batting average, playing the outfield on days he was not pitching so his bat could remain in the lineup. Sporting Life proclaimed him "the greatest college pitcher", and Vanity Fair named him an All-American for the first of three consecutive years.

Over the summer of 1913, Sisler consulted Youngstown physician John D. "Bonesetter" Reese about his sore arm. The Wolverines were then coached by Carl Lundgren, hired as Rickey's successor after the former coach took a job with the St. Louis Browns. Sisler felt back in form by the time the season started, and his teammates voted him captain of the Wolverines. He helped Michigan hold opponents scoreless for 44 straight innings, personally striking out 10 batters in a row before reinjuring his arm in a game against Syracuse. At the end of the season, he had two hits, three runs scored, and two stolen bases in the first of two victories over the Penn Quakers that gave the Wolverines the 1914 college baseball national championship.

Sisler did not remain the captain in 1915, as Edmon McQueen was selected. Lundgren planned to use Sisler less as a pitcher early on in hopes that his arm would not be sore by the end of the year. The plan worked. Though pitching statistics for the year were not kept, Sisler had one game where he limited the Cornell Big Red to one hit, and in another game he struck out 14 Notre Dame batters. He recorded five stolen bases in his final game for Michigan, stealing home once. Sisler batted .451 and committed no errors. He graduated in the summer of 1915 with his degree in mechanical engineering.

== Professional career ==
=== St. Louis Browns ===
==== Early years (1915–1919) ====
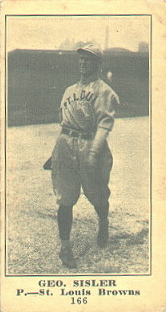
1916 baseball card of Sisler listing him as a pitcher

Both Pittsburgh and the Browns were interested in signing Sisler to play professional baseball for them following his graduation. The Pirates offered $700 a month with a $1,000 bonus, but the Browns offered a $5,000 bonus with a $200-per-month salary. Sisler chose St. Louis because he was comfortable playing for Rickey, now the Browns' manager.

On June 28, 1915, Sisler made his major league debut, entering as a pitcher in relief against the Chicago White Sox. He pitched three scoreless innings and struck out two batters, while at the plate he collected his first major league hit, which came against Jim Scott. Five days later, he pitched a complete game victory in his first major league start, in which he struck out nine batters but also walked nine.

Rickey, however, thought Sisler was too good at baseball to confine himself to pitching every few days. First baseman John Leary was struggling at the position, and Rickey decided to try Sisler there. Initially, the stress of learning a new position sent Sisler into a batting slump, but after Rickey let him pitch another game, his confidence began to grow. Sisler still pitched and played the outfield as well in 1915; on August 29, he defeated Walter Johnson in a complete game, 2–1 victory. Offensively, he batted .285 with three home runs, while as a pitcher, he had a 4–4 record, posting a 2.83 earned run average (ERA), slightly better than the American League (AL) average of 2.93.

In 1916, Sisler became the Browns' full-time first baseman, playing the position for 141 of the team's 158 games. His .305 batting average led the team, as did his hits (177) and slugging percentage (.400). Though Sisler's 24 errors that year led AL first basemen, Huhn wrote that he demonstrated "significant improvement and frequent brilliance" at the position. He made only three appearances on the mound that year, but in his most notable, on September 17, he threw a shutout, defeating Johnson and the Senators 1–0.

On August 11, 1917, in the second game of a doubleheader against the Philadelphia Athletics, Sisler recorded three hits in four at bats. The performance began a 26-game hitting streak, during which Sisler batted .422. For the season, he led the team in most offensive categories, and his .353 batting average was second in the AL, behind Ty Cobb's .383.

Following the American entry into World War I, the draft was enacted in the 1917–18 offseason. Browns Urban Shocker and Ken Williams were both drafted during the 1918 season, but Sisler's Class 4 status kept him playing baseball for the whole year. Due to the war, the season ended on September 1, making it a month shorter than usual. Playing 114 games, Sisler led the AL with 45 stolen bases and placed third in the AL with a .341 batting average. A government-issued "work or fight" order required baseball players to assume essential wartime employment or become more eligible for the draft after the season. Sisler enlisted in the army, joining several major league players as a second lieutenant in a Chemical Warfare Service unit commanded by Rickey. Undergoing training at Camp Humphreys in Virginia, Sisler was preparing to go overseas until the war ended that November, relieving him from his military obligation.

Returning to the Browns in 1919, Sisler struggled offensively at the beginning of the year, batting .207 through May 11. His hitting improved thereafter, and Sisler led the AL in batting average and stolen bases by mid-August, while the Browns, at 47–40, were still in the race for the AL pennant. On August 22, the normally quiet-natured Sisler nearly exchanged blows with Carl Mays. Thinking that the Yankee pitcher was throwing at him and suspecting Mays of using an illegal substance, Sisler convinced umpire George Moriarty to search Mays, which Moriarty took 10 minutes to do. Nothing was found, and Mays and Sisler yelled at each other, squaring off to fight before Moriarty stepped between them and separated them. The Browns struggled late in the season, finishing fifth in the AL with a 62–72–1 record, but Sisler finished the year leading the team in all offensive categories except games played. His .352 average ranked third in the AL, and his 10 home runs were topped in the league only by Babe Ruth's 29. Defensively, he had a .991 fielding percentage and led AL first basemen with 120 assists.

==== .400 hitter and MVP (1920–1922) ====
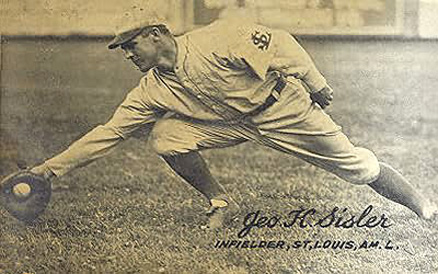
1921 baseball card of Sisler

In 1920, baseballs began to be manufactured with a tighter-wound yarn, and a greater emphasis was placed on keeping the balls clean, which made them easier for the hitters to spot. These changes ushered in the live-ball era, in which many batters began to hit more home runs. Prizing sharp contact over power, Sisler did not try for home runs, and his numbers rose in other offensive categories.

That season, Sisler played every inning of each game. He collected an MLB-record 257 hits, batting .407 and ending the season with averages of .442 in August and .448 in September. The total broke Cobb's 1911 record of 247 hits in a single season. After tying the old record on September 27, Sisler set the new one on September 28, a day dubbed "Sisler Day" during which he received a $1,000 check, a $1,500 silver service, and flowers from 1,500 fans before the game at Sportsman's Park. His record lasted until 2004, when Ichiro Suzuki had 262 hits. (Note: Suzuki, however, collected his hits over 161 games during the modern 162-game season as opposed to 154 in Sisler's era. Suzuki had 704 at bats to Sisler's 631.) Sisler also finished second in the AL in eight offensive categories, including home runs (19, behind Ruth's 54), RBI (122, tied with teammate Baby Doll Jacobson behind Ruth's 135), and stolen bases (42, behind Sam Rice's 63). Despite finishing second to Ruth in home runs, Sisler placed a greater focus on making contact with the ball.

The Browns fired manager Jimmy Burke over the 1920–21 offseason, offering the position to Sisler. He declined, fearing that the added responsibilities would interfere with his hitting. Sisler received the only suspension of his career on July 24. After umpire George Hildebrand ruled him out in a close play at first base to end the fourth inning, Sisler shoved the umpire. Told by Hildebrand not to take his position in the fifth inning, Sisler then punched the umpire. Though the suspension was listed as indefinite, rainouts helped Sisler miss only three games before getting reinstated. Against the Detroit Tigers from August 13 through 15, Sisler recorded 10 consecutive hits, one short of Tris Speaker's 1920 AL record. Though not quite as successful offensively in 1921 as he had been the year before, Sisler led the AL with 18 triples (tied with Howie Shanks and teammate Jack Tobin) and 35 stolen bases, also finishing fourth in the league with a .371 batting average. Defensively, he had a .993 fielding percentage over 138 games.

Sisler battled Cobb for the batting title in 1922. Cobb moved into the lead in late July, but Sisler tied him on August 7, at which point both players were batting .409. The Browns were in a tight pennant race with the New York Yankees, whom they trailed by 1 1/2 games as late as September 10. Against the Tigers on September 11, Sisler fell on his arm while stretching to his right to catch a wide throw from Wally Gerber. He suffered a strained deltoid muscle. Newspapers suggested that he would miss the remainder of the season, but Sisler underwent electric treatments and returned five days later for a series against the Yankees. At the time, he had a 39-game hitting streak going, one shy of Cobb's 1911 AL record and five shy of Willie Keeler's 1897 MLB record. He had hits in his first two games returning from the injury before going hitless on September 18. Sisler's 41-game hitting streak remained an AL record until surpassed by Joe DiMaggio's MLB record 56-game streak in 1941.

Sisler later recounted the struggles of rushing his return. "The arm was so badly crippled that I had to lift my gloved hand with my left hand in order to catch balls at first base. At bat, I was swinging with one hand." He batted .316 after returning from the injury. He had three hits, two runs scored, and two stolen bases on September 24 in a 7–4 victory over the Philadelphia Athletics. (Note: Huhn says he scored three runs that day, but Retrosheet and Baseball-Reference both credit him for just two.) The Browns remained in the race until September 30, the second-to-last day of the season, when a Yankee win over the Red Sox clinched the pennant for New York. Sisler's .420 batting average remains the third-highest of AL and National League (NL) players in the 20th century, surpassed only by Nap Lajoie's .426 in 1901 and Rogers Hornsby's .424 in 1924. Sisler also led the AL in hits (246), runs (134), stolen bases (51), and triples (18). He was chosen as the AL's Most Valuable Player in the first year that an official league award was given. In 2011, Kostya Kennedy of Sports Illustrated wrote that many baseball historians consider Sisler's season among the best individual all-around single-season performances in baseball history. Jim Barrero of the Los Angeles Times asserted in 2000 that Sisler's 257-hits record was largely overshadowed by Ruth's 54 home runs that same year. "Of course, Ruth's obliteration of the home run record drew all the attention from fans and newspapermen, while Sisler's mark was pushed to the side and perhaps left unappreciated during what was a golden age of pure hitters", Barrero wrote.

==== Vision troubles (1923) ====
A severe attack of sinusitis caused Sisler double vision in 1923. He had surgery to treat the condition on April 13 and received treatment from an eye specialist afterwards. By May, it was clear that the vision trouble was long-term, jeopardizing Sisler's chances of ever playing again. As a result, the Browns acquired Dutch Schliebner to play first base for them that season. Sisler began attending games again in April, regularly sitting in the upper deck at Sportsman's Park. During the year, he and many of his Browns teammates signed a petition to AL president Ban Johnson seeking to get Dave Danforth reinstated, after Johnson suspended Danforth 10 games for allegedly tampering with baseballs. Manager Lee Fohl refused to sign it and was fired days later. Sisler's eye treatments concluded by the end of the year, and the Browns hoped he would be able to play again in 1924. Sisler ensured he would remain with them by accepting the managerial position after the 1923 season, his worries about its effect on his hitting now counterbalanced by the uncertainty surrounding his playing career. Most people were in favor of the move, and sportswriter Joe Vila wrote, "Sisler, in the opinion of the sharps, is a born leader."

==== Player-manager (1924–1926) ====
Returning to play with the Browns at the beginning of 1924 spring training, Sisler batted .324 in the exhibition contests and was St. Louis's starting first baseman on Opening Day. Sisler later recalled, "I planned to get back in uniform for 1924. I just had to meet a ball with a good swing again, and then run. The doctors all said I'd never play again, but when you're fighting for something that actually keeps you alive – well, the human will is all you need." Observers noticed that he had to squint to see the ball, and Sisler said in an interview that he was now more concerned with making contact with the ball, instead of hitting it between fielders. He batted .305 in 1924, nearly 100 points below his combined batting average for 1920–22. He also led AL first basemen with 23 errors. Though not as good as he had been before the vision trouble, Sisler had "proven he could still play the game" according to Huhn.

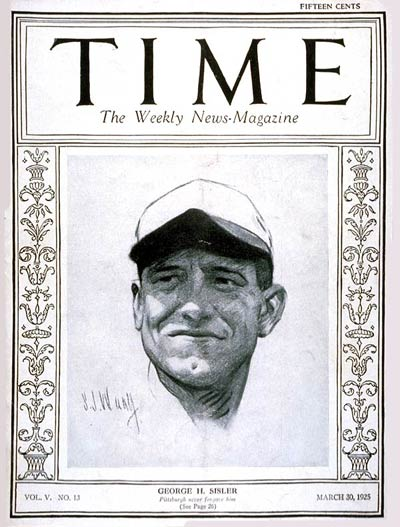
Time cover, March 30, 1925

As the ballclub's manager, Sisler asked his players for advice. "He's one of the fellows, but he's the leader", said Ken Williams. He did not have a set bedtime or wake-up time for the ballclub, unlike several other MLB managers. Despite his "player's manager" reputation, Sisler would still discipline his squad when necessary, as he proved in May when he fined Shocker for skipping and showing up late to several Browns games with no explanation. After a fifth-place finish in the eight-team AL in 1923, the Browns posted an identical 74–78 record in 1924, this time good for fourth in the league.

Sisler started the 1925 season by setting an MLB record with hits in his first 34 games of the year. Later in the season, he would have a 22-game hitting streak. Ruth said on May 10 that the Browns player was "staging the greatest come-back ever known to baseball ... the league ought to strike a medal for iron nerve and give it to George. He has whipped the worst odds any ball player ever played against." Sisler had his fourth and final 100-RBI season, with 105 runs driven in, and he batted .345. Though these statistics were more impressive than ones that many Hall of Fame hitters would approach in their careers, Sisler later said, "Oh, I know I hit .345 and got 228 hits [really 224] in 1925 but that never gave me much satisfaction. That isn't what I call real good hitting." With a record under .500 on July 30, the Browns were never in close contention for the AL pennant, but they finished the year with an 82–71 record, good for third place in the league.

In 1926, the injury-plagued Browns lost their first five games along with 16 out of 19 in a May road trip. There were reports as early as May that Sisler's managerial job was in jeopardy, and on June 1, St. Louis sportswriter J. Roy Stockton blamed the team's struggles on Sisler's easygoing attitude, saying that the Browns "have taken advantage of his kindness". With the team struggling, Sisler saw his RBI production diminish. He struggled in August, batting .038 in his first seven games and going hitless in 17 consecutive at bats during that time. In 150 games, he had seven home runs and 71 RBIs. His .290 batting average was his lowest since he batted .285 as a rookie in 1915. The Browns struggled to a 62–92 seventh-place finish in 1926, and their .403 winning percentage was the franchise's lowest since its 1916 season. Sisler was relieved of his managerial duties after the season, though he was retained as the Browns' first baseman.

==== Last season with Browns (1927) ====
Sisler batted .400 early in the 1927 season. On May 3, he had three hits and stole home in a 13–3 victory over the Cleveland Indians. In August, St. Louis sportswriter John E. Wray wrote that "were it not for the surprising flash of Lou Gehrig, Sisler [batting .340] would have the first base championship of the American League wrapped up and tucked away." Defensively, he led AL first basemen in errors once again, with 24. However, he batted .327 with 201 hits, five home runs, and 97 RBIs, leading the AL in stolen bases for a fourth time with 27.

The Browns endured another losing season in 1927, and as early as July 26, owner Phil Ball announced that with the team losing money, it would be trading many of its star players. On December 14, Sisler was traded to the Senators for cash, reported as $15,000 in Washington and $25,000 in St. Louis.

=== Washington Senators ===
Washington's first base job was not automatically Sisler's, as the Senators also had Joe Judge, a popular player who had hit over .300 the previous year. Though he outhit Judge .363 to .205 in spring training, Sisler's mobility was diminished, and Judge won the starting job. He made only two starts through Washington's first 28 games before starting seven games in a row at first base or in left field from May 19 through 25, though this was to get other teams interested in acquiring him. On May 27, the Senators sold his contract to the Boston Braves for $7,500. In 20 games, Sisler had batted .245 with a mere two RBI and no stolen bases.

=== Boston Braves ===
Hornsby, who had starred for the NL's Cardinals in Sportsman's Park for many years, now managed the Braves, and after spearheading the Sisler acquisition, he installed the veteran as Boston's everyday first baseman. Receiving a standing ovation from the Boston fans in his first game at Braves Field on May 29, he showed enough speed for an infield hit. Two days later, he hit a home run that bounced through the window of a bus passing the ballpark. Returning to Sportsman's Park for a series against the Cardinals in July, he was honored with a flower basket, a silver tea service, and a letter from St. Louis mayor Victor J. Miller in a pregame presentation on July 7. In 118 games for Boston, Sisler had four home runs and 68 RBIs, also posting a .988 fielding percentage at first base. His .340 batting average put him percentage points ahead of Babe Herman for fourth in the NL.

After batting .222 through May 5, 1929, in one of his slowest-ever starts to a season, Sisler batted .400 in May. He had three-hit games against Pittsburgh and Chicago in August. Playing all 154 games, he batted .326, topping 200 hits (with 205) for the sixth time in his career and leading the Braves in nine offensive categories.

For the second time in three years, Sisler found his first base job threatened, as the Braves were interested in giving the position to Johnny Neun, a speedy player eight years younger than Sisler. The veteran did not start any of Boston's first 19 games, but after the Braves suffered a seven-game losing streak, Sisler resumed his role as the everyday first baseman on May 11. He batted over .300 for the Braves but lost the role to Neun in September, partly because of a leg injury. On September 22, he played his last game for the Braves, going hitless in a pinch hit appearance during a 6–2 loss to the Cubs. In 116 games, he had a .309 batting average, 133 hits, three home runs, and 67 RBIs. However, he stole only seven bases, a sign that his speed was no longer the advantage it once had been. On December 13, the Braves released him.

=== Minor leagues ===
Unsigned by any MLB team in 1931, Sisler joined the minor league Rochester Red Wings of the International League. In the second game of a September 10 doubleheader, Sisler hit a walk-off home run in the bottom of the ninth inning, clinching the International League pennant for Rochester. In 159 games, he batted .303 and struck out just 17 times out of 613 at bats.

In 1932, Sisler joined the Shreveport Sports of the Texas League as their player-manager. The team moved to Tyler, Texas, after a May 4 fire destroyed their ballpark. In 78 games, Sisler batted .287, going 38 consecutive games without striking out at one point. The team, however, struggled. After failing to catch an easy pop fly in midseason, Sisler resigned as manager and retired as an active player.

== Later life ==
In 1933, Sisler partnered with Charles Nelson to open the Sisler-Nelson Sporting Goods Company in St. Louis. That same year, they formed the American Softball Association, building several softball fields with lights for night games around St. Louis to help stimulate interest in the game and the business. He also joined Hornsby for three winters as an instructor at the Ray Doan Baseball School in Hot Springs, Arkansas. In 1936 and 1937, Sisler served as a color commentator for Browns and Cardinals home games broadcast on KWK AM radio. Replacing Honus Wagner in 1938 as the commissioner of the National Baseball Congress, Sisler held the role for many years. He sold his interest in the sporting goods store in 1940 at a profit.

Sisler returned to working with MLB teams in December 1942, when Rickey, then the general manager of the Brooklyn Dodgers, hired him as a special assignment scout for the team. He would attend spring training with the parent club, then scout players at the high school, college, and semi-pro levels, mostly in Missouri and neighboring states, though he would sometimes be sent elsewhere to evaluate a particular player. Sisler was part of a scouting corps that Rickey assigned to evaluate black players, though the scouts thought they were looking for players to fill an all-black baseball team separate from MLB. After seeing the Kansas City Monarchs play in 1945, Sisler was concerned whether Jackie Robinson had enough arm strength to be a Major League shortstop, but felt he had the potential to be a star second baseman. Rickey signed Robinson on October 23, and the ballplayer broke the MLB color barrier two years later on his way to a Hall of Fame career. In 1947, Sisler was reassigned to Brooklyn, where his duties expanded to evaluating Dodger prospects, meeting with the manager and coaches prior to and following each game, and watching games to help Dodger catchers learn what opposing hitters were likely to do. In 1949, Robinson spent hours working with Sisler in spring training, hoping to improve his performance at the plate. "Sisler showed me how to stop lunging, how to check my swing until the last fraction of a second, [and] how to shift my feet and hit to right. I'll never stop being grateful to him," Robinson recalled. Sisler and Rickey worked with future Hall of Famer Duke Snider to teach the young Dodgers hitter to accurately judge the strike zone. Other hitters Sisler instructed and helped improve included outfielder Carl Furillo and Hall of Fame first baseman Gil Hodges. In 1951, he signed future star pitcher Johnny Podres for the Dodgers.

After the Dodgers were edged out by the Philadelphia Phillies in the 1950 NL pennant race, Rickey was dismissed by the team. Taking a job as the Pirates' general manager, he hired Sisler as his Scouting Supervisor, responsible for evaluating prospects within 100 miles of Pittsburgh. He held the position until 1955, when new GM Joe L. Brown relieved him from the role but retained him as a scout. Following the regular season, Sisler and other coaches would tutor top prospects at a post-season minor-league school. Acting on a tip from Clyde Sukeforth, Sisler journeyed to Montreal to see Roberto Clemente play, recommending that Rickey sign the future Hall of Famer. As he had in Brooklyn, Sisler helped his team's players with their hitting. "He ... told me I was taking my eye off the ball. He moved me back in the box so I could watch the ball better. He told me to hit the ball where it was pitched. Warned me not to pull it," recalled outfielder Frank Thomas, who would play for 16 seasons and hit 286 career home runs. "Sisler teaches us to be ready for the fast ball and adjust our swing for the curve. If you're looking for a curve and get a fast ball, you never hit it. But you can cut down on the speed of your swing to hit the curve," said 1960 NL MVP Dick Groat. In 1961, Sisler had Clemente switch to a heavier bat. Clemente won the league batting title that season.

Sisler's duties with the Pirates changed again in 1963, when the ballclub assigned him to be a scout for the St. Louis area responsible for evaluating NL players. Sisler also instructed players in spring training and coached a fall instructional league team in Chandler, Arizona. Hall of Fame Pirate first baseman Willie Stargell was one of the Chandler team's alumni.

== Legacy ==
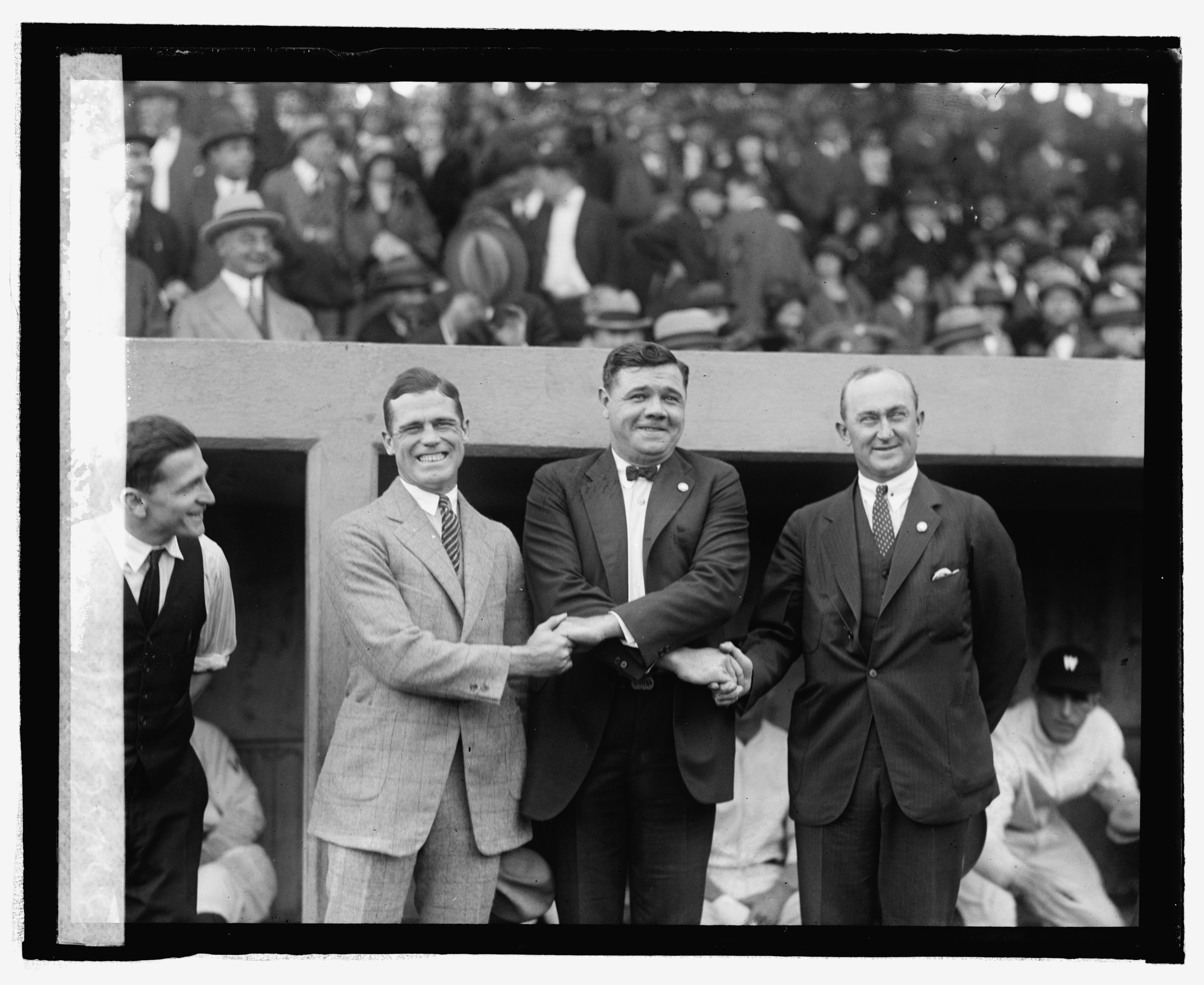
Sisler (left) with Babe Ruth (center) and Ty Cobb

Sisler became one of the first entrants elected to the Baseball Hall of Fame in 1939. Though voting had first been held in 1936, Sisler was part of the first group inducted when the Hall of Fame opened in June 1939. "I think it's the greatest honor the game can offer a retired player and it's a satisfaction to know that your career is still remembered, years after you have hung up your glove", he said.

In his prime, Sisler would always try to control where his hits ended up. He batted flat-footed, using a stance that would enable him to hit either to left or to right field. Among baseball's fastest runners, he stole 30 or more bases six times in his career, leading his league in stolen bases in four seasons. Although he twice finished second to Ruth in the AL in home runs, Sisler was not a pure power hitter; his specialty was hitting for a high batting average. He finished his career with a .340 mark, and he was the only AL player besides Cobb to twice hit over .400. In the peak of his career, his fielding earned him comparisons with Hal Chase, a former star blacklisted from baseball for gambling on the sport, but considered one of baseball's best fielders. Though Sisler led his league in errors multiple times after his vision troubles, he was an aggressive fielder before the ailment. A successful pitcher in college, he seldom pitched in the Major Leagues (24 games with 12 starts), but he did post a 2.35 career ERA in 111 innings pitched, and twice defeated Hall of Fame Senator Walter Johnson in complete game outings. Rickey said that Sisler "was the smartest hitter who ever lived. He was a professional with the bat in his hands. He never stopped thinking ... In the field, he was the acme of grace and fluency."

During his career, Sisler drew comparisons to the leading players of his day, such as Cobb, Ruth, and Tris Speaker. Bill Lamberty of the Society for American Baseball Research describes him as "[a]rguably the first great first baseman of the twentieth century", and quotes a fulsome contemporary writer who claimed that Sisler possessed "dazzling ability of the Cobbesque type. He is just as fast, showy, and sensational, very nearly if not quite as good as a natural hitter, as fast in speed of foot, an even better fielder, and gifted with a versatility Cobb himself might envy." Wray compared Sisler with Ruth before the two met for a series in 1920, Ruth's first year with the New York Yankees, first year as a full-time outfielder, and a breakout season in which he raised his own Major League home run record from 29 to a sensational 54: "Ruth stands out before the world as the more striking figure because of the spectacular nature of his blows [home runs]", but over-generously claimed that "the cumulative effect of his [Sisler's] efforts would probably surpass those of his rival." Hall of Fame pitcher Christy Mathewson wrote in 1922 that Sisler was "every bit as valuable as Ruth, some people think more valuable", noticing also that Sisler was much humbler than his New York counterpart. Two years before, writer Floyd Bell had also described Sisler as "modest, almost to a point of bashfulness, as far from egotism as a blushing debutante ... Shift the conversation to Sisler himself and he becomes a clam."

In 1999 editors at The Sporting News compiled a list of "Baseball's 100 Greatest Players" and ranked Sisler 33rd (and Ruth first). Outside of St. Louis' Busch Stadium, there is a statue of Sisler. He is also honored with a star on the St. Louis Walk of Fame. While in St. Louis for the 2009 All-Star game, Ichiro Suzuki, who had broken Sisler's hit record, visited Sisler's grave. Tarpon Springs, Florida, honored George by naming the former spring training home of the St. Louis Browns "Sisler Field". The playing surface is still in use by various local teams.

== Personal life ==
In 1913, Sisler met his future wife, Kathleen Charlotte Holznagle. Both were involved in Greek life at the University of Michigan. They were married on October 21, 1916.

Sisler did not consume alcohol or tobacco, and he refrained from swearing. In the first years of his career, he attended a Presbyterian church. As he battled eye trouble in 1923, Browns part-owner Walter Fritsch suggested he "look into" Christian Science. Soon a strong believer in its power, Sisler had spiritual adviser Dr. John Randall Dunn accompany him to Browns spring training in 1924, when he made his comeback.

Sisler discussed hitting in a 1934 pamphlet entitled The Knack of Batting and in a 1954 book entitled Sisler on Baseball: A Manual for Players and Coaches. Sportscaster Red Barber said in 1969 that the book was "still the definitive book on hitting".

After spending eight days at St. Louis's St. Mary's Hospital, Sisler died in Richmond Heights, Missouri, on March 26, 1973, of kidney failure exacerbated by heart trouble. His death came two days after his 80th birthday. His funeral was in St. Louis a few days later, and his cremated remains were laid to rest at the Des Peres Presbyterian Church Cemetery.

Sisler's sons Dick and Dave were major league players in the 1950s. Sisler was a Dodgers scout in 1950 when Dick hit a game-winning home run against Brooklyn to clinch the pennant for the Phillies and eliminate the second-place Dodgers. Asked after the pennant-winning game how he felt when his son hit the home run, George replied, "I felt awful and terrific at the same time." Another son, George Jr., served as a minor league executive and as the president of the International League. The Sislers had one other child, daughter Frances. Frances, who was 80 at the time, was in attendance when Ichiro Suzuki surpassed George’s all-time single-season hit record and was greeted warmly by Suzuki after his record-breaking hit.

== Career statistics ==
Sisler accumulated a .340 lifetime batting average and stole 375 bases over his 16 year major league career. He had 200 or more hits in six seasons. He hit over .300 thirteen times, including two seasons over .400; only in 1926 did he post a full-season average below .300. He led the AL in stolen bases four times, stealing over 25 every year and winning three crowns from 1916 through 1922, peaking with 51 in '22, and winning a fourth in 1927. Sisler recorded one six-hit game, four five-hit games, and 60 four-hit games in his 15-year MLB career. He also had a 41-game hitting streak in 1922 and a 34-game streak in 1925.

The Browns moved to Baltimore in 1954 and became the Orioles; Sisler holds the franchise career records with 145 career triples and 351 stolen bases, as of 2026. He also holds the franchise single season records for batting average (.420, 1922), on-base percentage (.467, 1922), hits (257, 1920), on-base plus slugging (1.082, 1920), and total bases (399, 1920). He also posted a career pitching record of 5–6 with a 2.35 earned run average in 24 career appearances.

== Managerial record ==
Team	Year	Regular season					Postseason			
Team	Year	Games	Won	Lost	Win %	Finish	Won	Lost	Win %	Result
SLB	1924	152	74	78	.487	4th in AL	–	–	–	–
SLB	1925	153	82	71	.536	3rd in AL	–	–	–	–
SLB	1926	154	62	92	.403	7th in AL	–	–	–	–
Total		459	218	241	.475		0	0	–	

== See also ==
- Major League Baseball titles leaders
- List of Major League Baseball hit records
- List of Major League Baseball career batting average leaders
- List of Major League Baseball career hits leaders
- List of Major League Baseball career runs scored leaders
- List of Major League Baseball career runs batted in leaders
- List of Major League Baseball career stolen bases leaders
- List of Major League Baseball career triples leaders
- List of Major League Baseball batting champions
- List of Major League Baseball annual runs scored leaders
- List of Major League Baseball annual stolen base leaders
- List of Major League Baseball annual triples leaders
- List of Major League Baseball players with a .400 batting average in a season
- List of Major League Baseball single-game hits leaders
- List of Major League Baseball players to hit for the cycle
- List of Major League Baseball player-managers
- List of baseball players who went directly to Major League Baseball
- University of Michigan Athletic Hall of Honor

== Notes ==
Preceded by Ty Cobb	Single season base hit record holders 1920–2004	Succeeded by Ichiro Suzuki
Preceded by Cliff Heathcote; Dave Bancroft	Hitting for the cycle August 8, 1920; August 13, 1921	Succeeded by George Burns; Dave Robertson
Preceded by Eduard Benes	Cover of Time magazine March 30, 1925	Succeeded by John Ringling
