= 1944 Philadelphia Athletics season =

1944 Philadelphia Athletics
- League: American League
- Ballpark: Shibe Park
- City: Philadelphia
- Record: 72–82 (.468)
- League place: T–5th
- Owners: Connie Mack
- Managers: Connie Mack
- Radio: WIBG (By Saam, Claude Haring, Doug Arthur)

The 1944 Philadelphia Athletics season involved the A's finishing fifth in the American League with a record of 72 wins and 82 losses.

== Offseason ==
=== Spring training ===
The Athletics considered using the Bader Field ballpark in Atlantic City for their 1944 spring training site. On November 17, 1943, Connie Mack examined Bader Field and the National Guard Armory as one possibility. But he knew the New York Yankees were already considering it. The A's went to McCurdy Field in Frederick, Maryland when the Yankees chose Atlantic City.

=== Notable transactions ===
- October 11, 1943: Don Heffner and Bob Swift were traded by the Athletics to the Detroit Tigers for Rip Radcliff.
- February 17, 1944: Sam Zoldak and Barney Lutz (minors) were traded by the Athletics to the St. Louis Browns for Frankie Hayes.

== Regular season ==
=== Season standings ===
American League
Team	W	L	Pct.	GB	Home	Road
St. Louis Browns	89	65	.578	—	54‍–‍23	35‍–‍42
Detroit Tigers	88	66	.571	1	43‍–‍34	45‍–‍32
New York Yankees	83	71	.539	6	47‍–‍31	36‍–‍40
Boston Red Sox	77	77	.500	12	47‍–‍30	30‍–‍47
Cleveland Indians	72	82	.468	17	39‍–‍38	33‍–‍44
Philadelphia Athletics	72	82	.468	17	39‍–‍37	33‍–‍45
Chicago White Sox	71	83	.461	18	41‍–‍36	30‍–‍47
Washington Senators	64	90	.416	25	40‍–‍37	24‍–‍53

=== Record vs. opponents ===
1944 American League record Sources:
Team	BOS	CWS	CLE	DET	NYY	PHA	SLB	WSH
Boston	—	17–5	8–14	10–12–2	11–11	11–11	10–12	10–12
Chicago	5–17	—	14–8	9–13	10–12	9–13	8–14	16–6
Cleveland	14–8	8–14	—	10–12	8–14	12–10–1	10–12	10–12
Detroit	12–10–2	13–9	12–10	—	14–8	11–11	9–13	17–5
New York	11–11	12–10	14–8	8–14	—	13–9	10–12	15–7
Philadelphia	11–11	13–9	10–12–1	11–11	9–13	—	9–13	9–13
St. Louis	12–10	14–8	12–10	13–9	12–10	13–9	—	13–9
Washington	12–10	6–16	12–10	5–17	7–15	13–9	9–13	—

=== Notable transactions ===
- April 15, 1944: Al Simmons was signed as a free agent by the Athletics.

=== Roster ===
1944 Philadelphia Athletics
Roster
Pitchers: 23 Tal Abernathy; 20 Joe Berry; 21 Don Black; 17 Russ Christopher; 19 Jesse Flores; 31 Luke Hamlin; 18 Lum Harris; 3 John McGillen; 16 Bobo Newsom; 24 Carl Scheib; 30 Woody Wheaton	Catchers: 15 Bob Garbark; 8 Frankie Hayes; 23 Bill Mills; 10 Tony Parisse; -- Jim Pruett; 9 Hal Wagner; Infielders: 22 Joe Burns; 2 Ed Busch; 6 Irv Hall; 7 George Kell; 11 Bill McGhee; 12 Joe Rullo; 5 Dick Siebert; 23 Bobby Wilkins	Outfielders: 11 Bill Burgo; 3 Hal Epps; 4 Bobby Estalella; 14 Lew Flick; 9 Ford Garrison; 14 Charlie Metro; -- Hal Peck; 12 Larry Rosenthal; 28,32 Al Simmons; 1 Jo-Jo White	Manager: Connie Mack; Coaches: 26 Earle Brucker; 29 Dave Keefe; 27 Earle Mack; 32 Al Simmons

== Player stats ==
=== Batting ===
==== Starters by position ====
Note: Pos = Position; G = Games played; AB = At bats; H = Hits; Avg. = Batting average; HR = Home runs; RBI = Runs batted in

Pos	Player	G	AB	H	Avg.	HR	RBI
C	Frankie Hayes	155	581	144	.248	13	78
1B	Dick Siebert	132	468	143	.306	6	52
2B	Irv Hall	143	559	150	.268	0	45
SS	Ed Busch	140	484	131	.271	0	40
3B	George Kell	139	514	138	.268	0	44
OF	Jo-Jo White	85	267	59	.221	1	21
OF	Ford Garrison	121	449	121	.269	4	37
OF	Bobby Estalella	140	506	151	.298	7	60

==== Other batters ====
Note: G = Games played; AB = At bats; H = Hits; Avg. = Batting average; HR = Home runs; RBI = Runs batted in

Player	G	AB	H	Avg.	HR	RBI
Bill McGhee	77	287	83	.289	1	19
Hal Epps	67	229	60	.262	0	13
Joe Rullo	35	96	16	.167	0	5
Bill Burgo	27	88	21	.239	1	3
Joe Burns	28	75	18	.240	1	8
Woody Wheaton	30	59	11	.186	0	5
Larry Rosenthal	32	54	11	.204	1	6
Charlie Metro	24	40	4	.100	0	1
Lew Flick	19	35	4	.114	0	2
Bobby Wilkins	24	25	6	.240	0	3
Bob Garbark	18	23	6	.261	0	2
Hal Peck	2	8	2	.250	0	1
Al Simmons	4	6	3	.500	0	2
Jim Pruett	3	4	1	.250	0	0
Bill Mills	5	4	1	.250	0	0
Hal Wagner	5	4	1	.250	0	0
Tony Parisse	4	4	0	.000	0	0

=== Pitching ===
==== Starting pitchers ====
Note: G = Games pitched; IP = Innings pitched; W = Wins; L = Losses; ERA = Earned run average; SO = Strikeouts

Player	G	IP	W	L	ERA	SO
Bobo Newsom	37	265.0	13	15	2.82	142
Russ Christopher	35	215.1	14	14	2.97	84
Luke Hamlin	29	190.0	6	12	3.74	58
Jesse Flores	27	185.2	9	11	3.39	65
Don Black	29	177.1	10	12	4.06	78
Lum Harris	23	174.1	10	9	3.30	33

==== Relief pitchers ====
Note: G = Games pitched; W = Wins; L = Losses; SV = Saves; ERA = Earned run average; SO = Strikeouts

Player	G	W	L	SV	ERA	SO
Joe Berry	53	10	8	12	1.94	44
Carl Scheib	15	0	0	0	4.21	13
Woody Wheaton	11	0	1	0	3.55	15
John McGillen	2	0	0	0	18.00	0
Tal Abernathy	1	0	0	0	3.00	2

== Farm system ==
Level	Team	League	Manager
A	Elmira Pioneers	Eastern League	Al Todd
B	Lancaster Red Roses	Interstate League	Lena Blackburne

LEAGUE CHAMPIONS: Lancaster
