= List of bespectacled baseball players =

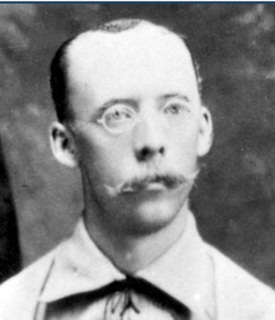
William Henry "Whoop-La" White

In baseball, players rarely wear spectacles, but some players played in the major leagues with glasses. For many years, wearing glasses while playing the sport was an embarrassment. Baseball talent scouts routinely rejected spectacled prospects on sight. The stigma had diminished by the early 1960s and by one estimate 20 percent of major league players wore glasses by the end of the 1970s. The development of shatter-resistant lenses in the latter half of the 1940s contributed to their acceptance.

The first major-league player to wear spectacles was Will 'Whoop-La' White in 1878–86. Only pitchers dared wear glasses while playing until the early 1920s, when George 'Specs' Toporcer of the St. Louis Cardinals became the first outfielder to sport eyewear. Bespectacled pitchers are less rare as they have less need to field the ball.

There are only four players in the Baseball Hall of Fame to have worn eyeglasses during play: Chick Hafey, Reggie Jackson, Greg Maddux, and Dick Allen. Because his vision became so variable, Hafey was obliged to rotate among three different pairs of glasses.

== List ==
=== Non-pitchers ===
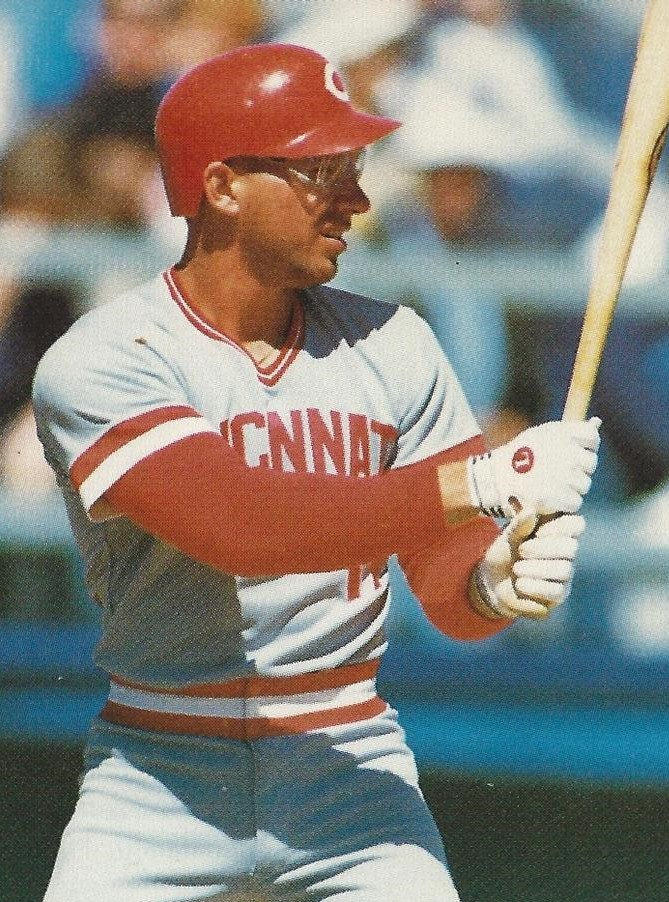
Chris Sabo wearing glasses while batting during a game in 1988

Other notable non-pitchers who wore glasses include:

- Dick Allen — first American League MVP to wear glasses
- Nick Allen
- Jay Bell
- Jonah Bride
- Ike Brown
- Horace Clarke
- Alex Cole
- Bob Coluccio
- Clint Courtney — first catcher to wear glasses
- Al Cowens
- Alvin Davis - 1984 AL Rookie of The Year
- Mike Davis
- Bob Dillinger
- Dom DiMaggio — "The Little Professor"
- Brian Downing
- Leon Durham
- Del Ennis
- Alvaro Espinoza
- Tim Foli
- Dan Ford
- Freddie Freeman — Typically wore contact lenses throughout his career, but occasionally wore glasses in 2012. Opted to get LASIK in 2017.
- Atsuya Furuta
- Randal Grichuk
- Johnny Grubb
- Yuli Gurriel
- Chick Hafey
- Jerry Hairston
- Bob Hamelin
- Bryce Harper — Typically wears contact lenses, but wore prescription eyeglasses in 2018.
- Enrique Hernández
- Frank Howard
- Danny Jansen
- Reggie Jackson
- Greg Jones
- Eddie Joost Shortstop, career spanned 3 decades, both NL and AL
- Ron Kittle
- Carney Lansford
- Vance Law
- Brett Lawrie
- Stan Lopata — the first National League catcher to wear glasses
- John Lowenstein
- Greg Luzinski
- Drew Maggi
- Patrick Mazeika
- Brian McCann
- Roy McMillan
- Wade Meckler
- Mario Mendoza
- Andruw Monasterio
- Kendrys Morales
- Rance Mulliniks
- Max Muncy
- Sean Murphy
- Joe Nolan
- Mel Ott
- Mitchell Page
- Richie Palacios
- Dan Pasqua
- Ken Phelps
- Jason Phillips
- Darrell Porter
- Luke Raley
- Harold Ramírez
- Dave Ricketts
- Cookie Rojas
- Chris Sabo
- Blake Sabol
- Lenn Sakata
- Yolmer Sánchez
- Pablo Sandoval
- Davis Schneider
- Pat Sheridan
- Eric Sogard
- Andrew Stevenson
- Andre Thornton
- Kelby Tomlinson — Became a certified optician in 2020.
- George 'Specs' Toporcer
- Earl Torgeson — Replied "Because I want to be able to see." when asked by Jack Brickhouse why he wore glasses when he played.
- Bill Virdon
- Paul Waner
- Bob Watson
- Glenn Wilson
- Steve Yeager

=== Pitchers ===
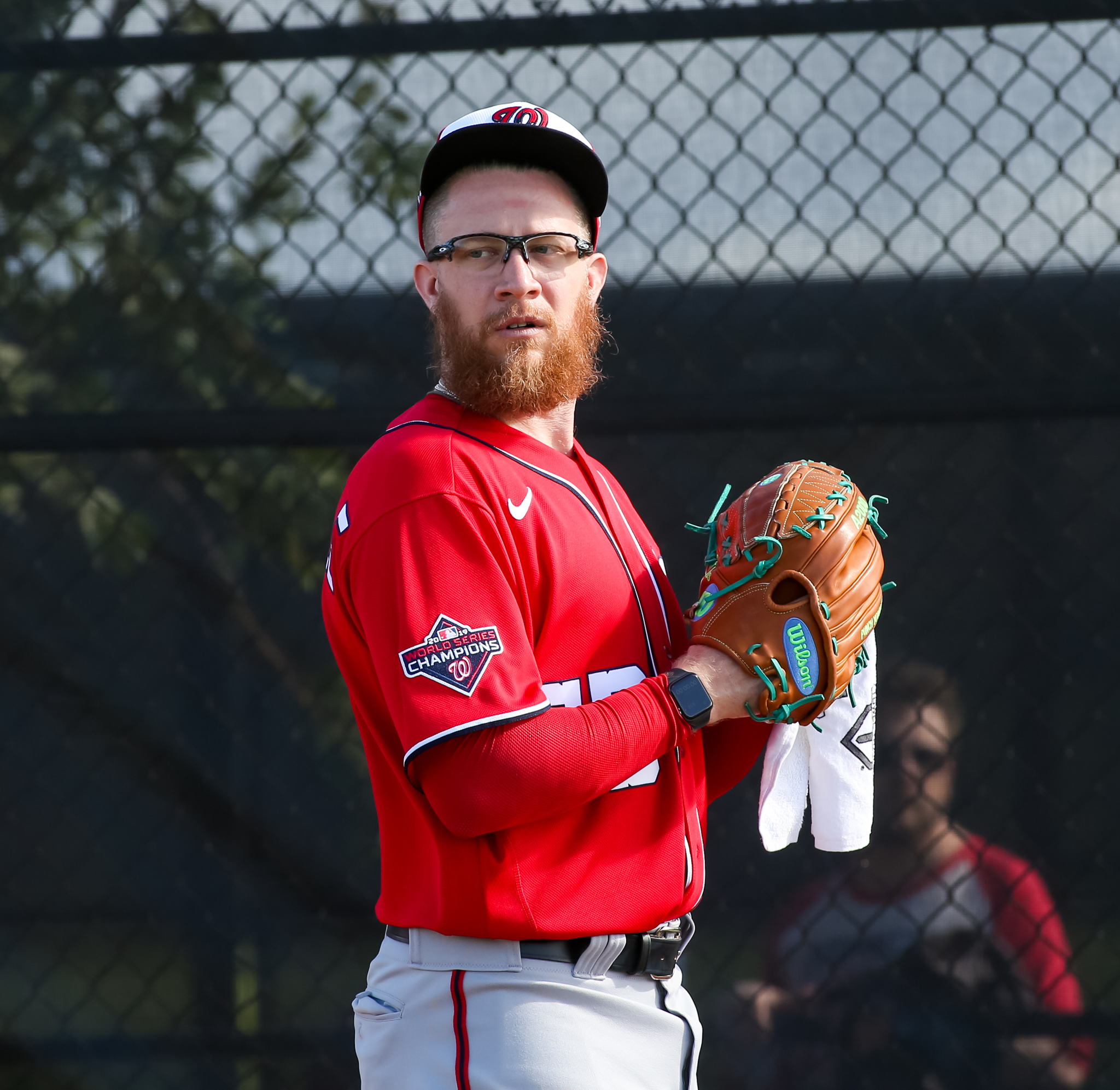
Sean Doolittle wearing glasses while warming up for a 2020 spring training game

Pitchers who wear or have worn glasses include:

- Henderson Álvarez
- Aaron Ashby
- Javier Assad
- Keith Atherton
- Anthony Banda
- Eduard Bazardo
- Boom-Boom Beck
- Ronald Belisario
- Tanner Bibee
- Joe Boyle
- Corbin Burnes — (originally, before having lasik)
- Noah Cameron
- Isaiah Campbell
- Brett Cecil
- Gustavo Chacin
- Jesse Chavez
- Tyler Clippard
- Ron Davis
- Bill Dietrich
- Randy Dobnak
- Sean Doolittle
- Dane Dunning
- Ryne Duren — once hit a batter in the on-deck circle
- Logan Evans
- Kyle Farnsworth
- Brady Feigl
- Josh Fleming
- J. P. France
- Éric Gagné
- Zac Gallen
- Scott Garrelts
- Kevin Gregg
- A. J. Griffin
- Josh Hader
- JD Hammer
- Mel Harder
- Tom Henke
- Jimmy Herget
- Carmen Hill
- Jeff Hoffman
- Dick Hughes
- Tom Hume
- Tyrell Jenkins
- Anthony Kay
- Joe Kelly
- Jim Konstanty
- Jesús Luzardo
- 'Deacon Danny' MacFayden
- Zach Maxwell
- Denny McLain
- Craig McMurtry
- Lee Meadows
- Pete Mikkelsen
- Alec Mills
- Greg Minton
- Peter Moylan
- Óliver Pérez
- Eric Plunk
- Matt Purke
- Edwar Ramírez
- Cody Reed
- Ethan Roberts
- Nate Robertson
- Bradgley Rodríguez
- Francisco Rodríguez
- Ryan Rowland-Smith
- Andrew Saalfrank
- Chase Shugart
- Dave Sisler
- Devin Smeltzer
- D. J. Snelten
- Nick Snyder
- Vic Sorrell of the Detroit Tigers
- Paul Splittorff
- Kent Tekulve
- Trent Thornton
- Julio Urías
- José Valverde
- Bob Veale
- Fernando Valenzuela
- Tyler Webb
- Jordan Wicks
- Vance Worley
