= Dave Sisler =

American baseball player (1931–2011)

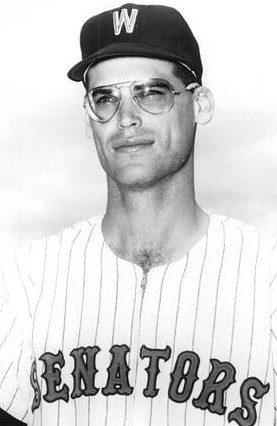
- Sisler in 1961
- Pitcher
- Born: October 16, 1931; St. Louis, Missouri, U.S.
- Died: January 9, 2011 (aged 79); St. Louis, Missouri, U.S.
- Batted: Right Threw: Right

MLB debut
- April 21, 1956, for the Boston Red Sox

Last MLB appearance
- September 23, 1962, for the Cincinnati Reds

MLB statistics
- Win–loss record: 38–44
- Earned run average: 4.33
- Strikeouts: 355
- Stats at Baseball Reference

Teams
- Boston Red Sox (1956–1959); Detroit Tigers (1959–1960); Washington Senators (1961); Cincinnati Reds (1962)

David Michael Sisler (October 16, 1931 – January 9, 2011) was an American professional baseball pitcher who played in Major League Baseball (MLB) from 1956 through 1962. Early in his career, Sisler was a starter, then later was used as a middle reliever and occasionally as a closer. He reached the majors in 1956 with the Boston Red Sox after he completed a two-year obligation with the U.S. Army. After three-and-a-half seasons with the Red Sox, he was traded to the Detroit Tigers in 1959 and served the team through the 1960 season. Before the 1961 season, he was selected by the Washington Senators in the 1960 Major League Baseball expansion draft, for whom he played the 1961 season. He was then traded to the Cincinnati Reds in 1962, playing one season at the major league level, and one in their minor league system.

His most productive years came with Boston, where he won 24 games from 1956 to 1958, averaging 138 innings each season. After that, he appeared strictly as a reliever and saved a career-high 11 games for the Senators. In a seven-season career, Sisler posted a 38–44 record with a 4.33 ERA in 247 appearances, including 29 saves, 12 complete games, one shutout and 656 1/3 innings. Sisler retired from baseball after the 1963 season to become an investment firm executive, a career that lasted for over 30 years, retiring as a vice-chairman for A.G. Edwards.

His father, Hall of Famer George Sisler; and one of his brothers, Dick Sisler, also played baseball at the major league level; while another brother, George Sisler, Jr., was a general manager for several minor league baseball teams, and later became president of the International League from 1966 to 1976.

== Early life ==
Sisler was born on October 16, 1931, in St. Louis, Missouri, to George Sisler, a Baseball Hall of Fame player, and Kathleen. He played baseball and two other sports at John Burroughs School. When he was 16, he went to work for his father, a coach in the Brooklyn Dodgers organization, who allowed him to keep statistics and occasionally to pitch. The Dodgers did not pursue a contract with him, due in part to his commitment to Princeton University and future military obligation. He played baseball and basketball at Princeton, where in 1951, his earned-run average was 0.99.

After Sisler graduated, magna cum laude, he was signed by the Boston Red Sox of the American League (AL), and began his professional baseball career at the age of 21 in 1953 for the Albany Senators in the class-A Eastern League. He pitched in 21 games that season, 20 as their starting pitcher; he had a 12–7 win–loss record and an ERA of 2.60 in 135 innings pitched. He was the last pitcher from Princeton to start a major league game until Chris Young in "2004".

In 1954 and 1955, he served on active duty in the U.S. Army and did not play professional baseball.

== Major League career ==
=== Boston Red Sox ===
After his military commitment, he re-joined the organization and began the season with the Red Sox. He made his major league debut on April 26, 1956, a one-inning relief appearance against the New York Yankees. His first MLB victory came seven days later, a three-inning relief appearance against the Yankees in Boston. On August 5, in his sixth start, he pitched a seven-inning complete game 2-1 victory over the Cleveland Indians and their pitching star, future Hall of Famer Bob Lemon. In total, he appeared in 39 games his first season, 14 as their starting pitcher, had a 9–8 win–loss record with three saves, 98 strikeouts, and a 4.66 ERA in 142 1/3 inning pitched. He tied for the AL league with a 1.000 fielding percentage by not committing a single error, although he had the sixth highest total of hit batsmen with seven. Following the season, Sisler was praised for his performance; he was selected by Boston area sportswriters as the "Harry Agganis Award" winner, given annually to whom they voted as the top Boston Red Sox rookie, and was named to the 1956 "Rookie All-Star Team".

On January 17, 1957, Sisler was re-signed by the Red Sox. The Red Sox expected Sisler to be a candidate for a pitching rotation slot. He impressed his coaching staff during early spring practices, manager Mike "Pinky" Higgins commented that Sisler "looks good; he's more mature and shows more confidence". When the regular season began, he was initially effective, winning three games against one defeat in his first four starts, including two complete game victories against the Yankees. At this point, he was 4–0 against the Yankees, earning him the moniker "Yankee Killer" from sportswriter Chester L. Smith of the Pittsburgh Press. Although his ERA of 4.88 was considered high, it was due in large part to his loss against the Kansas City Athletics who scored six earned runs in just two innings. On July 4, he defeated the Yankees once again, making him 5–0 against them in his career, and 7–4 overall for the 1957 season, and had lowered his ERA to 4.02. That was his last victory of the season, however, which he followed with two consecutive losses, pitching a total of four innings; he did not appear in another game until September 2. He recorded a save against the Baltimore Orioles on September 7, but closed the season with two consecutive losses against the Yankees, though he pitched well in the second game, giving up just three hits and two earned runs in eight innings. His season totals include a 7–8 record, and a 4.72 ERA in 122 1/3 inning pitched.

Sisler began the 1958 spring training in spectacular form, pitching a total of nine hitless innings and allowed just one baserunner in 28 batters faced; the last 27 in order. However, he finished the spring with two consecutive losses, including one to the Pittsburgh Pirates, with whom his father was a special assistant to their manager. He opened the regular season with a complete game victory against the Yankees on April 16. On May 2, he pitched his only career complete game shutout, a 6–0 victory against the Detroit Tigers and future Hall of Famer Jim Bunning, improving his record to 3–1 for the season. Over the next two months, his average innings pitched declined during his starts, and on several occasions he entered the game in relief. He went winless from June 12 to August 9, when he defeated the Yankees. He recorded just one more victory in 1958, and completed the season with an 8–9 record, a 4.94 ERA, and 71 strikeouts in a career-high 149 1/3 innings pitched.

On February 8, 1959, the Red Sox announced that they had Sisler signed for the 1959 season. After what was considered a "disappointing" season, he did not impress with his first outing in spring training, giving up two hits and five bases on balls in just two innings of work. Lack of pitching depth was a noted weakness for the Red Sox entering the season, with unpredictable youth and with hopes that Sisler could regain his previous level of success. Sisler opened the season slated as a relief pitcher with the idea that he would start in certain cases. In three relief appearances through April, he had a 6.75 ERA in 6 2/3 inning pitched. Management decided that his performance along with a pitching staff that they considered inexperienced, Sisler and Ted Lepcio were traded to the Detroit Tigers on May 2 for starting pitcher Billy Hoeft.

=== Detroit Tigers ===
Hoeft, who won 20 games for the Tigers in 1956, had continually under-performed since, and was noted for being in the manager's "doghouse"; however, TimesDaily sportswriter Hap Halbrooks commented, "I can't see where they (Tigers) gained a thing in this transaction." The Tigers had lost 15 of their first 17 games of the season before the trade and decided that changes were needed. In addition to the Sisler trade they fired manager Bill Norman and replaced him with Jimmy Dykes. These moves initially proved effective, sparking a winning game streak, which began by defeating the Yankees in both games of a doubleheader on May 3. Continuing their rebound, the Tigers faced the Red Sox next, winning two of three, and Sisler pitched a scoreless one-inning relief appearance against his former team on May 6. Used exclusively in relief, Sisler pitched in 32 games for the Tigers, winning one game against three losses and collected seven saves, which was seventh most in the AL, and he did not record an error.

Sisler returned to the Tigers for the 1960 season, and manager Dykes noted that he was not confident that his bullpen could help when needed, pointing to the previous season as a reference. The Tigers bullpen had won just nine games in 1959, but began 1960 with three straight victories, with Sisler pitching a scoreless two-inning appearance on April 22. His performance was considered a surprise, due to having a poor spring training. Although he pitched well in his first game of the season, he quickly lost his form, and by May 18, his ERA had risen to 5.06 and had a 1–2 record. It was at this point in the season that he began to turn his fortunes around and regained his effectiveness, and by August 12 he had lowered his ERA to 1.90. His season totals included a 2.47 ERA and a 7-5 win–loss record, both career bests, and added six saves in 80 innings pitched.

=== Washington Senators ===
After the 1960 season, it was announced that the AL were going to create two new teams, one in Los Angeles and one in Washington, D. C. Although he was thought of as the Tigers' best reliever during the season, Sisler was listed by the Tigers as eligible for the 1960 Major League Baseball expansion draft. The draft occurred on December 14, 1960 and Sisler was selected by the Washington Senators with the fourth overall pick. The Senators received communication from several teams that were interested in Sisler, namely the Milwaukee Braves of the National League (NL) and the Athletics, but decided to trade their first pick in the expansion draft, Bobby Shantz, instead. New manager Mickey Vernon defined Sisler's role with the team before the season began, designating him as their top relief pitcher. Sisler felt slighted by the Tigers, having been left unprotected by the team, and had considered retiring from baseball, but ultimately decided to sign with the Senators.

Sisler was solid for much of the first half of the season, not allowing an earned run until May 19, and by June 5 he had an ERA of 0.74, a 1–0 record with seven saves. It was at the point that his effectiveness declined rapidly, allowing runs to score in four of his next five appearances. In a game against the Red Sox on June 18, he relieved starter Carl Mathias, and immediately gave up bases on balls to the first two batters he faced, which forced in two runs, then gave up a grand slam to Jim Pagliaroni. He followed with another base on balls, and was relieved without having recording an out. Over the course of the next couple months, with his ERA steadily rising, his playing time was lessened, making just six appearances in the month of July, and five in August. He made his last major league start on August 31 against the Tigers, giving up seven hits and six earned runs for the loss. In 45 total appearances in 1961, he had a 2–8 win–loss record and finished sixth in AL with 11 saves. On September 16, the Senators agreed to send $75,000 ($808,050 current dollar adjustment) and a player to be named later to the Cincinnati Reds of the NL for pitcher Claude Osteen. To complete the transaction, Washington sent Sisler to the Reds as that player named on November 28.

=== Cincinnati Reds ===
The Reds were the NL champions in 1961, and with the addition of Sisler, Dave Hillman, and Moe Drabowsky to ensure stability to their pitching staff in 1962, the team's management had high hopes of a return to the World Series. Sisler, who was expected to be used as a relief pitcher, joined a Reds team that already had his brother Dick, who was their first base coach. His father, still with Pittsburgh, mentioned that he was relieved that his son did not play in a recent series between the Pirates and Reds, recalling how the mixed emotions he felt when his elder son, Dick, helped defeat the Dodgers in an important game in 1950 by hitting a home run. The younger Sisler's season did not begin well; in his ten appearances by June 5, he allowed a run in all but three, and had a 4.97 ERA. On June 19, Sisler pitched a scoreless inning in victory against the Pirates, the first time George watched his son pitch as an opponent. Although Sisler's season was a disappointment, he completed the season well, allowing just one earned run over the course of his final eight games, as well as earning the victory on September 23, his final major league appearance. His totals for the season included a 4–3 record, a 3.92 ERA, and one save in 43 2/3 innings pitched.

For the coming 1963 season, manager Fred Hutchinson envisioned the same the role for Sisler, coming out of the bullpen with the idea that he would occasionally start. The Reds announced on February 9 that Sisler had signed for the 1963 season, although he did not make the Reds' NL club and was optioned to their class-AAA team, the San Diego Padres of the Pacific Coast League (PCL). In 35 games pitched for the Padres, he started six, had a 6–9 record and a 3.40 ERA in 90 innings. On March 18, 1964, it was announced that Sisler retired from baseball to join an Investment company.

== Later life ==
After his baseball career, Sisler was an executive with the investment firm A.G. Edwards for more than 30 years, reaching the level of vice-chairman. A.G. Edwards was a sponsor of a semi-professional baseball team in St. Petersburg, Florida; when the "Stockbrokers" were invited to play in season-ending tournament to decide a champion, Sisler, a senior executive for the firm, denied the funding for the team, forcing them to decline if no other monies were raised. It was an unexpected decision considering that Sisler was former baseball player, but he did not feel that A.G. Edwards was benefitting, with the costs of running the team becoming more than originally agreed to by contract.

In 2004, the possibility arose of his father's record of 257 hits in a season being surpassed by Ichiro Suzuki of the Seattle Mariners. Living in Dallas, Texas at the time, Sisler and his son Dave followed Ichiro's progress throughout the season. Both had mixed feelings about the record chase; they were happy that George Sisler's name was being talked about and that people were re-discovering him as a player, but both were hoping that, if the record was not broken in 154 games, there would be an asterisk noting that it took Ichiro more games to achieve it. Ichiro finished the season with 262 hits, and the Mariners extended an invitation for the entire Sisler family to attend the celebration at Safeco Field. The younger Sisler was prevented by an emergency heart procedure from travelling to Seattle. Both remarked that the Mariners were a classy organization for extending the invitation.

Sisler died on January 9, 2011 of prostate cancer at the age of 79 in St. Louis, Missouri, and is interred at Des Peres Presbyterian Church Cemetery in Frontenac, Missouri. He was survived by his wife Janet, son, and three grandchildren.

== See also ==
- List of second-generation Major League Baseball players
