= Wally Holborow =

American baseball player

- Pitcher
- Born: November 30, 1913; New York City
- Died: July 14, 1986 (aged 72); Fort Lauderdale, Florida
- Batted: Right Threw: Right

MLB debut
- September 27, 1944, for the Washington Senators

Last MLB appearance
- October 2, 1948, for the Philadelphia Athletics

MLB statistics
- Win–loss record: 2–3
- Earned run average: 3.31
- Innings pitched: 51 2/3
- Stats at Baseball Reference

Teams
- Washington Senators (1944–1945); Philadelphia Athletics (1948)

Walter Albert Holborow (November 30, 1913 – July 14, 1986) was an American semiprofessional baseball player who had a brief career in professional baseball — one year and only three games pitched in the minor leagues in 1937 with the Class C Akron Yankees of the Middle Atlantic League, followed by three stints (1944–1945; 1948) and 21 games pitched in Major League Baseball for the Washington Senators and Philadelphia Athletics. A native of New York City, the right-handed Holborow stood 5 feet 11 inches (1.80 m) and weighed 187 pounds (85 kg).

Holborow's full record at Baseball Reference includes three games in 1937 and then no further appearances in "organized baseball" until his Major League debut with Washington on September 27, 1944, during the peak of the World War II manpower shortage. On that day, Holborow relieved Baby Ortiz in the sixth inning at Cleveland's League Park and pitched three hitless, scoreless innings as the Cleveland Indians won, 6–4. Holborow gave up two bases on balls and struck out one. In 1945 Holborow worked in 15 games, all but one in relief. But in his only Major League starting pitcher assignment, on August 4 at Griffith Stadium, Holborow pitched a complete game, two-hit shutout against the Boston Red Sox as the Senators won, 4–0. Holborow surrendered a double to Catfish Metkovich, a single to Ty LaForest, and three bases on balls. He struck out four.

Holborow appeared in three more games for Washington during 1945, then was out of professional baseball until September 6, 1948, when he made the first of his five appearances on the mound for the Philadelphia Athletics. He went 8 1/3 innings against the Detroit Tigers in a start on September 23, but lost the game 8–7 and gave up 16 hits in the process.
