= Ed Boland =

American baseball player (1908-1993)

- Right fielder
- Born: April 18, 1908; Long Island City, New York, U.S.
- Died: February 5, 1993 (aged 84); Clearwater, Florida, U.S.
- Batted: Left Threw: Left

MLB debut
- September 18, 1934, for the Philadelphia Phillies

Last MLB appearance
- August 14, 1944, for the Washington Senators

MLB statistics
- Batting average: .257
- Home runs: 0
- Runs batted in: 23
- Stats at Baseball Reference

Teams
- Philadelphia Phillies (1934–1935); Washington Senators (1944)

Edward John Boland (April 18, 1908 – February 5, 1993) was an American Major League Baseball right fielder who played for three seasons. He played for the Philadelphia Phillies from 1934 to 1935. After a hiatus from the majors, he returned and played for the Washington Senators in 19 games during the 1944 Washington Senators season.
