= Bill Mills (baseball) =

American professional baseball player (1919–2019)

- Catcher
- Born: November 2, 1919; Boston, Massachusetts, U.S.
- Died: August 9, 2019 (aged 99); Gainesville, Florida, U.S.
- Batted: Right Threw: Right

debut
- May 19, 1944, for the Philadelphia Athletics

Last appearance
- June 3, 1944, for the Philadelphia Athletics

Career statistics
- Batting average: .250
- Home runs: 0
- Runs batted in: 0
- Hits: 1
- Stats at Baseball Reference

Teams
- Philadelphia Athletics (1944)

William Henry Mills Jr. (November 2, 1919 – August 9, 2019), also known as "Buster", was an American catcher who played in Major League Baseball during the 1944 season. Listed at 5 ft 10 in (1.78 m), 175 lb (79 kg), he batted and threw right-handed. Born in Boston, Massachusetts, Mills was one of many ballplayers who appeared in the major leagues only during the World War II years.

== Early life ==
Mills was born on November 2, 1919, in Boston, Massachusetts. He started with the Philadelphia Athletics in 1944 as an unsigned free agent out of Holy Cross, where he was a member of the football and baseball squads from 1939 through 1943. In his senior season, Mills served as the captain of the Crusaders baseball team and won the batting title of the league with a .586 average. He was nicknamed Buster after Colonel Buster Mills, who spent nine seasons in the major leagues as a player or manager.

== Career ==
Mills, who had been rejected by the military draft because of a perforated ear drum, started his professional baseball career in 1944 with the Lancaster Red Roses of the Interstate League, but was promoted to the Athletics in the month of June as the draft was depleting major league rosters of first-line players. He was used primarily as a pinch-hitter in four games and caught one game, going 1-for-4 for a .250 batting average.

Following his major league stint, Mills played in the minor leagues until 1949. Over a five-year career, he posted a .286 average with 17 home runs in 316 games.

== Later life ==
After retirement, Mills returned to his native Boston and pursued a teaching and coaching career at the high school level. Mills died on August 9, 2019, at age 99.

== See also ==
- 1944 Philadelphia Athletics season
