= George Sisler Jr. =

American professional baseball player and executive

Sisler

George Harold Sisler Jr. (August 1, 1917 – December 31, 2006) was an American professional baseball player and executive. The son of Hall of Fame first baseman and two-time .400 hitter George Sisler and the brother of two Major League Baseball players, Dick and Dave, George Jr. was a longtime executive in minor-league baseball, especially in the Triple-A International League (IL); at his death, the IL calculated that Sisler had been associated with that league for 52 of its 124 years of existence. He also served in the majors as chief assistant to St. Louis Cardinals vice president and de facto general manager William Walsingham Jr. during the late 1940s and early 1950s.

A three-sport star at Colgate University, Sisler had a brief playing career in minor-league baseball. Baseball Reference lists him as having played from 1939–1941 in the lowest levels of the minors in the organizations of St. Louis' two MLB teams of the era, the Browns and the Cardinals. After World War II, he focused on his front-office career. In the minors, he was the general manager of the Columbus Red Birds of the Triple-A American Association in 1953 and 1954 before taking over in 1955 as front-office boss of the Cardinals' other top-level affiliate, the Rochester Red Wings of the International League. Sisler spent 11 seasons, through 1965, in the Rochester post, navigating transitions when the Cardinals sold the team to a community organization and, then, in 1961, when the Red Wings ended their 33-year relationship with St. Louis and affiliated with the Baltimore Orioles.

In 1966, Sisler was elected president of the International circuit itself, serving another 11 seasons through 1976. Then, he accepted a new challenge when he returned to Columbus to take the executive reins of the Clippers when that franchise (now in the International League) moved to Ohio's capital from Charleston, West Virginia. He spent 13 seasons (1977–1989) as the Clippers' general manager, with the team winning International League championships in 1979, 1980, 1981 and 1987 and Western Division titles in 1979, 1980, 1981, 1983 and 1984. Sisler then retired to a consulting role, working with the IL office through his formal retirement in 1999 at age 82.

Four times Sisler was selected the International League's Executive of the Year, and in 1989 he was presented with the King of Baseball award given by Minor League Baseball.

Sisler died from Alzheimer's disease in Worthington, Ohio, at age 89. The year after his 2006 death, he was one of the first two new inductees to the resurrected International League Hall of Fame, which had had no new members since 1963.

Preceded by Tommy Richardson	International League president 1966–1976	Succeeded by Roy Jackson
