= Wildwood, North Carolina =

Unincorporated community in North Carolina, US

Coordinates: 34.7451°N 76.8300°W

Wildwood is a small unincorporated community centered on the Wildwood Road, just west of the Morehead City town limits, along US Highway 70, in Carteret County, North Carolina, United States. Newport is the next closest town.

== Community ==
The larger region encompassed by the Wildwood fire district is also sometimes referred to as "Wildwood" by local residents, and contains about 5000 residents. The Wildood Fire Department merged with the Morehead City Fire & EMS on October 1, 2014. The Wildwood Presbyterian Church, located on the Wildwood Road, has been in existence since the 1890s. Wildwood was the home of Jake Wade, baseball pitcher in the 1930s and 1940s. He died on February 1, 2006, at his home in Wildwood at the age of 93.

== Local government ==
Wildwood is located in District 3 for the Carteret County Board of Commissioners. As of March 2015, Wildwood was represented on the Board by Terry Frank, whose term was due to expire in November 2016. District 3 also includes part of Morehead City as well as Broad Creek.
