= Jug Thesenga =

American baseball player (1914–2002)

- Pitcher
- Born: April 27, 1914; Jefferson, South Dakota, U.S.
- Died: December 3, 2002 (aged 88); Wichita, Kansas, U.S.
- Batted: Right Threw: Right

MLB debut
- September 1, 1944, for the Washington Senators

Last MLB appearance
- September 25, 1944, for the Washington Senators

MLB statistics
- Win–loss record: 0–0
- Strikeouts: 2
- Earned run average: 5.11
- Stats at Baseball Reference

Teams
- Washington Senators (1944)

Arnold Joseph "Jug" Thesenga (April 27, 1914 – December 3, 2002) was an American Major League Baseball pitcher who appeared in five games for the Washington Senators in 1944.

== Sources ==
- Career statistics from Baseball Reference · Baseball Reference (Minors) · Retrosheet · Baseball Almanac
