= Doubleheader (baseball) =

Two baseball games between the same two teams on the same day

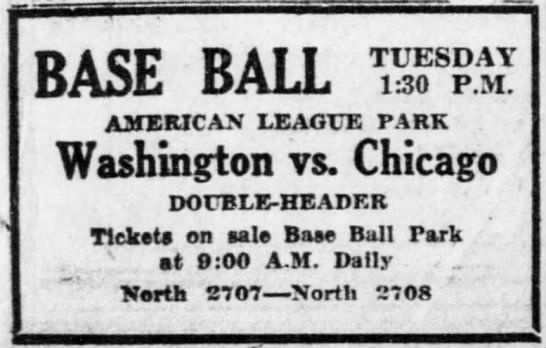
Advertisement for a baseball doubleheader played on July 28, 1925. The Chicago White Sox defeated the Washington Senators in both games.

In the sport of baseball, a doubleheader is a set of two games played between the same two teams on the same day. Historically, doubleheaders have been played in immediate succession, in front of the same crowd. Contemporarily, the term is also used to refer to two games played between two teams in a single day in front of different crowds and not in immediate succession.

The record for the most doubleheaders played by a major-league team in one season is 44 by the 1943 Chicago White Sox. The 1928 Boston Braves played nine consecutive doubleheaders during the final month of their season, totaling 18 games in 12 days.

== History ==
For many decades, major-league doubleheaders were routinely scheduled numerous times each season. However, any major-league doubleheader now played is generally the result of a prior game between the same two teams being postponed due to inclement weather or other factors. Most often the game is rescheduled for a day on which the two teams play each other again. Often it is within the same series, but in some cases, may be weeks or months after the original date. On rare occasions, the last game between two teams in that particular city is rained out, and a doubleheader may be scheduled at the other team's home park to replace the missed game.

Currently, major-league teams playing two games in a day usually play a "day-night doubleheader", in which the stadium is emptied of spectators and a separate admission is required for the second game. However, such games are officially regarded as separate games on the same date, rather than as a doubleheader. True doubleheaders are less commonly played. Classic doubleheaders, also known as day doubleheaders, were more common in the past, and although they are rare in the major leagues, they still are played at the minor league and college levels.

In 1959, at least one league played a quarter of its games as classic doubleheaders. The rate declined to 10% in 1979. Eventually, eight years passed between two officially scheduled doubleheaders. Reasons for the decline include clubs' desire to maximize revenue, longer duration of games, five-day pitching rotation as opposed to four-day rotation, time management of relievers and catchers, and lack of consensus among players.

== Types of doubleheaders ==
The Official Baseball Rules used by Major League Baseball (MLB) discuss doubleheaders in section 4.08. The document makes mention of "conventional" and "split" doubleheaders.

=== Conventional ===
In conventional doubleheaders, a spectator may attend both games by purchasing a single ticket. After the first game ends, a break, normally lasting 30 to 45 minutes per the Official Baseball Rules, occurs and the second game is then started. For statistical purposes, the attendance is counted only for the second game, with the first game's attendance recorded as zero.

==== Day ====
The "classic" day doubleheader consists of the first game played in the early afternoon and, following a break, the second is played in the late afternoon. This was often done out of necessity in the years before many ballparks had lights. Often, if either game went into extra innings, the second game was eventually called when it grew dark.

This type of doubleheader is now more prominent in Minor League Baseball. It is now uncommon in the major leagues, even for rain makeups, since the use of stadium lights allows for night games. They are still occasionally scheduled, one example being the Tampa Bay Rays hosting the Oakland Athletics in a single-admission doubleheader starting at 1:05 p.m. on the afternoon of June 10, 2017, at Tropicana Field.

==== Twi-night ====
In a twi-night (short for "twilight-night") doubleheader, the first game is played in the late afternoon and, following a break, the second begins at night. Under the Collective Bargaining Agreement (CBA) between MLB and the Major League Baseball Players Association (MLBPA), this is allowed provided the start time of the first game is no later than 5:00 p.m. local time, although they generally start at 4:00 p.m. This type of doubleheader is still used in the minor leagues, or occasionally in MLB as the result of a rainout.

=== Split ===
In a split or "day-night" doubleheader, the first game is played in the early afternoon and the second is played at night. In this scenario, separate tickets are sold for admission to each individual game. Such doubleheaders are favored by major-league organizations because they can charge admission for each game individually, and most often occur as the result of a rainout, where tickets have already been sold to the individual games.

Except in special circumstances with the approval of the MLBPA, such as a makeup game resulting from a rainout, scheduling split doubleheaders is prohibited under the terms of the 2002 CBA. Exceptions have occurred; for example, on August 22, 2012, the Arizona Diamondbacks hosted the Miami Marlins in a day-night doubleheader, the first doubleheader ever played at Chase Field, which was arranged due to a scheduling error violating another section of the CBA, which prohibits teams from being scheduled to play on more than 20 consecutive days.

Since the 2012 season, the CBA has allowed teams to expand their active roster by one player (currently from 26 to 27 players) for split doubleheaders, as long as those doubleheaders were scheduled with at least 48 hours' notice.

== Tripleheaders ==
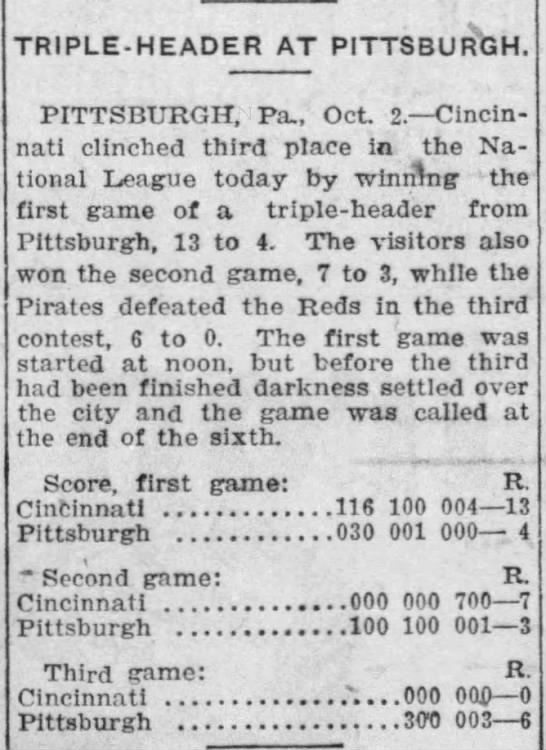
Newspaper account in the Austin American-Statesman of the tripleheader played on October 2, 1920

Three instances of a tripleheader are recorded in MLB, indicating three games between the same two teams on the same day. These occurred between the Brooklyn Bridegrooms and Pittsburgh Innocents on September 1, 1890 (Brooklyn won all three); between the Baltimore Orioles and Louisville Colonels on September 7, 1896 (Baltimore won all three); and between the Pittsburgh Pirates and Cincinnati Reds on October 2, 1920 (Cincinnati won the first two of the three, before losing the third in six innings in a darkness-shortened game).

Tripleheaders are prohibited under the current CBA, except if the first game is the conclusion of a game suspended from a prior date: this could only happen if the only remaining dates between the two teams were scheduled doubleheaders, with no single games left for the suspended game to precede.

This scenario played out after a game between the Philadelphia Phillies and New York Giants played in Philadelphia on August 30, 1913, was ordered to be resumed by the NL board of directors (thus, it became a suspended game). (Note: The game had originally been ruled a forfeit to the Giants, which was protested by the Phillies, and the league president's decision (which was to award the game to the Phillies) was protested by the Giants. For further information, see the entries for August 30, 1913, at Protested game#Upheld protests in MLB.) The only games left between the Phillies and Giants was a six-game set at the end of the season, scheduled to be played across three consecutive days of doubleheaders in New York. Thus, the suspended game was resumed on October 2, 1913, before the first of the three scheduled doubleheaders. Upon resuming the suspended game, the Phillies recorded the last two outs as the "home" team. In the scheduled doubleheader, the Giants won the first game and the Phillies won the second game, which was shorted by darkness to six innings. To date, this is the only time the scenario of a suspended game being completed before a scheduled doubleheader has occurred.

Such a scenario nearly happened near the end of the 2019 season, when a Friday doubleheader between the Detroit Tigers and Chicago White Sox was rained out after the first game started but was called off with the Tigers leading, 4–2, in the bottom of the fourth inning. As a result, one of the games was made up as part of a doubleheader on Saturday while the other was canceled entirely, as it had no bearing on the postseason. Had the broader use of suspended games added by MLB in 2020 been in place during 2019, or if the game had been tied after completing five or more innings, it is possible that parts of three games could have been played on Saturday, beginning with the conclusion of the suspended game.

== Seven-inning doubleheaders ==
Under some rulesets, games played as part of a doubleheader last seven innings each instead of the usual nine.

=== In college and minor league baseball ===
College and minor league baseball typically use seven-inning doubleheaders. This applies even in the postseason; in 2024, the Carolina League championship was decided in a doubleheader. Following a rainout the previous night, the final two games of the best-of-three series between Kannapolis and Fredericksburg were played as a doubleheader (if necessary), with Kannapolis winning the first game (which lasted seven innings), forcing the second game to be played. In another seven-inning contest, Fredericksburg won the game and the league championship.

In the minors, if the first game is the completion of a suspended game from a prior day, the suspended game is played to completion (seven or nine innings, whichever it was scheduled to be when it started), and the second game of the doubleheader is seven innings.

In leagues which place a runner on second base at the start of extra innings, the rule applies starting in the eighth inning.

=== In Major League Baseball, 2020–2021 ===
After the COVID-19 pandemic delayed the start of MLB's 2020 season to July from its original intended start in March, the league announced on July 31 that all doubleheader games would be scheduled for seven innings each during the shortened season, to reduce strain on teams' pitchers. The league and the MLBPA came to an agreement to put this rule in place only for the 2020 season, later extended to the 2021 season as well. The 2022 season reverted to nine-inning doubleheaders.

The first major-league seven-inning doubleheader was played on August 2, 2020, between the Cincinnati Reds and the Detroit Tigers at Comerica Park, with the Reds winning both games.

==== Statistical impact ====
Some major-league feats in a seven-inning game were counted as-is, while others were not. For example, a shutout was credited when it occurred in a seven-inning game; Reds pitcher Trevor Bauer threw the first seven-inning shutout under the rule.

A no-hitter was only credited if the game lasted at least nine innings (i.e. extra innings were played, due to a tie score). Under the 1991 guidelines recognizing major-league no-hitters, the feat is only officially recognized when a team's pitcher (or pitchers) allows no hits in a minimum of nine innings (that is, records at least 27 outs without allowing a hit). On April 25, 2021, Madison Bumgarner of the Arizona Diamondbacks pitched a complete seven-inning game allowing no hits to the Atlanta Braves in the second game of a doubleheader, but did not receive credit for a no-hitter. Five pitchers of the Tampa Bay Rays held the Cleveland Indians hitless in a seven-inning game, the second game of a doubleheader on July 7, 2021, and also did not receive credit for a no-hitter.

== Doubleheaders of note ==
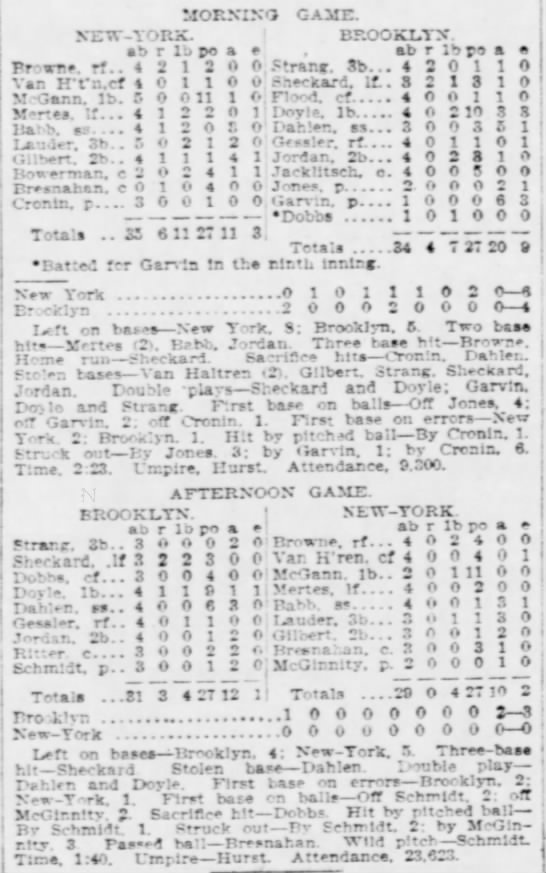
Boxscore of the home-and-home doubleheader contest on September 7, 1903, as published in the New-York Tribune

The home-and-home doubleheader, in which each team hosts one game, is extremely rare, as it requires the teams' home ballparks to be in close geographical proximity. During the 20th century and before the advent of interleague play in 1997, only one instance was recorded in Major League Baseball: a Labor Day special event involving the New York Giants and Brooklyn Superbas.

- September 7, 1903
  - Game 1: Washington Park (II): Giants 6, Superbas 4
  - Game 2: Polo Grounds (III): Superbas 3, Giants 0

This is the only home-and-home doubleheader known to have been part of the original major league season schedule.

Since interleague play began, the New York Mets and the New York Yankees have on three occasions played home-and-home doubleheaders. Each occasion was due to a rainout during the first series of the season. During the second series of the season, a makeup game was scheduled at the ballpark of the opposing team as part of a day-night doubleheader.

- July 8, 2000
  - Game 1: Shea Stadium: Yankees 4, Mets 2
  - Game 2: Yankee Stadium (I): Yankees 4, Mets 2 (June 11 makeup)
- June 28, 2003
  - Game 1: Yankee Stadium (I): Yankees 7, Mets 1
  - Game 2: Shea Stadium: Yankees 9, Mets 8 (June 21 makeup)
- June 27, 2008
  - Game 1: Yankee Stadium (I): Mets 15, Yankees 6 (May 16 makeup)
  - Game 2: Shea Stadium: Yankees 9, Mets 0

On occasion, teams can play different opponents in a doubleheader—that is, one team hosts two other teams on the same day. On September 13, 1951, the St. Louis Cardinals hosted a doubleheader against two different teams. The first game was a 6–4 win against the New York Giants. The second game resulted in a 2–0 loss to the Boston Braves. On September 25, 2000, the Cleveland Indians also hosted a doubleheader against two different teams. The September 10 game against the Chicago White Sox in Cleveland had been rained out. With no common days off for the remainder of the season and both teams in a postseason race, the teams agreed to play a day game in Cleveland on the same day that the Indians were to host the Minnesota Twins for a night game. The Indians defeated the White Sox, 9–2, in the first game, while the Twins defeated the Indians, 4–3, in the second.

On occasion, teams may play both games of a doubleheader at the same park, but one team is designated home for each game. This is usually the result of earlier postponements. For example, in 2007, when snow storms in northern Ohio caused the Cleveland Indians to postpone an entire four-game series from April 5–8 against the Seattle Mariners; three of the games were made up in Cleveland throughout the season, while the fourth was made up as part of a doubleheader in Seattle on September 26 with the Indians as the designated home team for the first game. The Indians won the first game acting as the home team, 12–4, but lost the second as the away team, 3–2. Such an occurrence is typical when two teams lack a mutual off day to make a game up in the same ballpark, but have a series at the visiting team's ballpark that it can be made up during. This can also happen if the game is between an East/Central team and West team to prevent a team from having to travel across the country to make up a game. Due to MLB rules, both games are considered home games for the team whose stadium the games are played at. In 2020, due to COVID-19 causing postponements of multiple games, multiple games were made up this way.

== In popular culture ==
National Baseball Hall of Fame inductee Ernie Banks, who spent his entire MLB career with the Chicago Cubs, was known for his catchphrase, "It's a beautiful day for a ballgame ... Let's play two!", expressing his wish to play a doubleheader every day out of his love of baseball.
