= Fred Vaughn =

American baseball player (1918–1964)

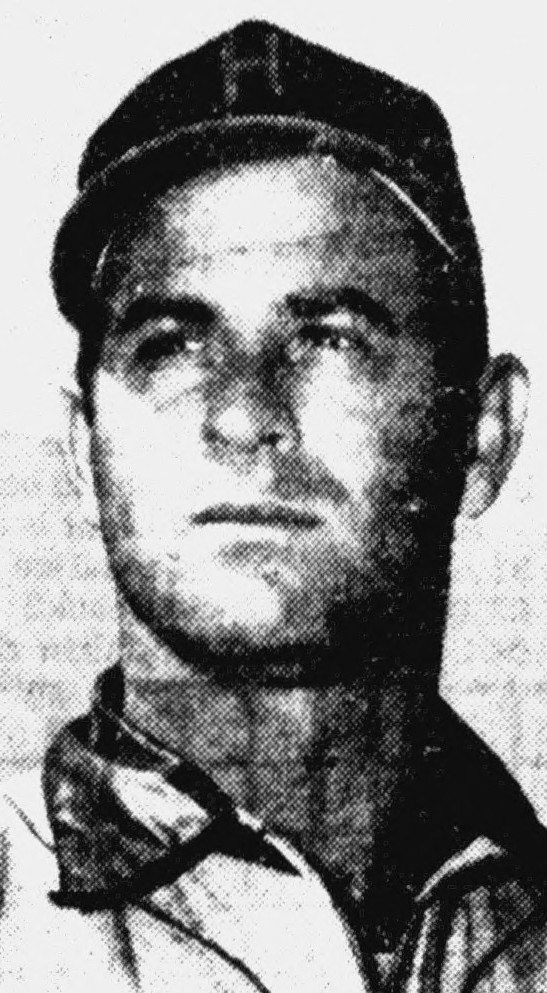
- Vaughn, circa 1948
- Second baseman
- Born: October 18, 1918; Coalinga, California, U.S.
- Died: March 2, 1964 (aged 45); Lake Wales, Florida, U.S.
- Batted: Right Threw: Right

MLB debut
- August 20, 1944, for the Washington Senators

Last MLB appearance
- September 20, 1945, for the Washington Senators

MLB statistics
- Batting average: .241
- Home runs: 2
- Runs batted in: 46
- Stats at Baseball Reference

Teams
- Washington Senators (1944–1945)

Fredric Thomas "Fred" Vaughn (October 18, 1918 – March 2, 1964), nicknamed "Muscles", was an American professional baseball player. He was a second baseman over parts of two seasons (1944–45) with the Washington Senators. For his career, he compiled a .241 batting average in 377 at-bats, with two home runs and 46 runs batted in. He was an infielder for the Chicago White Sox in spring 1946, when he retired from professional baseball. In California he played for the Hollywood Stars baseball club in 1948.

== Personal life ==
Vaughn was born in Coalinga, California, the son of oil executive Thomas Tilden Vaughn and Hassie Geneva Poston Vaughn. He attended Santa Paula High School, and married Julia Marcia Blood in 1940, and had a daughter, Marcia. He died in an auto accident in Lake Wales, Florida, in 1964, at the age of 45.
