= William Metzig =

American baseball player (1918–2006)

- Second baseman
- Born: December 4, 1918; Fort Dodge, Iowa, U.S.
- Died: March 12, 2006 (aged 87); Lubbock, Texas, U.S.
- Batted: Right Threw: Right

MLB debut
- September 19, 1944, for the Chicago White Sox

Last MLB appearance
- October 1, 1944, for the Chicago White Sox

MLB statistics
- Games played: 5
- Batting average: .125
- Runs batted in: 1
- Stats at Baseball Reference

Teams
- Chicago White Sox (1944)

William Andrew Metzig (December 4, 1918 – March 12, 2006) was an American second baseman in Major League Baseball. He played for the Chicago White Sox.
