= Roy Valdés =

Cuban baseball player

- Pinch hitter
- Born: February 23, 1920; Havana, Cuba
- Died: December 3, 2005 (aged 85); Miami, Florida, U.S.
- Batted: Right Threw: Right

MLB debut
- May 3, 1944, for the Washington Senators

Last MLB appearance
- May 3, 1944, for the Washington Senators

MLB statistics
- Batting average: .000
- At bats: 1
- Stats at Baseball Reference

Teams
- Washington Senators (1944)

Rogelio Lazaro Valdés Rojas (February 23, 1920 – December 3, 2005) was a Cuban Major League Baseball player.

Born in Havana, Cuba, Valdés was one of many who only appeared in the major leagues during World War II. His career consisted of one at bat as a pinch hitter for the Washington Senators at Fenway Park in Boston on May 3, 1944. He went 0-for-1 for a batting average of .000. He did not appear in the field, so his playing position is unknown.

Between 1944 and 1949, Valdés played six seasons and 498 games in the minor leagues, playing exclusively as a catcher.

Valdés died in Miami, Florida, at the age of 85.
