= John McGillen =

American baseball player (1917-1987)

- Pitcher
- Born: August 6, 1917; Eddystone, Pennsylvania, U.S.
- Died: August 11, 1987 (aged 70); Upland, Pennsylvania, U.S.
- Batted: Right Threw: Left

MLB debut
- April 20, 1944, for the Philadelphia Athletics

Last MLB appearance
- April 29, 1944, for the Philadelphia Athletics

MLB statistics
- Win–loss record: 0–0
- Earned run average: 18.00
- Strikeouts: 0
- Stats at Baseball Reference

Teams
- Philadelphia Athletics (1944)

John Joseph McGillen (August 6, 1917 – August 11, 1987) was an American professional baseball pitcher. He appeared in two games in Major League Baseball for the Philadelphia Athletics during the 1944 season.
