= Grey Clarke =

American baseball player (1912–1993)

- Third baseman
- Born: September 26, 1912; Fulton, Alabama, U.S.
- Died: November 23, 1993 (aged 81); Kannapolis, North Carolina, U.S.
- Batted: Right Threw: Right

MLB debut
- April 19, 1944, for the Chicago White Sox

Last MLB appearance
- October 1, 1944, for the Chicago White Sox

MLB statistics
- Batting average: .260
- Home runs: 0
- Runs batted in: 27
- Stats at Baseball Reference

Teams
- Chicago White Sox (1944)

Richard Grey Clarke (September 26, 1912 – November 23, 1993), nicknamed "Noisy", was an American professional baseball third baseman in Major League Baseball. He played for the Chicago White Sox in 1944.
