= Lew Flick =

American baseball player (1915-1990)

- Outfielder
- Born: February 18, 1915; Bristol, Tennessee, US
- Died: December 7, 1990 (aged 75); Weber City, Virginia, US
- Batted: Left Threw: Left

MLB debut
- September 28, 1943, for the Philadelphia Athletics

Last MLB appearance
- July 1, 1944, for the Philadelphia Athletics

MLB statistics
- Batting average: .175
- Home runs: 0
- Runs batted in: 2
- Stats at Baseball Reference

Teams
- Philadelphia Athletics (1943–44)

Lewis Miller Flick (February 18, 1915 – December 7, 1990) was an American Major League Baseball outfielder and pinch hitter. He debuted late in the 1943 season, playing right field for the Philadelphia Athletics on September 28. His game was quite impressive, as he got three hits in five at bats (a .600 batting average) while scoring two runs. The following season, he played in 19 games, but the results were not quite so positive, as he managed just 4 hits in 35 at bats for an abysmal .114 average. He also had one stolen base, but did not have any extra base hits.

Both before and after his major league career, Flick put up big numbers in the minor leagues. He won three minor league batting titles, two in the Appalachian League before his major league stint, and one in the American Association in 1945. He also led his league in hits six different times. On July 21, 1946, he set a record for most consecutive hits in a single game, hitting safely nine straight times for the Little Rock Travelers of the Southern Association in a 19-inning contest. He grounded out in his final at bat, finishing the game 9-for-10.

== Sources ==
- Career statistics from Baseball Reference · Baseball Reference (Minors) · Retrosheet · Baseball Almanac
