= Bill Zinser =

American baseball player

- Pitcher
- Born: January 18, 1918; Queens, New York, U.S.
- Died: February 16, 1993 (aged 73); Englewood, Florida, U.S.
- Batted: Right Threw: Right

MLB debut
- August 19, 1944, for the Washington Senators

Last MLB appearance
- August 26, 1944, for the Washington Senators

MLB statistics
- Win–loss record: 0–0
- Earned run average: 27.00
- Strikeouts: 1
- Stats at Baseball Reference

Teams
- Washington Senators (1944)

William Francis Zinser (January 18, 1918 – February 16, 1993) was an American professional baseball pitcher. He appeared two Major League Baseball games for the Washington Senators in 1944. He was later a scout for the Brooklyn Dodgers.

Zinser had a very short major league career, lasting only two games in 1944. He is most known for scouting future Hall of Famer Sandy Koufax while he pitched for the University of Cincinnati in 1954. His scouting report, which said that Koufax had an incredible arm, was lost in the Dodgers' front office until several other teams had given Koufax a tryout.
