= Bill Dietrich =

American baseball player (1910–1978)

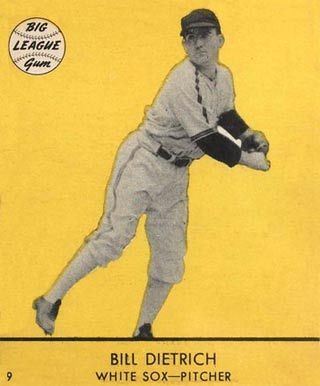
- Pitcher
- Born: March 29, 1910; Philadelphia, Pennsylvania, U.S.
- Died: June 20, 1978 (aged 68); Philadelphia, Pennsylvania, U.S.

MLB debut
- April 13, 1933, for the Philadelphia Athletics

Last MLB appearance
- June 5, 1948, for the Philadelphia Athletics

MLB statistics
- Win–loss record: 108–128
- Earned run average: 4.48
- Strikeouts: 660
- Stats at Baseball Reference

Teams
- Philadelphia Athletics (1933–1936); Washington Senators (1936); Chicago White Sox (1936–1946); Philadelphia Athletics (1947–1948)

Career highlights and awards
- Pitched a no-hitter on June 1, 1937

William John "Bullfrog" Dietrich (March 29, 1910 – June 20, 1978) was an American professional baseball pitcher. He played in Major League Baseball (MLB) from 1933 to 1948 for the Philadelphia Athletics, Washington Senators, and Chicago White Sox. His Pennsylvania-born parents of German ancestry were Charles, an accountant, and Berth (Hopes) Dietrich.

In 16 seasons, Dietrich posted a 108–128 career record. He recorded a winning mark in just three seasons yet was usually close to .500 every year. His best year in terms of wins was 1944, when he went 16–17 for the White Sox.

On June 1, 1937, while with the White Sox, Dietrich no-hit the St. Louis Browns 8–0 at Comiskey Park.

== Death ==
Dietrich died at his home in Philadelphia on June 20, 1978.

== Popular culture ==
In the film A Christmas Story, Mr. Parker says that "the Sox traded Bullfrog" for a player named "Schottenhoffen".

== See also ==
- List of Major League Baseball no-hitters
- List of bespectacled baseball players

Achievements
Preceded by Vern Kennedy	No-hitter pitcher June 1, 1937	Succeeded by Johnny Vander Meer
