= Tom Turner (catcher) =

American baseball player (1916–1986)

- Catcher
- Born: September 8, 1916; Custer, Oklahoma, US
- Died: May 14, 1986 (aged 69); Kennewick, Washington, US
- Batted: Right Threw: Right

MLB debut
- April 25, 1940, for the Chicago White Sox

Last MLB appearance
- September 8, 1944, for the St. Louis Browns

MLB statistics
- Batting average: .237
- Home runs: 7
- Runs batted in: 63
- Stats at Baseball Reference

Teams
- Chicago White Sox (1940–1944); St. Louis Browns (1944)

Thomas Richard Turner (September 8, 1916 – May 14, 1986) was an American professional baseball catcher in Major League Baseball who played with the Chicago White Sox and the St. Louis Browns from 1940 to 1944. Turner served in the United States Army during World War II in 1945.
