= Don Hanski =

American baseball player (1916–1957)

- First baseman
- Born: February 27, 1916; La Porte, Indiana, U.S.
- Died: September 2, 1957 (aged 41); Worth, Illinois, U.S.
- Batted: Left Threw: Left

MLB debut
- May 6, 1943, for the Chicago White Sox

Last MLB appearance
- May 13, 1944, for the Chicago White Sox

MLB statistics
- Games played: 11
- Batting average: .227
- Runs batted in: 2
- Stats at Baseball Reference

Teams
- Chicago White Sox (1943–1944)

Donald Thomas Hanski (February 27, 1916 – September 2, 1957) was an American professional baseball first baseman in Major League Baseball. He played for the Chicago White Sox. His birth name was Donald Thomas Hanyzewski. He used Hanski as his professional name but did not legally change it until 1954. His cousin was Ed Hanyzewski who played for the Chicago Cubs during the 1940s.

During 1943 and 1944, due to World War II travel restrictions, baseball teams were not allowed to travel to Arizona or California for spring training. Both the Sox and the Chicago Cubs held their spring training in French Lick, Indiana. The training was held at the French Lick Spring Hotel.
