= Des Peres Presbyterian Church =

Historic church in Missouri, United States

- U.S. National Register of Historic Places
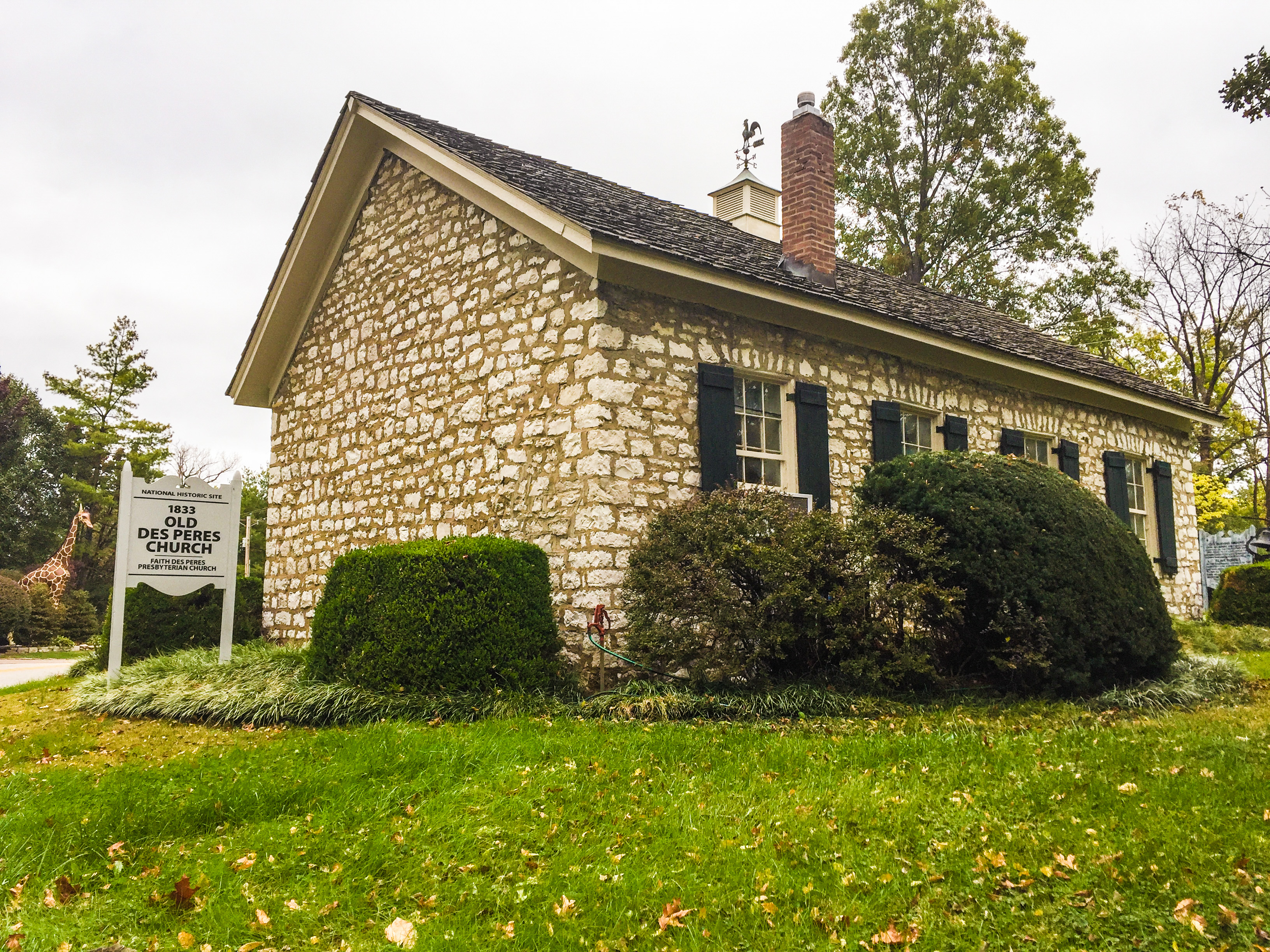
- Des Peres Presbyterian Church in 2017

- Location within Missouri Location within the United States
- Location: 2255 Geyer Rd., Frontenac, Missouri
- Coordinates: 38°37′22″N 90°25′12″W
- Area: 2 acres (0.81 ha)
- Built: 1834
- NRHP reference No.: 78003137
- Added to NRHP: April 14, 1978

Des Peres Presbyterian Church (Old Des Peres Church;Old Stone Church) is a historic church on 2255 Geyer Road in Frontenac, Missouri, United States.

It was started in 1834 and was added to the National Register in 1978.

Elijah Parish Lovejoy was an early pastor of the church while also serving as an editor of the abolitionist St. Louis Observer.
