= Jake Wade (baseball) =

American baseball player (1912–2006)

- Pitcher
- Born: April 1, 1912; Morehead City, North Carolina, U.S.
- Died: February 1, 2006 (aged 93); Wildwood, North Carolina, U.S.
- Batted: Left Threw: Left

MLB debut
- April 22, 1936, for the Detroit Tigers

Last MLB appearance
- September 13, 1946, for the Washington Senators

MLB statistics
- Win–loss record: 27–40
- Earned run average: 5.00
- Strikeouts: 291
- Stats at Baseball Reference

Teams
- Detroit Tigers (1936–1938); Boston Red Sox (1939); St. Louis Browns (1939); Chicago White Sox (1942–1944); New York Yankees (1946); Washington Senators (1946)

Jacob Fields Wade (April 1, 1912 – February 1, 2006) was an American professional baseball pitcher who appeared in Major League Baseball for the Detroit Tigers (1936–1938), Boston Red Sox (1939), St. Louis Browns (1939), Chicago White Sox (1942–1944), New York Yankees (1946) and Washington Senators (1946). Wade batted and threw left-handed and was listed as 6 feet 2 inches (1.88 m) tall and 175 pounds (79 kg). He was nicknamed "Whistlin' Jake".

== Early life ==
Jacob Fields Wade was born on April 1, 1912 in Morehead City, North Carolina to parents Jacob and Love Styron. Jacob Sr. was a whaler and shipbuilder. He is one of 11 kids.

Wade attended Charles S. Wallace High School in Morehead City where he played first base. He attended North Carolina State College. Along with Baseball, Wade had a talent for whistling, being able to whistle birdcalls.

== Career ==
Wade made his major league debut with the Detroit Tigers in 1936 as he went 4–5. His most productive season came in 1937, when he posted career highs in wins (7), starts (25), complete games (7), strikeouts (69) and innings pitched (165-1/3).

The next two years, Wade divided his playing time with Detroit and the Montreal Royals of the International League. Before the 1939 season he was traded by Detroit to the Boston Red Sox in the same deal that brought Pinky Higgins to the Tigers. He finished the season with the St. Louis Browns. Then joined the Toledo Mud Hens of the American Association in 1940, and played for the Indianapolis Indians (AA) the following year. In 1942 he returned to the majors with the Chicago White Sox. After serving in the military, he played his last major league season with the New York Yankees and Washington Senators in 1946.

In an eight-season major-league career, Wade posted a 27–30 record with 291 strikeouts and a 5.00 ERA in 668-1/3 innings.

Wade joined the Jersey City Giants of the International League in 1947, as he posted a 17–5 record with a 2.51 ERA helping his team to the league championship. He ended his professional baseball career with a 7–6 and a 4.96 ERA for the Buffalo Bisons (IL) in 1950. Following his playing career, he worked as an electronics repair technician at Cherry Point Marine Corps Air Station until his retirement in 1976.

Wade died in Wildwood, North Carolina, at age 93. At the time of his death, he was the oldest living former player of the Chicago White Sox. His younger brother, Ben Wade, was also a major league pitcher. The municipal ballpark in Morehead City, North Carolina is named "Wade Brothers Field" after Wade, his younger brother Ben, and an older brother, Winfield ("Wink") who played minor league baseball.

== See also ==
- Chicago White Sox all-time roster
- 1937 Detroit Tigers season
