= Gordon Maltzberger =

American baseball player (1912–1974)

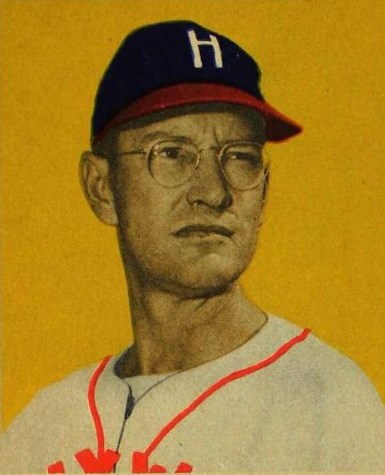
- Pitcher
- Born: September 4, 1912; Utopia, Texas, U.S.
- Died: December 11, 1974 (aged 62); Rialto, California, U.S.
- Batted: Right Threw: Right

MLB debut
- April 27, 1943, for the Chicago White Sox

Last MLB appearance
- September 17, 1947, for the Chicago White Sox

MLB statistics
- Win–loss record: 20–13
- Earned run average: 2.70
- Strikeouts: 136
- Stats at Baseball Reference

Teams
- Chicago White Sox (1943–1944, 1946–1947)

Gordon Ralph Maltzberger (September 4, 1912 – December 11, 1974) was an American professional baseball player. The native of Utopia, Texas, was a right-handed relief pitcher over parts of four seasons (1943–1944 and 1946–47) with the Chicago White Sox of Major League Baseball, and led the American League in saves (14) and (12) over his first two MLB seasons.

Maltzberger was listed as 6 feet (1.8 m) tall and 170 pounds (77 kg). He spent much of his minor-league pitching career in the top-level Pacific Coast League. After brief stints with the 1932 Los Angeles Angels and 1934 Hollywood Stars, he put in seven full seasons from 1936–1942 in other, lower-classification leagues before making the White Sox in 1943 during the midst of the World War II manpower shortage. At the time, Maltzberger was one of the few baseball players who wore glasses and may not have had a big-league trial if it were not for the fact many players had joined the military in support of the war. He would also serve in the United States Army in 1945, missing that season.

For his MLB career, he compiled a 20–13 record in 135 appearances, all in relief, with 33 career saves (not yet an official statistic) and a 2.70 earned run average. In 2931/3 innings pitched, he allowed 258 hits and 74 bases on balls, with 136 strikeouts.

Maltzberger returned to the minors in 1948 and enjoyed six successful seasons with the Hollywood Stars. He then managed in the Pittsburgh Pirates, Milwaukee Braves and White Sox farm systems and served as the pitching coach of the Minnesota Twins for three seasons.

He died in Rialto, California, at the age of 62. He was buried at the Hermosa Memorial Cemetery in Colton, California.

== See also ==
- List of Major League Baseball annual saves leaders

Sporting positions
Preceded by Eddie Lopat	Minnesota Twins pitching coach 1962–1964	Succeeded by Johnny Sain
