= Baby Ortiz =

Cuban baseball player (1919-1984)

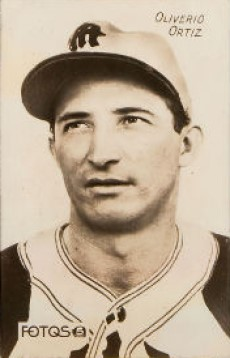
- Pitcher
- Born: December 5, 1919; Camagüey, Cuba
- Died: March 27, 1984 (aged 64); Central Senado, Cuba
- Batted: Right Threw: Right

MLB debut
- September 23, 1944, for the Washington Senators

Last MLB appearance
- September 27, 1944, for the Washington Senators

MLB statistics
- Win–loss record: 0-2
- Earned run average: 6.23
- Strikeouts: 4
- Stats at Baseball Reference

Teams
- Washington Senators (1944)

Oliverio "Baby" Ortiz (December 5, 1919 – March 27, 1984) was a Cuban-born Major League Baseball pitcher who played for the Washington Senators in 1944. He played parts of nine seasons in the minor leagues from 1944 to 1955, playing for sixteen teams.
