= 1946 Chicago White Sox season =

1946 Chicago White Sox
- League: American League
- Ballpark: Comiskey Park
- City: Chicago
- Owners: Grace Comiskey
- General managers: Leslie O'Connor
- Managers: Jimmy Dykes and Ted Lyons
- Radio: WJJD/WIND (AM) (Bob Elson)

The 1946 Chicago White Sox season was the White Sox's 46th season in the major leagues, and their 47th season overall. They finished with a record of 74–80, good enough for fifth place in the American League, 30 games behind the first place Boston Red Sox.

== Offseason ==
- December 8, 1945: Tony Cuccinello was released by the White Sox.

== Regular season ==
=== Season standings ===
American League
Team	W	L	Pct.	GB	Home	Road
Boston Red Sox	104	50	.675	—	61‍–‍16	43‍–‍34
Detroit Tigers	92	62	.597	12	48‍–‍30	44‍–‍32
New York Yankees	87	67	.565	17	47‍–‍30	40‍–‍37
Washington Senators	76	78	.494	28	38‍–‍38	38‍–‍40
Chicago White Sox	74	80	.481	30	40‍–‍38	34‍–‍42
Cleveland Indians	68	86	.442	36	36‍–‍41	32‍–‍45
St. Louis Browns	66	88	.429	38	35‍–‍41	31‍–‍47
Philadelphia Athletics	49	105	.318	55	31‍–‍46	18‍–‍59

=== Record vs. opponents ===
1946 American League record Sources:
Team	BOS	CWS	CLE	DET	NYY	PHA	SLB	WSH
Boston	—	13–9	15–7	15–7–1	14–8	17–5	14–8–1	16–6
Chicago	9–13	—	13–9–1	10–12	8–14	12–10	12–10	10–12
Cleveland	7–15	9–13–1	—	5–17	10–12	15–7	15–7–1	7–15
Detroit	7–15–1	12–10	17–5	—	13–9	17–5	14–8	12–10
New York	8–14	14–8	12–10	9–13	—	16–6	14–8	14–8
Philadelphia	5–17	10–12	7–15	5–17	6–16	—	10–12	6–16–1
St. Louis	8–14–1	10–12	7–15–1	8–14	8–14	12–10	—	13–9
Washington	6–16	12–10	15–7	10–12	8–14	16–6–1	9–13	—

=== Opening Day lineup ===
- Wally Moses, RF
- Floyd Baker, 3B
- Taffy Wright, LF
- Luke Appling, SS
- Hal Trosky, 1B
- Don Kolloway, 2B
- Thurman Tucker, CF
- Mike Tresh, C
- Bill Dietrich, P

=== Notable transactions ===
- July 4, 1946: Tom Jordan was traded by the White Sox to the Cleveland Indians for a player to be named later. The Indians completed the deal by sending Frankie Hayes to the White Sox on July 15, 1946.
- July 23, 1946: Wally Moses was purchased from the White Sox by the Boston Red Sox.

=== Roster ===
1946 Chicago White Sox
Roster
Pitchers: 46 Earl Caldwell; 18 Bill Dietrich; 45 Orval Grove; 8,26 Ralph Hamner; 35 Joe Haynes; 59 Al Hollingsworth; 27 Thornton Lee; 48 Ed Lopat; 16 Ted Lyons; 38 Gordon Maltzberger; 38 Emmett O'Neill; 17 Frank Papish; 34 Len Perme; 29 Johnny Rigney; 49 Eddie Smith	Catchers: 19 George Dickey; 25 Ed Fernandes; 26 Frankie Hayes; 26 Tom Jordan; 15 Mike Tresh; Infielders: 4 Luke Appling; 8 Floyd Baker; 3 Jake Jones; 47 Don Kolloway; 14 Joe Kuhel; 39 Dario Lodigiani; 28 Cass Michaels; 7 Hal Trosky; 37 Leo Wells; 34 Frank Whitman	Outfielders: 12 Guy Curtright; 24 Ralph Hodgin; 36 Bob Kennedy; 9 Wally Moses; 38 Dave Philley; 23,5 Whitey Platt; -- Joe Smaza; 2 Thurman Tucker; 6 Taffy Wright	Manager: 5 Jimmy Dykes; 16 Ted Lyons; Coaches: 23 Red Faber; 22 Mule Haas; 33 Bing Miller

== Player stats ==
=== Batting ===
Note: G = Games played; AB = At bats; R = Runs scored; H = Hits; 2B = Doubles; 3B = Triples; HR = Home runs; RBI = Runs batted in; BB = Base on balls; SO = Strikeouts; AVG = Batting average; SB = Stolen bases

Player	G	AB	R	H	2B	3B	HR	RBI	BB	SO	AVG	SB
Luke Appling, SS	149	582	59	180	27	5	1	55	71	41	.309	6
Floyd Baker, 3B	9	24	2	6	1	0	0	3	2	3	.250	0
Guy Curtright, OF	23	55	7	11	2	0	0	5	11	14	.200	0
George Dickey, C	37	78	8	15	1	0	0	1	12	13	.192	0
Ed Fernandes, C	14	32	4	8	2	0	0	4	8	7	.250	0
Frankie Hayes, C	53	179	15	38	6	0	2	16	29	33	.212	1
Ralph Hodgin, LF, RF	87	258	32	65	10	1	0	25	19	6	.252	0
Bob Kennedy, LF, 3B, RF, CF	113	411	43	106	13	5	5	34	24	42	.258	6
Don Kolloway, 2B, 3B	123	482	45	135	23	4	3	53	9	29	.280	14
Jake Jones, 1B	24	79	10	21	5	1	3	13	2	13	.266	0
Tom Jordan, C	10	15	1	4	2	1	0	0	0	1	.267	0
Joe Kuhel, 1B	64	238	24	65	9	3	4	20	21	24	.273	4
Dario Lodigiani, 3B	44	155	12	38	8	0	0	13	16	14	.245	4
Cass Michaels, 2B, 3B, SS	91	291	37	75	8	0	1	22	29	36	.258	9
Wally Moses, RF, CF	56	168	20	46	9	1	4	16	17	20	.274	2
Dave Philley, LF	17	68	10	24	2	3	0	17	4	4	.353	5
Whitey Platt, OF	84	247	28	62	8	5	3	32	17	34	.251	1
Joe Smaza, RF	2	5	2	1	0	0	0	0	0	0	.200	0
Mike Tresh, C	80	217	28	47	5	2	0	21	36	24	.217	0
Hal Trosky, 1B	88	299	22	76	12	3	2	31	34	37	.254	4
Thurman Tucker, CF	121	438	62	126	20	3	1	36	54	45	.288	9
Leo Wells, 3B	45	127	11	24	4	1	1	11	12	34	.189	3
Frank Whitman, SS, 1B, 2B	17	16	7	1	0	0	0	1	2	6	.063	0
Taffy Wright, RF, LF	115	422	46	116	19	4	7	52	42	17	.275	10

Player	G	AB	R	H	2B	3B	HR	RBI	BB	SO	AVG	SB
Earl Caldwell, P	39	18	2	3	0	0	0	2	5	4	.167	0
Bill Dietrich, P	11	19	0	1	0	0	0	0	0	14	.053	0
Orval Grove, P	33	65	2	7	0	1	0	2	5	27	.108	0
Ralph Hamner, P	25	18	1	3	1	0	0	2	1	7	.167	0
Joe Haynes, P	32	57	4	14	4	0	0	6	1	10	.246	0
Al Hollingsworth, P	21	12	1	0	0	0	0	0	1	3	.000	0
Thornton Lee, P	7	15	0	4	0	0	0	3	0	4	.267	0
Eddie Lopat, P	30	87	10	22	2	1	0	10	8	7	.253	0
Ted Lyons, P	5	14	0	0	0	0	0	0	1	3	.000	0
Gordon Maltzberger, P	19	6	0	0	0	0	0	0	2	3	.000	0
Emmett O'Neill, P	2	1	0	0	0	0	0	0	0	0	.000	0
Frank Papish, P	31	43	3	8	1	0	0	2	1	7	.186	0
Johnny Rigney, P	15	26	2	4	1	0	0	4	0	7	.154	0
Eddie Smith, P	24	45	2	8	1	0	0	3	3	9	.178	0
Team totals	155	5312	562	1364	206	44	37	515	499	602	.257	78

=== Pitching ===
Note: W = Wins; L = Losses; ERA = Earned run average; G = Games pitched; GS = Games started; SV = Saves; IP = Innings pitched; H = Hits allowed; R = Runs allowed; ER = Earned runs allowed; HR = Home runs allowed; BB = Walks allowed; K = Strikeouts

Player	W	L	ERA	G	GS	SV	IP	H	R	ER	HR	BB	K
Earl Caldwell	13	4	2.08	39	0	8	90.2	60	28	21	2	29	42
Bill Dietrich	3	3	2.61	11	9	1	62.0	63	21	18	4	24	20
Orval Grove	8	13	3.02	33	26	0	205.1	213	96	69	10	78	60
Ralph Hamner	2	7	4.42	25	7	1	71.1	80	47	35	2	39	29
Joe Haynes	7	9	3.76	32	23	2	177.1	203	80	74	14	60	60
Al Hollingsworth	3	2	4.58	21	2	1	55.0	63	29	28	2	22	22
Gordon Maltzberger	2	0	1.59	19	0	2	39.2	30	7	7	3	6	17
Thornton Lee	2	4	3.53	7	7	0	43.1	39	24	17	1	23	23
Eddie Lopat	13	13	2.73	29	29	0	231.0	216	80	70	18	48	89
Ted Lyons	1	4	2.32	5	5	0	42.2	38	17	11	2	9	10
Emmett O'Neill	0	0	0.00	2	0	0	3.2	4	2	0	0	5	0
Frank Papish	7	5	2.74	31	15	0	138.0	122	52	42	7	63	66
Len Perme	0	0	8.31	4	0	0	4.1	6	4	4	0	7	2
Johnny Rigney	5	5	4.03	15	11	0	82.2	76	37	37	6	35	51
Eddie Smith	8	11	2.85	24	21	1	145.1	135	71	46	9	60	59
Team totals	74	80	3.10	155	155	16	1392.1	1348	595	479	80	508	550

== Farm system ==
Level	Team	League	Manager
AAA	Milwaukee Brewers	American Association	Nick Cullop
AA	Little Rock Travelers	Southern Association	Willis Hudlin
AA	Shreveport Sports	Texas League	Salty Parker and Hub Northen
A	Greenville Spinners	Sally League	Ivy Griffin
B	Waterloo White Hawks	Illinois–Indiana–Iowa League	Johnny Mostil
C	Texarkana Bears	East Texas League	Gabby Lusk and Joe Kracher
C	Superior Blues	Northern League	Fred Hensley and George Treadwell
D	Brewton Millers	Alabama State League	Ben Catchings
D	New River Rebels	Appalachian League	Jack Crosswhite
D	Alexandria Aces	Evangeline League	Carl Kott
D	Cordele White Sox	Georgia–Florida League	Joe Holden
D	Madisonville Miners	KITTY League	Frank Zubik
D	Lima Terriers	Ohio State League	Charles Moore
D	Wisconsin Rapids White Sox	Wisconsin State League	Charlie Engle

LEAGUE CHAMPIONS: New River
