= 1947 Chicago White Sox season =

1947 Chicago White Sox
- League: American League
- Ballpark: Comiskey Park
- City: Chicago
- Owners: Grace Comiskey
- General managers: Leslie O'Connor
- Managers: Ted Lyons
- Radio: WJJD/WIND (AM) (Bob Elson)

The 1947 Chicago White Sox season was the White Sox's 47th season in the major leagues, and their 48th season overall. They finished with a record of 70–84, good enough for sixth place in the American League, 27 games behind the first place New York Yankees.

== Offseason ==
- February 13, 1947: Frankie Hayes was released by the White Sox.
- Prior to 1947 season: Tod Davis was acquired by the White Sox from the Hollywood Stars as part of a minor league working agreement.

== Regular season ==
- July 5: In a game against the White Sox, Larry Doby of the Cleveland Indians became the first black player to appear in an American League game. Doby appeared in the seventh inning and struck out.

=== Season standings ===
American League
Team	W	L	Pct.	GB	Home	Road
New York Yankees	97	57	.630	—	55‍–‍22	42‍–‍35
Detroit Tigers	85	69	.552	12	46‍–‍31	39‍–‍38
Boston Red Sox	83	71	.539	14	49‍–‍30	34‍–‍41
Cleveland Indians	80	74	.519	17	38‍–‍39	42‍–‍35
Philadelphia Athletics	78	76	.506	19	39‍–‍38	39‍–‍38
Chicago White Sox	70	84	.455	27	32‍–‍43	38‍–‍41
Washington Senators	64	90	.416	33	36‍–‍41	28‍–‍49
St. Louis Browns	59	95	.383	38	29‍–‍48	30‍–‍47

=== Record vs. opponents ===
1947 American League record Sources:
Team	BOS	CWS	CLE	DET	NYY	PHA	SLB	WSH
Boston	—	16–6–1	9–13	12–10–1	9–13	10–12–1	15–7	12–10
Chicago	6–16–1	—	11–11	7–15	10–12	11–11	11–11	14–8
Cleveland	13–9	11–11	—	8–14–2	7–15	11–11–1	17–5	13–9
Detroit	10–12–1	15–7	14–8–2	—	8–14–1	11–11	15–7	12–10
New York	13–9	12–10	15–7	14–8–1	—	13–9	15–7	15–7
Philadelphia	12–10–1	11–11	11–11–1	11–11	9–13	—	13–9	11–11
St. Louis	7–15	11–11	5–17	7–15	7–15	9–13	—	13–9
Washington	10–12	8–14	9–13	10–12	7–15	11–11	9–13	—

=== Opening Day lineup ===
Player	Position
Floyd Baker	3B
Luke Appling	SS
Dave Philley	CF
Bob Kennedy	RF
Ralph Hodgin	LF
Don Kolloway	1B
Cass Michaels	2B
Mike Tresh	C
Ed Lopat	P

=== Notable transactions ===
- April 23, 1947: Gus Zernial was purchased by the White Sox from the Cleveland Indians.
- July 1947: Pete Wojey was acquired by the White Sox from the Hot Springs Bathers.

=== Roster ===
1947 Chicago White Sox
Roster
Pitchers: -- Hi Bithorn; 46 Earl Caldwell; 28 Pete Gebrian; 36 Bob Gillespie; 45 Orval Grove; 25,49 Earl Harrist; 35 Joe Haynes; 27 Thornton Lee; 48 Ed Lopat; 37 Gordon Maltzberger; 17 Frank Papish; 29 Johnny Rigney; 34 Red Ruffing; 49,18 Eddie Smith	Catchers: 19 George Dickey; 26 Joe Stephenson; 15 Mike Tresh; Infielders: 4 Luke Appling; 8 Floyd Baker; 3 Jake Jones; 47 Don Kolloway; 28,7 Cass Michaels; 7,12 Jack Wallaesa; 3 Rudy York	Outfielders: 5,24 Loyd Christopher; 24,25 Ralph Hodgin; 5,36 Bob Kennedy; 38,9 Dave Philley; 2 Thurman Tucker; 6 Taffy Wright; Other batters: 14 Joe Kuhel	Manager: 16 Ted Lyons; Coaches: 23 Red Faber; 33 Bing Miller; 22 Buster Mills

== Player stats ==
=== Batting ===
Note: G = Games played; AB = At bats; R = Runs scored; H = Hits; 2B = Doubles; 3B = Triples; HR = Home runs; RBI = Runs batted in; BB = Base on balls; SO = Strikeouts; AVG = Batting average; SB = Stolen bases

Player	G	AB	R	H	2B	3B	HR	RBI	BB	SO	AVG	SB
Luke Appling, SS	139	503	67	154	29	0	8	49	64	28	.306	8
Floyd Baker, 3B	105	371	61	98	12	3	0	22	66	28	.264	9
Loyd Christopher, LF	7	23	1	5	0	1	0	0	2	4	.217	0
George Dickey, C	83	211	15	47	6	0	1	27	34	25	.223	4
Ralph Hodgin, LF	59	180	26	53	10	3	1	24	13	4	.294	1
Bob Kennedy, RF, LF	115	428	47	112	19	3	6	48	18	38	.262	3
Don Kolloway, 2B, 1B, 3B	124	485	49	135	25	4	2	35	17	34	.278	11
Jake Jones, 1B	45	171	15	41	7	1	3	20	13	25	.240	1
Joe Kuhel, PH	3	3	0	0	0	0	0	0	0	3	.000	0
Cass Michaels, 2B, 3B	110	355	31	97	15	4	3	34	39	28	.273	10
Dave Philley, CF, LF, 3B	143	551	55	142	25	11	2	45	35	39	.258	21
Joe Stephenson, C	16	35	3	5	0	0	0	3	1	7	.143	0
Mike Tresh, C	90	274	19	66	6	2	0	20	26	26	.241	2
Thurman Tucker, CF	89	254	28	60	9	4	1	17	38	25	.236	10
Jack Wallaesa, SS, LF	81	205	25	40	9	1	7	32	23	51	.195	2
Taffy Wright, RF, LF	124	401	48	130	13	0	4	54	48	17	.324	8
Rudy York, 1B	102	400	40	97	18	4	15	64	36	55	.243	1

Player	G	AB	R	H	2B	3B	HR	RBI	BB	SO	AVG	SB
Earl Caldwell, P	40	7	0	0	0	0	0	0	0	1	.000	0
Pete Gebrian, P	27	13	0	0	0	0	0	0	0	4	.000	0
Bob Gillespie, P	25	33	2	2	0	0	0	0	3	12	.061	0
Orval Grove, P	25	48	2	7	2	0	0	1	5	16	.146	0
Earl Harrist, P	33	24	1	5	0	0	0	1	0	8	.208	0
Joe Haynes, P	29	65	7	17	2	0	0	6	0	7	.262	0
Thornton Lee, P	21	29	0	6	0	0	0	1	2	11	.207	0
Eddie Lopat, P	35	96	5	19	3	0	0	11	4	6	.198	0
Gordon Maltzberger, P	33	7	2	1	1	0	0	0	2	4	.143	0
Frank Papish, P	38	58	1	5	0	0	0	2	1	15	.086	0
Johnny Rigney, P	11	14	0	0	0	0	0	0	0	3	.000	0
Red Ruffing, P	14	24	2	5	0	0	0	3	1	3	.208	0
Eddie Smith, P	15	6	1	1	0	0	0	0	0	1	.167	0
Team totals	155	5274	553	1350	211	41	53	519	491	528	.256	91

=== Pitching ===
Note: W = Wins; L = Losses; ERA = Earned run average; G = Games pitched; GS = Games started; SV = Saves; IP = Innings pitched; H = Hits allowed; R = Runs allowed; ER = Earned runs allowed; HR = Home runs allowed; BB = Walks allowed; K = Strikeouts

Player	W	L	ERA	G	GS	SV	IP	H	R	ER	HR	BB	K
Hi Bithorn	1	0	0.00	2	0	0	2.0	2	0	0	0	0	0
Earl Caldwell	1	4	3.64	40	0	8	54.1	53	23	22	4	30	22
Pete Gebrian	2	3	4.48	27	4	5	66.1	61	40	33	7	33	17
Bob Gillespie	5	8	4.73	25	17	0	118.0	133	71	62	4	53	36
Orval Grove	6	8	4.44	25	19	0	135.2	158	78	67	10	70	33
Earl Harrist	3	8	3.56	33	4	5	93.2	85	48	37	3	49	55
Joe Haynes	14	6	2.42	29	22	0	182.0	174	65	49	5	61	50
Gordon Maltzberger	1	4	3.39	33	0	5	63.2	61	26	24	4	25	22
Thornton Lee	3	7	4.47	21	11	1	86.2	86	50	43	5	56	57
Eddie Lopat	16	13	2.81	31	31	0	252.2	241	88	79	17	73	109
Frank Papish	12	12	3.26	38	26	3	199.0	185	82	72	6	98	79
Johnny Rigney	2	3	1.95	11	7	0	50.2	42	15	11	3	15	19
Red Ruffing	3	5	6.11	9	9	0	53.0	63	39	36	7	16	11
Eddie Smith	1	3	7.29	15	5	0	33.1	40	36	27	1	24	12
Team totals	70	84	3.64	155	155	27	1391.0	1384	661	562	76	603	522

== Farm system ==
Level	Team	League	Manager
AAA	Hollywood Stars	Pacific Coast League	Jimmy Dykes
B	Fall River Indians	New England League	Joe Holden
B	Waterloo White Hawks	Illinois–Indiana–Iowa League	Johnny Mostil and Jack Onslow
C	Oil City Refiners	Middle Atlantic League	Charlie Engle
C	Superior Blues	Northern League	George Treadwell
D	Madisonville Miners	KITTY League	Frank Zubik
D	Lima Terriers	Ohio State League	Merle Settlemire
D	Wisconsin Rapids White Sox	Wisconsin State League	Tony Parisse

LEAGUE CHAMPIONS: Waterloo
