= Deaths in December 1986 =

The following is a list of notable deaths in December 1986.

Entries for each day are listed alphabetically by surname. A typical entry lists information in the following sequence:

- Name, age, country of citizenship at birth, subsequent country of citizenship (if applicable), reason for notability, cause of death (if known), and reference.

== December 1986 ==
=== 1 ===
- Ernest Burkhart, 94, American murderer (Osage Indian murders).
- Lee Dorsey, 61, American singer ("Ya Ya", "Working in the Coal Mine"), emphysema.
- Horace Heidt, 85, American pianist and big band leader.
- Bobby Layne, 59, American NFL footballer (Detroit Lions), cardiac arrest.
- Robert Lee, 73, Taiwanese-born British actor (Mind Your Language).
- Lien Chen-tung, 82, Taiwanese politician, Minister of the Interior.
- Frank McCarthy, 74, American U.S. army general and film producer (Patton), cancer.
- Martin John O'Connor, 86, American Roman Catholic Prelate, rector of the Pontifical North American College.
- Florence Ribeiro, 53, South African anti-apartheid activist, shot
- Zarouhi Sarkissian, 57, Sudanese physician
- Wanis al-Qaddafi, 64, Libyan politician, prime minister of Libya, heart attack.

=== 2 ===
- Desi Arnaz, 69, Cuban-American actor (I Love Lucy) and television producer (Desilu), lung cancer.
- Vrest Orton, 89, American businessman (Vermont Country Store).
- Billy Rancher, 29, American musician, cancer.
- Ken Scott, 58, American actor.
- Dick van Dyke, 55, American politician, member of the Washington House of Representatives, suicide.
- Eli L. Whiteley, 72, American infantry captain in the U.S. Army, Medal of Honor recipient, heart attack.

=== 3 ===
- Guillermo Baldwin, 76, Peruvian Olympic sports shooter (1956)
- Ajit Kumar Basu, 73–74, Indian cardiac surgeon, recipient of Shanti Swarup Bhatnagar Prize.
- Lena Frances Edwards, 86, American physician, recipient of Presidential Medal of Freedom.
- Austin Hayes, 28, English-born footballer (Northampton Town, Ireland), lung cancer.
- Bob Howard, 80, American singer.
- Anthony Mascarenhas, 58, Pakistani journalist and author (Bangladesh: A Legacy of Blood).
- Bob Moorhead, 48, American Major League baseball player (New York Mets).

=== 4 ===
- Reuben Nakian, 89, American sculptor, heart failure.

=== 5 ===
- George Abrams, 87, American baseball player (Cincinnati Reds).
- Raymond Caruana, 26, Maltese political activist, shot.
- Nil Ratan Dhar, 94, Indian soil scientist, founding member of The World Academy of Sciences, complications from fall.
- Charles Duguid, 102, Scottish-born Australian physician and Aboriginal rights activist.
- Roberto Escalada, 72, Argentinian actor, heart attack.
- Theodor Kretschmer, 85, Nazi German Wehrmacht general, recipient of the Knight's Cross of the Iron Cross.
- Lê Trọng Tấn, 72, Vietnamese army general.
- Rolf Schock, 53, French-born American philosopher, accident while repairing vehicle.
- Edward Youde, 65, British politician and diplomat, Governor of Hong Kong, ambassador to China, heart attack.

=== 6 ===
- René Brô, 56, French artist.
- Rozelle Gayle, 67, American jazz pianist and actor, cancer.
- Robert J. Love, 68, Canadian-born American flying ace, heart failure.
- Malik Oussekine, 22, French student, blunt force trauma
- Bhagwan Sahay, 81, Indian politician, governor of Kerala and Jammu and Kashmir.

=== 7 ===
- Enrico Arrigoni, 92, Italian-American anarchist and political activist.
- John Bogart, 86, American Major League Baseball player (Detroit Tigers).
- Austen Gittos, 63, New Zealand fencer (1950 and 1954)
- Roberto Bianchi Montero, 79, Italian actor, director and screenwriter.
- Sydney J. Harris, 69, American journalist (Chicago Daily News, Chicago Sun-Times).
- Concha Méndez, 88, Spanish poet and dramatist (Generation of '27).
- Homa J. Porter, 90, American businessman and political activist.
- Kostas Poulis, 58, Greek footballer and Olympian (1952).
- Albert Schwartz, 78, American Olympic swimmer (1932).

=== 8 ===
- Ernst Biberstein, 87, Nazi German colonel and war criminal.
- Harrison Brown, 69, American nuclear chemist and geochemist (Manhattan Project), lung cancer.
- Walter E. Foran, 67, American politician, member of New Jersey Senate, lung cancer.
- Ernest Gross, 83, French Olympic footballer (1924).
- Georg Henke, 78, East German diplomat, ambassador to North Korea.
- Hollywood Fats, 32, American blues guitarist, heart attack.
- Pip Koehler, 84, American Major League Baseball player (New York Giants).
- Anatoly Marchenko, 48, Soviet dissident and author, hunger strike.
- John Melville, 84, British painter.
- Arthur S. Moreau Jr., 55, American naval admiral, heart attack.
- Heinz Neukirchen, 71, Nazi German naval admiral.
- Józef Pisarski, 73, Polish Olympic boxer (1936).
- Henry Reed, 72, British poet and radio dramatist.
- Christopher Sykes, 79, English writer and biographer.
- Harald Throne-Holst, 81, Norwegian chemical engineer, president of the Federation of Norwegian Industries.

=== 9 ===
- Linda Cook, 24, English murder victim.
- Éamon de Valera, Jnr, 73, Irish obstetrician and gynaecologist, illegally supplied babies to childless couples.
- Maurice E. Dockrell, 78, Irish politician, Teachta Dála, Lord Mayor of Dublin.
- Sherwood Fries, 66, American NFL player (Green Bay Packers).
- T. J. Morgan, 79, Welsh academic, Professor of Welsh at Swansea University.
- Walter J. Stoessel Jr., 66, American diplomat, U.S. Secretary of State, ambassador to three countries, leukemia.
- Edgardo Vaghi, 71, Italian racer and Olympic bobsledder (1936).
- Maxwell Wintrobe, 85, Austrian-born American physician (hematology).
- Anatoly Zverev, 55, Russian artist.

=== 10 ===
- George Ambrum, 43, Australian rugby league player (North Sydney, Australia).
- Susan Cabot, 59, American actress (Tomahawk, Gunsmoke), murdered.
- Yrjö Hakoila, 54, Finnish Olympic rower (1952).
- Emil Johansson, 79, Swedish Olympic boxer (1928).
- Bruno Mora, 49, Italian footballer (AC Milan, Italy), stomach tumour.
- Rino Pucci, 64, Italian Olympic cyclist (1948).
- Victor Guillermo Ramos Rangel, 75, Venezuelan classical musician.
- Fred Stone, 51, Canadian musician.
- Leon G. Turrou, 91, American special agent with the FBI.
- Kate Wolf, 44, American folk singer, leukemia.

=== 11 ===
- Ferenc Kolláth, 72, Hungarian Olympic footballer (1936).
- Karl-Gustav Lagerfelt, 77, Swedish diplomat, ambassador to Austria and the Netherlands.
- Clarence A. Martin, 90, American army general.
- Fritz Maurischat, 93, German production designer (Martin Luther).
- Gus Walker, 74, English bomber pilot in the Royal Air Force.

=== 12 ===
- Rashid Choudhury, 54, Bangladeshi artist.
- Antoni Gościński, 77, Polish medic and Nazi concentration camp internee.
- Gary Lewis, 44, American NFL football player (San Francisco 49ers), Lou Gehrig's disease.
- Harry Owens, 84, American bandleader and songwriter ("Sweet Leilani").
- Carlos Ramírez, 70, Colombian baritone and actor.
- Alexander H. Smith, 82, American mycologist (fungi).
- Clifford Stine, 80, American cinematographer (The Incredible Shrinking Man).
- Paul Verner, 75, East German politician (Socialist Unity Party of Germany).
- Buddy Williams, 68, Australian country singer.
- Johnny Wyrostek, 67, American Major League baseball player (Cincinnati Reds).

=== 13 ===
- Heather Angel, 77, British actress (Peter Pan, Alice in Wonderland), cancer.
- Ella Baker, 83, American civil rights activist.
- Kuwasi Balagoon, 39, American anarchist and political activist (Black Panther Party), fungal pneumonia.
- Glyn Daniel, 72, Welsh archaeologist and editor (Antiquity).
- Thomas Jefferson, 66, American jazz trumpeter.
- Martha Mears, 76, American singer ("Long Ago (and Far Away)", "My Foolish Heart").
- Smita Patil, 31, Indian actress (Bhumika, Chakra), complications from childbirth.
- Kim Peyton, 29, American swimmer and Olympic gold medalist, brain tumour.
- İlhami Sancar, 76–77, Turkish politician, Ministry of National Defense).
- Henry Winston, 75, American political activist, member of Communist Party USA.

=== 14 ===
- Bassey Eyo Ephraim Adam III, 81, Nigerian Efik leader.
- Cheryl Araujo, 25, American rape victim who inspired the movie The Accused, traffic collision.
- Claude Bertrand, 67, French actor, cancer.
- Leo Dove, 83, Australian Olympic sports shooter (1948).
- Aleksey Gushchin, 64, Soviet Olympic gold medalist sports shooter (1960).
- Johan Anker Johansen, 92, Norwegian Olympic gymnast (1920).
- Dick Mehen, 64, American basketball player.
- Antal Páger, 87, Hungarian actor (Drama of the Lark).
- Pedro Sainz Rodríguez, 89, Spanish writer and royal advisor.
- Teh Cheang Wan, 58, Singaporean politician (Minister of National Development), suicide.

=== 15 ===
- David James, 66, British politician, author and adventurer, Member of Parliament.
- Friedrich Karl von Koenig-Warthausen, 80, German aviator and world circumnavigator.
- Erkki Koutonen, 60, American Olympic jumper (1948).
- Serge Lifar, 81, Soviet and French ballet dancer and choreographer (Paris Opera).
- Seymour Lipton, 83, American sculptor (New York School).
- Mykolas Ruzgys, 71, American-born Lithuanian basketball player and coach.
- John Zaremba, 78, American actor (Ben Casey, The Time Tunnel).

=== 16 ===
- Jake Caulfield, 69, American Major League Baseball player (Philadelphia Athletics).
- Oleg Goncharenko, 55, Soviet Ukrainian Olympic speed skater (1956, 1960).
- Clyde Vidrine, 47–48, American bodyguard for Edwin Edwards, shot.

=== 17 ===
- Peter Beauvais, 70, German television director and scriptwriter.
- Guillermo Cano Isaza, 61, Colombian journalist, editor of El Espectador, murdered.
- William Gillies, 72, Scottish Olympic sports shooter (1960, 1964).
- Oscar Goldman, 60–61, American mathematician.
- Oakley Haldeman, 77, American songwriter, composer and author ("Here Comes Santa Claus").
- Władysław Moes, 86, Polish landowner, inspiration for Tadzio in Death in Venice.
- Hans Stelges, German Olympic long-distance runner (1928).
- Mary Verghese, 61, Indian physician.

=== 18 ===
- George Amy, 83, American film editor (Air Force, Yankee Doodle Dandy).
- Alain Caron, 48, Canadian ice hockey player.
- Mamo Clark, 72, American actress (One Million B.C.), cancer.
- Winifred Deforest Coffin, 75, American actress (The Red Skelton Show).
- John D. deButts, 71, American businessman, chief executive officer of AT&T, heart attack.
- Morton Fried, 63, American anthropology teacher, cardiac arrest.
- Ulrico Girardi, 56, Italian Olympic bobsledder (1956).
- Jules Migeot, 88, Belgian Olympic sprinter (1920, 1924).
- Dorothy Molter, 79, American resort owner (Boundary Waters Canoe Area Wilderness).
- Bill Shanner, 92, American Major League Baseball player (Philadelphia Athletics).
- Thomas M. Tarpley, 64, American general in the U.S. Army.
- Steve Uhrinyak, 72, American NFL player (Washington Redskins).

=== 19 ===
- V. C. Andrews, 63, American novelist (Flowers in the Attic), breast cancer.
- Mario de Armas, 70, Cuban Olympic sports shooter (1952).
- Andrei Chabanenko, 77, Soviet naval admiral.
- Werner Dankwort, 91, German diplomat, ambassador to Brazil and Canada.
- Willy Favre, 43, Swiss Olympic alpine skier (1964, 1968).
- Fritiof Fryxell, 86, American geologist and naturalist.
- Roger Grove, 78, American NFL player (Green Bay Packers).
- Hulan Jack, 79, Saint Lucian–born American politician, cancer.
- Del Lyman, 68, American NFL player.
- Kenyon Nicholson, 92, American playwright.
- Ernest Gordon Rupp, 76, British Methodist preacher, theologian and historian.
- Al Stokes, 86, American Major League Baseball player (Boston Red Sox).

=== 20 ===
- Ferdinand Brandner, 83, Austrian aerospace engineer, Nazi SS member.
- Rossella Como, 47, Italian actress and television personality, cancer.
- Joe DeSa, 27, American Major League baseball player (St. Louis Cardinals), traffic collision.
- Julie Kogon, 68, American lightweight boxer.
- Kathleen Morris, 93, Canadian painter, member of Beaver Hall Group.
- William A. Nolen, 58, American surgeon and medical columnist (McCall's magazine).
- Silvano Melea Otieno, 54–55, Kenyan lawyer, heart attack.
- Sir Harry Platt, 100, English orthopaedic surgeon, president of the Royal College of Surgeons of England.
- Floriano Vaz, 23, Indian writer, shot.

=== 21 ===
- Willy Coppens, 94, Belgian flying ace, "balloon buster".
- Gilbert Laithwaite, 92, Irish-born British diplomat.
- S. Nadesan, 82, Sri Lankan lawyer and politician.
- Francis Junior Pierce, 62, American hospital corpsman, Medal of Honor recipient, lung cancer.
- Bill Simpson, 55, Scottish actor (Dr. Finlay's Casebook), pneumonia.

=== 22 ===
- Mary Burchell, (Ida Cook), 82, British novelist and humanitarian, cancer.
- Celius Dougherty, 84, American composer.
- Maurice Grosser, 83, American painter and author.
- John Macy, 69, American government administrator, director of the Federal Emergency Management Agency.
- Nii Amaa Ollennu, 80, Ghanaian politician, acting president.
- David Penhaligon, 42, British politician, Member of Parliament, President of the Liberal Party, traffic collision.
- Saqi, 61, Pakistani actor.
- Jean-Paul St. Laurent, 74, Canadian politician, House of Commons member.
- Harvey Stephens, 85, American actor and pilot.
- Sieglinda Zigler, 67, Brazilian Olympic swimmer (1936).

=== 23 ===
- Gerhard Bienert, 88, German actor.
- Marjorie Husted, 94, American businesswoman ("Betty Crocker").
- János Karlovits, 87, Hungarian Olympic pole vaulter (1928).
- Hazard E. Reeves, 80, American sound editor, heart attack.
- R. Gordon Wasson, 88, American ethnomycologist (hallucinogenic mushrooms) and author.
- Dan Wilson, 71, American baseball player.

=== 24 ===
- Guy Barnett, 58, British politician, Member of Parliament, heart attack.
- Gardner Fox, 75, American comic book writer and novelist, co-creator of Flash, pneumonia.
- Eric Malcolm Jones, 79, British intelligence officer, director of GCHQ.
- Arnold Kettle, 70, British Marxist literary critic.
- Bob Lulham, 60, Australian rugby league player (Balmain Tigers, Australia), heart attack.
- Gerda Munck, 85, Danish Olympic fencer (1932).
- Ed O'Keefe, 73, Australian footballer
- Albert Widmann, 74, German chemist and convicted war criminal (Aktion T4).
- Sir Richard van der Riet Woolley, 80, English astronomer, Astronomer Royal.

=== 25 ===
- Omraam Mikhaël Aïvanhov, 86, Bulgarian philosopher.
- Édouard Barbazan, 84, French Olympic high jumper (1924).
- Friedrich von Ledebur, 86, Austrian actor, (Moby Dick, Alexander the Great).
- James C. Oliver, 91, American politician, member of the U.S. House of Representatives.
- Hamao Umezawa, 72, Japanese microbiologist, pneumonia.

=== 26 ===
- Carl Cohen, 73, American gambling executive (El Rancho Vegas, Sands Hotel and Casino).
- Bina Das, 75, Indian revolutionary.
- Leslie Dwyer, 80, English actor, respiratory failure.
- Håkon Gundersen, 79 Norwegian Olympic footballer (1936).
- Elsa Lanchester, 84, British actress (Witness for the Prosecution, Come to the Stable, Mary Poppins), pneumonia.
- Niilo Orama, 60, Finnish Olympic sailor (1948).
- Robert Stannard, 91, English Anglican clergyman

=== 27 ===
- Amanda Junquera Butler, 88, Spanish writer.
- George Dangerfield, 82, American author (The Strange Death of Liberal England), literary editor of Vanity Fair, leukemia.
- Snorri Hjartarson, 80, Icelandic poet
- Cara Knott, 20, American murder victim.
- Lars-Erik Larsson, 78, Swedish composer and conductor (A Winter's Tale, Pastoral Suite), diabetes.
- Clive Longe, 47, British Olympic athlete (1968).
- Dumas Malone, 94, American historian (Jefferson and His Time).
- Semyon Rzhishchin, 53, Soviet Russian Olympic athlete (1956, 1960).
- Albert W. Sherer Jr., 70, American diplomat, ambassador to Togo, Equatorial Guinea, Guinea and Czechoslovakia.
- Jack Wallaesa, 67, American Major League Baseball player (Philadelphia Athletics, Chicago White Sox).

=== 28 ===
- Joseph Leon Blau, 77, American philosopher and Jewish historian.
- Lothar Bolz, 83, East German politician, Minister of Foreign Affairs.
- Jacques Couderc de Fonlongue, 95, French Olympic equestrian (1928).
- Terry Dolan, 36, American right-wing political activist, closeted homosexual who publicly attacked gay rights, AIDS.
- Harry Else, 80, American Negro league baseball player.
- Huang Kecheng, 84, Chinese People's Liberation Army general.
- Alton Lennon, 80, American politician, member of the U.S. House of Representatives and Senate.
- John D. MacDonald, 70, American novelist (The Executioners), complications from heart surgery.
- Jan Nieuwenhuys, 64, Dutch painter.
- Joel Resnicoff, 38, American artist and fashion illustrator, AIDS.

=== 29 ===
- John Antill, 82, Australian composer (Corroboree).
- Jim Barnden, 60, New Zealand boxer
- Orville Hodge, 82, American Auditor of Public Accounts and convicted embezzler.
- Philip B. Hofmann, 77, American businessman, chairman of Johnson & Johnson, heart attack.
- Sitaram Lalas, 78, Indian lexicographer.
- Harold Macmillan, 92, British politician, Prime Minister of the United Kingdom.
- Grete Mosheim, 81, German-born actress (Car of Dreams), cancer.
- Pietro Parente, 95, Italian Roman Catholic cardinal.
- Andrei Tarkovsky, 54, Soviet film director (Mirror, Andrei Rublev, Stalker), lung cancer.

=== 30 ===
- Cassie Brown, 67, Canadian journalist and author (Death on the Ice, The Wreck of the Florizel).
- İlhan Koman, 65, Turkish-Swedish sculptor (Akdeniz).
- Charles Magnante, 81, American accordionist.
- Era Bell Thompson, 81, American novelist.
- Antero Vanhanen, 51, Russian-born Finnish Olympic wrestler (1960).

=== 31 ===
- Clayton Bourne, 82, Canadian Olympic swimmer (1924).
- Provine Bradley, 79, American Negro Leagues baseball player.
- Piero Chiara, 73, Italian writer.
- Donald Fleming, 81, Canadian politician, Member of Parliament, International Monetary Fund official, stroke.
- Lloyd Haynes, 52, American actor (Room 222), lung cancer.
- Geoffrey Audley Miles, 96, British admiral in the Royal Navy.
- Raj Narain, 69, Indian politician, member of Lok Sabha, heart attack.
- Don Sleet, 48, American jazz trumpeter, lymphoma.
- Bartho Smit, 62, South African writer, cancer.
- Esther Sutherland, 54, American actress.
- Dwight Taylor, 83, American author and screenwriter, heart attack.

=== Unknown date ===
- Pearl Frush, 79, American pin-up and glamour illustration artist.
- Jim O'Connolly, 60, English actor, director and screenwriter (Edgar Wallace Mysteries).
- Robert Osgood, 64–65, American expert on foreign and military policy,
- Toño Salazar, 99, Salvadoran caricaturist, illustrator and diplomat, Parkinson's disease.
- John R. Wiegand, 74, German-born American scientist (Wiegand effect).
