= 1946 Philadelphia Athletics season =

1946 Philadelphia Athletics
- League: American League
- Ballpark: Shibe Park
- City: Philadelphia
- Record: 49–105 (.318)
- League place: 8th
- Owners: Connie Mack
- Managers: Connie Mack
- Radio: WIBG (By Saam, Claude Haring)

The 1946 Philadelphia Athletics season involved the A's finishing eighth in the American League with a record of 49 wins and 105 losses.

== Regular season ==
Buddy Rosar led the American League in assists and set the record for errorless games by a catcher, posting a 1.000 fielding percentage in 117 games.

=== Season standings ===
American League
Team	W	L	Pct.	GB	Home	Road
Boston Red Sox	104	50	.675	—	61‍–‍16	43‍–‍34
Detroit Tigers	92	62	.597	12	48‍–‍30	44‍–‍32
New York Yankees	87	67	.565	17	47‍–‍30	40‍–‍37
Washington Senators	76	78	.494	28	38‍–‍38	38‍–‍40
Chicago White Sox	74	80	.481	30	40‍–‍38	34‍–‍42
Cleveland Indians	68	86	.442	36	36‍–‍41	32‍–‍45
St. Louis Browns	66	88	.429	38	35‍–‍41	31‍–‍47
Philadelphia Athletics	49	105	.318	55	31‍–‍46	18‍–‍59

=== Record vs. opponents ===
1946 American League record Sources:
Team	BOS	CWS	CLE	DET	NYY	PHA	SLB	WSH
Boston	—	13–9	15–7	15–7–1	14–8	17–5	14–8–1	16–6
Chicago	9–13	—	13–9–1	10–12	8–14	12–10	12–10	10–12
Cleveland	7–15	9–13–1	—	5–17	10–12	15–7	15–7–1	7–15
Detroit	7–15–1	12–10	17–5	—	13–9	17–5	14–8	12–10
New York	8–14	14–8	12–10	9–13	—	16–6	14–8	14–8
Philadelphia	5–17	10–12	7–15	5–17	6–16	—	10–12	6–16–1
St. Louis	8–14–1	10–12	7–15–1	8–14	8–14	12–10	—	13–9
Washington	6–16	12–10	15–7	10–12	8–14	16–6–1	9–13	—

=== Roster ===
1946 Philadelphia Athletics
Roster
Pitchers: 20 Joe Berry; 24 Herman Besse; 31 Norm Brown; 17 Russ Christopher; 36 Joe Coleman; 28 Pat Cooper; 38 Everett Fagan; 19 Jesse Flores; 25 Dick Fowler; 31 Lee Griffeth; 18 Lum Harris; 30 Lou Knerr; 35 Jack Knott; 23 Phil Marchildon; 40 Bill McCahan; 16 Bobo Newsom; 37 Bob Savage; 28 Porter Vaughan	Catchers: 33 George Armstrong; -- Joe Astroth; 9 Gene Desautels; 8 Buddy Rosar; Infielders: 14 Jake Caulfield; 22 Oscar Grimes; 6 Irv Hall; 15 Gene Handley; 7 George Kell; 36,37 Bruce Konopka; 3 Hank Majeski; 5 George McQuinn; -- Don Richmond; 12 Pete Suder; 10,11 Jack Wallaesa	Outfielders: 38 Vern Benson; 4 Sam Chapman; 2 Russ Derry; 1 Ford Garrison; 7 Barney McCosky; 3 Hal Peck; 1 Tuck Stainback; 21 Elmer Valo	Manager: -- Connie Mack; Coaches: 26 Earle Brucker; 29 Dave Keefe; 27 Earle Mack; 32 Al Simmons

== Player stats ==
=== Batting ===
==== Starters by position ====
Note: Pos = Position; G = Games played; AB = At bats; H = Hits; Avg. = Batting average; HR = Home runs; RBI = Runs batted in

Pos	Player	G	AB	H	Avg.	HR	RBI
C	Buddy Rosar	121	424	120	.283	2	47
1B	George McQuinn	136	484	109	.225	3	35
2B	Gene Handley	89	251	63	.251	0	21
SS	Pete Suder	128	455	128	.281	2	50
3B	Hank Majeski	78	264	66	.250	1	25
OF	Elmer Valo	108	348	107	.307	1	31
OF	Barney McCosky	92	308	109	.354	1	34
OF	Sam Chapman	146	545	142	.261	20	67

==== Other batters ====
Note: G = Games played; AB = At bats; H = Hits; Avg. = Batting average; HR = Home runs; RBI = Runs batted in

Player	G	AB	H	Avg.	HR	RBI
Tuck Stainback	91	291	71	.244	0	20
Jack Wallaesa	63	194	38	.196	5	11
Oscar Grimes	59	191	50	.262	1	20
Irv Hall	63	185	46	.249	0	19
Russ Derry	69	184	38	.207	0	14
Hal Peck	48	150	37	.247	2	11
Gene Desautels	52	130	28	.215	0	13
Jake Caulfield	44	94	26	.277	0	10
Bruce Konopka	38	93	22	.237	0	9
George Kell	26	87	26	.299	0	11
Don Richmond	16	62	18	.290	1	9
Ford Garrison	9	37	4	.108	0	0
Joe Astroth	4	7	1	.143	0	0
George Armstrong	8	6	1	.167	0	0
Vern Benson	7	5	0	.000	0	0

=== Pitching ===
==== Starting pitchers ====
Note: G = Games pitched; IP = Innings pitched; W = Wins; L = Losses; ERA = Earned run average; SO = Strikeouts

Player	G	IP	W	L	ERA	SO
Phil Marchildon	36	226.2	13	16	3.49	95
Dick Fowler	32	205.2	9	16	3.28	89
Lou Knerr	30	148.1	3	16	5.40	58
Bobo Newsom	10	58.2	3	5	3.38	32

==== Other pitchers ====
Note: G = Games pitched; IP = Innings pitched; W = Wins; L = Losses; ERA = Earned run average; SO = Strikeouts

Player	G	IP	W	L	ERA	SO
Bob Savage	40	164.0	3	15	4.06	78
Jesse Flores	29	155.0	9	7	2.32	48
Lum Harris	34	125.1	3	14	5.24	33
Russ Christopher	30	119.1	5	7	4.30	79
Herman Besse	7	20.2	0	2	5.23	10
Bill McCahan	4	18.0	1	1	1.00	6
Joe Coleman	4	13.0	0	2	5.54	8
Jack Knott	3	6.1	0	1	5.68	2

==== Relief pitchers ====
Note: G = Games pitched; W = Wins; L = Losses; SV = Saves; ERA = Earned run average; SO = Strikeouts

Player	G	W	L	SV	ERA	SO
Everett Fagan	20	0	1	0	4.80	12
Lee Griffeth	10	0	0	0	2.93	4
Joe Berry	5	0	1	0	2.77	5
Norm Brown	4	0	1	0	6.14	3
Pat Cooper	1	0	0	0	0.00	0
Porter Vaughan	1	0	0	0	----	0

== Farm system ==
Level	Team	League	Manager
AAA	Toronto Maple Leafs	International League	Harry Davis and Bill Norman
A	Savannah Indians	Sally League	Chief Bender and Lena Blackburne
B	Lancaster Red Roses	Interstate League	Tom Oliver
C	Kingston Ponies	Border League	Ben Lady
C	Martinsville Athletics	Carolina League	Cliff Bolton
D	Federalsburg A's	Eastern Shore League	Lew Krausse, Sr.
D	Lexington A's	North Carolina State League	Jimmy Maus
