= Ed Fernandes =

American baseball player (1918–1968)

- Catcher
- Born: March 11, 1918; Oakland, California, U.S.
- Died: November 27, 1968 (aged 50); Hayward, California, U.S.
- Batted: Both Threw: Right

MLB debut
- June 9, 1940, for the Pittsburgh Pirates

Last MLB appearance
- July 7, 1946, for the Chicago White Sox

MLB statistics
- Batting average: .185
- Home runs: 0
- Runs batted in: 6
- Stats at Baseball Reference

Teams
- Pittsburgh Pirates (1940); Chicago White Sox (1946)

Edward Paul Fernandes (March 11, 1918 – November 27, 1968) was an American professional baseball catcher whose 18-year career included one full season and part of another in Major League Baseball as a member of the 1940 Pittsburgh Pirates and 1946 Chicago White Sox.

Born in Oakland, California, Fernandes was a switch hitter who threw right-handed, stood 5 feet 9 inches (1.75 m) tall and weighed 185 pounds (84 kg). He entered pro baseball at 17 in 1935 and made his MLB debut with Pittsburgh in June 1940 after hitting .333 in the top-level Pacific Coast League. But he collected only four hits over the next four months, and batted a weak .118 in 28 games in a Pirate uniform. He returned to the minor leagues from 1941–1944, then spent 1945 serving in the United States Navy during the final year of World War II. Fernandes then spent all of 1946 with the White Sox, although he appeared in only 14 games. Playing behind Mike Tresh, Frankie Hayes and George Dickey, Fernandes started nine games as Chicago's fourth catcher, and his eight hits doubled his 1940 total.

He returned to the minors in 1947, having batted .185 (eight for 41) with three doubles and six runs batted in in 42 career big-league games. Late in his active career, he served as a player-manager in the Class C Pioneer League for two seasons. He died in Hayward, California, at age 50 on November 27, 1968.
