= Ernest Gross =

Ernest Gross may refer to:

- Ernest Gross (footballer) (1902–1986), French footballer
- Ernest A. Gross (1906–1999), American diplomat and lawyer
