= George Armstrong (baseball) =

American baseball player (1924-1993)

- Catcher
- Born: June 3, 1924; Orange, New Jersey, U.S.
- Died: July 24, 1993 (aged 69); Orange, New Jersey, U.S.
- Batted: Right Threw: Right

MLB debut
- April 26, 1946, for the Philadelphia Athletics

Last MLB appearance
- June 23, 1946, for the Philadelphia Athletics

MLB statistics
- Batting average: .167
- Home runs: 0
- Runs batted in: 0
- Stats at Baseball Reference

Teams
- Philadelphia Athletics (1946)

Noble George "Dodo" Armstrong (June 3, 1924 – July 24, 1993) was an American professional baseball player, a catcher whose nine-season (1943–1951) career included eight games played in the Major Leagues for the 1946 Philadelphia Athletics. The native of Orange, New Jersey, threw and batted right-handed. He stood 5 feet 10 inches (1.78 m) tall and weighed 190 pounds (86 kg).

Apart from those eight games in the Majors, and 15 games played for the 1946 Savannah Indians of the Class A Sally League, Armstrong's professional career took place at the Class B level, or lower, of minor league baseball. His only MLB hit, a double, came in his first big-league at bat as a pinch hitter against Dave Ferriss of the Boston Red Sox at Shibe Park on April 26, 1946. During his debut, Armstrong relieved starting catcher Gene Desautels and stayed in the game to record three errorless chances in the field. In his subsequent seven games in the Majors, he was hitless in five more at bats, with one base on balls, before returning to the minor leagues in midseason.
