= Frank Whitman (baseball) =

American baseball player (1924–1994)

- Shortstop
- Born: August 15, 1924; Marengo, Indiana, U.S.
- Died: February 6, 1994 (aged 69); Maryville, Illinois, U.S.
- Batted: Right Threw: Right

MLB debut
- June 30, 1946, for the Chicago White Sox

Last MLB appearance
- September 28, 1948, for the Chicago White Sox

MLB statistics
- Batting average: .045
- Runs: 7
- Hits: 1
- Stats at Baseball Reference

Teams
- Chicago White Sox (1946; 1948)

Walter Franklin Whitman (August 15, 1924 – February 6, 1994) was an American shortstop in Major League Baseball who played for the Chicago White Sox in parts of two seasons. Hooker, as he was dubbed, appeared in 20 games for the Sox in their 1946 and 1948 seasons.
