= Bruce Konopka =

American baseball player (1919–1996)

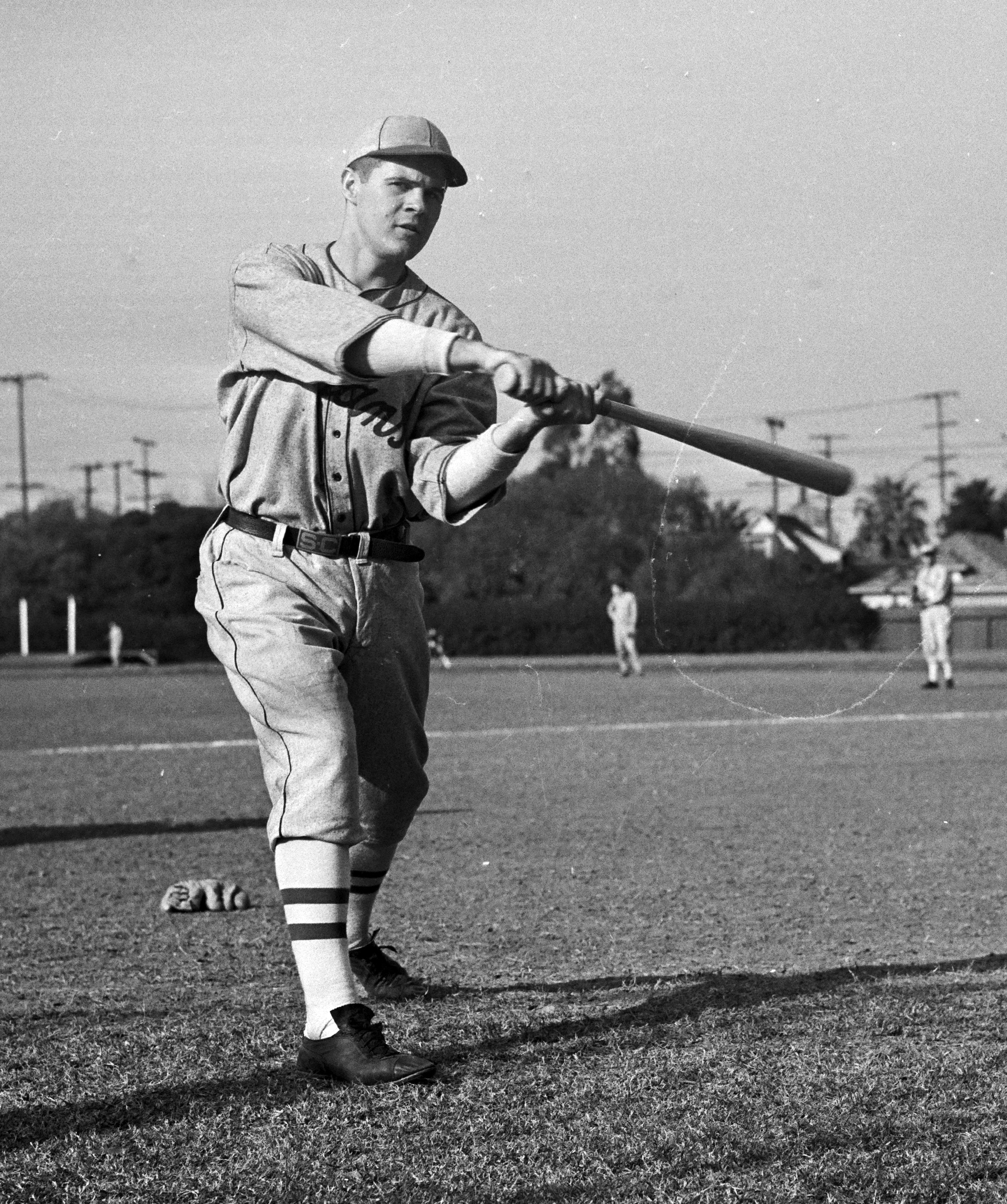
- Konopka as a player for USC, 1940
- First baseman
- Born: September 16, 1919; Hammond, Indiana, US
- Died: September 27, 1996 (aged 77); Denver, Colorado, US
- Batted: Left Threw: Left

MLB debut
- June 7, 1942, for the Philadelphia Athletics

Last MLB appearance
- September 29, 1946, for the Philadelphia Athletics

MLB statistics
- Batting average: .238
- Home runs: 0
- Runs batted in: 10
- Stats at Baseball Reference

Teams
- Philadelphia Athletics (1942–1943; 1946)

Bruno Bruce Konopka (September 16, 1919 – September 27, 1996) was an American professional baseball player during the 1940s. A first baseman, his four-season (1942–1943; 1946–1947) professional career was interrupted by service in the United States Navy in the Pacific Theater of Operations during World War II. However, Konopka did appear in 45 Major League games for the Philadelphia Athletics during the 1942, 1943 and 1946 seasons.

== Biography ==
He was born in Hammond, Indiana, but attended Manual High School in Denver, Colorado, and college at the University of Southern California.

Konopka batted and threw left-handed. He stood 6 feet 2 inches (1.88 m) tall and weighed 190 pounds (86 kg).

He made his Major League debut in his first pro season. In his first game, June 7 at Shibe Park, he relieved Dick Siebert at first base for the Athletics, but was held hitless in two at bats by Bob Muncrief of the St. Louis Browns. He registered his first MLB hit, a single, as a pinch hitter 16 days later. He spent most of the rest of that season with the Class B Wilmington Blue Rocks, but returned to the Athletics in September to go two-for-four against the Washington Senators on September 19. He batted only twice for the Athletics in 1943 before being called into the military. Then he split the 1946 season between Philadelphia and the Triple-A Toronto Maple Leafs and San Diego Padres. In 38 games for the 1946 A's, 20 as the starting first baseman, he collected 22 hits, including four doubles and a triple. Altogether, during his brief MLB career, he had 25 hits, scored nine runs, and logged ten runs batted in. He did not hit a home run.

Konopka played one more year in minor league baseball, in 1947 at the Double-A level, before leaving baseball. He died in Denver at the age of 77.
