= Len Perme =

American baseball player (1917–2009)

- Pitcher
- Born: November 25, 1917; Cleveland, Ohio, U.S.
- Died: January 24, 2009 (aged 92); Hayward, California, U.S.
- Batted: Left Threw: Left

MLB debut
- September 8, 1942, for the Chicago White Sox

Last MLB appearance
- June 9, 1946, for the Chicago White Sox

MLB statistics
- Win–loss record: 0–1
- Earned run average: 3.12
- Strikeouts: 6
- Stats at Baseball Reference

Teams
- Chicago White Sox (1942, 1946)

Leonard John Perme (November 25, 1917 – January 24, 2009) was an American professional baseball pitcher in Major League Baseball who played for the Chicago White Sox in the 1942 and 1946 seasons. Listed at 6 ft 0 in (1.83 m), 170 lb., he batted and threw left-handed.

A native of Cleveland, Ohio, Perme was one of many major leaguers who saw his baseball career interrupted by a military stint during World War II. He started his professional career in the Northern League, pitching for the Fargo-Moorhead Twins (1938–1940) and Superior Blues (1941).

In 1942, Perme earned a call-up to the Chicago White Sox in late September after going 15–11 with a 3.22 ERA for Superior. He finished with a 0–1 mark and a 1.38 ERA in four appearances, and would appear to have a guaranteed spot in the rotation heading into the next year, but he had to join the military. He served in the US Navy from 1943 to 1946 and rejoined the Sox after being discharged during the 1946 midseason, but he not recovered his old form.

In a two-season career, Perme posted a 0–1 record with a 3.12 ERA in eight appearances, including one start, giving up six runs on 11 hits and 11 walks while striking out six in 17 1/3 innings of work.

Following his brief stint in major leagues, Perme resumed his career in the minors pitching for the Williamsport Tigers (1947–48), Toledo Mud Hens (1949) and Cubs de Drummondville (1951).

Perme died in Hayward, California, at the age of 91.

== See also ==
- 1942 Chicago White Sox season
- 1946 Chicago White Sox season
