= Bud Sketchley =

Canadian baseball player (1919–1979)

- Right fielder
- Born: March 30, 1919; Virden, Manitoba, Canada
- Died: December 19, 1979 (aged 60); Los Angeles, California, U.S.
- Batted: Left Threw: Left

MLB debut
- April 14, 1942, for the Chicago White Sox

Last MLB appearance
- April 29, 1942, for the Chicago White Sox

MLB statistics
- Games played: 13
- Batting average: .194
- Runs batted in: 3
- Stats at Baseball Reference

Teams
- Chicago White Sox (1942)

Harry Clement "Bud" Sketchley (March 30, 1919 – December 19, 1979) was a Canadian-born professional baseball outfielder who played one season in Organized Baseball during World War II, including 13 appearances as a right fielder and pinch hitter in the majors for the 1942 Chicago White Sox. He threw and batted left-handed and was listed as 5 feet 10 inches (1.78 m) tall and 180 pounds (82 kg).

Born in Virden, Manitoba, Sketchley attended secondary school (Hollywood High School) and university (UCLA) in Los Angeles, California.

His one season of organized ball, 1942, was the first year of the United States' participation as a belligerent in World War II.

Sketchley debuted by appearing in 13 early season MLB games for the White Sox. He started in right field on Opening Day at Comiskey Park against Bob Muncrief of the St. Louis Browns and went one for three, a single in the fifth inning. All told his 13 big-league games played including 12 games started in right field; Sketchley collected seven hits and seven bases on balls in 45 plate appearances. He had one extra-base hit, a double.

After April 29, Sketchley was sent down to the Class B Three–I League, where he batted .267 with 67 hits in 82 games.

He died in Los Angeles at age 60 on December 19, 1979.
