= Ed Weiland =

American baseball player (1914–1971)

- Pitcher
- Born: November 26, 1914; Evanston, Illinois, U.S.
- Died: July 12, 1971 (aged 56); Chicago, Illinois, U.S.
- Batted: Left Threw: Right

MLB debut
- May 1, 1940, for the Chicago White Sox

Last MLB appearance
- September 22, 1942, for the Chicago White Sox

MLB statistics
- Win–loss record: 0–0
- Earned run average: 8.25
- Strikeouts: 7
- Stats at Baseball Reference

Teams
- Chicago White Sox (1940, 1942)

Edwin Nicholas Weiland (November 26, 1914 – July 12, 1971) was an American professional baseball pitcher who played for two seasons in Major League Baseball. He pitched for the Chicago White Sox for five games during the 1940 Chicago White Sox season and 1942 Chicago White Sox season. He served in the military during World War II.
