= Lee Griffeth =

American baseball player (1925-2007)

- Pitcher
- Born: May 20, 1925; Carmel, New York, U.S.
- Died: August 3, 2007 (aged 82); Durham, North Carolina, U.S.
- Batted: Both Threw: Left

MLB debut
- June 25, 1946, for the Philadelphia Athletics

Last MLB appearance
- August 6, 1946, for the Philadelphia Athletics

MLB statistics
- Win–loss record: 0-0
- Earned run average: 2.93
- Strikeouts: 4
- Stats at Baseball Reference

Teams
- Philadelphia Athletics (1946)

Leon Clifford Griffeth (May 20, 1925 – August 3, 2007) was an American Major League Baseball pitcher. Listed at 5' 11", 180 lb., he was a switch-hitter and threw left-handed.

Born in Carmel, New York, Griffeth pitched briefly for the Philadelphia Athletics during the 1946 season.

In a ten-game career, he posted a 2.93 earned run average with four strikeouts and six walks in 15⅓ innings of work, and did not have a decision. He also played eight minor league seasons from 1946 through 1953, posting a 44-52 record and a 4.15 ERA in 197 pitching appearances.

Griffeth died in Durham, North Carolina, at the age of 82.
