= Bill Mueller (outfielder) =

American baseball player (1920–2001)

- Center fielder
- Born: November 9, 1920; Bay City, Michigan, U.S.
- Died: October 24, 2001 (aged 80); Glenview, Illinois, U.S.
- Batted: Right Threw: Right

MLB debut
- August 29, 1942, for the Chicago White Sox

Last MLB appearance
- September 25, 1945, for the Chicago White Sox

MLB statistics
- Batting average: .149
- Home runs: 0
- Runs batted in: 5
- Stats at Baseball Reference

Teams
- Chicago White Sox (1942, 1945)

William Lawrence Mueller (November 9, 1920 – October 24, 2001) was an American professional baseball center fielder who played for the Chicago White Sox of Major League Baseball in 1942 and 1945. Mueller's career was interrupted while he served in the military during World War II, causing him to miss the 1943 and 1944 seasons. Listed at 6 feet 1.5 inches (1.867 m) and 180 pounds (82 kg), he batted and threw right-handed.

== Career ==
Mueller first played professionally in 1939, appearing in 16 games for the Class D Alexandria Aces of the Evangeline Baseball League. He pitched in 12 of those 16 games, compiling a 2–4 record with a 4.08 earned run average (ERA).

In 1940, baseball records indicate that Mueller played for three different teams, one in Class C and two in Class B; however, his statistics for this season are incomplete. Newspaper reports of the era show that he was pitching with the Hazleton Mountaineers of the Interstate League in May, and for the Saginaw Athletics of the Michigan State League in June. It does not appear that Mueller pitched again after this season.

In 1941, he appeared in 103 games for the Class D Jonesboro White Sox of the Northeast Arkansas League, compiling a .278 batting average. In 1942, Mueller split time between the Class B Waterloo Hawks of the Three–I League (99 games) and the major league Chicago White Sox (26 games, in late August and September). His contract was purchased by the White Sox when outfielder Taffy Wright had to report for military duty. Mueller batted .276 with Waterloo and only .165 with Chicago.

Mueller served in the United States Navy from December 1942 through July 1945, thus missing the 1943 and 1944 baseball seasons. During August and September 1945, Mueller appeared in 13 games for the White Sox, going hitless in nine at bats. In 1946, Mueller played for two Double-A teams in the Texas League; the Tulsa Oilers and the Dallas Rebels, farm teams for the Chicago Cubs and Detroit Tigers, respectively. He did not play professionally after 1946.

With the White Sox, Mueller appeared in a total of 39 major league games, batting 14-for-94 (.149) with five runs batted in (RBIs) and no home runs.

== Personal life ==
Mueller went to Bay City Central High School in Bay City, Michigan, where he was a three-sport athlete; baseball, basketball, and football. He met his wife, Ruth Ann, when he was serving in the Navy; they were married 1944, and later had two sons.

After his baseball career, Mueller worked for a jewelry supply company and later ran his own jewelry store. He died in October 2001 at age 80; he is interred at Memorial Park Cemetery in Skokie, Illinois.
