= Bob Gillespie =

American baseball player (1919–2001)

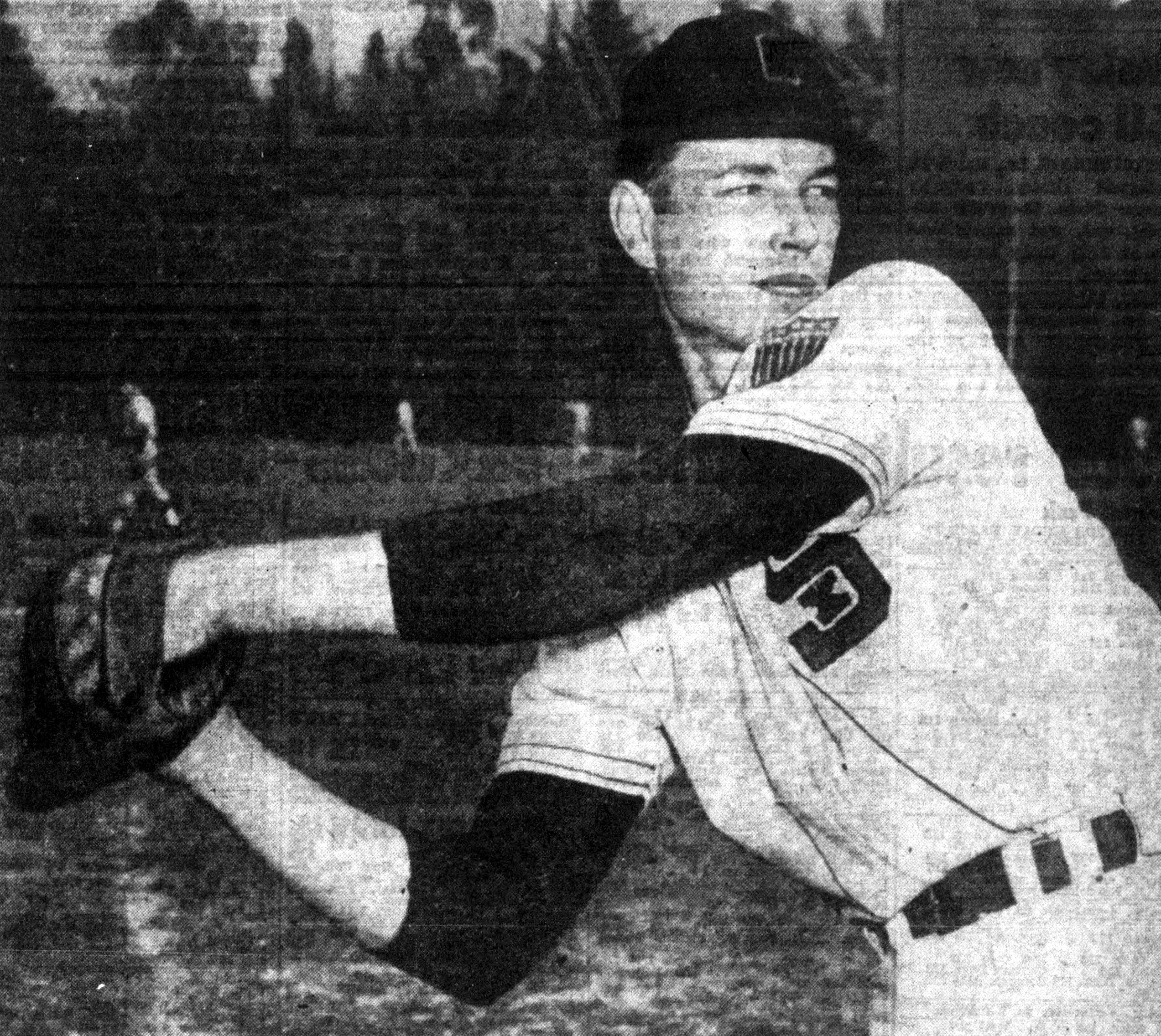
- Gillespie, circa 1948
- Pitcher
- Born: October 8, 1919; Columbus, Ohio, U.S.
- Died: November 4, 2001 (aged 82); Winston-Salem, North Carolina, U.S.
- Batted: Right Threw: Right

MLB debut
- May 11, 1944, for the Detroit Tigers

Last MLB appearance
- May 11, 1950, for the Boston Red Sox

MLB statistics
- Win–loss record: 5–13
- Earned run average: 5.07
- Strikeouts: 59
- Stats at Baseball Reference

Teams
- Detroit Tigers (1944); Chicago White Sox (1947–1948); Boston Red Sox (1950)

Robert William Gillespie (October 8, 1919 – November 4, 2001) was an American pitcher in Major League Baseball who played between 1944 and 1950 for the Detroit Tigers (1944), Chicago White Sox (1947–48) and Boston Red Sox (1950). Listed at 6 ft 4 in (1.93 m), 187 lb., Gillespie batted and threw right-handed. The native of Columbus, Ohio, served in the United States Coast Guard during World War II.

In a four-season career, Gillespie posted a 5–13 record with a 4.73 ERA in 58 pitching appearances, including 23 starts, two complete games, 59 strikeouts, 102 walks, and 202 1/3 innings of work.

Gillespie died in Winston-Salem, North Carolina on November 4, 2001, at the age of 82.
