= Robert Osgood =

American foreign policy expert and author

Robert Endicott Osgood (1921–1986) was an expert on foreign and military policy, and the author of several significant texts on international relations. He taught at Johns Hopkins University for twenty five years, and also served as an advisor to Ronald Reagan during the latter's 1980 presidential campaign.

== Biography ==
Osgood was born in St Louis. He attended Harvard University, where he attained his bachelor's degree as well as his doctorate. He also served in World War II.

His teaching career began in 1956 when he became assistant professor of political science at the University of Chicago. In 1961 he became Christian A. Herter Professor of American Foreign Policy in the School of Advanced International Studies at Johns Hopkins University.

In 1969, he took a leave to serve for a year as a staff aide on the U.S. National Security Council, headed by Henry A. Kissinger, in the Nixon Administration.

Osgood directed the Washington Center of Foreign Policy Research at Johns Hopkins University from 1965 to 1973. From 1973 to 1979 he was dean of the School of Advanced International Studies.

He served as an advisor during Ronald Reagan's 1980 presidential campaign, and in 1983, Secretary of State George P. Shultz named him to the Policy Planning Council.

He died of a heart attack, just after Christmas, in 1986. He was living in Chevy Chase Md. at the time. He was survived by his wife, the former Gretchen Anderson, and a sister, Eleanor Chessman of Granville, Ohio.

The Osgood Center for International Relations is named for him.

== Bibliography ==
- 1953 Ideals and Self-interest in America's Foreign Relations: Great Transformation of the Twentieth Century ISBN 978-0226637785
- 1957 Limited War: The Challenge to American Strategy
- 1962 NATO: The Entangling Alliance
- 1962 Nuclear Control in NATO
- 1964 The Case for the MLF
- 1967 Force, Order & Justice ASIN: B0006BQMIC
- 1968 The Nature of Alliances
- 1979 Limited War Revisited
- 1986 Deterrence: The Western Approach
