= Steve Uhrinyak =

American football player (1914–1986)

Profile
- Positions: Guard, tackle

Personal information
- Born: November 23, 1914; Homestead, Pennsylvania, U.S.
- Died: December 18, 1986 (aged 72)
- Listed height: 6 ft 2 in (1.88 m)
- Listed weight: 218 lb (99 kg)

Career information
- College: Franklin & Marshall

Career history
- Washington Redskins (1939)
- Stats at Pro Football Reference

Steven James Uhrinyak (November 23, 1914 – December 18, 1986) was an American football guard and tackle. Born in 1914 in Homestead, Pennsylvania, he played college football at Franklin & Marshall College from 1936 to 1938. In 1939, he signed with the Washington Redskins of the National Football League (NFL). He was converted by coach Ray Flaherty from a guard to a tackle and appeared as a backup in the season opener against the Eagles. He was released after the first game as he "appeared a little too green" for NFL competition. He was then waived by all nine of the other NFL clubs.
