= Pete Gebrian =

American baseball player. scout, and executive (1923–2005)

- Pitcher
- Born: August 10, 1923; Bayonne, New Jersey
- Died: May 6, 2005 (aged 81); Stuart, Florida
- Batted: Right Threw: Right

MLB debut
- May 6, 1947, for the Chicago White Sox

Last MLB appearance
- September 24, 1947, for the Chicago White Sox

MLB statistics
- Win–loss record: 2–3
- Earned run average: 4.48
- Strikeouts: 17
- Stats at Baseball Reference

Teams
- Chicago White Sox (1947)

Peter Gebrian (August 10, 1923 – May 6, 2005) was an American professional baseball player, scout and front office executive. He played in Major League Baseball as a right-handed pitcher in 1947 for the Chicago White Sox. After his playing career, Gebrian became a successful scout for several major league teams.

As a player, the right-hander appeared in 27 games pitched in Major League Baseball for the 1947 Chicago White Sox. The native of Bayonne, New Jersey, stood 6 feet (1.8 m) tall and weighed 170 pounds (77 kg). He was a United States Army veteran of World War II.

Nicknamed "Gabe", Gebrian spent the entire 1947 campaign with the White Sox, appearing as a relief pitcher in all but four of the 23 games in which he took the mound. In 66⅓ total innings pitched, he allowed 61 hits and 33 bases on balls, with 17 strikeouts. He had no complete games but earned five saves coming out of the ChiSox' bullpen.

His active pitching career ended in 1949, but Gebrian remained in the game as a scout for the New York Yankees and was a longtime scout and player development official for the New York Mets, starting in the club's first season as an expansion team in 1962 and continuing into the early 1980s. Among the players he signed was Ron Swoboda. From 1975 to 1980, he served as the Mets' director of minor league operations or scouting, and also was an assistant to the club's general manager, Joe McDonald. After leaving the Mets, he was an area scout for the Pittsburgh Pirates, based in Nutley, New Jersey, into the late 1980s.
