= İlhan Koman =

Turkish sculptor (1921–1986)

- Born: June 17, 1921; Edirne, Ottoman Empire
- Died: December 30, 1986 (aged 65); Stockholm, Sweden
- Education: Istanbul State Fine Arts Academy
- Known for: Sculpture
- Notable work: Anıtkabir (Northern Reliefs); Akdeniz (sculpture)
- Spouse: Melda Kaptana
- Awards: 1952 Anıtkabir Sculpture Competition first place award 1954 Ankara State Exhibition second place award 1955 Ankara State Exhibition first place award
- Children: 5
- Website: koman.org

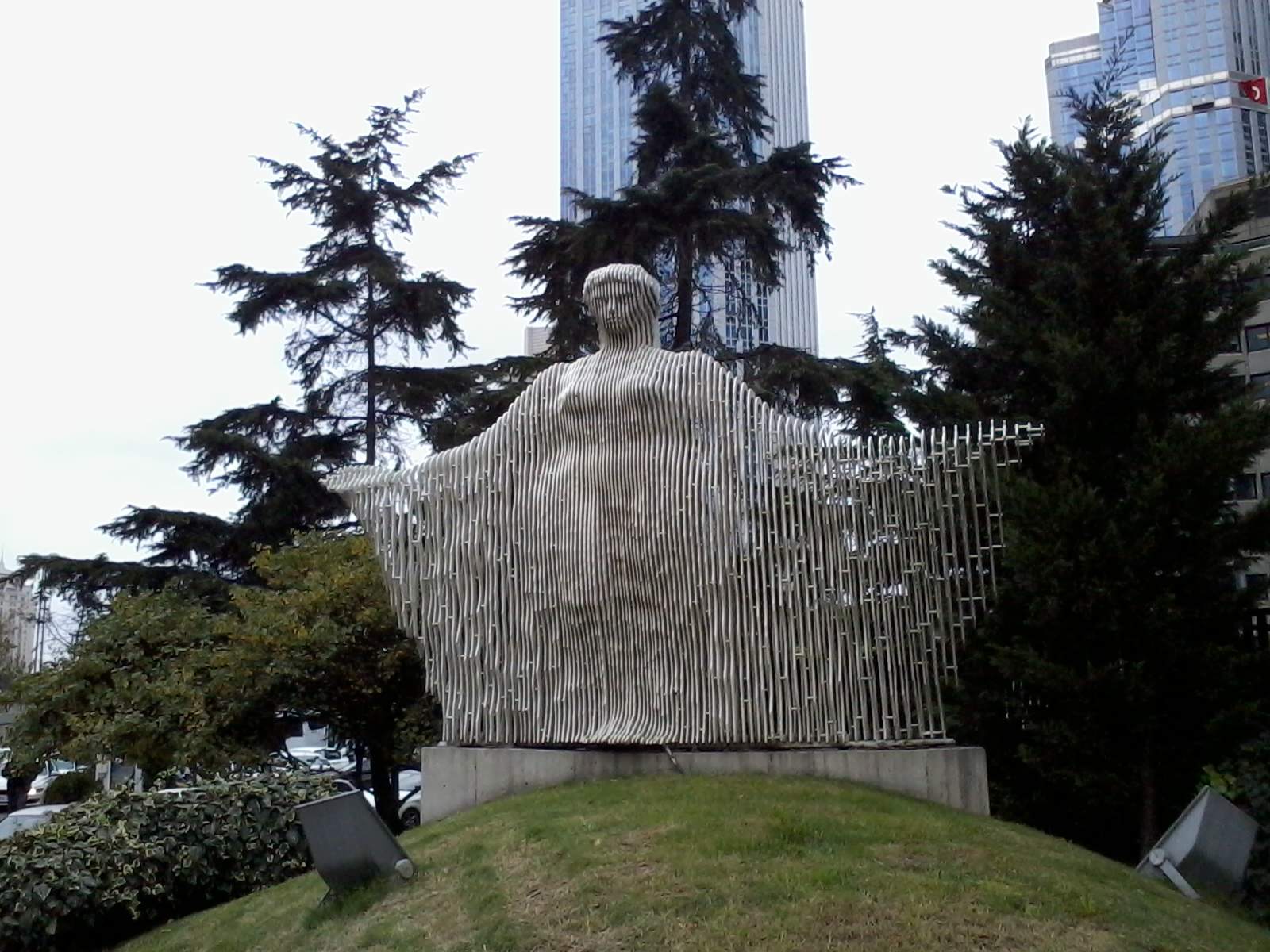
Koman's sculpture Akdeniz ("The Mediterranean") in Levent, Istanbul

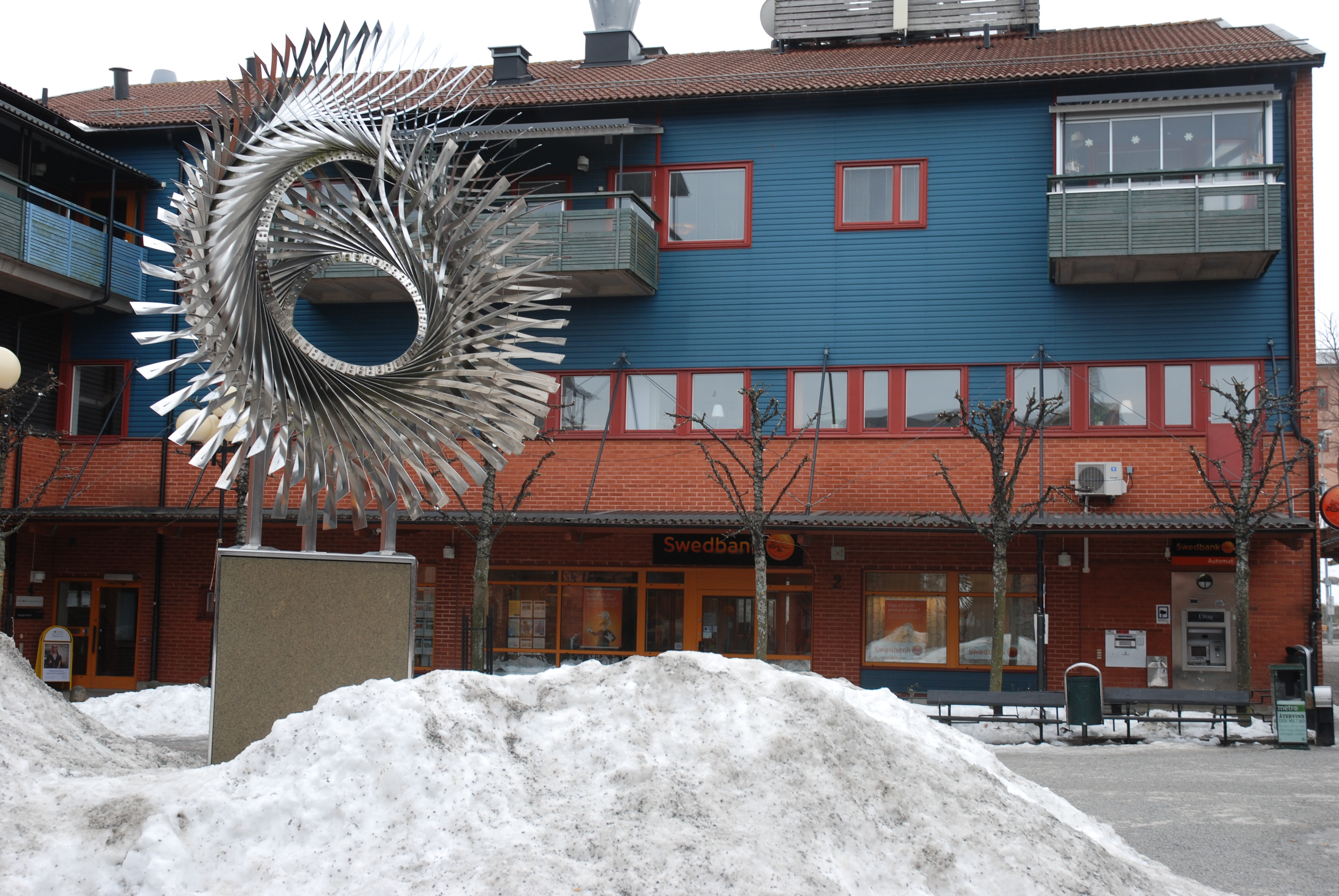
Ilhan Koman's Vattenvirveln ("Water Swirl") at Mälarö Square in Ekerö

İlhan Koman (June 17, 1921 – December 30, 1986) was a Turkish sculptor. Between 1951 and 1958, he worked at the Istanbul Fine Arts Academy, before moving to Sweden in 1959. His distinct style of mixing science and art in his works earned him a unique position among contemporary artists, for which he was referred to as the Turkish Da Vinci. His most famous and most talked about work in the field of figurative abstraction is his sculpture Akdeniz.

== Life ==
He was born on June 17, 1921, in Edirne. His father, Fuat Bey, was a doctor and farmer, and his mother was Sevinç Leman Hanım. His father's distant ancestors were villagers who, after the Battle of Mohács in 1526, were relocated from Konya to the Balkans. In the 1880s, the family emigrated (from the provinces of Ottoman Rumelia that would later become a part of Yugoslavia) to Edirne, following the Russo-Turkish War (1877–1878) and the Treaty of Berlin (1878). His maternal grandfather, Mehmet Şerafettin Aykut Bey, was a revolutionary during the reign of Sultan Abdul Hamid II and one of the founders of the Trakya Paşaeli Müdafaa-i Hukuk Cemiyeti.

He spent his childhood in Edirne's Kaleiçi district. After finishing the Edirne High School, he enrolled in the Painting Department of the Istanbul Fine Arts Academy in 1941. Upon the advice of his teachers, he transferred to the Sculpture Department a year later, as a student of Rudolf Belling, and graduated in 1945.

In 1947, he earned a state scholarship by winning the Ministry of Education's exam, and was sent to Paris, France, together with Neşet Günal, Refik Eren and Sadi Öziş. In the years 1947–1950 he studied at the Academie Julian and the École du Louvre in France. His works during his time at the Louvre were especially influenced by Mesopotamian and ancient Egyptian art. The artist, who felt a closeness to the contemporary trends in Paris, opened his first exhibition in this city in 1948. In 1951, a short time before returning to Turkey, he married Melda Kaptana and from this marriage the couple had a son.

After returning to his home country, he started his mandatory service at the Istanbul Fine Arts Academy, working there until 1958. In 1952, he won the first place with the Relief composition under the Staircase at the Honor Hall in the "Anıtkabir Sculpture Competition". Between the years 1952 and 1954, the reliefs he created in the context of this project about the Battle of Sakarya (1921) had traces of the experiences that he had gained in Paris, where he studied Mesopotamian and ancient Egyptian reliefs.

He started to work in the metal workshop established in 1953 in the academy with Sadi Öziş, Hadi Bara, Şadi Çalık and Zühtü Müridoğlu. In the same period, with the capital provided by manufacturer Mazhar Süleymangil, he set up a metal furniture workshop called "Kare Metal" with Şadi Çalık and Sadi Öziş, and designed modern furniture. Inspired by the French Groupe Espace in 1955, Ali Hadi Bara, Sadi Öziş and architect Tariq Carim founded the group "Türk Grup Espas". With this group he produced works which advocated the collaboration between painters, sculptors and architects.

His work was awarded the second place at the 1954 Ankara State Exhibition, and the first place at the 1955 Ankara State Exhibition. In 1958, he undertook the construction of the Turkish pavilion at the 1958 Brussels World's Fair. Upon the invitation of Scottish architect Ralph Erskine, whom he met during the six months they worked on the Brussels project, he went to Sweden to research forms for his architectural designs. Leaving his first wife and his job at the Istanbul Fine Arts Academy, he moved to Sweden in 1959.

In 1965 he bought the M/Y Hulda, a two-mast sailing boat built in 1905, which he restored to live and work in. He used this boat as a home and workshop until his death in 1986.

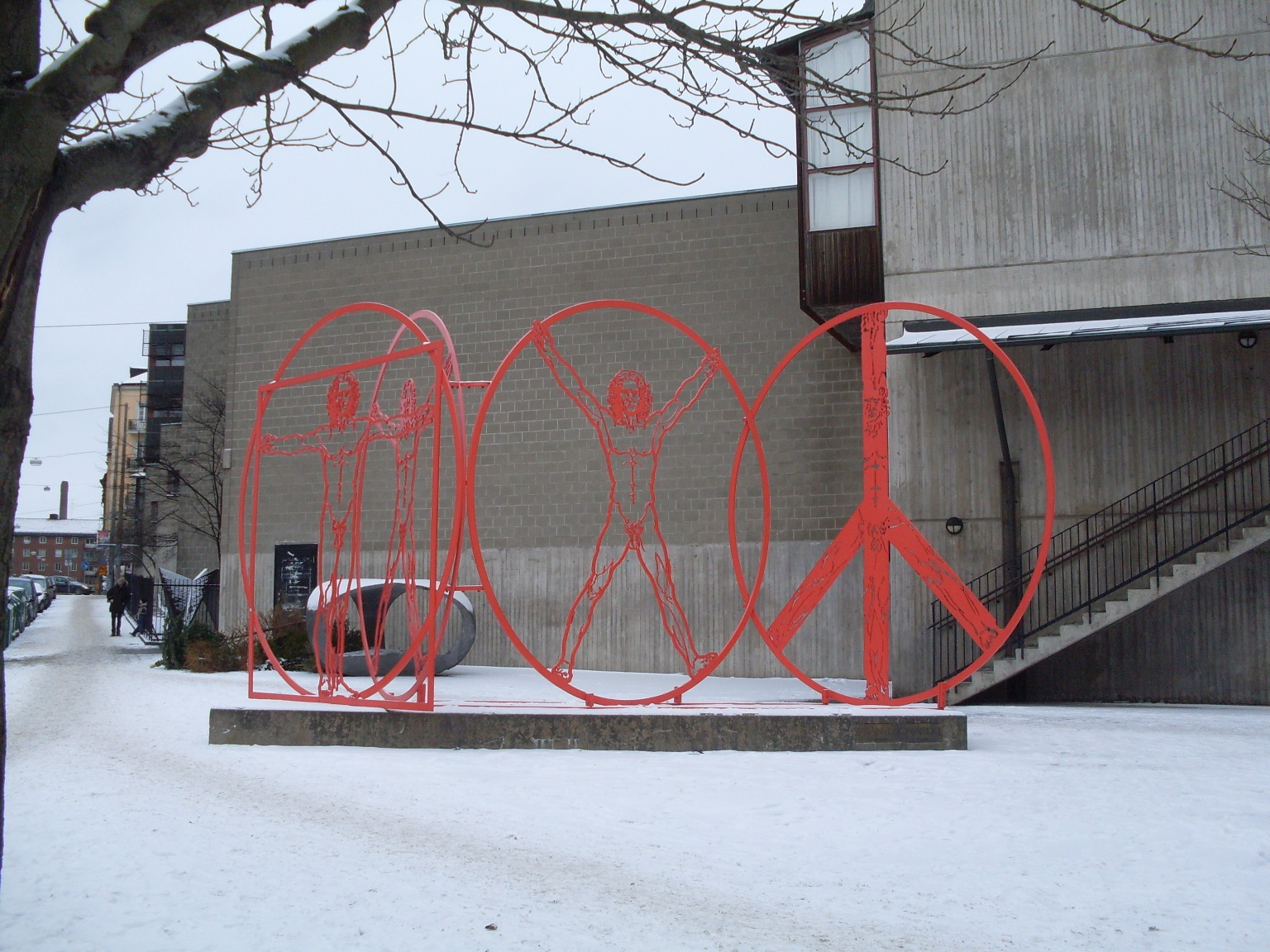
Koman's Från Leonardo ("From Leonardo") in front of the Stockholm School of Architecture

In 1967, he was accepted as a lecturer at the Stockholm School of Applied Arts. Scientific discoveries such as new geometric derivatives and windmills were registered in this period. He won the first prize in the competition for the development of an area in Sweden, Sundsvall, in 1969, and in 1970, the first place in the sculpture contest for a sculpture to be put in front of the Örebro Municipal Palace.

On December 30, 1986, he died at the age of 65 in Sweden's capital Stockholm. In line with his last will, his body was cremated and the ashes were spread in the Baltic Sea, where he spent a significant time of his life.

Koman's sculptures are found in the streets and squares of 20 cities, most of them in Stockholm. In front of the Stockholm School of Architecture, his sculpture Från Leonardo ("From Leonardo da Vinci") is one of his widely liked works. Originally located in front of the Yapı Kredi Headquarters in Levent, Istanbul, his sculpture Akdeniz (1980) is the sculptor's most well-known work in Turkey.

== Tribute ==
On 17 June 2019, Koman's 98th birthday, he was honored with a Google Doodle.
