= Ralph Hamner =

American baseball player (1916–2001)

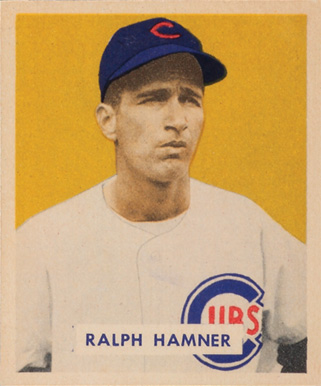
- Pitcher
- Born: September 12, 1916; Gibsland, Louisiana, U.S.
- Died: May 22, 2001 (aged 84); Little Rock, Arkansas, U.S.
- Batted: Right Threw: Right

MLB debut
- April 28, 1946, for the Chicago White Sox

Last MLB appearance
- May 18, 1949, for the Chicago Cubs

MLB statistics
- Win–loss record: 8–20
- Earned run average: 4.58
- Strikeouts: 99
- Stats at Baseball Reference

Teams
- Chicago White Sox (1946); Chicago Cubs (1947–1949)

Ralph Conant Hamner (September 12, 1916 – May 22, 2001) nicknamed "Bruz", was a professional baseball player. He was a right-handed pitcher over parts of four seasons (1946–49) with the Chicago White Sox and Chicago Cubs. For his career, he compiled an 8–20 record, with a 4.58 earned run average, and 99 strikeouts in 220 innings pitched.

He was born in Gibsland, Louisiana and later died in Little Rock, Arkansas at the age of 84.
