= Leo Wells =

American baseball player (1917–2006)

- Shortstop/Third baseman
- Born: July 18, 1917; Kansas City, Kansas, U.S.
- Died: June 23, 2006 (aged 88); Saint Paul, Minnesota, U.S.
- Batted: Right Threw: Right

MLB debut
- April 16, 1942, for the Chicago White Sox

Last MLB appearance
- August 20, 1946, for the Chicago White Sox

MLB statistics
- Batting average: .190
- Home runs: 2
- RBI: 15
- Stats at Baseball Reference

Teams
- Chicago White Sox (1942, 1946)

Career highlights and awards

Leo Donald Wells (July 18, 1917 – June 23, 2006) was an American professional baseball player who played in 80 games for the Chicago White Sox in two seasons separated by a three-year stint in the military during World War II.

An infielder standing 5' 9" and weighing 170 lb., he split his time between third base and shortstop. At the latter, he accepted 38 chances in 14 games without making an error for a 1.000 fielding percentage.

In his first season, he played 35 games, batting .194 with one home run and four RBIs. Rejoining the ChiSox in 1946, he hit another home run and drove in 11 runs, batting .189 over 45 games.

Wells died on June 23, 2006, in St. Paul, Minnesota.
