= Gene Desautels =

American baseball player (1907–1994)

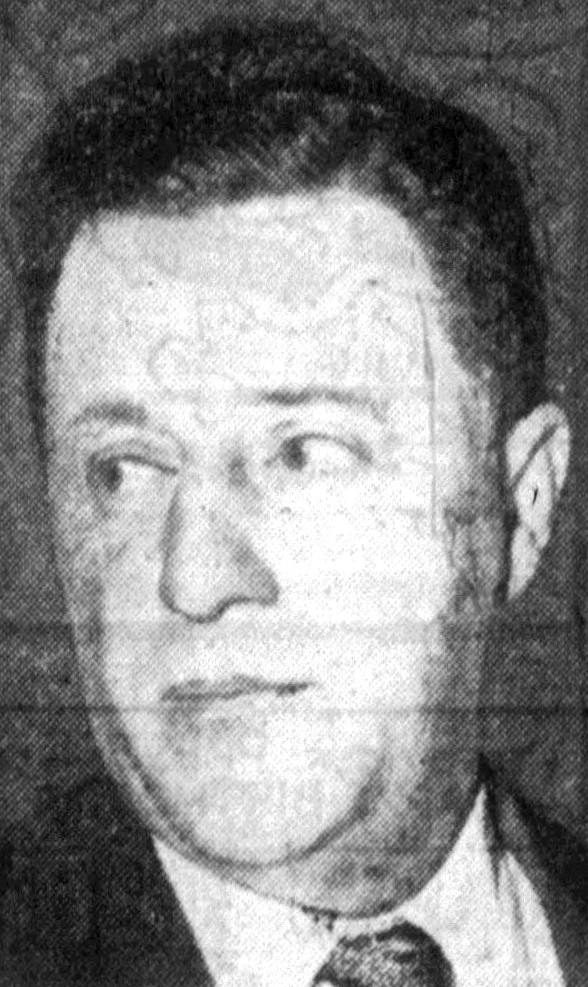
- Desautels, circa 1953
- Catcher
- Born: June 13, 1907; Worcester, Massachusetts, U.S.
- Died: November 5, 1994 (aged 87); Flint, Michigan, U.S.
- Batted: Right Threw: Right

MLB debut
- June 22, 1930, for the Detroit Tigers

Last MLB appearance
- September 22, 1946, for the Philadelphia Athletics

MLB statistics
- Batting average: .233
- Home runs: 3
- Runs batted in: 187
- Stats at Baseball Reference

Teams
- Detroit Tigers (1930–1933); Boston Red Sox (1937–1940); Cleveland Indians (1941–1943, 1945); Philadelphia Athletics (1946)

Eugene Abraham "Red" Desautels (June 13, 1907 – November 5, 1994) was an American professional baseball player. He played most of his Major League Baseball career as a backup catcher with four teams between 1930 and 1946. Desautels was a light-hitting player, but was known for his superior defensive ability as a catcher, and for his handling pitching staffs. After his playing career, he served as a manager in minor league baseball.

== Playing career ==
Born in Worcester, Massachusetts, to French Canadian parents, Desautels was a protégé of Crusaders coach Jack Barry during his playing days at the College of the Holy Cross. After graduating with a bachelor's degree in philosophy, he went directly to the major leagues, making his debut with the Detroit Tigers on June 22, 1930 at the age of 23. He served as a reserve catcher for the Detroit Tigers, playing behind Ray Hayworth and veteran Muddy Ruel. When catcher Mickey Cochrane joined the Tigers as a player-manager in 1934, Desautels was sent to the minor leagues to play for the Toledo Mud Hens. He then spent two seasons in the Pacific Coast League with the Hollywood Stars and San Diego Padres.

Desautels came back to the major leagues in 1937, playing for the Boston Red Sox as a back up to Rick Ferrell. When Ferrell was traded to the Washington Senators in June that year, Desautels became starting catcher for the Red Sox. Desautels enjoyed his most productive season with Boston in 1938, when he posted career-highs in batting average (.291), home runs (2), runs batted in (48), runs (47), doubles (16), and games played (108). However, his offense declined in 1939 and he was traded to the Cleveland Indians for Frankie Pytlak after the 1940 season.

As a member of the Indians, Desautels played as a reserve catcher behind Rollie Hemsley. At the beginning of the 1943 season, Indians' manager, Lou Boudreau, named Desautels as the Indians starting catcher, but by the middle of the year he was replaced by Buddy Rosar, who was hitting above .300. He entered the United States Marine Corps in February 1944 and was discharged in July 1945 at the age of 38, losing two years from his baseball career. He rejoined the Indians in August 1945 but, saw little playing time and was released in September of that year. He was hired by Connie Mack to play for the Philadelphia Athletics in 1946, where he once again played as a reserve catcher behind Buddy Rosar. Desautels retired as a player at the end of the 1946 season, at the age of 39.

Joe Cronin, the former American League President, was once asked if he had ever seen a player win an argument or an umpire change his decision. Cronin said, "Gene Desautels, then a rookie, young catcher with Detroit, was a cocky young fellow and was giving umpire Cal Hubbard a hard time. On a play at second, Desautels slid in and Hubbard called him out as he peered through a cloud of dust. I think Hubbard was hoping Desautels would complain so he could throw him out of the game, too. Desautels said sweetly, 'You can't call me out.' Hubbard blustered, 'Oh no? Why not?' 'Because,' Desautels said, 'I'm sitting on the ball.'"

== Career statistics ==
In a thirteen-year major league career, Desautels compiled a major league career batting average of .233, including 461 hits, three home runs and 187 runs batted in. At the time of his retirement, his .989 career fielding percentage was the second highest by a catcher in major league history behind Frankie Pytlak. He led American League catchers in 1937 with a .993 fielding percentage and a 5.69 range factor. Desautels allowed only 19 passed balls in his career, the third fewest all-time among major league catchers.

== Managing career ==
Following his playing retirement, Desautels managed the Williamsport Tigers of the Eastern League for three years from 1947 to 1949. He then managed the Class-A Flint Arrows, a Tigers farm team. In 1951, he managed the Double A Little Rock Travelers to their first Southern Association pennant in nine years. Desautels moved on to manage the Indianapolis Indians in 1952, and the Triple-A Sacramento Solons from 1953 to 1954. Later in life, he served as a special counselor for Flint, Michigan high schools. He was inducted into the Holy Cross Athletics Hall of Fame in 1981.

Desautels died in Flint, Michigan, at the age of 87.
