= Akdeniz (sculpture) =

Statue by İlhan Koman

- The Mediterranean
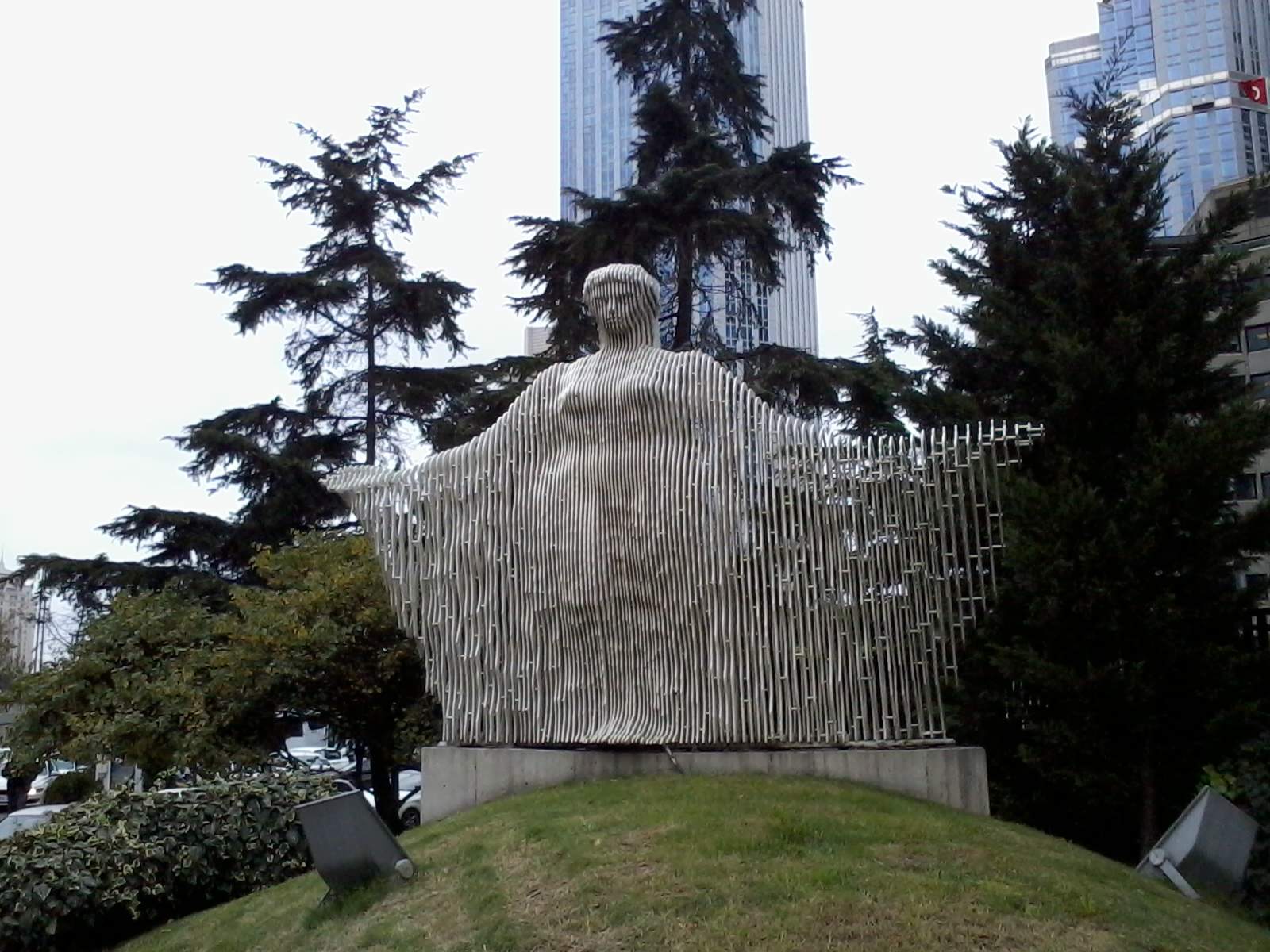
- Akdeniz by İlhan Koman
- Artist: İlhan Koman
- Year: 1980; 46 years ago
- Medium: Sheet metal
- Weight: 4.5 tonnes
- Location: Istanbul, Turkey
- Owner: Yapı Kredi

Akdeniz (1980) is a monumental sculpture by Turkish sculptor İlhan Koman, originally erected at Büyükdere Avenue in Levent, Istanbul, in 1980. It is currently located at the Yapı Kredi Culture Center on İstiklal Avenue.

== Description and history ==
One of Istanbul's most well-known sculptures, it is a figure of a woman with open arms formed out of 112 equally spaced 12-millimetre-thick (0.47 in) sheet metal strips.

When the sculptor attempted to explain the feeling of a human hug, he thought of the Mediterranean Sea, which he said was the reason behind the name Akdeniz, the Turkish name of the Mediterranean. The sculpture's design, which is based on a paper cutting and folding technique, weighs 4.5 tonnes. In 1981, the sculpture earned İlhan Koman the Sedat Simavi Foundation Visual Arts Award.

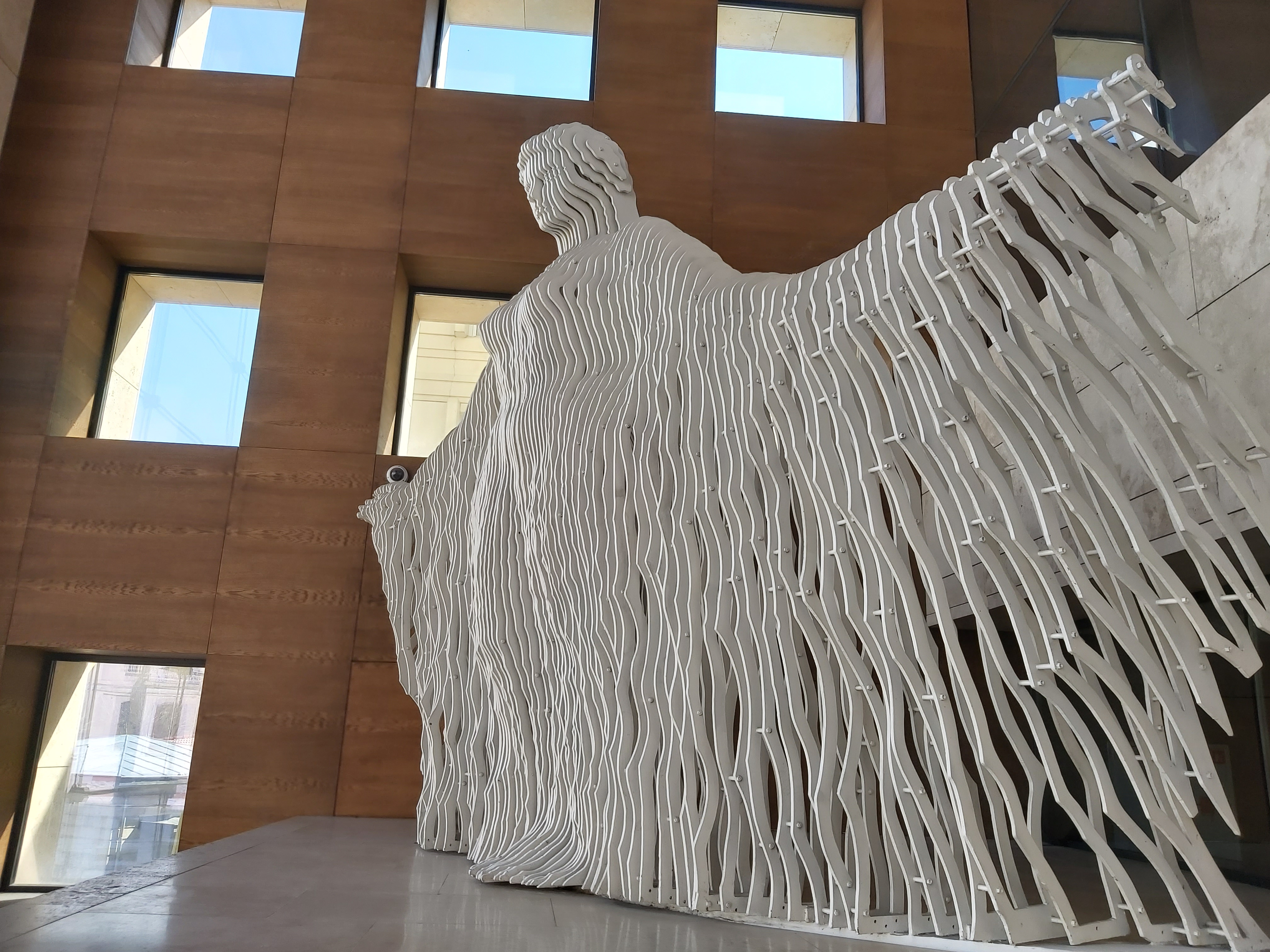
The sculpture at the Yapı Kredi Culture Centre on İstiklal Avenue

The sculpture, which was requested by the insurance company Halk Sigorta (later renamed as Yapı Kredi Sigorta), was initially erected in front of the company's headquarters on Büyükdere Avenue in Levent. In 2005, the sculpture was temporarily moved to Galatasaray Square for İlhan Koman's exhibition; and some time later, with Halk Sigorta transferring to Yapı Kredi Sigorta, was placed in front of the Yapı Kredi Bank Headquarters in Levent. People protesting Israel's invasion of the Gaza Strip during the 2014 Israel–Gaza conflict ravaged the sculpture, which was situated next to the Israeli Consulate in Levent, Istanbul. After these events, the residents of Edirne started a petition to bring the sculpture to their city; while Antalya's Muratpaşa district also wanted to house the sculpture in their district. The sculpture was restored and moved to the Yapı Kredi Culture Centre building on İstiklal Avenue in 2017.

== See also ==
- List of public art in Istanbul
