= Emmett O'Neill =

American baseball player (1918–1993)

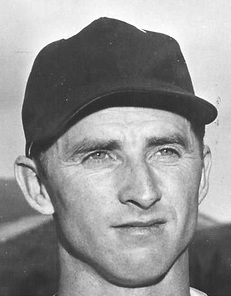
- O'Neill, circa 1947
- Pitcher
- Born: January 13, 1918; San Mateo, California, US
- Died: October 11, 1993 (aged 75); Sparks, Nevada, US
- Batted: Right Threw: Right

MLB debut
- August 3, 1943, for the Boston Red Sox

Last MLB appearance
- June 5, 1946, for the Chicago White Sox

MLB statistics
- Win–loss record: 15–26
- Earned run average: 4.76
- Strikeouts: 144
- Stats at Baseball Reference

Teams
- Boston Red Sox (1943–1945); Chicago Cubs (1946); Chicago White Sox (1946)

Robert Emmett O'Neill (January 13, 1918 – October 11, 1993) was an American professional baseball player and former Major League Baseball (MLB) pitcher. He played with the Boston Red Sox, Chicago Cubs and the Chicago White Sox. He batted and threw right-handed during his baseball career. He attended college at Saint Mary's College of California.

== Career ==
O'Neill made his Major League debut with the Boston Red Sox on August 3, 1943. He played his final game on June 5, 1946, with the Chicago White Sox. He had two career shutouts and an ERA of 4.76.

O'Neill died on October 11, 1993, in Sparks, Nevada at the age of 75 from coronary artery complications. He is buried at St Michael Church, Marquette, Michigan.
