= Jake Caulfield =

American baseball player (1917-1986)

- Shortstop
- Born: November 23, 1917; Los Angeles, California, U.S.
- Died: December 16, 1986 (aged 69); San Francisco, California, U.S.
- Batted: Right Threw: Right

MLB debut
- April 24, 1946, for the Philadelphia Athletics

Last MLB appearance
- August 25, 1946, for the Philadelphia Athletics

MLB statistics
- Batting average: .277
- Home runs: 0
- Runs batted in: 10
- Stats at Baseball Reference

Teams
- Philadelphia Athletics (1946)

John Joseph "Jake" Caulfield (November 23, 1917 – December 16, 1986) was an American professional baseball player whose career lasted for six seasons (1943–1948), including one campaign (1946) in Major League Baseball as a shortstop for the Philadelphia Athletics. Born in Los Angeles, he threw and batted right-handed, stood 5 feet 11 inches (1.80 m) tall and weighed 170 pounds (77 kg).

After attending the University of San Francisco, Caulfield began his pro career during World War II at the relatively advanced age of 25 for the Oakland Oaks of the top-level Pacific Coast League, appearing in 152 games in 1943. He would be the Oaks' regular shortstop for three seasons, through 1945, until his acquisition by the Athletics for 1946. In his lone MLB season, Caulfield appeared in 44 games, including 31 games at shortstop and one at third base. In 94 at bats, he registered 26 hits, including eight doubles, and he scored 13 runs. He was the club's third-most-used shortstop, behind Pete Suder and Jack Wallaesa.

In Charlie Metro's autobiography, this is what he wrote about the 1946 trade that brought Jake Caulfield from the Oakland Oaks to the Philadelphia Athletics: "The Athletics needed a shortstop, so they traded Charlie Gassaway, Ed Busch, and me to Oakland for Jake Caulfield, all the way across the continent in the Pacific Coast League. After I had hit 3 home runs! I pleaded with Mr. Mack, 'My gosh, Mr. Mack, you couldn't have sent me any farther.' I was on my way west. Every time I'd see Jake Caulfield, who later retired from the San Francisco police force, at spring training at Phoenix, I'd tell him, 'I'm going to punch you right now.' He lasted only one year with the Athletics. I said, 'If you'd quit one year sooner, I'd still have been in the big leagues.' And we'd have a laugh over that."

Caulfield returned to the minor leagues for his final two professional seasons at the Triple-A level, playing for the Sacramento Solons and Columbus Red Birds in 1947 and for the Rochester Red Wings and San Diego Padres in 1948. He died on December 16, 1986. He was interred at Holy Cross Cemetery in Colma, California.
