= Pat Cooper (baseball) =

American baseball player (1917–1993)

- First baseman / Pitcher
- Born: November 26, 1917; Albemarle, North Carolina, U.S.
- Died: March 15, 1993 (aged 75); Charlotte, North Carolina, U.S.
- Batted: Right Threw: Right

MLB debut
- May 11, 1946, for the Philadelphia Athletics

Last MLB appearance
- September 6, 1947, for the Philadelphia Athletics

MLB statistics
- Batting average: .250
- Home runs: 0
- Runs batted in: 3
- Win–loss record: 0–0
- Innings pitched: 1
- Earned run average: 0.00
- Stats at Baseball Reference

Teams
- Philadelphia Athletics (1946–1947)

Orge Patterson Cooper (November 26, 1917 – March 15, 1993) was an American professional baseball player. He played parts of two seasons in Major League Baseball, 1946 and 1947, for the Philadelphia Athletics. Cooper's minor league career spanned fifteen seasons, from 1936 until 1950.

In 1946, Cooper appeared in one game as a pitcher, pitching one scoreless inning in a game on May 11. In 1947, he appeared in 13 games, one as a first baseman and the rest as a pinch hitter.
