= Joe Smaza =

American baseball player (1923–1979)

- Outfielder
- Born: July 7, 1923; Detroit, Michigan, U.S.
- Died: May 30, 1979 (aged 55); Royal Oak, Michigan, U.S.
- Batted: Left Threw: Left

MLB debut
- September 18, 1946, for the Chicago White Sox

Last MLB appearance
- September 21, 1946, for the Chicago White Sox

MLB statistics
- Games played: 2
- At bats: 5
- Hits: 1
- Stats at Baseball Reference

Teams
- Chicago White Sox (1946)

Joseph Paul Smaza (July 7, 1923 – May 30, 1979) was an American professional baseball outfielder who briefly played for the Chicago White Sox in 1946. A native of Detroit, he threw and batted left-handed, stood 5 feet 11 inches (1.80 m) tall and weighed 175 pounds (79 kg).

Smaza attended Western Michigan University and served in the United States Navy during World War II. His pro career began after the war, and lasted into 1950.

He was recalled by the White Sox in September 1946 after playing for the season with the Double-A Shreveport Sports. In his debut game September 18, he collected his lone MLB hit, a single of Tiny Bonham of the New York Yankees at Comiskey Park. He also scored the first of his two big-league runs in a 9–7 Chicago victory, and handled no chances in right field over the full nine innings. Three days later, he pinch ran for veteran Hal Trosky and scored his second MLB run in an 11–10 win over the St. Louis Browns at Sportsman's Park. He batted .200 (one-for-five) and scored two runs in his two games in the majors, without a run batted in.
