= Ernest Gross (footballer) =

French footballer (1902–1986)

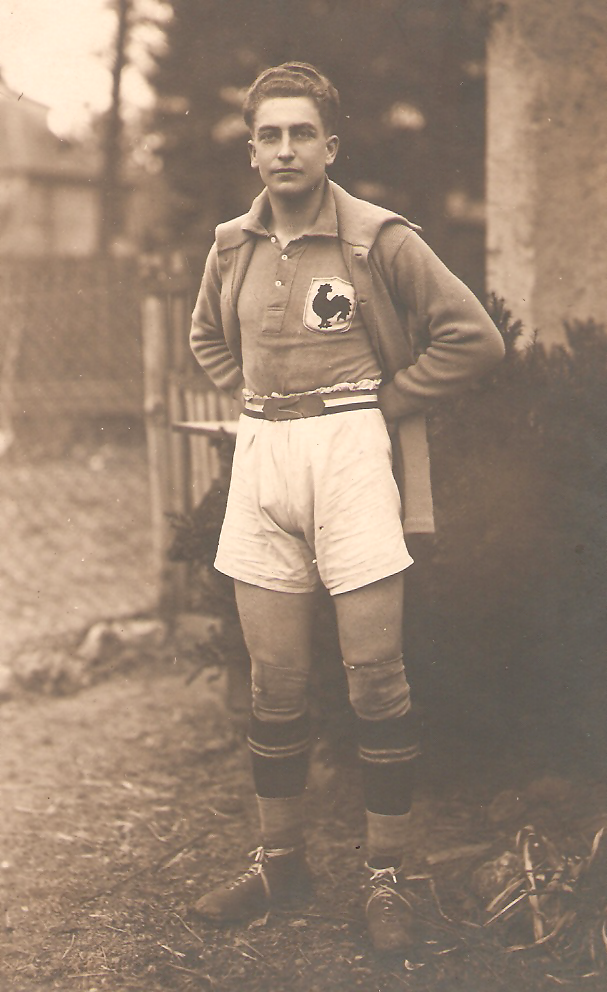

Personal information
- Date of birth: 22 December 1902
- Place of birth: Strasbourg, France
- Date of death: 8 December 1986 (aged 83)
- Place of death: Strasbourg, France

International career
Years	Team	Apps	(Gls)
1924–1925	France	5	(1)

Ernest Gross (22 December 1902 – 8 December 1986) was a French footballer. He played in five matches for the France national football team in 1924 and 1925.
