= Ralph Hodgin =

American baseball player (1915–2011)

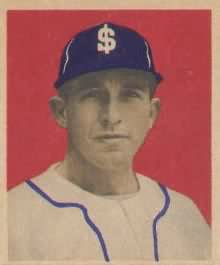
- Hodgin in 1949
- Outfielder / Third baseman
- Born: February 10, 1915; Greensboro, North Carolina, U.S.
- Died: October 4, 2011 (aged 96); Burlington, North Carolina, U.S.
- Batted: Left Threw: Right

MLB debut
- April 19, 1939, for the Boston Bees

Last MLB appearance
- October 3, 1948, for the Chicago White Sox

MLB statistics
- Batting average: .285
- Home runs: 4
- Runs batted in: 188
- Stats at Baseball Reference

Teams
- Boston Bees (1939); Chicago White Sox (1943–1944, 1946–1948)

Elmer Ralph Hodgin (February 10, 1915 – October 4, 2011) was an American outfielder and third baseman who played in Major League Baseball between 1939 and 1948. He batted left-handed and threw right-handed. He was born in Greensboro, North Carolina.

Listed at 5' 10", 170 lb., Hodgin reached the majors in 1939 with the Boston Bees, splitting the season between them and the Hartford Bees of the Eastern League. The next two seasons were spent with Hartford, and in 1942, Hodgin played for the San Francisco Seals of the Pacific Coast League. In 1943 he joined the Chicago White Sox and hit a career-high .314. Hodgin had another strong season in 1944 and hit .295, but the 1945 season was spent in the military. Afterwards, he rejoined the White Sox in 1946. Then, in 1947 he suffered a concussion after he was hit on the skull by a pitch from future Hall of Fame pitcher Hal Newhouser. After that Hodgin lost some of his aggressiveness at the plate, hitting .266 in 114 games for the Sox in 1948, his last major league season. He continued to play for several more seasons in the Pacific Coast League and then the Carolina League.

In a six-season big-league career, Hodgin was a .285 hitter (481-for-1,689) with four home runs and 188 RBI in 530 games, including 198 runs, 79 doubles, 24 triples, and seven stolen bases. A hard-to-strike-out hitter, he posted a solid 1.54 BB/K (97-to-63). He died on October 4, 2011, in Burlington, North Carolina.
