= Taffy Wright =

American baseball player (1911–1981)

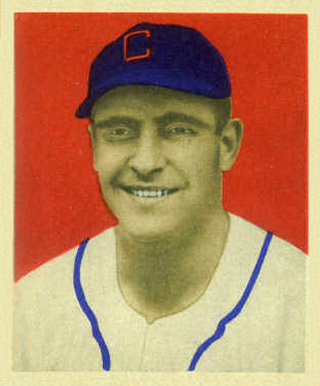
- Right fielder
- Born: August 10, 1911; Tabor City, North Carolina, U.S.
- Died: October 22, 1981 (aged 70); Orlando, Florida, U.S.
- Batted: Left Threw: Right

MLB debut
- April 18, 1938, for the Washington Senators

Last MLB appearance
- September 16, 1949, for the Philadelphia Athletics

MLB statistics
- Batting average: .311
- Home runs: 38
- Runs batted in: 553
- Stats at Baseball Reference

Teams
- Washington Senators (1938–1939); Chicago White Sox (1940–1942, 1946–1948); Philadelphia Athletics (1949)

Taft Shedron "Taffy" Wright (August 10, 1911 – October 22, 1981) was an American professional baseball player. He played nine seasons in Major League Baseball from 1938 to 1949, primarily as a right fielder.

== Early life ==
Wright was born in Tabor City, North Carolina. He signed a minor league contract with Charlotte of the Piedmont League in 1933. He was promoted to Class A in 1934 and then to Class AA in 1935. For 1936 and 1937, he played for Chattanooga.

== Major league career ==
Wright's first two major league years were with the Washington Senators. He made a splash in his rookie season, batting .350. However, because Wright had just 263 at bats in 100 games, the American League awarded the official batting title to Jimmie Foxx, who had hit .349 in more than twice as many plate appearances. Though he followed up his rookie year by batting .309 in the second, the Senators traded him to the Chicago White Sox in the 1939 offseason, in a deal for Gee Walker.

Wright played the bulk of his career with the White Sox, recording over 100 hits every year and topping .300 four more times. He played his last season in 1949 for the Philadelphia Athletics. His career batting average was .311 (1115-for-3583) with 465 runs, 38 home runs and 553 RBI in 1029 major league games. On July 3, 1940, Wright became the first White Sox player to hit a pinch-hit grand slam.

He is ranked in the top 150 outfielders of all time and, as of April 2014, was ranked 75th in career at bats to strike outs ratio. Wright also led, or was among the leaders, in right fielder defensive statistics for most of his career. He was known to regularly appear in The Sporting News.

== Military career ==
Wright's major league career was interrupted by World War II, serving in the United States Army from 1942 to 1945 in the Pacific Theater of Operations. He was called to military service in August 1942; the White Sox replaced him with Bill Mueller. While serving as a sergeant during the war, Wright played on several military baseball teams, and was selected as an Army Air Force All-Star in 1945.

== Taffy Wright Rule ==
In his rookie season, Wright had the highest batting average in the league, although Jimmie Foxx was awarded the title as Wright was considered a part-time player. This led to the retroactively named Taffy Wright Rule. The rule, inconsistently applied, required that the winner of the batting title play at least 100 games in the field to be eligible for the title.

== Later years ==
Wright continued to play minor league baseball until he was in his mid-forties. Wright also served as a manager in the minor leagues. He is buried in Meadowbrook Cemetery in Lumberton, North Carolina.
