= Mike Tresh =

American baseball player (1914–1966)

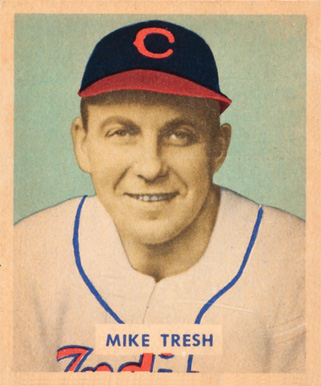
- Catcher
- Born: February 23, 1914; Hazleton, Pennsylvania, U.S.
- Died: October 4, 1966 (aged 52); Detroit, Michigan, U.S.
- Batted: Right Threw: Right

MLB debut
- September 4, 1938, for the Chicago White Sox

Last MLB appearance
- September 25, 1949, for the Cleveland Indians

MLB statistics
- Batting average: .249
- Home runs: 2
- Runs batted in: 297
- Stats at Baseball Reference

Teams
- Chicago White Sox (1938–1948); Cleveland Indians (1949)

Career highlights and awards
- All-Star (1945)

Michael Tresh Jr (February 23, 1914 – October 4, 1966) was an American professional baseball catcher, who played in Major League Baseball (MLB) for the Chicago White Sox (1938–1948) and Cleveland Indians (1949). Tresh batted and threw right-handed. His son, Tom, also played in the big leagues, from 1961 to 1969.

In a 12-season career, Tresh posted a .249 batting average with two home runs and 297 RBI in 1027 games played. His best season was 1940, when he batted .281 with 64 RBIs, 62 runs, and 135 hits—all career-highs. Tresh was durable enough to catch all 150 White Sox games in 1945, and is just one of three 20th-century catchers to catch every one of an MLB team's games in a season. The others are Frankie Hayes (Philadelphia Phillies) and Ray Mueller (Cincinnati Reds), each with 155 games caught in 1944.

After having suffered from a heart attack earlier in the year, Tresh died from cancer at the age of 52 in Detroit, Michigan, and is interred at Michigan Memorial Park in Flat Rock, Michigan.

== Early life ==
Tresh was born in Hazleton, Pennsylvania to Michael Tresh, a Galician immigrant, and Mary, a Pennsylvania native. He grew up with three sisters; Anna, Katherine, and Margaret. In the 1920s, his family moved from Pennsylvania to Detroit, and Michael worked as a truck driver before becoming a baseball player. In the late 1930s, he moved in with his wife Doris's family in Allen Park, where his wife gave birth to their son, Thomas Michael Tresh.

== See also ==
- List of second-generation Major League Baseball players
