= George Dickey (baseball) =

American baseball player (1915–1976)

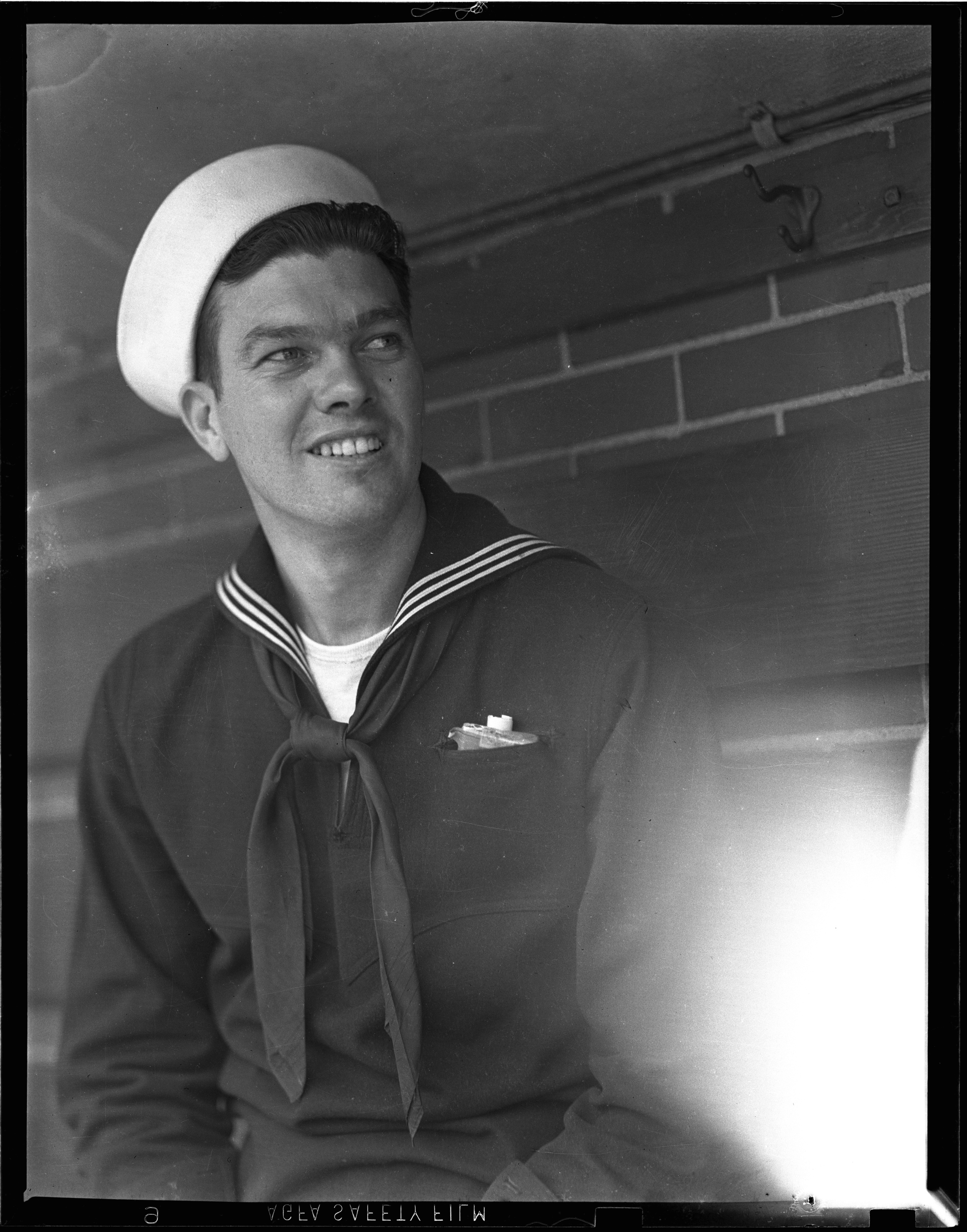
- Dickey during his time in the United States Navy ca 1940's
- Catcher
- Born: July 10, 1915; Kensett, Arkansas, U.S.
- Died: June 16, 1976 (aged 60); DeWitt, Arkansas, U.S.
- Batted: Both Threw: Right

MLB debut
- September 21, 1935, for the Boston Red Sox

Last MLB appearance
- September 27, 1947, for the Chicago White Sox

MLB statistics
- Batting average: .204
- Home runs: 4
- Runs batted in: 54
- Stats at Baseball Reference

Teams
- Boston Red Sox (1935–1936); Chicago White Sox (1941–1942, 1946–1947)

George Willard Dickey [Skeets] (July 10, 1915 – June 16, 1976) was an American professional baseball backup catcher in Major League Baseball who played for two different teams between 1935 and 1947. Listed at 6 ft 5 in (1.96 m), 180 lb., Dickey was a switch-hitter and threw right-handed. He was the younger brother of Hall of Famer Bill Dickey.

A native of Kensett, Arkansas, Dickey entered the majors in 1935 with the Boston Red Sox, playing for them until 1936 before joining the Chicago White Sox (1941–42, 1946–47). He was one of many major leaguers who saw his baseball career interrupted when he joined the US Navy during World War II (1943–45). His most productive season came with the 1947 White Sox, when he appeared in a career-high 83 games while hitting .223 with one home run, six doubles, and 27 runs batted in.

In a six-season career, Dickey was a .204 hitter (101-for-494) with four home runs and 54 RBI in 226 games, including 36 runs, 12 doubles, and four stolen bases. Dickey married Mildred “Millie” Allen Dickey and had three children; Mary Allen, Joye, and William. Dickey lived in Little Rock Arkansas with his wife, Millie and three children. Dickey was the CEO at Stephen's Investments in Little Rock Arkansas. Dickey died in DeWitt, Arkansas, at the age of 60.
