= Jack Wallaesa =

American baseball player (1919–1986)

- Shortstop
- Born: August 31, 1919; Easton, Pennsylvania
- Died: December 27, 1986 (aged 67); Easton, Pennsylvania
- Batted: Both Threw: Right

MLB debut
- September 22, 1940, for the Philadelphia Athletics

Last MLB appearance
- August 3, 1948, for the Chicago White Sox

MLB statistics
- Batting average: .205
- Home runs: 15
- Runs batted in: 61
- Stats at Baseball Reference

Teams
- Philadelphia Athletics (1940, 1942, 1946); Chicago White Sox (1947–1948)

John Wallaesa (August 31, 1919 – December 27, 1986) was an American professional baseball shortstop. He played in Major League Baseball (MLB) for five seasons with the Philadelphia Athletics in 1940, 1942, and 1946, and the Chicago White Sox from 1947 to 1948.

Wallaesa served in the United States Army in Italy and France during World War II. He spent his post-baseball years working at a Pennsylvania clothing store until retiring in 1981.
