= 1941 Boston Red Sox season =

Major League Baseball season

1941 Boston Red Sox
- League: American League
- Ballpark: Fenway Park
- City: Boston, Massachusetts
- Record: 84–70 (.545)
- League place: 2nd
- Owners: Tom Yawkey
- President: Tom Yawkey
- General managers: Eddie Collins
- Managers: Joe Cronin
- Radio: WAAB (Jim Britt, Tom Hussey)
- Stats: ESPN.com; Baseball Reference

The 1941 Boston Red Sox season was the 41st season in the franchise's Major League Baseball history. The Red Sox finished second in the American League (AL) with a record of 84 wins and 70 losses, 17 games behind the New York Yankees, who went on to win the 1941 World Series.

The Red Sox featured five future Hall of Famers: player-manager Joe Cronin, Bobby Doerr, Jimmie Foxx, Lefty Grove, and Ted Williams.

== Offseason ==
- Prior to 1941 season: Virgil Stallcup was signed as an amateur free agent by the Red Sox.

== Regular season ==
Williams was one of the biggest stories of the 1941 major league season, becoming, as of 2022, the last player to bat .400 (batting .406) in a full season. He led an offense that scored the most runs of any major league team. During the season, Williams reached base safely in 69 consecutive games.

=== Transactions ===
- September 8: The Red Sox announce that they have purchased shortstop Johnny Pesky from the Louisville Colonels and shortstop Eddie Pellagrini from the San Diego Padres of the Pacific Coast League.

=== Season standings ===
American League
Team	W	L	Pct.	GB	Home	Road
New York Yankees	101	53	.656	—	51‍–‍26	50‍–‍27
Boston Red Sox	84	70	.545	17	47‍–‍30	37‍–‍40
Chicago White Sox	77	77	.500	24	38‍–‍39	39‍–‍38
Cleveland Indians	75	79	.487	26	42‍–‍35	33‍–‍44
Detroit Tigers	75	79	.487	26	43‍–‍34	32‍–‍45
St. Louis Browns	70	84	.455	31	40‍–‍37	30‍–‍47
Washington Senators	70	84	.455	31	40‍–‍37	30‍–‍47
Philadelphia Athletics	64	90	.416	37	36‍–‍41	28‍–‍49

=== Record vs. opponents ===
1941 American League record Sources:
Team	BOS	CWS	CLE	DET	NYY	PHA	SLB	WSH
Boston	—	16–6	9–13	11–11	9–13–1	16–6	9–13	14–8
Chicago	6–16	—	17–5	12–10–1	8–14	10–12	11–11–1	13–9
Cleveland	13–9	5–17	—	10–12	7–15	15–7	13–9–1	12–10
Detroit	11–11	10–12–1	12–10	—	11–11	13–9	11–11	7–15
New York	13–9–1	14–8	15–7	11–11	—	14–8	18–4	16–6–1
Philadelphia	6–16	12–10	7–15	9–13	8–14	—	11–11	11–11
St. Louis	13–9	11–11–1	9–13–1	11–11	4–18	11–11	—	11–11–1
Washington	8–14	9–13	10–12	15–7	6–16–1	11–11	11–11–1	—

=== Opening Day lineup ===
7	Dom DiMaggio	CF
8	Lou Finney	RF
12	Pete Fox	LF
3	Jimmie Foxx	1B
4	Joe Cronin	SS
1	Bobby Doerr	2B
5	Jim Tabor	3B
2	Frankie Pytlak	C
10	Lefty Grove	P

=== Roster ===
1941 Boston Red Sox
Roster
Pitchers: 16 Emerson Dickman; 17 Joe Dobson; 23 Bill Fleming; 10 Lefty Grove; 19 Mickey Harris; 24 Herb Hash; 29 Tex Hughson; 20 Earl Johnson; 34 Oscar Judd; 28 Dick Newsome; 24 Nels Potter; 15 Woody Rich; 25 Mike Ryba; 27 Charlie Wagner; 18 Jack Wilson	Catchers: 11 Johnny Peacock; 2 Frankie Pytlak; Infielders: 14 Tom Carey; 4 Joe Cronin; 1 Bobby Doerr; 16 Al Flair; 3 Jimmie Foxx; 6 Odell Hale; 26 Skeeter Newsome; 5 Jim Tabor	Outfielders: 7 Dom DiMaggio; 8 Lou Finney; 12 Pete Fox; 21 Stan Spence; 9 Ted Williams; Other batters: 37 Paul Campbell	Manager: 4 Joe Cronin; Coaches: 22 Moe Berg (First base); 30 Tom Daly (Third base); 31 Frank Shellenback (Pitching)

== Player stats ==
Note: Stats in brackets are derived from Retrosheet which differ from official MLB stats.

=== Batting ===
= Indicates team leader

= Indicates league leader

==== Starters by position ====
Abbreviations: Pos=Position; GP=Games played; AB=At bats; R=Runs; H=Hits; 2B=Doubles; 3B=Triples; HR=Home runs; RBI=Runs batted in; BB=Walks; AVG=Batting average; OBP=On base percentage; SLG=Slugging percentage

Pos	Player	GP	AB	R	H	2B	3B	HR	RBI	BB	AVG	OBP	SLG	References
C	Frankie Pytlak	107	336 (339)	36	91	23	1	2	39	28 (30)	.271 (.268)	.329 (.330)	.363 (.360)	
1B	Jimmie Foxx	135	487	87	146	27	8	19	105 (104)	93	.300	.412	.505	
2B	Bobby Doerr	132	500	74	141	28	4	16	93 (91)	43	.282	.339	.450	
SS	Joe Cronin	143	518	98	161	38	8	16	95 (96)	82	.311	.406	.508	
3B	Jim Tabor	126	498	65	139	29	3	16	101 (103)	36	.279	.328	.446	
OF	Ted Williams	143	456	135	185	33	3	37	120 (119)	145 (147)	.406	.551 (.553)	.735	
OF	Lou Finney	127	497	83	143	24	10	4	53 (54)	38	.288	.340	.400	
OF	Dom DiMaggio	144	584	117	165	37	6	8	58	90	.283	.385	.408	

==== Other batters ====
Abbreviations: GP=Games played; AB=At bats; R=Runs; H=Hits; 2B=Doubles; 3B=Triples; HR=Home runs; RBI=Runs batted in; BB=Walks; AVG=Batting average; OBP=On base percentage; SLG=Slugging percentage

Player	GP	AB	R	H	2B	3B	HR	RBI	BB	AVG	OBP	SLG	References
Pete Fox	73	268	38	81	12	7	0	31	21	.302	.357	.399	
Johnny Peacock	78	261 (258)	28	74	20	1	0	27 (26)	21 (19)	.284 (.287)	.339 (.338)	.368 (.372)	
Skeeter Newsome	93	227	28	51	6	0	2	17	22 (20)	.225	.296 (.290)	.278	
Stan Spence	86	203	22	47	10	3	2	28	18	.232	.304	.340	
Al Flair	10	30	3	6	2	1	0	2	1	.200	.226	.333	
Odell Hale	12	24	5	5	2	0	1	1	3	.208	.296	.417	
Tom Carey	25	21	7	4	0	0	0	2	0	.190	.190	.190	
Paul Campbell	1	0	0	0	0	0	0	0	0	.000 (─)	.000 (─)	.000 (─)	

==== Pitchers ====
Abbreviations: GP=Games played; AB=At bats; R=Runs; H=Hits; 2B=Doubles; 3B=Triples; HR=Home runs; RBI=Runs batted in; BB=Walks; AVG=Batting average; OBP=On base percentage; SLG=Slugging percentage

Player	GP	AB	R	H	2B	3B	HR	RBI	BB	AVG	OBP	SLG	References
Dick Newsome	36	78	3	19	3	0	0	8	2	.244	.263	.282	
Charlie Wagner	29	63	5	10	1	0	0	3	3	.159	.197	.175	
Mickey Harris	35	55	9	6	1	0	0	0	17	.109	.319	.127	
Joe Dobson	27	47	3	7	0	0	1	6	4	.149	.216	.213	
Lefty Grove	21	45	6	5	2	0	0	0	4	.111	.184	.156	
Jack Wilson	27	44	2	7	1	0	0	6	1	.159	.178	.182	
Mike Ryba	40	37	2	8	2	0	0	4	2	.216	.256	.270	
Earl Johnson	17	34	4	10	0	0	0	2	2	.294	.333	.294	

=== Pitching ===
Note: GP=Games Played; GS=Games Started; IP=Innings Pitched; H=Hits; BB=Walks; R=Runs; ER=Earned Runs; SO=Strikeouts; W=Wins; L=Losses; SV=Saves; ERA=Earned Run Average

==== Starting pitchers ====
Player	GP	GS	IP	H	BB	R	ER	SO	W	L	SV	ERA	References
Dick Newsome	36	29	213 2/3	235	79	115	98 (97)	58	19	10	0	4.13 (4.09)	
Mickey Harris	35	22	194 (194 1/3)	189	86 (87)	86	70	111 (110)	8	14	1	3.25 (3.24)	
Charlie Wagner	29	25	187 1/3	175	85	76	64 (62)	51	12	8	0	3.07 (2.98)	
Joe Dobson	27	18	134 1/3	136	67	70	67	69	12	5	0	4.49	
Lefty Grove	21	21	134 (134 1/3)	155	42	84	65 (64)	54	7	7	0	4.37 (4.29)	
Jack Wilson	27	12	116 1/3	140	70	82	65 (64)	55 (54)	4	13	1	5.03 (4.95)	
Mike Ryba	40	3	121 (120 2/3)	143	42	72 (73)	60 (61)	54	7	3	6	4.46 (4.55)	
Earl Johnson	17	12	93 2/3	90	51	57 (56)	47 (46)	46	4	5	0	4.52 (4.42)	
Tex Hughson	12	8	61	70	13	30	28	22 (24)	5	3	0	4.13	
Bill Fleming	16	1	41 1/3	32	24	21	18 (17)	20	1	1	1	3.92 (3.70)	
Emerson Dickman	9	3	31	37	17 (16)	23	22	16	1	1	0	6.39	
Woody Rich	2	1	3 2/3	8	2	7	7	4	0	0	0	17.18	

==== Relief pitchers ====
Note: GP=Games Played; GS=Games Started; IP=Innings Pitched; H=Hits; BB=Walks; R=Runs; ER=Earned Runs; SO=Strikeouts; W=Wins; L=Losses; SV=Saves; ERA=Earned Run Average

Player	GP	GS	IP	H	BB	R	ER	SO	W	L	SV	ERA	References
Nels Potter	10	0	20 (19 2/3)	21	16	10	10	6 (5)	2	0	0	4.50 (4.58)	
Oscar Judd	7	0	12 1/3	15	10	12	12	5	0	0	1	8.76	
Herb Hash	4	0	8 1/3	7	7	5	5	3	1	0	1	5.40	

== Awards and honors ==
- Ted Williams, 20th-century record, Highest on-base percentage in one season (.553)

=== All-Stars ===
- Joe Cronin starting SS
- Dom DiMaggio reserve
- Bobby Doerr starting 2B
- Jimmie Foxx reserve
- Ted Williams starting LF

=== League top five finishers ===
Dom DiMaggio

- Third in MLB in Runs Scored (117).

Dick Newsome

Fifth in MLB in Wins (19).

- Third in AL in Wins.

Charlie Wagner

  1. 3 in AL in ERA (3.07)

Ted Williams

- AL leader, reached base safely in 69 consecutive games.
- MLB leader in batting average (.406).
- MLB leader in home runs (37).
- MLB leader in runs scored (135).
- MLB leader in on-base percentage (.553).
- MLB leader in slugging percentage (.735).
- MLB leader in walks drawn (145).
  1. 4 in AL in RBI (120)

== Farm system ==
Level	Team	League	Manager
AA	Louisville Colonels	American Association	Bill Burwell
A	Scranton Red Sox	Eastern League	Nemo Leibold
B	Greensboro Red Sox	Piedmont League	Heinie Manush
C	Canton Terriers	Middle Atlantic League	Floyd "Pat" Patterson
D	Danville-Schoolfield Leafs	Bi-State League	Elmer Yoter
D	Centreville Red Sox	Eastern Shore League	Ed Walls and Eddie Popowski
D	Owensboro Oilers	KITTY League	Hughie Wise
