= List of Boston Red Sox Opening Day starting pitchers =

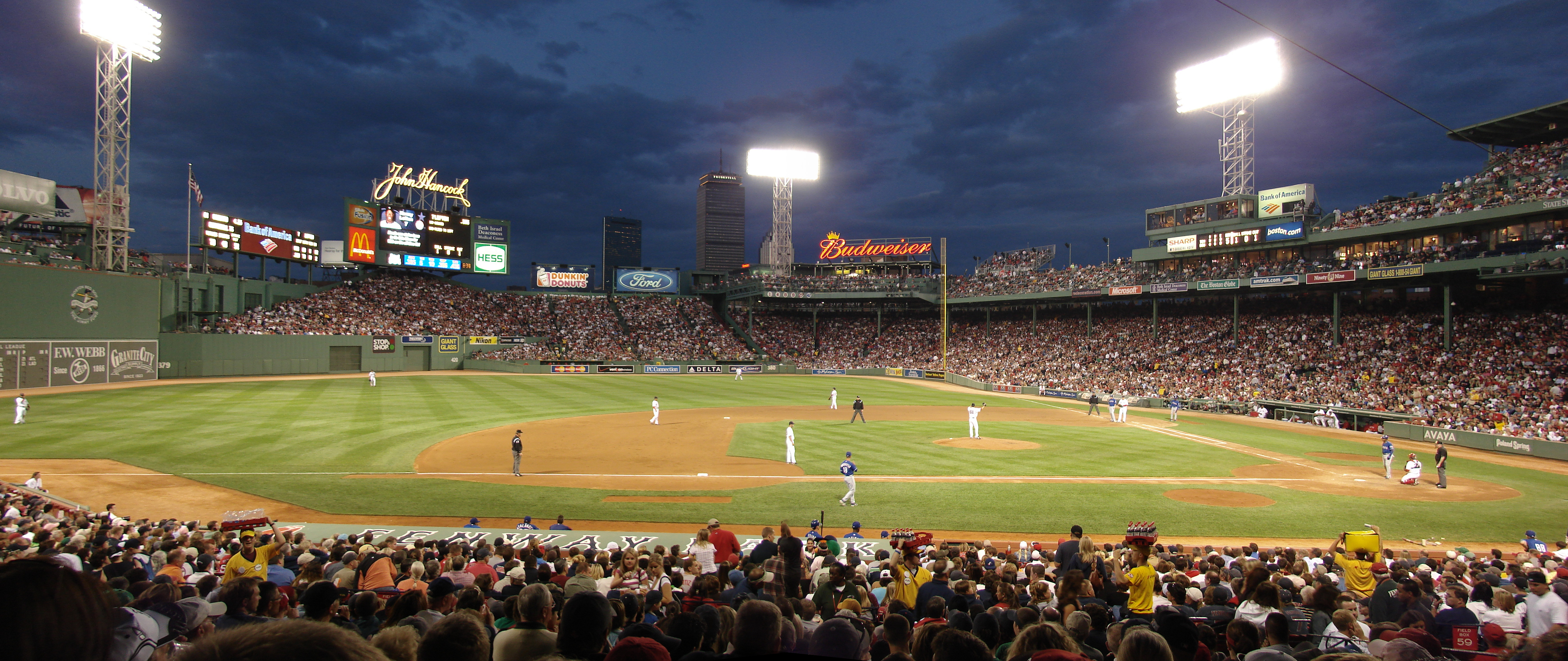
Fenway Park, Boston's home ballpark since 1912

The Boston Red Sox are a Major League Baseball (MLB) franchise based in Boston, Massachusetts. They have played in the American League since it was founded in 1901, and the American League East since divisions were introduced in 1969. The first game of each baseball season for a team is known as Opening Day, for which being named the starting pitcher is an honor. That honor is often given to the player who is expected to lead the pitching staff that season, although there are various strategic reasons why a team's best pitcher might not start on Opening Day.

== Records ==
Including the team's first 2026 game, the team has had 126 Opening Days. In those Opening Day games:

- The team has used 67 different starting pitchers.
  - Roger Clemens holds the team record for most starts with eight. Other pitchers with four or more starts are Pedro Martínez (7), Cy Young (6), Dennis Eckersley (5), Jon Lester (4), Bill Monbouquette (4), and Mel Parnell (4).
- The team has a win–loss record of 62–63–1, which is a winning percentage of .496.
  - The one tie occurred in 1910; playing against the New York Highlanders at Hilltop Park in New York City, the game was declared a tie after 14 innings on account of darkness. The first MLB night game did not occur until 1935.
- Starting pitchers have compiled a win–loss record of 50–45, with 31 no decisions.
  - The most wins is three, by Roger Clemens, Wes Ferrell, Pedro Martínez, Babe Ruth, and Cy Young. The most losses is three, by Howard Ehmke and Cy Young. The most no decisions is three, by Clemens and Martínez.

=== Results by decade ===
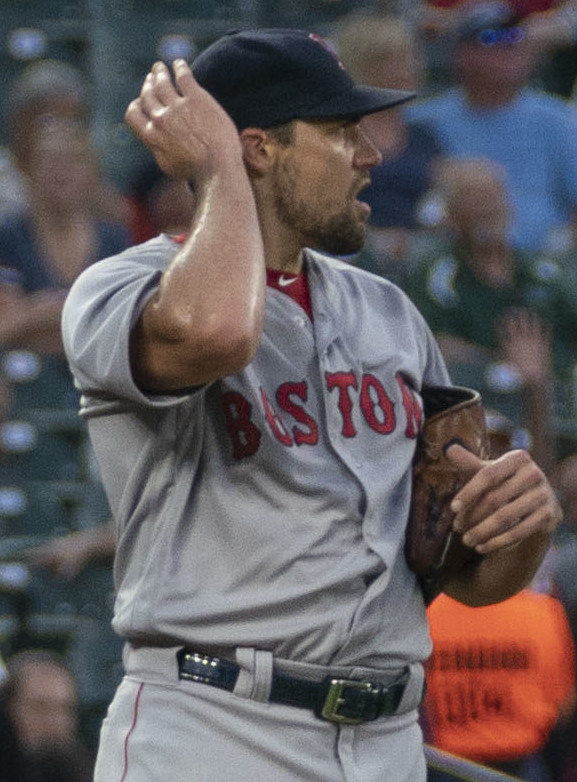
Nathan Eovaldi was the Red Sox' starting pitcher for Opening Day in 2020, 2021, and 2022.

Decade	Team W–L–T	Pitchers' W–L (ND)	New starters†
1900s‡	4–5	4–5	4 (Kellum, Young, Winter, Arellanes)
1910s	5–4–1	5–4 (1)	6 (Cicotte, Wood, Collins, Shore, Ruth, Mays)
1920s	3–7	3–6 (1)	8 (Russell, Jones, Quinn, Ehmke, Ferguson, Harriss, Harriss, Ruffing)
1930s	5–5	4–4 (2)	6 (Moore, Andrews, Rhodes, Ferrell, Bagby, Grove)
1940s	6–4	4–4 (2)	6 (Wilson, Newsome, Hughson, Terry, Cecil, Dobson)
1950s	5–5	4–4 (2)	4 (Parnell, Wight, Sullivan, Brewer)
1960s	5–5	3–4 (3)	6 (Sturdivant, Monbouquette, Schwall, Wilson, Lonborg, Ellsworth)
1970s	6–4	5–2 (3)	7 (Peters, Culp, Pattin, Tiant, Jenkins, Torrez, Eckersley)
1980s	2–8	2–3 (5)	4 (Hurst, Boyd, Stanley, Clemens)
1990s	8–2	6–2 (2)	3 (Sele, Gordon, Martinez)
2000s	4–6	3–3 (4)	4 (Wells, Schilling, Matsuzaka, Beckett)
2010s	5–5	4–2 (4)	5 (Lester, Buchholz, Price, Porcello, Sale)
2020s	5–3	3–2 (3)	4 (Eovaldi, Kluber, Bello, Crochet)
TOTALS	62–63–1	50–45 (31)	67

‡ 1900s spans nine seasons, as 1901 was the team's first season.
† Number of pitchers making their first Opening Day start for the Red Sox franchise, along with their surnames. Pitchers' full names appear in the below List.

== Pitchers ==
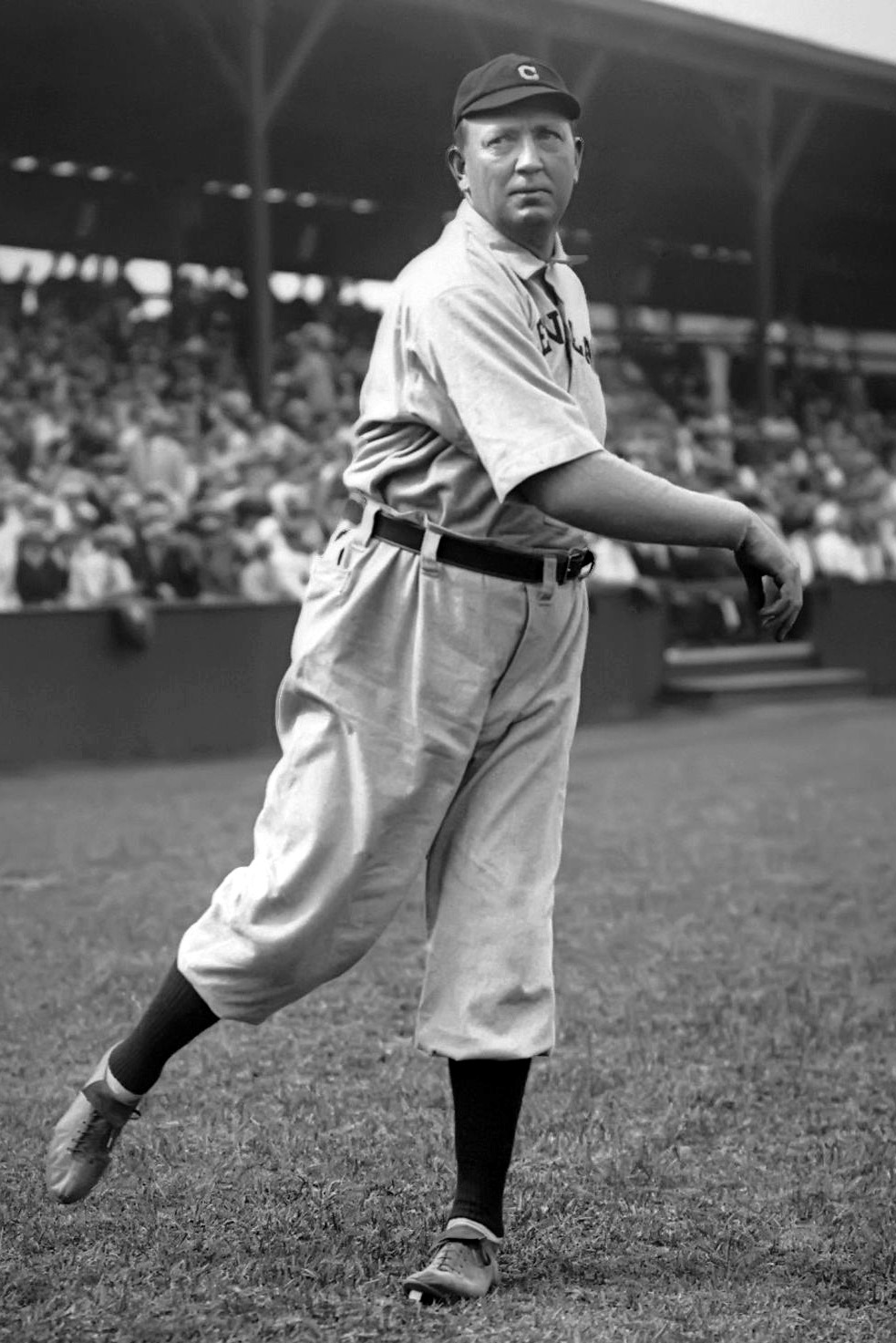
Cy Young was Boston's Opening Day starting pitcher six times between 1902 and 1908.

=== Key ===
Season	Each year is linked to an article about that particular Red Sox season.
W	Win
L	Loss
T	Tie
ND (X)	No decision by starting pitcher; (X) indicates game outcome for Red Sox
Pitcher (#)	Number of Opening Day starts for the Red Sox, if more than one
*	Team advanced to the post-season
**	American League (AL) Champions
***	World Series Champions

=== List ===
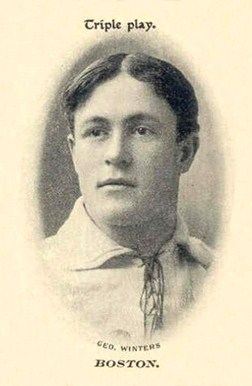
George Winter pitched on Opening Day for the Boston Americans in 1903.

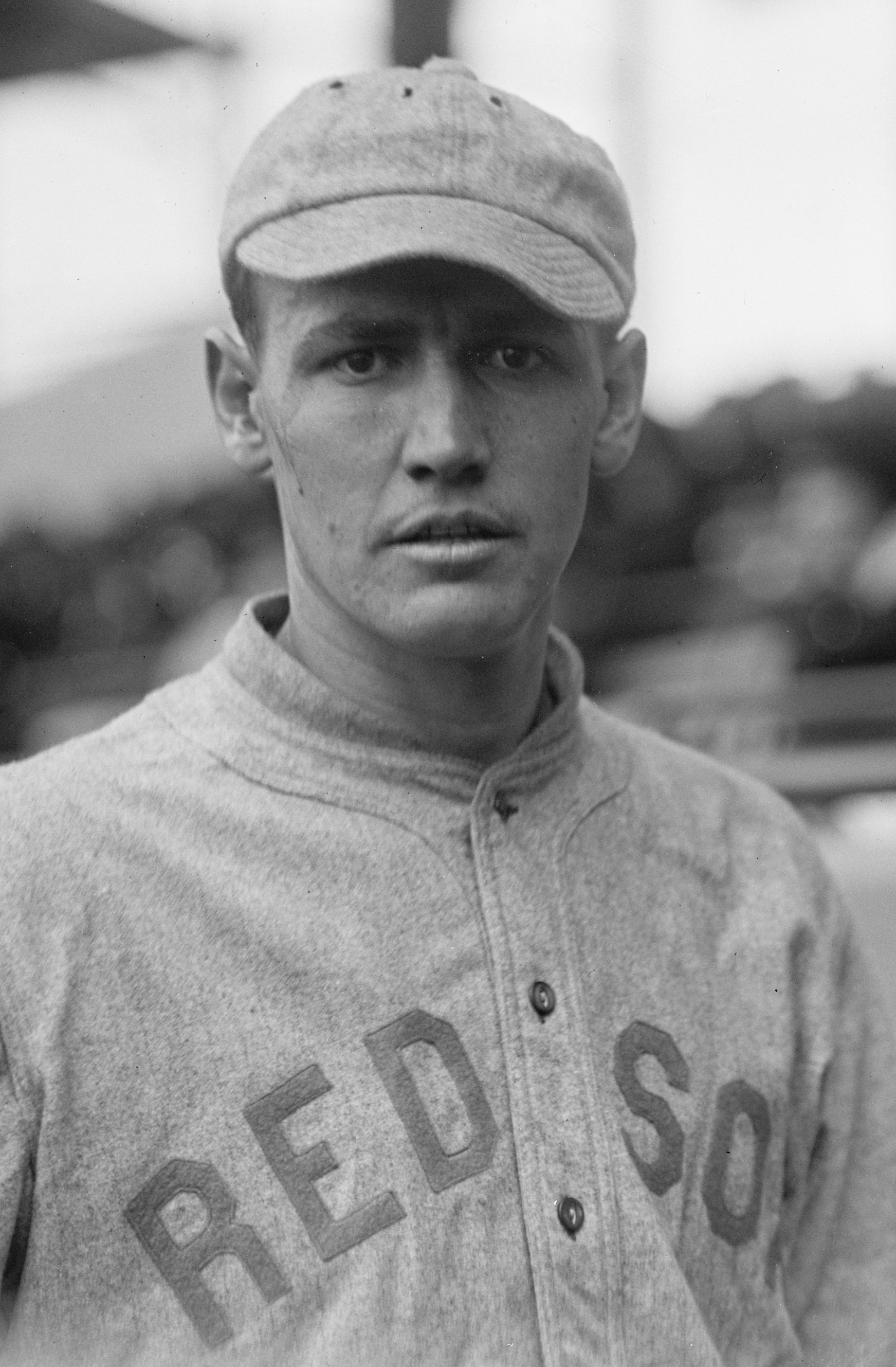
Smoky Joe Wood was the Opening Day starter three times, 1911–1913.

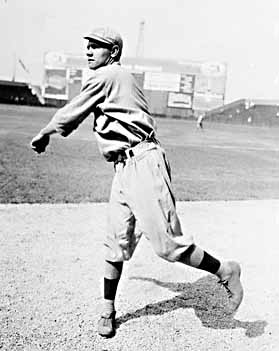
Babe Ruth started on Opening Day in 1916, 1917, and 1918.

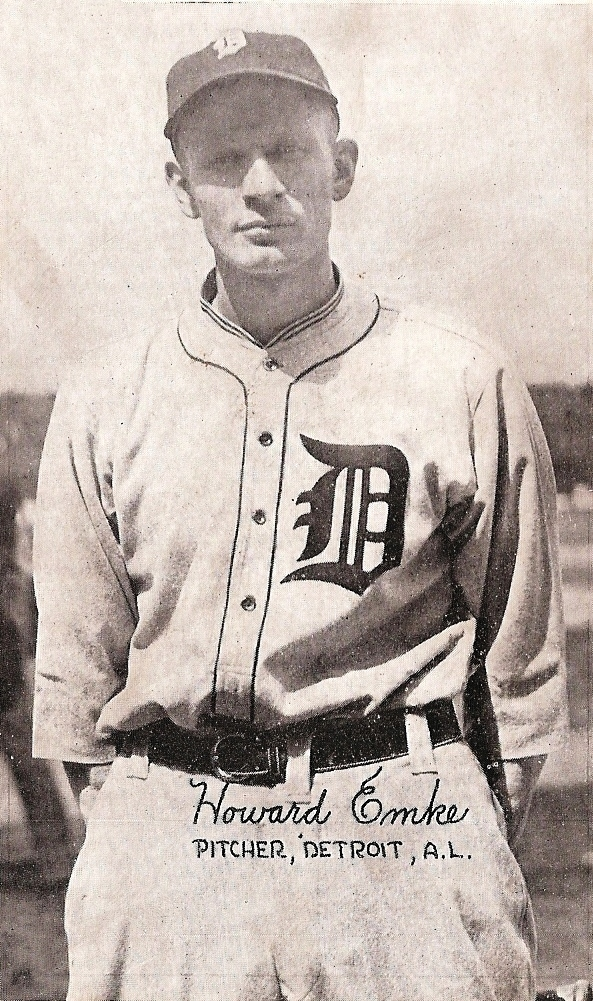
In 1923, 1924, and 1926, Howard Ehmke started on Opening Day for the Red Sox.

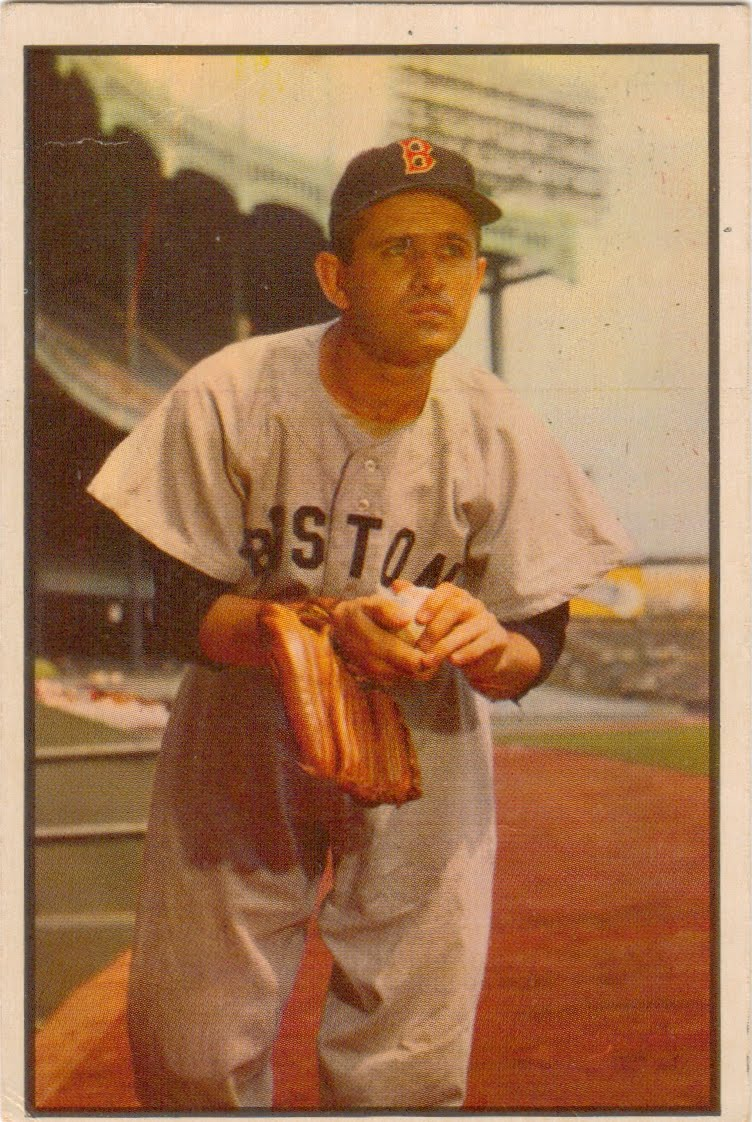
Mel Parnell started four Opening Day games for the Red Sox, all in the 1950s.

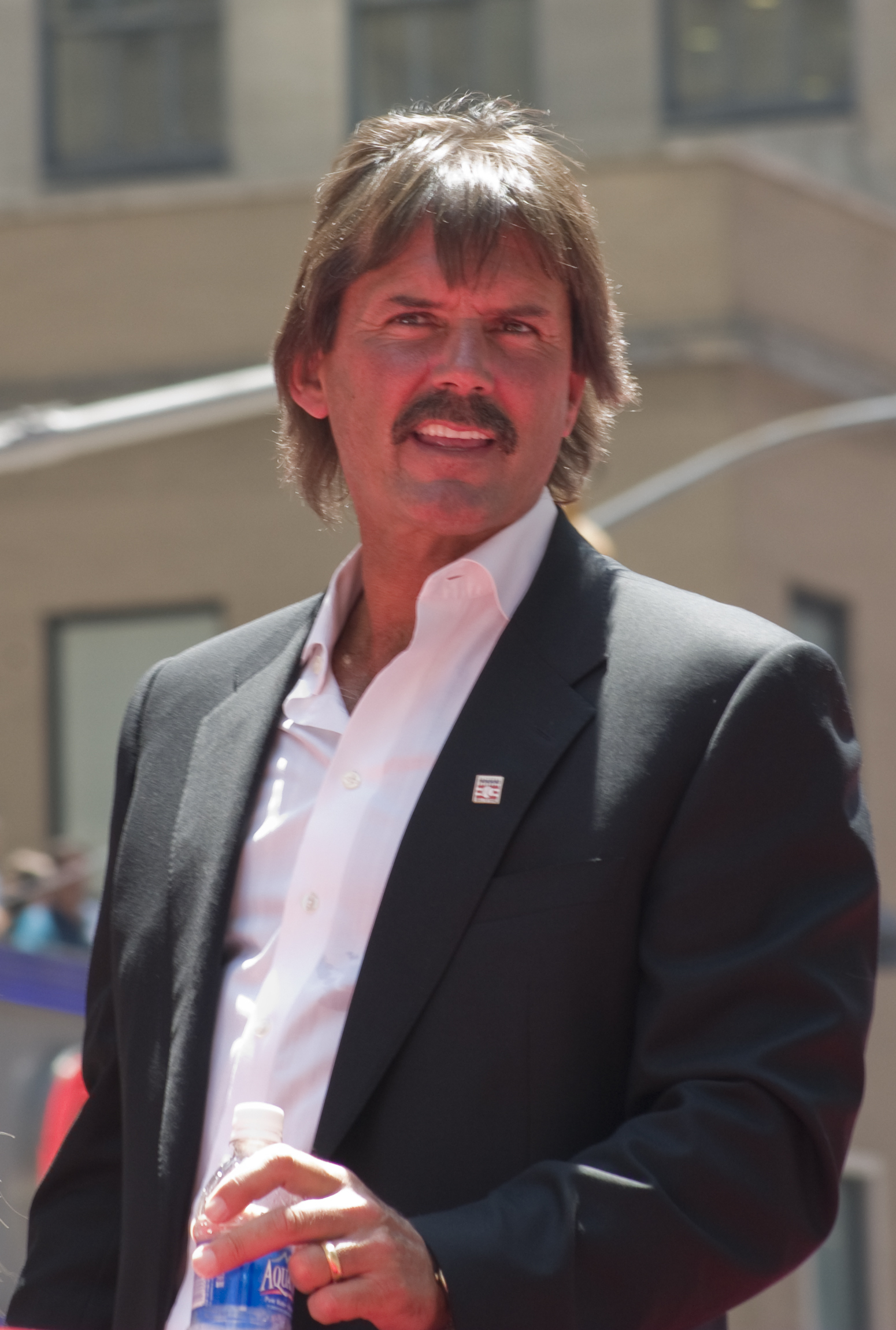
Dennis Eckersley made five consecutive Opening Day starts for Boston, 1979–1983.

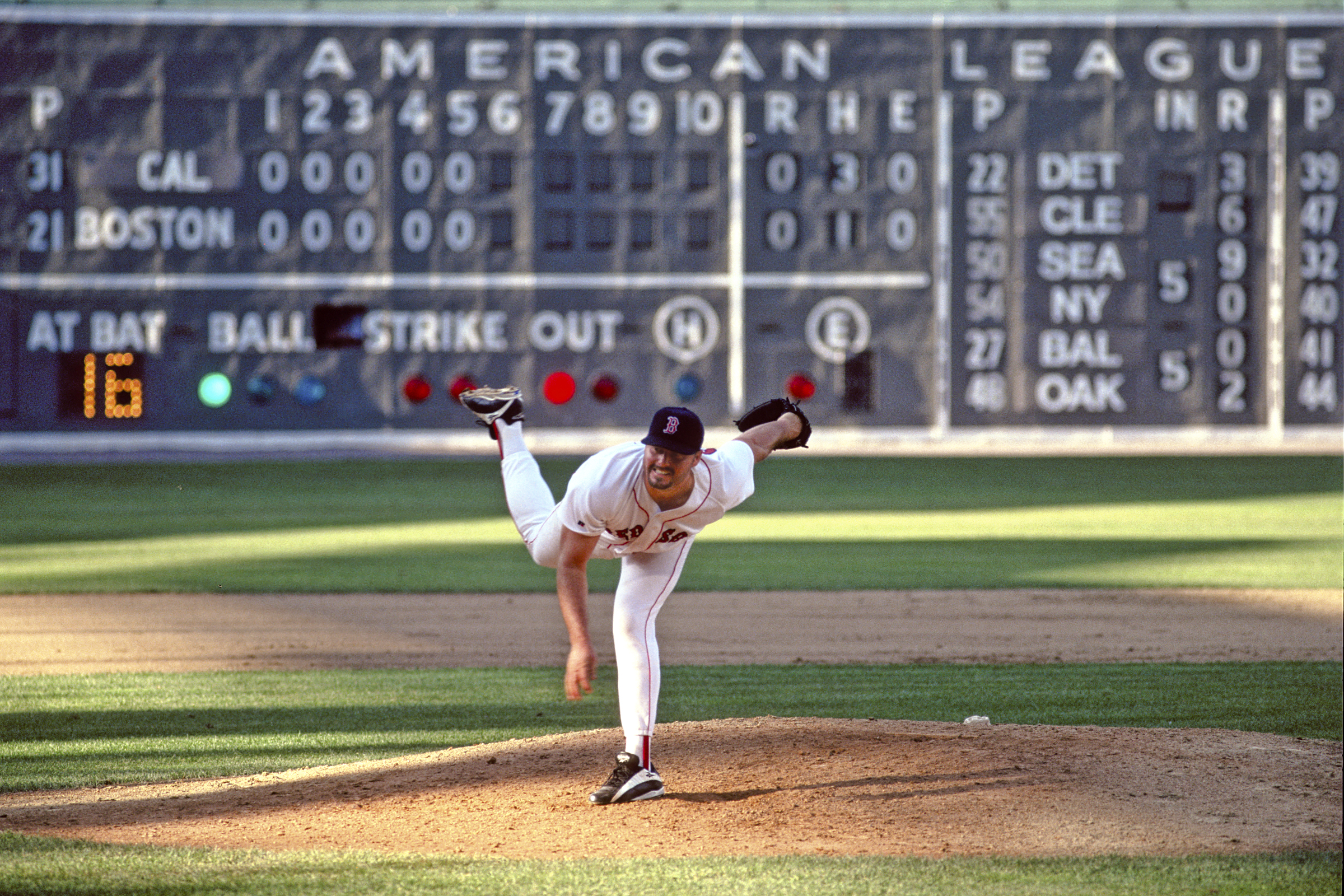
Roger Clemens was Boston's Opening Day starting pitcher eight times between 1988 and 1996.

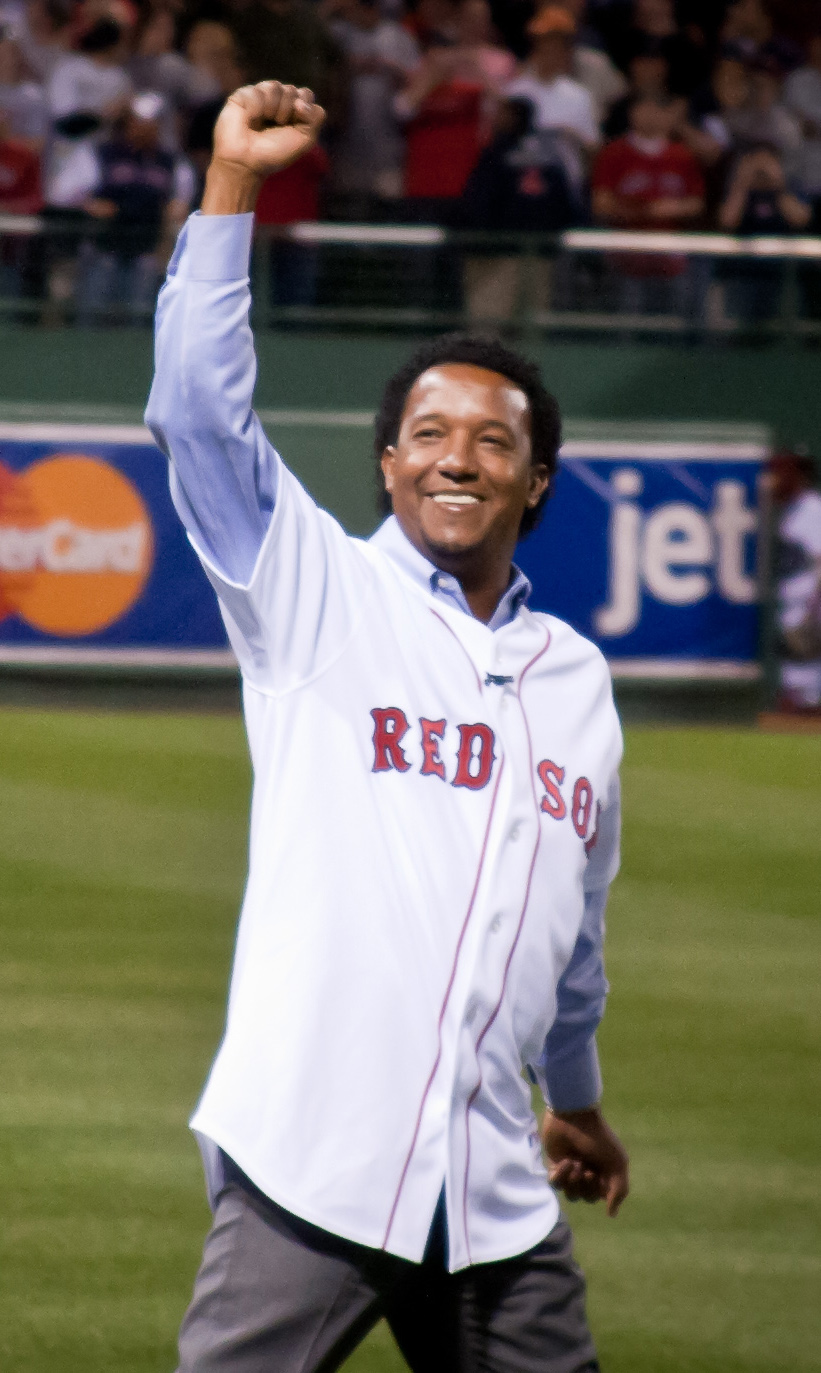
From 1998 through 2004, Pedro Martínez was Boston's Opening Day starting pitcher.

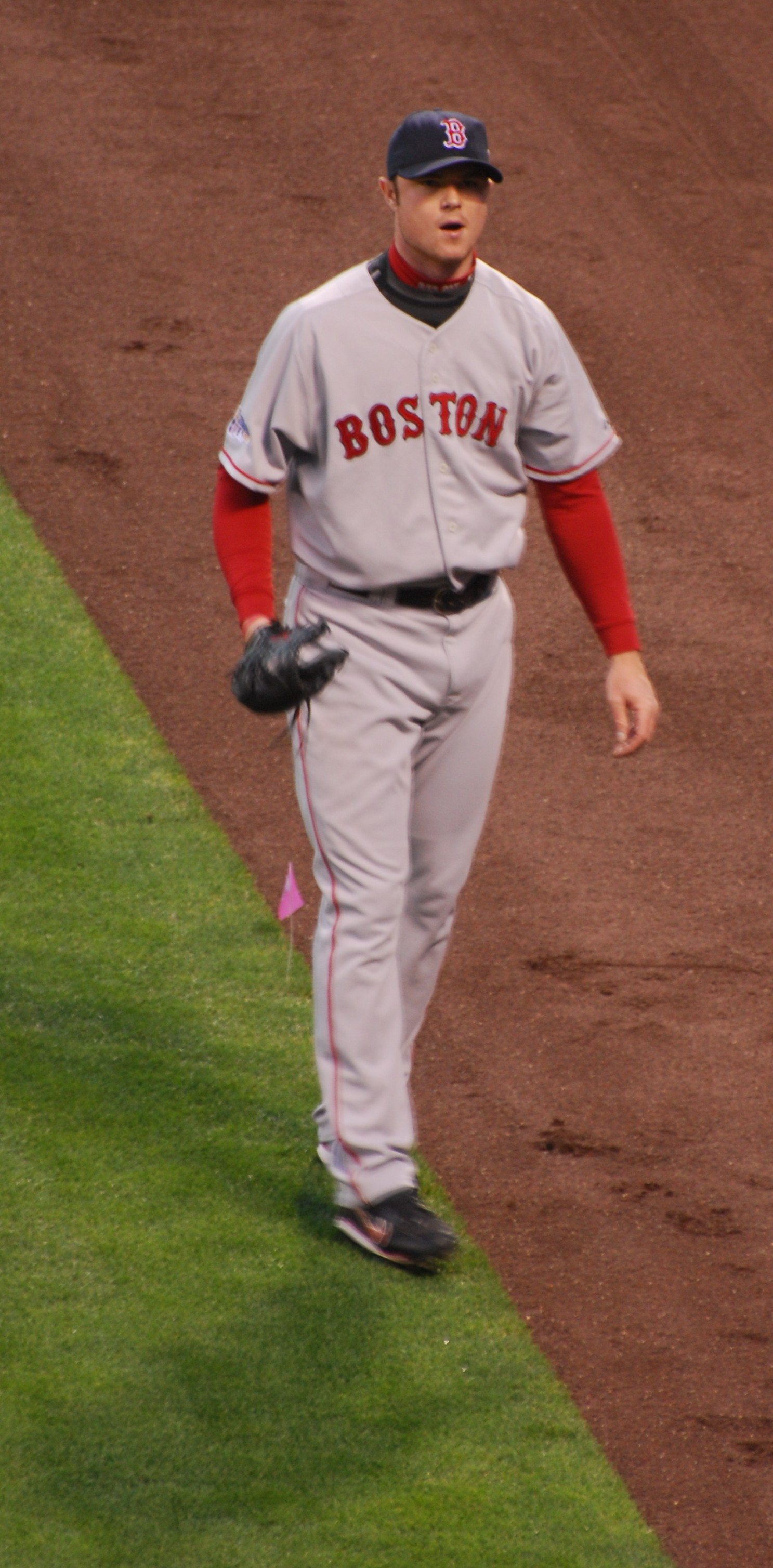
Jon Lester was Opening Day starting pitcher for Boston from 2011 through 2014.

Season	Pitcher	W/L	Opponent	Location	Ref(s)
1901	Win Kellum	L	Baltimore Orioles	Oriole Park	
1902	Cy Young	W	Baltimore Orioles	Huntington Avenue Grounds	
1903***	George Winter	W	Philadelphia Athletics	Huntington Avenue Grounds	
1904**	Cy Young (2)	L	New York Highlanders	Hilltop Park	
1905	Cy Young (3)	L	Philadelphia Athletics	Columbia Park	
1906	Cy Young (4)	L	New York Highlanders	Hilltop Park	
1907	Cy Young (5)	W	Philadelphia Athletics	Columbia Park	
1908	Cy Young (6)	W	Washington Senators	Huntington Avenue Grounds	
1909	Frank Arellanes	L	Philadelphia Athletics	Shibe Park	
1910	Eddie Cicotte	ND (T)	New York Highlanders	Hilltop Park	
1911	Joe Wood	L	Washington Senators	Griffith Stadium	
1912***	Joe Wood (2)	W	New York Highlanders	Hilltop Park	
1913	Joe Wood (3)	L	Philadelphia Athletics	Fenway Park	
1914	Ray Collins	L	Washington Senators	Fenway Park	
1915***	Ernie Shore	L	Philadelphia Athletics	Shibe Park	
1916***	Babe Ruth	W	Philadelphia Athletics	Fenway Park	
1917	Babe Ruth (2)	W	New York Yankees	Polo Grounds	
1918***	Babe Ruth (3)	W	Philadelphia Athletics	Fenway Park	
1919	Carl Mays	W	New York Yankees	Polo Grounds	
1920	Allen Russell	W	Washington Senators	Fenway Park	
1921	Sam Jones	W	Washington Senators	Griffith Stadium	
1922	Jack Quinn	L	Philadelphia Athletics	Fenway Park	
1923	Howard Ehmke	L	New York Yankees	Yankee Stadium	
1924	Howard Ehmke (2)	L	New York Yankees	Fenway Park	
1925	Alex Ferguson	ND (L)	Philadelphia Athletics	Fenway Park	
1926	Howard Ehmke (3)	L	New York Yankees	Fenway Park	
1927	Slim Harriss	L	Washington Senators	Griffith Stadium	
1928	Danny MacFayden	W	Washington Senators	Griffith Stadium	
1929	Red Ruffing	L	New York Yankees	Yankee Stadium	
1930	Danny MacFayden (2)	ND (W)	Washington Senators	Griffith Stadium	
1931	Wilcy Moore	L	New York Yankees	Yankee Stadium	
1932	Danny MacFayden (3)	L	Washington Senators	Griffith Stadium	
1933	Ivy Andrews	L	New York Yankees	Yankee Stadium	
1934	Gordon Rhodes	ND (L)	Washington Senators	Fenway Park	
1935	Wes Ferrell	W	New York Yankees	Yankee Stadium	
1936	Wes Ferrell (2)	W	Philadelphia Athletics	Fenway Park	
1937	Wes Ferrell (3)	W	Philadelphia Athletics	Shibe Park	
1938	Jim Bagby	W	New York Yankees	Fenway Park	
1939	Lefty Grove	L	New York Yankees	Yankee Stadium	
1940	Lefty Grove (2)	W	Washington Senators	Griffith Stadium	
1941	Jack Wilson	ND (W)	Washington Senators	Fenway Park	
1942	Dick Newsome	W	Philadelphia Athletics	Fenway Park	
1943	Tex Hughson	W	Philadelphia Athletics	Shibe Park	
1944	Yank Terry	L	New York Yankees	Fenway Park	
1945	Rex Cecil	L	New York Yankees	Yankee Stadium	
1946**	Tex Hughson (2)	W	Washington Senators	Griffith Park	
1947	Tex Hughson (3)	ND (W)	Washington Senators	Fenway Park	
1948	Joe Dobson	L	Philadelphia Athletics	Fenway Park	
1949	Joe Dobson (2)	L	Philadelphia Athletics	Shibe Park	
1950	Mel Parnell	ND (L)	New York Yankees	Fenway Park	
1951	Bill Wight	L	New York Yankees	Yankee Stadium	
1952	Mel Parnell (2)	W	Washington Senators	Griffith Stadium	
1953	Mel Parnell (3)	ND (W)	Philadelphia Athletics	Shibe Park	
1954	Mel Parnell (4)	L	Philadelphia Athletics	Shibe Park	
1955	Frank Sullivan	W	Philadelphia Athletics	Shibe Park	
1956	Frank Sullivan (2)	W	Baltimore Orioles	Fenway Park	
1957	Tom Brewer	W	Baltimore Orioles	Memorial Stadium	
1958	Frank Sullivan (3)	L	Washington Senators	Griffith Stadium	
1959	Tom Brewer (2)	L	New York Yankees	Yankee Stadium	
1960	Tom Sturdivant	L	Washington Senators	Griffith Stadium	
1961	Bill Monbouquette	L	Kansas City Athletics	Fenway Park	
1962	Don Schwall	L	Cleveland Indians	Fenway Park	
1963	Bill Monbouquette (2)	L	Los Angeles Angels	Chavez Ravine	
1964	Bill Monbouquette (3)	ND (W)	New York Yankees	Yankee Stadium	
1965	Bill Monbouquette (4)	W	Washington Senators	Robert F. Kennedy Memorial Stadium	
1966	Earl Wilson	ND (L)	Baltimore Orioles	Fenway Park	
1967**	Jim Lonborg	W	Chicago White Sox	Fenway Park	
1968	Dick Ellsworth	W	Detroit Tigers	Tiger Stadium	
1969	Jim Lonborg (2)	ND (W)	Baltimore Orioles	Memorial Stadium	
1970	Gary Peters	W	New York Yankees	Yankee Stadium	
1971	Ray Culp	W	New York Yankees	Fenway Park	
1972	Marty Pattin	L	Detroit Tigers	Tiger Stadium	
1973	Luis Tiant	W	New York Yankees	Fenway Park	
1974	Luis Tiant (2)	ND (W)	Milwaukee Brewers	County Stadium	
1975**	Luis Tiant (3)	W	Milwaukee Brewers	Fenway Park	
1976	Ferguson Jenkins	L	Baltimore Orioles	Memorial Stadium	
1977	Ferguson Jenkins (2)	ND (L)	Cleveland Indians	Fenway Park	
1978	Mike Torrez	ND (L)	Chicago White Sox	Comiskey Park	
1979	Dennis Eckersley	W	Cleveland Indians	Fenway Park	
1980	Dennis Eckersley (2)	ND (L)	Milwaukee Brewers	County Stadium	
1981	Dennis Eckersley (3)	ND (L)	Chicago White Sox	Fenway Park	
1982	Dennis Eckersley (4)	W	Baltimore Orioles	Memorial Stadium	
1983	Dennis Eckersley (5)	L	Toronto Blue Jays	Fenway Park	
1984	Bruce Hurst	L	California Angels	Angel Stadium of Anaheim	
1985	Oil Can Boyd	W	New York Yankees	Fenway Park	
1986**	Bruce Hurst (2)	ND (L)	Detroit Tigers	Tiger Stadium	
1987	Bob Stanley	L	Milwaukee Brewers	County Stadium	
1988*	Roger Clemens	ND (L)	Detroit Tigers	Fenway Park	
1989	Roger Clemens (2)	ND (L)	Baltimore Orioles	Memorial Stadium	
1990*	Roger Clemens (3)	W	Detroit Tigers	Fenway Park	
1991	Roger Clemens (4)	W	Toronto Blue Jays	SkyDome	
1992	Roger Clemens (5)	L	New York Yankees	Yankee Stadium	
1993	Roger Clemens (6)	W	Kansas City Royals	Kauffman Stadium	
1994	Roger Clemens (7)	ND (W)	Detroit Tigers	Fenway Park	
1995*	Aaron Sele	W	Minnesota Twins	Fenway Park	
1996	Roger Clemens (8)	L	Texas Rangers	Rangers Ballpark in Arlington	
1997	Tom Gordon	ND (W)	Anaheim Angels	Angel Stadium of Anaheim	
1998*	Pedro Martinez	W	Oakland Athletics	Network Associates Coliseum	
1999*	Pedro Martinez (2)	W	Kansas City Royals	Kauffman Stadium	
2000	Pedro Martinez (3)	W	Seattle Mariners	Safeco Field	
2001	Pedro Martinez (4)	ND (L)	Baltimore Orioles	Oriole Park at Camden Yards	
2002	Pedro Martinez (5)	ND (L)	Toronto Blue Jays	Fenway Park	
2003*	Pedro Martinez (6)	ND (L)	Tampa Bay Devil Rays	Tropicana Field	
2004***	Pedro Martinez (7)	L	Baltimore Orioles	Oriole Park at Camden Yards	
2005*	David Wells	L	New York Yankees	Yankee Stadium	
2006	Curt Schilling	W	Texas Rangers	Rangers Ballpark in Arlington	
2007***	Curt Schilling (2)	L	Kansas City Royals	Kauffman Stadium	
2008*	Daisuke Matsuzaka	ND (W)	Oakland Athletics	Tokyo Dome	
2009*	Josh Beckett	W	Tampa Bay Rays	Fenway Park	
2010	Josh Beckett (2)	ND (W)	New York Yankees	Fenway Park	
2011	Jon Lester	ND (L)	Texas Rangers	Rangers Ballpark in Arlington	
2012	Jon Lester (2)	ND (L)	Detroit Tigers	Comerica Park	
2013***	Jon Lester (3)	W	New York Yankees	Yankee Stadium	
2014	Jon Lester (4)	L	Baltimore Orioles	Oriole Park at Camden Yards	
2015	Clay Buchholz	W	Philadelphia Phillies	Citizens Bank Park	
2016*	David Price	W	Cleveland Indians	Progressive Field	
2017*	Rick Porcello	W	Pittsburgh Pirates	Fenway Park	
2018***	Chris Sale	ND (L)	Tampa Bay Rays	Tropicana Field	
2019	Chris Sale (2)	L	Seattle Mariners	T-Mobile Park	
2020	Nathan Eovaldi	W	Baltimore Orioles	Fenway Park	
2021*	Nathan Eovaldi (2)	L	Baltimore Orioles	Fenway Park	
2022	Nathan Eovaldi (3)	ND (L)	New York Yankees	Yankee Stadium	
2023	Corey Kluber	L	Baltimore Orioles	Fenway Park	
2024	Brayan Bello	W	Seattle Mariners	T-Mobile Park	
2025*	Garrett Crochet	ND (W)	Texas Rangers	Globe Life Field	
2026*	Garrett Crochet (2)	W	Cincinnati Reds	Great American Ball Park	
