= 1944 Boston Red Sox season =

Major League Baseball season

1944 Boston Red Sox
- League: American League
- Ballpark: Fenway Park
- City: Boston, Massachusetts
- Record: 77–77 (.500)
- League place: 4th
- Owners: Tom Yawkey
- President: Tom Yawkey
- General managers: Eddie Collins
- Managers: Joe Cronin
- Radio: WAAB (Jim Britt); WNAC (Tom Hussey)
- Stats: ESPN.com; Baseball Reference

The 1944 Boston Red Sox season was the 44th season in the franchise's Major League Baseball history. The Red Sox finished fourth in the American League (AL) with a record of 77 wins and 77 losses, 12 games behind the St. Louis Browns.

== Offseason ==
- October 15, 1943: Al Simmons was released by the Red Sox.

== Regular season ==
=== Season standings ===
American League
Team	W	L	Pct.	GB	Home	Road
St. Louis Browns	89	65	.578	—	54‍–‍23	35‍–‍42
Detroit Tigers	88	66	.571	1	43‍–‍34	45‍–‍32
New York Yankees	83	71	.539	6	47‍–‍31	36‍–‍40
Boston Red Sox	77	77	.500	12	47‍–‍30	30‍–‍47
Cleveland Indians	72	82	.468	17	39‍–‍38	33‍–‍44
Philadelphia Athletics	72	82	.468	17	39‍–‍37	33‍–‍45
Chicago White Sox	71	83	.461	18	41‍–‍36	30‍–‍47
Washington Senators	64	90	.416	25	40‍–‍37	24‍–‍53

=== Record vs. opponents ===
1944 American League record Sources:
Team	BOS	CWS	CLE	DET	NYY	PHA	SLB	WSH
Boston	—	17–5	8–14	10–12–2	11–11	11–11	10–12	10–12
Chicago	5–17	—	14–8	9–13	10–12	9–13	8–14	16–6
Cleveland	14–8	8–14	—	10–12	8–14	12–10–1	10–12	10–12
Detroit	12–10–2	13–9	12–10	—	14–8	11–11	9–13	17–5
New York	11–11	12–10	14–8	8–14	—	13–9	10–12	15–7
Philadelphia	11–11	13–9	10–12–1	11–11	9–13	—	9–13	9–13
St. Louis	12–10	14–8	12–10	13–9	12–10	13–9	—	13–9
Washington	12–10	6–16	12–10	5–17	7–15	13–9	9–13	—

=== Opening Day lineup ===
26	Skeeter Newsome	SS
2	Catfish Metkovich	1B
19	Ford Garrison	RF
8	Bob Johnson	LF
1	Bobby Doerr	2B
5	Jim Tabor	3B
11	Leon Culberson	CF
6	Roy Partee	C
18	Yank Terry	P

=== Roster ===
1944 Boston Red Sox
Roster
Pitchers: 17 Frank Barrett; 28 Joe Bowman; 14 Rex Cecil; 29 Clem Dreisewerd; 21 Clem Hausmann; 27 Tex Hughson; 16 Vic Johnson; 29 Oscar Judd; 24 Lou Lucier; 15 Emmett O'Neill; 6 Stan Partenheimer; 20 Mike Ryba; 18 Yank Terry; 17 Joe Wood; 10 Pinky Woods	Catchers: 23 Bill Conroy; 6 Roy Partee; 23 Johnny Peacock; 19 Hal Wagner; Infielders: 24 Jim Bucher; 4 Joe Cronin; 1 Bobby Doerr; 8 Lou Finney; 7 Eddie Lake; 26 Skeeter Newsome; 5 Jim Tabor	Outfielders: 11 Leon Culberson; 12 Pete Fox; 19 Ford Garrison; 8 Bob Johnson; 14 Johnny Lazor; 25 Tom McBride; 2 Catfish Metkovich	Manager: 4 Joe Cronin; Coaches: 30 Bill Burwell (Third base); 32 Tom Daly; 31 Frank Shellenback (Pitching); 22 Larry Woodall (First base)

== Player stats ==
=== Batting ===
==== Starters by position ====
Note: Pos = Position; G = Games played; AB = At bats; H = Hits; Avg. = Batting average; HR = Home runs; RBI = Runs batted in

Pos	Player	G	AB	H	Avg.	HR	RBI
C	Roy Partee	89	280	68	.243	2	41
1B	Lou Finney	68	251	72	.287	0	32
2B	Bobby Doerr	125	468	152	.325	15	81
SS	Skeeter Newsome	136	472	114	.242	0	41
3B	Jim Tabor	116	438	125	.285	13	72
OF	George Metkovich	134	549	152	.277	9	59
OF	Bob Johnson	144	525	170	.324	17	106
OF	Pete Fox	121	496	156	.315	1	64

==== Other batters ====
Note: G = Games played; AB = At bats; H = Hits; Avg. = Batting average; HR = Home runs; RBI = Runs batted in

Player	G	AB	H	Avg.	HR	RBI
Leon Culberson	75	282	67	.238	2	21
Jim Bucher	80	277	76	.274	4	31
Hal Wagner	66	223	74	.332	1	38
Tom McBride	71	216	53	.245	0	24
Joe Cronin	76	191	46	.241	5	28
Eddie Lake	57	126	26	.206	0	8
Ford Garrison	13	49	12	.245	0	2
Bill Conroy	19	47	10	.213	0	4
Johnny Lazor	16	24	2	.083	0	0
Johnny Peacock	4	4	0	.000	0	0

=== Pitching ===
==== Starting pitchers ====
Note: G = Games pitched; IP = Innings pitched; W = Wins; L = Losses; ERA = Earned run average; SO = Strikeouts

Player	G	IP	W	L	ERA	SO
Tex Hughson	28	203.1	18	5	2.26	112
Joe Bowman	26	168.1	12	8	4.81	53
Emmett O'Neill	28	151.2	6	11	4.63	68
Rex Cecil	11	61.0	4	5	5.16	33
Clem Dreisewerd	7	48.2	2	4	4.07	9
Stan Partenheimer	1	1.0	0	0	18.00	0

==== Other pitchers ====
Note: G = Games pitched; IP = Innings pitched; W = Wins; L = Losses; ERA = Earned run average; SO = Strikeouts

Player	G	IP	W	L	ERA	SO
Pinky Woods	38	170.2	4	8	3.27	56
Mike Ryba	42	138.0	12	7	3.33	50
Clem Hausmann	32	137.0	4	7	3.42	43
Yank Terry	27	132.2	6	10	4.21	30
Oscar Judd	9	30.0	1	1	3.60	9
Vic Johnson	7	27.1	0	3	6.26	7
Joe Wood	3	9.2	0	1	6.52	5

==== Relief pitchers ====
Note: G = Games pitched; W = Wins; L = Losses; SV = Saves; ERA = Earned run average; SO = Strikeouts

Player	G	W	L	SV	ERA	SO
Frank Barrett	38	8	7	8	3.69	80
Eddie Lake	6	0	0	0	4.19	7
Lou Lucier	3	0	0	0	5.06	2

== Farm system ==
Level	Team	League	Manager
AA	Louisville Colonels	American Association	Nemo Leibold
A	Scranton Red Sox	Eastern League	Heinie Manush
B	Roanoke Red Sox	Piedmont League	Eddie Popowski
D	Middletown Red Sox	Ohio State League	Red Barnes

LEAGUE CHAMPIONS: Louisville
