= List of Boston Red Sox seasons =

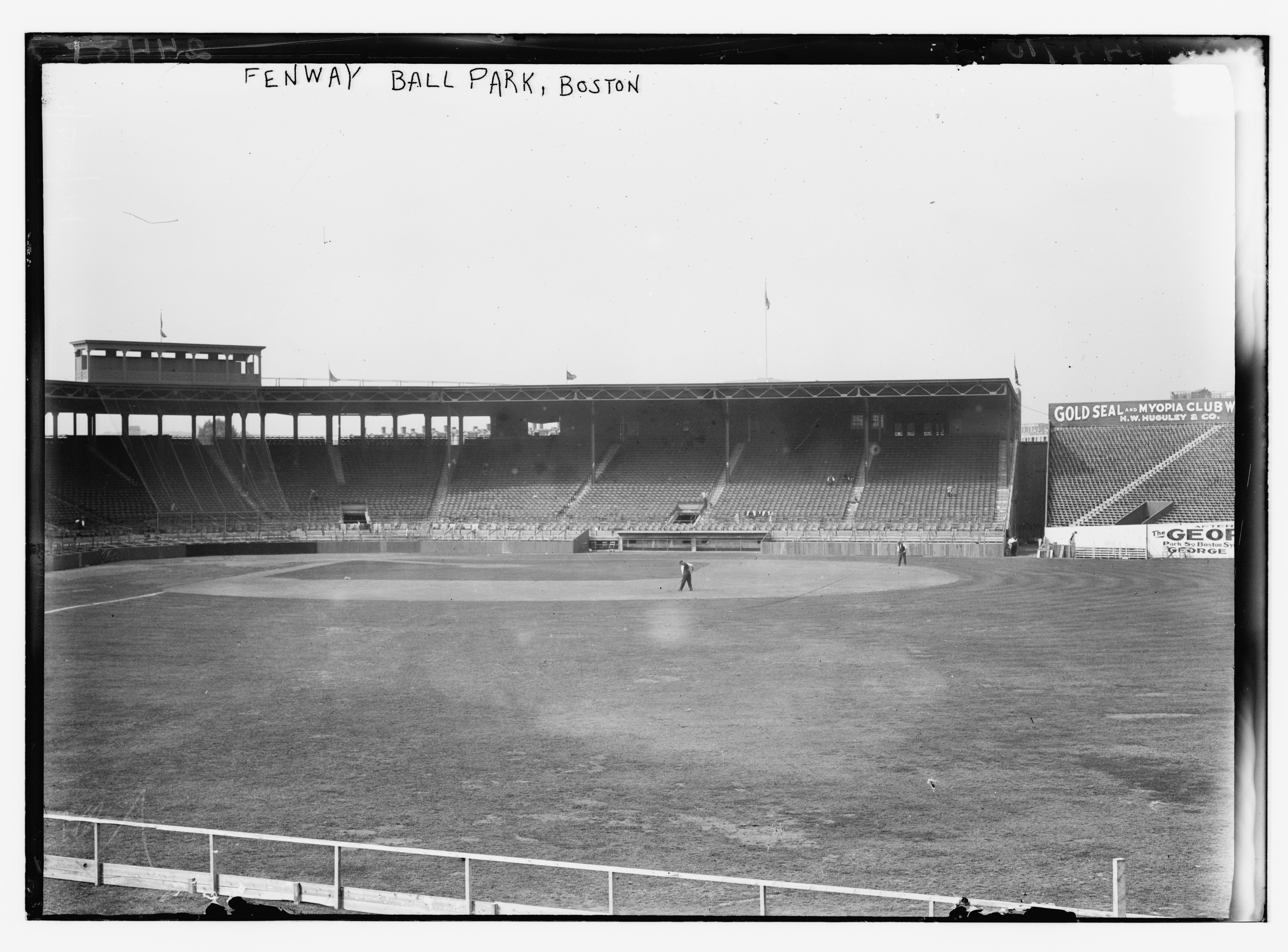
Fenway Park pictured c. 1914, two years after completion

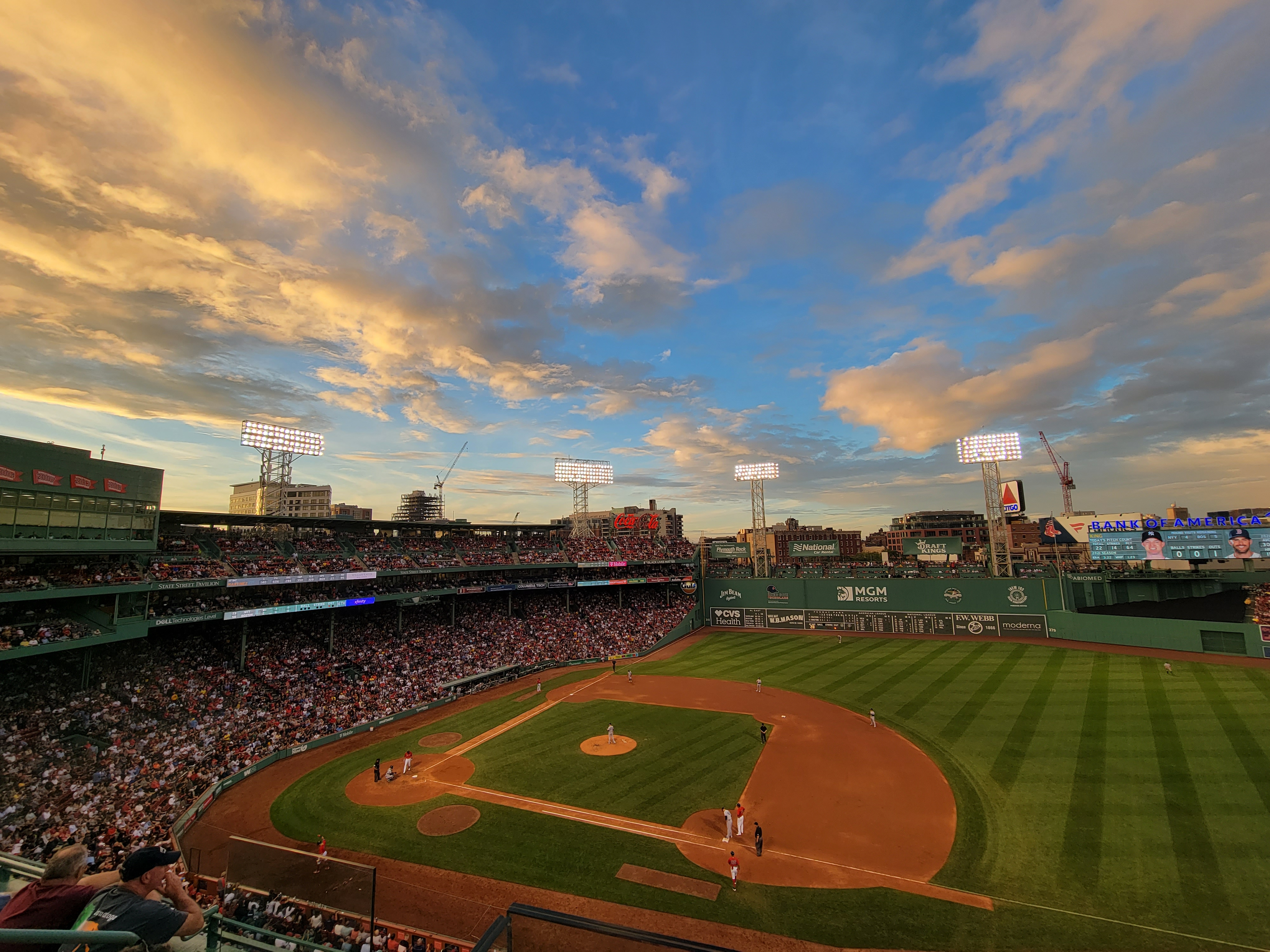
Fenway hosting long-time rivals the New York Yankees in 2021

The Boston Red Sox are a professional baseball team based in Boston, Massachusetts, founded in 1901 as one of Major League Baseball (MLB)'s American League (AL) eight charter franchises under the name the "Boston Americans". First playing home games at Huntington Avenue Grounds, the team became known as the "Red Sox" in 1908, before establishing Fenway Park—the oldest active ballpark in MLB—as their home ballpark upon its construction in 1912.

A dominant team in the early 20th century, the Red Sox (as the Boston Americans) won the first World Series in 1903 and had won a further four championships by 1918. Their following 86-year championship drought is one of the longest in baseball history, often attributed to the "Curse of the Bambino" said to have been initiated against the Red Sox upon the 1919 trade of star player Babe Ruth to the New York Yankees. The Red Sox' drought ended when the team won their sixth World Series championship in 2004, and they have since gone on to win another three World Series titles (in 2007, 2013, and 2018), to become the first and so far only team to win at least four World Series championships in the 21st century. The team's overall .518 regular season winning percentage is the 5th-highest in MLB.

Between May 15, 2003, and April 10, 2013, a span of 820 games over almost 10 years, every home game the Red Sox played at Fenway Park was sold out. The Red Sox have won nine World Series championships in franchise history, and most recently qualified for the postseason in 2026.

== Season record by year ==
†	World Series champions (1903–present)
*	American League champions (1901–present) (Note: For all American League pennant winners see List of American League pennant winners.)
^	Division champions (1969–present)
¤	Wild Card berth (1994–present)

Season record by year
Season	League	Division	Finish	Wins	Losses	Pct.	GB (Note: Games behind.)	Postseason	Awards	Ref.
Boston Americans
1901 (Note: Competed as the Boston Americans 1901–1907.)	AL		2nd	79	57	.581	4		Cy Young (TC)	
1902	AL		3rd	77	60	.562	6 1/2			
1903 †	AL *		1st	91	47	.659	+14.5 (Note: Games ahead.)	Won World Series (Pirates) 5–3 †		
1904	AL *		1st	95	59	.617	+1.5	World Series canceled (Note: The World Series was canceled after the New York Giants refused to play.) *		
1905	AL		4th	78	74	.513	16			
1906	AL		8th	49	105	.318	45 1/2			
1907	AL		7th	59	90	.396	32 1/2			
Boston Red Sox
1908	AL		5th	75	79	.487	15 1/2			
1909	AL		3rd	88	63	.583	9 1/2			
1910	AL		4th	81	72	.529	22 1/2			
1911	AL		4th	78	75	.510	24			
1912 †	AL *		1st	105	47	.691	+14	Won World Series (Giants) 4–3 †	Tris Speaker (MVP)	
1913	AL		4th	79	71	.527	15 1/2			
1914	AL		2nd	91	62	.595	8 1/2			
1915 †	AL *		1st	101	50	.669	+2.5	Won World Series (Phillies) 4–1 †		
1916 †	AL *		1st	91	63	.591	+2	Won World Series (Robins) 4–1 †		
1917	AL		2nd	90	62	.592	9			
1918 †	AL *		1st	75	51	.595	+2.5	Won World Series (Cubs) 4–2 †		
1919	AL		6th	66	71	.482	20 1/2			
1920	AL		5th	72	81	.471	25 1/2			
1921	AL		5th	75	79	.487	23 1/2			
1922	AL		8th	61	93	.396	33			
1923	AL		8th	61	91	.401	37			
1924	AL		7th	67	87	.435	25			
1925	AL		8th	47	105	.309	49 1/2			
1926	AL		8th	46	107	.301	44 1/2			
1927	AL		8th	51	103	.331	59			
1928	AL		8th	57	96	.373	43 1/2			
1929	AL		8th	58	96	.377	48			
1930	AL		8th	52	102	.338	50			
1931	AL		6th	62	90	.408	45			
1932	AL		8th	43	111	.279	64			
1933	AL		7th	63	86	.423	34 1/2			
1934	AL		4th	76	76	.500	24			
1935	AL		4th	78	75	.510	16			
1936	AL		6th	74	80	.481	28 1/2			
1937	AL		5th	80	72	.526	21			
1938	AL		2nd	88	61	.591	9 1/2		Jimmie Foxx (MVP)	
1939	AL		2nd	89	62	.589	17			
1940	AL		4th	82	72	.532	8			
1941	AL		2nd	84	70	.545	17			
1942	AL		2nd	93	59	.612	9		Ted Williams (TC)	
1943	AL		7th	68	84	.447	29			
1944	AL		4th	77	77	.500	12			
1945	AL		7th	71	83	.461	17 1/2			
1946	AL *		1st	104	50	.675	+12	Lost World Series (Cardinals) 4–3 *	Ted Williams (MVP)	
1947	AL		3rd	83	71	.539	14		Ted Williams (TC)	
1948	AL		2nd	96	59	.619	1			
1949	AL		2nd	96	58	.623	1		Ted Williams (MVP)	
1950	AL		3rd	94	60	.610	4		Walt Dropo (ROY)	
1951	AL		3rd	87	67	.565	11			
1952	AL		6th	76	78	.494	19			
1953	AL		4th	84	69	.549	16			
1954	AL		4th	69	85	.448	42			
1955	AL		4th	84	70	.545	12			
1956	AL		4th	84	70	.545	13			
1957	AL		3rd	82	72	.532	16			
1958	AL		3rd	79	75	.513	13		Jackie Jensen (MVP)	
1959	AL		5th	75	79	.487	19			
1960	AL		7th	65	89	.422	32			
1961	AL		6th	76	86	.469	33		Don Schwall (ROY)	
1962	AL		8th	76	84	.475	19			
1963	AL		7th	76	85	.472	28			
1964	AL		8th	72	90	.444	27			
1965	AL		9th	62	100	.383	40			
1966	AL		9th	72	90	.444	26			
1967	AL *		1st	92	70	.568	+1	Lost World Series (Cardinals) 4–3 *	Carl Yastrzemski (MVP, TC); Jim Lonborg (CYA)	
1968	AL		4th	86	76	.531	17			
1969	AL	East	3rd	87	75	.537	22			
1970	AL	East	3rd	87	75	.537	21			
1971	AL	East	3rd	85	77	.525	18			
1972	AL	East	2nd	85	70	.548	1/2		Carlton Fisk (ROY)	
1973	AL	East	2nd	89	73	.549	8			
1974	AL	East	3rd	84	78	.519	7			
1975	AL *	East ^	1st	95	65	.594	+4.5	Won ALCS (Athletics) 3–0; Lost World Series (Reds) 4–3 *	Fred Lynn (MVP, ROY)	
1976	AL	East	3rd	83	79	.512	15 1/2			
1977	AL	East	2nd	97	64	.602	2 1/2			
1978	AL	East	2nd	99	64	.607	1		Jim Rice (MVP)	
1979	AL	East	3rd	91	69	.569	11 1/2			
1980	AL	East	4th	83	77	.519	19			
1981 (Note: The season was partially canceled due to a players' strike that lasted 50 days. See 1981 Major League Baseball strike.)	AL	East	5th	59	49	.546	2 1/2			
1982	AL	East	3rd	89	73	.549	6			
1983	AL	East	6th	78	84	.481	20			
1984	AL	East	4th	86	76	.531	18			
1985	AL	East	6th	81	81	.500	18 1/2			
1986	AL *	East ^	1st	95	66	.590	+5.5	Won ALCS (Angels) 4–3; Lost World Series (Mets) 4–3 *	Roger Clemens (MVP, CYA); John McNamara (MOY)	
1987	AL	East	5th	78	84	.481	20		Roger Clemens (CYA)	
1988	AL	East ^	1st	89	73	.549	+1	Lost ALCS (Athletics) 4–0 ^		
1989	AL	East	3rd	83	79	.512	6			
1990	AL	East ^	1st	88	74	.543	+2	Lost ALCS (Athletics) 4–0 ^		
1991	AL	East	2nd	84	78	.519	7		Roger Clemens (CYA)	
1992	AL	East	7th	73	89	.451	23			
1993	AL	East	5th	80	82	.494	15			
1994 (Note: The season was partially canceled due to a players' strike that lasted 223 days. See 1994–95 Major League Baseball strike.)	AL	East	5th	54	61	.470	17	Playoffs cancelled		
1995	AL	East ^	1st	86	58	.597	+7	Lost ALDS (Indians) 3–0 ^	Mo Vaughn (MVP)	
1996	AL	East	3rd	85	77	.525	7			
1997	AL	East	4th	78	84	.481	20		Nomar Garciaparra (ROY)	
1998	AL	East	2nd ¤	92	70	.568	22	Lost ALDS (Indians) 3–1 ¤		
1999	AL	East	2nd ¤	94	68	.580	4	Won ALDS (Indians) 3–2; Lost ALCS (Yankees) 4–1 ¤	Pedro Martínez (CYA, TC); Jimy Williams (MOY)	
2000	AL	East	2nd	85	77	.525	2 1/2		Pedro Martínez (CYA)	
2001	AL	East	2nd	82	79	.509	13 1/2			
2002	AL	East	2nd	93	69	.574	10 1/2			
2003	AL	East	2nd ¤	95	67	.586	6	Won ALDS (Athletics) 3–2; Lost ALCS (Yankees) 4–3 ¤		
2004 †	AL *	East	2nd ¤	98	64	.605	3	Won ALDS (Angels) 3–0; Won ALCS (Yankees) 4–3; Won World Series (Cardinals) 4–0 †	Manny Ramirez (WS MVP)	
2005	AL	East	2nd ¤	95	67	.586	0 (Note: The Red Sox finished 95–67 and with the same record as the New York Yankees, but since the Yankees had won the season series between the two teams, the Yankees were declared division winners and the Red Sox qualified for the postseason as the American League Wild Card.)	Lost ALDS (White Sox) 3–0 ¤		
2006	AL	East	3rd	86	76	.531	11			
2007 †	AL *	East ^	1st	96	66	.593	+2	Won ALDS (Angels) 3–0; Won ALCS (Indians) 4–3; Won World Series (Rockies) 4–0 †	Dustin Pedroia (ROY); Mike Lowell (WS MVP)	
2008	AL	East	2nd ¤	95	67	.586	2	Won ALDS (Angels) 3–1; Lost ALCS (Rays) 4–3 ¤	Dustin Pedroia (MVP)	
2009	AL	East	2nd ¤	95	67	.586	8	Lost ALDS (Angels) 3–0 ¤		
2010	AL	East	3rd	89	73	.549	7			
2011	AL	East	3rd	90	72	.556	7		Jacoby Ellsbury (CPOY)	
2012	AL	East	5th	69	93	.426	26			
2013 †	AL *	East ^	1st	97	65	.599	+5.5	Won ALDS (Rays) 3–1; Won ALCS (Tigers) 4–2; Won World Series (Cardinals) 4–2 †	David Ortiz (WS MVP)	
2014	AL	East	5th	71	91	.438	25			
2015	AL	East	5th	78	84	.481	15			
2016	AL	East ^	1st	93	69	.574	+4	Lost ALDS (Indians) 3–0 ^	Rick Porcello (CYA, CPOY)	
2017	AL	East ^	1st	93	69	.574	+2	Lost ALDS (Astros) 3–1 ^	Craig Kimbrel (RPOY)	
2018 †	AL *	East ^	1st	108	54	.667	+8	Won ALDS (Yankees) 3–1; Won ALCS (Astros) 4–1; Won World Series (Dodgers) 4–1 †	Steve Pearce (WS MVP); Mookie Betts (MVP); David Price (CPOY)	
2019	AL	East	3rd	84	78	.519	19			
2020	AL	East	5th	24	36	.400	16			
2021	AL	East	2nd ¤	92	70	.568	8	Won ALWC (Yankees); Won ALDS (Rays) 3–1; Lost ALCS (Astros) 4–2 ¤		
2022	AL	East	5th	78	84	.481	21			
2023	AL	East	5th	78	84	.481	23			
2024	AL	East	3rd	81	81	.500	13			
2025	AL	East	3rd ¤	89	73	.549	5	Lost ALWC (Yankees) 2–1 ¤		
2026	AL	East	3rd ¤	87	75	.537	11	Lost ALWC (Yankees) 2–0 ¤		

Season record summary
	Games (Note: Total games count is the sum of wins and losses—consistent with major-league record keeping, tie games are excluded from team records and season standings although individual player statistics are counted.)	Wins	Losses	Pct.
Boston Americans regular season record (1901–1907)	1,020	528	492	.518
Boston Red Sox regular season record (1908–2026)	18,522	9,603	8,919	.518
All-time regular season record (1901–2026)	19,542	10,131	9,411	.518
All-time postseason record	204	109	95	.534
All-time regular and postseason record	19,746	10,240	9,506	.519

Updated through completion of the 2026 postseason.

== Regular season record by decade ==
The number of games scheduled for a full regular season has varied over time, the current 162-game season schedule having been in place since 1961. An exception was 2020, when teams played a reduced 60-game schedule and only faced opponents within their own division as a result of the COVID-19 pandemic.

For reasons including work stoppages or, infrequently, rained out games which are not rescheduled, not all scheduled games are played each season. Excluding 2020, the most recent season during which the Red Sox did not play a full 162-game schedule was when they played 161 games in 2001. (Note: The Red Sox' rained out game against the Yankees on September 10 was not rescheduled as it had no bearing on the postseason.)

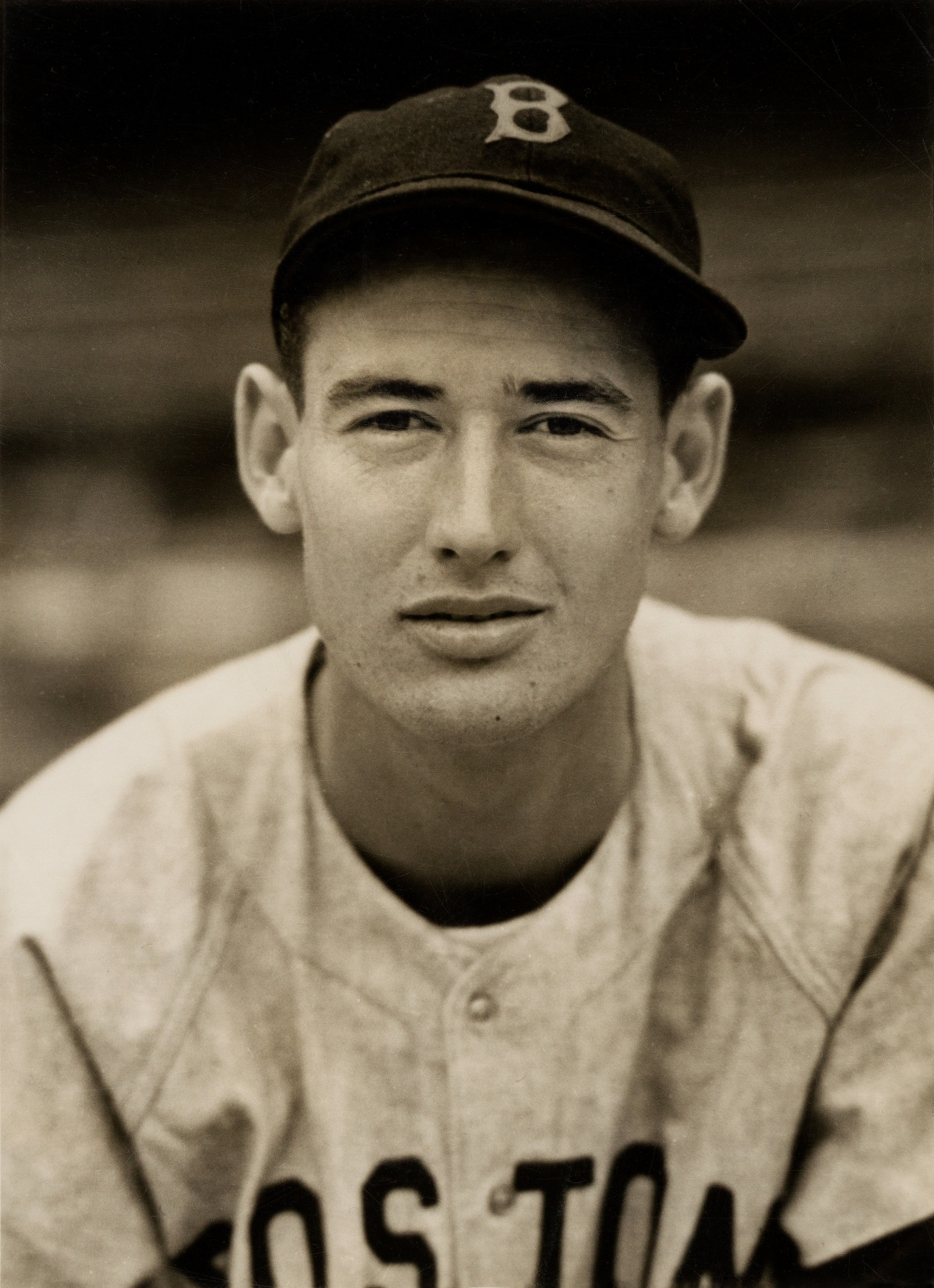
Ted Williams' Red Sox tenure collectively spanned across four decades, from 1939 to 1960.

Regular season record by decade
Decade	Total games	Wins	Losses	Pct.
1900s	1325	691	634	.522
1910s	1481	857	624	.579
1920s	1533	595	938	.388
1930s	1520	705	815	.464
1940s	1537	854	683	.556
1950s	1539	814	725	.529
1960s	1609	764	845	.475
1970s	1609	895	714	.556
1980s	1563	821	742	.525
1990s	1555	814	741	.523
2000s	1619	920	699	.568
2010s	1620	872	748	.538
2020s	1032	529	503	.513
All-time	19,542	10,131	9,411	.518

Updated through completion of the 2026 season.

== Postseason record by year ==
The Red Sox have made the postseason twenty-seven times in their history, with the first being in 1903 and the most recent being in 2026.

Postseason record by year
Year	Finish	Round	Opponent	Result		
1903	World Series Champions	World Series	Pittsburgh Pirates	Won	5	3
1912	World Series Champions	World Series	New York Giants	Won	4	3
1915	World Series Champions	World Series	Philadelphia Phillies	Won	4	1
1916	World Series Champions	World Series	Brooklyn Robins	Won	4	1
1918	World Series Champions	World Series	Chicago Cubs	Won	4	2
1946	American League Champions	World Series	St. Louis Cardinals	Lost	3	4
1967	American League Champions	World Series	St. Louis Cardinals	Lost	3	4
1975	American League Champions	ALCS	Oakland Athletics	Won	3	0
1975	American League Champions	World Series	Cincinnati Reds	Lost	3	4
1986	American League Champions	ALCS	California Angels	Won	4	3
1986	American League Champions	World Series	New York Mets	Lost	3	4
1988	American League East Champions	ALCS	Oakland Athletics	Lost	0	4
1990	American League East Champions	ALCS	Oakland Athletics	Lost	0	4
1995	American League East Champions	ALDS	Cleveland Indians	Lost	0	3
1998	American League Wild Card	ALDS	Cleveland Indians	Lost	1	3
1999	American League Wild Card	ALDS	Cleveland Indians	Won	3	2
1999	American League Wild Card	ALCS	New York Yankees	Lost	1	4
2003	American League Wild Card	ALDS	Oakland Athletics	Won	3	2
2003	American League Wild Card	ALCS	New York Yankees	Lost	3	4
2004	World Series Champions	ALDS	Anaheim Angels	Won	3	0
2004	World Series Champions	ALCS	New York Yankees	Won	4	3
2004	World Series Champions	World Series	St. Louis Cardinals	Won	4	0
2005	American League Wild Card	ALDS	Chicago White Sox	Lost	0	3
2007	World Series Champions	ALDS	Los Angeles Angels	Won	3	0
2007	World Series Champions	ALCS	Cleveland Indians	Won	4	3
2007	World Series Champions	World Series	Colorado Rockies	Won	4	0
2008	American League Wild Card	ALDS	Los Angeles Angels	Won	3	1
2008	American League Wild Card	ALCS	Tampa Bay Rays	Lost	3	4
2009	American League Wild Card	ALDS	Los Angeles Angels	Lost	0	3
2013	World Series Champions	ALDS	Tampa Bay Rays	Won	3	1
2013	World Series Champions	ALCS	Detroit Tigers	Won	4	2
2013	World Series Champions	World Series	St. Louis Cardinals	Won	4	2
2016	American League East Champions	ALDS	Cleveland Indians	Lost	0	3
2017	American League East Champions	ALDS	Houston Astros	Lost	1	3
2018	World Series Champions	ALDS	New York Yankees	Won	3	1
2018	World Series Champions	ALCS	Houston Astros	Won	4	1
2018	World Series Champions	World Series	Los Angeles Dodgers	Won	4	1
2021	American League Wild Card	ALWC	New York Yankees	Won	1	0
2021	American League Wild Card	ALDS	Tampa Bay Rays	Won	3	1
2021	American League Wild Card	ALCS	Houston Astros	Lost	2	4
2025	American League Wild Card	ALWC	New York Yankees	Lost	1	2
2026	American League Wild Card	ALWC	New York Yankees	Lost	0	2
27	Totals			24–18	109	95
