= 1937 Boston Red Sox season =

Major League Baseball season

1937 Boston Red Sox
- League: American League
- Ballpark: Fenway Park
- City: Boston, Massachusetts
- Record: 80–72 (.526)
- League place: 5th
- Owners: Tom Yawkey
- President: Tom Yawkey
- General managers: Eddie Collins
- Managers: Joe Cronin
- Radio: WAAB (Fred Hoey)
- Stats: ESPN.com; Baseball Reference

The 1937 Boston Red Sox season was the 37th season in the franchise's Major League Baseball history. The Red Sox finished fifth in the American League (AL) with a record of 80 wins and 72 losses, 21 games behind the New York Yankees, who went on to win the 1937 World Series.

== Regular season ==
=== Season standings ===
American League
Team	W	L	Pct.	GB	Home	Road
New York Yankees	102	52	.662	—	57‍–‍20	45‍–‍32
Detroit Tigers	89	65	.578	13	49‍–‍28	40‍–‍37
Chicago White Sox	86	68	.558	16	47‍–‍30	39‍–‍38
Cleveland Indians	83	71	.539	19	50‍–‍28	33‍–‍43
Boston Red Sox	80	72	.526	21	44‍–‍29	36‍–‍43
Washington Senators	73	80	.477	28½	43‍–‍35	30‍–‍45
Philadelphia Athletics	54	97	.358	46½	27‍–‍50	27‍–‍47
St. Louis Browns	46	108	.299	56	25‍–‍51	21‍–‍57

=== Record vs. opponents ===
1937 American League record Sources:
Team	BOS	CWS	CLE	DET	NYY	PHA	SLB	WSH
Boston	—	10–12	11–11	12–10–1	7–15	17–3	15–7	8–14–1
Chicago	12–10	—	10–12	8–14	9–13	15–7	18–4	14–8
Cleveland	11–11	12–10	—	11–11	7–15–1	13–9	18–4–1	11–11
Detroit	10–12–1	14–8	11–11	—	9–13	14–8	15–7	16–6
New York	15–7	13–9	15–7–1	13–9	—	14–8	16–6–1	16–6–1
Philadelphia	3–17	7–15	9–13	8–14	8–14	—	11–11	8–13–3
St. Louis	7–15	4–18	4–18–1	7–15	6–16–1	11–11	—	7–15
Washington	14–8–1	8–14	11–11	6–16	6–16–1	13–8–3	15–7	—

=== Opening Day lineup ===
9	Bobby Doerr	2B
8	Doc Cramer	CF
19	Fabian Gaffke	RF
4	Joe Cronin	SS
5	Pinky Higgins	3B
2	Rick Ferrell	C
7	Buster Mills	LF
1	Mel Almada	1B
12	Wes Ferrell	P

=== Roster ===
1937 Boston Red Sox
Roster
Pitchers: 12 Wes Ferrell; 19 Joe Gonzales; 10 Lefty Grove; 21 Jim Henry; 11 Johnny Marcum; 20 Archie McKain; 12 Bobo Newsom; 28 Ted Olson; 14 Fritz Ostermueller; 32 Tommy Thomas; 15 Rube Walberg; 18 Jack Wilson	Catchers: 22 Moe Berg; 23 Gene Desautels; 2 Rick Ferrell; 23 Johnny Peacock; Infielders: 4 Joe Cronin; 9 Bobby Doerr; 3 Jimmie Foxx; 5 Pinky Higgins; 6 Eric McNair; 24 Ski Melillo	Outfielders: 1 Mel Almada; 1 Ben Chapman; 8 Doc Cramer; 16 Dom Dallessandro; 19 Fabian Gaffke; 7 Buster Mills; Other batters: 32 Stew Bowers; 21 Bob Daughters	Manager: 4 Joe Cronin; Coaches: 30 Tom Daly (Third base); 27 Bing Miller (Bench); 31 Herb Pennock (Pitching)

== Player stats ==
=== Batting ===
==== Starters by position ====
Note: Pos = Position; G = Games played; AB = At bats; H = Hits; Avg. = Batting average; HR = Home runs; RBI = Runs batted in

Pos	Player	G	AB	H	Avg.	HR	RBI
C	Gene Desautels	96	305	74	.243	0	27
1B	Jimmie Foxx	150	569	162	.285	36	127
2B	Eric McNair	126	455	133	.292	12	76
SS	Joe Cronin	148	570	175	.307	18	110
3B	Pinky Higgins	153	570	172	.302	9	106
OF	Doc Cramer	133	560	171	.305	0	51
OF	Ben Chapman	113	423	130	.307	7	57
OF	Buster Mills	123	505	149	.295	7	58

==== Other batters ====
Note: G = Games played; AB = At bats; H = Hits; Avg. = Batting average; HR = Home runs; RBI = Runs batted in

Player	G	AB	H	Avg.	HR	RBI
Fabian Gaffke	54	184	53	.288	6	34
Dom Dallessandro	68	147	34	.231	0	11
Bobby Doerr	55	147	33	.224	2	14
Moe Berg	47	141	36	.255	0	20
Mel Almada	32	110	26	.236	1	9
Rick Ferrell	18	65	20	.308	1	4
Ski Melillo	26	56	14	.250	0	6
Johnny Peacock	9	32	10	.313	0	6
Stew Bowers	1	0	0	----	0	0
Bob Daughters	1	0	0	----	0	0

=== Pitching ===
==== Starting pitchers ====
Note: G = Games pitched; IP = Innings pitched; W = Wins; L = Losses; ERA = Earned run average; SO = Strikeouts

Player	G	IP	W	L	ERA	SO
Lefty Grove	32	262.0	17	9	3.02	153
Bobo Newsom	30	207.2	13	10	4.46	127
Wes Ferrell	12	73.1	3	6	7.61	31

==== Other pitchers ====
Note: G = Games pitched; IP = Innings pitched; W = Wins; L = Losses; ERA = Earned run average; SO = Strikeouts

Player	G	IP	W	L	ERA	SO
Jack Wilson	51	221.1	16	10	3.70	137
Johnny Marcum	37	183.2	13	11	4.85	59
Archie McKain	36	137.0	8	8	4.66	66
Rube Walberg	32	104.2	5	7	5.59	46
Fritz Ostermueller	25	86.2	3	7	4.98	29
Joe Gonzales	8	31.0	1	2	4.35	11
Jim Henry	3	15.1	1	0	5.28	8

==== Relief pitchers ====
Note: G = Games pitched; W = Wins; L = Losses; SV = Saves; ERA = Earned run average; SO = Strikeouts

Player	G	W	L	SV	ERA	SO
Ted Olson	11	0	0	0	7.24	11
Tommy Thomas	9	0	2	0	4.09	4

== Farm system ==
Level	Team	League	Manager
A1	Little Rock Travelers	Southern Association	Doc Prothro
A	Hazleton Red Sox	New York–Pennsylvania League	Specs Toporcer
B	Rocky Mount Red Sox	Piedmont League	Nemo Leibold
C	Brockville Blues	Canadian–American League	Jesse Spring and John Grilli
C	Clarksdale Red Sox	Cotton States League	Red Barnes
C	Canton Terriers	Middle Atlantic League	Floyd "Pat" Patterson
D	Elizabethton Betsy Red Sox	Appalachian League	Hobe Brummette
D	Danville-Schoolfield Leafs	Bi-State League	Herb Brett
D	Opelousas Indians	Evangeline League	Harry Strohm
D	Moultrie Packers	Georgia–Florida League	Grant Gillis
D	Mansfield Red Sox	Ohio State League	Dewey Stover

LEAGUE CHAMPIONS: Little Rock, Canton, Mansfield
