= Charlie Wagner =

American baseball player (1912–2006)

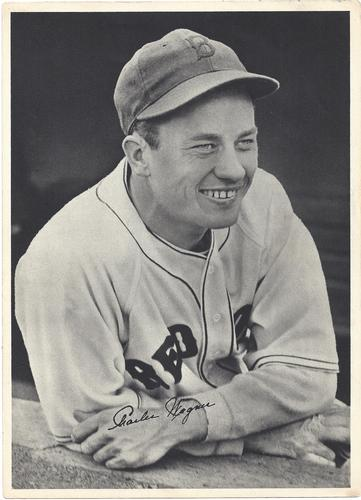
- Pitcher
- Born: December 3, 1912; Reading, Pennsylvania, U.S.
- Died: August 31, 2006 (aged 93); Reading, Pennsylvania, U.S.
- Batted: Right Threw: Right

MLB debut
- April 19, 1938, for the Boston Red Sox

Last MLB appearance
- August 8, 1946, for the Boston Red Sox

MLB statistics
- Win–loss record: 32–23
- Earned run average: 3.91
- Strikeouts: 157
- Stats at Baseball Reference

Teams
- Boston Red Sox (1938–1942, 1946)

Charles Thomas Wagner (December 3, 1912 – August 31, 2006) was an American right-handed pitcher in Major League Baseball who played his entire, 100-game career for the Boston Red Sox (1938–42, 1946). Nicknamed "Broadway," after his playing retirement he went on to a 60-year career as a farm system supervisor, scout, major-league pitching coach and minor-league instructor. His professional relationship with the Red Sox lasted a record 73 years.

== Playing career ==
Born in Reading, Pennsylvania, Wagner signed with the Red Sox in 1935 and made his MLB pitching debut on April 19, 1938. After being used in both starting and relief duties, he enjoyed his first full season as a starter in 1941. He was the second in a pitching rotation that included Dick Newsome, Mickey Harris and Lefty Grove. Wagner finished with a 12–8 record and three shutouts, and his 3.07 earned run average was the best on the Boston pitching staff and the third best in the American League, being surpassed only by Thornton Lee (2.37) and Al Benton (2.97), and over Marius Russo (3.09).

In 1942, Wagner compiled career-highs in victories (14, eighth in AL), starts (26), complete games (17, seventh in AL), strikeouts (52), innings pitched (205 1/3), and had a 3.29 ERA. After the season, he left his team to serve in the Navy during World War II. Wagner returned to the Red Sox in 1946, along with teammates Ted Williams, Dom DiMaggio, Bobby Doerr, Johnny Pesky, Tex Hughson and Joe Dobson. He pitched his final game on August 8, 1946, ending with a 1–0 mark in 30 2/3 innings.

In a six-season career, Wagner posted a 32–23 record with 157 strikeouts and a 3.91 earned run average in 527 2/3 innings pitched.

Although posting only a .118 batting average (20-for-170) with just 8 RBI in his major league career, he was an excellent fielding pitcher, recording a .992 fielding percentage with only one error in 127 total chances. His only miscue occurred August 8, 1941 in the fifth inning against the Senators at Fenway Park on an errant pickoff throw.

== Later life ==
Following his retirement as a player, Wagner became the Red Sox' assistant director of minor league operations from 1947 to 1960. He then scouted for Boston from 1961 to 1969 and from 1971 to 1992. He was the Red Sox' MLB pitching coach for the 1970 season, on the staff of first-year manager Eddie Kasko. He later worked as a special assignment instructor in the Red Sox minor league system, and was still consulted about the organization's prospects into his 90s. He was a staple for years at Reading Phillies games in his hometown, where the press box was named in his honor in 2000. He was crowned as the inaugural "King of Baseballtown" by Reading club in 2003 as he entered the Reading Baseball Hall of Fame in 1992.

Wagner appeared before the Boston faithful on Opening Day 2005. He spoke to the crowd, "Let's Play Ball." Wagner died a year later in 2006 at age 93 after suffering a heart attack in his car following a Reading Phillies game.

== Trivia ==
- Wagner and Ted Williams were roommates as members of the Boston Red Sox.

== Notes ==
| Preceded by Darrell Johnson | Boston Red Sox pitching coach 1970 | Succeeded by Harvey Haddix |
