= Mickey Harris =

American baseball player (1917–1971)

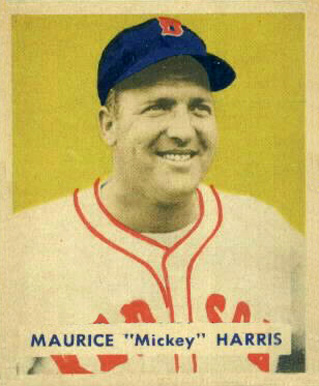
- Pitcher
- Born: January 30, 1917; New York City, New York, U.S.
- Died: April 15, 1971 (aged 54); Farmington, Michigan, U.S.
- Batted: Left Threw: Left

MLB debut
- April 23, 1940, for the Boston Red Sox

Last MLB appearance
- September 3, 1952, for the Cleveland Indians

MLB statistics
- Win–loss record: 59–71
- Earned run average: 4.18
- Strikeouts: 534
- Stats at Baseball Reference

Teams
- Boston Red Sox (1940–1941, 1946–1949); Washington Senators (1949–1952); Cleveland Indians (1952)

Career highlights and awards
- All-Star (1946)

Maurice Charles "Mickey" Harris (January 30, 1917 – April 15, 1971) was an American professional baseball player. He was a pitcher in Major League Baseball (MLB) for nine seasons with the Boston Red Sox, Washington Senators, and Cleveland Indians between 1940 and 1952. Born in New York City, he batted and threw left-handed. Though plagued by chronic arm problems, Harris helped the Red Sox win the 1946 American League pennant en route to the 1946 World Series against the St. Louis Cardinals.

== Biography ==
Harris began his professional career in Minor League Baseball during the 1938–1940 seasons playing for farm teams of the Boston Red Sox. He made his major-league debut with the Red Sox in 1940. He joined the starting rotation in 1941, along with Dick Newsome, Charlie Wagner, Lefty Grove and Joe Dobson. Harris responded with a 3.25 ERA and 111 strikeouts (8th and 5th in the AL, respectively), and his 8–14 record could have been even better with reasonable run support. After the season, he was drafted into the United States Army.

After being out of professional baseball for four seasons, Harris compiled a 17–9 record in 1946, as the Red Sox ran away with the pennant. In May, Harris posted eight consecutive victories, including two in relief in two days. He was named to the AL All-Star team in the same season. After that, Harris increased arm troubles and was traded to the Washington Senators in the 1949 midseason.

In 1950, Harris led the AL pitchers in saves (15), relief appearances (53) and games finished (53). He played for the Cleveland Indians in 1952, his final season in the major leagues.

In a nine-season major-league career, Harris posted a 59–71 record with 534 strikeouts and a 4.18 ERA in 1050 innings pitched.

Harris died in 1971 in Farmington, Michigan, at 54 years of age.

== See also ==
- List of Major League Baseball annual saves leaders
