= Bob Daughters =

American baseball player (1914–1988)

- Pinch runner
- Born: August 5, 1914; Cincinnati, Ohio, U.S.
- Died: August 22, 1988 (aged 74); Southbury, Connecticut, U.S.
- Batted: Right Threw: Right

MLB debut
- April 24, 1937, for the Boston Red Sox

Last MLB appearance
- April 24, 1937, for the Boston Red Sox

MLB statistics
- Games played: 1
- At bats: 0
- Runs scored: 1
- Stats at Baseball Reference

Teams
- Boston Red Sox (1937)

Robert Francis "Red" Daughters (August 5, 1914 – August 22, 1988) was an American professional baseball player. He played in one game in Major League Baseball with the Boston Red Sox in 1937. Listed at 6 ft 2 in (1.88 m), 185 lb., Daughters batted and threw right-handed.

== Biography ==
Daughters was born in Cincinnati, Ohio, but grew up in the Boston area. He graduated from Watertown High School, and attended Holy Cross, where he was a star third-baseman and also a "great pass receiver" on the football team. While at Holy Cross, he played summer baseball in 1934 and 1935 for the Bourne town team in the Cape Cod Baseball League, where it was reported that he "is probably the fastest man in the league on the bases, has a fine, accurate throwing arm and is a consistent hitter."

Daughters was signed by the Boston Red Sox in 1937, and was immediately brought to the major leagues. On April 24, in the home opener at Fenway Park, he was brought in to pinch run for Rick Ferrell in the tenth inning against the New York Yankees. The Red Sox had started their Hall of Fame hurler Lefty Grove, but were tied 4–4 with New York after nine. In the top of the tenth, Boston reliever Fritz Ostermueller was tagged for two runs as Yankee Hall of Famers Lou Gehrig, Bill Dickey, and Tony Lazzeri mounted a rally, capped by a triple off the bat of George Selkirk. The Red Sox also rallied in their half of the inning, as Pinky Higgins led off with a double off Yankee moundsman Johnny Murphy, who proceeded to walk Ferrell. Running for Ferrell, Daughters moved to second on a fielder's choice, then to third on a walk to Mel Almada. Another fielder's choice scored Daughters and left a man on third with two out for Boston Hall of Famer Bobby Doerr, who flied out to left field to kill the rally and send the Yankees home 6–5 winners.

Daughters never again appeared in the majors, spending the rest of the 1937 season with the minor league Rocky Mount Red Sox and Hazleton Red Sox, where he was primarily an outfielder. He also played minor league ball in 1938 and 1942 before retiring. During World War II he served as a lieutenant in the United States Navy.

Daughters served as President of the Holy Cross Varsity Club between 1961 and 1962, and was inducted into the Holy Cross athletic hall of fame in 1967. He died in Southbury, Connecticut in 1988 at age 74.

== Sources ==
- Career statistics from Baseball Reference · Baseball Reference (Minors) · Retrosheet · Baseball Almanac
- Holy Cross Athletics Archived 2007-08-14 at the Wayback Machine
- Retrosheet
- Bob Daughters biography from Society for American Baseball Research (SABR)
