= Frankie Pytlak =

American baseball player (1908–1977)

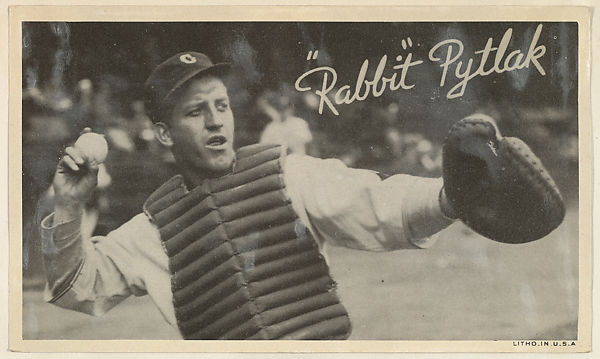
- Catcher
- Born: July 30, 1908; Buffalo, New York, U.S.
- Died: May 8, 1977 (aged 68); Buffalo, New York, U.S.
- Batted: Right Threw: Right

MLB debut
- April 22, 1932, for the Cleveland Indians

Last MLB appearance
- April 25, 1946, for the Boston Red Sox

MLB statistics
- Batting average: .282
- Home runs: 7
- Runs batted in: 272
- Stats at Baseball Reference

Teams
- Cleveland Indians (1932–1940); Boston Red Sox (1941, 1945–1946)

Frank Anthony Pytlak (July 30, 1908 – May 8, 1977), nicknamed "Rabbit", was an American professional baseball player. He played in Major League Baseball as a catcher for the Cleveland Indians (1932–40) and Boston Red Sox (1941 and 1945–46). He was known as a line drive hitter and an excellent defensive catcher.

== Playing career ==
Pytlak was born in Buffalo, New York. He made his major league debut with the Cleveland Indians on April 22, 1932, before being sent back down to the minor leagues with the Toledo Mud Hens. In 1933 he was back with the Indians as a reserve catcher, playing behind Roy Spencer. From 1934 to 1936, Pytlak played mostly as a reserve although, he did lead Indians catchers in games caught in the 1934 season. He became the Indians starting catcher in 1937, posting a .315 batting average in 125 games.

On August 20, 1938, as part of a publicity stunt by the Come to Cleveland Committee, Pytlak, along with Indians' rookie catcher, Hank Helf, successfully caught baseballs dropped from Cleveland's 708-foot-tall (216 m) Terminal Tower by Indians' third baseman Ken Keltner. The 708-foot (216 m) drop broke the 555-foot, 30-year-old record set by Washington Senator catcher Gabby Street at the Washington Monument. The baseballs were estimated to have been traveling at 138 miles per hour when caught.

Pytlak was the Indians' catcher on October 2, 1938, when Bob Feller set a modern major league record of 18 strikeouts against the Detroit Tigers. Between September 10, 1938, and September 18, 1940, Pytlak handled 571 consecutive chances for the Indians without an error, erasing the previous major league mark of 452 set by Gabby Hartnett of the Chicago Cubs. A rivalry between Pytlak and Rollie Hemsley for the Indians starting catcher's role erupted during spring training in 1939, with Pytlak threatening to quit the team if he wasn't named the team's number one catcher. Pytlak was also resentful of Hemsley when, the latter became known as Bob Feller's personal catcher during the 1938 season. When Pytlak suffered an injury in the 1939 season, Hemsley replaced him as the Indians' starting catcher, and played well enough to keep Pytlak from regaining the number one position. Even so, Indians' pitcher Johnny Allen refused to pitch unless Pytlak was the catcher.

Pytlak was traded to the Boston Red Sox in 1941 where he became the starting catcher, replacing Gene Desautels. He was expecting to be drafted in 1942, so he contacted Mickey Cochrane at the Great Lakes Naval Training Center outside Chicago, where Cochrane ran a baseball team for the United States Navy. He joined the athletic division there on April 17, 1942, and spent the summer playing for the Great Lakes team and batted .319 in 40 games. He also played for the Military All-Stars at Cleveland on July 7, 1942. Early in 1943, Pytlak was transferred to the navy recruiting station in Buffalo, where he served for the remainder of the war.

By the time World War II had ended in 1945, Pytlak was 37 years old. He rejoined the Red Sox and played nine games before the season finished. The following year he was used sparingly, appearing in only four games and was released in August 1946.

== Career statistics ==
In a twelve-year major league career, Pytlak played in 795 games accumulating 677 hits in 2,399 at bats for a .282 career batting average along with 7 home runs, 272 runs batted in, a .355 on-base percentage and a .363 slugging percentage. He had a batting average over .300 for three consecutive seasons between 1936 and 1938. Pytlak led American League catchers in 1933 with a caught stealing percentage of 62.7%, the tenth highest single-season average in major league history. In 1937, he led American League catchers with 80 assists and 40 baserunners caught stealing. Pytlak led the American League in hit by pitch (5) in 1934. His .991 career fielding percentage was 9 points above the league average during his career, and at the time of his retirement in 1946, was the highest career average by a catcher in major league baseball history.

== Managing career and retirement ==
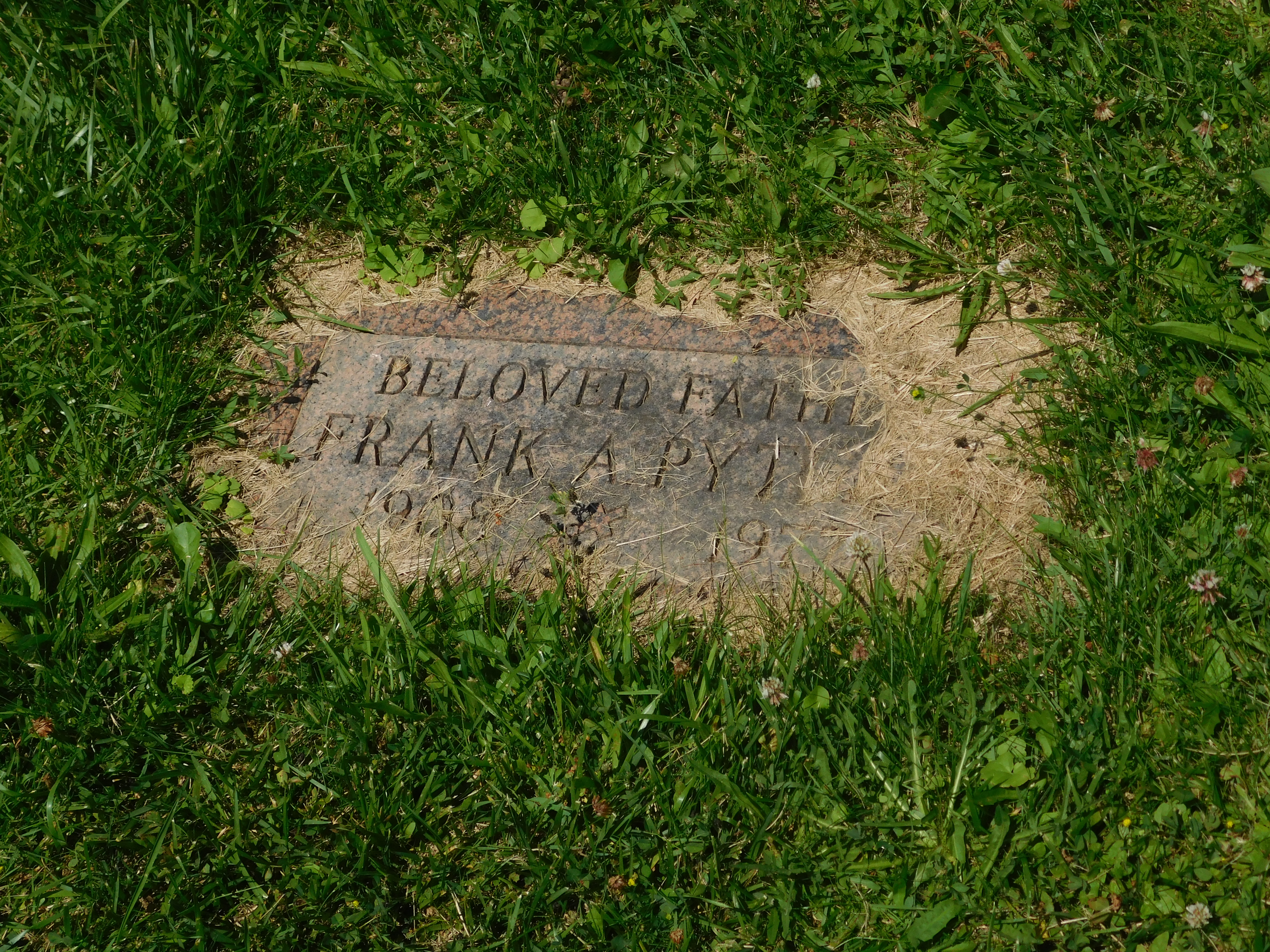
The grave of Frank Pytlak at St. Stanislaus Cemetery, Cheektowaga, New York

Pytlak managed the Providence Grays of the Class B New England League for a year before he quit organized baseball and coached high school baseball for some time. Later in life, he worked at a sporting goods store in Buffalo.

Pytlak died in Buffalo, New York on May 8, 1977. He was 68 years old and is buried at the St. Stanislaus Cemetery.
