= Tom Carey (second baseman) =

American baseball player (1906–1970)

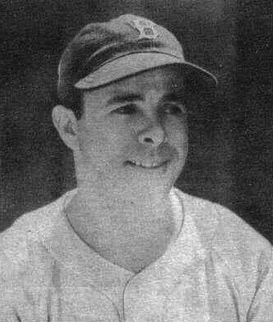
- Second baseman
- Born: October 11, 1906; Hoboken, New Jersey, U.S.
- Died: February 21, 1970 (aged 63); Rochester, New York, U.S.
- Batted: Right Threw: Right

MLB debut
- July 19, 1935, for the St. Louis Browns

Last MLB appearance
- July 7, 1946, for the Boston Red Sox

MLB statistics
- Batting average: .275
- Home runs: 2
- Runs batted in: 167
- Stats at Baseball Reference

Teams
- St. Louis Browns (1935–1937); Boston Red Sox (1939–1942, 1946)

Thomas Francis Aloysius Carey (October 11, 1906 – February 21, 1970) was an American second baseman who played in Major League Baseball between 1935 and 1946. Nicknamed "Scoops" for his defensive ability, Carey batted and threw right-handed. He was listed as 5 feet 8 inches (1.73 m) tall and 170 pounds (77 kg).

The native of Hoboken, New Jersey, began his professional baseball career with the Chambersburg Young Yanks of the Blue Ridge League in 1930. He had a batting average of .306 that year, a personal best. He then was acquired by the St. Louis Cardinals' organization and toiled in their system for five years, including three with the top-level Rochester Red Wings.

Carey reached the majors in 1936 with the Cardinals' American League rivals, the St. Louis Browns, spending three years with them before moving to the Boston Red Sox (1939–42; 1946). His most productive season came in his rookie season with the Browns, when he hit .273 and posted career-highs in runs (58), RBI (57), doubles (27), triples (6) and games played (134). In an eight-season career, Carey was a .275 hitter with 418 hits, two home runs and 167 RBI in 466 games.

Carey missed the 1943–45 baseball seasons while serving in the United States Navy during World War II. In 1946, he returned to the Red Sox, but played only three games before joining the coaching staff of manager Joe Cronin for the balance of the season, during which Boston won the AL pennant. He then worked briefly in the Red Sox' farm system as a coach and manager.

He died in Rochester, New York, at the age of 63.
