= Al Flair =

American baseball player (1916–1988)

- First baseman
- Born: July 24, 1916; New Orleans, Louisiana
- Died: July 26, 1988 (aged 72); New Orleans, Louisiana
- Batted: Left Threw: Left

MLB debut
- September 6, 1941, for the Boston Red Sox

Last MLB appearance
- September 28, 1941, for the Boston Red Sox

MLB statistics
- At-bats: 30
- Triples: 1
- Batting average: .200
- Stats at Baseball Reference

Teams
- Boston Red Sox (1941)

Albert Dell Flair (July 24, 1916 – July 26, 1988) nicknamed "Broadway", was a first baseman in Major League Baseball who played briefly for the Boston Red Sox during the 1941 season. Listed at 6 ft 4 in (1.93 m), 195 lb., Flair batted and threw left-handed. He was born in New Orleans, Louisiana.

In one-season career, Flair was a .200 hitter (6-for-30) with three runs and two RBI in 10 games, including two doubles, one triple, and one stolen base. He did not hit a home run.

Flair played first base for the New Orleans Pelicans, a Pittsburgh Pirates farm team, in the Double-A Southern Association for several years following WWII, where he was the team's leading home-run hitter. Following his retirement from baseball he became a referee in college basketball games.

Flair died in his home of New Orleans, Louisiana, in 1988.

== Sources ==
- Baseball Reference
- Retrosheet
