= Paul Campbell (first baseman) =

American baseball player (1917–2006)

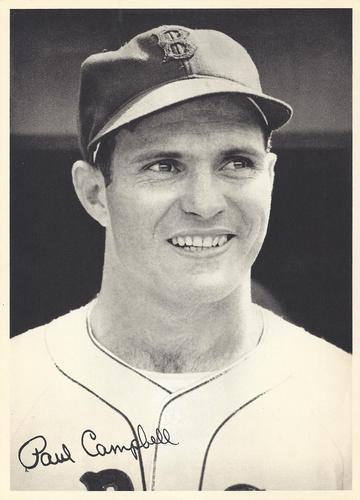
- First baseman
- Born: September 1, 1917; Paw Creek, North Carolina, U.S.
- Died: June 22, 2006 (aged 88); Charlotte, North Carolina, U.S.
- Batted: Left Threw: Left

MLB debut
- April 15, 1941, for the Boston Red Sox

Last MLB appearance
- May 14, 1950, for the Detroit Tigers

MLB statistics
- Batting average: .255
- Home runs: 4
- Runs batted in: 41
- Stats at Baseball Reference

Teams
- Boston Red Sox (1941–1942, 1946); Detroit Tigers (1948–1950)

Paul McLaughlin Campbell (September 1, 1917 – June 22, 2006) was an American professional baseball player, manager, scout and front office executive. He appeared in the Major Leagues as a first baseman with the Boston Red Sox and Detroit Tigers, then served as a scout and traveling secretary for the Cincinnati Reds. He spent 57 continuous years in professional baseball.

Campbell was born in Paw Creek, North Carolina, the only son of Charles Davis Campbell and Fannie Cooper Campbell. He broke into professional baseball in 1936 and debuted in the Majors in 1941 with the Red Sox. From 1943 to 1945, he served in the United States Army Air Forces in England, and played on a team that toured the British air bases.

Campbell rejoined the Red Sox in 1946 and made an appearance in the 1946 World Series against the St. Louis Cardinals. During 1948–49, he played with the Detroit Tigers. He then worked with minor league teams as coach, manager and club president throughout the 1950s. Campbell began a long career with the Cincinnati Reds in 1958 when he became a scout. In 1964 he was promoted to traveling secretary for the Reds, remaining with that position until 1978.

Paul married Mary Ellen Shannon on November 16, 1940, in Charlotte. Following her death in 1961, he married Lillian McCord Taylor in Charlotte. He had one daughter, Marilyn Campbell Sherman, and two stepchildren, DeVera Goodson and Vincent Taylor.
