= Dick Newsome =

American baseball player (1909–1965)

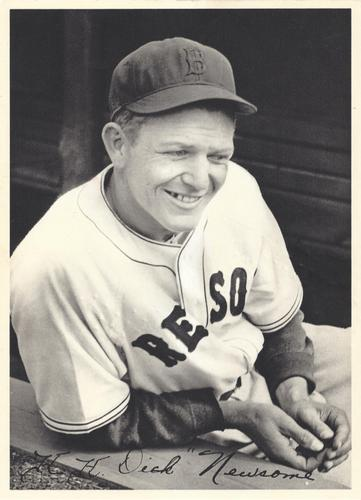
- Pitcher
- Born: December 13, 1909; Ahoskie, North Carolina, U.S.
- Died: December 15, 1965 (aged 56); Ahoskie, North Carolina, U.S.
- Batted: Right Threw: Right

MLB debut
- April 25, 1941, for the Boston Red Sox

Last MLB appearance
- September 27, 1943, for the Boston Red Sox

MLB statistics
- Win–loss record: 35–33
- Earned run average: 4.50
- Strikeouts: 138
- Stats at Baseball Reference

Teams
- Boston Red Sox (1941–1943)

Heber Hampton Newsome (December 13, 1909 – December 15, 1965) was an American starting pitcher in Major League Baseball who played his entire career for the Boston Red Sox between the 1941 and 1943 seasons. Listed at 6 ft 0 in (1.83 m), 185 lb., Newsome batted and threw right-handed. A native of Ahoskie, North Carolina, he graduated from Wake Forest University.

In his rookie year, Newsome won 19 games (third in the American League) and compiled 10 shutouts, leading a Red Sox pitching rotation that included Charlie Wagner, Mickey Harris, Joe Dobson and Lefty Grove. He was considered for the MVP Award, ending ninth in the ballot.

But Newsome slumped badly the next two years, winning only eight games in each of them. After the 1943 season, he served in the Army during World War II, and then returned to his farm.

In a three-season career, Newsome posted a 35–33 record with 138 strikeouts and a 4.50 ERA in 526.0 innings pitched.

Newsome died in an automobile accident in Ahoskie, North Carolina, just two days after he turned 56 years old.

== Sources ==
- Career statistics from Baseball Reference · Fangraphs · Baseball Reference (Minors) · Retrosheet · Baseball Almanac
