= Jim Tabor =

American baseball player (1916–1953)

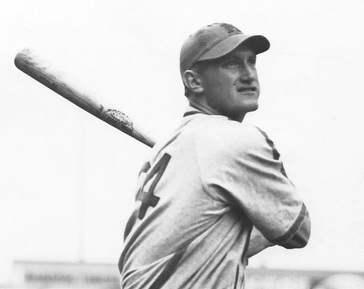
- Tabor, circa 1938
- Third baseman
- Born: November 5, 1916; New Hope, Alabama, U.S.
- Died: August 22, 1953 (aged 36); Sacramento, California, U.S.
- Batted: Right Threw: Right

MLB debut
- August 2, 1938, for the Boston Red Sox

Last MLB appearance
- September 17, 1947, for the Philadelphia Phillies

MLB statistics
- Batting average: .270
- Home runs: 104
- Runs batted in: 598
- Stats at Baseball Reference

Teams
- Boston Red Sox (1938–1944); Philadelphia Phillies (1946–1947)

James Reubin Tabor (November 5, 1916 – August 22, 1953), nicknamed "Rawhide", was an American Major League Baseball player, a third baseman for the Boston Red Sox (1938–44) and Philadelphia Phillies (1946–47). Born in New Hope, Alabama, he batted and threw right-handed, stood 6 feet 2 inches (1.88 m) tall and weighed 175 pounds (79 kg).

== Productive Major League hitter ==
Tabor attended the University of Alabama. He came to the Red Sox late in 1938 after two stellar minor league seasons and hit .316 (18-for-57) in 19 games. The next year he was the Bosox' regular third baseman. He appeared in 149 games and had a .280 batting average, highest of his MLB career, with 14 home runs and 95 runs batted in.

In 1940 Tabor collected a career-high 21 home runs with 81 RBI, with 16 homers and a career-high 101 RBI in 1941. He remained with Boston until the end of the 1944 campaign, when he was inducted into the United States Army. After missing the 1945 campaign, he was discharged from military service and then sold to the Phillies on January 22, 1946. After two years in Philadelphia, Tabor was sent to the minor leagues. His Major League career was marked by numerous suspensions for "breaking training rules," and one teammate, Doc Cramer, alleged that Tabor would come to the ballpark still "half drunk" from his nights on the town; the Red Sox hired private detectives to unsuccessfully try to control Tabor's behavior.

Tabor was a career .270 hitter with 1,021 hits, 104 home runs and 598 RBI in 1,005 games. He led American League third basemen in assists (1939) and putouts (1942), and in errors for five consecutive seasons (1939–43).

His last active seasons were spent with Los Angeles, Sacramento and Portland in the Pacific Coast League until his retirement in 1952. Tabor died of a heart attack in Sacramento, California, at the age of 36.

== Highlights ==
- Hit four home runs in a double-header against the Philadelphia Athletics, collecting 19 bases and 11 RBI. Three of his homers came in the second game, including a record-tying two grand slams in consecutive innings (July 4, 1939). His 11 RBI is the AL single day record.

== See also ==
- List of Major League Baseball hitters with two grand slams in one game
