= Yank Terry =

American baseball player (1911–1979)

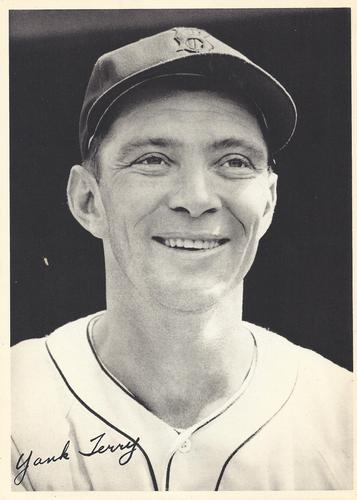
- Pitcher
- Born: February 11, 1911; Bedford, Indiana, U.S.
- Died: November 4, 1979 (aged 68); Bloomington, Indiana, U.S.
- Batted: Right Threw: Right

MLB debut
- August 3, 1940, for the Boston Red Sox

Last MLB appearance
- July 20, 1945, for the Boston Red Sox

MLB statistics
- Win–loss record: 20–28
- Earned run average: 4.09
- Strikeouts: 167
- Stats at Baseball Reference

Teams
- Boston Red Sox (1940, 1942–1945)

Lancelot "Yank" Terry (February 11, 1911 – November 4, 1979) was an American pitcher in Major League Baseball who played his entire career for the Boston Red Sox (1940, 1942–1945). He batted and threw right-handed.

He made his big league debut on August 3, 1940, during a double-header against the Detroit Tigers at Tiger Stadium. Terry picked up his first career win on August 17, 1940, at Fenway Park against the Washington Senators in a 12–9 win in front of 7,800 fans.

Terry's final appearance in the big leagues came July 20, 1945 during a 6–3 Red Sox loss to the visiting Chicago White Sox in front of 4,284 fans.

In a five-year career, Terry posted a 20–28 record with 167 strikeouts and a 4.09 ERA in 457.1 innings.

Yank Terry died in Bloomington, Indiana, at the age of 68. He is buried in Cresthaven Cemetery in Bedford, Indiana.
