= Oscar Judd =

Canadian baseball player (1908–1995)

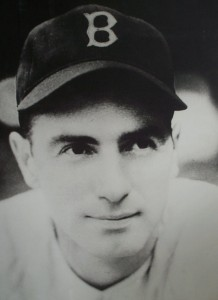
- Pitcher
- Born: February 14, 1908; London, Ontario, Canada
- Died: December 27, 1995 (aged 87); Ingersoll, Ontario, Canada
- Batted: Left Threw: Left

MLB debut
- April 16, 1941, for the Boston Red Sox

Last MLB appearance
- May 11, 1948, for the Philadelphia Phillies

MLB statistics
- Win–loss record: 40–51
- Earned run average: 3.90
- Strikeouts: 304
- Stats at Baseball Reference

Teams
- Boston Red Sox (1941–1945); Philadelphia Phillies (1945–1948)

Career highlights and awards
- All-Star (1943)

Member of the Canadian

Baseball Hall of Fame
- Induction: 1986

Thomas William Oscar Judd (February 14, 1908 – December 27, 1995) was a Canadian-born professional baseball pitcher. He played in Major League Baseball (MLB) for the Boston Red Sox and Philadelphia Phillies. Listed at 6 feet 1/2 inch (1.842 m) and 180 pounds (82 kg), he threw and batted left-handed.

== Biography ==
Judd's pro career began in 1934 at age 26. He appeared for the Los Angeles Angels of the Pacific Coast League in one game, then joined the vast St. Louis Cardinals farm system. By 1940, at age 32, he had returned to the PCL, where he won 22 games for the Redbirds' Sacramento Solons affiliate. That autumn, he was selected by the Boston Red Sox in the Rule 5 draft.

Judd was primarily used as a starting pitcher during his eight-season major-league career. He made his major-league debut on April 16, 1941, in relief for the Red Sox against the Washington Senators at Fenway Park. He pitched in just six more games for Boston that year but did earn his first major-league save.

His first major-league win came in his second season and second major league start, a 13–4 victory over the Senators at Griffith Stadium on April 22, 1942. The losing pitcher was Hall of Famer Early Wynn. Judd finished the season 8–10 with a 3.89 earned run average (ERA).

Judd's best season was 1943. The 36-year-old was 11–6 with a 2.90 ERA and was an American League All-Star. Two years later, on May 31, 1945, he was selected off waivers by the Philadelphia Phillies from the Red Sox. His overall record for Boston in five seasons was 20–18 with an ERA of 3.68 in 72 games.

His best season with Philadelphia was 1946, when he won 11 games, lost 12, and had a .316 batting average for a mediocre Phillies team that finished in fifth place with a 69–85 record. He finished in a tie for 36th place in the National League MVP voting.

Judd was 40 years old when he made his final major league appearance on May 11, 1948. He was the sixth-oldest player to appear in a National League game that season.

Career totals for 206 games (161 as a pitcher) include a 40–51 record, 99 games started, 43 complete games, 4 shutouts, 32 games finished, and 7 saves. He allowed 334 earned runs in 771 1/3 innings pitched for a 3.90 ERA. As a hitter he was well above average for a pitcher, and was used 42 times as a pinch hitter. His lifetime batting average was .262 (83-for-317) with 3 home runs, 19 runs batted in, a .322 on-base percentage, and a slugging average of .356. He only grounded into two double plays during his entire career. Judd finished in his league's top ten five times for wild pitches, leading the National League with 8 in 1947.

Judd was elected to the Canadian Baseball Hall of Fame in 1986. He died in 1995 at the age of 87 in Ingersoll, Ontario.
