= Lou Finney =

American baseball player (1910–1966)

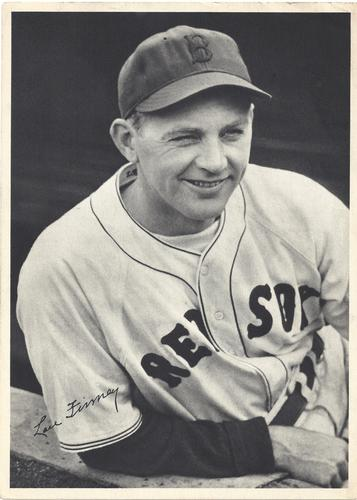
- Outfielder / First baseman
- Born: August 13, 1910; Chambers County, Alabama, U.S.
- Died: April 22, 1966 (aged 55); LaFayette, Alabama, U.S.
- Batted: Left Threw: Right

MLB debut
- September 12, 1931, for the Philadelphia Athletics

Last MLB appearance
- May 8, 1947, for the Philadelphia Phillies

MLB statistics
- Batting average: .287
- Home runs: 31
- Runs batted in: 494
- Stats at Baseball Reference

Teams
- Philadelphia Athletics (1931, 1933–1939); Boston Red Sox (1939–1942, 1944–1945); St. Louis Browns (1945–1946); Philadelphia Phillies (1947)

Career highlights and awards
- All-Star (1940)

Louis Klopsche Finney (August 13, 1910 – April 22, 1966) was an American professional baseball player. He spent fifteen seasons in Major League Baseball (MLB) playing for the Philadelphia Athletics (1931; 1933–1939), Boston Red Sox (1939–1942; 1944–45), St. Louis Browns (1945–46), and Philadelphia Phillies (1947) as an outfielder and first baseman.

Born in Buffalo, in Chambers County, Alabama, the left-handed-batting Finney stood 6 ft 0 in (1.83 m) tall and weighed 180 lb (82 kg). Finney was of Scotch-Irish descent; he was named in memory of Louis Klopsch, a German-American immigrant and founder of The Christian Herald magazine, who died in 1910. An older brother, Hal, was also a Major League player, a catcher for the Pittsburgh Pirates.

Lou Finney's professional baseball career began in the minor leagues in 1930; the next season, he was called up to the pennant-bound Athletics in September, and he batted .375 in nine games—including back-to-back three-hit outings against the Cleveland Indians on September 14–15. He did not appear in the 1931 World Series, which Philadelphia lost to the St. Louis Cardinals, and spent 1932 with the Portland Beavers of the Pacific Coast League, batting .351 with 268 hits.

Finney then split 1933 between the Athletics, getting into 74 games as a back-up outfielder, and the top-level Montreal Royals of the International League. In 1934, he made the Athletics for good, but the Mackmen were beginning a 13-year streak of futility that would see them plummet to the bottom of the American League standings nine times, including 1935, 1936 and 1938. Finney was the club's regular first baseman in both 1936 and 1938, batting .302 with 197 hits in the former year.

Then, on May 8, 1939, his contract was purchased by the first division Red Sox. With Boston, Finney benefited from the batting tips offered by Hall of Famer Hugh Duffy, a veteran Red Sox scout and hitting instructor. He hit .325 in part-time service in 1939, then took over as the Red Sox' regular right fielder in 1940, with Ted Williams shifting to left field. Finney batted .320 with 171 hits, and was named to the 1940 American League All-Star Team.

Finney held onto the Red Sox' right-fielder job in both 1941 and 1942, although his batting average dipped below .290 each season. With World War II raging, he spent the 1943 campaign working his Alabama farm before returning to the Majors for two full seasons (1944–45) and parts of 1946 and 1947.

In 15 Major League seasons, Finney played in 1,270 games and had 4,631 at bats, 643 runs scored, 1,329 hits, 203 doubles, 85 triples, 31 home runs, 494 runs batted in, 39 stolen bases, 329 bases on balls, a .287 batting average, .336 on-base percentage, .388 slugging percentage, 1,795 total bases and 63 sacrifice hits. He led the American League in at bats (653) in 1936 and finished 29th in voting for the 1940 American League MVP Award for leading the AL in at bats per strikeout (41.1)

Finney played and managed in minor league baseball after his final stint in MLB with the 1947 Phillies. He died from coronary thrombosis in LaFayette, Alabama, at the age of 55.
