= Tom Daly (catcher) =

Canadian baseball player (1891–1946)

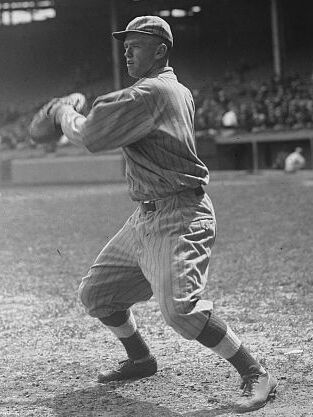
- Daly in 1918
- Catcher
- Born: December 12, 1891; Saint John, New Brunswick, Canada
- Died: November 7, 1946 (aged 54); Medford, Massachusetts, U.S.
- Batted: Right Threw: Right

MLB debut
- September 23, 1913, for the Chicago White Sox

Last MLB appearance
- September 27, 1921, for the Chicago Cubs

MLB statistics
- Batting average: .239
- Home runs: 0
- Runs batted in: 55
- Stats at Baseball Reference

Teams
- Chicago White Sox (1913–1915); Cleveland Indians (1916); Chicago Cubs (1918–1921)

Thomas Daniel Daly (December 12, 1891 – November 7, 1946) was a Canadian Major League Baseball player and coach. He was a catcher for the Chicago White Sox (1913–15), Cleveland Indians (1916) and Chicago Cubs (1918–21).

Born in Saint John, New Brunswick, Daly played eight seasons in the major leagues, appearing in 244 games, and had 540 at-bats, 49 runs, 129 hits, 17 doubles, 3 triples, 55 RBI, 5 stolen bases, 25 walks, a .239 batting average, .274 on-base percentage, a .281 slugging percentage, 152 total bases and 8 sacrifice hits.

After his major league career, he managed the Toronto Maple Leafs of the International League for the early part of the 1932 season. He was a Boston Red Sox coach for 14 seasons (1933–46), the longest consecutive-year coaching tenure in Bosox history.

Daly died in Medford, Massachusetts at the age of 54 from colon cancer.

== See also ==
- List of Major League Baseball players from Canada

Sporting positions
Preceded by Steve O'Neill	Toronto Maple Leafs manager 1932	Succeeded by Lena Blackburne
Preceded by Al Schacht	Boston Red Sox third-base coach 1937–1943	Succeeded by Bill Burwell
