= Johnny Peacock =

American baseball player (1910–1981)

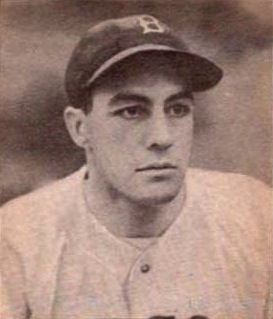
- Catcher
- Born: January 10, 1910; Fremont, North Carolina, U.S.
- Died: October 17, 1981 (aged 71); Wilson, North Carolina, U.S.
- Batted: Left Threw: Right

MLB debut
- September 23, 1937, for the Boston Red Sox

Last MLB appearance
- September 23, 1945, for the Brooklyn Dodgers

MLB statistics
- Batting average: .262
- Home runs: 1
- Runs batted in: 194
- Stats at Baseball Reference

Teams
- Boston Red Sox (1937–1944); Philadelphia Phillies (1944–1945); Brooklyn Dodgers (1945)

John Gaston Peacock (January 10, 1910 – October 17, 1981) was an American part-time catcher in Major League Baseball who played for three teams between 1937 and 1945. Listed at 5 ft 11 in (1.80 m), 165 lb., Peacock batted left-handed and threw right-handed. He was born in Fremont, North Carolina.

A light-hitting catcher, Peacock was good defensively and knew how to handle his pitching staff. He hit one home run in 1734 career at-bats.

Peacock entered the majors in 1937 with the Boston Red Sox, playing for them through the 1944 midseason before joining the Philadelphia Phillies (1944–1945) and Brooklyn Dodgers (1945). In his rookie season, he hit a .313 batting average in nine games played. The next eight years he averaged 76.25 games in each season, with a career-high 92 games in 1939. His most productive years came with Boston, when he hit .303 with a career-high 39 RBI in 1938, and .284 with 20 doubles in 1941.

In a nine-season career, Peacock was a .262 hitter with one home run and 194 RBI in 619 games, including 175 runs, 455 hits, 74 doubles, 16 triples, 14 stolen bases, and a .333 on-base percentage. A disciplinated hitter with a great knowledge of the strike zone, he posted a solid 2.51 walk-to-strikeout ratio (183-to-73).

In 518 appearances behind the plate, Peacock recorded 1863 outs, 220 assists, 37 double plays, and only 36 errors in 2119 total chances for a .983 fielding percentage.

Peacock died in Wilson, North Carolina, at the age of 71.
