= Jack Wilson (pitcher) =

American baseball player (1912–1995)

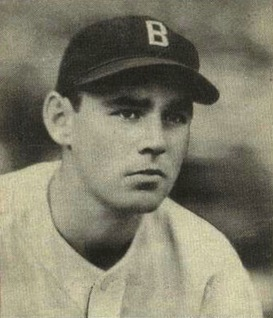
- Pitcher
- Born: April 12, 1912; Portland, Oregon, US
- Died: April 19, 1995 (aged 83); Edmonds, Washington, US
- Batted: Right Threw: Right

MLB debut
- September 9, 1934, for the Philadelphia Athletics

Last MLB appearance
- September 16, 1942, for the Detroit Tigers

MLB statistics
- Win–loss record: 68–72
- Earned run average: 4.59
- Strikeouts: 590
- Stats at Baseball Reference

Teams
- Philadelphia Athletics (1934); Boston Red Sox (1935–1941); Washington Senators (1942); Detroit Tigers (1942)

John Francis "Black Jack" Wilson (April 12, 1912 – April 19, 1995) was an American professional baseball pitcher. He played all or part of nine seasons in Major League Baseball (MLB) for the Boston Red Sox, Philadelphia Athletics, Washington Senators, and Detroit Tigers. He played college baseball at the University of Portland.

Wilson was a good hitting pitcher in his major league career, posting a .199 batting average with 34 runs, 3 home runs and 49 RBI in 281 games pitched.

Wilson served as a player-manager for the Salem Senators in 1947 and 1948.

== Sources ==
- Career statistics from MLB · ESPN · Baseball Reference · Baseball Reference (Minors) · Retrosheet · Baseball Almanac
