= Joe Dobson =

American baseball player (1917–1994)

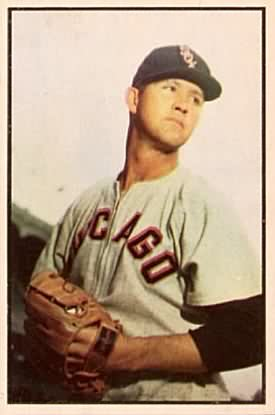
- Pitcher
- Born: January 20, 1917; Durant, Oklahoma, U.S.
- Died: June 23, 1994 (aged 77); Jacksonville, Florida, U.S.
- Batted: Right Threw: Right

MLB debut
- April 26, 1939, for the Cleveland Indians

Last MLB appearance
- April 30, 1954, for the Boston Red Sox

MLB statistics
- Win–loss record: 137–103
- Earned run average: 3.62
- Strikeouts: 992
- Stats at Baseball Reference

Teams
- Cleveland Indians (1939–1940); Boston Red Sox (1941–1943, 1946–1950); Chicago White Sox (1951–1953); Boston Red Sox (1954)

Career highlights and awards
- All-Star (1948); Boston Red Sox Hall of Fame

Joseph Gordon Dobson (January 20, 1917 – June 23, 1994) was an American professional baseball player, a right-handed pitcher who appeared in Major League Baseball for the Cleveland Indians (1939–40), Boston Red Sox (1941–43; 1946–50; 1954) and Chicago White Sox (1951–53). After his playing career, Dobson was the pitching coach for the Red Sox for a season and a general manager in the Red Sox minor league system.

== Early life ==
Dobson was born in Durant, Oklahoma. At the age of nine, he lost his left thumb and forefinger playing with a dynamite cap. Dobson entered professional baseball in 1937, pitching for the Troy Trojans of the Alabama–Florida League, winning 19 games and striking out 200 batters in 270 innings. The next season, he pitched for the New Orleans Pelicans of the Southern Association, finishing with an 11–7 win–loss record and making the case that he was ready for the major leagues.

== MLB career ==
After playing his first two MLB seasons for Cleveland in 1939 and 1940, Dobson was sent to Boston in a six-player trade that included Jim Bagby, Jr. Dobson enjoyed his best years with the Red Sox. Between 1941 and 1950 (excepting 1944–45, when he served in the United States Army during World War II), he won 106 games for the Red Sox. Dobson won a game as a starting pitcher in the 1946 World Series, and he also appeared as a relief pitcher twice during that series. His best MLB season came in 1947, when he finished with an 18–8 win–loss record. In September of that season, Dobson threw a one-hitter. He was an All-Star in 1948.

Dobson pitched for the Chicago White Sox between 1951 and 1953. The White Sox released Dobson in August 1953, and he did not pitch for the rest of the season. He was signed as a free agent by the Red Sox before the 1954 season; the team released him in May of that season after he made two relief appearances.

In a 14-season career, Dobson compiled a 137–103 record with 992 strikeouts, a 3.62 ERA, 112 complete games, 22 shutouts, 18 saves, and 2,170 innings in 414 games pitched (273 as a starter).

== Later life ==
Dobson became the pitching coach for the Red Sox. He later served as general manager of the Winter Haven Red Sox of the Florida State League. He died in 1994 in Jacksonville, Florida, at the age of 77. He is buried at Evergreen Cemetery in Jacksonville. In 2012, he was inducted into the Boston Red Sox Hall of Fame.

Sporting positions
Preceded by Bill McKechnie	Boston Red Sox Pitching Coach; 1954	Succeeded by Dave Ferriss
