= 1946 Boston Red Sox season =

Major League Baseball season

1946 Boston Red Sox
- American League champions
- League: American League
- Ballpark: Fenway Park
- City: Boston, Massachusetts
- Record: 104–50 (.675)
- League place: 1st
- Owners: Tom Yawkey
- President: Tom Yawkey
- General managers: Eddie Collins
- Managers: Joe Cronin
- Radio: WNAC (Jim Britt, Tom Hussey)
- Stats: ESPN.com; Baseball Reference

The 1946 Boston Red Sox season was the 46th season in the franchise's Major League Baseball history. The Red Sox finished first in the American League (AL) with a record of 104 wins and 50 losses, and set a franchise record with a 15-game winning streak. (Note: The 15-game winning streak was matched by the 2026 Red Sox.) This was the team's sixth AL championship, and their first since 1918. In the 1946 World Series, the Red Sox lost to the National League (NL) champion St. Louis Cardinals, whose winning run in the seventh game was scored on Enos Slaughter's famous "Mad Dash".

== Regular season ==
=== Overview ===
The 1946 Red Sox were led by their All-Star left fielder, Ted Williams, who was in his first year back in the majors after serving as a fighter pilot in World War II. 1946 was Ted Williams first of two MVP seasons, and the only time he ever won a pennant. He was among the league leaders in many offensive categories, with a batting average of .342, 38 home runs and 123 runs batted in.

On April 24, the Red Sox were 6–3, 1 game behind the Yankees and tied for second with the defending world series champion Tigers. Then, from April 25 through May 10, they won 15 games in a row, beating the Yankees twice and sweeping the Tigers in a three-game series. Over this stretch Ted Williams had a batting average of .442, with 4 home runs and 17 runs batted in. On May 10 the Red Sox were 21–3 and leading the American League, 5 1/2 games ahead of the Yankees and 8 games ahead of the Tigers. This was their biggest lead in 28 seasons, since winning their last pennant in 1918. The fans took notice as the Red Sox had their highest attendance ever, nearly doubling their previous record. For the first time in Fenway Park history, the Red Sox were averaging over 10,000 fans per game, averaging 18,166 fans per game throughout 1946.

The Red Sox never turned back, winning 12 straight decisions from May 29 through June 11, including their second three-game sweep of the Tigers. On June 11, the Red Sox were 41–9, 10 games ahead of the Yankees. From June 5 through July 21, in 48 games, Ted Williams had a batting average of .399, with 18 home runs and 52 runs batted in. The Red Sox swept the Tigers for the third time that year on July 11–13. On July 14, Williams hit three home runs in a game. The Red Sox swept their rivals, the Yankees, in a double-header at Yankee Stadium on September 2, expanding their lead to 15 1/2 games ahead of the Yankees and 18 games ahead of the Tigers. The Red Sox clinched the American League pennant on September 13, off of an inside-the-park home run hit by Ted Williams, the only one of his major-league career. It was their first pennant since 1918, when they won the World Series. The Red Sox ended the season 12 games ahead of the Tigers and 17 games ahead of the Yankees.

While the Red Sox had clinched the American League pennant in September, the St. Louis Cardinals and Brooklyn Dodgers both finished atop the National League with a record of 96–58, necessitating a three-game playoff.

With the start of the 1946 World Series delayed, The Red Sox played a three-game series against an American League all-star team beginning October 1 at Fenway Park. The Red Sox won two of three, but Williams exacerbated his injury, which plagued him in the ensuing World Series against St. Louis.

=== Season Log ===
Boston Win	Boston Loss	Tie

1946 Boston Red Sox Season Log: 104─50─2
April: 11─3

#	Date	Opponent	Score	Win	Loss	Save	Record	Source
1	April 16	@ Washington	6─3	Tex Hughson (1─0)	Roger Wolff (0─1)	─	1─0	
2	April 17	@ Washington	13─6	Earl Johnson (1─0)	Walt Masterson (0─1)	─	2─0	
3	April 18	@ Washington	3─1	Mickey Harris (1─0)	Ray Scarborough (0─1)	─	3─0	
4	April 20	Vs. Philadelphia	1─2	Tex Hughson (2─0)	Dick Fowler (0─1)	─	4─0	
5	April 21 (1)	Vs. Philadelphia	11─12	Joe Dobson (1─0)	Joe Berry (0─1)	─	5─0	
6	April 21 (2)	Vs. Philadelphia	3─0	Bobo Newsom (2─0)	Jim Bagby Jr. (0─1)	─	5─1	
7	April 22	Vs. Philadelphia	4─5	Mickey Harris (2─0)	Sid Hudson (0─1)	─	6─1	
8	April 23	Vs. Philadelphia	8─2	Roger Wolff (1─2)	Mike Ryba (1─2)	─	6─2	
9	April 24	Vs. New York	12─5	Randy Gumpert (1─1)	Tex Hughson (2─1)	Jake Wade (1)	6─3	
10	April 25	Vs. New York	5─12	Joe Dobson (2─0)	Steve Roser (1─1)	─	7─3	
11	April 26	@ Philadelphia	7─0	Dave Ferriss (1─0)	Dick Fowler (0─2)	─	8─3	
12	April 28 (1)	@ Philadelphia	2─1	Tex Hughson (3─1)	Lou Knerr (0─2)	─	9─3	
13	April 28 (2)	@ Philadelphia	5─1	Mickey Harris (3─0)	Bobo Newsom (2─1)	─	10─3	
14	April 30	Vs. Detroit	0─4	Joe Dobson (3─0)	Hal Newhouser (3─1)	─	11─3	

May: 21─6

#	Date	Opponent	Score	Win	Loss	Save	Record	Source
15	May 1	Vs. Detroit	1─13	Dave Ferriss (2─0)	Al Benton (1─2)	─	12─3	
16	May 2	Vs. Detroit	4─5	Clem Dreisewerd (1─0)	Tommy Bridges (0─1)	─	13─3	
17	May 3	Vs. Cleveland	4─9	Mickey Harris (4─0)	Red Embree (2─1)	─	14─3	
18	May 4	Vs. Cleveland	2─6	Jim Bagby Jr. (1─1)	Bob Feller (2─3)	─	15─3	
19	May 6 (1)	Vs. St. Louis	5─7	Dave Ferriss (3─0)	Denny Galehouse (0─4)	─	16─3	
20	May 6 (2)	Vs. St. Louis	4─5	Joe Dobson (4─0)	Stan Ferens (0─2)	─	17─3	
21	May 7	Vs. St. Louis	6─10	Clem Dreisewerd (2─0)	Tex Shirley (1─2)	─	18─3	
22	May 8	Vs. Chicago	10─14	Mickey Harris (5─0)	Joe Haynes (1─1)	Dave Ferriss (1)	19─3	
23	May 9	Vs. Chicago	5─7	Jim Bagby Jr. (2─1)	Eddie Lopat (2─2)	Mace Brown (1)	20─3	
24	May 10	@ New York	5─4	Earl Johnson (2─0)	Joe Page (0─1)	─	21─3	
25	May 11	@ New York	0─2	Tiny Bonham (2─0)	Tex Hughson (3─2)	─	21─4	
26	May 12	@ New York	3─1	Mickey Harris (6─0)	Spud Chandler (5─1)	─	22─4	
27	May 14	@ Chicago	3─0	Dave Ferriss (4─0)	Joe Haynes (1─2)	─	23─4	
28	May 15	@ Chicago	2─3	Johnny Rigney (1─1)	Tex Hughson (3─3)	Eddie Smith (1)	23─5	
29	May 16	@ St Louis	0─3	Jack Kramer (2─0)	Joe Dobson (4─1)	─	23─6	
30	May 18	@ St Louis	18─8	Mickey Harris (7─0)	Tex Shirley (2─3)	─	24─6	
31	May 19 (1)	@ Detroit	4─0	Dave Ferriss (5─0)	Dizzy Trout (3─2)	─	25─6	
32	May 19 (2)	@ Detroit	1─3	Hal Newhouser (6─1)	Tex Hughson (3─4)	─	25─7	
33	May 21	@ Detroit	6─4	Earl Johnson (3─0)	Al Benton (1─4)	─	26─7	
34	May 22	@ Cleveland	7─4	Dave Ferriss (6─0)	Pete Center (0─1)	Tex Hughson (1)	27─7	
35	May 23	@ Cleveland	2─3	Red Embree (4─2)	Randy Heflin (0─1)	─	27─8	
36	May 25	Vs. New York	4─7	Dave Ferriss (7─0)	Spud Chandler (6─2)	Earl Johnson (1)	28─8	
37	May 26 (1)	Vs. New York	0─1	Tex Hughson (4─4)	Bill Bevens (2─4)	─	29─8	
38	May 26 (2)	Vs. New York	4─1	Joe Page (2─1)	Mickey Harris (7─1)	─	29─9	
39	May 29	Vs. Philadelphia	0─2	Dave Ferriss (8─0)	Phil Marchildon (0─4)	─	30─9	
40	May 30 (1)	Vs. Washington	5─6	Joe Dobson (5─1)	Sid Hudson (1─3)	─	31─9	
41	May 30 (2)	Vs. Washington	2─7	Mickey Harris (8─1)	Ray Scarborough (3─2)	─	32─9	

June: 18─10─2

#	Date	Opponent	Score	Win	Loss	Save	Record	Source
42	June 3 (1)	Vs. Chicago	1─6	Dave Ferriss (9─0)	Thornton Lee (2─3)	─	33─9	
43	June 3 (2)	Vs. Chicago	2─5	Joe Dobson (6─1)	Eddie Lopat (3─4)	─	34─9	
44	June 4	Vs. St. Louis	4─9	Earl Johnson (4─0)	Tex Shirley (3─5)	─	35─9	
45	June 5	Vs. St. Louis	8─8	─	─	─	35─9─1	
46	June 6	Vs. St. Louis	4─5	Mace Brown (1─0)	Ox Miller (1─2)	Dave Ferriss (2)	36─9─1	
47	June 8	Vs. Detroit	4─15	Joe Dobson (7─1)	Hal Newhouser (9─2)	Bob Klinger (1)	37─9─1	
48	June 9 (1)	Vs. Detroit	1─7	Mickey Harris (9─1)	Dizzy Trout (5─4)	─	38─9─1	
49	June 9 (2)	Vs. Detroit	6─11	Dave Ferriss (10─0)	Fred Hutchinson (2─3)	─	39─9─1	
50	June 10	Vs. Cleveland	3─6	Bill Butland (1─0)	Steve Gromek (3─6)	Earl Johnson (2)	40─9─1	
51	June 11	Vs. Cleveland	5─10	Bob Klinger (1─0)	Red Embree (5─4)	─	41─9─1	
52	June 12	Vs. Cleveland	7─2	Bob Feller (10─4)	Jim Bagby Jr. (2─2)	─	41─10─1	
53	June 14	@ Chicago	5─9	Earl Caldwell (3─2)	Earl Johnson (4─1)	─	41─11─1	
54	June 15	@ Chicago	6─7	Joe Haynes (2─5)	Dave Ferriss (10─1)	Bill Dietrich (1)	41─12─1	
55	June 16 (1)	@ Chicago	6─1	Tex Hughson (5─4)	Thornton Lee (2─4)	─	42─12─1	
56	June 16 (2)	@ Chicago	4─7	Earl Caldwell (4─2)	Jim Bagby Jr. (2─3)	─	42─13─1	
57	June 17	@ St. Louis	1─7	Jack Kramer (7─1)	Mickey Harris (9─2)	─	42─14─1	
58	June 18	@ St. Louis	0─1	Bob Muncrief (1─2)	Dave Ferriss (10─2)	─	42─15─1	
59	June 20	@ St. Louis	0─2	Sam Zoldak (6─6)	Joe Dobson (7─2)	─	42─16─1	
60	June 21	@ Cleveland	1─0	Tex Hughson (6─4)	Bob Feller (11─5)	─	43─16─1	
61	June 22	@ Cleveland	3─4	Joe Krakauskas (2─3)	Dave Ferriss (10─3)	─	43─17─1	
62	June 23 (1)	@ Cleveland	5─1	Mickey Harris (10─2)	Steve Gromek (3─7)	─	44─17─1	
63	June 23 (2)	@ Cleveland	6─0	Bill Zuber (1─1)	Don Black (1─2)	─	45─17─1	
64	June 24	@ Detroit	5─5	─	─	─	45─17─2	
65	June 25	@ Detroit	1─0	Tex Hughson (7─4)	Fred Hutchinson (2─5)	─	46─17─2	
66	June 26 (1)	@ Detroit Tigers	2─16	Hal Newhouser (13─3)	Joe Dobson (7─3)	─	46─18─2	
67	June 26 (2)	@ Detroit Tigers	9─3	Dave Ferriss (11─3)	Virgil Trucks (11─6)	─	47─18─2	
68	June 28	Vs. Washington	1─12	Mickey Harris (11─2)	Roger Wolff (4─7)	─	48─18─2	
69	June 29	Vs. Washington	8─12	Tex Hughson (8─4)	Al LaMacchia (0─1)	Bob Klinger (2)	49─18─2	
70	June 30 (1)	Vs. Washington	8─15	Dave Ferriss (12─3)	Bobo Newsome (4─7)	─	50─18─2	
71	June 30 (2)	Vs. Washington	9─2	Mickey Haefner (5─5)	Earl Johnson (4─2)	─	50─19─2	

July: 20─10

#	Date	Opponent	Score	Win	Loss	Save	Record	Source
72	July 2	@ New York	1─2	Spud Chandler (12─3)	Mickey Harris (11─3)	─	50─20─2	
73	July 3	@ New York	2─3	Joe Page (4─3)	Tex Hughson (8─5)	─	50─21─2	
74	July 4 (1)	@ Philadelphia	2─3	Phil Marchildon (4─7)	Dave Ferriss (12─4)	─	50─22─2	
75	July 4 (2)	@ Philadelphia	9─8	Clem Dreisewerd (3─0)	Lou Knerr (2─8)	Mike Ryba (1)	51─22─2	
76	July 5	@ Philadelphia	5─2	Joe Dobson (8─3)	Dick Fowler (5─7)	Tex Hughson (2)	52─22─2	
77	July 6	@ Washington	0─4	Mickey Haefner (6─5)	Mickey Harris (11─4)	─	52─23─2	
78	July 7 (1)	@ Washington	11─1	Tex Hughson (9─5)	Sid Hudson (6─6)	─	53─23─2	
79	July 7 (2)	@ Washington	9─4	Clem Dreisewerd (4─0)	Walt Masterson (3─5)	Bob Klinger (3)	54─23─2	
80	July 11	Vs. Detroit	2─3	Tex Hughson (10─5)	Fred Hutchinson (4─6)	─	55─23─2	
81	July 12	Vs. Detroit	2─4	Dave Ferriss (13─4)	Virgil Trucks (10─7)	─	56─23─2	
82	July 13	Vs. Detroit	4─5	Mickey Harris (12─4)	Dizzy Trout (8─7)	Bob Klinger (4)	57─23─2	
83	July 14 (1)	Vs. Cleveland	10─11	Jim Bagby Jr. (3─3)	Joe Berry (1─2)	Tex Hughson (3)	58─23─2	
84	July 14 (2)	Vs. Cleveland	4─6	Bill Zuber (2─1)	Red Embree (6─7)	Dave Ferriss (3)	59─23─2	
85	July 16	Vs. Cleveland	6─3	Bob Feller (16─6)	Tex Hughson (10─6)	─	59─24─2	
86	July 17 (1)	Vs. Chicago	1─3	Joe Dobson (9─3)	Eddie Lopat (5─7)	─	60─24─2	
87	July 17 (2)	Vs. Chicago	1─6	Dave Ferriss (14─4)	Orval Grove (4─8)	─	61─24─2	
88	July 18	Vs. Chicago	2─3	Mickey Harris (13─4)	Johnny Rigney (1─3)	Bob Klinger (5)	62─24─2	
89	July 19	Vs. Chicago	2─9	Bill Zuber (3─1)	Joe Haynes (3─7)	─	63─24─2	
90	July 20	Vs. St. Louis	5─4	Jack Kramer (10─4)	Tex Hughson (10─7)	Tom Ferrick	63─25─2	
91	July 21 (1)	Vs. St. Louis	0─5	Dave Ferriss (15─4)	Tex Shirley (5─10)	─	64─25─2	
92	July 21 (2)	Vs. St. Louis	4─7	Joe Dobson (10─3)	Cliff Fannin (2─1)	Bob Klinger (6)	65─25─2	
93	July 23	@ Chicago	1─7	Johnny Rigney (2─3)	Bill Zuber (3─2)	─	65─26─2	
94	July 24	@ Chicago	4─1	Tex Hughson (11─7)	Orval Grove (4─9)	─	66─26─2	
95	July 25	@ Chicago	1─3	Eddie Smith (6─7)	Joe Dobson (10─4)	Earl Caldwell (4)	66─27─2	
96	July 26	@ St. Louis	8─5	Dave Ferriss (16─4)	Nels Potter (6─6)	─	67─27─2	
97	July 27	@ St. Louis	13─6	Charlie Wagner (1─0)	Bob Muncrief (2─6)	Earl Johnson (3)	68─27─2	
98	July 28 (1)	@ St. Louis	2─3	Denny Galehouse (5─7)	Tex Hughson (11─8)	─	68─28─2	
99	July 28 (2)	@ St. Louis	11─4	Jim Bagby Jr. (4─3)	Jack Kramer (10─6)	─	69─28─2	
100	July 30	@ Cleveland	4─0	Dave Ferriss (17─4)	Steve Gromek (4─10)	─	70─28─2	
101	July 31	@ Cleveland	1─4	Bob Feller (20─6)	Mickey Harris (13─5)	─	70─29─2	

August: 21─11

#	Date	Opponent	Score	Win	Loss	Save	Record	Source
102	August 1	@ Cleveland	1─2	Mel Harder (3─2)	Joe Dobson (10─5)	Joe Berry (1)	70─30─2	
103	August 2	@ Detroit	1─7	Dizzy Trout (9─10)	Tex Hughson (11─9)	─	70─31─2	
104	August 3	@ Detroit	5─3	Dave Ferriss (18─4)	Fred Hutchinson (7─8)	─	71─31─2	
105	August 4	@ Detroit	9─4	Mickey Harris (14─5)	Hal Newhouser (20─4)	─	72─31─2	
106	August 6	Vs. Philadelphia	0─5	Tex Hughson (12─9)	Dick Fowler (8─11)	─	73─31─2	
107	August 8 (1)	Vs. Philadelphia	3─4	Joe Dobson (11─5)	Phil Marchildon (7─12)	─	74─31─2	
108	August 8 (2)	Vs. Philadelphia	6─10	Bob Klinger (2─0)	Bob Savage (1─10)	─	75─31─2	
109	August 9	@ New York	4─3	Dave Ferriss (19─4)	Bill Bevens (12─8)	─	76─31─2	
110	August 10	@ New York	5─7	Johnny Murphy (3─2)	Clem Dreisewerd (4─1)	─	76─32─2	
111	August 11 (1)	@ New York	7─5	Mace Brown (2─0)	Spud Chandler (15─6)	Bob Klinger (7)	77─32─2	
112	August 11 (2)	@ New York	1─9	Joe Page (6─5)	Jim Bagby Jr. (4─4)	─	77─33─2	
113	August 13	@ Philadelphia	7─5	Dave Ferriss (20─4)	Bob Savage (1─11)	─	78─33─2	
114	August 14	@ Philadelphia	3─1	Tex Hughson (13─9)	Dick Fowler (8─13)	─	79─33─2	
115	August 15	@ Philadelphia Athletics	3─5	Lou Knerr (3─13)	Joe Dobson (11─6)	─	79─34─2	
116	August 16	Vs. New York	1─4	Mickey Harris (15─5)	Spud Chandler (15─7)	─	80─34─2	
117	August 17	Vs. New York	4─7	Dave Ferriss (21─4)	Tiny Bonham (3─5)	─	81─34─2	
118	August 18 (1)	Vs. New York	5─0	Bill Bevens (14─8)	Tex Hughson (13─10)	─	81─35─2	
119	August 18 (2)	Vs. New York	3─4	Bob Klinger (3─0)	Joe Page (6─6)	─	82─35─2	
120	August 20 (1)	Vs. St. Louis	1─5	Jim Bagby Jr. (5─4)	Tex Shirley (6─11)	─	83─35─2	
121	August 20 (2)	Vs. St. Louis	5─4	Ellis Kinder (1─2)	Mickey Harris (15─6)	Tom Ferrick (4)	83─36─2	
122	August 21	Vs. St. Louis	9─12	Dave Ferriss (22─4)	Bob Muncrief (3─10)	Bob Klinger (8)	84─36─2	
123	August 22	Vs. Chicago	4─3	Earl Caldwell (11─3)	Mace Brown (2─1)	─	84─37─2	
124	August 24 (1)	Vs. Chicago	5─6	Mace Brown (3─1)	Earl Caldwell (11─4)	─	85─37─2	
125	August 24 (2)	Vs. Chicago	3─1	Frank Papish (3─4)	Jim Bagby Jr. (5─5)	─	85─38─2	
126	August 25 (1)	Vs. Cleveland	1─2	Dave Ferriss (23─4)	Red Embree (8─10)	─	86─38─2	
127	August 25 (2)	Vs. Cleveland	6─13	Earl Johnson (5─2)	Allie Reynolds (10─12)	─	87─38─2	
128	August 26	Vs. Cleveland	1─5	Tex Hughson (14─10)	Bob Lemon (2─5)	─	88─38─2	
129	August 28	Vs. Detroit	7─2	Fred Hutchinson (9─11)	Mickey Harris (15─7)	Johnny Gorsica (1)	88─39─2	
130	August 29	Vs. Detroit	9─8	Dizzy Trout (12─12)	Bob Klinger (3─1)	─	88─40─2	
131	August 30 (1)	Vs. Philadelphia	0─6	Tex Hughson (15─10)	Lou Knerr (3─14)	─	89─40─2	
132	August 30 (2)	Vs. Philadelphia	2─6	Jim Bagby Jr. (6─5)	Phil Marchildon (11─13)	─	90─40─2	
133	August 31	Vs. Philadelphia	2─4	Bill Zuber (4─2)	Dick Fowler (9─14)	Bob Klinger (9)	91─40─2	

September: 13─10

#	Date	Opponent	Score	Win	Loss	Save	Record	Source
134	September 1	Vs. Philadelphia	3─4	Tex Hughson (16─10)	Bob Savage (2─13)	─	92─40─2	
135	September 2 (1)	@ New York	5─2	Dave Ferriss (24─4)	Tiny Bonham (5─6)	─	93─40─2	
136	September 2 (2)	@ New York	3─1	Mickey Harris (16─7)	Joe Page (7─7)	─	94─40─2	
137	September 4	@ Washington	4─2	Tex Hughson (17─10)	Sid Hudson (17─11)	─	95─40─2	
138	September 5	@ Washington	1─0	Jim Bagby Jr. (7─5)	Ray Scarborough (6─10)	─	96─40─2	
139	September 6	@ Washington	2─3	Bobo Newsom (14─10)	Earl Johnson (5─3)	─	96─41─2	
140	September 7	@ Philadelphia	2─4	Jesse Flores (8─5)	Dave Ferriss (24─5)	─	96─42─2	
141	September 8	@ Philadelphia	3─5	Phil Marchildon (13─13)	Tex Hughson (17─11)	─	96─43─2	
142	September 10	@ Detroit	1─9	Fred Hutchinson (11─11)	Mickey Harris (16─8)	─	96─44─2	
143	September 11	@ Detroit	3─7	Dizzy Trout (15─12)	Dave Ferriss (24─6)	─	96─45─2	
144	September 12	@ Cleveland	1─4	Bob Feller (24─12)	Jim Bagby Jr. (7─6)	─	96─46─2	
145	September 13	@ Cleveland	1─0	Tex Hughson (18─11)	Red Embree (8─12)	─	97─46─2	
146	September 15 (1)	@ Chicago	4─1	Dave Ferriss (25─6)	Eddie Smith (8─11)	─	98─46─2	
147	September 15 (2)	@ Chicago	0─6	Johnny Rigney (4─5)	Earl Johnson (5─4)	─	98─47─2	
148	September 18	@ St. Louis	6─2	Joe Dobson (12─6)	Jack Kramer (13─9)	─	99─47─2	
149	September 19	@ St. Louis	5─6	Cliff Fannin (5─2)	Bob Klinger (3─2)	─	99─48─2	
150	September 21	@ Washington	7─5	Bill Zuber (5─2)	Mickey Haefner (13─11)	─	100─48─2	
151	September 22	@ Washington	4─1	Tex Hughson (19─11)	Early Wynn (7─5)	─	101─48─2	
152	September 24	Vs. New York	4─5	Mickey Harris (17─8)	Al Lyons (0─1)	─	102─48─2	
153	September 25	Vs. New York	2─5	Joe Dobson (13─6)	Cuddles Marshall (3─4)	─	103─48─2	
154	September 27	Vs. Washington	4─5	Tex Hughson (20─11)	Bobo Newsom (14─13)	─	104─48─2	
155	September 28	Vs. Washington	4─3	Early Wynn (8─5)	Mickey Harris (17─9)	─	104─49─2	
156	September 29	Vs. Washington	7─0	Ray Scarborough (7─11)	Joe Dobson (13─7)	─	104─50─2	

=== Season standings ===
American League
Team	W	L	Pct.	GB	Home	Road
Boston Red Sox	104	50	.675	—	61‍–‍16	43‍–‍34
Detroit Tigers	92	62	.597	12	48‍–‍30	44‍–‍32
New York Yankees	87	67	.565	17	47‍–‍30	40‍–‍37
Washington Senators	76	78	.494	28	38‍–‍38	38‍–‍40
Chicago White Sox	74	80	.481	30	40‍–‍38	34‍–‍42
Cleveland Indians	68	86	.442	36	36‍–‍41	32‍–‍45
St. Louis Browns	66	88	.429	38	35‍–‍41	31‍–‍47
Philadelphia Athletics	49	105	.318	55	31‍–‍46	18‍–‍59

=== Record vs. opponents ===
1946 American League record Sources:
Team	BOS	CWS	CLE	DET	NYY	PHA	SLB	WSH
Boston	—	13–9	15–7	15–7–1	14–8	17–5	14–8–1	16–6
Chicago	9–13	—	13–9–1	10–12	8–14	12–10	12–10	10–12
Cleveland	7–15	9–13–1	—	5–17	10–12	15–7	15–7–1	7–15
Detroit	7–15–1	12–10	17–5	—	13–9	17–5	14–8	12–10
New York	8–14	14–8	12–10	9–13	—	16–6	14–8	14–8
Philadelphia	5–17	10–12	7–15	5–17	6–16	—	10–12	6–16–1
St. Louis	8–14–1	10–12	7–15–1	8–14	8–14	12–10	—	13–9
Washington	6–16	12–10	15–7	10–12	8–14	16–6–1	9–13	—

=== Opening Day lineup ===
7	Dom DiMaggio	CF
6	Johnny Pesky	SS
9	Ted Williams	LF
1	Bobby Doerr	2B
3	Rudy York	1B
2	Catfish Metkovich	RF
35	Ernie Andres	3B
8	Hal Wagner	C
21	Tex Hughson	P

=== Notable transactions ===
- July 1946: Don Lang and Bill Howerton were traded by the Red Sox to the St. Louis Cardinals for Jim Gleeson.
- July 23, 1946: Wally Moses was purchased by the Red Sox from the Chicago White Sox.

=== Roster ===
1946 Boston Red Sox
Roster
Pitchers: 17 Jim Bagby; 25 Mace Brown; 28 Bill Butland; 34 Mel Deutsch; 15 Joe Dobson; 23 Clem Dreisewerd; 33 Dave Ferriss; 19 Mickey Harris; 26 Randy Heflin; 21 Tex Hughson; 12 Earl Johnson; 37 Bob Klinger; 20 Mike Ryba; 27 Charlie Wagner; 10 Jim Wilson; 26 Bill Zuber	Catchers: 38 Eddie McGah; 16 Roy Partee; 2 Frankie Pytlak; 8 Hal Wagner; Infielders: 35 Ernie Andres; 46 Paul Campbell; 14 Tom Carey; 1 Bobby Doerr; 10 Don Gutteridge; 36 Pinky Higgins; 39 Eddie Pellagrini; 6 Johnny Pesky; 5 Rip Russell; 44 Ben Steiner; 3 Rudy York	Outfielders: 11 Leon Culberson; 7 Dom DiMaggio; 42 Andy Gilbert; 29 Johnny Lazor; 18 Tom McBride; 2 Catfish Metkovich; 24 Wally Moses; 9 Ted Williams	Manager: 4 Joe Cronin; Coaches: 30 Del Baker (Third base); 14 Tom Carey; 32 Tom Daly; 31 Paul Schreiber; 22 Larry Woodall (First base)

== Player stats ==
= Indicates team leader

= Indicates league leader

=== Batting ===
==== Starters by position ====
Note: GP=Games played; AB=At bats; R=Runs; H=Hits; 2B=Doubles; 3B=Triples; HR=Home runs; RBI=Runs batted in; BB=Walks; AVG=Batting average; OBP=On base percentage; SLG=Slugging percentage

Pos	Player	GP	AB	R	H	2B	3B	HR	RBI	BB	AVG	OBP	SLG	Ref
C	Hal Wagner	117	370	39	85	12	2	6	51	69	.230	.354	.322	
1B	Rudy York	154	579	78	160	30	6	17	119	86	.276	.371	.437	
2B	Bobby Doerr	151	583	95	158	35	9	18	117	66	.271	.346	.455	
SS	Johnny Pesky	153	621	115	208	43	4	2	55	65	.335	.401	.427	
3B	Rip Russell	80	274	22	57	10	1	6	35	13	.208	.247	.318	
OF	Dom DiMaggio	142	534	85	169	24	7	7	73	66	.316	.393	.427	
OF	Ted Williams	150	514	142	176	37	8	38	123	156	.342	.497	.667	
OF	George Metkovich	86	281	42	69	15	2	4	25	36	.246	.333	.356	

==== Position players ====
Note: GP=Games played; AB=At bats; R=Runs; H=Hits; 2B=Doubles; 3B=Triples; HR=Home runs; RBI=Runs batted in; BB=Walks; AVG=Batting average; OBP=On base percentage; SLG=Slugging percentage

Player	GP	AB	R	H	2B	3B	HR	RBI	BB	AVG	OBP	SLG	Ref
Pinky Higgins	64	200	18	55	11	1	2	28	24	.275	.356	.370	
Leon Culberson	59	179	34	56	10	1	3	18	16	.313	.369	.430	
Wally Moses	48	175	23	36	11	3	2	17	14	.206	.268	.337	
Tom McBride	62	153	21	46	5	2	0	18	9	.301	.340	.359	
Roy Partee	40	111	13	35	5	2	0	9	13	.315	.387	.396	
Eddie Pellagrini	22	71	7	15	3	1	2	4	3	.211	.253	.366	
Don Gutteridge	22	47	8	11	3	0	1	6	2	.234	.265	.362	
Ernie Andres	15	41	0	4	2	0	0	1	3	.098	.159	.146	
Eddie McGah	15	37	2	8	1	1	0	1	7	.216	.341	.297	
Johnny Lazor	23	29	1	4	0	0	1	4	2	.138	.194	.241	
Paul Campbell	28	26	3	3	1	0	0	0	2	.115	.179	.154	
Frankie Pytlak	4	14	1	2	0	0	0	1	0	.143	.143	.143	
Tom Carey	3	5	0	1	0	0	0	0	0	.200	.200	.200	
Ben Steiner	3	4	1	1	0	0	0	0	0	.250	.250	.250	
Andy Gilbert	2	1	1	0	0	0	0	0	0	.000	.000	.000	

==== Pitchers ====
Note: GP=Games played; AB=At bats; R=Runs; H=Hits; 2B=Doubles; 3B=Triples; HR=Home runs; RBI=Runs batted in; BB=Walks; AVG=Batting average; OBP=On base percentage; SLG=Slugging percentage

Player	GP	AB	R	H	2B	3B	HR	RBI	BB	AVG	OBP	SLG	Ref
Dave Ferriss	45	115	12	24	6	0	0	7	5	.209	.242	.261	
Tex Hughson	39	91	5	12	1	0	0	4	8	.132	.202	.143	
Mickey Harris	34	78	11	18	1	0	0	5	10	.231	.318	.244	
Joe Dobson	32	50	5	5	0	0	0	2	4	.100	.167	.100	
Jim Bagby Jr.	21	42	2	5	1	0	0	2	2	.119	.159	.143	
Earl Johnson	29	22	4	5	2	0	0	4	4	.227	.346	.318	
Bill Zuber	15	18	1	2	0	0	0	2	1	.111	.158	.111	
Bob Klinger	28	16	1	5	0	0	0	2	0	.313	.313	.313	
Charlie Wagner	8	11	0	1	0	0	0	0	0	.091	.091	.091	
Clem Dreiseward	20	10	0	0	0	0	0	0	1	.000	.091	.000	
Mace Brown	18	5	0	0	0	0	0	0	0	.000	.000	.000	
Bill Butland	5	4	0	1	0	0	0	2	0	.250	.250	.250	
Randy Heflin	5	3	0	2	0	0	0	1	0	.667	.667	.667	
Mike Ryba	9	2	0	2	0	0	0	0	0	1.000	1.000	1.000	
Mel Deutsch	3	2	0	0	0	0	0	0	0	.000	.000	.000	
Totals	156	5318	792	1441	268	50	109	737	687	.271	.356	.402	

=== Pitching ===
Note: G=Games Played; GS=Games Started; IP=Innings Pitched; H=Hits; BB=Walks; R=Runs; ER=Earned Runs; SO=Strikeouts; W=Wins; L=Losses; SV=Saves; ERA=Earned Run Average

Player	G	GS	IP	H	BB	R	ER	SO	W	L	SV	ERA	Ref
Tex Hughson	39	35	278	252	51	89	85	172	20	11	3	2.75	
Dave Ferriss	40	35	274	274	71	109	99	106	25	6	3	3.25	
Mickey Harris	34	30	222 2/3	236	77	105	92	131	17	9	0	3.72	
Joe Dobson	32	24	166 2/3	148	68	72	60	90	13	7	0	3.24	
Jim Bagby Jr.	21	11	106 2/3	117	49	55	44	16	7	6	0	3.71	
Earl Johnson	29	5	80	78	39	39	33	41	5	4	3	3.71	
Bob Klinger	28	1	57	49	25	16	15	16	3	2	9	2.37	
Bill Zuber	15	7	56 2/3	37	39	20	16	29	5	1	0	2.54	
Clem Dreisewerd	20	1	47 1/3	50	15	22	22	19	4	1	0	4.18	
Charlie Wagner	8	4	30 2/3	32	19	21	21	13	1	0	0	6.16	
Mace Brown	18	0	26 1/3	26	16	7	6	10	3	1	1	2.05	
Bill Butland	5	2	16 1/3	23	13	20	20	11	1	0	0	11.02	
Randy Heflin	5	1	14 2/3	16	12	5	4	6	0	1	0	2.45	
Mike Ryba	9	0	12 2/3	12	5	7	7	5	0	1	1	4.97	
Mel Deutsch	3	0	6 1/3	7	3	5	4	2	0	0	0	5.68	
Jim Wilson	1	0	0 2/3	2	0	2	2	0	0	0	0	27.00	
Totals	156	156	1396 2/3	1359	501	594	525	667	104	50	20	3.38	

== Achievements, Awards, and Accomplishments ==
=== Team ===
The Red Sox led MLB in:

- Runs (792).
- Hits (1441).
- Doubles (268).
- Runs batted in (737).
- Total bases (2136).
- Batting average on balls in play (.293).

The Red Sox led the American League in:

- Batting average (.271).
- On-base percentage (.356).
- Slugging percentage (.402).
- On-base plus slugging (.758).
- Base on balls (687).
- Plate appearances (6126).
- Saves (20).

=== Player ===
==== Ted Williams ====
- American League MVP award winner.
- On June 9, Williams hit his famous 502-foot home run, the longest ever hit at Fenway Park.
- On July 14, Williams became the first Red Sox player to hit three home runs in one game at Fenway Park.
- On July 21, Williams Hit for the cycle against the St. Louis Browns.
- Williams led MLB in:
  - Runs scored (142).
  - Base on balls (156).
  - On-base percentage (.497).
  - Slugging percentage (.667).
  - On-base plus slugging (1.164).
- Williams led the American League in total bases (343).

==== Dave Ferriss ====
- Led the American League in winning percentage (.806).

==== Bob Klinger ====
- Led MLB in saves (9).

== 1946 World Series ==
NL St. Louis Cardinals (4) vs. AL Boston Red Sox (3)

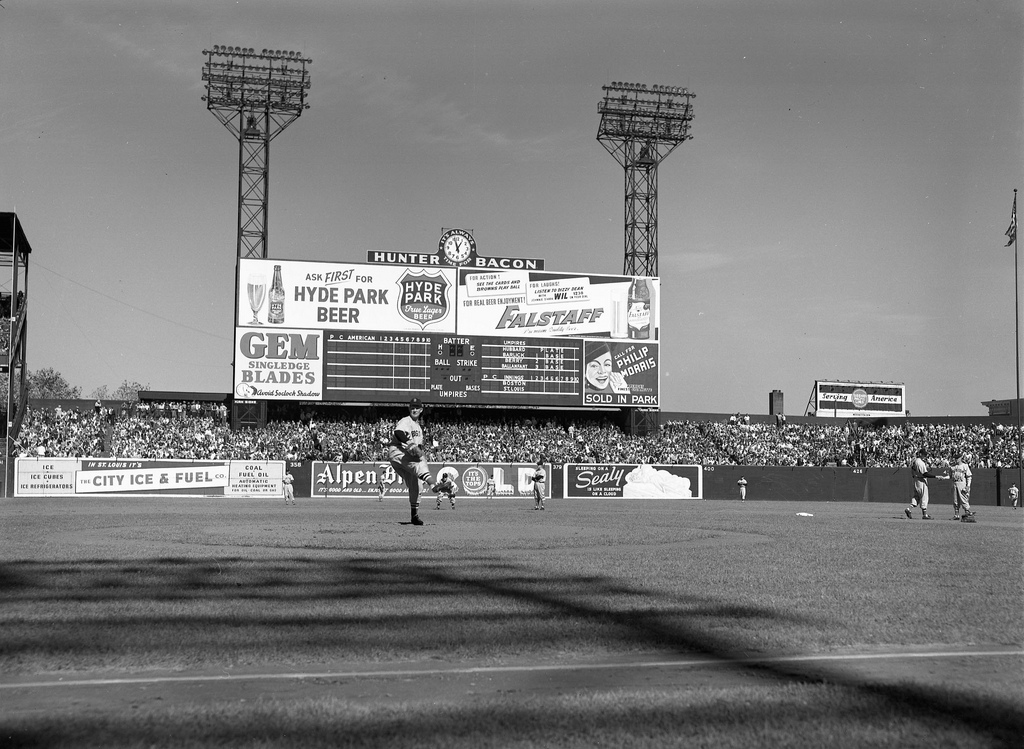
Sportsman's Park during the 1946 World Series

Game	Score	Date	Location	Attendance
1	Boston 3, St. Louis 2 (10)	October 6	St. Louis	36,218
2	St. Louis 3, Boston 0	October 7	St. Louis	35,815
3	Boston 4, St. Louis 0	October 9	Boston	34,500
4	St. Louis 12, Boston 3	October 10	Boston	35,645
5	Boston 6, St. Louis 3	October 11	Boston	35,982
6	St. Louis 4, Boston 1	October 13	St. Louis	35,768
7	St. Louis 4, Boston 3	October 15	St. Louis	36,143

== Farm system ==
Level	Team	League	Manager
AAA	Louisville Colonels	American Association	Fred Walters and Nemo Leibold
AA	New Orleans Pelicans	Southern Association	Johnny Peacock
A	Scranton Red Sox	Eastern League	Elmer Yoter
B	Lynn Red Sox	New England League	Lawrence "Pip" Kennedy
B	Roanoke Red Sox	Piedmont League	Eddie Popowski
C	Oneonta Red Sox	Canadian–American League	Red Marion
C	Durham Bulls	Carolina League	Floyd "Pat" Patterson
D	Geneva Red Birds	Alabama State League	Charles Holly
D	Salem Friends/Lenoir Red Sox	Blue Ridge League	Noel Casbier
D	Tarboro Tars	Coastal Plain League	Michael Kardish and F. L. "Bull" Hamons
D	Milford Red Sox	Eastern Shore League	Wally Millies
D	New Iberia Cardinals	Evangeline League	Aaron Ward

LEAGUE CHAMPIONS: Louisville, Scranton

Source: (Note: This table uses the Encyclopedia summary list for 1946, cross-checked with cited Baseball-Reference.com pages.)

Salem franchise moved to Lenoir on June 25, 1946

† Noel Casbier is listed as the sole manager for Salem/Lenoir by Baseball-Reference.com
