= 1947 Boston Red Sox season =

Major League Baseball season

1947 Boston Red Sox
- League: American League
- Ballpark: Fenway Park
- City: Boston, Massachusetts
- Record: 83–71 (.539)
- League place: 3rd
- Owners: Tom Yawkey
- President: Tom Yawkey
- General managers: Eddie Collins
- Managers: Joe Cronin
- Radio: WHDH (Jim Britt, Tom Hussey)
- Stats: ESPN.com; Baseball Reference

The 1947 Boston Red Sox season was the 47th season in the franchise's Major League Baseball history. The Red Sox finished third in the American League (AL) with a record of 83 wins and 71 losses, 14 games behind the New York Yankees, who went on to win the 1947 World Series.

Red Sox left fielder Ted Williams won the Triple Crown, leading the AL in home runs (32), runs batted in (114), and batting average (.343).

== Offseason ==
- November 1, 1946: Virgil Stallcup drafted from the Red Sox by the Cincinnati Reds in the 1946 rule 5 draft.
- November 17, 1946: Tom Poholsky was drafted from the Red Sox by the St. Louis Cardinals in the 1946 minor league draft.
- March 1947: Frankie Hayes was signed as a free agent by the Red Sox.

== Regular season ==
After a memorable 1946 season, the Red Sox added lights to Fenway Park for the first time. 1947 looked like another big year for Boston, but Boo Ferriss, Mickey Harris, and Tex Hughson all had arm trouble, and from 62 wins in 1946 they dropped to 29 in 1947. Boston finished 3rd, 21 wins less than their American League Championship season a year earlier, 14 games behind the eventual world champion New York Yankees. Joe Dobson was the top winner with 18 wins, and Ted Williams hit .343, with 32 homers and 114 RBIs, to secure his second Triple Crown.

On July 20, Hank Thompson and Willard Brown of the St. Louis Browns played against the Boston Red Sox. It was the first time that two black players appear in a major league game together since 1884.

=== Season standings ===
American League
Team	W	L	Pct.	GB	Home	Road
New York Yankees	97	57	.630	—	55‍–‍22	42‍–‍35
Detroit Tigers	85	69	.552	12	46‍–‍31	39‍–‍38
Boston Red Sox	83	71	.539	14	49‍–‍30	34‍–‍41
Cleveland Indians	80	74	.519	17	38‍–‍39	42‍–‍35
Philadelphia Athletics	78	76	.506	19	39‍–‍38	39‍–‍38
Chicago White Sox	70	84	.455	27	32‍–‍43	38‍–‍41
Washington Senators	64	90	.416	33	36‍–‍41	28‍–‍49
St. Louis Browns	59	95	.383	38	29‍–‍48	30‍–‍47

=== Record vs. opponents ===
1947 American League record Sources:
Team	BOS	CWS	CLE	DET	NYY	PHA	SLB	WSH
Boston	—	16–6–1	9–13	12–10–1	9–13	10–12–1	15–7	12–10
Chicago	6–16–1	—	11–11	7–15	10–12	11–11	11–11	14–8
Cleveland	13–9	11–11	—	8–14–2	7–15	11–11–1	17–5	13–9
Detroit	10–12–1	15–7	14–8–2	—	8–14–1	11–11	15–7	12–10
New York	13–9	12–10	15–7	14–8–1	—	13–9	15–7	15–7
Philadelphia	12–10–1	11–11	11–11–1	11–11	9–13	—	13–9	11–11
St. Louis	7–15	11–11	5–17	7–15	7–15	9–13	—	13–9
Washington	10–12	8–14	9–13	10–12	7–15	11–11	9–13	—

=== Opening Day lineup ===
39	Eddie Pellagrini	3B
6	Johnny Pesky	SS
7	Dom DiMaggio	CF
9	Ted Williams	LF
1	Bobby Doerr	2B
3	Rudy York	1B
14	Sam Mele	RF
8	Hal Wagner	C
21	Tex Hughson	P

=== Notable transactions ===
- May 20, 1947: Hal Wagner was traded to the Detroit Tigers for Birdie Tebbetts.
- May 21, 1947: Frankie Hayes was released.

=== Roster ===
1947 Boston Red Sox
Roster
Pitchers: 27 Bill Butland; 29 Cot Deal; 15 Joe Dobson; 20 Harry Dorish; 33 Dave Ferriss; 23 Tommy Fine; 25 Denny Galehouse; 19 Mickey Harris; 21 Tex Hughson; 12 Earl Johnson; 37 Bob Klinger; 38 Johnny Murphy; 17 Mel Parnell; 17 Eddie Smith; 42 Chuck Stobbs; 32 Al Widmar; 26 Bill Zuber	Catchers: 27 Leslie Aulds; 5 Matt Batts; 25 Frankie Hayes; 2 Eddie McGah; 16 Roy Partee; 8 Hal Wagner; 8 Birdie Tebbetts; Infielders: 32 Merl Combs; 17 Sam Dente; 1 Bobby Doerr; 10 Don Gutteridge; 3 Jake Jones; 39 Eddie Pellagrini; 6 Johnny Pesky; 5 Rip Russell; 29 Strick Shofner; 3 Rudy York	Outfielders: 11 Leon Culberson; 7 Dom DiMaggio; 28 Billy Goodman; 18 Tom McBride; 14 Sam Mele; 24 Wally Moses; 9 Ted Williams	Manager: 4 Joe Cronin; Coaches: 30 Del Baker (Third base); 31 Paul Schreiber (Hitting); 22 Larry Woodall (First base)

== Player stats ==
=== Batting ===
==== Starters by position ====
Note: Pos = Position; G = Games played; AB = At bats; H = Hits; Avg. = Batting average; HR = Home runs; RBI = Runs batted in

Pos	Player	G	AB	H	Avg.	HR	RBI
C	Birdie Tebbetts	90	291	87	.299	1	28
1B	Jake Jones	109	404	95	.235	16	76
2B	Bobby Doerr	146	561	145	.258	17	95
3B	Sam Dente	46	168	39	.232	0	11
SS	Johnny Pesky	155	638	207	.324	0	39
OF	Ted Williams	156	528	181	.343	32	114
OF	Sam Mele	123	453	137	.302	12	73
OF	Dom DiMaggio	136	513	145	.283	8	71

==== Other batters ====
Note: G = Games played; AB = At bats; H = Hits; Avg. = Batting average; HR = Home runs; RBI = Runs batted in

Player	G	AB	H	Avg.	HR	RBI
Wally Moses	90	255	70	.275	2	27
Eddie Pellagrini	74	231	47	.203	4	19
Rudy York	48	184	39	.212	6	27
Roy Partee	60	169	39	.231	0	16
Don Gutteridge	54	131	22	.168	2	5
Leon Culberson	47	84	20	.238	0	11
Merl Combs	17	68	15	.221	1	6
Hal Wagner	21	65	15	.231	0	6
Rip Russell	26	52	8	.154	1	3
Matt Batts	7	16	8	.500	1	5
Eddie McGah	9	14	0	.000	0	2
Strick Shofner	5	13	2	.154	0	0
Frankie Hayes	5	13	2	.154	0	1
Billy Goodman	12	11	2	.182	0	1
Tom McBride	2	5	1	.200	0	0
Leslie Aulds	3	4	1	.250	0	0

=== Pitching ===
==== Starting pitchers ====
Note: G = Games pitched; IP = Innings pitched; W = Wins; L = Losses; ERA = Earned run average; SO = Strikeouts

Player	G	IP	W	L	ERA	SO
Joe Dobson	33	228.2	18	8	2.95	110
Dave Ferriss	33	218.1	12	11	4.04	64
Tex Hughson	29	189.1	12	11	3.33	119
Denny Galehouse	21	149.0	11	7	3.32	38
Tommy Fine	9	36.0	1	2	5.50	10

==== Other pitchers ====
Note: G = Games pitched; IP = Innings pitched; W = Wins; L = Losses; ERA = Earned run average; SO = Strikeouts

Player	G	IP	W	L	ERA	SO
Earl Johnson	45	142.1	12	11	2.97	65
Fritz Dorish	41	136.0	7	8	4.70	50
Mickey Harris	15	51.2	5	4	2.44	35
Eddie Smith	8	17.0	1	3	7.41	15
Cot Deal	5	12.2	0	1	9.24	6
Chuck Stobbs	4	9.0	0	1	6.00	5

==== Relief pitchers ====
Note: G = Games pitched; W = Wins; L = Losses; SV = Saves; ERA = Earned run average; SO = Strikeouts

Player	G	W	L	SV	ERA	SO
Bob Klinger	28	1	1	5	3.86	12
Johnny Murphy	32	0	0	3	2.80	9
Bill Zuber	20	1	0	0	5.33	23
Al Widmar	2	0	0	0	13.50	1
Bill Butland	1	0	0	0	4.50	1

== Farm system ==
Level	Team	League	Manager
AAA	Louisville Colonels	American Association	Nemo Leibold
AAA	Toronto Maple Leafs	International League	Elmer Yoter
AA	New Orleans Pelicans	Southern Association	Fred Walters
A	Scranton Red Sox	Eastern League	Eddie Popowski
B	Lynn Red Sox	New England League	Mike Ryba
B	Roanoke Red Sox	Piedmont League	Pinky Higgins
C	San Jose Red Sox	California League	Marv Owen
C	Oneonta Red Sox	Canadian–American League	Red Marion
D	Milford Red Sox	Eastern Shore League	Wally Millies
D	Wellsville Nitros	PONY League	Tom Carey

LEAGUE CHAMPIONS: Roanoke
