= 1947 Philadelphia Athletics season =

1947 Philadelphia Athletics
- League: American League
- Ballpark: Shibe Park
- City: Philadelphia
- Record: 78–76 (.506)
- League place: 5th
- Owners: Connie Mack
- Managers: Connie Mack
- Television: WPTZ
- Radio: WIBG (By Saam, Chuck Thompson)

The 1947 Philadelphia Athletics season involved the A's finishing fifth in the American League with a record of 78 wins and 76 losses.

== History ==
Except for a fifth-place finish in 1944, the A's finished in last or next-to-last place every year from 1935–1946. In 1947, Connie Mack not only got the A's out of last place, but actually finished with a winning record for the first time in 14 years in a season that would be the first to be aired on television, sharing the same station (WPTZ) as their NL counterparts, the Phillies.

== Offseason ==
- December 1946: Lou Brissie was signed as an amateur free agent by the Athletics.
- December 13, 1946: Hal Epps was selected off waivers from the Athletics by the St. Louis Cardinals.

== Regular season ==
=== Season standings ===
American League
Team	W	L	Pct.	GB	Home	Road
New York Yankees	97	57	.630	—	55‍–‍22	42‍–‍35
Detroit Tigers	85	69	.552	12	46‍–‍31	39‍–‍38
Boston Red Sox	83	71	.539	14	49‍–‍30	34‍–‍41
Cleveland Indians	80	74	.519	17	38‍–‍39	42‍–‍35
Philadelphia Athletics	78	76	.506	19	39‍–‍38	39‍–‍38
Chicago White Sox	70	84	.455	27	32‍–‍43	38‍–‍41
Washington Senators	64	90	.416	33	36‍–‍41	28‍–‍49
St. Louis Browns	59	95	.383	38	29‍–‍48	30‍–‍47

=== Record vs. opponents ===
1947 American League record Sources:
Team	BOS	CWS	CLE	DET	NYY	PHA	SLB	WSH
Boston	—	16–6–1	9–13	12–10–1	9–13	10–12–1	15–7	12–10
Chicago	6–16–1	—	11–11	7–15	10–12	11–11	11–11	14–8
Cleveland	13–9	11–11	—	8–14–2	7–15	11–11–1	17–5	13–9
Detroit	10–12–1	15–7	14–8–2	—	8–14–1	11–11	15–7	12–10
New York	13–9	12–10	15–7	14–8–1	—	13–9	15–7	15–7
Philadelphia	12–10–1	11–11	11–11–1	11–11	9–13	—	13–9	11–11
St. Louis	7–15	11–11	5–17	7–15	7–15	9–13	—	13–9
Washington	10–12	8–14	9–13	10–12	7–15	11–11	9–13	—

=== Roster ===
1947 Philadelphia Athletics
Roster
Pitchers: 28 Lou Brissie; 17 Russ Christopher; 10,20 Joe Coleman; 16,18 Bill Dietrich; 19 Jesse Flores; 25 Dick Fowler; 21,23 Phil Marchildon; 23,36 Bill McCahan; 16,37 Bob Savage; 11,24 Carl Scheib	Catchers: 14 Herman Franks; 9 Mike Guerra; 8 Buddy Rosar; Infielders: 6,41 Dick Adams; 15 Pat Cooper; 5 Ferris Fain; 28 Nellie Fox; 2,15 Gene Handley; 1 Eddie Joost; 3 Hank Majeski; 6,14 Don Richmond; 31 Mickey Rutner; 12 Pete Suder	Outfielders: 11,47 George Binks; 4 Sam Chapman; 15,30,39 Austin Knickerbocker; 28 Chet Laabs; 7 Barney McCosky; 10,21 Elmer Valo; Other batters: 20,30 Tom Kirk; 31,45 Ray Poole	Manager: -- Connie Mack; Coaches: -- Lena Blackburne; 26 Earle Brucker, Sr.; 29 Dave Keefe; 27 Earle Mack; 32 Al Simmons

== Player stats ==
=== Batting ===
==== Starters by position ====
Note: Pos = Position; G = Games played; AB = At bats; H = Hits; Avg. = Batting average; HR = Home runs; RBI = Runs batted in

Pos	Player	G	AB	H	Avg.	HR	RBI
C	Buddy Rosar	102	359	93	.259	1	33
1B	Ferris Fain	136	461	134	.291	7	71
2B	Pete Suder	145	528	127	.241	5	60
3B	Hank Majeski	141	479	134	.280	8	72
SS	Eddie Joost	151	540	111	.206	13	64
OF	Elmer Valo	112	370	111	.300	5	36
OF	Barney McCosky	137	546	179	.328	1	52
OF	Sam Chapman	149	551	139	.252	14	83

==== Other batters ====
Note: G = Games played; AB = At bats; H = Hits; Avg. = Batting average; HR = Home runs; RBI = Runs batted in

Player	G	AB	H	Avg.	HR	RBI
George Binks	104	333	86	.258	2	34
Mike Guerra	72	209	45	.215	0	18
Gene Handley	36	90	23	.256	0	8
Dick Adams	37	89	18	.202	2	11
Austin Knickerbocker	21	48	12	.250	0	2
Mickey Rutner	12	48	12	.250	1	4
Chet Laabs	15	32	7	.219	1	5
Don Richmond	19	21	4	.190	0	4
Pat Cooper	13	16	4	.250	0	3
Herman Franks	8	15	3	.200	0	1
Ray Poole	13	13	3	.231	0	1
Nellie Fox	7	3	0	.000	0	0
Tom Kirk	1	1	0	.000	0	0

=== Pitching ===
==== Starting pitchers ====
Note: G = Games pitched; IP = Innings pitched; W = Wins; L = Losses; ERA = Earned run average; SO = Strikeouts

Player	G	IP	W	L	ERA	SO
Phil Marchildon	35	276.2	19	9	3.88	128
Dick Fowler	36	227.1	12	11	2.81	75
Bill McCahan	29	165.1	10	5	3.32	47
Joe Coleman	32	160.1	6	12	4.32	65
Jesse Flores	28	151.1	4	13	3.39	41
Bill Dietrich	11	60.2	5	2	3.12	18
Lou Brissie	1	7.0	0	1	6.43	4

==== Other pitchers ====
Note: G = Games pitched; IP = Innings pitched; W = Wins; L = Losses; ERA = Earned run average; SO = Strikeouts

Player	G	IP	W	L	ERA	SO
Bob Savage	44	146.0	8	10	3.76	56
Carl Scheib	21	116.0	4	6	5.04	26

==== Relief pitchers ====
Note: G = Games pitched; W = Wins; L = Losses; SV = Saves; ERA = Earned run average; SO = Strikeouts

Player	G	W	L	SV	ERA	SO
Russ Christopher	44	10	7	12	2.90	33

== Farm system ==
Level	Team	League	Manager
AA	Birmingham Barons	Southern Association	Dick Porter
A	Savannah Indians	Sally League	Tom Oliver and Jimmy Adair
A	Lincoln Athletics	Western League	Ham Schulte and Tom Oliver
B	Lancaster Red Roses	Interstate League	Charlie English and Clayton Sheedy
C	Martinsville Athletics	Carolina League	Joe Glenn and Woody Wheaton
C	Moline A's	Central Association	Woody Wheaton and Joe Glenn
C	Niagara Falls Fronters	Middle Atlantic League	Steve Mizerak
D	Welch Miners	Appalachian League	Walter Youse and Joe Bird
D	Federalsburg A's	Eastern Shore League	Pep Rambert
D	Nyack Rockies	North Atlantic League	Emil Schwab
D	Lexington Indians	North Carolina State League	Homer Lee Cox
D	Red Springs Red Robins	Tobacco State League	Red Norris

LEAGUE CHAMPIONS: Savannah
