= Ernie Andres =

American baseball player (1918–2008)

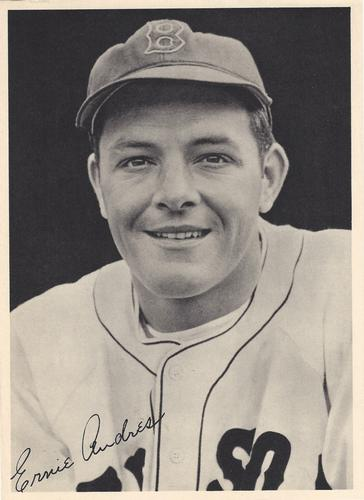
- Andres in 1946
- Third baseman
- Born: January 11, 1918; Jeffersonville, Indiana, U.S.
- Died: September 19, 2008 (aged 90); Bradenton, Florida, U.S.
- Batted: Right Threw: Right

MLB debut
- April 16, 1946, for the Boston Red Sox

Last MLB appearance
- May 16, 1946, for the Boston Red Sox

MLB statistics
- Batting average: .098
- Home runs: 0
- Runs batted in: 1
- Stats at Baseball Reference

Teams
- Boston Red Sox (1946)

Ernest Henry Andres (January 11, 1918 – September 19, 2008), nicknamed "Junie", was an American third baseman in Major League Baseball who played for the Boston Red Sox in the 1946 season. Born in Jeffersonville, Indiana, he batted and threw right-handed. Andres' professional career lasted from 1939 to 1941 and 1946 to 1947. He missed four seasons (1942–1945) while serving in the United States Navy in the Pacific Theater of Operations during World War II.

Andres appeared in 15 games played during the first month of the Red Sox' 1946 season. He was Boston's Opening Day third baseman as a rookie, and shared that position with Rip Russell through May 16. However, Andres' batting issues resulted in his demotion to the minor leagues. During his month in the Majors, he batted 41 times and his four hits included two doubles.

Andres was also a talented basketball player. He played varsity basketball for Indiana University, where he twice won the Balfour Award as the school's top athlete, and was named All-American and All-Big Ten Conference. He played professional basketball for the Indianapolis Kautskys of the National Basketball League, where in 1939–40 he was selected to the All-NBL Second Team. Andres was also inducted into the Indiana Basketball Hall of Fame in 1975.

From 1948 to 1973, Andres was the head baseball coach at Indiana University.
