= Leslie Aulds =

American baseball player (1920–1999)

- Catcher
- Born: December 28, 1920; Farmerville, Louisiana, U.S.
- Died: October 13, 1999 (aged 78); Hondo, Texas, U.S.
- Batted: Right Threw: Right

MLB debut
- May 25, 1947, for the Boston Red Sox

Last MLB appearance
- June 22, 1947, for the Boston Red Sox

MLB statistics
- Batting average: .250 (1-for-4)
- Home runs: 0
- Runs batted in: 0
- Stats at Baseball Reference

Teams
- Boston Red Sox (1947)

Leycester Doyle "Leslie" Aulds (Note: The SABR biography of Aulds lists his full name as Leycester Doyle Aulds; his World War II draft registration card lists his full name as Leslie Doyle Aulds.) (December 28, 1920 – October 13, 1999), also known as "Tex" Aulds, was an American professional baseball catcher. He appeared in three major-league games, all for the 1947 Boston Red Sox.

== Early life ==
Aulds was born in Farmerville, Louisiana, and raised in the Corpus Christi, Texas, area where he was an Eagle Scout and excelled at sports in high school. He was first signed by a scout from the Cincinnati Reds in 1941, and played 21 games for the Class C Tucson Cowboys in the Arizona-Texas League.

== Military service ==
Leslie Aulds
- Burial place: Hondo, Texas
- Military career
- Allegiance: United States
- Branch: United States Army Air Forces
- Service years: 1942–1945
- Rank: Sergeant
- Conflicts: World War II

Aulds joined the United States Army Air Forces in September 1942 and was stationed at Randolph Field in Texas. While there, he played both baseball and football, including an appearance in the 1944 Cotton Bowl Classic where he scored a touchdown. In 1945, Aulds transferred to Camp Pinedale in Fresno, California, where he continue to play baseball; he was released from military service late in 1945 at the rank of sergeant.

== Time with Red Sox organization ==
Aulds was signed by a Red Sox scout in 1946, and he played for the Scranton Red Sox of the Class A Eastern League. He appeared in 105 games, batting .263 and was named a first team all-star.

In 1947, Aulds started the seasons with the Louisville Colonels of the Class AAA American Association, however he sustained a spiking injury early in the season, after which he sat out for several weeks. In May, the Red Sox released their third-string catcher, Frankie Hayes, and Aulds was promoted to the major league club.

Aulds appeared in three games with the Red Sox, all as a catcher. The first was on May 25, when he entered a game the Red Sox were losing against the New York Yankees 10–0. He batted twice, collecting one hit off of Bill Bevens. His second appearance was May 30, when he entered a game the Red Sox were losing 10–4 to the Washington Senators; he batted once but did not get a hit. His final appearance was on June 22, when the Red Sox were losing 8–2 against the Cleveland Indians; again he batted once and was hitless. In those three games he caught a total of 9 innings, recording 7 putouts.

For the remainder of the 1947 season, Aulds played 32 games with the New Orleans Pelicans of the Class AA Southern Association, with a .245 batting average. In 1948, Aulds again played for Louisville, batting .235 and appearing in 104 games. In 1949, his final year in the Red Sox organization, he split time between Louisville where he batted .185 in 9 games, and Scranton where he batted .250 in 48 games.

== Later life ==
Aulds played semi-pro baseball in Texas during the 1950s, and for many years umpired in the collegiate Southwest Conference. He died at his home in Hondo, Texas, on October 13, 1999, while watching the television broadcast of the first game of the 1999 American League Championship Series.
