= Red Embree =

American baseball player (1917–1996)

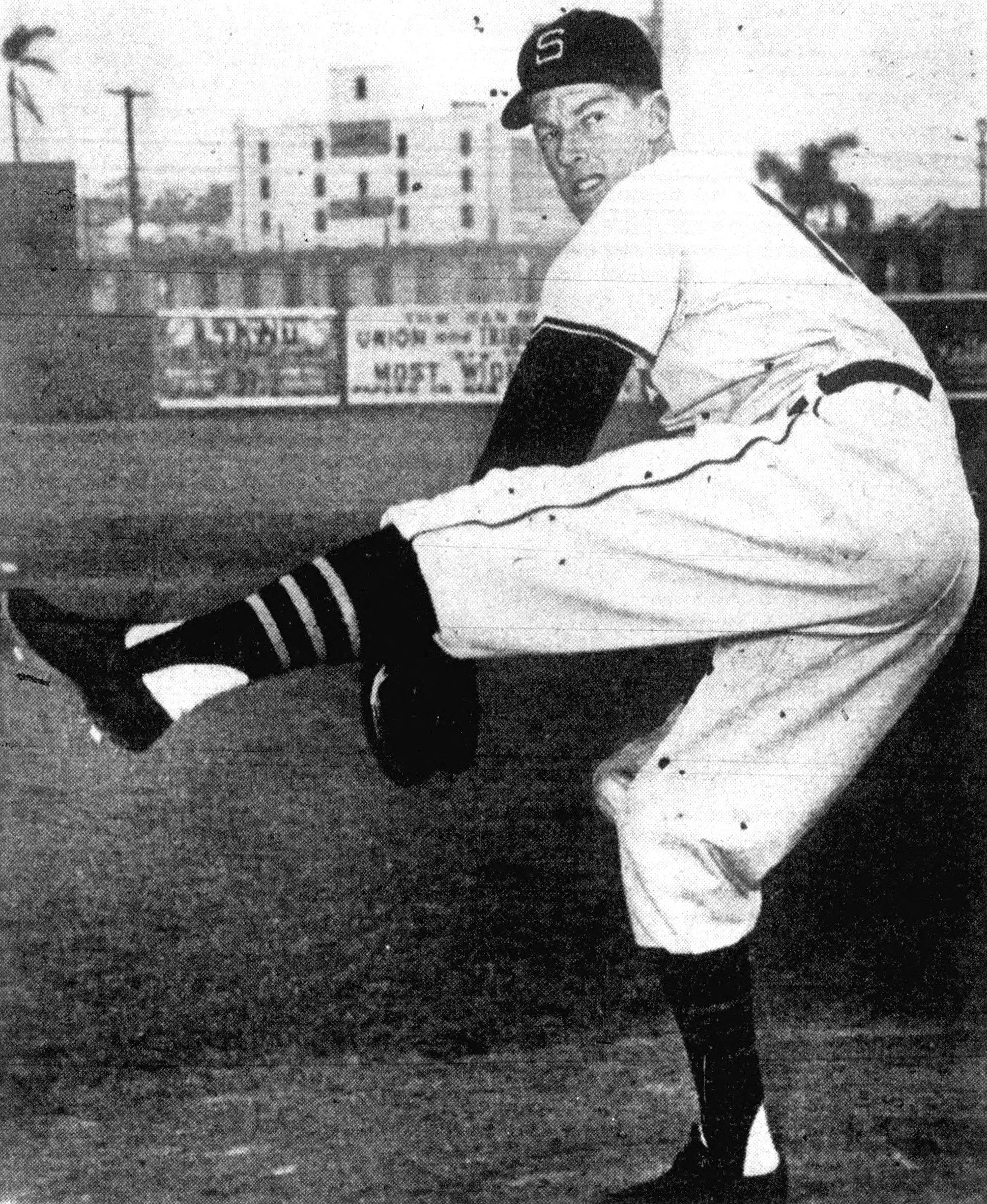
- Embree, circa 1950
- Pitcher
- Born: August 30, 1917; El Monte, California, U.S.
- Died: September 24, 1996 (aged 79); Eugene, Oregon, U.S.
- Batted: Right Threw: Right

MLB debut
- September 10, 1941, for the Cleveland Indians

Last MLB appearance
- October 2, 1949, for the St. Louis Browns

MLB statistics
- Win–loss record: 31–48
- Earned run average: 3.72
- Strikeouts: 286
- Stats at Baseball Reference

Teams
- Cleveland Indians (1941–1942, 1944–1947); New York Yankees (1948); St. Louis Browns (1949)

Charles Willard Embree (August 30, 1917 – September 24, 1996) was an American Major League Baseball pitcher. His key pitch was the curveball.

Nicknamed Red, due to his red hair, Emree joined the Cleveland Indians in 1939, and spent three seasons in their minor league system before joining the major league club in September 1941. After going 3–4 with a 3.86 earned run average for the Indians in 1942, he retired from baseball in order to become a farmer.

He returned to baseball in 1944 with some bravado, claiming during Spring training that he would win fifteen games for the Indians that season. That did not happen, however, he did lead the International League with nineteen wins. He had a stellar minor league career with the Indians, going 74–44 with a 3.07 ERA in their farm system, but it never translated to major league success, mostly due to some hard luck. In 1946, Embree held batters to a .227 batting average, yet he had a losing record (8–12). Despite a respectable 3.29 ERA over parts of six seasons with the Indians, his record was 23–32.

Following the 1947 season, he was dealt to the New York Yankees for outfielder Allie Clark. He started his one season in New York City, in the starting rotation, and was reasonably successful in that role (5–2 with a 3.29 ERA) before moving into the bullpen. At the end of the season, he, Sherm Lollar and Dick Starr, plus $100,000 were sent to the St. Louis Browns for Roy Partee and Fred Sanford.

Embree was once again a starter when he arrived in St. Louis, however, once again lost his starting job when a July 7 loss to the Detroit Tigers in which he lasted just two-thirds of an inning dropped his record to 3–10 with a 5.03 ERA. He made three spot starts after that, going 0–2 with a 12.96 ERA. For the season, he went 3–13 with a 5.37 ERA and a save.

His contract was repurchased by the Indians prior to the start of the 1950 season. He went 31–28 with a 3.96 ERA in two plus seasons with the Pacific Coast League's San Diego Padres before moving to the Chicago White Sox organization during the 1952 season.

== Career stats ==
W	L	PCT	ERA	G	GS	CG	SHO	SV	IP	H	ER	R	HR	BAA	BB	K	WP	HBP	Fld%	Avg
31	48	.392	3.72	141	90	29	1	1	707	653	292	334	50	.246	330	286	14	10	.961	.166

Over seven minor league seasons, Embree was 100-73 with a 3.49 ERA.
