= Lou Knerr =

American baseball player (1921–1980)

- Pitcher
- Born: August 21, 1921; Denver, Pennsylvania, U.S.
- Died: March 27, 1980 (aged 58); Reading, Pennsylvania, U.S.
- Batted: Right Threw: Right

MLB debut
- April 17, 1945, for the Philadelphia Athletics

Last MLB appearance
- June 7, 1947, for the Washington Senators

MLB statistics
- Win–loss record: 8–27
- Earned run average: 5.04
- Strikeouts: 104
- Stats at Baseball Reference

Teams
- Philadelphia Athletics (1945–1946); Washington Senators (1947)

Wallace Luther Knerr (August 21, 1921 – March 23, 1980) was an American professional baseball pitcher who appeared in 63 games in Major League Baseball from 1945 to 1947 as a member of the Philadelphia Athletics and Washington Senators.

The son of a Lutheran pastor, Knerr was a native of Lancaster County, Pennsylvania, born in Strasburg and raised in the borough of Denver. He attended Muhlenberg College.

Knerr threw and batted right-handed and was listed as 6 feet 1 inch (1.85 m) tall and 210 pounds (95 kg). His professional career began in 1941, and in its first four seasons, he posted double-digit win totals until reaching Connie Mack's Athletics in 1945.

Hurling for a last-place team in the final year of the World War II manpower shortage, he posted a won–lost record of 5–11 and an earned run average of 4.22 in 130 innings pitched. Knerr turned in his best MLB pitching performance on July 7, 1945. Starting against the Chicago White Sox at Comiskey Park, he allowed only one run—on a first-inning steal of home by Wally Moses—and six hits in eight innings. But his Athletics were shut out by Bill Dietrich, who scattered nine hits.

Knerr kept his major-league job in 1946, when war veterans resumed their baseball careers. Appearing in 30 games, including 22 starts, for an abysmal team that won only 49 games all season, he lost 16 of his 19 decisions. The 16 defeats tied Knerr for the American League lead in games lost with two other Philadelphia pitchers, Canadian right-handers Dick Fowler and Phil Marchildon.

The following February, the Athletics traded him to Washington with fellow pitcher Lum Harris for outfielder George Binks. Knerr appeared in only seven games out of the 1947 Senators' bullpen before being sent to the minor leagues, where he finished his pro baseball career in 1950.

In his 63 MLB appearances, Knerr compiled an 8–27 (.229) record with an ERA of 5.04, with 11 complete games and 12 games finished. In 2871/3 innings pitched, he permitted 330 hits and 149 bases on balls, striking out 104 batters.
