= Eddie McGah =

American baseball player (1921–2002)

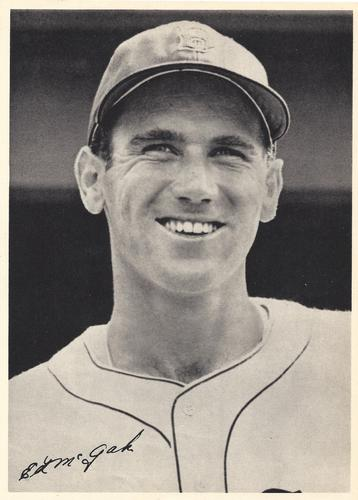
- Catcher
- Born: September 30, 1921; Oakland, California, US
- Died: September 30, 2002 (aged 81); Oakland, California, US
- Batted: Right Threw: Right

MLB debut
- April 26, 1946, for the Boston Red Sox

Last MLB appearance
- September 21, 1947, for the Boston Red Sox

MLB statistics
- Batting average: .157
- Home runs: 0
- Runs batted in: 3
- Stats at Baseball Reference

Teams
- Boston Red Sox (1946–1947)

Edward Joseph McGah (September 30, 1921 – September 30, 2002) also known as E.J. McGah, was an American reserve catcher in Major League Baseball who played with the Boston Red Sox for parts of the 1946 and 1947 seasons. Listed at 6 ft 0 in (1.83 m), 183 lb (83 kg), McGah batted and threw right-handed. He was born in Oakland, California. After his baseball career, he and his father (Edward J. and Edward W., respectively) were minority owners in the Oakland Raiders.

== Path to the majors ==
McGah attended Roosevelt High School in Oakland, and after graduating was signed by a Red Sox scout. McGah first played in the Boston minor league system in 1940, with the Canton Terriers of the Class C Middle Atlantic League; his season was cut short by a knee injury. In 1941 he began the season with the Oneonta Indians of the Class C Canadian–American League, then moved up to the Scranton Red Sox of the Class A Eastern League. He was still with Scranton in 1942, but again had his season cut short by knee problems. Records for his early seasons are incomplete; the available records cover 125 games where he batted 147-for-458 (.321).

Later in 1942 he joined the US Navy, where he spent the next three years in military service during World War II – he was stationed, and excelled while playing baseball on military teams, in Oakland and Hawaii.

== Boston Red Sox ==
McGah was the third-string catcher for Boston for much of the 1946 season. He played sparingly, behind more experienced catchers Hal Wagner and Roy Partee. Frankie Pytlak had also started the year catching with the team, but his last appearance was April 25, the day before McGah's first appearance. In 15 games played – two in April, three in May, six in June, and four in September – McGah batted 8-for-37 (.216) with just 1 RBI. The Red Sox went to the 1946 World Series, losing in seven games to the Cardinals, but McGah did not play in the postseason.

At the start of the 1947 season, McGah was optioned to the Triple-A Louisville Colonels of the American Association. He appeared in 59 games with the Colonels, batting .218 with 6 home runs and 16 RBI. He did play in 9 games with Boston –1 game in both July and August, then 7 games in September – however was hitless in 14 at bats.

In parts of two seasons with Boston, he was a .157 hitter (8-for-51) with 3 runs scored and 3 RBI in 24 games. In 21 catching appearances, he committed 2 errors in 81 total chances for a .975 fielding percentage.

== After the majors ==
In 1948, McGah, now playing third base, closed out his time in the Red Sox organization with 35 games for Scranton, hitting .248 and again experiencing knee problems.

After his baseball career, he and his father were part-owners of the Oakland Raiders football team. That ownership stake was the subject of a lawsuit, after McGah died in his hometown in 2002, on the day of his 81st birthday. Some remaining members of his family run a pub, which carries the family name, in Danville, California.

== See also ==
- Las Vegas Raiders Ownership
