= Strick Shofner =

American baseball player (1919–1998)

- Third baseman
- Born: July 23, 1919; Crawford, Texas, U.S.
- Died: October 10, 1998 (aged 79); Crawford, Texas, U.S.
- Batted: Left Threw: Right

MLB debut
- April 19, 1947, for the Boston Red Sox

Last MLB appearance
- April 29, 1947, for the Boston Red Sox

MLB statistics
- Batting average: .154
- Home runs: 0
- Runs scored: 0
- Stats at Baseball Reference

Teams
- Boston Red Sox (1947)

Frank Strickland Shofner (July 23, 1919 – October 10, 1998) was an American third baseman in Major League Baseball. Listed at 5' 10.5", 187 lb.; he batted left-handed and threw right-handed.

A native of Crawford, Texas, Shofner played briefly for the Boston Red Sox during the 1947 season. In five games, he was a .154 hitter (2-for-13) with one run and one triple without home runs or RBI.

At the end of the season, Shofner was sent by Boston along with pitcher Tommy Fine to Triple-A San Francisco Seals in exchange for utility player Neill Sheridan.

Shofner died in Waco, Texas, at the age of 79.
