= Clem Dreisewerd =

American baseball player (1916–2001)

- Pitcher
- Born: January 24, 1916; Old Monroe, Missouri, U.S.
- Died: September 11, 2001 (aged 85); Ocean Springs, Mississippi, U.S.
- Batted: Left Threw: Left

MLB debut
- August 29, 1944, for the Boston Red Sox

Last MLB appearance
- August 2, 1948, for the New York Giants

MLB statistics
- Win–loss record: 6–8
- Strikeouts: 39
- Earned run average: 4.54
- Stats at Baseball Reference

Teams
- Boston Red Sox (1944–46); St. Louis Browns (1948); New York Giants (1948)

Clemens Johann "Steamboat" Dreisewerd (January 24, 1916 – September 11, 2001) was an American pitcher in Major League Baseball who played for three different teams between 1944 and 1948. Listed at 6 ft 1.5 in (1.87 m), 195 lb., Dreisewerd batted and threw left-handed. He was born in Old Monroe, Missouri.

In 1944, while pitching for Sacramento, Dreisewerd turned things around recording 20 wins and a 1.61 ERA, the lowest of the Pacific Coast League pitchers. Finally, he reached the majors late in the season with the Boston Red Sox, ending with a 2–4 mark in seven starts. After appearing in only two games in 1945, he was recruited by the U.S. Navy near the end of World War II. While in the Navy, he pitched for a team that included major leaguers as Mickey Owen, Jim Konstanty and Eddie Yost. He was discharged in time for the start of the 1946 season with Boston.

Dreisewerd enjoyed his most productive season with the 1946 American League champion Red Sox, going 4–1 in 20 games pitched in relief, except for one start. He also pitched 1/3 of an inning in Game 4 of the memorable 1946 World Series between the Red Sox and St. Louis Cardinals, retiring Enos Slaughter, who had four hits and needed another to set a Series record.

In 1947, Dreisewerd was sent down to the Red Sox Class Triple-A farm team in Louisville, and led the American Association pitchers with 18 wins and a 2.15 ERA. He divided his playing time with the St. Louis Browns and New York Giants in 1948, his last major league season.

In a four-season career, Dreisewerd posted a 6–8 record with 39 strikeouts and a 4.54 ERA in 46 appearances, including 10 starts, three complete games, two saves and 140.2 innings pitched.

In October 1948 Dreisewerd tried winter baseball in Venezuela, but after a month a coup d'état caused the suspension of the baseball season. A year later he developed severe arm problems, and after unsuccessful tries with various minor league teams he was convinced that his baseball career was finished.

After retiring from baseball, Dreisewerd worked as a construction contractor, building homes in the New Orleans area, where he lived for 50 years. By 1999, he was legally blind with macular degeneration. He died in Ocean Springs, Mississippi of head injuries suffered in a fall during a vacation.
