= Bill Butland =

American baseball player (1918–1997)

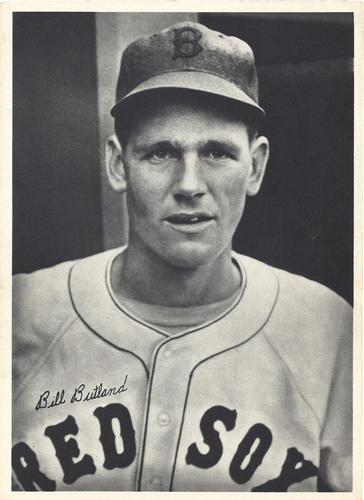
- Pitcher
- Born: March 22, 1918; Terre Haute, Indiana, U.S.
- Died: September 19, 1997 (aged 79); Terre Haute, Indiana, U.S.
- Batted: Right Threw: Left

MLB debut
- May 29, 1940, for the Boston Red Sox

Last MLB appearance
- May 10, 1947, for the Boston Red Sox

MLB statistics
- Win–loss record: 9–3
- Earned run average: 3.88
- Strikeouts: 62
- Stats at Baseball Reference

Teams
- Boston Red Sox (1940, 1942, 1946–1947)

Wilburn Rue Butland (March 22, 1918 – September 19, 1997) was an American professional baseball pitcher who appeared in 32 games in Major League Baseball for the Boston Red Sox over four seasons between 1940 and 1947. Born in Terre Haute, Indiana, Butland batted right-handed and threw left-handed. He was listed as 6 feet 5 inches (1.96 m) tall and 185 pounds (84 kg).

In his four-season MLB career, Butland posted a 9–3 record with 62 strikeouts and a 3.88 earned run average in 1502/3 innings pitched. His lone full season in the majors was 1942, in which he appeared in 23 games, won seven, lost one, threw two shutouts and six complete games, and posted a sparkling 2.51 ERA. He handled 46 total chances (15 putouts, 31 assists) in his major league career without an error for a perfect 1.000 fielding percentage.

Butland's pro career lasted from 1936 through 1950, although he missed three seasons due to service in the United States Army during World War II. He died in Terre Haute at age 79 on September 19, 1997.
