= Tom Kirk (baseball) =

American baseball player

- Outfielder
- Born: September 27, 1927; Philadelphia, Pennsylvania, U.S.
- Died: August 1, 1974 (aged 46); Philadelphia, Pennsylvania, U.S.
- Batted: Left Threw: Left

MLB debut
- June 24, 1947, for the Philadelphia Athletics

Last MLB appearance
- June 24, 1947, for the Philadelphia Athletics

MLB statistics
- Batting average: .000
- Games: 1
- At bats: 1
- Stats at Baseball Reference

Teams
- Philadelphia Athletics (1947)

Thomas Daniel Kirk (September 27, 1927 – August 1, 1974) was an American professional baseball player. He was an outfielder for one season (1947) with the Philadelphia Athletics. For his career, he was hitless in one at-bat in one game.

He was born and later died in Philadelphia at the age of 46.
