= Randy Heflin =

American baseball player (1918–1999)

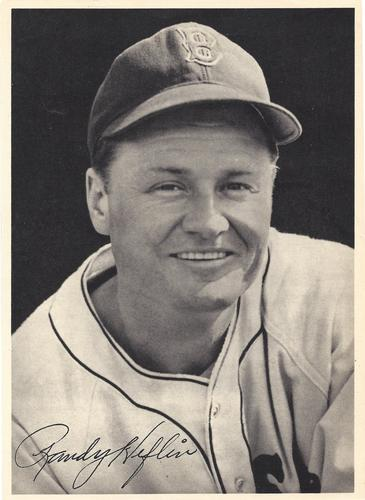
- Pitcher
- Born: September 11, 1918; Fredericksburg, Virginia, U.S.
- Died: August 17, 1999 (aged 80); Fredericksburg, Virginia, U.S.
- Batted: Left Threw: Right

MLB debut
- June 9, 1945, for the Boston Red Sox

Last MLB appearance
- June 12, 1946, for the Boston Red Sox

MLB statistics
- Win–loss record: 4–11
- Earned run average: 3.86
- Strikeouts: 45
- Stats at Baseball Reference

Teams
- Boston Red Sox (1945–1946)

Randolph Rutherford Heflin (September 11, 1918 – August 17, 1999) was an American professional baseball player, a right-handed pitcher who appeared in 25 games in Major League Baseball for the 1945–46 Boston Red Sox. Listed at 6 ft 0 in (1.83 m), 185 pounds (84 kg), Heflin was born in Fredericksburg, Virginia.

Heflin's pro career extended from 1939 to 1952, although he missed the 1943–44 seasons while serving in the United States Navy during World War II. He returned to baseball during the final year of the war, winning three of five decisions for the top-level Louisville Colonels before the Red Sox recalled him. Working in 20 games, Heflin made 14 starting assignments for the BoSox and registered six complete games. He threw two complete-game shutouts: a four-hitter August 10 against the eventual world champion Detroit Tigers and a six-hitter September 20 against the last-place Philadelphia Athletics. But Heflin compiled only a 4–10 won-lost record.

In 1946, the first postwar year, Heflin appeared in five games for the Red Sox between April 21 and June 12, including one start, and lost his only decision. Sent back to the minor leagues, Heflin spent the rest of 1946 at Louisville and eventually became a player-manager in the lower levels of the minors in the Class D Coastal Plain and Class C Evangeline leagues.

In his two-season MLB career, Heflin posted a 4–11 record with 45 strikeouts and a 3.86 earned run average in 25 appearances, including 15 starts, six complete games, six games finished and 116 2/3 innings of work. He allowed 118 hits and 73 bases on balls.

Randy Heflin died in Fredericksburg at age 80.
