= Earl Johnson (baseball) =

American baseball player and scout (1919–1994)

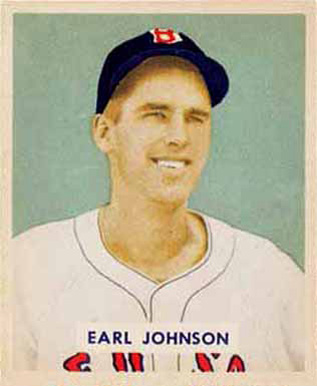
- Pitcher
- Born: April 2, 1919; Redmond, Washington, U.S.
- Died: December 3, 1994 (aged 75); Seattle, Washington, U.S.
- Batted: Left Threw: Left

MLB debut
- July 20, 1940, for the Boston Red Sox

Last MLB appearance
- June 3, 1951, for the Detroit Tigers

MLB statistics
- Win–loss record: 40–32
- Earned run average: 4.30
- Strikeouts: 250
- Stats at Baseball Reference

Teams
- Boston Red Sox (1940–1941, 1946–1950); Detroit Tigers (1951)

Earl Douglas Johnson (April 2, 1919 – December 3, 1994) was an American professional baseball player and scout and a decorated World War II veteran. He was a left-handed pitcher for the Boston Red Sox and the Detroit Tigers. Johnson, who was nicknamed the "smiling Swedish southpaw", had a brother Chet who also pitched in the major leagues for the St. Louis Browns. He was born in Redmond, Washington.

== Army life ==
Earl Johnson was also a World War II veteran, having served with the Army 120th Infantry Regiment, 30th Infantry Division. He enlisted in December 1941 and during that time he was awarded a Silver and Bronze Star and was commissioned a lieutenant.

On the Bronze Star, it read:

On September 30, 1944, in Germany, during heavy concentration of hostile fire, a friendly truck was struck by an enemy shell and had to be abandoned. The fact that the vehicle contained vital radio equipment made it imperative that it be recovered before falling into enemy hands. Sergeant Earl Johnson and several other members of his unit were assigned to this hazardous mission. They courageously braved severe hostile fire and were completely successful in dragging the vehicle over an area in plain view of the enemy

— Bronze Star

== Baseball career ==
Johnson's Major League Baseball debut was on July 20, 1940. During eight seasons, He pitched for the Boston Red Sox and the Detroit Tigers. He also pitched two years at Saint Mary's College of California and four years in the minor leagues (three at Triple-A). His final MLB game was on June 3, 1951. Nowlin then worked for the Red Sox as a west coast scout from 1953 to 1985 and during his time, he helped sign players such as Ted Bowsfield, Mike Garman and Steve Lyons.

== Personal life and death ==
Johnson was married and had two children. He owned and operated a laundromat in the Ballard neighborhood of Seattle, Washington.

At the age of 75, he died in Seattle in 1994 after suffering a stroke.
