= Slaughter's Mad Dash =

Event in the 1946 World Series

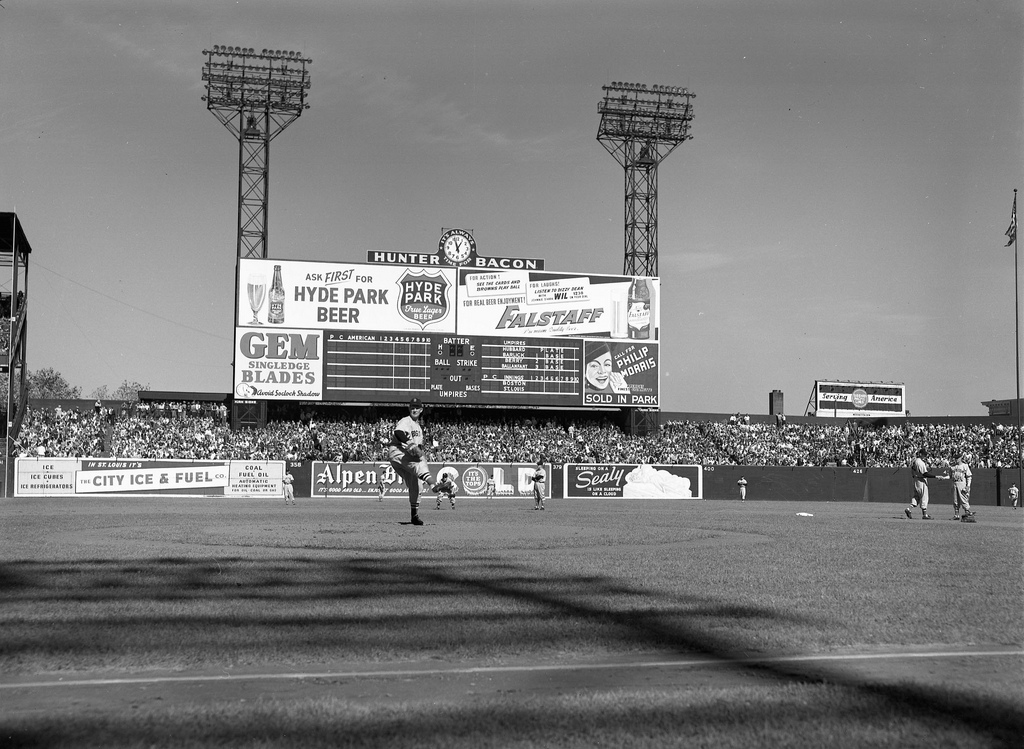
Sportsman's Park in St. Louis, venue of Slaughter's Mad Dash

The Mad Dash, or Slaughter's Mad Dash, refers to an event during the bottom of the eighth inning in Game 7 of the 1946 World Series between the St. Louis Cardinals and the Boston Red Sox. With the score tied 3–3 and with two outs, St. Louis' Harry Walker hit a line drive into left-center field, allowing Enos Slaughter to score from first base during a hit and run play. It has been debated whether Slaughter ignored third base coach Mike González's stop sign as he made his "mad dash" for home plate. It has been further debated whether Boston shortstop Johnny Pesky was surprised and hesitated for a split second after Slaughter rounded third base, and that caused Pesky's throw to home plate to not get there in time. St. Louis went on to win the game and World Series with the score of 4–3.

== Background ==
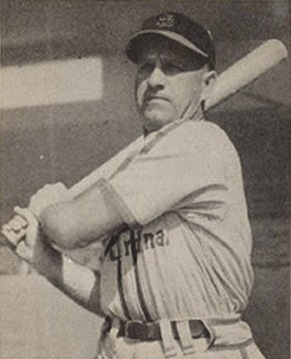
Enos Slaughter

=== Personnel involved ===
Player	Team	Position
Enos Slaughter	St. Louis Cardinals	Baserunner
Harry Walker	St. Louis Cardinals	Batter
Mike González	St. Louis Cardinals	Third base coach
Bob Klinger	Boston Red Sox	Pitcher
Leon Culberson	Boston Red Sox	Center fielder
Johnny Pesky	Boston Red Sox	Shortstop
Roy Partee	Boston Red Sox	Catcher

=== Context ===
The 1946 Boston Red Sox ran away with the American League crown, finishing 12 games ahead of the Detroit Tigers with a 104–50 record. The Red Sox were heavy favorites in the World Series against the St. Louis Cardinals. Boston led the series, three games to two, as it headed back to Sportsman's Park in St. Louis for Game 6. The Cardinals won that game with sensational defense and a brilliant pitching performance by Harry Brecheen to bring the series to a deciding seventh game.

Game 7 was played in Sportsman's Park on October 15, 1946. After Red Sox center fielder Dom DiMaggio drove in two runs in the top of the eighth, the score was tied 3–3. DiMaggio pulled a hamstring during the play and was forced to leave the game; his place was taken by pinch runner Leon Culberson, who remained in the game as DiMaggio's replacement in center field in the bottom of the inning.

Cardinal right fielder Enos Slaughter led off with a single off of pitcher Bob Klinger. After a failed bunt attempt by Whitey Kurowski and a flyout to left field by Del Rice, Slaughter found himself still on first base with two outs. Left fielder Harry Walker stepped to the plate and, after the count reached two balls and one strike, Cardinals manager Eddie Dyer called for a hit-and-run.

== The play ==
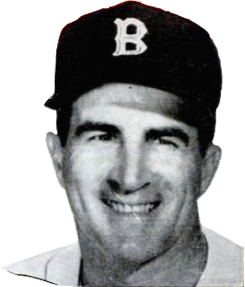
Johnny Pesky

With the hit-and-run on, Slaughter was running on the pitch, and with two outs, he was at full speed when Walker lined the pitch into left-center field. Culberson fielded the ball, then threw a relay to shortstop Johnny Pesky. Slaughter rounded third base, where legend says he ran through third base coach Mike González's stop sign and headed for home, while a stunned Pesky "held the ball", hesitating when he should have fired home immediately, costing the Red Sox the seventh and deciding game of the World Series.

The validity of this description, however, has been hotly debated ever since. While some claimed that Pesky, assuming that Slaughter would not be running home, checked Walker at first base, instead of immediately firing home, and others contended that Pesky was so shocked to see Slaughter attempting to score, that he had a mental lapse which accounted for a delay, neither of these claims have borne out to be definitively true. The notion that Pesky unnecessarily held the ball has also been called into question; the replay does not conclusively show such hesitation, and other contemporaneous accounts suggest that Pesky promptly executed his relay throw to home plate. In addition, several reports state that the third base coach was in fact frantically waving Slaughter around third, not attempting to stop him. Either way, Slaughter scored just as Red Sox catcher Roy Partee caught Pesky's relay up the line from home plate.

=== Official scoring ===
Walker's hit was scored as a double, although some contend that it could have been scored a single, with Walker advancing to second on the throw home.

== Aftermath ==
The run put the Cardinals ahead 4–3 and proved to be the winning run of the decisive seventh game. In Boston, "Pesky held the ball" became a catchphrase, although a possible poor throw from Culberson may have been more to blame. Slaughter himself later admitted that if DiMaggio had still been in the game, he never would have considered trying to score on the play. In St. Louis, a statue depicting Slaughter sliding across home plate at the end of the play stands outside the current ballpark. This play was named #10 on the Sporting News list of Baseball's 25 Greatest Moments in 1999.

== See also ==
- Curse of the Bambino
- List of nicknamed MLB games and plays
