= Roy Partee =

American baseball player (1917–2000)

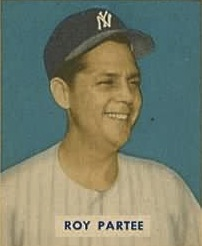
- Partee's 1949 Bowman Gum baseball card
- Catcher
- Born: September 7, 1917; Los Angeles, California, U.S.
- Died: December 27, 2000 (aged 83); Eureka, California, U.S.
- Batted: Right Threw: Right

MLB debut
- April 23, 1943, for the Boston Red Sox

Last MLB appearance
- October 3, 1948, for the St. Louis Browns

MLB statistics
- Batting average: .250
- Home runs: 2
- Runs batted in: 114
- Stats at Baseball Reference

Teams
- Boston Red Sox (1943–1944, 1946–1947); St. Louis Browns (1948)

Roy Robert Partee (September 7, 1917 – December 27, 2000) was an American Major League Baseball catcher. Listed at 5 ft 10 in (1.78 m), 180 lb (82 kg), Partee was nicknamed "the Little Round Man." He is likely best remembered as the man behind the plate for Enos Slaughter's "mad dash" in game seven of the 1946 World Series and as the New York Mets scout responsible for signing Bud Harrelson, Tug McGraw, Rick Aguilera and Gregg Jeffries, among others.

== Path to the majors ==
Partee was born in Los Angeles to father Clair C. Partee and mother Eutha Wyche. He was an Arizona–Texas League All-Star in 1938 when he batted .365 with nine home runs for the Bisbee Bees. His performance got him signed with the Chicago Cubs' St. Joseph Angels the following season, however, after batting .245 with five home runs, he was let go. He returned to the Bees in 1940, now the Salt Lake City Bees of the Pioneer League, and resumed his hitting ways, batting .284 with seven home runs while also showing a dramatic increase in defensive skills.

He joined the San Francisco Seals in 1941 (at the time, a Detroit Tigers affiliate), but managed to bat just .180 in 65 plate appearances. When coach Tony Lazzeri left the club to manage the Portsmouth Cubs in 1942, he brought Partee along with him back to the Cubs organization. He batted .299 and committed only four errors behind the plate in 560 chances. After the season, his contract was purchased by the Boston Red Sox.

== Boston Red Sox ==
=== 1943–1944 ===
Upon his arrival in Boston in 1943, Partee was immediately plugged into the starting line-up for the Red Sox and batted .300 for most of the season (he would finish at .281) in the number eight hole in their batting order, while starting 86 games at catcher. In 1944 he started 76 games as catcher and was called up by the U.S. Military in June, but was rejected due to a bad ankle. He returned to the Red Sox, and in his first game back he clubbed his first major league home run, a walk-off to defeat Atley Donald and the New York Yankees, 8–7. He finished the season with a .243 batting average, and then enlisted at Fort MacArthur in California on October 19, 1944 thus missing the 1945 season due to his military service during World War II.

=== 1946 Season ===
When Partee returned to the Red Sox in 1946, he was relegated to back-up catching duties behind All-Star Hal Wagner, and while Partee only started 32 games he batted for a career-best .315 average. That year, the Red Sox ran away with the American League crown by twelve games over the Detroit Tigers with a 104–50 record, and were heavy favorites in the World Series against the St. Louis Cardinals, however the series went the full seven games.

In game seven, Partee was involved in a famous play known as the "mad dash". The Red Sox had tied the score at 3–3 in the top half of the eighth inning, and Partee entered the game as catcher, replacing Rip Russell who had pinch hit for starting catcher Hal Wagner. Enos Slaughter led off the bottom half of the inning with a single. After the next two batters failed to advance him, Slaughter found himself still on first base with two outs. With outfielder Harry Walker at the plate with a two balls and one strike count, the Cardinals called for a hit and run. With Slaughter running, Walker lined the ball to left-center field. Leon Culberson fielded the ball, and threw a relay to shortstop Johnny Pesky. Slaughter rounded third base heading for home, running through the stop sign from his third base coach. What exactly happened when Pesky turned around is still a matter of contention, but Partee caught a delayed throw up the line, allowing Slaughter to score what proved to be the winning run.

In the top of the ninth inning, Partee batted for the Red Sox with men on first and third with one out; however he fouled out to first baseman Stan Musial for the second out of the inning, and the next batter, Tom McBride, grounded out to give the Cardinals the championship. Partee finished the series batting one-for-ten with one RBI and one walk; it was the only postseason series of his career.

=== 1947 Season ===
In 1947, Partee's final year with Boston, he platooned with Birdie Tebbetts behind the plate. Partee started 45 games as catcher, and his hitting declined to a .231 average for the season.

== St. Louis Browns ==
In November 1947 Partee was part of a blockbuster trade as he, Pete Layden, Eddie Pellagrini, Al Widmar and Jim Wilson, plus two players to be named later and an undisclosed amount of cash (eventually, only one player, Joe Ostrowski, and $310,000) were sent to the St. Louis Browns for Jack Kramer and Vern Stephens. For the 1948 season Partee batted just .203 with seventeen RBIs platooning with Les Moss in his only year with the Browns. In December 1948, Partee was part of a second blockbuster deal, as he and Fred Sanford were sent to the New York Yankees for Red Embree, Sherm Lollar, Dick Starr and $100,000.

== Return to the minors ==
Partee never made a major league appearance with the Yankees. Instead, he spent the 1949 and 1950 seasons back with the San Francisco Seals, 1951 and 1952 seasons with the Kansas City Blues, and split the 1954 season between the Sacramento Solons and Edmonton Eskimos. In 1955, he became player/manager of the California League's Stockton Ports, and led his club to a 94–53 record. In his three seasons at the helm, Stockton went 238–189, and he actually pitched in a couple of games. In 1959, he managed the Eugene Emeralds. Though he was retired as a player, he inserted himself into the line-up for one game, and went two-for-three.

== Career stats ==
Seasons	Games	PA	AB	Runs	Hits	2B	3B	HR	RBI	SB	BB	SO	Avg.	Slg.	OBP	Fld%	PB	CS%
5	367	1245	1090	89	273	41	5	2	114	2	132	120	.250	.303	.334	.982	23	36%

He was considered one of the better fielding catchers of his era, however, he had little power, clubbing only two home runs in his five-year major league career. In 1234 minor league games, he batted .268 with 36 home runs. He batted and threw right-handed.

== Post-playing career ==
When the New York Mets were established in 1962, Partee came aboard as a scout and would play a huge part in signing many of the Mets for the next 23 years before retiring. Partee died in Eureka, California, at the age of 83.
