= Mickey Rutner =

American baseball player (1919-2007)

- Third baseman
- Born: March 18, 1919; Hempstead, New York, U.S.
- Died: October 17, 2007 (aged 88); Georgetown, Texas, U.S.
- Batted: Right Threw: Right

MLB debut
- September 11, 1947, for the Philadelphia Athletics

Last MLB appearance
- September 28, 1947, for the Philadelphia Athletics

MLB statistics
- Batting average: .250
- Home runs: 1
- Runs batted in: 4
- Stats at Baseball Reference

Teams
- Philadelphia Athletics (1947)

Milton "Mickey" Rutner (March 18, 1919 – October 17, 2007) was an American third baseman in Major League Baseball who played briefly with the Philadelphia Athletics during the 1947 season. Listed at 5 ft 11 in (1.80 m), 190 lb., Rutner batted and threw right-handed. He was born in Hempstead, New York, and was Jewish. He attended James Monroe High School, and St. John's University in Brooklyn, New York.

In a 12-game career, Rutner was a .250 hitter (12-for-48) with one home run and four RBI, including one double and four runs. In 11 third base appearances, he recorded five putouts with 18 assists and committed three errors in 26 chances for a .885 fielding percentage.

Rutner died in Georgetown, Texas at age 88.

He is the basis for the main character, Mike Kutner, in the Eliot Asinof novel, Man On Spikes.
