= Leon Culberson =

American baseball player (1919–1989)

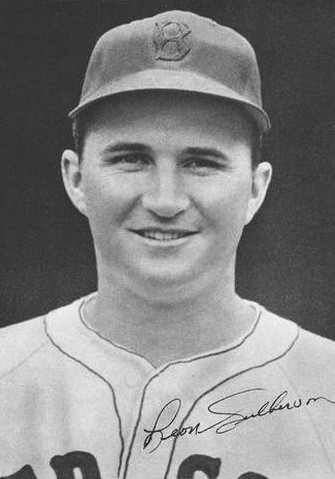
- Culberson in 1947
- Outfielder
- Born: August 6, 1919; Halls, Georgia, U.S.
- Died: September 17, 1989 (aged 70); Rome, Georgia, U.S.
- Batted: Right Threw: Right

MLB debut
- May 16, 1943, for the Boston Red Sox

Last MLB appearance
- May 12, 1948, for the Washington Senators

MLB statistics
- Batting average: .266
- Home runs: 14
- Runs batted in: 131
- Stats at Baseball Reference

Teams
- Boston Red Sox (1943–1947); Washington Senators (1948)

Delbert Leon Culberson (August 6, 1919 – September 17, 1989) was an American professional baseball player. He played as an outfielder in Major League Baseball (MLB) from 1943 to 1948 for the Boston Red Sox and the Washington Senators. Listed at 5 feet 11 inches (1.80 m) and 180 pounds (82 kg), he both batted and threw right-handed.

== Baseball career ==
Culberson's first year in professional baseball was 1940, when he played for the Kannapolis Towelers of the Class D North Carolina State League. He hit .307 with 14 home runs in 68 games, and was spotted by a Red Sox scout and acquired. In 1941, he played for the Scranton Red Sox of the Class A Eastern League, and hit .232 in 76 games. During the season, he had an emergency appendectomy, which led to six weeks in the hospital. In 1942, he again played for Scranton and raised his average to .286 while playing 120 games. In 1943, he moved up to the Louisville Colonels in Class AA. He struggled in his first 10 games, hitting just 7-for-41 (.171), but was called up to the major league club when they sent down another outfielder, Tom McBride.

=== Boston Red Sox ===
==== 1943–1945 ====
Culberson made his major league debut on May 16, 1943, against the Chicago White Sox. Baseball records for many years credited a career minor league pitcher, Al Olsen, as appearing in the first game of that day's doubleheader as a pinch hitter who walked and had a stolen base. Research later found that Olsen did not make any major league appearances, rendering him a phantom ballplayer. Culberson is now credited with the noted appearance in the first game of the doubleheader, although Culberson denied playing in the game. Culberson was the starting center fielder in the second game of the doubleheader, thus his debut date is not in question.

During the 1943 season, Culberson played in 81 games for Boston, hitting .272 and stealing 14 bases; third best on the team in each of those categories. On July 3, he hit for the cycle against the Cleveland Indians. Batting lead off, he hit a single in the 1st inning, a double in the 3rd inning, a triple in the 6th inning, and a home run (inside-the-park) in the 8th inning. By collecting the hits in that order it was a rare "natural" cycle, the fifth in MLB history. He remains the only player to ever have an inside-the-park home run as part of his cycle. In 1944, his average fell to .238 playing in 75 games, then in 1945 he raised his average to .275 while appearing in 97 games. He played through the war years due to a trick knee condition that rendered him unfit for military duty, and also sidelined him at times.

==== 1946 season ====
In 1946, Culberson hit .313 while appearing in 59 games for Boston. That year, the Red Sox ran away with the American League crown by twelve games over the Detroit Tigers with a 104–50 record, and were heavy favorites in the World Series against the St. Louis Cardinals, however the series went the full seven games.

In game seven, Culberson was involved in a famous play known as the "mad dash". After Red Sox center fielder Dom DiMaggio drove in two runs in the top of the eighth, the score was tied 3–3. DiMaggio pulled a hamstring during the play and was forced to leave the game; he was replaced by Culberson, who entered the game as a pinch runner and also took over for DiMaggio in centerfield. Enos Slaughter led off the bottom half of the inning with a single. After the next two batters failed to advance him, Slaughter found himself still on first base with two outs. With outfielder Harry Walker at the plate with a two balls and one strike count, the Cardinals called for a hit and run. With Slaughter running, Walker lined the ball to left-center field. Culberson fielded the ball, and threw a relay to shortstop Johnny Pesky. Slaughter rounded third base heading for home, running through the stop sign from his third base coach. What exactly happened when Pesky turned around is still a matter of contention, but catcher Roy Partee caught a delayed throw up the line, allowing Slaughter to score what proved to be the winning run. While "Pesky held the ball" became a catchphrase in Boston, a soft throw from Culberson (playing in place of the strong-armed DiMaggio) may have been more to blame.

Culberson finished the series batting two-for-nine with one RBI (a home run in game five) and one walk; it was the only postseason series of his career.

==== 1947 season ====
Culberson's final season with Boston was 1947, when he appeared in 47 games and his hitting again dropped to a .238 average. In the offseason he was traded to the Washington Senators.

=== Washington Senators ===
In 1948, Culberson played in just 12 games for the Senators, batting 5-for-29 (.172) before he was traded to the New York Yankees who designated him to Class AAA, playing for the Kansas City Blues. He would not return to the major leagues.

=== Late career ===
For the remainder of 1948 through 1952, Culberson played for a total of eight different teams, ranging from Class AAA to Class D. During 1951 and 1952, he also managed the teams he played for in Class D and Class B, compiling a .415 winning percentage.

== Personal life ==
Culberson died in Rome, Georgia, in September 1989, and is buried there in Oaknoll Memorial Gardens. While some baseball sites state that Leon Culberson was the grandfather of MLB player Charlie Culberson (born 1989), Charlie Culberson has stated that "he was actually my grandfather’s first cousin."

== See also ==
- List of Major League Baseball players to hit for the cycle

Achievements
Preceded by George McQuinn	Hitting for the cycle July 3, 1943	Succeeded by Bobby Doerr
