= Tex Hughson =

American baseball player (1916–1993)

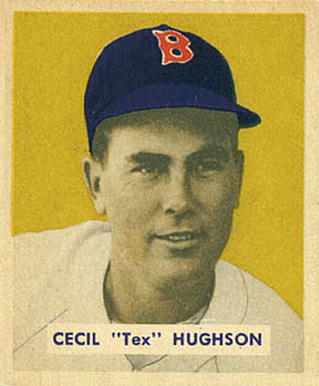
- Pitcher
- Born: February 9, 1916; Buda, Texas, U.S.
- Died: August 6, 1993 (aged 77); San Marcos, Texas, U.S.
- Batted: Right Threw: Right

MLB debut
- April 16, 1941, for the Boston Red Sox

Last MLB appearance
- October 2, 1949, for the Boston Red Sox

MLB statistics
- Win–loss record: 96–54
- Earned run average: 2.94
- Strikeouts: 693
- Stats at Baseball Reference

Teams
- Boston Red Sox (1941–1944, 1946–1949)

Career highlights and awards
- 3× All-Star (1942–1944); AL wins leader (1942); AL strikeout leader (1942); Boston Red Sox Hall of Fame

Cecil Carlton Hughson (February 9, 1916 – August 6, 1993) was an American Major League Baseball starting pitcher who played his entire career in the American League with the Boston Red Sox (1941–44, 1946–49). He batted and threw right-handed.

== Early life ==
A native of Buda, Texas, Hughson played collegiately at the University of Texas at Austin.

== Professional career ==
Hughson enjoyed his best season in 1942, posting a 22–6 record with a 2.59 ERA, and also leading the league in victories, strikeouts (113), complete games (22), innings pitched (281.0) and batters faced (1150). In 1943, he won 12 games with 114 strikeouts and a 2.64 ERA, and again led the league in complete games (20). He also had his best year batting, posting career highs in hits, runs, doubles, walks, batting average and RBI's. He led the league in winning percentage (18-5,.783) and WHIP (9.43), and also had a career-best ERA of 2.26.

After serving in the military in 1945, he won 20 games in 1946, led the league in walks per nine innings (1.65), set a career high in strikeouts with 172, and completed 21 of 35 starts. His several 1-0 shutouts led to an early pennant-clinching for the Red Sox. But he fell to 12 wins in 1947, and finished his career when at the age of 33 after two seasons in relief.

=== Career statistics ===
In an eight-year career, Hughson posted a 96–54 won-lost record with 693 strikeouts and a 2.94 ERA in 1375.2 innings. His control was good enough for an effective 1.86 strikeout-to-walk ratio (693-to-372). Hughson was an American League All-Star for three consecutive years (1942–44).

== Player profile ==
Hughson was a successful and competitive major league pitcher who was not averse to throwing close to batters, changing speeds by mixing a hard fastball with an overhand curveball. At the height of his career, arm and shoulder injuries threatened permanent disability and hastened his retirement.

== Legacy ==
Hughson was enshrined in the University of Texas Hall of Honor in 1970, the Texas Sports Hall of Fame in 1987, and the Boston Red Sox Hall of Fame in November 2002.

== Personal life ==
Hughson was one of the first in the United States to raise Charolais cattle. He served on the local school board of trustees in the 1950s, where he was one who led the effort to integrate the public schools. In the 1960s, Hughson developed part of his ranch into the Hughson Heights subdivision.

He died in San Marcos at age 77, and is buried in San Marcos Cemetery.

== See also ==
- List of Major League Baseball annual strikeout leaders
- List of Major League Baseball annual wins leaders
