= Rip Russell =

American baseball player (1915–1976)

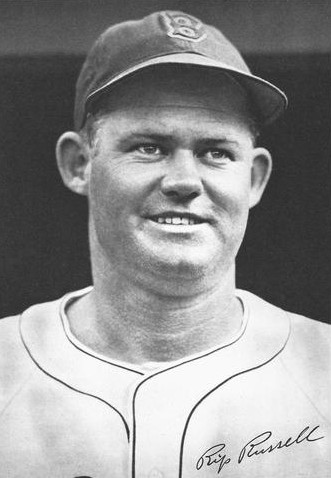
- Russell in 1947
- First baseman
- Born: January 26, 1915; Los Angeles, California, U.S.
- Died: September 26, 1976 (aged 61); Los Alamitos, California, U.S.
- Batted: Right Threw: Right

MLB debut
- May 5, 1939, for the Chicago Cubs

Last MLB appearance
- July 13, 1947, for the Boston Red Sox

MLB statistics
- Batting average: .245
- Home runs: 29
- Runs batted in: 192
- Stats at Baseball Reference

Teams
- Chicago Cubs (1939–1942); Boston Red Sox (1946–1947)

Glen David "Rip" Russell (January 26, 1915 – September 26, 1976) was an American infielder in Major League Baseball, playing mainly as a first baseman for two different teams between the 1939 and 1947 seasons. Listed at 6 feet 1 inch (1.85 m) tall and 180 pounds (82 kg), Russell batted and threw right-handed. He was born in Los Angeles, California.

Basically a line-drive hitter and a good fielding replacement, Russell entered the majors in 1939 with the Chicago Cubs, playing for them four years (1939–42) before joining the Boston Red Sox (1946–47). His most productive MLB season came during his rookie year, when he posted career-highs in batting average (.273), home runs (9), runs (55), hits (148), extra-base hits (38), RBI (79) and games played (143).

Russell was a member of the 1946 AL champion Red Sox, appearing in 80 games and making 64 starts at third base before losing his regular job to Pinky Higgins because of poor offensive production (.208 in 274 at bats). However, he was a perfect 2-for-2 in pinch hitting roles in the 1946 World Series. He started a Red Sox rally in the eighth inning of Game 7 with a lead-off single off Murry Dickson of the St. Louis Cardinals, then scored Boston's second run of the contest. The Bosox were able to tie the game at 3–3, but the Cardinals bounced back in their half of the eighth, scoring the Series-clinching run on Slaughter's Mad Dash.

In his six-season MLB career, Russell was a .245 hitter (344-for-1,402) with 29 home runs and 192 RBI in 425 games, including 133 runs, 52 doubles, eight triples and four stolen bases. He was a star of the top-level Pacific Coast League in the 1940s, appearing for four clubs and hitting over .300 five times.

Russell died in Los Alamitos, California, at the age of 61.
