= Dave Ferriss =

American baseball player (1921–2016)

Dave “Boo” Ferriss
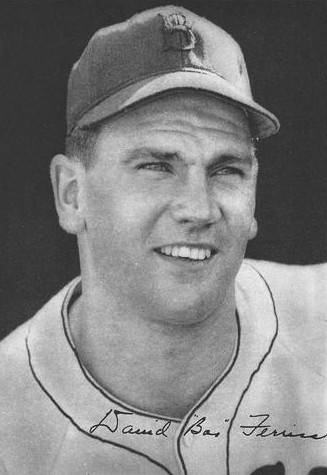
- Ferriss in 1947
- Pitcher
- Born: December 5, 1921; Shaw, Mississippi, U.S.
- Died: November 24, 2016 (aged 94); Cleveland, Mississippi, U.S.
- Batted: Left Threw: Right

MLB debut
- April 29, 1945, for the Boston Red Sox

Last MLB appearance
- April 18, 1950, for the Boston Red Sox

MLB statistics
- Win–loss record: 65–30
- Earned run average: 3.64
- Strikeouts: 296
- Stats at Baseball Reference

Teams
- Boston Red Sox (1945–1950)

Career highlights and awards
- 2× All-Star (1945, 1946); Boston Red Sox Hall of Fame

David Meadow Ferriss (December 5, 1921 – November 24, 2016) was an American Major League Baseball player who pitched for the Boston Red Sox from 1945 through 1950. Ferriss was given the nickname 'Boo' as the result of a childhood inability to pronounce the word 'brother'.

After Ferriss's MLB playing career was over, he returned to the Mississippi Delta for two stints as the head baseball coach at Delta State University where he retired as the school's all-time leader in wins with 639. In November 2002, he was inducted into the Boston Red Sox Hall of Fame.

== Playing career ==
=== College and minor league baseball ===
Ferriss received the first full baseball scholarship to Mississippi State University, where he pitched in 1941 and 1942 and joined the Kappa Sigma fraternity. He was signed by the Red Sox in 1942, and he appeared in 21 games for the Greensboro Red Sox of the Class B Piedmont League, compiling a 7–7 record. Shortly afterward, he was drafted into the Army for service in World War II, serving for over two years at Randolph Field in Texas, where he was able to continue playing baseball in a military league. After an early discharge in February 1945 due to asthma, Ferriss was assigned by the Red Sox to the Louisville Colonels.

=== Major League Baseball ===
When the Red Sox started slowly in 1945, Ferriss was called up and made a spectacular major league debut with a five-hit shutout against the Athletics on April 29. He went on to set a longstanding American League (AL) record for scoreless innings pitched at the start of a career with 22, which stood until 2008, when it was broken by Brad Ziegler. Ferriss compiled a 21–10 win–loss record for the Red Sox in his rookie season.

Ferriss then compiled a 25–6 record (the best in the AL) that helped the Red Sox win the AL pennant in 1946. He was selected for the All-Star Game that season for the first and only time but did not pitch, as the 1945 All-Star Game was not held due to wartime travel restrictions. He started two games in the 1946 World Series against the St. Louis Cardinals, and pitched a complete-game shutout in the third game before getting a no-decision in the seventh and deciding game, which was won by the Cardinals.

Ferriss' record in 1947 was 12–11. His arm troubles and asthma restricted him to only nine starts and 31 appearances in 1948, and four appearances in 1949. His final major league appearance was on Opening Day of the 1950 season, when he pitched only one inning. Ferriss compiled a career record of 65–30, and shares the MLB record for consecutive home wins to start a season (13, in 1946). He was inducted into the Boston Red Sox Hall of Fame in 2002.

Ferriss was a very good hitting pitcher in his six-year major league career, posting a .250 batting average (93-for-372) with one home run, 52 RBIs, and 44 runs scored. He had 19 RBIs in each of the 1945 and 1947 seasons. He finished his career with a .979 fielding percentage.

== Coaching career ==
Ferriss served as pitching coach for the Red Sox under manager Pinky Higgins from 1955 to 1959 before moving on to Delta State University as head coach in 1960. He held that role until early 1967, when he left Delta State to take the role of assistant athletic director at Mississippi State University. Ferriss returned to Delta State in mid-1968, and he again served as head coach from 1970 until retiring after the 1988 season. His 639–387–8 record as Delta State head coach ranks him among all-time national coaching leaders at the NCAA Division II level. He guided Delta State teams to the NCAA Division II playoffs in eight of his last twelve seasons, including three trips to the NCAA Division II Baseball Championship resulting in finishes of third (1977), second (1978), and third (1982). Gulf South Conference championships came in 1978, 1979, 1985, and 1988, along with a second-place finish in 1981 and third-place in 1982.

Ferriss spent 46 years in baseball at the collegiate and professional levels and was inducted into the American Baseball Coaches Association Hall of Fame in 1988. He was also inducted into the Mississippi Sports Hall of Fame, the Delta State University Sports Hall of Fame (1989), the Mississippi State University Sports Hall of Fame, and the Mississippi Semi-Pro Baseball Hall of Fame (1981). In 1988, he received the United States Baseball Federation Service Award for his contributions to the game. He was named NCAA Regional Coach of the Year three times, and earned similar Gulf South Conference coaching honors three times as well. In 1978 and 1982, he was elected College Baseball Coach of the Year in Mississippi, and was runner-up in 1985.

Under his direction, 20 Delta State players earned All-American honors, 20 earned Academic All-American honors, 49 earned All-Gulf South Conference honors, 23 continued their baseball careers onto the professional level, and 40 former players coached in the high school and college ranks. In addition to coaching at Delta State, Ferriss also served at various times as athletic director and director of the DSU Foundation.

In February 2008, Ferriss welcomed back author John Grisham to Delta State's campus for an athletic fundraiser. Grisham, a Mississippi native, began his career path "thanks to coach Ferriss" after Ferriss had cut Grisham from his team in the fall of 1978. In Grisham's "The Kindest Cut," the author details his time at Delta State and how coach Ferriss handled the difficult task of cutting the would-be outfielder. Also in 2008, Ferriss received an honorary Doctor of Public Service degree from Delta State.

=== Namings ===
- The baseball field at Delta State University is named Ferriss Field in his honor.
- The "Boo" Ferriss Baseball Museum – located at the Robert L. Crawford Center at Delta State University – was named after him.

== Ferriss Trophy ==
In the fall of 2003, the Mississippi Sports Hall of Fame announced its sponsorship of an annual Mississippi Collegiate Baseball Player of the Year award, and that the trophy would bear Ferriss' name and likeness. The award is officially called the C Spire Ferriss Trophy, including the name of corporate cosponsor C Spire Wireless.

== Personal life ==
Ferriss lived with his wife, Miriam Izard Ferriss, in Cleveland, Mississippi. They had two children, Dr. David Ferriss and Margaret Ferriss White, and two grandchildren. He was a member of Covenant Presbyterian Church (PCA) in Cleveland. He died on November 24, 2016, in Cleveland.

Preceded by Joe Dobson	Boston Red Sox Pitching Coach; 1955–1959	Succeeded by Sal Maglie
