= 1946 Major League Baseball season =

1946 MLB season
- League: American League (AL); National League (NL)
- Sport: Baseball
- Duration: Regular season: April 16 – September 29, 1946 (AL); April 16 – October 3, 1946 (NL); World Series: October 6–15, 1946
- Games: 154
- Teams: 16 (8 per league)

Regular season
- Season MVP: AL: Ted Williams (BOS); NL: Stan Musial (STL)
- AL champions: Boston Red Sox
- AL runners-up: Detroit Tigers
- NL champions: St. Louis Cardinals
- NL runners-up: Brooklyn Dodgers

World Series
- Champions: St. Louis Cardinals
- Runners-up: Boston Red Sox

MLB seasons
- ← 1945 1947 →

Locations of teams for the 1942–1953 American League seasons
American League
Locations of teams for the 1943–1952 National League seasons
National League

The 1946 major league baseball season began on April 16, 1946. The regular season ended on October 3, with the St. Louis Cardinals and Boston Red Sox as the regular season champions of the National League and American League, respectively. The Cardinals defeated the Brooklyn Dodgers in a regular season best-of-three tiebreaker, for the National League title, after both teams finished their 154-game schedules with identical 96–58 records. It was Major League Baseball's first-ever regular season tie-breaker. The postseason began with Game 1 of the 43rd World Series on October 6 and ended with Game 7 on October 15. The Cardinals defeated the Red Sox, four games to three, capturing their sixth championship in franchise history, since their previous in 1944. Going into the season, the defending World Series champions were the Detroit Tigers from the 1945 season.

The 13th All-Star Game was held on July 9 at Fenway Park in Boston, Massachusetts, hosted by the Boston Red Sox. The American League won, 12–0.

Many notable ballplayers returned from their military service this season, following the end of World War II, such as Joe DiMaggio, Stan Musial, and Ted Williams.

This was the first season in which the minor-league baseball color line broke. With the support from then-incoming commissioner Happy Chandler, Brooklyn Dodgers general manager Branch Rickey signed Jackie Robinson in late-October 1945 to their top minor-league affiliate, the Montreal Royals. Robinson would play for the Royals for the 1946 season.

This was the last National and American League seasons to be played under the color barrier, as in the following season, Jackie Robinson would make his debut with the NL's Brooklyn Dodgers to start and Larry Doby would make his debut with the AL's Cleveland Indians in July.

== Schedule ==
The 1946 schedule consisted of 154 games for all teams in the American League and National League, each of which had eight teams. Each team was scheduled to play 22 games against the other seven teams of their respective league. This continued the format put in place since the 1904 season (except for 1919) and would be used until 1961 in the American League and 1962 in the National League.

Opening Day took place on April 16, featuring all sixteen teams, continuing the trend from the previous season. The final day of the scheduled regular season was on September 29, which saw all sixteen teams play, the first time since 1944. Due to the Brooklyn Dodgers and St. Louis Cardinals finishing with the same record of 96–58, a best-of-three tie-breaker was scheduled, to be considered an extension of the regular season. The Cardinals swept the series in two games, on October 1 & 3. The World Series took place between October 6 and October 15.

== Rule changes ==
The 1946 season saw the following rule changes:

- Rules for unlimited night games for all teams (excluding holidays and Sundays) were confirmed to be permanent by commissioner Happy Chandler.
- Twilight-night doubleheaders were banned unless caused by postponements.
- The National League rule which permitted a 30-man roster until June 15 was expanded to the American League. Previously, the AL's rules permitted expanding the roster until 31 days after the commencement of the season.
- High-school players were prohibited from being signed by any major- or minor-league teams, until they were out of school for more than one year.
- As commissioner, Chandler did not retain the right to veto league rules that he believed were detrimental to baseball, as his predecessor, Kenesaw Mountain Landis did, though the major leagues acknowledged that the commissioner had the authority to determine when a rule or act was harmful to baseball and to block the implementation of such a rule.
- The Triple-A level was created as the new highest level of minor-league baseball, with the elevation of the American Association, International League, and Pacific Coast League, from Double-A.
- Restrictions were implemented on giving out large signing bonuses. If a player was signed for an annual salary and a bonus exceeding $6,000 (equivalent to $99,100 in 2025), the signing team could not send him to the minor leagues unless no other team claimed him on waivers. Moreover, if he was claimed by another team, his team could not withdraw the waivers. And if the "bonus baby" did end up going to the minors after all teams passed on him, he would be subject to the annual player draft. Any team violating the rule would lose the player, be unable to re-sign him for three years, and be fined $2,000 (equivalent to $33,000 in 2025). In addition, the individual transgressor for the team would be fined $500 (equivalent to $8,300 in 2025).

== Teams ==
An asterisk (*) denotes the ballpark a team played the minority of their home games at

League	Team	City	Ballpark	Capacity	Manager
American League	Boston Red Sox	Boston, Massachusetts	Fenway Park	33,817	Joe Cronin
American League	Chicago White Sox	Chicago, Illinois	Comiskey Park	50,000	Jimmy Dykes
American League	Chicago White Sox	Chicago, Illinois	Comiskey Park	50,000	Ted Lyons
American League	Cleveland Indians	Cleveland, Ohio	Cleveland Stadium	78,811	Lou Boudreau
American League	Cleveland Indians	Cleveland, Ohio	League Park*	22,500*	Lou Boudreau
American League	Detroit Tigers	Detroit, Michigan	Briggs Stadium	58,000	Steve O'Neill
American League	New York Yankees	New York, New York	Yankee Stadium	70,000	Joe McCarthy
American League	New York Yankees	New York, New York	Yankee Stadium	70,000	Bill Dickey
American League	New York Yankees	New York, New York	Yankee Stadium	70,000	Johnny Neun
American League	Philadelphia Athletics	Philadelphia, Pennsylvania	Shibe Park	33,000	Connie Mack
American League	St. Louis Browns	St. Louis, Missouri	Sportsman's Park	34,023	Luke Sewell
American League	St. Louis Browns	St. Louis, Missouri	Sportsman's Park	34,023	Zack Taylor
American League	Washington Senators	Washington, D.C.	Griffith Stadium	32,000	Ossie Bluege
National League	Boston Braves	Boston, Massachusetts	Braves Field	37,746	Billy Southworth
National League	Brooklyn Dodgers	New York, New York	Ebbets Field	34,219	Leo Durocher
National League	Chicago Cubs	Chicago, Illinois	Wrigley Field	38,396	Charlie Grimm
National League	Cincinnati Reds	Cincinnati, Ohio	Crosley Field	29,401	Bill McKechnie
National League	Cincinnati Reds	Cincinnati, Ohio	Crosley Field	29,401	Hank Gowdy
National League	New York Giants	New York, New York	Polo Grounds	56,000	Mel Ott
National League	Philadelphia Phillies	Philadelphia, Pennsylvania	Shibe Park	33,000	Ben Chapman
National League	Pittsburgh Pirates	Pittsburgh, Pennsylvania	Forbes Field	33,467	Frankie Frisch
National League	Pittsburgh Pirates	Pittsburgh, Pennsylvania	Forbes Field	33,467	Spud Davis
National League	St. Louis Cardinals	St. Louis, Missouri	Sportsman's Park	34,023	Eddie Dyer

== Standings ==
=== American League ===
American League
Team	W	L	Pct.	GB	Home	Road
Boston Red Sox	104	50	.675	—	61‍–‍16	43‍–‍34
Detroit Tigers	92	62	.597	12	48‍–‍30	44‍–‍32
New York Yankees	87	67	.565	17	47‍–‍30	40‍–‍37
Washington Senators	76	78	.494	28	38‍–‍38	38‍–‍40
Chicago White Sox	74	80	.481	30	40‍–‍38	34‍–‍42
Cleveland Indians	68	86	.442	36	36‍–‍41	32‍–‍45
St. Louis Browns	66	88	.429	38	35‍–‍41	31‍–‍47
Philadelphia Athletics	49	105	.318	55	31‍–‍46	18‍–‍59

=== National League ===
National League
Team	W	L	Pct.	GB	Home	Road
St. Louis Cardinals	98	58	.628	—	49‍–‍29	49‍–‍29
Brooklyn Dodgers	96	60	.615	2	56‍–‍22	40‍–‍38
Chicago Cubs	82	71	.536	14½	44‍–‍33	38‍–‍38
Boston Braves	81	72	.529	15½	45‍–‍31	36‍–‍41
Philadelphia Phillies	69	85	.448	28	41‍–‍36	28‍–‍49
Cincinnati Reds	67	87	.435	30	35‍–‍42	32‍–‍45
Pittsburgh Pirates	63	91	.409	34	37‍–‍40	26‍–‍51
New York Giants	61	93	.396	36	38‍–‍39	23‍–‍54

- The St. Louis Cardinals defeated the Brooklyn Dodgers in best-of-three playoff series to earn the National League pennant.

=== Tie games ===
9 tie games (5 in AL, 4 in NL), which are not factored into winning percentage or games behind (and were often replayed again) occurred throughout the season.

==== American League ====
- Boston Red Sox, 2
- Chicago White Sox, 1
- Cleveland Indians, 2
- Detroit Tigers, 1
- Philadelphia Athletics, 1
- St. Louis Browns, 2
- Washington Senators, 1

==== National League ====
- Boston Braves, 1
- Brooklyn Dodgers, 1
- Chicago Cubs, 2
- Cincinnati Reds, 2
- Philadelphia Phillies, 1
- Pittsburgh Pirates, 1

== Postseason ==
The postseason began on October 1 and ended on October 15 with the St. Louis Cardinals defeating the Boston Red Sox in the 1946 World Series in seven games.

=== Bracket ===
National League playoff			World Series
			AL	Boston Red Sox	3
NL	STL Cardinals	2	NL	STL Cardinals	4
NL	Brooklyn	0

== Managerial changes ==
=== Off-season ===
Team	Former Manager	New Manager
Boston Braves	Del Bissonette	Billy Southworth
St. Louis Cardinals	Billy Southworth	Eddie Dyer

=== In-season ===
Team	Former Manager	New Manager
Chicago White Sox	Jimmy Dykes	Ted Lyons
Cincinnati Reds	Bill McKechnie	Hank Gowdy
New York Yankees	Joe McCarthy	Bill Dickey
New York Yankees	Bill Dickey	Johnny Neun
Pittsburgh Pirates	Frankie Frisch	Spud Davis
St. Louis Browns	Luke Sewell	Zack Taylor

== League leaders ==
=== American League ===
Hitting leaders
Stat	Player	Total
AVG	Mickey Vernon (WSH)	.353
OPS	Ted Williams (BOS)	1.164
HR	Hank Greenberg (DET)	44
RBI	Hank Greenberg (DET)	127
R	Ted Williams (BOS)	142
H	Johnny Pesky (BOS)	208
SB	George Case (CLE)	28

Pitching leaders
Stat	Player	Total
W	Bob Feller (CLE); Hal Newhouser (DET)	26
L	Dick Fowler (PHA); Lou Knerr (PHA); Phil Marchildon (PHA)	16
ERA	Hal Newhouser (DET)	1.94
K	Bob Feller (CLE)	348
IP	Bob Feller (CLE)	371.1
SV	Bob Klinger (BOS)	9
WHIP	Hal Newhouser (DET)	1.069

=== National League ===
Hitting leaders
Stat	Player	Total
AVG	Stan Musial (STL)	.365
OPS	Stan Musial (STL)	1.021
HR	Ralph Kiner (PIT)	23
RBI	Enos Slaughter (STL)	130
R	Stan Musial (STL)	124
H	Stan Musial (STL)	228
SB	Pete Reiser (BRO)	34

Pitching leaders
Stat	Player	Total
W	Howie Pollet (STL)	21
L	Dave Koslo (NYG)	19
ERA	Howie Pollet (STL)	2.10
K	Johnny Schmitz (CHC)	135
IP	Howie Pollet (STL)	266.0
SV	Ken Raffensberger (PHI)	6
WHIP	Mort Cooper (BSN)	1.106

== Milestones ==
=== Batters ===
==== Cycles ====
- Mickey Vernon (WSH):
  - Vernon hit for his first cycle and fourth in franchise history, in game two of a doubleheader on May 19 against the Chicago White Sox.
- Ted Williams (BOS):
  - Williams hit for his first cycle and 11th in franchise history, in game two of a doubleheader on July 21 against the St. Louis Browns.

==== Other batting accomplishments ====
- Rudy York (BOS):
  - Became the third player to hit two grand slams in a single game, in a 13–6 win over the St. Louis Browns on July 27.
  - Became the fifth player to hit at least 10 runs batted in (RBI) in a single game, hitting 10 against the St. Louis Browns on July 27.

=== Pitchers ===
==== No-hitters ====
- Ed Head (BRO):
  - Head threw his first career no-hitter and the ninth no-hitter in franchise history, by defeating the Boston Braves 5–0 on April 23. Head walked three and struck out two.
- Bob Feller (CLE):
  - Feller therw his second career no-hitter and the seventh no-hitter in franchise history, by defeating the New York Yankees 1–0 on April 30. Feller walked five and struck out 11.

== Awards and honors ==
=== Regular season ===
Baseball Writers' Association of America Awards
BBWAA Award	National League	American League
Most Valuable Player	Stan Musial (STL)	Ted Williams (BSN)

=== Other awards ===
The Sporting News Awards
Award	National League	American League
Player of the Year	Stan Musial (STL)	—
Rookie of the Year	Del Ennis (PHI)	—
Manager of the Year	Eddie Dyer (STL)	—
Executive of the Year	—	Tom Yawkey (BSN)

=== Baseball Hall of Fame ===
- Jesse Burkett
- Frank Chance
- Jack Chesbro
- Johnny Evers
- Tommy McCarthy
- Joe McGinnity
- Eddie Plank
- Joe Tinker
- Rube Waddell
- Ed Walsh
- Clark Griffith (executive/pioneer contributor)

== Home field attendance ==
Team name	Wins	%±	Home attendance	%±	Per game
New York Yankees	87	7.4%	2,265,512	156.9%	29,422
Brooklyn Dodgers	96	10.3%	1,796,824	69.6%	22,745
Detroit Tigers	92	4.5%	1,722,590	34.5%	21,805
Boston Red Sox	104	46.5%	1,416,944	134.7%	18,166
Chicago Cubs	82	−16.3%	1,342,970	29.6%	17,441
New York Giants	61	−21.8%	1,219,873	20.0%	15,843
St. Louis Cardinals	98	3.2%	1,061,807	78.6%	13,613
Cleveland Indians	68	−6.8%	1,057,289	89.4%	13,731
Philadelphia Phillies	69	50.0%	1,045,247	266.7%	13,401
Washington Senators	76	−12.6%	1,027,216	57.4%	13,516
Chicago White Sox	74	4.2%	983,403	49.5%	12,448
Boston Braves	81	20.9%	969,673	159.1%	12,593
Pittsburgh Pirates	63	−23.2%	749,962	24.0%	9,615
Cincinnati Reds	67	9.8%	715,751	146.8%	9,295
Philadelphia Athletics	49	−5.8%	621,793	34.4%	7,972
St. Louis Browns	66	−18.5%	526,435	9.0%	6,837

== Venues ==
The Cleveland Indians would play their last game at League Park on September 21 against the Detroit Tigers, permanently moving into Cleveland Stadium for the start of the 1947 season. Over 77 home games, the Indians played 41 games at Cleveland Stadium and 36 games at League Park. All Sunday home games took place at Cleveland Stadium. This would be the last of 12 seasons since 1932 that saw the Indians play at both venues.

== See also ==
- 1946 in baseball (Events, Births, Deaths)
- 1946 All-American Girls Professional Baseball League season
- 1946 Japanese Baseball League season
