= Bob Savage =

American baseball player (1921-2013)

- Pitcher
- Born: December 1, 1921; Manchester, New Hampshire, U.S.
- Died: July 26, 2013 (aged 91); Berlin, New Hampshire, U.S.
- Batted: Right Threw: Right

MLB debut
- June 24, 1942, for the Philadelphia Athletics

Last MLB appearance
- May 4, 1949, for the St. Louis Browns

MLB statistics
- Win–loss record: 16–27
- Earned run average: 4.32
- Strikeouts: 171
- Stats at Baseball Reference

Teams
- Philadelphia Athletics (1942, 1946–1948); St. Louis Browns (1949)

John Robert Savage (December 1, 1921 – July 26, 2013) was an American professional baseball pitcher. He played for the Philadelphia Athletics and St. Louis Browns of Major League Baseball (MLB) in parts of five seasons spanning 1942–1949. Listed at 6 feet 2 inches (1.88 m) and 180 pounds (82 kg), he batted and threw right-handed.

== Biography ==
Savage was born in 1921 in Manchester, New Hampshire. He originally signed with the Philadelphia Athletics in 1942, making his major league debut on June 24. Like many other players of the era, his career was interrupted by World War II. He served in the United States Army with the 3rd Infantry Regiment, where he received three Purple Heart awards.

Following his discharge from military service, Savage returned to the Athletics in 1946, pitching for them during three seasons before joining the St. Louis Browns in 1949, his last major league season. He then continued to pitch in the minor leagues until 1953.

After retiring from baseball, Savage worked for Wilson Sporting Goods before opening his own sporting goods store. He also taught physical education at Gorham High School in New Hampshire. He also went into politics, serving two terms as Clerk of the Probate Court of Coös County, New Hampshire, retiring in 1986. Savage died in Berlin, New Hampshire, in 2013 at the age of 91.
