= Phil Marchildon =

Canadian baseball player (1913–1997)

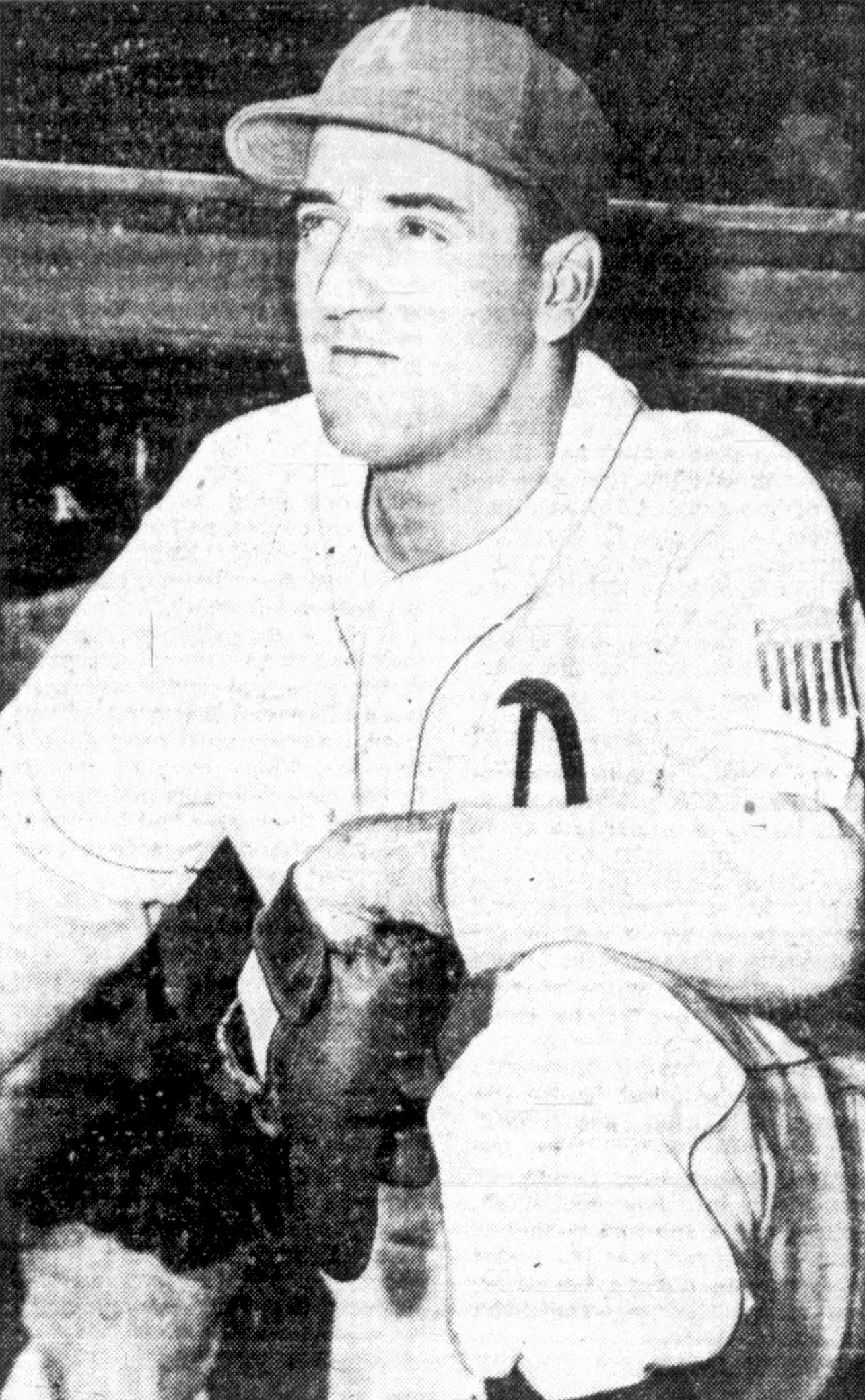
- Marchildon, circa 1945
- Pitcher
- Born: October 25, 1913; Penetanguishene, Ontario, Canada
- Died: January 10, 1997 (aged 83); Toronto, Ontario, Canada
- Batted: Right Threw: Right

MLB debut
- September 22, 1940, for the Philadelphia Athletics

Last MLB appearance
- July 16, 1950, for the Boston Red Sox

MLB statistics
- Win–loss record: 68–75
- Earned run average: 3.93
- Strikeouts: 481
- Stats at Baseball Reference

Teams
- Philadelphia Athletics (1940–1942, 1945–1949); Boston Red Sox (1950)

Member of the Canadian

Baseball Hall of Fame
- Induction: 1983

Philip Joseph "Babe" Marchildon (October 25, 1913 – January 10, 1997) was a Canadian professional baseball player. A right-handed pitcher, he played in Major League Baseball (MLB) for the Philadelphia Athletics and Boston Red Sox between 1940 and 1950. Listed at 5 feet 10 inches (1.78 m) and 175 pounds (79 kg), he was inducted to the Canadian Baseball Hall of Fame in 1983.

== Baseball career ==
Marchildon pitched 1,2141/3 innings with a won-lost record of 68 wins and 75 losses and a career earned run average (ERA) of 3.93 for the Philadelphia Athletics and the Boston Red Sox from 1940 to 1942 and from 1945 to 1950.

All but one of his 185 major-league games pitched came in an A's uniform. Marchildon had two standout seasons for Philadelphia, going 17–14 with a 4.20 ERA for the 1942 Athletics and 19–9 with a 3.22 ERA for the 1947 Athletics. His 17 victories in 1942 accounting for nearly one-third of the team's season total of 55 wins; the A's finished eighth and last in the American League that year. He led the league in bases on balls and placed ninth in Most Valuable Player Award balloting in both 1942 and 1947.

Marchildon was named to Canada's Sports Hall of Fame in 1976, the Canadian Baseball Hall of Fame its initial year, 1983, and the sports hall of fame in Penetanguishene, his hometown, in 1987. He was inducted into the Ontario Sports Hall of Fame in 1996.

== Personal life ==
During World War II, Marchildon served in the Royal Canadian Air Force as a tail gunner in a Halifax bomber and was later a prisoner of war at the infamous Stalag Luft III in Germany for the final nine months of the war. Marchildon died in Toronto on January 10, 1997, at age 83 of cancer.
