= Tom McBride (baseball) =

American baseball player (1914–2001)

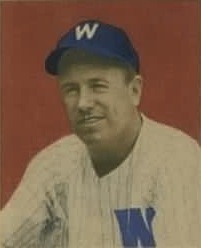
- McBride's 1949 Bowman Gum baseball card
- Outfielder
- Born: November 2, 1914; Bonham, Texas, U.S.
- Died: December 26, 2001 (aged 87); Wichita Falls, Texas, U.S.
- Batted: Right Threw: Right

MLB debut
- April 23, 1943, for the Boston Red Sox

Last MLB appearance
- September 30, 1948, for the Washington Senators

MLB statistics
- Batting average: .275
- Home runs: 2
- Runs batted in: 141
- Stats at Baseball Reference

Teams
- Boston Red Sox (1943–1947); Washington Senators (1947–1948)

Thomas Raymond McBride (November 2, 1914 – December 26, 2001) was an American professional baseball outfielder. He played all or part of six seasons in Major League Baseball for the Boston Red Sox (1943–47) and Washington Senators (1947–48). He also played extensively in minor league baseball. His professional career spanned sixteen seasons, from 1936 until 1951.

== Boston Red Sox ==
McBride's busiest and best major league season was 1945 when he appeared in 100 games for Boston and made 374 plate appearances. He hit .305 (105-for-344) with 1 home run, 47 runs batted in, and 38 runs scored. Also that season he tied a major league record with 6 RBI in the 4th inning on August 4 (game 2). In that game against the Washington Senators he hit a bases-loaded double and a bases-loaded triple. McBride's 7 triples that season tied him for eighth in the American League.

He played an important role on the pennant-winning Red Sox team of 1946, hitting .301 in 61 games and making no errors in 43 outfield appearances. In five World Series games he was 2-for-12 with one RBI. Coincidentally, McBride made both the first and final outs of the 1946 World Series.

== Washington Senators ==
On May 14, 1947, McBride was purchased by the Washington Senators from the Red Sox. In two seasons with Washington he hit a combined .263 and continued to play good defense. On July 2, 1948, he set the major league record of 12 putouts in left field in an extra-inning game. His last major league appearance was on September 30, 1948.

== Career overview ==
In a total of 408 games he was 326-for-1186 (.275), and 93 walks and one hit by pitch pushed his on-base percentage up to .328. He had 2 HR, 141 RBI, scored 140 runs, and had a slugging percentage of .340. In 312 outfield appearances and 16 appearances at first base he handled 815 out of 826 chances successfully for a .987 fielding percentage.
