= Dick Fowler (baseball) =

Canadian baseball player (1921-1972)

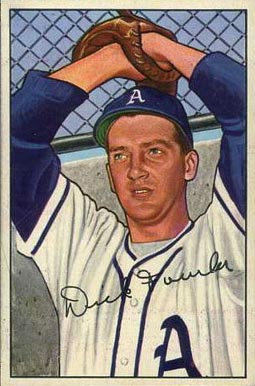
- Pitcher
- Born: March 30, 1921; Toronto, Ontario, Canada
- Died: May 22, 1972 (aged 51); Oneonta, New York, U.S.
- Batted: Right Threw: Right

MLB debut
- September 13, 1941, for the Philadelphia Athletics

Last MLB appearance
- September 1, 1952, for the Philadelphia Athletics

MLB statistics
- Win–loss record: 66–79
- Earned run average: 4.11
- Strikeouts: 382
- Stats at Baseball Reference

Teams
- Philadelphia Athletics (1941–1942, 1945–1952)

Career highlights and awards
- Pitched a no-hitter on September 9, 1945

Member of the Canadian

Baseball Hall of Fame
- Induction: 1985

Richard John Fowler (March 30, 1921 – May 22, 1972) was a Canadian professional baseball player. Born in Toronto, Fowler was a starting pitcher in Major League Baseball who appeared in 221 total games pitched—170 of them starts (77 percent)—for the Philadelphia Athletics (1941–1942 and 1945–1952). He batted and threw right-handed was listed as 6 feet 4 inches (1.93 m) tall and 215 pounds (98 kg) (15 stone, 5 pounds).

== Career ==
In his ten-season career, Fowler posted a 66–79 record with 11 shutouts, 75 complete games, 382 strikeouts, and a 4.11 ERA in 1,303 innings pitched, allowing 1,367 hits and 578 bases on balls. He pitched over 200 innings each year from 1946 to 1949, and pitched all 16 innings of a 1–0 loss to the St. Louis Browns in 1942.

During World War II, Fowler served with the 48th Highlanders of Canada regiment in the Canadian Army, whose members wear kilts as part of their ceremonial dress. He became a naturalized citizens of the United States in May 1949.

Fowler threw a nine-inning, 1–0 no-hitter against the St. Louis Browns at Shibe Park on September 9, 1945, in his first start in three years and his first major league shutout. Fowler allowed four bases on balls and faced 29 batters, two over the minimum. He was aided by two double plays.

Fowler died from kidney and liver ailments at the age of 51 in Oneonta, New York, on May 22, 1972.

Fowler was posthumously named to the Canadian Baseball Hall of Fame in the Class of 1985.

== See also ==
- List of Major League Baseball players from Canada
- List of Major League Baseball no-hitters
- List of Major League Baseball players who spent their entire career with one franchise

Achievements
Preceded by Clyde Shoun	No-hitter pitcher September 9, 1945	Succeeded by Ed Head
