= 1944 Cleveland Indians season =

1944 Cleveland Indians
- League: American League
- Ballpark: League Park; Cleveland Municipal Stadium
- City: Cleveland, Ohio
- Owners: Alva Bradley
- General managers: Roger Peckinpaugh
- Managers: Lou Boudreau
- Radio: WCLE · WHK (Jack Graney, Lew Henry)

The 1944 Cleveland Indians season was a season in American major league baseball. The team finished fifth in the American League with a record of 72–82–1.

== Regular season ==
=== Season standings ===
American League
Team	W	L	Pct.	GB	Home	Road
St. Louis Browns	89	65	.578	—	54‍–‍23	35‍–‍42
Detroit Tigers	88	66	.571	1	43‍–‍34	45‍–‍32
New York Yankees	83	71	.539	6	47‍–‍31	36‍–‍40
Boston Red Sox	77	77	.500	12	47‍–‍30	30‍–‍47
Cleveland Indians	72	82	.468	17	39‍–‍38	33‍–‍44
Philadelphia Athletics	72	82	.468	17	39‍–‍37	33‍–‍45
Chicago White Sox	71	83	.461	18	41‍–‍36	30‍–‍47
Washington Senators	64	90	.416	25	40‍–‍37	24‍–‍53

=== Record vs. opponents ===
1944 American League record Sources:
Team	BOS	CWS	CLE	DET	NYY	PHA	SLB	WSH
Boston	—	17–5	8–14	10–12–2	11–11	11–11	10–12	10–12
Chicago	5–17	—	14–8	9–13	10–12	9–13	8–14	16–6
Cleveland	14–8	8–14	—	10–12	8–14	12–10–1	10–12	10–12
Detroit	12–10–2	13–9	12–10	—	14–8	11–11	9–13	17–5
New York	11–11	12–10	14–8	8–14	—	13–9	10–12	15–7
Philadelphia	11–11	13–9	10–12–1	11–11	9–13	—	9–13	9–13
St. Louis	12–10	14–8	12–10	13–9	12–10	13–9	—	13–9
Washington	12–10	6–16	12–10	5–17	7–15	13–9	9–13	—

=== Roster ===
1944 Cleveland Indians
Roster
Pitchers: 22 Jim Bagby; 30 Bill Bonness; 33 Paul Calvert; 30 Red Embree; 25 Steve Gromek; 18 Mel Harder; 34 Earl Henry; 11 Joe Heving; 12 Vern Kennedy; 15 Hal Kleine; 39 Ed Klieman; 31 Mike Naymick; 35 Ray Poat; 21 Allie Reynolds; 32 Al Smith	Catchers: 4 Jim Devlin; 38 Russ Lyon; 29 Jim McDonnell; 2 Buddy Rosar; 16 Hank Ruszkowski; 4 Norm Schlueter; 28 George Susce; Infielders: 37 Steve Biras; 5 Lou Boudreau; 36 Jimmy Grant; 8 Ken Keltner; 38 Ray Mack; 3 Rusty Peters; 9 Mickey Rocco	Outfielders: 1 Roy Cullenbine; 24 Jeff Heath; 17 Myril Hoag; 34 Oris Hockett; 6 Paul O'Dea; 23 Pat Seerey	Manager: 5 Lou Boudreau; Coaches: 27 Del Baker; 26 Burt Shotton; 28 George Susce

== Player stats ==
=== Batting ===
==== Starters by position ====
Note: Pos = Position; G = Games played; AB = At bats; H = Hits; Avg. = Batting average; HR = Home runs; RBI = Runs batted in

Pos	Player	G	AB	H	Avg.	HR	RBI
C	Buddy Rosar	99	331	87	.263	0	30
1B	Mickey Rocco	155	653	174	.266	13	70
2B	Ray Mack	83	284	66	.232	0	29
SS	Lou Boudreau	150	584	191	.327	3	67
3B	Ken Keltner	149	573	169	.295	13	91
OF	Oris Hockett	124	457	132	.289	1	50
OF	Pat Seerey	101	342	80	.234	15	39
OF	Roy Cullenbine	154	571	162	.284	16	80

==== Other batters ====
Note: G = Games played; AB = At bats; H = Hits; Avg. = Batting average; HR = Home runs; RBI = Runs batted in

Player	G	AB	H	Avg.	HR	RBI
Rusty Peters	88	282	63	.223	1	24
Myril Hoag	67	277	79	.285	1	27
Paul O'Dea	76	173	55	.318	0	13
Jeff Heath	60	151	50	.331	5	33
Norm Schlueter	49	122	15	.123	0	11
Jimmy Grant	61	99	27	.273	1	12
George Susce	29	61	14	.230	0	4
Jim McDonnell	20	43	10	.233	0	4
Russ Lyon	7	11	2	.182	0	0
Hank Ruszkowski	3	8	3	.375	0	1
Steve Biras	2	2	2	1.000	0	2
Jim Devlin	1	1	0	.000	0	0

=== Pitching ===
Starting pitchers

Note: G = Games pitched; IP = Innings pitched; W = Wins; L = Losses; ERA = Earned run average; SO = Strikeouts

Player	G	IP	W	L	ERA	SO
Steve Gromek	35	203.2	10	9	2.56	115
Mel Harder	30	196.1	12	10	3.71	64
Al Smith	28	181.2	7	13	3.42	44
Allie Reynolds	28	158.0	11	8	3.30	84
Jim Bagby	13	79.0	4	5	4.33	12
Vern Kennedy	12	59.0	2	5	5.03	17

==== Other pitchers ====
Note: G = Games pitched; IP = Innings pitched; W = Wins; L = Losses; ERA = Earned run average; SO = Strikeouts

Player	G	IP	W	L	ERA	SO
Earl Henry	2	17.2	1	1	4.58	5
Mike Naymick	7	13.0	0	0	9.69	4
Bill Bonness	2	7.0	0	1	7.71	1
Paul O'Dea	3	4.1	0	0	2.08	0
Red Embree	3	3.1	0	1	13.50	4

==== Relief pitchers ====
Note: G = Games pitched; W = Wins; L = Losses; SV = Saves; ERA = Earned run average; SO = Strikeouts

Player	G	W	L	SV	ERA	SO
Joe Heving	63	8	3	10	1.96	46
Ed Klieman	47	11	13	5	3.38	44
Ray Poat	36	4	8	1	5.13	40
Paul Calvert	35	1	3	0	4.56	31
Hal Kleine	11	1	2	0	5.75	13

== Awards and honors ==
All-Star Game

Lou Boudreau, Shortstop

Roy Cullenbine, Outfielder

Oris Hockett, Outfielder

Ken Keltner, Third baseman (starter)

== Farm system ==
Level	Team	League	Manager
AA	Baltimore Orioles	International League	Alphonse "Tommy" Thomas
A	Wilkes-Barre Barons	Eastern League	Jack Sanford
D	Batavia Clippers	PONY League	Jack Tighe

LEAGUE CHAMPIONS: Baltimore
