= 1945 Cleveland Indians season =

1945 Cleveland Indians
- League: American League
- Ballpark: League Park; Cleveland Municipal Stadium
- City: Cleveland, Ohio
- Owners: Alva Bradley
- General managers: Roger Peckinpaugh
- Managers: Lou Boudreau

The 1945 Cleveland Indians season was a season in American major league baseball. The team finished fifth in the American League with a record of 73–72–2.

== Regular season ==
=== Season standings ===
American League
Team	W	L	Pct.	GB	Home	Road
Detroit Tigers	88	65	.575	—	50‍–‍26	38‍–‍39
Washington Senators	87	67	.565	1½	46‍–‍31	41‍–‍36
St. Louis Browns	81	70	.536	6	47‍–‍27	34‍–‍43
New York Yankees	81	71	.533	6½	48‍–‍28	33‍–‍43
Cleveland Indians	73	72	.503	11	44‍–‍33	29‍–‍39
Chicago White Sox	71	78	.477	15	44‍–‍29	27‍–‍49
Boston Red Sox	71	83	.461	17½	42‍–‍35	29‍–‍48
Philadelphia Athletics	52	98	.347	34½	39‍–‍35	13‍–‍63

=== Record vs. opponents ===
1945 American League record Sources:
Team	BOS	CWS	CLE	DET	NYY	PHA	SLB	WSH
Boston	—	9–13	11–11	12–10–1	6–16	14–8	8–14–1	11–11–1
Chicago	13–9	—	11–8–1	10–12	9–12	12–10	8–13	8–14
Cleveland	11–11	8–11–1	—	11–11	12–9	12–6–1	11–10	8–14
Detroit	10–12–1	12–10	11–11	—	15–7	15–7–1	15–6	10–12
New York	16–6	12–9	9–12	7–15	—	16–6	7–15	14–8
Philadelphia	8–14	10–12	6–12–1	7–15–1	6–16	—	10–12–1	5–17
St. Louis	14–8–1	13–8	10–11	6–15	15–7	12–10–1	—	11–11–1
Washington	11–11–1	14–8	14–8	12–10	8–14	17–5	11–11–1	—

=== Notable transactions ===
- May 29, 1945: Buddy Rosar was traded by the Indians to the Philadelphia Athletics for Frankie Hayes.

=== Roster ===
1945 Cleveland Indians
Roster
Pitchers: 22 Jim Bagby; 33 Paul Calvert; 40 Pete Center; 30 Red Embree; 19 Bob Feller; 25 Steve Gromek; 18 Mel Harder; 34 Earl Henry; 15,35 Hal Kleine; 39 Ed Klieman; 21 Allie Reynolds; 35 Jack Salveson; 32 Al Smith	Catchers: 42 Gene Desautels; 11 Frankie Hayes; 14 Jim McDonnell; 16 Hank Ruszkowski; 12 Red Steiner; Infielders: 5 Lou Boudreau; 2 Al Cihocki; 24 Dutch Meyer; 10 Mickey Rocco; 1 Don Ross; 3 Bob Rothel; 34 Elmer Weingartner; 7 Ed Wheeler; 8 Fred Williams	Outfielders: 33 Stan Benjamin; 42 Eddie Carnett; 1 Roy Cullenbine; 8 Les Fleming; 12,4 Jeff Heath; 17 Myril Hoag; 41 Felix Mackiewicz; 6 Paul O'Dea; 23 Pat Seerey	Manager: 5 Lou Boudreau; Coaches: 27 Ski Melillo; 26 Burt Shotton; 28 George Susce

== Player stats ==
=== Batting ===
==== Starters by position ====
Note: Pos = Position; G = Games played; AB = At bats; H = Hits; Avg. = Batting average; HR = Home runs; RBI = Runs batted in

Pos	Player	G	AB	H	Avg.	HR	RBI
C	Frankie Hayes	119	385	91	.236	6	43
1B	Mickey Rocco	143	565	149	.264	10	56
2B	Dutch Meyer	130	524	153	.292	7	48
SS	Lou Boudreau	97	345	106	.307	3	48
3B	Don Ross	106	363	95	.262	2	43
OF	Pat Seerey	126	414	98	.237	14	56
OF	Jeff Heath	102	370	113	.305	15	61
OF	Felix Mackiewicz	120	359	98	.273	2	37

==== Other batters ====
Note: G = Games played; AB = At bats; H = Hits; Avg. = Batting average; HR = Home runs; RBI = Runs batted in

Player	G	AB	H	Avg.	HR	RBI
Al Cihocki	92	283	60	.212	0	24
Paul O'Dea	87	221	52	.235	1	21
Les Fleming	42	140	46	.329	3	22
Myril Hoag	40	128	27	.211	0	3
Eddie Carnett	30	73	16	.219	0	7
Ed Wheeler	46	72	14	.194	0	2
Jim McDonnell	28	51	10	.196	0	8
Hank Ruszkowski	14	49	10	.204	0	5
Elmer Weingartner	20	39	9	.231	0	1
Stan Benjamin	14	21	7	.333	0	3
Red Steiner	12	20	3	.150	0	2
Fred Williams	16	19	4	.211	0	0
Roy Cullenbine	8	13	1	.077	0	0
Bob Rothel	4	10	2	.200	0	0
Gene Desautels	10	9	1	.111	0	0

=== Pitching ===
==== Starting pitchers ====
Note: G = Games pitched; IP = Innings pitched; W = Wins; L = Losses; ERA = Earned run average; SO = Strikeouts

Player	G	IP	W	L	ERA	SO
Steve Gromek	33	251.0	19	9	2.55	101
Allie Reynolds	44	247.1	18	12	3.20	112
Jim Bagby	25	159.1	8	11	3.73	38
Al Smith	21	133.2	5	12	3.84	34
Mel Harder	11	76.0	3	7	3.67	16

==== Other pitchers ====
Note: G = Games pitched; IP = Innings pitched; W = Wins; L = Losses; ERA = Earned run average; SO = Strikeouts

Player	G	IP	W	L	ERA	SO
Bob Feller	9	72.0	5	3	2.50	59
Red Embree	8	70.0	4	4	1.93	42
Hal Kleine	3	7.0	0	0	3.86	5
Myril Hoag	2	3.0	0	0	0.00	0
Paul O'Dea	1	2.0	0	0	13.50	0
Eddie Carnett	2	2.0	0	0	0.00	1
Paul Calvert	1	1.1	0	0	13.50	1

==== Relief pitchers ====
Note: G = Games pitched; W = Wins; L = Losses; SV = Saves; ERA = Earned run average; SO = Strikeouts

Player	G	W	L	SV	ERA	SO
Ed Klieman	38	5	8	4	3.85	33
Pete Center	31	6	3	1	3.99	34
Jack Salveson	19	0	0	0	3.68	11
Earl Henry	15	0	3	0	5.40	10

== Awards and honors ==
All-Star Game (note: rosters were named by Associated Press writers, but game was not played due to travel restrictions during World War II)

Lou Boudreau, Shortstop

Steve Gromek, Pitcher

Frankie Hayes, Catcher

Jeff Heath, Outfielder

Allie Reynolds, Pitcher

== Farm system ==
Level	Team	League	Manager
AA	Baltimore Orioles	International League	Alphonse "Tommy" Thomas
A	Wilkes-Barre Barons	Eastern League	Dick Porter and Mike McNally
D	Batavia Clippers	PONY League	Jack Tighe

LEAGUE CHAMPIONS: Batavia
