= 1945 Chicago White Sox season =

1945 Chicago White Sox
- League: American League
- Ballpark: Comiskey Park
- City: Chicago, Illinois
- Owners: Grace Comiskey
- General managers: Harry Grabiner
- Managers: Jimmy Dykes
- Radio: WJJD/WIND (AM) (Jack Brickhouse)

The 1945 Chicago White Sox season was the White Sox's 45th season in the major leagues, and their 46th season overall. They finished with a record of 71–78, good enough for sixth place in the American League, 15 games behind the first place Detroit Tigers.

== Regular season ==
=== Season standings ===
American League
Team	W	L	Pct.	GB	Home	Road
Detroit Tigers	88	65	.575	—	50‍–‍26	38‍–‍39
Washington Senators	87	67	.565	1½	46‍–‍31	41‍–‍36
St. Louis Browns	81	70	.536	6	47‍–‍27	34‍–‍43
New York Yankees	81	71	.533	6½	48‍–‍28	33‍–‍43
Cleveland Indians	73	72	.503	11	44‍–‍33	29‍–‍39
Chicago White Sox	71	78	.477	15	44‍–‍29	27‍–‍49
Boston Red Sox	71	83	.461	17½	42‍–‍35	29‍–‍48
Philadelphia Athletics	52	98	.347	34½	39‍–‍35	13‍–‍63

=== Record vs. opponents ===
1945 American League record Sources:
Team	BOS	CWS	CLE	DET	NYY	PHA	SLB	WSH
Boston	—	9–13	11–11	12–10–1	6–16	14–8	8–14–1	11–11–1
Chicago	13–9	—	11–8–1	10–12	9–12	12–10	8–13	8–14
Cleveland	11–11	8–11–1	—	11–11	12–9	12–6–1	11–10	8–14
Detroit	10–12–1	12–10	11–11	—	15–7	15–7–1	15–6	10–12
New York	16–6	12–9	9–12	7–15	—	16–6	7–15	14–8
Philadelphia	8–14	10–12	6–12–1	7–15–1	6–16	—	10–12–1	5–17
St. Louis	14–8–1	13–8	10–11	6–15	15–7	12–10–1	—	11–11–1
Washington	11–11–1	14–8	14–8	12–10	8–14	17–5	11–11–1	—

=== Opening Day lineup ===
- Wally Moses, RF
- Oris Hockett, CF
- Johnny Dickshot, LF
- Bill Nagel, 1B
- Tony Cuccinello, 3B
- Roy Schalk, 2B
- Cass Michaels, SS
- Mike Tresh, C
- Thornton Lee, P

=== Roster ===
1945 Chicago White Sox
Roster
Pitchers: 46 Earl Caldwell; 18 Bill Dietrich; 45 Orval Grove; 35 Joe Haynes; 26 Johnny Humphries; 23 Johnny Johnson; 27 Thornton Lee; 48 Ed Lopat; 17 Frank Papish; 19 Buck Ross; 37 Clay Touchstone	Catchers: 14 Vince Castino; 15 Mike Tresh; Infielders: 4 Luke Appling; 8 Floyd Baker; 47 Tony Cuccinello; 4,59 Kerby Farrell; 28 Cass Michaels; 24,7 Bill Nagel; 3 Joe Orengo; 2 Danny Reynolds; 6 Roy Schalk	Outfielders: 12 Guy Curtright; 36 Johnny Dickshot; 25 Oris Hockett; 9 Wally Moses; 34 Bill Mueller	Manager: 5 Jimmy Dykes; Coaches: 22 Mule Haas; 33 Bing Miller; 38 Muddy Ruel

== Player stats ==
=== Batting ===
Note: G = Games played; AB = At bats; R = Runs scored; H = Hits; 2B = Doubles; 3B = Triples; HR = Home runs; RBI = Runs batted in; BB = Base on balls; SO = Strikeouts; AVG = Batting average; SB = Stolen bases

Player	G	AB	R	H	2B	3B	HR	RBI	BB	SO	AVG	SB
Luke Appling, SS	18	57	12	21	2	2	1	10	12	7	.368	1
Floyd Baker, 3B, 2B	82	208	22	52	8	0	0	19	23	12	.250	3
Vince Castino, C	26	36	2	8	1	0	0	4	3	7	.222	0
Tony Cuccinello, 3B	118	402	50	124	25	3	2	49	45	19	.308	6
Guy Curtright, OF	98	324	51	91	15	7	4	32	39	29	.281	3
Johnny Dickshot, LF	130	486	74	147	19	10	4	58	48	41	.302	18
Kerby Farrell, 1B	103	396	44	102	11	3	0	34	24	18	.258	4
Oris Hockett, CF	106	417	46	122	23	4	2	55	27	30	.293	10
Cass Michaels, SS	129	445	47	109	8	5	2	54	37	28	.245	8
Wally Moses, RF	140	569	79	168	35	15	2	50	69	33	.295	11
Bill Mueller, CF	13	9	3	0	0	0	0	0	2	1	.000	1
Bill Nagel, 1B	67	220	21	46	10	3	3	27	15	41	.209	3
Joe Orengo, 3B	17	15	5	1	0	0	0	1	3	2	.067	0
Danny Reynolds, SS, 2B	29	72	6	12	2	1	0	4	3	8	.167	1
Roy Schalk, 2B	133	513	50	127	13	1	1	65	32	41	.248	3
Mike Tresh, C	150	458	50	114	12	0	0	47	65	37	.249	6

Player	G	AB	R	H	2B	3B	HR	RBI	BB	SO	AVG	SB
Earl Caldwell, P	27	37	4	8	1	0	0	4	0	8	.216	0
Bill Dietrich, P	18	36	2	6	0	1	0	0	5	22	.167	0
Orval Grove, P	33	71	4	7	1	0	0	4	4	23	.099	0
Joe Haynes, P	15	40	0	7	0	0	0	2	0	2	.175	0
Johnny Humphries, P	22	54	1	8	0	0	0	2	2	19	.148	0
Johnny Johnson, P	29	14	1	4	2	0	0	2	3	6	.286	0
Thornton Lee, P	29	78	6	14	1	0	0	6	5	15	.179	0
Eddie Lopat, P	32	82	13	24	4	0	1	13	2	9	.293	0
Frank Papish, P	19	26	3	6	1	0	0	1	2	7	.231	0
Buck Ross, P	13	11	0	2	0	0	0	1	0	2	.182	0
Clay Touchstone, P	6	1	0	0	0	0	0	0	0	0	.000	0
Team totals	150	5077	596	1330	204	55	22	544	470	467	.262	78

=== Pitching ===
Note: W = Wins; L = Losses; ERA = Earned run average; G = Games pitched; GS = Games started; SV = Saves; IP = Innings pitched; H = Hits allowed; R = Runs allowed; ER = Earned runs allowed; HR = Home runs allowed; BB = Walks allowed; K = Strikeouts

Player	W	L	ERA	G	GS	SV	IP	H	R	ER	HR	BB	K
Earl Caldwell	6	7	3.59	27	11	7	105.1	108	50	42	8	37	45
Bill Dietrich	7	10	4.19	18	16	0	122.1	136	61	57	4	36	43
Orval Grove	14	12	3.44	33	30	1	217.0	233	100	83	12	68	54
Joe Haynes	5	5	3.55	14	13	1	104.0	92	44	41	5	29	34
Johnny Humphries	6	14	4.24	22	21	1	153.0	172	83	72	11	48	33
Johnny Johnson	3	0	4.26	29	0	4	69.2	85	39	33	1	35	38
Thornton Lee	15	12	2.44	29	28	0	228.1	208	81	62	7	76	108
Eddie Lopat	10	13	4.11	26	24	1	199.1	226	101	91	8	56	74
Frank Papish	4	4	3.74	19	5	1	84.1	75	36	35	3	40	45
Buck Ross	1	1	5.79	13	2	0	37.1	51	28	24	3	17	8
Clay Touchstone	0	0	5.40	6	0	0	10.0	14	10	6	1	6	4
Team totals	71	78	3.69	150	150	13	1330.2	1400	633	546	63	448	486
