= 1946 Cleveland Indians season =

1946 Cleveland Indians
- League: American League
- Ballpark: League Park; Cleveland Municipal Stadium
- City: Cleveland, Ohio
- Owners: Alva Bradley, Bill Veeck
- General managers: Roger Peckinpaugh, Bill Veeck
- Managers: Lou Boudreau
- Radio: WGAR (AM) · WHK · WJW · WTAM (Jack Graney, Bob Neal, Earl Harper, Don Campbell, Tom Manning)

In 1946, Bill Veeck finally became the owner of a major league team, the Cleveland Indians. He immediately put the team's games on radio, and set about to put his own indelible stamp on the franchise. Actor Bob Hope also acquired a minority share of the Indians.

== Offseason ==
- Prior to 1946 season: Al Aber was signed as an amateur free agent by the Indians.

== Regular season ==
During the season, Bob Feller became the last pitcher to win at least 25 games in one season for the Indians in the 20th century.

=== Season standings ===
American League
| Team | W | L | Pct. | GB | Home | Road |
|---|---|---|---|---|---|---|
| Boston Red Sox | 104 | 50 | .675 | — | 61‍–‍16 | 43‍–‍34 |
| Detroit Tigers | 92 | 62 | .597 | 12 | 48‍–‍30 | 44‍–‍32 |
| New York Yankees | 87 | 67 | .565 | 17 | 47‍–‍30 | 40‍–‍37 |
| Washington Senators | 76 | 78 | .494 | 28 | 38‍–‍38 | 38‍–‍40 |
| Chicago White Sox | 74 | 80 | .481 | 30 | 40‍–‍38 | 34‍–‍42 |
| Cleveland Indians | 68 | 86 | .442 | 36 | 36‍–‍41 | 32‍–‍45 |
| St. Louis Browns | 66 | 88 | .429 | 38 | 35‍–‍41 | 31‍–‍47 |
| Philadelphia Athletics | 49 | 105 | .318 | 55 | 31‍–‍46 | 18‍–‍59 |

=== Record vs. opponents ===
1946 American League record Sources:
| Team | BOS | CWS | CLE | DET | NYY | PHA | SLB | WSH |
|---|---|---|---|---|---|---|---|---|
| Boston | — | 13–9 | 15–7 | 15–7–1 | 14–8 | 17–5 | 14–8–1 | 16–6 |
| Chicago | 9–13 | — | 13–9–1 | 10–12 | 8–14 | 12–10 | 12–10 | 10–12 |
| Cleveland | 7–15 | 9–13–1 | — | 5–17 | 10–12 | 15–7 | 15–7–1 | 7–15 |
| Detroit | 7–15–1 | 12–10 | 17–5 | — | 13–9 | 17–5 | 14–8 | 12–10 |
| New York | 8–14 | 14–8 | 12–10 | 9–13 | — | 16–6 | 14–8 | 14–8 |
| Philadelphia | 5–17 | 10–12 | 7–15 | 5–17 | 6–16 | — | 10–12 | 6–16–1 |
| St. Louis | 8–14–1 | 10–12 | 7–15–1 | 8–14 | 8–14 | 12–10 | — | 13–9 |
| Washington | 6–16 | 12–10 | 15–7 | 10–12 | 8–14 | 16–6–1 | 9–13 | — |

=== Notable transactions ===
- June 26, 1946: Mickey Rocco and cash were traded by the Indians to the Chicago Cubs for Heinz Becker.
- July 4, 1946: The Indians traded a player to be named later to the Chicago White Sox for Tom Jordan. The Indians completed the deal by sending Frankie Hayes to the White Sox on July 15.

=== Roster ===
1946 Cleveland Indians
Roster
| Pitchers: 22 Joe Berry; 35 Don Black; 29 Pete Center; 36 Red Embree; 19 Bob Feller; 26 Tom Ferrick; 45 Ray Flanigan; 31 Charlie Gassaway; 25 Steve Gromek; 18 Mel Harder; 22 Vic Johnson; 33 Ed Klieman; 30 Joe Krakauskas; 20 Bob Kuzava; 6 Bob Lemon; 33 Ralph McCabe; 31 Johnny Podgajny; 21 Allie Reynolds; 33 Les Webber | Catchers: 11 Frankie Hayes; 14 Jim Hegan; 26 Tom Jordan; 12 Sherm Lollar; 42 Ralph Weigel; Infielders: 15 Heinz Becker; 5 Lou Boudreau; 20 Charlie Brewster; 4 Jack Conway; 8 Les Fleming; 9 Ken Keltner; 3 Dutch Meyer; 40 Howie Moss; 12 Rusty Peters; 9 Jackie Price; 34 Eddie Robinson; 10 Mickey Rocco; 1 Don Ross; 39 Ted Sepkowski; 10 Jimmy Wasdell | Outfielders: 15,7 George Case; 32 Hank Edwards; 17 Felix Mackiewicz; 24 Buster Mills; 46 Dale Mitchell; 23 Pat Seerey; 16 Gene Woodling; Other batters: 7 Blas Monaco | Manager: 5 Lou Boudreau; Coaches: 27 Ski Melillo; 24 Buster Mills; 28 George Susce |

== Player stats ==
=== Batting ===
==== Starters by position ====
Note: Pos = Position; G = Games played; AB = At bats; H = Hits; Avg. = Batting average; HR = Home runs; RBI = Runs batted in

| Pos | Player | G | AB | H | Avg. | HR | RBI |
|---|---|---|---|---|---|---|---|
| C | Jim Hegan | 88 | 271 | 64 | .236 | 0 | 17 |
| 1B | Les Fleming | 99 | 306 | 85 | .278 | 8 | 42 |
| 2B | Dutch Meyer | 72 | 207 | 48 | .232 | 0 | 16 |
| SS | Lou Boudreau | 140 | 515 | 151 | .293 | 6 | 62 |
| 3B | Ken Keltner | 116 | 398 | 96 | .241 | 13 | 45 |
| OF | Pat Seerey | 117 | 404 | 91 | .225 | 26 | 62 |
| OF | Hank Edwards | 124 | 458 | 138 | .301 | 10 | 54 |
| OF | George Case | 118 | 484 | 109 | .225 | 1 | 22 |

==== Other batters ====
Note: G = Games played; AB = At bats; H = Hits; Avg. = Batting average; HR = Home runs; RBI = Runs batted in

| Player | G | AB | H | Avg. | HR | RBI |
|---|---|---|---|---|---|---|
| Jack Conway | 68 | 258 | 58 | .225 | 0 | 18 |
| Felix Mackiewicz | 78 | 258 | 67 | .260 | 0 | 16 |
| Ray Mack | 61 | 171 | 35 | .205 | 1 | 9 |
| Frankie Hayes | 51 | 156 | 40 | .256 | 3 | 18 |
| Don Ross | 55 | 153 | 41 | .268 | 3 | 14 |
| Heinz Becker | 50 | 147 | 44 | .299 | 0 | 17 |
| Gene Woodling | 61 | 133 | 25 | .188 | 0 | 9 |
| Mickey Rocco | 34 | 98 | 24 | .245 | 2 | 14 |
| Bob Lemon | 55 | 89 | 16 | .180 | 1 | 4 |
| Sherm Lollar | 28 | 62 | 15 | .242 | 1 | 9 |
| Dale Mitchell | 11 | 44 | 19 | .432 | 0 | 5 |
| Jimmy Wasdell | 32 | 41 | 11 | .268 | 0 | 4 |
| Tom Jordan | 14 | 35 | 7 | .200 | 1 | 3 |
| Howie Moss | 8 | 32 | 2 | .063 | 0 | 0 |
| Eddie Robinson | 8 | 30 | 12 | .400 | 3 | 4 |
| Buster Mills | 9 | 22 | 6 | .273 | 0 | 3 |
| Rusty Peters | 9 | 21 | 6 | .286 | 0 | 2 |
| Jackie Price | 7 | 13 | 3 | .231 | 0 | 0 |
| Ralph Weigel | 6 | 12 | 2 | .167 | 0 | 0 |
| Ted Sopkowski | 2 | 8 | 4 | .500 | 0 | 1 |
| Blas Monaco | 12 | 6 | 0 | .000 | 0 | 0 |
| Charlie Brewster | 3 | 2 | 0 | .000 | 0 | 0 |

=== Pitching ===
==== Starting pitchers ====
Note: G = Games pitched; IP = Innings pitched; W = Wins; L = Losses; ERA = Earned run average; SO = Strikeouts

| Player | G | IP | W | L | ERA | SO |
|---|---|---|---|---|---|---|
| Bob Feller | 48 | 371.1 | 26 | 15 | 2.18 | 348 |
| Red Embree | 28 | 200.0 | 8 | 12 | 3.47 | 87 |
| Allie Reynolds | 31 | 183.1 | 11 | 15 | 3.88 | 107 |
| Steve Gromek | 29 | 153.2 | 5 | 15 | 4.33 | 75 |
| Mel Harder | 13 | 92.1 | 5 | 4 | 3.41 | 21 |

==== Other pitchers ====
Note: G = Games pitched; IP = Innings pitched; W = Wins; L = Losses; ERA = Earned run average; SO = Strikeouts

| Player | G | IP | W | L | ERA | SO |
|---|---|---|---|---|---|---|
| Charlie Gassaway | 13 | 50.2 | 1 | 1 | 3.91 | 23 |
| Don Black | 18 | 43.2 | 1 | 2 | 4.53 | 15 |
| Ed Klieman | 9 | 15.0 | 0 | 0 | 6.60 | 2 |
| Vic Johnson | 9 | 13.2 | 0 | 1 | 9.22 | 3 |
| Bob Kuzava | 2 | 12.0 | 1 | 0 | 3.00 | 4 |
| Ray Flanigan | 3 | 9.0 | 0 | 1 | 11.00 | 2 |
| Johnny Podgajny | 6 | 9.0 | 0 | 0 | 5.00 | 4 |
| Les Webber | 4 | 5.1 | 1 | 1 | 23.63 | 5 |
| Ralph McCabe | 1 | 4.0 | 0 | 1 | 11.25 | 3 |

==== Relief pitchers ====
Note: G = Games pitched; W = Wins; L = Losses; SV = Saves; ERA = Earned run average; SO = Strikeouts

| Player | G | W | L | SV | ERA | SO |
|---|---|---|---|---|---|---|
| Bob Lemon | 32 | 4 | 5 | 1 | 2.49 | 39 |
| Joe Krakauskas | 29 | 2 | 5 | 1 | 5.51 | 20 |
| Joe Berry | 21 | 3 | 6 | 1 | 3.38 | 16 |
| Pete Center | 21 | 0 | 2 | 1 | 4.97 | 6 |
| Tom Ferrick | 9 | 0 | 0 | 1 | 5.00 | 9 |

== Awards and honors ==
- Bob Feller, Led American League with 36 complete games (it would also be the highest total in the decade)

All-Star Game

Bob Feller, Pitcher (starter)

Frankie Hayes, Catcher (starter)

Ken Keltner, Third baseman (starter)

== Farm system ==
| Level | Team | League | Manager |
|---|---|---|---|
| AAA | Baltimore Orioles | International League | Alphonse "Tommy" Thomas |
| AA | Oklahoma City Indians | Texas League | Roy Schalk |
| A | Wilkes-Barre Barons | Eastern League | Dick Porter |
| B | Harrisburg Senators | Interstate League | Les Bell |
| C | Bakersfield Indians | California League | Martin Metrovich and Tony Governor |
| C | Pittsfield Electrics | Canadian–American League | Tony Rensa |
| C | Clovis Pioneers | West Texas–New Mexico League | Harold Webb |
| D | Centreville Orioles | Eastern Shore League | Jim McLeod |
| D | Dayton Indians | Ohio State League | Frank Parenti and Ival Goodman |
| D | Batavia Clippers | PONY League | Jack Tighe |
| D | Appleton Papermakers | Wisconsin State League | Ray Powell |

LEAGUE CHAMPIONS: Harrisburg, Centreville, Batavia
