= Ray Flanigan =

American baseball player (1923–1993)

- Pitcher
- Born: January 8, 1923; Morgantown, West Virginia, U.S.
- Died: March 28, 1993 (aged 70); Baltimore, Maryland, U.S.
- Batted: Right Threw: Right

MLB debut
- September 20, 1946, for the Cleveland Indians

Last MLB appearance
- September 28, 1946, for the Cleveland Indians

MLB statistics
- Win–loss record: 0–1
- Earned run average: 11.00
- Innings pitched: 9
- Stats at Baseball Reference

Teams
- Cleveland Indians (1946)

Raymond Arthur Flanigan (January 8, 1923 – March 28, 1993) was an American professional baseball player, a right-handed pitcher who appeared in three games in Major League Baseball for the Cleveland Indians at the tail end of the 1946 season. The native of Morgantown, West Virginia, stood 6 feet (1.8 m) tall and weighed 190 pounds (86 kg).

Flanigan's minor league career began in 1941, but he missed the 1943–1945 seasons while serving in the European Theater of Operations with the United States Army during World War II. His Major League trial came after he won 13 of 27 decisions for the 1946 Baltimore Orioles of the Triple-A International League. His three MLB appearances all came against the Detroit Tigers — two as a relief pitcher and one as a starter. His second MLB game was his most successful, as he surrendered only one hit and one unearned run in 3 1/3 innings in relief of Steve Gromek as the Indians fell, 4–3, on September 22 at Cleveland Stadium.

Altogether, Flanagan gave up 11 hits and 11 earned runs in nine total innings pitched in the Majors, with two strikeouts and eight bases on balls. He retired from pitching in 1949.
