= Russ Lyon =

American baseball player (1913–1975)

- Lyon with the Cleveland Indians, c. 1944
- Catcher
- Born: June 26, 1913; Ball Ground, Georgia
- Died: December 24, 1975 (aged 62); Calhoun Falls, South Carolina
- Batted: Right Threw: Right

MLB debut
- April 21, 1944, for the Cleveland Indians

Last MLB appearance
- May 27, 1944, for the Cleveland Indians

MLB statistics
- Batting average: .182 (2-for-11)
- RBI: 0
- Home runs: 0
- Stats at Baseball Reference

Teams
- Cleveland Indians (1944)

Russell Mayo Lyon (June 26, 1913 – December 24, 1975) was a professional baseball catcher who played seven games for the 1944 Cleveland Indians of Major League Baseball (MLB). Listed at 6 feet 1 inch (1.85 m) and 230 pounds (100 kg), he batted and threw right-handed.

== Biography ==
Lyon attended the Georgia School of Technology (Georgia Tech) where he played on the freshman college football and freshman college baseball teams. He played in minor league baseball during 1937–1939 and 1944–1945. In five minor league seasons, he appeared in over 300 games. During his first professional season, 1937 with the Leesburg Gondoliers, he played as a first baseman; thereafter, he played as a catcher.

Near the start of the 1944 season, Lyon was described as "a former semi-pro." He was one of many players who made their only major league appearances during World War II. In April and May of 1944, Lyon played in seven games for the Cleveland Indians. Offensively, he was 2-for-11 at the plate for a .182 batting average. His hits came during his first two games with Cleveland; a single on April 21 off of Stubby Overmire of the Detroit Tigers, and a single on April 23 off of Rufe Gentry, also of the Tigers. Defensively, Lyon appeared at catcher in three games for a total of 20 innings; he committed one error in 11 total chances for a .909 fielding average. On June 9, Cleveland sent Lyon and cash to the minor league Indianapolis Indians in exchange for catcher Norm Schlueter, who had prior major league experience with the Chicago White Sox.

Born in 1913 in Ball Ground, Georgia, Lyon died in 1975 in Calhoun Falls, South Carolina, and was interred in Abbeville, South Carolina. At the time of his death, he worked as a master mechanic; he was married and had three sons.
