= Jackie Price =

American baseball player (1912–1967)

- Shortstop
- Born: November 13, 1912; Winborn, Mississippi, U.S.
- Died: October 2, 1967 (aged 54); San Francisco, California, U.S.
- Batted: Left Threw: Right

MLB debut
- August 18, 1946, for the Cleveland Indians

Last MLB appearance
- September 20, 1946, for the Cleveland Indians

MLB statistics
- Batting average: .231
- Home runs: 0
- Runs batted in: 0
- Stats at Baseball Reference

Teams
- Cleveland Indians (1946)

John Thomas Reid Price (November 13, 1912 – October 2, 1967) was an American Major League Baseball shortstop who played in seven games for the Cleveland Indians during the 1946 Cleveland Indians season.

He was known for delighting fans with his skills – such as batting while hanging upside-down or throwing three balls to three different players in one movement – and was dubbed "the Clown Prince of Baseball" for his other antics, which also included releasing a pair of five-foot boa constrictors on board a train.

Price briefly teamed up with Max Patkin, another baseball clown; together they were described by Boston Red Sox manager Lou Boudreau as the "funniest show I ever saw".

On October 2, 1967, Price died by suicide by hanging himself.
