= Bonness =

Bonness is a surname. Notable people with the surname include:

- Bill Bonness (1923–1977), American baseball player
- Rik Bonness (born 1954), American football player
- Will Bonness (born 1985), Canadian jazz pianist
