= Hal Kleine =

American baseball player (1923–1957)

- Pitcher
- Born: June 8, 1923; St. Louis, Missouri, U.S.
- Died: December 10, 1957 (aged 34); St. Louis, Missouri, U.S.
- Batted: Left Threw: Left

debut
- April 26, 1944, for the Cleveland Indians

Last MLB appearance
- June 1, 1945, for the Cleveland Indians

Career statistics
- Win–loss record: 1–2
- Earned run average: 5.48
- Strikeouts: 18
- Stats at Baseball Reference

Teams
- Cleveland Indians (1944–1945)

Harold John Kleine (June 8, 1923 – December 10, 1957) was an American Major League Baseball pitcher who played for two seasons for the Cleveland Indians, appearing in 11 games during the 1944 season and three games in the 1945 season.
