= Steve Biras =

American baseball player (1917–1965)

Steve Biras Jr
- Second baseman
- Born: February 26, 1917; East Saint Louis, Illinois, U.S.
- Died: April 21, 1965 (aged 48); Saint Louis, Missouri, U.S.
- Batted: Right Threw: Right

MLB debut
- September 15, 1944, for the Cleveland Indians

Last MLB appearance
- September 26, 1944, for the Cleveland Indians

MLB statistics
- Batting average: 1.000
- At-bats: 2
- Hits: 2
- Stats at Baseball Reference

Teams
- Cleveland Indians (1944)

Stefan Alexander Biras Jr (February 26, 1917 – April 21, 1965) was an American Major League Baseball second baseman who played for one season. He played for the Cleveland Indians from September 15, 1944, to September 26, 1944.

He was born on February 26, 1917, to Steve Biras Sr., a mechanic from Czechoslovakia. He was of Slovak descent. Biras originally played semi-pro baseball in St. Louis before being signed by the Cleveland Indians. He played in only two games. He debuted on September 15, 1944, against the Detroit Tigers, pinch hitting for pitcher Ray Poat in the fifth inning with Cleveland trailing 5–0. Against Detroit pitching ace, and 1944 American League MVP Hal Newhouser, Biras singled in his first Major League at bat. This game would be Newhouser's 25th victory in a season in which he won 29 games.

Biras' last game came on September 26 in an 8–3 loss to the Washington Senators. Biras came on as a substitute for second baseman Ray Mack, and made one fielding error, one putout and one fielding assist for a fielding average of .667. In his lone at bat in the game, Biras hit a single off of Dutch Leonard, driving in two runners (RBIs).

After the 1944 season ended, he was assigned to the Wilkes-Barre Barons, but refused to report to the team. He instead returned to his semi-pro team in St. Louis, ending his professional career. Biras died on April 21, 1965, in St. Louis, Missouri, at the age of 48.
