= Earl Henry =

American baseball player (1917–2002)

- Pitcher
- Born: June 10, 1917; Roseville, Ohio, U.S.
- Died: December 10, 2002 (aged 85); Zanesville, Ohio, U.S.
- Batted: Left Threw: Left

MLB debut
- September 23, 1944, for the Cleveland Indians

Last MLB appearance
- July 20, 1945, for the Cleveland Indians

MLB statistics
- Win–loss record: 1–4
- Strikeouts: 15
- Earned run average: 5.03
- Stats at Baseball Reference

Teams
- Cleveland Indians (1944–1945)

Earl Clifford Henry (June 10, 1917 – December 10, 2002), nicknamed "Hook", was an American Major League Baseball pitcher who played for two seasons. He pitched two games for the Cleveland Indians during the 1944 Cleveland Indians season and 15 games during the 1945 Cleveland Indians season.
