= Belmore, Ohio =

- Village
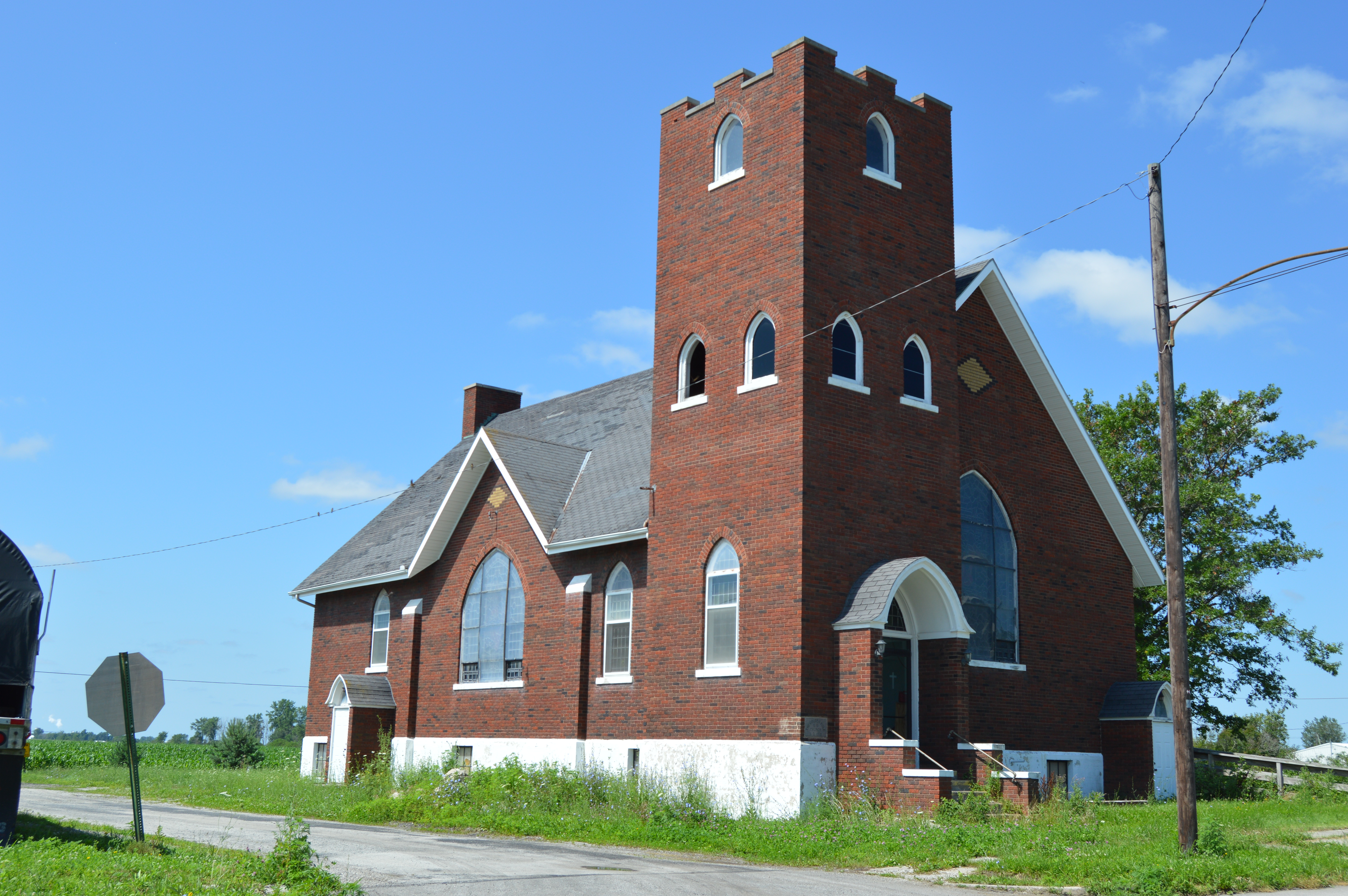
- Former Methodist church

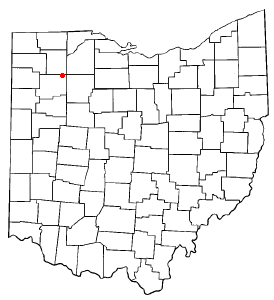
- Location of Belmore, Ohio

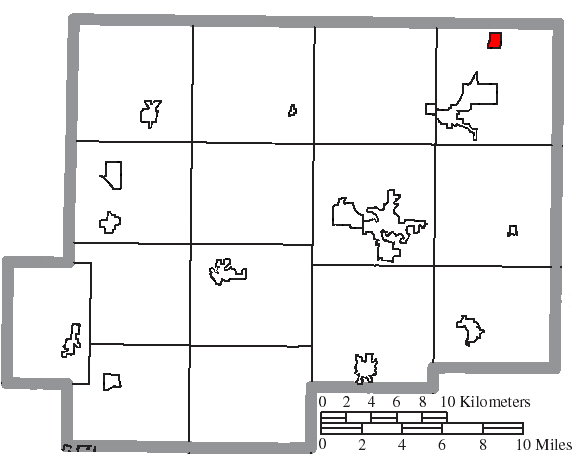
- Location of Belmore in Putnam County
- Coordinates: 41°09′17″N 83°56′30″W
- Country: United States
- State: Ohio
- County: Putnam

Area
  - Total: 0.44 sq mi (1.15 km^{2})
  - Land: 0.44 sq mi (1.15 km^{2})
  - Water: 0 sq mi (0.00 km^{2})
- Elevation: 732 ft (223 m)

Population (2020)
  - Total: 65
  - Estimate (2023): 60
  - Density: 146.6/sq mi (56.59/km^{2})
- Time zone: UTC-5 (Eastern (EST))
  - Summer (DST): UTC-4 (EDT)
- ZIP code: 45815
- Area code: 419
- FIPS code: 39-05396
- GNIS feature ID: 2398087

Belmore is a village in Putnam County, Ohio, United States. The population was 65 at the 2020 census.

== History ==
Belmore was originally called Montgomeryville, and under the latter name was platted in 1862. A post office called Belmore was established in 1856, and was discontinued in 1964. Belmore was incorporated as a village in 1882.

== Geography ==
According to the United States Census Bureau, the village has a total area of 0.43 square miles (1.11 km^{2}), all land. There are no bodies of water in Belmore.

== Demographics ==
Historical population
Census	Pop.	Note	%±
1870	261		—
1880	445		70.5%
1890	414		−7.0%
1900	334		−19.3%
1910	298		−10.8%
1920	269		−9.7%
1930	251		−6.7%
1940	238		−5.2%
1950	216		−9.2%
1960	232		7.4%
1970	319		37.5%
1980	205		−35.7%
1990	161		−21.5%
2000	171		6.2%
2010	143		−16.4%
2020	65		−54.5%
2023 (est.)	60	▼	−7.7%
U.S. Decennial Census

=== 2010 census ===
As of the census of 2010, there were 143 people, 40 households, and 33 families living in the village. The population density was 332.6 inhabitants per square mile (128.4/km^{2}). There were 55 housing units at an average density of 127.9 per square mile (49.4/km^{2}). The racial makeup of the village was 71.3% White, 0.7% Native American, 25.2% from other races, and 2.8% from two or more races. Hispanic or Latino of any race were 29.4% of the population.

There were 40 households, of which 52.5% had children under the age of 18 living with them, 52.5% were married couples living together, 20.0% had a female householder with no husband present, 10.0% had a male householder with no wife present, and 17.5% were non-families. 15.0% of all households were made up of individuals, and 5% had someone living alone who was 65 years of age or older. The average household size was 3.58 and the average family size was 3.88.

The median age in the village was 27.5 years. 39.2% of residents were under the age of 18; 8.4% were between the ages of 18 and 24; 20.3% were from 25 to 44; 21% were from 45 to 64; and 11.2% were 65 years of age or older. The gender makeup of the village was 50.3% male and 49.7% female.

=== 2000 census ===
As of the census of 2000, there were 171 people, 50 households, and 42 families living in the village. The population density was 401.4 inhabitants per square mile (155.0/km^{2}). There were 56 housing units at an average density of 131.4 per square mile (50.7/km^{2}). The racial makeup of the village was 77.19% White, 0.58% Native American, 0.58% Asian, 21.05% from other races, and 0.58% from two or more races. Hispanic or Latino of any race were 25.73% of the population.

There were 50 households, out of which 48.0% had children under the age of 18 living with them, 64.0% were married couples living together, 6.0% had a female householder with no husband present, and 16.0% were non-families. 10.0% of all households were made up of individuals, and 4.0% had someone living alone who was 65 years of age or older. The average household size was 3.42 and the average family size was 3.62.

In the village, the population was spread out, with 37.4% under the age of 42, 6.4% from 18 to 24, 28.7% from 25 to 44, 22.8% from 45 to 64, and 4.7% who were 65 years of age or older. The median age was 29 years. For every 100 females there were 83.9 males. For every 100 females age 18 and over, there were 105.8 males.

The median income for a household in the village was $42,500, and the median income for a family was $37,143. Males had a median income of $35,375 versus $30,625 for females. The per capita income for the village was $12,887. About 28.0% of families and 34.3% of the population were below the poverty line, including 51.9% of those under the age of eighteen and none of those 65 or over.

== Notable people ==
- Johnny Johnson, baseball player.
