= Ralph McCabe =

Canadian baseball player (1918–1974)

- Pitcher
- Born: October 21, 1918; Napanee, Ontario
- Died: May 3, 1974 (aged 55); Windsor, Ontario
- Batted: Right Threw: Right

MLB debut
- September 18, 1946, for the Cleveland Indians

Last MLB appearance
- September 18, 1946, for the Cleveland Indians

MLB statistics
- Win–loss record: 0–1
- Strikeouts: 3
- Earned run average: 11.25
- Stats at Baseball Reference

Teams
- Cleveland Indians (1946)

Ralph Herbert McCabe (October 21, 1918 – May 3, 1974), nicknamed "Mack", was a Major League Baseball pitcher born in Napanee, Ontario, Canada. He appeared in one game on September 18 of the 1946 Cleveland Indians season and pitched four innings, allowing five runs off five hits, and took the loss.
