= Max Patkin =

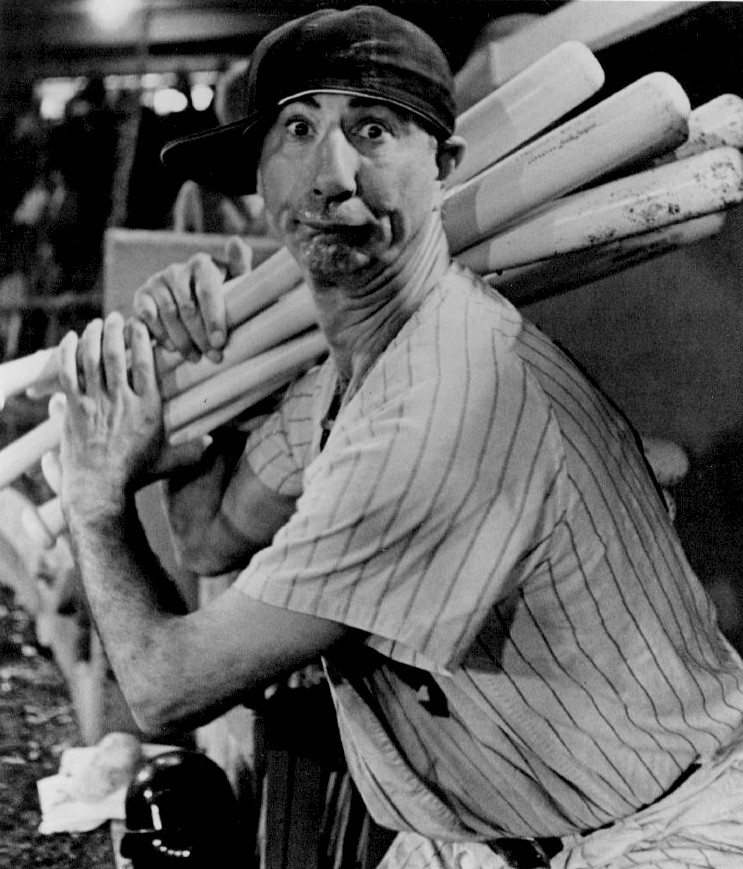
- Patkin in 1967
- Pitcher / Coach
- Born: January 10, 1920; Philadelphia, Pennsylvania, U.S.
- Died: October 30, 1999 (aged 79); Paoli, Pennsylvania, U.S.
- Batted: Right Threw: Right
- Stats at Baseball Reference

Teams
- As coach: Cleveland Indians (1946–1949)

Max Patkin (January 10, 1920 – October 30, 1999) was an American baseball player and clown, best known as the Clown Prince of Baseball (a play on "Crown Prince").

Patkin was the third "officially" crowned Clown Prince of Baseball, after Al Schacht and Jackie Price, though that nickname has also been applied to St. Louis Browns third baseman Arlie Latham among others. Patkin performed for 51 years as a baseball clown.

== Career ==
After an arm injury curtailed his minor league career, Patkin joined the Navy during World War II.

Stationed in Hawaii in 1944, Patkin was pitching for a service team, and Joe DiMaggio homered off the lanky right-hander. In mock anger, Patkin threw his glove down then followed DiMaggio around the bases, much to the delight of the fans—and a career was born.

Later in the 1940s, Patkin was hired as a First Base coach by Bill Veeck and the Cleveland Indians. After Veeck sold the team in 1949, Patkin began barnstorming around the country.

As a barnstormer, Patkin played minor league stadiums throughout the United States and Canada. He had a face seemingly made of rubber which he could contort into various shapes. Patkin was rail thin and wore a baggy uniform with a question mark (?) on the back in place of a number, and a ballcap that was always askew. While some derided his act as corny, he became a beloved figure in baseball circles.

The Clown Prince received a promotion in 1988, when Patkin was named King of Baseball at that year's Winter Meetings in Atlanta, and can be seen appearing (as himself) alongside Kevin Costner, Tim Robbins, and Susan Sarandon in the popular baseball movie Bull Durham made the same year.

Patkin estimated he made more than 4,000 appearances. On July 20, 1969, he appeared before a crowd of just four spectators (two of which were the parents of one of the starting pitchers) in Great Falls, Montana, as most fans were home watching the moon landing. Between 1944 and 1993, he did not miss an appearance, by his own account.

In May 2020 Patkin was voted into the Shrine of the Eternals by the Baseball Reliquary, a fan driven collective dedicated to fostering an appreciation of baseball culture in all of its forms.

== Death ==
Patkin retired from clowning in 1995. He died of an aneurysm in 1999, at age 79, in Paoli, Pennsylvania.

== In popular culture ==
In 1988, Patkin was featured as his real-life character in the romantic comedy 1988 baseball film Bull Durham.

Chuck Brodsky, the folksinger and baseball balladeer, has written a song, "Gone to Heaven", about Patkin. It appeared on his 2000 release, Last of the Old Time, and was later collected on his 2002 album, The Baseball Ballads.

The bluesman Watermelon Slim (William P. Homans) wrote and released the song "Max, The Baseball Clown" on his 2008 CD, No Paid Holidays (NorthernBlues Music Inc, Ottawa, Ontario). Homans, who grew up in the minor-league town of Asheville, watched Max Patkin do two shows in successive years in the early 1960s, and wrote a reminiscence of him more than 40 years later.
