= Steve Gromek =

American baseball player (1920–2002)

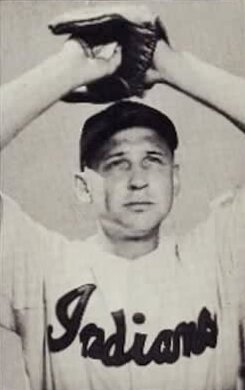
- Pitcher
- Born: January 15, 1920; Hamtramck, Michigan, U.S.
- Died: March 12, 2002 (aged 82); Clinton Charter Township, Michigan, U.S.
- Batted: Switch Threw: Right

MLB debut
- August 18, 1941, for the Cleveland Indians

Last MLB appearance
- July 25, 1957, for the Detroit Tigers

MLB statistics
- Win–loss record: 123–108
- Earned run average: 3.41
- Strikeouts: 904
- Stats at Baseball Reference

Teams
- Cleveland Indians (1941–1953); Detroit Tigers (1953–1957)

Career highlights and awards
- All-Star (1945); World Series champion (1948)

Stephen Joseph Gromek (January 15, 1920 – March 12, 2002) was an American right-handed pitcher in Major League Baseball who played for 17 seasons in the American League with the Cleveland Indians and Detroit Tigers. In 447 career games, Gromek pitched 2,064 2/3 innings and posted a win–loss record of 123–108 with 92 complete games, 17 shutouts, and a 3.41 earned run average (ERA).

Born in Hamtramck, Michigan, Gromek originally began playing professionally with the Indians organization as an infielder, but became a pitcher early on, and made his major league debut in 1941. He played sparingly his first three years before becoming an everyday starter in 1944 and 1945, earning his lone All-Star appearance in the latter year. After the war ended, he became a spot starter, spending time as both a starting pitcher and relief pitcher. Gromek was the winning pitcher in game four of the 1948 World Series with the Cleveland Indians. His career is best remembered for a post game celebratory photo taken of him hugging Larry Doby, the first black player in the American League, whose third inning home run provided the margin of victory. The photo became a symbol for integration in baseball.

Gromek remained in the spot starter role with the Indians until 1953, when he was traded to the Tigers. The Tigers used him solely as a starting pitcher, and had 18 wins in his first full season with them in 1954. He played two more full seasons with the Tigers, and retired during the 1957 season. Gromek then became a player-manager for the Erie Sailors for one year, became a car insurance sales representative after his retirement, and died in 2002.

== Early life and career ==
Gromek was born in Hamtramck, Michigan to Polish immigrant parents. His father worked in Hamtramck as a laborer. While attended St. Ladislaus High School in Hamtramck, Gromek considered becoming a priest, but decided on a career in baseball instead, playing sandlot baseball in the area, as the school did not have a baseball team. Shortly after graduating, Gromek signed with the Cleveland Indians as an infielder after being discovered by Indians scout Bill Bradley. In his first professional season, Gromek batted .283 with two home runs as a second baseman for the Mansfield Braves and Logan Indians. He moved over to shortstop in 1940 with the Michigan State League's Flint Gems. After suffering an injury in his left shoulder that hampered his swing, he decided to become an outfielder. His ability to throw strikes to the plate on throws from the outfield inspired manager Jack Knight, who was a former pitcher, to try him on the mound. Gromek pitched four games, and won all four with a 1.61 ERA. A year later, Gromek went 14–2 with a 2.90 ERA for the newly renamed Flint Arrows. In July, Gromek and the Arrows faced the Indians in an exhibition game, which they won, 3–2; the victory led the Indians to promote him to the major league club a month later. He lost his major league debut to the Washington Senators, and earned his first major league win in his only other start of the season against the Philadelphia Athletics. He spent the rest of the season as a relief pitcher, and finished the season with a 1–1 record and a 4.24 ERA in nine appearances.

New Cleveland manager Lou Boudreau used Gromek as a relief pitcher in 1942. On July 12, facing the Washington Senators at Griffith Stadium, Gromek entered the game in the fifth inning behind 6–5 with two outs and a runner on third. He struck out Al Evans to end the inning without further damage, and earned the win in extra innings, but walked three consecutive batters in the seventh, the third of which forced in a run. Shortly after the game, he was demoted to the double A Baltimore Orioles for the rest of the season, the result of an agreement the Indians and Orioles had made before the season began where the Indians would allow use of certain players during the season if requested. He finished the season with a 2–0 record and a 3.65 ERA in 14 appearances with the Indians, and a 4–6 record with a 5.14 ERA in 20 games with the Orioles. He spent the entire 1943 season with Baltimore, going 16–13 with a 3.34 ERA, with the exception of September, when he received a call up to the major leagues. There, he made three appearances, totaling four innings of work.

== Gromek as a starting pitcher ==
Gromek started the 1944 season in Cleveland's bullpen. On May 16, he entered a game against the Senators in the first inning after starter Allie Reynolds had already allowed three runs. From there, Gromek held the Senators scoreless on just two hits, bringing his ERA for the season down to 0.57 (1 earned run in 15.2 innings). Though the Indians still lost the game, it convinced Boudreau to try Gromek as a starter. On May 21, Gromek made his first start of the season in the second game of a doubleheader with the A's. Through the first six innings, Gromek held the A's scoreless on four hits. Meanwhile, back-to-back home runs by Roy Cullenbine and Pat Seerey in the fourth inning gave Cleveland a 2–0 lead. A seventh-inning error by third baseman Ken Keltner allowed two unearned runs to tie the score, and a wild pitch the following inning allowed the winning run to score. On July 2, after spending June as a reliever, Gromek earned his first win of the season against the Washington Senators after being placed back in the starting rotation, and did not allow a hit until the eighth inning in a 6–3 win; he remained a starter for the rest of the season. On July 14 against the St. Louis Browns, Gromek pitched 14 innings to earn the complete game 3–2 victory over Bob Muncrief, who also pitched all 14 innings for St. Louis. He followed that up with a complete game shutout against the New York Yankees, and 1–0 loss in which Gromek allowed two hits against the Boston Red Sox. He ended the season winning six of his final seven decisions, finishing the year with a 10–9 record with a 2.56 ERA, and had a league leading 7.1 hits per nine innings.

Entering the 1945 season, Gromek was named one of the Indians' main starting pitchers, and would hold that title throughout the season. On June 8, Gromek defeated the Browns, 2–1, to improve to 7–1 with a 1.62 ERA. On July 4, the Indians accomplished one of the more bizarre firsts in baseball history with Gromek on the mound. In a complete game victory over the Yankees, Gromek struck out four. Fifteen outs came via fly balls to the outfield; another four pop-ups were handled by the infielders. Catcher Frankie Hayes caught two foul balls, and the only ground ball outs recorded were handled by first baseman Mickey Rocco unassisted. It was the only time in major league history that a team went nine innings without recording an assist. A week later, Gromek was named to the All-Star team for the 1945 All-Star Game, which was cancelled due to travel restrictions in place during World War II. In late August, Gromek won his 16th game in a 5–4 victory against the Detroit Tigers, but injured his knee when scoring the winning run, causing him to miss two weeks. For the year, Gromek went 19–9, with a career best 2.55 ERA; he ranked fourth in wins and seventh in ERA in the American League that season.

After getting married in the offseason, Gromek entered the 1946 season as one of the four primary starting pitchers alongside Allie Reynolds, as well as Bob Feller and Red Embree who had returned from the war. Gromek started the season by pitching in the home opener against Detroit. In a 7–0 loss, the Tigers allowed two hits, one of which was a single by Gromek, who allowed five runs in six innings. After losing his first three games of the season, he won his next three in May, which included two complete game shutouts against the Athletics and Browns. He followed that up with a four-game losing streak, which went through the end of June. After his June 28 win, however, Gromek fell in a slump, and Indians management reduced his role to that of a part-time starter who would only see action in a few innings at a time. Gromek lost seven straight games between June 28 and September 10 before breaking the streak in his second-to-last appearance of the season, a 4–2 victory against the Yankees. Gromek finished the season with a 5–15 record and a 4.33 ERA in 29 games.

The Indians hired Bill McKechnie as a pitching coach after the 1946 season. One of his first jobs was to work with Gromek during the offseason and improve his pitching due to his struggles the prior year, in particular against left-handed batters. The Indians talked with the Yankees during the offseason about making a trade for second baseman Joe Gordon. The teams settled on Gromek as the main piece originally, but Joe DiMaggio suggested the team trade for Reynolds instead. Gromek remained on the Indians for the 1947 season as a result, but was moved to the bullpen instead of remaining in the starting rotation. The highlight of his season came on July 1 in relief of Feller, who left the game due to injury. In the game against the Browns, he threw 7.2 innings and allowed two runs in a 9–3 victory in what was his longest appearance of the season at that time. For the year, Gromek pitched in 29 games, starting 7, and had a 2–5 record and a 3.74 ERA in 84.1 innings pitched, his first full season in which he pitched under 150 innings.

== 1948 World Series and conversion to spot starter ==
Gromek & Larry Doby after game 4 of the 1948 World Series

Gromek entered the 1948 season fighting for a spot on the pitching staff after spending the offseason recovering from a knee injury, which had bothered the season prior, and while he did make the roster, he remained solely a relief pitcher to start the season. He made one start as a replacement for Don Black on June 6 against the Athletics, and won the game 11–1 in a complete game effort. Boudreau considered moving him into the starting rotation, but instead considered it a one-time appearance due to Black's injury, and he remained in a relief role though mid-July. After a second complete game victory against the Athletics on July 15, Gromek was moved to a part-time starter role, where he remained the rest of the season.

He ended the regular season with a 9–3 record and a 2.84 ERA in 130 innings pitched, and as a result he was a surprise choice to start game four of the 1948 World Series, which was partially due to Boudreau's trust of Gromek, as well as an opportunity to give Bob Feller some rest, as well as the potential series-clinching game five. The Boston Braves countered with Johnny Sain, who had shut out the Indians in game one of the series. Boudreau got the Indians on the board first with a first-inning double that scored Dale Mitchell. The Indians took a 2–0 lead in the third when Larry Doby homered. Gromek, meanwhile, held the Braves scoreless with the exception of a Marv Rickert home run in the seventh inning, giving the Indians the win by a final score of 2–1. Following the game, The Plain Dealer of Cleveland snapped a photograph of Gromek and Doby celebrating in the locker room. Doby had just broken the color barrier in the American League a season earlier, and resistance to integration in baseball was still intense. This spontaneous moment of post game celebration became a symbol of acceptance. In his Hall of Fame acceptance speech, Doby fondly remembered that picture:

That was a feeling from within, the human side of two people, one black and one white. That made up for everything I went through. I would always relate back to that whenever I was insulted or rejected from hotels. I'd always think about that picture. It would take away all the negatives.

Boudreau placed Gromek in the starting rotation to begin the 1949 season, giving the team a big four of Feller, Bob Lemon, Gene Bearden, and Gromek, who had spent the past year working on his curveball to help him improve on his 1948 season. In his first start of the season, he allowed two hits in an 8–2 victory against the Browns. By the end of May, he had an ERA of 2.80, which was among the lowest on the team, but only had a 2–4 record to show for it due to a lack of run support; the four losses included both a 1–0 and 2–0 defeat. With the increased productivity of Early Wynn and Mike Garcia, Gromek fell out of favor with Boudreau, and he was moved primarily to relief duty. After being pulled in the second inning in a July 16 start against the Athletics, he was kept as a reliever the rest of the year. Gromek finished the season with four wins, six losses, and a 3.33 ERA in 92 innings over 27 games, 12 of them starts.

The Indians offered Gromek a salary cut for 1950 due to his losing record the prior year, to which Gromek objected. In voicing his objection, Gromek offered that he would welcome being dealt to his hometown Detroit Tigers. The Indians used a four-man starting rotation for most of the season, relegating Gromek to spot starter status as they had done in prior seasons. The highlight of his season came on May 28 against the Chicago White Sox, throwing a 7–0 complete game shutout, dropping his ERA on the year from 7.98 to 4.94 in the process. Gromek had a 10–7 record and a 3.65 ERA in 31 games on the year. The Indians had a new manager, Al López, entering the 1951 season, and as a result Gromek signed a new contract immediately, feeling that López would utilize him as more than a spot starter and that he would be treated more fairly than he had under Boudreau. Lopez ended up using Gromek the same way Boudreau had, keeping him primarily in the bullpen, but using him as a starting pitcher when one of the regular starters was injured or they needed a second pitcher for a doubleheader. Gromek finished the year with seven wins, four losses, and a 2.77 ERA, lowest on the team, in 27 games.

Gromek remained in his spot starter role for the 1952 season. He struggled in spring training, but he was not considered in danger of losing his role to a rookie, as López felt that he knew what Gromek could and could not do on the mound. He won his first three starts in April and May before getting his first loss of the year, and stayed around .500 the rest of the season. He finished the season with a 7–7 record and a 3.67 ERA in 29 games, 13 of them starts; three of his victories came against the Yankees, of only three pitchers who had three against them that season. His wish to play for the Tigers was granted early in 1953. On June 15, after pitching in five games for the Indians, he, Al Aber, Ray Boone and Dick Weik were traded to the Tigers for Owen Friend, Joe Ginsberg, Art Houtteman and Bill Wight. In the case of both Gromek and Houtteman, it was thought that a change of scenery would benefit both players as both had been inconsistent in recent years, so the two were added into the trade package.

== Detroit Tigers ==
In his first appearance upon joining his new club, Gromek allowed nine earned runs in one inning in a 23–3 blowout loss to the Boston Red Sox. Despite the poor first outing, Tigers manager Fred Hutchinson decided that the veteran Gromek's best fit would be as a starter with his staff of young pitchers. His confidence paid off, as Gromek shut out Philadelphia in his next appearance, allowing four hits and cementing his role in the starting rotation for the rest of the season. In his third start for the Tigers on July 2, he faced the Indians, and defeated the team who had traded him three weeks prior, 4–2. He ended up facing the Indians two more times, winning in August and losing in September, his final start of the year. In his first season in Detroit, Gromek went 6–8 with a 4.51 ERA in 19 games, 17 of them starts.

Hutchinson chose Gromek as his opening day starter for the 1954 season against the former St. Louis Browns in their first game as the Baltimore Orioles, using the starter with the most experience in order to get the Tigers to start the season strong; he shut them out on seven hits in a 3–0 win. After his first four games, he developed a reputation for his quick pitching, with baseball games ending half an hour earlier on average on days he pitched. On May 9, his complete game eleven inning victory over the Chicago White Sox improved Gromek's record to 5–0 with a 1.72 ERA, making him the first pitcher in the league with five wins. He also became the first to seven wins in mid-May, but then went on five-game losing streak, not winning game eight until June 15 against the Red Sox. For the season, Gromek had 18 wins, 16 losses, a 2.74 ERA, and 102 strikeouts in 252.2 innings pitched and 36 games, 32 of them starts. He led the Tigers in wins, losses, ERA, and innings pitched, and his ERA and innings pitched were both ranked fifth in the AL.

Gromek also led the AL with twelve hit batsmen in 1954. On August 29, he hit Bill Wilson in the fourth inning of a 14–3 win against the Athletics. In the ninth inning, Athletics pitcher Marion Fricano, who had a reputation as a head hunter himself (two days prior, he ended the Chicago White Sox's Cass Michaels' career with a beanball), retaliated and threw at Gromek's back. Gromek charged the mound, causing both dugouts and bullpens to empty. Both players were ejected from the game, and fined by the league. Gromek entered the 1955 season as an everyday starting pitcher, though he was not the opening day starter that year. During the offseason, he worked to lessen the control he had on the ball, as he felt his low ERA but league-leading 26 home runs allowed was the result of overly controlling the ball. He remained a starter throughout the season, with the exception of September, in which Gromek pitched three games in relief, earning two wins in the process. He finished the season with 13 wins and 10 losses and a 3.98 ERA in 28 appearances, and led the league with 26 home runs allowed for the second straight year.

He remained a starter with the Tigers to begin the 1956 season, but after struggling early in the season (he had a 1–3 record and a 6.12 ERA in his first four games) he was relegated to the bullpen. He spent most of the season in the bullpen, but due to injuries late in the season, Gromek was placed back in the starting rotation in August, getting a complete game win over the Senators in his first game back as a starter. He finished the season with a record of 8–6 and a 4.28 ERA in 40 games, 13 of them starts. Gromek was pulled in the third inning in his first start of 1957 and spent the rest of his tenure with the Tigers as a short-term reliever; in a May 2 game against the Red Sox, he was brought in solely to face one batter, Jackie Jensen. Due to arm trouble, he was released by the Tigers in August, and subsequently retired, finishing the year with a 6.08 ERA in 15 appearances.

== Later life ==
Gromek was immediately hired by the Tigers after his playing career ended to manage the Erie Sailors of the New York–Penn League. As a player-manager, the team had 53 wins and 72 losses, and Gromek pitched in 17 games for the team as well. After managing in the minors for one season, Gromek retired from the game of baseball, and worked as a car insurance sales representative. He and his wife, Jeanette, had three sons, Carl, Greg and Brian. Greg and Carl both pitched for the Florida State Seminoles baseball team, and Greg, who pitched in the Tigers' organization for four years, made the transition from infielder to pitcher after college just as his father had. In 1981, Gromek became a member of the National Polish-American Hall of Fame. He died on March 12, 2002, of complications from diabetes, a stroke and pneumonia.

== See also ==
- List of Polish Americans
