= Bob Rothel =

American baseball player (1923–1984)

- First baseman
- Born: September 17, 1923; Columbia Station, Ohio, U.S.
- Died: March 21, 1984 (aged 60); Huron, Ohio, U.S.
- Batted: Right Threw: Right

MLB debut
- April 22, 1945, for the Cleveland Indians

Last MLB appearance
- April 29, 1945, for the Cleveland Indians

MLB statistics
- Batting average: .200
- Home runs: 0
- Runs batted in: 0
- Stats at Baseball Reference

Teams
- Cleveland Indians (1945)

Robert Burton Rothel (September 17, 1923 – March 21, 1984) was an American professional baseball player. He appeared in four games for the Cleveland Indians of Major League Baseball during the 1945 season as a third baseman.

Ken Keltner, the Indians' regular third baseman, had entered the Navy in March 1945. Regular right fielder Roy Cullenbine started the first three games of the season at third, a position he hadn't played in three years, but was moved back to right field when the team called up the 21-year-old Rothel from the Wilkes-Barre Barons. Rothel, in just his second season as a professional, started four games, but got just two hits in ten at bats, although he did walk three times. On the day of Rothel's last start, Cullenbine was traded to the Detroit Tigers in return for second baseman Dutch Meyer and, more pertinently, third baseman Don Ross. Rothel was returned to Wilkes-Barre. He played just one more season in the minor leagues before his career ended.

Rothel died of a self-inflicted gunshot wound in Huron, Ohio in 1984.
