= Elmer Weingartner =

American baseball player (1918–2009)

- Shortstop
- Born: August 13, 1918; Cleveland, Ohio, U.S.
- Died: March 15, 2009 (aged 90); Elyria, Ohio, U.S.
- Batted: Right Threw: Right

MLB debut
- April 19, 1945, for the Cleveland Indians

Last MLB appearance
- September 28, 1945, for the Cleveland Indians

MLB statistics
- Batting average: .231
- Home runs: 0
- Runs batted in: 1
- Stats at Baseball Reference

Teams
- Cleveland Indians (1945)

Elmer William Weingartner (August 13, 1918 – March 15, 2009) was an American shortstop in Major League Baseball who played for the Cleveland Indians during the 1945 season. Listed at 5 ft 11 in (1.80 m), 178 lb (81 kg), Weingartner batted and threw right-handed. He was born in Cleveland, Ohio.

In his one-season career, Weingartner was a .231 hitter (9-for-39) in 20 games, including one RBI, five runs, one double and a .302 on-base percentage without home runs or stolen bases.

Weingartner died in Elyria, Ohio, at age 90.
