= Danny Reynolds (baseball) =

American baseball player (1919–2007)

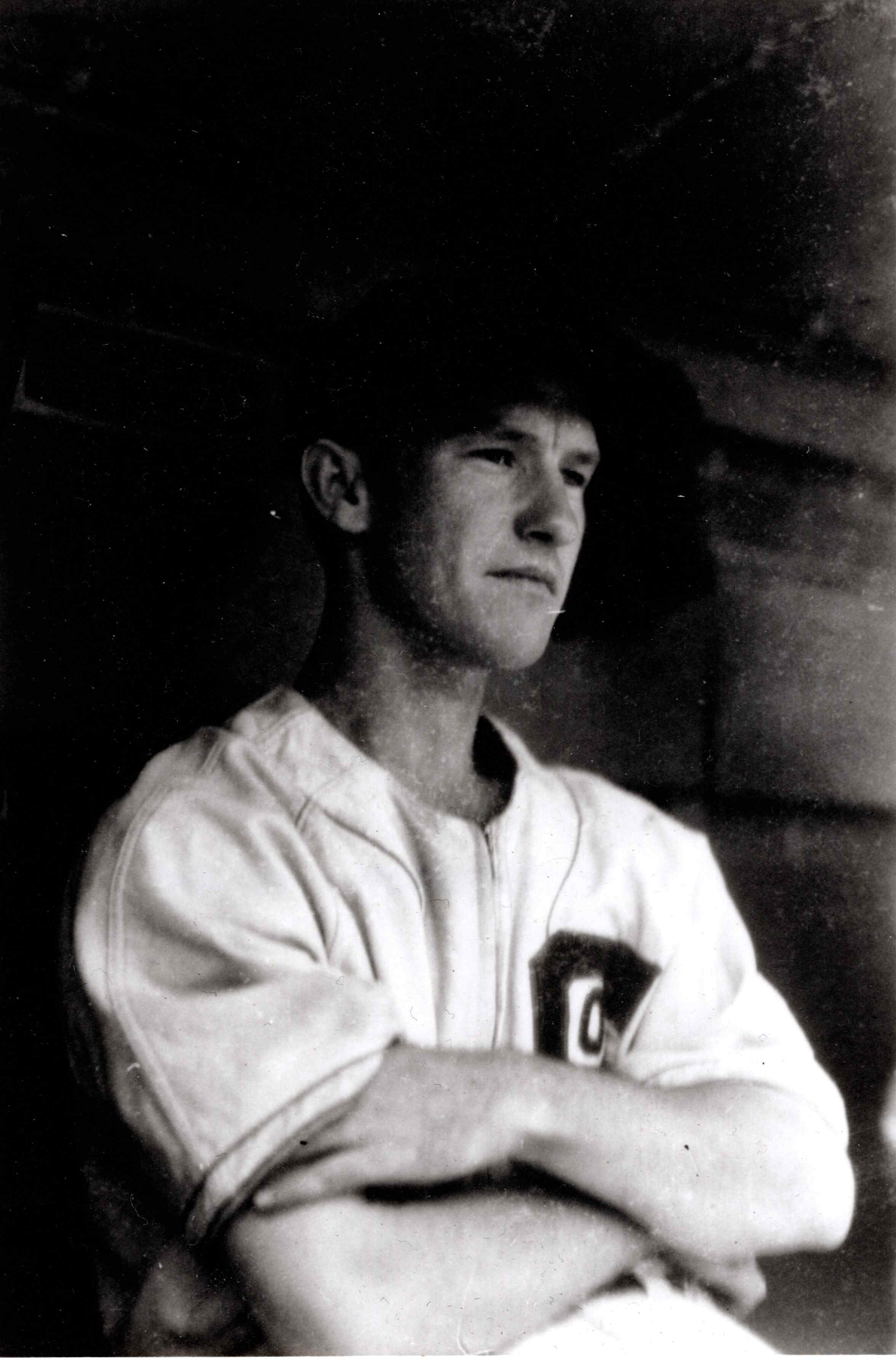
- Reynolds with the White Sox '45
- Infielder
- Born: November 26, 1919; Stony Point, North Carolina, U.S.
- Died: February 18, 2007 (aged 87); Statesville, North Carolina, U.S.
- Batted: right Threw: right

MLB debut
- May 26, 1945, for the Chicago White Sox

Last MLB appearance
- September 25, 1945, for the Chicago White Sox

MLB statistics
- Batting average: .167
- Home runs: 0
- Runs batted in: 4
- Stats at Baseball Reference

Teams
- Chicago White Sox (1945)

Daniel Vance Reynolds (November 26, 1919 – February 18, 2007) was an American shortstop/second baseman in Major League Baseball who played for the Chicago White Sox during the 1945 season. Listed at 5 ft 11 in (1.80 m), 158 lb., Reynolds batted and threw right-handed. He was born in Stony Point, North Carolina.

Reynolds, nicknamed "Squirrel", was a .167 hitter (12-for-72) with six runs and four RBI in 29 games played, including two doubles, one triple, and one stolen base. He did not hit a home run. As an infielder, he collected a .962 fielding percentage in 25 games (14 at shortstop).

Reynolds died in Statesville, North Carolina at age 87.

== Sources ==
- Career statistics from Baseball Reference · Baseball Reference (Minors) · Retrosheet · Baseball Almanac
