= Clay Touchstone =

American baseball player (1903–1949)

- Pitcher
- Born: January 24, 1903; Moore (now Prospect Park), Pennsylvania, U.S.
- Died: April 28, 1949 (aged 46); Beaumont, Texas, U.S.
- Batted: Right Threw: Right

MLB debut
- September 4, 1928, for the Boston Braves

Last MLB appearance
- September 8, 1945, for the Chicago White Sox

MLB statistics
- Win–loss record: 0–0
- Earned run average: 6.53
- Strikeouts: 6
- Stats at Baseball Reference

Teams
- Boston Braves (1928–1929); Chicago White Sox (1945)

Clayland Maffitt Touchstone (January 24, 1903 – April 28, 1949) was an American professional baseball player. He was a right-handed pitcher over parts of three seasons (1928–29, 1945) with the Boston Braves and Chicago White Sox. For his career, he did not record a decision and compiled a 6.53 earned run average with six strikeouts in 20 2/3 innings pitched.

Following the 1929 season, Touchstone played for seven seasons in the Southern Association followed by six seasons in the Texas League. His contract was sold to the International League's Baltimore Orioles before the start of the 1943 but decided to quit baseball rather than report.

In 1945, after having been out of baseball for several years, Touchstone signed with the Chicago White Sox. At the time, he was reported to be 39 years old despite actually being 42. Upon reporting to spring training, he told reporters he "suddenly got the hankering to try baseball again" and, given the shortage of able-bodied young men on the home front during World War II, "now would be the best time."

He was born in Moore (now Prospect Park), Pennsylvania and died in Beaumont, Texas, at the age of 46.
