= Joe Orengo =

American baseball player (1914–1988)

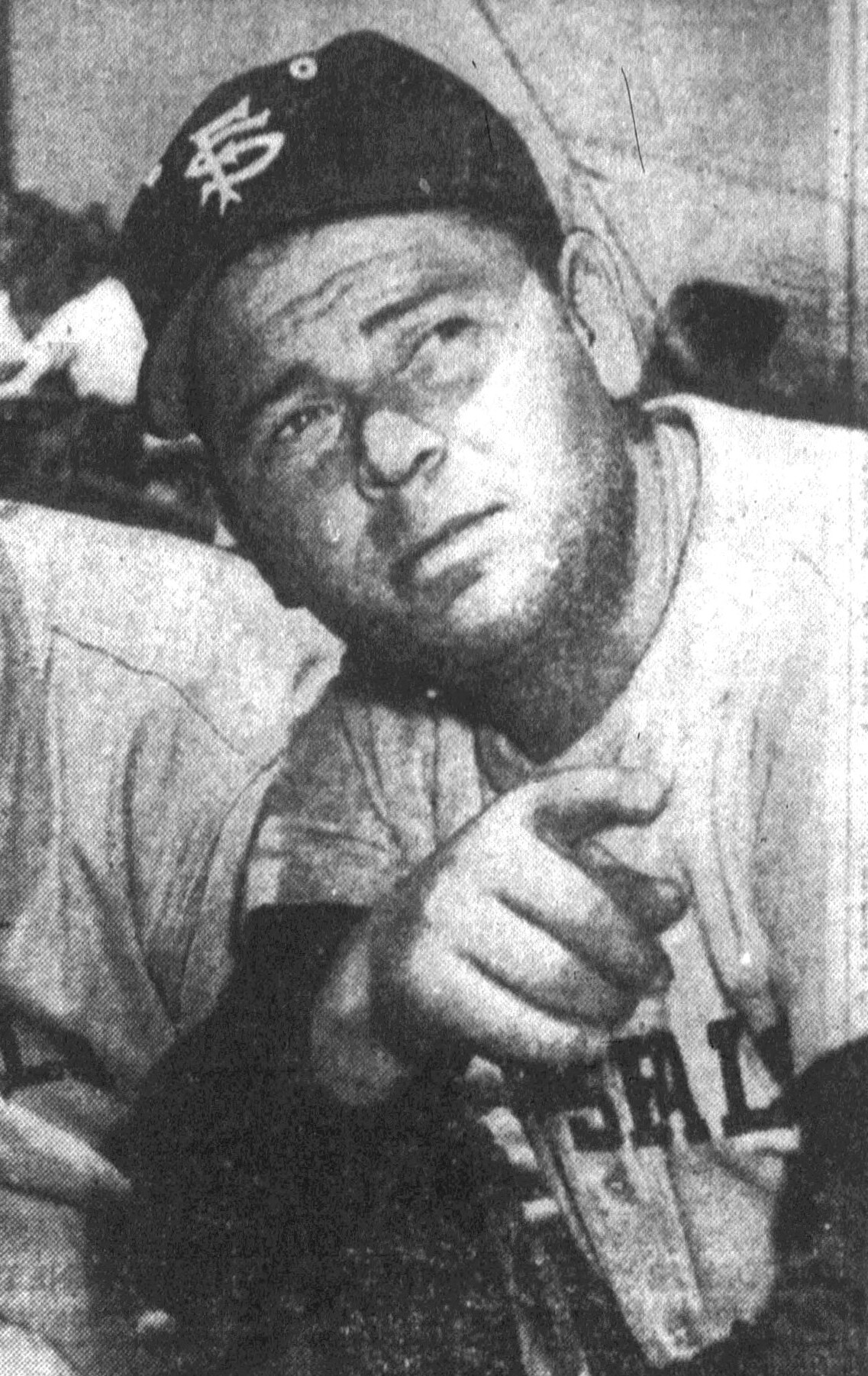
- Orengo in 1951
- Shortstop
- Born: November 29, 1914; San Francisco, California, U.S.
- Died: July 24, 1988 (aged 73); San Francisco, California, U.S.
- Batted: Right Threw: Right

MLB debut
- April 18, 1939, for the St. Louis Cardinals

Last MLB appearance
- September 25, 1945, for the Chicago White Sox

MLB statistics
- Batting average: .238
- Home runs: 17
- Runs batted in: 122
- Stats at Baseball Reference

Teams
- St. Louis Cardinals (1939–1940); New York Giants (1941, 1943); Brooklyn Dodgers (1943); Detroit Tigers (1944); Chicago White Sox (1945)

Joseph Charles Orengo (November 29, 1914 – July 24, 1988) was an American infielder in Major League Baseball who played for five teams from 1939 to 1945, playing all four infield positions. He was born in San Francisco, California, and died there at age 73.

In 366 games over six seasons, Orengo posted a .238 batting average (266-for-1120) with 129 runs, 17 home runs, 122 RBIs and 156 bases on balls. Defensively, he recorded an overall .966 fielding percentage. He was married to Alma Orengo and had 4 children.
