= Johnny Johnson (baseball) =

American baseball player (1914–1991)

- Pitcher
- Born: September 29, 1914; Belmore, Ohio, U.S.
- Died: June 26, 1991 (aged 76); Iron Mountain, Michigan, U.S.
- Batted: Left Threw: Left

MLB debut
- April 19, 1944, for the New York Yankees

Last MLB appearance
- September 25, 1945, for the Chicago White Sox

MLB statistics
- Win–loss record: 3-2
- Earned run average: 4.20
- Strikeouts: 49
- Stats at Baseball Reference

Teams
- New York Yankees (1944); Chicago White Sox (1945)

John Clifford Johnson (September 29, 1914 – June 26, 1991) was an American middle-relief pitcher in Major League Baseball who played for the New York Yankees (1944) and Chicago White Sox (1945). Listed at 6 ft 0 in (1.83 m), 182 lb., Johnson batted and threw left-handed. He was born in Belmore, Ohio.

In a two-season career, Johnson posted a 3–2 record with 49 strikeouts and a 4.20 ERA in 51 appearances, including one start, seven saves, 27 games finished, and 96 ⅓ innings.

Johnson died in Iron Mountain, Michigan, at the age of 76.

== See also ==
- Chicago White Sox all-time roster

== Sources ==
- Career statistics from Baseball Reference · Retrosheet · Baseball Almanac
- Retrosheet
