= Jim Devlin (catcher) =

American baseball player (1922–2004)

- Catcher
- Born: August 25, 1922; Plains, Pennsylvania, U.S.
- Died: January 15, 2004 (aged 81); Danville, Pennsylvania, U.S.
- Batted: Left Threw: Right

MLB debut
- April 27, 1944, for the Cleveland Indians

Last MLB appearance
- April 27, 1944, for the Cleveland Indians

MLB statistics
- Games played: 1
- Plate appearances: 1
- Hits: 0
- Stats at Baseball Reference

Teams
- Cleveland Indians (1944)

James Raymond Devlin (August 25, 1922 – January 15, 2004) was an American Major League Baseball catcher from Plains, Pennsylvania who played one season in Major League Baseball. He played for the Cleveland Indians for one game on April 27, 1944. He died in Danville, Pennsylvania.
