= Mickey Rocco =

American baseball player (1916–1997)

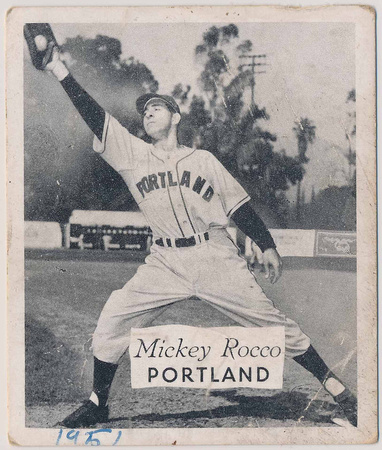
- First baseman
- Born: March 2, 1916; St. Paul, Minnesota, U.S.
- Died: June 1, 1997 (aged 81); St. Paul, Minnesota, U.S.
- Batted: Left Threw: Left

MLB debut
- June 5, 1943, for the Cleveland Indians

Last MLB appearance
- June 24, 1946, for the Cleveland Indians

MLB statistics
- Batting average: .258
- Home runs: 30
- Runs batted in: 186
- Stats at Baseball Reference

Teams
- Cleveland Indians (1943–1946)

Michael Dominick Rocco (March 2, 1916 – June 1, 1997) was an American professional baseball player. A first baseman, Rocco played in Major League Baseball (MLB) for four seasons in the American League with the Cleveland Indians. In 440 career games, Rocco recorded a batting average of .258 and accumulated 30 home runs and 186 runs batted in (RBI).

A native of Minnesota, Rocco began playing professional baseball in 1935, and played in the minor leagues for the next eight years. In June 1943, he was promoted to the Cleveland Indians, and served as the team's everyday first baseman during the war years. After the war ended, Rocco played one more season with the Indians in 1946, then returned to the minor leagues. There, he played primarily in the Pacific Coast League (PCL) until 1952, retiring after attempting to play amateur baseball in Minnesota and being ruled ineligible.

== Early life and career ==
Rocco was born on March 2, 1916. His parents emigrated from Italy. He attended Saint Paul Central High School and played for the school's baseball and basketball teams. He was also concertmaster as a violinist, and considered a career as a musician before deciding on baseball.

Rocco began his professional career in 1935 with the Portsmouth Pirates of the Middle Atlantic League; he had a batting average of .340 in 95 games. He had stints with the St. Paul Saints and the Knoxville Smokies, but spent most of the following season with Portsmouth, playing in 79 games for them and 92 games between the three teams. After another handful of games with St. Paul, Rocco spent most of 1937 with the Dallas Steers of the Texas League, where he had a .259 batting average, a .986 fielding percentage, and 22 doubles in 115 games.

In 1938, Rocco played for the Anniston Rams of the Southeastern League. Early on in the season, he was considered to be both one of the best hitters and fielders on the team, and finished the season with 14 triples in 137 games. The following year, he remained with the Rams, and finished the season with a .318 batting average, 11 triples, and 18 home runs in 142 games. Over the offseason, he married Helen Harwell. Rocco was projected to spend 1940 with the Rams again as they offered him a contract, however the Nashville Volunteers of the Southern Association offered him a contract for the season after a successful tryout, which he signed. Over the first two months of the season, Rocco had 11 home runs, which was tied for the league lead with Willard Marshall. He finished the season with a .305 batting average and 21 home runs in 148 games. After the 1940 season, Rocco was traded by Nashville to the Buffalo Bisons of the International League with Bob Boken for Les Fleming and cash; Rocco spent the next two and a half seasons with the Bisons. In 1941, Rocco hit .284 with 21 home runs and 79 RBIs, and in 1942 hit .297 with 23 home runs and 97 RBIs. After playing in 32 games for Buffalo in 1943, on June 4, 1943, the Bisons and Cleveland Indians made a trade which sent Rocco to the Indians to begin his major league career, while Eddie Turchin and Otto Denning were sent to Buffalo, ending their major league careers.

== Major league career ==
Rocco made his major league debut the following day on June 5 against the Philadelphia Athletics, hitting a double and a triple in a 6–5 loss. Highlights from his rookie year included a three-double outing against the Washington Senators on July 8, as well as nine hits in 13 at bats in a late August three-game series against the Chicago White Sox. Rocco served as the everyday first baseman throughout the season, and finished 1943 with a .240 batting average and a league-leading .995 fielding percentage in 108 games. After the season, the Indians engaged in talks with the Athletics to trade Rocco for Dick Siebert, who was unhappy in Philadelphia. The trade discussions eventually died down, however, and both players remained with their teams. Entering 1944, Rocco, who had spent the offseason working at a tavern and a war plant in St. Paul, was classified as 1-A by the Selective Service System, and was required to join the military to enlist in World War II. However, a stomach ailment caused him to be re-classified as 4-F and rejected for service, and he returned to the Indians for the 1944 Cleveland Indians season. He played in every game for the Indians that year, and ended up being inconsistent at the plate throughout the season; in July he had 13 at bats without a hit, but also had a 12-game hitting streak. Rocco led the league in putouts, assists, games played, and at bats, finishing the season with a .266 batting average, 13 home runs, and 70 RBIs.

Rocco began 1945 holding out for more money on his contract for the year, with negotiations stalled throughout the offseason. It took until early April, just before the season started, for the two sides to come to an agreement; Rocco had spent the offseason training at the University of Minnesota and as a result did not miss any playing time despite the holdout. While he played nearly every game in 1945, he was slow to start; it took seven straight hits over two games in June to keep his batting average over .200, and later that month was fined by manager Lou Boudreau for what he considered "indifferent play". On September 9, 1945, Rocco had two singles, two doubles, and two home runs in a doubleheader sweep over New York in front of a crowd of 72,252 at Yankee Stadium, which he considered the highlight of his professional baseball career. In a team-leading 143 games, he had a .264 batting average, 10 home runs, and 56 RBIs.

Entering the 1946 season, Rocco was competing with Les Fleming and Eddie Robinson for the starting first baseman job. Fleming won the job and held it, though Rocco saw occasional playing time until June 26, when he was traded with cash to the Chicago Cubs for first baseman Heinz Becker in one of new owner Bill Veeck's first moves. However, Rocco refused to report to the Nashville Volunteers, the Cubs' minor league organization, and considered quitting the game, which put the trade on hold. He eventually did report to Nashville, and finished the year having played 34 games in the majors and 37 games in the minors. After the season the Boston Red Sox signed him to a contract as a potential backup first baseman, but he did not make the cut, and was sent to the Seattle Rainiers of the Pacific Coast League just before the 1947 season started.

== Later life ==
Rocco spent the 1947 season with Seattle, hitting .300 with 18 home runs and 99 RBIs in 144 games. The following year, he joined the San Francisco Seals of the PCL. In the first week of the season, he had seven hits in 12 at bats for a batting average of .583, which helped San Francisco start the season 6–0. He finished the season with a .300 batting average, 27 home runs and 149 RBIs in 178 games, and was named to the PCL All-Star Team. He remained with San Francisco for the 1949 season, where he hit .276 with 25 home runs and 114 RBIs in 163 games. After the season, he was purchased by the Portland Beavers and competed during spring training with Vince Shupe, Portland's first baseman the previous season, for the starting first base job. Rocco won the job and held it for the year, finishing the season with a .258 batting average, 26 home runs, and 108 RBIs in 183 games. He spent the 1951 season with three teams: Portland, the St. Paul Saints, and the Kansas City Blues, and spent 1952 with St. Paul and the Springfield Cubs.

The following year, Rocco attempted to sign with Southern Minnesota Baseball League's Mankato Merchants but was ruled ineligible to play, due to a rule barring anyone who had played professionally for more than 60 days the previous year. Rocco had, so this kept him out of baseball for the year and put an end to his professional career. After retiring from professional baseball, Rocco worked for Distillers Distributing Company and coached an American Legion Baseball team in Roseville, Minnesota. He died in his hometown of St. Paul, Minnesota, on June 1, 1997, at the age of 81.
