= Oris Hockett =

American baseball player (1909–1969)

- Outfielder
- Born: September 29, 1909; Amboy, Indiana, U.S.
- Died: March 23, 1969 (aged 59); Torrance, California, U.S.
- Batted: Left Threw: Right

MLB debut
- September 4, 1938, for the Brooklyn Dodgers

Last MLB appearance
- September 7, 1945, for the Chicago White Sox

MLB statistics
- Batting average: .276
- Home runs: 13
- Runs batted in: 214
- Stats at Baseball Reference

Teams
- Brooklyn Dodgers (1938–1939); Cleveland Indians (1941–1944); Chicago White Sox (1945)

Career highlights and awards
- All-Star (1944)

Oris Leon Hockett (September 29, 1909 – March 23, 1969) was an American outfielder in Major League Baseball who played for the Brooklyn Dodgers (1938–39), Cleveland Indians (1941–44) and Chicago White Sox (1945). Hockett batted left-handed and threw right-handed. He was born in Amboy, Indiana.

In a seven-season career, Hockett was a .276 hitter with 13 home runs and 214 RBI in 551 games played.

Hockett died in Torrance, California, at age 59.

== Highlights ==
- American League All-Star team (1944)
- Finished 17th in American League MVP Award vote (1943)
