= Paul Calvert (baseball) =

Canadian baseball player (1917–1999)

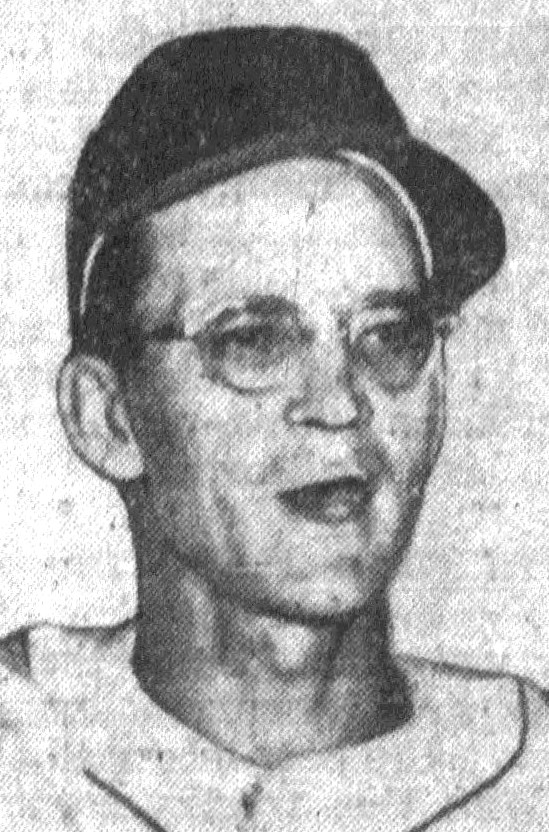
- Calvert, circa 1951
- Pitcher
- Born: October 6, 1917; Montreal, Quebec, Canada
- Died: February 1, 1999 (aged 81); Sherbrooke, Quebec, Canada
- Batted: Right Threw: Right

MLB debut
- September 24, 1942, for the Cleveland Indians

Last MLB appearance
- May 6, 1951, for the Detroit Tigers

MLB statistics
- Win–loss record: 9–22
- Earned run average: 5.31
- Strikeouts: 102
- Stats at Baseball Reference

Teams
- Cleveland Indians (1942–1945); Washington Senators (1949); Detroit Tigers (1950–1951)

Paul Léo Émile Calvert (October 6, 1917 – February 1, 1999) was a Canadian professional baseball player. He was a pitcher in Major League Baseball (MLB) for the Cleveland Indians, Washington Senators and Detroit Tigers over all or parts of seven seasons spanning 1942–51. Listed at 6 feet (1.8 metres) tall and 175 pounds (79 kg), he batted and threw right-handed. In 109 MLB games (27 as a starting pitcher) and 301 2/3 innings pitched, Calvert allowed 345 hits and 158 bases on balls. He struck out 102, threw five complete games and earned five saves.

Born in Montreal, Quebec, Calvert broke into professional baseball in 1938. He spent most of the year playing in the Quebec Provincial League, at the time a minor league unaffiliated with MLB. He then played in three games for the Montreal Royals, and showed enough promise that the New York Giants gave him a tryout, but they passed on signing him as they felt he needed more experience. After spending 1939 out of organized baseball, Calvert was signed by the Cleveland Indians organization to a contract in 1940, and was invited to spring training. He then spent the season with the Cedar Rapids Raiders of the Illinois–Indiana–Iowa League and the Wilkes-Barre Barons of the Eastern League, playing in 21 total games for the two teams. He spent 1941 with Cedar Rapids, and finished the year with six wins, three losses, and a 2.39 earned run average (ERA) in 11 games.

He signed with the Cleveland organization and in 1942 he won 17 of 24 decisions with a 2.22 ERA with Wilkes-Barre. That led to his call up to the Indians' roster when he made his MLB debut with two scoreless innings against the Chicago White Sox on September 24 in his only major league appearance of the season.

Calvert spent three full seasons—1944, 1949, and 1950—in the big leagues. His most notable campaign, 1949 with the Senators, saw him lead the American League in games lost (17) and in pitchers' fielding percentage (1.000 in 55 chances). His minor league career essentially ended after the 1952 season, although he got into three games in 1955 with the Class C Modesto Reds.
