= Paul O'Dea =

American baseball player (1920–1978)

- Outfielder / Pitcher
- Born: July 3, 1920; Cleveland, Ohio, U.S.
- Died: December 11, 1978 (aged 58); Cleveland, Ohio, U.S.
- Batted: Left Threw: Left

MLB debut
- April 19, 1944, for the Cleveland Indians

Last MLB appearance
- September 20, 1945, for the Cleveland Indians

MLB statistics
- Batting average: .272
- Home runs: 1
- Runs batted in: 34
- Stats at Baseball Reference

Teams
- Cleveland Indians (1944–1945)

Paul O'Dea (July 3, 1920 – December 11, 1978) was an American professional baseball player, manager and scout. He saw Major League service during World War II for the 1944 and 1945 Cleveland Indians. He threw and batted left-handed, stood 6 feet (1.8 m) tall and weighed 200 pounds (91 kg).

A native of Cleveland, Ohio and alumnus of Case Western Reserve University, O'Dea began his professional career with the Fargo-Moorhead Twins in 1938. He played in 62 games for the Twins and had a .362 batting average. The following season he played for the Springfield Indians, hitting .342 in 122 games, and due to his hitting the Indians brought him to spring training in 1940. During that time, he was hit in the right eye by a foul ball, causing blindness. Despite the injury, he remained in the Indians organization the next four years, and made his major league debut on April 19, 1944.

O'Dea spent the two full seasons with the 1944–1945 Indians; he was exempt from reporting to service for World War II due to his earlier eye injury. He was primarily an outfielder, but also played first base and was a left-handed pitcher. In 163 Major League games, O'Dea's career batting average was .272; in his four games on the mound, he did not earn a decision, with an earned run average was 5.68 in 61/3 innings pitched. O'Dea had a .318 batting average in 1944 in 76 games. He hit his only big-league home run off Don Black of the Philadelphia Athletics on May 19, 1945, in a 2–1 Cleveland victory at League Park. After the 1945 season ended, he was sent back to the minors, which ended his major league career.

O'Dea returned to the minor leagues and played for five more seasons, from 1946 to 1948 and from 1950 to 1951. He then served as a manager of various Indians' Class C and Class D farm system teams between 1947 and 1960. He then spent the rest of his life as a scout for the Indians, until his death at the age of 58.
