= Bill Bonness =

American baseball player (1923–1977)

- Pitcher
- Born: December 15, 1923; Cleveland, Ohio
- Died: December 3, 1977 (aged 53); Cleveland, Ohio
- Batted: Right Threw: Left

MLB debut
- September 26, 1944, for the Cleveland Indians

Last MLB appearance
- September 29, 1944, for the Cleveland Indians

MLB statistics
- Win–loss record: 0–1
- Earned run average: 7.71
- Strikeouts: 1
- Stats at Baseball Reference

Teams
- Cleveland Indians (1944)

William John Bonness (December 15, 1923 – December 3, 1977), nicknamed "Lefty", was a Major League Baseball pitcher who played for one season. He played for the Cleveland Indians from September 26, 1944, to September 29, 1944.

Bonness graduated from Lakewood High School in Ohio before breaking into professional baseball. He appeared briefly for the Indians during World War II. On Thanksgiving in 1955, he was carrying a box of tools in his home when he fell down his basement steps. He underwent brain surgery but died a few days later.
