= Ray Mack =

American baseball player (1916–1969)

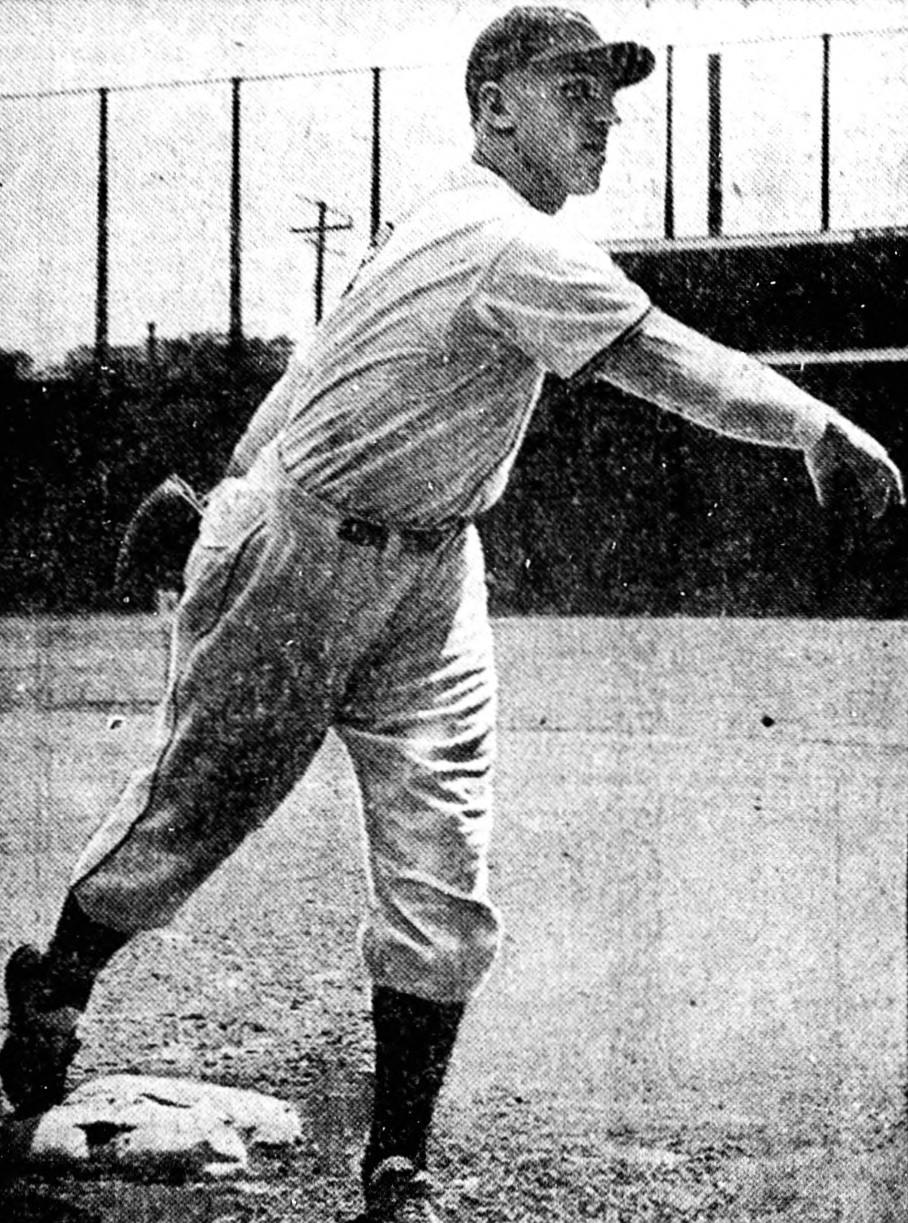
- Mack, circa 1940
- Second baseman
- Born: August 31, 1916; Cleveland, Ohio, U.S.
- Died: May 7, 1969 (aged 52); Bucyrus, Ohio, U.S.
- Batted: Right Threw: Right

MLB debut
- September 9, 1938, for the Cleveland Indians

Last MLB appearance
- September 28, 1947, for the Chicago Cubs

MLB statistics
- Batting average: .232
- Home runs: 34
- Runs batted in: 278
- Stats at Baseball Reference

Teams
- Cleveland Indians (1938–1946); New York Yankees (1947); Chicago Cubs (1947)

Career highlights and awards
- All-Star (1940)

Raymond James Mack (born Raymond James Mlckovsky, August 31, 1916 – May 7, 1969) was an American second baseman in Major League Baseball from 1938 to 1946 with the Cleveland Indians and in 1947 with the New York Yankees and Chicago Cubs. In a nine-season career, he had a batting average of .232 with 34 home runs and 278 RBIs. He stole 35 bases, scored 273 runs, and accumulated 113 doubles and 24 triples. He had 629 career hits in 2,707 at-bats.

Mack attended Case School of Applied Science, now known as Case Western Reserve University, where he was known as an outstanding football player, earning the nickname the "Case Ace." In fact, he was drafted by the Chicago Bears in the 1938 NFL draft, but declined professional football to play his passion of baseball. After playing semipro baseball, we was eventually scouted and signed by the Cleveland Indians in 1938.

Mack was born in Cleveland, Ohio. Listed as 6 feet (1.8 m) tall and 200 pounds (91 kg), he was known more for his fielding than his hitting, teaming up with Cleveland shortstop Lou Boudreau for a great double play combination in the early 1940s. Mack was selected to the 1940 American League All-Star team and pinch hit for starting second baseman Joe Gordon in the eighth inning. Mack struck out against Larry French of the Cubs and handled no chances in the field as the AL bowed, 4–0, at Sportsman's Park. Ironically, Gordon would succeed Mack as the Indians' regular second baseman in 1947.

Mack ended with a .966 career fielding percentage and helped complete 597 double plays. He saved Bob Feller's 1940 opening day no-hitter with a diving stop on the final out. After the 1946 season, Mack was traded to the Yankees by new Indians' owner Bill Veeck. It was one of many deals orchestrated by Veeck, but in it Cleveland obtained pitcher Gene Bearden, who would pitch the Tribe to the 1948 pennant as a rookie.

Mack died in Bucyrus, Ohio. His son, Tom played for the Los Angeles Rams in the National Football League and was inducted into the Pro Football Hall of Fame in 1999.
