= Jim McDonnell (baseball) =

American baseball player (1922–1993)

- Catcher
- Born: August 15, 1922; Gagetown, Michigan, U.S.
- Died: April 24, 1993 (aged 70); Detroit, Michigan, U.S.
- Batted: Left Threw: Right

MLB debut
- September 23, 1943, for the Cleveland Indians

Last MLB appearance
- September 23, 1945, for the Cleveland Indians

MLB statistics
- Batting average: .211
- Home runs: 0
- Runs batted in: 12
- Stats at Baseball Reference

Teams
- Cleveland Indians (1943–1945)

James William McDonnell (August 15, 1922 – April 24, 1993) was an American Major League Baseball catcher who played for three seasons. He played for the Cleveland Indians from 1943 to 1945, playing in 50 career games.
