= Hank Ruszkowski =

American baseball player (1925–2000)

- Catcher
- Born: November 10, 1925; Cleveland, Ohio, U.S.
- Died: May 31, 2000 (aged 74); Cleveland, Ohio, U.S.
- Batted: Right Threw: Right

MLB debut
- September 26, 1944, for the Cleveland Indians

Last MLB appearance
- September 20, 1947, for the Cleveland Indians

MLB statistics
- Batting average: .238
- Home runs: 3
- Runs batted in: 10
- Stats at Baseball Reference

Teams
- Cleveland Indians (1944–1945; 1947)

Henry Alexander Ruszkowski (November 10, 1925 – May 31, 2000) was an American professional baseball player. A catcher, he appeared in 40 Major League games over parts of three seasons for the Cleveland Indians (1944–1945; 1947). Listed at 6 ft 0 in (1.83 m), 190 pounds (86 kg), Ruszkowski batted and threw right-handed. He was born in Cleveland, Ohio.

During his Major League career, Ruszkowski was a .238 hitter (20-for-84) with three home runs, two doubles and a .310 on-base percentage. He also played seven minor league seasons between 1944 and 1954, appearing in 298 games.

Ruszkowski died in his native Cleveland at the age of 74.
