= Norm Schlueter =

American baseball player (1916–2004)

- Catcher
- Born: September 25, 1916; Belleville, Illinois, U.S.
- Died: October 6, 2004 (aged 88); Belleville, Illinois, U.S.
- Batted: Right Threw: Right

MLB debut
- May 28, 1938, for the Chicago White Sox

Last MLB appearance
- October 1, 1944, for the Cleveland Indians

MLB statistics
- Batting average: .186
- Home runs: 0
- Runs batted in: 26
- Stats at Baseball Reference

Teams
- Chicago White Sox (1938–1939); Cleveland Indians (1944)

Norman John Schlueter (September 25, 1916 – October 6, 2004) was an American professional baseball catcher who played three seasons in Major League Baseball. He played for the Chicago White Sox from 1938 to 1939 and the Cleveland Indians in 1944.
