= Myril Hoag =

American baseball player (1908–1971)

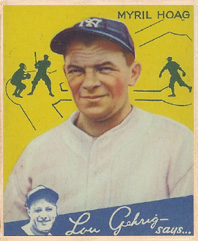
- Outfielder
- Born: March 9, 1908; Davis, California, U.S.
- Died: July 28, 1971 (aged 63); High Springs, Florida, U.S.
- Batted: Right Threw: Right

MLB debut
- April 15, 1931, for the New York Yankees

Last MLB appearance
- September 16, 1945, for the Cleveland Indians

MLB statistics
- Batting average: .271
- Home runs: 28
- Runs batted in: 401
- Stats at Baseball Reference

Teams
- New York Yankees (1931–1932, 1934–1938); St. Louis Browns (1939–1941); Chicago White Sox (1941–1942, 1944); Cleveland Indians (1944–1945)

Career highlights and awards
- All-Star (1939); 3× World Series champion (1932, 1937, 1938)

Myril Oliver Hoag (March 9, 1908 – July 28, 1971) was an American professional baseball player. An outfielder, Hoag played in Major League Baseball (MLB) for the New York Yankees, St. Louis Browns, Chicago White Sox, and Cleveland Indians between 1931 and 1945 and was on the winning team in three World Series. He appeared in the 1939 MLB All-Star Game.

== Career ==
Hoag was born in Davis, California. He played in the major leagues from April 15, 1931, until September 16, 1945. Hoag batted and threw right-handed. He had a lifetime batting average of .271 with 28 home runs and 401 RBIs.

After two seasons with the Sacramento Senators, Hoag signed with the New York Yankees after the 1930 season. He spent seven seasons with the Yankees over eight years (playing in 1933 with the Newark Bears). Hoag missed some of the 1936 season due to having a blood clot on the brain, the result of an outfield collision with teammate Joe DiMaggio.

Hoag homered for the Yankees' first run as they won the final game of the 1937 World Series. He had a .320 batting average for his three World Series.

In 1939, Hoag made the American League All-Star team with the St. Louis Browns after the Yankees traded him there for Oral Hildebrand and Buster Mills. That year, he batted .295 with 75 RBIs and 202 total bases. He was fifth in the league in stolen bases in 1942 with the Chicago White Sox with 17, nearly double his second-best season (nine in 1939).

Hoag ended his career with 854 hits in 3,147 at bats. On June 6, 1934, he collected six hits in one game in a 15–3 rout against the Red Sox, and was the last New York Yankee to accomplish this feat until Gerald Williams did so against the Baltimore Orioles on May 1, 1996.

== Personal life ==
Hoag died at his home in High Springs, Florida from an emphysema attack at the age of 63 on July 28, 1971. His grand-nephews, Max and Brock Stassi, have both played in Major League Baseball.

== See also ==
- List of Major League Baseball single-game hits leaders
