= Lou Boudreau =

American baseball player and manager (1917–2001)

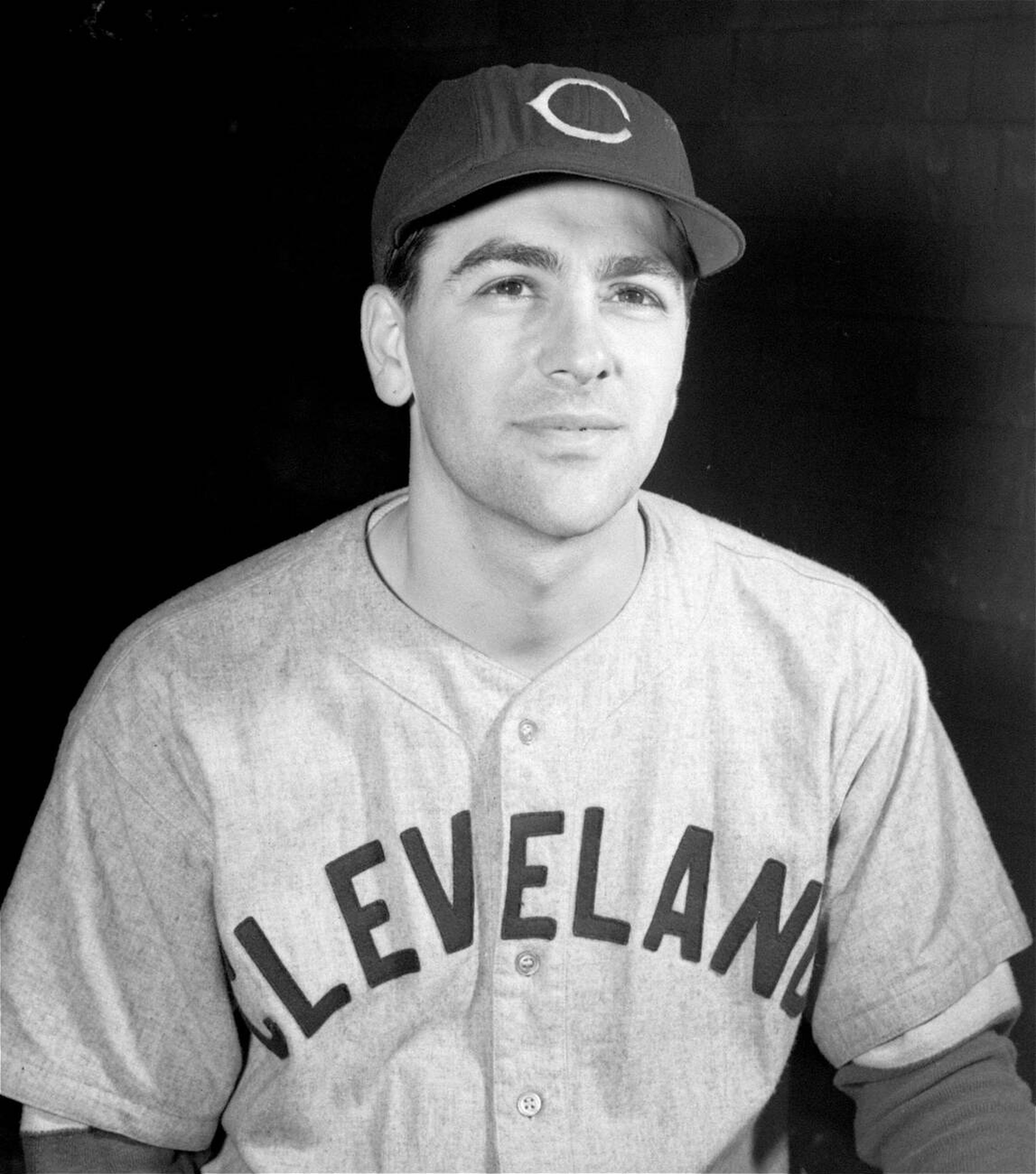
- Boudreau with the Cleveland Indians in 1942
- Shortstop / Manager
- Born: July 17, 1917; Harvey, Illinois, U.S.
- Died: August 10, 2001 (aged 84); Olympia Fields, Illinois, U.S.
- Batted: Right Threw: Right

MLB debut
- September 9, 1938, for the Cleveland Indians

Last MLB appearance
- August 24, 1952, for the Boston Red Sox

MLB statistics
- Batting average: .295
- Home runs: 68
- Runs batted in: 789
- Managerial record: 1,162–1,224
- Winning %: .487
- Stats at Baseball Reference
- Managerial record at Baseball Reference

Teams
- As player: Cleveland Indians (1938–1950); Boston Red Sox (1951–1952); As manager: Cleveland Indians (1942–1950); Boston Red Sox (1952–1954); Kansas City Athletics (1955–1957); Chicago Cubs (1960)

Career highlights and awards
- 8× All-Star (1940–1945, 1947, 1948); World Series champion (1948); AL MVP (1948); AL batting champion (1944); Cleveland Guardians No. 5 retired; Cleveland Guardians Hall of Fame; Chicago Cubs Hall of Fame

Member of the National

Baseball Hall of Fame
- Induction: 1970
- Vote: 77.3% (tenth ballot)
Basketball career
Personal information
Listed height	5 ft 11 in (1.80 m)
Listed weight	185 lb (84 kg)
Career information
High school	Thornton (Harvey, Illinois)
College	Illinois (1937–1938)
Position	Guard / forward
Career history
Playing
1938–1939	Hammond Ciesar All-Americans
Career highlights
First-team All-American – MSG (1938)

Louis Boudreau (July 17, 1917 – August 10, 2001), nicknamed "Old Shufflefoot", "Handsome Lou", and "the Good Kid", was an American professional baseball player and manager. He played in Major League Baseball (MLB) for 15 seasons, primarily as a shortstop on the Cleveland Indians, and managed four teams for 15 seasons including 10 seasons as a player-manager. He was also a radio announcer for the Chicago Cubs and in college was a dual-sport athlete in baseball and basketball, earning All-American honors in basketball for the University of Illinois.

Boudreau was an All-Star for seven seasons. (Note: MLB cancelled the 1945 All-Star Game and did not name All-Stars that season.) In 1948, Boudreau won the American League Most Valuable Player Award and managed the Cleveland Indians to the World Series title. He won the 1944 American League (AL) batting title (.327), and led the league in doubles in 1941, 1944, and 1947. He led AL shortstops in fielding eight times. Boudreau still holds the MLB record for hitting the most consecutive doubles in a game (four), set on July 14, 1946. He had the most hits (1,578) for all players in the 1940s.

In 1970, Boudreau was elected to the National Baseball Hall of Fame and his No. 5 was retired by the Indians that same year.

== Early life ==
Boudreau was born in Harvey, Illinois, the son of Birdie (Henry) and Louis Boudreau. His father was of French-Canadian ancestry, his mother was Jewish, and both of his maternal grandparents were observant Orthodox Jews with whom when he was young he celebrated Passover seders. He was raised Catholic by his father after his parents divorced. He graduated from Thornton Township High School in Harvey, Illinois, where he led the "Flying Clouds" to three straight Illinois high school championship games, winning in 1933 and finishing as runner up in 1934 and 1935.

== College baseball and basketball ==
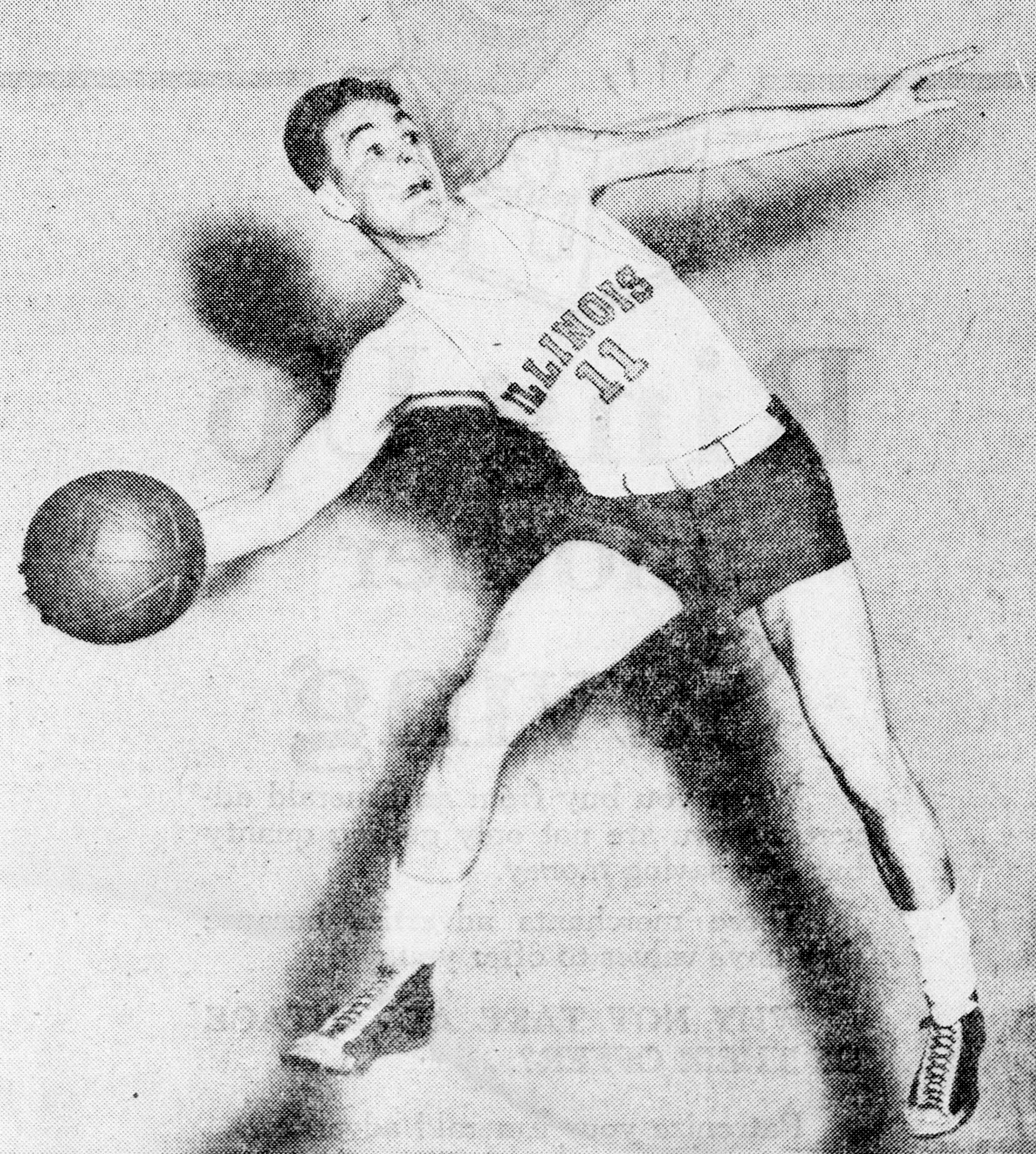
Boudreau with the Illinois Fighting Illini men's basketball team, circa 1937

Boudreau attended the University of Illinois at Urbana–Champaign, where he was a member of Phi Sigma Kappa fraternity and captain of the basketball and baseball teams. During the 1936–37 basketball and baseball seasons, Boudreau led each Fighting Illini team to a Big Ten Conference championship. During the 1937–38 basketball season, Boudreau was named an NCAA Men's Basketball All-American.

While Boudreau was still at Illinois, Cleveland Indians general manager Cy Slapnicka paid him an undisclosed sum in return for agreeing to play baseball for the Indians after he graduated. Due to this agreement, Boudreau was ruled ineligible for collegiate sports by the Big Ten Conference officials. During his senior year at Illinois, he played professional basketball with the Hammond Ciesar All-Americans of the National Basketball League.

Despite playing professional baseball with Cleveland, Boudreau earned his Bachelor of Science in education from Illinois in 1940 and worked as the Illinois freshman basketball coach for the 1939 and 1940 teams. Boudreau stayed on as an assistant coach for the 1941–42 Illinois Fighting Illini men's basketball team and he was instrumental in recruiting future Naismith Memorial Basketball Hall of Fame Inductee Andy Phillip to play for Illinois.

== Professional baseball career ==
=== Cleveland Indians ===
Boudreau made his major league debut on September 9, 1938, for the Cleveland Indians at 21 as a third baseman in his first game. In 1939, Indian manager Ossie Vitt told him that he would have to move from his normal third base position to shortstop since established slugger Ken Keltner already had the regular third base job.

In 1940, his first full year as a starter, he batted .295 with 46 doubles and 101 RBI, and was selected for the All-Star Game for the first of five consecutive seasons (MLB cancelled the 1945 game due to war-time travel restrictions and did not name All-Stars).

Boudreau helped make history in 1941 as a key figure in stopping the 56-game hitting streak by Joe DiMaggio. After two sparkling stops by Keltner at third base on hard ground balls earlier in the game, Boudreau snagged a bad-hop grounder to short barehanded and started a double play retiring DiMaggio at first. He finished the season with a modest .257 batting average, but had a league-leading 45 doubles.

After the 1941 season, owner Alva Bradley promoted Indians manager Roger Peckinpaugh to general manager and appointed the 24-year-old Boudreau player-manager. Boudreau played and managed the Indians throughout World War II (playing basketball had put a strain on Boudreau's ankles that turned into arthritis, which classified him as 4-F and thus ineligible for military service). In 1944, Boudreau turned 134 double plays, the most ever by a player-manager in MLB history. When he bought the Indians in 1947, Bill Veeck, after being approached by Boudreau, renewed the player-manager agreement with mixed feelings on both sides, as Boudreau stated that he would rather be traded than only play shortstop. Details of possibly trading him for Vern Stephens of the St. Louis Browns in 1947 only attracted fans to the side of Boudreau. However, Boudreau hit .355 in 1948; Cleveland won the AL pennant and the World Series, the Indians first World Series championship in 28 years and only the second in Indians history, with Veeck and Boudreau publicly acknowledging each other's role in the team's success.

=== Later career ===
Boudreau was released by the Indians as both player and manager following the 1950 season. He signed with the Boston Red Sox, playing full-time in 1951, moving up to player-manager in 1952 and managing from the bench in 1953–54. He then became the first manager of the Kansas City Athletics in 1955 after their move from Philadelphia until he was fired after 104 games in 1957 and replaced by Harry Craft. He last managed the Chicago Cubs, in 1960.

=== Managerial record ===
Team	Year	Regular season					Postseason			
Team	Year	Games	Won	Lost	Win %	Finish	Won	Lost	Win %	Result
CLE	1942	154	75	79	.487	4th in AL	–	–	–	–
CLE	1943	153	82	71	.536	3rd in AL	–	–	–	–
CLE	1944	154	72	82	.468	6th in AL	–	–	–	–
CLE	1945	145	73	72	.503	5th in AL	–	–	–	–
CLE	1946	154	68	86	.442	6th in AL	–	–	–	–
CLE	1947	154	80	74	.519	4th in AL	–	–	–	–
CLE	1948	155	97	58	.626	1st in AL	4	2	.667	Won World Series (BSN)
CLE	1949	154	89	65	.578	3rd in AL	–	–	–	–
CLE	1950	154	92	62	.597	4th in AL	–	–	–	–
CLE total		1377	728	649	.529		4	2	.667	
BOS	1952	154	76	78	.494	6th in AL	–	–	–	–
BOS	1953	153	84	69	.549	4th in AL	–	–	–	–
BOS	1954	154	69	85	.448	4th in AL	–	–	–	–
BOS total		461	229	232	.497		0	0	–	
KC	1955	154	61	93	.396	6th in AL	–	–	–	–
KC	1956	154	52	102	.338	8th in AL	–	–	–	–
KC	1957	103	36	67	.350	fired	–	–	–	–
KC total		411	151	260	.367		0	0	–	
CHC	1960	137	54	83	.394	7th in NL	–	–	–	–
CHC total		137	54	83	.394		0	0	–	
Total		2386	1162	1224	.487		4	2	.667	

== Boudreau shift ==
Boudreau is credited with inventing the infield shift, which came to be known colloquially as the "Boudreau shift." Because slugging Red Sox superstar Ted Williams was a dead-pull hitter, he moved most of his Cleveland Indian fielders to the right of second base against the Splendid Splinter, leaving only the third baseman and left fielder to the left of second but also very close to second base, far to the right of their normal positions. With characteristic stubborn pride, Williams refused the obvious advice from teammates to hit or bunt to left against the Boudreau shift, but great hitter that he was, not changing his approach against the shift didn't affect his hitting very much.

Boudreau later admitted that the shift was more about "psyching out" Williams rather than playing him to pull. "I always considered the Boudreau shift a psychological, rather than a tactical" ploy, he declared in his autobiography Player-Manager.

== Broadcasting ==
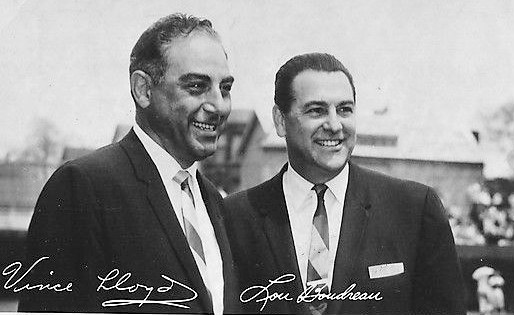
Cubs broadcasters, July 13, 1965 – Vince Lloyd and Lou Boudreau

Boudreau did play-by-play for Cub games in 1958–59 before switching roles with manager "Jolly Cholly" Charlie Grimm in 1960. But after only one season as Cubs manager, Boudreau returned to the radio booth and remained there until 1987. He also did radio play-by-play for the Chicago Bulls in 1966–1968 and worked on Chicago Blackhawks games for WGN radio and television as well.

The presence of a Hall of Fame announcer affected at least one game. On June 23, 1976, the Cubs were two runs behind at home in the fourth inning of the second game of a doubleheader against the Pittsburgh Pirates at home when the umpires called the game on account of darkness (since there were no lights at Wrigley Field until 1988), announcing that the game would be resumed at the same point the next day as was normally the case in those days. But Boudreau knew the rules better than anyone else in the park, it turned out, for he went down quickly to the clubhouse and pointed out to the umpires that a game that was not yet an official game could not be treated as a suspended game (i.e., it had not gone five innings, or four and a half with the home team leading, as neither was the case), and as such had to be replayed from the first pitch (as was then the rule in a rain-out). The umpires called the National League office, found Boudreau was correct, and removed the two-run Cubs deficit.

== Later life and honors ==
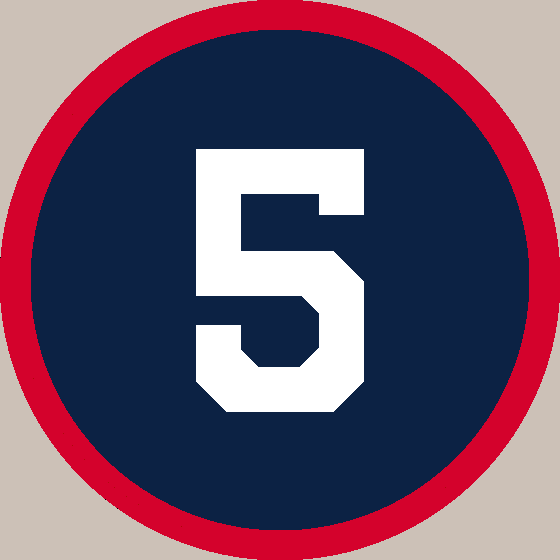
Lou Boudreau's number 5 was retired by the Cleveland Indians in 1970.

Boudreau was elected to the Baseball Hall of Fame in 1970 with 77.33% of the vote. That same year, his uniform number 5 was retired by the Cleveland Indians (he wore number 4 with the Red Sox). In 1973, the city of Cleveland renamed a street bordering Cleveland Municipal Stadium after Boudreau. Boudreau Drive in Urbana, Illinois, is also named after Boudreau.

In 1990, the Cleveland Indians established The Lou Boudreau Award, which is given every year to the organization's Minor League Player of the Year. In 1992, Boudreau's number 5 jersey was retired by the Illinois Fighting Illini baseball program. Boudreau is only one of three Illinois Fighting Illini athletes to have their number retired; the other two athletes being Illinois Fighting Illini football players Red Grange and Dick Butkus.

== Personal life ==
Boudreau married Della DeRuiter in 1938, and together they had four children. His daughter Sharyn married Denny McLain, a former star pitcher with the Detroit Tigers who was the last 30-game winner in the major leagues (31–6 for the world champion 1968 Detroit Tigers).

Boudreau had a home in Frankfort, Illinois, for many years. He died on August 10, 2001, due to cardiac arrest at St. James Medical Center in Olympia Fields, Illinois. He was 84. He received a Catholic funeral and his body was interred in the Pleasant Hill Cemetery.

== See also ==
- List of Major League Baseball batting champions
- List of Major League Baseball annual doubles leaders
- List of Major League Baseball player-managers
- List of Major League Baseball managerial wins and winning percentage leaders
