= 1945 Boston Red Sox season =

Major League Baseball season

1945 Boston Red Sox
- League: American League
- Ballpark: Fenway Park
- City: Boston, Massachusetts
- Record: 71–83 (.461)
- League place: 7th
- Owners: Tom Yawkey
- President: Tom Yawkey
- General managers: Eddie Collins
- Managers: Joe Cronin
- Radio: WNAC (Jim Britt, Tom Hussey, George Hartrick)
- Stats: ESPN.com; Baseball Reference

The 1945 Boston Red Sox season was the 45th season in the franchise's Major League Baseball history. The Red Sox finished seventh in the American League (AL) with a record of 71 wins and 83 losses, 17 1/2 games behind the Detroit Tigers, who went on to win the 1945 World Series.

== Offseason ==
- Prior to 1945 season: Tom Poholsky was signed as an amateur free agent by the Red Sox.
- November 13, 1944: The Athletics sell catcher Bob Garbark to the Louisville Colonels for an undisclosed sum.

== Regular season ==
- April 1945: At the urging of Boston City Councillor Isadore H. Y. Muchnick and with the active involvement of noted African American journalist Wendell Smith, General Manager Eddie Collins allowed three players from the Negro leagues to try out for the Red Sox. The players included Sam Jethroe from the Cleveland Buckeyes, Marvin Williams from the Philadelphia Stars, and Jackie Robinson from the Kansas City Monarchs.
- August 14, 1945: Handicapped Washington Senators coach Bert Shepard pitched in a game against the Red Sox. Shepard, who had an artificial leg, managed to give up only one run in five innings to the Red Sox.

=== Transactions ===
- May 25: The Chicago Cubs claim outfielder Lloyd Christopher off of waivers from the Red Sox.
- May 28: The Cincinnati Reds claim pitcher Joe Bowman off of waivers from the Red Sox.
- May 31: The Philadelphia Phillies claim pitcher Oscar Judd off of waivers from the Red Sox.
- June 16: Dolph Camilli announces that he has signed for the Red Sox to play as first baseman.
- July 27: The St. Louis Browns purchase Lou Finney from the Red Sox.

=== Season standings ===
American League
Team	W	L	Pct.	GB	Home	Road
Detroit Tigers	88	65	.575	—	50‍–‍26	38‍–‍39
Washington Senators	87	67	.565	1½	46‍–‍31	41‍–‍36
St. Louis Browns	81	70	.536	6	47‍–‍27	34‍–‍43
New York Yankees	81	71	.533	6½	48‍–‍28	33‍–‍43
Cleveland Indians	73	72	.503	11	44‍–‍33	29‍–‍39
Chicago White Sox	71	78	.477	15	44‍–‍29	27‍–‍49
Boston Red Sox	71	83	.461	17½	42‍–‍35	29‍–‍48
Philadelphia Athletics	52	98	.347	34½	39‍–‍35	13‍–‍63

=== Record vs. opponents ===
1945 American League record Sources:
Team	BOS	CWS	CLE	DET	NYY	PHA	SLB	WSH
Boston	—	9–13	11–11	12–10–1	6–16	14–8	8–14–1	11–11–1
Chicago	13–9	—	11–8–1	10–12	9–12	12–10	8–13	8–14
Cleveland	11–11	8–11–1	—	11–11	12–9	12–6–1	11–10	8–14
Detroit	10–12–1	12–10	11–11	—	15–7	15–7–1	15–6	10–12
New York	16–6	12–9	9–12	7–15	—	16–6	7–15	14–8
Philadelphia	8–14	10–12	6–12–1	7–15–1	6–16	—	10–12–1	5–17
St. Louis	14–8–1	13–8	10–11	6–15	15–7	12–10–1	—	11–11–1
Washington	11–11–1	14–8	14–8	12–10	8–14	17–5	11–11–1	—

=== Opening Day lineup ===
16	Ben Steiner	2B
2	Catfish Metkovich	1B
15	Pete Fox	RF
8	Bob Johnson	LF
4	Joe Cronin	3B
11	Leon Culberson	CF
6	Skeeter Newsome	SS
26	Fred Walters	C
31	Rex Cecil	P

=== Roster ===
1945 Boston Red Sox
Roster
Pitchers: 17 Frank Barrett; 28 Joe Bowman; 31 Rex Cecil; 19 Otey Clark; 29 Clem Dreisewerd; 33 Dave Ferriss; 21 Clem Hausmann; 37 Randy Heflin; 34 Vic Johnson; 29 Oscar Judd; 15 Emmett O'Neill; 20 Mike Ryba; 18 Yank Terry; 16 Jim Wilson; 10 Pinky Woods	Catchers: 27 Bob Garbark; 23 Billy Holm; 2 Frankie Pytlak; 16 Red Steiner; 26 Fred Walters; Infielders: 5 Jim Bucher; 28 Dolph Camilli; 4 Joe Cronin; 1 Ty LaForest; 7 Eddie Lake; 2 Catfish Metkovich; 6 Skeeter Newsome; 19 Nick Polly; 16 Ben Steiner; 3 Johnny Tobin	Outfielders: 35 Loyd Christopher; 11 Leon Culberson; 12 Pete Fox; 8 Bob Johnson; 14 Johnny Lazor; 25 Tom McBride; Other batters: 8 Lou Finney	Manager: 4 Joe Cronin; Coaches: 30 Del Baker (Third base); 32 Tom Daly; 22 Larry Woodall (First base)

== Player stats ==
=== Batting ===
==== Starters by position ====
Note: Pos = Position; G = Games played; AB = At bats; H = Hits; Avg. = Batting average; HR = Home runs; RBI = Runs batted in

Pos	Player	G	AB	H	Avg.	HR	RBI
C	Bob Garbark	68	199	52	.261	0	17
1B	George Metkovich	138	539	140	.260	5	62
2B	Skeeter Newsome	125	438	127	.290	1	48
SS	Eddie Lake	133	473	132	.279	11	51
3B	Jackie Tobin	84	278	70	.252	0	21
OF	Leon Culberson	97	331	91	.275	6	45
OF	Johnny Lazor	101	335	104	.310	5	45
OF	Bob Johnson	143	529	148	.280	12	74

==== Other batters ====
Note: G = Games played; AB = At bats; H = Hits; Avg. = Batting average; HR = Home runs; RBI = Runs batted in

Player	G	AB	H	Avg.	HR	RBI
Tom McBride	100	344	105	.305	1	47
Ben Steiner	78	304	78	.257	3	20
Pete Fox	66	208	51	.245	0	20
Ty LaForest	52	204	51	.250	2	16
Dolph Camilli	63	198	42	.212	2	19
Jim Bucher	52	151	34	.225	0	11
Billy Holm	58	135	25	.185	0	9
Fred Walters	40	93	16	.172	0	5
Red Steiner	26	59	12	.203	0	4
Frankie Pytlak	9	17	2	.118	0	0
Loyd Christopher	8	14	4	.286	0	4
Joe Cronin	3	8	3	.375	0	1
Nick Polly	4	7	1	.143	0	1
Lou Finney	2	2	0	.000	0	0

=== Pitching ===
==== Starting pitchers ====
Note: G = Games pitched; IP = Innings pitched; W = Wins; L = Losses; ERA = Earned run average; SO = Strikeouts

Player	G	IP	W	L	ERA	SO
Dave Ferriss	35	264.2	21	10	2.96	94
Jim Wilson	23	144.1	6	8	3.30	50
Emmett O'Neill	24	141.2	8	11	5.15	55
Randy Heflin	20	102.0	4	10	4.06	39
Otey Clark	12	82.0	4	4	3.07	20
Rex Cecil	7	45.0	2	5	5.20	30
Joe Bowman	3	11.2	0	2	9.26	0
Clem Dreisewerd	2	9.2	0	1	4.66	3

==== Other pitchers ====
Note: G = Games pitched; IP = Innings pitched; W = Wins; L = Losses; ERA = Earned run average; SO = Strikeouts

Player	G	IP	W	L	ERA	SO
Clem Hausmann	31	125.0	5	7	5.04	30
Mike Ryba	34	123.0	7	6	2.49	44
Pinky Woods	24	107.1	4	7	4.19	36
Vic Johnson	26	85.1	6	4	4.01	21
Yank Terry	12	56.2	0	4	4.13	28
Oscar Judd	2	6.1	0	1	8.53	5

==== Relief pitchers ====
Note: G = Games pitched; W = Wins; L = Losses; SV = Saves; ERA = Earned run average; SO = Strikeouts

Player	G	W	L	SV	ERA	SO
Frank Barrett	37	4	3	3	2.62	35

== Farm system ==
Level	Team	League	Manager
AA	Louisville Colonels	American Association	Nemo Leibold
A	Scranton Red Sox	Eastern League	Elmer Yoter
B	Roanoke Red Sox	Piedmont League	Eddie Popowski
C	Durham Bulls	Carolina League	Floyd "Pat" Patterson

LEAGUE CHAMPIONS: Louisville
