= 1945 Philadelphia Athletics season =

1945 Philadelphia Athletics
- League: American League
- Ballpark: Shibe Park
- City: Philadelphia
- Record: 52–98 (.347)
- League place: 8th
- Owners: Connie Mack
- Managers: Connie Mack
- Radio: WIBG (By Saam, Claude Haring, Doug Arthur)

The 1945 Philadelphia Athletics season involved the A's finishing eighth in the American League with a record of 52 wins and 98 losses.

== Regular season ==
=== Season standings ===
American League
Team	W	L	Pct.	GB	Home	Road
Detroit Tigers	88	65	.575	—	50‍–‍26	38‍–‍39
Washington Senators	87	67	.565	1½	46‍–‍31	41‍–‍36
St. Louis Browns	81	70	.536	6	47‍–‍27	34‍–‍43
New York Yankees	81	71	.533	6½	48‍–‍28	33‍–‍43
Cleveland Indians	73	72	.503	11	44‍–‍33	29‍–‍39
Chicago White Sox	71	78	.477	15	44‍–‍29	27‍–‍49
Boston Red Sox	71	83	.461	17½	42‍–‍35	29‍–‍48
Philadelphia Athletics	52	98	.347	34½	39‍–‍35	13‍–‍63

=== Record vs. opponents ===
1945 American League record Sources:
Team	BOS	CWS	CLE	DET	NYY	PHA	SLB	WSH
Boston	—	9–13	11–11	12–10–1	6–16	14–8	8–14–1	11–11–1
Chicago	13–9	—	11–8–1	10–12	9–12	12–10	8–13	8–14
Cleveland	11–11	8–11–1	—	11–11	12–9	12–6–1	11–10	8–14
Detroit	10–12–1	12–10	11–11	—	15–7	15–7–1	15–6	10–12
New York	16–6	12–9	9–12	7–15	—	16–6	7–15	14–8
Philadelphia	8–14	10–12	6–12–1	7–15–1	6–16	—	10–12–1	5–17
St. Louis	14–8–1	13–8	10–11	6–15	15–7	12–10–1	—	11–11–1
Washington	11–11–1	14–8	14–8	12–10	8–14	17–5	11–11–1	—

=== Notable transactions ===
- May 29, 1945: Frankie Hayes was traded by the Athletics to the Cleveland Indians for Buddy Rosar.
- June 15, 1945: Al Simmons was released by the Athletics.

=== Roster ===
1945 Philadelphia Athletics
Roster
Pitchers: 20 Joe Berry; 21 Don Black; 11 Charlie Bowles; 17 Russ Christopher; -- Bill Connelly; 23 Woody Crowson; 19 Jesse Flores; -- Dick Fowler; 3 Charlie Gassaway; 18 Steve Gerkin; 30 Lou Knerr; 23 Phil Marchildon; 16 Bobo Newsom; 24 Carl Scheib	Catchers: -- Joe Astroth; 8 Greek George; 8 Frankie Hayes; 9 Jim Pruett; 9 Buddy Rosar; Infielders: -- Al Brancato; 2 Ed Busch; 6 Irv Hall; 7 George Kell; 5 Dick Siebert; 22 Bobby Wilkins	Outfielders: 13 Joe Burns; 10 Sam Chapman; 25 Joe Cicero; 31 Larry Drake; 4 Bobby Estalella; 3 Ford Garrison; 12 Ernie Kish; 14 Bill McGhee; 15 Charlie Metro; 1,3 Hal Peck; 12,33 Larry Rosenthal; 10 Mayo Smith	Manager: Connie Mack; Coaches: 26 Earle Brucker; 29 Dave Keefe; 27 Earle Mack; 32 Al Simmons

== Player stats ==
=== Batting ===
==== Starters by position ====
Note: Pos = Position; G = Games played; AB = At bats; H = Hits; Avg. = Batting average; HR = Home runs; RBI = Runs batted in

Pos	Player	G	AB	H	Avg.	HR	RBI
C	Buddy Rosar	92	300	63	.210	1	25
1B	Dick Siebert	147	573	153	.267	7	51
2B	Irv Hall	151	616	161	.261	0	50
SS	Ed Busch	126	416	104	.250	0	35
3B	George Kell	147	567	154	.272	4	56
OF	Hal Peck	112	449	124	.276	5	39
OF	Bobby Estalella	126	451	135	.299	8	52
OF	Mayo Smith	73	203	43	.212	0	11

==== Other batters ====
Note: G = Games played; AB = At bats; H = Hits; Avg. = Batting average; HR = Home runs; RBI = Runs batted in

Player	G	AB	H	Avg.	HR	RBI
Bill McGhee	93	250	63	.252	0	19
Charlie Metro	65	200	42	.210	3	15
Bobby Wilkins	62	154	40	.260	0	4
Greek George	51	138	24	.174	0	11
Frankie Hayes	32	110	25	.227	3	14
Ernie Kish	43	110	27	.245	0	10
Joe Burns	31	90	23	.256	0	3
Larry Rosenthal	28	75	15	.200	0	5
Al Brancato	10	34	4	.118	0	0
Sam Chapman	9	30	6	.200	0	1
Ford Garrison	6	23	7	.304	1	6
Joe Cicero	12	19	3	.158	0	0
Joe Astroth	10	17	1	.059	0	1
Jim Pruett	6	9	2	.222	0	0
Larry Drake	1	2	0	.000	0	0

=== Pitching ===
==== Starting pitchers ====
Note: G = Games pitched; IP = Innings pitched; W = Wins; L = Losses; ERA = Earned run average; SO = Strikeouts

Player	G	IP	W	L	ERA	SO
Bobo Newsom	36	257.1	8	20	3.29	127
Russ Christopher	33	227.1	13	13	3.17	100
Jesse Flores	29	191.1	7	10	3.43	52
Don Black	26	125.1	5	11	5.17	47

==== Other pitchers ====
Note: G = Games pitched; IP = Innings pitched; W = Wins; L = Losses; ERA = Earned run average; SO = Strikeouts

Player	G	IP	W	L	ERA	SO
Lou Knerr	27	130.0	5	11	4.22	41
Charlie Gassaway	24	118.0	4	7	3.74	50
Steve Gerkin	21	102.0	0	12	3.62	25
Dick Fowler	7	37.1	1	2	4.82	21
Charlie Bowles	8	33.1	0	3	5.13	11
Phil Marchildon	3	9.0	0	1	4.00	2
Bill Connelly	2	8.0	1	1	4.50	0

==== Relief pitchers ====
Note: G = Games pitched; W = Wins; L = Losses; SV = Saves; ERA = Earned run average; SO = Strikeouts

Player	G	W	L	SV	ERA	SO
Joe Berry	52	8	7	5	2.35	51
Carl Scheib	4	0	0	0	3.12	2
Woody Crowson	1	0	0	0	6.00	2

== Farm system ==
Level	Team	League	Manager
AA	Toronto Maple Leafs	International League	Harry Davis
B	Lancaster Red Roses	Interstate League	Lena Blackburne
C	Martinsville Athletics	Carolina League	Heinie Manush
D	Lexington A's	North Carolina State League	Jimmy Maus

LEAGUE CHAMPIONS: Lancaster
