= Mayo Smith =

American baseball player and manager (1915–1977)

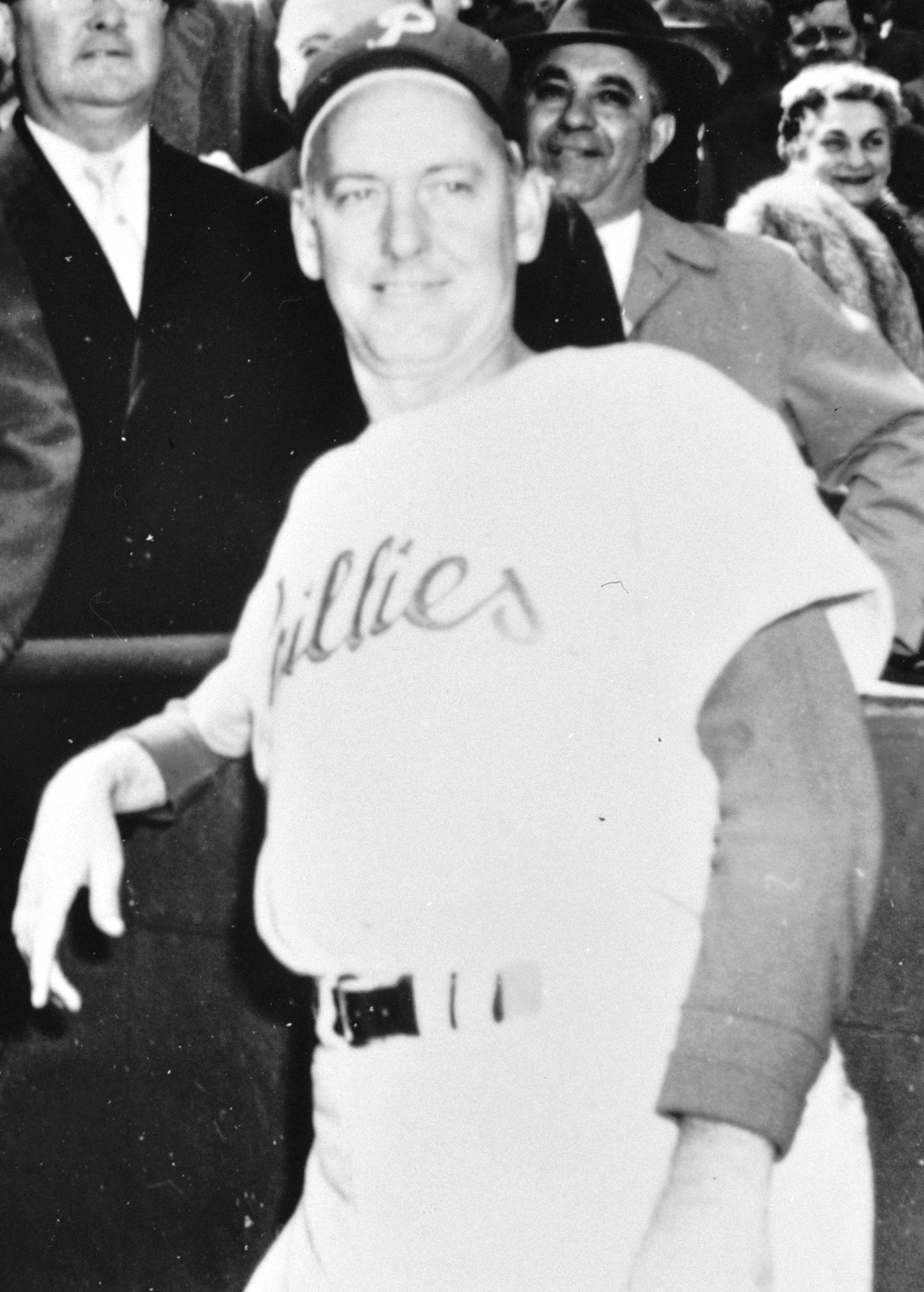
- Smith with the Philadelphia Phillies in 1957
- Outfielder / Manager
- Born: January 17, 1915; New London, Missouri, U.S.
- Died: November 24, 1977 (aged 62); Boynton Beach, Florida, U.S.
- Batted: Left Threw: Right

MLB debut
- June 24, 1945, for the Philadelphia Athletics

Last MLB appearance
- September 27, 1945, for the Philadelphia Athletics

MLB statistics
- Batting average: .212
- Hits: 43
- Runs batted in: 11
- Games managed: 1,279
- Managerial record: 662–612
- Winning %: .520
- Stats at Baseball Reference
- Managerial record at Baseball Reference

Teams
- As player: Philadelphia Athletics (1945); As manager: Philadelphia Phillies (1955–1958); Cincinnati Reds (1959); Detroit Tigers (1967–1970)

Career highlights and awards
- World Series champion (1968)

Edward Mayo "Catfish" Smith (January 17, 1915 – November 24, 1977) was an American professional baseball player, manager, and scout who played in Major League Baseball (MLB) for the 1945 Philadelphia Athletics. Smith had a 39-year baseball career from 1933 to 1971. He is also the namesake of the "Mayo Smith Society", the Detroit Tigers international fan club that awards the "King Tiger Award," each year.

Smith served as the manager of the Philadelphia Phillies (1955–1958), Cincinnati Reds (1959), and Detroit Tigers (1967–1970), compiling a managerial record of 662–612 (.520). He received The Sporting News Manager of the Year Award in 1968 after the Tigers won the American League (AL) pennant by 12 games with a record of 103–59 (.636) and defeated the St. Louis Cardinals in the 1968 World Series. ESPN has ranked Smith's decision to move Mickey Stanley to shortstop for the 1968 World Series as the third "gutsiest call" in sports history.

Smith also played professional baseball for 18 seasons from 1933 to 1950, including one season in MLB, with the 1945 Philadelphia Athletics. He spent his most productive years in the International League playing for the Toronto Maple Leafs (1937–1939) and Buffalo Bisons (1940–1944) and in the Pacific Coast League with the Portland Beavers (1946–1948). Smith also spent 13 years in the New York Yankees organization as a minor league manager from 1949 to 1954 and as a "super scout" and "trouble shooter" from 1959 to 1966.

== Early years ==
Smith was born on January 17, 1915, at New London, Missouri, a small town located 10 miles (16 km) south of Hannibal and 100 miles (160 km) northwest of St. Louis. He was the only child of George Frederick Smith and Eval Smith. His middle name, "Mayo", was reportedly bestowed by his grandmother, who had been a patient at the Mayo Clinic and "liked the name." In 1920, the family lived in Saverton Township, Ralls County, Missouri, where George Frederick was a farmer.

In 1926, at age 11, Smith moved with his family to Lake Worth in Palm Beach County, Florida. In Florida, Smith's father was employed as a butcher or "meat cutter" in a meat market, and his mother was employed as a sales lady in a "dry goods" store.

Smith attended Lake Worth High School where he was the captain of the football and basketball teams and the class president in his sophomore and senior years. He graduated from high school in 1932 and was selected as the "outstanding boy student" in Palm Beach County.

Because Smith's high school did not have a baseball team, he played as a third baseman for a semi-pro Elks team in the Palm Beach County League. According to another source, Smith was a member of the Carl Vogel Post 47, Junior Legion All-Stars in 1929. In any event, Smith was forced to stop playing semi-pro baseball after school officials threatened to expel him if he continued.

Smith was also an outstanding golfer and billiards player, playing professional billiards at age 16. He played in several exhibitions against Ralph Greenleaf and William Hoppe, the billiards champions of the 1920s and 1930s. During his youth, he reportedly picked up extra cash as a pool hustler. While playing professional baseball in Buffalo in the 1940s, a local radio broadcaster challenged Smith to a game of billiards. On his first turn, Smith "broke up the rack and ran 28 points."

== Playing career ==
=== Toronto Maple Leafs ===
In 1933, at age 18, Smith signed with the Double-A Toronto Maple Leafs of the International League. He was discovered by Toronto manager Dan Howley, who spent his winters in Palm Beach. Howley assigned Sam Rice, a veteran outfielder and future Baseball Hall of Fame inductee, to train Smith as an outfielder. Smith recalled, "After that, I was more an outfielder than third baseman." Smith managed only three hits in 29 at bats for Toronto during the 1933 season.

In 1934, Smith was assigned to the Class B Wilmington Pirates of the Piedmont League. He played the entire 1934 season for Wilmington, though he was called up by the Maple Leafs in September 1934.

In 1935, Smith appeared briefly with the Maple Leafs, having two hits in 11 at bats. He spent most of the 1935 season with Wilmington. He compiled a .315 batting average with 102 total bases in 254 at bats at Wilmington, but his 1935 season was cut short by illness.

In February 1936, Smith reported to the Maple Leafs' training camp in Haines City, Florida, making his fourth attempt to win a full-time berth with the team. He did not make the roster and was sent back to the Piedmont League for the 1936 season. The Wilmington Pirates had moved to Durham, North Carolina, and Smith thus spent the 1936 season with the Durham Bulls, batting .217 in 66 games.

In the spring of 1937, at age 22, Smith finally earned a full-time spot on the Maple Leafs' roster. He became one of the team's starting outfielders and performed well until injuring his leg. At the end of the 1937 season, The Sporting News praised his performance: "The outfield, one of the best in the league last season, needs little improvement. Mayo Smith came along in great style and should be ready for a fine season in 1938. He was hitting the ball and making great defensive plays when, unfortunately, a leg injury took him out of the line-up for several weeks."

He continued as a starting outfielder for the Maple Leafs in 1938 and 1939. In 1939, he played on a Maple Leafs team that included future Baseball Hall of Fame inductees Heinie Manush and Tony Lazzeri. Smith compiled a .286 batting average in 1939, 45 points higher than Manush and 59 points higher than Lazzeri. During the 1939 season, Smith also had 196 total bases in 148 games and a career-high 385 putouts and 13 assists. In July 1939, The Sporting News described Smith as "the most improved player of the season" and reported that his "defensive work is nothing short of sensational."

=== Buffalo Bisons ===
In December 1939, Smith was traded by the Maple Leafs to the Buffalo Bisons, the Detroit Tigers farm team in the International League, in exchange for outfielder Johnnie Tyler. Buffalo manager Steve O'Neill later called the trade "the best deal I made in my three years in Buffalo and one of the best of my career." Smith played five seasons, principally as a center fielder, with the Bisons from 1940 to 1944. In 1998, 54 years after he concluded his playing career with the Bisons, Smith was posthumously inducted into the Buffalo Baseball Hall of Fame.

Promptly upon joining the Bisons, Smith impressed observers with his defensive play. In April 1940, during a Florida exhibition game against the Detroit Tigers, Smith made a catch that Buffalo sports writer Cy Kritzer later called the greatest catch he had ever seen, including "The Catch" made by Willie Mays in 1954. With the bases loaded in the ninth inning, Hank Greenberg hit the ball better than 475 feet into dead center. According to Kritzer, "Smith turned his back to home plate and dashed straight for the fence. No one gave him a chance to catch the ball. But in the last stride, he leaped and the ball stuck in the web." Bucky Harris, who managed Smith in Buffalo, later said, "My idea of a perfect game would be to have the opposition hit 27 balls into center field ... with Mayo Smith out there."

In 1941, Smith hit a walk-off, three-run home run with two out in the bottom of the tenth inning. The Bisons' business manager John Stiglmeier leaped over the rail from his box and ran onto the field to slap Smith on the back when he completed his home-run trot. Smith noted that the slap "actually knocked the wind clean plumb out of me."

On March 25, 1942, 600 residents of Smith's home town of Lake Worth, Florida celebrated "Mayo Smith Day." The Bisons played a spring training game in Lake Worth that day. In a 2–1 loss to the Columbus Red Birds, Smith drove in the Bisons' only run with a single in the eighth inning. Smith went on to have one of his most successful seasons in 1942. He appeared in a career-high 154 games, hit 11 home runs, and compiled a .279 batting average and a .386 on-base percentage. Playing principally in center field, he also had 384 putouts and 13 assists.

After playing in every game for the Bisons in 1942, Smith suffered an injury at the end of spring training in 1943. Smith returned to the line-up and appeared in 136 games in the outfield. However, he suffered sustained trouble with the arches in his feet throughout the 1943 season, leading some to speculate that he was "washed up." Smith attributed the trouble to a job working 12 hours a day on cement floors in a war plant during the 1942–43 off-season. After the 1943 season, Smith tried to stay off his feet as much as possible and soaked his feet each night in solutions prepared by the Buffalo trainer. His wife, Louise, told a reporter, "Mayo eats all his meals with his feet in a tub of water."

In 1944, Smith rebounded from his injuries and had his best season in professional baseball. In May and June 1944, he had separate streaks in which he reached base in 14 and 13 consecutive plate appearances. The latter streak included nine consecutive hits. Smith also won praise in 1944 for his baseball intelligence and as a player who "never made a mistake or missed a signal." In August 1944, Syracuse manager Jewel Ens said: "Smith is the miracle man of the 1944 season. ... He's the best hit-and-run man in the league. He's a great hustler and a fine all-around player, and you can say one more thing, he's a credit to the game."

At the end of the 1944 season, Smith had compiled a career-high .340 batting average (.495 on-base percentage), won the International League batting title, led the league with 149 walks, and compiled 232 total bases, 42 extra base hits and 12 stolen bases in 150 games. He was unanimously selected to the International League All-Star team and finished second behind Howard Moss in voting for the International League Most Valuable Player award.

=== Philadelphia Athletics ===
On November 1, 1944, following his breakout season with the Bisons, Smith was selected by Connie Mack of the Philadelphia Athletics in the Rule 5 draft. However, Smith's opportunity to play in the big leagues was delayed by illness. In February 1945, Smith contracted rheumatic fever and was taken to Buffalo General Hospital by ambulance. He was hospitalized for three weeks and lost 20 pounds as the ailment settled into his arms and shoulders. In March 1945, The Sporting News reported that Smith would remain "flat on his back" for six more weeks and that he had given up hope of playing baseball in 1945. Smith said that he intended to return to his home in Florida as soon as he was well enough to walk.

Smith was advised by doctors to remain out of baseball in 1945, but by the end of May 1945, he began working out with the Bisons. He joined the Athletics in mid-June and made his Major League Baseball debut at age 30 on June 24, 1945. He appeared in 73 games with the 1945 Philadelphia Athletics and became the team's starting left fielder for the last part of the season. The 1945 Athletics finished in last place in the American League and compiled a 52–98 (.347) record. Smith compiled a .212 batting average and a .333 on-base percentage.

=== Portland Beavers ===
In December 1945, the Athletics traded Smith and Steve Gerkin to the Triple A Portland Beavers of the Pacific Coast League in exchange for Wandel B. "Lefty" Mossor. Smith played for the Beavers for three years from 1946 to 1948.

In 1946, Smith led the Beavers in putouts by an outfielder with 298 in 122 games. Although his batting average was .249, his propensity to draw walks boosted his on-base percentage to .341.

In 1947, Smith hit .311 and drew 79 walks for a .418 on-base percentage. He also had 30 doubles and five home runs and again led the team in putouts by an outfielder with 272 in 128 games. On August 5, 1947, Smith hit an inside-the-park home run in the 11th inning to give the Beavers a victory over the Oakland Oaks.

In May 1948, Smith was still living in the Portland area when his family was caught in the Vanport Flood. After a dike collapsed, Vanport City, Oregon was deluged. Smith lost his automobile and personal belongings as his home was covered under 15 to 18 feet of water. His wife and six-year-old daughter narrowly escaped from the floodwaters by climbing to the roofs of four different buildings before being rescued.

== Managerial career ==
=== Yankees' farm system ===
For six years from 1949 to 1954, Smith served as a manager, and in some cases player-manager, in the farm system of the New York Yankees. He served as a player-manager of the Class C Amsterdam Rugmakers of the Canadian–American League from 1949 to 1950. In his first month with the Rugmakers, Smith hit six home runs, including three that sailed over the 310-foot right field fence at Amsterdam's Mohawk Mills Park during a double-header against Three Rivers. He totalled a career-high 19 home runs in 1949, also adding 116 RBIs in 119 games. His Amsterdam teams finished in fifth and fourth place in the Canadian–American League.

In December 1950, he was promoted to Class B as the manager of the Norfolk Tars of the Piedmont League. Smith served as the Tars manager in 1951 and 1952 and led the team to Piedmont League pennants both years. His 1952 Norfolk team compiled a 96–36 (.727) record. Noting that the 1952 team included Bill Skowron, Bill Virdon, Johnny Kucks and Gus Triandos, Smith later recalled: "Manage a team like that? Shucks, I could go fishing."

In December 1952, based on the strength of his performance in Norfolk, the Yankees promoted Smith to the Double-A Birmingham Barons of the Southern Association. He was the Barons' manager from 1953 to 1954.

=== Philadelphia Phillies ===
In October 1954, at age 39, Smith was named manager of the Philadelphia Phillies, replacing Terry Moore. Phillies general manager Roy Hamey made the announcement and introduced Smith at a press conference in the Warwick Hotel. The Sporting News described the reaction to the Phillies' hiring of an unknown minor league manager:

"[Hamey] grabbed a microphone which was convenient and said, 'This is Mayo Smith, the new manager of the Phillies.' ... For at least one minute there was an embarrassing silence. Still no one knew who he was. To say that the gathering was surprised was the greatest understatement of the year. Fifty men were speechless. They had more or less expected a new manager, a Lefty O'Doul, a Lou Boudreau or a Skeeter Newsome. But Mayo Smith ... who is he?"

Despite the "loud guffaws" among the Philadelphia press, Yankees manager Casey Stengel endorsed the hiring of Smith, saying:

"Mayo will make good. He is one of the coming young managers in baseball. I watched him closely in my advance camps, and he was the one manager in the Yankee chain who asked questions, who wanted to know why I liked things done this way and not that way. He never intimated that he knew all the answers. He kept notes, and he learned."

Red Smith described the relatively unknown Smith at the time: "He is tall and rangy, with graying brown hair and young, pleasant features smoothly tanned. There are crinkly lines of laughter around his blue eyes."

After winning the National League pennant in 1950 (the year of the "Whiz Kids"), the Phillies had dropped into the middle of the National League, compiling a losing record in 1954. Smith became the team's fourth manager in three years. In Smith's first year with the Phillies, the team started poorly, dropping to 11 games below .500. The team rallied in the second half of the season and finished in fourth place with a 77–77 record, including 23 wins by pitcher Robin Roberts. At the end of the season, Smith received 30 of 99 votes by the Baseball Writers' Association of America as the 1955 National League Manager of the Year; he finished in second place behind Walter Alston.

The Phillies slipped to 71–83 in 1956 with Richie Ashburn being the only regular player to bat over .289. After six consecutive 20-win seasons, Robin Roberts led the National League with 18 losses in 1956 while falling 1 win short of 20. In September 1956, and despite the losing record, the Phillies showed their confidence in Smith by signing him to a one-year contract extension through the 1957 season.

In 1957, the Phillies returned to 77–77 despite pitcher Robin Roberts having a losing record of 10–22. Pitcher Jack Sanford, named Rookie of the Year in 1957, saved the Phillies from falling below .500 with his record of 19–8. In 1958, the team slipped below .500 with a record of 39–45 in late July. On July 22, 1958, Smith was fired and replaced by Eddie Sawyer.

After Smith was fired, the 1958 Phillies dropped to last place under Sawyer. The Phillies finished in last place in the National League for four consecutive years from 1958 to 1961. In Smith's 3 1/2 years with the Phillies, he compiled a 264–281 record (.484). In the three-and-a-half years after he was fired, the Phillies fell to 200–332 (.376).

=== Cincinnati Reds ===
In August 1958, shortly after Smith was fired by the Phillies, unconfirmed reports were published indicating that a deal was in the works for the Cincinnati Reds to hire Smith as their manager. Jimmy Dykes had been named interim manager after Birdie Tebbetts resigned the post. At the end of September, Smith signed a one-year contract to take over as manager for the 1959 season. Cincinnati general manager Gabe Paul announced: "We believe that in [43-year-old] Mayo Smith we have a young, progressive, middle-of-the-road manager who will help formulate the kind of baseball organization that will result in success for our club." In The Cincinnati Post, Pat Harmon expressed skepticism: "[T]he naming of Smith caused no ripple of excitement in the city. Here is a man who had a fourth and two fifths and was dropped by the Phillies."

Smith took over a Reds team that finished the 1958 season in fourth place with a 76–78 record. The team featured Vada Pinson and future Hall of Famer Frank Robinson, but lacked a pitcher who would win more than 13 games in 1959. After a good start, the Reds fell to seventh place with a 35–45 record at the All-Star break. On July 8, 1959, Smith was fired and replaced by Fred Hutchinson, who became the Reds' fourth manager in less than a year. Cincinnati sports writer Earl Lawson wrote that the change was driven by the belief that the team required tougher leadership. Lawson wrote:

Perhaps it's fitting to say that Smith is an example of Leo Durocher's oft-repeated statement, "Nice guys finish last." Ball players "liked" Smith and were quick to admit this, but whether they respected his judgment is questionable. "Chewing-out" players was foreign to his personality.

Smith felt he was never given a chance in Cincinnati and spoke out against demands for instant success. He said, "It was humiliating. I hardly had a chance to get acquainted with the players."

=== Business interests ===
During the 1950s, Smith also had several business interests. In 1958, he developed a $600,000-plus, state-of-the-art "bowling palace" on the Dixie Highway in Palm Beach County, Florida. The facility was equipped with automatic pin-setters, air conditioning, a nursery for bowlers with young children, and pro shop. Smith secured investments from other Major League Baseball managers and players, including Fred Hutchinson and Hank Sauer, and the facility was called Major League Lanes. By the end of 1959, Smith also had successful business interests in Florida real estate, West Virginia oil, and a bowling alley chain in the Carolinas.

=== Yankees' scout ===
In September 1959, Smith, at age 44, Smith returned to the New York Yankees as "a field executive with duties as a major and minor league scout." Despite his business interests, Smith explained the attraction of returning to baseball:

It's simply that baseball gets in your blood and you can't get it out. Like being a compulsive gambler or something along those lines. You know when you become a manager, that you're going to be fired sooner or later, no matter how good a job you feel you are doing. From the moment you sign the contract you're as disposable as a wounded pirate. The only two guys who ever beat the rap were Connie Mack and Clark Griffith. That's because they owned the club.

At the end of the 1960 season, Casey Stengel retired as the Yankees' manager, and Smith was rumored to be a candidate to replace Stengel. Ralph Houk was chosen instead. In 1961, Smith was described as "a combination master scout and trouble shooter" for the Yankees. He remained a scout in the Yankees organization until 1966. During his years as a scout for the Yankees, Smith "toured the press rooms and the better watering spots" across the major leagues, "avail[ed] himself of free food and drinks in press rooms," developed a reputation as "a warm friendly man", and was sometimes referred to as "America's Guest."

Prior to the 1964 World Series, Smith was assigned to scout the St. Louis Cardinals. He reported that Tim McCarver hit every ball to left field. Smith later recalled that, after Game 2 of the World Series, as McCarver pulled every ball to right field, Yogi Berra came to him and said, "You sure you were watching McCarver hit or were you somewhere else?"

=== Detroit Tigers ===
==== Hiring ====
During the 1966 season, the manager of the Detroit Tigers, Chuck Dressen, suffered a heart attack and eventually died in mid-August. After Dressen's heart attack, the Tigers named Bob Swift as manager. Swift was diagnosed with lung cancer (he died two months after Dressen), and Frank Skaff filled in for the rest of the season. As the team searched for a new manager, both Al López and Bill Rigney turned down the position. On October 3, 1966, the Tigers' general manager Jim Campbell signed Mayo Smith to a two-year contract at an annual salary of $40,000. As had been the case in Philadelphia and St. Louis, the hiring of relatively unknown Smith was not met with enthusiasm in the Detroit press. Joe Falls of the Detroit Free Press called him a "nobody" who fit Jim Campbell's image of the "elderly, experienced, devoted" manager. Jerry Green of The Detroit News later wrote: "Sportswriters covering the team at the time regarded Smith as a bland man without imagination."

Within several days after being hired, Smith put together a new coaching staff, including Tony Cuccinello as third base coach, Johnny Sain as pitching coach, Hal Naragon as the bull-pen coach, and Wally Moses as first-base coach.

Smith took over a talented team that had not played up to expectations, finishing third, fourth or fifth for five consecutive years. At his first press conference in Detroit, Smith identified pitching as the problem that most required attention and the outfield (featuring Al Kaline, Willie Horton, Jim Northrup, Mickey Stanley, and Gates Brown) as the greatest strength. His first major initiative was a realignment of the infield. He announced in the fall of 1966 that he intended to shore up the team defensively by moving Dick McAuliffe from shortstop to second base and having Ray Oyler take over as shortstop. Smith's decision was met with "some public sneering." Dick McAuliffe had been the Tigers starting shortstop since 1962 and had been selected as an All-Star in 1965 and 1966. And while Oyler was considered an excellent defensive shortstop, he had hit below .200 in both 1965 and 1966.

==== 1967 season ====
The 1967 Tigers got off to a quick start, compiling 26–14 record in the first 40 games. Catcher Bill Freehan began the season with a hot bat, saw his batting average climb by 50 points in 1967 over 1966, increased his RBI total from 46 to 74, and finished third in the voting for the 1967 American League Most Valuable Player. Freehan credited Smith and Wally Moses for improving his offensive performance.

The 1967 season proved to be a roller-coaster ride, as the team lost 10 of 12 games from June 7 to 19, won seven in a row from July 2 to 9, and then lost six in a row. As the team endured successive hot and cold periods, Smith developed a reputation for "keeping his cool" and not "chewing out" his players. Smith resisted juggling his line-up, noting that he saw his role as building confidence and that he did not want to over-manage the team. In September, the Tigers were caught in a four-way pennant race with the Red Sox, Twins, and White Sox. The Tigers won 17 of the last 27 games and finished the season with a 91–71 (.562) record—one game behind the Red Sox, losing the pennant on the last day of the season after splitting a doubleheader with the California Angels.

==== 1968 season ====
The following year, the 1968 Detroit Tigers won the American League pennant by 12 games with a record of 103–59 (.636).

Smith was credited with mentoring pitcher Denny McLain during the 1968 season. McLain, who became the first pitcher since 1934 to win 30 games, went 31–6 with a 1.96 ERA, won the Cy Young Award and the American League Most Valuable Player Award. Asked about McLain's sometimes odd statements, Smith was protective, noting, "This is a 24-year-old boy reaching for Utopia. ... You can't take the brashness away from him, and you wouldn't want to."

The 1968 season was not free from controversy. After being pulled from a game in August, pitcher Joe Sparma told a reporter that he felt "humiliated" and made "rather harsh comments" about Smith. When asked for a response, Smith said he "didn't want to get into a spitting contest with a skunk." Smith refused to start Sparma for several weeks afterward. When Sparma finally got another start on September 17, 1968, he pitched a one-run complete game against the Yankees to clinch the pennant. The Sparma-Smith feud continued, and Sparma pitched only 1/3 of an inning in the 1968 World Series.

Another August controversy arose after Dick McAuliffe charged the mound and knocked down Chicago White Sox pitcher Tommy John. American League president Joe Cronin initially imposed a $250 fine on McAuliffe, but subsequently modified the sanction to include a five-day penalty. Smith was convinced that Cronin had been swayed by the White Sox, exchanged angry words with Cronin in a phone call, and publicly called Cronin "a weak man" who had been caught in "a big lie." When the Tigers won the World Series, Cronin sought to patch up his relationship with Smith, but Smith declined, saying, "I don't get over things like this right away."

The biggest setback of the season was the loss of future Baseball Hall of Fame inductee and right fielder Al Kaline to an injury. Kaline broke his arm after being hit by a pitch in late May and missed nearly three months of the season. When he returned in August, Smith was faced with a problem in getting him back into the lineup. Left fielder Willie Horton finished the 1968 season second in the American League with 36 home runs and a .543 slugging percentage. Center-fielder Mickey Stanley led all American League outfielders with a perfect 1.000 fielding percentage and was on his way to a second consecutive Gold Glove Award. Jim Northrup, who had taken over Kaline's spot in right field, finished the 1968 season third in the league with 90 RBIs and hit five grand slams during the season. Smith played Kaline at first base for 22 games, but the team already had Norm Cash as its regular first baseman. Concerned about his team's offense as the team prepared for the World Series, Smith moved Stanley to shortstop for the last nine games of the regular season. Stanley replaced Ray Oyler, who was an excellent fielder but hit only .135 for the season.

==== 1968 World Series ====
The Tigers won the pennant and faced the St. Louis Cardinals in the 1968 World Series. Behind the pitching of Bob Gibson, the Cardinals took a 3–1 edge in the first four games. The Tigers won the final three games to capture the World Series.

Smith's strategic moves in the World Series drew praise even from those who had previously been critics. Smith's most dramatic strategic call was his decision to continue playing center-fielder Mickey Stanley at shortstop, for all seven games of the World Series. Even Smith's closest friends questioned the move, and critics gravely opined that he was weakening the Tigers at two positions, given Stanley's Gold Glove season in center field. While Stanley made two errors, neither led to a Cardinal run, and his play at shortstop was generally solid. More importantly, the move allowed Smith to keep both Jim Northrup and Al Kaline in the line-up, and each had key hits to fuel the Tigers' comeback against the Cardinals. Kaline had a .379 batting average in the World Series with two home runs, eight RBIs, and the game-winning hit in Game 5. Northrup also belted two home runs (including a grand slam in Game 6), hit a two-run triple in Game 7, and totalled eight RBIs.

The Boston Globe later called Smith's move of Stanley to shortstop for the World Series "the gutsiest move in history." ESPN has ranked Smith's decision to move Stanley to shortstop as the third "gutsiest call" in sports history, and one of the Ten Greatest Coaching Decisions of the 20th Century in any sport.

Smith also drew praise for his adjustments to the pitching rotation in the World Series. Watson Spoelstra wrote: "Mayo's managing against the Cardinals couldn't have been better." With the Cardinals leading the series 3–1, the Tigers trailed 3–2 in the seventh inning of Game 5. In the bottom of the seventh inning, Smith opted to allow starting pitcher Mickey Lolich to bat, despite the Tigers need to put a runner on base. Lolich got a base hit to start a two-run rally, scored the tying run, struck out Roger Maris and picked off Lou Brock in the ninth inning, and pitched his second complete-game victory of the series. In Game 6, Smith surprised observers by calling on Denny McLain to start on two days rest, and despite poor performances in Games 1 and 4. The Tigers gave McLain a 12–0 lead with a 10-run third inning, and McLain pitched a complete game, allowing only one run. In Game 7, Smith called on Lolich to pitch on two days rest. Matched against Bob Gibson, Lolich pitched his third complete game, allowing only one run, and led the team to a 4–1 victory.

At the end of the 1968 season, Smith received The Sporting News Manager of the Year Award, receiving 17 of 19 votes. The Sporting News noted that the key players on the 1968 Tigers "had been around for several years, when the Tigers were going nowhere. The man whose arrival coincided with a Tiger awakening is Mayo Smith. ... Mayo is making it tough for people who claim the manager isn't important." Smith also received a two-year contract extension with a $15,000 raise to $55,000 a season. Smith's fan mail was so voluminous after the Tigers won the World Series that it took five people two full days to put things in order.

==== 1969 season ====
In 1969, the Tigers compiled a 90–72 (.556) record but finished in second place – 19 games behind the 1969 Baltimore Orioles. The team relied on power as four players (Cash, Kaline, Horton and Northrup) hit more than 20 home runs, but lacked speed and finished last in the American League with only 35 stolen bases. Denny McLain won 24 games, and Mickey Lolich won 19 while striking out 271 batters. With the second-place finish, Smith's teams had finished in first or second place for three consecutive years. No Detroit manager had accomplished that feat since Steve O'Neill from 1945 to 1947.

==== 1970 season ====
In 1970, the Tigers fell to 79–83 (.488) in a season marked by the suspension of Denny McLain for his association with bookmakers and by the publication of Bill Freehan's behind-the-scenes book on the 1969 team. The Tigers were in third place, seven games behind Baltimore, at the end of June, but collapsed in the second half of the season, finishing 29 games behind the Orioles. McLain won only three games in 1970, and Mickey Lolich led the American League with 19 losses and a 14–19 record. The team's power-hitting lineup also lost its punch, as no player hit more than 17 home runs. The team also compiled the lowest batting average in the American League at .238.

As the 1970 Tigers headed for their first losing season since 1963 and their worst record since 1960, Smith came under increasing criticism from fans and the press. Immediately after the season, on October 2, 1970, the Tigers fired Smith and replaced him with Billy Martin. Before leaving Detroit, Smith called the city a great sports town in his farewell news conference, but he privately lashed out at the fans in a conversation with reporters: "They wouldn't know a baseball player from a Japanese aviator. The fans in Detroit are ignorant. They'd rather see you leave a tired pitcher in and get beat with a complete game than bring in a fresh one that might win it for you."

In all or parts of nine seasons as a manager, Smith compiled an overall record of 662–612 (.520).

== Managerial record ==
Team	Year	Regular season					Postseason			
Team	Year	Games	Won	Lost	Win %	Finish	Won	Lost	Win %	Result
PHI	1955	154	77	77	.500	4th in NL	–	–	–	–
PHI	1956	154	71	83	.461	5th in NL	–	–	–	–
PHI	1957	154	77	77	.500	5th in NL	–	–	–	–
PHI	1958	84	39	45	.464	(fired)	–	–	–	–
PHI total		548	264	282	.484		0	0	–	
CIN	1959	80	35	45	.438	(fired)	–	–	–	
CIN total		80	35	45	.438		0	0	–	
DET	1967	163	91	71	.562	2nd in AL	–	–	–	–
DET	1968	164	103	59	.636	1st in AL	4	3	.571	Won World Series (STL)
DET	1969	162	90	72	.556	2nd in AL	–	–	–	–
DET	1970	162	79	83	.488	4th in AL	–	–	–	–
DET total		651	363	285	.560		4	3	.571	
Total		1,279	662	612	.520		4	3	.571	

== Oakland Athletics ==
After spending most of the 1971 season at his home in Florida, Smith was hired by Charlie Finley as a special scout for the Oakland Athletics during the last month of the 1971 season. He was assigned to cover the Baltimore Orioles in preparation for the 1971 American League Championship Series. On September 2, 1971, The Baltimore Sun reported on Smith's espionage assignment: "Super Spy Sets Sights on Birds." Despite Smith's scouting report, the Orioles swept the A's in three games as Dave McNally, Mike Cuellar and Jim Palmer held the A's to seven runs in three games.

== Later years and family ==
In March 1940, Smith married Louise Pauline Otto in a ceremony held at the Our Savior Lutheran Church in Lake Worth, Florida. Both were graduates of Lake City High School. They had a daughter, Judith Ann, and a son, Fred M. Smith. During the off-season and in retirement, Smith and his wife continued to live in Lake Worth.

In November 1977, Smith suffered a massive stroke while dining with his family at a restaurant in Lake Worth. He did not regain consciousness and died at age 62 at Bethesda Memorial Hospital in Boynton Beach.

== Mayo Smith Society and King Tiger Award ==
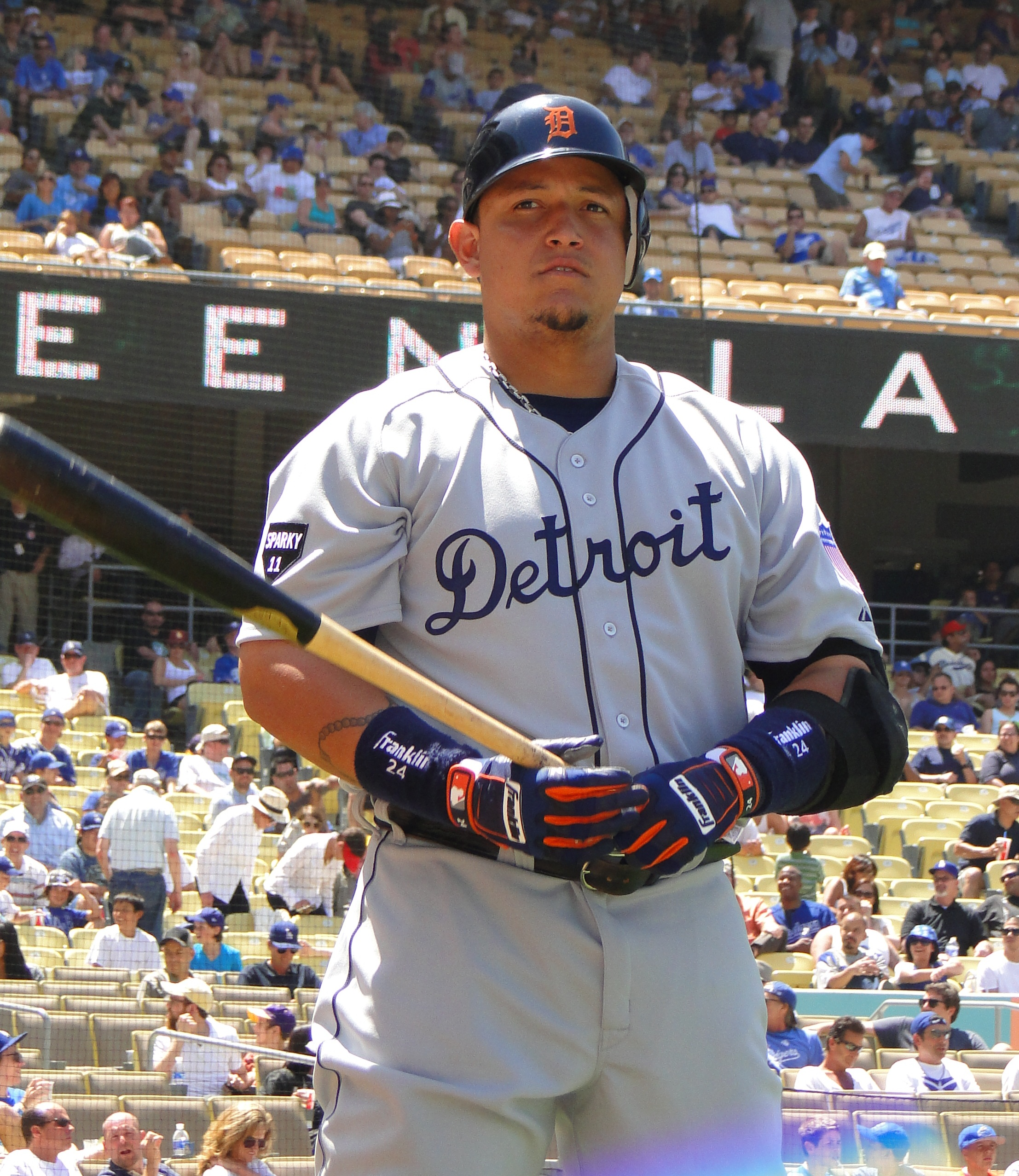
Miguel Cabrera, three-time recipient of the Mayo Smith Society's "King Tiger Award"

In 1983, the "Mayo Smith Society" was formed in Smith's memory. It continues to operate as the international fan club for Tigers fans, sponsoring an annual spring training trip, an annual gathering in Detroit, making charitable contributions, and publishing the "Tigers Stripes" and "E-Mayo Flash" newsletters. Society co-founder Dale Petroskey (later president of the Baseball Hall of Fame) told The New York Times in 2006 that "Smith inspired the club's name because he was 'a somewhat forgettable figure in Tiger history' who shocked baseball in 1968 by moving center fielder Mickey Stanley to shortstop for the Series. 'What an amazingly bold roll of the dice ... Mayo gambled big time, and he won."

Since 2004, the Mayo Smith Society has given its annual "King Tiger Award" to a Detroit Tigers player for on-field and off-field contributions. The players receiving the award are:

- 2004: Carlos Guillén and Iván Rodríguez (tie)
- 2005: Plácido Polanco
- 2006: Kenny Rogers
- 2007: Magglio Ordóñez
- 2008: Miguel Cabrera
- 2009: Justin Verlander
- 2010: Miguel Cabrera (second time)
- 2011: Justin Verlander (second time)
- 2012: Miguel Cabrera (third time)
- 2013: Max Scherzer
- 2014: Víctor Martínez
- 2015: J. D. Martinez
- 2016: Michael Fulmer
- 2017: Nicholas Castellanos
- 2018: Nicholas Castellanos
- 2019: Matthew Boyd
- 2020: Jeimer Candelario
- 2021: Jeimer Candelario
- 2022: Tarik Skubal
- 2023: Riley Greene
- 2024: Tarik Skubal
