= Lazor =

Lazor may refer to:

- Theodosius (Lazor) (secular name Frank Lazor; born 1933), retired primate of the Orthodox Church in America
- Bill Lazor (born 1972), American football coach and former player
- Johnny Lazor (1912–2002), American Major League Baseball player
- Sascha Lazor, member of the Mad Caddies, an American ska punk band founded 1995

== See also ==
- Laser, a device that emits light through a process of optical amplification based on the stimulated emission of electromagnetic radiation
