= Ernie Kish =

American baseball player (1918-1993)

- Kish with the Philadelphia Athletics, c. 1945
- Outfielder
- Born: February 6, 1918; Washington, D.C., US
- Died: December 21, 1993 (aged 75); Kirtland, Ohio, US
- Batted: Left Threw: Right

MLB debut
- July 29, 1945, for the Philadelphia Athletics

Last MLB appearance
- September 23, 1945, for the Philadelphia Athletics

Career statistics
- Batting average: .245
- Home runs: 0
- Runs batted in: 10
- Stats at Baseball Reference

Teams
- Philadelphia Athletics (1945)

Ernest Alexander Kish (February 6, 1918 – December 21, 1993) was an American professional baseball outfielder who played for the 1945 Philadelphia Athletics of Major League Baseball (MLB). Listed at 5 feet 9.5 inches (1.765 m) and 170 pounds (77 kg), he batted left-handed and threw right-handed.

== Biography ==
Kish played college baseball and college basketball at Ohio University in Athens, Ohio, and then played one season of minor league baseball. In 1941, he appeared in 20 games for the Riverside Reds and 38 games for the Mount Airy Graniteers. In those 58 games, he compiled a .259 batting average with five home runs. Defensively, he had a .957 fielding average. He then served in the United States Coast Guard from April 1942 until July 1945. he contracted an illness during the North African landings which limited his future athletic potential.

In 1945, Kish played his only season in the major leagues, appearing in games from late July through late September. In 43 games with the Philadelphia Athletics, he batted .245 with 10 RBIs. Defensively, he appeared at all three outfield positions, committing four errors in 59 total chances for a .932 fielding average. Kish was with the Athletics during 1946 spring training, but was released from the team at the end of March. He then discontinued his baseball career to take over a family business.

Kish was born in 1918 in Washington, D.C. He was inducted to the Kermit Blosser Ohio Athletics Hall of Fame in 1990. He died of cancer in 1993 at the age of 75 in Kirtland, Ohio, and was interred at Lake View Cemetery in Cleveland.
