= Joe Nossek =

American baseball player and coach (1940–2026)

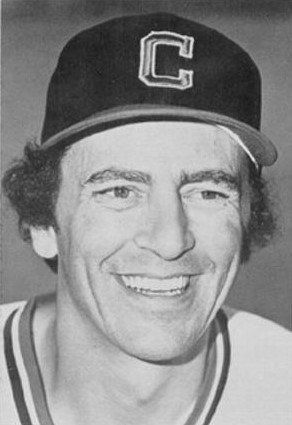
- Outfielder
- Born: November 8, 1940; Cleveland, Ohio, U.S.
- Died: February 12, 2026 (aged 85); Amherst, Ohio, U.S.
- Batted: Right Threw: Right

MLB debut
- April 18, 1964, for the Minnesota Twins

Last MLB appearance
- September 13, 1970, for the St. Louis Cardinals

MLB statistics
- Batting average: .228
- Home runs: 3
- Runs batted in: 53
- Stats at Baseball Reference

Teams
- As player: Minnesota Twins (1964–1966); Kansas City / Oakland Athletics (1966–1967, 1969); St. Louis Cardinals (1969–1970); As coach: Milwaukee Brewers (1973–1975); Minnesota Twins (1976); Cleveland Indians (1977–1981); Kansas City Royals (1982–1983); Chicago White Sox (1984–1986, 1990–2003)

Joseph Rudolph Nossek (November 8, 1940 – February 12, 2026) was an American Major League Baseball outfielder, coach and scout. He threw and batted right-handed, and stood 6' (183 cm) tall and weighed 178 pounds (81 kg) as an active player.

== College career ==
Nossek attended Ohio University and played on the Ohio Bobcats baseball team; he was inducted to the Kermit Blosser Ohio Athletics Hall of Fame in 2013.

== Professional career ==
Nossek was signed by the Minnesota Twins as an amateur free agent in 1961. He made his major league debut for the club on April 18, 1964, against the Washington Senators.

A light eater, Nossek was known as "coffee and juice" to his Minnesota teammates. He served as a back-up outfielder on the pennant-winning Twins team of 1965, hitting .218 in 87 games. He also played some games at third base for the squad. Despite his modest abilities, he started in center field for most of the games of the 1965 World Series over All-Star Jimmie Hall. The Twins lost to Sandy Koufax and the Los Angeles Dodgers in seven games.

During the 1966 season, Nossek's contract was purchased by the Kansas City Athletics and played in 174 games for them over the next two years. In the middle of the 1969 campaign, he was traded to the St. Louis Cardinals for Bob Johnson. He only played in 10 games for St. Louis, however, and retired after the 1970 season. Overall, Nossek batted .228 with three home runs and 53 runs batted in in 295 games during his six-year major league playing career.

== Coaching ==
Nossek, skilled at sign stealing, was a longtime (28-year) coach in the major leagues after his active career ended, serving with the Milwaukee Brewers (1973–75), Twins (1976), Cleveland Indians (1977–81), Kansas City Royals (1982–83) and Chicago White Sox (1984–86; 1990–2003). He then became a scout for the Houston Astros.

== Death ==
Nossek died on February 12, 2026, at the age of 85.
