= Hal Peck =

American baseball player (1917–1995)

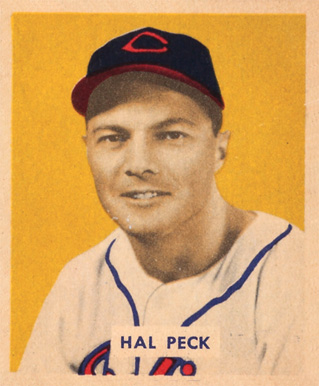
- Right fielder
- Born: April 20, 1917; Big Bend, Wisconsin, U.S.
- Died: April 13, 1995 (aged 77); Milwaukee, Wisconsin, U.S.
- Batted: Left Threw: Left

MLB debut
- May 13, 1943, for the Brooklyn Dodgers

Last MLB appearance
- September 25, 1949, for the Cleveland Indians

MLB statistics
- Batting average: .279
- Home runs: 15
- Runs batted in: 112
- Stats at Baseball Reference

Teams
- Brooklyn Dodgers (1943); Philadelphia Athletics (1944–1946); Cleveland Indians (1947–1949)

Career highlights and awards
- World Series champion (1948)

Harold Arthur Peck (April 20, 1917 – April 13, 1995) was an American professional baseball right fielder. He played seven seasons in Major League Baseball (MLB) from 1943 to 1949 for the Brooklyn Dodgers, Philadelphia Athletics, and Cleveland Indians. In 355 career games, Peck recorded a batting average of .279 and accumulated 15 home runs and 112 runs batted in (RBI).

Born in Big Bend, Wisconsin, Peck began to play professional baseball in 1938. He spent two years in the lower minor leagues, then spent the better part of five years with the Milwaukee Brewers of the American Association. In 1942, Peck lost two toes in a shooting accident, but despite the injury was able to continue playing baseball. He made his major league debut in 1943 with the Brooklyn Dodgers, then joined the Philadelphia Athletics 1944. He spent three seasons with them, and was an everyday player in 1945. Peck was then traded to the New York Yankees and the Cleveland Indians. He achieved a career high in games played with 114 in 1947, and spent 1948 and 1949 as a pinch hitter. Peck also played a game in the 1948 World Series for the Indians. After being traded from the Indians after the 1949 season, he retired from baseball, and died in 1995.

== Early life and minor leagues ==
Peck was born in Big Bend, Wisconsin and graduated from Big Bend High School. As a youth, he participated the Land O' Lakes League, a Wisconsin-based amateur baseball league, and took part in statewide baseball tournaments. In 1937, Peck's father-in-law arranged for a tryout with the Milwaukee Brewers of the American Association. The Brewers signed Peck, and sent him to play for the Hopkinsville Hoppers of the Kentucky–Illinois–Tennessee League in 1938, where he finished the season with a .331 batting average and 16 triples in 130 games. In 1939, Peck was promoted to the Bloomington Bloomers of the Illinois–Indiana–Iowa League, where he hit .286 in 69 games. He then joined Milwaukee for the 1940 season, and became recognized as a top prospect by Major League Baseball teams. Bill Veeck, the owner of the Brewers, identified Peck as his favorite player.

In one game during the 1940 season against the Columbus Red Birds, Peck chased down a fly ball and ran into an iron fence, knocking himself out. He managed to hold onto the ball in spite of this, and the catch was noted by sportswriter Harry Grayson as "one of the greatest catches even seen in Columbus." Peck finished the season with a .294 batting average and 14 triples in 136 games, and followed that up in 1942 with a .267 batting average in 144 games. After hitting .333 in 1942, multiple teams were looking to acquire Peck from the Brewers, which included the Chicago White Sox. The Brewers were near a deal with the White Sox when Peck's season abruptly ended. On September 3, Peck lost two toes from his left foot due to a shooting accident. He was attempting to shoot rats on his farm when he tripped over a vine, shooting his foot in the process. This cost him his third and fourth toes on his right foot, and ended the White Sox attempt to purchase Peck.

Shortly after the accident, the Brooklyn Dodgers purchased Peck from the Brewers and gave him a brief trial in 1943, appearing in one game for the team on May 13. After the appearance, he was returned to Milwaukee. Once he returned to Milwaukee, he had a special shoe made for him by a local shoemaker, which allowed him to play without as much pain. However, he missed the majority of the season recovering from his foot injury, only playing in 23 games, as it had not yet healed from the offseason and required further surgery. Peck returned to the Brewers in the 1944 season, and was now able to play every day. He recorded a .345 batting average with 18 stolen bases, and at one point in the season had an average of .398.

== MLB career ==
The Philadelphia Athletics purchased Peck from the Brewers on August 17, 1944 for four players and $20,000. After playing in two games in 1944, Peck entered the 1945 Philadelphia Athletics season as the team's everyday right fielder after winning the job in spring training. In the first week of the season, he hit .367 and led the Athletics to six wins in their first eight games, which raised expectations of the team for the season. The Athletics finished the season with 52 wins, and Peck ended his 112 games played with a .276 batting average and nine triples. During the offseason, he worked in the dairy business with his father-in-law. In 1946, he wanted a $2,500 raise despite admitting he had not played well the prior year, and was denied; he ended up signing with the team at the end of March, missing most of spring training as a result. Peck remained the starting right fielder through the first part of the season, hitting .247 in 48 games. On June 19, the Athletics sold Peck to the New York Yankees.

Despite the purchase, Peck never played a game for the Yankees. He returned to Wisconsin after fighting a bout of influenza, and did not recover fully by the end of the season. On December 6, the Cleveland Indians acquired Peck, Gene Bearden, and Al Gettel from the Yankees in exchange for Sherm Lollar and Ray Mack, which paired Indians owner Bill Veeck with the player he once called his favorite prospect. Peck was named the starting right fielder for 1947, and held that position throughout the season. Near the start of the season, from April 22 to May 11, he hit in 13 straight games. In a game against the Chicago White Sox on May 30, Peck hit two home runs and had five RBIs during the first game of a doubleheader to give Cleveland the 8–4 win. In 114 games for the Indians, the highest of his career, he finished the season with a .293 batting average, eight home runs, and 44 RBIs.

Peck entered the 1948 season in a crowded battle for the right field position with the acquisitions of Allie Clark and Thurman Tucker during the offseason. Larry Doby won the starting job to start the season, and with the other two new Indians also seeing regular playing time, Peck was relegated to pinch hitting duty. In 45 games, Peck had a .286 batting average in 63 at bats. He also appeared in Game 5 of the 1948 World Series to replace Walt Judnich in right field, his only appearance during the Indians' World Series victory. With the acquisition of Bob Kennedy during the 1948 season, Peck was further relegated to pinch-hitting duty for the 1949 season, only seeing playing time to replace a pitcher at bat. He also had a nagging knee injury that caused him trouble when he was inactive, and as a result he was removed from the active roster in May. After he recovered in July, he was originally planned to be sent to the San Diego Padres of the Pacific Coast League, but he was placed back on the Indians' main roster for the rest of the season. Peck finished the season with a .310 batting average in 29 at bats over 33 games, and his last MLB appearance was on September 25.

== Later life ==
After the 1949 season ended, Peck was traded to the Portland Beavers of the Pacific Coast League. However, Peck refused to report to the team, wanting to play closer to Wisconsin instead of on the west coast. The two sides did not reach an agreement, and Peck retired soon after. After retirement, Peck lived in Wisconsin for a time with his family, working for Atlantic Richfield Company, then moved to Arizona. He died at age 77 in Milwaukee, Wisconsin.
