= Fred Walters =

American baseball player (1912–1980)

- Catcher
- Born: September 4, 1912; Laurel, Mississippi
- Died: February 1, 1980 (aged 67); Laurel, Mississippi
- Batted: Right Threw: Right

MLB debut
- April 17, 1945, for the Boston Red Sox

Last MLB appearance
- August 9, 1945, for the Boston Red Sox

MLB statistics
- Batting average: .172
- Home runs: 0
- Runs batted in: 5

Teams
- Boston Red Sox (1945)

Fred James Walters (September 4, 1912 – February 1, 1980) was a backup catcher in Major League Baseball who played briefly for the Boston Red Sox during the 1945 season. Listed at 6 feet (1.8 m) and 210 pounds (95 kg)—and nicknamed "Whale"—Walters batted and threw right-handed. He was signed by the Red Sox in 1937 out of Mississippi State University.

A native of Laurel, Mississippi, Walters was one of many players who only appeared in the majors during World War II. He was a .172 hitter (16-for-93) with two runs, two doubles, one stolen base, and five RBI without home runs in 40 games. In 38 catching appearances he posted a .993 fielding percentage (one error in 144 chances). His professional playing career extended for 11 seasons (1938–42; 1944–49). In June 1946, he abruptly became the player-manager of the Triple-A Louisville Colonels during the six-week suspension of skipper Nemo Leibold and led the squad to a sparkling 34–12 record. The following season, he piloted the Double-A Birmingham Barons to the Southern Association championship.

Walters left baseball after the 1950 season, which he spent as manager of the Chattanooga Lookouts, eventually became a sheriff in Mississippi,. and died in his hometown of Laurel at the age of 67.

== See also ==
- 1945 Boston Red Sox season
