= Kermit Blosser Ohio Athletics Hall of Fame =

Hall of fame for Ohio Bobcats

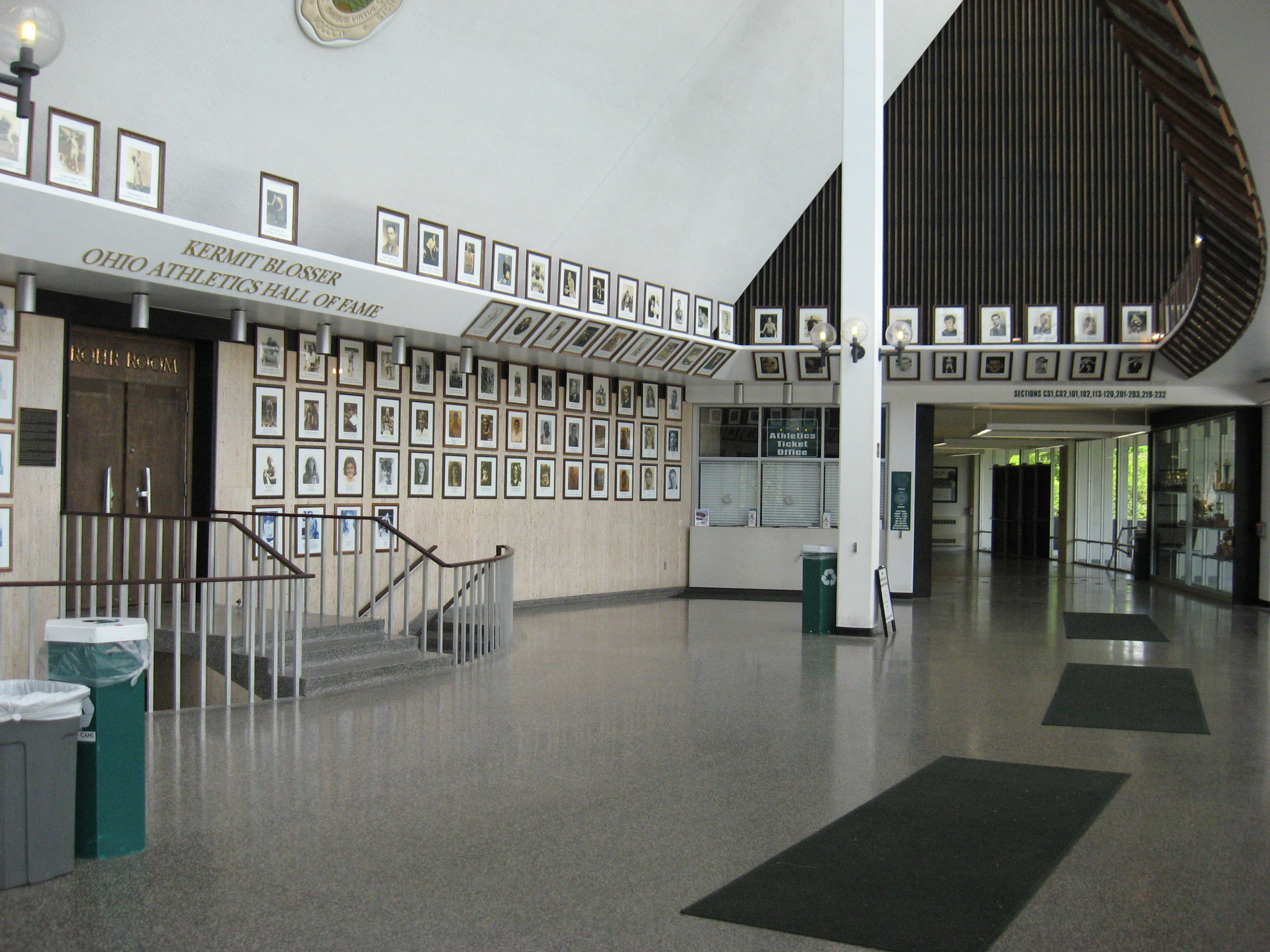
Kermit Blosser Ohio Athletics Hall of Fame

The Kermit Blosser Ohio Athletics Hall of Fame is the hall of fame for Ohio Bobcats athletes and athletic personnel. Since 1965, selectees to the Hall are inducted during annual ceremonies, including recognition at halftime of a home college football game. Inductees are also honored via display of their portrait and accomplishments in the Hall, located in the university's Convocation Center. Since 2000, the Hall usually names three to five new inductees each year.

== Kermit Blosser ==
Kermit Blosser

On October 20, 2006, Ohio athletic director Kirby Hocutt announced the renaming of the Ohio Athletics Hall of Fame to the Kermit Blosser Ohio Athletics Hall of Fame. Blosser, born in 1911, competed in football and wrestling at Ohio in the late 1920s and early 1930s. After serving in the military during World War II, he became an assistant coach at Ohio in 1946. He coached multiple sports for many years, ultimately retiring in 1988. Blosser was inducted to the NCAA Golf Coaches Hall of Fame in 1980 and the MAC Hall of Fame in 1988. He died in 2006, aged 95.

== Members by induction year ==
=== 1965–1969 ===
1965

- Frank Baumholtz, '41 (baseball, men's basketball)
- Claude Chrisman, '32 (football)
- Stanley Dougan, '14 (baseball)
- Russ Finsterwald, '19 (football, men's basketball head coach, football head coach)
- C. O. Gibson, '12 (baseball, men's basketball, football)
- B. T. Grover, '19 (baseball, men's basketball, football)
- Don Peden, '14 (baseball head coach, football head coach)
- Dutch Trautwein, '38-'49 (men's basketball head coach, football assistant coach)

1966

- Kermit Blosser, '32 (football, wrestling, men's basketball assistant coach, men's golf head coach, wrestling assistant coach)
- M. Harold Brown, '33 (men's basketball, football)
- Blaine Goldsberry, '14 (men's basketball)
- Mark Hendrickson, '19 (baseball, men's basketball)
- Krum Kahler, '08 (baseball)
- Hokie Palmer, '16 (football)

1967

- Herbert Bash, '17 (baseball, men's basketball, football)
- John E. Brammer, '30 (baseball, men's basketball, football)
- Eugene Rinta, '38 (men's basketball)
- Jim Snyder, '41 (men's basketball, football, men's basketball head coach)
- Frank Szalay, '42 (football)
- Jerome Warshower, '31 (baseball, men's basketball, football)
- Bob Wren, '43 (baseball, football, baseball head coach)

1968

- Joseph W. Begala, '29 (football, wrestling)
- Vince Costello, '53 (football)
- John R. Goddard, '17 (baseball, football, men's track and field)
- Angus E. King, '22 (baseball, men's basketball)
- John W. Montgomery, '40 (baseball, football)
- Dick Shrider, '48 (men's basketball)
- Carroll C. Widdoes, '49-'69 (football head coach, tennis head coach, athletics director)

1969

- Sim Earich, '28 (men's basketball, football)
- Dow Finsterwald, '52 (men's golf)
- Bill Hess, '47 (football, wrestling, football head coach)
- Bill Jurkovic, '38 (baseball, football)
- Art Lewis, '36 (football)
- Pete McKinley, '29 (baseball, men's basketball, football)
- Mark Wylie, '49 (baseball)

=== 1970–1979 ===
1970

- Chet F. Adams, '39 (football, wrestling)
- George M. Brown, '31 (baseball, football)
- Carlisle Dollings, '25 (baseball, football)
- Clark B. Gabriel, '32 (football)
- John T. Malokas, '38 (baseball, men's basketball)
- Carl H. Ott, '41 (men's basketball)

1971

- Lester N. Carney, '59 (football, men's track and field)
- Fletcher Gilders, '59-'84 (men's swimming and diving head coach)
- William H. Herbert, '25 (football, men's track and field)
- Len Janiak, '40 (football)
- W.R. "Shorty" McReynolds, '15 (baseball, men's basketball, football)
- Thor Olson, '16-'51 (wrestling head coach)
- Robert A. Snyder, '37 (football)

1972

- Bunk Adams, '61 (men's basketball)
- Harry Houska, '65 (wrestling, wrestling head coach)
- Russell Kepler, '32 (football, men's track and field)
- Dutch Littler, '24 (football)
- Robert "Fizz" Miller, '42 (men's basketball, football)
- Jim Shreffler, '50 (baseball, men's basketball)
- Milt Taylor, '50 (football)
- Gus White, '21 (baseball)

1973

- Elmore Banton, '65 (cross country, track and field/cross country head coach)
- O.C. Bird, '22-'48 (athletics director)
- Joseph W. Colvin, '33 (football)
- Raymond C. Davis, '21 (men's basketball, football)
- Howard E. Jolliff, '65 (men's basketball)
- Dave Solomon, '70 (swimming and diving)
- Woodrow "Woody" Wills, '37 (baseball, football)

1974

- King Brady, '50 (baseball, football)
- Francis "Peg" Fuller, '22 (baseball, men's basketball, football, men's track and field)
- Hal Gruber, '37 (baseball)
- Tom Nevits, '57 (wrestling)
- Dan Risaliti, '41 (football, men's track and field)
- Bill Rohr, '63-'78 (athletics director)

1975

- Robert Brooks, '61 (football)
- Cleve Bryant, '70 (football)
- Joseph Dean, '61 (football, football assistant coach)
- John Eastman, '66 (men's soccer)
- Stan Huntsman, '57-'71 (men's track and field/cross country head coach)
- Fred Schleicher, '47 (football, men's track and field, wrestling)

1976

- Robert Bertelsen, '71 (men's cross country, men's track and field)
- John Frick, '66 (football, football head coach)
- Richard Murphy, '55 (baseball, men's basketball)
- Larry Snyder, '60 (men's golf)
- W. Neal Wade, '70 (swimming and diving)

1977

- Jerry Jackson, '69 (men's basketball)
- Bob Littler, '66 (men's golf)
- Darnell Mitchell, '65 (men's cross country, men's track and field)
- Mike Schmidt, '73 (baseball)
- Todd Snyder, '72 (football)
- Barry Sugden, '65 (men's cross country, men's track and field)
- Bruce Trammell, '71 (wrestling)

1978

- Tom Boyce, '61 (swimming and diving)
- Terry Harmon, '67 (baseball)
- Bob Harrison, '61 (football, men's track and field)
- Don Hilt, '66 (men's basketball)
- Don "Skip" Hoovler, '65 (football)
- Lou Sawchik, '55 (men's basketball, football)

1979

- Ken Carmon, '69 (football)
- Terry Gray, '68 (men's hockey, men's hockey head coach)
- Paul Halleck, '36 (football, men's track and field)
- Lamar Jacobs, '59 (baseball)
- Steve Rudo, '57 (wrestling)
- Wendy Weeden (Devine), '74 (women's field hockey, women's lacrosse)

=== 1980–1989 ===
1980

- John "Rosey" Kerns, '47 (football)
- Anita Corl Miller, '73 (women's field hockey, women's lacrosse)
- Charles Vandlik, '60 (men's golf)
- P.J. Woodworth, '31 (team physician)

1981

- Don Burnison, '36 (baseball, football)
- Fred Picard, '54-'84 (faculty representative)
- Larry Lee Thomas, '62 (baseball)
- Chuck Woodlee, '62 (swimming and diving)
- Edward "Zip" Zednik, '47 (football, wrestling)

1982

- Richard "Rick" Dowswell, '74 (men's track and field)
- Cliff Heffelfinger, '52-'78 (football assistant coach)
- Bob "Hoss" Houmard, '71 (football)
- Robert G. Kappes, '58 (football head coach)
- Frank B. Richey, '47-'73 (football assistant coach)
- Steven E. Swisher, '73 (baseball)
- Donna Jean Taylor, '68 (women's field hockey, cross country, track and field)

1983

- Andy Daniels, '78 (wrestling)
- George R. "Pug" Hood, '38 (men's basketball)
- David Juenger, '73 (football)
- Tom Murphy, '67 (baseball)
- Alfred Ogunfeyimi, '78 (men's track and field)

1984

- John Fekete, '46 (football, men's track and field)
- Bill Frederick, '56 (football)
- Nick Lalich, '38 (men's basketball)
- Ihor Miskewycz, '69 (men's soccer)
- Henry "Tad" Potter, '57 (swimming and diving)

1985

- Bruce Greene, '77 men's track and field
- Al Hart, '58 (athletic trainer)
- David Rambo, '53 (men's golf)
- Barry Reighard, '73 (wrestling)
- Ed Robbins, '70 (baseball)
- Al Scheider, '52 (football)
- Bill Schmidt, '40 (baseball, men's basketball, football)
- Janet Schmitt (McDowell), '68 (women's field hockey, track and field, softball)

1986

- Catherine Brown, '69 (women's field hockey/lacrosse/track and field head coach)
- Roy Cheran, '76 (swimming and diving)
- Dan Donofrio, '37 (football)
- Walter Luckett, '75 (men's basketball)
- Mike Murphy, '69 (baseball)

1987

- Lynn Bozentka (Taylor), '79 (women's field hockey, women's tennis)
- Bob Brenly, '77 (baseball)
- Russ Johnson, '73 (wrestling)
- Pete Lalich, '42 (baseball, men's basketball)
- Eddie Roberts, '73 (men's soccer)
- Joseph "Bull" Sintic, '33 (football)

1988

- Bob Babbitt, '63 (football)
- Roger Gilders, '80 (men's track and field)
- Ken Kowall, '71 (men's basketball)
- Rhonda Rawlins, '82 (women's field hockey, women's lacrosse)
- Dick Smail, '56 (men's golf)
- John Turk, '54 (baseball, football)

1989

- Don Fish, '69 (men's track and field)
- Kathryn MacDonald, '72 (women's basketball, field hockey, lacrosse, track and field))
- Dave Tobik, '76 (baseball)
- Lenny Sadosky, '33 (football, men's track and field)
- Bill Whaley, '62 (men's basketball)

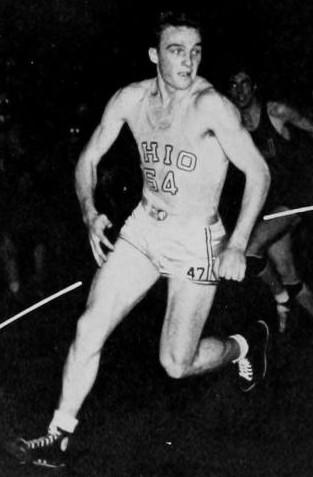
Frank Baumholtz, an inaugural inductee to the Hall

=== 1990–1999 ===
1990

- Lowell "Duke" Anderson, '54 (baseball, football)
- Elden Armbrust, '35 (football, men's track and field)
- Mike Haley, '67 (men's basketball)
- Ernie Kish, '42 (baseball)
- Robert Tscholl, '73 (wrestling)
- Kathy Williams (Thompson), '82 (women's track and field)

1991

- Kevin Babcock, '80 (football)
- John Canine, '70 (men's basketball)
- Frances Daniell (Calcutt), '84 (women's track and field)
- Dick England, '54 (baseball, baseball head coach)
- Ron Fowlkes, '66 (football)
- Caroline Mast (Daugherty), '86 (women's basketball)
- Dave Unik, '69 (wrestling)

1992

- Marti Heckman, '86 women's basketball
- Bill Heller, '65 men's cross country
- Bruce Hosta, '73 (wrestling)
- Craig Love, '71 (men's basketball)
- Dave Moore, '56 (men's golf)
- Dick Schulz, '63 (football)
- Diane Stamm, '79-'85 (women's track and field/cross country head coach)
- Becky Walters (Rafferty), '82 women's field hockey

1993

- Jim Albert, '66 (football)
- John Hrasch, '51 (baseball)
- Sherman Lyle, '73 men's soccer
- Danny Nee, '80-'86 (men's basketball head coach)
- Roger Pedigo, '53 (men's golf)
- Franko Peters, '69 (football)
- Robert Tatum, '86 (men's basketball)

1994

- Henry Clark, '88 (swimming and diving)
- Selina Christian Safari, '86 (women's track and field)
- Mike Echstenkamper, '79 (baseball)
- Dave Leveck, '70 (football)
- Paul Storey, '64 (men's basketball)

1995

- John Bier, '56 (baseball)
- Anne Bolyard, '88 (women's basketball, women's track and field)
- Gail Hudson Ruffins, '84 (women's basketball, women's field hockey, women's lacrosse)
- Dave Jamerson, '90 (men's basketball)
- Gus Malavite, '76 (wrestling)
- Glenn Romanek, '54 (swimming and diving)
- Ted Stute, '63 (baseball, football)

1996

- Kurt Blank, '75 (wrestling)
- Joy Clark, '91 (swimming and diving)
- Roger Hosler, '68 (men's track and field)
- Kevin Priessman, '84 (baseball)
- Shannan Ritchie, '90 (men's cross country, men's track and field)

1997

- Mark Geisler, '80 (football)
- Jane Maher, '83 (women's field hockey, women's lacrosse)
- Tracy Meyer, '89 (women's cross country, women's track and field)

1998
no inductees—induction moved from spring to fall

1999

- Courtney Allen (Asher), '92 (swimming and diving)
- Christine Eby (Axer), '88 (women's field hockey)
- Chris Nichols (Allwine), '91 (women's cross country, women's track and field)
- Darla Dutro, '82 (women's basketball, women's lacrosse)
- Maureen Newlon (Blandford), '92 (swimming and diving)
- Glenn C. Randall, '59 (men's track and field)

=== 2000–2009 ===
2000

- Ronnie Harter, '84 (football)
- Greg Jones, '91 (men's track and field)
- Tim Joyce, '79 (men's basketball)
- Steven D. Skaggs, '80 (men's basketball)
- Mary Catherine Taylor, '86 (women's basketball, women's track and field)

2001

- Marcy Keifer Kennedy, '94 (swimming and diving)
- Eric Kimble, '95 (wrestling)
- Holly Skeen-Gilbert, '95 (women's basketball)

2002

- John Botuchis, '55 (swimming and diving)
- Jeri Pantalone, '85 (women's field hockey)
- Les Ream, '77 (baseball)
- Ned Steele, '71 (swimming and diving)

2003

- Vernon Alden, '62 (university president)
- Orville Dwight Gardner, '98 (wrestling)
- Scott Hammond, '89-'95 (swimming and diving head coach)
- Nicholas "Nick" Karl, '64 (men's golf)
- Lisa MacNicol (Mitchell), '97 (swimming and diving)

2004

- Paul Baron, '86 (men's basketball)
- Staci Bellville, '96 (softball)
- Shawn Enright, '99 (wrestling)
- David "Bucky" Wagner, ‘61 (football)

2005

- Lewis Geter, '93 (men's basketball)
- Joshua Ritchie, '98 (men's cross country, men's track and field)

2006

- Bart Leahy, '98 (baseball)
- Amy Lockard, '93 (swimming and diving)
- Harold McElhaney, (athletics director)

2007

- Dick Schorr, ’67-’98 (broadcaster)
- Dave Zastudil, ’01 (football)
- Joe Zychowicz, ’72 (wrestling)

2008

- Jackie Conrad, '99 (women's cross country, women's track and field)
- Geno Ford, ’97 (men's basketball)
- Jen Morris, ’99 (softball)

2009

- Ron Fenik, '59 (men's football)
- Gwynn Gordon, '90 (women's swimming and diving)
- Cathy Silvia, '91 (women's swimming and diving)
- Bill Toadvine, '71 (men's baseball coach)

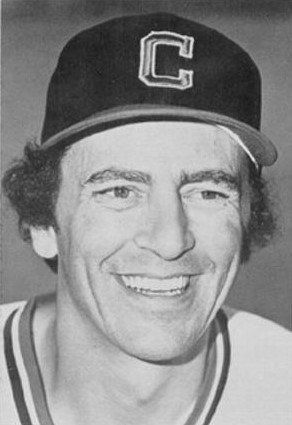
2013 inductee Joe Nossek

=== 2010–2019 ===
2010

- Michael Arbinger, '02 (men's baseball)
- Joe Carbone, '70 (men's baseball, men's baseball head coach)
- Julie Cole, '75 (women's basketball, women's golf)
- Jake Percival, '05 (men's wrestling)

2011

- Emmett Taylor, (men's track and field)
- Alexandra Johnstone, '01 (women's field hockey)
- Robert Moock, '71 (men's golf)

2012

- Hollie Bonewit-Cron, '00 (women's swimming and diving)
- Richard Grecni, '60 (men's football)
- Gary Trent, (men's basketball)
- 1960 Ohio Football Team, (men's football)

2013

- Laura Cobb, '04 (women's volleyball)
- Joe Nossek, '61 (men's baseball)
- Bryan Oswald, '98 (men's wrestling)

2014

- Anthony Gressick, '08 (men's baseball)
- Scott Mayle, '07 (men's football, men's track and field)
- Kim van Selm, '02 (women's swimming and diving)
- Mike Schuler, '62 (men's basketball)

2015

- Briana Adamovsky, '04 (women's volleyball)
- Dion Byrum, '06 (men's football)
- Joanne Park, '00 (women's swimming and diving)
- Bob Willet, '66 (men's baseball)

2016

- Ellen Herman, '09 (women's volleyball)
- Samuel Shon, '81 (men's football)
- Tim Courtad, '00 (men's wrestling)
- Criss Somerlot, '69 (Lifetime Achievement)

2017

- Ben Crabtree, '06 (men's baseball)
- Lauren Mazziotto, '02 (women's field hockey)
- Kalvin McRae, '11 (men's football)
- Charles "Skip" Vosler, (athletic trainer; Lifetime Achievement)

2018

- Melissa Griffin, '08 (women's volleyball)
- Tiffany Horvath, '07 (women's soccer)
- Marc Krauss, '17 (men's baseball)
- 1968 Football Team, (men's football)

2019

- Larry Hunter, '71 & '73 (men's basketball head coach; Lifetime Achievement)
- Ryan Kyes, '01 (men's baseball)
- Tyler Tettleton, '13 (men's football)
- Julia Winfield, '06 (women's volleyball)

=== 2020–present ===
2020

- Geoff Carlston, (women's volleyball head coach)
- Jennifer Scholl, '93 (Swimming and Diving)
- 1970 baseball team (men's baseball)

2021
2022

- Brandon Hunter (Men's Basketball 1999–2003)
- Kelly Lamberti (Volleyball, 2011–14)
- Andy Smiles (Soccer, 1970–73)
- Frank Solich (Football coach, 2005–20)
- 1964 Men's Cross Country Team

2023

- Matt Engleka (Baseball, 1992-95)
- Jack Leveck (Football, 1968-71)
- Savannah Jo (Dorsey) Seigneur (Softball, 2013-17)

2024

- Juli Accurso (Women's Cross Country/Track & Field, 2011-14)
- Emily (Bresser) Hobel (Women's Swim & Dive, 1997-2001)
- Jeremy Johnson (Wrestling, 2010-14)
- 1975 Softball Team

2025

- 2004 & 2005 Volleyball Teams
- Cody Walters '16 - Wrestling
- Rudy Rott '19 – Baseball
- Carime Reinhart '08 - Women's Cross Country/Track & Field

2026

- Douglas Grebe '99 – Swimming & Diving
- Germane Lindsey '11 – Wrestling
- Torrie Albini '08 – Field Hockey
- Joshua Sorge '96 – Baseball
- Don Caldwell '73 – Football
