= Pinky Woods =

American baseball player (1920–1982)

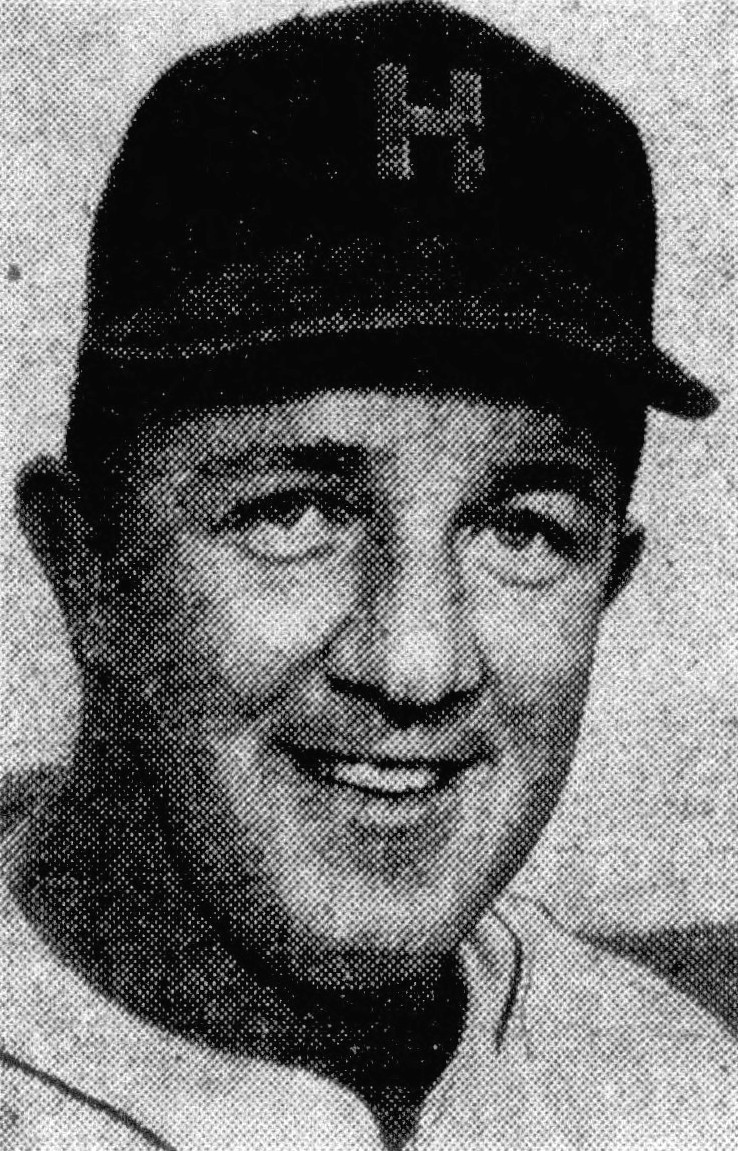
- Woods, circa 1950
- Pitcher
- Born: May 22, 1920; Waterbury, Connecticut, US
- Died: October 30, 1982 (aged 62); Los Angeles, California, US
- Batted: Right Threw: Right

MLB debut
- June 20, 1943, for the Boston Red Sox

Last MLB appearance
- September 23, 1945, for the Boston Red Sox

MLB statistics
- Win–loss record: 13–21
- Earned run average: 3.97
- Strikeouts: 124
- Stats at Baseball Reference

Teams
- Boston Red Sox (1943–1945)

George Rowland "Pinky" Woods (May 22, 1920 – October 30, 1982) was an American professional baseball pitcher. He played all or part of three seasons in Major League Baseball for the Boston Red Sox from 1943 to 1945. A native of Waterbury, Connecticut, the right-hander was measured during his playing career at 6 ft 5 in (1.96 m) and 225 lbs.

Woods is one of many ballplayers who only appeared in the major leagues during World War II. In his three seasons with Boston he appeared in 85 games, starting a little more than half of them.

He made his major league debut on June 20, 1943, starting game 2 of a doubleheader against the Philadelphia Athletics at Shibe Park. He did not get a decision in the 6-5 Red Sox victory. His first big league win came on July 23, in relief, against the Chicago White Sox in game 1 of a Fenway Park doubleheader. He finished his rookie year 5–6 with a 4.92 ERA.

His best season was 1944. Even though his record was just 4–8, he pitched a career-high 170.2 innings and had his lowest earned run average (3.27) and lowest WHIP (1.518). His 38 pitching appearances ranked tenth in the American League. His finest major league pitching effort also occurred during this season. On June 14 in game 2 of a home doubleheader, he hurled a complete game shutout against the Philadelphia Athletics, winning by a score of 5–0. The losing pitcher was All-Star right-hander Russ Christopher.

During his three-year career Woods completed 10 of 44 starts, had a 13–21 record, 25 games finished, 3 saves, and an ERA of 3.97. In 378.2 innings pitched he struck out 124 and walked 206. Good with the bat and glove, he hit .190 (24-for-126) and handled 112 out of 115 total chances in the field successfully for a fielding percentage of .974.

Woods died at the age of 62 in Los Angeles.
