= Otey Clark =

American baseball player (1915–2010)

- Pitcher
- Born: May 22, 1915; Boscobel, Wisconsin, U.S.
- Died: October 20, 2010 (aged 95); Boscobel, Wisconsin, U.S.
- Batted: Right Threw: Right

MLB debut
- April 17, 1945, for the Boston Red Sox

Last MLB appearance
- September 30, 1945, for the Boston Red Sox

MLB statistics
- Win–loss record: 4–4
- Earned run average: 3.07
- Strikeouts: 20
- Stats at Baseball Reference

Teams
- Boston Red Sox (1945)

William Otis "Otey" Clark (May 22, 1915 – October 20, 2010) was an American Major League Baseball pitcher who played for the Boston Red Sox in 1945. He was born in Boscobel, Wisconsin. The 29-year-old rookie stood 6-foot 1 1/2 inches and weighed 190 pounds.

Clark is one of many ballplayers who only appeared in the major leagues during World War II. He made his major league debut on April 17, 1945, (Opening Day), pitching in relief against the New York Yankees at Yankee Stadium. His finest pitching effort that season came on September 19 in the second game of a doubleheader at Fenway Park. He hurled a complete game shutout against the Philadelphia Athletics, winning by a score of 3–0.

Clark also defeated Bob Feller in the 1945 season, in Feller's first game back in baseball following World War II.

Season and career totals include a record of 4–4 in 12 games pitched, nine games started, four complete games, one shutout, three games finished and an ERA of 3.07 in 82 innings pitched. He struck out 20 and walked 19. Also good with the bat and glove, Clark hit .208 (5-for-24) and handled 11 chances in the field without an error.

One day before appearing in the 1945 season opener, Clark pitched to Jackie Robinson in the latter's tryout for the Boston Red Sox.

At the time of his death in Boscobel, Wisconsin, on October 20, 2010, he was considered one of the oldest living former MLB players.
