= Rex Cecil =

American baseball player (1916–1966)

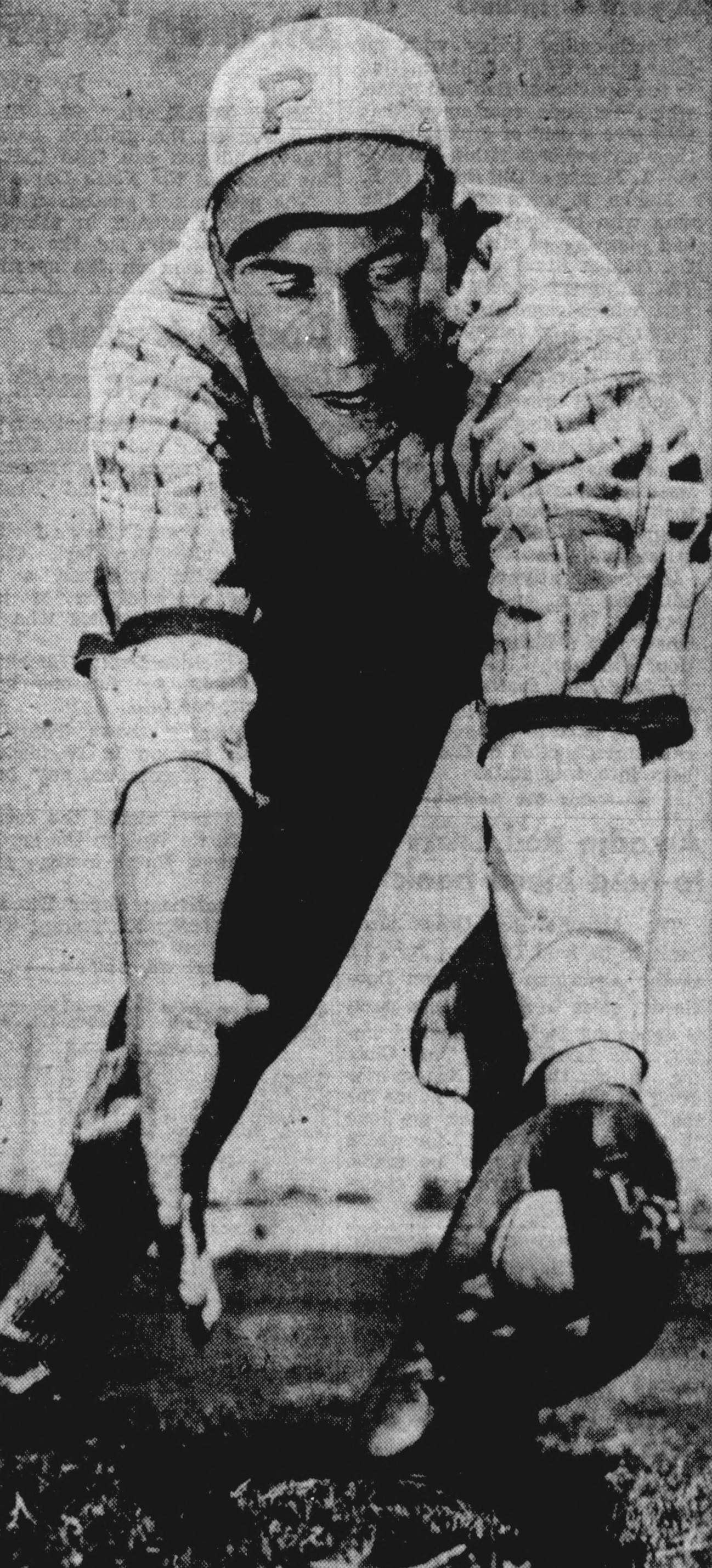
- Cecil, circa 1945
- Pitcher
- Born: October 8, 1916; Lindsay, Oklahoma, U.S.
- Died: October 30, 1966 (aged 50); Long Beach, California, U.S.
- Batted: Left Threw: Right

MLB debut
- August 13, 1944, for the Boston Red Sox

Last MLB appearance
- May 28, 1945, for the Boston Red Sox

MLB statistics
- Win–loss record: 6–10
- Earned run average: 5.18
- Innings pitched: 106
- Stats at Baseball Reference

Teams
- Boston Red Sox (1944–1945)

Rex Ralston Cecil (October 8, 1916 – October 30, 1966) was an American professional baseball player. The right-handed pitcher, a native of Lindsay, Oklahoma, had a 14-year pro career, including 18 games pitched, 16 as a starter, in Major League Baseball for the Boston Red Sox (1944–1945). Cecil batted left-handed, stood 6 feet 3 inches (1.91 m) tall and weighed 195 pounds (88 kg).

Cecil's early pro career (1937–1939; 1941–1944) was based on the West Coast, especially in the Western International and Pacific Coast leagues. In 1944, during the peak of the World War II manpower shortage, Cecil won 19 of 30 decisions, with a stellar 2.16 earned run average, for the PCL San Diego Padres and was acquired by the Red Sox.

Making his Major League debut on August 13, 1944, in relief against the eventual American League champion St. Louis Browns at Fenway Park, Cecil threw four scoreless innings and earned the victory when Baseball Hall of Fame second baseman Bobby Doerr hit a walk-off home run in the 13th inning. He then threw successive complete games as a starting pitcher, against the Detroit Tigers and Cleveland Indians, and split two decisions. During his rookie campaign for Boston, Cecil won four games, lost five and compiled a 5.11 earned run average.

In 1945, Cecil began the year with the BoSox and was Boston's Opening Day starting pitcher on April 17 against the New York Yankees at Yankee Stadium. Cecil lasted 6 1/3 innings and allowed eight runs — although only two were earned, as he was victimized by three errors by first baseman Catfish Metkovich and made one miscue himself. New York won the game, 8–4. He started six more games during April and May, but in his seven 1945 starts he lost five, won two, and again compiled a high earned run average, at 5.20. He then was demoted to Boston's top farm team, the Louisville Colonels of the American Association, and spent the rest of his pro career in the minors.

In a two-season Major League career, Cecil posted a 6–10 record with 63 strikeouts and a 5.18 ERA in 106 innings pitched, allowing 118 hits and 60 bases on balls. During his long minor league career, he won 161 games, including 21 games in his final pro season, 1953, in the Class C Arizona–Texas League.

Rex Cecil died in Long Beach, California, at the age of 50.

== See also ==
- Boston Red Sox all-time roster
