= Red Steiner =

American baseball player (1915–2001)

- Steiner with the Boston Red Sox, c. 1945
- Catcher
- Born: January 7, 1915; Los Angeles, California, US
- Died: November 16, 2001 (aged 86); Gardena, California, US
- Batted: Left Threw: Right

MLB debut
- May 11, 1945, for the Cleveland Indians

Last MLB appearance
- September 29, 1945, for the Boston Red Sox

MLB statistics
- Batting average: .190
- Home runs: 0
- Runs batted in: 6
- Stats at Baseball Reference

Teams
- Cleveland Indians (1945); Boston Red Sox (1945)

James Harry "Red" Steiner (January 7, 1915 – November 16, 2001) was an American professional baseball catcher. He played a total of 38 games in Major League Baseball during 1945 for the Cleveland Indians and Boston Red Sox. Listed at 6 feet 0 inches (1.83 m) and 185 pounds (84 kg), he batted left-handed and threw right-handed.

== Biography ==
Steiner played for various minor league teams from 1934 to 1944, then one final season with the Sacramento Solons of the Pacific Coast League in 1950; he appeared in a total of 1165 minor league games.

Steiner was one of many players who only appeared in the major leagues during World War II. During the 1945 season, he played 12 games for the Cleveland Indians, had his contract sold for $7500 on August 10, and then played 26 games for the Boston Red Sox. Overall, he was 15-for-79 at the plate for a .190 batting average, with no home runs and six RBIs. In 28 catching appearances, he posted a .989 fielding percentage (one error in 91 chances).

Steiner additionally played in the Mexican League during 1946, 1947, and 1949.

Steiner was a native of Los Angeles, California. He died in Gardena, California, at the age of 86 in 2001.
