= Woody Crowson =

American baseball player (1918–1947)

- Pitcher
- Born: September 9, 1918; Fuquay Springs, North Carolina
- Died: August 14, 1947 (aged 28); Greensboro, North Carolina
- Batted: Right Threw: Right

MLB debut
- April 17, 1945, for the Philadelphia Athletics

Last MLB appearance
- April 17, 1945, for the Philadelphia Athletics

MLB statistics (through 1945)
- Win–loss record: 0–0
- Earned run average: 6.00
- Strikeouts: 2
- Stats at Baseball Reference

Teams
- Philadelphia Athletics (1945)

Thomas Woodrow Crowson (September 9, 1918 – August 14, 1947) was an American professional baseball pitcher who played in Major League Baseball for the Philadelphia Athletics during the 1945 season. He died at age 28, while playing for the Greensboro Patriots, after the team bus he was on was sideswiped by a melon truck.
