= Larry Drake (baseball) =

American baseball player (1921-1985)

- Outfielder / Pinch hitter
- Born: May 4, 1921; McKinney, Texas, U.S.
- Died: July 14, 1985 (aged 64); Houston, Texas, U.S.
- Batted: Left Threw: Right

MLB debut
- July 20, 1945, for the Philadelphia Athletics

Last MLB appearance
- September 10, 1948, for the Washington Senators

MLB statistics
- Batting average: .222
- Hits: 2
- Runs batted in: 1
- Stats at Baseball Reference

Teams
- Philadelphia Athletics (1945); Washington Senators (1948)

Larry Francis Drake (May 5, 1921 – July 14, 1985) was an American professional baseball player who played for eight seasons (1941–1942; 1944–1949), mostly at the minor league level. He appeared in five Major League games as an outfielder and pinch hitter for the Philadelphia Athletics (1945) and Washington Senators (1948). The native of McKinney, Texas, batted left-handed, threw right-handed, stood 6 feet 1 inch (1.85 m) tall and weighed 195 pounds (88 kg). He attended Baylor University.

Drake played in one game for Philadelphia during the 1945 season, the last year of the World War II manpower shortage. He started the July 20 game against the Cleveland Indians in left field and struck out in his only two at bats before being replaced by a right-handed pinch hitter. He then returned to the minor leagues. Then, in 1948, he was recalled by Washington in September from the Double-A Southern Association and appeared in four games against his old team, the Athletics. On September 10, he started in right field and collected his only two Major League hits (both singles off Dick Fowler) and lone big-league run batted in, as the Athletics prevailed, 9–6.

In his five MLB games, Drake had 11 plate appearances and nine official at bats. He scored no runs, drew one base on balls and was credited with one sacrifice hit. He handled five total chances in the field without an error.
