= Vic Johnson (baseball) =

American baseball player (1920–2005)

- Pitcher
- Born: August 3, 1920; Eau Claire, Wisconsin, U.S.
- Died: May 10, 2005 (aged 84); Eau Claire, Wisconsin, U.S.
- Batted: Right Threw: Left

MLB debut
- May 3, 1944, for the Boston Red Sox

Last MLB appearance
- June 11, 1946, for the Cleveland Indians

MLB statistics
- Win–loss record: 6–8
- Strikeouts: 31
- Earned run average: 5.06
- Stats at Baseball Reference

Teams
- Boston Red Sox (1944–1945); Cleveland Indians (1946)

Victor Oscar Johnson (August 3, 1920 – May 10, 2005) was an American pitcher who played in Major League Baseball from 1944 through 1946 for the Boston Red Sox and Cleveland Indians. Listed at 6 ft 0 in (1.83 m), 160 lb., Johnson batted right-handed and threw left-handed. He was born in Eau Claire, Wisconsin.

In a three-season career, Johnson posted a 6–8 record with a 5.06 ERA in 42 appearances, including 15 starts, four complete games, one shutout, two saves, and 31 strikeouts in 126⅓ total innings of work. He was traded by Boston to Cleveland on December 12, 1945, with cash for Jim Bagby and made nine appearances for Cleveland before retiring.

Johnson died in his hometown of Eau Claire, Wisconsin at age 84.
