= Bob Garbark =

American athlete and coach (1909–1990)

- Catcher
- Born: November 13, 1909; Houston, Texas, U.S.
- Died: August 15, 1990 (aged 80); Meadville, Pennsylvania, U.S.
- Batted: Right Threw: Right

MLB debut
- September 3, 1934, for the Cleveland Indians

Last MLB appearance
- August 19, 1945, for the Boston Red Sox

MLB statistics
- Batting average: .248
- Hits: 81
- Runs batted in: 28
- Stats at Baseball Reference

Teams
- Cleveland Indians (1934–1935); Chicago Cubs (1937–1939); Philadelphia Athletics (1944); Boston Red Sox (1945)

Robert Michael Garbark (November 13, 1909 – August 15, 1990) was an American football and baseball player and coach of football, basketball, and baseball. He played Major League Baseball as a catcher with the Cleveland Indians, Chicago Cubs, Philadelphia Athletics, and Boston Red Sox. Garbark made his Major League debut on September 3, 1934 with the Indians. Garbark's brother, Mike, also played professionally and had the same batting average (.261) as Bob in 1944.

Although posting only a .248 batting average (81-for-327) with no home runs and 28 RBI in his seven year major league career, he was strong defensively, recording a .996 fielding percentage with only two errors in 446 total chances over 135 games (134 games at catcher and one game at first base).

Garbark coached baseball at his alma mater, Allegheny College, for 32 seasons (1947–1978), compiling a record of 282–201–3. He also coached football for a season at Allegheny in 1946, tallying a mark of 1–6, and basketball at the school for 19 seasons, from 1943 to 1962, amassing a record of 125–204. Garbark played on the football team at Allegheny as a fullback from 1929 to 1932. He was captain of the football team in 1931 and co-captain in 1932.

== Head coaching record ==
=== Football ===
Year	Team	Overall	Conference	Standing	Bowl/playoffs
Allegheny Gators (Independent) (1946)
1946	Allegheny	1–6			
Allegheny:		1–6			
Total:		1–6			
