= Frank Barrett (baseball) =

American baseball player (1913–1998)

- Pitcher
- Born: July 1, 1913; Fort Lauderdale, Florida, U.S.
- Died: March 6, 1998 (aged 84); Leesburg, Florida, U.S.
- Batted: Right Threw: Right

MLB debut
- October 1, 1939, for the St. Louis Cardinals

Last MLB appearance
- September 15, 1950, for the Pittsburgh Pirates

MLB statistics
- Win–loss record: 15–17
- Earned run average: 3.51
- Strikeouts: 90
- Stats at Baseball Reference

Teams
- St. Louis Cardinals (1939); Boston Red Sox (1944–1945); Boston Braves (1946); Pittsburgh Pirates (1950)

Francis Joseph Barrett (July 1, 1913 – March 6, 1998) was an American professional baseball player. He was a relief pitcher for the St. Louis Cardinals, Boston Red Sox, Boston Braves, and Pittsburgh Pirates.

In five seasons, Barrett had a win–loss record of 15–17 in 104 games, two of them starts. He finished 67 games, compiling 12 saves, 217 2/3 innings pitched, 211 hits allowed, 100 runs allowed, 85 earned runs allowed, 8 home runs allowed, 90 walks, 90 strikeouts, 8 wild pitches, 924 batters faced and a 3.51 ERA.

Afterwards, Barrett coached and managed n the Minor Leagues.
