= Ben Steiner =

American baseball player (1921–1988)

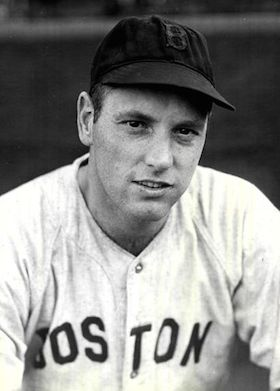
- Second baseman
- Born: July 28, 1921; Alexandria, Virginia, U.S.
- Died: October 27, 1988 (aged 67); Venice, Florida, U.S.
- Batted: Left Threw: Right

MLB debut
- April 17, 1945, for the Boston Red Sox

Last MLB appearance
- April 21, 1947, for the Detroit Tigers

MLB statistics
- Batting average: .256
- Home runs: 3
- Runs batted in: 20
- Stats at Baseball Reference

Teams
- Boston Red Sox (1945–1946); Detroit Tigers (1947)

Benjamin Saunders Steiner (July 28, 1921 – October 27, 1988) was an American professional baseball player. A second baseman, he appeared in 82 games in Major League Baseball between 1945 and 1947 for the Boston Red Sox (1945–1946) and Detroit Tigers (1947). Steiner, born in Alexandria, Virginia, attended Central High School in Washington, D.C., and North Carolina State University. He was listed at 5 feet 11 inches (1.80 m), 165 pounds (75 kg); he batted left-handed and threw right-handed.

In a three-season career, Steiner was a .256 hitter (79-for-308) with three home runs and 20 RBI in 82 games, including 41 runs, eight doubles, three triples, 10 stolen bases, and a .326 on-base percentage.

In the 1970s he served as the assistant county clerk of Middlesex County, New Jersey, and wore his ring from the 1950 Junior World Series, in which his Columbus Red Birds, champions of the American Association, defeated the Baltimore Orioles, champions of the International League.

Steiner died in Venice, Florida, at the age of 67.
