= Loyd Christopher =

American baseball player (1919–1991)

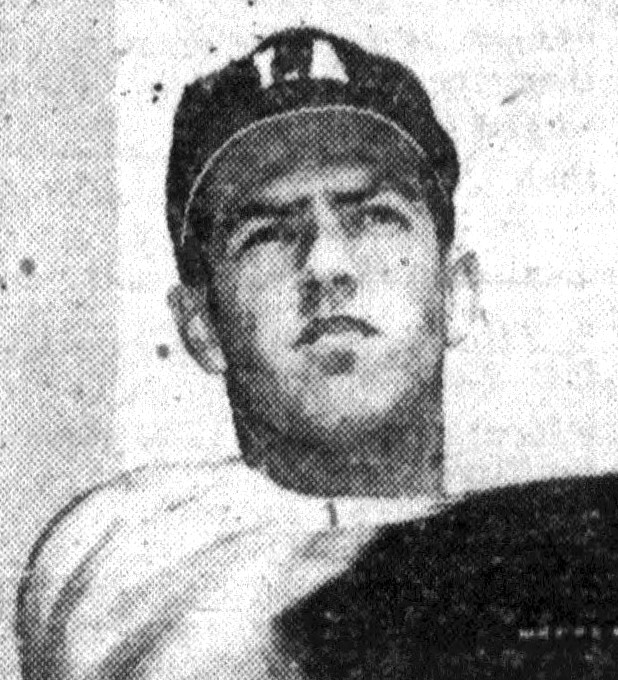
- Christoper, circa 1946
- Outfielder
- Born: December 31, 1919; Richmond, California, U.S.
- Died: September 5, 1991 (aged 71); Richmond, California, U.S.
- Batted: Right Threw: Right

MLB debut
- April 20, 1945, for the Boston Red Sox

Last MLB appearance
- May 13, 1947, for the Chicago White Sox

MLB statistics
- Batting average: .243
- Home runs: 0
- Runs batted in: 4
- Stats at Baseball Reference

Teams
- Boston Red Sox (1945); Chicago Cubs (1945); Chicago White Sox (1947)

Loyd Eugene Christopher (December 31, 1919 – September 5, 1991) was an American professional baseball player and scout. During his on-field career (1938–1952; 1955), he was an outfielder who appeared in Major League Baseball for 16 games for the Boston Red Sox (1945), Chicago Cubs (1945) and Chicago White Sox (1947). The native of Richmond, California, stood 6 feet 2 inches (1.88 m) tall and weighed 190 pounds (86 kg), and threw and batted right-handed. His brother Russ Christopher was a Major League pitcher.

In the Majors, Loyd Christopher collected nine hits in 37 at bats for a batting average of .243, with one triple, four runs batted in, five runs scored, and an on-base percentage of .333. In the field he recorded 24 putouts, one assist, no errors and participated in one double play.

In the Minors, Christopher played a total of 16 seasons, including 13 seasons at the highest (Double-A, then Triple-A) level, from 1940 through 1952. One of his best seasons was 1946, when he played 158 games for the Los Angeles Angels, batted .304, and hit 26 home runs to lead the Pacific Coast League in that category.

After his playing career, Christopher became a scout based in Northern California for the Cincinnati Reds, Kansas City Athletics, Cleveland Indians, Montreal Expos and California Angels, signing players such as future Baseball Hall of Famer Dennis Eckersley, Dick Tidrow, Carney Lansford, Larry Andersen, Gary Pettis, Steve Dunning and Ron Romanick.

Christopher died in his hometown of Richmond at the age of 71.
