= Steve Gerkin =

American baseball player (1912–1978)

- Pitcher
- Born: November 19, 1912; Grafton, West Virginia, U.S.
- Died: November 9, 1978 (aged 65); Bay Pines, Florida, U.S.
- Batted: Right Threw: Right

MLB debut
- May 13, 1945, for the Philadelphia Athletics

Last MLB appearance
- August 10, 1945, for the Philadelphia Athletics

MLB statistics
- Win–loss record: 0–12
- Earned run average: 3.62
- Strikeouts: 25
- Stats at Baseball Reference

Teams
- Philadelphia Athletics (1934)

Stephen Paul Gerkin (November 19, 1912 – November 9, 1978) was an American right-handed pitcher in Major League Baseball who played for the Philadelphia Athletics of the American League in its 1945 season.

Born in Grafton, West Virginia, Gerkin entered professional baseball a little late in his life. As a 32-year-old rookie, Gerkin was one of many minor league ballplayers who only appeared in the major leagues during wartime.

Gerkin debuted with Class-B Lancaster Red Roses in 1943, where he had a record of 20-11, tying for the most wins in the Interstate League, helping his team clinch the league pennant and the play-off championship. He was also selected for the All-Star Team. Afterwards, he would miss the 1944 season while serving in the United States Army during World War II. After his discharge from military, he was obtained by the Athletics from Lancaster as part of a minor league working agreement late in 1944.

Although he pitched in the majors for only one year, Gerkin was the longtime holder of one of baseball's least coveted records, as he recorded 12 losses without a single win in the season. No pitcher in MLB amassed as many losses in a winless season until Terry Felton went 0–13 for the Minnesota Twins in the 1982 season.

Gerkin still holds the record for most quality starts in a career (7) without recording a win. He held the record for most career games started (12) without a win until 2021, when he was passed by Johan Oviedo. If Oviedo wins a game, the record will be shared by Gerkin and Paul Brown of the Philadelphia Phillies, who did it in 1962.

Nevertheless, Gerkin had a decent career in the minors while playing for various MLB affiliate teams and in the Mexican League, posting an overall record of 71-43 with a 3.96 ERA in a span of six seasons from 1943–1953. He never had a losing season.

His most productive season came in 1947, when he went 10–2 for Triple-A Minneapolis Millers and earned the American Association MVP Award.

In between, Gerkin played winterball for the Tigres de Marianao and Leones del Habana clubs of the Cuban League in the 1947-1948 season.

Gerkin finished his baseball career in 1953 at the age of 40. He then became a chef in Maryland before retiring in 1968 to Bay Pines, Florida, where he became a long time resident.

Gerkin died in 1978, at Veterans Hospital in Bay Pines, eleven days short of his 66th birthday.
