= Johnny Lazor =

American baseball player (1912–2002)

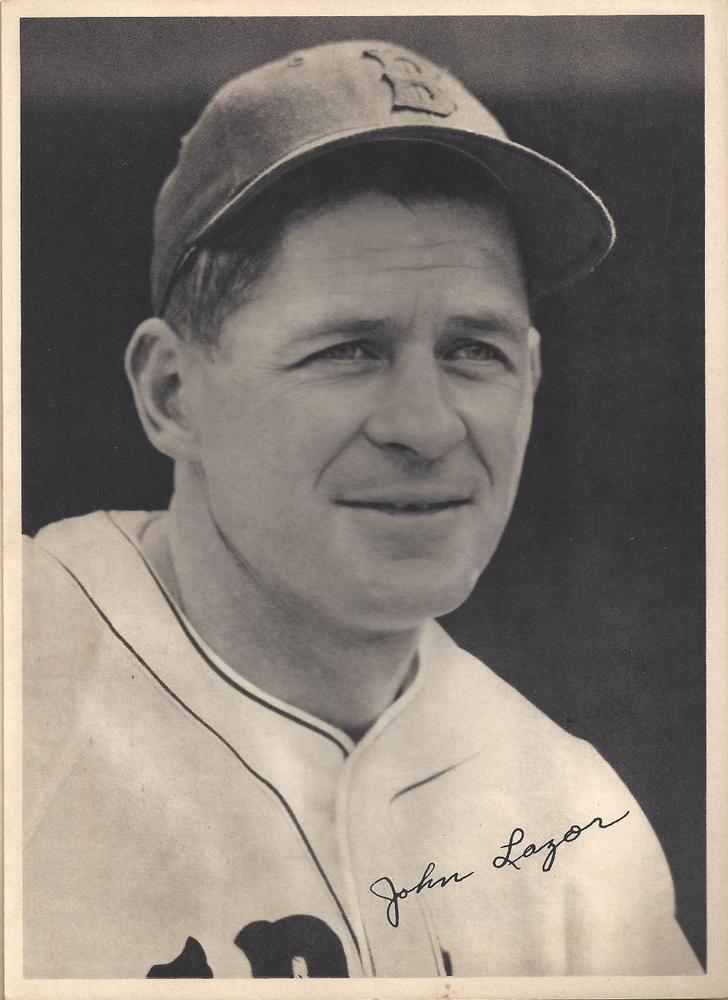
- Outfielder
- Born: September 9, 1912; Taylor, Washington, U.S.
- Died: December 9, 2002 (aged 90); Renton, Washington, U.S.
- Batted: Left Threw: Right

MLB debut
- April 22, 1943, for the Boston Red Sox

Last MLB appearance
- September 29, 1946, for the Boston Red Sox

MLB statistics
- Batting average: .263
- Home runs: 6
- Runs batted in: 62
- Stats at Baseball Reference

Teams
- Boston Red Sox (1943–1946)

John Paul Lazor (September 9, 1912 – December 9, 2002) was an American backup outfielder in Major League Baseball who played from 1943 through 1946 for the Boston Red Sox (1943–1946). Born in King County, Washington, he batted left-handed and threw right-handed.

Lazor provided four years of good services for the Red Sox while left fielder Ted Williams and center fielder Dom DiMaggio were in the military service. His most productive season came in 1945, when he posted career-highs in games played (101), batting average (.310), runs scored (35), runs batted in (45), doubles (19) and home runs (5).

In a four-season career, Lazor was a .263 hitter with six home runs and 62 RBI in 224 games. He finished his professional career with the Portland Beavers of the Pacific Coast League, playing for them 280 games from 1947 to 1949.

Lazor died in Renton, Washington at the age of 90. Until the Red Sox signed J.T. Snow, who wore 84 in 2006, Lazor had worn the highest number in Red Sox history. Lazor previously had worn number 82 in 1943. In a December 2001 interview, Lazor said he did not know why he wore the number and claimed he thought he wore the number 29. Snow was later surpassed by Alfredo Aceves in 2011 for highest number worn in Red Sox history (Aceves wore number 91).
