= 1944 Detroit Tigers season =

Major League Baseball season

1944 Detroit Tigers
- League: American League
- Ballpark: Briggs Stadium
- City: Detroit
- Record: 88–66 (.571)
- League place: 2nd
- Owners: Walter Briggs, Sr.
- General managers: Jack Zeller
- Managers: Steve O'Neill
- Radio: WXYZ (Harry Heilmann)

In 1944, the Detroit Tigers finished second in the American League with a record of 88–66, just one game behind the first place St. Louis Browns.

== Offseason ==
- October 11, 1943: Rip Radcliff was traded by the Tigers to the Philadelphia Athletics for Don Heffner and Bob Swift.
- Prior to 1944 season: Joe Ginsberg was signed as an amateur free agent by the Tigers.

== Regular season ==
On April 19, first baseman Rudy York recorded his 1,000th career hit.

On September 17, the Tigers found themselves in first place for the first time all season. The Yankees lost two games to the Athletics, while the Browns split two games with the White Sox. With the Tigers sweeping Cleveland, the Tigers jumped over the Yankees and Browns for first place. The Browns were a half game back, while the Yankees were two games back. At the end of twelve games from that day, the Tigers were in or tied for first place, which included being tied on the penultimate day on September 30 with St. Louis. On October 1, Detroit lost to Washington 4-1 while St. Louis defeated New York 5–2 to clinch the pennant.

=== Season standings ===
American League
Team	W	L	Pct.	GB	Home	Road
St. Louis Browns	89	65	.578	—	54‍–‍23	35‍–‍42
Detroit Tigers	88	66	.571	1	43‍–‍34	45‍–‍32
New York Yankees	83	71	.539	6	47‍–‍31	36‍–‍40
Boston Red Sox	77	77	.500	12	47‍–‍30	30‍–‍47
Cleveland Indians	72	82	.468	17	39‍–‍38	33‍–‍44
Philadelphia Athletics	72	82	.468	17	39‍–‍37	33‍–‍45
Chicago White Sox	71	83	.461	18	41‍–‍36	30‍–‍47
Washington Senators	64	90	.416	25	40‍–‍37	24‍–‍53

=== Record vs. opponents ===
1944 American League record Sources:
Team	BOS	CWS	CLE	DET	NYY	PHA	SLB	WSH
Boston	—	17–5	8–14	10–12–2	11–11	11–11	10–12	10–12
Chicago	5–17	—	14–8	9–13	10–12	9–13	8–14	16–6
Cleveland	14–8	8–14	—	10–12	8–14	12–10–1	10–12	10–12
Detroit	12–10–2	13–9	12–10	—	14–8	11–11	9–13	17–5
New York	11–11	12–10	14–8	8–14	—	13–9	10–12	15–7
Philadelphia	11–11	13–9	10–12–1	11–11	9–13	—	9–13	9–13
St. Louis	12–10	14–8	12–10	13–9	12–10	13–9	—	13–9
Washington	12–10	6–16	12–10	5–17	7–15	13–9	9–13	—

=== Roster ===
1944 Detroit Tigers
Roster
Pitchers: 23 Boom-Boom Beck; 17,25 Zeb Eaton; 12 Rufe Gentry; 17 Bob Gillespie; 15 Johnny Gorsica; 21 Roy Henshaw; 2 Elon Hogsett; 5 Jake Mooty; 16 Hal Newhouser; 14 Joe Orrell; 19 Stubby Overmire; 11 Dizzy Trout	Catchers: 22 Hack Miller; 9 Paul Richards; 1 Bob Swift; Infielders: 7,35 Red Borom; 25 Bubba Floyd; 5 Don Heffner; 6 Pinky Higgins; 7,24 Joe Hoover; 3 Eddie Mayo; 24 Joe Orengo; 18 Jackie Sullivan; 30 Al Unser; 4 Rudy York	Outfielders: 8 Doc Cramer; 26 Chuck Hostetler; 21 Charlie Metro; 27 Jimmy Outlaw; 20 Don Ross; 2 Dick Wakefield; Other batters: 25 John McHale	Manager: 32 Steve O'Neill; Coaches: 28 Art Mills; 31 Al Vincent

== Player stats ==
=== Batting ===
==== Starters by position ====
Note: Pos = Position; G = Games played; AB = At bats; H = Hits; Avg. = Batting average; HR = Home runs; RBI = Runs batted in

Pos	Player	G	AB	H	Avg.	HR	RBI
C	Paul Richards	95	300	71	.237	3	37
1B	Rudy York	151	583	161	.276	18	98
2B	Eddie Mayo	154	607	151	.249	5	63
SS	Joe Hoover	120	441	104	.236	0	29
3B	Pinky Higgins	148	543	161	.297	7	76
OF	Doc Cramer	143	578	169	.292	2	42
OF	Jimmy Outlaw	139	535	146	.273	3	57
OF	Dick Wakefield	78	276	98	.355	12	53

==== Other batters ====
Note: G = Games played; AB = At bats; H = Hits; Avg. = Batting average; HR = Home runs; RBI = Runs batted in

Player	G	AB	H	Avg.	HR	RBI
Chuck Hostetler	90	265	79	.298	0	20
Bob Swift	80	247	63	.255	1	19
Don Ross	66	167	35	.210	2	15
Joe Orengo	46	154	31	.201	0	10
Charlie Metro	38	78	15	.192	0	5
Al Unser	11	25	3	.120	1	5
Don Heffner	6	19	4	.211	0	1
Red Borom	7	14	1	.071	0	1
Bubba Floyd	3	9	4	.444	0	0
Hack Miller	6	5	1	.200	1	3
John McHale	1	1	0	.000	0	0
Jackie Sullivan	1	1	0	.000	0	0

=== Pitching ===
==== Starting pitchers ====
Note: G = Games pitched; IP = Innings pitched; W = Wins; L = Losses; ERA = Earned run average; SO = Strikeouts

Player	G	IP	W	L	ERA	SO
Dizzy Trout	49	352.1	27	14	2.12	144
Hal Newhouser	47	312.1	29	9	2.22	187
Rufe Gentry	37	203.2	12	14	4.24	68
Stubby Overmire	32	199.2	11	11	3.07	57

==== Other pitchers ====
Note: G = Games pitched; IP = Innings pitched; W = Wins; L = Losses; ERA = Earned run average; SO = Strikeouts

Player	G	IP	W	L	ERA	SO
Johnny Gorsica	34	162.0	6	14	4.11	47
Joe Orrell	10	22.1	2	1	2.42	10
Roy Henshaw	7	12.1	0	0	8.76	10

==== Relief pitchers ====
Note: G = Games pitched; W = Wins; L = Losses; SV = Saves; ERA = Earned run average; SO = Strikeouts

Player	G	W	L	SV	ERA	SO
Boom-Boom Beck	28	1	2	1	3.89	25
Jake Mooty	15	0	0	0	4.45	7
Bob Gillespie	7	0	1	0	6.55	4
Zeb Eaton	6	0	0	0	5.74	4
Elon Hogsett	3	0	0	0	0.00	5

== Awards and honors ==
1944 MLB All-Star Game

- Pinky Higgins
- Hal Newhouser
- Dizzy Trout
- Rudy York

== Farm system ==
Level	Team	League	Manager
AA	Buffalo Bisons	International League	Bucky Harris
B	Hagerstown Owls	Interstate League	Herb Brett
D	Jamestown Falcons	PONY League	Ollie Carnegie

LEAGUE CHAMPIONS: Jamestown
