= 1945 Detroit Tigers season =

Major League Baseball season

1945 Detroit Tigers
- World Series Champion; American League Champion
- League: American League
- Ballpark: Briggs Stadium
- City: Detroit, Michigan
- Record: 88–65 (.575)
- League place: 1st
- Owners: Walter Briggs, Sr.
- General managers: Jack Zeller
- Managers: Steve O'Neill
- Radio: WJLB (Harry Heilmann, Don Wattrick)

The 1945 Detroit Tigers was the team's 45th season since they entered the American League in 1901. The team won the American League pennant on the final day of the season for their fourth pennant in the last eleven years and first since 1940. They then went on to win the 1945 World Series, defeating the Chicago Cubs in seven games. It was the second World Series championship for the Tigers and first in ten years.

Detroit pitcher Hal Newhouser was named the American League's Most Valuable Player (MVP). for the 2nd consecutive season.

== Offseason ==
- March 5, 1945: Spring training opens. Due to wartime travel restrictions, the Tigers and six other teams hold spring training in Indiana.

== Regular season ==
=== The players ===
==== Catchers: Swift and Richards ====
The catching duties were split between Bob Swift (94 games) and Paul Richards (83 games). Swift hit .233, and Richards .256. Richards got the nod as the starting catcher in the World Series. Swift took over as the Tigers' manager in 1965 after Chuck Dressen was felled by two heart attacks. Later that year, Swift was diagnosed with lung cancer and died in October at age 51. Richards went on to be a manager for the White Sox (1951–54), Orioles (1955–61), and Braves (1966–72).

==== Infield: York, Mayo, Maier, and Webb ====
First baseman Rudy York was among the American League leaders in home runs for 11 consecutive seasons from 1937 to 1947, and his .503 slugging percentage as a Tiger ranks #4 in franchise history. In 1945, York hit .264 with 18 home runs and 87 RBIs. York had a poor World Series in 1945, playing in all seven games, but batting only .179 with no home runs.

Prior to 1944, second baseman Eddie Mayo had never hit for a batting average higher than .227. Yet in 1945, Mayo hit for a .285 average and .347 on base percentage with 24 doubles and a career-high 10 home runs. Mayo also won his second Gold Glove award in 1945 and led all American League second basemen with a .980 fielding percentage. Selected for the American League All-Star team, he had the highest batting average among Tigers players with at least 300 at bats. Hal Newhouser credited Mayo for sparking the Tigers' 1945 pennant drive, calling him the "take-charge guy in our infield." Mayo finished second to Newhouser in the AL MVP voting. Newhouser had 9 first place votes, and Mayo had 7.

Traded to the Tigers after the 1944 season, shortstop Skeeter Webb proved to be a liability at bat, as he hit only .199. Though he was a fine fielder, many believed he held onto the starting shortstop job despite his weak hitting because he was married to the daughter of Tigers' manager Steve O'Neill. In Game 7 of the World Series, Skeeter had his best performance, scoring two runs and fielding the final out of the Series.

Third baseman Bob Maier played only one season in the big leagues, but he spent that season on a championship team. Maier played in 132 games for the 1945 Tigers, batting .263 with 58 runs, 34 RBIs, 25 doubles, 7 triples, and 7 stolen bases. Though he was the starting third baseman during the regular season, the starting job went to Jimmy Outlaw in the World Series, as Outlaw moved from the outfield to third base to make room for Hank Greenberg who had returned from military service in July. Maier had a pinch-hit single Game 6 of the 1945 World Series, which turned to be his last major league at bat.

==== Outfield: Cullenbine, Cramer, Outlaw, and Greenberg ====
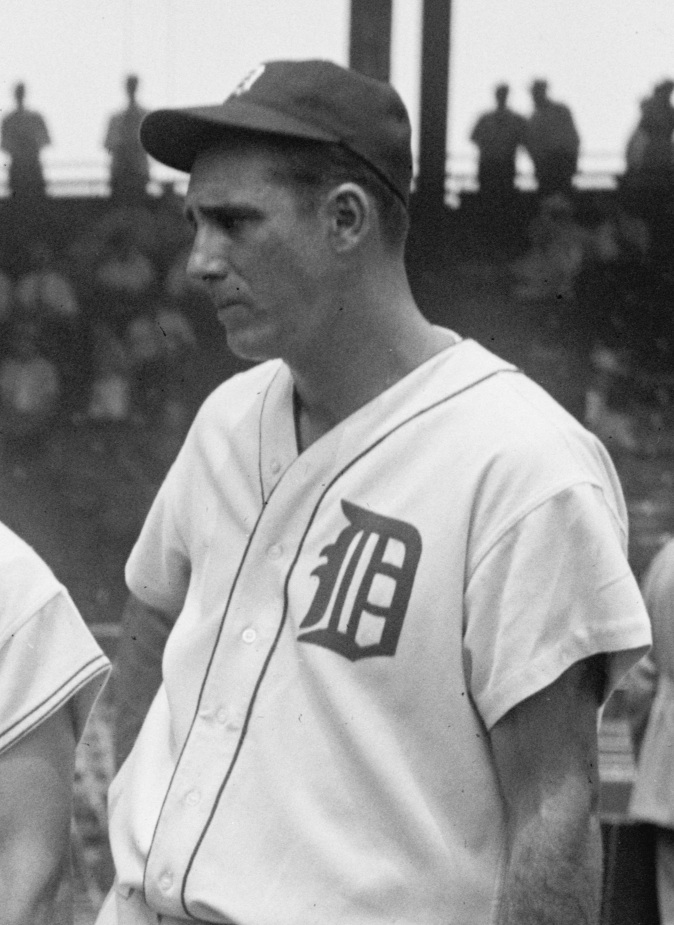
Hank Greenberg, Hall of Famer and 2-time MVP

Jimmy Outlaw was the left fielder for the first half of the season, but he was replaced by Hank Greenberg when he returned from service in World War II in July. After Greenberg returned, Outlaw played 21 games at third base, 17 games in center field and 8 games in right field. Outlaw hit .271 in 132 games.

Greenberg had missed four seasons to military service, but rejoined the Tigers after his discharge on July 1, 1945. At age 34, Greenberg picked up where he left off, hitting a home run in his first game. Without the benefit of spring training, he returned to the Tigers, was again voted to the All-Star Team, and hit a dramatic pennant-clinching grand slam home run in the 9th inning on the last day of the regular season. He also set a major league record with 11 multi-homer games in 1945.

Center fielder Doc Cramer, nicknamed "Flit", was a veteran player who had been playing in the major leagues since 1929. He ended his career with 2,705 hits. In 1945, at age 40, he was the oldest player on an old team. He hit .275 with 58 RBIs in the regular season and led the team with a .379 batting average in the 1945 World Series, scoring seven runs and batting in four.

Shortly before the 1945 season started, right fielder Roy Cullenbine was traded by the Indians to the Tigers. Cullenbine was raised in Detroit and started his career as a Tiger but was declared a free agent by Judge Landis in 1940. In 1945, Cullenbine led the American League with 113 walks and was 2nd in the AL with a .402 on-base percentage. He also hit for power in 1945, with 18 home runs (tied with Rudy York for 2nd in the AL), 93 RBIs (2nd in the AL), 51 extra base hits (4th in the AL), and a .444 slugging percentage (3rd in the AL). Despite batting only .227 in the Series, Cullenbine walked 8 times for a .433 on-base percentage and scored five runs.

==== Pitching: Newhouser, Trout, Benton, Overmire and Trucks ====
The starting pitchers were Hal Newhouser, Dizzy Trout, Al Benton, Stubby Overmire, and Les Mueller.

Hal Newhouser, also known as "Prince Hal", won 25 games and was named the American League's Most Valuable Player for the second consecutive season. He was the first pitcher in the history of the American League to win the MVP for two consecutive seasons. Newhouser won the pitching triple crown, leading the American League in wins (25, against nine losses), ERA (1.81) and strikeouts (212). He also led the league in innings pitched (313 1/3), games started (36), complete games (29), and shutouts (8). Newhouser also won two games in the World Series, including the deciding seventh game. Newhouser and Greenberg were the only two players from the 1945 Tigers who were elected to the Baseball Hall of Fame.

Al Benton missed the 1943 and 1944 seasons while serving in the U.S. Navy during World War II. He was discharged from the Navy in November 1944 and had his best year in 1945. He compiled a record of 13–8, a career-low 2.02 ERA, five shutouts, and 12 complete games in 191.2 innings. In a remarkable testament to the Tigers' pitching in 1945, Newhouser and Benton were No. 1 and No. 2 in ERA among AL pitchers. Newhouser's Adjusted ERA+ in 1945 was 195 and Benton's was 175. The Adjusted ERA+ figures posted by Newhouser and Benton in 1945 rank as the 1st and 5th best seasons all time for a Detroit Tigers pitcher with at least 150 innings pitched. (See Detroit Tigers team records)

After winning 20 games in 1943 and 27 games in 1944, Dizzy Trout won 18 games in 1945 and was a workhorse in the pennant drive. He pitched six games and won four over a nine-game late-season stretch. In Game 4 of the 1945 World Series, Trout beat the Cubs 4–1 on a five-hitter. Trout went 1–1 in the Series with an ERA of 0.66.

The Tigers #4 starter in 1945 was Stubby Overmire. He won 9 games and started Game 3 of the 1945 World Series against the Chicago Cubs. Despite giving up only 2 runs in 6 innings, Overmire took the loss as the Tigers were shut out 3–0.

After service in the Navy, Virgil Trucks returned to the Tigers on the last day of the regular season. He got the start in the final game (allowing 1 run in 5 1/3 innings), in which the Tigers clinched the pennant. To help returning veterans, the Commissioner waived the rule requiring a player to be on the roster on September 1 to be eligible for World Series play. Trucks was the winning pitcher in Game 2 of the World Series.

Though he had a record of 6–8, pitcher Les Mueller appeared in 26 games and played an important role in the 1945 Tigers season. After missing the 1942–1944 seasons to military service, Mueller gave up a single to Pete Gray, the St. Louis Browns' famous one-armed outfielder, in Gray's first major league game in April 1945. Three months later, on July 21, 1945, Mueller pitched the first 19 2/3 innings for the Tigers and left having given up only 1 run. No pitcher has thrown as many innings in a major league game since Mueller's feat. The game lasted 4 hours and 48 minutes before the game was called due to darkness. Mueller also pitched 2 scoreless innings in Game 1 of the 1945 World Series.

Relief pitching was split between George Caster (who was selected off waivers from the St. Louis Browns on August 8, 1945), Walter Wilson, Zeb Eaton, and Art Houtteman.

== Season standings ==
American League
Team	W	L	Pct.	GB	Home	Road
Detroit Tigers	88	65	.575	—	50‍–‍26	38‍–‍39
Washington Senators	87	67	.565	1½	46‍–‍31	41‍–‍36
St. Louis Browns	81	70	.536	6	47‍–‍27	34‍–‍43
New York Yankees	81	71	.533	6½	48‍–‍28	33‍–‍43
Cleveland Indians	73	72	.503	11	44‍–‍33	29‍–‍39
Chicago White Sox	71	78	.477	15	44‍–‍29	27‍–‍49
Boston Red Sox	71	83	.461	17½	42‍–‍35	29‍–‍48
Philadelphia Athletics	52	98	.347	34½	39‍–‍35	13‍–‍63

=== Record vs. opponents ===
1945 American League record Sources:
Team	BOS	CWS	CLE	DET	NYY	PHA	SLB	WSH
Boston	—	9–13	11–11	12–10–1	6–16	14–8	8–14–1	11–11–1
Chicago	13–9	—	11–8–1	10–12	9–12	12–10	8–13	8–14
Cleveland	11–11	8–11–1	—	11–11	12–9	12–6–1	11–10	8–14
Detroit	10–12–1	12–10	11–11	—	15–7	15–7–1	15–6	10–12
New York	16–6	12–9	9–12	7–15	—	16–6	7–15	14–8
Philadelphia	8–14	10–12	6–12–1	7–15–1	6–16	—	10–12–1	5–17
St. Louis	14–8–1	13–8	10–11	6–15	15–7	12–10–1	—	11–11–1
Washington	11–11–1	14–8	14–8	12–10	8–14	17–5	11–11–1	—

== Roster ==
1945 Detroit Tigers
Roster
Pitchers: 19 Al Benton; 10 Tommy Bridges; 25 George Caster; 17 Zeb Eaton; 21 Art Houtteman; 20 Pat McLaughlin; 15 Les Mueller; 16 Hal Newhouser; 36 Prince Oana; 14 Joe Orrell; 18 Stubby Overmire; 5,20 Billy Pierce; 14 Jim Tobin; 11 Dizzy Trout; 22 Virgil Trucks; 24 Walter Wilson	Catchers: 23 Hack Miller; 9 Paul Richards; 1 Bob Swift; 23 Milt Welch; Infielders: 10,30 Red Borom; 7 Joe Hoover; 22 Bob Maier; 3 Eddie Mayo; 12,25 John McHale; 2 Don Ross; 28 Skeeter Webb; 4 Rudy York	Outfielders: 8 Doc Cramer; 6 Roy Cullenbine; 5 Hank Greenberg; 26 Chuck Hostetler; 2 Ed Mierkowicz; 27 Jimmy Outlaw; 34 Hub Walker; Other batters: 29 Russ Kerns; 29 Carl McNabb	Manager: 32 Steve O'Neill; Coaches: 31 Art Mills

== Season summary ==
=== Season highlights ===
- April 17, 1945: The Tigers lost to the St. Louis Browns, 7–1 on Opening Day. In his first major league game, one-armed outfielder Pete Gray hit a single off Detroit pitcher Les Mueller. Gray handled no chances in the outfield.
- April 29, 1945: Between games of a doubleheader‚ the Tigers acquired Roy Cullenbine in a trade with the Indians.
- May 1, 1945: Light-hitting Skeeter Webb was the only Tiger to reach base with a single in the third inning, as the White Sox pitcher Joe Haynes missed a perfect game. The Tigers lost, 5–0.
- May 6, 1945: Hal Newhouser and Al Benton shut out the Browns in a double-header. Newhouser won the opener, 3–0, while Benton took the second game, 1–0. Roy Cullenbine hit a 9th-inning home run to win the second game.
- May 9, 1945: The Tigers defeated the Yankees, 4–1, behind the pitching of Dizzy Trout.
- May 13, 1945: The Tigers split a double-header with the Boston Red Sox. The Tigers won the second game, 2–0, in an Al Benton shutout. Benton had allowed one earned run in his last 45 innings.
- May 18, 1945: The Tigers were rained out for the 4th straight day.
- May 24, 1945: After starting the season with 5 wins and 3 shutouts‚ Al Benton was injured in the 4th inning after being hit in the ankle by a line drive. The A's beat the Tigers, 7–2.
- June 29, 1945: The Tigers lost to the Washington Senators, 8–3, after Detroit pitcher Stubby Overmire gave up 5 runs in the 1st inning. The Tigers led the Yankees by a half-game.
- July 1, 1945: Hank Greenberg played his first game after returning from four years of military service, hitting a home run in front of 47,700 fans at Briggs Stadium. Rudy York also hit a three-run home run, as the Tigers won the first game of a double-header against the A's‚ 9–5. The Tigers also won the second game, 5–3‚ to increase their lead over the Yankees to 3 1/2 games.
- July 9, 1945: In lieu of the All-Star game, which had been cancelled due to wartime travel restrictions, the major leagues scheduled interleague exhibition games. The Tigers were to play at Pittsburgh, although the game was cancelled when the Office of Defense Transportation refused to grant the Tigers permission to detour 62 miles to get to Pittsburgh.
- July 15, 1945: Detroit manager Steve O'Neill sent in pitcher Zeb Eaton to hit with the bases loaded in the 4th against the Yankees' Hank Borowy. Eaton hit a grand slam‚ but the Yankees won, 5–4, when Detroit rookie Walter Wilson walked a batter with the bases loaded in the 6th inning.
- July 21, 1945: The Tigers and A's play 24 innings in a game which was called due to darkness with the score tied 1–1. Les Mueller pitched 19 2/3 innings‚ allowing only one run. In the 10th inning, Jimmy Outlaw threw a runner out at home to preserve the tie. The game lasted an AL-record 4 hours and 48 minutes. Umpire Bill Summers called the game at 7:48 p.m., saying: "I'm sorry, I just can't see the ball anymore." A's third baseman George Kell had the worst game of his career, going 0-for-10.
- July 27, 1945: The Tigers beat the White Sox, 1–0, behind the shutout pitching of Hal Newhouser. Eddie Mayo hit a walk-off home run in the bottom of the 9th inning to win it for Detroit.
- August 6, 1945: The Tigers split a double-header with the White Sox. Al Benton won the opener 6–2, but the Tigers were shut out by Johnny Humphries in the second game, 7–0.
- August 8, 1945: The Tigers split a double-header with the Red Sox‚ winning the opener, 5–2, losing the second game, 7–4. In the 10th inning of game 2, Hank Greenberg hit a line drive which hit Boston pitcher Jim Wilson in the head. Wilson underwent surgery then did not pitch in another major league game for 11 years.
- August 12, 1945: The Tigers swept the Yankees in a double-header. Newly acquired pitcher Jim Tobin hit a 3-run walk-off home run in the bottom of the 11th inning to win the opener, 9–6. Hal Newhouser got his 18th win in the second game, 8–2.
- August 15, 1945: The Tigers lost to the Washington Senators, 8–0, behind the pitching of Dutch Leonard.
- August 20, 1945: Hal Newhouser won his 20th game with a 4–0 shutout against the A's. Roy Cullenbine and Doc Cramer both hit home runs for the Tigers.
- August 24, 1945: Pitching stars Hal Newhouser and Bob Feller faced off in Cleveland. A sellout crowd of 46‚477 paid to see Feller's first game since being discharged from the Navy. The Tigers lost, 4–2, as Feller struck out 12 batters.
- August 25, 1945: The Tigers beat the Browns, 1–0. The only run came in the 3rd inning when Joe Hoover stole home as part of a double steal.
- September 1, 1945: Pitching stars Hal Newhouser and Bob Feller faced off for the second time in two weeks. This time, the Tigers won 5–4, however Newhouser injured his back in the 7th inning and was out of action for six days. The Tigers were 1 1/2 games ahead of the 2nd place Washington Senators.
- September 4, 1945: The Tigers crushed the Yankees, 10–0, as Dizzy Trout pitched a shutout. With their pitching depleted, the Yankees' batting practice pitcher Paul Schreiber got the start at age 43. Schreiber's last previous major league pitching appearance had been in 1923.
- September 7, 1945: Hal Newhouser got his first start after injuring his back on September 1. The Tigers beat the Yankees, 5–0, as Newhouser held the Yankees to 4 singles.
- September 15, 1945: With the Senators trailing the Tigers by a half game, the top two teams faced each other in a 5-game series. The Tigers swept a double-header over the Senators to extend their lead to 2 1/2 games.
- September 16, 1945: The Tigers and Senators split a double-header—the second in a row between the teams. The Senators beat Hal Newhouser, 3–2, in game 1, while the Tigers took the second game, 5–4.
- September 18, 1945: The Tigers lost to the Senators, as the Bengals' lead shrank to 1 1/2 games. Dizzy Trout, pitching for the 6th time in 10 days‚ gave up four runs in the first inning. Playing on a muddy field, the Tigers and Senators tied the MLB record at the time by using 35 players in the game.
- September 19, 1945: The Tigers were shut out by Bob Feller, 2–0. Jimmy Outlaw had the only hit off Feller, a bloop single in the 5th inning. The Senators did not play, and the Tigers' lead is then only 1 game.
- September 20, 1945: The Tigers lost to the Indians 6–1, as the Tigers committed 4 errors. The Yankees beat the Senators, and the Tigers' lead remained at 1 game.
- September 22, 1945: The Tigers beat the St. Louis Browns, 9–0, as Hal Newhouser recorded another shutout.
- September 23, 1945: The Tigers lost, 5–0, to the Browns. The Senators lost to the A's, as third baseman George Kell drove in the winning run for the A's.
- September 26, 1945: The Tigers won the first game of a double-header against Cleveland, 11–0, behind the pitching of Hal Newhouser. They had a chance to clinch the pennant in the second game, but lost 3–2. The Tigers finished the day one game ahead of the Senators.
- September 29, 1945: The Tigers could have won the pennant with a victory over the Browns, however the game was rained out.
- September 30, 1945: The last day of the regular season, and the Tigers had to beat the Browns to avoid a one-game playoff with the Senators. The Tigers started Virgil Trucks, who had not played all year and had been released from the military only three days earlier. Hal Newhouser relieved Trucks in the 5th inning, and allowed a run in the bottom of the 8th inning to put the Browns on top 3–2. Hank Greenberg came to bat with the bases loaded in the top of the 9th inning, and hit a grand slam home run. Al Benton pitched the bottom of the 9th to hold the lead, and the Tigers won the pennant.
- October 10, 1945: The Tigers won Game 7 of the World Series in Wrigley Field to win the team's second World Series championship. Only Hank Greenberg and Tommy Bridges remained from the 1935 championship team.
- November 8, 1945: The American League Most Valuable Player award went to Hal Newhouser for the second straight year. Tigers second baseman Eddie Mayo finished second in the MVP voting.

== Player stats ==
= Indicates team leader

=== Batting ===
==== Starters by position ====
Note: Pos = Position; G = Games played; AB = At bats; H = Hits; Avg. = Batting average; HR = Home runs; RBI = Runs batted in

Pos	Player	G	AB	H	Avg.	HR	RBI
C	Bob Swift	95	279	65	.233	0	24
1B	Rudy York	155	595	157	.264	18	87
2B	Eddie Mayo	134	501	143	.285	10	54
3B	Bob Maier	132	486	128	.263	1	34
SS	Skeeter Webb	118	407	81	.199	0	21
OF	Roy Cullenbine	146	523	145	.277	18	93
OF	Doc Cramer	141	541	149	.275	6	58
OF	Jimmy Outlaw	132	446	121	.271	0	34

==== Other batters ====
Note: G = Games played; AB = At bats; H = Hits; Avg. = Batting average; HR = Home runs; RBI = Runs batted in

Player	G	AB	H	Avg.	HR	RBI
Hank Greenberg	78	270	84	.311	13	60
Paul Richards	83	234	60	.256	3	32
Joe Hoover	74	222	57	.257	1	17
Red Borom	55	130	35	.269	0	9
Chuck Hostetler	42	44	7	.159	0	2
Don Ross	8	29	11	.379	0	4
Hub Walker	28	23	3	.130	0	1
Ed Mierkowicz	10	15	2	.133	0	2
John McHale	19	14	2	.143	0	1
Hack Miller	2	4	3	.750	0	1
Milt Welch	2	2	0	.000	0	0
Carl McNabb	1	1	0	.000	0	0
Russ Kerns	1	1	0	.000	0	0

Note: pitchers' batting statistics not included

=== Pitching ===
= Indicates league leader

==== Starting pitchers ====
Note: G = Games pitched; IP = Innings pitched; W = Wins; L = Losses; ERA = Earned run average; SO = Strikeouts

Player	G	IP	W	L	ERA	SO
Hal Newhouser	40	313.1	25	9	1.81	212
Dizzy Trout	41	246.1	18	15	3.14	97
Al Benton	31	191.2	13	8	2.02	76
Stubby Overmire	31	162.1	9	9	3.88	36
Les Mueller	26	134.2	6	8	3.68	42
Virgil Trucks	1	5.1	0	0	1.69	32

==== Other pitchers ====
Note: G = Games pitched; IP = Innings pitched; W = Wins; L = Losses; ERA = Earned run average; SO = Strikeouts

Player	G	IP	W	L	ERA	SO
Jim Tobin	14	58.1	4	5	3.55	14
Joe Orrell	12	48.0	2	3	3.00	14
Prince Oana	3	11.1	0	0	1.59	3
Tommy Bridges	4	11.0	1	0	3.27	6

==== Relief pitchers ====
Note: G = Games pitched; W= Wins; L= Losses; SV = Saves; GF = Games finished; ERA = Earned run average; SO = Strikeouts

Player	G	W	L	SV	GF	ERA	SO
George Caster	22	5	1	2	10	3.86	23
Walter Wilson	25	1	3	0	9	4.61	28
Zeb Eaton	17	0	2	0	9	4.05	15
Art Houtteman	13	0	2	0	9	5.33	9
Billy Pierce	5	0	0	0	4	1.80	10
Pat McLaughlin	1	0	0	0	1	9.00	0

== 1945 World Series ==
=== World Series summary ===
The 1945 World Series featured the Tigers and the Chicago Cubs, with the Tigers winning in seven games for their second championship in six World Series appearances. To minimize travel due to wartime restrictions, the first three games were played at Briggs Stadium in Detroit, and the remaining four games at Wrigley Field in Chicago.

Because of the depleted talent pool resulting from many players being in the military, the Tigers and the Cubs both fielded teams which would have been considered mediocre before or after the war. Warren Brown, author of a 1946 history of the Cubs, commented on this by titling his chapter on the 1945 World Series, "World's Worst Series". Sportswriter Frank Graham jokingly called this Series "the fat men versus the tall men at the office picnic."

In Game 1, Detroit ace Hal Newhouser gave up four runs in the first inning and three more in the third. Pitching for the Cubs in his first of four games in the 1945 Series, Hank Borowy threw a six-hit shutout to defeat the Tigers, 9–0.

In Game 2, Virgil Trucks got the start less than a week after his discharge from the U.S. Navy. Trucks held the Cubs to 1 run, and Hank Greenberg hit a three-run home run in the fifth inning. The Tigers won, 4–1, to even the Series.

In Game 3, the Tigers were shut out by Cubs pitcher Claude Passeau. Passeau allowed only one hit—a single by Rudy York. The Tigers lost, 3–0.

In Game 4, Dizzy Trout helped even the Series, allowing only 5 hits and 1 run. The Tigers won, 4–1.

In Game 5, Hal Newhouser faced Hank Borowy. Newhouser struck out 9 Cubs, and Hank Greenberg hit three doubles off Borowy. The Tigers won 8–4.

In Game 6, Hank Greenberg hit a home run in the eighth inning to tie the score, although the Cubs won, 8–7, in extra innings. The game ended in the 12th inning with a line drive by Stan Hack which took a bad hop past Greenberg in left field. Initially, Greenberg was charged with an error, but the call was reversed the next morning, and Hack was credited with a double. Game 6 is also remembered for Chuck Hostetler's baserunning blunder. The 42-year-old Hostetler had debuted the previous year as the oldest rookie in MLB history. He reached base in Game 6 on an error to start the 6th inning. He advanced to second with one out, and when Doc Cramer hit a single to left field, Hostetler ran through manager Steve O'Neill's stop sign at third base. He tried to put on his brakes half way home, lost his footing, fell to the ground, and was tagged out while scrambling around on all fours. The Tigers could have avoided extra innings and won the Series in Game 6 if Hostetler had held up, as he would have scored in the following rally. Hostetler did not appear in another major league game. Fifty years later, baseball writer Joe Falls recalled Hostetler's blunder in a column in the Detroit News, writing: "If anyone symbolized the futility of wartime baseball —both in Detroit and America — it was outfielder Chuck Hostetler of the Tigers, the man who fell on his face in the 1945 World Series."

In Game 7, Cubs' manager Charlie Grimm gave the start to Hank Borowy despite his having pitched in Games 1, 5, and 6. The Tigers scored five runs off Borowy in the 1st inning, while Hal Newhouser struck out 10 and held the Cubs to three runs. Doc Cramer went 3-for-5, and Paul Richards hit a bases-loaded double in the first inning to clear the bases and give Newhouser a lead. In all, Richards had two doubles and four RBIs to lead the Tigers in Game 7. The Tigers won the game, 9–3.

The day after the Tigers' Game 7 victory, H. G. Salsinger wrote in the Detroit News that pitching was the key to the Tigers' success: "Detroit beat the Cubs with TNT, meaning Trucks, Newhouser, and Trout, and they beat them twice with 'N.'"

A little known fact about the 1945 World Series is teenage boys worked the games as ushers in the stands. With most able bodied men away at war, young teenage boys were allowed to work as ushers. The boys would line up at the gate outside Briggs Stadium before the game and would be selected in a fashion similar to how migrant workers are selected to work today. The boys would volunteer their services, but would receive tips.

Game	Score	Date	Location	Attendance	Winning Pitcher	Losing Pitcher
1	Cubs – 9, Tigers – 0	October 3	Briggs Stadium	54,637	Hank Borowy	Hal Newhouser
2	Cubs – 1, Tigers – 4	October 4	Briggs Stadium	53,636	Virgil Trucks	Hank Wyse
3	Cubs – 3, Tigers – 0	October 5	Briggs Stadium	55,500	Claude Passeau	Stubby Overmire
4	Tigers – 4, Cubs – 1	October 6	Wrigley Field	42,923	Dizzy Trout	Ray Prim
5	Tigers – 8, Cubs – 4	October 7	Wrigley Field	43,463	Hal Newhouser	Hank Borowy
6	Tigers – 7, Cubs – 8	October 8	Wrigley Field	41,708	Hank Borowy	Dizzy Trout
7	Tigers – 9, Cubs – 3	October 10	Wrigley Field	41,590	Hal Newhouser	Hank Borowy

=== Postseason player stats ===
==== Batting ====
Note: G = Games played; AB = At bats; H = Hits; Avg. = Batting average; HR = Home runs; RBI = Runs batted in

Player	G	AB	H	Avg.	HR	RBI
Doc Cramer	7	29	11	.379	0	4
Roy Cullenbine	7	22	5	.227	0	4
Hank Greenberg	7	23	7	.304	2	7
Joe Hoover	1	3	1	.333	0	1
Chuck Hostetler	3	3	0	.000	0	0
Eddie Mayo	7	28	7	.250	0	2
John McHale	3	3	0	.000	0	0
Jimmy Outlaw	7	28	5	.179	0	3
Paul Richards	7	19	4	.211	0	6
Bob Swift	3	4	1	.250	0	0
Hub Walker	2	2	1	.500	0	0
Skeeter Webb	7	27	5	.185	0	1
Rudy York	7	28	5	.179	0	3

==== Pitching ====
Note: G = Games pitched; IP = Innings pitched; W = Wins; L = Losses; ERA = Earned run average; SO = Strikeouts

Player	G	IP	W	L	ERA	SO
Hal Newhouser	3	20.2	2	1	6.10	22
Dizzy Trout	2	13.2	1	1	0.66	9
Virgil Trucks	2	13.1	1	0	3.38	7
Stubby Overmire	1	6.0	0	1	3.00	2
Al Benton	3	4.2	0	0	1.93	5
Jim Tobin	1	3.0	0	0	6.00	0
Les Mueller	1	2.0	0	0	0.00	1
Tommy Bridges	1	1.2	0	0	16.20	1
George Caster	1	0.2	0	0	0.00	1

== Awards and honors ==
- Hal Newhouser: AL Most Valuable Player Award

=== League leaders ===
- Doc Cramer: AL fielding percentage leader in outfield (.991)
- Roy Cullenbine: AL walks leader (113)
- Art Houtteman: Youngest player in AL (17)
- Eddie Mayo: The Sporting News Most Valuable Player Award
- Eddie Mayo: AL fielding percentage leader at second base (.980)
- Hal Newhouser: AL pitching triple crown winner
- Hal Newhouser: AL wins leader (25)
- Hal Newhouser: AL ERA leader (1.81)
- Hal Newhouser: AL strikeouts leader (212)
- Hal Newhouser: AL complete games leader (29)
- Hal Newhouser: AL shutouts leader (8)
- Hal Newhouser: AL games started leader (36)
- Hal Newhouser: AL innings pitched leader (313 1/3)
- Hal Newhouser: AL strikeouts per 9 innings pitched leader (6.09)
- Hal Newhouser: AL batters faced leader (1261)
- Hal Newhouser: AL fielding percentage leader at pitcher (1.000)
- Dizzy Trout: AL leader in errors at pitcher (9)
- Rudy York: AL grounded into double play leader (23)
- Rudy York: AL leader in putouts at first base (1464)
- Rudy York: AL leader in errors at first base (19)

=== Players ranking among top 100 of all time at position ===
The following members of the 1945 Detroit Tigers are among the Top 100 of all time at their position, as ranked by The New Bill James Historical Baseball Abstract in 2001:

- Hank Greenberg: 8th best first baseman of all time
- Rudy York: 56th best first baseman of all time
- Doc Cramer: 91st best center fielder of all time
- Roy Cullenbine: 68th best right fielder of all time
- Hal Newhouser: 36th best pitcher of all time
- Virgil Trucks: 61st best pitcher of all time

== Farm system ==
Level	Team	League	Manager
AA	Buffalo Bisons	International League	Bucky Harris
D	Jamestown Falcons	PONY League	Jim Levey
