= 1947 Detroit Tigers season =

Major League Baseball season

1947 Detroit Tigers
- League: American League
- Ballpark: Briggs Stadium
- City: Detroit
- Record: 85–69 (.552)
- League place: 2nd
- Owners: Walter Briggs, Sr.
- General managers: Billy Evans
- Managers: Steve O'Neill
- Television: WWDT (Harry Heilmann, Paul Williams, Ty Tyson)
- Radio: WJLB (Harry Heilmann, Hal Prough)

The 1947 Detroit Tigers season was a season in American baseball. The team finished second in the American League with a record of 85–69, 12 games behind the New York Yankees.

== Offseason ==
- December 12, 1946: George Caster was released by the Tigers.

== Regular season ==
=== Season standings ===
American League
Team	W	L	Pct.	GB	Home	Road
New York Yankees	97	57	.630	—	55‍–‍22	42‍–‍35
Detroit Tigers	85	69	.552	12	46‍–‍31	39‍–‍38
Boston Red Sox	83	71	.539	14	49‍–‍30	34‍–‍41
Cleveland Indians	80	74	.519	17	38‍–‍39	42‍–‍35
Philadelphia Athletics	78	76	.506	19	39‍–‍38	39‍–‍38
Chicago White Sox	70	84	.455	27	32‍–‍43	38‍–‍41
Washington Senators	64	90	.416	33	36‍–‍41	28‍–‍49
St. Louis Browns	59	95	.383	38	29‍–‍48	30‍–‍47

=== Record vs. opponents ===
1947 American League record Sources:
Team	BOS	CWS	CLE	DET	NYY	PHA	SLB	WSH
Boston	—	16–6–1	9–13	12–10–1	9–13	10–12–1	15–7	12–10
Chicago	6–16–1	—	11–11	7–15	10–12	11–11	11–11	14–8
Cleveland	13–9	11–11	—	8–14–2	7–15	11–11–1	17–5	13–9
Detroit	10–12–1	15–7	14–8–2	—	8–14–1	11–11	15–7	12–10
New York	13–9	12–10	15–7	14–8–1	—	13–9	15–7	15–7
Philadelphia	12–10–1	11–11	11–11–1	11–11	9–13	—	13–9	11–11
St. Louis	7–15	11–11	5–17	7–15	7–15	9–13	—	13–9
Washington	10–12	8–14	9–13	10–12	7–15	11–11	9–13	—

=== Roster ===
1947 Detroit Tigers
Roster
Pitchers: 19 Al Benton; 34 Rufe Gentry; 24 Johnny Gorsica; 15,21 Art Houtteman; 29 Fred Hutchinson; 16 Hal Newhouser; 18 Stubby Overmire; 11 Dizzy Trout; 22 Virgil Trucks; 17 Hal White	Catchers: 25 Hank Riebe; 9 Bob Swift; 1 Birdie Tebbetts; 1 Hal Wagner; Infielders: 2 Roy Cullenbine; 15,21 George Kell; 7 Eddie Lake; 3 Eddie Mayo; 23 John McHale; 28 Skeeter Webb	Outfielders: 8 Doc Cramer; 14 Hoot Evers; 10 Johnny Groth; 12 Ed Mierkowicz; 6 Pat Mullin; 27 Jimmy Outlaw; 4 Dick Wakefield; 20 Vic Wertz; Other batters: 26 Ben Steiner	Manager: 32 Steve O'Neill; Coaches: 31 Art Mills; 30 Frank Shellenback; 33 Bill Sweeney

== Player stats ==
=== Batting ===
==== Starters by position ====
Note: Pos = Position; G = Games played; AB = At bats; H = Hits; Avg. = Batting average; HR = Home runs; RBI = Runs batted in

Pos	Player	G	AB	H	Avg.	HR	RBI
C	Bob Swift	97	279	70	.251	1	21
1B	Roy Cullenbine	142	464	104	.224	24	78
2B	Eddie Mayo	142	535	149	.279	6	48
SS	Eddie Lake	158	602	127	.211	12	46
3B	George Kell	152	588	188	.320	5	93
OF	Dick Wakefield	112	368	104	.283	8	51
OF	Hoot Evers	126	460	136	.296	10	67
OF	Pat Mullin	116	398	102	.256	15	62

==== Other batters ====
Note: G = Games played; AB = At bats; H = Hits; Avg. = Batting average; HR = Home runs; RBI = Runs batted in

Player	G	AB	H	Avg.	HR	RBI
Vic Wertz	102	333	96	.288	6	44
Hal Wagner	71	191	55	.288	5	33
Doc Cramer	73	157	42	.268	2	30
Jimmy Outlaw	70	127	29	.228	0	15
John McHale	39	95	20	.211	3	11
Skeeter Webb	50	79	16	.203	0	6
Birdie Tebbetts	20	53	5	.094	0	2
Ed Mierkowicz	21	42	8	.190	1	1
Hank Riebe	8	7	0	.000	0	2
Johnny Groth	2	4	1	.250	0	0
Ben Steiner	1	0	0	----	0	0

=== Pitching ===
==== Starting pitchers ====
Note: G = Games pitched; IP = Innings pitched; W = Wins; L = Losses; ERA = Earned run average; SO = Strikeouts

Player	G	IP	W	L	ERA	SO
Hal Newhouser	40	285.0	17	17	2.87	176
Fred Hutchinson	33	219.2	18	10	3.03	113
Dizzy Trout	32	186.1	10	11	3.48	74
Virgil Trucks	36	180.2	10	12	4.53	108
Stubby Overmire	28	140.2	11	5	3.77	33

==== Other pitchers ====
Note: G = Games pitched; IP = Innings pitched; W = Wins; L = Losses; ERA = Earned run average; SO = Strikeouts

Player	G	IP	W	L	ERA	SO
Al Benton	36	133.0	6	7	4.40	33
Art Houtteman	23	110.2	7	2	3.42	58
Hal White	35	84.2	4	5	3.61	33

==== Relief pitchers ====
Note: G = Games pitched; W = Wins; L = Losses; SV = Saves; ERA = Earned run average; SO = Strikeouts

Player	G	W	L	SV	ERA	SO
Johnny Gorsica	31	2	0	1	3.75	20
Rufe Gentry	1	0	0	0	81.00	0

== Farm system ==
Level	Team	League	Manager
AAA	Buffalo Bisons	International League	Paul Richards
AA	Dallas Rebels	Texas League	Al Vincent
A	Williamsport Grays	Eastern League	George Detore
B	Hagerstown Owls	Interstate League	Bunny Griffiths
B	Montgomery Rebels	Southeastern League	Frank Skaff
C	Rome Colonels	Canadian–American League	Ed Boland and Adam Bengoechea
C	Lubbock Hubbers	West Texas–New Mexico League	Jackie Sullivan
D	Troy Trojans	Alabama State League	Bob Benish
D	Thomasville Tigers	Georgia–Florida League	Vince "Moon" Mullen
D	Nazareth Tigers	North Atlantic League	John Mueller
D	Jamestown Falcons	PONY League	Marv Olson

LEAGUE CHAMPIONS: Lubbock, Jamestown
