= 1946 Detroit Tigers season =

Major League Baseball season

1946 Detroit Tigers
- League: American League
- Ballpark: Briggs Stadium
- City: Detroit
- Record: 92–62 (.597)
- League place: 2nd
- Owners: Walter Briggs, Sr.
- General managers: George Trautman
- Managers: Steve O'Neill
- Radio: WXYZ (Harry Heilmann)

The 1946 Detroit Tigers finished the season with a record of 92–62, twelve games behind the Boston Red Sox. The season was their 46th since they entered the American League in 1901.

== Offseason ==
- March 26, 1946: Rip Radcliff was released by the Tigers.

== Regular season ==
The 1946 Tigers were led by first baseman Hank Greenberg who led the AL with 127 RBIs and led the major leagues with 44 home runs, and by Hal Newhouser who led the major leagues with 26 wins, a 1.94 ERA, an Adjusted ERA+ of 188, and 8.46 strikeouts per nine innings pitched.

=== Season standings ===
American League
Team	W	L	Pct.	GB	Home	Road
Boston Red Sox	104	50	.675	—	61‍–‍16	43‍–‍34
Detroit Tigers	92	62	.597	12	48‍–‍30	44‍–‍32
New York Yankees	87	67	.565	17	47‍–‍30	40‍–‍37
Washington Senators	76	78	.494	28	38‍–‍38	38‍–‍40
Chicago White Sox	74	80	.481	30	40‍–‍38	34‍–‍42
Cleveland Indians	68	86	.442	36	36‍–‍41	32‍–‍45
St. Louis Browns	66	88	.429	38	35‍–‍41	31‍–‍47
Philadelphia Athletics	49	105	.318	55	31‍–‍46	18‍–‍59

=== Record vs. opponents ===
1946 American League record Sources:
Team	BOS	CWS	CLE	DET	NYY	PHA	SLB	WSH
Boston	—	13–9	15–7	15–7–1	14–8	17–5	14–8–1	16–6
Chicago	9–13	—	13–9–1	10–12	8–14	12–10	12–10	10–12
Cleveland	7–15	9–13–1	—	5–17	10–12	15–7	15–7–1	7–15
Detroit	7–15–1	12–10	17–5	—	13–9	17–5	14–8	12–10
New York	8–14	14–8	12–10	9–13	—	16–6	14–8	14–8
Philadelphia	5–17	10–12	7–15	5–17	6–16	—	10–12	6–16–1
St. Louis	8–14–1	10–12	7–15–1	8–14	8–14	12–10	—	13–9
Washington	6–16	12–10	15–7	10–12	8–14	16–6–1	9–13	—

=== Roster ===
1946 Detroit Tigers
Roster
Pitchers: 19 Al Benton; 10 Tommy Bridges; 25 George Caster; 34 Rufe Gentry; 35 Johnny Gorsica; 34 Ted Gray; 6 Art Houtteman; 29 Fred Hutchinson; 35 Lou Kretlow; 24 Hal Manders; 16 Hal Newhouser; 18 Stubby Overmire; 11 Dizzy Trout; 22 Virgil Trucks; 17 Hal White	Catchers: 9 Paul Richards; 12 Bob Swift; 1 Birdie Tebbetts; Infielders: 26 Jimmy Bloodworth; 5 Hank Greenberg; 6 Pinky Higgins; 23 Billy Hitchcock; 21 George Kell; 7 Eddie Lake; 37 Johnny Lipon; 3 Eddie Mayo; 28 Skeeter Webb	Outfielders: 8 Doc Cramer; 2 Roy Cullenbine; 14 Hoot Evers; 24 Johnny Groth; 21 Barney McCosky; 20 Anse Moore; 33 Pat Mullin; 27 Jimmy Outlaw; 4 Dick Wakefield; Other batters: 26 Ned Harris	Manager: 32 Steve O'Neill; Coaches: 10 Tommy Bridges; 31 Art Mills; 30 Frank Shellenback

== Player stats ==
=== Batting ===
==== Starters by position ====
Note: Pos = Position; G = Games played; AB = At bats; H = Hits; Avg. = Batting average; HR = Home runs; RBI = Runs batted in

Pos	Player	G	AB	H	Avg.	HR	RBI
C	Birdie Tebbetts	87	280	68	.243	1	34
1B	Hank Greenberg	142	523	145	.277	44	127
2B	Jimmy Bloodworth	76	249	61	.245	5	36
3B	George Kell	105	434	142	.327	4	41
SS	Eddie Lake	155	587	149	.254	8	31
OF	Dick Wakefield	111	396	106	.268	12	59
OF	Roy Cullenbine	113	328	110	.335	15	56
OF	Hoot Evers	81	304	81	.266	4	33

==== Other batters ====
Note: G = Games played; AB = At bats; H = Hits; Avg. = Batting average; HR = Home runs; RBI = Runs batted in

Player	G	AB	H	Avg.	HR	RBI
Jimmy Outlaw	92	299	78	.261	2	31
Pat Mullin	93	276	68	.246	3	35
Doc Cramer	68	204	60	.294	1	26
Eddie Mayo	51	202	51	.252	0	22
Skeeter Webb	64	169	37	.219	0	17
Paul Richards	57	139	28	.201	0	11
Anse Moore	51	134	28	.209	1	8
Bob Swift	42	107	25	.234	2	10
Barney McCosky	25	91	37	.198	1	11
Pinky Higgins	18	60	13	.217	0	8
Johnny Lipon	14	20	6	.300	0	1
Johnny Groth	4	9	0	.000	0	0
Billy Hitchcock	3	3	0	.000	0	0
Ned Harris	1	1	0	.000	0	0

Note: pitchers' batting statistics not included

=== Pitching ===
==== Starting pitchers ====
Note: G = Games pitched; IP = Innings pitched; W = Wins; L = Losses; ERA = Earned run average; SO = Strikeouts

Player	G	IP	W	L	ERA	SO
Hal Newhouser	37	292.2	26	9	1.94	275
Dizzy Trout	38	276.1	17	13	2.34	151
Virgil Trucks	32	236.2	14	9	3.23	161
Fred Hutchinson	28	207.0	14	11	3.09	138
Lou Kretlow	1	9.0	1	0	3.00	4
Art Houtteman	1	8.0	0	1	9.00	2

==== Other pitchers ====
Note: G = Games pitched; IP = Innings pitched; W = Wins; L = Losses; ERA = Earned run average; SO = Strikeouts

Player	G	IP	W	L	ERA	SO
Al Benton	28	140.2	11	7	3.65	60
Stubby Overmire	24	97.1	5	7	4.62	34
Ted Gray	3	11.2	0	2	8.49	5

==== Relief pitchers ====
Note: G = Games pitched; W= Wins; L= Losses; SV = Saves; GF = Games Finished; ERA = Earned run average; SO = Strikeouts

Player	G	W	L	SV	GF	ERA	SO
George Caster	26	2	1	4	19	5.66	19
Johnny Gorsica	14	0	0	1	7	4.56	14
Hal White	11	1	1	0	1	5.60	12
Tommy Bridges	9	1	1	1	6	5.91	17
Hal Manders	2	0	0	0	1	10.50	3
Rufe Gentry	2	0	0	0	2	15.00	1

== Awards and honors ==
=== League leaders ===
- Hank Greenberg: MLB leader in home runs (44)
- Hank Greenberg: AL leader in RBIs (127)
- Hank Greenberg: MLB leader in at bats per home run (11.9)
- Art Houtteman: Youngest player in MLB (18)
- Eddie Lake: AL leader in games played (155)
- Eddie Lake: MLB leader in plate appearances (703)
- Eddie Lake: MLB leader in outs (464)
- Eddie Lake: AL leader in power/speed number (10.4)
- Hal Newhouser: MLB leader in ERA (1.94)
- Hal Newhouser: MLB leader in wins (26)
- Hal Newhouser: MLB leader in Adjusted ERA+ (188)
- Hal Newhouser: MLB leader in walks plus hits per 9 innings pitched (1.069)
- Hal Newhouser: MLB leader in hits allowed per 9 innings (6.61)
- Hal Newhouser: MLB leader in strikeouts per 9 innings (8.46)
- Virgil Trucks: MLB leader in home runs allowed (23)

=== Players ranking among top 100 of all time at position ===
The following members of the 1945 Detroit Tigers are among the Top 100 of all time at their position, as ranked by The New Bill James Historical Baseball Abstract in 2001:

- Birdie Tebbetts: 64th best catcher of all time (played 87 games at catcher for 1946 Tigers)
- Hank Greenberg: 8th best first baseman of all time
- George Kell: 30th best third baseman of all time
- Hoot Evers: 100th best left fielder of all time (played 76 games in center field for 1946 Tigers)
- Doc Cramer: 91st best center fielder of all time (played 50 games in center field in 1946 Tigers)
- Barney McCosky: 70th best center fielder of all time (played 24 games in center field for 1946 Tigers)
- Roy Cullenbine: 68th best right fielder of all time (played 69 games in right field for 1946 Tigers)
- Hal Newhouser: 36th best pitcher of all time
- Virgil Trucks: 61st best pitcher of all time
- Tommy Bridges: 77th best pitcher of all time (pitched in 9 games for 1946 Tigers)

== Farm system ==
Level	Team	League	Manager
AAA	Buffalo Bisons	International League	Gabby Hartnett
AA	Dallas Rebels	Texas League	Al Vincent
A	Williamsport Grays	Eastern League	Gerard "Nig" Lipscomb and Harry Davis
C	Rome Colonels	Canadian–American League	Woody Wheaton
C	Lubbock Hubbers	West Texas–New Mexico League	Jim Miller
C	Muskogee Reds	Western Association	Ray Baker
D	Jamestown Falcons	PONY League	Marv Olson

LEAGUE CHAMPIONS: Dallas
