= Chuck Hostetler =

American baseball player (1903–1971)

- Right fielder
- Born: September 22, 1903; McClellandtown, Pennsylvania, U.S.
- Died: February 18, 1971 (aged 67); Fort Collins, Colorado, U.S.
- Batted: Left Threw: Right

MLB debut
- April 18, 1944, for the Detroit Tigers

Last MLB appearance
- September 23, 1945, for the Detroit Tigers

MLB statistics
- Batting average: .278
- Home runs: 0
- Runs batted in: 22
- Stats at Baseball Reference

Teams
- Detroit Tigers (1944–1945)

Career highlights and awards
- World Series champion (1945)

Charles Cloyd Hostetler (September 22, 1903 – February 18, 1971) was an American Major League Baseball right fielder for the Detroit Tigers in 1944 and 1945. He is remembered as baseball's oldest rookie, making his debut in 1944 at age 40, and as the player whose baserunning error at age 42 cost the Tigers Game 6 of the 1945 World Series.

== The minor leagues ==
Born in 1903 in McClellandtown, Pennsylvania, Hostetler was living in Akron, Ohio and playing industrial league ball when he was signed by the Boston Braves in 1928; he traveled with the club but never got into a game. The following year, he played for the Akron Tyrites in the Central League in 1929, hitting .360 in 104 games. Hostetler later played for the Tulsa Oilers in the St. Louis Browns organization, and then in the Washington Senators farm system.

Eventually, Hostetler said, "I gave up the idea of playing in the majors." He noted: "When a fellow reaches 35 the thought of playing in the majors is wishful thinking." After ten years in professional baseball, the 33-year-old Hostetler left the minor leagues and took on various industrial jobs. He played four or five games a week of semi-pro baseball in Wichita, Kansas, and in Texas, when his work schedule permitted.

== Reaching the majors ==
World War II had decimated the rosters of most major league baseball teams. Players who had been passed over suddenly were in demand. The Detroit Tigers contacted Hostetler in 1943. Hostetler noted that when the Tigers contacted him, he was "a surprised rookie."

Hostetler hit .350 during spring training at Evansville, Indiana. Hostetler's hot hitting - and a leg injury to center fielder Roger Cramer - won Hostetler a spot on the Tigers' 1944 major league roster. Born in 1903, he was 40 years old when he played his first major league game, making him the oldest rookie in the history of the game.

Hostetler's debut in April 1944 drew attention from the press. He reported his age as 38 (he was actually 40). The wire services ran several articles about Hostetler's unusual achievement. One article noted: "Chuck is a rookie at 38, something unheard of even in wartime baseball." Another article noted: "A 38-year-old rookie who's been out of organized baseball for seven years is making the Detroit Tigers believe that life begins at 40 -- or 38 at least. Yet another referred to Hostetler as a player "snatched out of a factory two years ago to add depth to a garden depleted by the war."

When the regular season got underway, Hostetler took full advantage of the opportunity and was the hottest hitter in baseball that spring. As of May 3, 1944, the Associated Press reported that "the over-age recruit has 12 hits in 26 tries for a fat .462 average." On May 2, he collected three hits, including a triple, to lead the Tigers to a 4–3 win over the St. Louis Browns.

Three weeks into the season, Hostetler was still leading the league with a .444 batting average and had become the talk of the baseball world. Baseball writer Chip Royal referred to Hostetler as "a 38-year-old veteran from the sandlots with a terrific wallop at the plate."

On June 18, 1944, Hostetler went 4-for-5 in game 1 of a doubleheader against the St. Louis Browns, making him the only Tiger over the age of 40 to record a 4-hit game. That achievement was not matched for another 79 years, until Miguel Cabrera recorded 4 hits against the Chicago White Sox on September 2, 2023.

Detroit manager Steve O'Neill noted that Hostetler was not much of a pull hitter, "but he's hustling all the time. That's why Chuck is keeping some pretty good men on the bench." By June 27, 1944, Hostetler's average had dipped to .318, but he was still fifth in the American League in batting average. For the season, Hostetler played 90 games, hit for a .298 batting average, scored 42 runs, collected 20 RBIs, 21 walks, four stolen bases, nine doubles, two triples, and a .350 on-base percentage.

== The "Hostetler flop" ==
Hostetler remained with the Tigers in 1945 as they won the American League pennant and advanced to the 1945 World Series. Hostetler played only sparingly in 1945, batting just .159 in 42 games; still the 42-year-old "begged" Detroit manager Steve O'Neill for a chance to appear in the World Series. Ultimately, Hostetler appeared as a pinch hitter three times in the Fall Classic, failing to get a hit. (As of 2024, Hostetler remains the oldest non-pitcher ever to appear in a World Series game.) However, it was his appearance in the sixth game for which he is best remembered: the infamous "Hostetler flop".

In the seventh inning of Game 6, with the Cubs ahead 5–1, Hostetler pinch hit for Skeeter Webb to start the inning. He hit a ground ball and was safe on an error. He advanced to second on a ground out by Eddie Mayo, and when Doc Cramer hit a single to left field, Hostetler ran through manager Steve O'Neill's stop sign at third base. He tried to stop halfway home, lost his footing, fell to the ground, and was tagged out while scrambling around on all fours.

One press account described it this way: "Hostetler fell flat on his face between third base and home in the seventh inning and was tagged out, helping break up a two-run Tiger rally." Detroit sports writer Joe Falls later called it "the Hostetler flop." Another account described Hostetler's efforts to swim home: "He tripped and fell rounding third base and tried unsuccessfully to 'swim' to the plate."

After Hostetler was thrown out, the Tigers rallied. Hank Greenberg walked, and Roy Cullenbine and Rudy York both hit consecutive run-scoring singles to cut the lead to 5-3. (Cullenbine's single would have scored Hostetler, if he had held up and stayed on third.)

Hostetler was replaced by Joe Hoover defensively at shortstop in the bottom of the seventh. Over the course of the next inning, both the Cubs and the Tigers rallied, with the Tigers eventually tying the game 7-7 in the 8th on a Greenberg home run. One writer noted that Greenberg's home run would given the Tigers the lead if only Hostetler had "stayed on his feet." Neither team scored in the ninth, and the game went into extra innings -- and the Tigers eventually lost, 8–7. As a result, Hostetler was the goat. After the game, a dejected Steve O'Neill said: "We would have won if Chuck Hostetler had only caught my signal to hold up when he was rounding third."

Luckily for Hostetler and the Tigers, Detroit clinched the Series two days later with a 9-3 win at Wrigley Field. Hostetler did not participate in Game 7; "The Hostetler Flop" in game 6 was the very last play of his professional career.

In January 1946, the Associated Press reported: "Chuck Hostetler, utility infielder who gained questionable fame for his World Series high dive rounding third base, has been released." In fact, Hostetler did not appear in another pro baseball game after his baserunning error in the 1945 World Series, finally retiring at age 42.

Years later, Hostetler spoke with baseball historian Fred Smith and recalled the embarrassing incident: "I’ll never forget it. I played only two years in the majors with the Tigers but this is what anyone ever talked about." Fifty years later, baseball writer Joe Falls was still peeved about Hostetler's blunder. In a column in the Detroit News, Falls wrote: "If anyone symbolized the futility of wartime baseball — both in Detroit and America — it was outfielder Chuck Hostetler of the Tigers, the man who fell on his face in the 1945 World Series."

Hostetler died in 1971 at age 67 in Fort Collins, Colorado. His obituary noted: "Hostetler gained some degree of fame when he was blamed for the Tigers loss of the sixth game of the 1945 World Series."

== See also ==
- 1945 Detroit Tigers season
