= Anse Moore =

American baseball player (1917–1993)

- Outfielder
- Born: September 22, 1917; Delhi, Louisiana, U.S.
- Died: October 29, 1993 (aged 76); Pearl, Mississippi, U.S.
- Batted: Left Threw: Right

MLB debut
- April 17, 1946, for the Detroit Tigers

Last MLB appearance
- September 29, 1946, for the Detroit Tigers

MLB statistics
- Batting average: .209
- Home runs: 1
- Runs batted in: 8
- Stats at Baseball Reference

Teams
- Detroit Tigers (1946)

Anselm Winn Moore (September 22, 1917 – October 29, 1993) was an American professional baseball player whose career spanned 1939–1942 and 1946–1953 and included a full season and 51 games played in Major League Baseball for the 1946 Detroit Tigers. An outfielder, Moore batted left-handed, threw right-handed, stood 6 feet 1 inch (1.85 m) tall and weighed 190 pounds (86 kg).

Moore was born in 1917 at Delhi, Louisiana. His professional baseball career began in 1939 with the Alexandria Aces of Alexandria, Louisiana. He played for Alexandria in 1939 and 1940 and the Beaumont Exporters of the Texas League in 1941 and 1942. He compiled a .293 batting average in 148 games for Beaumont in 1942. He missed the 1943, 1944, and 1945 seasons while serving in the European Theater of Operations for the United States Army during World War II.

After the war, Moore joined the Detroit Tigers i nearly 1946. Moore compiled a .209 batting average with 28 hits, 16 runs scored, eight runs batted in and one home run in 134 career at bats. He played 17 games in left field and 15 in right field. His lone homer, a solo shot, came off knuckleball pitcher Roger Wolff of the Washington Senators on May 14 at Briggs Stadium — representing the Tigers' only run in a 15–1 rout.

Moore continued playing in the minor leagues through the 1953 season, including stints with the Buffalo Bison (1947-1949), Baltimore Orioles (1950-1951), Toledo Mud Hens (1952), and Jackson Senators (1953).

Moore died at age 76 in Pearl, Mississippi.
