= Russ Kerns =

American baseball player (1920–2000)

- Pinch hitter
- Born: November 10, 1920; Fremont, Ohio, U.S.
- Died: August 21, 2000 (aged 79); Placerville, California, U.S.
- Batted: Left Threw: Right

MLB debut
- August 18, 1945, for the Detroit Tigers

Last MLB appearance
- August 18, 1945, for the Detroit Tigers

MLB statistics
- Games played: 1
- At bats: 1
- Hits: 0
- Stats at Baseball Reference

Teams
- Detroit Tigers (1945)

Russell Eldon Kerns (November 10, 1920 – August 21, 2000) was an American Major League Baseball player who played in one game for the Detroit Tigers on August 18, 1945. He went hitless in one at bat.
