= Walter Wilson (baseball) =

American baseball player (1913–1994)

- Pitcher
- Born: November 24, 1913; Glenn, Georgia, U.S
- Died: April 17, 1994 (aged 80); Bremen, Georgia, U.S.
- Batted: Left Threw: Right

MLB debut
- April 17, 1945, for the Detroit Tigers

Last MLB appearance
- September 10, 1945, for the Detroit Tigers

MLB statistics
- Win–loss record: 1-3
- Earned run average: 4.61
- Strikeouts: 28
- Stats at Baseball Reference

Teams
- Detroit Tigers (1945)

Career highlights and awards
- World Series champion (1945)

Walter Wood Wilson (November 24, 1913 – April 17, 1994) was an American professional baseball pitcher. He played one season in Major League Baseball for the Detroit Tigers in 1945. Listed at 6 ft 4 in (1.93 m), 190 lb., Wilson batted left-handed and threw right-handed. He was born in Glenn, Georgia.

Wilson began his professional career with the Concord Weavers of the Class D North Carolina State league in 1939. Wilson was one of many players who only appeared in the majors during World War II. He posted a 1–3 record with a 4.61 ERA in 25 appearances for Detroit, including four starts, giving up 40 runs (four unearned) on 76 hits and 35 walks while striking out 28 in 70.1 innings of work. He was on the Tigers roster for the 1945 World Series but did not appear in any game. After the 1945 season, he spent two more years in the minor leagues.

Wilson died in Bremen, Georgia, aged 80, and was buried in Glenn Cemetery in his hometown.
