= Ed Mierkowicz =

American baseball player (1924–2017)

- Leftfielder
- Born: March 6, 1924; Wyandotte, Michigan, U.S.
- Died: May 19, 2017 (aged 93); Bloomfield Hills, Michigan, U.S.
- Batted: Right Threw: Right

MLB debut
- August 31, 1945, for the Detroit Tigers

Last MLB appearance
- April 19, 1950, for the St. Louis Cardinals

MLB statistics
- Batting average: .175
- Home runs: 1
- Runs batted in: 4
- Stats at Baseball Reference

Teams
- Detroit Tigers (1945, 1947–1948); St. Louis Cardinals (1950)

Career highlights and awards
- World Series champion (1945)

Edward Frank Mierkowicz (March 6, 1924 – May 19, 2017), nicknamed "Mouse," was an American professional baseball player. He played in Major League Baseball from 1945 to 1950 as an outfielder for the Detroit Tigers and St. Louis Cardinals. Mierkowicz was a member of the world champion 1945 Detroit Tigers team.

== Early life ==
Mierkowicz was born in Wyandotte, Michigan, the son of a factory worker. He lettered in three sports at Roosevelt High School in Wyandotte. He played center for the basketball team and led them to the Michigan state finals. He also led the football team to a state championship. As a first baseman for the baseball team, he hit more home runs than any player in school history.

He was friends as a child with Bob Kuzava who went on to pitch for the New York Yankees.

In 1943, Mierkowicz was inducted into the Army. Mierkowicz was discharged after contracting rheumatic fever.

== Professional baseball ==
=== Minor leagues (1944–1945) ===
In February 1944, Mierkowicz was signed by Wish Egan for the Detroit Tigers. He was assigned to the Buffalo Bisons who in turn optioned him to the Hagerstown Owls of the Inter-State League. He appeared in 139 games for Hagerstown during the 1944 season, appearing in 139 games and compiling a .331 batting average with 90 hits, 44 extra-base hits, and 94 RBIs.

Mierkowicz spent most of the 1945 season with the Buffalo Bisons. He appeared in 131 games for Buffalo, compiled a .303 batting average, scored 91 runs and tallied 67 extra-base hits, 23 home runs, and 94 RBIs.

=== Detroit Tigers (1945) ===
Mierkowicz was called up by the Detroit Tigers in late August 1945. He collected his first major-league hit on September 11 at Fenway Park in Boston; he hit a double in the ninth inning that scored Rudy York with the game-winning run. He played in 10 games in 1945, tallying two hits, a walk and two RBIs in 15 at bats.

The Tigers won the American League pennant and defeated the Chicago Cubs in the 1945 World Series. Mierkowicz appeared as a defensive replacement for Hank Greenberg in the ninth inning of Game 7. Mierkowicz did not bat in the Series but he received a World Series ring in his rookie season.

=== 1946 to 1950 seasons ===
In 1946, Mierkowicz spent most of the season in the minor leagues with Buffalo, but he did play in 21 games with the Tigers, batting .190. In 1948, he appeared in 3 games.

He finished his major-league career on April 19, 1950, with the St. Louis Cardinals. He struck out in his one and only at bat for the Cardinals.

=== Minor leagues (1951–1957) ===
Mierkowicz continued to play in the minor leagues from 1951 to 1957. He played for the Rochester Red Wings during the 1949, 1950, 1951, and 1953 seasons. He also had stints with the Houston Buffaloes (1952), Richmond Virginians (1954)Syracuse Chiefs (1954-1955), Sacramento Solons (1955), and Buffalo Bisons (1956). He concluded his career in 1957 with the San Antonio Missions, appearing in 99 games and compiling a .262 batting average.

He said his major-league career "was like a cup of coffee but no cream" but added that "God gave me the ability to play ball. Made a pretty good living. We didn't make a lot of money, but it was a lot of fun."

== Later life ==
After his playing career ended, Mierkowicz lived in Wayne County, Michigan, working at a bar and as a mechanic and machinist. He also worked for 24 years at a waste treatment plant in Wyandotte, Michigan. He retired in 1984. Interviewed in 2016, he recalled that he had "just lived a normal life." He lived for most of his later years in Grosse Ile, Michigan.

Mierkowicz fell at his apartment in Bloomfield Hills, Michigan, in February 2016, injuring his hip, leg and foot. Following the injury, he gained press attention as the last surviving member for the 1945 Detroit Tigers. After his release from the hospital, he stayed at a rehabilitation facility in Troy, Michigan. He fell and broke his hip for a second time and was placed in a nursing center in West Bloomfield, Michigan. He died on May 19, 2017.
