= Bubba Floyd =

American baseball player (1917–2000)

- Shortstop
- Born: June 23, 1917; Dallas, Texas, U.S.
- Died: December 15, 2000 (aged 83); Dallas, Texas, U.S.
- Batted: Right Threw: Right

MLB debut
- June 16, 1944, for the Detroit Tigers

Last MLB appearance
- June 18, 1944, for the Detroit Tigers

MLB statistics
- Games played: 3
- Plate appearances: 10
- Hits: 4
- Stats at Baseball Reference

Teams
- Detroit Tigers (1944)

Leslie Roe "Bubba" Floyd (June 23, 1917 – December 15, 2000) was an American Major League Baseball shortstop who played in three games for the Detroit Tigers in 1944. The 26-year-old rookie stood 5 ft 11 in (1.80 m) and weighed 160 lbs.

Floyd was one of many ballplayers who only appeared in the major leagues during World War II. From June 16 to June 18 he was in the starting lineup for three games against the St. Louis Browns at Briggs Stadium. He hit very well, going 4-for-9 (.444) with a double and a run scored. He drew one walk to give him an even .500 on-base percentage. In the field he handled nine chances without an error.

He died in his hometown of Dallas, Texas at the age of 83.
