= Joe Hoover =

American baseball player (1915–1965)

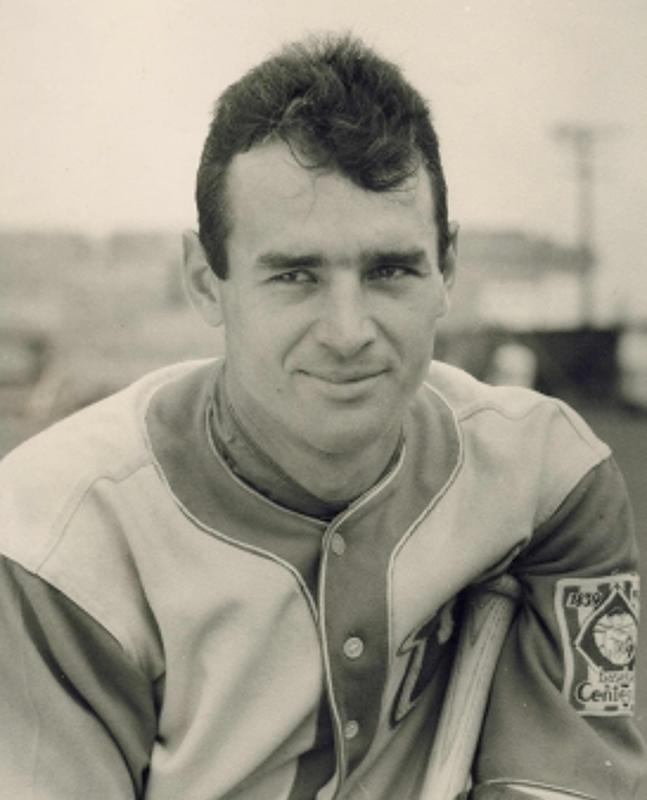
- Hoover in 1939 with the Hollywood Stars
- Shortstop
- Born: April 15, 1915; Brawley, California, U.S.
- Died: September 2, 1965 (aged 50); Los Angeles, California, U.S.
- Batted: Right Threw: Right

MLB debut
- April 21, 1943, for the Detroit Tigers

Last MLB appearance
- September 23, 1945, for the Detroit Tigers

MLB statistics
- Batting average: .243
- Home runs: 5
- Runs batted in: 84
- Stats at Baseball Reference

Teams
- Detroit Tigers (1943–1945)

Career highlights and awards
- World Series champion (1945)

Robert Joseph Hoover (April 15, 1915 – September 2, 1965) was an American professional baseball player from 1937 to 1946. He played three years in Major League Baseball as a shortstop for the Detroit Tigers from 1943 to 1945. He also played six years in the Pacific Coast League (PCL) for the Hollywood Stars from 1938 to 1942 and the San Francisco Seals in 1946. He won a World Series championship with the Tigers in 1945 and a PCL pennant with the Seals in 1946. He was also selected as a PCL all-star and the Hollywood Stars' most valuable player in 1942 when he hit for a .327 batting average.

== Early years ==
Hoover was born in Brawley, in Imperial County, California, in 1915. He was the son of Robert Jasper Hoover and Estelle Goldie (Eli) Hoover. He is of Scotch-Irish-English-German descent. The family surname was changed by his grandfather from "Heuber" to Hoover due to constant mispronounciation. He had two sisters, Barbara and Miriam. The family moved to Pomona, California when Joe was a child. He attended Pomona High School where he starred in baseball, as an end in football, and as a guard in basketball. He next attended Pomona Junior College where he played college football in the fall of 1934 and college baseball in the spring of 1935.

== Professional baseball ==
=== Indianapolis and Rock Island ===
In 1937, Hoover signed with the Indianapolis Indians of the American Association. He was farmed out to the Rock Island Islanders of the Western League. He returned to Indianapolis late in the 1937 season. During the 1937, Hoover played at catcher, shortstop, left field, and center field. He compiled a .273 average in 30 games for Indianapolis and .242 in 62 games for Rock Island.

=== Hollywood Stars ===
In 1938, Hoover did not report to Indianapolis and refused to sign a contract with the club. In April, he was sold to the Hollywood Stars of the Pacific Coast League. He earned a reputation for versatility with the Stars, logging time at shortstop, second base, outfield, and as a pitcher. In 1939, he appeared in 137 games for the Stars while compiling a .298 batting average and .425 slugging percentage.

Hoover became Hollywood's starting shortstop in 1940. As his defensive performance improved, Hollywood manager Bill Sweeney boasted: "If the Stars suddenly acquired the best shortstop in the majors today that player couldn't get Hoover out of my lineup." The Stars held a "Joe Hoover Night" at Gilmore Field in July 1940 at which Pomona's mayor paid tribute to Hoover.

He appeared in a career-high 164 games for the Stars in 1941, though his batting average dropped to .235. The Pomona newspaper in 1941 summed up Hoover's path to success:

A worker, Joe went into baseball the hard way, doing little talking, playing many positions, showing determination and love for the game. He hasn't set the world on fire with his hitting, but he improved his fielding to the extent that he's recognized as one of the best shortstops in the coast league. . . . Joe never was one of those 'naturals' you hear so much about. But he was endowed with a varied ability that kept him on squads because he could play many positions."

In 1942, Hoover blossomed as a hitter, compiling a .327 batting average with 34 doubles, 10 triples, 11 home runs, 62 RBIs and 14 stolen bases. He was selected as a Pacific League All-Star and the Stars' most valuable player, and was named by the Helms Athletic Foundation as Southern California's "athlete of the months" for July 1942. His .327 batting average was fourth best in the PCL during the 1942 season.

=== Detroit Tigers ===
On October 1, 1942, the Detroit Tigers purchased Hoover from the Stars after all three Detroit shortstops — Billy Hitchcock, Johnny Lipon, and Murray Franklin — were inducted in the military during World War II. Hoover had a draft deferred status as a married man with a family. At the time of Detroit's purchase of Hoover, The Sporting News described him as "hustle personified" and "not a chatterbox type." Physically, it described him as "a regular Adonis" with a "wasp-like waist" and "a fine pair of shoulders and a strong pair of legs to keep him in the lineup day after day."

Hoover became the Tigers' starting shortstop in 1943, appearing in 144 games at the position. He hit for .243 average and led the American League in outs with 478 and in sacrifice hits with 28. He was also second in the league with 101 strikeouts.

Before the start of the 1944 season, Hoover was reclassified as 1A by the draft board, raising fears that the Tigers would lose yet another shortstop to the war. Nevertheless, Hoover remained the Tigers starting shortstop in 1944. His batting average dipped to .236, but he was steady defensively, ranking second in the American League in range factor (5.55) and double plays turned (102) by a shortstop. He also ranked third in the league in putouts by a shortstop with 256.

In his final major league season, Hoover was a member of the 1945 Detroit Tigers team that won the American League pennant and defeated the Chicago Cubs in the 1945 World Series. However, after two seasons as the team's everyday shortstop, Hoover in 1945 divided shortstop duties with Skeeter Webb; Hoover started 55 games at shortstop, while Webb started 99. Hoover's last major league appearance came in Game 6 of the 1945 World Series. He had a single in three World Series at bats. He also had an RBI and scored a run in an 8–7 loss to the Cubs.

In 338 major league games over three seasons, Hoover posted a .243 batting average (301-for-1238) with 177 runs, 5 home runs, 84 RBI and 92 bases on balls. Defensively, he recorded a .940 fielding percentage.

=== San Francisco Seals ===
On January 24, 1946, the Tigers sold Hoover to the San Francisco Seals in the Pacific Coast League. Hoover compiled a career low .200 batting average in 87 games for the Seals. The San Francisco Seals won the PCL pennant, giving Hoover an MLB championship in 1945 and a PCL championship in 1946.

== Family and later years ==
Hoover was married to Alice Smith Andres in November 1935. They had one child, Joethel Ann, born in 1941. The marriage ended with divorce and he married Hazel "Ginger" Bingham in 1953/1954. They had one daughter, Malea Madeline, born in 1955.

After retiring from baseball he owned a gas station in Los Angeles.

On Christmas Day 12/25), 1960 Joe suffered a heart attack. He was just 44 years of age. He died in Los Angeles in 1965 at age 50. He was buried at San Gorgonio Memorial Park in Banning, California.

== See also ==
- 1945 Detroit Tigers season
