= Zeb Eaton =

American baseball player (1920–1989)

- Pitcher
- Born: February 2, 1920; Cooleemee, North Carolina, U.S.
- Died: December 17, 1989 (aged 69); West Palm Beach, Florida, U.S.
- Batted: Right Threw: Right

MLB debut
- April 18, 1944, for the Detroit Tigers

Last MLB appearance
- September 25, 1945, for the Detroit Tigers

MLB statistics
- Win–loss record: 4–2
- Earned run average: 4.43
- Strikeouts: 19
- Stats at Baseball Reference

Teams
- Detroit Tigers (1944–1945)

Career highlights and awards
- World Series champion (1945)

Zebulon Vance Eaton (February 2, 1920 – December 17, 1989), nicknamed "Red", was an American right-handed pitcher. He played professional baseball for 11 seasons between 1939 and 1956, including two seasons in Major League Baseball with the Detroit Tigers in 1944 and 1945.

== Early years ==
Eaton was born in 1920 in Cooleemee, North Carolina.

== Professional baseball player ==
Eaton began his professional baseball career in 1939 playing for the Cooleemee Cools in the North Carolina State League. He then spent the 1941 season with the Beaumont Exporters in the Texas League.

After the United States entered World War II, Eaton enlisted in the Army; he played for an Army baseball team at Camp Wolters. He received a medical discharge in December 1943.

Upon being discharged from the Army, Eaton signed with the Detroit Tigers. He played in six games for the Tigers in 1944 with no decisions and a 5.74 earned run average (ERA).

In 1945, he played in 17 games and had a record of 4–2 with an improved ERA of 4.05. Eaton also contributed as a hitter in 1945, with two home runs, 10 RBIs, and a double in 32 at-bats. On July 15, 1945, he hit a 450-foot home run with the bases loaded against the New York Yankees. He hit a second home run on August 8, a 400-foot blow to left-center field against the Boston Red Sox.

Eaton's last major league appearance came as a pinch hitter in Game 1 of the 1945 World Series. He pinch-hit for pitcher Al Benton and struck out.

Eaton continued to play in the minor leagues for several years, including stints with the Buffalo Bisons of the International League (1944, 1946, 1949, 1956), the Birmingham Barons of the Southern Association (1947), Shreveport Sports of the Texas League (1950), the Greenwood Tigers of the Tri-State League (1951), and the Gastonia Rockets of the Tri-State League (1952).

== Later years ==
Eaton died in 1989 in West Palm Beach, Florida. He was buried at Elmlawn Cemetery in the town of Tonawanda, New York.
