= Hack Miller (catcher) =

American baseball player (1913–1966)

- Catcher
- Born: February 13, 1913; Celeste, Texas, U.S.
- Died: November 21, 1966 (aged 53); Dallas, Texas, U.S.
- Batted: Right Threw: Right

MLB debut
- April 19, 1944, for the Detroit Tigers

Last MLB appearance
- July 5, 1945, for the Detroit Tigers

MLB statistics
- Batting average: .444
- Home runs: 1
- Runs batted in: 4
- Games played: 7
- Stats at Baseball Reference

Teams
- Detroit Tigers (1944–1945)

Career highlights and awards
- World Series champion (1945); Hit a home run in his first major league at-bat

James Eldridge "Hack" Miller (February 13, 1913 – November 21, 1966) was an American catcher in Major League Baseball who played for the Detroit Tigers in 1944 and 1945. He also played 12 seasons in minor league baseball. Miller threw and batted right-handed and was listed at 5 feet 11 inches (1.80 m) tall and 215 pounds (98 kg).

Born in Celeste, Texas, Miller grew up in Abilene and attended North Texas State and Southeast Oklahoma State Teachers College before beginning his pro baseball career as an outfielder in 1935; he made the transition to catching in 1938. He played in seven Major League games in his career, batting .444 with one home run and four runs batted in; the home run came in his first career at-bat on April 23, 1944, against the Cleveland Indians and lefthander Al Smith. After his playing career ended, Miller managed minor league teams in various Texas cities including Lubbock, Tyler, Wichita Falls, Abilene and Big Spring.

He was on the Tigers' roster for the 1945 World Series win over the Chicago Cubs, but did not appear in any games.

He died at age 53 in Dallas and was buried at Hillcrest Cemetery in Forney, Kaufman County, Texas.

== See also ==
- Home run in first Major League at-bat
