= Jimmy Outlaw =

American baseball player (1913–2006)

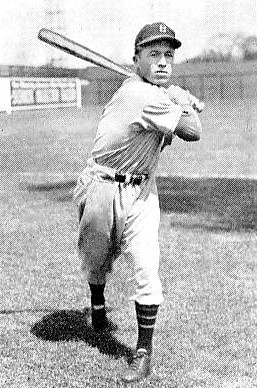
- Outlaw in 1940
- Outfielder / Third baseman
- Born: January 20, 1913; Orme, Tennessee, U.S.
- Died: April 9, 2006 (aged 93); Jackson, Alabama, U.S.
- Batted: Right Threw: Right

MLB debut
- April 20, 1937, for the Cincinnati Reds

Last MLB appearance
- May 8, 1949, for the Detroit Tigers

MLB statistics
- Batting average: .268
- Home runs: 6
- Runs batted in: 184
- Stats at Baseball Reference

Teams
- Cincinnati Reds (1937–1938); Boston Bees (1939); Detroit Tigers (1943–1949)

Career highlights and awards
- World Series champion (1945)

James Paulus Outlaw (January 20, 1913 – April 9, 2006) was an American professional baseball player. He played all or part of 10 seasons in Major League Baseball (MLB) as an outfielder and third baseman for the Cincinnati Reds, Boston Bees, and Detroit Tigers.

Outlaw played college baseball for the Auburn Tigers and was signed in 1934 by the Cincinnati Reds. He played three years in the minor leagues, batting .351 for the Decatur Commodores, leading the Illinois–Indiana–Iowa League in hits in 1935, and batting .330 as an All-Star third baseman for the Nashville Volunteers in 1936.

He made his major league debut with the Cincinnati Reds in 1937, appearing in 49 games before returning to the minor leagues.

He next played with the Syracuse Chiefs of the International League in 1937 and 1938, compiling a .339 batting average in 1938. He returned to the major leagues in 1939 with the Boston Bees but ended up in the International League again from 1940 to 1943, playing with the Buffalo Bisons.

In August 1943, Outlaw was acquired by the Detroit Tigers, with whom he played as an outfielder and third baseman until May 1949. He was a starter in the outfield for the Tigers in his first full major league season in 1944, appearing in 132 games. In 1945, he began the season as the Tigers' starting left fielder but moved to third base to make room for Hank Greenberg upon his return from military service in June 1945. He played third base in all seven games of the Tigers' 1945 World Series championship against the Chicago Cubs.

In 10 major league seasons, Outlaw compiled a .268 batting average with 6 home runs, 184 RBIs, 257 runs, 79 doubles, 17 triples, 24 stolen bases, and a .333 on-base percentage. Outlaw made his home in Jackson, Alabama, where he died in 2006 at age 93.

He was inducted into the Alabama Sports Hall of Fame in 1990.

== Early years ==
James Outlaw was born in Orme, Tennessee, in 1913. He attended Alabama Polytechnic Institute, now Auburn University, for two years. Although he had never worn a baseball uniform before enrolling at Auburn, he played at the shortstop and/or outfield positions for the Auburn Tigers baseball team in 1932 and/or 1933.

== Professional baseball career ==
=== Minor leagues ===
Outlaw was signed by Milton Stock, scout for the Cincinnati Reds, in 1934. He spent the 1934 season playing as a third baseman for the Jeannette Reds (Pennsylvania State Association) and Beckley Black Knights (Middle Atlantic League). He compiled a .340 batting average with 16 doubles, 7 triples, and 9 home runs in 209 at bats for Jeannette.

In 1935, Outlaw was promoted to the "Class B" level with the Decatur Commodores of the Illinois–Indiana–Iowa League. He played at third base for Decatur and hit for a .351 average with 27 doubles, 17 triples, and 6 home runs in 447 at bats. He also led the Three-I League in total hits for the 1935 season.

In 1936, Outlaw was promoted to the "Class A" level with the Nashville Volunteers of the Southern Association as their starting third baseman, compiling a .330 batting average with 46 doubles, 9 triples, and 7 home runs in 643 at bats. He was selected as an All-Star at third base while playing for Nashville.

=== Cincinnati Reds ===
In 1937, Outlaw made his major league debut with the Cincinnati Reds. In his first major league game on April 20, 1937, Outlaw had three hits off Dizzy Dean. Outlaw appeared in 49 games for the 1937 Reds, a team which finished in last place in the National League with a 56-98 record. Playing as a backup to incumbent third baseman Lew Riggs, Outlaw compiled a .273 batting average in 165 at bats during his rookie season with the Reds. In 1938, Outlaw appeared in just four games with the Reds, being used exclusively in pinch run situations.

=== Syracuse Chiefs ===
After his initial stint with the Reds, Outlaw was sent to the Syracuse Chiefs of the International League where he appeared in 65 games for the Chiefs in 1937 and 114 games in 1938. After his first season in Syracuse, Outlaw was moved from third base to the outfield, appearing in 108 games in the outfield in 1938. Outlaw compiled a .339 batting average for Syracuse in 1938 and added 25 doubles and 9 triples in 416 at bats.

=== Boston Bees ===
Jimmy Outlaw autograph on a 1988 Play Ball card reprint (#155)

After his outstanding performance with Syracuse in 1938, Outlaw became a hot prospect. In the course of three months at the end of the 1938 season, Outlaw was traded, drafted or sold four times. On September 9, 1938, the Reds sold him to the Brooklyn Dodgers from the Cincinnati Reds, although the sale was voided on September 14, 1938, with Outlaw being returned to the Reds. On October 4, 1938, the St. Louis Cardinals drafted Outlaw from the Reds in the 1938 Rule 5 draft. Finally, on December 13, 1938, he was traded by the Cardinals to the Dodgers in exchange for Lew Krausse and cash. On the same date, he was traded by the Dodgers with Buddy Hassett to the Boston Bees in exchange for Ira Hutchinson and Gene Moore.

Outlaw played in 65 games for Boston in 1939, including appearances at all three outfield positions. However, his batting average dipped to .263 with only two doubles and no triples or home runs in 133 at bats.

=== Buffalo Bisons ===
On March 23, 1940, the Buffalo Bisons of the International League purchased Outlaw from the Boston Bees. Outlaw began the 1940 season with a league-leading .391 batting average, but in late June 1940, he was hit on the wrist by a fastball thrown by Steve "The Mad Russian" Rachunok. Outlaw was out of the lineup for 10 days, and when he returned, his batting stroke was not the same. His batting average "melted" for the rest of the season, though he still finished with a .309 average for the 1940 season. He remained in Buffalo for four years, appeared in 563 games for the Bisons, and compiled batting averages of .309, .264, .263, and .277.

=== Detroit Tigers ===
==== 1943-44 seasons ====
On August 26, 1943, the Detroit Tigers purchased Outlaw and pitcher Rufe Gentry from Buffalo for $17,500. The Tigers acquired Outlaw at the urging of manager Steve O'Neill, who had managed Outlaw in Buffalo in 1940. O'Neill noted, "Jimmy's a hustler, a grand team player, and there's not a selfish streak in him. I've known him a long time and never met a grander man." In his first game for Detroit, Outlaw hit a home run off Cleveland Indians pitcher Al Smith. Outlaw played in 20 games for the 1943 Tigers, including appearances at all three outfield positions, hitting for a .269 average in 67 at bats on the season.

By the end of the 1943 season, the Tigers had already lost two left fielders (Hank Greenberg and Barney McCosky) to military service, and a third (Dick Wakefield) was then departing. In December 1943, Detroit manager Steve O'Neill announced Outlaw would take over as the Tigers' starting left fielder in 1944. Outlaw had been designated 4F due to flat feet. Outlaw appeared in 139 games for the 1944 Tigers, including 69 games in left field, 60 games in right field, and eight games in center field. In his first full season in the major leagues, he posted career-highs in batting average (.273), runs (69) hits (146), doubles (20), triples (6), home runs (3), RBIs (57) and games played (139). Prior to 1944, Outlaw had never played in more than 65 major league games in a season. He also ranked fourth in the American League with 14 assists from the outfield. He had a fielding average of .967. In a June 1944 feature story about Outlaw in The Sporting News, Detroit manager Steve O'Neill, who had previously managed Outlaw while both were in Buffalo, praised Outlaw effusively:

"I know what Jimmy can do. He should've been in the majors three years ago. He's hard to fool up there at the plate. We can depend on him for a bunt or for the hit and run. He's got speed and intelligence. What's more, he hustles. I've never heard of him sulking. I wish I had a dozen like him."

==== 1945 season ====
In 1945, Outlaw appeared in 132 games for the Tigers. He began the season as the team's primary left fielder, appearing in 82 games at the position. He also played 17 games at center and eight at right, while hitting .271 with seven home runs and 45 RBIs.

In late June 1945, Hank Greenberg returned from World War II, creating a coaching dilemma for manager O'Neill. O'Neill moved Greenberg into the lineup in his pre-war position in left field, which necessitated moving Outlaw elsewhere. O'Neill considered moving Outlaw to right field, where he had played for the latter half of the 1944 season (after Wakefield returned), but that would have required benching Roy Cullenbine. O'Neill opted instead to move Outlaw to third base, where Outlaw had played earlier in his career. At the time, Detroit sports writer Sam Greene wrote that "Outlaw's gift of speed and recent batting consistency have made him one of the most valuable Tigers." Outlaw played 21 games at third base in the regular season and started all seven games of the 1945 World Series at third base. He hit .179 (5-for-28) in the Series, scoring one run while driving in three more. Detroit beat the Chicago Cubs. Teammate Les Mueller described Outlaw this way:

"Jimmy Outlaw was the type of player that was always hustling. The type of guy that would get his uniform dirty and he did a good job. This was especially true when Greenberg joined us, and they moved him from outfield to third base. . . . He was a pepper pot. He was the type of guy who was always kidding around ... in the clubhouse or the dugout, and kept the guys loose."

Teammate Red Borom also recalled Outlaw as a pepper pot, needling veterans Hank Greenberg and Rudy York and reminding his teammates that they had to play hard and focus on winning every day. Borom described Outlaw as "a very versatile player, a good baserunner, and played the infield as well as the outfield." In a column published at the end of September 1945, J. G. Taylor Spink, editor of The Sporting News, expressed his happiness in the success of Outlaw. Spink described Outlaw as a hard worker who considered conditioning to be "a fetish", a man who rarely drank even a beer and who went to bed early and rose early for breakfast every day with his four-year-old son Perry and wife Gracie. Spink added: "Jimmy has no interest in clubhouse politics. He is mild-mannered. He never has been thrown out of a ball game, nor has he ever staged any sort of a rhubarb against an umpire."

==== 1946-49 seasons ====
In 1946, Outlaw appeared in 92 games for the Tigers, 43 in the outfield and 38 at third base. By late June, he was batting .290, and Detroit sports writer Watson Spoelstra wrote that Outlaw "may be viewed as the team's most consistent hitter" with the exception of the recently acquired third baseman George Kell. Outlaw's performance trailed off in the second half of the 1946 season as he compiled a .261 average in 299 at bats.

In 1947, Outlaw proved to be a versatile handyman for the Tigers. Though relegated to a reserve role, he played well at third base when George Kell was injured, in left field when Dick Wakefield was injured, and in center field when Hoot Evers was injured. He continued to serve in a backup role at third base and outfield for Detroit in 1948, appearing in 74 games. He appeared in only five games for the Tigers in 1948, making his last major league appearance on May 8, 1949, at age 36.

=== Minor league player/manager ===
In May 1949, Outlaw was sold by the Tigers to the Sacramento Solons of the Pacific Coast League. Several minor league clubs bid on Outlaw, but the Tigers accommodated Outlaw's desire to play in Sacramento for manager Del Baker, the former manager of the Tigers. Outlaw compiled a .105 average in 38 at bats for the Solons in 1949. He concluded his playing career in 1950 with the Miami Beach Flamingos in the Florida International League; he had a .254 average in 177 at bats. He also served as manager of the Flamingos during the 1950 season.

=== MLB statistics ===
In a 10-season major league career, Outlaw was a .268 hitter (529 for 1,974) with six home runs and 184 RBIs in 650 games, including 257 runs, 79 doubles, 17 triples, 24 stolen bases, and a .333 on-base percentage.

== Later years ==
Following his playing career, Outlaw worked for the Dairy Fresh Milk Co. in Jackson, Alabama, and became active in the Jackson Civitan Club.

He was inducted into the Alabama Sports Hall of Fame in 1990.

Outlaw died in 2006 at an Alabama hospital at the age of 93.
