= Les Mueller =

American baseball player (1919–2012)

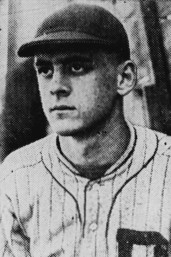
- Pitcher
- Born: March 4, 1919; Belleville, Illinois, U.S.
- Died: October 25, 2012 (aged 93); Belleville, Illinois, U.S.
- Batted: Right Threw: Right

MLB debut
- August 15, 1941, for the Detroit Tigers

Last MLB appearance
- September 23, 1945, for the Detroit Tigers

MLB statistics
- Win–loss record: 6–8
- Earned run average: 3.78
- Strikeouts: 50
- Stats at Baseball Reference

Teams
- Detroit Tigers (1941, 1945)

Career highlights and awards
- World Series champion (1945)

Leslie Clyde Mueller (March 4, 1919 – October 25, 2012) was an American right-handed pitcher in Major League Baseball who played for the Detroit Tigers in 1941 and 1945. He was born in Belleville, Illinois.

In 1940, Mueller played for the Beaumont Exporters in the Texas League and threw a no-hitter on August 22, 1940 against Dallas. The following year, Mueller reached the big leagues, pitching four games for the Detroit Tigers. He enlisted in the Army after the United States entered World War II and missed the next three seasons. After a physical revealed that he had a hernia, Mueller received a medical discharge in late 1944.

Mueller rejoined the Tigers for the 1945 season, going 6-8 in 26 games, including 18 games as a starter.

On April 17, 1945, Mueller faced Pete Gray, the St. Louis Browns' famous one-armed outfielder, in Gray's first major league game. Gray got his first major league hit off Mueller, the first of 51 hits for Gray in 1945.

On July 21, 1945, Mueller put in one of the greatest pitching performances in major league history. Mueller pitched the first 19-2/3 innings for the Tigers and left having given up only one unearned run. No pitcher has thrown as many innings in a major league game since Mueller's feat. The game lasted 4 hours and 48 minutes before umpire Bill Summers called the game a tie due to darkness at 7:48 p.m.

When Tigers manager Steve O'Neill removed Mueller, the pitcher asked, "Gee, Steve, the game isn't over, is it?"

Mueller also pitched two scoreless innings in Game 1 of the 1945 World Series.

Mueller was sent to the minors in 1946 and finished his career pitching in Buffalo, Newark, and Kansas City.

After his baseball career ended, Mueller returned to Belleville, Illinois, where he worked in the family's furniture store until he retired in 1976.
