= Dizzy Trout =

American baseball player (1915–1972)

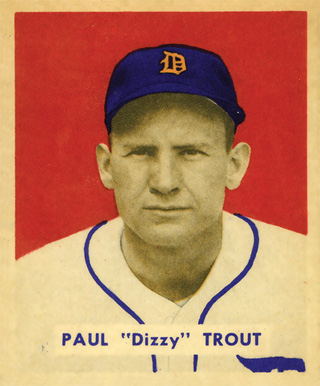
- Pitcher
- Born: June 29, 1915; Sandcut, Indiana, U.S.
- Died: February 28, 1972 (aged 56); Harvey, Illinois, U.S.
- Batted: Right Threw: Right

MLB debut
- April 25, 1939, for the Detroit Tigers

Last MLB appearance
- September 11, 1957, for the Baltimore Orioles

MLB statistics
- Win–loss record: 170–161
- Earned run average: 3.23
- Strikeouts: 1,256
- Stats at Baseball Reference

Teams
- Detroit Tigers (1939–1952); Boston Red Sox (1952); Baltimore Orioles (1957)

Career highlights and awards
- 2× All-Star (1944, 1947); World Series champion (1945); AL wins leader (1943); MLB ERA leader (1944)

Paul Howard "Dizzy" Trout (June 29, 1915 – February 28, 1972) was an American professional baseball player. He played in Major League Baseball as a right-handed pitcher from 1939 to 1952, most notably as a member of the Detroit Tigers team that finished either in first or second place in the American League pennant races between 1944 and 1947 and won the 1945 World Series. The two-time All-Star player was the American League wins leader in 1943 and, was the league ERA leader in 1944. In 1957, Trout made a brief comeback attempt at the age of 42 with the Baltimore Orioles. He also played for the Boston Red Sox.

== 1939–1942 ==
Trout was born in Sandcut, Indiana. He first played professionally in 1935 with the Terre Haute Tots in the Three-I League before signing with the Tigers in 1939. In his first four seasons (1939–1942), Dizzy Trout never had a winning record and totaled 33 wins and 44 losses. Even in 1940, as the Tigers won the American League pennant, Trout finished 3–7.

== 1943–1947 ==
Dizzy Trout was classified 4-F due to hearing impairment and was not accepted for military service during World War II. It was during the war years that Trout had his best seasons.

Trout had a losing record in his first four seasons, but in the next four years (1943–1946) he turned into one of the best pitchers in the American League, winning 82 and losing 54.

Dizzy Trout led the American League in wins (20) in 1943, but his best season was 1944, when he won 27 games and lost 14. He led the American League that year in ERA (2.12), complete games (33), shutouts (7), and innings pitched (352-1/3). He also finished second in the league to his Detroit teammate, Hal Newhouser, in wins (27) and strikeouts (144). The Tigers' pitching duo of Trout and Newhouser won 56 games in 1944 and finished 1–2 in ERA, wins, innings pitched, strikeouts, complete games, and shutouts. Newhouser and Trout also finished 1–2 in the American League MVP voting, with Trout trailing Newhouser in the voting by only 4 votes.

Trout's pitching totals were not as impressive in 1945, but he was a workhorse in the pennant drive. He pitched six games and won four over a nine-game late-season stretch. In Game 4 of the 1945 World Series, Trout beat the Cubs 4–1 on a five-hitter. The Tigers won the 1945 World Series, and Trout went 1–1 with an ERA of 0.66 in the Series.

== 1947–1952 ==
From 1947 to 1949, Trout's performance dropped off, as he failed to achieve a winning record, and had a total record of 23–31. Aside from his pitching, Trout could hit for power. He hit 20 home runs, tying him for 11th all-time in home runs by pitchers. He hit a 9th inning grand slam against the Washington Senators on July 28, 1949, helping the Tigers to a victory.

In 1950, Trout and the Tigers both turned things around. Trout won 13 and lost only 5, and the Tigers won 95 games and narrowly lost the American League pennant to the Yankees.

On June 3, 1952, Trout was sent to the Boston Red Sox in a blockbuster trade that sent Walt Dropo, Don Lenhardt, Johnny Pesky, Fred Hatfield, and Bill Wight to the Tigers for Trout, George Kell, Hoot Evers, and Johnny Lipon. Trout started only 17 games for the Red Sox, and retired at the end of the 1952 season.

Trout was a very good hitting pitcher in his 15-year major league career. He posted a .213 batting average (205-for-961) scoring 99 runs with 28 doubles, 7 triples, 20 home runs, 110 RBI and drew 59 bases on balls. He was in double figures in RBI in five seasons, with a high of 24 RBI in 1944.

== Retirement ==
After retiring from baseball, Trout called play-by-play for the Tigers on radio WKMH and TV WJBK-TV from 1953 to 1955. He also hosted The Knot-Hole Gang, a sports show aimed at children. Trout broadcast the Tigers games with Van Patrick and became popular with Detroit fans for his self-effacing humor, scrambled syntax, and folksy demeanor.

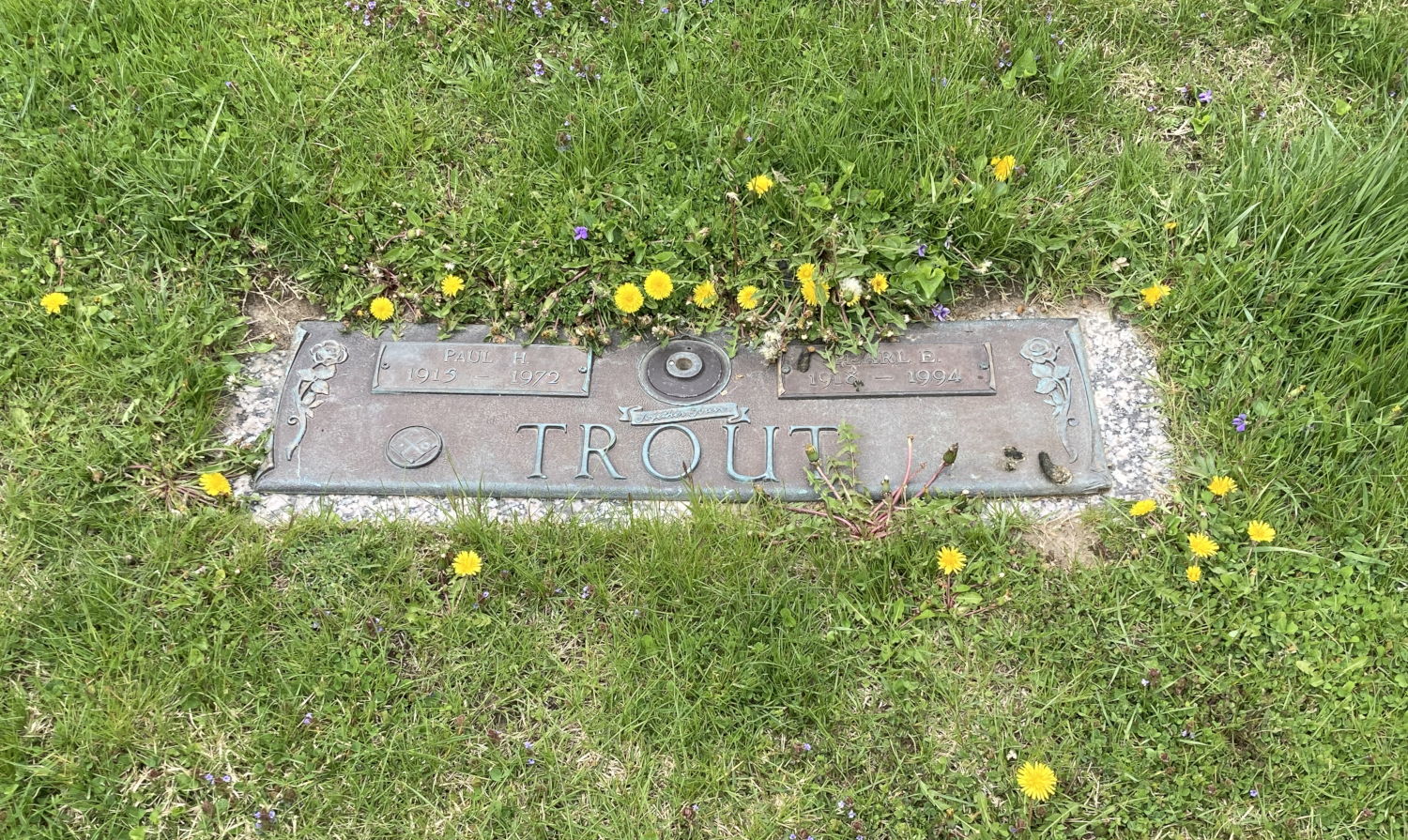
Trout's grave at Homewood Memorial Gardens

In 1956, Trout ran unsuccessfully for sheriff in Wayne County as a Republican, losing to 16-year incumbent Andrew C. Baird.

He attempted a return to baseball with the Baltimore Orioles in 1957 at age 42. Trout made two appearances, allowed three earned runs, and retired one batter, for an 81.00 ERA. After being released by Baltimore, he joined the Chicago White Sox as a pitching instructor and then worked with that organization's front office until his death from stomach cancer at the age of 56 on February 28, 1972, at Ingalls Hospital in Harvey, Illinois. He was buried at Homewood Memorial Gardens in Homewood, Illinois.

He was inducted into the Indiana Baseball Hall of Fame in 1981.

Trout's son, Steve, pitched for 12 years in the major leagues.

== See also ==
- Best pitching seasons by a Detroit Tiger
- 1945 Detroit Tigers season
- 1950 Detroit Tigers season
- List of Major League Baseball annual ERA leaders
- List of Major League Baseball annual wins leaders
- List of Major League Baseball all-time leaders in home runs by pitchers
