= Eddie Mayo =

American baseball player (1910–2006)

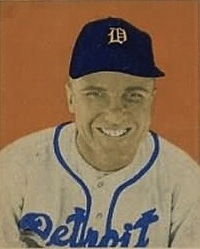
- Mayo's 1949 Bowman Gum baseball card
- Second baseman / Third baseman
- Born: April 15, 1910; Holyoke, Massachusetts, U.S.
- Died: November 27, 2006 (aged 96); Banning, California, U.S.
- Batted: Left Threw: Right

MLB debut
- May 22, 1936, for the New York Giants

Last MLB appearance
- October 3, 1948, for the Detroit Tigers

MLB statistics
- Batting average: .252
- Home runs: 26
- Runs batted in: 287
- Stats at Baseball Reference

Teams
- New York Giants (1936); Boston Bees (1937–1938); Philadelphia Athletics (1943); Detroit Tigers (1944–1948)

Career highlights and awards
- All-Star (1945); World Series champion (1945)

Edward Joseph Mayo (born Edward Joseph Mayoski; April 15, 1910 – November 27, 2006), nicknamed "Hotshot" and "Steady Eddie", was an American professional baseball player. He played as an infielder in the Major League Baseball from 1936 to 1948, most notably as a member of the Detroit Tigers team that finished either in first or second place in the American League pennant races between 1944 and 1947 and won the 1945 World Series. Mayo was selected to his only All-Star team in 1945 and, was the runner-up in voting for the 1945 American League Most Valuable Player Award. He also played for the New York Giants, Boston Braves and the Philadelphia Athletics.

== Career overview ==
Mayo played in 834 games in the major leagues, initially as a third baseman (229 games) and for most of his career as a second baseman (544 games). In a nine-season career, the left-handed hitting Mayo posted a .252 batting average and .313 on-base percentage with 287 RBIs, 759 hits, 350 runs scored, 257 walks, 161 extra base hits, and 109 sacrifice hits. He was among the league leaders in sacrifice hits six times, including a major league leading 28 sacrifice hits in 1944.

Mayo was also a solid defensive infielder. In 1943, he led all American League third basemen in fielding percentage at .976. Two years later, after switching positions, he led all American league second basemen with a .980 fielding percentage at his new position. He also led the league's second basemen in 1944 with 125 double plays.

His best season was 1945 when he helped lead the Detroit Tigers to a World Series championship and was selected as the American League's Most Valuable Player by The Sporting News.

== Early years (1932–38) ==
May was born in Holyoke, Massachusetts, but grew up in Clifton, New Jersey. Born Edward Joseph Mayoski, Mayo was the son of Polish immigrants who changed their name to Mayo.

Mayo first signed with the Detroit Tigers at age 22 in 1932. He played in the minor leagues with Johnstown, Knoxville, and Baltimore. In May 1936, he was traded by Baltimore (International League) to the New York Giants. Mayo hit .199 in 46 games as a backup third baseman for the 1936 Giants. He also appeared in one game of the 1936 World Series against the Yankees.

In December 1936, Mayo was traded by the Giants to the Boston Bees. He played in 65 games for Boston in the 1937 season, principally as a backup third baseman, batting above .227.

In May 1938, the Chicago Cubs bought Mayo from Boston, but he never appeared in a game for the Cubs.

== The Pacific Coast League (1938–42) ==
Mayo spent the next five years with the Los Angeles Angels in the Pacific Coast League. In 1938, Los Angeles sportswriters chose him as the Angels' Most Valuable Player after he batted .332 and set a PCL record for playing 34 consecutive error-free games.

On July 13, 1941, Mayo (still playing for the Los Angeles Angels) was accused of spitting in the face of umpire Ray Snyder during an argument. League President W. C. Tuttle suspended Mayo for one year. Mayo protested that he never spat and‚ after a series of hearings with minor-league czar Judge Brabham‚ Mayo was reinstated on September 5, 1941, and finished the season with the Angels.

== Return to MLB (1943–44) ==
After leaving Boston in May 1938, Mayo did not play in another major league game for five years. In November 1942, with the major league player pool depleted by World War II military service, Mayo was drafted by the Philadelphia Athletics from the Cubs in the Rule 5 draft.

During spring training prior to the 1943 season, Mayo suffered an eye injury when he was hit by a thrown ball. Mayo and catcher Bob Swift had a man in a rundown between third base and home. Swift's throw caromed off the runner and hit Mayo directly in the left eye, causing a retinal hemorrhage. Mayo later said that the injury affected his sight, and he even had a blind spot, throughout the 1943 season.

Despite the injury, Mayo was the Athletics' starting third baseman in 1943, playing 123 games at the position. He led the league in fielding percentage, was awarded his first Gold Glove award, and led the league with 29 fielding runs. However, Mayo felt that the eye injury affected his hitting more than his fielding, and his .219 batting average and 28 RBIs were unimpressive. The A's lost 20 games in a row that year and finished in last place. The A's dropped him at the end of the season because of "poor eyesight."

After the 1943 season, Mayo was purchased by the Boston Red Sox, but he was drafted by the Detroit Tigers one month later in the rule 5 draft.

Perhaps because of the 1943 injury to his eye, Mayo developed a peculiar habit of ducking after every pitch.

In 1944, the Tigers moved Mayo from third base to second base. Prior to 1944, Mayo had never played in a single major game at second base, but he adjusted well. He had an excellent .978 fielding percentage for the Tigers in 1944 and led all American League second basemen with 120 double plays. Mayo also substantially improved his offensive performance in 1944, raising his average 30 points to .249 with 151 hits, 18 doubles, and 63 RBIs. Mayo finished 29th in the 1944 AL MVP voting.

== MVP runner-up (1945) ==
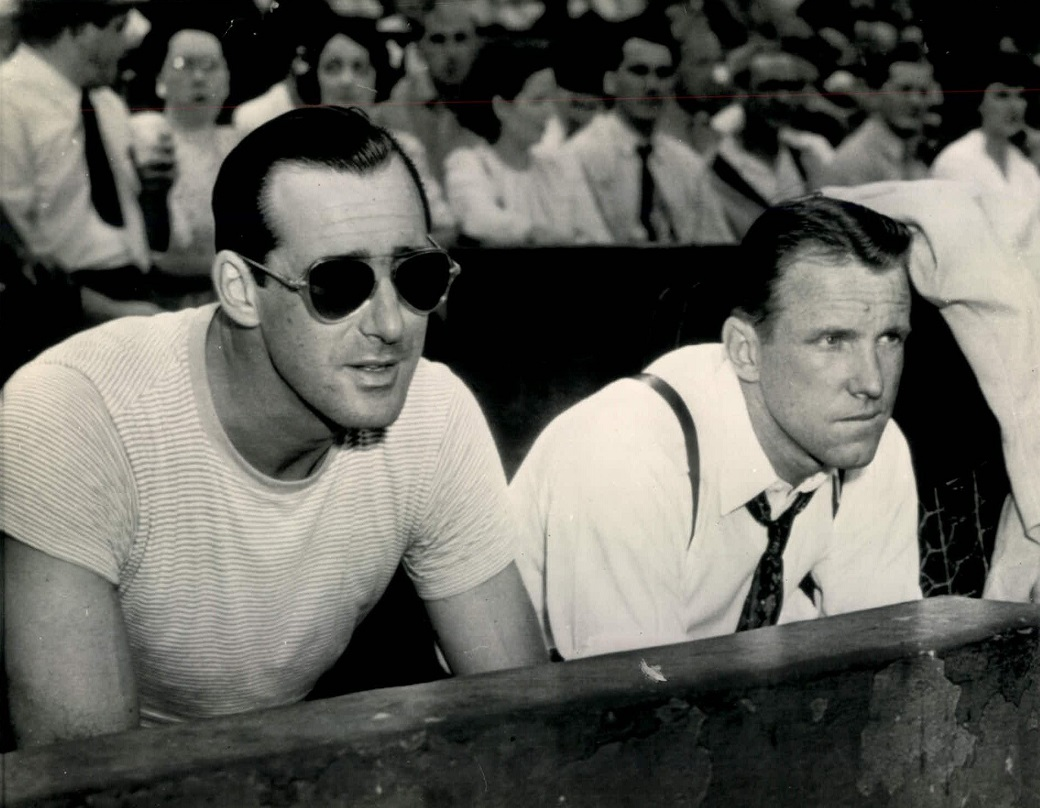
Hank Greenberg (left) and Eddie Mayo in September 1945.

Going into the 1945 season, writers were skeptical about the middle of the Tigers' infield. Second baseman Mayo and shortstop Skeeter Webb were both 35 years old, and both had been back-up or utility infielders before the depletion of talent in World War II. Yet, Mayo went on to be MLB's AL Most Valuable Player runner-up (he was selected by The Sporting News for their AL MVP award). In post-season voting, Tigers pitcher Hal Newhouser, won the official American League Most Valuable Player award with 9 first place votes, and Mayo finished second with 7 first place votes.

Prior to 1944, Mayo had never hit for a batting average higher than .227. In 1945, Mayo hit for a .285 average and .347 on base percentage—both career highs. He also had 24 doubles and a career-high 10 home runs. In addition to a better than average offensive year, Mayo led all American League second basemen with a .980 fielding percentage. The 35-year-old Mayo showed great range, as his range factor of 5.80 was 45 points higher than the league average.

Mayo's performance also won him an unofficial American League All Star team position in 1945, no MLB All-Star Game was held due to the ending of the war and seven exhibitions games were played for the war relief fund. Mayo helped lead the Tigers to the American League pennant. In fact, the man previously known as a good-field and no-hit infielder, had the highest batting average among Tigers players with at least 300 at bats. Newhouser called Mayo the "take-charge guy in our infield."

Mayo also contributed to the Tigers victory over the Cubs in the 1945 World Series. He started all seven games of the Series and had 7 hits, 4 runs, 3 walks, 2 RBIs, and a .323 on-base percentage.

In the decisive Game 7, Mayo went 2-for-5, scored two runs and had a double and 2 RBIs. He hit a fly ball to deep left field in the 6th inning narrowly missing a home run. Then, in the 8th inning, Mayo hit a double down the left-field line that scored Skeeter Webb. After advancing to third base, Mayo scored on a line drive to left field off the bat of Hank Greenberg. The runs that Mayo drove in and scored in Game 6 proved to the last World Series runs by the Detroit Tigers until 1968.

== Later years (1946–54) ==
In 1946, Mayo was limited to 51 games, as Jimmy Bloodworth returned from the war and became the Tigers' starting second baseman and George Kell stepped in at third base. However, Mayo continued to be a fine fielder. On May 8, 1946, against the Washington Senators, he caught a line drive off the bat of Gil Torres that deflected off Hal Newhouser and turned it into a triple play. It was the second one in which he'd been involved in two years, and Torres was the batter on both occasions.

In 1947, the popular Mayo won back his starting job at second base and had a strong year at the bat. He hit .279 with 149 hits and career-highs in doubles (28) and triples (4).

In 1948, Mayo played his final season, hitting for a .249 batting average, with 20 doubles and 42 RBIs.

In 1949, Mayo became manager of the Tigers' Toledo Mud Hens Triple-A farm team. After two years in Toledo, he followed Tigers' manager Steve O'Neill, who had become manager of the Boston Red Sox. Mayo served as the Sox' third base coach in 1951 under O'Neill. In 1952, O'Neill moved to the Philadelphia Phillies, and Mayo again followed, serving as the team's third base coach from 1952 to 1954. Hall of Famer and Red Sox general manager Joe Cronin called Mayo the best third base coach in the major leagues.

== Life after baseball ==
After retiring from baseball, Mayo owned several restaurants in northern New Jersey. He later retired to Southern California, where he became very active as a fundraiser for the Loma Linda Children's Hospital. Mayo died in 2006 at age 96 in Banning, California. He was the oldest living Detroit Tiger at the time of his death. He was also named the 81st best Tiger in franchise history.

Sporting positions
| Preceded by Steve O'Neill | Boston Red Sox third-base coach 1951 | Succeeded by Ski Melillo |
