= Stubby Overmire =

American baseball player (1919–1977)

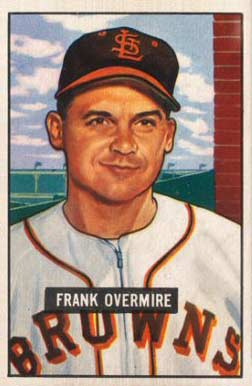
- Pitcher
- Born: May 16, 1919; Moline, Michigan, U.S.
- Died: March 3, 1977 (aged 57); Lakeland, Florida, U.S.
- Batted: Right Threw: Left

MLB debut
- April 25, 1943, for the Detroit Tigers

Last MLB appearance
- August 3, 1952, for the St. Louis Browns

MLB statistics
- Win–loss record: 58–67
- Earned run average: 3.96
- Strikeouts: 301
- Stats at Baseball Reference

Teams
- Detroit Tigers (1943–1949); St. Louis Browns (1950–1951); New York Yankees (1951); St. Louis Browns (1952)

Career highlights and awards
- World Series champion (1945)

Frank W. Overmire (May 16, 1919 – March 3, 1977) was an American Major League Baseball pitcher who played ten seasons for the Detroit Tigers (1943–1949), St. Louis Browns (1950–1952), and New York Yankees (1951). In ten seasons, Overmire won 58 games and lost 67 with a 3.96 earned run average. Because of his stature, 5 feet 7 inches (1.70 m) and 170 pounds (77 kg), the left-hander was nicknamed "Stubby."

Born in Moline, Michigan, Overmire attended Western State Teachers College, now known as Western Michigan University, where he played for the then Hilltoppers from 1938 to 1941.

Overmire signed with the Detroit Tigers after in 1941 as an undrafted free agent. He debuted for the Tigers in April 1943 and won 7 games with 8 complete games and 3 shutouts in his rookie season. In his second season, Overmire pitched 11 complete games, 3 shoutouts, and had his career-low ERA at 3.07.

In 1945, Overmire started 22 games, and won 9, for the American League pennant winning Tigers. He was the Tigers' starting pitcher in Game 3 of the 1945 World Series against the Chicago Cubs, Despite giving up only 2 runs in 6 innings, Overmire took the loss as the Tigers were shut out 3–0.

Overmire's best season was 1947, when he won 11 and lost 5 for the Tigers with a 3.77 earned run average. His 3 shutouts and won-loss percentage of .688 were both fifth best in the American League.

Overmire went on to pitch for the St. Louis Browns from 1950 to 1952 with a short stint with the New York Yankees at the end of the 1951 season. Stubby pitched in 15 games for the Yankees in 1951 and won his second World Series ring, as the Yankees beat the Giants in the 1951 World Series.

After his playing career ended, Overmire became a manager in the Tigers' minor league organization. Through the 1950s, he served as a manager in Little Rock, Terre Haute, Montgomery, Valdosta, and Decatur. In 1959 as manager of the Decatur Commodores of the Midwest League, Overmire was named Manager of the Year. He moved on to Durham in 1960 and Jamestown in 1962. From 1963 to 1966, he was a coach in the Major Leagues for the Tigers. In 1967, he managed Lakeland, and in 1970, he returned as the manager for Montgomery. He finished his career as a manager in Lakeland, Florida, where he served as manager from 1971 to 1975.

Overmire died on March 3, 1977, after suffering a stroke.

Sporting positions
Preceded by Tom Ferrick	Detroit Tigers pitching coach 1963–1966	Succeeded by Johnny Sain
