= Al Benton =

American baseball player (1911–1968)

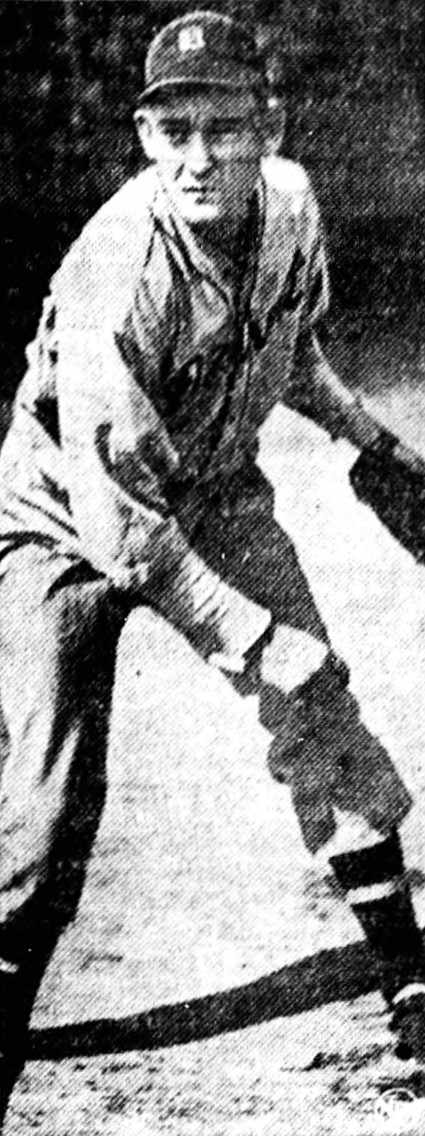
- Benton, circa 1940
- Pitcher
- Born: March 18, 1911; Noble, Oklahoma, U.S.
- Died: April 14, 1968 (aged 57); Lynwood, California, U.S.
- Batted: Right Threw: Right

MLB debut
- April 18, 1934, for the Philadelphia Athletics

Last MLB appearance
- September 21, 1952, for the Boston Red Sox

MLB statistics
- Win–loss record: 98–88
- Earned run average: 3.66
- Strikeouts: 697
- Saves: 66
- Stats at Baseball Reference

Teams
- Philadelphia Athletics (1934–1935); Detroit Tigers (1938–1942, 1945–1948); Cleveland Indians (1949–1950); Boston Red Sox (1952)

Career highlights and awards
- 2× All-Star (1941, 1942); World Series champion (1945)

John Alton Benton (March 18, 1911 – April 14, 1968) was an American professional baseball pitcher. He played in Major League Baseball (MLB) for the Philadelphia Athletics, Detroit Tigers, Cleveland Indians, and Boston Red Sox. The right-hander was listed as 6 feet 4 inches (1.93 m) tall and 215 pounds (98 kg).

Benton is known for being the only pitcher to face both Babe Ruth (in 1934) and Mickey Mantle (in 1952). Benton is also the only player to have two sacrifice bunts in the same inning, against the Cleveland Indians on August 6, 1941.

== Biography ==
Benton was born in Noble, Oklahoma, a small town a few miles south of Norman. In 1940, Benton led the American League with 17 saves. In 1941 he went 15–6 with a 2.97 earned run average (ERA) (second in the American League (AL)) in 38 games. He completed seven of 14 starts and got seven saves. Despite his 7–13 mark a year later, his ERA was 2.90 with career-highs in starts (30) and innings pitched (226 2/3). Benton was chosen for the AL All-Star team in both 1941 and 1942, and then missed the 1943 and 1944 seasons while serving in the U.S. Navy during World War II.

Benton was discharged from the Navy in November 1944 and had his best year in 1945. After his first six starts, he had an ERA of 0.33, tied for the best in major league history to that point. For the season, he compiled a record of 13–8, a career-low 2.02 ERA, five shutouts, and 12 complete games in 191 2/3 innings. In a remarkable testament to the Tigers pitching in 1945, Hal Newhouser and Benton were No. 1 and No. 2 in ERA among AL pitchers. Newhouser's Adjusted ERA+ in 1945 was 195 and Benton's was 175. The Adjusted ERA+ figures posted by Newhouser and Benton in 1945 rank as the first and fifth best seasons all time for a Detroit Tigers pitcher with at least 150 innings pitched. Benton pitched in relief in three games in the 1945 World Series and gave up only one earned run for a 1.93 World Series ERA.

The rest of his career he worked largely as a setup man or as an emergency starter. A two-time All-Star (1941–42), Benton compiled a career 98–88 record with 697 strikeouts and a 3.66 ERA in 1688 1/3 innings.

Benton died in 1968 at the age of 57 from burns he suffered when the Lynwood, California, motel he managed exploded into flames.

== See also ==
- Best pitching seasons by a Detroit Tiger
- List of Major League Baseball annual saves leaders
