= Doc Cramer =

American baseball player (1905–1990)

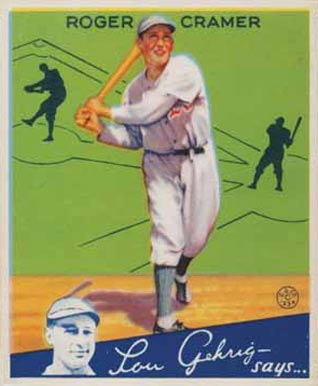
- Center fielder
- Born: July 22, 1905; Beach Haven, New Jersey, U.S.
- Died: September 9, 1990 (aged 85); Manahawkin, New Jersey, U.S.
- Batted: Left Threw: Right

MLB debut
- September 18, 1929, for the Philadelphia Athletics

Last MLB appearance
- May 12, 1948, for the Detroit Tigers

MLB statistics
- Batting average: .296
- Hits: 2,705
- Home runs: 37
- Runs batted in: 842
- Stats at Baseball Reference

Teams
- Philadelphia Athletics (1929–1935); Boston Red Sox (1936–1940); Washington Senators (1941); Detroit Tigers (1942–1948)

Career highlights and awards
- 5× All-Star (1935, 1937–1940); World Series champion (1945)

Roger Maxwell "Doc" Cramer (July 22, 1905 – September 9, 1990) was an American center fielder and left-handed batter in Major League Baseball who played for four American League teams from 1929 to 1948.

== Career ==
A mainstay at the top of his team's lineup for many years, Cramer led the American League in at bats a record seven times and in singles five times. He hit over .300 eight times, primarily with the Philadelphia Athletics and Boston Red Sox, and retired among the league's career leaders in hits (10th, 2,705), games played (10th, 2239) and at bats (5th, 9140). One of the few major leaguers to play regularly in center field after turning 40, he also ended his career among the major leagues' all-time leaders in games in center field (3rd, 2031) and outfield putouts (4th, 5412), and ranked seventh in AL history in total games in the outfield (2142). Along with Willie Keeler and Adrián Beltré, he is one of the few players to collect 750 hits with three different major league teams.

Born in Beach Haven, New Jersey, Cramer was nicknamed "Flit", which was the name of a popular insecticide, by sportswriter Jimmy Isaminger for his great ability to judge fly balls; in other words, he was death to flies. Indeed, he led AL outfielders in putouts in 1936 and 1938.

After starting his career in semipro ball in New Jersey in 1928, he was signed by the Philadelphia Athletics and hit .404 to win the Blue Ridge League batting championship in 1929. He played with the Athletics' powerful championship teams of 1929–1931, breaking in gradually, though in the postseason for the A's he appeared only twice, as a pinch-hitter, in the 1931 World Series. After he hit .336 in 92 games in 1932, his place on the team was secure. On June 20, 1932, he tied a major league record by going 6-for-6 in a nine-inning game (and on July 13, 1935, became the only AL player to do it twice). He scored 100 runs in a season for the first time in 1933, and hit for the cycle on June 10, 1934. In 1934, Cramer set a team record among left-handed hitters with 202 hits and topped it in 1935 with 214 – still the Athletics franchise record for a left-handed batter; he finished eighth in the 1935 MVP voting. But the fortunes of the A's declined just as Cramer was becoming a solid everyday player as the star players on the financially struggling team were sent on to other teams. Al Simmons and Jimmy Dykes were sold to the Chicago White Sox on the same day in September 1932, and Lefty Grove and Mickey Cochrane were traded away after the 1933 season. Jimmie Foxx was traded to the Red Sox in December 1935, and Cramer joined him a month later.

Batting leadoff, Cramer was a spray singles hitter, sometimes stretching them into doubles—although he was a not much of a base-stealer. He hit over .300 every year from 1937 to 1940 with Boston, scoring 100 runs in 1938 and 1939, and tied for the league lead in hits (200) in 1940. He was traded to the Washington Senators on December 12 of that year and was sent to the Detroit Tigers exactly one year later after hitting .273. He was on the All-Star team five times (1935, 1937–40).

Two years after hitting over .300 for the last time with the 1943 Tigers, Cramer played 140 games in center field at age 40 in 1945 (albeit during World War II, when many regular players were in military service), and finally enjoyed significant play in the Fall Classic that year, leading the Tigers in the 1945 World Series with a .379 batting average, scoring seven runs and knocking in four, to help them win the Series 4–3 over the Chicago Cubs. He scored two runs and had one RBI in both Games 5 and 7. In his final seasons he was often used as a pinch-hitter, and he led the league with nine pinch-hits in 1947 before ending his career with two pinch-hit appearances in 1948, going 0-for-2 in that role and 0-for-4 overall in four games. Cramer played in the World Series fourteen years apart in 1931 and 1945. In Game 7 of the 1931 Series, Cramer was sent in to pinch-hit with the bases loaded and two out as the Athletics trailed 4–0. He hit a flyball to short center that drove in two runs in a game that was subsequently ended on the next batter as the Athletics lost 4–2.

In the 1945 Series, Cramer was the starting center fielder for all seven games. In Game 2, Cramer scored the first run of the game for Detroit on his ground ball single to tie the game for his second of three hits. In the fourth inning of Game 4, he helped to set up a four-run inning for Detroit by hitting a single to give them two baserunners with one out before Hank Greenberg hit a groundball single to start the scoring onslaught. In Game 5, Cramer scored the first run of the game in the third inning with a sacrifice fly. He also collected a hit and a hit-by-pitch and scored two runs. Even in Game 6, where the Tigers lost in extras, Cramer had two hits and delivered an RBI to help the Tigers force a 7–7 tie in the 8th inning. In Game 7, Cramer played his part in a busy first inning for Detroit. With the first two runners already on base due to singles, Cramer hit a short fly ball to left for a single to score the first run of what would be five in the inning. Cramer went 3-of-5 with an RBI and two runs scored as the Tigers won 9–3.

He was not known as a power-hitter and liked to tell people about the time he was walked so the opposing pitcher could pitch to Hank Greenberg. On September 30, 1945, in St. Louis, the Tigers had men on second and third in the 9th, down 3–2. Cramer was walked to load the bases and set up a force play, but Greenberg followed with a grand slam that won the pennant for the Tigers. Interviewed by Donald Honig in the 1970s, Cramer told of how he would tease Greenberg: "So anywhere I go and Hank is there, I always say, 'You know, once they walked me to get to Hank Greenberg' — and never tell 'em what happened, and then Hank always jumps up and says, 'Hey, tell 'em what happened.' But I never do; I just leave it at that."

In his 20-season career, Cramer batted .296 with 2,705 hits, 1357 runs, 37 home runs, 842 RBI, 396 doubles, 109 triples, 62 stolen bases and a .340 on-base percentage in 2239 games. Defensively, he compiled a career .979 fielding percentage. By team, he batted .308 for the Athletics, .302 for the Red Sox, .282 for the Tigers and .273 for the Senators. He rarely struck out, leading the AL four times in at strikeouts-per-at-bats and finishing in the top four five other seasons. His 2,031 games in center field placed him behind only Tris Speaker (2690) and Ty Cobb (2194) in major league history. Owing to a late start, Cramer had most of his hits past the age of 30, with his seasons from 1936 to 1945 seeing him have 1,786 combined hits, which ranked as second for all players playing baseball in seasons fully in their thirties. His 2,705 hits (23rd in MLB history when he retired) are the most of any player retired before 1975 who has not been elected to the Baseball Hall of Fame. No player had more hits than Cramer had during his playing years (Mel Ott ranked second with 2,667), and he was sixth in hits for all players who played in the second quarter of the 20th century (1925–1950); he is the only one of the top fourteen to not be in the Hall of Fame. Cramer compiled two 6-hit games and five 5-hit games in his MLB career. Despite his career counting stats, Cramer compiled just 13.3 career wins above replacement (WAR) according to Baseball Reference, largely due to his below average on-base plus slugging and defense.

== Post career ==
As White Sox batting coach from 1951 to 1953, he tutored the young second baseman Nellie Fox, who often credited Cramer with making him a major league hitter.

Cramer had worked as a carpenter before entering the major leagues, and continued to work as a carpenter during the off-seasons of his playing career. After leaving baseball, he resumed working full time as a carpenter and home builder.

== Personal life and death ==
He died in the Manahawkin section of Stafford Township, New Jersey, at 85 years of age, where a street, Doc Cramer Boulevard, is named in his honor. A youth baseball tournament, the Doc Cramer Invitational Baseball Tournament, used to be held in Manahawkin every July.

== See also ==
- 1945 Detroit Tigers season
- List of Major League Baseball career hits leaders
- List of Major League Baseball career triples leaders
- List of Major League Baseball career runs scored leaders
- List of Major League Baseball players to hit for the cycle
- List of Major League Baseball single-game hits leaders

Achievements
Preceded by Babe Herman	Hitting for the cycle June 10, 1934	Succeeded by Lou Gehrig
