= Bob Swift =

American baseball player and manager (1915–1966)

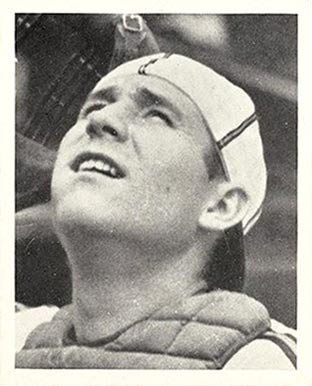
- Catcher / Manager
- Born: March 6, 1915; Salina, Kansas, U.S.
- Died: October 17, 1966 (aged 51); Detroit, Michigan, U.S.
- Batted: Right Threw: Right

MLB debut
- April 16, 1940, for the St. Louis Browns

Last MLB appearance
- September 27, 1953, for the Detroit Tigers

MLB statistics
- Batting average: .231
- Home runs: 14
- Runs batted in: 238
- Managerial record: 56–43
- Winning %: .566
- Stats at Baseball Reference

Teams
- As player: St. Louis Browns (1940–1942); Philadelphia Athletics (1942–1943); Detroit Tigers (1944–1953); As manager: Detroit Tigers (1965, 1966)

Career highlights and awards
- World Series champion (1945)

Robert Virgil Swift (March 6, 1915 – October 17, 1966) was an American professional baseball player, coach, manager and scout. He played in Major League Baseball as a catcher, standing 5 feet 11 inches (1.80 m) tall and weighing 180 pounds (82 kg). He threw and batted right-handed.

Swift is pictured in one of the most famous photographs in American sporting history. He was the catcher for the Detroit Tigers on August 19, 1951, when St. Louis Browns owner Bill Veeck sent midget Eddie Gaedel to pinch hit during an actual MLB game. The stunt occurred in the second game of a doubleheader at Sportsman's Park, inspired by the James Thurber short story You Could Look It Up. Gaedel was allowed to bat when the Browns showed the umpires a legitimate baseball contract issued by the American League office. Swift knelt on the ground to receive pitcher Bob Cain's offerings—it is this kneeling stance that is captured in the photo—and Gaedel took a base on balls. He was immediately replaced at first base by a pinch runner and he never appeared in a big league game again.

== Playing career ==
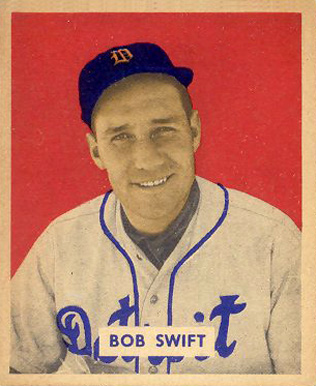
Swift's 1949 baseball card

While Gaedel was a novice, Swift, a native of Salina, Kansas, played 14 consecutive seasons (1940–53) in the big leagues and all or parts of 22 years in professional baseball (1934–53; 1955–56).

During his big-league career, he toiled for the Browns (1940–42), Philadelphia Athletics (1942–43) and Tigers (1944–53), appearing in 1,001 games and hitting .231. His 635 hits included 86 doubles, three triples and 14 home runs. Defensively, he recorded a .985 fielding percentage. Swift was primarily a second-string catcher, although he started 83 of the 1945 world champion Tigers' official American League games. During the seven-game 1945 World Series, however, he started only in Game 3, with Paul Richards handling that assignment in the remaining six contests.

== Coaching and managing career ==
Swift became a coach and minor league manager upon the end of his MLB playing career, coaching for the Tigers (1953–54; 1963–66), Kansas City Athletics (1957–59), and Washington Senators (1960). During the 1959 season, Swift filled in for Kansas City manager Harry Craft when Craft missed 15 games due to illness, and the Athletics won ten straight games and went 13–2. But Swift was bypassed at season's end when the A's changed managers.

Swift was in his second stint as a Detroit coach in 1965 when manager Chuck Dressen was felled by a mild heart attack during spring training. As acting manager, Swift led Detroit to a 24–18 record until Dressen was able to return to duty on May 31.

The next season, on May 16, 1966, Dressen suffered his second coronary in as many seasons. Again, Swift took the reins, but in mid-July (with the Tigers 32–25 under his command) he fell ill and was hospitalized during the All-Star game break for what appeared to be food poisoning. Tests revealed, however, that Swift was suffering from inoperable lung cancer. Coach Frank Skaff took over July 14 as the team's second acting manager and finished the campaign.

Three months after stepping aside, on October 17, Bob Swift died in Detroit at the age of 51. (Dressen had predeceased him, on August 10.) His record in 1965–66 as an interim manager was 56–43 (.566), giving him a career record of 69–45 (.605).

Sporting positions
Preceded by Boom-Boom Beck	Washington Senators pitching coach 1960	Succeeded by Eddie Lopat (Minnesota Twins)
Preceded by Johnny Vander Meer	Syracuse Chiefs manager 1963	Succeeded by Frank Carswell
Preceded by George Myatt	Detroit Tigers third base coach 1963–1966	Succeeded by Frank Skaff
