= Roy Cullenbine =

American baseball player (1913–1991)

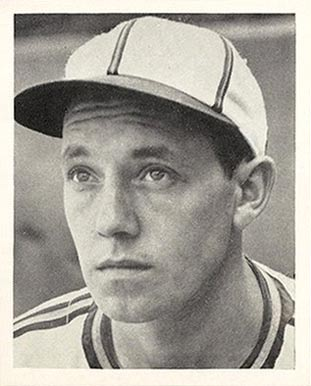
- Outfielder
- Born: October 18, 1913; Nashville, Tennessee, U.S.
- Died: May 28, 1991 (aged 77); Mount Clemens, Michigan, U.S.
- Batted: Switch Threw: Right

MLB debut
- April 19, 1938, for the Detroit Tigers

Last MLB appearance
- September 28, 1947, for the Detroit Tigers

MLB statistics
- Batting average: .276
- Home runs: 110
- Runs batted in: 599
- Stats at Baseball Reference

Teams
- Detroit Tigers (1938–1939); Brooklyn Dodgers (1940); St. Louis Browns (1940–1942); Washington Senators (1942); New York Yankees (1942); Cleveland Indians (1943–1945); Detroit Tigers (1945–1947)

Career highlights and awards
- 2× All-Star (1941, 1944); World Series champion (1945)

Roy Joseph Cullenbine (October 18, 1913 – May 28, 1991) was an American professional baseball outfielder and first baseman. He played ten seasons in Major League Baseball (MLB) for the Detroit Tigers, Brooklyn Dodgers, St. Louis Browns, Washington Senators, New York Yankees, and Cleveland Indians between 1938 and 1947.

Cullenbine was among the American League leaders in walks for seven consecutive seasons from 1941 to 1947, and holds the major league record for most consecutive games (22) with a walk.

== Career ==
Born in Nashville, Tennessee but raised in Detroit, Michigan, Cullenbine was a switch-hitter and one of the most prolific recipients of bases on balls in major league history. In his ten-year career, he collected almost as many walks (853) as he did hits (1,072). He was among the American League leaders in walks for seven consecutive seasons from 1941 to 1947. He was once walked four times in the same game by Yankee ace Lefty Gomez, in August 1941. Roy Cullenbine In a July 1941 game, he scored 5 runs in only 2 official at bats.

Driven largely by his ability to draw walks, he had a career on-base percentage of .408, 132 points higher than his career batting average of .276. This on-base percentage ranks 38th best in major league history, higher than many Hall of Fame legends, including Honus Wagner, Joe DiMaggio, Willie Mays and Hank Aaron.

=== Early years ===
He played football for Detroit's Eastern High School, and was a Tiger batboy in 1930. In 1932, legendary scout Wish Egan saw him working out on Navin Field and signed him. His minor league career ran from 1932 to 1937, for Shreveport, Louisiana; Greenwood, Mississippi; Springfield, Illinois; Beaumont, Texas; and Toledo, Ohio.

After starting his major league career in 1938-39 for his hometown Detroit Tigers, he was among several major league players declared free agents in January 1940 by Commissioner Kenesaw Mountain Landis and was given a $25,000 bonus to sign with the Brooklyn Dodgers the following month.

After playing only 22 games for the Dodgers, he was traded in May 1940 to the St. Louis Browns for Joe Gallagher.

=== Breakout season in 1941 ===
He had a strong 1941 season for the Browns, hitting .317 with 121 walks for a .452 on-base percentage, 2nd only to Ted Williams in the AL. Cullenbine also drove in 98 runs, made the All-Star team (in Detroit, ending with a two-out ninth-inning come-from-behind walk-off three-run blast by Williams off Claude Passeau) and finished 10th in AL Most Valuable Player voting.

=== 1942: Four teams and a World Series ===
After that career year with the Browns, he was bounced around to three different teams in 1942. He started the season with the Browns, but was traded to the Washington Senators on June 1. The New York Yankees then claimed him off waivers on August 31, 1942. This was a stroke of luck for Cullenbine, sending him to the 1942 World Series with a .300 on-base percentage and three runs scored for the Yanks, who were upset 4-1 by the overachieving St. Louis Cardinals. He was then traded on December 17, 1942, to the Cleveland Indians, his fourth team that calendar year.

=== 1943 and 1944: An All-Star for the Cleveland Indians ===
He played for the Indians throughout 1943–44, putting up solid numbers both years: .289 & .284, with on-base percentages of .407 & .380. He made the All-Star team for a second time in 1944.

=== 1945: A World Series Championship with the Tigers ===
Shortly after the start of the 1945 season, the Indians traded him back to his hometown Detroit Tigers where he had started his major league career. As was the case in 1942, he was fortunate enough to be traded in 1945 to a team that went on to win the American League pennant.

In 1945, Cullenbine put up his best numbers in many offensive categories (with many stars still in World War II service). He led the American League with 113 walks, and was 2nd with a .402 on-base percentage. He also hit for power with 18 home runs (2nd), 93 runs batted ins (2nd), 51 extra base hits (4th) and a .444 slugging percentage (3rd). After leading the Tigers to the pennant, he helped the Tigers win the World Series over the Chicago Cubs. Despite hitting only .227 in the Series, he drew eight walks for a .433 on-base percentage and scored five runs.

=== 1946 and 1947: Solid offensive production for Detroit ===
Cullenbine continued his solid offense for the Tigers in 1946 & 1947, with career-high .335 batting average and .477 on-base percentage in 1946. In 1947, he hit a career-high 24 home runs and set a Tiger record with 137 walks, while his .407 on-base percentage was third best in the American League. From July 2–22, 1947, he drew walks in 22 consecutive games, breaking Ted Williams' 19 in 1941 (as the last .400 hitter at .406), a record still standing at the end of the 2019 season. But with only 104 hits, his batting average dropped to .224 in 1947, and the Tigers released him after the season.

=== Retirement ===
Seeking to rebound from his release, he was picked up briefly by the Philadelphia Phillies only to be released again just three weeks into the 1948 season on April 19 without getting into a game.

=== Career statistics ===
In 1,181 games played, Cullenbine batted .276 (1072 hits in 3879 at bats) with 627 runs scored, 209 doubles, 32 triples, 110 home runs, 599 runs batted in, an on-base percentage of .408 and a slugging percentage of .432 over 10 seasons. He finished his career with a .977 fielding percentage. In 12 World Series games, he hit .244 (10-41) with 8 runs and 6 runs batted in.

== Death ==
Cullenbine died of heart disease at 77 in 1991 at Mount Clemens Hospital in Mount Clemens, Michigan, and was buried at the Christian Memorial Cultural Center Cemetery in Rochester Hills, Michigan.

== See also ==
- List of Detroit Tigers team records
- List of Major League Baseball career on-base percentage leaders
- List of Major League Baseball individual streaks
