= Skeeter Webb =

American baseball player (1909–1986)

- Infielder
- Born: November 4, 1909; Meridian, Mississippi, U.S.
- Died: July 8, 1986 (aged 76); Meridian, Mississippi, U.S.
- Batted: Right Threw: Right

MLB debut
- July 20, 1932, for the St. Louis Cardinals

Last MLB appearance
- August 31, 1948, for the Philadelphia Athletics

MLB statistics
- Batting average: .219
- Home runs: 3
- Runs batted in: 166
- Stats at Baseball Reference

Teams
- St. Louis Cardinals (1932); Cleveland Indians (1938–1939); Chicago White Sox (1940–1944); Detroit Tigers (1945–1947); Philadelphia Athletics (1948)

Career highlights and awards
- World Series champion (1945)

James Laverne "Skeeter" Webb (November 4, 1909 – July 8, 1986) was an American professional baseball infielder in Major League Baseball from 1932 to 1949. He played 12 seasons with the St. Louis Cardinals, Cleveland Indians, Chicago White Sox, Detroit Tigers, and Philadelphia Athletics.

== Early years ==
Skeeter Webb was born in Meridian, Mississippi, in 1909. He attended the University of Mississippi, where he joined Sigma Nu.

== Professional baseball career ==
=== St. Louis Cardinals ===
He began his major-league career on July 20, 1932, with the St. Louis Cardinals at the age of 23. He appeared in only one game in 1932, and did not have a plate appearance.

=== Minor leagues ===
Webb did not make another major-league club for six years. From 1932 to 1937, Webb played for six minor-league clubs, including the Springfield Senators (1932–1933), Cedar Rapids Raiders (1935–1936), and Columbus Red Birds (1932 and 1937). He compiled a career-high .320 batting average in 472 at bats with Cedar Rapids in 1935.

=== Cleveland Indians ===
In April 1938, he signed as a free agent with the Cleveland Indians. In 1939, he played in 81 games at shortstop for the Indians and had a .264 batting average, the highest of his major-league career. He also appeared in 39 games with the Buffalo Bisons of the International League in 1939.

=== Chicago White Sox ===
Traded to the Chicago White Sox in January 1940, he was moved to second base, where he played 74 games. His batting average dropped to .237 in 1940, and he was relegated to the role of a utility infielder and back-up second baseman in 1942 and 1943. However, with the major-league talent pool depleted, Webb won the job as the Sox' starting shortstop in 1944. However, he hit only .211 in 513 at bats for the 1944 White Sox.

=== Detroit Tigers ===
Traded to the Detroit Tigers at the end of the 1944 season, Webb was the Tigers' starting shortstop in their 1945 World Series championship season. Skeeter played 104 games at shortstop for the 1945 Tigers, but proved to be a liability at bat. His batting average dropped to .199 in 1945, as Webb got only 81 hits in 407 at bats.

Despite his weak hitting performance in the regular season, Webb played all seven games of the 1945 World Series as the Tigers' shortstop. He hit .185 in the World Series, going 5-for-27, though he did score five runs. In game 7, Webb had his best performance, scoring two runs and fielding the final out of the series. After the Series, one sports writer singled out Webb for the following praise:

"During the regular season, Webb was not a standout performer with the Tigers. He was a fair fielder but a weak hitter. No one who has followed the Tigers closely this year would have been surprised if Webb had buckled under the strain of World Series competition. However, instead of buckling, Webb played better than any infielder on either club. He made a number of dazzling plays and not a single error. In addition, he hit the ball harder and with more effectiveness than he ever did during the American League campaign."

In 1946 and 1947, Webb stayed with the Tigers as a backup second baseman.

=== Philadelphia Athletics ===
He finished his major league career playing in 23 games for the Philadelphia Athletics in 1948, where he hit a career-low .148. He played in his final game on August 31, 1948.

=== Toronto Maple Leafs ===
During the 1949 season, Webb played for the Toronto Maple Leafs in the International League. He appeared in 49 games for Toronto.

=== Career totals ===
In 12 major league seasons, Webb played in 699 games - 368 at shortstop, 282 at second base, and seven at third base. Webb had a career .219 batting average, a .263 on-base percentage, and a .368 slugging percentage.

== Later years ==
After retiring from baseball, Webb returned to Mississippi. He was married to the former Olive O'Neill, whose father, Steve, was the manager of the Tigers from 1943 to 1948. The Webbs had two sons (John and James Jr.) and two daughters (Carol Ann and Pam). Skeeter Webb died in Meridian, Mississippi, in 1986.
