= 1940 Detroit Tigers season =

Major League Baseball season

1940 Detroit Tigers
- American League Champion
- League: American League
- Ballpark: Briggs Stadium
- City: Detroit
- Record: 90–64 (.584)
- League place: 1st
- Owners: Walter Briggs, Sr.
- General managers: Jack Zeller
- Managers: Del Baker
- Radio: WWJ (AM) (Ty Tyson); WXYZ (Harry Heilmann)

The 1940 Detroit Tigers season was their 40th since they entered the American League in 1901. The team won the American League pennant with a record of 90–64, finishing just one game ahead of the Cleveland Indians and just two games ahead of the New York Yankees. It was the sixth American League pennant for the Tigers. The team went on to lose the 1940 World Series to the Cincinnati Reds 4 games to 3.

== Offseason ==
- December 9, 1939: Wally Moses was traded by the Tigers to the Philadelphia Athletics for Benny McCoy. The trade was voided on January 14, 1940.
- January 14: Baseball commissioner Judge Landis ruled that 91 players on the Tigers roster or in the Detroit farm system were free agents, due to misconduct by the team in restricting its minor league players. The players awarded free agency included Roy Cullenbine‚ Benny McCoy‚ Lloyd Dietz‚ and Steve Rachunok from the team's major league roster. Landis also ordered the team to pay compensation of $47‚250 to 14 players. The minor league players awarded free agency included Johnny Sain.
- February 15: The Tiger released a roster showing Hank Greenberg as an outfielder. Greenberg's move to the outfield made room for Rudy York to take over at first base.

== Regular season ==
The 1940 Tigers were led by: Hank Greenberg, who won his second American League MVP award; Rudy York, who was #2 in the AL behind Greenberg in RBIs, total bases and extra base hits; Barney McCosky, who led the major leagues in hits and triples; and Bobo Newsom, who led the major leagues in Adjusted ERA+ and was #2 in the AL behind Bob Feller in ERA, wins, and winning percentage.

=== Season summary ===
The 1940 Tigers won the American League pennant with a record of 90–64. They narrowly beat the Cleveland Indians led by Bob Feller in a tight pennant race that went back-and-forth right down to the end of the season. The Tigers outscored their opponents 888 to 717 for the season.

=== The players ===
==== Catcher: Tebbetts and Sullivan ====
Catcher Birdie Tebbetts played for the Tigers from 1936 to 1947, missing the 1943–1945 seasons for military service. He was chosen four times for the AL All Star team. In 1940, Tebbetts hit .296 and led all AL catchers in assists (89), errors (17) and double plays (10).

Catching duties were shared with Billy Sullivan, Jr.. He hit .309 with a .399 on-base percentage and .450 slugging percentage for the 1940 Tigers. Sullivan played in 5 of 7 games of the 1940 World Series for the Tigers, scoring three runs with a .389 on-base percentage. His father, Billy Sullivan, was also a catcher for the Tigers in 1916.

==== Infield: York, Gehringer, Bartell, and Higgins ====
First baseman Rudy York started as a catcher in 1937. In 1940, the Tigers persuaded Hank Greenberg to move to left field, allowing York to take over at first base. The experiment was successful, as York finished 2nd in the AL in RBIs (134), total bases (343), and extra base hits (85). He also finished 8th in the AL MVP voting, 3rd in the major leagues in times on base (279) and doubles (46) and 4th in the AL in slugging percentage (.583). York was among the American League leaders in home runs for 11 consecutive seasons from 1937 to 1947, and his .503 slugging percentage as a Tiger ranks #4 in franchise history.

Charlie Gehringer, known as "The Mechanical Man" for his quiet consistency, was the Tigers' second baseman from 1924 to 1942. In 1940, the 37-year-old Gehringer hit .313, scored 108 runs, and was 4th in the major leagues in on-base percentage (.428) and 3rd in AL in bases on balls (101).

Shortstop Dick Bartell was known as one of the most ferocious competitors of his era. In 1940, he hit only .233 for the Tigers, but he had 76 walks boosting his on-base percentage by 100 points to .335. He scored 76 runs and drove in 53 runs for the 1940 season. Bartell finished 12th in the AL MVP voting in 1940.

Third baseman Pinky Higgins was the team's starting third baseman from 1939 to 1944. In 1940, he hit .271, drove in 76 runs, hit 13 home runs, and walked 61 times, boosting his on-base percentage to .357.

==== Outfield: Greenberg, McCosky, Fox, Campbell, and Averill ====
Left fielder "Hammerin' Hank" Greenberg was the team's and the league's MVP. He was awarded the AL Most Valuable Player award for the second time in his career, the first person to win the MVP award at two different positions (1935 at first base, 1940 at left field). In 1940, Greenberg led the major leagues in RBIs (150), extra base hits (99), slugging percentage (.670), OPS (1.103), total bases (384), doubles (50), and runs created (166). He also led the AL in home runs (41) and at bats per home run (14.0). He was 4th in AL in batting average (.340) and 2nd in the major leagues in on-base percentage (.433), runs scored (134), and times on base (289). Greenberg was drafted into the military in early 1941 (one of the first major league players to be drafted) and lost parts of five seasons (1941–1945) to military service.

Center fielder Barney McCosky also had a tremendous year. For the 1940 season, McCosky led the major leagues in hits (200) and triples (19). He was also 3rd in the major leagues in runs scored (123), and 4th in the AL in times on base (268), 5th in the AL in batting (.340). In the World Series, he hit .304 (7-for-23) with five runs. McCosky finished 16th in the 1940 AL MVP voting. Since 1940, the only Tiger to exceed McCosky's 19 triples is Curtis Granderson in 2007.

Right fielder Pete Fox played 82 games in right field, hitting .289 with a .403 slugging percentage.

Bruce Campbell was traded to the Tigers in January 1940. Campbell played 74 games in right field for the Tigers, sharing the position with Pete Fox. During the regular season, Campbell hit .283 with a .381 on-base percentage and .448 slugging percentage. Campbell played all 7 games of the 1940 World Series and hit .360 with a slugging percentage of .520 in the Series, with a home run and five RBIs.

Hall of Famer Earl Averill was acquired by the Tigers in 1938 and was a backup outfielder for the 1940 team. Averill retired in 1941.

==== Pitching: Newsom, Bridges, Rowe, Gorsica, Newhouser, and Trout ====
Bobo Newsom finished 4th in the AL MVP voting in 1940 and was the ace of the Tigers' pitching staff. After losing on Opening Day, Bobo won 13 straight games during the regular season before injuring his thumb. He finished the season as the major league leader in Adjusted ERA+ (167), second in the major leagues in strikeouts (164), and second in the AL in ERA (2.83), wins (21), and winning percentage (.808). Newsom gave a historic effort in the 1940 World Series, pitching three complete games with a 1.38 ERA. After watching his son win Game 1, Bobo's father died in a Cincinnati hotel. Bobo promised to win Game 5 for his father and shut out the Reds, 5–0. Newsom started Game 7 on only one day's rest, and held the Reds to 2 runs, but the Tigers scored only once. The Reds won the game and the World Series, but Newsom's performance was one of the greatest efforts in World Series history.

Schoolboy Rowe finished 7th in the AL MVP voting in 1940 and was the AL leader in winning percentage (.842) with a 16–3 record. He started two games in the 1940 World Series. He lasted a combined 3-2/3 innings in his two starts and lost both games with an ERA of 17.18.

Tommy Bridges was fourth in the AL in both strikeouts (133) and Adjusted ERA+ (140). He was also second in the major leagues in strikeouts per 9 innings pitched (6.06). He started one game of the 1940 World Series, pitching a complete game for the win.

Closer Al Benton led the major leagues in saves (17) and was second in the major leagues in games finished (35).

Hal Newhouser was the youngest player in AL in 1940 at age 19. The future two-time AL MVP started 20 games for the 1940 Tigers and had a record of 9–9.

Rookie Floyd Giebell was one of the most interesting stories of the 1940 season. Giebell made his major league debut in September 1940 as a 30-year-old rookie. Giebel pitched a pair of complete game victories and gave up only two runs in 18 innings for an earned run average of 1.00. On September 27, 1940, the Tigers needed one more win to clinch the pennant. With Bob Feller scheduled to pitch for the Indians, Detroit manager Del Baker decided to start Giebell rather than "waste" his aces Bobo Newsom or Schoolboy Rowe. Time magazine described Giebell at the time as "a gawky stringbean" — Geiebell was 6 ft 2 1/2 in (189 cm) and 172 pounds (78 kg) —who "looked like a sacrificial lamb as he ambled out to the mound." But, as Time reported after the game, Giebell was "no lamb" that day. Instead, "[w]ith cunning change of pace and the control of an oldtimer, the green-as-grass rookie shut out the Indians 2-to-0." Feller gave up only 3 hits for the day, but one of them was a 2-run wind-blown home run by Rudy York. Giebell shut out the Indians for 9 innings in one of the great "David vs. Goliath" moments in baseball history.

=== Season chronology ===
- April 16: On Opening Day in Detroit, the Tigers draw the largest crowd, 49,417, in the major leagues. The Tigers lose to the St. Louis Browns, 5–1, as Detroit castoff Slick Coffman won over Bobo Newsom.
- April 25: The Tigers beat the St. Louis Browns, 4–2, for their fourth consecutive win. Bobo Newsom got the win for Detroit. Elden Auker, who helped the Tigers win the 1935 World Series, was the losing pitcher from the Browns.
- April 29: At Detroit‚ Bob Feller walked in the winning run in the 8th inning and lost to the Tigers‚ 4–3. Cotton Pippen was the winner with 8-1/3 innings of relief.
- May 20: Pinky Higgins hit three consecutive home runs and drove in seven runs to lead Detroit to a 10–7 victory over the first place Red Sox. Jimmie Foxx hit his 10th home run of the year‚ a 5th inning grand slam.
- May 21: Jimmie Foxx hit a grand-slam for the second day in a row against Detroit in an 11–8 Red Sox win. Hank Greenberg and Rudy York homered for Detroit, while Wally Moses had a pair of triples and 2 singles.
- June 13: The Indians beat the Tigers‚ 3–2‚ in 11 innings‚ winning on Charlie Gehringer's throwing error. Cleveland had their best month of the year‚ settling into first place‚ which they will hold until the final two weeks of the season.
- June 14: The Indians beat the Tigers, 8–0, as Johnny Allen held the Tigers to two hits.
- June 23: Bobo Newsom won his 9th straight game for the Tigers, holding the Yankees to four hits. The Tigers moved to a game and a half behind the first place Indians.
- June 27: Bobo Newsom (10–1) won his 10th in a row after losing on Opening Day, as the 2nd place Tigers beat St. Louis, 2–1. Detroit had only three hits, but two of them were home runs by Hank Greenberg and Charlie Gehringer.
- July 1: Bobo Newsom notched his 11th victory in a row‚ 3–1‚ over the Chicago White Sox.
- July 2: Detroit took over 1st place as the Indians lost to the Browns and the Tigers beat the White Sox‚ 10–9‚ taking advantage of 10 walks.
- July 4: The Tigers drew the largest crowd in their history‚ 56‚272‚ for the first-place showdown with the Indians. Detroit took the opener‚ 5–3‚ behind Tommy Bridges' complete game. The Indians bounced back to win the second game in 11 innings‚ 2–1‚ to regain first place.
- July 6: The Tigers swept a pair from the Browns and moved within 2 percentage points of the Indians. In an 11–2 win‚ Bobo Newsom allowed three hits in winning his 12th straight complete game win. Johnny Gorsica got the win for the Tigers in the second game.
- July 7: The Tigers beat the St. Louis Browns, 5–2, to move into a tie for first place.
- July 13: In the second game of a doubleheader, Bobo Newsom won 13th straight game. Bobo allowed two hits in shutting out Washington‚ 4–0‚ in the nightcap of 2. The Tigers also won the opener and moved within a point of 1st place.
- July 17: Going for his 14th straight win‚ Bobo Newsom broke his right thumb in the 4th inning against Boston. Newsom was covering first and injured his thumb taking a throw from Rudy York. Newsom left with a 3–2 lead, and Al Benton took the loss, 8–3, in relief of Newsom in the first game of a double header. Detroit also lost the second game‚ 8–5‚ and dropped into a 2nd place tie with the Red Sox. The doctor predicted Newsom would be out four weeks but Bobo says 10 days.
- July 18: A triple play and three walks in the final inning helped the Tigers top the Red Sox‚ 10–8‚ and return to first place.
- July 31: Detroit beat the Yankees, 7–6, in 11 innings to remains in a tie for first place with Cleveland. Pinky Higgins hit a bases-loaded triple in the 8th inning to make it 5–4, but the Yankees tied it. The Tigers won it in the 11th‚ with two walks by Lefty Gomez a game-winning single by Hank Greenberg.
- August 1, 1940: Red Kress was released by the Tigers.
- August 2: In Detroit‚ the Red Sox beat the Tigers‚ 12–9. Shortstop Joe Cronin hit for the cycle for the second time in his career. Cronin's 8th inning homer‚ off Archie McKain won it for the Sox.
- August 5: St. Louis Browns pitcher John Whitehead pitched a 6-inning rain-shortened no-hitter against the Tigers‚ winning 4–0. The game was Whitehead's only win in 1940, as an ankle injury sidelined him. Detroit won the first game of the double header‚ 9–2.
- August 12: Cleveland and Detroit‚ deadlocked for first place (64–44)‚ met in a pitching duel between Bob Feller and Hal Newhouser. Cleveland won‚ 8–5‚ as Feller became the majors' first 20-game winner.
- August 13: The Indians moved two games in front by beating the Tigers again‚ 6–5.
- August 24: The Tigers beat the Red Sox, 12–1, at Fenway Park. Ted Williams pitched the last two innings, allowing 3 hits and one run scored when third baseman Charlie Gelbert juggled a double play grounder. Williams struck out Tiger slugger Rudy York‚ who had driven in 5 Detroit runs, on three pitches
- September 3: Detroit‚ in third place behind the Indians and Yankees‚ beat the Indians and Bob Feller, 7–2, at Briggs Stadium. Charlie Gehringer‚ Hank Greenberg and Bruce Campbell all hit home runs. Schoolboy Rowe got the win.
- September 4: In Detroit‚ the Tigers beat the Indians again, 11–2. Bruce Campbell and Charlie Gehringer both hit three-run home runs. Tommy Bridges and Al Benton combined for the win.
- September 6: Bobo Newsom won his 18th game as the Tigers handed Cleveland its 5th straight loss‚ 10–5. The Indians lead was reduced to one game.
- September 7: The Tigers beat the Browns 5–4‚ scoring three runs in the 9th inning to win. Hank Greenberg hits his 29th home run of the year. With the Indians losing their 6th straight game, the Tigers trailed by only .011 percentage points.
- September 9: The Indians lost their 7th straight, and the Tigers took over first place with the Yankees one game back.
- September 10: The Tigers lost to the Red Sox, 6–5 in 13 innings, and Cleveland moves back into first by .001 percentage points. Lefty Grove got the win over Bobo Newsom.
- September 11: The Tigers beat the Red Sox, 11–7, to briefly take over first place. But the Yankees and Indians split a double-header in Cleveland. The day ended with three teams (Yankees, Indians, and Tigers) tied for first place.
- September 12: The Tigers beat the Yankees, 6–3, in Detroit. Hank Greenberg hit his 32nd home run.
- September 13: Tommy Bridges shut out the Yankees‚ 8–0‚ for his 16th victory and Detroit's 8th win in 9 games. Hank Greenberg hits his 33rd home run of the year.
- September 14: The Yankees beat the Tigers, 16–7, exploding on Bobo Newsom. Joe DiMaggio had two doubles among his four hits as he took over the AL batting lead from Rip Radcliff. The Tigers led the AL by a half game as Red Sox rookie Earl Johnson stopped the Indians‚ 2–1.
- September 15: The Tigers lost, 6–1, to Washington knuckleballer Dutch Leonard. The Indians swept a double header from the A's‚ 5–0 and 8–5. Bob Feller pitched a one-hitter with no walks in the opener.
- September 17: The Tigers beat Washington, 6–3, to regain first place. Schoolboy Rowe (15–3) got the win, and Rudy York hit his 29th home run.
- September 18: The Tigers split a double header with the A's (14–0, 6–13), and Bob Feller won his 26th game as Cleveland swept the Senators, to push the Indians a half game ahead of the Tigers.
- September 19: The Tigers swept the A's‚ 13–2 and 10–1. Floyd Giebell‚ 30‚ just up from Buffalo where he went 15–16‚ won the opener and Dizzy Trout won the second game. The Indians also won and with 8 games left‚ the Tigers and Indians are tied with equal records of 85–61.
- September 20: The Tigers beat the Indians, 6–5, in Detroit. The Tigers score five runs off Bob Feller, who was pitching in relief. The Tigers failed to hit a home run for the first time in 18 games.
- September 21: With the Tigers‚ Indians‚ and Yankees in a tight pennant race‚ the Tigers beat the Indians, 5–0, behind the solid pitching of Schoolboy Rowe. Rowe got his 16th win, and the Tigers extended their lead to two games.
- September 22: The Indians beat the Tigers, 10–5, in front of 56,771 fans in Detroit. Bob Feller got the win. Hank Greenberg hit his 40th home run, but the Indians had home runs by Feller, Hal Trosky‚ Roy Weatherly‚ Ben Chapman‚ and Ken Keltner. Detroit's lead was reduced to one game.
- September 24: Former Tiger Elden Auker led the Red Sox over the Indians.
- September 25: In Detroit‚ Bobo Newsom won both games of a double header against the White Sox. Detroit won the opener, 10–9, as Newsom pitched 2 innings of relief for his 20th win. Rudy York had the game-winning double in the 10th inning. Newsom pitched a complete game in the nightcap, a 3–2 win. Hank Greenberg hit his 41st home run and collected his 150th RBI. Detroit led by 2 games.
- September 27: In one of the most famous games in Tigers history, the Tigers needed one win to clinch the pennant. Bob Feller was set to start for the Indians at Cleveland. Detroit manager Del Baker chose to start rookie Floyd Giebell against Feller. Giebell went the distance and beat Feller and the Indians, 2–0. Feller gave up only three hits, but one of the hits was a wind-blown two-run home run by Rudy York. During the game‚ unruly Cleveland fans showered the field with fruit and vegetables delaying the game. Hank Greenberg was hit by a tomato while in the field. At one point‚ a basket of green tomatoes was dropped into the Detroit bullpen, landing on Birdie Tebbetts' head and knocking him out.
- October 26: Hank Greenberg was named the AL MVP with 292 points. Greenberg also won the MVP honors in 1935 as a first baseman. Bob Feller was second in the MVP voting with 222 points.

=== Season standings ===
American League
Team	W	L	Pct.	GB	Home	Road
Detroit Tigers	90	64	.584	—	50‍–‍29	40‍–‍35
Cleveland Indians	89	65	.578	1	51‍–‍30	38‍–‍35
New York Yankees	88	66	.571	2	52‍–‍24	36‍–‍42
Boston Red Sox	82	72	.532	8	45‍–‍34	37‍–‍38
Chicago White Sox	82	72	.532	8	41‍–‍36	41‍–‍36
St. Louis Browns	67	87	.435	23	37‍–‍39	30‍–‍48
Washington Senators	64	90	.416	26	36‍–‍41	28‍–‍49
Philadelphia Athletics	54	100	.351	36	29‍–‍42	25‍–‍58

=== Record vs. opponents ===
1940 American League record Sources:
Team	BOS	CWS	CLE	DET	NYY	PHA	SLB	WSH
Boston	—	11–11	8–14	11–11	9–13	18–4	12–10	13–9
Chicago	11–11	—	6–16	13–9	11–11–1	16–6	13–9	12–10
Cleveland	14–8	16–6	—	11–11	10–12	14–8	11–11–1	13–9
Detroit	11–11	9–13	11–11	—	14–8	11–11	18–4–1	16–6
New York	13–9	11–11–1	12–10	8–14	—	13–9	14–8	17–5
Philadelphia	4–18	6–16	8–14	11–11	9–13	—	8–14	8–14
St. Louis	10–12	9–13	11–11–1	4–18–1	8–14	14–8	—	11–11
Washington	9–13	10–12	9–13	6–16	5–17	14–8	11–11	—

=== Roster ===
1940 Detroit Tigers
Roster
Pitchers: 19 Al Benton; 10 Tommy Bridges; 22 Dick Conger; 22 Floyd Giebell; 26,34 Johnny Gorsica; 18 Fred Hutchinson; 28 Archie McKain; 25 Lynn Nelson; 16 Hal Newhouser; 12 Bobo Newsom; 17 Cotton Pippen; 14 Schoolboy Rowe; 24 Tom Seats; 29 Clay Smith; 11 Bud Thomas; 15 Dizzy Trout; -- Bob Uhl	Catchers: 8 Billy Sullivan; 1 Birdie Tebbetts; Infielders: 7 Dick Bartell; 3 Frank Croucher; 2 Charlie Gehringer; 6 Pinky Higgins; 26 Red Kress; 33 Scat Metha; 33 L. D. Meyer; 4 Rudy York	Outfielders: 27 Earl Averill; 20 Bruce Campbell; 9 Pete Fox; 5 Hank Greenberg; 21 Barney McCosky; 17 Pat Mullin; 23 Tuck Stainback; Other batters: -- Frank Secory	Manager: 32 Del Baker; Coaches: 26 Red Kress; 31 Bing Miller; 30 Merv Shea

== Player stats ==
= Indicates team leader

= Indicates league leader

=== Batting ===
==== Starters by position ====
Note: Pos = Position; G = Games played; AB = At bats; H = Hits; Avg. = Batting average; HR = Home runs; RBI = Runs batted in

Pos	Player	G	AB	H	Avg.	HR	RBI
C	Birdie Tebbetts	111	379	112	.296	4	46
1B	Rudy York	155	588	186	.316	33	134
2B	Charlie Gehringer	139	515	161	.313	10	81
3B	Pinky Higgins	131	480	130	.271	13	76
SS	Dick Bartell	139	528	123	.233	7	53
OF	Hank Greenberg	148	573	195	.340	41	150
OF	Barney McCosky	143	589	200	.340	4	57
OF	Pete Fox	93	350	101	.289	5	48

==== Other batters ====
Note: G = Games played; AB = At bats; H = Hits; Avg. = Batting average; HR = Home runs; RBI = Runs batted in

Player	G	AB	H	Avg.	HR	RBI
Bruce Campbell	103	297	84	.283	8	44
Billy Sullivan	78	220	68	.309	3	41
Earl Averill	64	118	33	.280	2	20
Red Kress	33	99	22	.222	1	11
Dutch Meyer	23	58	15	.259	0	6
Frank Croucher	37	57	6	.105	0	2
Tuck Stainback	15	40	9	.225	0	1
Scat Metha	26	37	9	.243	0	3
Pat Mullin	4	4	0	.000	0	0
Frank Secory	1	1	0	.000	0	0

Note: pitchers' batting statistics not included

=== Pitching ===
==== Starting pitchers ====
Note: G = Games pitched; IP = Innings pitched; W = Wins; L = Losses; ERA = Earned run average; SO = Strikeouts

Player	G	IP	W	L	ERA	SO
Bobo Newsom	36	264.0	21	5	2.83	164
Tommy Bridges	29	197.2	12	9	3.37	133
Schoolboy Rowe	27	169.0	16	3	3.46	61
Johnny Gorsica	29	160.0	7	7	4.33	68
Hal Newhouser	28	133.1	9	9	4.86	89
Cotton Pippen	4	21.1	1	2	6.75	9
Floyd Giebell	2	18.0	2	0	1.00	11

==== Other pitchers ====
Note: G = Games pitched; IP = Innings pitched; W = Wins; L = Losses; ERA = Earned run average; SO = Strikeouts

Player	G	IP	W	L	ERA	SO
Dizzy Trout	33	100.2	3	7	4.47	64
Fred Hutchinson	17	76.0	3	7	5.68	32
Lynn Nelson	6	14.0	1	1	10.93	7

==== Relief pitchers ====
Note: G = Games pitched; W = Wins; L= Losses; SV = Saves; GF = Games Finished; ERA = Earned run average; SO = Strikeouts

Player	G	W	L	SV	GF	ERA	SO
Al Benton	42	6	10	17	35	4.42	50
Archie McKain	27	5	0	3	17	2.82	24
Tom Seats	26	2	2	1	10	4.69	25
Clay Smith	14	1	1	0	5	5.08	14
Bud Thomas	3	0	1	0	2	9.00	0
Dick Conger	2	1	0	0	0	3.00	1
Bob Uhl	1	0	0	0	0	inf	0

== 1940 World Series ==
=== World Series summary ===
The 1940 World Series featured the Detroit Tigers and the Cincinnati Reds, with the Tigers losing in 7 games.

In Game 1, the Tigers beat the Reds, 7–2. It was the 10th straight World Series loss for a National League team. The Tigers scored five runs in the 2nd inning, and Bruce Campbell added a two-run home run. Bobo Newsom held the Reds to eight hits. Newsom's father, visiting from South Carolina, died in a Cincinnati hotel room the day after watching his son win Game 1.

In Game 2, Bucky Walters gave the NL its first World Series game victory, 5–3, since Carl Hubbell beat the Yankees in 1937. Jimmy Ripple hit a two-run home run in the 3rd inning, and Walters gave up only 3 hits.

In Game 3, the Tigers won, 7–3, before a crowd of almost 53,000 at Briggs Stadium. The Tigers had 9 hits and 19 total bases in the 7th and 8th innings off the Reds. Tommy Bridges pitched a complete game.

In Game 4, the Reds won, 5–2. Paul Derringer‚ who had lost 4 World Series starts going back to 1931‚ finally got a win. Detroit starter Dizzy Trout did not make it out of the third inning.

In Game 5, Bobo Newsom got the start for Detroit, just three days after his father's death. Bobo said he was going to pitch the game for his dad. In front of 55,000 fans in Detroit, he shut out the Reds, as the Tigers won 8–0, and took a 3–2 lead in the Series.

In Game 6, Bucky Walters got the win for the Reds with a 4–0 shutout.

The concluding game was a loss for the Tigers, as Bobo Newsom was called on to start on only one day's rest. Detroit got an unearned run in the 3rd inning to take a 1–0 lead. Newsom pitched well, allowing only two runs in the 7th inning. The Tigers scored only once, and the Reds won, 2–1.

Game	Score	Date	Location	Attendance	Winning Pitcher	Losing Pitcher
1	Tigers – 7, Reds – 2	October 2	Crosley Field	31,793	Bobo Newsom	Paul Derringer
2	Tigers – 3, Reds – 5	October 3	Crosley Field	30,640	Bucky Walters	Schoolboy Rowe
3	Reds – 4, Tigers – 7	October 4	Briggs Stadium	52,877	Tommy Bridges	Jim Turner
4	Reds – 5, Tigers – 2	October 5	Briggs Stadium	54,093	Paul Derringer	Dizzy Trout
5	Reds – 0, Tigers – 8	October 6	Briggs Stadium	55,189	Bobo Newsom	Junior Thompson
6	Tigers – 0, Reds – 4	October 7	Crosley Field	30,481	Bucky Walters	Schoolboy Rowe
7	Tigers – 1, Reds – 2	October 8	Crosley Field	26,854	Paul Derringer	Bobo Newsom

=== Postseason player stats ===
==== Batting ====
Note: G = Games played; AB = At bats; H = Hits; Avg. = Batting average; HR = Home runs; RBI = Runs batted in

Player	G	AB	H	Avg.	HR	RBI
Dick Bartell	7	26	7	.269	0	3
Bruce Campbell	7	25	9	.360	1	5
Charlie Gehringer	7	28	6	.214	0	1
Hank Greenberg	7	28	10	.357	1	6
Pinky Higgins	7	24	8	.333	1	6
Barney McCosky	7	23	7	.304	0	1
Billy Sullivan	5	13	2	.154	0	0
Birdie Tebbetts	4	11	0	.000	0	0
Rudy York	7	26	6	.231	1	2

==== Pitching ====
Note: G = Games pitched; IP = Innings pitched; W = Wins; L = Losses; ERA = Earned run average; SO = Strikeouts

Player	G	IP	W	L	ERA	SO
Bobo Newsom	3	26.0	2	1	1.38	17
Johnny Gorsica	2	11.1	0	0	0.79	4
Tommy Bridges	1	9.0	1	0	3.00	5
Clay Smith	1	4.0	0	0	2.25	1
Schoolboy Rowe	2	3.2	0	2	17.18	1
Archie McKain	1	3.0	0	0	3.00	0
Dizzy Trout	1	2.0	0	1	9.00	1
Fred Hutchinson	1	1.0	0	0	9.00	1

== Awards and honors ==
- Hank Greenberg: AL Most Valuable Player award

1940 Major League Baseball All-Star Game

- Tommy Bridges, Pitcher
- Hank Greenberg, Outfielder
- Bobo Newsom, Pitcher

=== League leaders ===
- Al Benton: MLB leader in saves (17)
- Hank Greenberg: AL leader in home runs (41)
- Hank Greenberg: MLB leader in RBIs (150)
- Hank Greenberg: MLB leader in extra base hits (99)
- Hank Greenberg: MLB leader in slugging percentage (.670)
- Hank Greenberg: MLB leader in OPS (1.103)
- Hank Greenberg: MLB leader in total bases (384)
- Hank Greenberg: MLB leader in doubles (50)
- Hank Greenberg: MLB leader in runs created (166)
- Hank Greenberg: AL leader in at bats per home run (14.0)
- Barney McCosky: MLB leader in hits (200)
- Barney McCosky: MLB leader in triples (19)
- Bobo Newsom: MLB leader in Adjusted ERA+ (167)
- Schoolboy Rowe: AL leader in winning percentage (.842)
- Birdie Tebbetts: AL leader in assists (89), errors (17) and double plays (10) by a catcher

=== Players ranking among top 100 all time at position ===
The following members of the 1934 Detroit Tigers are among the Top 100 of all time at their position, as ranked by The New Bill James Historical Baseball Abstract in 2001:

- Birdie Tebbetts: 64th best catcher of all time
- Hank Greenberg: 8th best first baseman of all time
- Rudy York: 56th best first baseman of all time
- Charlie Gehringer: 8th best second baseman of all time
- Dick Bartell: 37th best shortstop of all time
- Earl Averill: 14th best center fielder of all time (played 64 games for 1940 Tigers)
- Barney McCosky: 70th best center fielder of all time
- Pete Fox: 96th best right fielder of all time (played 93 games for 1940 Tigers)
- Bruce Campbell: 98th best right fielder of all time (played 103 games for 1940 Tigers)
- Tommy Bridges: 77th best pitcher of all time
- Hal Newhouser: 36th best pitcher of all time

== Farm system ==
Level	Team	League	Manager
A1	Beaumont Exporters	Texas League	Al Vincent
C	Hot Springs Bathers	Cotton States League	Cecil Coombs
C	Henderson Oilers	East Texas League	Jake Atz
C	Muskegon Reds	Michigan State League	Jack Tighe
D	Fulton Tigers	KITTY League	Jim Poole
