= Floyd Giebell =

American baseball player (1909–2004)

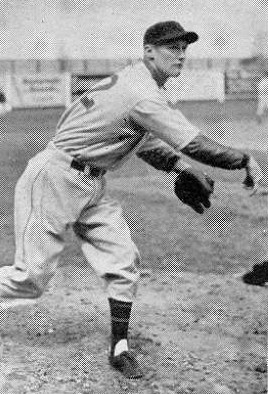
- Giebell in 1940
- Pitcher
- Born: December 10, 1909; Pennsboro, West Virginia, U.S.
- Died: April 28, 2004 (aged 94); Wilkesboro, North Carolina, U.S.
- Batted: Left Threw: Right

MLB debut
- April 21, 1939, for the Detroit Tigers

Last MLB appearance
- July 27, 1941, for the Detroit Tigers

MLB statistics
- Win–loss record: 3–1
- Earned run average: 3.99
- Strikeouts: 30
- Stats at Baseball Reference

Teams
- Detroit Tigers (1939–1941)

Floyd George Giebell (Note: Giebell's draft registration card of November 1940, which he signed, lists his middle name as "Karl".) (December 10, 1909 – April 28, 2004) was an American baseball player who is best remembered as the pitcher who, in his third career start, shut out Bob Feller and the Cleveland Indians to clinch the 1940 American League pennant for the Detroit Tigers of Major League Baseball (MLB). Listed at 6 feet 2 inches (1.88 m) and 172 pounds (78 kg), Giebell threw right-handed and batted left-handed.

== Early career ==
Born in Pennsboro, West Virginia, Giebell attended Salem International University. His first professional baseball team was the minor league Evansville Bees in 1938. Giebell played briefly for the major league Detroit Tigers in 1939, but he only pitched 15 1/3 innings in relief before being sent to the minor league Toledo Mud Hens, where he pitched most of the 1939 season.

== The 1940 season ==
In September 1940, Giebell was brought back up to the major leagues and had two outstanding starts during the 1940 pennant drive. Giebel pitched a pair of complete game victories and gave up only two runs in 18 innings pitched for an earned run average of 1.00.

Giebell got his first start on September 19, 1940, with Tigers and Indians tied for first place. Giebell, who had just been called up from the Buffalo Bisons where he went 15–16, pitched a complete game, giving up only two runs as the Tigers beat the Philadelphia Athletics, 13–2.

=== Pennant-clinching shutout over Bob Feller ===
On September 27, 1940, the Tigers needed one more win to clinch the pennant. With 27 game winner Bob Feller scheduled to pitch for the Indians, Detroit manager Del Baker decided to start Giebell against Feller rather than "waste" his aces Bobo Newsom or Schoolboy Rowe. Time magazine described Giebell at the time as "a gawky stringbean", who "looked like a sacrificial lamb as he ambled out to the mound." But, as Time reported after the game, Giebell was "no lamb" that day. Instead, "[w]ith cunning change of pace and the control of an oldtimer, the green-as-grass rookie shut out the Indians 2-to-0." Feller gave up only three hits for the day, but one of them was a two-run wind-blown home run by Rudy York. That was all the Tigers needed thanks to Giebell's pitching that day.

The setting in Cleveland that day was raucous. The Indians had built a reputation as the "Cleveland Crybabies" for their whining about manager Ossie Vitt, and had been subjected to chants of "Cleveland Crybabies", "Boohoo Indians" and "papeese" (plural of papoose) when they played in Detroit. Tiger fans threw baby bottles on the field during the game, decorated the dugout with diapers, and pushed a baby carriage along the dugout roof during the game. The Indians fans turned out in force, 45,000 strong, and armed "with eggs, eggplants, cauliflowers, fruit." As soon as the Tigers went on the field they were pelted from the stands. By the time Rudy York hit one of Feller's pitches for a two-run home run, Time reported that the field "looked like a vegetable plate."

The umpire called time twice, and Indians manager Ossie Vitt begged the fans to stop. When the umpire made an announcement threatening a forfeit, an immediate fruit barrage ensued. Hank Greenberg was drilled with a tomato as he ran after a fly ball. At one point, an entire bushel basket of tomatoes dropped from the upper grandstand into the Tiger bullpen, barely missing Tigers ace Schoolboy Rowe, but making a direct hit on Detroit catcher Birdie Tebbetts, knocking Tebbetts unconscious." The Cleveland police quickly apprehended the offender, Armen Guerra, and took him to the Detroit clubhouse. Tebbetts, now conscious, beat up Guerra while the cops looked the other way. Guerra, who earlier had dropped the crate on Tebbets, filed criminal assault charges, but Tebbets was acquitted.

Giebell remained calm through the commotion in Cleveland, and shutout the Indians for nine innings in one of the great "David vs. Goliath" moments in baseball.

== Career and life after 1940 ==
The pennant-clinching win over Feller was only the third of Giebell's career, but it proved to be his last. Having played in only three games, he was not eligible to play in the 1940 World Series. Giebell pitched briefly for the Tigers in 1941 but his ERA soared from 1.00 to 6.03. Giebell was sent back to the minor leagues. He pitched for Buffalo in 1941 and 1942 and then served in the military for three years during World War II. He returned to baseball following the war, but never made it out of the minor leagues. His final season playing professional baseball was 1948, with the minor league Dallas Eagles.

Over his three-year major league career, Giebell was 3–1 in 28 games (four as a starter) with a 3.99 earned run average in 67 2/3 innings.

According to his obituary, Giebell worked in the quality control labs of Weirton Steel until his retirement. He died in 2004 at age 94 in Wilkesboro, North Carolina. According to published accounts, Giebell still had a silver tray that had been signed by all the Detroit players to commemorate the pennant-clinching victory.
