= Clay Smith (baseball) =

American baseball player (1914–2002)

- Pitcher
- Born: September 11, 1914; Cambridge, Kansas, U.S.
- Died: March 5, 2002 (aged 87); Winfield, Kansas, U.S.
- Batted: Right Threw: Right

MLB] debut
- September 13, 1938, for the Cleveland Indians

Last MLB appearance
- September 22, 1940, for the Detroit Tigers

MLB statistics
- Win–loss record: 1–1
- Earned run average: 5.94
- Strikeouts: 17
- Stats at Baseball Reference

Teams
- Cleveland Indians (1938); Detroit Tigers (1940)

Clay Jamieson Smith (September 11, 1914 – March 5, 2002) was an American professional baseball pitcher who appeared in 18 games in Major League Baseball over two seasons for the Cleveland Indians (four games in 1938) and Detroit Tigers (14 contests in 1940). A member of the Kansas Baseball Hall of Fame, he hurled in one game of the 1940 World Series for the Tigers. During his playing career, he batted and threw right-handed, stood 6 feet 2 inches (1.88 m) tall, and weighed 190 pounds (86 kg).

Smith was born in Cambridge, in Cowley County, Kansas. He is one of three major leaguers (through 2022) out of Southwestern College of Winfield, Kansas, also in Cowley County. He was on the baseball, basketball, wrestling and track teams in college, and is a member of the college's basketball hall of fame.

== Baseball career ==
He began pitching in the minors for the Fargo–Moorhead Twins of the Class D Northern League in 1935 and 1936, posting a 15–5 won–lost record in the latter year. After going 16–13 in 1937 for Springfield Cardinals, in the Middle Atlantic League, he was promoted in 1938 to Wilkes–Barre of the Class A Eastern League, where he went 8–14 with an earned run average of 3.35.

Smith was recalled to Cleveland late in the season and made his major league debut on September 13, 1938, throwing two innings of relief against the eventual 1938 world champion New York Yankees.

Smith spent 1939 with the Buffalo Bisons of the top-tier International League, where he led the team in victories (13). A teammate was the 21-year-old Lou Boudreau, a future Baseball Hall of Fame shortstop, who hit .331. The Detroit Tigers then purchased Smith's contract and sent him to the Beaumont Exporters of the Texas League for 1940. Over the first 21/2 months of the season, Smith compiled a 12–5 record and a sparkling 2.31 earned run average in 23 games pitched, earning him a mid-year callup. In his first Detroit appearance, on July 13, 1940, at Griffith Stadium, he hurled 22/3 scoreless innings in relief of Tommy Bridges against the Washington Senators for his first (and only) MLB win as Detroit rallied from a 3–1 deficit to nip Washington, 4–3.

=== World Series appearance ===
Each win was precious for the 1940 Tigers, as they battled Smith's old Cleveland club to the wire in a thrilling American League pennant race. Smith's 14 total games for Detroit included one start, an 8–5 defeat on July 17 against the Boston Red Sox at Fenway Park, and 13 relief appearances. By season's end, he had posted a mediocre 5.08 earned run average, five games finished, and no saves, as the Tigers edged the Indians by one game to win the AL title. Smith was on the Tigers' roster for the 1940 World Series against the National League champion Cincinnati Reds. Detroit led the Series, two games to one, going into Game 4 on October 5, 1940, at Briggs Stadium. But starter Dizzy Trout was ineffective: he surrendered three runs on six hits, and left the game in the third frame with runners on second and third base and none out. Called upon to stanch the bleeding by manager Del Baker, Smith retired Jimmie Wilson, Eddie Joost and Paul Derringer to keep the score 3–0, Cincinnati. He went on to pitch a total of four full innings, allowing only one hit and one run, before he exited the game for a pinch hitter in the sixth inning with the Tigers trailing, 4–2. The Reds would win the contest, 5–2, to tie the Series, and eventually triumph in Game 7 to capture the world championship.

The World Series outing was Smith's last major-league appearance. In his 18 total regular season games, he split two decisions with nine games finished, no saves, and an earned run average of 5.49; in 391/3 innings pitched, he allowed 50 hits, 15 bases on balls, and 24 earned runs, with 17 strikeouts. But, in his stellar Fall Classic appearance against the Reds, Smith posted a 2.25 ERA, allowing three walks but only one hit and one earned run.

Smith returned to the minors in 1941, pitching for the St. Paul Saints through 1943. After baseball, he was a rancher and mail carrier, and worked a farm north of Cambridge until he was 71 years old. He died in Winfield in 2002, aged 87.
