= Johnny Gorsica =

American baseball player (1915–1998)

- Pitcher
- Born: March 29, 1915; Bayonne, New Jersey, U.S.
- Died: December 16, 1998 (aged 83); Charlottesville, Virginia, U.S.
- Batted: Right Threw: Right

MLB debut
- April 22, 1940, for the Detroit Tigers

Last MLB appearance
- September 17, 1947, for the Detroit Tigers

MLB statistics
- Win–loss record: 31–39
- Earned run average: 4.18
- Innings pitched: 723 2/3
- Stats at Baseball Reference

Teams
- Detroit Tigers (1940–1944; 1946–1947)

John Joseph Perry Gorsica, born Gorczyca (March 29, 1915 – December 16, 1998), was an American professional baseball player, a right-handed pitcher who worked in 204 Major League games over seven seasons (1940–1944; 1946–1947) for the Detroit Tigers. He stood 6 feet 2 inches (1.88 m) tall and weighed 180 pounds (82 kg).

Born in Bayonne, New Jersey, Gorsica went to West Virginia University before signing his first professional contract and making his debut as a first baseman with a West Virginia-based minor league team, the Class D Beckley Bengals, in 1937. He converted to pitcher the following year and broke into the Major Leagues with the 1940 Tigers on April 22 at age 25. The 1940 Tigers won the American League pennant, finishing ahead of the Cleveland Indians in a race that went to the season's last game. As a rookie, Gorsica split 14 decisions. He appeared in 29 games pitched, 20 as a starter, and threw five complete games with two shutouts. He excelled in the 1940 World Series against the Cincinnati Reds, allowing only one run for a 0.79 earned run average in 11 1/3 innings pitched, and striking out four. He pitched 4 1/3 innings in Game 2 and 6 1/3 innings in Game 6, both times coming in to relieve starter Schoolboy Rowe. Cincinnati won the Series, however, in seven games.

Relying on an overhand sinkerball, Gorscia both started and relieved during his Major League career, making 64 career starts. He was among the league leaders in saves (as yet an unofficial statistic) three straight years from 1942 to 1944, and collected 17 saves during his MLB tenure. Gorsica served in the United States Navy during World War II and missed the 1945 baseball season, when the Tigers won the world championship.

All told, he allowed 778 hits and 247 bases on balls in 723 2/3 MLB innings pitched, with 272 strikeouts.

He died in 1998 in a hospital in Charlottesville, Virginia.
