= Archie McKain =

American baseball player (1911–1985)

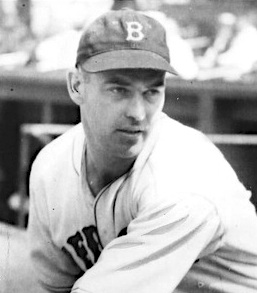
- McKain, circa 1938
- Pitcher
- Born: May 12, 1911; Delphos, Kansas, U.S.
- Died: May 21, 1985 (aged 74); Salina, Kansas, U.S.
- Batted: Both Threw: Left

MLB debut
- April 25, 1937, for the Boston Red Sox

Last MLB appearance
- July 5, 1943, for the St. Louis Browns

MLB statistics
- Win–loss record: 26–21
- Earned run average: 4.26
- Strikeouts: 188
- Stats at Baseball Reference

Teams
- Boston Red Sox (1937–1938); Detroit Tigers (1939–1941); St. Louis Browns (1941, 1943)

Archie Richard McKain (May 12, 1911 – May 21, 1985) was an American left-handed Major League Baseball pitcher with the Boston Red Sox, Detroit Tigers and the St. Louis Browns between 1937 and 1943.

== Early life ==
McKain was born in Delphos, Kansas, in 1911.

== Career ==
McKain began playing professional baseball in 1930 with the Pueblo Braves in the Western League. In his second season, he compiled an 18–12 record for the Braves with a 3.86 earned run average (ERA). McKain advanced to AA baseball with the Louisville Colonels of the American Association. His performance declined in 1931 as he compiled a 9–19 record. McKain remained with Louisville until 1935 when he joined the Minneapolis Millers.

McKain made his major league debut with the Red Sox in 1937. In two seasons with Boston, he compiled a 13–12 record and a 4.60 ERA.

McKain was traded to the Tigers with Pinky Higgins on December 15, 1938, in exchange for Elden Auker, Chet Morgan and Jake Wade. He spent two-and-one-half seasons with the Tigers, compiling a 12–7 record and 3.74 ERA. McKain had his best season in 1940, compiling a 5–0 record with a 2.82 ERA (adjusted ERA+ of 168) as the Tigers won the American League pennant. He appeared in game four of the 1940 World Series.

In August 1941, the Tigers sold McKain to the St. Louis Browns. He appeared in 18 games for the Browns in 1941 and 1943. When the Browns traded McKain to Brooklyn in July 1943, he retired from baseball.

== Personal life ==
After his baseball career, McKain lived in Minneapolis, Kansas, where he worked as a farmer and carpenter. He died in 1985 at Asbury Hospital at age 74 in Salina, Kansas.
