= Scat Metha =

American baseball player (1913–1975)

Frank "Scat" Metha
- Second base / Third base
- Born: December 13, 1913; Los Angeles, California, U.S.
- Died: March 2, 1975 (aged 61); Fountain Valley, California, U.S.
- Batted: Right Threw: Right

MLB debut
- April 22, 1940, for the Detroit Tigers

Last MLB appearance
- August 10, 1940, for the Detroit Tigers

MLB statistics
- Batting average: .243
- Home runs: 0
- Runs batted in: 3
- Stats at Baseball Reference

Teams
- Detroit Tigers (1940)

Frank Joseph "Scat" Metha (December 13, 1913 – March 2, 1975) was an American professional baseball player from 1935 to 1942. He played one season of Major League Baseball with the Detroit Tigers in 1940. He led organized baseball with 66 stolen bases in 1939 while playing for the Fort Worth Cats in the Texas League. He was given the nickname "Scat" due to his base-running and his "ability to hustle from bag to bag."

== Early years ==
Metha was born in Los Angeles, California, in 1913.

== Baseball career ==
=== Jacksonville ===
Metha began his professional baseball career in 1935 as the starting second baseman for the Jacksonville Jax in the West Dixie League. He continued to play for Jacksonville during the 1936 season. The Jax won the West Dixie League pennant in both of Metha's years with the club, and Metha appeared in 262 games for the team. During the 1936 season, Metha compiled a .313 batting average and hit 26 doubles, 12 triples, and 15 home runs in 511 at bats.

=== Columbus ===
During the 1937 season, Metha played for the Columbus Red Birds in the South Atlantic League. He compiled a .270 batting average with 23 doubles, 11 triples, and 12 home runs in 138 at bats for the Red Birds.

=== Fort Worth ===
Metha spent the 1938 and 1939 seasons playing for the Fort Worth Cats of the Texas League. He played at second base in 1938 but was moved to third base for the 1939 season. He stole 66 bases for Fort Worth in 1939, the highest total in organized baseball that season. His 1939 stolen base total was also the most seen in the Texas League in 30 years. The Sporting News wrote the Metha's play in 1939 was "brilliant" and helped lead Fort Worth to the Dixie Series. Metha's base-running drew particular praise, as he scored from second base on a sacrifice and advanced two bases on an infield outs during the Texas League playoffs. The Sporting News noted: "Many old-timers about the league call the young Californian the best base-runner they've ever seen. Even [Firpo] Marberry, who has seen [Ty] Cobb, [Kiki] Cuyler, [Max] Carey, and others at their best calls Metha 'one of the greatest.'" Metha earned the nickname "Scat" "[f]rom his ability to hustle from bag to bag."

=== Detroit ===
Metha was acquired by the Chicago White Sox in September 1939. He attended spring training with the White Sox in 1940 and was tried out as a third baseman, but did not make the team.

In April 1940, the Detroit Tigers purchased Metha from the White Sox for the waiver price of $7,500. The Tigers reportedly acquired Metha "as an insurance agent against injury or declining skill of Pinky Higgins, Dick Bartell or Charlie Gehringer." Metha appeared in 26 games for the 1940 Tigers, splitting his time between second and third base while compiling a .243 batting average.

=== Return to the minors ===
On August 12, 1940, the Tigers optioned Metha to the Beaumont Exporters in the Texas League. He appeared in 26 games for Beaumont at the end of the 1940 season.

In December 1940, the Tigers sold Metha to the Knoxville Smokies. He appeared in 89 games for the Smokies in 1941, compiling a .229 batting average. Metha returned to Fort Worth in 1942 where he concluded his career as a professional baseball player.

== Later years ==
Metha died in 1975 in Fountain Valley, California, at age 61. He was buried at Rose Hill Memorial Park in Whittier, California.
