= Tom Seats =

American baseball player (1910–1992)

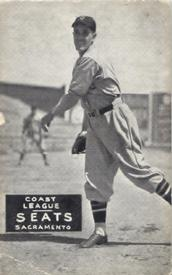
- Pitcher
- Born: September 24, 1910; Farmington, North Carolina, U.S.
- Died: May 10, 1992 (aged 81); San Ramon, California, U.S.
- Batted: Right Threw: Left

MLB debut
- May 4, 1940, for the Detroit Tigers

Last MLB appearance
- September 28, 1945, for the Brooklyn Dodgers

MLB statistics
- Win–loss record: 12–9
- Earned run average: 4.47
- Strikeouts: 69
- Stats at Baseball Reference

Teams
- Detroit Tigers (1940); Brooklyn Dodgers (1945)

Thomas Edward Seats (September 24, 1910 – May 10, 1992) was an American Major League Baseball pitcher for the Detroit Tigers (1940) and the Brooklyn Dodgers (1945). The 5 ft 11 in (1.80 m), 190 lb (86 kg) left-hander was a native of Farmington, North Carolina.

Seats was 2–2 for the Tigers in 1940, and then was 10–7 for the Dodgers five years later during World War II. He made his major league debut in relief on May 4, 1940, against the Philadelphia Athletics at Shibe Park. His first major league win came two days later, also in relief, in a 6–4 victory over the New York Yankees at Yankee Stadium. He pitched his first major league shutout on May 11, 1945, against the St. Louis Cardinals at Ebbets Field. The score was 7–0.

Seats' career totals for 57 games include a 12–9 record, 20 games started, 6 complete games, 2 shutouts, 14 games finished, and 1 save. He allowed 88 earned runs in 177 1/3 innings pitched for an ERA of 4.47.

Seats died at the age of 81 in San Ramon, California. He was interred at Woodlawn Memorial Park in Colma, California.

== Trivia ==
- Even though he pitched just 121 2/3 innings in 1945, Seats tied for ninth among National League hurlers with 5 hit batsmen. By contrast, it took the other five pitchers who were tied with him for ninth an average of 179 2/3 innings to hit the same number of batters.
