= Del Baker =

American baseball player (1892–1973)

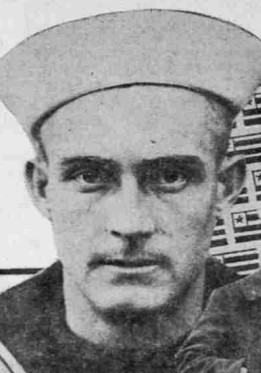
- Baker in 1918 as a member of the U.S. Navy during World War I
- Catcher
- Born: May 3, 1892; Sherwood, Oregon, U.S.
- Died: September 11, 1973 (aged 81); Olmos Park, Texas, U.S.
- Batted: Right Threw: Right

MLB debut
- April 16, 1914, for the Detroit Tigers

Last MLB appearance
- September 30, 1916, for the Detroit Tigers

MLB statistics
- Batting average: .209
- Home runs: 0
- Runs batted in: 22
- Stats at Baseball Reference
- Managerial record at Baseball Reference

Teams
- As player: Detroit Tigers (1914–1916); As manager: Detroit Tigers (1933,1936,1937）; Detroit Tigers (1938–1942）; Boston Red Sox (1960）

Career highlights and awards
- Manager of 1940 AL champion Tigers; World Series champion (1935)

Delmer David Baker (May 3, 1892 – September 11, 1973) was an American professional baseball player, coach, and manager. During his time as a player, he spent three years (1914–1916) in Major League Baseball (MLB) as a backup catcher for the Detroit Tigers. As a manager, he led the 1940 Tigers to the American League pennant. He worked as a coach for 20 years for three American League teams, and was known as one of the premier sign stealers of his era. His professional career encompassed half a century in organized baseball.

== Player and minor league manager ==
Baker threw and batted right-handed, stood 5 feet 11 inches (1.80 m) tall and weighed 176 pounds (80 kg). Born in Sherwood, Oregon, he was raised in neighboring Wilsonville. After graduating from a Portland business college, he took a job in 1909 as a bookkeeper in Wasco, Oregon, where he caught for the town team. In 1911, a scout signed him to a contract with the Spokane Indians of the Class A (equivalent to today's Triple A) Pacific National League, predecessor to the Pacific Coast League (PCL). In 1914 he was promoted to the Detroit Tigers, and played in 172 games over three seasons as a back-up for Oscar Stanage, batting .209 with 63 hits, including nine doubles and four triples. In 1917, the Tigers farmed him out to the PCL's San Francisco Seals. In 1918 he joined the war effort, serving in the US Navy, then returned to the PCL in 1920, this time with the Portland Beavers. After three seasons there, Baker spent a season with the Mobile Bears of the Class A Southern Association, then returned to the PCL for three more seasons with the Oakland Oaks.

After spending most of the 1928 season as player-manager of the Ogden Gunners in the Class C Utah-Idaho League, Baker moved to the Class A Texas League and caught for the Fort Worth Panthers in 1929. In 1930 he was appointed player-manager of the Beaumont Exporters, a premier Texas League team with some of Detroit's top prospects, including Schoolboy Rowe, Pete Fox, and Hank Greenberg. The Exporters won 100 games in 1932, then swept the Dallas Steers for the Texas League championship. When Detroit manager Bucky Harris promoted Rowe, Fox, and Greenberg to the major league level in 1933, he hired Baker to coach third base for the Tigers.

== Tigers coach and manager ==
Baker served as interim manager after Harris resigned with two games to play in the 1933 season, then returned to coaching third base under Harris' replacement, player-manager Mickey Cochrane. The Tigers won back-to-back AL pennants in 1934 and '35, and their first ever World Series title in 1935. Baker managed the team again in mid-1936, when Cochrane took a leave of absence due to what was described as a "nervous breakdown"; and again in mid-1937 after Cochrane suffered a fractured skull when he was hit by a pitch.

In 1938, the Tigers compiled an early-season record of 47–51; on August 7, Baker replaced Cochrane as manager. He rallied Detroit to 37 wins in 56 games, enough to finish in the first division, but Detroit slipped to fifth in 1939.

=== 1940 AL pennant ===
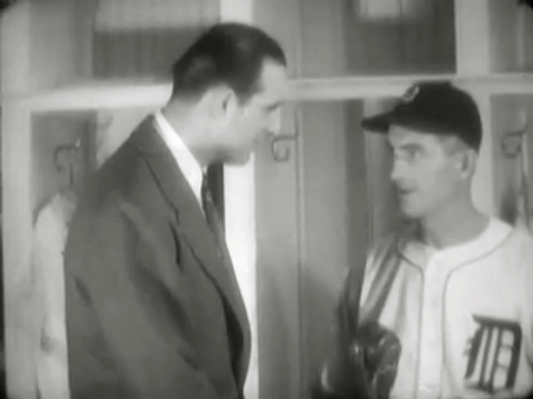
Baker meets with Hank Greenberg in 1941 before Greenberg departs for World War II.

In 1940, the New York Yankees, who had won the AL pennant and the World Series four years running, faltered, leaving the Tigers and the Cleveland Indians to contend for the league title. With three games remaining in the season, on Friday, September 27, and the two teams tied, Baker chose obscure rookie pitcher Floyd Giebell to pitch for the pennant against future Hall of Famer Bob Feller. Giebell threw a six-hit shutout. Rudy York hit a two-run home run, and Detroit won the game, 2–0, clinching the AL title. But in the World Series, they lost in seven games to the Cincinnati Reds despite Bobo Newsom's heroic pitching performances.

With World War II on the horizon, the 1941 season was marked by the call to active military service of numerous baseball stars, including Greenberg. With their star power hitter out of the lineup, and Newsom ineffective, Detroit fell below .500 that season, and again in 1942. Baker was replaced after the 1942 season by Steve O'Neill.

== Later career ==
Baker returned to the coaching ranks with Cleveland (1943–44) and the Boston Red Sox (1945–48; 1953–60). From 1949–51, he served as skipper of the Sacramento Solons and the San Diego Padres of the Pacific Coast League. In his final season, 1960, Baker managed one last time in the big leagues as Boston's interim pilot from June 8–12 between Billy Jurges' firing and Pinky Higgins' rehiring. Under Baker, the last-place Red Sox won two games and lost five. He retired from the game after his 50th season in baseball, his last day overshadowed by Ted Williams' last game as a player. Baker died at age 81 in Olmos Park, Texas.

== Sign stealing ==
As a coach and manager, Baker was known for his proficiency at detecting the type of pitch an opposing pitcher was about to deliver and tipping off his team's batter with verbal signals. He carefully observed each pitcher's idiosyncrasies, looking, he said, "for all the little quirks, details and tell‐tales." He found that many pitchers concealed the ball poorly before delivery, allowing him to see their grip. Others telegraphed their curve balls by bending their wrists, or subtly altering their wind‐ups. "There are also facial telltales. I know pitchers who, when they throw a curve, bite the lip or stick out the tongue," he said.

Tigers shortstop Dick Bartell wrote that the Tigers were unusually successful against Feller in 1940 because Baker was reading all of Feller’s pitches. Among Detroit hitters, it was said that Greenberg was the biggest beneficiary of Baker's tip-offs, although Greenberg himself said that "the importance of such information ... has been exaggerated."

Another apparent beneficiary was Don Larsen, who wrote in his memoir:

During the 1956 season, I struggled with my control from time to time. I had a so-so 7 and 5 record going into the last month of the season. In a ball game against the Red Sox in Boston, late in the season, I noticed that their third base coach, Del Baker, was watching me very closely. Del had a great reputation for being able to somehow steal pitching signs, and relay them to his hitters. After some thought, I came to the conclusion that with my full pitching delivery, he was gaining an advantage for the hitters by homing in on how I held the baseball before I threw it to the plate.

In response, Larsen adopted a "no-windup" delivery, which he used in the 1956 World Series to pitch the only perfect game in Series history, in Game Five.

== Managerial record ==
Team	Year	Regular season					Postseason			
Team	Year	Games	Won	Lost	Win %	Finish	Won	Lost	Win %	Result
DET	1933	2	2	0	–	5th in AL	–	–	–	–
DET	1936	34	18	16	.529	interim	–	–	–	–
DET	1937	64	41	23	.641	interim (two stints)	–	–	–	–
DET	1938	56	37	19	.661	4th in AL	–	–	–	–
DET	1939	154	81	73	.526	5th in AL	–	–	–	–
DET	1940	154	90	64	.584	1st in AL	3	4	.429	Lost World Series (CIN)
DET	1941	154	75	79	.487	4th in AL	–	–	–	–
DET	1942	154	73	81	.474	5th in AL	–	–	–	–
DET total		772	417	355	.540		3	4	.429	
BOS	1960	7	2	5	.286	interim	–	–	–	–
BOS total		7	2	5	.286		0	0	–	
Total		779	419	360	.538		3	4	.429	

Sporting positions
Preceded by Bucky Harris; Mickey Cochrane	Detroit Tigers manager 1933; 1938–1942	Succeeded by Mickey Cochrane; Steve O'Neill
Preceded by Bill Burwell	Boston Red Sox third-base coach 1945–1948	Succeeded by Kiki Cuyler
Preceded by Earle Combs	Boston Red Sox first-base coach 1953–1958	Succeeded by Rudy York
Preceded by Billy Jurges	Boston Red Sox manager 1960	Succeeded by Pinky Higgins
