= 1940 World Series =

1940 Major League Baseball championship series

Team (Wins)	Managers	Season
Cincinnati Reds (4)	Bill McKechnie	100–53, .654, GA: 12
Detroit Tigers (3)	Del Baker	90–64, .584, GA: 1
- Dates: October 2–8
- Venue(s): Crosley Field (Cincinnati); Briggs Stadium (Detroit)
- Umpires: Bill Klem (NL), Red Ormsby (AL); Lee Ballanfant (NL), Steve Basil (AL)
- Hall of Famers: Umpire: Bill Klem; Reds: Bill McKechnie (mgr.); Ernie Lombardi; Tigers: Earl Averill; Charlie Gehringer; Hank Greenberg; Hal Newhouser

Broadcast
- Radio: Mutual
- Radio announcers: Red Barber and Bob Elson

The 1940 World Series was the championship series in Major League Baseball for the 1940 season. The 37th edition of the World Series, it matched the Cincinnati Reds against the Detroit Tigers, with the Reds winning a closely contested seven-game series. The victory secured the Reds the second championship in their franchise history and came 21 years after their victory over the scandal-tainted Chicago White Sox in 1919. This would be the Reds' last World Series championship for 35 years despite appearances in 1961, 1970, and 1972, and is the only time in which the Reds won the World Series at home. Meanwhile, Bill Klem worked the last of his record 18 World Series as an umpire.

Other story lines marked this series. Henry Quillen Buffkin Newsom, the father of Detroit's star pitcher Bobo Newsom, died in a Cincinnati hotel room the day after watching him win Game 1. Newsom came back to hurl a shutout in Game 5 in his memory. Called on to start a third time after a single day of rest by Tiger manager Del Baker, he pitched well in Game 7 until the seventh inning, when the Reds scored two runs to take the lead and eventually the game and the Series.

The Reds' star pitchers Paul Derringer and Bucky Walters won two games apiece, with Derringer winning the decisive seventh game. Walters hurled two complete games, allowing only eight hits and three runs combined. He also hit a home run in Game 6 in the midst of his 4–0 shutout, which sent the Series to a Game 7.

It was redemption of sorts for the Reds, who returned to the World Series after being swept by the Yankees squad in 1939. The Reds' win in Game 2 against Detroit snapped a 10-game losing streak for the National League in the Series going back to Game 5 in 1937.

The victory culminated a somewhat turbulent season for the Reds, who played large stretches of the season without injured All-Star catcher Ernie Lombardi. And on August 3, Lombardi's backup, Willard Hershberger, committed suicide in Boston a day after a defensive lapse cost the Reds a game against the Bees. Hershberger was hitting .309 at the time of his death. The Reds dedicated the rest of the season to "Hershie." One of the stars in the World Series was 40-year-old Jimmie Wilson. Wilson had been one of the Reds' coaches before Hershberger's suicide forced him back onto the playing field as Lombardi's backup. With Lombardi hurting, Wilson did the bulk of the catching against Detroit and hit .353 for the Series and recorded the team's only stolen base.

Reds' manager Bill McKechnie became the first manager to win a World Series with two different teams, at the helm of the Pittsburgh Pirates in 1925, after trailing three games to one against Walter Johnson and the Washington Senators.

This was the last time the Tigers lost in the World Series until 2006.

== Summary ==
NL Cincinnati Reds (4) vs. AL Detroit Tigers (3)

Game	Date	Score	Location	Time	Attendance
1	October 2	Detroit Tigers – 7, Cincinnati Reds – 2	Crosley Field	2:09	31,793
2	October 3	Detroit Tigers – 3, Cincinnati Reds – 5	Crosley Field	1:54	30,640
3	October 4	Cincinnati Reds – 4, Detroit Tigers – 7	Briggs Stadium	2:08	52,877
4	October 5	Cincinnati Reds – 5, Detroit Tigers – 2	Briggs Stadium	2:06	54,093
5	October 6	Cincinnati Reds – 0, Detroit Tigers – 8	Briggs Stadium	2:26	55,189
6	October 7	Detroit Tigers – 0, Cincinnati Reds – 4	Crosley Field	2:01	30,481
7	October 8	Detroit Tigers – 1, Cincinnati Reds – 2	Crosley Field	1:47	26,854

== Matchups ==
=== Game 1 ===
Wednesday, October 2, 1940 1:30 pm (ET) at Crosley Field in Cincinnati, Ohio
Team	1	2	3	4	5	6	7	8	9	R	H	E
Detroit	0	5	0	0	2	0	0	0	0	7	10	1
Cincinnati	0	0	0	1	0	0	0	1	0	2	8	3
WP: Bobo Newsom (1–0) LP: Paul Derringer (0–1); Home runs: DET: Bruce Campbell (1); CIN: None

Bobo Newsom won Game 1 aided by a five-run second inning by Detroit. Two singles and an error loaded the bases before Pinky Higgins drove in two runs with a single. A walk reloaded the bases before Dick Bartell's two-run single. Bruce Campbell's RBI single knocked starter Paul Derringer out of the game. The Reds got on the board in the fourth when Ival Goodman hit a leadoff double and scored on Jimmy Ripple's single, but Campbell's two-run home run in the fifth off Whitey Moore extended the Tigers' lead to 7–1. The Reds got another run in the eighth when Billy Werber doubled and scored on Goodman's single, but nothing else as Detroit took a 1–0 series lead.

The Tigers' win in Game 1 was the first World Series game won by a non-New York City team since 1935. In every World Series between 1935 and 1940, either both teams were from New York City or a New York City team won in a sweep (1938 and 1939).

=== Game 2 ===
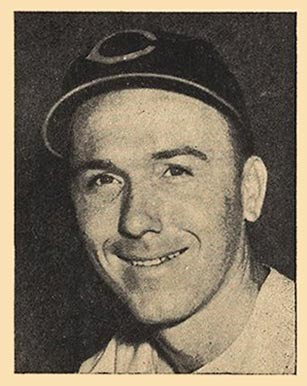
Jimmy Ripple

Thursday, October 3, 1940 1:30 pm (ET) at Crosley Field in Cincinnati, Ohio
Team	1	2	3	4	5	6	7	8	9	R	H	E
Detroit	2	0	0	0	0	1	0	0	0	3	3	1
Cincinnati	0	2	2	1	0	0	0	0	X	5	9	0
WP: Bucky Walters (1–0) LP: Schoolboy Rowe (0–1); Home runs: DET: None; CIN: Jimmy Ripple (1)

Detroit struck first in Game 2 Bucky Walters allowed two leadoff walks in the first, then an RBI single to Charlie Gehringer and ground-ball RBI double-play to Hank Greenberg, but the Reds tied it in the second on four singles off Schoolboy Rowe, two of which by Eddie Joost and Billy Myers scoring a run each. Next inning, Jimmy Ripple's two-run home run put the Reds up 4–2. Back-to-back doubles by Walters and Billy Werber made it 5–2 Reds in the fourth. The Tigers got a run in the sixth on Hank Greenberg's RBI double after a walk and forceout in the sixth, but nothing else besides Pinky Higgins's leadoff double in the fifth as the Reds tied the series with a 5–3 win heading to Detroit.

=== Game 3 ===
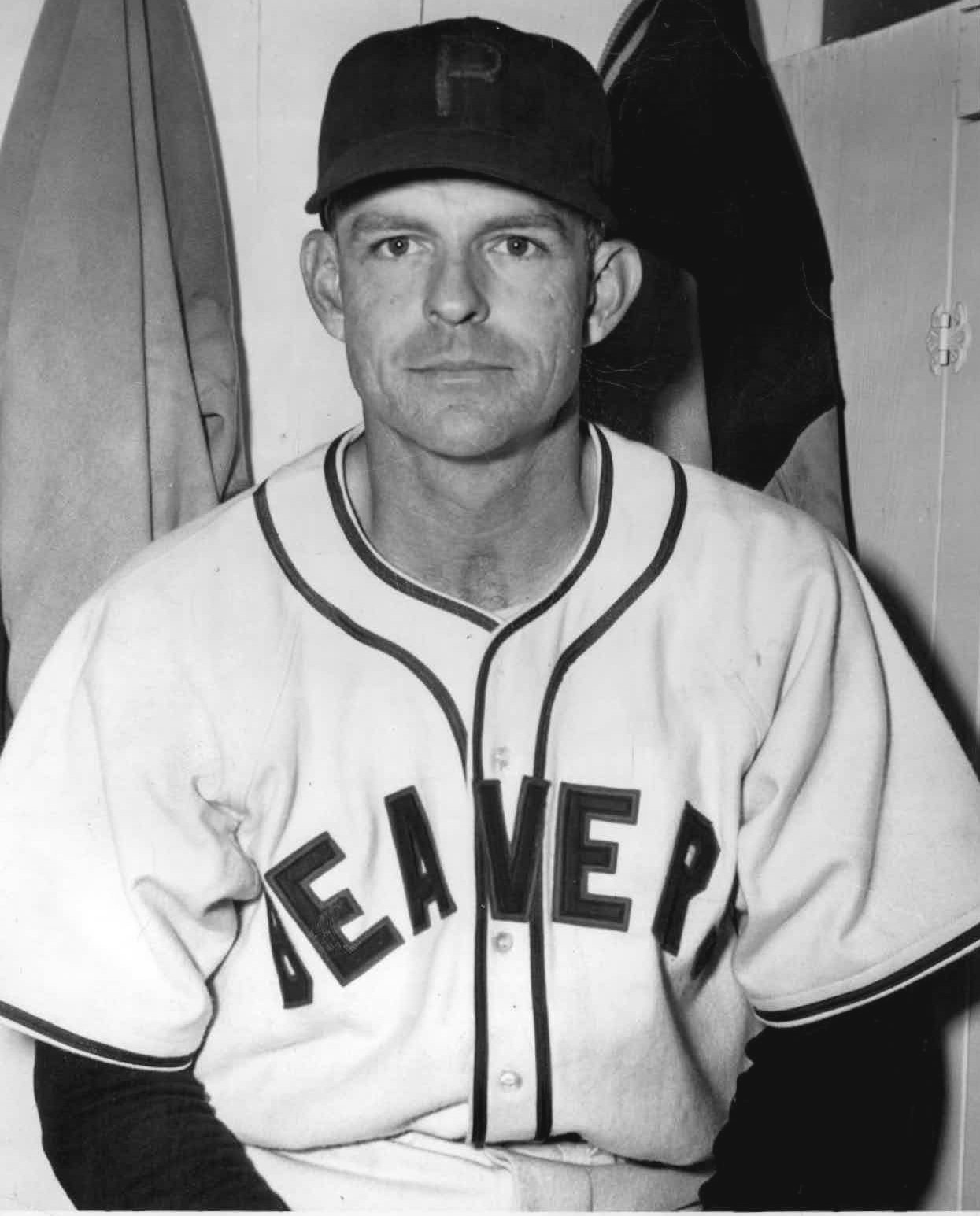
Tommy Bridges

Friday, October 4, 1940 1:30 pm (ET) at Briggs Stadium in Detroit, Michigan
Team	1	2	3	4	5	6	7	8	9	R	H	E
Cincinnati	1	0	0	0	0	0	0	1	2	4	10	1
Detroit	0	0	0	1	0	0	4	2	X	7	13	1
WP: Tommy Bridges (1–0) LP: Jim Turner (0–1); Home runs: CIN: None; DET: Rudy York (1), Pinky Higgins (1)

The Reds struck first in Game 3 when Billy Werber doubled to lead off the first off Tommy Bridges and scored on Ival Goodman's single, but the Tigers tied it in the fourth on Hank Greenberg's double-play after back-to-back leadoff singles off Jim Turner. Detroit went up 5–1 in the seventh on two-run home runs by Rudy York and Pinky Higgins. The Reds got a run in the eighth on Mike McCormick's RBI single with two on, but in the bottom half, Greenberg hit a leadoff triple off Joe Beggs before Bruce Campbell's RBI single and Higgins's RBI double made it 7–2 Tigers. In the ninth after a leadoff single and error, RBI singles by Eddie Joost and Werber made it 7–4 Tigers, but Bridges struck out McCormick to end the game as Detroit took a 2–1 series lead.

=== Game 4 ===
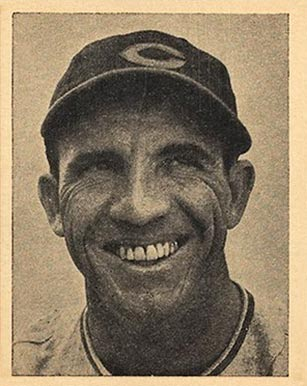
Ival Goodman

Saturday, October 5, 1940 1:30 pm (ET) at Briggs Stadium in Detroit, Michigan
Team	1	2	3	4	5	6	7	8	9	R	H	E
Cincinnati	2	0	1	1	0	0	0	1	0	5	11	1
Detroit	0	0	1	0	0	1	0	0	0	2	5	1
WP: Paul Derringer (1–1) LP: Dizzy Trout (0–1)

In Game 4, after a leadoff walk off Dizzy Trout, Ival Goodman's RBI double and Pinky Higgins's error on Jimmy Ripple's ground ball made it 2–0 Reds in the first. They made it 3–0 in the third on Jimmy Ripple's RBI double after two leadoff singles. The Tigers got on the board in the bottom half when Paul Derringer walked Barney McCosky, who moved to second on a groundout and scored on Hank Greenberg's RBI double, but the Reds got back that run in the fourth on Ival Goodman's sacrifice fly off Clay Smith after a leadoff walk and double. The Tigers got another run in the sixth Bruce Campbell singled with two outs and scored on Higgins's triple, but the Reds again got the run back in the eighth when Billy Werber singled with two outs off Archie McKain, moved to second on a wild pitch and scored on Mike McCormick's RBI single. Derringer pitched a complete game to give the Reds a 5–2 win, tying the series 2–2.

=== Game 5 ===
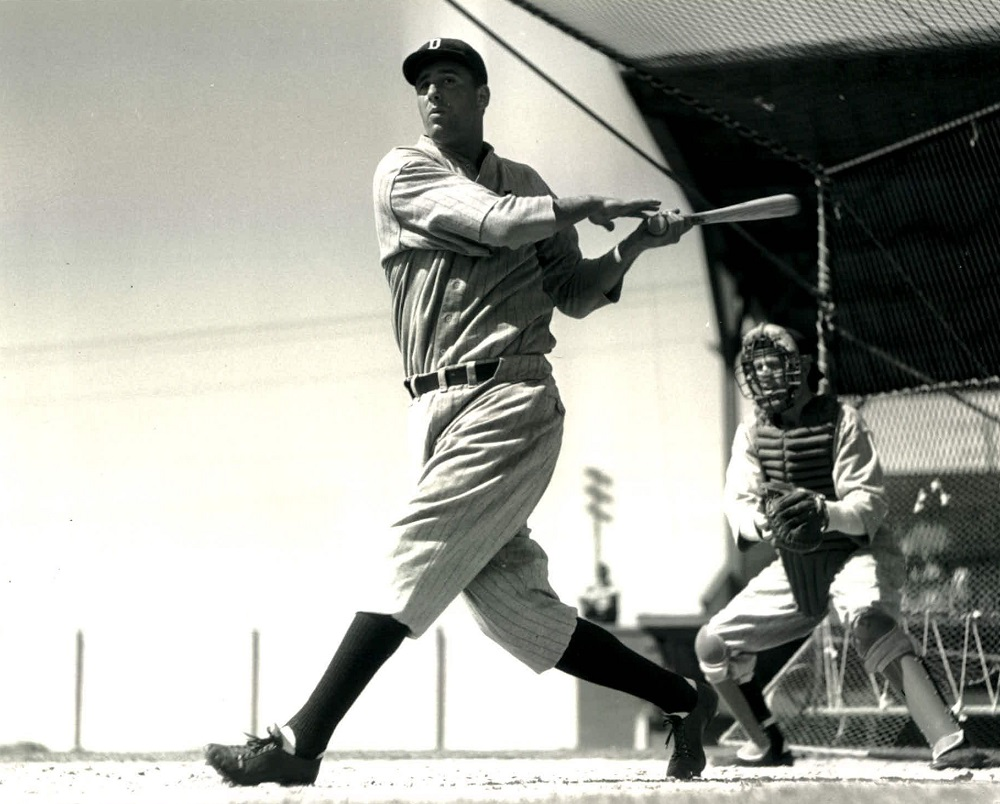
Hank Greenberg

Sunday, October 6, 1940 1:30 pm (ET) at Briggs Stadium in Detroit, Michigan
Team	1	2	3	4	5	6	7	8	9	R	H	E
Cincinnati	0	0	0	0	0	0	0	0	0	0	3	0
Detroit	0	0	3	4	0	0	0	1	X	8	13	0
WP: Bobo Newsom (2–0) LP: Junior Thompson (0–1); Home runs: CIN: None; DET: Hank Greenberg (1)

Bobo Newsom allowed only three singles and two walks in the shutout, the day after his father died. Detroit got on the board on Hank Greenberg's three-run home run after two leadoff singles in the third. Next inning, Billy Sullivan drew a leadoff walk, moved to second on a sacrifice bunt and scored on Dick Bartell's double. Two walks by starter Junior Thompson and reliever Whitey Moore loaded the bases before Hank Greenberg's sacrifice fly and after another walk, Bruce Campbell's two-run single made it 7–0 Tigers. They got another run in the eighth on Johnny Hutchings's wild pitch with two on and were just one win way from the championship heading back to Cincinnati.

=== Game 6 ===
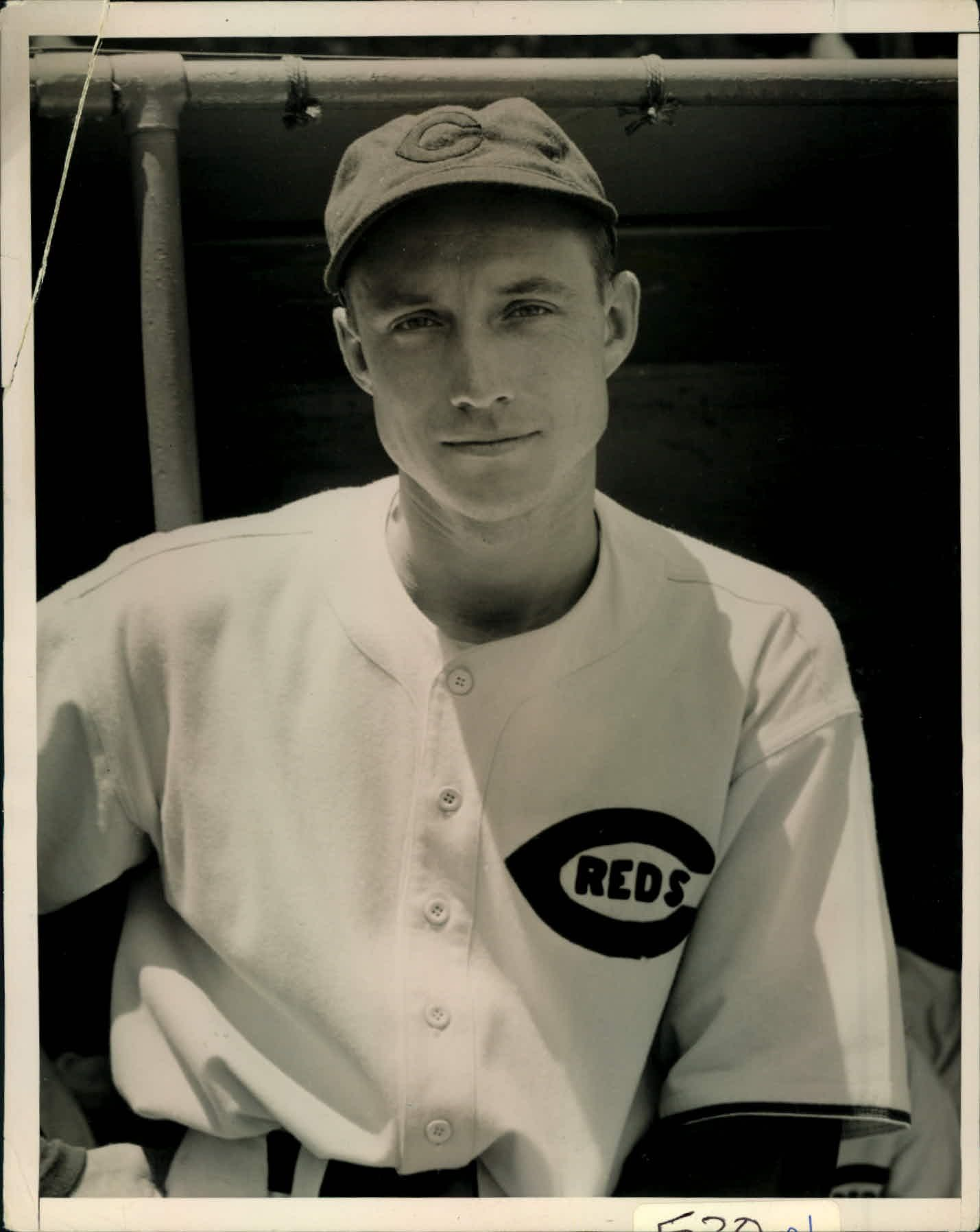
Bucky Walters

Monday, October 7, 1940 1:30 pm (ET) at Crosley Field in Cincinnati, Ohio
Team	1	2	3	4	5	6	7	8	9	R	H	E
Detroit	0	0	0	0	0	0	0	0	0	0	5	0
Cincinnati	2	0	0	0	0	1	0	1	X	4	10	2
WP: Bucky Walters (2–0) LP: Schoolboy Rowe (0–2); Home runs: DET: None; CIN: Bucky Walters (1)

Bucky Walters drew the Reds even with a five-hit shutout. He helped his own cause with an RBI fielder's choice in the sixth with the bases loaded off Johnny Gorsica and a solo home run in the eighth off Fred Hutchinson. Schoolboy Rowe was knocked out after just 1/3 of an inning, allowing four hits, including RBI singles to Ival Goodman and Jimmy Ripple. The Reds' 4–0 win forced a final Game 7.

=== Game 7 ===
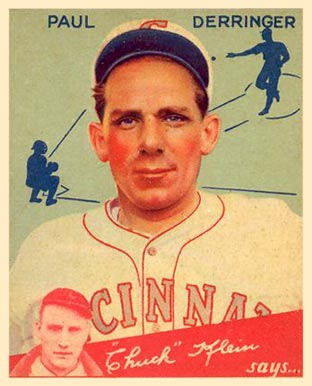
Paul Derringer

Tuesday, October 8, 1940 1:30 pm (ET) at Crosley Field in Cincinnati, Ohio
Team	1	2	3	4	5	6	7	8	9	R	H	E
Detroit	0	0	1	0	0	0	0	0	0	1	7	0
Cincinnati	0	0	0	0	0	0	2	0	X	2	7	1
WP: Paul Derringer (2–1) LP: Bobo Newsom (2–1)

Paul Derringer was matched against Bobo Newsom, with both pitchers going for a complete effort in a game that lasted 1 hour and 47 minutes. Detroit clung to a 1–0 lead, courtesy of Charlie Gehringer's third inning RBI single off Paul Derringer, until the seventh. In that inning, Frank McCormick hit a leadoff double for Cincinnati. Jimmy Ripple came up and then hit a double to score McCormick and tie the game. Jimmie Wilson came up and delivered a perfect sacrifice bunt to advance Ripple to third base. Ernie Lombardi, placed in the game to pinch-hit for Eddie Joost, was then intentionally walked to bring up Billy Myers. He hit a sacrifice fly on a ball to deep center that scored Ripple to deliver the go-ahead run. While Charlie Gehringer had a leadoff single in the 8th inning, the Tigers would not record a single hit afterwards, with Earl Averill grounding out to clinch the game and Series for the Reds.

== Composite line score ==
1940 World Series (4–3): Cincinnati Reds (NL) over Detroit Tigers (AL)

Team	1	2	3	4	5	6	7	8	9	R	H	E
Cincinnati Reds	5	2	3	3	0	1	2	4	2	22	58	8
Detroit Tigers	2	5	5	5	2	2	4	3	0	28	56	4
Total attendance: 281,927 Average attendance: 40,275; Winning player's share: $5,804 Losing player's share: $3,532

== Home runs by pitchers ==
Bucky Walters, converted to pitching only after a torn cartilage (not repairable in those days) had slowed him down as a runner, was the fourth National League pitcher to hit a home run during a World Series game. The others were:

Name/Team	Date	Game/Inning
Rosy Ryan (NYG)	October 6, 1924	Game 3, fourth
Jack Bentley (NYG)	October 8, 1924	Game 5, fifth
Jesse Haines (STL)	October 5, 1926	Game 3, fourth

== Aftermath ==
This was the last title won by the Reds until 1975, where they defeated the Boston Red Sox in seven games after being seven outs away from elimination in Game 7. In between 1940 and 1975, the Reds lost in their next three appearances in the Fall Classic, in 1961, 1970, and 1972.

This was the last time the Tigers lost in the World Series until 2006. The Tigers would return to the Fall Classic five years later, and defeated the Chicago Cubs in seven games. The Tigers would then win the World Series again in their next two appearances in 1968 and 1984.

As of 2025, this is the only time that the Reds have ever clinched a World Series championship at home.
