= Rudy York =

American baseball player and manager (1913–1970)

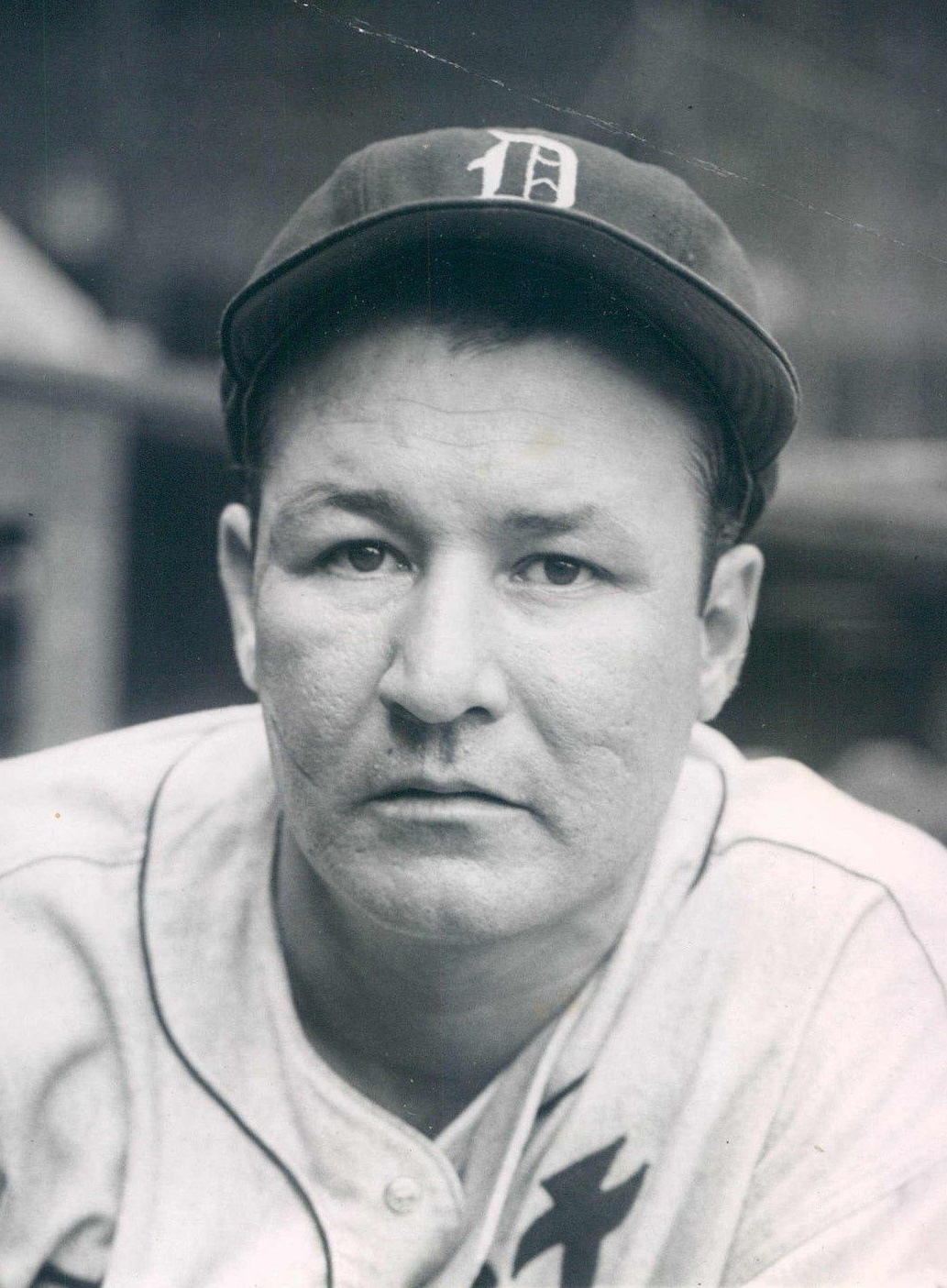
- York with the Detroit Tigers in 1945
- First baseman / Manager
- Born: August 17, 1913; Ragland, Alabama, U.S.
- Died: February 5, 1970 (aged 56); Rome, Georgia, U.S.
- Batted: Right Threw: Right

MLB debut
- August 22, 1934, for the Detroit Tigers

Last MLB appearance
- September 20, 1948, for the Philadelphia Athletics

MLB statistics
- Batting average: .275
- Home runs: 277
- Runs batted in: 1,149
- Stats at Baseball Reference

Teams
- As player: Detroit Tigers (1934, 1937–1945); Boston Red Sox (1946–1947); Chicago White Sox (1947); Philadelphia Athletics (1948); As manager: Boston Red Sox (1959)

Career highlights and awards
- 7× All-Star (1938, 1941–1944, 1946, 1947); World Series champion (1945); AL home run leader (1943); AL RBI leader (1943)

Preston Rudolph York (August 17, 1913 – February 5, 1970) was an American professional baseball player, coach, scout, and manager. He played in Major League Baseball as a catcher and a first baseman between 1934 and 1948, most notably as a member of the Detroit Tigers. He also played for the Boston Red Sox, Chicago White Sox and Philadelphia Athletics.

A seven-time All-Star, York broke Babe Ruth's record by hitting 18 home runs in a single month, a feat he accomplished as a rookie in August 1937. In 1943, he led the American League with 34 home runs, 118 runs batted in (RBIs), a .527 slugging percentage, and 301 total bases. He was the starting first baseman and leading slugger for the Detroit team that won the 1945 World Series. Between 1937 and 1947, York led the major leagues in home runs (277), RBIs (1,143), and total bases (2,838).

After his playing career, he worked from 1951 to 1964 as a professional baseball manager, coach, and scout. He was the batting coach for the Boston Red Sox for four years from 1959 to 1962, including one game in July 1959 in which he acted as the team's interim manager. He was posthumously inducted into the Michigan, Georgia, and Alabama Sports Halls of Fame.

== Early years ==
York was born in 1913 in Ragland, Alabama, but the family moved to Georgia when York was a young boy. York's father, Arthur, had only sporadic contact with the family. His mother, Beulah (Locklear) York, worked in Georgia's textile mills and raised York and his four siblings. "According to family history," his maternal great-grandmother Elizabeth Jane Barrett (Meadows) was a full-blooded Cherokee. York said in 1934 "There is some Cherokee blood in our family, but it goes a long way back. I really never tried to trace it and don’t know much about it."

In the late 1920s, York's mother moved the family to a mill town operated by the American Textile Company (ATCO) on the outskirts of Cartersville, Georgia. York joined his mother working at the mill and became the star player on the ATCO baseball team from 1930 to 1933.

== Professional baseball player ==
=== Minor leagues (1933–1936) ===
York began playing professional baseball at age 19. During the 1933 season, he played three games with the Knoxville Smokies of the Southern Association, 12 games with the Shreveport Sports of the Dixie League, and 15 games with the Beaumont Exporters of the Texas League.

York continued to work his way through the minor leagues in 1934, playing for Beaumont and the Fort Worth Cats of the Texas League. He was briefly called up to the Detroit Tigers late in the season, appearing in three games in which he had one hit in six at bats.

In 1935, York played 148 games at first base for Beaumont, compiled a .301 batting average, led the league with 29 home runs and 114 RBIs and was selected as the Most Valuable Player in the Texas League. Despite his solid performance in the Texas League, there was no room for him in Detroit as Hank Greenberg played 152 complete games at first base and led the American League with 36 home runs and 168 RBIs.

Greenberg missed most of the 1936 season with a broken wrist, but the Tigers traded for Jack Burns rather than calling up York. While Burns hit .283 with four home runs in Detroit, York played first base for the Milwaukee Brewers of the American Association. He appeared in 157 games, hit .334 with 37 home runs, and was selected as the Most Valuable Player in the American Association.

=== Detroit Tigers (1937–1945) ===
York finally spent a full season with the Tigers in 1937. With Greenberg recovered from his injury, York had to look to other positions for playing time. He appeared in 104 games, beginning at third base for 41 games and then moving to catcher for 54 games. He compiled a .307 batting average and a .651 slugging percentage with 35 home runs and 101 RBIs in just 375 at bats. His ratio of 10.7 at bats per home run led the American League, and his .651 slugging percentage ranked third. He hit 18 home runs and collected 50 RBIs in the month of August, breaking the major league records previously held by Babe Ruth and Lou Gehrig. Defensively, York was not as strong; his 12 passed balls led the league, and his nine errors in just 54 games at catcher ranked third in the league.

In 1938, York returned as the Tigers' catcher for 116 games and also played 14 games in left field. He hit .298, was selected for the All-Star team, and ranked among the American League leaders with 33 home runs (third), 128 RBIs (third), and a .579 slugging percentage (fifth). Defensively, he again led the league with 10 passed balls, but also ranked among the league's leading catchers with 70 assists (second) and 10 double plays (third).

During the 1939 season, York shared catching duties with Birdie Tebbetts and started only 78 games – 67 at catcher and 11 at first base. Despite having only 376 at bats, he performed well at the plate with a .307 batting average, .544 slugging percentage, 20 home runs, and 68 RBIs.

Realizing that York was not best suited to the catcher position, and seeking to get his bat into the lineup on a full-time basis, the Tigers in 1940 shifted slugger Hank Greenberg from first base to left field, allowing York to return to his natural position at first base. The move proved successful as Greenberg and York each played 154 games and ranked highly among the league's batters in several key batting statistics: first and second in RBIs (150 and 134); first and second in total bases (384 and 343); first and second in doubles (50 and 46); and first and third in home runs (41 and 33). The power duo of Greenberg and York helped propel the Tigers to the American League pennant with a 90–64 record. In the 1940 World Series, the Tigers lost to the Cincinnati Reds as York batted .231 (6-for-26) with one home run and two RBIs. (On August 24, in the first game of a doubleheader in Boston, York received an unwanted distinction when his future teammate, slugger Ted Williams, was called in to pitch in a 12-1 Tigers rout. Williams struck out York looking, making York the only man Ted ever whiffed in a big-league game.)

While York was rejected for military service in World War II due to a bad knee, the Tigers lost Hank Greenberg to the U.S. Army for the 1941 season, leaving York as the team's principal offensive weapon. Starting 155 games at first base for the second consecutive year, York received his second selection to the All-Star game. His batting average declined to .259, but he continued to hit for power with 27 home runs (including a three-home-run game on September 1st at Detroit) and 111 RBIs.

In 1942, York held out during spring training when the Tigers asked him to take a salary cut. In mid-March, he finally signed a contract providing a salary of approximately $9,000 with a $5,000 bonus if he collected 100 RBIs. He ended up hitting .260 with 21 home runs and 90 RBIs. In the 1942 All-Star Game, he hit a two-run home run in the first inning to propel the American League to a 3–1 victory over the National League.

York slumped badly at the plate for the first half of the 1943 season, drawing boos from the fans. Detroit sport writer H. G. Salsinger wrote at the time:

"York got away to a bad start and soon found himself in a severe slump. He went from bad to worse . . . His fielding became as bad as his batting and he appeared to be on the verge of a nervous breakdown . . . The crowds at Briggs Stadium were 'riding' Rudy. Few players in history have ever been 'ridden' harder. They booed him from the time his name was announced in the starting lineup until the last man was out. They booed him every time he came to bat, every time he went after a batted ball, every time he took a throw. The razzing didn't start this year. The fans were ‘aboard’ York last season. He took an unmerciful booing all through 1942, and the booing increased with the start of the present season."

York rebounded in the second half of the 1943 season, hitting 17 home runs in August, and ended up leading the American League with 34 home runs, 118 RBIs, a .527 slugging percentage, 67 extra-base hits, and 301 total bases. He was selected to his fifth All-Star team and finished third in the voting for the American League Most Valuable Player award.

In 1944, York was selected to the All-Star team for the sixth year, and York ranked among the American League leaders with 18 home runs (third), 98 RBIs (fifth), and 256 total bases (eighth). He also ranked among the league leaders in several defensive categories, both positive and negative, with 17 errors at first base (first), 163 double plays turned at first base (first), 1,453 putouts at all positions (second), and a 10.45 range factor per nine innings at first base.

In 1945, he started 155 games at first base for the Tigers team that won the American League pennant and defeated the Chicago Cubs in the 1945 World Series. During the 1945 season, he ranked among the league leaders with 23 double plays grounded into (first), 18 home runs (second), 85 strikeouts (second), 87 RBIs (fourth), 246 total bases (fourth), and 48 extra-base hits (fifth). Defensively, he led all position players with a career-high 1,464 putouts. He also led the league's first basemen with 19 errors. In the 1945 World Series, he had five hits and three RBIs in 28 at bats.

On January 3, 1946, with the Tigers' planning to return Hank Greenberg to first base, the Tigers traded York to the Boston Red Sox for infielder Eddie Lake.

=== Boston Red Sox (1946–47) ===
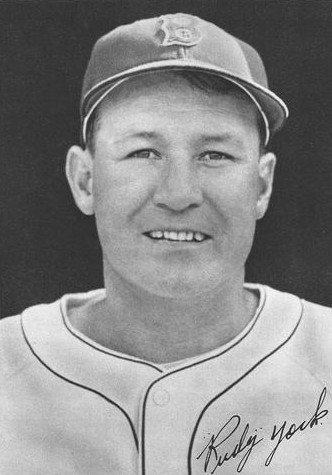
York in 1947

In 1946, York started 154 games at first base for Boston and finished among the American League leaders with 1,326 putouts (first), 116 assists at first base (first), 154 double plays turned at first base (first), and 119 RBIs (third). He hit two grand slams in a game against the St. Louis Browns on July 27, 1947, as part of a 10 RBI day. The combination of York, Ted Williams, and Bobby Doerr helped lead Boston to the American League pennant. In the 1946 World Series against the St. Louis Cardinals, he hit a 10th-inning game-winning home run in Game 1 and another three-run, game-winning home run in the Game 3. Ultimately, St. Louis took the series four games to three.

In 1947, York started 48 games at first base for the Red Sox. On April 26, York escaped an early-morning fire in his Boston hotel suite caused when he fell asleep with a cigarette in his hand and liquor bottles strewn around. His batting average dipped to .212 with six home runs and 27 RBIs. By early June, York's poor hitting and inconsistent effort prompted The Boston Globe to publish an article titled, "What to Do About Big Rudy York?" On June 14, 1947, the Red Sox traded York to the Chicago White Sox in exchange for Jake Jones.

=== Chicago and Philadelphia (1947–48) ===
After the trade from Boston, York started 102 games at first base for the White Sox and compiled a .243 batting average with 15 home runs and 64 RBIs. On August 23, 1947, a fire broke out in York's Chicago hotel room, reportedly caused by a cigar that York left lit. York was unconditionally released by the White Sox in January 1948.

On February 12, 1948, two weeks after being released by the White Sox, York signed with the Philadelphia Athletics. He played in just 31 games, batting just .157. He appeared in his last major league game on September 20, 1948.

=== Return to the minors (1949) ===
After his major league baseball career ended, York continued to play when and where he could. It is believed that his playing career finally ended in 1952 when he batted .258 with two home runs for Benson-DeGraff in Minnesota's Class AA amateur Western Minny league.

=== Career statistics ===
In 13 major league seasons, York compiled a .275 batting average with 1,621 hits in 5,891 at-bats, a .483 slugging percentage, 291 doubles, 52 triples, 792 walks, 277 home runs, and 1,149 RBIs in 1,603 games. In three World Series appearances, he hit .221 (17-for-77) with three home runs and 10 RBIs. He was selected for the All-Star Game seven times. York's 239 home runs as a Tiger ranked second in franchise history until the 1960s and still ranks eighth all time. In each of the time he was in the top ten for walks (1938, 1940, 1941, 1943, 1944, 1946), he also ranked in the top five for strikeouts; in total, he also went in the top five for strikeouts three further times (1942, 1945, 1947) in strikeouts to make nine times.

With 1/8 Cherokee ancestry and less-than-perfect fielding abilities, York prompted one sportswriter to declare: "He is part Indian and part first baseman". However, his defensive weakness may have been exaggerated. While he did lead the American League in errors by a first baseman in 1941, 1944, and 1945, he also led the league's first basemen in fielding percentage in 1947, in assists in 1942, 1943, and 1946, in putouts in 1946 and 1947, and in double plays turned in 1944 and 1946. And his range factor per game ranked among the top five in the league in 1940, 1941, 1942, 1944, 1945, 1946, and 1947.

== Manager, coach and scout ==
York was a player-manager for the Youngstown/Oil City Athletics during the 1951 season. He hit 34 home runs and had 107 RBIs, but his record as manager was 19–64. He played for a semi-pro baseball team in 1952 and then obtained work outside baseball with the Georgia Forestry Commission in 1953. He returned to baseball as a scout for the New York Yankees in 1956. In June 1957, he was named by the Cleveland Indians as the manager of their North Platte team in the Nebraska State League.

In January 1958, York returned to the Boston Red Sox for a six-year association. He was first hired as a coach for the Memphis Chicks, the Bosox' Double-A affiliate. In 1959, he was promoted to the MLB Red Sox as the team's batting coach. On July 3, 1959, he served as Boston's acting manager for one game during the interim period between Pinky Higgins' firing and the hiring of Washington Senators coach Billy Jurges as Higgins' permanent successor. In York's one game as manager, the Red Sox lost to the Baltimore Orioles, 6–1.

In 1963, with the hiring of Johnny Pesky as Boston's manager, York lost his job as the team's batting coach. However, Red Sox owner Tom Yawkey decided not to let York go and assigned him to the coaching staff of the Reading Red Sox for the 1963 season.

In 1964, York concluded his managing career as the manager of the Statesville Colts, a joint affiliate of the Red Sox and the Houston Colt 45s in the Western Carolinas League. Hired by former Tiger teammate Paul Richards, he then was listed as a scout for the Houston franchise, renamed the Astros, in 1965.

=== Managerial record ===
Team	Year	Regular season					Postseason			
Team	Year	Games	Won	Lost	Win %	Finish	Won	Lost	Win %	Result
BOS	1959	1	0	1	.000	interim	–	–	–	–
Total		1	0	1	.000		0	0	–	

== Family, later years, and tributes ==
York married Violet Dupree (1913–1988) in 1931. They had three children: Mary Jane (York) Pruitt (born 1932); the Rev. Joe Wilburn York (born 1936); and Blanche (York) Hines (born 1940).

After retiring from baseball, York worked as a self-employed house painter in Cartersville, Georgia. He developed lung cancer and underwent surgery and radiation therapy in November 1969. He died in February 1970 at Floyd County Hospital in Rome, Georgia, at age 56. The cause of death was reported to be bacterial pneumonia. York was buried at Sunset Memory Gardens in Cartersville.

In 1972, the former Atco Field in Cartersville was renamed Rudy York Field. At the dedication ceremony, Gov. Lester Maddox unveiled a five-foot high marble monument and a bronze plaque honoring York.

York was posthumously inducted in the Michigan Sports Hall of Fame in 1972. His widow and three children all attended the induction ceremony in Detroit. York was also inducted into the Georgia Sports Hall of Fame in 1977, and the Alabama Sports Hall of Fame in 1979.

== See also ==
- Batters with two Grand Slams in the same baseball game
- List of athletes on Wheaties boxes
- List of Major League Baseball career home run leaders
- List of Major League Baseball career runs batted in leaders
- List of Major League Baseball annual runs batted in leaders
- List of Major League Baseball annual home run leaders

Sporting positions
Preceded by Del Baker	Boston Red Sox first-base coach 1959–1962	Succeeded by Harry Malmberg
