= Barney McCosky =

American baseball player (1917–1996)

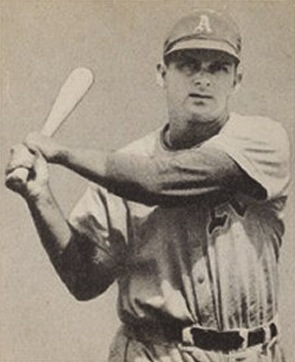
- Outfielder
- Born: April 11, 1917; Coal Run, Pennsylvania, U.S.
- Died: September 6, 1996 (aged 79); Venice, Florida, U.S.
- Batted: Left Threw: Right

MLB debut
- April 18, 1939, for the Detroit Tigers

Last MLB appearance
- July 8, 1953, for the Cleveland Indians

MLB statistics
- Batting average: .312
- Home runs: 24
- Runs batted in: 397
- Stats at Baseball Reference

Teams
- Detroit Tigers (1939–1942, 1946); Philadelphia Athletics (1946–1948, 1950–1951); Cincinnati Reds (1951); Cleveland Indians (1951–1953)

William Barney McCosky (April 11, 1917 – September 6, 1996) was an American outfielder in Major League Baseball. From 1939 through 1953, he played for the Detroit Tigers (1939–42, 1946), Philadelphia Athletics (1946–1948, 1950–1951), Cincinnati Reds (1951), and Cleveland Indians (1951–1953). McCosky batted left-handed and threw right-handed. McCosky played in 1,170 games, 535 in center field and 477 in left field. He had a career batting average of .312.

== Early years ==
McCosky was born in Coal Run, Somerset County, Pennsylvania, the last of nine children. His mother died when he was one year old, and McCosky moved to Detroit at age 4 with his older brother Tony McCosky. McCosky grew up in Detroit in the midst of the Great Depression. He later recalled: "Nobody had any money. We took mustard sandwiches and ketchup sandwiches to school." McCosky attended Southwestern High School in Detroit, where he was All-City and captain in both baseball and basketball. McCosky had a .727 batting average his senior year — a Detroit public school record.

== Professional baseball player ==
=== Minor leagues ===
In 1936, McCosky was signed out of high school by Tigers' scout Wish Egan. In 1936, he hit .400 for the Charleston Senators and led the Mid-Atlantic League. He played next for the Beaumont Exporters from 1936 to 1938. He hit .318 in 1937 and .307 in 1938.

=== Detroit Tigers ===
In 11 major league seasons, McCosky was a .312 hitter with 24 home runs and 397 RBIs in 1,170 games played. McCosky was a good contact hitter who hit over .300 in six of his first seven seasons. A fine outfielder with a strong throwing arm, he collected a .984 fielding average with only 41 errors in 2579 chances.

In 1939, McCosky's rookie season, he was an immediate success both at bat and in the field. He started 145 games in center field and hit for a .311 batting average — trailing only Hank Greenberg and his boyhood hero, Charlie Gehringer, among the Tigers' starters. With great range and speed in the outfield, he led all American League outfielders with 428 putouts and led the league's center fielders with a .986 fielding percentage. His 1939 Range factor of 3.00 was a career-high and 0.65 points above the league average. He was also near the top of the American League leaderboard in 1939 with 120 runs scored (fourth), 190 hits (fourth), 20 stolen bases (fourth), 262 times on base (fifth), 33 doubles (sixth) and 14 triples (second). He placed 27th in the American League Most Valuable Player voting.

His most productive season came for the 1940 Detroit Tigers American League champions, when he was among the AL league leaders with a .340 batting average (6th in the AL), 200 hits (tied for 1st in the AL), 19 triples (1st in the AL), 123 runs (3rd in the AL), 264 times on base (4th in the AL), and 39 doubles (7th in the AL). In the World Series, he hit .304 (7-for-23) with five runs as Detroit lost to the Cincinnati Reds in seven games. McCosky finished No. 16 in the MVP voting for 1940. Since 1940, the only Tiger to exceed McCosky's 19 triples is Curtis Granderson in 2007.

McCosky had another solid season in 1941, as he hit .324 and finished No. 15 in the American League MVP voting.

=== U. S. Navy ===
In December 1942, McCosky joined the United States Navy during World War II. McCosky lost three years in the prime of his career (at ages 26–28) to military service during World War II. He was discharged in October 1945.

=== Philadelphia Athletics ===
McCosky returned to Detroit in 1946. After a disappointing .198 start in 25 games, he was traded to the Philadelphia Athletics in mid-May for George Kell. In his autobiography, Kell recalled being shocked that the Tigers would trade a "legitimate star" and "hometown boy" like McCosky for an "unknown third baseman." At the time of the trade, McCosky told Kell: "You'll be better off here in Detroit. You're going to love it here. I hate to leave because this is home. I've had good years here."

Playing for manager Connie Mack, McCosky broke out of his early season slump and hit .354 for the A's. In 1947, McCosky batted .328 (2nd best in the AL) for the Athletics and finished a career-best No. 11 in the AL MVP voting. In 1948, he hit .326 (5th best in the AL), had a .405 on-base percentage (6th in the AL), and scored 95 runs.

McCosky missed the entire 1949 season after a back injury, and was never the same batter afterward. He returned to the Athletics in 1950, but his average dropped 86 points from .326 in 1948 to .240 in 1950.

On April 26, 1951, McCosky broke up a no-hitter bid of Washington Senators Connie Marrero with a home run.

=== Cincinnati and Cleveland ===
One week later, McCosky was sold to the Cincinnati Reds. He was then released and picked up off waivers by the Cleveland Indians. He managed only 37 hits in 1951 for a .268 average. McCosky finished his career playing with the Indians, as his batting average dropped further to .213 in 1952 and .190 in 1953.

Six times he was considered in the American League MVP vote (1939–42, 1947–48). In 1995, he was inducted into the National Polish-American Sports Hall of Fame.

== Later years ==
McCosky married his wife, Jane, in 1946. After his baseball career ended, he operated Barney McCosky's party store on Joy Road between Greenfield and Southfield in Detroit from 1953 to 1963. He then worked as an automobile salesman at Les Stanford Chevrolet in Dearborn, Michigan, until he retired in 1982.

In 1982, McCosky and his wife moved to Venice, Florida, where they lived for 14 years. In 1996, McCosky died from jaw cancer at Bon Secour-Venice Hospital in Venice. He was buried at Holy Sepulchre Cemetery in Southfield, Michigan.

In 1957, a baseball little league was formed and named the Barney McCosky Little League.

== See also ==
- List of Major League Baseball annual triples leaders
