= Bobo Newsom =

American baseball player (1907–1962)

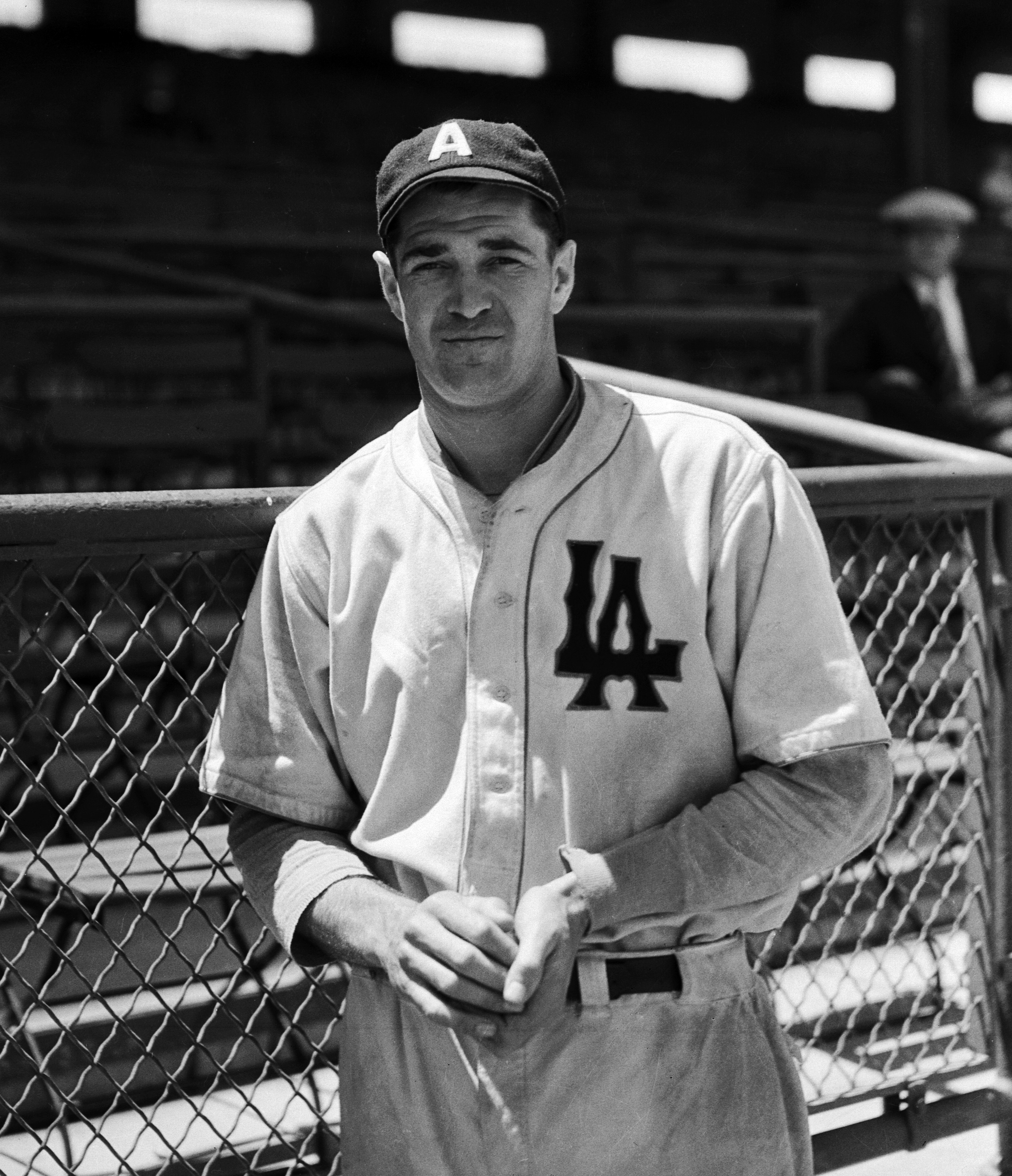
- Newsom with the Los Angeles Angels
- Pitcher
- Born: August 11, 1907; Hartsville, South Carolina, U.S.
- Died: December 7, 1962 (aged 55); Orlando, Florida, U.S.
- Batted: Right Threw: Right

MLB debut
- September 11, 1929, for the Brooklyn Robins

Last MLB appearance
- September 17, 1953, for the Philadelphia Athletics

MLB statistics
- Win–loss record: 211–222
- Earned run average: 3.98
- Strikeouts: 2,082
- Stats at Baseball Reference

Teams
- Brooklyn Robins / Dodgers (1929–1930); Chicago Cubs (1932); St. Louis Browns (1934–1935); Washington Senators (1935–1937); Boston Red Sox (1937); St. Louis Browns (1938–1939); Detroit Tigers (1939–1941); Washington Senators (1942); Brooklyn Dodgers (1942–1943); St. Louis Browns (1943); Washington Senators (1943); Philadelphia Athletics (1944–1946); Washington Senators (1946–1947); New York Yankees (1947); New York Giants (1948); Washington Senators (1952); Philadelphia Athletics (1952–1953)

Career highlights and awards
- 4× All-Star (1938–1940, 1944); World Series champion (1947); AL strikeout leader (1942)

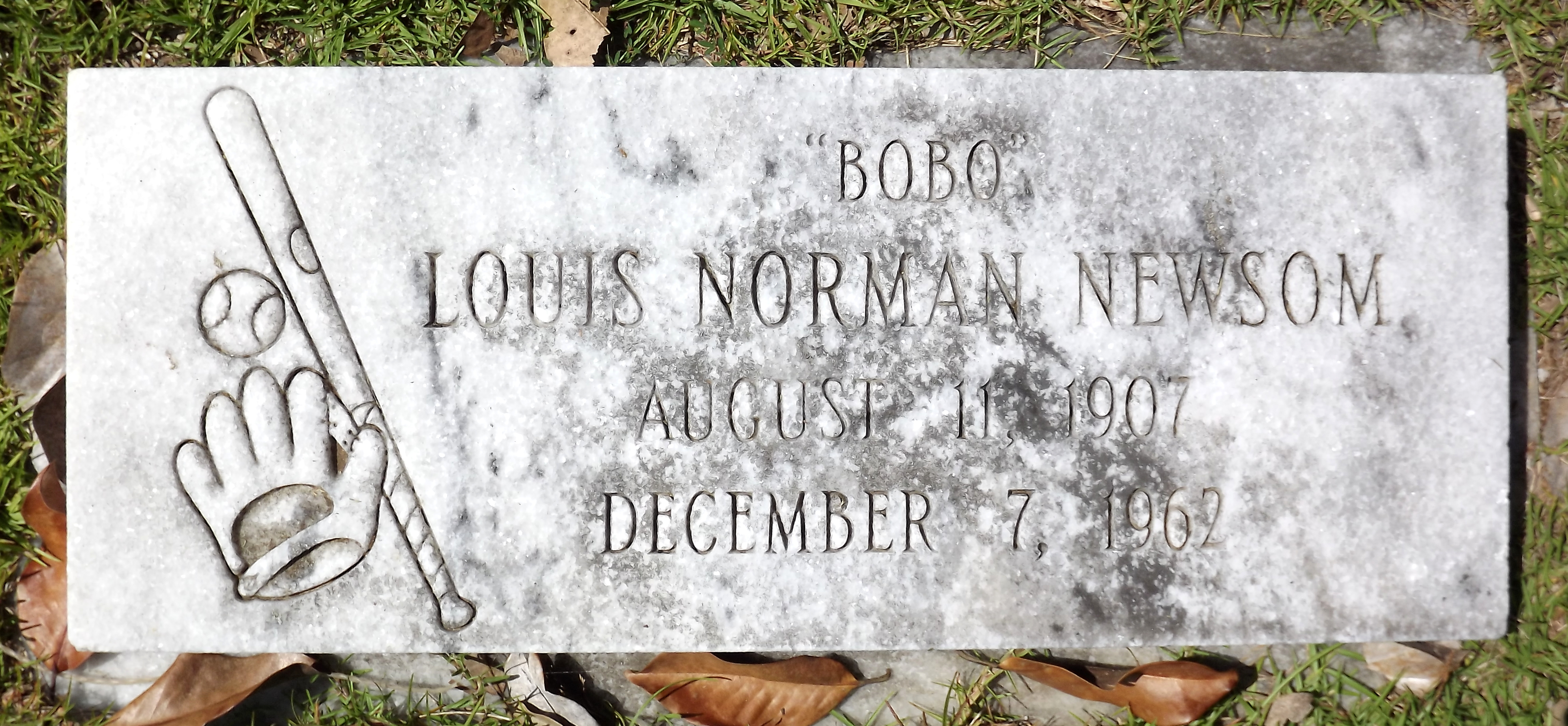
Bobo Newsom's headstone at Magnolia Cemetery in Hartsville, South Carolina

Louis Norman "Bobo" Newsom (August 11, 1907 – December 7, 1962) was an American starting pitcher in Major League Baseball. Also known as "Buck", Newsom played for nine of the 16 then-existing big-league teams from 1929 through 1953 over all or parts of 20 seasons, appearing in an even 600 games pitched and 3,7591/3 innings pitched. He batted and threw right-handed, stood 6 feet 3 inches (1.91 m) tall and weighed 200 pounds (91 kg).

== Life and career ==
Born in Hartsville, South Carolina, Newsom was known to possess a somewhat eccentric and emotional personality, typically referring to everyone in the third person, including referring to himself as "Bobo".

He was traded along with Red Kress and Buster Mills from the Red Sox to the Browns for Joe Vosmik on December 3, 1937.

Newsom pitched valiantly in a losing cause in Game Seven of the 1940 World Series with the Detroit Tigers, two days after pitching a shutout in honor of his father, who had died while visiting from South Carolina and watching his son win the opener. Bobo had said before pitching Game Five, "I'll win this one for my daddy." When manager Del Baker named Newsom to take the mound for Game Seven, Bobo was asked by reporters, "will you win this one for your daddy too?" "Why, no", Newsom said, "I think I'll win this one for old Bobo."

Newsom's performance in 1941 was a disappointment, as he lost 20 games, winning only 12. When Tigers' general manager Jack Zeller negotiated a contract with Newsom, he said, "You'll have to take a salary cut, Newsom, since you lost 20 games last season." The plain-spoken Bobo, remembering that Commissioner Kenesaw Mountain Landis had just found Zeller to be violating league rules and subsequently released players on Tigers' minor-league teams that were under the major-league club's control, snapped, "Hell, you lost ninety-one of Briggs' [the team owner] ball players last year, and I don't see you taking no cut." Zeller was not amused and traded Newsom to the Washington Senators.

Although Newsom pitched poorly in Game 3, allowing five runs in less than two innings, he garnered a Series ring while with the New York Yankees in 1947.

In a 20-season career, Newsom posted a 211–222 record with 2082 strikeouts and a 3.98 ERA in 3759 1/3 innings pitched. He also made the American League All-Star team from 1938 to 1940 and in 1944. With 211 wins, he is one of the 100 winningest pitchers of all time. His 222 losses also make him one of only two major league pitchers to win 200 games and still have a sub .500 career winning percentage, the other being Jack Powell. Upon his retirement in 1953, he was the last major leaguer to have played in the 1920s to still be active. Newsom is one of only 29 players in baseball history to date to have appeared in Major League games in four decades.

Al Benton is the only major-league pitcher to have faced both Babe Ruth and Mickey Mantle. Newsom was the only other pitcher whose career spanned that of both hitters. He did face Ruth in 1934; however, in 1951, Mantle's first year, Newsom was out of the majors, and in 1952, Newsom never faced the Yankees—and the one time he faced them in 1953, Mantle was out of the lineup with an injury.

Newsom died in Orlando, Florida at age 55 from cirrhosis of the liver. Newsom is buried at Magnolia Cemetery in his home town of Hartsville, which also has a street named in his honor.

Newsom is mentioned in the 1949 poem "Line-Up for Yesterday" by Ogden Nash, where he is the only player mentioned still not in the Hall of Fame as of 2026:

Line-Up for Yesterday

N is for Newsom,
Bobo's favorite kin.
You ask how he's here,
He talked himself in.

— Ogden Nash, Sport magazine (January 1949)

== See also ==
- Best pitching seasons by a Detroit Tiger
- List of Major League Baseball career wins leaders
- List of Major League Baseball players who played in four decades
- List of Major League Baseball annual strikeout leaders
- List of Major League Baseball career strikeout leaders
- Major League Baseball titles leaders

== Books ==
- Bobo Newsom, Baseball's Traveling Man by Jim McConnell (McFarland & Company, Jefferson, North Carolina, 2016)
