= Schoolboy Rowe =

American baseball player (1910–1961)

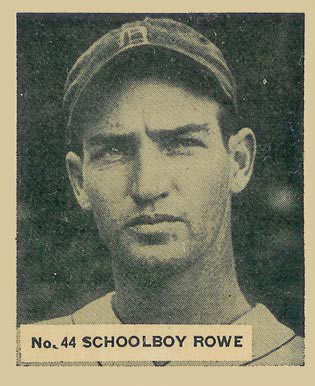
- 1936 Rowe baseball card
- Pitcher
- Born: January 11, 1910; Waco, Texas, U.S.
- Died: January 8, 1961 (aged 50); El Dorado, Arkansas, U.S.
- Batted: Right Threw: Right

MLB debut
- April 15, 1933, for the Detroit Tigers

Last MLB appearance
- September 13, 1949, for the Philadelphia Phillies

MLB statistics
- Win–loss record: 158–101
- Earned run average: 3.87
- Strikeouts: 913
- Stats at Baseball Reference

Teams
- Detroit Tigers (1933–1942); Brooklyn Dodgers (1942); Philadelphia Phillies (1943, 1946–1949)

Career highlights and awards
- 3× All-Star (1935, 1936, 1947); World Series champion (1935)

Lynwood Thomas "Schoolboy" Rowe (January 11, 1910 – January 8, 1961) was an American right-handed pitcher in Major League Baseball, primarily for the Detroit Tigers (1932–42) and Philadelphia Phillies (1943, 1946–49). He was a three-time All-Star (1935, 1936, and 1947) and a member of three Tigers' World Series teams (1934, 1935 and 1940).

== Early years ==
Rowe was born in Waco, Texas, in 1910. He was brought up in El Dorado, Arkansas, and attended El Dorado High School. Growing to 6 ft 4 in (1.93 m), Rowe was an all-around athlete, receiving all-state football honors as a quarterback, competing in over 100 professional boxing matches, and playing for the Brown Paper mill basketball team that advanced to the semifinals of the national A.A.U. tournament. He also competed in tennis and golf.

There were varying published accounts of how Rowe got the nickname "Schoolboy".

- In a 1932 interview, Rowe said the nickname dated back to his grammar school days when he was competing as a boxer. Rowe recalled, "First it was 'Newsboy," Rowe with the sports writers and then 'Schoolboy.'"

== Professional baseball ==
=== Minor leagues ===
In 1932, Rowe began his professional baseball career with the Beaumont Exporters, the Texas League affiliate of the Detroit Tigers. He appeared in 31 games, 29 as a starter, compiling a 19–7 record in the regular season with a 2.30 earned run average (ERA). He also hit ten home runs and compiled a .290 batting average. The 1932 Exporters won 100 games and the Texas League championship, with Rowe pitching and future Detroit Tigers teammate Hank Greenberg leading the team in batting.

=== Rookie season (1933) ===
Rowe was promoted to the Tigers' big-league roster in 1933 after only one season in the minor leagues. He appeared in his first major league game on April 15, pitching a complete game shutout against the Chicago White Sox. His rookie season was cut short in July by a shoulder injury sustained while throwing to first base after fielding a bunt. He appeared in 19 games, 15 as a starter, compiling a 7–4 record with 75 strikeouts and a 3.58 ERA.

=== 16-game winning streak (1934) ===
In the spring of 1934, Rowe's arm remained unwell. The team's new player-manager Mickey Cochrane was planning to send Rowe back to the minors if Rowe's arm did not improve. He remained with the Tigers but performed poorly early in the season, giving up nine earned runs in 5 1/3 innings in the month of April for an ERA of 15.19. He began to hit his stride in late May and registered an American League record 16 consecutive wins from June 15 to August 25. He finished the regular season with a 24–8 record.

In the 1934 World Series against the St. Louis Cardinals' Gashouse Gang, Rowe was 1–1 in two starts with a 2.95 ERA. In Game 2, Rowe pitched a 12-inning complete game, allowing two earned runs and retiring 22 consecutive batters. In Game 6, Rowe pitched another complete game, allowing four runs, but Paul "Daffy" Dean held the Tigers to only three. Schoolboy finished fourth in the American League's 1934 Most Valuable Player voting behind teammates Mickey Cochrane, who won, and Charlie Gehringer.

==== "How'm I Doing, Edna?" ====
With his southern charm and eccentricities, Schoolboy Rowe became a fan favorite in Detroit. He was known as "a superstitious player who carried good-luck charms", including "a magical US Eagle ten-dollar coin" as well as "enchanted copper pieces from Belgium and The Netherlands, a fortunate black penny from Canada and a chipped but still powerful jade elephant from the Orient." He also avoided stepping on the chalk line while walking to and from the mound, always picked up his glove with his right hand and dropped it with his left hand, and even talked to the ball.

Rowe was loved particularly by female fans for his good looks and public devotion to his high-school sweetheart, Edna Mary Skinner. During a September 13, 1934, nationally broadcast interview on the popular Rudy Vallee radio show, Rowe asked his fiancee, "How'm I doing, Edna honey?" The line became famous and the incident endeared Schoolboy to women across the country, but led to relentless heckling from fans and opposing players, who enjoyed taunting him with his own words: "How'm I doing, Edna?"

During his 16-game win streak in 1934, a reporter asked him for his secret, and Schoolboy responded that he would "just eat a lot of vittles, climb on that mound, wrap my fingers around the ball and say to it, 'Edna, honey, let's go.'"

Prior to the 1934 World Series, the Detroit News brought Edna Skinner to Detroit to write about baseball, Schoolboy, cooking or whatever she pleased. Pictures of the pair posing with Babe Ruth were published in the newspapers as the nation became caught up in the courtship of Schoolboy and Skinner.

At the conclusion of the 1934 World Series, Rowe and Skinner were married on October 11, 1934, in a small ceremony in a suite at the Detroit Leland Hotel. Rowe's roommate Pete Fox and his wife were the attendants at the ceremony. When Rowe appeared the prior day at the County Building to secure his marriage license, he was met by a crowd of fans and reporters and was forced to seek refuge in the chambers of Judge Lester Moll. After securing the license, Rowe "strode through the mob" and caught a taxi.

=== World Series champion (1935) ===
Rowe had another strong year in 1935 as the Tigers won their second consecutive American League pennant. He finished the regular season with a record of 19–13 with 21 complete games and a league-leading six shutouts and was selected for the American League All-Star team. Rowe went 1–2 in the 1935 World Series despite a 2.51 ERA. He was the losing pitcher in the first game, a 3–0 Cubs victory, striking out eight batters, pitching a complete game and allowing only two earned runs. In Game 3, Rowe got the win, pitching four innings in relief. In Game 5, Rowe threw another complete game, allowing two earned runs as the Tigers lost 3–1. However, Detroit would go on to win Game 6 to clinch the World Series.

Rowe was known both for his powerful pitching and control. In the 1934 and 1935 seasons, he had 149 strikeouts (third in the AL) and 140 strikeouts (second in the AL), respectively. He also led the American League in strikeout-to-walk ratio in both 1934 and 1935 finishing in the top four in the league in bases on balls per 9 innings pitched seven times, including a career and league best 1.31 in 1943.

Rowe also contributed to the Tigers' success in 1934 and 1935 with his hitting. In 1934, he hit for a .303 batting average and had eight doubles, two home runs, and 22 RBIs in 109 at bats. In 1935, he raised his average to .312 with three home runs and 28 RBIs in 109 at bats. In his 15 seasons in the big leagues, Rowe hit 18 home runs (14th best in major league history for a pitcher) and 153 RBIs. His career batting average was .263 (239-for-909).

=== Middle years (1936–1939) ===
Rowe continued to pitch well in 1936, finishing with a 19–10 record. However, in 1937 and 1938 Rowe broke down and he was limited to 31 and 21 innings respectively before being sent down to the minor leagues.

In 1939, Rowe returned to the Tigers.

=== 16–3 and a World Series (1940) ===
Rowe got off to a strong start in 1940. In his first game of the season, he defeated Bob Feller and the Cleveland Indians, holding the Tribe to five hits and two runs in nine innings. Sports writer Charles P. Ward wrote that Rowe "was at his best" with "control and more than a little speed" and "looked more like the Rowe of 1934, 1935 and 1936 than he has in a long time." After missing three weeks in May, Rowe came back strongly. Between August 29 and September 21, as the Tigers battled with the Indians for the American League penant, Rowe won six consecutive games, including two complete game victories over the Indians. He finished the season with a 16–3 record in 27 games, leading the American League with an .842 winning percentage.

Rowe's comeback helped the Tigers win the 1940 pennant, and Rowe finished seventh in that year's American League Most Valuable Player voting (teammate Hank Greenberg won the award). In the 1940 World Series against the Cincinnati Reds, Rowe lost two games as he gave up seven earned runs in 3 2/3 innings pitched for an ERA of 17.18. In Game 2, he gave up five runs in 3 1/3 innings, and was pulled after retiring only one batter in the first inning of Game 6; the Tigers subsequently lost the series in seven games.

=== Three teams in three years (1941–1943) ===
Returning to the Tigers in 1941, Rowe appeared in 27 games, only 14 as a starter, compiling an 8–6 record with a 4.14 ERA. He appeared in two games for Detroit in April 1942, compiling a 1-0 record, and giving up no runs in 10 1/3 innings. After Rowe got his win against the Chicago White Sox on April 21, 1942, Chicago manager Jimmy Dykes said: "Rowe wasn't one-tenth as fast as he was eight years ago. I don't see how he got us out."

Rowe was sold to Brooklyn on April 30, 1942, for "a little more than the waiver price" after all teams in the American League granted waivers on him. He appeared in nine games for the Dodgers, mostly in relief, compiling a 1–0 record with a 5.34 ERA. Rowe was optioned to the Montreal Royals in August 1942. He appeared in three games for Montreal, compiling a 2–1 record with an impressive 2.05 ERA.

In March 1943, Montreal sold Rowe to the Philadelphia Phillies. Philadelphia manager Bucky Harris, who had managed Rowe as a rookie in 1933, said at the time:

I'll still take him and gladly. He can still pitch in my book. I am not going to say he is the same kind of a pitcher he was for me in Detroit, but he knows his stuff. He can't fire the ball up there with the zip it used to have, but it is still plenty fast. He is pitching with his head now, instead of his arm, and being a lot smarter than he was 10 years ago, he should make a good pitcher for us.

Despite playing for a team that compiled a 64–90 record, Rowe compiled an impressive 14–8 record with a 2.94 ERA in 27 games. He finished 14th in the 1943 National League MVP voting, higher than any other player on the Phillies club (Babe Dahlgren was 29th).

=== Navy service (1944–1945) ===
In January 1944, as World War II was being fought, Rowe passed a military physical and was assigned to the Navy. He missed the 1944 and 1945 seasons to service in the Navy. He was assigned to the Great Lakes Naval Training Station where his former manager, Mickey Cochrane, put together an All-Star baseball team that included Rowe, Bob Feller, Johnny Mize and Billy Herman. The 1944 Great Lakes team, sometimes called the "Seventeenth Major league club," compiled a 48–2 record, including an 11–1 record against major league teams. Rowe played as an outfielder as well as a pitcher and led the Great Lakes team with a .446 batting average.

In one memorable game in August 1944, Rowe hit a double, a triple, and a home run for the Great Lakes team, and the local newspaper reported that "...it was his circuit clout which brought deafening roars from the 6,000 park customers. The 'Schoolboy' teed off on one of (Gerard) 'Slim' DeLion's slow curves and drove the horsehide straight over the center field fence, a tremendous wallop of at least 450 feet."

In September 1944, the Army and Navy staged a military service World Series in Hawaii, billed by locals as the "real World Series", because so many of the best players in baseball were in the service. Rowe pitched for the Navy team that also included Dom DiMaggio and Phil Rizzuto. Admiral Nimitz threw out the first pitch, and Rowe's Navy team swept the first six games and finally won eight while losing two and tying one.

Rowe was discharged from the Navy at the Memphis naval station in November 1945. He said he planned to return to Arkansas for the winter and report to the Phillies in the spring.

=== Philadelphia Phillies (1946–1949) ===
Rowe returned to the Phillies in 1946, after playing only 18 games during his two years in the Navy. Rowe came back strong, compiling an 11–4 record (.733 winning percentage) in 17 games with a career-low 2.12 ERA. Rowe no longer had the "crackling fast ball", instead learning to "get smart". He noted: "I can't control that fast one all afternoon any more, but I sure can get that dancing stuff over the plate." After watching Rowe throw a three-hitter against Pittsburgh, Pie Traynor said that Rowe was "looking like the best righthander in the league." Rowe's comeback was cut short in early August when he tore a muscle in his right leg while trying to field a ground ball and was carried to the clubhouse on a stretcher. Despite the injury, the Phillies held a "Schoolboy Rowe" night on September 10, 1946, and a local businessmen's association presented Rowe with a new automobile for being "adjudged the standout player in Philadelphia this year."

After a month-long holdout, Rowe signed a new contract with the Phillies in February 1947. By mid-June, Rowe had compiled an 8–1 record, and he was selected to play on the National League All-Star team. On the day before the All-Star game, held in Chicago, was knocked unconscious in a train crash near Chicago's Grand Central Station. Rowe's performance declined in the second half of the season, and he finished with a 14–10 record, as his ERA doubled over the prior year to 4.32. During the 1947 season, he also became the first and only pitcher in major league history to be intentionally walked twice in the same game.

Prior to the 1948 season, Rowe expressed his desire to go through an entire season without an injury. He noted:

I never have gone through an entire season without getting hurt one way or another. I've had something happen to me since I first bgan playing professional baseball with Beaumont in 1932. . . . I have been laid up with sore arms, pulled shoulder muscles, groin, back, leg and thigh injuries and I also had arthritis. This year I'm keeping my fingers crossed.

Rowe appeared in 30 games in 1948, 20 as a starter, compiling a 10–10 with a 4.07 ERA. However, his hope for an injury-free season was unfulfilled. Rowe's left thumb was broken on May 5 while trying to knock down "a vicious drive" off the bat of Peanuts Lowrey. As a result of the injury, Rowe became the second player in major league history (after Pete Gray in 1945) to bat one-handed. Against the advice of doctors, Rowe returned to action on May 26 with a big plaster cast on his left thumb. He pitched 2 1/3 innings, giving up only two scattered hits. When he came to the plate in the eighth inning, Rowe ignored manager Ben Chapman's order to take three strikes and sit down, instead swinging the bat with his right hand and pounding a line drive into left field for a single. During his stint as a one-handed batter, Rowe had three hits in five at bats "and was robbed of another blow by a great piece of defensive work."

In 1949, he was used primarily as a relief pitcher, appearing in six games as a starter and 17 games in relief, while tallying a losing record of 3–7 with a 4.82 ERA. He appeared in his last major league game on September 13, 1949. He was unconditionally released by the Phillies in October 1949.

=== Major league career statistics ===
In 14 seasons in Major League Baseball, Rowe compiled a 158–101 record (.610) with 913 strikeouts and a 3.87 ERA in 382 games. At the plate, he had a .263 career batting average and a .328 on-base percentage with 18 home runs, 36 doubles, nine triples, and 153 RBIs.

=== Return to minors ===
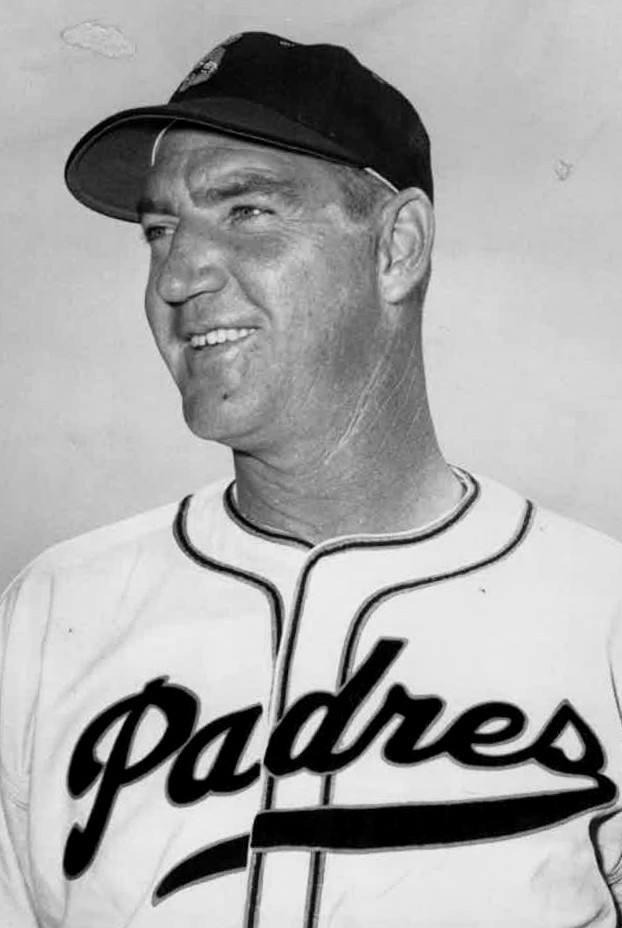
Rowe with San Diego Padres (PCL), 1950

Rowe became a free agent after the 1949 season. In December 1949, he signed a one-year contract with the San Diego Padres of the Pacific Coast League. Del Baker, who had been Rowe's manager in Detroit, was then serving as manager of the Padres. After compiling a record of no wins, four defeats, and a 6.47 ERA, Rowe was released by San Diego on June 16, 1950.

On June 23, 1950, Rowe was signed by the Shreveport Sports of the Texas League. Rowe compiled an 8–3 record for Shreveport with a 1.59 ERA.

=== Coaching and scouting ===
In February 1951, Rowe returned to the Detroit Tigers organization, signing as a player-manager for the Williamsport Tigers, the Tigers' Class A farm team in Williamsport, Pennsylvania. He led the 1951 Williamsport club to a 55–84 record as manager and compiled a 6–3 record with a 3.04 ERA as a pitcher.

After his playing career ended, Rowe spent the 1952 and 1953 seasons as a roving minor league pitching coach and scout for the Tigers.

During the 1954 and 1955 seasons, Rowe was the Tigers' pitching coach and later first base coach. During this time, after the Tigers made the third out, Rowe would pick up the baseball, then hand or toss it to the Tiger pitchers as they came out of the dugout to go to the mound. He did this to each except Ned Garver, who superstitiously preferred to pick the ball up off the ground.

Later, Rowe worked as a Tigers scout assigned to cover Arkansas, Louisiana, Mississippi, and East Texas. In March 1957, while helping as an instructor at the Tigers' spring training camp in Lakeland, Florida, Rowe had a heart attack. He continued scouting for the Tigers in 1957, and in December 1957, he was named manager of the Montgomery Rebels, He resigned as manager in late May 1958, for health reasons, and returned to scouting duties for the Tigers in Southern states.

== Family and death ==
Rowe and his wife, Edna, had a son, Lynwood Hugh Rowe (1935-1988) and a daughter, Josephine (born c. 1939).

Rowe sustained a second heart attack at his home in El Dorado, Arkansas, in January 1961. The second heart attack was fatal. At the time of his death, records were in conflict as to whether Rowe was age 48, 50, or 51. He was buried at Arlington Cemetery in El Dorado.

Rowe was inducted into the Michigan Sports Hall of Fame in May 1961, several months after he died. Rowe's widow, Edna (of "How'm I doin' Edna" fame), accepted the honor at the induction ceremony.

== See also ==
- List of Major League Baseball all-time leaders in home runs by pitchers
