= Pinky Higgins =

American baseball player and manager (1909–1969)

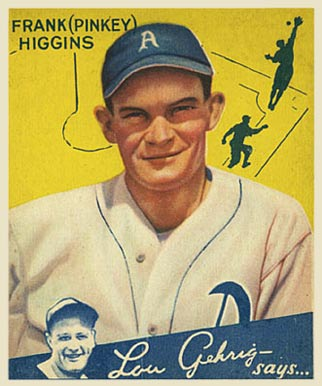
- Third baseman / Manager
- Born: May 27, 1909; Red Oak, Texas, U.S.
- Died: March 21, 1969 (aged 59); Dallas, Texas, U.S.
- Batted: Right Threw: Right

MLB debut
- June 25, 1930, for the Philadelphia Athletics

Last MLB appearance
- September 29, 1946, for the Boston Red Sox

MLB statistics
- Batting average: .292
- Home runs: 140
- Runs batted in: 1,075
- Managerial record: 560–556
- Winning %: .502
- Stats at Baseball Reference
- Managerial record at Baseball Reference

Teams
- As player: Philadelphia Athletics (1930, 1933–1936); Boston Red Sox (1937–1938); Detroit Tigers (1939–1944, 1946); Boston Red Sox (1946); As manager: Boston Red Sox (1955–1959, 1960–1962)

Career highlights and awards
- 3× All-Star (1934, 1936, 1944)

Michael Franklin "Pinky" Higgins (May 27, 1909 – March 21, 1969) was an American third baseman, manager, front office executive and scout in Major League Baseball who played for three teams and served as manager or general manager of the Boston Red Sox during the period of 1955 through 1965. During his playing days, he batted and threw right-handed, and was listed as 6 feet 1 inch (1.85 m) tall and 185 pounds (84 kg).

== Playing career ==
Higgins was born in Red Oak, Texas. He was nicknamed "Pinky" as a baby, and according to some reports detested it. Alternatively, he was called by either of his given names. He signed some autographs as Frank Higgins, but was predominantly known as Mike, especially later in his career. Higgins graduated from W. H. Adamson High School in Dallas, where he played on the 1926 state championship runner-up team. He attended the University of Texas at Austin before beginning his career with the Philadelphia Athletics on June 25, 1930. After only 24 at bats that year, he did not play in the majors again until 1933, when he began to play full-time for the A's. In his rookie season of 1933, he batted .314 with 13 home runs and 99 RBIs. He hit for the cycle on August 6 in a 12–8 win over the Washington Senators. The A's of that year finished third in the American League.

In December 1936, he was traded to the Boston Red Sox for fellow third baseman Billy Werber. He was not only considered one of the better-hitting third basemen in the league but led them in batting average in 1933 and 1934. In his first two years with the Bosox (1937 and 1938), he hit over .300 with a career-high 106 RBIs in both years. In June 1938, he set (and still holds) a major league record with base hits in 12 consecutive at bats, accomplishing the feat over 14 plate appearances because he also received two bases on balls during that streak. His mark was tied by Walt Dropo in 1952, who made his 12 straight knocks in 12 appearances, with no bases on balls in between.

He would next head to the Detroit Tigers in a trade for submarine pitcher Elden Auker, where he would spend the majority of his playing career. It was also where his hitting numbers dropped while his power numbers still stayed fairly strong, but not in the same realm as his career-high of 23 homers with Philadelphia in 1935.

Boston got Higgins back in mid-1946 as the team's regular third baseman, winning the AL pennant by 12 games (but losing the 1946 World Series to the Cardinals in seven). The Red Sox then released him, and he retired to become a manager in the Red Sox farm system. His final numbers included a .292 batting average with 140 home runs and 1,075 RBIs in 1,802 games. He accumulated 1,941 career hits in 6,636 at bats, with 931 runs, 374 doubles, 51 triples, 61 stolen bases and 800 bases on balls and made the All-Star team three times (1934, '36, '44).

=== Postseason ===
Higgins played in two World Series: one with Detroit in 1940 and one with Boston in 1946, losing both in seven but amassing a .271 Series batting average with 1 home run (for Detroit), 8 RBIs (6 for Detroit and 2 for Boston) and 13 hits in 48 at bats.

== Managing and front office career ==
=== Manager ===
Higgins started his managing career with the Class B Roanoke Red Sox of the Piedmont League in the Red Sox farm system in 1947. After eight seasons of managing in the minors—including four (1951–1954) at the helm of the Red Sox' Triple-A affiliate, the Louisville Colonels of the American Association—he became Boston's skipper in 1955. Before taking the Red Sox promotion, he was under consideration as manager-in-waiting for the Baltimore Orioles, where fellow Texan and former Tiger teammate Paul Richards had just been installed as the O's general manager and field manager in September 1954.

Higgins' first team saw a hot July and August but a September debacle and a fourth-place finish. Although he had winning first-division teams through 1958 and Ted Williams won two more batting titles (1957–58), the Red Sox never seriously contended—never finishing less than 12 games in arrears of the first-place New York Yankees. In 1959, with the 40-year-old Williams injured (and turning in the only sub-.300 season of his career), the Red Sox lost 42 of their first 73 games, and on July 3, Higgins was replaced as manager by Billy Jurges, a coach with the Washington Senators (and former star shortstop of the Cubs in the 1930s). However, Higgins stayed in the organization as special assistant to Bosox owner Tom Yawkey, a personal friend.

After a promising end to the 1959 season, Jurges' Red Sox plummeted into last place in the opening weeks of the 1960 campaign. Jurges was fired on June 10, 1960. Then, after coach Del Baker handled the Red Sox for seven games, Higgins was re-installed as manager, but the pitching-poor Red Sox continued to lose. Nonetheless, on September 30, 1960, he was signed to a three-year contract extension as field manager and given control of all player personnel in the Boston organization—effectively adding the responsibilities of general manager (without the formal title) to his managerial role.

He hung up his uniform and joined Boston's front office full-time as executive vice president and general manager after the 1962 campaign, finishing his managerial career with a record of 560–556 (.502) in 1,119 games. He was the second-winningest manager in Red Sox history until Terry Francona passed him in 2009. His best finish was third place, in 1957 and 1958, although his best winning percentage was achieved in both 1955 and 1956 with 84–70 (.545) fourth-place finishes.

He was 53 when he retired from managing. As a skipper, Higgins was known for being well liked by players and very easygoing. He would not go out to the mound to talk to his pitcher very often and in fact once said, "I don't believe in that business of walking out to the mound every time a pitcher's in trouble. You can't tell him anything new."

=== General manager ===
Higgins' record as a general manager, like his managing record, was mediocre. During the 1960 offseason, he traded 6 ft 6½ -in (1.99 m) starting pitcher Frank Sullivan to the Philadelphia Phillies for another tall right-hander, 6 ft 8 in (2.03 m) Gene Conley, who was also Bill Russell's backup center for the Boston Celtics; Conley would give Higgins two healthy seasons and win 15 games in 1962. But apart from swapping shortstops with Paul Richards' Houston Colt .45s, acquiring Eddie Bressoud for Don Buddin, Higgins made no other significant trades during the remainder of his two-year (1961–62) tenure as both manager and supervisor of playing personnel.

Once he was named full-time general manager, in the autumn of 1962, he did make a few major trades, one of them netting slugger Dick Stuart from the Pittsburgh Pirates, but they did not materially improve the club on the field. He made no further major deals until after the 1964 campaign, when he sent Stuart to the Phillies for left-handed starting pitcher Dennis Bennett, who suffered from a sore arm and would win only 12 games (losing 13) in 286 1/3 innings over 2 1/2 seasons in a Boston uniform. Higgins also clashed with his managerial successor, Johnny Pesky, who had been personally chosen by Yawkey. By the end of the 1964 season, Higgins had pushed Pesky aside, replacing him with his own man, Billy Herman.

The Red Sox continued to struggle at the major-league level, and in 1965 they lost 100 games for the only time during the Yawkey era for lack of pitching. But meanwhile, in their farm system directed by Neil Mahoney, they were amassing talented young players (including African-American players such as outfielder Reggie Smith, first baseman George Scott and third baseman Joe Foy) who would lead them to an improbable AL pennant in 1967, aided and abetted by 22-game winner Jim Lonborg and Triple Crown winner Carl Yastrzemski.

Higgins, however, was finally ousted by Yawkey on September 16, 1965, ironically the same day 21-year-old Boston righthander Dave Morehead threw a no-hitter. He then joined Houston as a scout, hired by old friend and teammate Richards. It would be his last job in baseball.

=== Racism ===
Red Sox historians often single out Higgins, along with Yawkey, when they discuss the root of the club's reputation for resisting racial integration. The Red Sox were the last (in 1959) of the then 16 major league teams to play a black player and fielded an all-white team from Jackie Robinson's Brooklyn Dodger debut in 1947 through Higgins' first managerial term. He was quoted by one Boston baseball writer, Al Hirshberg, as saying, "There'll be no niggers on this ball club as long as I have anything to say about it." He also reportedly called sportswriter Cliff Keane "a fucking nigger-lover" after hearing Keane praise the talents of White Sox outfielder Minnie Miñoso, a Cuban of African descent. The Red Sox' first African American player, utility infielder Pumpsie Green, was recalled from the minor leagues in July 1959, during Jurges' brief tenure as pilot. But Higgins had no control over the big league roster until he became Red Sox manager in 1955, and the club's policy of refusing to break the color line appeared to be in place well before then under Yawkey and his front office bosses, Eddie Collins and Joe Cronin.

When Higgins returned to his managerial post and then assumed player personnel responsibilities, from mid-1960 through late in 1965, he oversaw an integrated roster and acquired a few nonwhite players (outfielders Román Mejías, Lenny Green, Al Smith and Willie Tasby and infielders Green, Billy Harrell and Félix Mantilla). Tasby was enthusiastic about playing for Higgins when he was quoted in a Boston newspaper in late 1960. But Tasby spent only a half-year with the Red Sox before he was unprotected in the 1960 Major League Baseball expansion draft, then selected by the "new" Washington Senators.

== Managerial record ==
Team	Year	Regular season					Postseason			
Team	Year	Games	Won	Lost	Win %	Finish	Won	Lost	Win %	Result
BOS	1955	154	84	70	.545	4th in AL	–	–	–	–
BOS	1956	154	84	70	.545	4th in AL	–	–	–	–
BOS	1957	154	82	72	.532	3rd in AL	–	–	–	–
BOS	1958	154	79	75	.513	3rd in AL	–	–	–	–
BOS	1959	73	31	42	.425	reassigned position	–	–	–	–
BOS	1960	105	48	57	.457	7th in AL	–	–	–	–
BOS	1961	162	76	86	.469	6th in AL	–	–	–	–
BOS	1962	160	76	84	.475	8th in AL	–	–	–	–
Total		1116	560	556	.502		0	0	–	

== Death ==
In February 1968, Higgins was arrested after killing one and injuring three others with his car. He suffered two heart attacks between conviction and sentencing. He pled guilty to driving while drunk and was sentenced to four years, but was paroled after serving only two months. The day after he was paroled, he died of a heart attack in Dallas at the age of 59.

== See also ==
- List of Major League Baseball career runs batted in leaders
- List of Major League Baseball players to hit for the cycle

Achievements
Preceded by Mickey Cochrane	Hitting for the cycle August 6, 1933	Succeeded by Jimmie Foxx
