= 1941 Detroit Tigers season =

Major League Baseball season

1941 Detroit Tigers
- League: American League
- Ballpark: Briggs Stadium
- City: Detroit
- Record: 75–79 (.487)
- League place: T–4th
- Owners: Walter Briggs, Sr.
- General managers: Jack Zeller
- Managers: Del Baker
- Radio: WWJ (AM) (Ty Tyson); WXYZ (Harry Heilmann)

The 1941 Detroit Tigers season was a season in American baseball. The team finished tied for fourth in the American League with a record of 75–79, 26 games behind the New York Yankees.

== Regular season ==
=== Season standings ===
American League
Team	W	L	Pct.	GB	Home	Road
New York Yankees	101	53	.656	—	51‍–‍26	50‍–‍27
Boston Red Sox	84	70	.545	17	47‍–‍30	37‍–‍40
Chicago White Sox	77	77	.500	24	38‍–‍39	39‍–‍38
Cleveland Indians	75	79	.487	26	42‍–‍35	33‍–‍44
Detroit Tigers	75	79	.487	26	43‍–‍34	32‍–‍45
St. Louis Browns	70	84	.455	31	40‍–‍37	30‍–‍47
Washington Senators	70	84	.455	31	40‍–‍37	30‍–‍47
Philadelphia Athletics	64	90	.416	37	36‍–‍41	28‍–‍49

=== Record vs. opponents ===
1941 American League record Sources:
Team	BOS	CWS	CLE	DET	NYY	PHA	SLB	WSH
Boston	—	16–6	9–13	11–11	9–13–1	16–6	9–13	14–8
Chicago	6–16	—	17–5	12–10–1	8–14	10–12	11–11–1	13–9
Cleveland	13–9	5–17	—	10–12	7–15	15–7	13–9–1	12–10
Detroit	11–11	10–12–1	12–10	—	11–11	13–9	11–11	7–15
New York	13–9–1	14–8	15–7	11–11	—	14–8	18–4	16–6–1
Philadelphia	6–16	12–10	7–15	9–13	8–14	—	11–11	11–11
St. Louis	13–9	11–11–1	9–13–1	11–11	4–18	11–11	—	11–11–1
Washington	8–14	9–13	10–12	15–7	6–16–1	11–11	11–11–1	—

=== Notable transactions ===
- May 5, 1941: Rip Radcliff was purchased by the Tigers from the St. Louis Browns for $25,000.

=== Roster ===
1941 Detroit Tigers
Roster
Pitchers: 19 Al Benton; 10 Tommy Bridges; -- Earl Cook; 17 Floyd Giebell; 15 Johnny Gorsica; 24 Hal Manders; 28 Archie McKain; 27 Les Mueller; 16 Hal Newhouser; 12 Bobo Newsom; 14 Schoolboy Rowe; 22 Bud Thomas; 11 Dizzy Trout; -- Virgil Trucks; 25 Hal White	Catchers: 8 Billy Sullivan; 1 Birdie Tebbetts; Infielders: 7 Dick Bartell; 3 Frank Croucher; 28 Moe Franklin; 2 Charlie Gehringer; 6 Pinky Higgins; 9 Eric McNair; 9 L. D. Meyer; 7 Boyd Perry; 4 Rudy York	Outfielders: 20 Bruce Campbell; -- Hoot Evers; 5 Hank Greenberg; 24 Ned Harris; 21 Barney McCosky; 27 Pat Mullin; -- Bob Patrick; 18 Rip Radcliff; 23 Tuck Stainback; 24 Dick Wakefield; Other batters: 29 Fred Hutchinson	Manager: 32 Del Baker; Coaches: 31 Bing Miller; 33 Steve O'Neill; 30 Merv Shea

== Player stats ==
= Indicates team leader

=== Batting ===
==== Starters by position ====
Note: Pos = Position; G = Games played; AB = At bats; H = Hits; Avg. = Batting average; HR = Home runs; RBI = Runs batted in

Pos	Player	G	AB	H	Avg.	HR	RBI
C	Birdie Tebbetts	110	359	102	.284	2	47
1B	Rudy York	155	590	153	.259	27	111
2B	Charlie Gehringer	127	436	96	.220	3	46
SS	Frank Croucher	136	489	124	.254	2	39
3B	Pinky Higgins	147	540	161	.298	11	73
OF	Bruce Campbell	141	512	141	.275	15	93
OF	Rip Radcliff	96	379	120	.317	3	40
OF	Barney McCosky	127	494	160	.324	3	55

==== Other batters ====
Note: G = Games played; AB = At bats; H = Hits; Avg. = Batting average; HR = Home runs; RBI = Runs batted in

Player	G	AB	H	Avg.	HR	RBI
Billy Sullivan	85	234	66	.282	3	29
Pat Mullin	54	220	76	.345	5	23
Tuck Stainback	94	200	49	.245	2	10
L.D. Meyer	46	153	29	.190	1	14
Boyd Perry	36	83	15	.181	0	11
Hank Greenberg	19	67	18	.269	2	12
Ned Harris	26	61	13	.213	1	4
Eric McNair	23	59	11	.186	0	3
Dick Bartell	5	12	2	.167	0	1
Moe Franklin	13	10	3	.300	0	0
Bob Patrick	5	7	2	.286	0	0
Dick Wakefield	7	7	1	.143	0	0
Hoot Evers	1	4	0	.000	0	0
Fred Hutchinson	2	2	0	.000	0	0

=== Pitching ===
= Indicates league leader

==== Starting pitchers ====
Note: G = Games pitched; IP = Innings pitched; W = Wins; L = Losses; ERA = Earned run average; SO = Strikeouts

Player	G	IP	W	L	ERA	SO
Bobo Newsom	43	250.1	12	20	4.60	175
Hal Newhouser	33	173.0	9	11	4.79	106
Tommy Bridges	25	147.2	9	12	3.41	90

==== Other pitchers ====
Note: G = Games pitched; IP = Innings pitched; W = Wins; L = Losses; ERA = Earned run average; SO = Strikeouts

Player	G	IP	W	L	ERA	SO
Johnny Gorsica	33	171.0	9	11	4.47	59
Al Benton	38	157.2	15	6	2.97	63
Dizzy Trout	37	151.2	9	9	3.74	88
Schoolboy Rowe	27	139.0	8	6	4.14	54

==== Relief pitchers ====
Note: G = Games pitched; W = Wins; L = Losses; SV = Saves; ERA = Earned run average; SO = Strikeouts

Player	G	W	L	SV	ERA	SO
Bud Thomas	26	1	3	2	4.21	17
Floyd Giebell	17	0	0	0	6.03	10
Archie McKain	15	2	1	0	5.02	14
Hal Manders	8	1	0	0	2.35	7
Les Mueller	4	0	0	0	4.85	8
Hal White	4	0	0	0	6.00	2
Virgil Trucks	1	0	0	0	9.00	3
Earl Cook	1	0	0	0	4.50	1

== Farm system ==
Level	Team	League	Manager
AA	Buffalo Bisons	International League	Al Vincent
A1	Beaumont Exporters	Texas League	Gordie Hinkle
A	Elmira Pioneers	Eastern League	Ray Brubaker
B	Hagerstown Owls	Interstate League	Dutch Dorman
B	Winston-Salem Twins	Piedmont League	Jake Atz
C	Utica Braves	Canadian–American League	Frank Zubik
C	Texarkana Twins	Cotton States League	Walter Kopp and Jake Atz, Jr.
C	Muskegon Reds	Michigan State League	Jack Tighe
D	Tallahassee Caps	Georgia–Florida League	Lance Richbourg
D	Fulton Tigers	KITTY League	Vince "Moon" Mullen
D	Jamestown Falcons	PONY League	Greg Mulleavy

LEAGUE CHAMPION: Elmira
