= 1942 Detroit Tigers season =

Major League Baseball season

1942 Detroit Tigers
- League: American League
- Ballpark: Briggs Stadium
- City: Detroit
- Record: 73–81 (.474)
- League place: 5th
- Owners: Walter Briggs, Sr.
- General managers: Jack Zeller
- Managers: Del Baker
- Radio: WWJ (AM) (Ty Tyson); WXYZ (Harry Heilmann)

The 1942 Detroit Tigers season was a season in American baseball. The team finished fifth in the American League with a record of 73–81, 30 games behind the New York Yankees.

== Offseason ==
- Prior to the 1942 season: Neil Berry was signed as an amateur free agent by the Tigers.

== Regular season ==
=== Season standings ===
American League
Team	W	L	Pct.	GB	Home	Road
New York Yankees	103	51	.669	—	58‍–‍19	45‍–‍32
Boston Red Sox	93	59	.612	9	53‍–‍24	40‍–‍35
St. Louis Browns	82	69	.543	19½	40‍–‍37	42‍–‍32
Cleveland Indians	75	79	.487	28	39‍–‍39	36‍–‍40
Detroit Tigers	73	81	.474	30	43‍–‍34	30‍–‍47
Chicago White Sox	66	82	.446	34	35‍–‍35	31‍–‍47
Washington Senators	62	89	.411	39½	35‍–‍42	27‍–‍47
Philadelphia Athletics	55	99	.357	48	25‍–‍51	30‍–‍48

=== Record vs. opponents ===
1942 American League record Sources:
Team	BOS	CWS	CLE	DET	NYY	PHA	SLB	WSH
Boston	—	13–8	14–8	15–7	12–10	14–8	11–11	14–7
Chicago	8–13	—	11–11	9–13	7–15	12–10	6–13	13–7
Cleveland	8–14	11–11	—	9–13–2	7–15	16–6	9–13	15–7
Detroit	7–15	13–9	13–9–2	—	7–15	13–9	11–11	9–13
New York	10–12	15–7	15–7	15–7	—	16–6	15–7	17–5
Philadelphia	8–14	10–12	6–16	9–13	6–16	—	6–16	10–12
St. Louis	11–11	13–6	13–9	11–11	7–15	16–6	—	11–11
Washington	7–14	7–13	7–15	13–9	5–17	12–10	11–11	—

=== Notable transactions ===
- April 30, 1942: Schoolboy Rowe was purchased from the Tigers by the Brooklyn Dodgers.

=== Roster ===
1942 Detroit Tigers
Roster
Pitchers: 19 Al Benton; 10 Tommy Bridges; 17 Charlie Fuchs; 15 Johnny Gorsica; 18 Roy Henshaw; 12 Hal Manders; 16 Hal Newhouser; 14 Schoolboy Rowe; 11 Dizzy Trout; 22 Virgil Trucks; 25 Hal White; 24 Jack Wilson	Catchers: 23 Dixie Parsons; 9 Hank Riebe; 1 Birdie Tebbetts; 31 Al Unser; Infielders: 3 Jimmy Bloodworth; 27 Moe Franklin; 2,22 Charlie Gehringer; 6 Pinky Higgins; 7 Billy Hitchcock; 7 Johnny Lipon; 9 Eric McNair; 26 Dutch Meyer; 4 Rudy York	Outfielders: 8 Doc Cramer; 28,26 Ned Harris; 21 Barney McCosky; 24 Bob Patrick; 5 Rip Radcliff; 20 Don Ross	Manager: 32 Del Baker; Coaches: 2 Charlie Gehringer; 30 Merv Shea; 31 Jack Tighe

== Player stats ==
= Indicates team leader

=== Batting ===
==== Starters by position ====
Note: Pos = Position; G = Games played; AB = At bats; H = Hits; Avg. = Batting average; HR = Home runs; RBI = Runs batted in

Pos	Player	G	AB	H	Avg.	HR	RBI
C	Birdie Tebbetts	99	308	76	.247	1	27
1B	Rudy York	153	577	150	.260	21	90
2B	Jimmy Bloodworth	137	533	129	.242	13	57
SS	Billy Hitchcock	85	280	59	.211	0	29
3B	Pinky Higgins	143	499	133	.267	11	79
OF	Doc Cramer	151	630	166	.263	0	43
OF	Barney McCosky	154	600	176	.293	7	50
OF	Ned Harris	121	398	108	.271	9	45

==== Other batters ====
Note: G = Games played; AB = At bats; H = Hits; Avg. = Batting average; HR = Home runs; RBI = Runs batted in

Player	G	AB	H	Avg.	HR	RBI
Don Ross	87	226	62	.274	3	30
Dixie Parsons	63	188	37	.197	2	11
Moe Franklin	48	154	40	.260	2	16
Rip Radcliff	62	144	36	.250	1	20
Johnny Lipon	34	131	25	.191	0	9
Eric McNair	26	68	11	.162	1	4
Dutch Meyer	14	52	17	.327	2	9
Charlie Gehringer	45	45	12	.267	1	7
Hank Riebe	11	35	11	.314	0	2
Al Unser	4	8	3	.375	0	0
Bob Patrick	4	8	2	.250	1	3

=== Pitching ===
==== Starting pitchers ====
Note: G = Games pitched; IP = Innings pitched; W = Wins; L = Losses; ERA = Earned run average; SO = Strikeouts

Player	G	IP	W	L	ERA	SO
Al Benton	35	226.2	7	13	2.90	110
Dizzy Trout	35	223.0	12	18	3.43	91
Hal White	34	216.2	12	12	2.91	93
Tommy Bridges	23	174.0	9	7	2.74	97
Virgil Trucks	28	167.2	14	8	2.74	91

==== Other pitchers ====
Note: G = Games pitched; IP = Innings pitched; W = Wins; L = Losses; ERA = Earned run average; SO = Strikeouts

Player	G	IP	W	L	ERA	SO
Hal Newhouser	38	183.2	8	14	2.45	103
Charlie Fuchs	9	36.2	3	3	6.63	15
Schoolboy Rowe	2	10.1	1	0	0.00	7

==== Relief pitchers ====
Note: G = Games pitched; W = Wins; L = Losses; SV = Saves; ERA = Earned run average; SO = Strikeouts

Player	G	W	L	SV	ERA	SO
Johnny Gorsica	28	3	2	4	4.75	19
Roy Henshaw	23	2	4	1	4.09	24
Hal Manders	18	2	0	0	4.09	14
Jack Wilson	9	0	0	0	4.85	7

== Farm system ==
Level	Team	League	Manager
AA	Buffalo Bisons	International League	Al Vincent
A1	Beaumont Exporters	Texas League	Steve O'Neill
A	Elmira Pioneers	Eastern League	Ray Brubaker
B	Hagerstown Owls	Interstate League	Dutch Dorman
B	Winston-Salem Twins	Piedmont League	Jack Tighe and Al Unser
C	Pittsfield Electrics	Canadian–American League	Shano Collins, Rabbit Moore and Vince "Moon" Mullen
D	Fulton Tigers	KITTY League	Vince "Moon" Mullen
D	Jamestown Falcons	PONY League	Greg Mulleavy

LEAGUE CHAMPIONS: Jamestown

KITTY League folded, June 19, 1942
