= 1942 Philadelphia Athletics season =

1942 Philadelphia Athletics
- League: American League
- Ballpark: Shibe Park
- City: Philadelphia
- Record: 55–99 (.357)
- League place: 8th
- Owners: Connie Mack
- Managers: Connie Mack
- Radio: WIBG (By Saam, Taylor Grant)

The 1942 Philadelphia Athletics season involved the A's finishing eighth in the American League with a record of 55 wins and 99 losses.

== Offseason ==
- November 26, 1941: Fred Chapman was traded by the Athletics to the Toronto Maple Leafs for Walter Klimczak (minors).
- December 9, 1941: Wally Moses was traded by the Athletics to the Chicago White Sox for Mike Kreevich and Jack Hallett.

== Regular season ==
=== Season standings ===
American League
| Team | W | L | Pct. | GB | Home | Road |
|---|---|---|---|---|---|---|
| New York Yankees | 103 | 51 | .669 | — | 58‍–‍19 | 45‍–‍32 |
| Boston Red Sox | 93 | 59 | .612 | 9 | 53‍–‍24 | 40‍–‍35 |
| St. Louis Browns | 82 | 69 | .543 | 19½ | 40‍–‍37 | 42‍–‍32 |
| Cleveland Indians | 75 | 79 | .487 | 28 | 39‍–‍39 | 36‍–‍40 |
| Detroit Tigers | 73 | 81 | .474 | 30 | 43‍–‍34 | 30‍–‍47 |
| Chicago White Sox | 66 | 82 | .446 | 34 | 35‍–‍35 | 31‍–‍47 |
| Washington Senators | 62 | 89 | .411 | 39½ | 35‍–‍42 | 27‍–‍47 |
| Philadelphia Athletics | 55 | 99 | .357 | 48 | 25‍–‍51 | 30‍–‍48 |

=== Record vs. opponents ===
1942 American League record Sources:
| Team | BOS | CWS | CLE | DET | NYY | PHA | SLB | WSH |
|---|---|---|---|---|---|---|---|---|
| Boston | — | 13–8 | 14–8 | 15–7 | 12–10 | 14–8 | 11–11 | 14–7 |
| Chicago | 8–13 | — | 11–11 | 9–13 | 7–15 | 12–10 | 6–13 | 13–7 |
| Cleveland | 8–14 | 11–11 | — | 9–13–2 | 7–15 | 16–6 | 9–13 | 15–7 |
| Detroit | 7–15 | 13–9 | 13–9–2 | — | 7–15 | 13–9 | 11–11 | 9–13 |
| New York | 10–12 | 15–7 | 15–7 | 15–7 | — | 16–6 | 15–7 | 17–5 |
| Philadelphia | 8–14 | 10–12 | 6–16 | 9–13 | 6–16 | — | 6–16 | 10–12 |
| St. Louis | 11–11 | 13–6 | 13–9 | 11–11 | 7–15 | 16–6 | — | 11–11 |
| Washington | 7–14 | 7–13 | 7–15 | 13–9 | 5–17 | 12–10 | 11–11 | — |

=== Notable transactions ===
- June 1, 1942: Frankie Hayes was traded by the Athletics to the St. Louis Browns for Bob Harris and Bob Swift.

=== Roster ===
1942 Philadelphia Athletics
Roster
| Pitchers: -- Tal Abernathy; 25 Bill Beckmann; 20 Herman Besse; 23 Fred Caligiuri; 24 Russ Christopher; -- Joe Coleman; 22,32 Dick Fowler; 25 Bob Harris; 18 Lum Harris; 35,45 Jack Knott; -- Sam Lowry; 19,21 Phil Marchildon; 29 Les McCrabb; 29 Bob Savage; 17 Tex Shirley; 30,36 Roger Wolff | Catchers: 34 Jim Castiglia; 8 Frankie Hayes; 8 Bob Swift; 9 Hal Wagner; 11 George Yankowski; Infielders: -- Dick Adkins; 6 Buddy Blair; 12 Crash Davis; 16 Larry Eschen; 2 Bill Knickerbocker; 11 Bruce Konopka; 14 Eric McNair; 5 Dick Siebert; 3 Pete Suder; 10 Jack Wallaesa | Outfielders: 14 Eddie Collins; 4 Bob Johnson; 1 Mike Kreevich; 19 Felix Mackiewicz; 7 Dee Miles; 11 Ken Richardson; 15 Elmer Valo | Manager: -- Connie Mack; Coaches: 33 Lena Blackburne; 26 Earle Brucker; 31 Dave Keefe; 27 Earle Mack; 28 Al Simmons |

== Player stats ==
| = Indicates team leader |

=== Batting ===
==== Starters by position ====
Note: Pos = Position; G = Games played; AB = At bats; H = Hits; Avg. = Batting average; HR = Home runs; RBI = Runs batted in

| Pos | Player | G | AB | H | Avg. | HR | RBI |
|---|---|---|---|---|---|---|---|
| C | Hal Wagner | 104 | 288 | 68 | .236 | 1 | 30 |
| 1B | Dick Siebert | 153 | 612 | 159 | .260 | 2 | 74 |
| 2B | Bill Knickerbocker | 87 | 289 | 73 | .253 | 1 | 19 |
| SS | Pete Suder | 128 | 476 | 122 | .256 | 4 | 54 |
| 3B | Buddy Blair | 137 | 484 | 135 | .279 | 5 | 66 |
| OF | Elmer Valo | 133 | 459 | 115 | .251 | 2 | 40 |
| OF | Mike Kreevich | 116 | 444 | 113 | .255 | 1 | 30 |
| OF | Bob Johnson | 149 | 550 | 160 | .291 | 13 | 80 |

==== Other batters ====
Note: G = Games played; AB = At bats; H = Hits; Avg. = Batting average; HR = Home runs; RBI = Runs batted in

| Player | G | AB | H | Avg. | HR | RBI |
|---|---|---|---|---|---|---|
| Dee Miles | 99 | 346 | 94 | .272 | 0 | 22 |
| Crash Davis | 86 | 272 | 61 | .224 | 2 | 26 |
| Bob Swift | 60 | 192 | 44 | .229 | 0 | 15 |
| Jack Wallaesa | 36 | 117 | 30 | .256 | 2 | 13 |
| Eric McNair | 34 | 103 | 25 | .243 | 0 | 4 |
| Frankie Hayes | 21 | 63 | 15 | .238 | 0 | 5 |
| Eddie Collins | 20 | 34 | 8 | .235 | 0 | 7 |
| Jim Castiglia | 16 | 18 | 7 | .389 | 0 | 2 |
| Ken Richardson | 6 | 15 | 1 | .067 | 0 | 0 |
| Felix Mackiewicz | 6 | 14 | 3 | .214 | 0 | 2 |
| George Yankowski | 6 | 13 | 2 | .154 | 0 | 2 |
| Larry Eschen | 12 | 11 | 0 | .000 | 0 | 0 |
| Bruce Konopka | 5 | 10 | 3 | .300 | 0 | 1 |
| Dick Adkins | 3 | 7 | 1 | .143 | 0 | 0 |

=== Pitching ===
==== Starting pitchers ====
Note: G = Games pitched; IP = Innings pitched; W = Wins; L = Losses; ERA = Earned run average; SO = Strikeouts

| Player | G | IP | W | L | ERA | SO |
|---|---|---|---|---|---|---|
| Phil Marchildon | 38 | 244.0 | 17 | 14 | 4.20 | 110 |
| Roger Wolff | 32 | 214.1 | 12 | 15 | 3.32 | 94 |
| Lum Harris | 26 | 166.0 | 11 | 15 | 3.74 | 60 |

==== Other pitchers ====
Note: G = Games pitched; IP = Innings pitched; W = Wins; L = Losses; ERA = Earned run average; SO = Strikeouts

| Player | G | IP | W | L | ERA | SO |
|---|---|---|---|---|---|---|
| Russ Christopher | 30 | 165.0 | 4 | 13 | 3.82 | 58 |
| Dick Fowler | 31 | 140.0 | 6 | 11 | 4.95 | 38 |
| Herman Besse | 30 | 133.0 | 2 | 9 | 6.16 | 78 |
| Jack Knott | 20 | 95.1 | 2 | 10 | 5.57 | 31 |
| Bob Harris | 16 | 78.0 | 1 | 5 | 2.88 | 26 |
| Bob Savage | 8 | 30.2 | 0 | 1 | 3.23 | 10 |
| Bill Beckmann | 5 | 20.1 | 0 | 1 | 7.08 | 10 |

==== Relief pitchers ====
Note: G = Games pitched; W = Wins; L = Losses; SV = Saves; ERA = Earned run average; SO = Strikeouts

| Player | G | W | L | SV | ERA | SO |
|---|---|---|---|---|---|---|
| Tex Shirley | 15 | 0 | 1 | 1 | 5.30 | 10 |
| Fred Caligiuri | 13 | 0 | 3 | 1 | 6.38 | 20 |
| Joe Coleman | 1 | 0 | 1 | 0 | 3.00 | 0 |
| Les McCrabb | 1 | 0 | 0 | 0 | 31.50 | 0 |
| Sam Lowry | 1 | 0 | 0 | 0 | 6.00 | 0 |
| Tal Abernathy | 1 | 0 | 0 | 0 | 10.12 | 1 |

== Farm system ==
| Level | Team | League | Manager |
|---|---|---|---|
| AA | Toronto Maple Leafs | International League | Burleigh Grimes |
| A | Williamsport Grays | Eastern League | Spencer Abbott |
| B | Wilmington Blue Rocks | Interstate League | Herb Brett |
| C | Newport News Builders | Virginia League | Harry Chozen |

LEAGUE CHAMPIONS: Wilmington
Toronto affiliation shared with Pittsburgh Pirates
