= 1942 St. Louis Browns season =

Major League Baseball season

1942 St. Louis Browns
- League: American League
- Ballpark: Sportsman's Park
- City: St. Louis, Missouri
- Record: 82–69 (.543)
- League place: 3rd
- Owners: Donald Lee Barnes
- General managers: Bill DeWitt
- Managers: Luke Sewell
- Radio: (Dizzy Dean, Johnny O'Hara)

The 1942 St. Louis Browns season involved the Browns finishing 3rd in the American League with a record of 82 wins and 69 losses.

== Regular season ==
=== Season standings ===
American League
Team	W	L	Pct.	GB	Home	Road
New York Yankees	103	51	.669	—	58‍–‍19	45‍–‍32
Boston Red Sox	93	59	.612	9	53‍–‍24	40‍–‍35
St. Louis Browns	82	69	.543	19½	40‍–‍37	42‍–‍32
Cleveland Indians	75	79	.487	28	39‍–‍39	36‍–‍40
Detroit Tigers	73	81	.474	30	43‍–‍34	30‍–‍47
Chicago White Sox	66	82	.446	34	35‍–‍35	31‍–‍47
Washington Senators	62	89	.411	39½	35‍–‍42	27‍–‍47
Philadelphia Athletics	55	99	.357	48	25‍–‍51	30‍–‍48

=== Record vs. opponents ===
1942 American League record Sources:
Team	BOS	CWS	CLE	DET	NYY	PHA	SLB	WSH
Boston	—	13–8	14–8	15–7	12–10	14–8	11–11	14–7
Chicago	8–13	—	11–11	9–13	7–15	12–10	6–13	13–7
Cleveland	8–14	11–11	—	9–13–2	7–15	16–6	9–13	15–7
Detroit	7–15	13–9	13–9–2	—	7–15	13–9	11–11	9–13
New York	10–12	15–7	15–7	15–7	—	16–6	15–7	17–5
Philadelphia	8–14	10–12	6–16	9–13	6–16	—	6–16	10–12
St. Louis	11–11	13–6	13–9	11–11	7–15	16–6	—	11–11
Washington	7–14	7–13	7–15	13–9	5–17	12–10	11–11	—

=== Notable transactions ===
- June 1, 1942: Bob Harris and Bob Swift were traded by the Browns to the Philadelphia Athletics for Frankie Hayes.
- June 1, 1942: Bill Trotter and Roy Cullenbine were traded by the Browns to the Washington Senators for Mike Chartak and Steve Sundra.

=== Roster ===
1942 St. Louis Browns
Roster
Pitchers: 26,27 Pete Appleton; 18 Elden Auker; 27 Frank Biscan; 16 George Caster; 19 Stan Ferens; 22 Denny Galehouse; 24 Loy Hanning; 20 Bob Harris; 25 Al Hollingsworth; 29 Bob Muncrief; 21 Johnny Niggeling; 23 Fritz Ostermueller; 23 Ewald Pyle; 17 Steve Sundra; 17 Bill Trotter; 26 John Whitehead	Catchers: 9 Rick Ferrell; 8 Frankie Hayes; 32 Luke Sewell; 8 Bob Swift; Infielders: 20 Johnny Berardino; 7 Harlond Clift; 4 Don Gutteridge; 1 Don Heffner; 3 George McQuinn; 5 Vern Stephens; 2 Alan Strange	Outfielders: 10 Mike Chartak; 14 Tony Criscola; 50 Roy Cullenbine; 12 Wally Judnich; 28 Chet Laabs; 15 Glenn McQuillen; Other batters: -- Babe Dahlgren; 10 Ray Hayworth	Manager: 32 Luke Sewell; Coaches: 33 Fred Hofmann; 34 Zack Taylor

== Player stats ==
= Indicates team leader

=== Batting ===
==== Starters by position ====
Note: Pos = Position; G = Games played; AB = At bats; H = Hits; Avg. = Batting average; HR = Home runs; RBI = Runs batted in

Pos	Player	G	AB	H	Avg.	HR	RBI
C	Rick Ferrell	99	273	61	.223	0	26
1B	George McQuinn	145	554	145	.262	12	78
2B	Don Gutteridge	147	616	157	.255	1	50
SS	Vern Stephens	145	575	169	.294	14	92
3B	Harlond Clift	143	541	148	.274	7	55
OF	Glenn McQuillen	100	339	96	.283	3	47
OF	Wally Judnich	132	457	143	.313	17	82
OF	Chet Laabs	144	520	143	.275	27	99

==== Other batters ====
Note: G = Games played; AB = At bats; H = Hits; Avg. = Batting average; HR = Home runs; RBI = Runs batted in

Player	G	AB	H	Avg.	HR	RBI
Mike Chartak	73	237	59	.249	9	43
Frankie Hayes	56	159	40	.252	2	17
Tony Criscola	91	158	47	.297	1	13
Roy Cullenbine	38	109	21	.193	2	14
Bob Swift	29	76	15	.197	1	8
Johnny Berardino	29	74	21	.284	1	10
Alan Strange	19	37	10	.270	0	5
Don Heffner	19	36	6	.167	0	3
Luke Sewell	6	12	1	.083	0	0
Babe Dahlgren	2	2	0	.000	0	0
Ray Hayworth	1	1	1	1.000	0	0

=== Pitching ===
==== Starting pitchers ====
Note: G = Games pitched; IP = Innings pitched; W = Wins; L = Losses; ERA = Earned run average; SO = Strikeouts

Player	G	IP	W	L	ERA	SO
Elden Auker	35	249.0	14	13	4.08	62
Johnny Niggeling	28	206.1	15	11	2.66	107
Denny Galehouse	32	192.1	12	12	3.60	75
Bob Muncrief	24	134.1	6	8	3.89	39
Steve Sundra	20	110.2	8	3	3.82	26
Bob Harris	6	33.2	1	5	5.61	9

==== Other pitchers ====
Note: G = Games pitched; IP = Innings pitched; W = Wins; L = Losses; ERA = Earned run average; SO = Strikeouts

Player	G	IP	W	L	ERA	SO
Al Hollingsworth	33	161.0	10	6	2.96	60
Stan Ferens	19	69.0	3	4	3.78	23
Fritz Ostermueller	10	43.2	3	1	3.71	21

==== Relief pitchers ====
Note: G = Games pitched; W = Wins; L = Losses; SV = Saves; ERA = Earned run average; SO = Strikeouts

Player	G	W	L	SV	ERA	SO
George Caster	39	8	2	5	2.81	34
Pete Appleton	14	1	1	2	2.96	12
Frank Biscan	11	0	1	1	2.33	10
Loy Hanning	11	1	1	0	7.79	9
John Whitehead	4	0	0	0	6.75	0
Bill Trotter	3	0	1	0	18.00	0
Ewald Pyle	2	0	0	0	6.75	1

== Farm system ==
Level	Team	League	Manager
AA	Toledo Mud Hens	American Association	Fred Haney
A1	San Antonio Missions	Texas League	Ralph Winegarner
B	Springfield Browns	Illinois–Indiana–Iowa League	Jimmy Adair
C	Gloversville-Johnstown Glovers	Canadian–American League	Bill Hornsby
D	Huntington Jewels	Mountain State League	Art Scharein
