= 1942 Washington Senators season =

1942 Washington Senators
- League: American League
- Ballpark: Griffith Stadium
- City: Washington, D.C.
- Record: 62–89 (.411)
- League place: 7th
- Owners: Clark Griffith, William Richardson and George H. Richardson
- Managers: Bucky Harris
- Radio: WJSV/WINX (Arch McDonald)

The 1942 Washington Senators won 62 games, lost 89, and finished in seventh place in the American League. They were managed by Bucky Harris and played home games at Griffith Stadium.

== Offseason ==
- December 13, 1941: Johnny Welaj and Ken Chase were traded by the Senators to the Boston Red Sox for Stan Spence and Jack Wilson.

== Regular season ==
=== Season standings ===
American League
Team	W	L	Pct.	GB	Home	Road
New York Yankees	103	51	.669	—	58‍–‍19	45‍–‍32
Boston Red Sox	93	59	.612	9	53‍–‍24	40‍–‍35
St. Louis Browns	82	69	.543	19½	40‍–‍37	42‍–‍32
Cleveland Indians	75	79	.487	28	39‍–‍39	36‍–‍40
Detroit Tigers	73	81	.474	30	43‍–‍34	30‍–‍47
Chicago White Sox	66	82	.446	34	35‍–‍35	31‍–‍47
Washington Senators	62	89	.411	39½	35‍–‍42	27‍–‍47
Philadelphia Athletics	55	99	.357	48	25‍–‍51	30‍–‍48

=== Record vs. opponents ===
1942 American League record Sources:
Team	BOS	CWS	CLE	DET	NYY	PHA	SLB	WSH
Boston	—	13–8	14–8	15–7	12–10	14–8	11–11	14–7
Chicago	8–13	—	11–11	9–13	7–15	12–10	6–13	13–7
Cleveland	8–14	11–11	—	9–13–2	7–15	16–6	9–13	15–7
Detroit	7–15	13–9	13–9–2	—	7–15	13–9	11–11	9–13
New York	10–12	15–7	15–7	15–7	—	16–6	15–7	17–5
Philadelphia	8–14	10–12	6–16	9–13	6–16	—	6–16	10–12
St. Louis	11–11	13–6	13–9	11–11	7–15	16–6	—	11–11
Washington	7–14	7–13	7–15	13–9	5–17	12–10	11–11	—

=== Notable transactions ===
- June 1, 1942: Mike Chartak and Steve Sundra were traded by the Senators to the St. Louis Browns for Bill Trotter and Roy Cullenbine.

=== Roster ===
1942 Washington Senators
Roster
Pitchers: -- Dewey Adkins; 19 Lou Bevil; 18 Alex Carrasquel; 31 Hardin Cathey; 15 Sid Hudson; 21 Bill Kennedy; 16 Dutch Leonard; 34 Walt Masterson; 21 Phil McCullough; 12 Bobo Newsom; 10,66 Ray Scarborough; 17 Steve Sundra; 17 Bill Trotter; 19 Jack Wilson; 11 Early Wynn; 20 Bill Zuber	Catchers: 8 Jake Early; 9 Al Evans; Infielders: 21 Ellis Clary; 7 Frank Croucher; 8 Bobby Estalella; 22 Stan Galle; 32 Chile Gómez; 6 Ray Hoffman; 23 Jimmy Pofahl; 6 Bob Repass; 32 John Sullivan; 5 Mickey Vernon	Outfielders: 3 Bruce Campbell; 1 George Case; -- Mike Chartak; 14 Roy Cullenbine; 34 Al Kvasnak; -- Gene Moore; 24 Roberto Ortiz; 2 Stan Spence	Manager: 28 Bucky Harris; Coaches: 29 Nick Altrock; 27 Benny Bengough; 25 Ossie Bluege; 26 Clyde Milan; -- George Uhle

== Player stats ==
= Indicates team leader

= Indicates league leader

=== Batting ===
==== Starters by position ====
Note: Pos = Position; G = Games played; AB = At bats; H = Hits; Avg. = Batting average; HR = Home runs; RBI = Runs batted in

Pos	Player	G	AB	H	Avg.	HR	RBI	SB
C	Jake Early	104	353	72	.204	3	46	0
1B	Mickey Vernon	151	621	168	.271	9	86	25
2B	Ellis Clary	76	240	66	.275	0	16	2
SS	John Sullivan	94	357	84	.235	0	42	2
3B	Bobby Estalella	133	429	119	.277	8	65	5
OF	Stan Spence	149	629	203	.323	4	79	5
OF	Bruce Campbell	122	378	105	.278	5	63	0
OF	George Case	125	513	164	.320	5	43	44

==== Other batters ====
Note: G = Games played; AB = At bats; H = Hits; Avg. = Batting average; HR = Home runs; RBI = Runs batted in

Player	G	AB	H	Avg.	HR	RBI
Jimmy Pofahl	84	283	59	.208	0	28
Bob Repass	81	259	62	.239	2	23
Roy Cullenbine	64	241	69	.286	2	35
Al Evans	74	223	51	.229	0	10
Mike Chartak	24	92	20	.217	1	8
Chile Gómez	25	73	14	.192	0	6
Frank Croucher	26	65	18	.277	0	5
Roberto Ortiz	20	42	7	.167	1	4
Ray Hoffman	7	19	1	.053	0	2
Stan Galle	13	18	2	.111	0	1
Al Kvasnak	5	11	2	.182	0	0
Gene Moore	1	2	0	.000	0	0

=== Pitching ===
= Indicates league leader

==== Starting pitchers ====
Note: G = Games pitched; IP = Innings pitched; W = Wins; L = Losses; ERA = Earned run average; SO = Strikeouts

Player	G	IP	W	L	ERA	SO
Sid Hudson	35	239.1	10	17	4.36	72
Bobo Newsom	30	213.2	11	17	4.93	113*
Early Wynn	30	190.0	10	16	5.12	58
Dutch Leonard	6	35.0	2	2	4.11	15
Dewey Adkins	1	6.1	0	0	9.95	3

- Tied with Tex Hughson (Boston)

==== Other pitchers ====
Note: G = Games pitched; IP = Innings pitched; W = Wins; L = Losses; ERA = Earned run average; SO = Strikeouts

Player	G	IP	W	L	ERA	SO
Alex Carrasquel	35	152.1	7	7	3.43	40
Walt Masterson	25	142.2	5	9	3.34	63
Bill Zuber	37	126.2	9	9	3.84	64
Ray Scarborough	17	63.1	2	1	4.12	16
Jack Wilson	12	42.0	1	4	6.64	18
Steve Sundra	6	33.2	1	3	5.61	5
Hardin Cathey	12	30.1	1	1	7.42	8
Bill Kennedy	8	18.0	0	1	8.00	4
Lou Bevil	4	9.2	0	1	6.52	2

==== Relief pitchers ====
Note: G = Games pitched; W = Wins; L = Losses; SV = Saves; ERA = Earned run average; SO = Strikeouts

Player	G	W	L	SV	ERA	SO
Bill Trotter	17	3	1	0	5.75	13
Phil McCullough	1	0	0	0	6.00	2

== Farm system ==
Level	Team	League	Manager
A1	Chattanooga Lookouts	Southern Association	Marv Olson
B	Charlotte Hornets	Piedmont League	Harry Smythe
D	Newport Canners	Appalachian League	Red Lucas
D	Orlando Senators	Florida East Coast League	Bob Overstreet

Newport club folded, June 26, 1942; Florida East Coast League folded, May 14
