= Bobby Estalella =

Bobby Estalella may refer to:

- Bobby Estalella (outfielder) (1911–1991), former Major League Baseball outfielder
- Bobby Estalella (catcher) (born 1974), former Major League Baseball catcher
