= Stan Ferens =

American baseball player

- Pitcher
- Born: March 5, 1915; Wendel, Pennsylvania, U.S.
- Died: October 7, 1994 (aged 79); Hempfield Township, Pennsylvania, U.S.
- Batted: Both Threw: Left

MLB debut
- June 10, 1942, for the St. Louis Browns

Last MLB appearance
- September 29, 1946, for the St. Louis Browns

MLB statistics
- Win–loss record: 5–13
- Earned run average: 4.18
- Strikeouts: 51
- Stats at Baseball Reference

Teams
- St. Louis Browns (1942, 1946)

Stanley Ferens (March 5, 1915 – October 7, 1994), nicknamed "Lefty", was an American professional baseball pitcher who appeared in 53 total games in Major League Baseball for the St. Louis Browns in 1942 and 1946. Born in Wendel, Pennsylvania, the southpaw was a switch-hitter who stood 5 feet 11 inches (1.80 m) and weighed 170 pounds (77 kg).

Ferens' pro career lasted from 1937 through 1947, although he missed the 1943–1945 seasons. Acquired by the American League Browns after he won 19 games and lost only five for the 1941 Columbus Foxes of the Sally League, he appeared in 19 games, 16 as a relief pitcher, for the 1942 Brownies, who finished in third place in the Junior Circuit with an 82–69 record. Ferens won three games, lost four and posted an earned run average of 3.78 in 69 innings pitched. In 1946, he returned to the Browns but was less effective, winning only two of 11 decisions with a mediocre 4.50 ERA in 88 innings. He returned to the minor leagues for the 1947 campaign before leaving baseball.

Over his two MLB seasons, Ferens won five games and lost 13, with a career earned run average of 4.18. He made only nine starts among his 53 appearances, but hurled two complete games. He had no career saves or shutouts. In his 157 career innings pitched, Ferens allowed 73 earned runs, 176 hits and 59 bases on balls; he struck out 51.
