= 1942 Cleveland Indians season =

1942 Cleveland Indians
- League: American League
- Ballpark: League Park; Cleveland Municipal Stadium
- City: Cleveland, Ohio
- Owners: Alva Bradley
- General managers: Roger Peckinpaugh
- Managers: Lou Boudreau
- Radio: WCLE · WHK (Jack Graney, Lew Henry)

The 1942 Cleveland Indians season was a season in American major league baseball. The team finished fourth in the American League with a record of 75–79–2.

== Offseason ==
- Prior to 1942 season: Grant Dunlap was acquired by the Indians from the Cincinnati Reds.

== Regular season ==
=== Season standings ===
American League
Team	W	L	Pct.	GB	Home	Road
New York Yankees	103	51	.669	—	58‍–‍19	45‍–‍32
Boston Red Sox	93	59	.612	9	53‍–‍24	40‍–‍35
St. Louis Browns	82	69	.543	19½	40‍–‍37	42‍–‍32
Cleveland Indians	75	79	.487	28	39‍–‍39	36‍–‍40
Detroit Tigers	73	81	.474	30	43‍–‍34	30‍–‍47
Chicago White Sox	66	82	.446	34	35‍–‍35	31‍–‍47
Washington Senators	62	89	.411	39½	35‍–‍42	27‍–‍47
Philadelphia Athletics	55	99	.357	48	25‍–‍51	30‍–‍48

=== Record vs. opponents ===
1942 American League record Sources:
Team	BOS	CWS	CLE	DET	NYY	PHA	SLB	WSH
Boston	—	13–8	14–8	15–7	12–10	14–8	11–11	14–7
Chicago	8–13	—	11–11	9–13	7–15	12–10	6–13	13–7
Cleveland	8–14	11–11	—	9–13–2	7–15	16–6	9–13	15–7
Detroit	7–15	13–9	13–9–2	—	7–15	13–9	11–11	9–13
New York	10–12	15–7	15–7	15–7	—	16–6	15–7	17–5
Philadelphia	8–14	10–12	6–16	9–13	6–16	—	6–16	10–12
St. Louis	11–11	13–6	13–9	11–11	7–15	16–6	—	11–11
Washington	7–14	7–13	7–15	13–9	5–17	12–10	11–11	—

=== Roster ===
1942 Cleveland Indians
Roster
Pitchers: 17 Jim Bagby; 21 Clint Brown; -- Paul Calvert; 7 Pete Center; 16 Chubby Dean; 10 Harry Eisenstat; 47 Red Embree; 38 Tom Ferrick; 36 Steve Gromek; 18 Mel Harder; 11 Joe Heving; 12 Vern Kennedy; 15 Joe Krakauskas; 20 Al Milnar; 35 Ray Poat; -- Allie Reynolds; 32 Al Smith	Catchers: 9 Otto Denning; 4 Gene Desautels; 40 Jim Hegan; 28 George Susce; Infielders: 5 Lou Boudreau; 23 Les Fleming; 1 Oscar Grimes; 8 Ken Keltner; 42 Bob Lemon; 6 Ray Mack; 3 Rusty Peters; 31 Eddie Robinson; 15 Ted Sepkowski	Outfielders: 33 Hank Edwards; 45 Fabian Gaffke; 24 Jeff Heath; 34 Oris Hockett; 14 Buster Mills; 22 Roy Weatherly	Manager: 5 Lou Boudreau; Coaches: 27 Ski Melillo; 26 Burt Shotton; 28 George Susce

== Player stats ==
= Indicates team leader

=== Batting ===
==== Starters by position ====
Note: Pos = Position; G = Games played; AB = At bats; H = Hits; Avg. = Batting average; HR = Home runs; RBI = Runs batted in

Pos	Player	G	AB	H	Avg.	HR	RBI
C	Otto Denning	91	214	45	.210	1	19
1B	Les Fleming	156	548	160	.292	14	82
2B	Ray Mack	143	481	108	.225	2	45
SS	Lou Boudreau	147	506	143	.283	2	58
3B	Ken Keltner	152	624	179	.287	6	78
OF	Oris Hockett	148	601	150	.250	7	48
OF	Jeff Heath	147	568	158	.278	10	76
OF	Roy Weatherly	128	473	122	.258	5	39

==== Other batters ====
Note: G = Games played; AB = At bats; H = Hits; Avg. = Batting average; HR = Home runs; RBI = Runs batted in

Player	G	AB	H	Avg.	HR	RBI
Buster Mills	80	195	54	.277	1	26
Jim Hegan	68	170	33	.194	0	11
Gene Desautels	62	162	40	.247	0	9
Oscar Grimes	51	84	15	.179	0	2
Fabian Gaffke	40	67	11	.164	0	3
Rusty Peters	34	58	13	.224	0	2
Hank Edwards	13	48	12	.250	0	7
Ted Sepkowski	5	10	1	.100	0	0
Eddie Robinson	8	8	1	.125	0	2
Bob Lemon	5	5	0	.000	0	0
George Susce	2	1	1	1.000	0	0

=== Pitching ===
==== Starting pitchers ====
Note: G = Games pitched; IP = Innings pitched; W = Wins; L = Losses; ERA = Earned run average; SO = Strikeouts

Player	G	IP	W	L	ERA	SO
Jim Bagby	38	270.2	17	9	2.96	54
Mel Harder	29	198.2	13	14	3.44	74
Chubby Dean	27	172.2	8	11	3.81	46
Al Smith	30	168.1	10	15	3.96	66
Al Milnar	28	157.0	6	8	4.13	35

==== Other pitchers ====
Note: G = Games pitched; IP = Innings pitched; W = Wins; L = Losses; ERA = Earned run average; SO = Strikeouts

Player	G	IP	W	L	ERA	SO
Red Embree	19	63.0	3	4	3.86	44
Steve Gromek	14	44.1	2	0	3.65	14
Ray Poat	4	18.1	1	3	5.40	8
Clint Brown	7	9.0	1	1	6.00	4
Joe Krakauskas	3	7.0	0	0	3.86	2
Allie Reynolds	2	5.0	0	0	0.00	2
Pete Center	1	3.1	0	0	16.20	0
Paul Calvert	1	2.0	0	0	0.00	2

==== Relief pitchers ====
Note: G = Games pitched; W = Wins; L = Losses; SV = Saves; ERA = Earned run average; SO = Strikeouts

Player	G	W	L	SV	ERA	SO
Tom Ferrick	31	3	2	3	1.99	28
Harry Eisenstat	29	2	1	2	2.45	19
Vern Kennedy	28	4	8	1	4.08	37
Joe Heving	27	5	3	3	4.86	13

== Awards and honors ==
All-Star Game

Jim Bagby, Pitcher

Lou Boudreau, Shortstop (starter)

Ken Keltner, Third baseman (starter)

== Farm system ==
Level	Team	League	Manager
AA	Baltimore Orioles	International League	Alphonse "Tommy" Thomas
A	Wilkes-Barre Barons	Eastern League	Earl Wolgamot
B	Cedar Rapids Raiders	Illinois–Indiana–Iowa League	Ollie Marquardt
C	Charleston Senators	Middle Atlantic League	Ed Hall
C	Wausau Timberjacks	Northern League	Wally Gilbert
D	Thomasville Tommies	North Carolina State League	Jim Gruzdis and Woody Mabry
D	Batavia Clippers	PONY League	Jack Sanford
D	Appleton Papermakers	Wisconsin State League	Ed Dancisak and Dutch Zwilling

LEAGUE CHAMPIONS: Cedar Rapids, Thomasville
