= George Yankowski =

American baseball player (1922–2020)

- Catcher
- Born: November 19, 1922; Cambridge, Massachusetts, U.S.
- Died: February 25, 2020 (aged 97); The Villages, Florida, U.S.
- Batted: Right Threw: Right

MLB debut
- August 17, 1942, for the Philadelphia Athletics

Last MLB appearance
- June 28, 1946, for the Chicago White Sox

MLB statistics
- Batting average: .161
- Home runs: 0
- Runs batted in: 4
- Stats at Baseball Reference

Teams
- Philadelphia Athletics (1942); Chicago White Sox (1946)

George Edward Yankowski (November 19, 1922 – February 25, 2020) was an American professional baseball player. He was born in Cambridge, Massachusetts, and attended Watertown High School in Watertown, MA. Yankowski played parts of two seasons in Major League Baseball, appearing in six games for the Philadelphia Athletics during the 1942 season and twelve games for the Chicago White Sox in 1946, primarily as a catcher.

Yankowski served in the United States Army as a sniper during World War II, including fighting in the Battle of the Bulge and became a recipient of the Bronze Star Medal and the Combat Infantryman Badge. He died on February 25, 2020, at the age of 97.
