= 1942 New York Yankees season =

Season for the Major League Baseball team the New York Yankees

1942 New York Yankees
- American League champions
- League: American League
- Ballpark: Yankee Stadium
- City: New York City
- Record: 103–51 (.669)
- League place: 1st
- Owners: Estate of Jacob Ruppert
- General managers: Ed Barrow
- Managers: Joe McCarthy
- Radio: WOR (AM) (Mel Allen, Connie Desmond)

The 1942 New York Yankees season was the team's 40th season. The team finished with a record of 103–51, winning their 13th pennant, finishing 9 games ahead of the Boston Red Sox. New York was managed by Joe McCarthy. The Yankees played home games at Yankee Stadium. In the World Series, they lost to the St. Louis Cardinals in 5 games.

== Regular season ==
=== Season standings ===
American League
Team	W	L	Pct.	GB	Home	Road
New York Yankees	103	51	.669	—	58‍–‍19	45‍–‍32
Boston Red Sox	93	59	.612	9	53‍–‍24	40‍–‍35
St. Louis Browns	82	69	.543	19½	40‍–‍37	42‍–‍32
Cleveland Indians	75	79	.487	28	39‍–‍39	36‍–‍40
Detroit Tigers	73	81	.474	30	43‍–‍34	30‍–‍47
Chicago White Sox	66	82	.446	34	35‍–‍35	31‍–‍47
Washington Senators	62	89	.411	39½	35‍–‍42	27‍–‍47
Philadelphia Athletics	55	99	.357	48	25‍–‍51	30‍–‍48

=== Record vs. opponents ===
1942 American League record Sources:
Team	BOS	CWS	CLE	DET	NYY	PHA	SLB	WSH
Boston	—	13–8	14–8	15–7	12–10	14–8	11–11	14–7
Chicago	8–13	—	11–11	9–13	7–15	12–10	6–13	13–7
Cleveland	8–14	11–11	—	9–13–2	7–15	16–6	9–13	15–7
Detroit	7–15	13–9	13–9–2	—	7–15	13–9	11–11	9–13
New York	10–12	15–7	15–7	15–7	—	16–6	15–7	17–5
Philadelphia	8–14	10–12	6–16	9–13	6–16	—	6–16	10–12
St. Louis	11–11	13–6	13–9	11–11	7–15	16–6	—	11–11
Washington	7–14	7–13	7–15	13–9	5–17	12–10	11–11	—

=== Roster ===
1942 New York Yankees
Roster
Pitchers: 20 Tiny Bonham; 38 Hank Borowy; 30 Norm Branch; 24 Marv Breuer; 21 Spud Chandler; 28 Atley Donald; 11 Lefty Gomez; 18 Johnny Lindell; 19 Johnny Murphy; 36 Mel Queen; 15 Red Ruffing; 22 Marius Russo; 30 Jim Turner	Catchers: 8 Bill Dickey; 39 Rollie Hemsley; 25 Eddie Kearse; 12 Buddy Rosar; Infielders: 1 Frankie Crosetti; 6 Joe Gordon; 34 Buddy Hassett; 17 Ed Levy; 14 Jerry Priddy; 10 Phil Rizzuto; 2 Red Rolfe	Outfielders: 7 Roy Cullenbine; 5 Joe DiMaggio; 7 Tommy Henrich; 9 Charlie Keller; 3 George Selkirk; 16 Tuck Stainback; Other batters: 39 Mike Chartak	Manager: -- Joe McCarthy; Coaches: 32 Earle Combs; 31 Art Fletcher; -- Paul Schreiber; 33 Johnny Schulte

== Player stats ==
=== Batting ===
==== Starters by position ====
Note: Pos = Position; G = Games played; AB = At bats; H = Hits; Avg. = Batting average; HR = Home runs; RBI = Runs batted in

Pos	Player	G	AB	H	Avg.	HR	RBI
C	Bill Dickey	82	268	79	.295	2	37
1B	Buddy Hassett	132	538	153	.284	5	48
2B	Joe Gordon	155	538	162	.322	18	103
3B	Frankie Crosetti	74	285	69	.242	4	23
SS	Phil Rizzuto	144	553	157	.284	4	68
OF	Joe DiMaggio	154	610	173	.305	21	114
OF	Charlie Keller	152	544	159	.292	26	108
OF	Tommy Henrich	127	483	129	.267	13	67

==== Other batters ====
Note: G = Games played; AB = At bats; H = Hits; Avg. = Batting average; HR = Home runs; RBI = Runs batted in

Player	G	AB	H	Avg.	HR	RBI
Red Rolfe	69	285	48	.219	8	25
Buddy Rosar	69	209	48	.230	2	34
Jerry Priddy	59	189	53	.280	2	28
Rollie Hemsley	31	85	25	.294	0	15
George Selkirk	42	78	15	.192	0	10
Roy Cullenbine	21	77	28	.364	2	17
Ed Levy	13	41	5	.122	0	3
Eddie Kearse	11	26	5	.192	0	0
Tuck Stainback	15	10	2	.200	0	0
Mike Chartak	5	5	0	.000	0	0

=== Pitching ===
==== Starting pitchers ====
Note: G = Games pitched; IP = Innings pitched; W = Wins; L = Losses; ERA = Earned run average; SO = Strikeouts

Player	G	IP	W	L	ERA	SO
Tiny Bonham	28	226.0	21	5	2.27	71
Spud Chandler	24	200.2	16	5	2.38	74
Red Ruffing	24	193.2	14	7	3.21	80
Hank Borowy	25	178.2	15	4	2.52	85
Marv Breuer	27	164.1	8	9	3.07	72
Atley Donald	20	147.2	11	3	3.11	53
Lefty Gomez	13	80.0	6	4	4.28	41

==== Other pitchers ====
Note: G = Games pitched; IP = Innings pitched; W = Wins; L = Losses; ERA = Earned run average; SO = Strikeouts

Player	G	IP	W	L	ERA	SO
Marius Russo	9	45.1	4	1	2.78	15

==== Relief pitchers ====
Note: G = Games pitched; W = Wins; L = Losses; SV = Saves; ERA = Earned run average; SO = Strikeouts

Player	G	W	L	SV	ERA	SO
Johnny Murphy	31	4	10	11	3.41	24
Johnny Lindell	23	2	1	1	3.76	28
Norm Branch	10	0	1	2	6.32	13
Jim Turner	5	1	1	1	1.29	2
Mel Queen	4	1	0	0	0.00	0

== 1942 World Series ==
NL St. Louis Cardinals (4) vs. AL New York Yankees (1)

Game	Score	Date	Location	Attendance
1	Yankees – 7, Cardinals – 4	September 30	Sportsman's Park	34,769
2	Yankees – 3, Cardinals – 4	October 1	Sportsman's Park	34,255
3	Cardinals – 2, Yankees – 0	October 3	Yankee Stadium	69,123
4	Cardinals – 9, Yankees – 6	October 4	Yankee Stadium	69,902
5	Cardinals – 4, Yankees – 2	October 5	Yankee Stadium	69,052

== Farm system ==
Level	Team	League	Manager
AA	Kansas City Blues	American Association	Johnny Neun
AA	Newark Bears	International League	Billy Meyer
A	Binghamton Triplets	Eastern League	Eddie Sawyer
B	Norfolk Tars	Piedmont League	Buzz Boyle
B	Augusta Tigers	Sally League	Alton Biggs and Wally Schang
C	Amsterdam Rugmakers	Canadian–American League	Paul O'Malley and Tom Kain
C	Joplin Miners	Western Association	Doc Bennett
D	Butler Yankees	Pennsylvania State Association	Dallas Warren
D	Wellsville Yankees	PONY League	Walt Van Grofski
D	Fond du Lac Panthers	Wisconsin State League	Ray Powell

LEAGUE CHAMPIONS: Butler
