= Frankie Hayes =

American baseball player (1914–1955)

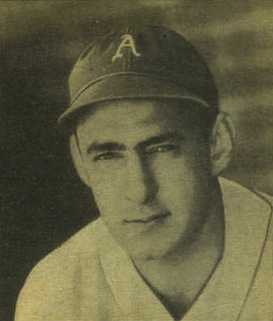
- Catcher
- Born: October 13, 1914; Jamesburg, New Jersey, U.S.
- Died: June 22, 1955 (aged 40); Point Pleasant, New Jersey, U.S.
- Batted: Right Threw: Right

MLB debut
- September 21, 1933, for the Philadelphia Athletics

Last MLB appearance
- May 17, 1947, for the Boston Red Sox

MLB statistics
- Batting average: .259
- Home runs: 119
- Runs batted in: 628
- Stats at Baseball Reference

Teams
- Philadelphia Athletics (1933–1934, 1936–1942); St. Louis Browns (1942–1943); Philadelphia Athletics (1944–1945); Cleveland Indians (1945–1946); Chicago White Sox (1946); Boston Red Sox (1947)

Career highlights and awards
- 6× All-Star (1939–1941, 1944–1946)

Franklin Witman "Blimp" Hayes (October 13, 1914 – June 22, 1955) was an American professional baseball player. He played in Major League Baseball (MLB) as a catcher between 1933 and 1947, most prominently as a member of the Philadelphia Athletics, where he became a six-time All-Star player. He also played for the St. Louis Browns, Cleveland Indians, Chicago White Sox, and the Boston Red Sox.

Although Hayes was considered one of the best catchers in the American League in the late 1930s and early 1940s, he played for an Athletics team that routinely finished in last place. He holds the major league record of most consecutive games played by a catcher.

== Early years ==
Born and raised in Jamesburg, New Jersey, Hayes was nicknamed "Blimp", even though he was listed at 6 ft 0 in (1.83 m) and 185 lb (84 kg). He first caught the attention of an umpire who then recommended him to Connie Mack, the owner and manager of the Philadelphia Athletics.

== Philadelphia Athletics ==
Hayes made his major league debut with the Athletics on September 21, 1933, at the age of 18, making him the youngest player in the league at the time. He was hitless in five at bats that season.

After the Athletics' regular catcher, Charlie Berry, suffered an injury in 1934, Hayes took his place and set a major league record for most games caught in a season by a teenager when he appeared in 92 games as a nineteen-year-old. In September 1934, Hayes joined a group of American baseball players led by Connie Mack in a barnstorming tour of Japan when Charlie Berry, who had originally been selected to go, was struck with appendicitis. Among the baseball players who joined Hayes in Japan were Babe Ruth, Lou Gehrig, Jimmie Foxx and Charlie Gehringer. He was sent to the minor leagues in 1935, where he played for the Buffalo Bisons and the Albany Senators of the International League.

Hayes returned to the major leagues in 1936, replacing Paul Richards as the Athletics starting catcher, a position he held for six seasons. On July 25, 1936, he tied a major league record by hitting 4 doubles in a game against the Cleveland Indians. In 1939, Hayes earned his first All-Star selection when he was named as a reserve behind Bill Dickey on the American League team in the 1939 All-Star Game. He ended the year with a .283 batting average along with career-highs of 20 home runs and 83 runs batted in. His batting average improved in 1940, when he posted a .308 batting average with 16 home runs and 70 runs batted in. Hayes' on-base percentage also improved from .348 in 1939 to .389, and was once again named as a reserve player for the American League team in the 1940 All-Star Game. He had another respectable season in 1941, hitting for a .280 average along with 12 home runs and 63 runs batted in, and for the third consecutive year, was named to as a reserve player for the American League in the 1941 All-Star Game. Despite his contributions, the Athletics finished in last place for the second consecutive season.

== Brief stint with the Browns ==
In January 1942, Hayes had a knee operation which delayed his appearance at spring training and consequently caused him to gain weight. This setback along with the impressive performance by his replacement, Hal Wagner, made Hayes dispensable and on June 1, 1942, he was traded to the St. Louis Browns for Bob Harris and Bob Swift. After hitting for only a .188 batting average in 1943, it appeared as if his baseball career might be at an end when Connie Mack brought him back to the Athletics in a trade for Sam Zoldak in February 1944. Back in Philadelphia, his career was rejuvenated, producing a career-high 144 hits in 581 at bats, for a .248 batting average, with 13 home runs, 18 doubles, 6 triples and led the Athletics with 78 runs batted in while batting as their cleanup hitter. Hayes caught every one of the Athletics' 155 games and led American League catchers in games played, putouts, assists, and in baserunners caught stealing. He was also named to the American League All-Star team for the fourth time in his career and, ranked 14th in the 1944 American League Most Valuable Player Award balloting.

== Cleveland Indians ==
Although Hayes was rated as one of the top catchers in Major League Baseball, he had a reputation for being temperamental and, this may have played a role in Mack's decision to trade him to the Cleveland Indians for catcher Buddy Rosar in May 1945. Contemporary news reports expressed astonishment over the trade, as Hayes was considered one of the best catchers in the league while Rosar was refusing to play for the Indians due to a salary dispute. Hayes immediately assumed the starting catcher's role for the Indians, leading American League catchers with 145 games played and a .988 fielding percentage. He was selected to be a reserve catcher for the American League in the 1945 All-Star Game; however, the game was cancelled due to wartime travel restrictions.

From October 2, 1943, to April 21, 1946, Hayes caught 312 consecutive games, a record for major league catchers that has never been broken. Hayes was the Indians catcher on April 30, 1946, when Bob Feller threw a no hitter and, he provided the only run of the game with a ninth-inning home run.

== Chicago White Sox ==
In the middle of the 1946 season while mired in a hitting slump, Hayes had a falling out with Indians' manager Lou Boudreau over being benched in favor of Sherm Lollar. Five days after starting for the American League in the 1946 All-Star game, he was traded to the Chicago White Sox. He was released by the White Sox after the 1946 season then, signed with the Boston Red Sox as a free agent. He was given his unconditional release by the Red Sox on May 17, 1947, at the age of 32.

== Career statistics ==
In a fourteen-year major league career, Hayes played in 1,364 games, accumulating 1,164 hits in 4,493 at bats for a .259 career batting average along with 119 home runs, 585 runs batted in and a .343 on-base percentage. He ended his career with a .977 fielding percentage. He compiled 30 career stolen bases along with 213 doubles and 32 triples. During his career, he was named to six All-Star teams. He led the American League three times in total chances per game, twice each in putouts, double plays, and once each in assists and fielding percentage as a catcher. When he caught 155 games in 1944, he set a still-standing American League record for games played in a season as catcher. His accomplishment of 312 consecutive games caught remains an unbroken major league record. Hayes' 29 double plays in 1945 is the second-highest season total ever for a catcher, behind Steve O'Neill's record of 36, set in 1916.

== Later life ==
Hayes operated a sporting goods store in Point Pleasant, New Jersey, after his playing career. He died at the age of 40 in Point Pleasant in 1955, eight years after retiring as a professional baseball player. His family declined to reveal the cause of his death. However, TheDeadBallEra.com lists it as retroperitoneal hemorrhage in the site's "Too Young to Die" entries for 1955.
