= Glenn McQuillen =

American baseball player (1915-1989)

- Outfielder
- Born: April 19, 1915; Strasburg, Virginia, U.S.
- Died: June 8, 1989 (aged 74); Gardenville, Maryland, U.S.
- Batted: Right Threw: Right

MLB debut
- June 16, 1938, for the St. Louis Browns

Last MLB appearance
- April 15, 1947, for the St. Louis Browns

MLB statistics
- Batting average: .274
- Home runs: 4
- Runs batted in: 75
- Stats at Baseball Reference

Teams
- St. Louis Browns (1938, 1941–1942, 1946–1947)

Glenn Richard McQuillen (April 19, 1915 – June 8, 1989), known also as "Red", was an American professional baseball player. During a 210-game, five-season career in Major League Baseball, all with the St. Louis Browns, he was a reserve outfielder, playing mainly in left field. He was listed at 6 feet (1.8 m), 198 pounds (90 kg) and batted and threw right-handed.

A native of Strasburg, Virginia, McQuillen attended what is now McDaniel College in Westminster, Maryland, and reported immediately to the Browns upon signing with them in 1938. In his first professional and Major League game, he hit a double as a pinch hitter off Johnny Marcum of the Boston Red Sox, collecting his first run batted in during a 12–8 loss at Sportsman's Park. McQullen batted an MLB career-high .284 that season, collecting 33 hits in 43 games with St. Louis. He then spent 1939, 1940 and most of 1941 in minor league baseball at the upper levels of the Browns' farm system. After a seven-game recall to the Browns during September 1941, McQuillen spent all of 1942 on the St. Louis roster, when he posted career highs in games (100), runs (40), hits( 96), and RBI (47), while hitting for a .283 average.

McQuillen enlisted in the United States Navy before the 1943 season, serving on the destroyer USS Bennett in the Pacific Theater of Operations for three years before rejoining the Browns during the 1946 and 1947 seasons. In 1946, he again spent a full season with the Browns, but he could not crack their starting outfield and his batting mark fell to .241.

In a five-season MLB career, McQuillen was a .274 hitter (176-for-643) with four home runs and 75 RBI in 210 games. Following his major league stint, he spent 10 years playing and managing in the minors, leaving baseball after the 1956 season.

McQuillen died in Gardenville, Maryland, at the age of 74.
