= 1942 Boston Red Sox season =

Major League Baseball season

1942 Boston Red Sox
- League: American League
- Ballpark: Fenway Park
- City: Boston, Massachusetts
- Record: 93–59 (.612)
- League place: 2nd
- Owners: Tom Yawkey
- President: Tom Yawkey
- General managers: Eddie Collins
- Managers: Joe Cronin
- Radio: WAAB (Jim Britt, Tom Hussey)
- Stats: ESPN.com; Baseball Reference

The 1942 Boston Red Sox season was the 42nd season in the franchise's Major League Baseball history. The Red Sox finished second in the American League (AL) with a record of 93 wins and 59 losses, nine games behind the New York Yankees.

Red Sox left fielder Ted Williams won the Triple Crown, leading the AL in home runs (36), runs batted in (137), and batting average (.356).

== Offseason ==
- December 13, 1941: Stan Spence and Jack Wilson were traded by the Red Sox to the Washington Senators for Johnny Welaj and Ken Chase.

== Regular season ==
The team's season spanned April 14 to September 27, although the team did not play any major-league games from September 22 through September 26, inclusive. On September 25, the Red Sox defeated the Pawtucket Slaters, a team in the then semi-professional New England League, in a game at Pawtucket Stadium (later known as McCoy Stadium) in Pawtucket, Rhode Island.

=== Season standings ===
American League
Team	W	L	Pct.	GB	Home	Road
New York Yankees	103	51	.669	—	58‍–‍19	45‍–‍32
Boston Red Sox	93	59	.612	9	53‍–‍24	40‍–‍35
St. Louis Browns	82	69	.543	19½	40‍–‍37	42‍–‍32
Cleveland Indians	75	79	.487	28	39‍–‍39	36‍–‍40
Detroit Tigers	73	81	.474	30	43‍–‍34	30‍–‍47
Chicago White Sox	66	82	.446	34	35‍–‍35	31‍–‍47
Washington Senators	62	89	.411	39½	35‍–‍42	27‍–‍47
Philadelphia Athletics	55	99	.357	48	25‍–‍51	30‍–‍48

=== Record vs. opponents ===
1942 American League record Sources:
Team	BOS	CWS	CLE	DET	NYY	PHA	SLB	WSH
Boston	—	13–8	14–8	15–7	12–10	14–8	11–11	14–7
Chicago	8–13	—	11–11	9–13	7–15	12–10	6–13	13–7
Cleveland	8–14	11–11	—	9–13–2	7–15	16–6	9–13	15–7
Detroit	7–15	13–9	13–9–2	—	7–15	13–9	11–11	9–13
New York	10–12	15–7	15–7	15–7	—	16–6	15–7	17–5
Philadelphia	8–14	10–12	6–16	9–13	6–16	—	6–16	10–12
St. Louis	11–11	13–6	13–9	11–11	7–15	16–6	—	11–11
Washington	7–14	7–13	7–15	13–9	5–17	12–10	11–11	—

=== Notable transactions ===
- June 1, 1942: Jimmie Foxx was selected off waivers from the Red Sox by the Chicago Cubs.

=== Opening Day lineup ===
6	Johnny Pesky	SS
7	Dom DiMaggio	CF
9	Ted Williams	LF
3	Jimmie Foxx	1B
5	Jim Tabor	3B
12	Pete Fox	RF
26	Skeeter Newsome	2B
11	Johnny Peacock	C
28	Dick Newsome	P

=== Roster ===
1942 Boston Red Sox
Roster
Pitchers: 25 Mace Brown; 24 Bill Butland; 10 Ken Chase; 17 Joe Dobson; 21 Tex Hughson; 29 Oscar Judd; 28 Dick Newsome; 20 Mike Ryba; 18 Yank Terry; 27 Charlie Wagner	Catchers: 23 Bill Conroy; 11 Johnny Peacock; Infielders: 14 Tom Carey; 4 Joe Cronin; 1 Bobby Doerr; 3 Jimmie Foxx; 16 Tony Lupien; 26 Skeeter Newsome; 6 Johnny Pesky; 5 Jim Tabor	Outfielders: 15 Paul Campbell; 7 Dom DiMaggio; 8 Lou Finney; 12 Pete Fox; 42 Andy Gilbert; 9 Ted Williams	Manager: 4 Joe Cronin; Coaches: 30 Tom Daly (Third base); 31 Frank Shellenback (Pitching); 22 Larry Woodall (First base)

== Player stats ==
= Indicates team leader

= Indicates league leader

=== Batting ===
==== Starters by position ====
Note: Pos = Position; G = Games played; AB = At bats; H = Hits; Avg. = Batting average; HR = Home runs; RBI = Runs batted in

Pos	Player	G	AB	H	Avg.	HR	RBI	SB
C	Johnny Peacock	88	286	76	.266	0	25	1
1B	Tony Lupien	128	463	130	.281	3	70	10
2B	Bobby Doerr	144	545	158	.290	15	102	4
SS	Johnny Pesky	147	620	205	.331	2	51	12
3B	Jim Tabor	139	508	128	.252	12	75	6
OF	Ted Williams	150	522	186	.356	36	137	3
OF	Lou Finney	113	397	113	.285	3	61	3
OF	Dom DiMaggio	151	622	178	.286	14	48	16

==== Other batters ====
Note: G = Games played; AB = At bats; H = Hits; Avg. = Batting average; HR = Home runs; RBI = Runs batted in

Player	G	AB	H	Avg.	HR	RBI
Pete Fox	77	256	67	.262	3	42
Bill Conroy	83	250	50	.200	4	20
Jimmie Foxx	30	100	27	.270	5	14
Skeeter Newsome	29	95	26	.274	0	9
Joe Cronin	45	79	24	.304	4	24
Paul Campbell	26	15	1	.067	0	0
Andy Gilbert	6	11	1	.091	0	1
Tom Carey	1	1	1	1.000	0	1

=== Pitching ===
==== Starting pitchers ====
Note: G = Games pitched; IP = Innings pitched; W = Wins; L = Losses; ERA = Earned run average; SO = Strikeouts

Player	G	IP	W	L	ERA	SO
Tex Hughson	38	281.0	22	6	2.59	113*
Charlie Wagner	29	205.1	14	11	3.29	52
Joe Dobson	30	182.2	11	9	3.30	72
Dick Newsome	24	158.0	8	10	5.01	40
Ken Chase	13	80.1	5	1	3.81	34

- Tied with Bobo Newsom (Washington)

==== Other pitchers ====
Note: G = Games pitched; IP = Innings pitched; W = Wins; L = Losses; ERA = Earned run average; SO = Strikeouts

Player	G	IP	W	L	ERA	SO
Oscar Judd	31	150.1	8	10	3.89	70
Bill Butland	23	111.1	7	1	2.51	46
Yank Terry	20	85.0	6	5	3.92	37

==== Relief pitchers ====
Note: G = Games pitched; W = Wins; L = Losses; SV = Saves; ERA = Earned run average; SO = Strikeouts

Player	G	W	L	SV	ERA	SO
Mace Brown	34	9	3	6	3.43	20
Mike Ryba	18	3	3	3	3.86	16

== Awards and honors ==
=== League leaders ===
- Ted Williams, American League home run leader (36), RBI leader (137), and batting average leader (.356)

== Farm system ==
Level	Team	League	Manager
AA	Louisville Colonels	American Association	Bill Burwell
A	Scranton Red Sox	Eastern League	Nemo Leibold
B	Greensboro Red Sox	Piedmont League	Heinie Manush
C	Oneonta Indians	Canadian–American League	Red Barnes
C	Canton Terriers	Middle Atlantic League	Floyd "Pat" Patterson
D	Danville-Schoolfield Leafs	Bi-State League	Elmer Yoter
D	Owensboro Oilers	KITTY League	Wally Schang

LEAGUE CHAMPIONS: Scranton, Greensboro

KITTY League folded, June 19, 1942
