= Frank Biscan =

American baseball player (1920–1959)

- Pitcher
- Born: March 13, 1920; Mount Olive, Illinois, U.S.
- Died: May 22, 1959 (aged 39); St. Louis, Missouri, U.S.
- Batted: Left Threw: Left

MLB debut
- May 3, 1942, for the St. Louis Browns

Last MLB appearance
- September 30, 1948, for the St. Louis Browns

MLB statistics
- Win–loss record: 7–9
- Earned run average: 5.28
- Strikeouts: 64
- Stats at Baseball Reference

Teams
- St. Louis Browns (1942, 1946, 1948)

Frank Stephen Biscan (March 13, 1920 – May 22, 1959) was an American professional baseball player, a left-handed pitcher who appeared in Major League Baseball for the St. Louis Browns in parts of three seasons (1942; 1946; 1948). Nicknamed "Porky", he was listed at 5 feet 11 inches (1.80 m) tall and 190 pounds (86 kg).

In 74 MLB games (all but four as a relief pitcher) and 148 1/3 innings pitched, Biscan allowed 170 hits and 104 bases on balls, with 64 strikeouts. He recorded one complete game and four saves. In the minor leagues, Biscan won 26 of 30 decisions for the 1940 Lima Pandas of the Class D Ohio State League, and won 17 games for three consecutive seasons (1950–52).

From 1942 to 1945 Biscan served in the United States Navy during World War II. He died from heart disease at the age of 39 in St. Louis, Missouri.
