= 1942 Chicago White Sox season =

1942 Chicago White Sox
- League: American League
- Ballpark: Comiskey Park
- City: Chicago
- Owners: Grace Comiskey
- General manager: Harry Grabiner
- Managers: Jimmy Dykes
- Radio: WGN (AM) (Bob Elson, Jack Brickhouse); WCFL (Hal Totten); WJJD (Pat Flanagan, Jack L. Fitzpatrick)

The 1942 Chicago White Sox season was the White Sox's 43rd season. They finished with a record of 66–82, good enough for sixth place in the American League, 34 games behind the first place New York Yankees.

== Offseason ==
- December 9, 1941: Mike Kreevich and Jack Hallett were traded by the White Sox to the Philadelphia Athletics for Wally Moses.

== Regular season ==
=== Season standings ===
American League
Team	W	L	Pct.	GB	Home	Road
New York Yankees	103	51	.669	—	58‍–‍19	45‍–‍32
Boston Red Sox	93	59	.612	9	53‍–‍24	40‍–‍35
St. Louis Browns	82	69	.543	19½	40‍–‍37	42‍–‍32
Cleveland Indians	75	79	.487	28	39‍–‍39	36‍–‍40
Detroit Tigers	73	81	.474	30	43‍–‍34	30‍–‍47
Chicago White Sox	66	82	.446	34	35‍–‍35	31‍–‍47
Washington Senators	62	89	.411	39½	35‍–‍42	27‍–‍47
Philadelphia Athletics	55	99	.357	48	25‍–‍51	30‍–‍48

=== Record vs. opponents ===
1942 American League record Sources:
Team	BOS	CWS	CLE	DET	NYY	PHA	SLB	WSH
Boston	—	13–8	14–8	15–7	12–10	14–8	11–11	14–7
Chicago	8–13	—	11–11	9–13	7–15	12–10	6–13	13–7
Cleveland	8–14	11–11	—	9–13–2	7–15	16–6	9–13	15–7
Detroit	7–15	13–9	13–9–2	—	7–15	13–9	11–11	9–13
New York	10–12	15–7	15–7	15–7	—	16–6	15–7	17–5
Philadelphia	8–14	10–12	6–16	9–13	6–16	—	6–16	10–12
St. Louis	11–11	13–6	13–9	11–11	7–15	16–6	—	11–11
Washington	7–14	7–13	7–15	13–9	5–17	12–10	11–11	—

=== Opening Day lineup ===
- Don Kolloway, 2B
- Wally Moses, CF
- Joe Kuhel, 1B
- Luke Appling, SS
- Bud Sketchley, RF
- Myril Hoag, LF
- Bob Kennedy, 3B
- Mike Tresh, C
- Johnny Rigney, P

=== Roster ===
1942 Chicago White Sox
Roster
Pitchers: 48 Pete Appleton; 18 Bill Dietrich; 45 Orval Grove; 35 Joe Haynes; 26 Johnny Humphries; 27 Thornton Lee; 16 Ted Lyons; 34 Len Perme; 29 Johnny Rigney; 19 Buck Ross; 46 Eddie Smith; 39,24 Jake Wade; 39 Ed Weiland	Catchers: 14 George Dickey; 15 Mike Tresh; 17 Tom Turner; Infielders: 4 Luke Appling; 20 Jimmy Grant; -- Jake Jones; 25 Bob Kennedy; 47 Don Kolloway; 3 Joe Kuhel; 7 Dario Lodigiani; 37 Skeeter Webb; 36 Leo Wells	Outfielders: -- Val Heim; 8 Myril Hoag; 9 Wally Moses; -- Bill Mueller; 12 Bud Sketchley; -- Thurman Tucker; 34 Sam West; 6 Taffy Wright	Manager: 5 Jimmy Dykes; Coaches: 22 Mule Haas; 33 Bing Miller; 38 Muddy Ruel

== Player stats ==
=== Batting ===
Note: G = Games played; AB = At bats; R = Runs scored; H = Hits; 2B = Doubles; 3B = Triples; HR = Home runs; RBI = Runs batted in; BB = Base on balls; SO = Strikeouts; AVG = Batting average; SB = Stolen bases

Player	G	AB	R	H	2B	3B	HR	RBI	BB	SO	AVG	SB
Luke Appling, SS	142	543	78	142	26	4	3	53	63	23	.262	17
George Dickey, C	59	116	6	27	3	0	1	17	9	11	.233	0
Jimmy Grant, 3B	12	36	0	6	1	1	0	1	5	6	.167	0
Val Heim, LF, RF	13	45	6	9	1	1	0	7	5	3	.200	1
Myril Hoag, CF, LF	113	412	47	99	18	2	2	37	36	21	.240	17
Jake Jones, 1B	7	20	2	3	1	0	0	0	2	2	.150	1
Bob Kennedy, 3B, LF	113	412	37	95	18	5	0	38	22	41	.231	11
Don Kolloway, 2B, 1B	147	601	72	164	40	4	3	60	30	39	.273	16
Joe Kuhel, 1B	115	413	60	103	14	4	4	52	60	22	.249	22
Dario Lodigiani, 3B, 2B	59	168	9	47	7	0	0	15	18	10	.280	3
Wally Moses, RF, CF	146	577	73	156	28	4	7	49	74	27	.270	16
Bill Mueller, CF, RF	26	85	5	14	1	0	0	5	12	9	.165	2
Bud Sketchley, RF	13	36	1	7	1	0	0	3	7	4	.194	0
Mike Tresh, C	72	233	21	54	8	1	0	15	28	24	.232	2
Thurman Tucker, CF	7	24	2	3	0	1	0	1	0	4	.125	0
Tom Turner, C	56	182	18	44	9	1	3	21	19	15	.242	0
Skeeter Webb, 2B	32	94	5	16	2	1	0	4	4	13	.170	1
Leo Wells, SS, 3B	35	62	8	12	2	0	1	4	4	5	.194	1
Sam West, CF, LF	49	151	14	35	5	0	0	25	31	18	.232	2
Taffy Wright, LF	85	300	43	100	13	5	0	47	48	9	.333	1

Player	G	AB	R	H	2B	3B	HR	RBI	BB	SO	AVG	SB
Bill Dietrich, P	26	48	2	5	1	0	0	5	5	22	.104	0
Orval Grove, P	12	22	2	5	0	0	1	1	0	5	.227	0
Joe Haynes, P	40	28	3	5	0	0	0	5	2	5	.179	0
Johnny Humphries, P	28	80	9	18	6	1	0	5	4	33	.225	0
Thornton Lee, P	11	30	0	6	2	0	0	2	0	10	.200	0
Ted Lyons, P	20	67	10	16	4	0	0	10	3	7	.239	0
Len Perme, P	4	3	0	1	0	0	0	0	0	0	.333	0
Johnny Rigney, P	7	19	1	1	0	0	0	0	1	4	.053	0
Buck Ross, P	22	38	2	6	3	0	0	3	1	10	.158	0
Eddie Smith, P	29	73	2	9	0	1	0	0	3	15	.123	1
Jake Wade, P	15	29	0	7	0	0	0	1	1	8	.241	0
Ed Weiland, P	5	2	0	0	0	0	0	0	0	0	.000	0
Team totals	148	4949	538	1215	214	36	25	486	497	425	.246	114

=== Pitching ===
Note: W = Wins; L = Losses; ERA = Earned run average; G = Games pitched; GS = Games started; SV = Saves; IP = Innings pitched; H = Hits allowed; R = Runs allowed; ER = Earned runs allowed; HR = Home runs allowed; BB = Walks allowed; K = Strikeouts

Player	W	L	ERA	G	GS	SV	IP	H	R	ER	HR	BB	K
Pete Appleton	0	0	3.86	4	0	0	4.2	2	2	2	0	3	2
Bill Dietrich	6	11	4.89	26	23	0	160.0	173	92	87	16	70	39
Orval Grove	4	6	5.16	12	8	0	66.1	77	47	38	1	33	21
Joe Haynes	8	5	2.62	40	1	6	103.0	88	37	30	6	47	35
Johnny Humphries	12	12	2.68	28	28	0	228.1	227	85	68	9	59	71
Thornton Lee	2	6	3.32	11	8	0	76.0	82	38	28	4	31	25
Ted Lyons	14	6	2.10	20	20	0	180.1	167	52	42	11	26	50
Len Perme	0	1	1.38	4	1	0	13.0	5	2	2	0	4	4
Johnny Rigney	3	3	3.20	7	7	0	59.0	40	23	21	2	16	34
Buck Ross	5	7	5.00	22	14	1	113.1	118	63	63	6	39	37
Eddie Smith	7	20	3.98	29	28	1	215.0	223	112	95	17	86	78
Jake Wade	5	5	4.10	15	10	0	85.2	84	45	39	2	56	32
Ed Weiland	0	0	7.45	5	0	0	9.2	18	11	8	0	3	4
Team totals	66	82	3.58	148	148	8	1314.1	1304	609	523	74	473	432

== Farm system ==
Level	Team	League	Manager
AA	St. Paul Saints	American Association	Truck Hannah and Bob Tarlton
B	Waterloo White Hawks	Illinois–Indiana–Iowa League	Johnny Mostil
C	Grand Forks Chiefs	Northern League	Larry Bettencourt
C	Superior Blues	Northern League	Art Haugher
D	Lockport White Sox	PONY League	Joe Martin and Bill Prince
D	Wisconsin Rapids White Sox	Wisconsin State League	Frank Parenti and Roger Reinhart
