= Frank Croucher =

American baseball player (1914–1980)

- Shortstop
- Born: July 23, 1914; San Antonio, Texas, U.S.
- Died: May 21, 1980 (aged 65); Webster, Texas, U.S.
- Batted: Right Threw: Right

MLB debut
- April 18, 1939, for the Detroit Tigers

Last MLB appearance
- September 23, 1942, for the Washington Senators

MLB statistics
- Batting average: .251
- Home runs: 7
- Runs batted in: 86
- Stats at Baseball Reference

Teams
- Detroit Tigers (1939–1941); Washington Senators (1942)

Frank Donald Croucher (July 23, 1914 – May 21, 1980), nicknamed "Dingle", was an American baseball shortstop. He played professional baseball from 1934 to 1942 and 1946 to 1947, including four seasons in Major League Baseball with the Detroit Tigers (1939–1941) and Washington Senators (1942). He was the Tigers' starting shortstop in 1939 and 1941. In four major league seasons, he appeared in 296 games and compiled a .251 batting average with 7 home runs and 86 RBI. He missed the 1943 through 1945 seasons due to service in the United States Army Air Forces during World War II.

During his minor league career, Croucher played for the Alexandria Aces (1934), Springfield Senators (1935), Beaumont Exporters (1935-1936, 1938), Toledo Mud Hens (1946), San Antonio Missions (1946-1947), and Little Rock Travelers (1947).

== Early years ==
Crowder was born in 1914 in San Antonio, Texas.

== Professional baseball ==
=== Minor leagues ===
Croucher began playing professional baseball in 1934 as the second baseman for the Alexandria Aces of the Evangeline League. He hit .270 with a .395 slugging percentage at Alexandria.

In 1935, he played second base for the Springfield Senators of the Three-I League, a farm team in the Detroit Tigers' farm system. He improved his batting average to .347 with a .486 slugging percentage.

In 1936, he played second base for the Beaumont Exporters in the Texas League. He compiled a .321 batting average with career highs in doubles (36), triples (12), and home runs (11). Jack Zeller, who was then Detroit's scout in the Texas League, described Croucher: "This kid is a fielding fool. He owns a pair of sure hands, goes equally well to his left and right, gets the ball away fast and owns a powerful throwing arm. Croucher is gifted with baseball sense and studies batters and anticipates plays smartly. Frank is a natural hitter, too. If he has any weakness I failed to detect it while watching him play in more than 100 games last season."

In 1937, he advanced to the Tigers' top farm team, the Toledo Mud Hens of the American Association. He was Toledo's starting shortstop in 1936, appearing in 152 games while compiling a .276 batting average. He was shifted to shortstop because Detroit's second base position was covered by Hall of Famer Charlie Gehringer.

=== Detroit Tigers ===
Croucher impressed the Tigers during spring training in 1938, so much so that they moved long-time shortstop Billy Rogell to third base to make room for Croucher at shortstop. Manager Mickey Cochrane noted: "This Croucher can go a long way to get a ball. It's going to be hard to keep him off the team." However, on April 2, 1938, Croucher broke his leg while sliding into second base during a Florida exhibition game against the St. Louis Cardinals. Upon seeing Croucher's injury, teammate Don Ross noted: "My stomach turned over half a dozen times when I saw Frank's right leg doubled up like a pretzel. It was a terrible feeling. I'm not quite sure how I finished the game." Croucher's bone had to be screwed back together, and he was hospitalized for five weeks. Doctors and others who saw Croucher's "foot dangling at the ankle" called it one of the worst bone breaks ever seen on a baseball player and predicted he would never play again.

Croucher returned from his injury in September 1938, appearing in 11 games for Beaumont. When he showed up at the Tigers' training camp in 1939, Hank Greenberg called Croucher "the best young player we have in camp." He made the club and replaced Rogell as Detroit's starting shortstop. Croucher appeared in 97 games (87 as the starter) at shortstop in 1939. At the plate, he hit .269 with five home runs and a .303 on-base percentage.

Croucher lost the starting job in 1940 to Dick Bartell. He appeared in only 27 games in 1940, only seven games as the starting shortstop, and his batting average dropped to .105 as he managed only six hits in 57 at bats. Croucher played one inning in Game 6 of the 1940 World Series at shortstop, as a replacement for Dick Bartell, but did not bat.

In 1941, Croucher regained his job as the Tigers' starting shortstop. He appeared in 136 games, 133 as the team's starting shortstop, and brought his batting average up to a respectable .254.

On December 12, 1941, Croucher was traded by the Detroit Tigers with Bruce Campbell to the Washington Senators in exchange for Jimmy Bloodworth and Doc Cramer. At the time, the Detroit Free Press wrote: "Once hailed as the most promising prospect of the Tiger farm system, . . . Croucher was believed by many to have lost whatever chance he ever had of making good at Detroit. Even his friends suggested that a change of scenery might be beneficial to him."

=== Washington Senators ===
Croucher missed most of 1942 with a sore arm, playing only 26 games for the Senators. In four major league seasons, Croucher played in 296 games and had a .251 batting average, with 7 home runs, 86 RBI, 94 runs, a .295 on-base percentage and a .324 slugging percentage.

=== Military service ===
In February 1943, Croucher was inducted into the United States Army. He missed the 1943, 1944, and 1945 seasons due to wartime military service.

=== Postwar comeback attempt ===
After the war, Croucher attempted a comeback in the St. Louis Browns' farm system. During the 1946 season, he played 16 games for the Toledo Mud Hens and 85 games for the San Antonio Missions. His batting average in 1946 was .190. He began the 1947 season with San Antonio, but was traded to the Little Rock Travelers in early May. He appeared in only 17 games in 1947 (eight with San Antonio, nine with Little Rock) and compiled a .196 batting average.

== Later years ==
Croucher died in 1980 at Webster, Texas.
