= Wendel, Pennsylvania =

Unincorporated community in Pennsylvania, US

- Unincorporated community
- Location within Pennsylvania
- Coordinates: 40°17′44″N 79°41′11″W
- Country: United States
- State: Pennsylvania
- County: Westmoreland
- Elevation: 1,407 ft (429 m)
- Time zone: UTC-5 (Eastern (EST))
  - Summer (DST): UTC-4 (EDT)
- ZIP code: 15691
- Area codes: 724, 878
- GNIS feature ID: 1190824

Wendel is an unincorporated community and former coal town in Westmoreland County, Pennsylvania, United States. It is 2.2 miles (3.5 km) south of Irwin.

Wendel was associated with The Pittsburgh and Baltimore Coal Company's Edna No. 2 mine, which began operations in 1902. The company built houses for employees and a company store in Wendel. A sister mine, Edna No. 1, constructed in 1900, operated nearby. Both closed in the late 1930s.

Wendel formerly had its own post office, established on April 24, 1908, and zip code. The post office closed in February 2021.
