= Bobby Estalella (outfielder) =

Cuban baseball player (1911–1991)

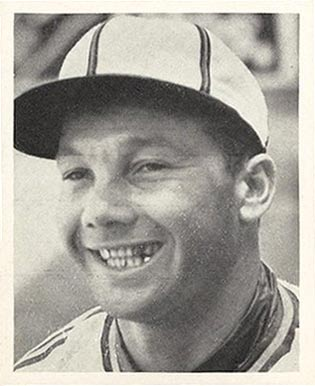
- Outfielder
- Born: April 25, 1911; Cárdenas, Cuba
- Died: January 6, 1991 (aged 79); Hialeah, Florida, U.S.
- Batted: Right Threw: Right

MLB debut
- September 7, 1935, for the Washington Senators

Last MLB appearance
- September 16, 1949, for the Philadelphia Athletics

MLB statistics
- Batting average: .282
- Home runs: 44
- Runs batted in: 308
- Stats at Baseball Reference

Teams
- Washington Senators (1935–1936, 1939); St. Louis Browns (1941); Washington Senators (1942); Philadelphia Athletics (1943–1945, 1949)

Roberto Estalella Ventoza [es-tah-LAY-yah] (April 25, 1911 – January 6, 1991) was a Cuban professional baseball outfielder and third baseman, who played in Major League Baseball (MLB) for the Washington Senators (1935–1936, 1939 and 1942), St. Louis Browns (1941), and Philadelphia Athletics (1943–1945 and 1949). He was selected to represent the American League (AL) in the ill-fated 1945 Major League Baseball All-Star Game, which was scheduled for July 10 at Fenway Park but never played because of World War II restrictions on civilian domestic travel.

== Early life ==
Born in Cárdenas, Matanzas, Cuba, Estalella earned the nickname "Tarzan" by his medium-frame, stocky and compact body. Standing 5 feet 8 inches (1.73 m) tall and weighing 180 pounds (82 kg), he threw and batted right-handed.

== Professional career ==
Estalella's organized baseball career began in the minor leagues in 1934. After two brief trials with the 1935–1936 Harrisburg Senators, Estalella led the Class B Piedmont League in home runs (33) and batting average (.349) in 1937, and in 1938 he won the circuit's Triple Crown, pacing the Piedmont League in batting (.378), homers (38) and runs batted in (123), as well as in hits (180) and runs scored (134). After that, he returned to the American League to spend full or partial seasons with the Senators (1939 and 1942) and Browns (1941). He was sent to the Athletics in 1943 in the same trade that brought All-Star outfielder "Indian Bob" Johnson to Washington.

With Philadelphia, Estalella hit .298 in 1944 and .299 in 1945 (fourth in the league). He would have played many more years, but he was one of the players suspended by Commissioner Happy Chandler in 1946 for jumping to the outlaw Mexican League. Chandler mentioned a lifetime suspension for them, but when the penalty was reduced in 1949, Estalella came back to the majors.

Although Estalella vigorously denied it during his life, several current baseball writers now consider him to have been the first player of some African ancestry to have played in the Major Leagues in the 20th century.

== Career stats ==
In the major leagues, Estalella was a career .282 hitter with 44 home runs and 308 RBI in 680 games played. His 620 MLB hits included 106 doubles and 33 triples. He also compiled a respectable 1.423 walk-to-strikeout ratio (350-to-246) and a .383 on-base percentage. He led AL centerfielders in fielding percentage in both 1944 (.993) and 1945 (.990).

== Personal life ==
His grandson, also named Bobby Estalella, was a catcher who also played in Major League Baseball between 1996 and 2004.

Bobby Estalella died in Hialeah, Florida at the age of 79.

== See also ==
- List of Major League Baseball players from Cuba
- List of Cubans
