= Boyd Perry =

American baseball player (1914–1990)

Boyd Glenn Perry
- Short Stop and 2nd Baseman
- Born: March 21, 1914; Snow Camp, North Carolina, U.S.
- Died: June 29, 1990 (aged 76); Snow Camp, North Carolina, U.S.
- Batted: Right Threw: Right

MLB debut
- May 23, 1941, for the Detroit Tigers

Last MLB appearance
- September 20, 1941, for the Detroit Tigers

MLB statistics
- Batting average: .181
- Home runs: 0
- Runs batted in: 11
- Stats at Baseball Reference

Teams
- Detroit Tigers (1941)

Boyd Glenn Perry (March 21, 1914 – June 29, 1990) was an American infielder in Major League Baseball. He played for the Detroit Tigers.
