= Sam Lowry =

American baseball player

- Pitcher
- Born: March 25, 1920; Philadelphia, Pennsylvania, U.S.
- Died: December 1, 1992 (aged 72); Philadelphia, Pennsylvania, U.S.
- Batted: Right Threw: Right

MLB debut
- September 19, 1942, for the Philadelphia Athletics

Last MLB appearance
- October 2, 1943, for the Philadelphia Athletics

MLB statistics
- Win–loss record: 0-0
- Earned run average: 5.14
- Strikeouts: 3
- Stats at Baseball Reference

Teams
- Philadelphia Athletics (1942–1943)

Samuel Joseph Lowry (March 25, 1920 – December 1, 1992) was an American Major League Baseball pitcher. He played for the Philadelphia Athletics during the 1942 and 1943 seasons.
