= Hal Manders =

American baseball player (1917–2010)

- Pitcher
- Born: June 14, 1917; Waukee, Iowa, U.S.
- Died: January 21, 2010 (aged 92); Waukee, Iowa, U.S.
- Batted: Right Threw: Right

MLB debut
- August 12, 1941, for the Detroit Tigers

Last MLB appearance
- September 24, 1946, for the Chicago Cubs

MLB statistics
- Win–loss record: 3–1
- Earned run average: 4.77
- Strikeouts: 28
- Stats at Baseball Reference

Teams
- Detroit Tigers (1941–1942, 1946); Chicago Cubs (1946)

Harold Carl Manders (June 14, 1917 – January 21, 2010) was an American professional baseball player, a relief pitcher in Major League Baseball who appeared in 30 games for the Detroit Tigers (1941–42; 1946) and Chicago Cubs (1946).

== Biography ==
Manders was born in Waukee, Iowa. He attended the University of Iowa in Iowa City, Iowa.

Manders played in 26 games in 1941 and 1942 for the Tigers. He also played in four games in 1946, two each with the Tigers and then two with the Cubs. Listed at 6 feet (1.83 m) tall and 187 pounds (85 kg), Manders batted and threw right-handed.

In a three-season MLB career, Manders posted a 3–1 record with a 4.77 ERA in 30 appearances, including one start, giving up 37 runs (five unearned) on 71 hits and 28 walks while striking out 28 in 60 1/3 innings of work. He did not record a save.

Manders lived to be one of the oldest former Major League ballplayers, dying in Waukee, Iowa, at the age of 92. He is interred at the Waukee Cemetery.

Manders' cousin was Baseball Hall of Fame pitcher Bob Feller.
