= Moe Franklin =

American baseball player (1914–1978)

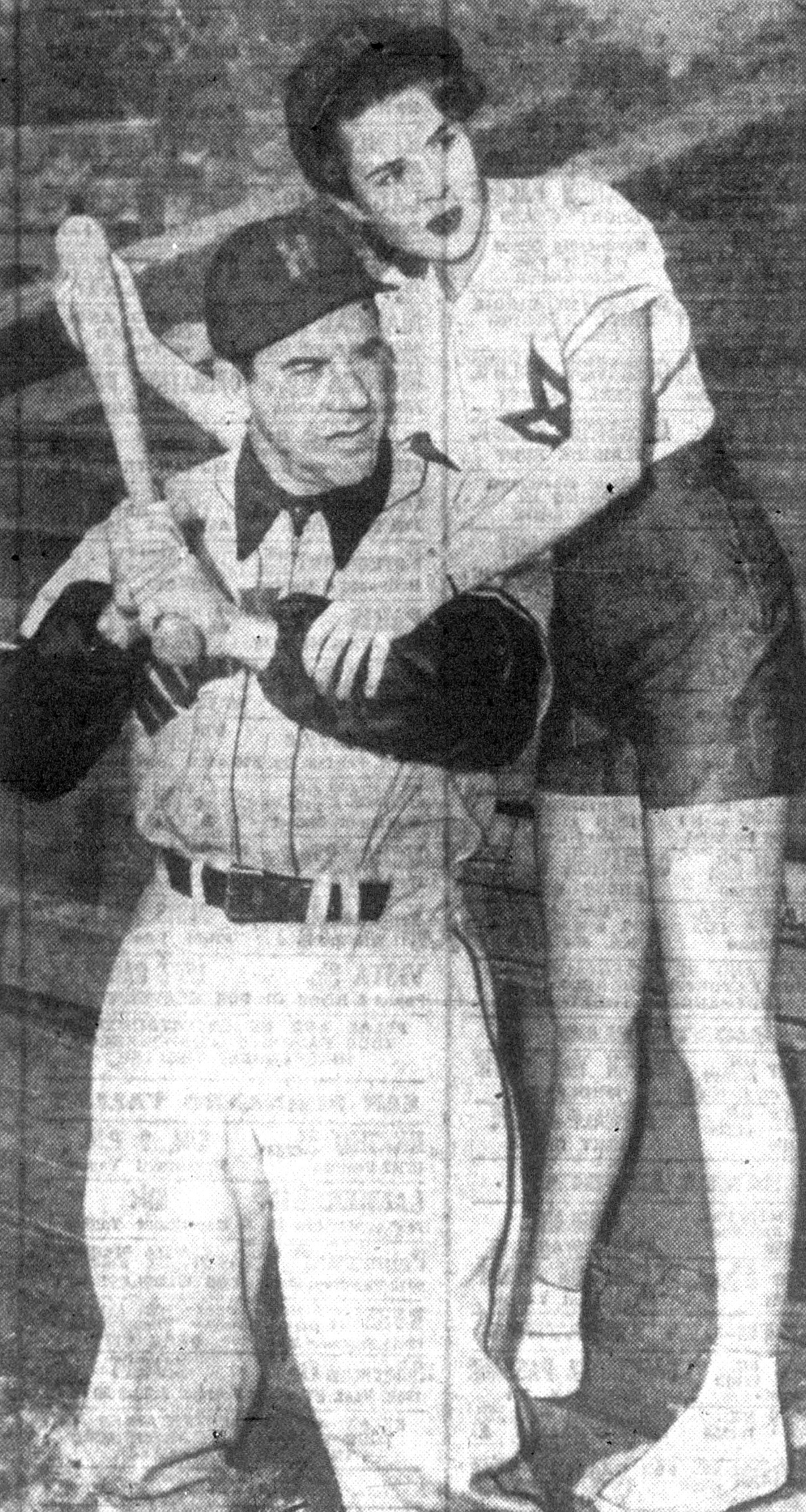
- Franklin with actress Mala Powers, circa 1951
- Shortstop
- Born: Murray Asher Franklin; April 1, 1914; Chicago, Illinois, U.S.
- Died: March 16, 1978 (aged 63); Los Angeles, California, U.S.
- Batted: Right Threw: Right

MLB debut
- August 12, 1941, for the Detroit Tigers

Last MLB appearance
- September 6, 1942, for the Detroit Tigers

MLB statistics
- Batting average: .262
- Home runs: 2
- Runs batted in: 16
- Stats at Baseball Reference

Teams
- Detroit Tigers (1941–1942)

Murray Asher Franklin (April 1, 1914 – March 16, 1978) was an American Major League Baseball shortstop who played for the Detroit Tigers in 1941 and 1942. He was one of the "jumpers" who signed with the Mexican League in 1946, earning him a temporary suspension from organized baseball.

== Biography ==
He was born in Chicago, Illinois, and was Jewish. He attended Schurz High School in Chicago, and the University of Illinois at Urbana-Champaign in Champaign, Illinois.

In the minor leagues, in 1938 he led the Mountain State League in batting (.439), triples (13; tied), home runs (26), and slugging percentage (.790). Franklin made his Major League debut on August 12, 1941 and played briefly for the rest of the season, before playing 48 games in 1942. He did not play after that, and finished his short career with 43 hits, 2 home runs, 16 RBIs and a .262 batting average.

During World War II, he served in the United States Navy, returning to civilian life in 1945.

After not being called up by the Tigers, Franklin became one of the so-called "jumpers" who signed with the Alijadores de Tampico in the Mexican League in 1946. He played two seasons with Tampico. In 1946, he batted .300 in 85 games; in 1947, he batted .213 in 46 games.

After Commissioner of Baseball Happy Chandler revoked the suspension for the jumpers in 1949, Franklin played several seasons in the Pacific Coast League, under the Brooklyn Dodgers and Chicago Cubs organizations.
