= Ned Harris =

American baseball player (1916–1976)

- Right fielder
- Born: July 9, 1916; Ames, Iowa, US
- Died: December 18, 1976 (aged 60); West Palm Beach, Florida, US
- Batted: Left Threw: Left

MLB debut
- April 20, 1941, for the Detroit Tigers

Last MLB appearance
- April 28, 1946, for the Detroit Tigers

MLB statistics
- Batting average: .259
- Home runs: 16
- Runs batted in: 81
- Stats at Baseball Reference

Teams
- Detroit Tigers (1941–43, 1946)

Robert Ned Harris (July 9, 1916 – December 12, 1976) was a Major League Baseball outfielder. He played all or part of four seasons in the majors, between 1941 and 1946, with the Detroit Tigers. In 1942 and 1943, he was the Tigers' primary right fielder.

In 262 games, Harris posted a .259 batting average (211-for-814) with 107 runs, 16 home runs, 81 RBI and 102 bases on balls.
