= Tony Criscola =

American baseball player (1915–2001)

- Outfielder
- Born: July 9, 1915; Walla Walla, Washington, U.S.
- Died: July 10, 2001 (aged 86); La Jolla, California, U.S.
- Batted: Left Threw: Right

MLB debut
- April 15, 1942, for the St. Louis Browns

Last MLB appearance
- September 30, 1944, for the Cincinnati Reds

MLB statistics
- Batting average: .248
- Home runs: 1
- Runs batted in: 28
- Stats at Baseball Reference

Teams
- St. Louis Browns (1942–1943); Cincinnati Reds (1944)

Anthony Paul Criscola (July 9, 1915 – July 10, 2001) was an American Major League Baseball outfielder who played for the St. Louis Browns (1942–1943) and Cincinnati Reds (1944) and San Diego Padres. He was a native of Walla Walla, Washington. He was a graduate of Walla High School and attended Witman Collage on a track scholarship. Witman College is where he was scouted and recruited to steal bases primally. He is notable as the only major leaguer to come from Witman College.

He hit very well in his 91 games in 1942, going 47-for-158, a .297 batting average. He didn't fare as well in 1943 and 1944, hitting a combined .211 in 93 games. He was known as a speedy outfielder and base stealer. An injury to his arm, that did not heal correctly, ended his career. He settled in Pacific Beach San Diego, CA. He built Criscola Liquors which he successfully ran until retirement.

Career totals include a batting average of .248, 1 home run, 28 runs batted in, 35 runs, and an on-base percentage of .307. He was used many times as a pinch-hitter during his 3-year MLB career.

Criscola died in La Jolla, California at the age of 86.
