= Ken Richardson (baseball) =

American baseball player (1915-1987)

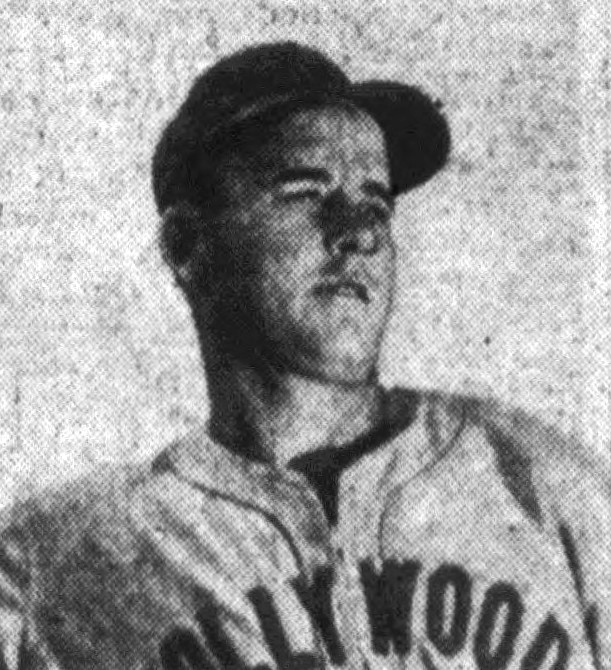
- Richardson, circa 1946
- Infielder/Outfielder
- Born: May 2, 1915; Orleans, Indiana, U.S.
- Died: December 7, 1987 (aged 72); Woodland Hills, California, U.S.
- Batted: Right Threw: Right

MLB debut
- April 14, 1942, for the Philadelphia Athletics

Last MLB appearance
- May 2, 1946, for the Philadelphia Phillies

MLB statistics
- Batting average: .114
- Home runs: 0
- Runs batted in: 2
- Stats at Baseball Reference

Teams
- Philadelphia Athletics (1942); Philadelphia Phillies (1946)

Kenneth Franklin Richardson (May 2, 1915 – December 7, 1987) was an American professional baseball player who spent 21 seasons in minor league baseball, interrupted by two, six-game Major League trials with the Philadelphia Athletics (1942) and Philadelphia Phillies (1946). He played six games for each team, collecting four hits, including one double. However, in the minors (1934–1946; 1948–1955) he played in 2,336 games, with his 2,168 hits including 222 home runs.

Born in Orleans, Indiana, Richardson threw and batted right-handed. A second baseman, third baseman and outfielder, he stood 5 feet 10 inches (1.78 m) tall and weighed 187 pounds (85 kg). Both of his MLB stints occurred in early-season trials; he had one single (off Charlie Wagner of the Boston Red Sox) in 15 at bats for the 1942 Athletics, and three hits (including his double off Kirby Higbe of the Brooklyn Dodgers) in 20 at bats for the 1946 Phillies.

Richardson played in the top-level Pacific Coast League for all or parts of eight seasons. In his 60s, he returned to baseball as a minor league manager in 1976 and from 1978 to 1981, spending the latter four seasons in the Milwaukee Brewers organization.
