= Bobby Estalella (catcher) =

American baseball player (born 1974)

- Catcher
- Born: August 23, 1974 (age 52); Hialeah, Florida, U.S.
- Batted: Right Threw: Right

MLB debut
- September 17, 1996, for the Philadelphia Phillies

Last MLB appearance
- June 6, 2004, for the Toronto Blue Jays

MLB statistics
- Batting average: .216
- Home runs: 48
- Runs batted in: 147
- Stats at Baseball Reference

Teams
- Philadelphia Phillies (1996–1999); San Francisco Giants (2000–2001); New York Yankees (2001); Colorado Rockies (2002–2003); Arizona Diamondbacks (2004); Toronto Blue Jays (2004)

Robert M. Estalella [es-tah-LAY-yah] (born August 23, 1974) is an American former professional baseball catcher, who played in Major League Baseball (MLB) from 1996 to 2004. His name is similar to that of his grandfather, Bobby Estalella (1911 – 1991), a Cuban professional baseball outfielder who played in the big leagues between 1935 and 1949.

== Baseball career ==
In nine seasons, Estalella played for the Philadelphia Phillies (1996–1999), San Francisco Giants (2000–2001), New York Yankees (2001), Colorado Rockies (2002–2003), Arizona Diamondbacks (2004) and Toronto Blue Jays (2004). Estalella was a career .216 hitter with 48 home runs and 147 RBI in 310 games. In May 2000 he hit the first grand slam at the Giants' Pac Bell Park, which had opened earlier that season.

He was signed by the Cincinnati Reds to a minor league contract before the 2005 season but chose free-agency during spring training. He was signed by the New York Mets to a minor league contract before the 2006 season, but elected free agency as he re-injured his shoulder and elbow before the season began requiring surgery. In August 2010 he had hip surgery and was denied the opportunity to rejoin a team after extensive rehab.

Estalella holds the distinction of having hit the most career home runs in MLB history by a player who also had fewer than 200 career hits. (48 HR; 195H)

== BALCO scandal ==
Estalella was linked to the BALCO steroids scandal through leaked testimony. On December 13, 2007, he was named in the Mitchell Report to the Commissioner of Baseball of an Independent Investigation Into the Illegal Use of Steroids and Other Performance Enhancing Substances by Players in Major League Baseball. On January 29, 2009, it was reported Estalella would not be testifying against Barry Bonds in the federal perjury case against Bonds.

== See also ==
- List of Major League Baseball players named in the Mitchell Report
