= Earl Cook =

American baseball player (1908–1996)

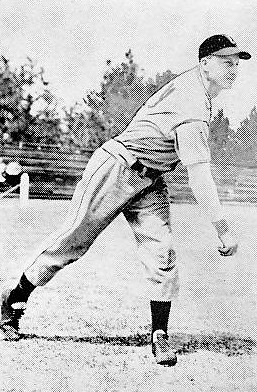
- Cook in 1940
- Pitcher
- Born: December 10, 1908; Stouffville, Ontario, Canada
- Died: November 21, 1996 (aged 87); Markham, Ontario, Canada
- Batted: Right Threw: Right

MLB debut
- September 12, 1941, for the Detroit Tigers

Last MLB appearance
- September 12, 1941, for the Detroit Tigers

MLB statistics
- Win–loss record: 0-0
- Earned run average: 4.50
- Strikeouts: 1
- Stats at Baseball Reference

Teams
- Detroit Tigers (1941)

Earl Davis Cook (December 10, 1908 – November 21, 1996) was a relief pitcher in Major League Baseball who played briefly for the Detroit Tigers during the 1941 season. Listed at 6' 0", 195 lb., Cook batted and threw right-handed. In one game appearance, Cook posted a 4.50 ERA with one strikeout in 2.0 innings of work.

Born in Stouffville, Ontario, Cook died in Markham, Ontario in 1996.

== Sources ==
- Career statistics from Baseball Reference
