= Ted Sepkowski =

American baseball player (1923–2002)

- Utilityman
- Born: November 9, 1923; Baltimore, Maryland, U.S.
- Died: March 8, 2002 (aged 78); Severna Park, Maryland, U.S.
- Batted: Right Threw: Right

MLB debut
- September 9, 1942, for the Cleveland Indians

Last MLB appearance
- June 21, 1947, for the New York Yankees

MLB statistics
- Batting average: .231
- Home runs: 0
- Runs batted in: 1
- Stats at Baseball Reference

Teams
- Cleveland Indians (1942; 1946–1947); New York Yankees (1947)

Theodore Walter Sepkowski, born Szepkowski (November 9, 1923 – March 8, 2002) was an American professional baseball player.

Born in Baltimore, Maryland, he played outfield and three infield positions as a minor leaguer, and appeared in 19 Major League Baseball games as a utility player for the Cleveland Indians (1942; 1946–1947) and New York Yankees (1947). He batted and threw right-handed and was listed at 5 ft 11 in (1.80 m) and 190 lb (86 kg).

Sepkowski's active career extended from 1942–1955, with the 1943–1945 seasons missed because of service in the United States Coast Guard during World War II. He broke into the game with his hometown Baltimore Orioles of the International League, then a Cleveland farm club, and saw his first action in the Majors on September 9, 1942, when he was Cleveland's starting second baseman in a 5–4 defeat at the hands of the Philadelphia Athletics. Sepkowski collected his first MLB hit in five at bats that day but made two errors in the field.

He spent most of 1946 with the Double-A Oklahoma City Indians before another late-season recall, then started 1947 with Cleveland before his contract was sold to the Yankees on June 3. He appeared in two games for the Yanks as a pinch runner, then returned to the minors for the remainder of his career. As a Major Leaguer he appeared as a third baseman and second baseman for two games each, and as a right fielder in one contest. His six MLB hits included two doubles.
