= Don Ross (baseball) =

American baseball player (1914–1996)

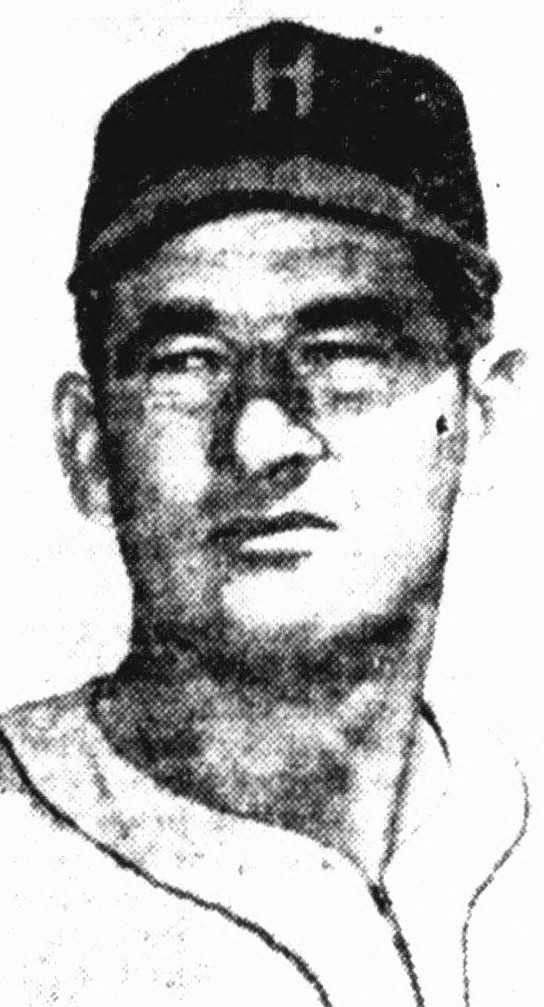
- Ross, circa 1948
- Third baseman, outfielder
- Born: July 16, 1914; Pasadena, California, U.S.
- Died: March 28, 1996 (aged 81); Arcadia, California, U.S.
- Batted: Right Threw: Right

MLB debut
- April 19, 1938, for the Detroit Tigers

Last MLB appearance
- September 22, 1946, for the Cleveland Indians

MLB statistics
- Batting average: .262
- Home runs: 12
- Runs batted in: 162
- Stats at Baseball Reference

Teams
- Detroit Tigers (1938); Brooklyn Dodgers (1940); Detroit Tigers (1942–1945); Cleveland Indians (1945–1946)

Donald Raymond Ross (July 16, 1914 – March 28, 1996) was an American professional baseball third baseman and outfielder. He played in Major League Baseball (MLB) for the Detroit Tigers, Brooklyn Dodgers, and Cleveland Indians.

== Early years ==
Ross was born in 1914 in Pasadena, California, and attended Pasadena City College.

== Professional baseball ==
Ross began playing professional baseball in 1933 with Shreveport in the Dixie League. He advanced to Beaumont in the Texas League in 1934 and 1935. He split the 1936 season between Beaumont, Buffalo, and Toronto. He remained with Toronto in 1937.

He made his major league debut with the Tigers on April 19, 1938. He replaced Marv Owen as the Tigers' third baseman. He was the team's starting third baseman for 73 games in 1938. In 632 innings played, he compiled a .946 fielding percentage with 90 putouts, 157 assists, 14 errors, and 15 double plays in 261 chances.

On September 14, 1938, the Brooklyn Dodgers purchased Ross and Ray Hayworth from the Tigers. He played only 10 games for Brooklyn and not until the 1940 season. He appeared in 388 games for the Montreal Royals, mostly at third base, during the 1939, 1940, and 1941 seasons.

At the end of the 1941 season, the Tigers reclaimed Ross in the Rule 5 draft. He was converted into an outfielder in his second stint with the Tigers. He was used principally as a right fielder, starting 31 games at the position in 1942, 31 in 1943, and 35 in 1944.

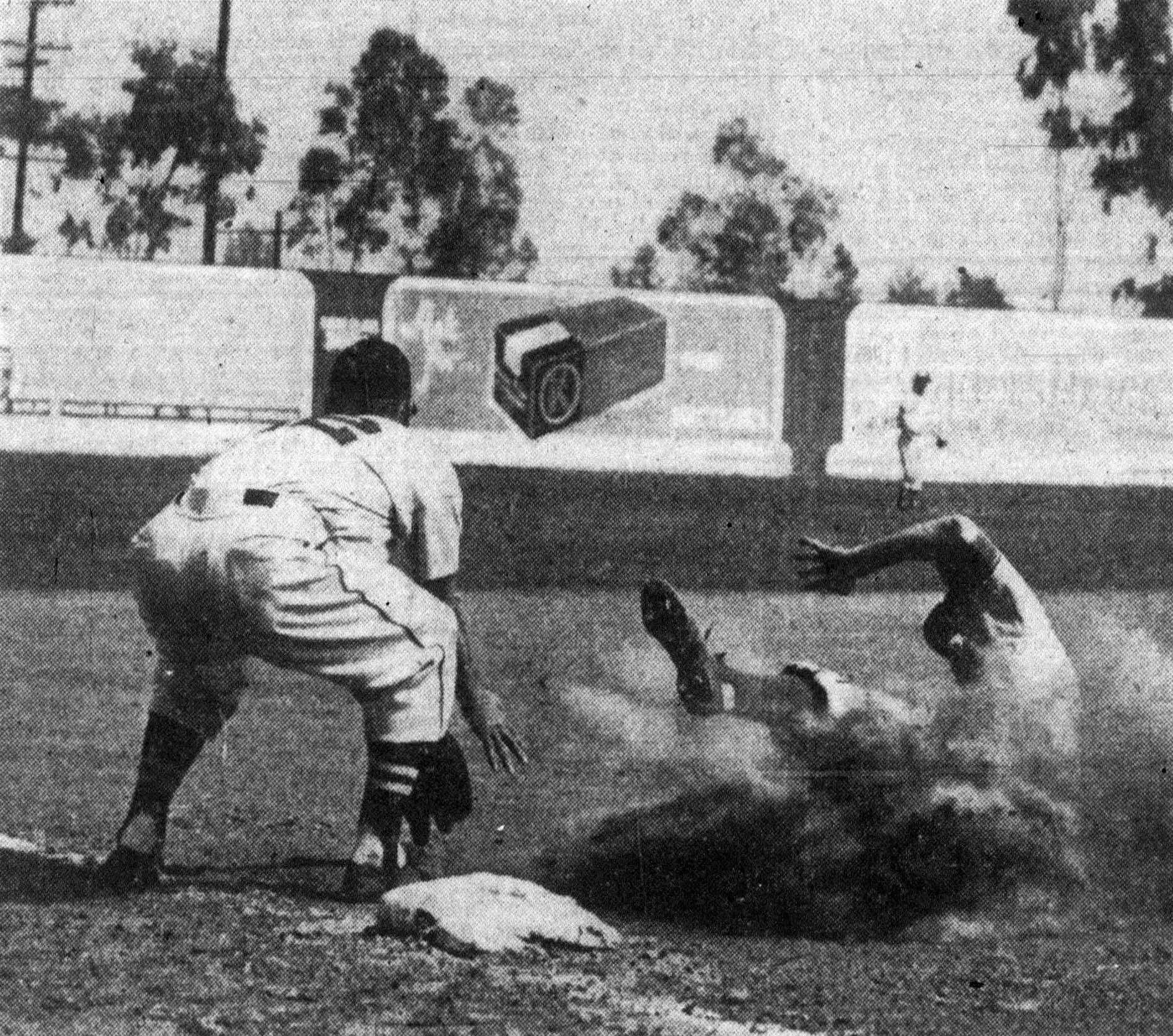
Ross (left), as member of the Hollywood Stars, anticipates the throw as Seattle Rainiers player Dick Gyselman (right) slides in feet first to third base at Gilmore Stadium in Los Angeles, California on September 7, 1947.

On April 29, 1945, the Tigers traded Ross and Dutch Meyer to the Cleveland Indians in exchange for Roy Cullenbine. He appeared in 161 games with Cleveland during the 1945 and 1946 seasons, including 138 games as the Indians' starting third baseman. During his time with Cleveland, he compiled a 264 batting average and .340 on-base percentage. He appeared in his last major league game on September 22, 1946.

Ross played for the Hollywood Stars in the Pacific Coast League during the 1947 and 1948 seasons. He appeared in 245 games at third base for the Stars. He concluded his playing career playing for the San Antonio Missions and Greensboro Patriots during the 1949 season.

Ross played in 498 major league games, 261 as a third baseman, 115 as an outfielder, 20 as a shortstop and 7 as a second baseman. Ross had a career batting average of .262 and an on-base percentage of .338. He had 390 career hits, 129 runs scored, 162 RBIs, 166 bases on balls, and 79 extra-base hits.

== Later years ==
Ross died in 1996 at age 81 in Arcadia, California. He was buried at Resurrection Cemetery in Montebello, California.
