= Dick Adkins =

American baseball player (1920-1955)

- Shortstop
- Born: March 3, 1920; Electra, Texas, U.S.
- Died: September 12, 1955 (aged 35); Electra, Texas, U.S.
- Batted: Right Threw: Right

MLB debut
- September 19, 1942, for the Philadelphia Athletics

Last MLB appearance
- September 20, 1942, for the Philadelphia Athletics

MLB statistics
- Batting average: .143
- Home runs: 0
- Runs batted in: 0
- Stats at Baseball Reference

Teams
- Philadelphia Athletics (1942)

Richard Earl Adkins (March 3, 1920 – September 12, 1955) was an American professional baseball player. He was a shortstop for one season (1942) with the Philadelphia Athletics. For his career, he compiled a .143 batting average in 7 at-bats.

He was born and later died in Electra, Texas at the age of 35 after a short battle with brain cancer.
