= Bob Patrick =

American baseball player (1917–1999)

- Outfielder
- Born: October 27, 1917; Fort Smith, Arkansas, U.S.
- Died: October 6, 1999 (aged 81); Fort Smith, Arkansas, U.S.
- Batted: Right Threw: Right

MLB debut
- September 20, 1941, for the Detroit Tigers

Last MLB appearance
- April 26, 1942, for the Detroit Tigers

MLB statistics
- Batting average: .267
- Home runs: 1
- Runs batted in: 3
- Stats at Baseball Reference

Teams
- Detroit Tigers (1941–1942)

Robert Lee Patrick (October 27, 1917 – October 6, 1999) was an American Major League Baseball outfielder. He played parts of two seasons in the major leagues, 1941 and 1942 for the Detroit Tigers. He appeared in nine games, going 4-for-15 at the plate.

His career was interrupted by World War II. He served in the U.S. Army attaining the rank of Staff Sergeant.
