= Rip Radcliff =

American baseball player (1906–1962)

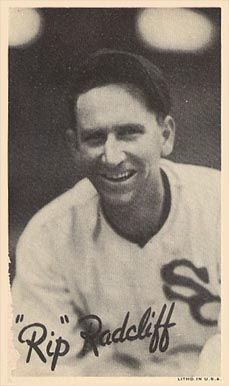
- Left fielder
- Born: January 19, 1906; Kiowa, Oklahoma, U.S.
- Died: May 23, 1962 (aged 56); Enid, Oklahoma, U.S.
- Batted: Left Threw: Left

MLB debut
- September 17, 1934, for the Chicago White Sox

Last MLB appearance
- September 29, 1943, for the Detroit Tigers

MLB statistics
- Batting average: .311
- Home runs: 42
- Runs batted in: 533
- Stats at Baseball Reference

Teams
- Chicago White Sox (1934–1939); St. Louis Browns (1940–1941); Detroit Tigers (1941–1943)

Career highlights and awards
- All-Star (1936)

Raymond Allen Radcliff (January 19, 1906 – May 23, 1962) was an American professional baseball outfielder and first baseman in Major League Baseball who appeared in 1,081 games over ten seasons for the Chicago White Sox (1934–1939), St. Louis Browns (1940–1941) and Detroit Tigers (1941–1943). Born in Kiowa, Oklahoma, he threw and batted left-handed and was listed as 5 feet 10 inches (1.78 m) tall and 170 pounds (77 kg).

Radcliff entered baseball in 1928 and joined the White Sox in September 1934 after seven prolific seasons in the minor leagues. He was known for his ability to make contact, striking out only once every 29 at bats. He batted .300 five times in his career and was a member of the American League squad for the 1936 Major League Baseball All-Star Game. On July 18, 1936, Radcliff went 6–for–7 with 4 runs and 4 RBI in a 21–14 win against the Philadelphia Athletics. He had 200+ hit seasons in 1936 and 1940. His best season came in 1942 when he hit .342 and finished ninth in American League MVP voting.

During his ten-year career, Radcliff compiled a .311 batting average (1,267–4,074) with 42 home runs and 533 RBI. His career numbers include 598 runs scored, 205 doubles, 50 triples, 40 stolen bases, and 310 walks for a .362 on-base percentage and .417 slugging percentage. Defensively, he recorded a .971 fielding percentage playing at left and right field and first base.

After retiring from baseball, Radcliff was employed by a road machinery company, and died of a suspected heart attack at his Enid home in 1962.

== See also ==
- List of Major League Baseball single-game hits leaders
