= Eric McNair =

American baseball player (1909–1949)

- Infielder
- Born: April 12, 1909; Meridian, Mississippi, U.S.
- Died: March 11, 1949 (aged 39); Meridian, Mississippi, U.S.
- Batted: Right Threw: Right

MLB debut
- September 20, 1929, for the Philadelphia Athletics

Last MLB appearance
- September 19, 1942, for the Philadelphia Athletics

MLB statistics
- Batting average: .274
- Home runs: 82
- Runs batted in: 633
- Stats at Baseball Reference

Teams
- Philadelphia Athletics (1929–1935); Boston Red Sox (1936–1938); Chicago White Sox (1939–1940); Detroit Tigers (1941–1942); Philadelphia Athletics (1942)

Career highlights and awards
- World Series champion (1930)

Donald Eric McNair (April 12, 1909 – March 11, 1949) was an American professional baseball shortstop in Major League Baseball from 1929 to 1942. He played for the Philadelphia Athletics, Boston Red Sox, Detroit Tigers, and Chicago White Sox. McNair became an everyday player with Philadelphia in 1932, and he led the league in doubles that season. After his playing days, McNair had brief tenures as a minor-league manager and as a baseball scout. He died of heart problems at age 39.

== Early life ==
McNair grew up in Meridian, Mississippi, and he grew up playing sandlot baseball on field in the backyard of Johnson Moss, a man who had become well known in Meridian for his success in the cotton business. Moss also controlled organized local youth and adult teams in Meridian, and McNair played well enough that Moss got him on a youth team and then onto the local adult team, the Moss Specials. McNair then played for the Meridian team in the Cotton States League.

== Career ==
McNair spent much of 1929 with minor-league teams in Memphis and Knoxville. Late in the year, he was called up to the Philadelphia Athletics. The team went to the World Series that year, but McNair had been called up too late to be included in the World Series roster. Connie Mack and John Shibe arranged for McNair to serve as an usher so that he could watch his team play. McNair said that he had great difficulty directing fans to their seats, so he ultimately took off his badge and sat in an aisle to watch the games. The Athletics won that series four games to one.

In 1932, his first season as a major league regular, McNair led the American League in doubles with 47. He struggled in the infield during the early part of that season, often committing two errors in the same game. Manager Jimmy Dykes helped him to relax and to forget about errors after they happened, which led to better overall fielding.

McNair was a member of a 1934 All-American team that toured China, Japan and the Philippines, playing against teams in those countries. McNair recalled that the series in Japan was particularly popular: After 75,000 people attended each of the first four games, the Japanese government cancelled the fifth game out of concern that too many people were neglecting their work.

In 1936, for reasons that are still unknown, McNair wore uniform number 4 rather than his previous number 6 jersey. Player-manager Joe Cronin wore number 4 for the Red Sox in every other season between 1935 and 1945; the Red Sox later retired Cronin's number.

In a 14-year, 1251-game career, McNair compiled a .274 batting average (1240-for-4519) with 592 runs, 229 doubles, 29 triples, 82 home runs, 633 RBI and 261 bases on balls. He recorded a .950 fielding percentage as an infielder.

== Personal life ==
McNair was nicknamed "Rabbit" or "Boob", a play on the name of the title character of the Rube Goldberg comic strip Boob McNutt.

In 1937, McNair's first wife died in childbirth. McNair's brother Ralph was a police officer in Meridian who also played minor-league baseball.

== Death ==
In 1948, McNair served as manager of the Class A Savannah Indians, a South Atlantic League farm club of the Philadelphia Athletics. He suffered from heart problems in the middle of that season. After the season was over, the Athletics moved him into a scouting role. However, before he got much opportunity to serve in that role, McNair died of a heart attack on March 11, 1949. In 1963, McNair was posthumously inducted into the Mississippi Sports Hall of Fame.

== See also ==
- List of Major League Baseball annual doubles leaders
