= Hal White =

American baseball player (1919–2001)

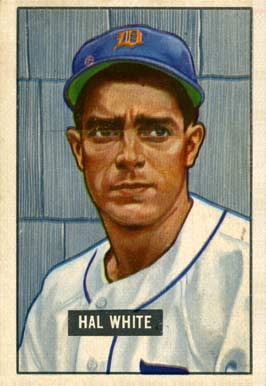
- Pitcher
- Born: March 18, 1919; Utica, New York, U.S.
- Died: April 21, 2001 (aged 82); Venice, Florida, U.S.
- Batted: Right Threw: Right

MLB debut
- April 22, 1941, for the Detroit Tigers

Last MLB appearance
- May 4, 1954, for the St. Louis Cardinals

MLB statistics
- Win–loss record: 46–54
- Earned run average: 3.78
- Strikeouts: 349
- Stats at Baseball Reference

Teams
- Detroit Tigers (1941–1943, 1946–1952); St. Louis Browns (1953); St. Louis Cardinals (1953–1954)

Harold George White (March 18, 1919 – April 21, 2001) was an American professional baseball player. He was a right-handed pitcher for the Detroit Tigers (1941–43 and 1946–52), St. Louis Browns (1953) and St. Louis Cardinals (1953–1954).

Born in Utica, New York, he was listed at 5 ft 10 in (1.78 m) and 165 lb (75 kg). His father, a railroad conductor, taught him to pitch at a young age. He attended Kernan Grammar School in Utica and Utica Free Academy until dropping out to play for a team in Rome, New York in 1937. White served in the United States Navy in the Pacific Theater of Operations during World War II. During his baseball career, he worked in Rome for Revere Copper.

In twelve seasons, White had a 46–54 win–loss record, 336 games (67 started), 23 complete games, 7 shutouts, 144 games finished, 25 saves, 920 1/3 innings pitched, 875 hits allowed, 443 runs allowed, 387 earned runs allowed, 47 home runs allowed, 450 walks allowed, 349 strikeouts, 14 hit batsmen, 20 wild pitches, 3,986 batters faced, 2 balks, and a 3.78 ERA.

White died in Venice, Florida at the age of 82 of a stroke while being catheterized in a local hospital. A veteran, he was buried at Sarasota National Cemetery in Sarasota County, Florida.
