= Jack Zeller =

American baseball executive

- Born: John Augustus Zeller; September 11, 1883; St. Louis, Missouri, U.S.
- Died: February 18, 1969 (aged 85); Glendale, Arizona, U.S.
- Occupation: Baseball executive

John Augustus Zeller (September 11, 1883 – February 18, 1969) was an American baseball executive and minor league player. He served as General Manager (GM) of the Detroit Tigers of Major League Baseball from 1938 through 1945.

== Career ==
Zeller was born in St. Louis, Missouri, to German emigrants. He only began his baseball career in 1901 playing at Forest Park in St. Louis. A pitcher, he joined the semi-pro Trolley League and then in 1903 the Missouri Valley League, playing for the Joplin Miners in Joplin and Sedalia Gold Bugs in Sedalia. After playing in Colorado and New York, in 1905, he moved up to the minor league, playing for Haverhill in the New England League. After an arm injury, he was quickly released by the team and went back to New York, where he played first base and managed Bath Beach, an independent team in Brooklyn that played on Sunday.

After three years there, he purchased half of the Springfield Ponies in the Connecticut League. As manager, he led the team to the league pennant in 1911. As the league had three teams from Massachusetts, he led the charge to have the league renamed.

In 1912, he sold his interest in Springfield and bought the Pittsfield Electrics of the same league. He served as president, secretary and manager until 1915, when play was suspended during World War I. He sold his interest in the club to the league in 1916, which merged with the Connecticut League to form the Eastern League. He attempted to develop a new league in Massachusetts in 1916.

After the U.S. entered the war in 1917, Zeller enlisted in the Army as a private. After attending the Officers Training Camp, he was promoted to sergeant and then commissioned a 2nd Lieutenant in 1918. He did not see action but served as a bayonet instructor before being discharged in 1919, when he moved to Texas to work in the oil fields.

Zeller joined the Detroit Tigers of the American League in 1925 as a scout. Zeller served as a scout and supervisor in the Tigers organization from 1938 through 1941. He was appointed GM of the Tigers in 1938, succeeding Mickey Cochrane. He is credited with developing the Tigers' minor league baseball organization. Following an investigation, the Tigers were found to be in violation of the minor league working agreement in 1940, resulting in 91 players being declared free agents by Commissioner of Baseball Kenesaw Mountain Landis. Zeller took full responsibility. Zeller then began to sell off the Tigers' farm teams. He began to believe that the farm system needed to be completely overhauled. In 1944, he proposed a new draft that would end the minor league system, replacing it with "baseball schools".

Zeller stepped down as Tigers' GM in 1945. He was succeeded by George Trautman. Upon leaving the Tigers, he moved to Fort Worth, Texas, where he served as a scout for the East Texas League and Evangeline Baseball League. In 1947, he joined the Boston Braves as their chief scout.

== Personal ==
Zeller died of a heart condition in 1969 at the age of 85.
