= Mike Chartak =

American baseball player (1916-1967)

- Right fielder / First baseman
- Born: April 28, 1916; Brooklyn, New York, U.S.
- Died: July 25, 1967 (aged 51); Cedar Rapids, Iowa, U.S.
- Batted: Left Threw: Left

MLB debut
- September 13, 1940, for the New York Yankees

Last MLB appearance
- September 27, 1944, for the St. Louis Browns

MLB statistics
- Batting average: .243
- Home runs: 21
- Runs batted in: 98
- Stats at Baseball Reference

Teams
- New York Yankees (1940, 1942); Washington Senators (1942); St. Louis Browns (1942–1944)

Michael George Chartak (April 28, 1916 – July 25, 1967) was an American professional baseball outfielder. He played in Major League Baseball (MLB) for the New York Yankees (1940, 1942), Washington Senators (1942), and St. Louis Browns (1942–1944).

Chartak was born in 1916, in Brooklyn, New York, and grew up in Carbondale, Pennsylvania. Mike played four seasons in the major leagues: 1940 with the New York Yankees; 1942 with the Yankees, Washington Senators, and St. Louis Browns; and 1943–1944 with the Browns. In his major league career, Chartak appeared in 256 games and had 186 hits, including 21 home runs, in 765 at bats. He appeared as a pinch hitter in two games of the 1944 World Series, the second appearance resulting in a strikeout to end the sixth and final game. His strikeout that ended the 1944 World Series was the last at-bat of his career. In the offseason, during a preinduction military examination, spots were found on his lungs that turned out to be tuberculosis. He was sent to a sanatorium, where he would spend most of his remaining life.

He died of tuberculosis on July 25, 1967, in Cedar Rapids, Iowa at the age of 51.
