= 1942 Major League Baseball season =

1942 MLB season
- League: American League (AL); National League (NL)
- Sport: Baseball
- Duration: Regular season: April 14 – September 27, 1942; World Series: September 30 – October 5, 1942
- Games: 154
- Teams: 16 (8 per league)

Regular season
- Season MVP: AL: Joe Gordon (NYY); NL: Mort Cooper (STL)
- AL champions: New York Yankees
- AL runners-up: Boston Red Sox
- NL champions: St. Louis Cardinals
- NL runners-up: Brooklyn Dodgers

World Series
- Champions: St. Louis Cardinals
- Runners-up: New York Yankees

MLB seasons
- ← 1941 1943 →

Locations of teams for the 1942–1953 American League seasons
American League
Locations of teams for the 1942 National League season
National League

The 1942 major league baseball season began on April 14, 1942. The regular season ended on September 27, with the St. Louis Cardinals and New York Yankees as the regular season champions of the National League and American League, respectively. The postseason began with Game 1 of the 39th World Series on September 30 and ended with Game 5 on October 5. In the third iteration of this World Series matchup, the Cardinals defeated the Yankees, four games to one, capturing their fourth championship in franchise history, since their previous in 1934. Going into the season, the defending World Series champions were the New York Yankees from the 1941 season.

The 10th All-Star Game was played on July 6 at the Polo Grounds in New York, New York, home of the New York Giants. The American League won, 3–1.

In the National League, the Brooklyn Dodgers had a record of 104–50, but finished two games behind the Cardinals; the Dodgers tied the 1909 Chicago Cubs, who had a record of 104–49, for the most wins in an MLB regular season without reaching the postseason.

The Philadelphia Athletics set a record for the fewest runs batted in during a season, with only 354.

The St. Louis Browns nearly moved to Los Angeles, California for the start of the 1942 season. During the 1941 Winter Meetings in Chicago, Illinois, a vote was scheduled for the morning of December 8, and was expected to be approved. However, due to the attack on Pearl Harbor by Japan the previous day (and subsequent entry of the United States into World War II), when it came time to vote, all teams (including the Browns) unanimously voted against the move. The team would eventually leave for Baltimore, Maryland in 1954 where they remain today as the Baltimore Orioles, while Los Angeles would eventually get a major league team in 1958 when the Dodgers moved from Brooklyn, New York.

== Schedule ==
The 1942 schedule consisted of 154 games for all teams in the American League and National League, each of which had eight teams. Each team was scheduled to play 22 games against the other seven teams of their respective league. This continued the format put in place since the 1904 season (except for 1919) and would be used until 1961 in the American League and 1962 in the National League.

Opening Day, April 16, featured all sixteen teams, the first since the 1940 season. The final day of the regular season was on September 27 and featured ten teams. The World Series took place between September 30 and October 5.

== Rule changes ==
The 1942 season saw the following rule changes:

- Any player drafted for World War II would be regarded as voluntarily retired, though placed on a separate list.
- Regarding doubleheaders:
  - It was made official that both St. Louis teams could schedule doubleheaders after the third Sunday home game (as opposed to the other fourteen teams, who must wait until after the fourth home Sunday game).
  - Regularly scheduled games could not be pushed back to the final series of the season for the purpose of causing a doubleheader.
- If the postponement of a contest requires transfer between cities, a game cannot be called off less than one hour before the game’s scheduled start time.
- In the American League, a rule that was previously implemented for the 1940 season, which limited a defending champion team from trading with other American League teams, except through waivers, was repealed.
- The number of night games allowed per team was increased from 7 to 14 (with the Washington Senators allowed 21).

== Teams ==
An asterisk (*) denotes the ballpark a team played the minority of their home games at

League	Team	City	Ballpark	Capacity	Manager
American League	Boston Red Sox	Boston, Massachusetts	Fenway Park	33,817	Joe Cronin
American League	Chicago White Sox	Chicago, Illinois	Comiskey Park	50,000	Jimmy Dykes
American League	Cleveland Indians	Cleveland, Ohio	Cleveland Stadium	78,811	Lou Boudreau
American League	Cleveland Indians	Cleveland, Ohio	League Park*	22,500*	Lou Boudreau
American League	Detroit Tigers	Detroit, Michigan	Briggs Stadium	58,000	Del Baker
American League	New York Yankees	New York, New York	Yankee Stadium	70,000	Joe McCarthy
American League	Philadelphia Athletics	Philadelphia, Pennsylvania	Shibe Park	33,000	Connie Mack
American League	St. Louis Browns	St. Louis, Missouri	Sportsman's Park	34,023	Luke Sewell
American League	Washington Senators	Washington, D.C.	Griffith Stadium	32,000	Bucky Harris
National League	Boston Braves	Boston, Massachusetts	Braves Field	37,746	Casey Stengel
National League	Brooklyn Dodgers	New York, New York	Ebbets Field	35,000	Leo Durocher
National League	Chicago Cubs	Chicago, Illinois	Wrigley Field	38,396	Jimmie Wilson
National League	Cincinnati Reds	Cincinnati, Ohio	Crosley Field	29,401	Bill McKechnie
National League	New York Giants	New York, New York	Polo Grounds	56,000	Mel Ott
National League	Philadelphia Phils	Philadelphia, Pennsylvania	Shibe Park	33,000	Hans Lobert
National League	Pittsburgh Pirates	Pittsburgh, Pennsylvania	Forbes Field	33,467	Frankie Frisch
National League	St. Louis Cardinals	St. Louis, Missouri	Sportsman's Park	34,023	Billy Southworth

== Standings ==
=== American League ===
American League
Team	W	L	Pct.	GB	Home	Road
New York Yankees	103	51	.669	—	58‍–‍19	45‍–‍32
Boston Red Sox	93	59	.612	9	53‍–‍24	40‍–‍35
St. Louis Browns	82	69	.543	19½	40‍–‍37	42‍–‍32
Cleveland Indians	75	79	.487	28	39‍–‍39	36‍–‍40
Detroit Tigers	73	81	.474	30	43‍–‍34	30‍–‍47
Chicago White Sox	66	82	.446	34	35‍–‍35	31‍–‍47
Washington Senators	62	89	.411	39½	35‍–‍42	27‍–‍47
Philadelphia Athletics	55	99	.357	48	25‍–‍51	30‍–‍48

=== National League ===
National League
Team	W	L	Pct.	GB	Home	Road
St. Louis Cardinals	106	48	.688	—	60‍–‍17	46‍–‍31
Brooklyn Dodgers	104	50	.675	2	57‍–‍22	47‍–‍28
New York Giants	85	67	.559	20	47‍–‍31	38‍–‍36
Cincinnati Reds	76	76	.500	29	38‍–‍39	38‍–‍37
Pittsburgh Pirates	66	81	.449	36½	41‍–‍34	25‍–‍47
Chicago Cubs	68	86	.442	38	36‍–‍41	32‍–‍45
Boston Braves	59	89	.399	44	33‍–‍36	26‍–‍53
Philadelphia Phils	42	109	.278	62½	23‍–‍51	19‍–‍58

=== Tie games ===
9 tie games (2 in AL, 7 in NL), which are not factored into winning percentage or games behind (and were often replayed again) occurred throughout the season.

==== American League ====
- Cleveland Indians, 2
- Detroit Tigers, 2

==== National League ====
- Boston Braves, 2
- Brooklyn Dodgers, 1
- Chicago Cubs, 1
- Cincinnati Reds, 2
- New York Giants, 2
- Pittsburgh Pirates, 4
- St. Louis Cardinals, 2

== Postseason ==
The postseason began on September 30 and ended on October 5 with the St. Louis Cardinals defeating the New York Yankees in the 1942 World Series in five games.

=== Bracket ===
World Series
AL	New York Yankees	1
NL	St. Louis Cardinals	4

== Managerial changes ==
=== Off-season ===
Team	Former Manager	New Manager
Cleveland Indians	Roger Peckinpaugh	Lou Boudreau
New York Giants	Bill Terry	Mel Ott
Philadelphia Phils	Doc Prothro	Hans Lobert

== League leaders ==
=== American League ===
Hitting leaders
Stat	Player	Total
AVG	Ted Williams^{1} (BOS)	.356
OPS	Ted Williams (BOS)	1.147
HR	Ted Williams^{1} (BOS)	36
RBI	Ted Williams^{1} (BOS)	137
R	Ted Williams (BOS)	141
H	Johnny Pesky (BOS)	205
SB	George Case (WSH)	44

^{1} American League Triple Crown batting winner

Pitching leaders
Stat	Player	Total
W	Tex Hughson (BOS)	22
L	Eddie Smith (CWS)	20
ERA	Ted Lyons (CWS)	2.10
K	Tex Hughson (BOS); Bobo Newsom (WSH)	113
IP	Tex Hughson (BOS)	281.0
SV	Johnny Murphy (NYY)	11
WHIP	Tiny Bonham (NYY)	0.987

=== National League ===
Hitting leaders
Stat	Player	Total
AVG	Ernie Lombardi (BSN)	.330
OPS	Mel Ott (NYG)	.912
HR	Mel Ott (NYG)	30
RBI	Johnny Mize (NYG)	110
R	Mel Ott (NYG)	118
H	Enos Slaughter (STL)	188
SB	Pete Reiser (BRO)	20

Pitching leaders
Stat	Player	Total
W	Mort Cooper (STL)	22
L	Jim Tobin (BSN)	21
ERA	Mort Cooper (STL)	1.78
K	Johnny Vander Meer (CIN)	186
IP	Jim Tobin (BSN)	287.2
SV	Hugh Casey (BRO)	13
WHIP	Mort Cooper (STL)	0.987

== Milestones ==
=== Batters ===
- Paul Waner (BSN):
  - Became the seventh member of the 3,000-hit club with a single in the fifth inning against the Pittsburgh Pirates on June 19.

== Awards and honors ==
=== Regular season ===
Baseball Writers' Association of America Awards
BBWAA Award	National League	American League
Most Valuable Player	Mort Cooper (STL)	Joe Gordon (NYY)

=== Other awards ===
The Sporting News Awards
Award	National League	American League
Most Valuable Player	Mort Cooper (STL)	Joe Gordon (NYY)
Player of the Year	—	Ted Williams (BOS)
Manager of the Year	Billy Southworth (STL)	—
Executive of the Year	Branch Rickey (STL)	—

=== Baseball Hall of Fame ===
- Rogers Hornsby

== Home field attendance ==
Team name	Wins	%±	Home attendance	%±	Per game
Brooklyn Dodgers	104	4.0%	1,037,765	−14.6%	13,136
New York Yankees	103	2.0%	922,011	−4.4%	11,974
New York Giants	85	14.9%	779,621	2.2%	9,869
Boston Red Sox	93	10.7%	730,340	1.6%	9,485
Chicago Cubs	68	−2.9%	590,972	8.4%	7,577
Detroit Tigers	73	−2.7%	580,087	−15.3%	7,534
St. Louis Cardinals	106	9.3%	553,552	−12.6%	7,097
Cleveland Indians	75	0.0%	459,447	−38.4%	5,743
Pittsburgh Pirates	66	−18.5%	448,897	−6.9%	5,830
Cincinnati Reds	76	−13.6%	427,031	−33.6%	5,546
Chicago White Sox	66	−14.3%	425,734	−37.1%	6,082
Philadelphia Athletics	55	−14.1%	423,487	−19.9%	5,572
Washington Senators	62	−11.4%	403,493	−2.9%	5,240
Boston Braves	59	−4.8%	285,332	8.2%	4,019
St. Louis Browns	82	17.1%	255,617	45.0%	3,320
Philadelphia Phils	42	−2.3%	230,183	−0.5%	3,111

== Venues ==
Over 80 home games, the Cleveland Indians played 46 games at Cleveland Stadium and 34 games at League Park. All Thursday home games took place at League Park. This would be the 8th of 12 seasons since 1932 that saw the Indians play at both venues.

Following the reversion of the Boston Bees name to Boston Braves the previous season, National League Park's name was also reverted, to Braves Field.

== Retired numbers ==
The Cincinnati Reds re-entered Willard Hershberger's No. 5 into circulation, only two years after his number was retired. This was the first number to be de-retired by any team in MLB. His number would later be re-retired to honor Johnny Bench in 1984.

== See also ==
- 1942 in baseball (Events, Movies, Births, Deaths)
