= List of Major League Baseball players (O) =

The following is a list of Major League Baseball players, retired or active. As of the end of the 2011 season, there have been 320 players with a last name that begins with O who have been on a major league roster at some point.

== O ==
Name	Debut	Final game	Position	Teams	Ref
Mike O'Berry	April 8, 1979	October 4, 1985	Catcher	Boston Red Sox, Chicago Cubs, Cincinnati Reds, California Angels, New York Yankees, Montreal Expos	
Billy O'Brien	September 27, 1884	October 3, 1890	First baseman	St. Paul Saints, Kansas City Cowboys (UA), Washington Nationals (1886–1889), Brooklyn Gladiators	
Bob O'Brien	April 11, 1971	July 7, 1971	Pitcher	Los Angeles Dodgers	
Buck O'Brien	September 9, 1911	August 6, 1913	Pitcher	Boston Red Sox, Chicago White Sox	
Charlie O'Brien	June 2, 1985	June 21, 2000	Catcher	Oakland Athletics, Milwaukee Brewers, New York Mets, Atlanta Braves, Toronto Blue Jays, Chicago White Sox, Anaheim Angels, Montreal Expos	
Cinders O'Brien	June 23, 1888	October 2, 1891	Pitcher	Cleveland Blues, Cleveland Spiders, Cleveland Infants, Boston Reds (AA)	
Dan O'Brien	September 4, 1978	September 28, 1979	Pitcher	St. Louis Cardinals	
Darby O'Brien	April 16, 1887	October 15, 1892	Outfielder	New York Metropolitans, Brooklyn Bridegrooms/Grooms	
Dink O'Brien	April 26, 1923	September 15, 1923	Catcher	Philadelphia Phillies	
Eddie O'Brien	April 25, 1953	April 19, 1958	Shortstop	Pittsburgh Pirates	
George O'Brien	August 16, 1915	August 23, 1915	Catcher	St. Louis Browns	
Jack O'Brien (C)	May 2, 1882	September 16, 1890	Catcher	Philadelphia Athletics (AA), Brooklyn Grays, Baltimore Orioles (AA)	
Jack O'Brien (OF)	April 14, 1899	September 28, 1903	Outfielder	Washington Senators (NL), Cleveland Blues (AL), Boston Americans	
John O'Brien (OF)	April 19, 1884	May 31, 1884	Outfielder	Baltimore Monumentals	
John O'Brien (2B)	April 22, 1891	October 7, 1899	Second baseman	Brooklyn Grooms, Chicago Colts, Louisville Colonels, Washington Senators (NL), Baltimore Orioles (NL), Pittsburgh Pirates	
Johnny O'Brien	April 19, 1953	July 19, 1959	Second baseman	Pittsburgh Pirates, St. Louis Cardinals, Milwaukee Braves	
Pete O'Brien (1890s 2B)	August 2, 1887	June 16, 1890	Second baseman	Washington Nationals (1886–1889), Chicago Colts	
Pete O'Brien (1900s 2B)	September 21, 1901	October 2, 1907	Second baseman	Cincinnati Reds, St. Louis Browns, Cleveland Naps, Washington Senators	
Pete O'Brien (1B)	September 3, 1982	July 20, 1995	First baseman	Texas Rangers, Cleveland Indians, Seattle Mariners	
Ray O'Brien	June 27, 1916	July 12, 1916	Outfielder	Pittsburgh Pirates	
Syd O'Brien	April 15, 1969	October 1, 1972	Third baseman	Boston Red Sox, Chicago White Sox, California Angels, Milwaukee Brewers	
Tom O'Brien (2B)	June 14, 1882	July 28, 1890	Second baseman	Worcester Ruby Legs, Baltimore Orioles (AA), Boston Reds (UA), New York Metropolitans, Rochester Broncos	
Tom O'Brien (OF)	May 10, 1897	October 13, 1900	Outfielder	Baltimore Orioles (NL), Pittsburgh Pirates, New York Giants	
Tommy O'Brien	April 24, 1943	May 13, 1950	Outfielder	Pittsburgh Pirates, Boston Red Sox, Washington Senators	
Danny O'Connell	July 14, 1950	September 26, 1962	Second baseman	Pittsburgh Pirates, Milwaukee Braves, New York/San Francisco Giants, Washington Senators (1961–1971)	
Jimmy O'Connell	April 17, 1923	September 28, 1924	Outfielder	New York Giants	
John O'Connell (2B)	August 22, 1891	September 20, 1902	Second baseman	Baltimore Orioles (AA), Detroit Tigers	
John O'Connell (C)	August 16, 1928	October 6, 1929	Catcher	Pittsburgh Pirates	
Pat O'Connell	July 22, 1886	September 9, 1886	Outfielder	Baltimore Orioles (AA)	
Andy O'Connor	October 6, 1908	October 6, 1908	Pitcher	New York Highlanders	
Brian O'Connor	May 13, 2000	September 27, 2000	Pitcher	Pittsburgh Pirates	
Dan O'Connor	June 3, 1890	July 19, 1890	First baseman	Louisville Colonels	
Frank O'Connor	August 3, 1893	August 7, 1893	Pitcher	Philadelphia Phillies	
Jack O'Connor (C)	April 20, 1887	October 9, 1910	Catcher	Cincinnati Red Stockings (AA), Columbus Solons, Cleveland Spiders, St. Louis Perfectos/Cardinals, Pittsburgh Pirates, New York Highlanders, St. Louis Browns	
Jack O'Connor (P)	April 9, 1981	October 3, 1987	Pitcher	Minnesota Twins, Montreal Expos, Baltimore Orioles	
Johnny O'Connor	September 16, 1916	September 16, 1916	Catcher	Chicago Cubs	
Michael O'Connor	April 27, 2006		Pitcher	Washington Nationals, New York Mets	
Paddy O'Connor	April 17, 1908	July 22, 1918	Catcher	Pittsburgh Pirates, St. Louis Cardinals, Pittsburgh Rebels, New York Yankees	
Darren O'Day	March 31, 2008		Pitcher	Los Angeles Angels of Anaheim, New York Mets, Texas Rangers	
Hank O'Day	May 2, 1884	October 3, 1890	Pitcher	Toledo Blue Stockings, Pittsburgh Alleghenys, Washington Nationals (1886–1889), New York Giants, New York Giants (PL)	
Ken O'Dea	April 21, 1935	August 6, 1946	Catcher	Chicago Cubs, New York Giants, St. Louis Cardinals, Boston Braves	
Paul O'Dea	April 19, 1944	September 20, 1945	Outfielder	Cleveland Indians	
Billy O'Dell	June 20, 1954	September 12, 1967	Pitcher	Baltimore Orioles, San Francisco Giants, Milwaukee/Atlanta Braves, Pittsburgh Pirates	
George O'Donnell	April 18, 1954	July 25, 1954	Pitcher	Pittsburgh Pirates	
Harry O'Donnell	April 30, 1927	September 30, 1927	Catcher	Philadelphia Phillies	
John O'Donnell	July 16, 1884	July 16, 1884	Catcher	Philadelphia Keystones	
John O'Donoghue (1960s P)	September 29, 1963	June 22, 1971	Pitcher	Kansas City Athletics, Cleveland Indians, Baltimore Orioles, Seattle Pilots, Milwaukee Brewers, Montreal Expos	
John O'Donoghue (1990s P)	June 27, 1993	October 3, 1993	Pitcher	Baltimore Orioles	
Lefty O'Doul	April 29, 1919	September 30, 1934	Outfielder	New York Yankees, Boston Red Sox, New York Giants, Philadelphia Phillies, Brooklyn Robins/Dodgers	
Bob O'Farrell	September 5, 1915	September 23, 1935	Catcher	Chicago Cubs, San Francisco Giants, St. Louis Cardinals, Cincinnati Reds	
Eric O'Flaherty	August 16, 2006		Pitcher	Seattle Mariners, Atlanta Braves	
Hal O'Hagan	September 24, 1892	July 17, 1902	First baseman	Washington Senators (NL), Chicago Orphans, New York Giants, Cleveland Bronchos	
Greg O'Halloran	May 16, 1994	August 6, 1994	Catcher	Florida Marlins	
Bill O'Hara	April 15, 1909	May 8, 1910	Outfielder	New York Giants, St. Louis Cardinals	
Kid O'Hara	September 15, 1904	September 22, 1904	Outfielder	Boston Beaneaters	
Tom O'Hara	September 19, 1906	July 4, 1907	Outfielder	St. Louis Cardinals	
Charley O'Leary	April 14, 1904	September 30, 1934	Shortstop	Detroit Tigers, St. Louis Cardinals, St. Louis Browns	
Dan O'Leary	September 3, 1879	August 6, 1884	Outfielder	Providence Grays, Boston Red Caps, Detroit Wolverines, Worcester Ruby Legs, Cincinnati Outlaw Reds	
Troy O'Leary	May 9, 1993	September 28, 2003	Outfielder	Milwaukee Brewers, Boston Red Sox, Montreal Expos, Chicago Cubs	
Ryan O'Malley	August 16, 2006	August 22, 2006	Pitcher	Chicago Cubs	
Tom O'Malley	May 8, 1982	October 3, 1990	Third baseman	San Francisco Giants, Chicago White Sox, Baltimore Orioles, Texas Rangers, Montreal Expos, New York Mets	
Ollie O'Mara	September 8, 1912	April 19, 1919	Shortstop	Detroit Tigers, Brooklyn Robins	
Tom O'Meara	September 29, 1895	July 22, 1896	Catcher	Cleveland Spiders	
Randy O'Neal	September 12, 1984	October 2, 1990	Pitcher	Detroit Tigers, Atlanta Braves, St. Louis Cardinals, Philadelphia Phillies, San Francisco Giants	
Skinny O'Neal	April 18, 1925	May 27, 1927	Pitcher	Philadelphia Phillies	
Denny O'Neil	June 18, 1893	July 26, 1893	First baseman	St. Louis Browns (NL)	
Ed O'Neil	June 20, 1890	October 12, 1890	Pitcher	Toledo Maumees, Philadelphia Athletics (AA)	
Fancy O'Neil	October 23, 1874	October 23, 1874	Right fielder	Hartford Dark Blues	
Hugh O'Neil	August 20, 1875	October 9, 1875	Utility player	Brooklyn Atlantics	
John O'Neil	April 16, 1946	September 29, 1946	Shortstop	Philadelphia Phillies	
Mickey O'Neil	September 12, 1919	June 19, 1927	Catcher	Boston Braves, Brooklyn Robins, Washington Senators, New York Giants	
Bill O'Neill	May 7, 1904	October 7, 1906	Outfielder	Boston Americans, Washington Senators, Chicago White Sox	
Emmett O'Neill	August 3, 1943	June 5, 1946	Pitcher	Boston Red Sox, Chicago Cubs, Chicago White Sox	
Fred O'Neill	May 3, 1887	May 22, 1887	Outfielder	New York Metropolitans	
Harry O'Neill (P)	September 15, 1922	May 28, 1923	Pitcher	Philadelphia Athletics	
Harry O'Neill (C)	July 23, 1939	July 23, 1939	Catcher	Philadelphia Athletics	
Jack O'Neill	April 21, 1902	October 3, 1906	Catcher	St. Louis Cardinals, Chicago Cubs, Boston Beaneaters	
Jim O'Neill	April 15, 1920	July 29, 1923	Shortstop	Washington Senators	
John O'Neill	September 6, 1899	September 5, 1902	Catcher	New York Giants	
Mike O'Neill	September 20, 1901	October 6, 1907	Pitcher	St. Louis Cardinals	
Paul O'Neill	September 3, 1985	October 7, 2001	Outfielder	Cincinnati Reds, New York Yankees	
Peaches O'Neill	April 16, 1904	August 4, 1904	Catcher	Cincinnati Reds	
Steve O'Neill	September 18, 1911	September 14, 1928	Catcher	Cleveland Naps/Indians, Boston Red Sox, New York Yankees, St. Louis Browns	
Tip O'Neill	May 5, 1883	August 30, 1892	Outfielder	New York Gothams, St. Louis Browns, Chicago Pirates, Cincinnati Reds	
Don O'Riley	June 20, 1969	August 1, 1970	Pitcher	Kansas City Royals	
O'Rourke, first name unknown	July 9, 1872	July 9, 1872	Pitcher	Eckford of Brooklyn	
Charlie O'Rourke	June 16, 1959	June 16, 1959	Pinch hitter	St. Louis Cardinals	
Frank O'Rourke	June 12, 1912	July 28, 1931	Third baseman	Boston Braves, Brooklyn Robins, Washington Senators, Boston Red Sox, Detroit Tigers, St. Louis Browns	
Jim O'Rourke β	April 26, 1872	September 22, 1904	Outfielder	Middletown Mansfields, Boston Red Stockings/Red Caps, Providence Grays, Buffalo Bisons (NL), New York Giants, New York Giants (PL), Washington Senators (NL)	
Jimmy O'Rourke	August 15, 1908	October 8, 1908	Utility player	New York Highlanders	
Joe O'Rourke	April 19, 1929	June 5, 1929	Pinch hitter	Philadelphia Phillies	
John O'Rourke	May 1, 1879	September 10, 1883	Outfielder	Boston Red Caps, New York Metropolitans	
Mike O'Rourke	September 1, 1890	October 15, 1890	Pitcher	Baltimore Orioles (AA)	
Patsy O'Rourke	April 16, 1908	July 12, 1908	Shortstop	St. Louis Cardinals	
Tim O'Rourke	May 27, 1890	August 7, 1894	Utility player	Syracuse Stars (AA), Columbus Solons, Baltimore Orioles (NL), Louisville Colonels, St. Louis Browns (NL), Washington Senators (NL)	
Tom O'Rourke	May 11, 1887	August 1, 1890	Catcher	Boston Beaneaters, New York Giants, Syracuse Stars (AA)	
Sean O'Sullivan	June 16, 2009		Pitcher	Los Angeles Angels of Anaheim, Kansas City Royals	
Dennis O'Toole	September 8, 1969	June 23, 1973	Pitcher	Chicago White Sox	
Jim O'Toole	September 26, 1958	July 22, 1967	Pitcher	Cincinnati Redlegs/Reds, Chicago White Sox	
Marty O'Toole	September 21, 1908	October 6, 1914	Pitcher	Cincinnati Reds, Pittsburgh Pirates, New York Giants	
Rebel Oakes	April 14, 1909	October 3, 1915	Outfielder	Cincinnati Reds, St. Louis Cardinals, Pittsburgh Rebels	
Prince Oana	April 22, 1934	September 18, 1945	Pitcher	Philadelphia Phillies, Detroit Tigers	
Johnny Oates	September 17, 1970	May 24, 1981	Catcher	Baltimore Orioles, Atlanta Braves, Philadelphia Phillies, Los Angeles Dodgers, New York Yankees	
Sherman Obando	April 10, 1993	July 21, 1997	Outfielder	Baltimore Orioles, Montreal Expos	
Henry Oberbeck	May 7, 1883	October 18, 1884	Outfielder	Pittsburgh Alleghenys, St. Louis Browns (AA), Baltimore Monumentals, Kansas City Cowboys (UA)	
Ken Oberkfell	August 22, 1977	October 4, 1992	Third baseman	St. Louis Cardinals, Atlanta Braves, Pittsburgh Pirates, San Francisco Giants, Houston Astros, California Angels	
Doc Oberlander	May 16, 1888	June 2, 1888	Pitcher	Cleveland Blues (AA)	
Frank Oberlin	September 20, 1906	June 28, 1910	Pitcher	Boston Red Sox, Washington Senators	
Wes Obermueller	September 20, 2002	July 13, 2007	Pitcher	Kansas City Royals, Milwaukee Brewers, Florida Marlins	
Jim Obradovich	September 12, 1978	September 29, 1978	First baseman	Houston Astros	
Alex Ochoa	September 18, 1995	September 29, 2002	Outfielder	New York Mets, Minnesota Twins, Milwaukee Brewers, Cincinnati Reds, Colorado Rockies, Anaheim Angels	
Iván Ochoa	July 12, 2008		Shortstop	San Francisco Giants	
Whitey Ock	September 29, 1935	September 29, 1935	Catcher	Brooklyn Dodgers	
Walter Ockey	May 3, 1944	May 20, 1944	Pitcher	New York Giants	
Ted Odenwald	April 13, 1921	April 21, 1922	Pitcher	Cleveland Indians	
Blue Moon Odom	September 5, 1964	August 17, 1976	Pitcher	Kansas City/Oakland Athletics, Cleveland Indians, Atlanta Braves, Chicago White Sox	
Dave Odom	May 31, 1943	September 13, 1943	Pitcher	Boston Braves	
Heinie Odom	April 22, 1925	April 22, 1925	Third baseman	New York Yankees	
Fred Odwell	April 16, 1904	September 12, 1907	Outfielder	Cincinnati Reds	
Bryan Oelkers	April 9, 1983	October 3, 1986	Pitcher	Minnesota Twins, Cleveland Indians	
Trent Oeltjen	August 6, 2009		Outfielder	Arizona Diamondbacks, Los Angeles Dodgers	
Chuck Oertel	September 1, 1958	September 26, 1958	Outfielder	Baltimore Orioles	
Joe Oeschger	April 21, 1914	September 6, 1925	Pitcher	Philadelphia Phillies, New York Giants, Boston Braves, Philadelphia Phillies, Brooklyn Robins	
Ron Oester	September 10, 1978	October 3, 1990	Second baseman	Cincinnati Reds	
José Offerman	August 19, 1990	October 2, 2005	Utility infielder	Los Angeles Dodgers, Kansas City Royals, Boston Red Sox, Seattle Mariners, Minnesota Twins, Philadelphia Phillies, New York Mets	
Rowland Office	August 5, 1972	April 20, 1983	Outfielder	Atlanta Braves, Montreal Expos, New York Yankees	
Alexi Ogando	June 15, 2010		Pitcher	Texas Rangers	
Curly Ogden	July 18, 1922	July 21, 1926	Pitcher	Philadelphia Athletics, Washington Senators	
Jack Ogden	June 22, 1918	September 9, 1932	Pitcher	New York Giants, St. Louis Browns, Cincinnati Reds	
Chad Ogea	May 3, 1994	October 2, 1999	Pitcher	Cleveland Indians, Philadelphia Phillies	
Jim Oglesby	April 14, 1936	April 17, 1936	First baseman	Philadelphia Athletics	
Ben Oglivie	September 4, 1971	October 5, 1986	Outfielder	Boston Red Sox, Detroit Tigers, Milwaukee Brewers	
Bruce Ogrodowski	April 14, 1936	October 3, 1937	Catcher	St. Louis Cardinals	
Joe Ogrodowski	April 27, 1925	April 27, 1925	Pitcher	Boston Braves	
Tomo Ohka	July 19, 1999		Pitcher	Boston Red Sox, Montreal Expos, Washington Nationals, Milwaukee Brewers, Toronto Blue Jays, Cleveland Indians	
Joe Ohl	July 29, 1909	August 5, 1909	Pitcher	Washington Senators	
Ross Ohlendorf	September 11, 2007		Pitcher	New York Yankees, Pittsburgh Pirates	
Will Ohman	September 19, 2000		Pitcher	Chicago Cubs, Atlanta Braves, Los Angeles Dodgers, Baltimore Orioles, Florida Marlins, Chicago White Sox	
Kevin Ohme	April 14, 2003	April 15, 2003	Pitcher	St. Louis Cardinals	
Kirt Ojala	August 18, 1997	May 4, 1999	Pitcher	Florida Marlins	
Augie Ojeda	June 4, 2000		Utility infielder	Chicago Cubs, Minnesota Twins, Arizona Diamondbacks	
Bob Ojeda	July 13, 1980	April 22, 1994	Pitcher	Boston Red Sox, New York Mets, Los Angeles Dodgers, Cleveland Indians, New York Yankees	
Miguel Ojeda	May 17, 2003	October 1, 2006	Catcher	San Diego Padres, Seattle Mariners, Colorado Rockies, Texas Rangers	
Hideki Okajima	April 2, 2007		Pitcher	Boston Red Sox	
Frank Okrie	April 20, 1920	August 4, 1920	Pitcher	Detroit Tigers	
Len Okrie	June 16, 1948	April 16, 1952	Catcher	Washington Senators, Boston Red Sox	
Jim Olander	September 20, 1991	October 5, 1991	Outfielder	Milwaukee Brewers	
Patrick O'Loughlin	May 9, 1883	May 9, 1883	Outfielder	Baltimore Orioles (AA)	
Dave Oldfield	June 28, 1883	October 11, 1886	Catcher	Baltimore Orioles (AA), Brooklyn Grays, Washington Nationals (1886–1889)	
John Oldham	September 2, 1956	September 2, 1956	Pinch runner	Cincinnati Redlegs	
Red Oldham	August 19, 1914	July 8, 1926	Pitcher	Detroit Tigers, Pittsburgh Pirates	
Bob Oldis	April 28, 1953	September 29, 1963	Catcher	Washington Senators, Pittsburgh Pirates, Philadelphia Phillies	
Rube Oldring	October 2, 1905	August 30, 1918	Outfielder	New York Highlanders/Yankees, Philadelphia Athletics	
John Olerud	September 3, 1989	October 2, 2005	First baseman	Toronto Blue Jays, New York Mets, Seattle Mariners, New York Yankees, Boston Red Sox	
Frank Olin	July 4, 1884	June 10, 1885	Outfielder	Washington Nationals (AA), Washington Nationals (UA), Toledo Blue Stockings, Detroit Wolverines	
Steve Olin	July 29, 1989	October 4, 1992	Pitcher	Cleveland Indians	
José Oliva	July 1, 1994	October 1, 1995	Third baseman	Atlanta Braves, St. Louis Cardinals	
Tony Oliva	September 9, 1962	September 29, 1976	Outfielder	Minnesota Twins	
Ed Olivares	September 16, 1960	September 26, 1961	Outfielder	St. Louis Cardinals	
Omar Olivares	August 18, 1990	September 28, 2001	Pitcher	St. Louis Cardinals, Colorado Rockies, Philadelphia Phillies, Detroit Tigers, Seattle Mariners, Anaheim Angels, Oakland Athletics, Pirates	
Al Oliver	September 23, 1968	October 5, 1985	Outfielder	Pittsburgh Pirates, Texas Rangers, Montreal Expos, San Francisco Giants, Philadelphia Phillies, Los Angeles Dodgers, Toronto Blue Jays	
Andrew Oliver	June 25, 2010		Pitcher	Detroit Tigers	
Bob Oliver	September 10, 1965	July 3, 1975	First baseman	Pittsburgh Pirates, Kansas City Royals, California Angels, Baltimore Orioles, New York Yankees	
Darren Oliver	September 1, 1993		Pitcher	Texas Rangers, St. Louis Cardinals, Boston Red Sox, Colorado Rockies, Florida Marlins, Houston Astros, New York Mets, Los Angeles Angels of Anaheim	
Dave Oliver	September 25, 1977	October 2, 1977	Second baseman	Cleveland Indians	
Gene Oliver	June 6, 1959	August 24, 1969	Utility player	St. Louis Cardinals, Milwaukee/Atlanta Braves, Philadelphia Phillies, Boston Red Sox, Chicago Cubs	
Joe Oliver	July 15, 1989	October 6, 2001	Catcher	Cincinnati Reds, Milwaukee Brewers, Detroit Tigers, Seattle Mariners, New York Yankees, Boston Red Sox	
Nate Oliver	April 9, 1963	September 27, 1969	Second baseman	Los Angeles Dodgers, San Francisco Giants, New York Yankees, Chicago Cubs	
Tom Oliver	April 14, 1930	September 23, 1933	Outfielder	Boston Red Sox	
Francisco Oliveras	May 3, 1989	October 3, 1992	Pitcher	Minnesota Twins, San Francisco Giants	
Lester Oliveros	July 1, 2011		Pitcher	Detroit Tigers, Minnesota Twins	
Chi-Chi Olivo	June 5, 1961	October 1, 1966	Pitcher	Milwaukee/Atlanta Braves	
Diomedes Olivo	September 5, 1960	June 12, 1963	Pitcher	Pittsburgh Pirates, St. Louis Cardinals	
Miguel Olivo	September 15, 2002		Catcher	Chicago White Sox, Seattle Mariners, San Diego Padres, Florida Marlins, Kansas City Royals, Colorado Rockies, Seattle Mariners	
Jim Ollom	September 3, 1966	September 15, 1967	Pitcher	Minnesota Twins	
Ray Olmedo	May 25, 2003		Shortstop	Cincinnati Reds, Toronto Blue Jays	
Luis Olmo	July 23, 1943	June 6, 1951	Outfielder	Brooklyn Dodgers, Boston Braves	
Fred Olmstead	July 2, 1908	September 4, 1911	Pitcher	Chicago White Sox	
Al Olmsted	September 12, 1980	October 3, 1980	Pitcher	St. Louis Cardinals	
Hank Olmsted	July 15, 1905	July 26, 1905	Pitcher	Boston Americans	
Barney Olsen	April 17, 1941	September 28, 1941	Outfielder	Chicago Cubs	
Kevin Olsen	September 7, 2001	September 27, 2003	Pitcher	Florida Marlins	
Ole Olsen	April 12, 1922	September 24, 1923	Pitcher	Detroit Tigers	
Scott Olsen	June 25, 2005		Pitcher	Florida Marlins, Washington Nationals	
Vern Olsen	September 8, 1939	September 13, 1946	Pitcher	Chicago Cubs	
Garrett Olson	July 4, 2007		Pitcher	Baltimore Orioles, Seattle Mariners, Pittsburgh Pirates	
Greg Olson	June 27, 1989	September 30, 1993	Catcher	Minnesota Twins, Atlanta Braves	
Gregg Olson	September 2, 1988	June 22, 2001	Pitcher	Baltimore Orioles, Atlanta Braves, Cleveland Indians, Kansas City Royals, Detroit Tigers, Houston Astros, Minnesota Twins, Arizona Diamondbacks, Los Angeles Dodgers	
Ivy Olson	April 12, 1911	July 21, 1924	Shortstop	Cleveland Naps, Cincinnati Reds, Brooklyn Robins	
Karl Olson	June 30, 1951	June 10, 1957	Outfielder	Boston Red Sox, Washington Senators, Detroit Tigers	
Marv Olson	September 13, 1931	April 30, 1933	Second baseman	Boston Red Sox	
Ted Olson	June 21, 1936	September 13, 1938	Pitcher	Boston Red Sox	
Tim Olson	May 30, 2004	June 19, 2005	Utility infielder	Arizona Diamondbacks, Colorado Rockies	
Ed Olwine	June 2, 1986	October 2, 1988	Pitcher	Atlanta Braves	
Logan Ondrusek	April 5, 2010		Pitcher	Cincinnati Reds	
Ralph Onis	April 27, 1935	April 27, 1935	Catcher	Brooklyn Dodgers	
Eddie Onslow	August 7, 1912	September 14, 1927	First baseman	Detroit Tigers, Cleveland Indians, Washington Senators	
Jack Onslow	May 2, 1912	October 3, 1917	Catcher	Detroit Tigers, New York Giants	
Steve Ontiveros (IF)	August 5, 1973	June 21, 1980	Third baseman	San Francisco Giants, Chicago Cubs	
Steve Ontiveros (P)	June 14, 1985	October 1, 2000	Pitcher	Oakland Athletics, Philadelphia Phillies, Seattle Mariners, Boston Red Sox	
José Oquendo	May 2, 1983	September 29, 1995	Second baseman	New York Mets, St. Louis Cardinals	
Mike Oquist	August 14, 1993	September 21, 1999	Pitcher	Baltimore Orioles, San Diego Padres, Oakland Athletics	
Tom Oran	May 4, 1875	July 4, 1875	Outfielder	St. Louis Red Stockings	
Ernie Oravetz	April 11, 1955	September 30, 1956	Outfielder	Washington Senators	
Luis Ordaz	September 3, 1997	April 3, 2006	Shortstop	St. Louis Cardinals, Kansas City Royals, Tampa Bay Devil Rays	
Tony Ordeñana	October 3, 1943	October 3, 1943	Shortstop	Pittsburgh Pirates	
Magglio Ordóñez	August 29, 1997		Outfielder	Chicago White Sox, Detroit Tigers	
Rey Ordóñez	April 1, 1996	July 17, 2004	Shortstop	New York Mets, Tampa Bay Devil Rays, Chicago Cubs	
Joe Orengo	April 18, 1939	September 25, 1945	Utility infielder	St. Louis Cardinals, New York Giants, Brooklyn Dodgers, Detroit Tigers, Chicago White Sox	
Kevin Orie	April 1, 1997	September 26, 2002	Third baseman	Chicago Cubs, Florida Marlins	
George Orme	September 14, 1920	September 17, 1920	Outfielder	Boston Red Sox	
Jess Orndorff	April 18, 1907	April 24, 1907	Catcher	Boston Doves	
Eddie Oropesa	April 2, 2001	May 20, 2004	Pitcher	Philadelphia Phillies, Arizona Diamondbacks, San Diego Padres	
Jesse Orosco	April 5, 1979	September 27, 2003	Pitcher	New York Mets, Los Angeles Dodgers, Cleveland Indians, Milwaukee Brewers, Baltimore Orioles, St. Louis Cardinals, San Diego Padres, New York Yankees, Minnesota Twins	
Billy Orr	May 3, 1913	May 22, 1914	Shortstop	Philadelphia Athletics	
Dave Orr	May 17, 1883	October 2, 1890	First baseman	New York Metropolitans, New York Gothams, Brooklyn Bridegrooms, Columbus Solons, Brooklyn Ward's Wonders	
Pete Orr	April 5, 2005		Utility infielder	Atlanta Braves, Washington Nationals, Philadelphia Phillies	
Joe Orrell	August 12, 1943	August 6, 1945	Pitcher	Detroit Tigers	
Ernie Orsatti	September 4, 1927	September 28, 1935	Outfielder	St. Louis Cardinals	
John Orsino	July 14, 1961	September 10, 1967	Catcher	San Francisco Giants, Baltimore Orioles, Washington Senators (1961–1971)	
Joe Orsulak	September 1, 1983	September 25, 1997	Outfielder	Pittsburgh Pirates, Baltimore Orioles, New York Mets, Florida Marlins, Montreal Expos	
Jorge Orta	April 15, 1972	June 10, 1987	Second baseman	Chicago White Sox, Cleveland Indians, Los Angeles Dodgers, Toronto Blue Jays, Kansas City Royals	
Anthony Ortega	April 25, 2009		Pitcher	Los Angeles Angels of Anaheim	
Bill Ortega	September 7, 2001	September 28, 2001	Pinch hitter	St. Louis Cardinals	
Phil Ortega	September 10, 1960	May 4, 1969	Pitcher	Los Angeles Dodgers, Washington Senators (1961–1971), California Angels	
Frank Ortenzio	September 9, 1973	September 30, 1973	First baseman	Kansas City Royals	
Al Orth	August 15, 1895	September 20, 1909	Pitcher	Philadelphia Phillies, Washington Senators, New York Highlanders	
Baby Ortiz	September 23, 1944	September 27, 1944	Pitcher	Washington Senators	
David Ortiz	September 2, 1997		Designated hitter	Minnesota Twins, Boston Red Sox	
Héctor Ortiz	September 14, 1998	May 15, 2002	Catcher	Kansas City Royals, Texas Rangers	
Javier Ortiz	June 15, 1990	October 6, 1991	Outfielder	Houston Astros	
José Ortiz (OF)	September 4, 1969	June 16, 1971	Outfielder	Chicago White Sox, Chicago Cubs	
José Ortiz (2B)	September 15, 2000	September 27, 2002	Second baseman	Oakland Athletics, Colorado Rockies	
Junior Ortiz	September 20, 1982	August 8, 1994	Catcher	Pittsburgh Pirates, New York Mets, Minnesota Twins, Cleveland Indians, Texas Rangers	
Luis Ortiz	August 31, 1993	September 28, 1996	Third baseman	Boston Red Sox, Texas Rangers	
Ramón Ortiz	August 19, 1999		Pitcher	Anaheim Angels, Cincinnati Reds, Washington Nationals, Minnesota Twins, Colorado Rockies, Los Angeles Dodgers, Chicago Cubs	
Roberto Ortiz	September 6, 1941	September 2, 1950	Outfielder	Washington Senators, Philadelphia Athletics	
Russ Ortiz	April 2, 1998		Pitcher	San Francisco Giants, Atlanta Braves, Arizona Diamondbacks, Baltimore Orioles, Houston Astros, Los Angeles Dodgers	
Daniel Ortmeier	September 5, 2005		Outfielder	San Francisco Giants	
John Orton	August 20, 1989	July 4, 1993	Catcher	California Angels	
Chad Orvella	May 31, 2005		Pitcher	Tampa Bay Devil Rays	
Ossie Orwoll	April 13, 1928	August 21, 1929	Utility player	Philadelphia Athletics	
Bob Osborn	September 16, 1925	September 24, 1931	Pitcher	Chicago Cubs, Pittsburgh Pirates	
Fred Osborn	June 8, 1907	July 24, 1909	Outfielder	Philadelphia Phillies	
Ozzie Osborn	April 26, 1975	September 23, 1975	Pitcher	Chicago White Sox	
Bobo Osborne	June 27, 1957	September 24, 1963	First baseman	Detroit Tigers, Washington Senators (1961–1971)	
Donovan Osborne	April 9, 1992	May 15, 2004	Pitcher	St. Louis Cardinals, Chicago Cubs, New York Yankees	
Fred Osborne	July 14, 1890	September 1, 1890	Outfielder	Pittsburgh Alleghenys	
Tiny Osborne	April 15, 1922	September 28, 1925	Pitcher	Chicago Cubs, Brooklyn Robins	
Wayne Osborne	April 18, 1935	May 6, 1936	Pitcher	Pittsburgh Pirates, Boston Bees	
Pat Osburn	April 13, 1974	September 22, 1975	Pitcher	Cincinnati Reds, Milwaukee Brewers	
Charlie Osgood	June 18, 1944	June 18, 1944	Pitcher	Brooklyn Dodgers	
Keith Osik	April 5, 1996	October 1, 2005	Catcher	Pittsburgh Pirates, Milwaukee Brewers, Baltimore Orioles, Washington Nationals	
Dan Osinski	April 11, 1962	April 16, 1970	Pitcher	Los Angeles Angels, Milwaukee Braves, Boston Red Sox, Chicago White Sox, Houston Astros	
Franquelis Osoria	June 7, 2005	July 30, 2008	Pitcher	Los Angeles Dodgers, Pittsburgh Pirates	
Harry Ostdiek	September 10, 1904	October 7, 1908	Catcher	Cleveland Naps, Boston Red Sox	
Champ Osteen	September 18, 1903	May 3, 1909	Shortstop	Washington Senators, New York Yankees, St. Louis Cardinals	
Claude Osteen	July 6, 1957	September 27, 1975	Pitcher	Cincinnati Redlegs/Reds, Washington Senators (1961–1971), Los Angeles Dodgers, Houston Astros, St. Louis Cardinals, Chicago White Sox	
Darrell Osteen	September 2, 1965	July 19, 1970	Pitcher	Cincinnati Reds, Oakland Athletics	
Fred Ostendorf	July 16, 1914	July 16, 1914	Pitcher	Indianapolis Hoosiers (FL)	
Bill Oster	August 23, 1954	September 20, 1954	Pitcher	Philadelphia Athletics	
Red Ostergard	June 14, 1921	August 17, 1921	Pinch hitter	Chicago White Sox	
Charlie Osterhout	June 23, 1879	September 6, 1879	Catcher/Outfielder	Syracuse Stars (NL)	
Fritz Ostermueller	April 21, 1934	September 30, 1948	Pitcher	Boston Red Sox, St. Louis Browns, Brooklyn Dodgers, Pittsburgh Pirates	
Jimmy Osting	May 2, 2001	August 27, 2002	Pitcher	San Diego Padres, Milwaukee Brewers	
Brian Ostrosser	August 5, 1973	August 13, 1973	Shortstop	New York Mets	
Joe Ostrowski	July 18, 1948	August 20, 1952	Pitcher	St. Louis Browns, New York Yankees	
Johnny Ostrowski	September 24, 1943	October 1, 1950	Outfielder	Chicago Cubs, Boston Red Sox, Chicago White Sox, Washington Senators	
Al Osuna	September 2, 1990	September 27, 1996	Pitcher	Houston Astros, Los Angeles Dodgers, San Diego Padres	
Antonio Osuna	April 25, 1995	April 10, 2005	Pitcher	Los Angeles Dodgers, Chicago White Sox, New York Yankees, San Diego Padres, Washington Nationals	
Roy Oswalt	May 6, 2001		Pitcher	Houston Astros, Philadelphia Phillies	
Willis Otáñez	August 25, 1998	October 3, 1999	Third baseman	Baltimore Orioles, Toronto Blue Jays	
Reggie Otero	September 2, 1945	September 29, 1945	First baseman	Chicago Cubs	
Ricky Otero	April 26, 1995	August 17, 1997	Outfielder	New York Mets, Philadelphia Phillies	
Bill Otey	September 27, 1907	June 24, 1911	Pitcher	Pittsburgh Pirates, Washington Senators	
Amos Otis	September 6, 1967	August 5, 1984	Outfielder	New York Mets, Kansas City Royals, Pittsburgh Pirates	
Bill Otis	July 4, 1912	July 6, 1912	Outfielder	New York Highlanders	
Harry Otis	September 5, 1909	September 29, 1909	Pitcher	Cleveland Naps	
Akinori Otsuka	April 6, 2004	July 1, 2007	Pitcher	San Diego Padres, Texas Rangers	
Billy Ott	September 4, 1962	July 14, 1964	Outfielder	Chicago Cubs	
Ed Ott	June 10, 1974	October 2, 1981	Catcher	Pittsburgh Pirates, California Angels	
Mel Ott β	April 27, 1926	July 11, 1947	Outfielder	New York Giants	
Adam Ottavino	May 29, 2010		Pitcher	St. Louis Cardinals	
Jim Otten	July 31, 1974	September 30, 1981	Pitcher	Chicago White Sox, St. Louis Cardinals	
John Otten	July 5, 1895	September 28, 1895	Catcher	St. Louis Browns (NL)	
Billy Otterson	September 4, 1887	October 10, 1887	Shortstop	Brooklyn Grays	
Dave Otto	September 8, 1987	August 10, 1994	Pitcher	Oakland Athletics, Cleveland Indians, Pittsburgh Pirates, Chicago Cubs	
Phil Ouellette	September 10, 1986	October 3, 1986	Catcher	San Francisco Giants	
Johnny Oulliber	July 25, 1933	October 1, 1933	Outfielder	Cleveland Indians	
Chink Outen	April 16, 1933	October 1, 1933	Catcher	Brooklyn Dodgers	
Jimmy Outlaw	April 20, 1937	May 8, 1949	Outfielder	Cincinnati Reds, Boston Bees, Detroit Tigers	
Josh Outman	September 2, 2008		Pitcher	Oakland Athletics	
Orval Overall	April 16, 1905	July 29, 1913	Pitcher	Cincinnati Reds, Chicago Cubs	
Lyle Overbay	September 19, 2001		First baseman	Arizona Diamondbacks, Milwaukee Brewers, Toronto Blue Jays, Pittsburgh Pirates	
Stubby Overmire	April 25, 1943	August 3, 1952	Pitcher	Detroit Tigers, St. Louis Browns, New York Yankees	
Mike Overy	August 14, 1976	September 9, 1976	Pitcher	California Angels	
Ernie Ovitz	June 22, 1911	June 22, 1911	Pitcher	Chicago Cubs	
Bob Owchinko	September 25, 1976	October 1, 1986	Pitcher	San Diego Padres, Cleveland Indians, Oakland Athletics, Pittsburgh Pirates, Cincinnati Reds, Montreal Expos	
Dave Owen	September 6, 1983	October 2, 1988	Shortstop	Chicago Cubs, Kansas City Royals	
Frank Owen	April 29, 1901	May 12, 1909	Pitcher	Detroit Tigers, Chicago White Sox	
Larry Owen	August 14, 1981	September 25, 1988	Catcher	Atlanta Braves, Kansas City Royals	
Marv Owen	April 16, 1931	August 2, 1940	Third baseman	Detroit Tigers, Chicago White Sox, Boston Red Sox	
Mickey Owen	May 2, 1937	September 11, 1954	Catcher	St. Louis Cardinals, Brooklyn Dodgers, Chicago Cubs, Boston Red Sox	
Spike Owen	June 25, 1983	October 2, 1995	Shortstop	Seattle Mariners, Boston Red Sox, Montreal Expos, New York Yankees, California Angels	
Eric Owens	June 6, 1995	September 27, 2003	Outfielder	Cincinnati Reds, Milwaukee Brewers, San Diego Padres, Florida Marlins, Anaheim Angels	
Henry Owens	July 7, 2006		Pitcher	New York Mets, Florida Marlins	
Jack Owens	September 21, 1935	September 22, 1935	Catcher	Philadelphia Athletics	
Jayhawk Owens	June 6, 1993	September 28, 1996	Catcher	Colorado Rockies	
Jerry Owens	September 11, 2006		Outfielder	Chicago White Sox	
Jim Owens	April 19, 1955	June 20, 1967	Pitcher	Philadelphia Phillies, Cincinnati Reds, Houston Colt .45s/Astros	
Red Owens	July 28, 1899	May 31, 1905	Second baseman	Philadelphia Phillies, Brooklyn Superbas	
Yip Owens	September 11, 1905	October 3, 1915	Catcher	Boston Americans, Chicago White Sox, Brooklyn Tip-Tops, Baltimore Terrapins	
Micah Owings	April 6, 2007		Pitcher	Arizona Diamondbacks, Cincinnati Reds	
Rick Ownbey	August 17, 1982	July 3, 1986	Pitcher	New York Mets, St. Louis Cardinals	
Henry Oxley	July 30, 1884	October 10, 1884	Catcher	New York Gothams, New York Metropolitans	
Chris Oxspring	September 2, 2005	September 17, 2005	Pitcher	San Diego Padres	
Andy Oyler	May 8, 1902	July 21, 1902	Third baseman	Baltimore Orioles (1901–02)	
Ray Oyler	April 18, 1965	October 1, 1970	Shortstop	Detroit Tigers, Seattle Pilots, California Angels	
Doc Ozmer	May 11, 1923	May 11, 1923	Pitcher	Philadelphia Athletics	
Pablo Ozuna	April 23, 2000		Utility player	Florida Marlins, Colorado Rockies, Chicago White Sox, Los Angeles Dodgers	
