= Maam =

Maam can refer to:

- ma'am, contraction for Madam
- Maam, also known as Maum, County Galway, Ireland
- Maam Valley, a glacial valley on the Maam Valley Fault, County Galway, Ireland
- Maam Cross, County Galway, Ireland
