= Cornamona =

Village in County Galway, Ireland

Corr na Móna
- Village
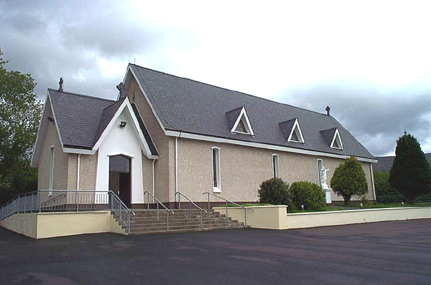
- Church of the Sacred Heart

- Location in Ireland
- Coordinates: 53°30′52″N 9°26′56″W
- Country: Ireland
- Province: Connacht
- County: County Galway
- Elevation: 85 m (279 ft)
- Corr na Móna is the only official name. The anglicized spelling Cornamona has no official status.

Corr na Móna (anglicized as Cornamona) is a village and townland in County Galway, Ireland. It is part of the Gaeltacht (Irish-speaking region) in Joyce Country.

The village lies on the north of Lough Corrib in the middle of the Joyce Country Mountain and Lake Districts. It is a popular site among trout and salmon anglers.

The eastern edge of the area comes down to the shores of the Corrib while the western edge borders the upland area of An Mám, the Maam Valley and the Maumturk Mountains.

The local secondary school is Coláiste Naomh Feichín, Corr na Móna. The village also has a shop, pub, playground, pier and community centre.

Corr na Móna was used as the filming location for Foscadh, an Irish language film released in 2021.

== Notable people ==
- Mick Molloy, former rugby union player and medical officer.
- Éamon Ó Cuív, Teachta Dála, lives in Cornamona.

== See also ==
- List of towns and villages in Ireland
