= Jack O'Neill (baseball) =

American baseball player (1873–1935)

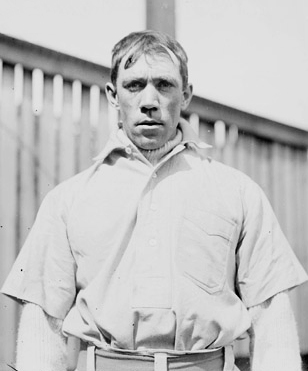
- Catcher
- Born: 10 January 1873; Maum, County Galway, Ireland
- Died: 29 June 1935 (aged 62); Scranton, Pennsylvania, U.S.
- Batted: Right Threw: Right

MLB debut
- April 21, 1902, for the St. Louis Cardinals

Last MLB appearance
- October 3, 1906, for the Boston Beaneaters

MLB statistics
- Batting average: .196
- Home runs: 1
- Runs batted in: 74
- Stats at Baseball Reference

Teams
- St. Louis Cardinals (1902–1903); Chicago Cubs (1904–1905); Boston Beaneaters (1906)

John Joseph O'Neill (10 January 1873 – 29 June 1935) was an American professional baseball catcher who played for the St. Louis Cardinals (1902–03), Chicago Cubs (1904–05) and Boston Beaneaters (1906). He batted and threw right-handed.

He was born in the townland of Tawnaleen, near Maum, in County Galway, Ireland, to Michael O'Neill, a small farmer in Maum, and Mary Joyce.

O'Neill was one of four major league brothers. Steve was a catcher and manager, Jim a shortstop, and Mike, who also was born in Ireland, was a pitcher and formed a brother battery with Jack for the St. Louis Cardinals.

O'Neill shared catching duties for the Cardinals, Cubs and Beaneaters in a modest span of five years. He was a smart runner with some speed and usually was used in pinch-running situations. His most productive season came in 1903, when he posted career-highs in batting average (.236), runs (23), hits (58), doubles (nine), runs batted in (21), stolen bases (11) and games played (75).

In 303 games O'Neill was a .196 hitter with 20 stolen bases and 74 RBI. He also collected 185 hits with 24 doubles, five triples, and one home run in 945 at-bats.

O'Neill died in Scranton, Pennsylvania, at the age of 62.

== See also ==
- List of players from Ireland in Major League Baseball
