= Doolin Cave =

Cave in County Clare, Ireland

Coordinates: 53°02′31″N 9°20′42″W

Doolin Cave / Pol an Ionain
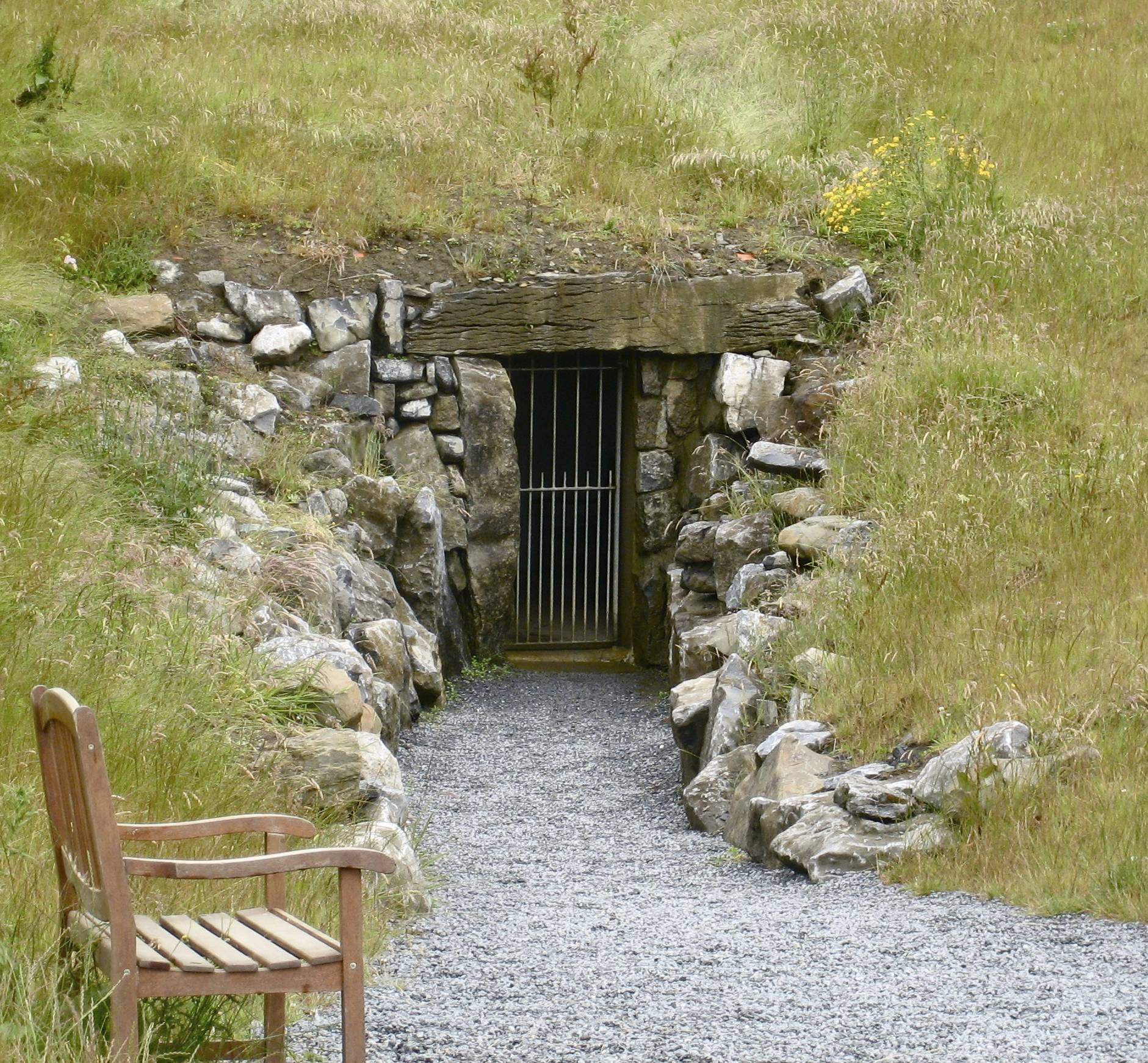
- Entrance to Pol an Ionain
- Location: Doolin, County Clare, Ireland
- Length: c. 600m
- Discovery: 1952
- Geology: Limestone
- Entrances: 1
- Access: Show cave
- Translation: Ivy Cliff Cave
- Pronunciation: Powl on Un-awn

Doolin Cave (Irish: Pol an Ionain or Poll-an-Ionain) is a limestone cave near Doolin in County Clare, Ireland, on the western edge of The Burren. The name is the anglicised version of the Irish name Poll an Eidhneáin, which is said to translate into "Ivy Cliff Cave". The cave attracted some controversy due to its development and marketing as a show cave in the early 21st century. It is now open to the public, branded as Doolin Cave.

== Great Stalactite ==
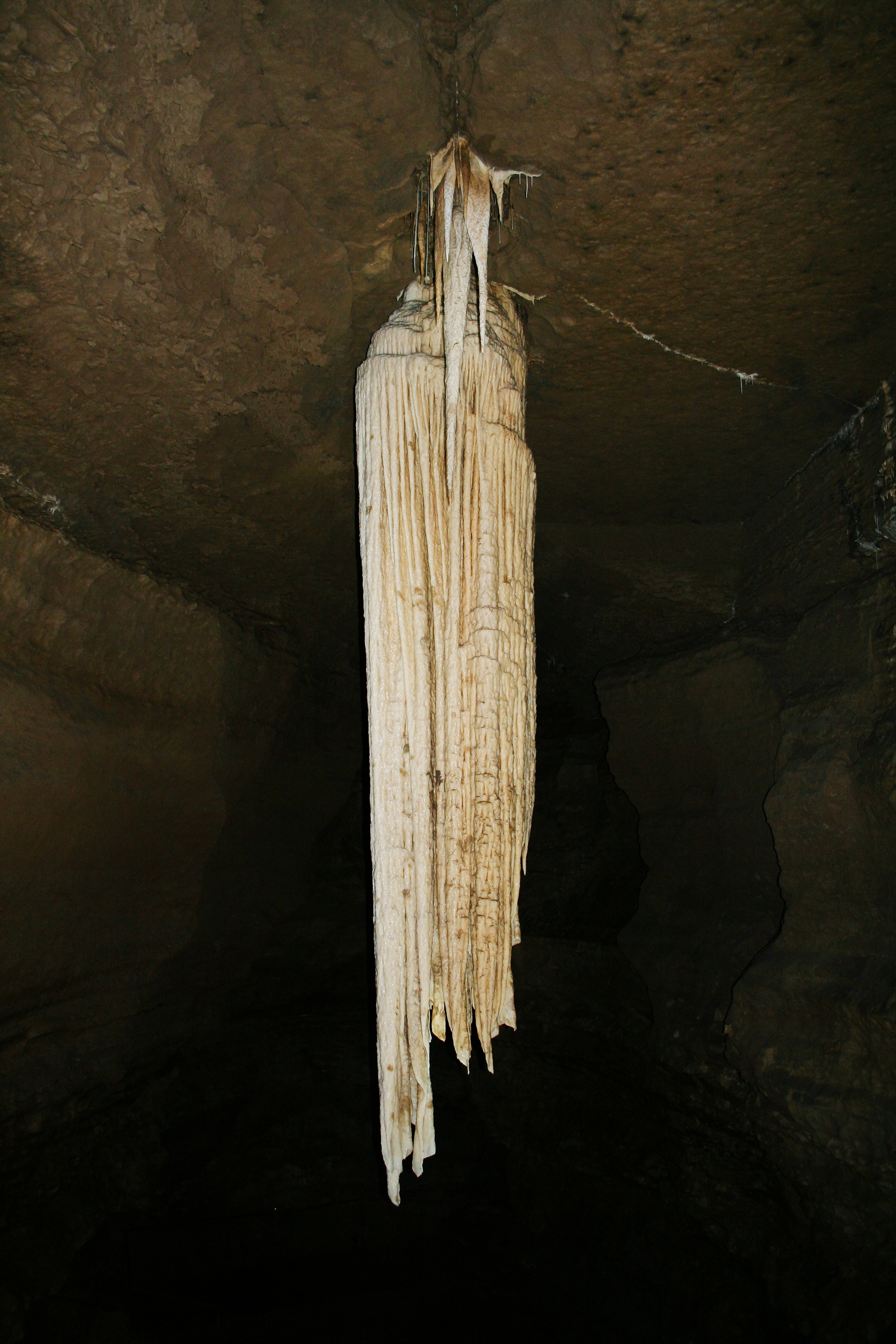
The Great Stalactite

The cave's most notable feature is the Great Stalactite. This is one of the world's longest known free-hanging stalactites, reported to be 7.3 m (24 ft) in length. This figure is a matter of some confusion, however, as it is also variously described as being 11 m, 6.2 m and 6.54 m. It is the longest known free-hanging stalactite in Europe, the three largest in the world being located in two caves in Mexico, and one in Jeita Grotto, Lebanon.

== History ==
The cave was discovered in 1952 by J. M. Dickenson and Brian M. Varley of the Craven Pothole Club, an English caving club based in the Yorkshire Dales. Entry was arduous, requiring a long, difficult crawl.

In 1990, the land on which the cave is located was purchased by John and Helen Browne. The couple undertook an effort to develop the cave as a show cave. This provoked a reaction from the Speleological Union of Ireland who feared the 30-metre (98 ft) shaft that would have to be blasted to access the cave would damage the stalactite. They also objected to the fact that the caving trip would be lost to cavers and that the cave was a short artificial trip with only one feature. After an extended period of court proceedings, financing and development, the cave was opened to the public as a show cave in 2006, subject to the conditions of not having a visitor centre on-site and restricting visitor numbers. No blasting was allowed to construct the entrance shaft. The developers instead used a system whereby a hole was drilled and an air expander placed in the hole to break the rock.

In 2010, a visitor centre and café opened on the site.

=== Criticism and recognition ===
The development of Pol an Ionain has been criticised for being environmentally damaging and for being devoid of any features besides the Great Stalactite. In spite of this, Doolin Cave has twice received Gold Standard from Ecotourism Ireland, in 2013 and 2015. Doolin Cave is also a member of the Burren Ecotourism Network (B.E.N.), which commits to the "promotion of responsible tourism that conserves the environment and improves the wellbeing of local people". Members of the Burren Ecotourism Network adhere to the Burren and Cliffs of Moher Geopark Code of Practice.
