= Mike O'Neill (baseball) =

Irish baseball player (1877–1959)

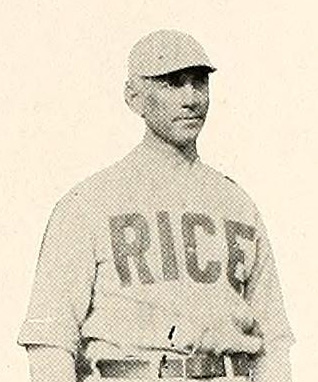
- O'Neill pictured in The Campanile 1925 (Rice University yearbook)
- Pitcher/Outfielder
- Born: October 5, 1877; Maum, County Galway, Ireland
- Died: August 12, 1959 (aged 81); Scranton, Pennsylvania, U.S.
- Batted: Right Threw: Right

MLB debut
- September 20, 1901, for the St. Louis Cardinals

Last MLB appearance
- October 6, 1907, for the Cincinnati Reds

MLB statistics
- Win–loss record: 32–44
- Earned run average: 2.73
- Strikeouts: 228
- Stats at Baseball Reference

Teams
- St. Louis Cardinals (1901–1904); Cincinnati Reds (1907)

Michael Joyce O'Neill (5 October 1877 – 12 August 1959) was an Irish born starting pitcher and left fielder in Major League Baseball. From 1901 through 1907, he played for the St. Louis Cardinals (1901–04) and Cincinnati Reds (1907). O'Neill batted and threw right-handed. A native of Maam, Ireland, he played as Michael Joyce in his 1901 rookie year with the Cardinals.

== Birth ==
He was born in the village of Maum, in County Galway, Ireland, to Michael O'Neill, a landholder, and Mary Joyce.

== Career ==
O'Neill was a good-hitting pitcher who occasionally played in the left field. In 1901, he ended with a 2–2 record and a 1.32 earned run average, including a shutout, and hit .400 (6-for-15). His most productive season came in 1902, when he posted an 18–12 record with two shutouts, a 2.75 ERA, and two saves. On June 3, he was rested until being summoned as a pinch hitter in the ninth inning with the bases loaded. O'Neill responded by hitting the first pinch grand slam in major league history off Togie Pittinger of the Boston Beaneaters. It was an inside-the-park home run as O'Neill became the first National League pitcher to hit a grand slam in the 20th century.

Despite his 3.26 ERA in 1903, O'Neill had a 4-13 record, in part due to poor run support, as he posted a WHIP of 1.56. He went 10-14 with a 2.09 ERA in 1904 and did not return with St. Louis the next year. He also played with the Cincinnati Reds in 1907, strictly as a reserve left fielder and pinch-hitter, retiring from baseball at the end of the season. In a four-season pitching career, O'Neill posted a 32–44 record with 228 strikeouts and a 2.73 ERA in 694.1 innings. He completed 68 games in 77 starts. In five seasons, he was a .255 hitter with two home runs and 41 RBI in 137 games played (85 as a pitcher).

O'Neill died in Scranton, Pennsylvania at the age of 81.

== MLB record ==
=== Pitching record ===
Note: G = Games pitched; IP = Innings pitched; W = Wins; L = Losses; ERA = Earned run average; SO = Strikeouts

Year/Team	G	IP	W	L	ERA	SO
1901 St. Louis Cardinals	5	41.0	2	2	1.32	16
1902 St. Louis Cardinals	36	288.1	16	15	2.90	105
1903 St. Louis Cardinals	19	145.0	4	13	3.79	39
1904 St. Louis Cardinals	25	220.0	10	14	2.09	68

==== Batting record ====
Note: G = Games played; AB = At bats; H = Hits; Avg. = Batting average; HR = Home runs; RBI = Runs batted in

Year/Team	G	AB	H	Avg.	HR	RBI
1901 St. Louis Cardinals	6	15	6	.400	0	1
1902 St. Louis Cardinals	51	135	43	.319	2	15
1903 St. Louis Cardinals	41	110	25	.227	0	6
1904 St. Louis Cardinals	30	91	21	.227	0	6
1907 Cincinnati Reds	9	29	2	.069	0	2

== Head coaching record ==
Statistics overview
Season	Team	Overall	Conference	Standing	Postseason
Rice Owls (Southwest Conference) (1924)
1924	Rice	4–12	3-11		
Rice:		4–12 (.250)	3–11 (.214)		
Total:		4–12 (.250)			
National champion Postseason invitational champion Conference regular season champion Conference regular season and conference tournament champion Division regular season champion Division regular season and conference tournament champion Conference tournament champion

== Family ==
O'Neill was one of four brothers who played in the major leagues:

- Jack (1873–1975), a catcher for the St. Louis Cardinals, Chicago Cubs and Boston Braves (1902–1906), who also caught Mike's first start for St. Louis (April 4, 1902)
- Steve (1891–1962), who caught for the Cleveland Indians, Boston Red Sox, New York Yankees and St. Louis Browns (1911–1928), and later managed the Cleveland Indians, Detroit Tigers, Boston Red Sox, and Philadelphia Phillies (1935–1954)
- Jim (1893–1976), a shortstop for the Washington Senators (1920, 1923)

== See also ==
- List of players from Ireland in Major League Baseball
