= Steve O'Neill =

American baseball player and manager (1891–1962)

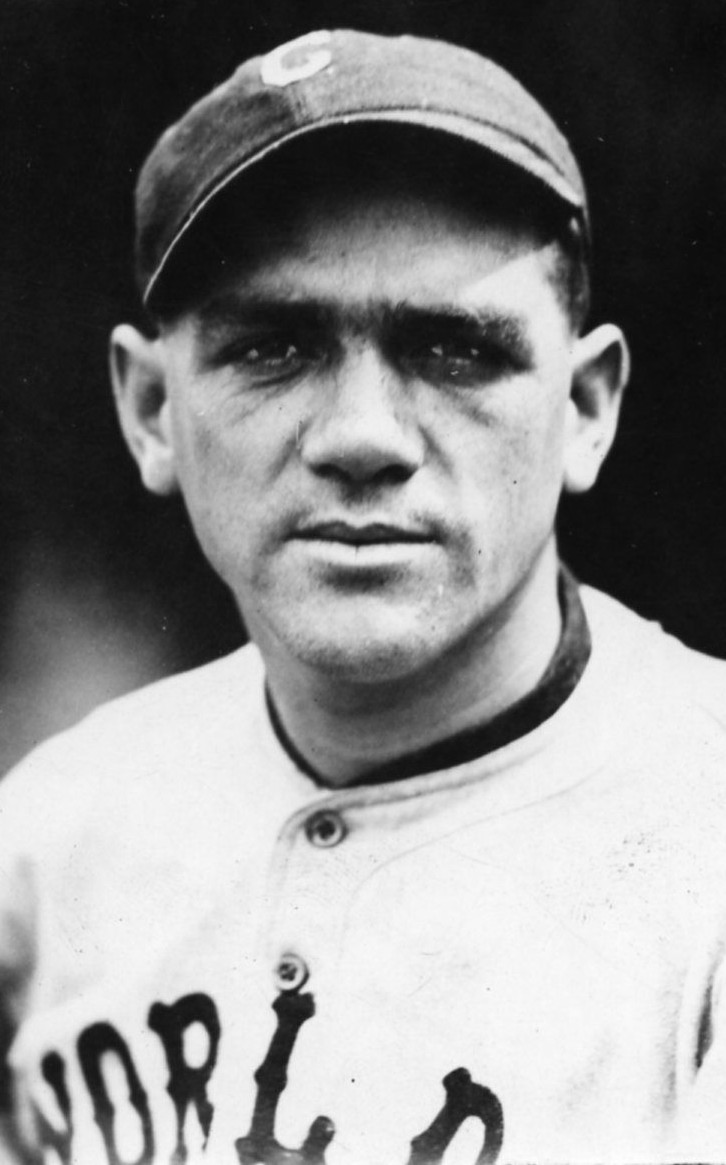
- Catcher / Manager
- Born: July 6, 1891; Minooka, Pennsylvania, U.S.
- Died: January 26, 1962 (aged 70); Cleveland, Ohio, U.S.
- Batted: Right Threw: Right

MLB debut
- September 18, 1911, for the Cleveland Naps

Last MLB appearance
- September 14, 1928, for the St. Louis Browns

MLB statistics
- Batting average: .263
- Home runs: 13
- Runs batted in: 534
- Managerial record: 1,040–821
- Winning %: .559
- Stats at Baseball Reference
- Managerial record at Baseball Reference

Teams
- As player: Cleveland Naps/Indians (1911–1923); Boston Red Sox (1924); New York Yankees (1925); St. Louis Browns (1927–1928); As manager: Cleveland Indians (1935–1937); Detroit Tigers (1943–1948); Boston Red Sox (1950–1951); Philadelphia Phillies (1952–1954)

Career highlights and awards
- 2× World Series champion (1920, 1945); Cleveland Guardians Hall of Fame

Stephen Francis O'Neill (July 6, 1891 – January 26, 1962) was an American professional baseball catcher and manager. He played his first 13 seasons with the Cleveland Indians. As a manager, he led the 1945 Detroit Tigers to a World Series championship.

== Early life ==
O'Neill was born in Minooka, Pennsylvania (now a part of Scranton), to Irish immigrants from Maum, County Galway, Michael "Squire" O'Neill and Mary (née Joyce) O'Neill. He was one of four brothers who escaped a life in the coal mines by playing in the major leagues. They were Jack, a catcher in the National League (1902–1906); Mike, a right-handed pitcher in the NL (1901–1904, 1907); and Jim, an infielder with the American League Washington Senators (1920, 1923). Baseball historian William C. Kashatus noted that Michael and Jack "would become the first brother battery in major league history". The O'Neill brothers "were known to exchange their signals in Gaelic in order to fool the opposing coaches".

Later, two of Steve O'Neill's daughters married professional baseball players, one of whom was Skeeter Webb, who played under O'Neill in the minor leagues in 1939 and again from 1945 to 1947, when O'Neill piloted the Tigers.

== Baseball career ==
O'Neill first played professional baseball in 1910 with the Elmira Colonels, managed by his brother Mike as a backup catcher. An injury opened the door to him getting playing time that saw him catch well enough to attract attention. He was signed by the Philadelphia Athletics, led by Connie Mack. He played for Worcester in the New England League for 1911 before he was sent to the Cleveland Naps on August 20 in a sale by Mack at the request of Harry Davis (a longtime player for Mack), who had signed on to serve as player-manager for the 1912 season.

Steve would end up having the most successful playing career of the O'Neill brothers, serving as a catcher for 17 years in the American League. He made his major league debut as a September call-up on the 18th in 1911 for the Naps against the Boston Red Sox. He went 1-for-4 while stealing a base. He would spend the next twelve years with the team. He appeared in eight other games, collecting four total hits. He gradually played more for Cleveland in the next three seasons, going from 69 to 80 to 87 games; in 1913, while batting .295 in eighty games, he received votes enough to finish 24th in MVP voting. He then played a majority of a season for the first time in 1915, playing in 121 games while batting .236 with 91 hits and 34 RBIs; he hit two home runs that season, the first of just thirteen in his career. Aside from 1917, when he batted .184, he would bat above .230 for the rest of his career. O'Neill collected his first hundred hit season in 1919, doing so by collecting 115 hits in 125 games while driving in 47 runs; he batted .289 while also collecting 35 doubles with 48 walks and 21 strikeouts. The following year, he had his finest and longest season. He played 149 games and batted .321 with 55 RBIs and career highs in hits (157), doubles (39), and home runs (three). His final home run of that season came in the moment of tragedy. On August 16, he hit a home run off Carl Mays of the New York Yankees. That same night, as he drove in another run to win the game for Cleveland 4–3, a Mays fastball hit Ray Chapman in the head that saw him die that night; O'Neill and the rest of the team saw his body before the funeral and he fainted after seeing him in the casket. That season saw Cleveland win the American League pennant for the first time ever. In the 1920 World Series, O'Neill batted .333 by going 7-for-21 while driving in two runs (both in Game 1, which Cleveland won 3–0) as they beat the Brooklyn Robins in seven games.

He was dealt by Cleveland in a seven-player deal that saw them trade Dan Boone, Joe Connolly, Bill Wambsganss, and O'Neill to the Boston Red Sox for George Burns, Chick Fewster and Roxy Walters for the 1924 season. He batted .238 in 106 games while having 73 hits with 38 RBIs. He was put on waivers and picked up by the New York Yankees on December 15, 1924. In 1925, he played in just 35 games and batted .286 with 26 hits and 10 RBIs before being released. He spent the next two years in the International League before returning to the majors to play with the St. Louis Browns in 1927, where he played 84 combined games in two seasons; his final highlight came in that season: On May 17, facing Howard Ehmke, he hit a shot to left field for his thirteenth and final home run of his career. During his last season in 1928, while riding a cab in New York City, he was hit by a truck that nearly killed him. His final game came on September 14. Facing the Chicago White Sox, he went 0-for-3. O'Neill compiled a batting average of .263 with 1,259 hits, thirteen home runs and 537 runs batted in (RBI) in 1,590 games.

== Managerial career ==
When his playing career ended, O'Neill turned to managing in the minors. He started by managing the Toronto Maple Leafs of the International League from 1929 to 1931, serving as player-manager. He then managed the Toledo Mud Hens from 1932 to 1934. He soon gained a reputation for cultivating talented young players, some of whom went on to become Hall of Famers. As a big league manager with four teams—the Indians (1935–1937), Tigers (1943–1948), Red Sox (1950–1951) and Philadelphia Phillies (1952–1954)—O'Neill never had a losing record. His Tigers won the 1945 World Series (when they defeated the Chicago Cubs in the Cubs' last Fall Classic appearance until 2016) and O'Neill was known for turning around under-performing teams, often in mid-season.

He was hired by Cleveland manager Walter Johnson in 1935 as a pitching coach due to his success with Toledo. However, O'Neill would become manager of the team after Johnson was fired when the team was 46–48. O'Neil led them to 36 wins in the remaining sixty games of the year to result in an 82–71 overall record (with three ties). The 1935 team finished third, but his next two teams finished fifth and fourth while racking up eighty wins before he was let go. He returned to minor league managing with the Buffalo Bisons in 1938, where he stayed until 1940 to serve as coach with the Detroit Tigers for a year. He then moved over to Detroit's minor league team in the Beaumont Exporters for the 1942 season. He was then hired for 1944 by the Tigers as manager to replace Del Baker. While the Tigers only saw a five-game improvement in wins with O'Neill's first team, it was their first winning season since 1940. The next year, they went 88–66 on the strength of Hal Newhouser, who won MVP as a pitcher. The Tigers led the American League as late as September 26 before playing their final series against the Washington Senators with the St. Louis Browns close. The Tigers, having to play four games in three days, would split the series while St. Louis edged them out on the final day of the season to win the pennant. The next year, the Tigers would be involved in another pennant race that saw them come out on top; they took the lead for the pennant on June 27 for good, finishing 1.5 games ahead of Washington to clinch the pennant while Newhouser won the pitching Triple Crown and another MVP. In the 1945 World Series, facing Charlie Grimm and the 98-win Chicago Cubs, the Tigers ended up losing two of the three games in Detroit before the series shifted to Chicago for Game 4. They won the next two games to take a 3–2 series lead before a twelve-inning thriller in Game 6 saw the series tied. In Game 7, the Tigers would rely on Newhouser (who started Game 1 and 5 with a win in the latter) to carry them through with run support as they won 9–3 to win their first world title since 1935. The 1946 team finished second with 92 wins as the Boston Red Sox trounced the League with over 100 wins, and the next year saw them win 85 games but still finish second. A fifth-place finish in 1948 saw him let go by the Tigers in favor of Red Rolfe.

O'Neill served as a scout for the 1949 Red Sox before being hired to take over as Boston's third-base coach upon the sudden death of incumbent Kiki Cuyler. However, he was asked midway through the season to take over for Joe McCarthy as manager after general manager Joe Cronin asked him to resign; at the time the team was 31–28, but O'Neill led them to 63 wins in 95 games for an overall finish of 94–60. The Red Sox became the first post-World War II team to score over 1,000 runs in a season while also becoming the last (as of 2026) to record a batting average over .300. As late as September 18, they were just a game behind for the league pennant, but a late-season slump saw them lose seven of their last twelve games, which included three double-headers (with two wins out of six). The 1951 season proved to be an indicator of diminishing returns, as it would be the first of sixteen straight seasons where Boston did not win ninety games. They finished with a record of 87–67 for third place, eleven games behind the Yankees once again; O'Neill was replaced by Lou Boudreau. At the time that O'Neill had been let go from the Red Sox, he had won 150 games and lost 99, and combined with his 199–168 record with Cleveland and 509–414 mark with Detroit, he had a managerial record of 858–681.

He took over for the Philadelphia Phillies midway through the 1952 season. Eddie Sawyer had led the 1950 team (dubbed the "Whiz Kids" by the press) to the National League pennant, owing to the generally youthful status of the players (such as future Hall of Famer Richie Ashburn). However, they had dovetailed from first to fifth the previous year, and a 28–35 record on June 27 meant that Sawyer was let go for O'Neill. He proceeded to win 59 out of the next 91 games, gradually moving them to a fourth-place finish. He won 83 games the next season (with two ties), which ended with his 1,000th win at the end of the season while finishing in a tie for third place with the St. Louis Cardinals (22 games back of the pennant winners). However, he did not finish the next season. With a record of 40–37, he was fired on July 15 for Terry Moore (Moore would win just 35 games the rest of the way).

== Legacy ==
His career winning percentage over fourteen seasons was a stalwart .559 (1,040 victories with 821 losses and eighteen ties). O'Neill is one of 23 managers with a winning percentage of .540 while also winning 1,000 games and he is also one of twelve managers to win 1,000 games without having also lost 1,000 games. Legendary players who benefited from O'Neill's guidance included Lou Boudreau, Bob Feller, Hal Newhouser, and Robin Roberts. O'Neill was inducted into the International League Hall of Fame. He was also an inaugural member of the Cleveland Indians Hall of Fame.

== Personal life ==
O'Neill died at age 70 in Cleveland, Ohio, after suffering a heart attack, and is interred in St. Joseph's Cemetery, Minooka.

== Managerial record ==
Team	Year	Regular season					Postseason			
Team	Year	Games	Won	Lost	Win %	Finish	Won	Lost	Win %	Result
CLE	1935	59	36	23	.610	3rd in AL	–	–	–	–
CLE	1936	154	80	74	.519	5th in AL	–	–	–	–
CLE	1937	154	83	71	.539	4th in AL	–	–	–	–
CLE total		367	199	168	.542		0	0	–	
DET	1943	154	78	76	.506	5th in AL	–	–	–	–
DET	1944	154	88	66	.571	2nd in AL	–	–	–	–
DET	1945	153	88	65	.575	1st in AL	4	3	.571	Won World Series (CHC)
DET	1946	154	92	62	.597	2nd in AL	–	–	–	–
DET	1947	154	85	69	.552	2nd in AL	–	–	–	–
DET	1948	154	78	76	.506	5th in AL	–	–	–	–
DET total		923	509	414	.551		4	3	.571	
BOS	1950	95	63	32	.663	3rd in AL	–	–	–	–
BOS	1951	154	87	67	.565	3rd in AL	–	–	–	–
BOS total		249	150	99	.602		0	0	–	
PHI	1952	91	59	32	.648	4th in NL	–	–	–	–
PHI	1953	154	83	71	.539	4th in NL	–	–	–	–
PHI	1954	77	40	37	.519	fired	–	–	–	–
PHI total		322	182	140	.565		0	0	–	
Total		1861	1040	821	.559		4	3	.571	

== See also ==
- List of Major League Baseball managerial wins and winning percentage leaders

== Sources ==
- Baseball Almanac

Sporting positions
Preceded by Kiki Cuyler	Boston Red Sox third-base coach 1950	Succeeded by Eddie Mayo
