= Maam Valley =

Glacial valley in Connemara, County Galway, Ireland

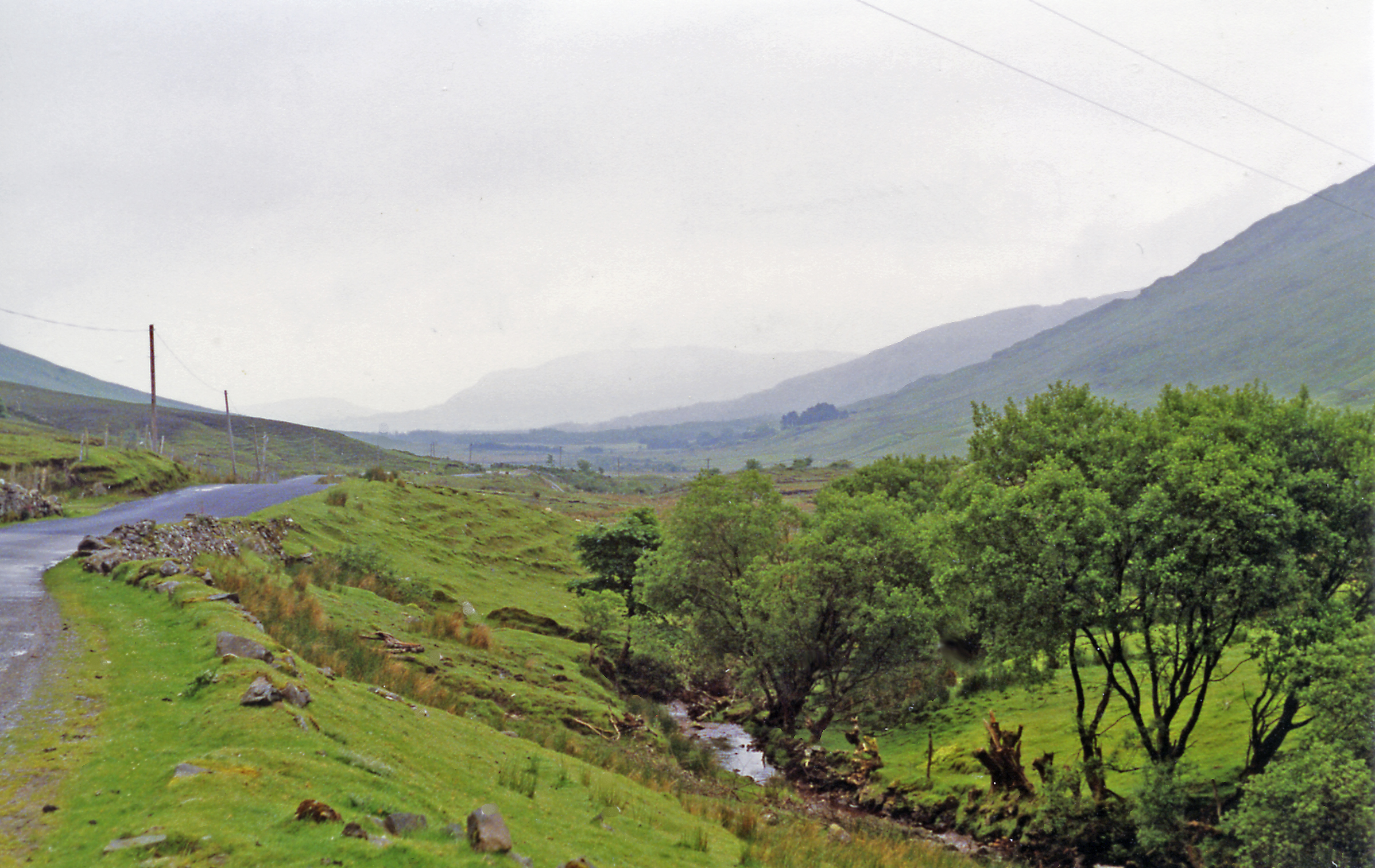
Maam Valley, with Maumturk mountains on the right

Gleann an Mháma (English: Maam Valley) is a glacial valley in County Galway, Ireland. It lies within Joyce Country in Connemara and is part of an aspirant geopark. Much of the valley is in the Connemara Gaeltacht.

== Location and topography ==
The valley runs north-northwest from An Mám (also known, unofficially, in English, as Maum or Maam) and the north-western end of Lough Corrib to just south of Leenaun (also known in English as Leenane) on Killary Harbour.

Starting near its northern end, the valley holds the main course of the Joyce River, coming down from the western flanks to pick up small tributaries. In turn this river is subsumed into the Bealnabrack River, also coming from the valley's western side, near An Mám, and then the combined river absorbs the Failmore River and some small streams before merging into Lough Corrib.

The valley passes through part of the Maamturk or Maum Turk Mountains. There is a pass, the Mamean or Mameen Pass, crossing part of the mountains to another major valley, the Inagh Valley.

== Access ==
The valley is bisected by the R336 road, which splits off from the N59 at Maam Cross and rejoins it at Leenaun.

== Population centres ==
At the southern end is the small settlement of An Mám, and at the northern end, though some argue strictly speaking outside the valley, is Leenaun. An Mám has an active pub, and Leenaun has a pub, hotel and guest house, café and restaurants, outdoor leisure centre and community centre, and more again at the nearby Delphi Resort and Delphi Lodge across the fjord. There are small pockets of population in the valley.

Nearby are Cornamona and Clonbur.

== Popular culture ==
The Maam Valley features in famous film The Quiet Man, with the Quiet Man Cottage located near An Mám.

== Science ==
The valley, formed around a fault, and modified by heavy glaciation, is considered of geological interest. In January 2018 a fossil found in the valley in the 1990s was declared to be a distinct species and named for its finder Dr Eamon N. Doyle. This find attracted international attention, and a well-known Irish nature writer, Michael Viney, suggested that it advanced the case for a Maam Valley and Joyce Country Geopark, on the lines of the successful Burren and Cliffs of Moher Geopark.

== Religion ==
There was an old pilgrimage site in the Mamean Pass above the valley.

== Bibliography ==
- Glasgow, Scotland, UK: University of Glasgow, Dept. of Geology and Applied Geology; Graham, John R., Leake, Bernard E., Ryan, P. D.: The Geology of South Mayo, Western Ireland
