= Eamon N. Doyle =

Geologist and science promoter, finder of Crepidosoma doyleii, and painter

Eamon Doyle is an Irish scientist, science promoter, and painter, based in County Clare, where he is the official geologist for The Burren and the Cliffs of Moher, and the geopark encompassing them. In 2017, a new species of brittle star, that he discovered in fossil form from 435 million years ago, Crepidosoma doyleii, was named after him and he identified a further new species in 2019.

== Early life ==
Eamon Noel Doyle was born in Dublin in 1963, and moved with his family to County Clare when he was ten years old. He completed his second level education at the local Christian Brothers School.

== Career ==
=== Early career ===
Doyle pursued undergraduate and postgraduate qualifications in the areas of Marine / Ocean Science and Earth Studies at University College Galway (UCG), with a focus on geology. He conducted advanced research work in palaeontology between 1981 and 1988, studying parts of Clare and County Galway, receiving his PhD from UCG in 1989. In the early 1990s he took up a post as lecturer in geology at the University of the West Indies at Mona, a suburb of Kingston, Jamaica. Spending four years as a sedimentologist, he participated in exploratory and classification work.

=== Painting ===
Having spent some time in Mexico and Bolivia, and the United States, Doyle returned to Ireland, living for a time at Moycullen in Galway before moving to County Clare. He was active as a painter, primarily of natural scenes but also of portraits. He operated the West Clare Gallery and Studio beside the former railway station in Ennistymon, from 2003-2004 with Philip Morrison, then solo from 2005 to 2012, as well as producing a number of commissioned works.

=== Geopark and local government work ===
In 2012, Dr Doyle took up a contract post as geologist for the 2011-established UNESCO-recognised Burren and Cliffs of Moher Geopark, with a significant outreach and education mandate, and this contract was renewed up to 2016. Then in 2016, he was appointed as geologist for Clare County Council, with particular responsibility for the geopark. Doyle's work involves oversight of the geological sites of the greater Burren area, education programmes for school children and adults, including a summer Field Geology course and support for local participation in the Irish Young Scientist Exhibition, production of book and other printed material for the geopark, interaction with professional and partner bodies, and development of heritage and walking trails in the Burren. In 2017 he also worked on a study of the Lisdoonvara catchment area. He also continues to work occasionally with NUI Galway's Earth and Ocean Sciences division of the School of Natural Sciences and other elements of the university, co-hosting the post-conference field trip of the Neanderthal 150 Symposium of 2014, for example, in remembrance of geologist and palaeontologist William King.

== Discoveries ==
Doyle worked within teams which discovered and classified a range of finds in Jamaica, and was an author for several papers concerning the geology and paleontology of the west of Ireland. In 2014, he co-authored a study with Prof. M. Williams that concluded that Galway Bay was notably smaller in extent within perhaps the last 5000–7500 years, with forests, and accompanying fauna and population, where the sea now reaches. In 2015, he discovered a significant 320-million year old shark tooth.

In January 2018, he was recognised for his discovery, in the late 1980s in the Maam Valley area of County Galway, of a species of brittle star, now named Crepidosoma doyleii after him. Doyle identified a further new species in 2019, a crinoid columnal.

== Publications ==
Doyle has co-authored a range of academic papers, as well as illustrating the short book "Corrib Country Fossils" The papers include some on Jamaica, and some on parts of the West of Ireland, a couple of which were discussed in national news.

=== On Jamaica ===
- 1993: A New Smooth-Shelled Argyrotheca Dall (Brachiopoda, Articulata) from the Eocene of Jamaica (with S Donovan)
- 1994: Pleistocene echinoid (Echinodermata) fauna from southeast Jamaica (with Dixon, Donovan, Pickerill)
- 1994: Pleistocene Echinoid (Echinodermata) Fauna from Southeast Jamaica (with Dixon, Donovan, Pickerill)

=== On Ireland ===
- 1992: A Flexible Crinoid from the Llandovery (Silurian) of Western Ireland (with S Donovan)
- 1994: Storm‐dominated sedimentation along a rocky transgressive shoreline in the Silurian (Llandovery) of Western Ireland (sole author)
- 2003: A Silurian (Llandovery) Eoplectodonta Shell Bed in Western Ireland: the Role of Opportunism, Storms and Sedimentation Rates in its Formation (with D Harper)
- 2014: Dates from drowned mid-Holocene landscapes on the central western Irish seaboard (with D Williams)

== Personal life ==
Dr Doyle lives in Carrownaclough, between Ennistymon and Clouna in County Clare, on the edge of the Burren, and is married to Mariel Doyle.
