= Burren and Cliffs of Moher Geopark =

Area of geological interest including the Burren and Cliffs of Moher

Coordinates: 52.9721612°N 9.4285324°W

- Interactive map of Burren and Cliffs of Moher Geopark
- Location: Ireland
- Website: www.burrengeopark.ie

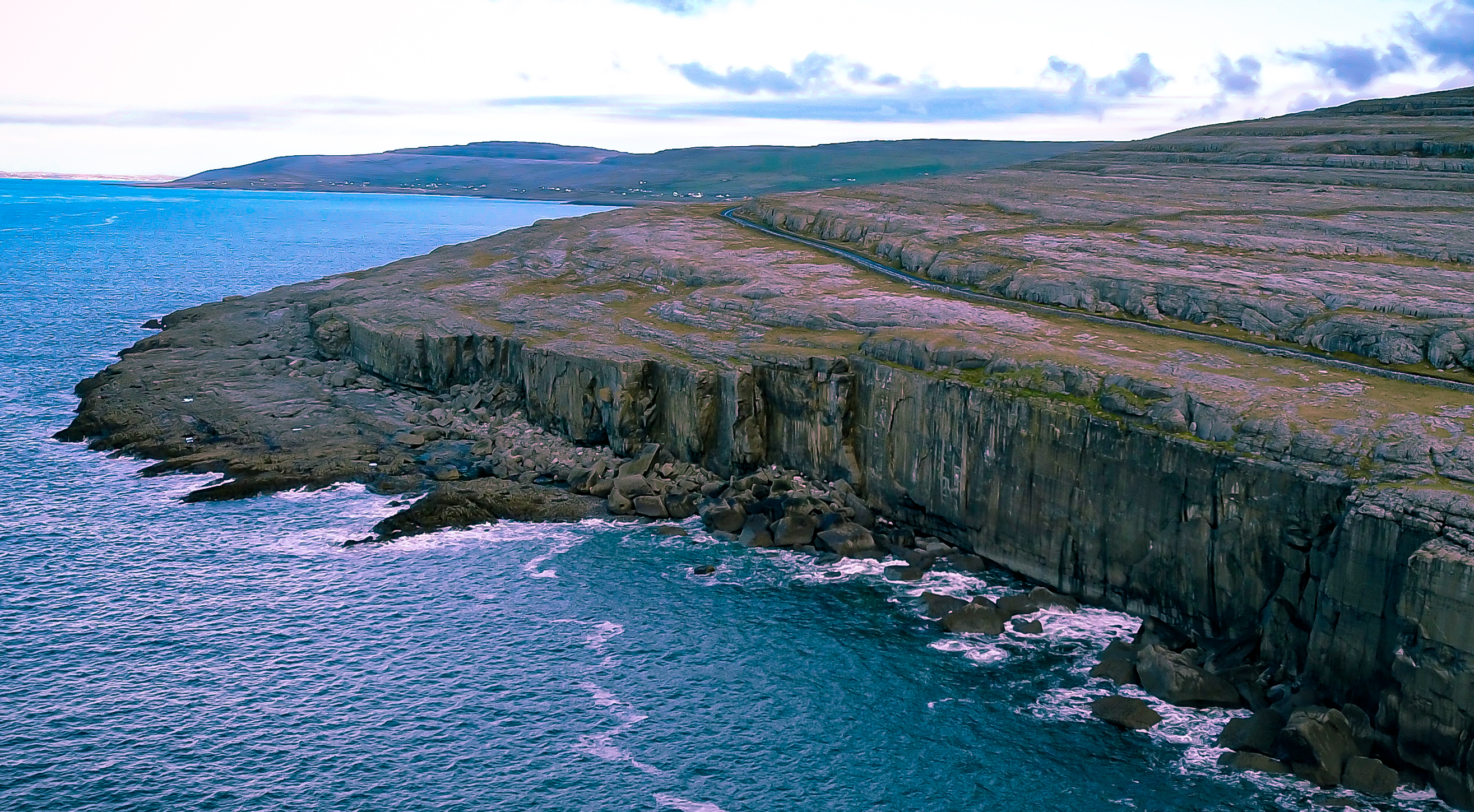
Alladie Cliffs, part of the Burren and Cliffs of Moher Geopark

The Burren and Cliffs of Moher Geopark (formally The Burren and Cliffs of Moher UNESCO Global Geopark) is an internationally designated area of geological interest in The Burren region of County Clare, Ireland. It is the third Geopark to be designated in Ireland, and is recognised at both European and global levels.

== History ==
The geopark began as a mid-2000s project of Clare County Council and the local community, the "Environmental Protection of the Burren through Visitor Management Initiative", which was funded and supported by the council, Fáilte Ireland, Shannon Development, the National Parks and Wildlife Service and the Burrenbeo Trust. The initiative evolved into BurrenConnect in 2006, with a dedicated project manager.

The geopark was formally established in 2011, under the management of the County Council, with special support and some funding from the Geological Survey of Ireland and Failte Ireland. It was launched on 3 March 2011 by Councillor Christy Curtin, then mayor of Clare and Darina Allen.

== Status and recognition ==
The geopark secured membership of both the European Geoparks Network and the UNESCO-assisted Global Network of National Geoparks in 2011. Global status must be renewed every four years and was successfully renewed in 2015. The geopark won the National Geographic World Legacy Award for Destination Leadership in 2016.

== Organisation ==
The geopark is hosted and managed by Clare County Council, and further supported by the Geological Survey of Ireland, with a range of other partners supporting the work in general, or in specific aspects, such as the Geopark LIFE program. Governance and oversight is provided by a Steering and Advisory Committee.

Strategic and day-to-day operations are led by a manager, Carol Gleeson, previously the project manager of BurrenConnect, and there is a lead geologist, Dr Eamon N. Doyle, successor to Drs Sarah Gatley and later Ronán Hennessy. Other functions include communications, tourism support, and outreach. Much of the work of the geopark is done with partners.

== Features ==
The Burren comprises dramatic glaciated karst landscapes on Ireland’s Atlantic coast which have been fashioned in a variety of limestones, sandstones and siltstones originating during the Carboniferous period. The nearby Cliffs of Moher are vertical sandstone and shale sea-cliffs, the highest in Europe, which rise to a height of over 200m in places and which have long drawn sightseers to the area.

Important local sights include the Aillwee Cave system and Doolin Cave with one of the world's largest stalactites. Population centres include Lisdoonvarna, Ballyvaughan, Kilfenora, Doolin, Lahinch, Ennistymon, Fanore and Kilshanny.

Major activity centres include the Burren Outdoor Education Centre, the Burren Centre and the Boghill Centre. The Burren Outdoor Education Centre is a particularly active partner of the geopark. Major accommodation providers are also engaged, with a network of local hospitality providers, hotels, bed-and-breakfast establishments and at least one retreat centre.

== The geosites ==
Over the life of the geopark to date, twenty focal "geosites" have been designated, with signage. These sites are chosen for accessibility and geological interest, along with possible architectural and / or heritage interest. They are specially monitored for littering, graffiti and damage.

== Events ==
Regular cycles of lectures are run, as well as the Burren Rocks festival. The geopark geologist, Dr Eamon N. Doyle, has worked with the Caherconnell Archaeological Field School to run a summer Field School of Geology.

== Twinning ==
The geopark is twinned since 2015 with the karst Stone Forest (Shilin) geopark of Yunnan province in southwestern China.
