= Jim O'Neill (baseball) =

American baseball player (1893–1976)

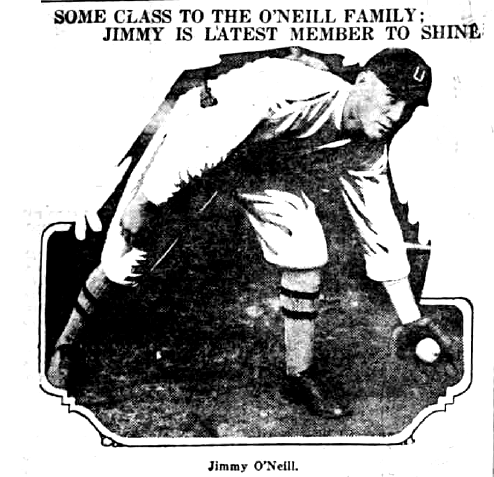

James Leo O'Neill (February 23, 1893 – September 5, 1976) was an American professional baseball player who played as a shortstop in Major League Baseball (MLB) between 1920 and 1923 for the Washington Senators. He batted and threw right-handed.

== Biography ==
Born on February 23, 1893, in Minooka, Pennsylvania, James Leo O'Neill was the youngest of four brothers who played in the major leagues. Steve, the most prominent of the four, was a catcher in the majors for seventeen years and also managed the Indians, Tigers, Red Sox and Phillies. Jack caught with the Cardinals, Cubs and Beaneaters, and Mike was a pitcher and left fielder for the Cardinals and Reds.

James L. O'Neill played for the Minooka Blues in the Northeast Pennsylvania Temperance League, as well as for multiple other minor league clubs from 1914 through 1930. He played with the Washington Senators in part of two seasons in 1920 and 1923, and posted a .287 batting average with one home run and 43 RBI in 109 games.

== Death ==
O'Neill died in Chambersburg, Pennsylvania, at the age of eighty-three.
