= Maum =

An Mám Maum
- Village and townland
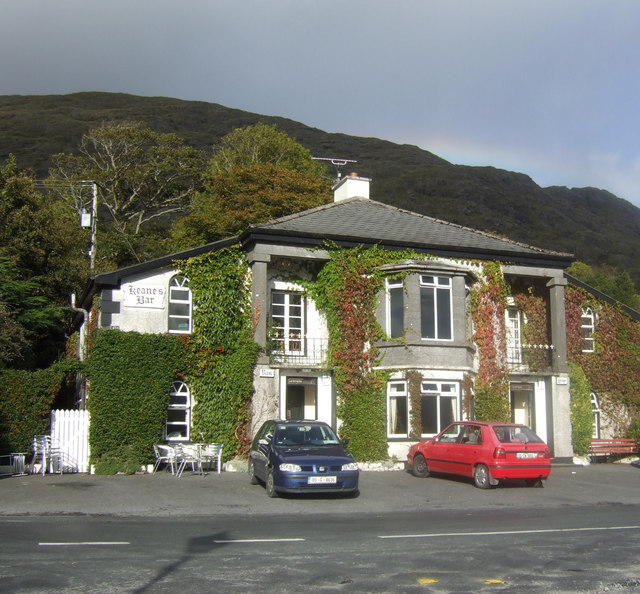
- Pub in Maum, County Galway

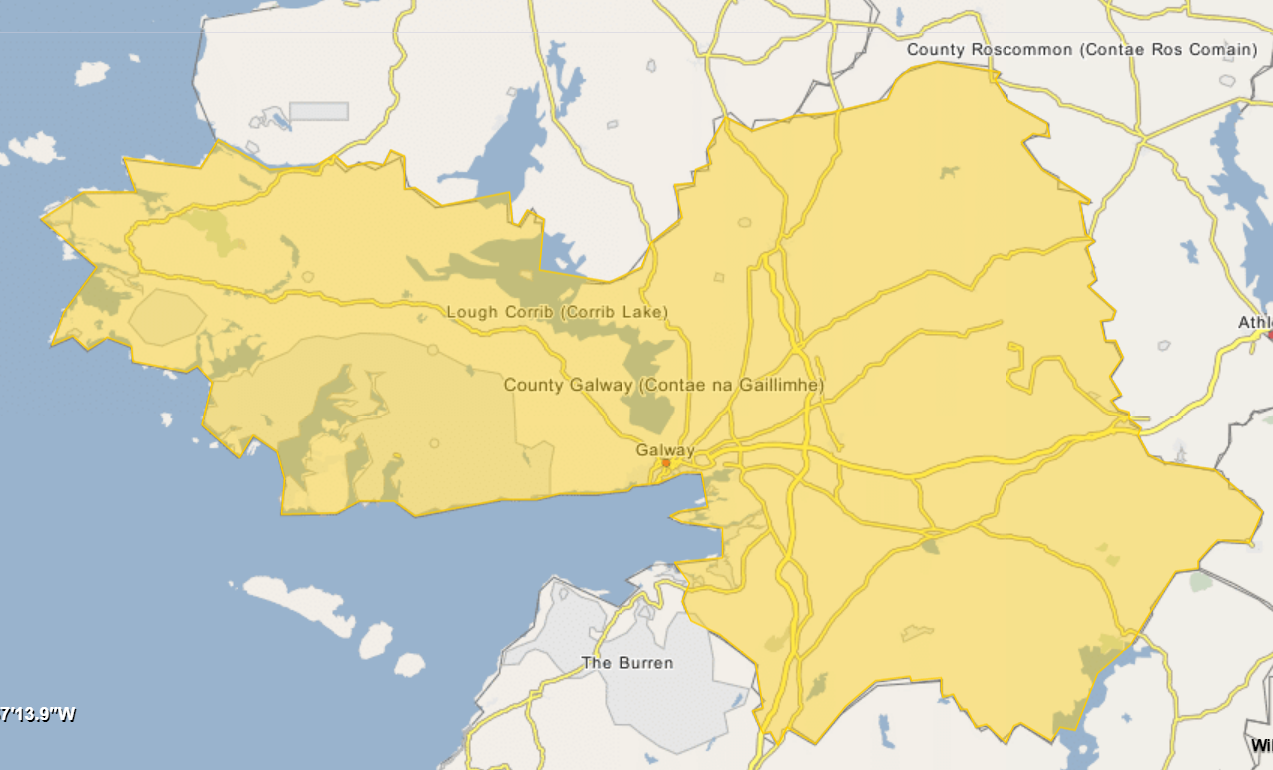
- Map of An Mám in County Galway An Mám (Ireland)
- Coordinates: 53°31′N 9°34′W
- Country: Ireland
- Province: Connacht
- County: County Galway
- Elevation: 52 m (171 ft)
- Time zone: UTC+0 (WET)
  - Summer (DST): UTC-1 (IST (WEST))
- Irish Grid Reference: L958533
- An Mám is the only official name. The anglicized spelling Maum has no official status.

An Mám (anglicized as Maum, or sometimes Maam) is a small Gaeltacht village and its surrounding lands in Connemara, County Galway, Ireland.

== Name ==
An Mám is Irish for "mountain pass" and as this is a Gaeltacht (principally Irish-speaking) area, the area's name formally exists only in Irish. Use of the English name is still common however.

== Location and access ==
The village is located at the southern end of the Maam Valley, where it comes to Lough Corrib; the other end lies at Leenaun on Killary Harbour. The settlement lies between where Joyce's River is captured by the larger Bealnabrack River, and where the Failmore River joins that river's mouth at the northern end of the lake. It sits at the edge of a mountainous area, the principal part of which forms the Maumturk or Maamturk Mountains.

An Mám lies north of Maam Cross, an important crossroads from which the main road serving the settlement, and providing a secondary route through the Maam Valley to Leenaun, the R336, comes, splitting off from the R59 Galway to Clifden road. Maam Bridge, built in 1823, takes the R336 across the Bealnabrack River.

== History ==
This area formed part of the wider Joyce Country, named for a key family grouping, the Joy family, originally from England, which arrived during the reign of Edward I and dominated the region for centuries after seizing large tracts of land.

== Features ==
Historically there was a castle in the area, and from the 19th century until 2004, a small courthouse existed in the village. Alexander Nimmo built an inn in 1820 at the eastern end of Maam Bridge, and this later became the Maum Hotel, owned by the family of Lord Leitrim for many years; it now operates as Keane's Pub.

Many community facilities are provided from Leenaun. There is free fishing in the river and in the nearer parts of lough corrib.

== See also ==
- List of towns and villages in Ireland
