= Ohio–Indiana League =

Class D level minor league baseball league

- Formerly: Ohio State League
- Classification: Class D (1907, 1948–1951)
- Sport: Minor League Baseball
- First season: 1907
- Folded: 1951
- Replaced by: Indiana-Ohio League (1908)
- President: Frank M. Colley (1948–1951)
- No. of teams: 13
- Country: United States of America
- Most titles: 3 Marion Red Sox (1949–1951)
- Related competitions: Ohio State League

The Ohio–Indiana League was a Class D level minor league baseball league that operated from 1948 to 1951. The league was composed of six teams from Ohio and two teams from Indiana. The Marion Red Sox won three consecutive league championships beginning in 1949. There was also a six–team Ohio–Indiana League that played the 1907 season.

== Cities represented ==
- Bluffton, Indiana: Bluffton Dregs (1907)
- Decatur, Indiana: Decatur Admirals (Indiana) (1907)
- Kokomo, Indiana - Sharpsville, IN: Kokomo-Sharpsville Combines (1907)
- Lima, Ohio: Lima Terriers (1948); Lima Chiefs 1949; Lima Phillies (1950–1951)
- Marion, Ohio: Marion Cubs (1948); Marion Red Sox (1949–1951)
- Muncie, Indiana: Muncie Reds (1948–1950)
- Newark, Ohio: Newark Yankees (1948–1951)
- Portland, Indiana: Portland Jay Birds (1907)
- Portsmouth, Ohio: Portsmouth A's (1948–1950)
- Richmond, Indiana: Richmond Quakers (1907); Richmond Roses (1948); Richmond Tigers (1949–1951)
- Springfield, Ohio: Springfield Giants (1948–1951)
- Van Wert, Ohio: Van Wert Buckeyes (1907)
- Zanesville, Ohio: Zanesville Dodgers (1948); Zanesville Indians (1949–1950)

== Standings & statistics ==
1907 Ohio–Indiana League

Team	W	L	W%	GB	Manager
Decatur Admirals	27	18	.600	–	Ralph Behringer
Portland Jay Birds	24	19	.558	1½	Lewis Hunt
Kokomo-Sharpsville Combines	24	22	.522	2½	Frank Morris
Richmond Quakers	23	24	.489	4	Clarence Jesup
Bluffton Dregs	21	25	.457	7	Frank Runyan
Van Wert Buckeyes	16	27	.437	9½	France / Al Hubbard

No playoffs held

1948 Ohio–Indiana League

Team	W	L	W%	GB	BA	FA	Attend	Manager
Zanesville Dodgers	82	57	.590	–	.278	.943	64,594	Ray Hathaway
Portsmouth A's	82	58	.586	½	.262	.942	73,533	George Staller
Muncie Reds	80	59	.576	2	.272	.944	50,925	Mike Blazo
Springfield Giants	66	74	.471	16½	.256	.938	67,558	Bob Roth / Rufus Jackson
Newark Yankees	65	74	.468	17	.261	.939	70,604	Bob Dill / Sol Mishkin
Richmond Roses	64	75	.460	18	.255	.936	58,039	Ollie Byers
Marion Cubs	62	78	.443	20½	.268	.933	60,009	Lou Bekeza / Francis Kristie
Lima Terriers	57	83	.407	25½	.261	.939	45,952	Charlie Engle

Playoffs - Zanesville Dodgers 4 games Springfield Giants 0; Playoffs - Muncie Packers 4 games Portsmouth A's 0
Finals - Zanesville Dodgers 4 games Muncie Packers 2

Player statistics
Player	Team	W	L	ERA	player	Team	AB	Hits	Avg
Ray Hathaway	Zanesville	23	7	2.82	Bob Nieman	Muncie	507	163	.367
Lawrence Miller	Muncie	16	7	3.17	George Staller	Portsmouth	489	163	.333
Irv Renollet	Zanesville	17	11	3.36	Joe Frisina	Lima	527	175	.332

1949 Ohio–Indiana League

Team	W	L	W%	GB	BA	FA	Attend	Manager
Portsmouth A's	81	58	.583	–	.253	.954	61,106	Homer Lee Cox
Springfield Giants	77	63	.550	4½	.273	.942	67,568	Tony Ravish
Muncie Reds	75	63	.543	5½	.272	.942	49,004	Mike Blazo
Marion Red Sox	73	64	.533	7	.268	.939	57,113	Wally Millies
Zanesville Indians	69	67	.507	10½	.253	.933	58,034	Pat McLaughlin
Newark Yankees	65	72	.474	15	.253	.945	62,321	Jim McLeod
Richmond Tigers	65	73	.471	15½	.256	.934	44,346	Cyril Pfeifer / Ken Holtcamp
Lima Chiefs	46	91	.336	34	.260	.925	31,298	Grover Hartley / George Kinnamon

Playoffs - Marion Red Sox 3 games Portsmouth A's 1; Playoffs - Muncie Reds 3 games Springfield Giants 1
Finals - Marion Red Sox 4 games Muncie Reds 3

Player statistics
Player	Team	W	L	ERA	player	Team	AB	Hits	Avg
Ewen Bryden	Portsmouth	16	8	1.82	Ralph Lucas	Springfield	447	155	.347
Allen Romberger	Portsmouth	19	6	2.03	Ben Haddix	Springfield	433	148	.342
Max Sumwalt	Muncie	12	3	2.78	George Contratto	Marion	429	145	.338

1950 Ohio–Indiana League

Team	W	L	W%	GB	BA	FA	Attend	Manager
Marion Red Sox	91	49	.650	–	.278	.941	41,002	George Susce / Elmer Yoter
Newark Yankees	89	49	.645	1	.279	.956	41,126	Billy Holm
Richmond Tigers	80	58	.580	10	.271	.943	45,302	Ralph DiLullo / Ken Holtcamp
Springfield Giants	72	64	.5294	17	.271	.944	37,619	Andy Gilbert
Muncie Reds	73	65	.5289	17	.264	.937	39,354	Mike Blazo
Lima Phillies	52	85	.380	37½	.252	.935	24,627	Frank McCormick
Portsmouth A's	46	89	.341	42½	.240	.942	21,685	Walt VanGrofski
Zanesville Indians	46	90	.338	43	.227	.939	22,888	J. Knowles Piercey

Playoffs - Marion Red Sox 3 games Springfield Giants 1;Playoffs - Newark Yankees 3 games Richmond Tigers 2
Finals - Marion Red Sox 4 games Newark Yankees 0

Player statistics
Player	Team	W	L	ERA	player	Team	AB	Hits	Avg
Billy Hoeft	Richmond	10	1	1.71	Andy Gilbert	Springfield	294	114	.388
Dan Searle	Richmond	13	3	2.12	Jim Engleman	Newark	558	208	.373
George Gheta	Newark	14	3	2.42	Hal W. Smith	Newark	480	174	.363

1951 Ohio–Indiana League

Team	W	L	W%	GB	BA	FA	Attend	Manager
Marion Red Sox	91	37	.711	–	.289	.943	24,710	Elmer Yoter
Springfield Giants	61	67	.477	30	.252	.935	45,862	Andy Gilbert
Richmond Tigers	53	74	.417	37½	.253	.929	20,004	Ralph DiLullo
Lima Phillies	41	86	.323	49½	.238	.937	33,440	Bernard Lutz
Newark Yankees	49	31	.613	NA	.256	.949	33,960	Bunny Mick

Newark won the first half which ended June 18. Newark folded July 17 and the second half was started over, won by Marion. The Springfield Giants were a playoff qualifier.

Playoffs - Marion Red Sox 4 games Springfield Giants 0

Player statistics
Player	Team	W	L	ERA	player	Team	AB	Hits	Avg
John Wall	Marion	9	1	2.45	Andy Gilbert	Springfield	323	123	.381
Dick Brodowski	Marion	21	5	2.60	Maxlee Ross	Marion	334	125	.374
Dan Sullivan	Newark	12	2	2.71	Marvin Stendel	Newark	502	185	.369
