= Newark Yankees =

- 1948–1951; (1944–1951); Newark, Ohio

Minor league affiliations
- Class: Class D (1944–1951)
- League: Ohio State League (1944–1947); Ohio-Indiana League (1948–1951)

Major league affiliations
- Team: St. Louis Browns (1944–1947); New York Yankees (1948–1951)

Minor league titles
- League titles (1): 1944
- Conference titles (1): 1951
- Wild card berths (3): 1944; 1946; 1950

Team data
- Name: Newark Moundsmen (1944–1947); Newark Yankees (1948–1951)
- Ballpark: White Field (1944–1946); Arnold Park (1947–1951)

The Newark Yankees were a minor league baseball team based in Newark, Ohio. From 1948 to 1951, the "Yankees" played as members of the Class D level Ohio-Indiana League as an affiliate of the New York Yankees.

Before the league changed names, the Newark "Moundsmen" played as members of the Class D level Ohio State League from 1944 to 1947, winning the 1944 league championship. The Moundsmen were a minor league affiliate of the St. Louis Browns.

Newark hosted minor league home games at White Field from 1944 to 1946 before moving to Arnold Park from 1947 to 1951.

== History ==
=== Ohio State League 1944 to 1947, championship ===
Minor league baseball began in Newark, Ohio with a team in the 1889 Ohio State League and continued to 1915 when the Newark New Socks played as members of the Class D level Buckeye League.

Newark returned to minor league play in 1944, when the Newark Moundsmen became members of the Class D level Ohio State League and won the Ohio State League Championship. The Moundsmen began play as an affiliate of the St. Louis Browns and played four seasons in the Ohio State League. The 1944 Ohio State League reformed as a six–team league in 1944 after a hiatus due to World War II. Playing with league members Lima Red Birds, Marion Diggers, Middletown Red Sox, Springfield Giants and Zanesville Dodgers, the Moundsmen finished second in the standings.

The Newark "Moundsmen" nickname was chosen as the result of a newspaper contest.

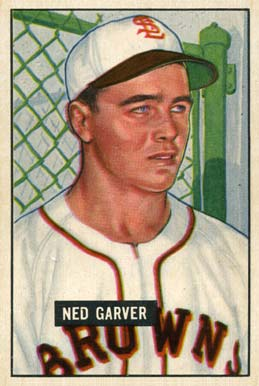
(1951) Ned Garver. St. Louis Browns. Bowman baseball card. Garver lead the Moundsmen to the 1944 Ohio State League championship, with 21 wins in the regular season and 3 in the playoff finals.

With a regular season record of 71–59, Newark ended the 1944 Ohio State regular season in second place and qualified for the playoffs. The Moundsmen finished 4.5 games behind the first place Springfield Giants, playing the season under manager Clay Bryant. In the first round of the 1944 playoffs the Newark Moundsmen defeated the Lima Red Birds 3 games to 1 and advanced. In the finals, Newark defeated the Middletown Red Sox 4 games to 2 to claim the championship. In the finals, Newark pitcher Ned Garver defeated the Middletown Red Sox three times, helping the Moundsmen win the championship. Ned Garver led the Ohio State league with 21 wins, 221 strikeouts and a 1.21 ERA. He also hit .407 in his pitching at bats. Teammate Luke Majorki won the league batting title, hitting .355.

Garver enjoyed his time in Newark. "It was a good baseball town – we drew big crowds." The fans were generous to the low-paid players, sometimes collecting $16 to $18 for Garver following a win. When someone stole his glove during the season, the fans raised him enough money to buy a new one. Local restaurants would give the pitchers free meals for winning games.

Continuing play in the 1945 Ohio State League, the Newark Moundsmen went from their championship to last place in the standings. With a 1945 regular season record of 57–82, the Moundsmen finished in sixth place in the six-team league. Playing the season under manager Mickey O'Neill, Newark finished 32.0 games behind the first place Middletown Rockets in the regular season standings and did not qualify for the playoffs won by Zanesville over Middletown. Newark's Albert Kaiser won the league batting championship, hitting .368 and his 12 home runs also led the league.

The 1946 Newark Moundsmen finished in fourth place as the Ohio State League expanded to eight teams, adding the Richmond Roses and Dayton Indians teams to the league. Newark qualified for the playoffs after the Moundsmen ended the regular season with a record of 74–65 under manager Bob Boken, finishing 8.0 games behind the Springfield Giants. In the first round of the playoffs, Newark lost to the Springfield Giants four games to two.

On June 28, 1946, Newark pitcher Carl Schulte threw a no-hitter in a 7–0 victory over the Richmond Roses.

In 1947, the Ohio State League played its final season, before changing its name. The Newark Moundsmen had a 64–76 regular season record and finished in seventh place, playing the season under manager Ed Dancisak. The Moundsmen finished the season 25.5 games behind the first place Zanesville Dodgers in the eight–team league. Ed Fowler of Newark led the Ohio State League with 119 RBI.

On June 6, 1947, William Woolard of Newark pitched a no–hitter in an 8–0 victory over the Muncie Reds.

=== Ohio-Indiana League 1948 to 1951 ===
In 1948, Newark played under a new affiliate as the franchise continued play as members of the eight-team Class D level Ohio-Indiana League, when the Ohio State League changed names. The Newark "Yankees" began play as an affiliate of the New York Yankees. The Lima Terriers, Marion Cubs, Muncie Reds, Portsmouth A's, Richmond Roses, Springfield Giants and Zanesville Dodgers teams joined the Newark Yankees in league play.

With a record of 64–74, Newark finished in fifth place in the 1948 Ohio-Indiana League standings. Managed by Bobby Dill and Solly Mishkin, Newark finished 17.0 games behind the first place Zanesville Dodgers. With their fifth-place finish, Newark did not qualify for the four-team playoffs won by Zanesville.

Continuing Ohio–Indiana League play, the 1949 Newark Yankees had a regular season record of 65–72. The Yankees placed sixth and were managed by Jim McLeod. Newark finished 15.0 games behind the first place Portsmouth A's and did not qualify for the playoffs. The league playoffs were won by the Marion Red Sox.

Yankee pitcher George Vinston threw a no–hitter on July 22, 1949, in a 3–0 victory over the Marion Red Sox.

The 1950 Newark Yankees reached the Ohio–Indiana League finals. With an 89–49 record, Newark placed second under manager Billy Holm. Newark finished 1.0 games behind the first place Marion Red Sox in the regular season standings of the eight-team league. In the first round of the playoffs, the Newark Yankees beat the Richmond Tigers 3 games to 2. In the finals, the Marion Red Sox beat the Newark Yankees 4 games to 0.

In their final season of play, the Newark Yankees won the first half standings in the Ohio–Indiana League, before folding during the season. The 1951 Yankees were managed by Malcolm Mickthen. Newark won the first half of the season by 2.5 games over the Marion Red Sox in the six-team league. On July 17, 1951, the Yankees had an overall record of 49–31 when the team folded. The Ohio–Indiana League permanently folded after the 1951 season was concluded.

Newark, Ohio did not resume minor league baseball play for over fourth years, until the 1994 Newark Buffalos began play as members of the Independent level Frontier League.

== The ballparks ==
From 1944 to 1946, the Newark Moundsmen teams played minor league home games at White Field. The ballpark site was located at the corner of North 11th Street and West Church Street. Today, White Field is still in use as a football stadium for the Newark School District teams. White Field is located at 70 North 11th Street, Newark, Ohio.

Beginning in 1947, the Newark Moundsmen and Yankees hosted minor league home games at Arnold Park. With a capacity of 3,000 in 1950, Arnold Park was located two blocks from White Field. In 1954, Arnold Park hosted an exhibition game between the Cleveland Indians and Detroit Tigers just before the start of the regular season. The ballpark was located at State Road 16 and State Road 79 in Newark, Ohio. The ballpark site was breached by highway construction and today Arnold Park is adjacent to the LIcking County Family YMCA facility. The YMCA is located at 470 West Church Street in Newark, Ohio.

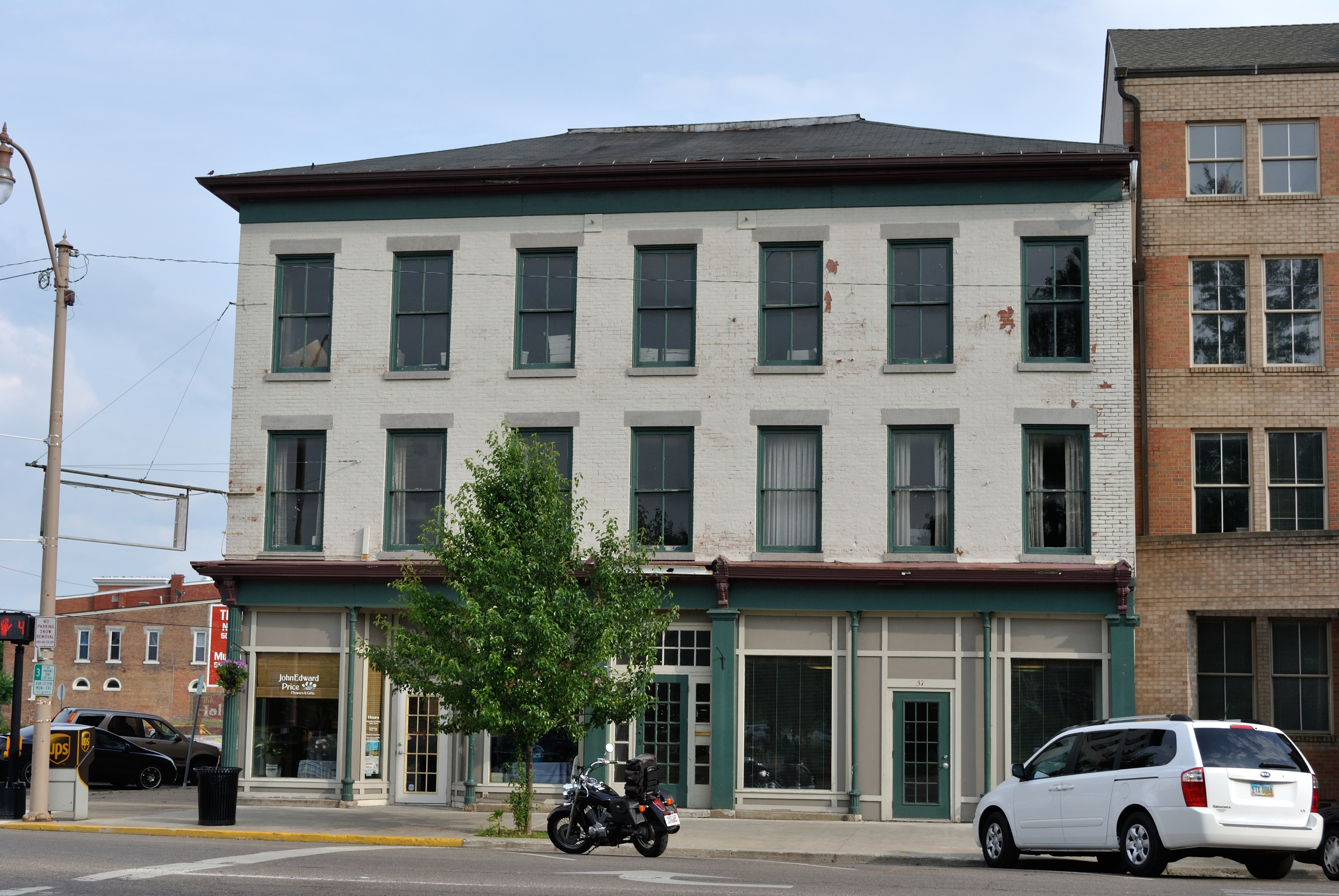
(2012) Courthouse Center. National Register of Historic Places. Newark, Ohio

== Timeline ==
Year(s)	# Yrs.	Team	Level	League	Affiliate	Ballpark
1944–1946	3	Newark Moundsmen	Class D	Ohio State League	St. Louis Browns	White Field
1947	1	Newark Moundsmen	Class D	Ohio State League	St. Louis Browns	Arnold Park
1948–1951	4	Newark Yankees	Class D	Ohio-Indiana League	New York Yankees	Arnold Park

== Year–by–year records ==
Year	Record	Finish	Manager	Playoffs
1944	71–59	2nd	Clay Bryant	League champions
1945	57–82	6th	Mickey O'Neil	Did not qualify
1946	74–65	4th	Bob Boken	Lost first round
1947	64–76	7th	Ed Dancisak	Did not qualify
1948	64–74	5th	Bobby Dill / Solly Mishkin	Did not qualify
1949	65–72	6th	Jim McLeod	Did not qualify
1950	89–49	2nd	Billy Holm	Lost in Finals
1951	49–31	NA	Malcolm Mick	Won 1st half Team folded July 17

== Notable alumni ==
- Bob Boken (1946, MGR)
- Leon Brinkopf (1944)
- Clay Bryant (1944, MGR)
- Owen Friend (1944)
- Ned Garver (1944)
- Cal Hogue (1945)
- Billy Holm (1950, MGR)
- Hal Hudson (1944–1945)
- Jim McLeod (1949, MGR)
- Connie O'Connor (1944–1945)
- Mickey O'Neil (1945, MGR)
- Hal Smith (1950)
- Newark Moundsmen players
- Newark Yankees players
