= Lima Phillies =

- 1950–1951; (1948–1951); Lima, Ohio

Minor league affiliations
- Class: Class D (1948–1951)
- League: Ohio-Indiana League (1948–1951)

Major league affiliations
- Team: Chicago White Sox (1948); Philadelphia Phillies (1950–1951)

Minor league titles
- League titles (0): None
- Wild card berths (0): None

Team data
- Name: Lima Terriers (1948); Lima Chiefs (1949); Lima Phillies (1950–1951)
- Ballpark: Halloran Park (1948–1949); Allen County Park (1950–1951)

The Lima Phillies were a minor league baseball team based in Lima, Ohio. The Lima "Phillies" were a minor league affiliate of the Philadelphia Phillies, playing as members of the Class D level Ohio-Indiana League in 1950 and 1951. The Phillies were preceded in Ohio–Indiana League play by the 1948 Lima Terriers, who were a minor league affiliate of the Chicago White Sox and the 1949 Lima Chiefs. Failing to qualify for the playoffs in each season, the Lima Ohio–Indiana League teams hosted minor league home games at Allen County Park.

== History ==
The 1948 Lima "Terriers" continued play in a newly named league after the Terriers had played the 1947 season as a member of the Class D level Ohio State League, which changed names for the 1948 season.

In 1948, the Ohio State League expanded beyond the state of Ohio and changed names to become the Class D level Ohio–Indiana League. The Muncie Reds joined seven returning Ohio State League teams in beginning league play on May 2, 1948.

The Lima franchise continued play in 1948, when the Ohio State League changed names. The Lima Terriers were an affiliate of the Chicago White Sox in 1948. The Marion Cubs, Muncie Reds, Newark Yankees, Portsmouth A's, Richmond Roses, Springfield Giants and Zanesville Dodgers joined Lima in league beginning Ohio–Indiana League play on May 2, 1948.

The Terriers finished in last place in the final regular season standings of the new league. With a record of 57–83, Lima ended the 1948 Ohio–Indiana League regular season in eighth place. Managed by Charlie Engle, the Terriers finished 25.5 games behind the first place Zanesville Dodgers and did not qualify for the four–team playoffs, won by Zanesville. Lima's Joe Frisina won the league batting championship, hitting .332.

Continuing Ohio–Indiana League play, the 1949 Lima team again finished in last place under a new nickname. The Lima "Chiefs" played without a major league affiliate. Managed by Grover Hartley and George Kinnamon, the Chiefs had a regular season record of 46–91 to finish in eighth place. Lima finished 34.0 games behind the first place Portsmouth A's and did not qualify for the playoffs, won by the Marion Red Sox.

Lima became a minor league affiliate of the Philadelphia Phillies in 1950, and began play as the Lima "Phillies," missing the Ohio–Indiana League playoffs. With an 52–85 record, the Phillies placed sixth in the eight team league, playing the season under manager Frank McCormick, a former major league All–Star player and 1940 Most Valuable Player. Lima finished 37.0 games behind the first place Marion Red Sox in the regular season standings.

In their final season of play, the 1951 Ohio–Indiana League compacted to become a five–team league to begin the season. The Newark Yankees won the first–half title in a split–season schedule, with the first half-season schedule ending on June 18, 1951. Newark then folded on July 17, 1951, leaving four remaining teams, Lima included, completing the second half of the season. Lima finished fourth and last in the final regular season standings. At the conclusion of the season, the Phillies finished 49.5 games behind the Marion Red Sox in the overall standings with a 41–86 record, playing the season under returning manager Barney Lutz. After a playoff won by the Marion Red Sox, the Ohio–Indiana League permanently folded following the completion of the 1951 season.

Lima, Ohio has not hosted another minor league team. In 2015, the Lima Locos began play as members of the Great Lakes Summer Collegiate League, a summer collegiate baseball league.

== The ballparks ==
In 1948 and 1949, the Lima Terriers and Chiefs played home minor league games at Halloran Park. The ballpark was destroyed by fire in 1949 and a new field was constructed to replace it. The ballpark was in a residential neighborhood on the north side of Lima. The ballpark hosted Baseball Hall of Fame members Josh Gibson, Buck Leonard, Jud Wilson and Ray Brown and the Homestead Grays in an exhibition game on August 28, 1942. Previously, Hall of famers Babe Ruth and Lou Gehrig made an appearance at the park in 1926.

In 1949 and 1950, the Lima Phillies of the Ohio–Indiana League hosted home minor league games at Allen County Park after a new field was built to replace Halloran Park. With a capacity of 3,750, the ballpark was located at 1920 Slabtown Road and had field dimensions of (left–center–right) of 325–425–295. Today, the site houses facilities and acreage for the Allen County Educational Services organization, using the same address. The adjoining public park is called the Allen County Farm Park, with a location of 1582 Slabtown Road.

== Timeline ==
Year(s)	# Yrs.	Team	Level	League	Affiliate	Ballpark
1948	1	Lima Terriers	Class D	Ohio-Indiana League	Chicago White Sox	Halloran Park
1949	1	Lima Chiefs	Class D	Ohio-Indiana League	None	Allen County Park
1950–1951	2	Lima Phillies	Class D	Ohio-Indiana League	Philadelphia Phillies	Allen County Park

== Year–by–year records ==
Year	Record	Finish	Manager	Attend	Playoffs
1948	57–83	8th	Charlie Engle	45,952	Did not qualify
1949	46–91	8th	George Kinnamon / Grover Hartley	31,298	Did not qualify
1950	52–85	6th	Frank McCormick	24,627	Did not qualify
1951	41–86	4th	Barney Lutz	33,440	Did not qualify

== Notable alumni ==
- Charlie Engle (1948, MGR)
- Don Erickson (1951)
- Grover Hartley (1949, MGR)
- Barney Lutz (1951, MGR)
- Frank McCormick (1950, MGR) 9x MLB All-Star; 1940 NL M.V.P.
- Sonny Senerchia (1949)
- Lima Terriers players
- Lima Chiefs players
- Lima Phillies players
