= Zanesville Dodgers =

- 1944–1948; Zanesville, Ohio

Minor league affiliations
- Class: Class D (1944–1948)
- League: Ohio State League (1944–1947); Ohio–Indiana League (1948)

Major league affiliations
- Team: Brooklyn Dodgers (1944–1948)

Minor league titles
- League titles (4): 1945; 1946; 1947; 1948
- Conference titles (2): 1947; 1948
- Wild card berths (2): 1945; 1946

Team data
- Name: Zanesville Dodgers (1944–1948)
- Ballpark: Gant Park Municipal Stadium (1944–1948)

The Zanesville Dodgers were a minor league baseball team based in Zanesville, Ohio. The Dodgers were a minor league affiliate of the Brooklyn Dodgers and played as members of the Class D level Ohio State League from 1944 to 1947, before the league changed names in 1948 to become the Class D level Ohio–Indiana League. The Dodgers won four consecutive league championships from 1945 to 1948. Zanesville hosted minor league home games at Gant Park Municipal Stadium.

== History ==
=== Ohio State League 1944 to 1947 ===
After minor league baseball in Zanesville began with the 1887 Zanesville Kickapoos, who played the season as charter members of the Ohio State League, the 1944 Zanesville Dodgers were immediately preceded in minor league play by the 1942 Zanesville Cubs of the Class C level Middle Atlantic League.

After a one season hiatus during World War II, Zanesville resumed minor league baseball play in 1944, when the Dodgers became members of the six–team Class D level Ohio State League, which resumed play following World War II. The Lima Red Birds, Marion Diggers, Middletown Red Sox, Newark Moundsmen, Richmond Roses and Springfield Giants joined Zanesville in beginning league play on May 2, 1944.

The Zanesville "Dodgers" were a minor league affiliate of the Brooklyn Dodgers, adopting the team's nickname. In their first season of play, the Dodgers placed fifth in the Ohio State League standings. Zanesville ended the Ohio State League season with a record of 58–71, finishing 17½ games behind the first place Springfield Giants, as Jack Knight served as manager. Zanesville did not qualify for the four-team playoffs, won by the Middletown Red Sox.

The Dodgers won their first of four consecutive league championships in the 1945 Ohio State League. With a record of 74–66, Zanesville placed second in the six–team league regular season, playing the season under managers Jack Knight, Ray Hayworth, Eric McNair, Maurice Mikesell and Clay Bryant. The Dodgers and finishing 15½ games behind the first place Middletown Rockets. In the playoffs, Zanesville defeated the Lima Red Birds four games to two in the first round. Zanesville won the championship in defeating Middleton three games to two.

The Dodgers defended their league championship as the 1946 Ohio State League expanded from six teams to eight teams. The Dodgers ended the regular season with a record of 78–60 to place second in the Ohio State League regular season, finishing 3½ games behind the first place Springfield Giants. Clay Bryant returned as manager. In the playoffs, Zanesville swept the Richmond Roses in four games and advanced. In the finals, the Dodgers defeated the Springfield Giants four games to two to win their second consecutive league title. Maynard DeWitt of Zanesville won the league batting title, hitting .351.

Continuing play in the final of the Ohio State League, the Dodgers won the pennant and their third consecutive championship. With Clay Bryant continuing as manager, Zanesville ended the 1947 regular season with a record of 89–50, finishing 10.0 games ahead of the second place Marion Cubs. In the first round of the playoffs, the Dodgers defeated the Springfield Giants four games to two. In the Finals, Zanesville won the championship in defeating Marion four games to two. Zanesville drew 102,000 fans for the season. Zanesville pitcher Clayton Lambert led the Ohio State League with both 23 wins and 232 strikeouts.

=== Ohio–Indiana League 1948 ===
In 1948, the Ohio State League expanded beyond the state of Ohio and changed names to become the Class D level Ohio–Indiana League. The Muncie Reds were the new Indiana based franchise, joined in league play the Marion Cubs, Newark Yankees, Portsmouth A's, Richmond Roses, Springfield Giants and Zanesville Dodgers teams in beginning league play on May 2, 1948.

The 1948 Zanesville Dodgers continued as a minor league affiliate of the Brooklyn Dodgers and won their fourth consecutive championship in the newly named league. The Dodgers won the 1948 Ohio–Indiana League pennant, finishing the regular season in first place. The Dodgers ended the regular season record of 82–57, playing under managers Ray Hathaway and Pat McLaughlin, finishing just ½ game ahead of the Portsmouth A's (82-58) in the regular season final standings. In the playoffs, Zanesville swept the Springfield Giants in four games in their first round series. The Dodgers won their fourth championship with a win in the Finals in six games over the Muncie Reds. Their victory was the final one for the Dodgers' teams in Zanesville. Player/manager Ray Hathaway led the Ohio-Indiana League pitchers with a 23-7 record.

Zanesville continued Ohio–Indiana League play in the 1949 season with a new affiliate. The franchise became a minor league affiliate of the Cleveland Indians and began play as the Zanesville Indians, missing the playoffs, as Pat McLaughlin continued as the Zanesville manager. The Zanesville Indians folded following a last place finish in the 1950 season. and the league folded following the 1951 season.

== The ballpark ==
The Zanesville Dodgers teams hosted home minor league home games at Gant Park Municipal Stadium. The ballpark had a capacity of 6,00 and field dimensions of (Left, Center, Right): 320-380-320. Called simply "Municipal Stadium" in the Dodgers era. In 1948, a box seat ticket price was $1.10, the grandstand $0.75 and the bleachers were $0.50. The facility was named for Nelson T. Gant who was the former owner of the property before donating it. Constructed in 1939, "Gant Stadium" is still in use today, with renovations done in 2021. Located on West Main Street, in 2021 Gant Stadium and the site received State Historic Designation, as a historic location.

== Timeline ==
Year(s)	# Yrs.	Team	Level	League	Affiliate	Ballpark
1944–1947	4	Zanesville Dodgers	Class D	Ohio State League	Brooklyn Dodgers	Gant Park Municipal Stadium
1948	1	Zanesville Dodgers	Class D	Ohio–Indiana League	Brooklyn Dodgers	Gant Park Municipal Stadium

== Year–by–year records ==
Year	Record	Finish	Manager	Playoffs / notes
1944	58–71	5th	Jack Knight	Did not qualify
1945	74–66	2nd	Jack Knight / Eric McNair; Ray Hayworth / Maurice Mikesell; Clay Bryant	League champions
1946	78–6057	2nd	Clay Bryant	League champions
1947	89–50	1st	Clay Bryant	Won pennant League champions
1948	82–57	1st	Ray Hathaway / Pat McLaughlin	Won pennant League champions

== Notable alumni ==
- Clay Bryant (1945-1946 MGR)
- Ray Hathaway (1948, MGR)
- Chris Haughey (1946)
- Ray Hayworth (1945, MGR)
- Jack Knight (1944, MGR)
- Steve Lembo (1944)
- Pat McLaughlin (1948, MGR)
- Eric McNair (1945, MGR)
- Preston Ward (1944)
- Henry Welsch (1945)
- Zanesville Dodgers players
