= Richmond Tigers (baseball) =

- 1946–1951; Richmond, Indiana

Minor league affiliations
- Class: Class D (1946–1951)
- League: Ohio–Indiana League (1948–1951); Ohio State League (1946–1947)

Major league affiliations
- Team: Detroit Tigers (1949–1951); Boston Braves (1946–1948)

Minor league titles
- League titles (0): None
- Wild card berths (2): 1946; 1950

Team data
- Name: Richmond Tigers (1949–1951); Richmond Roses (1946–1948)
- Ballpark: Municipal Ball Park (1946–1951)

The Richmond Tigers were a minor league baseball team based in Richmond, Indiana. From 1949 to 1951, the "Tigers" played as members of the Class D level Ohio–Indiana League as an affiliate of the Detroit Tigers. Richmond began play in the Ohio–Indiana League as the Richmond "Roses," who played in the Class D level Ohio State League in 1946 and 1947, before the league changed names in 1948. The Roses were an affiliate of the Boston Braves. The Richmond teams hosted minor league home games at Municipal Ball Park.

Baseball Hall of Fame member Jim Bunning played for the 1950 Richmond Tigers in his first professional season.

== History ==
After minor league baseball in Richmond began with the 1907 Richmond Quakers franchise of the Ohio-Indiana League, the Richmond Roses were preceded by the 1930 Richmond "Roses" of the Class B level Central League.

In 1946, the Richmond "Roses" resumed minor league baseball play, as members of the eight–team Class D level Ohio State League. Richmond was an expansion team in the league, which was grown from a six–team league in 1945, by adding the Richmond team and the Dayton Indians. The Dayton Indians, Lima Terriers, Marion Cardinals, Middletown Rockets, Newark Moundsmen, Springfield Giants and Zanesville Dodgers teams joined Richmond in beginning league play on April 30, 1946.

The Richmond Roses were an affiliate of the Boston Braves. Richmond ended the 1946 Ohio State League season with a record of 76–63, placing third in the Ohio State League, finishing 6.0 games behind the first place Springfield Giants. Merle Settlemire served as manager, as the Roses qualified for the playoffs. The Zanesville Dodgers defeated Richmond in a four–game sweep in the first round of playoffs.

Continuing play in the 1947 Ohio State League, the Roses placed fifth and did not qualify for the playoffs. Richmond ended the 1947 regular season with a record of 62–72, finishing 24.5 games behind the first place Zanesville Dodgers. The Roses were managed by Rex Carr. Richmond's Robert Verrier led the league with 127 runs scored.

In 1948, the Ohio State League had expanded beyond the state of Ohio and the league was renamed to become the Class D level Ohio–Indiana League. The Muncie Reds franchise joined with seven Ohio based teams in beginning league play on May 2, 1948.

The Roses continued as a minor league affiliate of the Boston Braves in 1948. Ending the 1948 Ohio–Indiana League season in sixth place, Richmond did not qualify for the playoffs of the eight–team league. The Roses had a record of 64–75, playing under manager Ollie Byers and finished 18.0 games behind the first place Zanesville Dodgers in the regular season final standings.

In 1949, Richmond became a minor league affiliate of the Detroit Tigers and adopted their nickname. The newly named Richmond "Tigers" placed seventh in the regular season Ohio State League final regular season standings. The Tigers ended the regular season with a record of 65–73, playing the season under managers Cyril Pfeifer and Kenneth Holtcamp. The Tigers finished 15.5 games behind the first place Portsmouth A's and did not qualify for the four-team playoffs.

The Richmond Tigers qualified for the 1950 Ohio-Indiana League playoffs. Managed by the returning Kenneth Holtcamp, the Tigers ended the 1950 regular season with a record of 80–58, placing third in the standings, while finishing 10.0 games behind the pennant winning Marion Red Sox. In the playoffs, the Newark Yankees defeated Richmond 3 games to 2 in the first round. Billy Hoeft of Richmond led the league with a 1.71 ERA and teammate Dan Searle finished second with an ERA of 2.12.

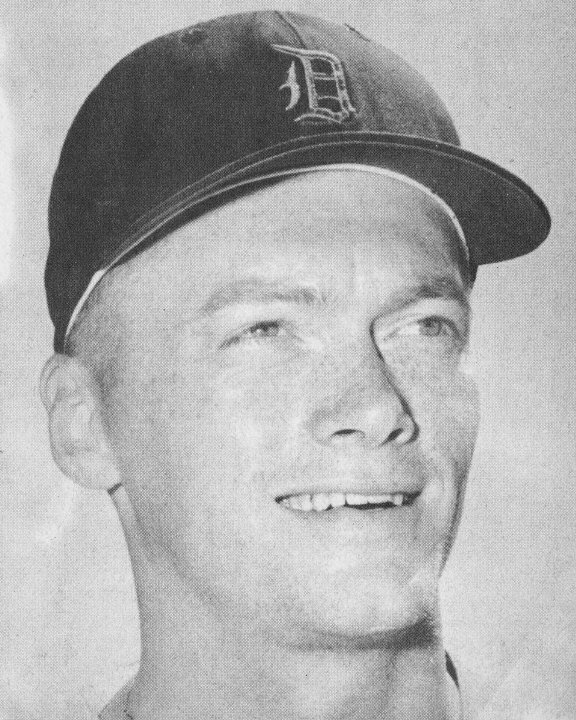
(1955) Jim Bunning, Detroit Tigers

Baseball Hall of Fame member Jim Bunning played for the 1950 Richmond Tigers. At age 18, if his first professional season, Bunning compiled a 7–8 record with a 3.22 ERA in 17 games and 123 innings pitched for Richmond. Bunning graduated from high school in 1949 and was attending Xavier University, playing on a baseball scholarship. Bunning was signed by the Detroit Tigers in May, 1950 and joined the Richmond Tigers after finishing his spring semester at Xavier. Bunning received a $4,000 signing bonus and a $150.00 per month salary. Bunning was inducted into the Baseball Hall of Fame in 1996 and his number 14 is retired by the Philadelphia Phillies.

In its final season of play, the 1951 Ohio–Indiana League compacted to become a five–team league. The Newark Yankees won the first–half title in a split–season schedule, with the first–half season schedule ending on June 18, 1951. Newark then folded on July 17, 1951, with the four remaining teams, Richmond included, completing the second–half of the season. At the conclusion of the season, the Tigers finished 37.5 games behind the Marion Red Sox in the overall standings with a 53–74 record, playing the season under manager Ralph DiLullo. The Ohio–Indiana League permanently folded following the completion of the 1951 season.

Following the Tigers, Richmond was without minor league baseball until the 1995 Richmond Roosters began play in the independent Frontier League.

== The ballpark ==
The Richmond Roses and Tigers teams played minor league home games at Municipal Ball Park. Constructed in 1936, the ballpark was later renamed to become Don McBride Stadium. The Don McBride Stadium is still in use today, located at 204 NW 13st Street in Richmond, Indiana.

== Timeline ==
Year(s)	# Yrs.	Team	Level	League	Affiliate	Ballpark
1946–1947	2	Richmond Roses	Class D	Ohio State League	Boston Braves	Municipal Ball Park
1948	1	Richmond Roses	Class D	Ohio–Indiana League	Boston Braves	Municipal Ball Park
1949–1951	3	Richmond Tigers	Class D	Ohio–Indiana League	Detroit Tigers	Municipal Ball Park

== Year–by–year records ==
Year	Record	Finish	Manager	Attend	Playoffs / notes
1946	76–63	3rd	Merle Settlemire	NA	Lost in 1st round
1947	62–72	5th	Rex Carr	53,050	Did not qualify
1948	64–75	6th	Ollie Byers	58,039	Did not qualify
1949	65–73	7th	Cyril Pfeifer / Kenneth Holtcamp	44,346	Did not qualify
1950	80–58	3rd	Kenneth Holtcamp	45,302	Lost in 1st round
1951	53–74	3rd	Ralph DiLullo	20,004	Did not qualify

== Notable alumni ==
- Jim Bunning (1950) Inducted Baseball Hall of Fame, 1996
- George Bullard (1951)
- Ralph DiLullo (1951, MGR)
- Billy Hoeft (1950)
- Les Pinkham (1951)
- Hank Raymonds (1948)
- Merle Settlemire (1946, MGR)
- Ron Shoop (1951)

== See also ==
- Richmond Roses players
- Richmond Tigers players
