= 1950 Detroit Tigers season =

Major League Baseball season

1950 Detroit Tigers
- League: American League
- Ballpark: Briggs Stadium
- City: Detroit
- Record: 95–59 (.617)
- League place: 2nd
- Owners: Walter Briggs, Sr.
- General managers: Billy Evans
- Managers: Red Rolfe
- Television: WWJ (Harry Heilmann, Paul Williams, Ty Tyson)
- Radio: WJBK/WXYZ (Harry Heilmann)

The 1950 Detroit Tigers were a professional baseball team that represented Detroit in the American League (AL) during the 1950 baseball season. The team compiled a record of 95–59 (.617), the second best record in the major leagues, behind the New York Yankees. The Tigers spent most of the season in first place but lost the pennant to the Yankees in the final two weeks of the season. Red Rolfe was the team's manager for the second season and received the Sporting News Manager of the Year Award. The Tigers' home attendance of 1,951,474 was a team record at the time and the second highest in the major leagues during the 1950 season.

The pitching staff was led by Art Houtteman who compiled a 19–12 record and a 3.54 earned run average (ERA) and pitched 21 complete games. Dizzy Trout led the team with a .722 winning percentage (second best in the AL) with a 13–5 record and 3.75 ERA. Fred Hutchinson compiled a 17–8 record. The team's overall ERA of 4.12 was second best in the AL.

The batters were led by third baseman George Kell who led the AL with 218 hits and 56 doubles, ranked second with a .340 batting average, and finished fourth in the American League Most Valuable Player (AL MVP) voting. Right fielder Vic Wertz led the team with 27 home runs and 123 RBIs and finished 10th in the AL MVP voting. Center fielder Hoot Evers had a .323 batting average and 109 RBIs, led the AL with 11 triples, ranked third in slugging percentage (.551), led AL outfielders in fielding percentage (.997) (one error in 336 total chances), and finished 11th in the AL MVP voting. Second baseman Jerry Priddy led AL second basemen with 542 assists and 150 double plays and finished 17th in the AL MVP voting. Shortstop Johnny Lipon compiled a .378 on-base percentage and led AL shortstops with 483 assists and 126 double plays.

== Season standings ==
American League
Team	W	L	Pct.	GB	Home	Road
New York Yankees	98	56	.636	—	53‍–‍24	45‍–‍32
Detroit Tigers	95	59	.617	3	50‍–‍30	45‍–‍29
Boston Red Sox	94	60	.610	4	55‍–‍22	39‍–‍38
Cleveland Indians	92	62	.597	6	49‍–‍28	43‍–‍34
Washington Senators	67	87	.435	31	35‍–‍42	32‍–‍45
Chicago White Sox	60	94	.390	38	35‍–‍42	25‍–‍52
St. Louis Browns	58	96	.377	40	27‍–‍47	31‍–‍49
Philadelphia Athletics	52	102	.338	46	29‍–‍48	23‍–‍54

== Roster ==
1950 Detroit Tigers
Roster
Pitchers: 15 Hank Borowy; 31 Paul Calvert; 30 Bill Connelly; 34 Ted Gray; 24,30 Ray Herbert; 12 Art Houtteman; 29 Fred Hutchinson; 16 Hal Newhouser; 23 Saul Rogovin; 24 Marlin Stuart; 11 Dizzy Trout; 22 Virgil Trucks; 25 Hal White	Catchers: 26 Joe Ginsberg; 35 Frank House; 1 Aaron Robinson; 9 Bob Swift; Infielders: 8 Neil Berry; 21 George Kell; 17 Don Kolloway; 19,30 Dick Kryhoski; 7 Eddie Lake; 2 Johnny Lipon; 4 Jerry Priddy	Outfielders: 14 Hoot Evers; 3 Johnny Groth; 27 Charlie Keller; 6 Pat Mullin; 20 Vic Wertz; Other batters: 15 Paul Campbell	Manager: 10 Red Rolfe; Coaches: 28 Dick Bartell; 36 Rick Ferrell; 33 Ted Lyons

== Player stats ==
=== Batting ===
= Indicates team leader

= Indicates league leader

==== Starters by position ====
Note: Pos = Position; G = Games played; AB = At bats; H = Hits; Avg. = Batting average; HR = Home runs; RBI = Runs batted in

Pos	Player	G	AB	H	Avg.	HR	RBI
C	Aaron Robinson	107	283	64	.226	9	37
1B	Don Kolloway	125	467	135	.289	6	32
2B	Jerry Priddy	157	618	171	.277	13	75
3B	George Kell	157	641	218	.340	8	101
SS	Johnny Lipon	147	601	176	.293	2	63
OF	Johnny Groth	157	566	173	.306	12	85
OF	Vic Wertz	149	559	172	.308	27	123
OF	Hoot Evers	143	526	170	.323	21	103

==== Other batters ====
Note: G = Games played; AB = At bats; H = Hits; Avg. = Batting average; HR = Home runs; RBI = Runs batted in

Player	G	AB	H	Avg.	HR	RBI
Dick Kryhoski	53	169	37	.219	4	19
Pat Mullin	69	142	31	.218	6	23
Bob Swift	67	132	30	.227	2	9
Joe Ginsberg	36	95	22	.232	0	12
Charlie Keller	50	51	16	.314	2	16
Neil Berry	39	40	10	.250	0	7
Eddie Lake	20	7	0	.000	0	0
Frank House	5	5	2	.400	0	0
Paul Campbell	3	1	0	.000	0	0

Note: pitchers' batting statistics not included

=== Pitching ===
==== Starting pitchers ====
Note: G = Games pitched; IP = Innings pitched; W = Wins; L = Losses; ERA = Earned run average; SO = Strikeouts

Player	G	IP	W	L	ERA	SO
Art Houtteman	41	274.2	19	12	3.54	88
Fred Hutchinson	39	231.2	17	8	2.96	71
Hal Newhouser	35	213.2	15	13	4.34	87
Dizzy Trout	34	184.2	13	5	3.75	88
Ted Gray	27	149.1	10	7	4.40	102
Virgil Trucks	7	48.1	3	1	3.54	25

==== Other pitchers ====
Note: G = Games pitched; IP = Innings pitched; W = Wins; L = Losses; ERA = Earned run average; SO = Strikeouts

Player	G	IP	W	L	ERA	SO
Hal White	42	111.0	9	6	4.54	53
Saul Rogovin	11	40.0	2	1	4.50	11
Hank Borowy	13	32.2	1	1	3.31	12
Ray Herbert	8	22.1	1	2	3.63	5

==== Relief pitchers ====
Note: G = Games pitched; W = Wins; L = Losses; SV = Saves; ERA = Earned run average; SO = Strikeouts

Player	G	W	L	SV	ERA	SO
Paul Calvert	32	2	2	4	6.31	14
Marlin Stuart	19	3	1	2	5.56	19
Bill Connelly	2	0	0	0	6.75	1

== Record vs. opponents ==
1950 American League record Sources:
Team	BOS	CWS	CLE	DET	NYY	PHA	SLB	WSH
Boston	—	15–7	10–12	10–12	9–13	19–3	19–3	12–10
Chicago	7–15	—	8–14	6–16–2	8–14	11–11	12–10	8–14
Cleveland	12–10	14–8	—	13–9–1	8–14	17–5	13–9	15–7
Detroit	12–10	16–6–2	9–13–1	—	11–11	17–5	17–5	13–9
New York	13–9	14–8	14–8	11–11	—	15–7	17–5	14–8–1
Philadelphia	3–19	11–11	5–17	5–17	7–15	—	8–14	13–9
St. Louis	3–19	10–12	9–13	5–17	5–17	14–8	—	12–10
Washington	10–12	14–8	7–15	9–13	8–14–1	9–13	10–12	—

== Season chronology ==
=== Preseason roster changes ===
- December 14: The Tigers acquired second baseman Jerry Priddy from the St. Louis Browns in exchange for pitcher Lou Kretlow and $150,000 in cash.
- December 17: The Tigers traded outfielder Dick Wakefield to the New York Yankees in exchange for first baseman Dick Kryhoski.
- December 29: The Tigers signed outfielder Charlie "King Kong" Keller three months after he was unconditionally released by the Yankees. Keller had undergone back surgery three years earlier and appeared in only 41 games in 1949.
- February 15: The Tigers acquired pitcher Paul Calvert from the Washington Senators for the $10,000 waiver price.

=== April ===
- April 18: On Opening Day, the Tigers beat the Cleveland Indians, 7–6, before a crowd of 65,744 in Cleveland. Dick Kryhoski had three hits and had the game-winning RBI in the 10th inning.
- April 20: The Tigers defeated the Indians, 5–4, in the second game of the season. Pitcher Ted Gray threw a six-hitter for Detroit.
- April 21: In the home opener at Briggs Stadium, the Tigers defeated the Chicago White Sox, 5–1, before a crowd of 44,642. The victory was fueled by home runs by Johnny Groth in the seventh inning and Vic Wertz in the eighth inning. Virgil Trucks threw a five-hitter and was the winning pitcher.
- April 22: The Tigers beat the White Sox, 5–0, behind the four-hit, shutout pitching of Art Houtteman, to start the season 4–0.
- April 23: The Tigers lost to the White Sox, 5–4. It was the Tigers' first loss of the season and the White Sox' first victory. Fred Hutchinson and George Kell both committed errors in the sixth inning during which the Sox scored three runs. Johnny Groth had three hits and a walk for Detroit. Detroit native Billy Pierce was the winning pitcher for Chicago.
- April 25: The Tigers defeated the St. Louis Browns, 5–2, in St. Louis. Virgil Trucks won the game, giving up only one hit in eight innings before being pulled in the ninth. Jerry Priddy and Johnny Groth hit home runs.
- April 26: The Tigers defeated the Browns, 8–6, in 10 innings. Paul Calvert got the victory after pitching two perfect innings in relief. George Kell hit the game-winning RBI in the 10th inning. The game attracted a crowd of only 1,802 to the stadium in St. Louis. The victory gave the Tigers a 6–1 record.
- April 27: Bob Feller held the Tigers to eight hits as the Indians won by a 6–1 score.
- April 30: In a double-header in Chicago, the Tigers lost the opener by a 5–0 score and settled for a 7–7 tie in the second game.

=== May ===
- May 1–3: Three consecutive games with the Philadelphia Athletics were cancelled after "a week of rain ... turned Shibe Park into a virtual quagmire."
- May 4: The Tigers defeated the Athletics, 8–5, as Art Houtteman pitched a five-hitter for his third victory of the season. The game attracted a crowd of only 1,901 to Shibe Park. Dick Kryhoski hit his first home run as a Tiger. Jerry Priddy and Vic Wertz had three hits each.
- May 5: The Tigers defeated the Washington Senators, 9–6, in Washington, D.C. Dizzy Trout got the win, pitching in relief. Detroit scored five unearned runs as Washington errors. The victory gave the Tigers an 8–3 record and kept them in first place.
- May 6: The Tigers defeated Washington, 8–6. Fred Hutchinson got his first victory of the season. Three of Washington's runs were unearned, resulting from an error in the fifth inning when Johnny Groth misjudged a fly ball. The victory gave the Tigers a 9–3 record and kept them in first place.
- May 7: In the first meeting of the year between the Tigers and Yankees, the Yankees prevailed by a 6–3 score before a crowd of 54,027 at Yankee Stadium. The Tigers committed three errors (two by Johnny Groth) in the eighth inning, leading to three Yankee runs.
- May 8: The Tigers won the second game with the Yankees by a 7–1 score. Art Houtteman pitched a complete game and got his fourth victory of the season. George Kell and Vic Wertz hit triples, and Hoot Evers hit a home run.
- May 9: The Tigers lost to the Boston Red Sox, 6–1, at Fenway Park. Bobby Doerr and Walt Dropo hit home runs for Boston. The loss allowed Boston tom move into a tie with Detroit for first place.
- May 11: The Tigers swept the Red Sox in a double header at Fenway Park (13–4 and 5–3). With the victories, the Tigers regained sole possession of first place. The Tigers won the second game after Ted Williams committed an error with the bases loaded.
- May 13: The Tigers defeated the St. Louis Browns, 1–0, at Briggs Stadium. Virgil Trucks pitched a complete game shutout. Vic Wertz hit a solo home run in the bottom of the 11th inning. The Tigers improved to 13-5 and remained 1/2 game ahead of New York and Boston.
- May 14: Hal Newhouser, sidelined for the first month of the season with a sore pitching arm, made his 1950 debut. The Browns won, 7–3, as Newhouser walked four batters, hit another batter with a pitch, gave up a grand slam to Roy Sievers in the first inning, and lasted only three innings. Newhouser's debut drew a Sunday crowd of 30,794 to Briggs Stadium.
- May 16: The Tigers lost to the Red Sox, 6–1, in Detroit. Art Houtteman was the losing pitcher. Ted Williams and Vern Stephens each hit two home runs for Boston. The loss allowed the Yankees to move into first place, a half game ahead of the Tigers.
- May 17: The Tigers defeated the Red Sox, 6–3. Pitcher Ted Gray got the victory for the Tigers, despite giving up to home runs by Walt Dropo.
- May 18: After trailing by 10 runs, the Tigers staged a comeback but fell short, losing by a 13–12 score to the Red Sox.
- May 19: The Tigers sent 14 batters to the plate and scored 10 runs in the fifth inning to beat the Athletics‚ 14–8. George Kell and Vic Wertz each had two hits in the inning. Virgil Trucks‚ a 19-game winner in 1949‚ hurt his arm and was lost for the season. Fred Hutchinson pitched in relief and picked up the win.
- May 20: Detroit second baseman Jerry Priddy started a record five double plays in the first five innings to lead the Tigers to a 5–3 win over the A's. Shortstop Johnny Lipon participated in all the double plays to tie an AL record. Art Houtteman won his fifth game.
- May 21: The Tigers lost to the Washington Senators, 6–2, before a Sunday crowd of 33,320 at Briggs Stadium. Washington pitcher Conrado Marrero held the Tigers to three hits, one of them a two-run home run by Aaron Robinson.
- May 22: In his second start of the season, Hal Newhouser pitched a complete game and held the Senators to one run as the Tigers won by a 5–1 score. Dick Kryhoski hit a three-run home run, and Johnny Lipon had four hits.
- May 23: The Tigers lost to the Senators, 8–2. The Tigers led, 2–0, after eight innings, but the Senators scored eight runs in the ninth inning.
- May 25: The Tigers lost to the Yankees, 6–4, in Detroit. Yogi Berra hit a grand slam home run off Art Houtteman in the fifth inning.
- May 26: The Tiger bet the Browns, 11–2, in St. Louis. In his third start, Hal Newhouser struck out the first three batters and held the Browns to six hits. Vic Wertz hit a three-run home run in the first inning. George Kell had a single, double, and triple.
- May 27: The Tigers defeated St. Louis, 8–6, before a crowd of only 1,305 at Sportsman's Park. Hoot Evers had three hits and drove in five runs. George Kell also had three hit, and Ted Gray got the win.
- May 28: The Tigers won both games of a double-header with the Browns. Fred Hutchinson won the first game, 6–2. Dizzy Trout, in his first start since 1948, won the second game, 2–1. Trout gave up only five hits and also drove in the winning run with a single in the second inning.
- May 30: The Tigers split a double-header with the Indians before a crowd of 55,537 at Briggs Stadium. The Indians won the first game, 4–0, behind the shutout pitching of Bob Lemon. The Tigers won the second game, 5–2, behind the seven-hit pitching of Hal Newhouser. The Tigers closed the month with a 22–12 record, three games behind the Yankees.

=== June ===
- June 2: The Tigers won both games of a double-header against the Athletics in Philadelphia. The Tigers won the first game, 3–2, and the second game, 16–5. George Kell hit for the cycle in the second game. Vic Wertz had seven RBIs and a home run, and Hoot Evers hit a home run in the first game. The Tigers' 16 runs and 21 hits in the second game were season highs.
- June 3: The Tigers beat the A's, 6–1, before a crowd of 2,714 in Philadelphia. Hal Newhouser won his fourth straight game.
- June 4: The Tigers defeated the Senators, 3–0, in Washington. Art Houtemann pitched a six-hit shutout after announcing his engagement to former diving champion and aquacade performer Shelagh Kelly.
- June 5: The Tigers defeated that Senators, 7–4. Dizzy Trout got the win. Hoot Evers hit a home run and a triple with the bases loaded.
- June 6: The Tigers defeated the Senators, 11–9, for their seventh consecutive victory. Fred Hutchinson won his sixth game of the season. With the Yankees losing to Cleveland, the Tigers moved back into first place. George Kell had two hits and moved into the league lead with a .388 batting average.
- June 7: The Tigers lost to the Yankees, 5–4, at Yankee Stadium. The Yankees retook first place with the win. Hal Newhouser was the losing pitcher.
- June 8: The Tigers lost to the Yankees, 11–4, before a Thursday crowd of 62,264 at Yankee Stadium. The Yankees scored seven runs off Art Houtteman in the sixth inning. Phil Rizzuto's record of 238 errorless chances ended when he fumbled a ground ball in the fifth inning.
- June 9: The Tigers avoided a sweep in New York, defeating the Yankees, 13–7. The Tigers scored eight runs in the sixth inning. Relief pitcher Paul Calvert got the win. Calvert hit Yankee pitcher Bob Porterfield in the head with a pitch in the seventh inning. Porterfield was unconscious for more than 20 minutes before being taken to the hospital.
- June 10: The Tigers retook first place after defeating the Boston Red Sox by an 18–8 score. Vic Wertz and Hoot Evers hit consecutive home runs. The Tigers scored seven runs in the fourth inning and eight runs in the ninth inning.
- June 11: The Tigers swept a double-header from the Red Sox in Boston. They won the first game, 6–2, as Hal Newhouser pitched a strong game. They won the second game, 9–6, as Vic Wertz hit a three-run home run in the 14th inning. The Tigers concluded their Easter road trip with 10 wins and two losses
- June 12: In an exhibition, charity game at Briggs Stadium, the Tigers played to a 9–9 tie with the Cincinnati Reds.
- June 13: The Tigers defeated the Philadelphia Athletics, 6–5, before a Tuesday night crowd of 31,894 at Briggs Stadium. Hoot Evers hit a game-winning home run in the 10th inning.
- June 14: The Tigers lost to the A's, 8–2.
- June 15: The Tigers beat the A's‚ 7–3‚ for their 8th win in 9 meetings with the A's. Hoot Evers had his 19-game hit streak stopped but George Kell ran his to 15 games. Fred Hutchinson got the win.
- June 16: Pitching before a crowd of 54‚086‚ Hal Newhouser beat the Red Sox for the second time in six days‚ winning 4–1. He struck out eight, including Johnny Pesky four times. Detroit maintained its 1 1/2-game lead over the Yankees.
- June 17: The Tigers defeated the Red Sox, 2–1. Ted Gray pitched a complete game for the win. The Tigers remained in first place, 2 1/2 games ahead of the Yankees.
- June 18: The Tigers defeated the Red Sox, 10–2, before a Sunday crowd of 36,714 at Briggs Stadium. Art Houtteman got the win, and George Kell, Hoot Evers, and Aaron Robinson hit home runs.
- June 20: The Tigers lost to the Washington Senators, 4–2, at Brigg Stadium. Conrado Marrero held the Tigers to three hits.
- June 21: The Tigers lost the Senators, 12–4. Sandy Consuegra held the Tigers to five hits.
- June 22: The Tigers again lost to the Senators, 5–2, to complete a three-game sweep. Bob Kuzava, a Wyandotte native, held the Tigers to six hits.
- June 23: The Tigers beat the Yankees, 10–9, in front of 51,400 fans in Detroit. A then-MLB record eleven home runs accounted for all the runs. Detroit has four home runs in the 4th inning by Dizzy Trout‚ Jerry Priddy‚ Vic Wertz, and Hoot Evers. Trout's home run was the second grand slam of his career. Evers also hit an inside-the-park two-run home run to win the game in the 9th inning.
- June 24: Art Houtteman led the Tigers to a 4–1 win over the Yankees. Yogi Berra hit a solo home run for the Yankees' only score. The Tigers led the AL by three games.
- June 25: The Tigers split a Sunday double-header with the Yankees before a crowd of 55,628 at Briggs Stadium. The Tigers lost the opener, 8–2, but won the nightcap, 6–3. Hoot Evers hit a three-run home run in the second game. The attendance total of 139,693 for the weekend series against the Yankees set an attendance record in Detroit.
- June 26: The Tigers defeated the Chicago White Sox, 6–4, in Detroit. Charlie Keller hit a two-run, pinch-hit triple in the eighth inning. The victory extended the Tigers' lead in the AL to 3 1/2 games.
- June 27: The Tigers defeated the White Sox, 9–3, before a Tuesday crowd of 40,383 at Briggs Stadium. Ted Gray got his ninth win of the season, and Johnny Lipon hit a bases-loaded triple and then scored when a relay throw went into the dugout. The Tigers expanded their lead in the AL to 4 1/2 games.
- June 28: The Tigers beat the White Sox, 6–2. Art Houtteman became the first pitcher to win 10 games in 1950. Hoot Evers and Don Kolloway hit home runs in support of Houtteman.
- June 29: The Tigers lost to the White Sox, 7–3. Bob Cain pitched a complete game for Chicago and also had an RBI and a double.
- June 30: The Tigers lost to the Cleveland Indians, 11–3, before a Friday crowd of 50,882 in Cleveland. The Indians scored nine times in the first two innings against Hal Newhouser.

=== July ===
- July 2: The Tigers split a doubleheader with the Indians. Bob Feller got his 200th win‚ 5–3‚ in the second game. Detroit won the opener‚ 8–5.
- July 11: George Kell and Hoot Evers started for the American League in the 1950 Major League Baseball All-Star Game. Kell went hitless in six at bats, but had an RBI on a sacrifice fly. Detroit pitcher Art Houtteman gave up a home run to Ralph Kiner in the bottom of the ninth inning to send the game to extra innings. Another Detroit pitcher Ted Gray was the losing pitcher after giving up a home run to Red Schoendienst in the bottom of 14th inning.
- July 19: The Tigers beat the Red Sox, 9–5, at Fenway Park. In the 9th inning, umpire called time just before a Red Sox pinch hitter tripled to center field. The at bat was played over, and results in a groundout.
- July 23: The Tigers beat the Yankees, 6–5, to maintain their hold on first place. Detroit pitcher Saul Rogovin hit a grand slam off Eddie Lopat.

=== August ===
- August 3: The Tigers bought Hank Borowy from the Pirates. Detroit fans recall Borowy as the pitcher who pitched for the Cubs against the Tigers in four games of the 1945 World Series, winning two and losing two.
- August 14: The Tigers lost to the Indians, 3–2, in 10 innings, before 60,120 fans at Cleveland Stadium. Detroit's lead in the AL was reduced to 2 1/2 games. Al Rosen tied the game in the ninth with a two-out home run. Right fielder Bob Kennedy started a triple play from the outfield.
- August 30: The Tigers dropped out of first place for the first time since June 10 when they split a pair with the Senators, losing 3–2 in 11 innings, then taking the second game, 10–8.

=== September ===
- September 2: The Tigers defeated the Chicago White Sox, 8–2, in Detroit. Vic Wertz hit a three-run home run in the first inning, and Hal Newhouser won his 12th game of the year.
- September 3: The Tigers defeated the White Sox, 4–2, before a Sunday crowd of 25,589 at Briggs Stadium. Fred Hutchinson won his 15th game and held the Sox scoreless until Eddie Robinson hit a home run with two outs in the ninth inning.
- September 4: The Tigers split a double-header with the St. Louis Browns before a Labor Day crowd of 37,515 at Briggs Stadium. They won the opener, 4–2, but lost, 4–2, in the second game.
- September 5: The Tigers defeated the Browns, 7–4. Hoot Evers put the Tigers in the lead in the seventh inning with a bases-loaded single.
- September 6: The Tigers defeated the Cleveland Indians, 5–3, before a crowd of 52,555 in Detroit. Hal Newhouser got the win. With the win, the Tigers moved to within 1/2 game of first place.
- September 7: Hoot Evers hit for the cycle, added another triple, and batted in six runs in a 13–13, ten-inning tie with Cleveland. The game, ended because of darkness, left Detroit in first place by .002 over the Yankees. Al Rosen and Bob Feller both hit early two-run home runs as the Indians blew three leads in the game.
- September 8: The Tigers defeated the Chicago White Sox, 3–2, in Detroit.
- September 9: The Tigers and White Sox finished a game that started in April. The game was originally scheduled as the second game of a doubleheader, but was halted by darkness after nin3 innings with the scored tied 7–7. Art Houtteman finally ended it with a 1–0, 12-inning win. Hoot Evers tripled and scored on a single by Johnny Groth. The Tigers lost the second game, 5–4, cutting their lead to a half game over New York and a game ahead of Boston.
- September 10: The Tigers split a Sunday double-header with the Chicago White Sox. The Tigers defeated the Sox in the opener, 1–0, behind 12 innings of shutout pitching by Hal Newhouser.
- September 11: The Tigers were idle, and the Yankees moved into first with a doubleheader sweep over the Senators, 5–1 and 6–2.
- September 12: The Tigers beat the Senators, 3–2 in Detroit, and the Yankees blew a six-run lead as Cleveland scored four in the ninth inning to win, 8–7. The Tigers moved ahead of the Yankees by a half game and a full game ahead of Boston.
- September 13: The Tigers beat the Senators, 6–1, and the Yankees beat the Indians, 10–3. The Tigers remained a half game ahead of the Yankees.
- September 14: With the Tigers leading the AL by a half game, the Tigers and Yankees began a three-game series at Briggs Stadium. The Yankees won the opener, 7–5, as Vic Raschi got his 20th win. Detroit scored two runs in the 1st inning, but the Yankees came back as Joe DiMaggio and Hank Bauer both hit home runs. The Yankees took over first place by a half game.
- September 15: The Tigers won the second game of the three-game series in Detroit. On a Friday night, Johnny Mize hit three home runs, but the Tigers won, 9–7. The Tigers moved back into first place by a half game.
- September 16: The Yankees beat the Tigers, 8–1, before a crowd of 56,548. Rookie Whitey Ford held the Tigers to six hits. Joe DiMaggio hit his 30th home run, and the Yankees scored seven runs in the ninth inning. The Yankees moved ahead of the Tigers by a half game.
- September 17–18: The Tigers were swept in a two-game series with the Red Sox in Detroit, both games by identical 3–2 scores.
- September 19–21: The Tigers swept a three-game series against the A's in Detroit.
- September 22: The Tigers were swept in a doubleheader against the Indians, in Cleveland. In the first game, Detroit first baseman Don Kolloway hit a two-run home run in the top of the 9th inning off Bob Feller to tie the game at 3–3. In the bottom of the inning, Joe Gordon hit a walk-off home run off Hal Newhouser. The loss moved the Tigers back into second place. The Tigers lost the second game, 10–2. Cleveland was the only team that held a winning record over Detroit in 1950 (13–9).
- September 24: The Tigers lost to the Indians, 2–1. In Cleveland, heavy smoke from a Canadian forest fire forced the Indians to put on the lights in the Sunday afternoon game. Bob Lemon hit a home run in the 4th inning, and Johnny Lipon tied it with a home run. Lemon opened the 10th with a triple, and two intentional walks followed. With the bases loaded and one out, Detroit catcher Aaron Robinson thought he could complete a double play by stepping on the plate. Because of the haze, he did not see first baseman Don Kolloway remove the force after fielding the ball. Robinson's mental lapse cost Detroit the game.
- September 26–28: The Tigers won three out of four games against the Browns, and relief pitcher Hal White got the win in all three games.
- September 29: The Tigers were eliminated from the pennant race with a 12–2 loss to the Cleveland Indians. Bob Lemon was the winning pitcher for the Indians.
- September 30: The Tigers defeated the Indians, 3–1, to clinch second place in the American League. Hal Newhouser was the winning pitcher. George Kell had a two-run double in the eighth inning.

=== October ===
- October 1: In the final game of the season, the Tigers lost to the Indians, 7–5, at Briggs Stadium in Detroit. George Kell had two hits to boost his batting average to .342. Hamtramck native Steve Gromek was the winning pitcher for Cleveland. The Tigers finished second in the American League, three games behind the Yankees.
- October 19: Three Tigers were named by the United Press to the All-American League baseball team. The Detroit honorees were George Kell, Hoot Evers, and Vic Wertz. Kell was selected on 22 of the 24 first-place ballots. Evers and Wertz were named on 16 ballots.
- October 24: Red Rolfe received nine votes in polling by the United Press for the American League Manager of the Year award. Casey Stengel of the Yankees received 10 votes and received the award.
- October 25: Pitcher Art Houtteman arrived at Camp Pickett in Virginia to begin his Army training after being drafted.
- October 26: Phil Rizzuto won the American League Most Valuable Player award with 284 points. Five Tigers finished among the leaders: George Kell fourth (127 points); Vic Wertz 10th (50 points); Hoot Evers 11th (38 points); Dizzy Trout 12th (21 points); and Jerry Priddy 17th (11 points).

== Awards and honors ==
=== American League Most Valuable Player voting ===
- George Kell: fourth (127 points)
- Vic Wertz: 10th (50 points)
- Hoot Evers: 11th (38 points)
- Dizzy Trout: 12th (21 points)
- Jerry Priddy: 17th (11 points)

=== 1950 Major League Baseball All-Star Game ===
- George Kell, starter, third base
- Hoot Evers: starter, outfield
- Ted Gray, reserve (losing pitcher in 13th inning)
- Art Houtteman, reserve

=== League leaders ===
- Hoot Evers: MLB leader in times caught stealing (9)
- Hoot Evers: AL leader in triples (11)
- Hoot Evers: AL leader in fielding percentage by an outfielder (.997)
- Fred Hutchinson: AL leader in shutouts (4)
- Fred Hutchinson: AL leader in walks per 9 innings pitched (1.86)
- Fred Hutchinson: AL leader in strikeout to walk ratio (1.48)
- Fred Hutchinson: AL leader in home runs allowed (29)
- George Kell: MLB leader in hits (218)
- George Kell: MLB leader in doubles (56)
- George Kell: AL leader in runs created (124)
- George Kell: AL leader in at bats (641)
- Johnny Lipon: AL leader in assists (483) and double plays (126) by a shortstop
- Jerry Priddy: AL leader in assists (542) and double plays (150) by a second baseman

=== Players ranking among top 100 of all time at position ===
The following members of the 1950 Detroit Tigers are among the Top 100 of all time at their positions, as ranked by The New Bill James Historical Baseball Abstract in 2001:

- Jerry Priddy: 73rd best second baseman of all time
- George Kell: 30th best third baseman of all time
- Hoot Evers: 100th best left fielder of all time
- Vic Wertz: 61st best right fielder of all time
- Hal Newhouser: 36th best pitcher of all time
- Virgil Trucks: 61st best pitcher of all time

== Farm system ==
Level	Team	League	Manager
AAA	Toledo Mud Hens	American Association	Eddie Mayo
AA	Little Rock Travelers	Southern Association	Jack Saltzgaver
A	Flint Arrows	Central League	Gene Desautels
A	Williamsport Tigers	Eastern League	Jack Tighe
B	Durham Bulls	Carolina League	Ace Parker
C	Butler Tigers	Middle Atlantic League	Marv Olson
D	Thomasville Tigers	Georgia–Florida League	Bob Benish
D	Richmond Tigers	Ohio–Indiana League	Ralph DiLullo and Ken Holtcamp
D	Jamestown Falcons	PONY League	Bob Shawkey

LEAGUE CHAMPIONS: Butler

== See also ==
- 1950 in Michigan
