= Portsmouth A's =

- 1948–1950; Portsmouth, Ohio

Minor league affiliations
- Class: Class D (1948–1950)
- League: Ohio-Indiana League (1948–1950)

Major league affiliations
- Team: Philadelphia Athletics (1948–1950)

Minor league titles
- League titles (0): None
- Conference titles (1): 1949
- Wild card berths (1): 1948

Team data
- Name: Portsmouth A's (1948–1950)
- Ballpark: Riverside Park/Branch Rickey Park (1948–1950)

The Portsmouth A's were a minor league baseball team based in Portsmouth, Ohio. From 1948 to 1950, the A's played as exclusively as members of the Class D level Ohio-Indiana League and were a minor league affiliate of the Philadelphia Athletics. The Portsmouth A's hosted minor league home games at Riverside Park, known today as Branch Rickey Park. The A's won the 1949 league pennant.

== History ==
The Portsmouth A's were immediately preceded by the Portsmouth Red Birds, who played as members of the Middle Atlantic League from 1937 to 1940 as an affiliate of the St. Louis Cardinals.

In 1948, the Portsmouth A's were formed, serving as a minor league affiliate of the Philadelphia Athletics. Portsmouth became members of the eight–team Class D level Ohio–Indiana League. Portsmouth joined the Lima Terriers, Marion Cubs, Muncie Reds, Newark Yankees, Richmond Braves, Springfield Giants and Zanesville Dodgers in beginning league play on May 15, 1948.

In their first season of play, Portsmouth A's placed second in the Ohio–Indiana League regular season standings. The A's ended the 1948 season with a record of 82–58, as George Staller served as manager. Portsmouth finished a mere 0.5 game behind the first place Zanesville Dodgers in the final standings. In the playoffs, the Muncie Packers swept Portsmouth 4 games to 0.

The 1949 Portsmouth A's won the Ohio–Indiana League pennant before losing in the playoffs. Playing under manager Homer Cox, Portsmouth placed first in the regular season standings with an 81–58 record. Portsmouth finished 4.5 games ahead of the second place Springfield Giants. In the first round of playoffs, the Marion Red Sox defeated the A's 3 games to 1.

In their final season, the Portsmouth A's did not qualify for the 1950 playoffs to defend their championship. The Portsmouth A's ended their final Ohio–Indiana League season with a 46–89 record to place seventh. Walter Van Grofski served as manager, as Portsmouth finished 42.5 games behind the first place Marion Red Sox. The A's scored 568 total runs, last in the league.

In 1951, the Portsmouth A's did not return to play, as the Ohio–Indiana League reduced from eight teams to six teams. Portsmouth was without minor league baseball until the 1993 Portsmouth Explorers began a three–season tenure as members of the Frontier League.

== The ballpark ==
The Portsmouth A's hosted minor league home games at Riverside Park. The ballpark was renamed "Branch Rickey Park" in 1950. The ballpark was constructed in 1935 and is still in use today, as home to the Shawnee State Bears collegiate team. The location is 25 Mary Ann Street.

== Timeline ==
Year(s)	# Yrs.	Team	Level	League	Affiliate	Ballpark
1948–1950	3	Portsmouth A's	Class D	Ohio-Indiana League	Philadelphia Athletics	Riverside Park

== Year–by–year records ==
Year	Record	Finish	Manager	Attend	Playoffs
1948	82–58	2nd	George Staller	73,533	Lost 1st round
1949	81–48	1st	Homer Cox	61,106	Won league pennant Lost 1st round
1950	46–89	7th	Walter Van Grofski	21,685	Did not qualify

== Notable alumni ==
- Hilly Flitcraft (1948)
- Dutch Romberger (1948–1949)
- George Staller (1948, MGR)
- Portsmouth A's players
