= Marion Senators =

- 1915; Marion, Ohio

Minor league affiliations
- Class: Class D (1915)
- League: Buckeye League (1915)

Major league affiliations
- Team: None

Minor league titles
- League titles (0): None

Team data
- Name: Marion Senators (1915)
- Ballpark: Lincoln Park (1915)

The Marion Senators were a Minor league baseball team based in Marion, Ohio and Marion County, Ohio. In 1915, the Senators played briefly as members of the short–lived Buckeye League, hosting minor league home games at Lincoln Park. The Senators folded in June 1915 and the Buckeye League folded in July 1915.

== History ==
The Senators were preceded in minor league baseball by the 1912 Marion Diggers, who ended a five–season tenure as members of the Ohio State League.

In 1915, the Marion Senators became charter members of the Class D level Buckeye League, before folding during the season. The 1915 Buckeye League formed as six–team league and began play on May 19, 1915. The Akron Rubbermen, Canton Giants, Findlay Finns, Lima Boosters and Newark New Socks joined Marion in league play.

On Friday, May 21, 1915, the Senators hosted their home opener at Lincoln Park. A parade was held before the contest against Newark, with 15 automobiles following "Baker's Band." Orndorf was named as the starting pitcher for Marion. It was noted in the Marion Daily Star that Tuesday games were "Ladies' Day" games with "the fairer sex to be admitted free."

The Senators' season was short–lived. On June 11, 1915, both the Marion Senators and Canton Giants teams disbanded, with the Senators having compiled a 10–5 record at the time the team folded. The Buckeye League, with four remaining teams, permanently disbanded on July 5, 1915. The league folding corresponded to World War I efforts that affected many minor leagues.

The Lima Boosters (25–18) were in first place when the Buckeye League folded on July 5, 1915. Lima was followed by the Findlay Finns (22–19), Akron Rubbermen (22–21) and Newark New Socks (14–24) in the final standings. The Marion Senators had a record of 10–5 and the Canton Giants were 5–11 when they both folded on June 11, 1915.

The Buckeye League never played again as a minor league after folding in 1915. Marion next hosted minor league baseball in 1937, when the Marion Presidents played a partial season as members of the Ohio State League.

== The ballpark ==
The Marion Senators hosted 1915 minor league home games at Lincoln Park. The Senators were the first Marion minor league team to play in Lincoln Park and the ballpark would host the remaining Marion minor league teams through 1951. Today, Lincoln Park is still in use as a public park, with numerous amenities on 89 acres, including 12 ball fields. The location today is 897 North Prospect Street.

== Year–by–year record ==
Year	Record	Finish	Manager	Playoffs/notes
1915	10–5	NA	Buzz Wetzel	Team Folded June 11; League folded July 5

== Notable alumni ==
- Luther Bonin (1915)
- Buzz Wetzel (1915, MGR)
- Marion Senators players
