= Lincoln Park (Marion, Ohio) =

Baseball stadium in Marion, Ohio

Coordinates: 40°36′21″N 83°08′00″W

Lincoln Park is located in Marion, Ohio. It served as the home of the Marion Red Sox, a Boston Red Sox minor league affiliate, from 1949 to 1951. It is still is use today by amateur baseball teams.

The ballpark previously served as home to Marion minor league teams beginning in 1915. The 1915 Marion Senators of the Class D level Buckeye League, 1937 Marion Presidents, 1944 Marion Diggers and 1944 to 1947 Marion Cardinals (St. Louis Cardinals affiliate), all members of the Class D level Ohio State League played at the ballpark. The Marion Cubs (Chicago Cubs affiliate) in 1948 preceded the Marion Red Sox as members of the Class D level Ohio-Indiana League and hosted games at Lincoln Park.

Lincoln Park was also the site of one NFL game in 1922. On October 8 of that year, the Oorang Indians coached by Jim Thorpe, played the only home game of their short two year existence defeated the Columbus Panhandles by the score of 20–6.
