= Springfield Giants (Ohio) =

- 1944–1951; Springfield, Ohio

Minor league affiliations
- Class: Class D (1944–1951)
- League: Ohio State League (1944–1947); Ohio–Indiana League (1948–1951)

Major league affiliations
- Team: New York Giants (1944–1951)

Minor league titles
- League titles (0): None
- Conference titles (2): 1944; 1946
- Wild card berths (6): 1945; 1947; 1948; 1949; 1950; 1951

Team data
- Name: Springfield Giants (1944–1951)
- Ballpark: Municipal Stadium (1944–1951)

The Springfield Giants were a minor league baseball team based in Springfield, Ohio. The "Giants" were an affiliate of the New York Giants and played as members of the Class D level Ohio State League from 1944 and 1947, before the league changed names in 1948. The Giants continued play as members of the Class D level Ohio–Indiana League from 1948 to 1951. Hosting minor league home games at Municipal Stadium, the Springfield Giants won the 1944 and 1946 league pennants and made eight playoff appearances, qualifying for the postseason in each season of play.

== History ==
=== Ohio State League 1944 to 1947 ===
The 1944 Springfield Giants were immediately preceded in minor league play by the 1942 Springfield Cardinals. In their final season, the Cardinals were managed by Baseball Hall of Fame member Walter Alston, as the team played a final season as members of the Class C level Middle Atlantic League, before the league folded following the 1942 season during World War II.

Springfield, Ohio resumed minor league baseball play in 1944, when the "Giants" became members of the six–team Class D level Ohio State League, which was resumed play during World War II. The Lima Red Birds, Marion Diggers, Middletown Red Sox, Newark Moundsmen, Richmond Roses and Zanesville Dodgers joined Springfield in beginning league play on May 2, 1944.

In 1944, the team vice president was Holmes Collins, the auditor was O.R. Shriver and the director was Frank J. Sturm.

The Springfield Giants were a minor league affiliate of the New York Giants, adopting the team's nickname. In their first season of play, the Giants won the Ohio State League pennant. The Giants ended the Ohio State League season with a record of 76–54, placing first in the regular season standings, finishing 4.5 games ahead of the second place Newark Moundsmen, with Earl Wolgamot serving as manager. In the playoffs, Springfield lost in the first round to the Middletown Red Sox, who defeated the Giants four games to two.

The Giants qualified for the 1945 Ohio State League playoffs. With a record of 64–75, Springfield placed fourth in the six–team league, playing the season under returning manager Earl Wolgamot and finishing 25.0 games behind the first place Middletown Rockets. In the playoffs, Springfield lost in the first round, as the Middletown Rockets defeated the Giants four games to two. The Giants' Tony Bolick led the Ohio State with 109 RBI.

Springfield won the 1946 Ohio State League pennant, as the league expanded from six teams to eight teams. The Giants finished the regular season with a record of 82–57 to place first in the Ohio State League, finishing 3.5 games ahead of the second place Zanesville Dodgers. Don Ramsay served as manager. In the playoffs, Springfield defeated the Newark Moundsmen four games to two and advanced. In the finals, the Giants were defeated by the Zanesville Dodgers four games to two. Wayne Reside, who was acquired from Lima during the season, led the Ohio State League with both 21 home runs and 118 RBI.

Continuing play in the 1947 Ohio State League, Springfield placed fourth and qualified for the playoffs. The Giants ended the 1947 regular season with a record of 73–65, ending the season 15.5 games behind the first place Zanesville Dodgers. Don Ramsay returned as manager. In the first round of the playoffs, the Zanesville Dodgers defeated the Giants four games to two.

=== Ohio–Indiana League 1948 to 1951 ===
In 1948, the Ohio State League expanded beyond the state of Ohio and changed names to become the Class D level Ohio–Indiana League. The Muncie Reds joined seven returning Ohio State League teams in beginning league play on May 2, 1948.

The 1948 Springfield Giants continued as a minor league affiliate of the New York Giants, playing in the newly named league. Ending the 1948 Ohio–Indiana League season in fourth place, Springfield qualified for the playoffs of the eight–team league. Springfield had a record of 66–74, playing the season under managers Robert Roth and Rufus Jackson, finishing 16.5 games behind the first place Zanesville Dodgers in the regular season final standings. In the playoffs, eventual champion Zanesville swept Springfield in four games in their first round series.

In 1949, Springfield was runner–up in the Ohio–Indiana League regular season standings. The Giants placed second in the regular season standings, ending the season with a record of 77–63, playing the season under manager Tony Ravish. The Giants finished 4.5 games behind the first place Portsmouth A's. The Muncie Reds defeated Springfield four games to one in the first round of the playoffs.

The Springfield Giants again qualified for the Ohio-Indiana League playoffs in 1950. Managed by Andy Gilbert, the Giants ended the 1950 regular season with a record of 72–64, placing fourth in the standings and ending the season 17.0 games behind the pennant winning Marion Red Sox. In the playoffs, the Marion Red Sox defeated Springfield three games to one in the first round. Player/manager Andy Gilbert of Springfield won the league batting title, hitting .388.

In its final season of play, the 1951 Ohio–Indiana League compacted to become a five–team league to begin the season. The Newark Yankees won the first–half title in a split–season schedule, with the first–half season schedule ending on June 18, 1951. Newark then folded on July 17, 1951, leaving four remaining teams, Springfield included, completing the second half of the season. With Newark excluded, Springfield finished a distant second in the final regular season standings. At the conclusion of the season, the Giants finished 30.0 games behind the Marion Red Sox in the overall standings with a 53–74 record, playing the season under returning manager Andy Gilbert. In a playoff series, the Marion Red Sox swept Springfield four games to none in the final games of the league. The Ohio–Indiana League permanently folded following the completion of the 1951 season.

Springfield, Ohio has not hosted another minor league team. In 2014, the Springfield-based Champion City Kings began play in the amateur Prospect League, a summer collegiate baseball league.

== The ballpark ==
The Springfield Giants teams hosted home minor league home games at Municipal Stadium. The original Municipal Stadium was built in 1939 as a WPA project. It was demolished in 2000, with a new grandstand and refurbished field built at the site. Today, the ballpark is known as Carleton Davidson Stadium and plays host to the Champion City Kings of the Prospect league and the Wittenberg University baseball team. Carleton Davidson Stadium is located at 1101 Mitchell Boulevard.

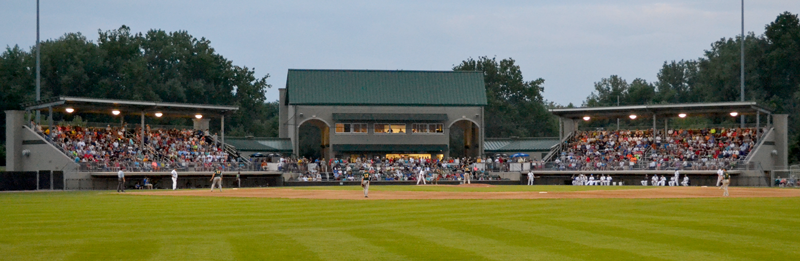
(2017) Carlton Davidson Stadium

== Timeline ==
Year(s)	# Yrs.	Team	Level	League	Affiliate	Ballpark
1944–1947	4	Springfield Giants	Class D	Ohio State League	New York Giants	Municipal Stadium
1948–1951	4	Springfield Giants	Class D	Ohio–Indiana League	New York Giants	Municipal Stadium

== Year–by–year records ==
Year	Record	Finish	Manager	Attend	Playoffs / notes
1944	76–64	1st	Earl Wolgamot	NA	Won league pennant Lost in 1st round
1945	64–75	4th	Earl Wolgamot	46,583	Lost in 1st round
1946	82–57	1st	Don Ramsay	NA	Won league pennant Lost in finals
1947	73–65	4th	Don Ramsay	72,462	Lost in 1st round
1948	65–74	4th	Robert Roth / Rufus Jackson	67,558	Lost in 1st round
1949	77–63	2nd	Tony Ravish	67,568	Lost in 1st round
1950	80–58	3rd	Andy Gilbert	37,619	Lost in 1st round
1951	61–67	2nd	Andy Gilbert	45,862	Lost in Final

== Notable alumni ==
- Andy Gilbert (1950–1951, MGR)
- Jim Goodwin (1944)
- Bobby Hoffman (1944)
- Earl Wolgamot (1944, MGR)
- Eddie Bressoud (1950)
- Ham Schulte (1950)
- Dom Zanni (1951)
- Springfield Giants players
