= Zanesville Indians =

- 1949–1950; Zanesville, Ohio

Minor league affiliations
- Previous classes: Class D (1944–1950); Class C (1933–1937, 1941–1942)
- League: Ohio–Indiana League (1949–1950)
- Previous leagues: Ohio State League (1944–1947); Middle Atlantic League (1933–1937, 1941–1942)

Major league affiliations
- Previous teams: Cleveland Indians (1949–1950); Brooklyn Dodgers (1944–1948); Chicago Cubs (1941–1942); Boston Bees (1937); Cleveland Indians (1933–1936)

Minor league titles
- League titles: None

Team data
- Previous names: Zanesville Indians (1949–1950); Zanesville Dodgers (1944–1948); Zanesville Cubs (1941–1942); Zanesville Greys (1933–1937)
- Previous parks: Gant Municipal Stadium (1933–1937, 1941–1942, 1944–1950)

The Zanesville Indians (a.k.a. Zanesville Dodgers, Zanesville Cubs and Zanesville Greys) were a Minor League Baseball Team located in Zanesville, Ohio. They played in the Ohio State League and Ohio–Indiana League from 1944 to 1950. The team had affiliation deals with the Brooklyn Dodgers and Cleveland Indians.

Prior to World War II they played in the Middle Atlantic League from 1933 to 1942.
