= Henry Welsch =

American football and baseball player and coach

Biographical details
- Born: July 3, 1921; Saint Paul, Minnesota, U.S.
- Died: September 27, 1996 (aged 75); Saint Paul, Minnesota, U.S.

Playing career

Baseball
- 1945: St. Paul Saints
- 1945: Zanesville Dodgers
- 1946: St. Cloud Rox

Coaching career (HC unless noted)

Football
- 1944: Saint John's (MN)

Baseball
- 1946: Saint John's (MN)

Head coaching record
- Overall: 1–0–1 (football); 7–4 (baseball)

Henry John "Bruts" Welsch (July 3, 1921 – September 27, 1996) was an American football and baseball player and coach. He served as the head football (1944) and head baseball (1946) coach at Saint John's University in Collegeville, Minnesota.

== Head coaching record ==
=== Football ===
Year	Team	Overall	Conference	Standing	Bowl/playoffs
Saint John's Johnnies (Minnesota Intercollegiate Athletic Conference) (1944)
1944	Saint John's	1–0–1	NA	NA	
Saint John's:		1–0–1	0–0		
Total:		1–0–1			
