= Van Wert Buckeyes =

- 1908; Van Wert, Ohio

Minor league affiliations
- Class: Class D
- League: Ohio-Indiana League (1907); Indiana-Ohio League (1908)

Minor league titles
- League titles: None

The Van Wert Buckeyes were a minor league baseball club, based in Van Wert, Ohio, in 1907 and 1908. The team was a member of the Class D level Ohio-Indiana League in 1907 and Indiana-Ohio League 1908. In 1908, after a month of play, a long series of financial losses by each club in the league had caused the league and the team to disband.

== Team records ==
Year	Record	Finish	Manager	Playoffs
1907	16-27	6th	France / Al Hubbard	No playoffs held
1908	16-14	2nd	Louis Hunt	League folded on July 8, 1908
