= Indiana-Ohio League =

Indiana–Ohio League
- Classification: Class D (1908)
- Sport: Minor League Baseball
- First season: May 9, 1908
- Folded: June 18, 1908
- President: Frank Gamble (1908)
- No. of teams: 4
- Country: United States of America
- Most titles: 1 Huntington Miamis (1908)

The Indiana–Ohio League was a class D level baseball league that operated briefly in 1908. The league was started on May 9, 1908, with four teams. Three of the teams were based in Indiana, with one in Ohio. National Association status was granted to the league by Minor League Baseball on June 3, 1908.

However, a long series of financial losses by each club in the league caused its disbandment. The Richmond Amusement Company, which owned the Richmond Quakers, reported losses in excess of a thousand dollars. The league permanently folded on June 8, 1908.

== Cities represented ==
- Huntington, IN: Huntington Miamis (1908)
- Van Wert, OH: Van Wert Buckeyes (1908)
- Richmond, IN: Richmond Quakers (1908)
- Muncie, IN: Muncie Fruit Jars (1908)

== Standings & statistics ==
| Team | Record | Finish | GB | Manager |
|---|---|---|---|---|
| Huntington Miamis | 14–10 | .583 | – | Jack Smith |
| Van Wert Buckeyes | 15–14 | .517 | 1½ | Louis Hunt |
| Richmond Quakers | 13–15 | .464 | 3 | Clarence Jessup |
| Muncie Fruit Jars | 10–14 | .417 | 4 | J.F. "Dick" Baird / Wills |

Player statistics
| Player | Team | Stat | Tot | Player | Team | Stat | Tot |
|---|---|---|---|---|---|---|---|
| Dolly Gray | Van Wert | BA | .363 | Paul Howard | Van Wert | W | 7 |
| Dolly Gray | Van Wert | Runs | 19 | Ray Brown | Richmond | SO | 53 |
| Dolly Gray | Van Wert | Hits | 33 | Bill Prough | Huntington | ERA | 1.08 |
| Paddy Baumann | Richmond | HR | 5 | Fred Applegate | Huntington | Pct | .714; 5–2 |
| | | | | Ed Smith | Richmond | Pct | .714; 5–2 |
