= Connie O'Connor =

American basketball and baseball player

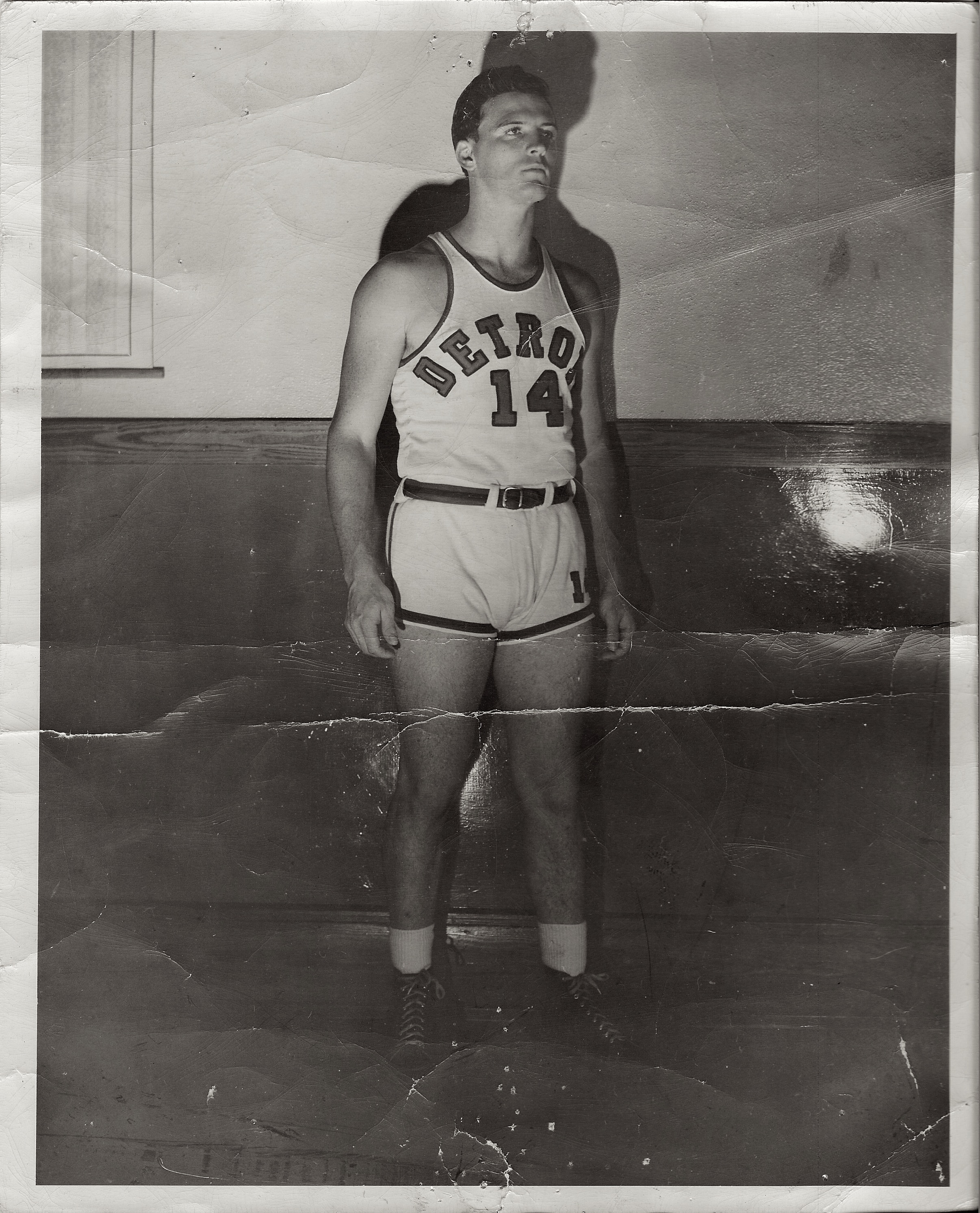

Personal information
- Born: February 21, 1923 Lennox, South Dakota, U.S.
- Died: January 15, 2014 (aged 90) Phoenix, Arizona, U.S.
- Listed height: 6 ft 1 in (1.85 m)
- Position: Forward

Career history
- 1946–1947: Detroit Gems

Conlon Cecil O'Connor (February 21, 1923 – January 15, 2014) was an American professional basketball player and minor league baseball player. He played in the National Basketball League for the Detroit Gems in 1946–47 and averaged 5.4 points per game. In baseball, he played for the Newark Moundsmen in the Ohio State League in 1944 and 1945.
