= Buckeye League =

- Classification: Class D (1915)
- Sport: Minor League Baseball
- First season: May 19, 1915
- Folded: July 5, 1915
- President: Al Lawson (1915)
- No. of teams: 6
- Country: United States of America
- Most titles: 1 Lima Boosters (1915)

The Buckeye League was a Class D level minor league baseball league that played briefly in the 1915 season. The six–team Buckeye League consisted of franchises based exclusively in Ohio. The Buckeye League played just a portion 1915 season before permanently folding. The Lima Boosters were the league champions in the shortened season.

== History ==
The Buckeye League began play in the 1915 season, formed as a Class D level league, with Al Lawson serving as league president.

The 1915 Buckeye League was a six–team league that began play on May 19, 1915. The league was formed with teams representing Akron Ohio (Akron Rubbermen), Canton, Ohio, (Canton Giants), Findlay, Ohio (Findlay Finns), Lima, Ohio (Lima Boosters), Marion, Ohio (Marion Senators) and Newark, Ohio (Newark New Socks). During the season, both the Marion and Canton franchises disbanded on June 11, 1915. The Buckeye League, with four remaining teams, permanently disbanded on July 5, 1915.

The Lima Boosters, with an average roster age of 34.8 were in first place when the Buckeye League folded on July 5, 1915. Lima finished with a record of 25–18, playing under manager Sandy Murray. Lima was followed by the Findlay Finns (22–19), Akron Rubbermen (22–21) and Newark New Socks (14–24) in the final standings. The Marion Senators had a record of 10–5 and the Canton Giants were 5–11 when they both folded on June 11, 1915.

The Buckeye League never played again as a minor league after folding in 1915.

== Buckeye League teams ==
| Team name | City represented | Ballpark | Year |
|---|---|---|---|
| Akron Rubbermen | Akron, Ohio | League Park I | 1915 |
| Canton Giants | Canton, Ohio | Meyer's Lake Park | 1915 |
| Findlay Finns | Findlay, Ohio | Athletic Park | 1915 |
| Lima Boosters | Lima, Ohio | San Felice Park; Murphy Street Park | 1915 |
| Marion Senators | Marion, Ohio | Lincoln Park | 1915 |
| Newark New Socks | Newark, Ohio | Wehrle Park | 1915 |

== Standings & statistics ==
=== 1915 Buckeye League ===
| Team standings | W | L | PCT | GB | Managers |
|---|---|---|---|---|---|
| Lima Boosters | 25 | 18 | .581 | – | Sandy Murray |
| Findlay Finns | 22 | 19 | .537 | 2 | Ollie Chapman |
| Akron Rubbermen | 22 | 21 | .512 | 3 | Al Newnham |
| Newark New Socks | 14 | 24 | .368 | 8½ | Erv Wratten |
| Marion Senators | 10 | 5 | .667 | NA | Buzz Wetzel |
| Canton Giants | 5 | 11 | .313 | NA | Bill Prout / Charles Skelley |

Marion and Canton disbanded June 11
Playoffs: None Scheduled.
The league disbanded July 5.

Player statistics
| Player | Team | Stat | Tot | Player | Team | Stat | Tot |
|---|---|---|---|---|---|---|---|
| Bill Mundy | Canton/Akron | BA | .355 | Red Hart | Findlay | W | 15 |
| Newt Jaekel | Akron | Runs | 35 | Bill Reynolds | Lima | SO | 110 |
| Sandy Murray | Lima | Hits | 52 | Red Hart | Findlay | Pct | .882; 15-2 |
| Don Costello | Findlay | HR | 4 | Ben Egan | Findlay | HR | 4 |
