= Paddy Baumann =

American baseball player (1885–1969)

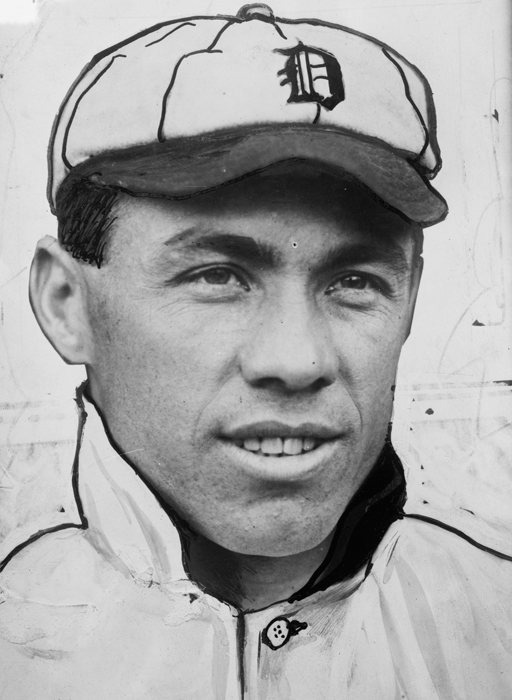
- Second baseman
- Born: December 20, 1885; Indianapolis, Indiana, U.S.
- Died: November 20, 1969 (aged 83); Indianapolis, Indiana, U.S.
- Batted: Right Threw: Right

MLB debut
- August 10, 1911, for the Detroit Tigers

Last MLB appearance
- September 8, 1917, for the New York Yankees

MLB statistics
- Batting average: .274
- Home runs: 4
- Runs batted in: 101
- Stats at Baseball Reference

Teams
- Detroit Tigers (1911–1914); New York Yankees (1915–1917)

Charles John "Paddy" Baumann (December 20, 1885 – November 20, 1969) was an American second baseman. His professional career lasted 21 years, including seven years in Major League Baseball (MLB) for the Detroit Tigers from 1911 to 1914 and the New York Yankees from 1915 to 1917.

== Early years ==
Baumann was born in Indianapolis in 1885.

== Professional career ==
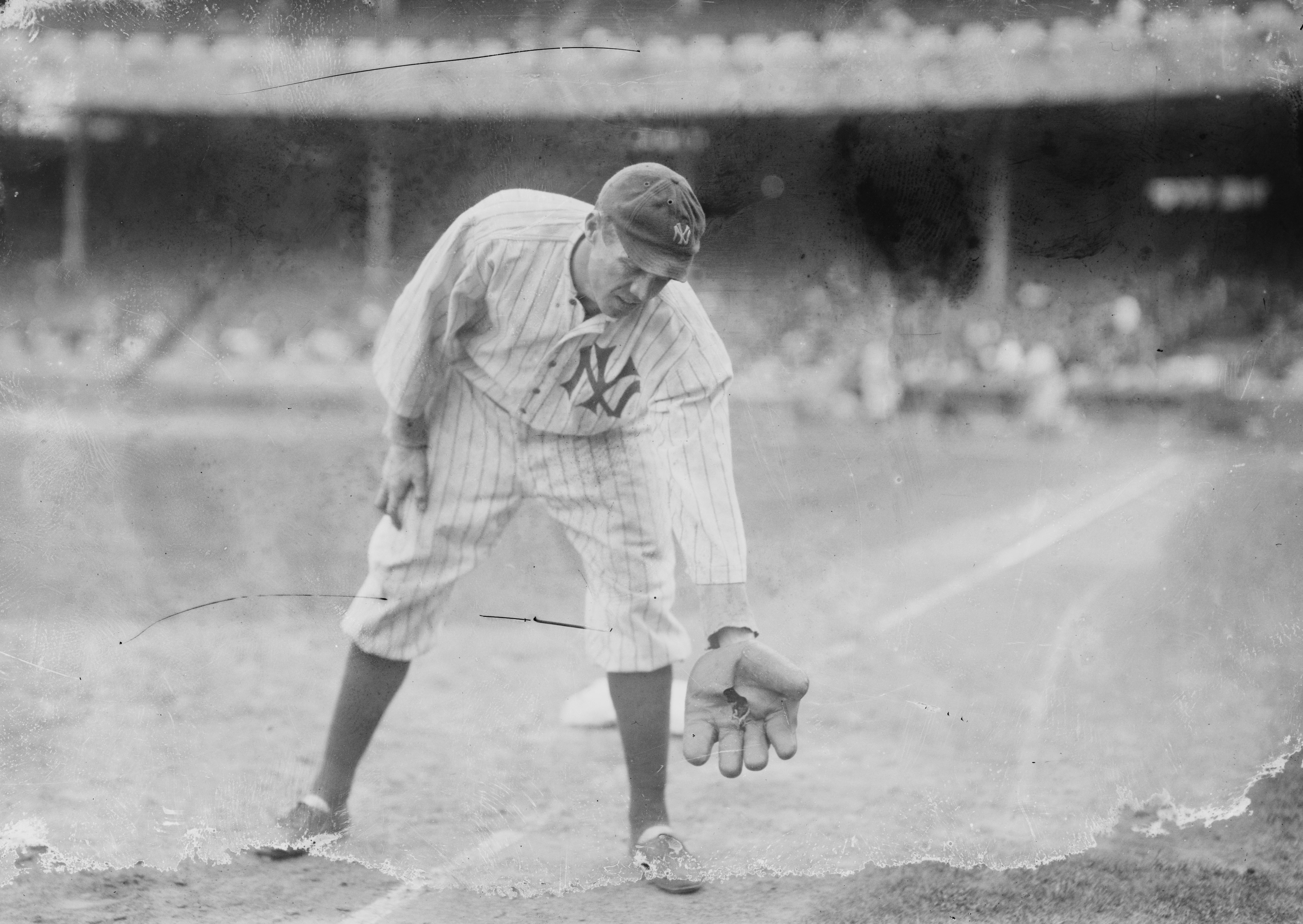
Baumann with the Yankees in 1915.

Baumann began playing professional baseball in 1908 playing for the Cedar Rapids Rabbits, Richmond Quakers, and Oskaloosa Quakers. He then played three years with the New Bedford Whalers from 1909 to 1911.

In June 1911, the Detroit Tigers purchased Bauman from New Bedford in exchange for $2,500 and first baseman Jack Ness. He made his major league debut on August 10, 1911, and appeared in 26 games for the Tigers during that season, including 21 games as a starter at second base. He compiled a .255 batting average with 11 RBIs. At second base, he tallied 58 putouts, 71 assists, six errors, and six double plays in 135 chances.

He returned to the Tigers in 1912 as a utility infielder, appearing in 16 games, including xix at third base, five at second base, and two in the outfield. At the plate, he hit .255 with seven RBIs in 42 at bats. He also played 54 games for the Providence Grays in 1912.

In 1913, he again split his season between Detroit (50 games) and Providence (75 games). In his time with the 1913 Tigers, he started 49 games at second base and compiled a career-high .298 batting average in 191 at batss.

Bauman spent the bulk of the 1914 season with Providence, appearing in 143 games with the Grays.

He joined the New York Yankees in 1915 and appeared in 204 games for the club over the next three seasons. He played a utility role for the Yankees, appearing in 70 games at second base, 46 games at third base, and 36 games in the outfield. He appeared in his last major league game on September 8, 1917. He compiled a career major-league batting average of .274 with four home runs, 101 RBI and a .350 on-base percentage in 299 major league games.

Bauman continued playing in the minor leagues for another decade, including stints with the Toledo Iron Men (1918, 1921), Jersey City Skeeters (1919–1920), Toronto Maple Leafs (1920), Tulsa Oilers (1922–1923), and Dallas Steers (1924–1928).

== Death ==
Baumann died in Indianapolis in 1969 at age 83. He was buried at Crown Hill Cemetery and Arboretum, Section 78, Lot 268.
