= Richmond Quakers =

- (1907–1908, 1917); Richmond, Indiana

Minor league affiliations
- Previous classes: Class D
- Previous leagues: Ohio-Indiana League (1907); Indiana-Ohio League (1908); Central League (1917)

The Richmond Quakers were a professional minor league baseball team based in Richmond, Indiana. The club was initially established in 1907 as team in the Class D level Ohio-Indiana League, and subsequently participated in 1908 in the Indiana-Ohio League. However, due to a string of financial losses incurred by every club in the league, it disbanded after just one month. The Richmond Amusement Company, which owned the Quakers, reported losses exceeding $1000. Despite this setback, the team expressed willingness to continue in the league if the other clubs agreed to stay, in hopes of recouping their losses in the future.

The Quakers continued to play independently, although several of their star players received offers from other teams. Star player Paddy Baumann, and several other key players, reportedly received offers from the Terre Haute Hottentots of the Central League. A second incarnation of the Richmond Quakers entered minor league play for one season in 1917 as a member of the Central League before permanently folding.

== Year-by-year records ==
Year	Record	Finish	Manager	Notes
1908	23-24	4th	Clarence Jessup	No playoffs held
1908	13-15	3rd	Clarence Jessup	League folded June 8
1917	46-70	6th	Bade Myers / Joe Evers; Larry Gilbert	No playoffs held
