= Clay Bryant =

American baseball player (1911–1999)

- Pitcher
- Born: November 16, 1911; Madison Heights, Virginia, U.S.
- Died: April 9, 1999 (aged 87); Boca Raton, Florida, U.S.
- Batted: Right Threw: Right

MLB debut
- April 19, 1935, for the Chicago Cubs

Last MLB appearance
- September 26, 1940, for the Chicago Cubs

Career statistics
- Win–loss record: 32–20
- Earned run average: 3.73
- Strikeouts: 272
- Stats at Baseball Reference

Teams
- Chicago Cubs (1935–1940)

Career highlights and awards
- NL strikeout leader (1938)

Claiborne Henry Bryant (November 16, 1911 – April 9, 1999) was an American pitcher in Major League Baseball who played from 1935 through 1940 for the Chicago Cubs. Listed at 6 ft 2 in (1.88 m), 195 lb (88 kg), Bryant batted and threw right handed. He was born in Madison Heights, Virginia.

== Career ==
Bryant spent parts of six seasons in the Minor Leagues before joining the Cubs in 1935. His most productive season came in 1938, when he won 19 games with a 3.10 earned run average and led the National League with 135 strikeouts, while pitching seven consecutive complete games, winning six of them in the first 25 days in September, to help the Cubs erase a nine-game deficit and capture an unlikely pennant.

Bryant went 32–20 with a 3.73 ERA in parts of six seasons for the Cubs. He began to experience elbow and shoulder pain, and this led to his retirement from baseball in 1940.

Bryant was an exceptionally good hitting pitcher in his six-year major league career, posting a .266 batting average (51-for-192), scoring 48 runs, with 5 home runs and 28 RBI.

Afterwards, Bryant was a longtime manager in the Brooklyn/Los Angeles Dodgers minor league system, and also served as a pitching coach for the Dodgers in 1961 and the Cleveland Indians in 1967 and 1974. He also was a roving pitching instructor in the Cleveland organization. Ned Garver said he learned the fundamentals of pitching from Bryant when he managed the Newark Moundsmen.

Bryant managed winter ball for the Leones del Caracas club of the Venezuelan League, guiding his team to the 1956–1957 pennant while advancing to the 1957 Caribbean Series.

== Personal life ==
Bryant's son, Chuck Bryant, played in the NFL. Clay died in 1999 in Boca Raton, Florida, at the age of 87.

== See also ==
- List of Major League Baseball annual strikeout leaders

Preceded by Early Wynn; Warren Spahn	Cleveland Indians pitching coach 1967; 1974	Succeeded by Jack Sanford; Harvey Haddix
