= Akron Champs =

- 1905–1920; (1905–1913, 1915, 1920); Akron, Ohio

Minor league affiliations
- Previous classes: Double-A (1920); Class D (1915); Class B (1912–1913); Class C (1905–1911)
- League: International League (1920)
- Previous leagues: Buckeye League (1915); Interstate League (1913); Central League (1912); Ohio–Pennsylvania League (1905–1911)

Minor league titles
- League titles: 4 (1908, 1909, 1910, 1911)

Team data
- Previous names: Akron Buckeyes (1920); Akron Rubbernecks (1915); Akron Giants (1913); Akron Rubbermen (1912); Akron Champs (1907–1911); Akron Rubbernecks (1906); Akron Buckeyes (1905)

The Akron Champs was the dominant name of a minor league baseball team that represented Akron, Ohio between 1907 and 1911. The Champs won four consecutive Ohio–Pennsylvania League championships from 1908 to 1911.

== History ==
The team began play in 1905 as Akron Buckeyes and were members of the Ohio–Pennsylvania League when the league was formed. In 1906 to the Akron Rubbernecks, an reflection of the city's top industry. Since 1880, Akron was the home of Goodyear, BFGoodrich, and Firestone, making Akron the "Rubber Capital" of the world.

The manager of the Akron team during their first three seasons was Walter East, who would later become the basketball coach at the University of Akron men's basketball team. East however also made headlines in the sport of professional football. In 1906, he played football for the Massillon Tigers of the "Ohio League" and is best known for his role fixing a championship football series in 1906 between the Canton Bulldogs and the Tigers. However, in Akron East was seen as being the hapless victim in the scandal. He was retained as manager of the Akron baseball team. East boasted of fixing a college football game, as well as a baseball game in 1905. However, in the summer of 1907, Akron owners', John Windsor and Ben Campbell, argued over retaining East as the Akron manager. The decision reportedly led to a fist-fight between the two owners. A reporter humorous wrote "It was the first time two men got into a fight over another man." Bob Quinn then bought the Akron team and kept East on as manager for the 1907 season.

However the team became known as the Akron Champs, a year later, and East was replaced by John Breckinridge as the team's manager. From 1908 until 1911, Akron won four consecutive Ohio–Pennsylvania League pennants. During this era, a team that won a league pennant was sometimes known as "Champion" or "Champ" the next season. When a champion failed to repeat the name was dropped.

In 1912, the club moved into the Class-B Central League and again look to the city's rubber industry and became the Akron Rubbermen. In 1913, the team joined the Interstate League and was named the Akron Giants, in honor of the 1911 and 1912 New York Giants who had won back-to-back National League pennants. Akron had just won four consecutive pennants between 1908 and 1911. After a year off, the team was once again named the Akron Rubbernecks, in 1915, as Akron joined the short-lived Buckeye League.

The team was reestablished one final time in 1920 as the Akron Buckeyes and was Akron's entry into the double-A International League. The Buckeyes posted an 88–63 record, but finished 21 games behind the Baltimore Orioles for 4th place overall. The Buckeyes team featured Jim Thorpe, who was considered the Greatest Athlete of the Twentieth Century. In 1920 Thorpe was one of just 5 players to hit 13–15 triples and tied for the team lead with 16 home runs. The future member of the Pro Football Hall of Fame, and current member of the Canton Bulldogs, had a team-high batting average of .360 and a team-high of 22 stolen bases, while scoring 102 runs. However the club folded at the end of the season and in 1921 they were replaced by the Newark Bears.

== Year-by-year records ==
Year	Record	Finish	Manager	Playoffs
1907	83-53	3rd	Walter East	No playoffs held
1908	81-36	1st	John Breckinridge	League champions No playoffs held
1909	81-40	1st	Bill Schwartz	League champions No playoffs held
1910	73-53	1st	Lee Fohl	League champions No playoffs held
1911	90-42	1st	Jack McAllister / Lee Fohl	League champions No playoffs held
