= Canton Giants =

American minor league baseball team (1905–1915)

- 1905–1915; (1905–1913, 1915); Canton, Ohio

Minor league affiliations
- Previous classes: Class D (1915); Class B (1912–1913); Class C (1908–1911); Class B (1905–1907); Class C (1905)
- League: Buckeye League (1915)
- Previous leagues: Interstate League (1913); Central League (1912); Ohio–Pennsylvania League (1908–1911); Central League (1905–1907); Ohio–Pennsylvania League (1905)

Team data
- Previous names: Canton Giants (1915); Canton Senators (1913); Canton Statesmen (1912); Canton Deubers (1910–1911); Canton Watchmakers (1908–1909); Canton Chinamen (1906–1907); Canton Red Stockings (1905); Canton Protectives (1905)

The Canton Giants was the final name of a minor league baseball team that represented Canton, Ohio, between 1905 and 1915. In 1905 Canton fielded a team called the Canton Protectives which a charter member of Ohio–Pennsylvania League. On July 10, 1905, the Fort Wayne Railroaders relocated to Canton for the remainder of their season to form the Canton Red Stockings of the Central League. The team remained in the Central League for the next two seasons and were renamed the Canton Chinamen, in a name play on Canton, China. The city returned to the Ohio–Pennsylvania League Canton Watchmakers. In 1910 and 1911, the club was renamed the Canton Deubers. The team name changed once again as the club rejoined the Central League in 1912 to the Canton Statesmen. The following year the club joined the Interstate League as the Canton Senators. After not fielding a team in 1914, the club played in 1915 as the Canton Giants in the Buckeye League. Team disbanded June 11, 1915, and the league folded after the season. Canton would not have another professional team until the Canton Terriers began play in 1928.

== Year-by-year record ==
Year	Record	Finish	Manager	Playoffs
1905	19-40	NA	Bill Delaney	none
1905	25-37	7th	Bade Myers & George Williams	Fort Wayne moved to Canton on July 10
1906	85-63	3rd	Bade Myers	none
1907	69-64	3rd	Bade Myers	none
1908	65-54	3rd	Ed Murphy & Thomas Lindsay	none
1909	55-67	5th	Van Patterson	none
1910	72-54	2nd	Ferdinand Drumm	none
1911	75-59	4th	Ferdinand Drumm	none
1912	64-66	7th	Ed Gremminger	none
1913	29-44	7th	Bade Myers	none
1915	5-11	NA	Bill Prout & Charles Skelley	Team disbanded June 11
