= Frank McCormick =

American baseball player (1911–1982)

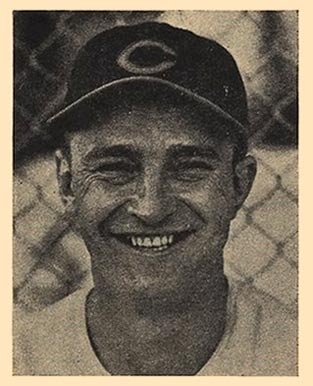
- First baseman
- Born: June 9, 1911; New York City, New York, U.S.
- Died: November 21, 1982 (aged 71); Manhasset, New York, U.S.
- Batted: Right Threw: Right

MLB debut
- September 11, 1934, for the Cincinnati Reds

Last MLB appearance
- October 3, 1948, for the Boston Braves

MLB statistics
- Batting average: .299
- Home runs: 128
- Runs batted in: 954
- Stats at Baseball Reference

Teams
- Cincinnati Reds (1934, 1937–1945); Philadelphia Phillies (1946–1947); Boston Braves (1947–1948)

Career highlights and awards
- 9× All-Star (1938–1946); World Series champion (1940); NL MVP (1940); NL RBI leader (1939); Cincinnati Reds Hall of Fame

Frank Andrew McCormick (June 9, 1911 – November 21, 1982) was an American professional baseball first baseman who played fifteen seasons in Major League Baseball (MLB). Nicknamed "Buck" in honor of Frank Buck, he played for the Cincinnati Reds, Philadelphia Phillies and Boston Braves from 1934 to 1948. He batted and threw right-handed and was listed at 6 feet 4 inches (1.93 m) and 205 pounds (93 kg).

McCormick signed with the Cincinnati Reds as an amateur free agent in 1934 and played for their minor league affiliate in Beckley until September of that same year, when the Reds promoted him to the major leagues. After spending twelve seasons with the organization, McCormick was sold to the Philadelphia Phillies, where he spent the next two seasons. In the middle of the 1947 season, he was released and subsequently joined the Boston Braves, where he played the 1948 World Series as his final appearance in a major league game. He is most famous for winning the National League Most Valuable Player Award in 1940, the second of three consecutive years where a Red won the award. The Reds were only the second team to ever have a player on the roster win the award in three straight seasons (the first was the Philadelphia Athletics, who did so from 1931 to 1933) and the first to do so with three separate players, which has only been accomplished three times since.

== Early life ==
McCormick was born on June 9, 1911, in New York City. His father, Andrew McCormick, was a railroad worker. As a child, he played sandlot ball and participated in baseball at his high school and church's leagues, playing in the outfield. He made the decision to play professional baseball at seventeen and tried out for several major league teams. After he was rejected by the Philadelphia Athletics, Washington Senators and New York Giants, in 1934, he took a $50 loan (equivalent to $1,203 in 2025) from his uncle in order to go to the Cincinnati Reds' tryout held in Beckley, West Virginia.

McCormick's manager at the sandlot team encouraged him to switch positions to first base, citing how there was less competition for the spot compared to the outfield. His performance at the tryout left a lasting impression on former major league player and renowned scout Bobby Wallace, who signed the 23-year-old.

== Professional career ==
=== Minor leagues ===
McCormick began his professional baseball career for the Beckley Black Knights, a minor league baseball team that were members of the Middle Atlantic League. In 120 games played and 487 at bats that season, he posted a batting average of .347 and garnered 169 hits. His stellar performance that year earned him a promotion to the major leagues. After he was exiled back to the minors, he split the 1935 season between five teams—the Dayton Ducks, Decatur Commodores, Nashville Volunteers, Fort Worth Cats and Toronto Maple Leafs—and batted .277 and made 121 hits throughout the entire season. In 1936, he moved to the Durham Bulls, a minor league baseball team that competed in the Piedmont League. He began the season in a disappointing fashion before his manager, Johnny Gooch, advised him to modify his batting grip. The change helped McCormick tremendously, as he led the league with a .381 batting average that season and finished with 211 hits, 49 doubles and 15 home runs. His final stint in the minor leagues saw him bat .322 with the Syracuse Chiefs in 1937.

=== Cincinnati Reds ===
McCormick made his major league debut for the Reds on September 11, 1934, at the age of 23, entering the game as a pinch-hitter for pitcher Ray Kolp in a 5–2 loss against the Brooklyn Dodgers. He played just 12 games with the Reds and though he batted .313 in 16 at-bats, he was demoted to the minor leagues, where he was consigned for the next two seasons. He was briefly brought back up to the majors in 1937, but after the Reds were unable to fit him into one position, he was sent back down and remained there until September 19. In his first day back with the team, he amassed seven hits in a doubleheader and finished the season with a .325 batting average in 83 at-bats.

McCormick became the Reds' full-time first baseman from 1938 onwards, replacing Buck Jordan. That year, he had 106 runs batted in (RBI), finished third in the National League in batting average (.327) and led the majors in hits with 209. In recognition of his brilliant performance in his first full year in the major leagues, McCormick was named the unofficial "Rookie of the Year" by the Associated Press.

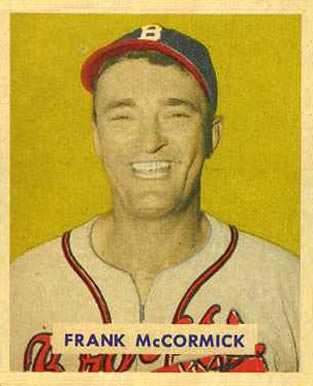
McCormick in 1949

The 1939 season saw another strong showing from McCormick both offensively and defensively. He led the National League in hits (209), drove in 128 RBIs to become the league's RBI champion and finished first in fielding percentage at first base (.996). His impressive performance during the latter half of the season was recognized as being a key factor in the Reds' drive to win the pennant. The Reds advanced to the 1939 World Series, where they lost to the New York Yankees in a four-game sweep. In spite of his team's performance, he was still able to maintain a .400 batting average throughout the series. His contributions to the team that year led to him being accepted into the "Jungle Club" of Reds' infielders, who gave him the nickname "Wildcat". He had a banner year in 1940, which saw him hit .309 while having a league-leading 191 hits and 44 doubles to be awarded league MVP. In the World Series, he had six whole hits with zero RBIs, but the Reds won in seven games over the Detroit Tigers.

=== Last years ===
He was then sold to the Philadelphia Phillies in 1946 for $30,000. In his first season there, he had just one error in 134 games at first base while being named an All Star for his ninth straight season. It did not help his cause when he was released in 1947, however, as he batted just .225 in 15 games before being released. He soon signed with the Boston Braves and platooned with Earl Torgeson, the result being that he hit .354 in 81 games. He continued the pinch-hitting in 1948, where he batted .250 for the pennant-winning Braves. He served as a pinch hitter in three games of the 1948 World Series, collecting a hit in Game 3 before grounding out in the decisive Game 6 that the Braves lost. He was released after the season and retired at the age of 37.

=== Career summary ===
In a 13-season career, McCormick posted a .299 batting average with 1,711 hits, 128 home runs and 951 runs batted in in 1,534 games played. An excellent first baseman, his career fielding percentage was .995.

He was the Most Valuable Player in the National League in 1940. That season, he led the league in hits (191) and doubles (44) as the Reds stormed to their second consecutive National League championship and the 1940 World Series title. McCormick was selected to the NL All-Star team for nine straight seasons (1938–1946, although there was no game played in 1945). McCormick also led his league in hits two other times (1938–1939, with 209 each season) and in RBI in 1939 (with 128). He topped all NL first basemen in fielding percentage four times in 1939, 1940, 1941, and 1946. In three World Series (1939–1940 with the Reds and 1948 with the Braves), he batted .271 with 13 hits in 14 games played.

He is one of only three NL players with three consecutive hits titles. The others are Ginger Beaumont (1902–04) and Rogers Hornsby (1920–22). McCormick set an MLB first basemen record with 138 straight errorless games (1945–46). He is a member of the Cincinnati Reds Hall of Fame.

== Personal life ==
At the conclusion of his 1938 rookie season, McCormick married his wife Vera (née Preedy) on October 8. Together, they had two daughters, Judith and Nancy. After his Major League career ended, McCormick went on to manage the Quebec Braves, Lima Phillies and Bradford Phillies, spending one season at each minor league baseball affiliate from 1949 to 1951. He proceeded to coach his former team—the now-renamed Cincinnati Redlegs—in 1955, replacing Dick Bartell. After his coaching tenure finished, he continued his affiliation with the Reds as a scout, as well as a broadcaster, announcer and analyst on WLWT-TV from 1958 to 1968, before moving back to his hometown and working as the director of ticket sales for the New York Yankees until his death.

=== Death ===
McCormick died of cancer on November 21, 1982, in Manhasset, New York, at the age of 71. He was interred at the Cemetery of the Holy Rood in Westbury, New York.

== See also ==
- List of Major League Baseball annual runs batted in leaders
- List of Major League Baseball annual doubles leaders
