= George Staller =

American baseball player, scout and coach (1916-1992)

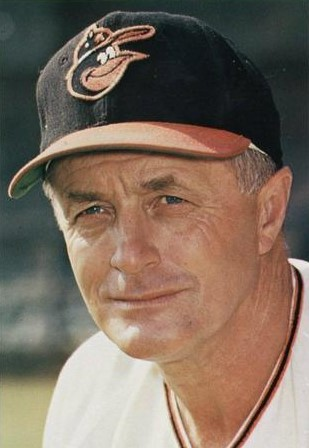
- Outfielder
- Born: April 1, 1916; Dauphin County, Pennsylvania, U.S.
- Died: July 3, 1992 (aged 76); Harrisburg, Pennsylvania, U.S.
- Batted: Left Threw: Left

MLB debut
- September 14, 1943, for the Philadelphia Athletics

Last MLB appearance
- October 3, 1943, for the Philadelphia Athletics

MLB statistics
- Batting average: .271
- Home runs: 3
- Runs batted in: 12
- Stats at Baseball Reference

Teams
- Philadelphia Athletics (1943)

Career highlights and awards
- World Series champion (1970)

George Walborn Staller (April 1, 1916 – July 3, 1992) was an American outfielder, scout and coach in Major League Baseball. He served as first base coach on Earl Weaver's Baltimore Orioles staff from July 11, 1968, through 1975, working on the Orioles' three consecutive American League championship teams (1969, 1970 and 1971) and Baltimore's 1970 World Series champion.

== Career ==
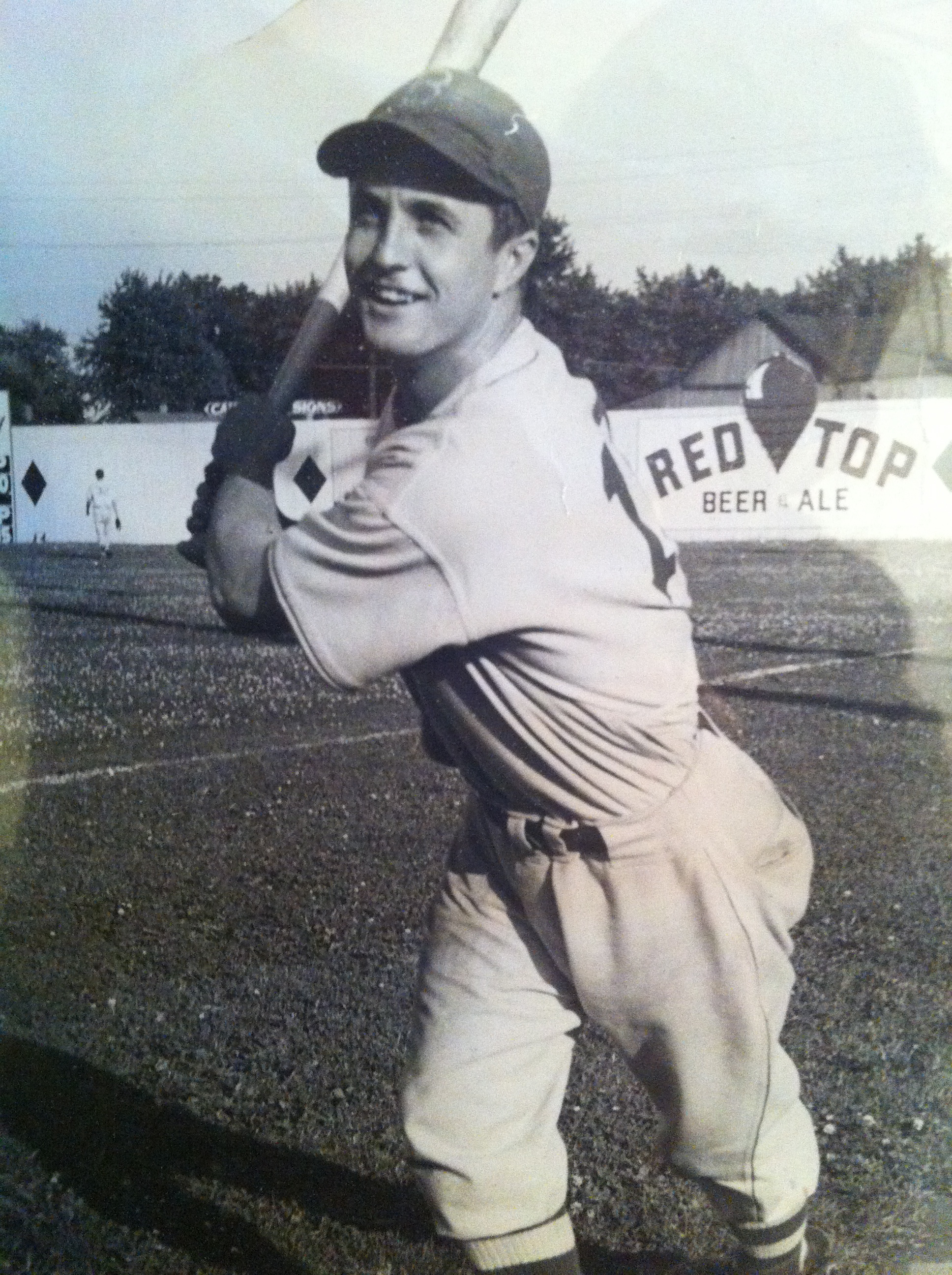
Staller as a player in the Brooklyn Dodgers farm system

Born in Rutherford Heights, Dauphin County, Pennsylvania, Staller threw and batted left-handed and stood 5 ft 11 in (1.80 m) (180 cm) tall and weighed 200 pounds (91 kg). He originally signed with the Brooklyn Dodgers in 1937 and progressed as far as the top-level Montreal Royals in 1940–41, where he led the International League in doubles (40) and triples (12) in 1940. But his only Major League service occurred in 1943, when he was purchased by the Philadelphia Athletics from the minor league version of the Baltimore Orioles after leading the 1943 IL in runs batted in (with 98). Staller appeared in 21 games with the 1943 A's, batting .271 with 23 hits in 85 at bats, including three home runs and 12 RBI. He then joined the armed forces, serving as a United States Marine in the Pacific Theater of Operations and missing the 1944–45 seasons.

Staller was a minor league manager for 14 seasons, 1948 through 1961. He began in the A's system (1948–53), then moved with Philadelphia general manager Arthur Ehlers to the American League Orioles organization in its first season in Baltimore, 1954. Staller reached the Triple-A level for one season, in 1960 with the Vancouver Mounties; his career managing record was 922 wins, 1,043 losses (.469).

Staller's first term as an Orioles coach came in 1962, when he served one year under skipper Billy Hitchcock. Then, after 5 1/2 seasons as a Baltimore scout, he rejoined the Orioles staff when Weaver was promoted from first-base coach to manager in July 1968. Staller served until his retirement from the field at the close of the 1975 season. He was listed as a scout for the Seattle Mariners for the expansion team's inaugural American League season, 1977. George Staller died at age 76 in Harrisburg, Pennsylvania.

Sporting positions
Preceded by Earl Weaver	Baltimore Orioles First Base Coach; 1968–1975	Succeeded by Jim Frey
