= Sandusky Sailors =

- 1936–1937; Sandusky, Ohio

Minor league affiliations
- Class: Class D (1936–1937)
- League: Ohio State League (1936–1937)

Major league affiliations
- Team: None (1936–1937)

Minor league titles
- League titles (0): None
- Wild card berths (1): 1937

Team data
- Name: Sandusky Sailors (1936–1937)
- Ballpark: Medusa Park (1936–1937)

The Sandusky Sailors were a minor league baseball team based in Sandusky, Ohio. In 1937 and 1938, the Sailors played as exclusively as members of the Class D level Ohio State League, before the franchise relocated to become the Marion Presidents during the 1938 season. Sandusky hosted minor league home games at Medusa Park.

== History ==
Minor league baseball began in Sandusky in 1887, when the Sandusky Suds played the season as members of the original Ohio State League, finishing in fourth place. The "Sailors" were preceded in minor league play by the 1893 Sandusky "Sandies" who played the season as members of the independent Ohio-Michigan League.

After a four decade hiatus from hosting minor league baseball, the 1936 Sandusky Sailors were formed and began play as members of the six–team Class D level Ohio State League. Joining Sandusky in the six–team Ohio State League in 1936 were the Fostoria Cardinals, Fremont Reds, Mansfield Tigers, New Philadelphia Red Birds and Tiffin Mud Hens teams, with the league beginning play on May 14, 1936.

The "Sailors" nickname corresponds to local history and geography. Sandusky is located on the Sandusky Bay and Lake Erie and has long been home to sailing. The Old Soldiers and Sailors Home was founded in Sandusky in 1886. Today, the Sandusky Sailing Club continues operation and memberships.

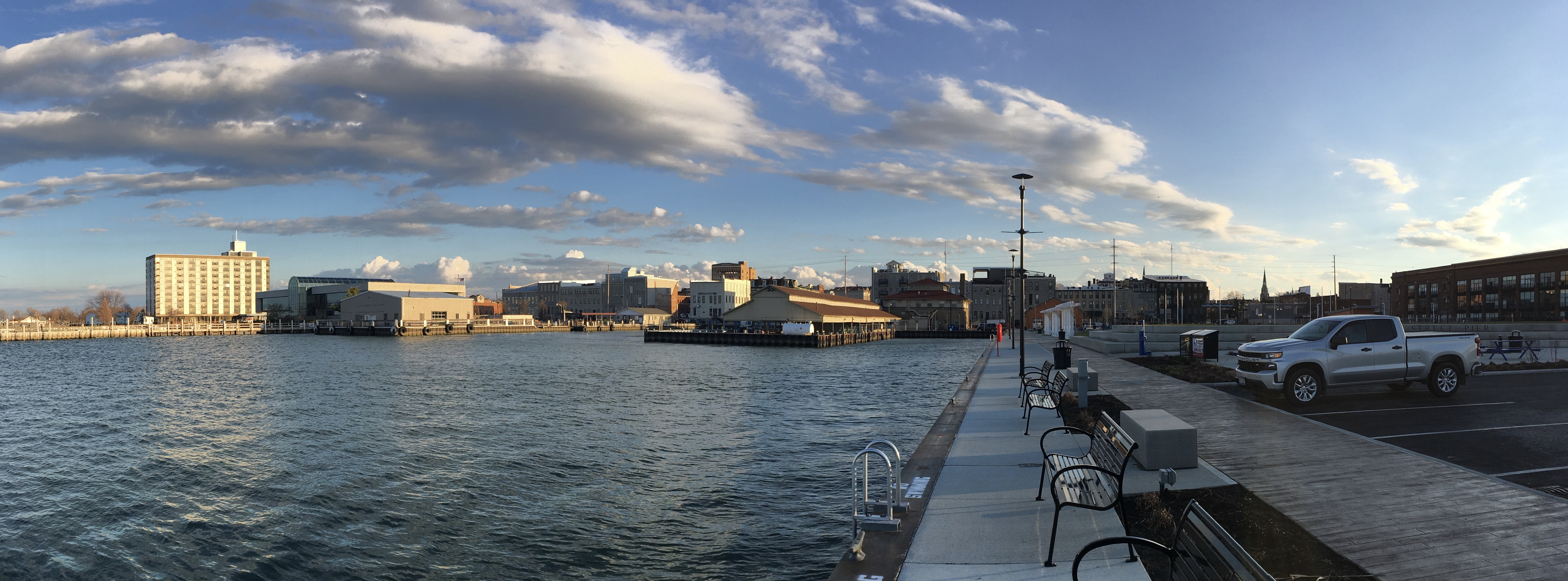
(2020) Landward Panorama from Jackson Pier. Sandusky, Ohio.

Beginning play in the 1936 Ohio State League, the Sailors finished in second place. Sandusky ended the season with a record of 51–47, playing the season under player/manager Chappie Geygan. The Sailors finished 10.5 games behind the first place Tiffin Mud Hens in the final Ohio State League regular season standings. During the season, the Mansfield and New Philadelphia franchises disbanded. No playoffs were held as Tiffin won both halves of the split–season schedule.

The 1937 Sandusky Sailors continued Ohio State League play, before relocating during the season. On June 22, 1937, the Sailors had a record of 15–7, when the franchise relocated during the season to Marion, Ohio, becoming the Marion Presidents. Under returning manager Chappie Geygan, the 1937 Sandusky/Marion team placed second in the six–team league. With a 61–30 record, the team finished 2.0 games behind the first place Mansfield Red Sox in the final regular season standings. Pitchers Gordon Mann and Marion Spence tied for the Ohio State League with 18 victories and player/manager Chappie Geygan had a league leading 91 RBI for the Sailors/Presidents. Sandusky/Marion qualified for the playoffs, where the Findlay Browns swept the series in two games.

Marion did not return to play in the 1938 Ohio State League and Sandusky has not hosted another minor league team. In 2021, the Sandusky Ice Haulers began play as members of the Great Lakes Summer Collegiate League, a collegiate summer baseball league.

== The ballpark ==
The Sandusky Sailors hosted minor league home games at Medusa Park in Sandusky. The ballpark had a capacity of 1,500 and field dimensions of (left, center, right): 325–420–325. The Medusa Portland Cement Company was based in Sandusky and was a major employer in the era. The ballpark was formerly known as Esmond Athletic Field, with a large Esmond Dairy sign painted on the wall of the grandstand. The ballpark was reconstructed with new grandstands and lighting for the Sailors in 1936. The grandstands were later torn down in the 1940s. The ballpark was located on South Columbus Avenue in Sandusky.

== Timeline ==
Year(s)	# Yrs.	Team	Level	League	Ballpark
1936–1937	2	Sandusky Sailors	Class D	Ohio State League	Medusa Park

== Year–by–year records ==
Year	Record	Finish	Manager	Playoffs / notes
1936	51–47	2nd	Chappie Geygan	No playoffs held
1937	61–30	2nd	Chappie Geygan	Moved to Marion June 22 (15–7); Lost in 1st round

== Notable alumni ==
- Chappie Geygan (1936–1937, MGR)
- Ray Fitzgerald (1937)

== See also ==
- Sandusky Sailors players
