= Jim McLeod (baseball) =

American baseball player (1908-1981)

- Third baseman
- Born: September 12, 1908; Jones, Louisiana
- Died: August 3, 1981 (aged 72); Little Rock, Arkansas
- Batted: Right Threw: Right

MLB debut
- May 22, 1930, for the Washington Senators

Last MLB appearance
- October 1, 1933, for the Philadelphia Phillies

MLB statistics
- Batting average: .203
- Home runs: 0
- Runs batted in: 16
- Stats at Baseball Reference

Teams
- Washington Senators (1930, 1932); Philadelphia Phillies (1933)

Soule James McLeod (September 12, 1908 – August 3, 1981) was a Major League Baseball third baseman. McLeod played for the Washington Senators in 1930 and 1932, and the Philadelphia Phillies in 1933.
