= Andy Gilbert =

American baseball player and manager (1914–1992)

- Center fielder / Coach
- Born: July 18, 1914; Bradenville, Pennsylvania, U.S.
- Died: August 29, 1992 (aged 78); Davis, California, U.S.
- Batted: Right Threw: Right

MLB debut
- September 14, 1942, for the Boston Red Sox

Last MLB appearance
- May 7, 1946, for the Boston Red Sox

MLB statistics
- Batting average: .083
- Runs batted in: 1
- Hits: 1
- Stats at Baseball Reference

Teams
- As player: Boston Red Sox (1942, 1946); As coach: San Francisco Giants (1972–1975)

Andrew Gilbert (July 18, 1914 – August 29, 1992) was an American Major League Baseball player and coach and a minor league manager. He was a center fielder during the 1942 and 1946 seasons. Listed at 6' 0", 203 lb., Gilbert batted and threw right-handed.

A native of Bradenville, Pennsylvania, Gilbert entered the majors in 1942 with the Boston Red Sox, playing for them in six games before joining the military service during World War II (1943–45). After discharge, he rejoined the Red Sox in 1946, his last Major League season.

In parts of two seasons, Gilbert was a .083 hitter (1-for-12) with one run and one RBI in eight games. He did not hit a home run. As a defensive replacement, he collected six putouts for a perfect 1.000 fielding percentage.

Following his playing career, Gilbert became a successful minor league manager in 29 seasons with the New York/San Francisco Giants (1950–1980) and Atlanta Braves (1981–1982) organizations. He posted a 2,009–1,889 record for a .514 winning percentage, including league championships with the Springfield Giants (Eastern League, 1959, 1960 [co-champ] and 1961) and Amarillo Giants (Texas League, 1969 and 1971). He also coached during four seasons for the San Francisco Giants (1972–1975).

Gilbert died in Davis, California at age 78 and is buried in St. Vincent Cemetery in Latrobe, Pennsylvania.
