= Billy Holm =

American baseball player (1912–1977)

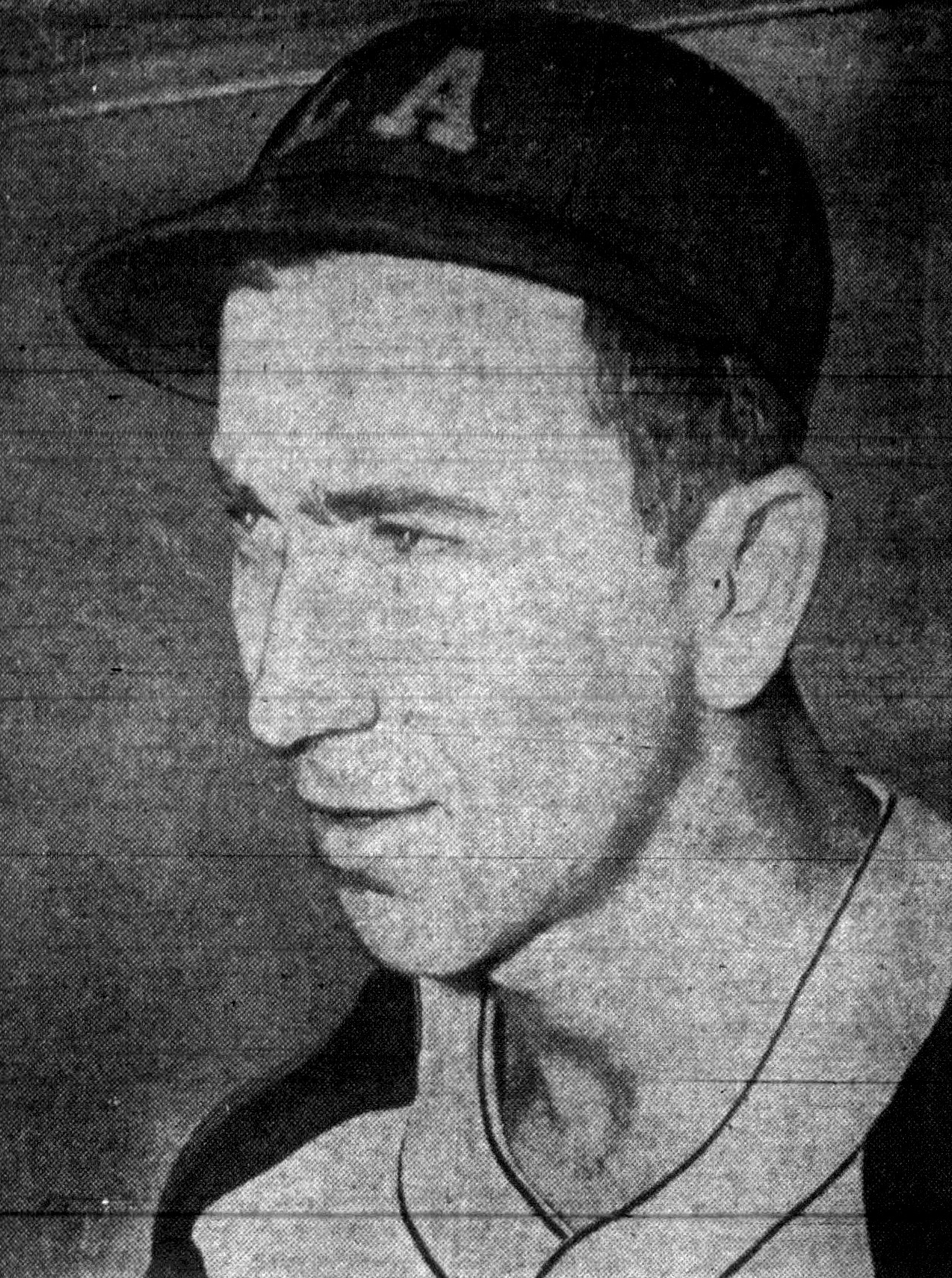
- Holm, circa 1943
- Catcher
- Born: July 21, 1912; Chicago, Illinois, U.S.
- Died: July 27, 1977 (aged 65); East Chicago, Indiana, U.S.
- Batted: Right Threw: Right

MLB debut
- September 24, 1943, for the Chicago Cubs

Last MLB appearance
- September 30, 1945, for the Boston Red Sox

MLB statistics
- Batting average: .156
- Home runs: 0
- Runs batted in: 15
- Stats at Baseball Reference

Teams
- Chicago Cubs (1943–1944); Boston Red Sox (1945)

William Frederick Holm (July 21, 1912 – July 27, 1977) was a Major League Baseball catcher who played for the Chicago Cubs (1943–1944) and Boston Red Sox (1945). A native of Chicago, he stood 5 ft 10 1/2 in (1.791 m) and weighed 168 lb (76 kg).

Holm is one of many ballplayers who only appeared in the major leagues during World War II. He made his major league debut on September 24, 1943, in a home game against the Philadelphia Blue Jays at Wrigley Field.

In a career total of 119 games he hit .156 (44-for-282, 39 singles) with 15 runs batted in and 22 runs scored. 41 walks, however, did push his on-base percentage up to .272. He made 8 errors in 417 chances for a fielding percentage of .981.
