= Ray Hathaway =

American baseball player (1916-2015)

- Pitcher
- Born: October 13, 1916; Greenville, Ohio, U.S.
- Died: February 11, 2015 (aged 98); Asheville, North Carolina, U.S.
- Batted: Right Threw: Right

MLB debut
- April 20, 1945, for the Brooklyn Dodgers

Last MLB appearance
- June 3, 1945, for the Brooklyn Dodgers

MLB statistics
- Win–loss record: 0–1
- Earned run average: 4.00
- Strikeouts: 3
- Innings pitched: 9
- Stats at Baseball Reference

Teams
- Brooklyn Dodgers (1945)

Ray Wilson Hathaway (October 13, 1916 – February 11, 2015) was an American Major League Baseball pitcher who appeared in four games for the Brooklyn Dodgers in 1945. The 28-year-old rookie right-hander stood 6 feet 0 inches (1.83 m) and weighed 165 pounds (75 kg).

Hathaway was born in Greenville, Ohio in October 1916. He was one of many ballplayers who only appeared in the major leagues during World War II. He made his major league debut on April 20, 1945 in relief against the New York Giants at the Polo Grounds. In his one major league start, the Dodgers lost to the Chicago Cubs at Wrigley Field, 5–3, on May 28, 1945. Season and career totals for 4 games include a 0–1 record, 1 start, no complete games, 3 games finished, and an ERA of 4.00 in 9 innings pitched.

He had a lengthy career as a minor league baseball manager following his playing days. He was inducted in the South Atlantic League Hall of Fame. Hathaway was the uncle of former major league pitcher Dave Burba.

At the time of his death in February 2015, he had been the second oldest former major league player still alive. Ironically the only man he was behind in this distinction, Mike Sandlock, was a teammate and played in Hathaway's first major league game, and Hathaway's only career start batting 8th just ahead of Hathaway in that game. This means Ray was never the oldest living player from his major league debut, or even the oldest living player to bat in the same inning as he had batted. (Sandlock batted before him in both of Ray's major league at bats.) His nephew is former Giants pitcher Dave Burba.
