= Ralph DiLullo =

American baseball player (1911–1999)

Ralph S. DiLullo (March 31, 1911 – August 9, 1999) was a professional baseball player, manager and scout whose career in the sport spanned 60 years.

DiLullo was a catcher in the minor leagues and later managed at that level in the Pittsburgh Pirates and Detroit Tigers organizations for five seasons. He then worked for the Chicago Cubs as a scout and was responsible for the signing of pitchers Joe Niekro and Bruce Sutter. He joined the Major League Baseball Scouting Bureau in 1975 and worked there until his 1993 retirement. He briefly re-joined the Cubs system in 1994, but soon retired once again.

== Honors, awards and recognition ==
In 1986, he was named the East Coast Scout of the Year by the Scout of the Year Foundation. The Ralph DiLullo Award, handed out by the East Coast Scouts Association, and the Ralph DiLullo Memorial Award, handed out by the New York Professional Hot Stove League, are named in his honor. He was elected to the Professional Baseball Scout's Wall of Fame, located at Richmond County Bank Ballpark, in 2006. A book, Foresight 20/20: The Life of Baseball Scout Ralph DiLullo, was written about him. Upon his death in 1999, Grahame Jones of the Los Angeles Times called DiLullo, "baseball's premier scout."

== Personal life ==
DiLullo was born in Capracotta, Italy and died in Paterson, New Jersey, United States. His son, Ralph DiLullo, Jr., was a multi-sport star at Wagner College who spent two years in the minor leagues.
