= Marion Cubs =

The Marion Cubs were an Ohio State League (1947) and Ohio–Indiana League (1948) baseball team based in Marion, Ohio, USA. They were affiliated with the Chicago Cubs and played their home games at Lincoln Park.
