= Marion Red Sox =

The Marion Red Sox were a minor league baseball team that existed from 1949 to 1951. Affiliated with the Boston Red Sox, they played in the Ohio–Indiana League in Marion, Ohio.

In 1949, they were managed by Wally Millies and went 74-63, finishing fourth in the league overall. They went 91-49 in 1950, under the guidance of George Susce and Elmer Yoter, and 1951 they went 91-37 for a first-place finish under the guidance of Yoter. They won the Ohio–Indiana League championship in 1950 and 1951.

The team played their home games at Lincoln Park.
