= Muncie Reds =

- 1947–1950; Muncie, Indiana

Minor league affiliations
- Class: Class D (1947-1950)
- League: Ohio State League (1947); Ohio-Indiana League (1948-1950)

Major league affiliations
- Team: Cincinnati Reds (1947-1950)

Team data
- Ballpark: McCulloch Park
- Manager: Mike Blazo

The Muncie Reds were an Ohio State League (1947) and Ohio–Indiana League (1948–1950) baseball team based in Muncie, Indiana, USA. They were affiliated with the Cincinnati Reds and played at McCulloch Park.
