= Ohio State League =

US state baseball league

- Classification: Independent (1887, 1889, 1898); Class D (1908–1916, 1936–1941, 1944–1947)
- Sport: Minor League Baseball
- First season: 1887
- Folded: 1947
- Replaced by: Ohio–Indiana League
- Director: L. A. Moore (1887)
- President: George Clugston (1887); Charles Voegle (1887); D.A. Nichols (1889); George Hammond (1898); Robert Quinn (1908–1909); Robert W. Read (1910–1914); Joseph T. Carr (1915–1916); Harry Smith (1908–1909); Paul H. Shank (1938–1940); Joe Donnelly (1941, 1944); Frank M. Colley (1945–1947)
- No. of teams: 41
- Country: United States of America
- Most titles: 5 Portsmouth Cobblers/Truckers
- Related competitions: Tri-State League

The Ohio State League was a minor league baseball league that operated in numerous seasons between 1887 and 1947, predominantly as a Class D level league. League franchises were based in Indiana, Kentucky, Michigan, Ohio and West Virginia.

== History ==
The first "Ohio State League" was a baseball league in 1887 before changing names to the Tri-State League. The Kalamazoo Kazoos won the first league championship. The league played in the 1889 and 1898 seasons.

The first 20th century Ohio State League started in 1908 as a class D loop and ran through 1916.

Another Ohio State League was formed in 1936 and ran through 1947 except for a break in '42-'43 due to World War II. In 1945, the OSL was one of just four class D circuits in operation, yet it was one of the first of dozens of leagues to collapse after World War II.

The class D Ohio–Indiana League was formed in 1948 with eight teams, with seven of the eight cities coming from the Ohio State League. Six teams made their home in Ohio and the remaining two where from Indiana. This league lasted through 1951.

The Portsmouth Cobblers won four Ohio State League championships.

Baseball Hall of Fame member Ed Delahanty played for the 1887 Mansfield team.

== Cities represented ==
- Akron, Ohio: Akron Acorns 1887, 1889
- Canton, Ohio: Canton 1887, 1898
- Charleston, West Virginia: Charleston Senators 1913–1916
- Chillicothe, Ohio: Chillicothe Infants 1910–1912; Chillicothe Babes 1913–1916
- Columbus, Ohio: Columbus Buckeyes 1887
- Coshocton, Ohio: Coshocton 1898
- Dayton, Ohio: Dayton Indians 1946–1947
- Findlay, Ohio: Findlay Browns 1937–1938; Findlay Oilers (baseball) 1939–1940; Findlay Browns 1941
- Fostoria, Ohio: Fostoria Cardinals 1936; Fostoria Red Birds 1937–1941
- Frankfort, Kentucky: Frankfort Old Taylors 1915–1916
- Fremont, Ohio: Fremont Reds 1936–1938; Fremont Green Sox 1938–1941
- Hamilton, Ohio: Hamilton Mechanics 1911; Hamilton Maroons 1913
- Huntington, West Virginia: Huntington Blue Sox 1913–1914 Huntington Boosters 1916
- Ironton, Ohio: Ironton Orphans 1912; Ironton Nailers 1913–1915
- Kalamazoo, Michigan: Kalamazoo Kazoos 1887
- Lancaster, Ohio: Lancaster Lanks 1908–1911
- Lexington, Kentucky: Lexington Colts 1913–1916
- Lima, Ohio: Lima Cigarmakers 1908–1912; Lima Pandas 1939–1941; Lima Red Birds 1944; Lima Reds 1945; Lima Terriers 1946–1947
- Mansfield, Ohio: Mansfield 1887; Mansfield Pioneers 1908–1909; Mansfield Brownies 1912; Mansfield Tigers 1936; Mansfield Red Sox 1937; Mansfield Braves 1939–1941
- Marion, Ohio: Marion Diggers 1908–1912; Marion Presidents 1937; Marion Diggers 1944; Marion Cardinals 1945–1946; Marion Cubs
- Massillon, Ohio: Massillion 1898
- Maysville, Kentucky: Maysville 1913–1914; Maysville Angels 1915; Maysville Burley Cubs 1916
- Middletown, Ohio: Middletown Red Sox 1944; Middletown Rockets 1945–1946
- Muncie, Indiana: Muncie Reds 1947
- Newark, Ohio: Newark 1889; Newark Newks 1908–1911; Newark Skeeters 1912; Newark Moundsmen 1944–1947
- Newport, Kentucky: Newport Brewers 1914
- New Philadelphia, Ohio: New Philadelphia Red Birds 1936
- Paris, Kentucky: Paris 1914
- Piqua, Ohio: Piqua Picks 1911
- Portsmouth, Ohio: Portsmouth Cobblers 1908–1915; Portsmouth Truckers (1916)
- Richmond, Indiana: Richmond Roses 1946–1947
- Salem, Ohio: Salem 1898
- Sandusky, Ohio: Sandusky Suds 1887; Sandusky Sailors 1936–1937
- Springfield, Ohio: Springfield Reapers 1908, 1911; Springfield Giants 1944–1947
- Steubenville, Ohio: Steubenville Stubs 1887
- Tiffin, Ohio: Tiffin 1889; Tiffin Mud Hens 1936–1941
- Wheeling, West Virginia: Wheeling 1887; Wheeling Nailers 1898
- Youngstown, Ohio: Youngstown 1889
- Zanesville, Ohio: Zanesville Kickapoos 1887; Zanesville Clay Diggers 1898; Zanesville Dodgers 1944–1947

== Standings & statistics ==
=== 1887, 1889, 1898 ===
1887 Ohio State League

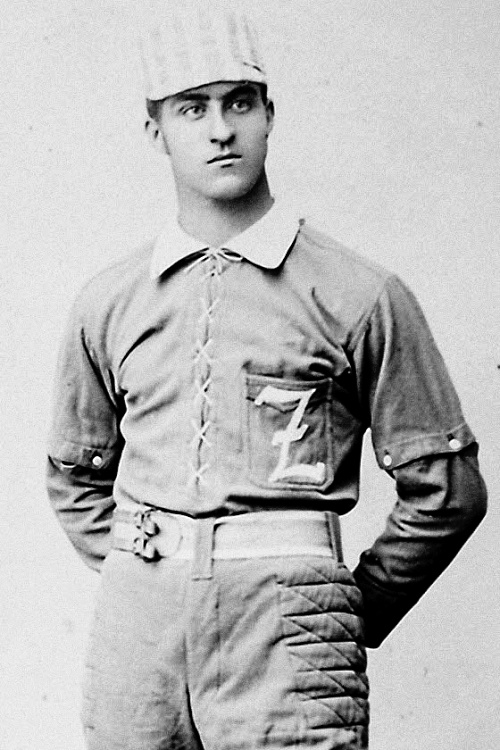
Billy Gumbert in uniform for the Zanesville Kickapoos, in the inaugural 1887 OSL season.

Team standings	W	L	PCT	GB	Managers
Kalamazoo Kazoos	73	34	.682	-	Al Buckenberger
Zanesville Kickapoos	58	46	.558	13½	Patrick Welsh / Pete McShannic
Wheeling	53	48	.525	17	Jack Cronin / William English / Tom Nicholson / Henry Myers
Sandusky Suds	53	49	.520	17½	George Curry
Columbus Buckeyes	50	55	.476	22	W.A.Calhoun / John Morrissey / Jim Gifford / Buck West
Mansfield	46	56	.451	24½	Sandy McDermott / Bob Allen / Frank O'Brien
Canton	22	14	.611	NA	H.H. Kerr / William Zecher
Akron Acorns	32	60	.348	NA	A.B. Showers / Charlie Morton / Sandy McDermott / Bill Irwin
Steubenville Stubs	9	34	.209	NA	Parson Nicholson / Pete Woods / Jimmy Wood

Steubenville disbanded June 29; Canton entered the league August 4; Akron disbanded September 3.

Player statistics
Player	Team	Stat	Tot	Player	Team	Stat	Tot
Ed Hutchinson	Columbus	BA	.395	Mother Watson	Kalamazoo	W	29
Ed Stapleton	Kalamazoo	Runs	121	Bill Irwin	Akron/Kalamazoo	SO	283
John Crogan	Wheeling	Hits	184	Mother Watson	Kalamazoo	Pct	763: 29–9
Ed Stapleton	Kalamazoo	HR	12				

1889 Ohio State League

Team standings	W	L	PCT	GB	Managers
Akron Akrons	17	9	.654	-	Harry Roberts / Charles Pike
Youngstown	13	14	.481	4½	Harry Smith
Newark	8	11	.421	NA	Joe Somers
Tiffin	8	12	.400	NA	Tom Cahill / Son Lease

Newark disbanded September 16; Tiffin disbanded September 18

1898 Ohio State League

Team standings	W	L	PCT	GB	Managers
Canton	10	8	.556	-	John Durham
Massilllon	6	5	.545	½	Frank Vogt / Ray Markel
Zanesville Clay Diggers	3	3	.500	1	Charley Jewell
Wheeling Nailers	8	9	.471	1½	Joseph Starr
Salem	4	8	.333	3	D.R. Gannon
Coshocton	8	6	.571	NA	C.F. Prince

Zanesville entered the league May 30; Coshocton disbanded June 2
League disbanded June 5 due to poor weather and Sunday baseball restrictions

=== 1908 to 1916 ===
1908 Ohio State League

Team standings	W	L	PCT	GB	Managers
Lancaster Red Roses	92	57	.617	-	Kurt Ellston / Paddy Fox
Lima Cigarmakers	80	67	.544	11	Nick Kahl / Jim Jackson
Marion Diggers	78	71	.523	14	Charles O'Day
Mansfield Pioneers	76	73	.510	16	Cal McVey / Tim Flood
Newark Newks	74	75	.497	18	Bob Berryhill / Harry Eells
Springfield Reapers / Portsmouth Cobblers	46	103	.309	46.0	Ed Ranskick / John Quinn

Springfield moved to Portsmouth June 16.

Player statistics
Player	Team	Stat	Tot	Player	Team	Stat	Tot
Hughie Tate	Marion	BA	.320	Kirby White	Lancaster	W	28
Hughie Tate	Marion	Hits	169	Walt Justis	Lancaster	SO	293
Curly Brown	Lancaster	Runs	103	Charlie Pickett	Lima	Pct	700: 21–9
Frank Foutz	Lima	HR	12	Jim Riley	Lima	SB	80

1909 Ohio State League

Team standings	W	L	PCT	GB	Managers
Lima Cigarmakers	79	50	.612	-	Lee Fohl
Marion Diggers	71	59	.546	8½	Charles O'Day / Jack Lewis
Mansfield Pioneers	63	58	.521	12	Tim Flood
Portsmouth Cobblers	48	76	.387	28½	William Doyle / Jack McCallister / Charles O'Day
Lancaster Lanks	53	53	.500	NA	Paddy Fox
Newark Newks	46	64	.418	NA	Homer Davidson / Erve Wratten

Newark and Lancaster both disbanded August 23.

Player statistics
Player	Team	Stat	Tot	Player	Team	Stat	Tot
Red Farrell	Marion	BA	.316	Ed Zmich	Marion	W	21
Joe Stanley	Marion	Hits	142	Andy Nelson	Lima	Pct	.800; 8–2
Charles Fink	Lima	Runs	91	Ed Willett	Marion	HR	6

1910 Ohio State League

Team standings	W	L	PCT	GB	Managers
Portsmouth Cobblers	86	52	.623	-	Pete Childs
Lima Cigarmakers	82	56	.594	4	Alfred Newnham
Marion Diggers	80	58	.580	6	Jack Lewis
Newark Newks	58	80	.420	28	Bob Berryhill / Charles Riehl / Hank O'Day
Lancaster Lanks	55	82	.401	30½	Al McClintock / Guy Sample / Heinie Peitz
Chillicothe Infants	52	85	.380	33½	Goat Cochran / Harvey Grubb / Louis Kibler / Zeke Wrigley

Player statistics
Player	Team	Stat	Tot	Player	Team	Stat	Tot
Hank O'Day	Portsmouth	BA	.324	Ted Goulait	Marion	W	24
Dick Breen	Portsmouth	Hits	151	John Henry Lloyd	Lima	Pct	.769; 10–3
Dick Breen	Portsmouth	Runs	88	Frank Nesser	Lima	HR	6

1911 Ohio State League

Team standings	W	L	PCT	GB	Managers
Springfield Reapers	84	55	.604	-	Charley O'Day
Marion Diggers	80	59	.576	4	Jack Lewis
Portsmouth Cobblers	78	61	.561	6	Pete Childs
Chillicothe Infants	78	62	.557	6½	Zeke Wrigley
Newark Newks/ Piqua Picks	72	65	.526	11	Alfred Newnham
Lima Cigarmakers	62	77	.446	22	Frank Nesser
Lancaster Lanks	53	84	.387	30	Charles Riehl / Gus Epler
Hamilton Mechanics	48	92	.343	36½	James Barton

Newark moved to Piqua June 22.

Player statistics
Player	Team	Stat	Tot	Player	Team	Stat	Tot
Bert Blue	Newark/Piqua	BA	.347	Roy Ashenfelder	Hamil/Spring	W	24
Bert Blue	Newark/Piqua	Hits	176	H. McCall	Marion	Pct	.800; 8–2
W. Colligan	Marion	Runs	119	Billy Kelly	Marion	HR	12

1912 Ohio State League

Team standings	W	L	PCT	GB	Managers
Portsmouth Cobblers	81	52	.609	-	Pete Childs
Mansfield Brownies	72	67	.518	12	Barry McCormick / Walter East / Ted Easterly
Newark Skeeters	70	68	.507	13½	John Grim / Billy Murray / Barry McCormick
Marion Diggers / Ironton Orphans	65	72	.474	18	Fred Johnston / Fred Odwell / Charley Moore
Lima Cigarmakers	64	73	.467	19	Zeke Wrigley
Chillicothe Infants	57	77	.425	24½	Jack Ryan / Jesse Tannehill / Alfred Newnham

Marion moved to Ironton July 15.

Player statistics
Player	Team	Stat	Tot	Player	Team	Stat	Tot
Waldo Jackley	Mar/Iron	BA	.357	George Boehler	Newark	W	27
Frank Nesser	Lima	Hits	170	Sandy Burk	Mar/Iron	Pct	.769; 20–6
John Shovelin	Newark	Runs	80	Waldo Jackley	Mar/Iron	HR	11

1913 Ohio State League

Team standings	W	L	PCT	GB	Managers
Chillicothe Babes	83	49	.629	-	Alfred Newnham
Charleston Senators	84	50	.627	-	Buzz Wetzel
Portsmouth Cobblers	83	55	.601	3	Pete Childs
Huntington Blue Sox	68	68	.500	17	Sam Wright / S. Redman
Lexington Colts	68	70	.483	18	Bill Reynolds / W. McKernan / Rex Dawson
Ironton Nailers	63	75	.456	23	Al McClintock / Archie Osborn
Hamilton Maroons	55	79	.441	29	Zeke Wrigley
Maysville Angels	38	96	.284	46	George Moore

Player statistics
Player	Team	Stat	Tot	Player	Team	Stat	Tot
Carl Ray	Charleston	BA	.366	Ed Donalds	Portsmouth	W	30
John Baggan	Portsmouth	Runs	105	Ed Donalds	Portsmouth	Pct	.789; 30–8
Frank Nesser	Chillicothe	Hits	178	Carl Ray	Charleston	HR	33

1914 Ohio State League

Team standings	W	L	PCT	GB	Managers
Portsmouth Cobblers	86	53	.723	-	Pete Childs
Charleston Senators	79	62	.560	8	Buzz Wetzel / Biddy Beers
Chillicothe Babes	73	64	.533	12	Alfred Newnham
Lexington Colts	66	68	.493	17½	Howard Guyn
Ironton Nailers	35	33	.514	NA	Dick Smith
Huntington Blue Sox	39	47	.453	NA	John Siegle / Nixey Callahan
Maysville Angels	30	51	.370	NA	Harry Chapman / Ray Montgomery
Newport-Paris	19	49	.279	NA	Fred Applegate / Red Munson

Ironton disbanded July 5; Newport-Paris disbanded July 5; Huntington and Maysville both disbanded July 22.

Player statistics
Player	Team	Stat	Tot	Player	Team	Stat	Tot
Wilbur Crouch	Lexing/Ports	BA	.327	Abel Applegate	Charleston	W	22
John Baggan	Portsmouth	Runs	116	Paul Carter	Portsmouth	W	22
John Baggan	Portsmouth	Hits	182	Ernie Calbert	Hunting/Charles	HR	17

1915 Ohio State League

Team standings	W	L	PCT	GB	Managers
Portsmouth Cobblers	71	42	.628	-	Chet Spencer
Lexington Colts	63	48	.568	7	Howard Guyn
Chillicothe Babes / Huntington Babes / Maysville Angels	58	55	.513	13	Josh Devore
Charleston Senators	58	63	.479	17	Biddy Beers
Frankfort Old Taylors	45	65	.409	24½	Pat Bohen / Jack Hayden
Ironton Nailers	47	69	.405	25½	Dick Smith

Chillicothe moved to Huntington July 13; Huntington moved to Maysville July 19.

Playoff: Portsmouth 4 games, Maysville 1.

Player statistics
Player	Team	Stat	Tot	Player	Team	Stat	Tot
Ralph Sharman	Portsmouth	BA	.374	Hubert Test	Portsmouth	W	21
Pickles Dillhoefer	Portsmouth	Runs	83	Howard McGraner	Chil/Hunt	Pct	.800: 12–3
Ralph Sharman	Portsmouth	Hits	147	Ernie Calbert	Ironton	HR	13

1916 Ohio State League

Team standings	W	L	PCT	GB	Managers
Portsmouth Truckers	47	19	.712	-	Chet Spencer
Charleston Senators / Chillicothe Babes	29	35	.453	17	Bill Powell
Maysville Burley Cubs	26	36	.419	19	Jimmy Jones
Frankfort Old Taylors	24	35	.407	NA	Howard "Ducky" Holmes
Huntington Blue Sox	22	38	.367	NA	Charlie DeArmond /Ezra Midkiff
Lexington Colts	39	24	.619	NA	Howard Guyn

Huntington & Frankfort disbanded July 16; Charleston moved to Chillicothe July 13; Lexington disbanded July 16
The league disbanded July 19.

Player statistics
Player	Team	Stat	Tot	Player	Team	Stat	Tot
Stewart Dilts	Portsmouth	BA	.420	John Ferguson	Portsmouth	W	12
[ Stewart Dilts	Portsmouth	Runs	57	Paul Carpenter	Chil/Charl	SO	95
Stewart Dilts	Portsmouth	Hits	95	Rube Lindholm	Frankfort	HR	6

=== 1936 to 1941 ===
1936 Ohio State League

Team standings	W	L	PCT	GB	Managers
Tiffin Mud Hens	60	35	.635	-	Myles Thomas
Sandusky Sailors	51	47	.520	10½	Chappie Geygan
Fostoria Cardinals	45	50	.474	15	Harry Aldrick / George Silvey
Fremont Reds	42	56	.429	19½	Marty Purtell
New Philadelphia Red Birds	2	6	.250	NA	George Silvey
Mansfield Tigers	2	8	.200	NA	Jack Orr

Mansfield and New Philadelphia both disbanded May 26.

Player statistics
Player	Team	Stat	Tot	Player	Team	Stat	Tot
John Zipay	Fostoria	BA	.419	Edward Bastian	Tiffin	W	18
John Clements	Tiffin	Runs	97	Steve Vargo	Fostoria	SO	156
Jack Suydam	Tiffin	Hits	141	Charles Cronin	Tiffin	ERA	3.27
John Clements	Tiffin	RBI	112	John Clements	Tiffin	HR	37

1937 Ohio State League

Team standings	W	L	PCT	GB	Managers
Mansfield Red Sox	59	24	.711	-	Dewey Stover
Sandusky Sailors / Marion Presidents	61	30	.670	2	Chappie Geygan
Tiffin Mud Hens	43	38	.531	15	Emilio Palmero / Al Eckert
Findlay Browns	43	47	.478	19½	Grover Hartley
Fremont Reds	36	55	.396	27	Howard Bohl
Fostoria Red Birds	20	68	.227	41½	John Cavanaugh / Tom Jenkins / Rex Bowen / Harry Aldrick

Sandusky moved to Marion June22.

Player statistics
Player	Team	Stat	Tot	Player	Team	Stat	Tot
Dewey Stover	Mansfield	BA	.383	Gordon Mann	Sand/Mar	W	18-2
Johnny Barrett	Mansfield	Runs	97	Marion Spence	Sand/Mar	W	18
Johnny Barrett	Mansfield	Hits	129	Charles Cronin	Tiffin	SO	178
Chappie Geygan	Sand/Mar	RBI	91	Gordon Mann	Sand/Mar	ERA	2.30

1938 Ohio State League

Team standings	W	L	PCT	GB	Managers
Fostoria Red Birds	55	41	.573	-	Jack Farmer
Fremont Reds/Green Sox	51	43	.543	3	Chappie Geygan
Findlay Browns	44	54	.449	12	Grover Hartley
Tiffin Mud Hens	44	56	.440	13	Tony Rogala

Playoff: Freemont 3 games, Fostoria 0.

Player statistics
Player	Team	Stat	Tot	Player	Team	Stat	Tot
Peter Kraus	Fostoria	BA	.372	Glen Fletcher	Free/Find	W	15
Peter Kraus	Fostoria	Runs	100	Jack Farmer	Fostoria	SO	164
Peter Kraus	Fostoria	Hits	137	Frederick Berger	Fostoria	Pct	.818; 9–2
Del Wilber	Findlay	RBI	83	Chappie Geygan	Fremont	HR	18

1939 Ohio State League

Team standings	W	L	PCT	GB	Managers
Findlay Oilers	68	62	.523	-	Grover Hartley
Fremont Green Sox	66	63	.512	1½	Chappie Geygan
Fostoria Red Birds	66	63	.512	1½	Jack Farmer
Lima Pandas	64	66	.492	4	Dick Ward
Tiffin Mud Hens	64	66	.492	4	Jim Lawrence
Mansfield Braves	61	69	.469	7	Ray French

Playoff: Lima defeated Tiffin in a one-game playoff for fourth place. Freemont won 2nd place by coin toss. Findley 2 games, Fostoria 0; Lima 2 games, Fremont 1
Finals: Lima 4 games, Findlay 3;

Player statistics
Player	Team	Stat	Tot	Player	Team	Stat	Tot
Hank Edwards	Mansfield	BA	.395	Glen Fletcher	Findlay	W	22
Hank Edwards	Mansfield	Runs	135	Fred Berger	Fostoria	SO	231
Hank Edwards	Mansfield	Hits	209	Red Evans	Lima	Pct	.846; 11–2
Del Wilber	Findlay	RBI	145	Hank Edwards	Mansfield	HR	18

1940 Ohio State League

Team standings	W	L	PCT	GB	Managers
Lima Pandas	85	34	.714	-	Merle Settlemire
Findlay Oilers	70	46	.603	13½	Grover Hartley / George Ruley
Mansfield Braves	59	59	.500	25½	Dewey Strong
Tiffin Mud Hens	50	64	.429	32½	Myles Thomas
Fostoria Red Birds	44	73	.376	40	Bobby Jones
Fremont Green Sox	43	75	.364	41½	Ray Caldwell / Garland Sewell

Playoff: Lima 3 games, Mansfield 0; Findley 3 games, Tiffin 1
Finals: Lima 4 Games, Findley 2.

Player statistics
Player	Team	Stat	Tot	Player	Team	Stat	Tot
Gene Woodling	Mansfield	BA	.398	Frank Biscan	Lima	W	26
John Cindric	Lima	Runs	141	Frank Biscan	Lima	SO	243
Stanley Mazgay	Findlay	Hits	175	Merle Settlemire	Lima	Pct	.1000; 15–0
John Cindric	Lima	RBI	150				
John Cindric	Lima	HR	39				

1941 Ohio State League

Team standings	W	L	PCT	GB	Managers
Fremont Green Sox	69	34	.670	-	Chappie Geygan
Mansfield Braves	67	40	.626	4	Alex Clowson
Tiffin Mud Hens	50	55	.476	20	Charles LeCrone / Harry Taylor
Fostoria Red Birds	49	57	.462	21½	Lee Ellison / Jim Cronin
Lima Pandas	43	64	.402	28	Otis Brannan / Merle Settlemire
Findlay Browns	37	65	.363	31½	Grover Hartley

Player statistics
Player	Team	Stat	Tot	Player	Team	Stat	Tot
Johnny Gerlach	Tiffin	BA	.340	J.G. Stasaitis	Fremont	W	19
Jim Pruett	Fostoria	BA	.340	Don Bayliss	Tiffin	SO	198
Johnny Gerlach	Tiffin	Hits	137	Lloyd Fisher	Fremont	Pct	.857; 18–3
Henry Miesle	Fremont	RBI	86	Ed Mutryn	Mansfield	HR	22

No League play 1942 & 1943 due to WW II.

=== 1944 to 1947 ===
1944 Ohio State League

Team standings	W	L	PCT	GB	Managers
Springfield Giants	76	54	.585	-	Earl Wolgamot
Newark Moundsmen	71	58	.550	4½	Clay Bryant
Middletown Red Sox	66	61	.520	8½	Red Barnes
Lima Red Birds	65	62	.512	9½	Runt Marr / Leo Norris
Zanesville Dodgers	58	71	.450	17½	Jack Knight
Marion Diggers	50	80	.385	26	Grover Hartley

Playoffs: Newark 3 games, Lima 1; Middletown 3 games, Springfield 2
Finals: Newark 4 games, Middletown 2.

Player statistics
Player	Team	Stat	Tot	Player	Team	Stat	Tot
Luke Majorki	Newark	BA	.355	Ned Garver	Newark	W	21
Neal Reside	Lima	Runs	120	Ned Garver	Newark	SO	221
Neal Reside	Lima	Hits	173	Ned Garver	Newark	ERA	1.21
Harvey Zernia	Lima	RBI	114	Eddie Volan	Newark	HR	20

1945 Ohio State League

Team standings	W	L	PCT	GB	Managers
Middletown Rockets	89	50	.640	-	Ivy Griffin
Zanesville Dodgers	74	66	.529	15½	Jack Knight / Morris Mikesell / Ray Hayworth / Eric McNair / Clay Bryant
Lima Reds	72	68	.514	17½	Cap Crossley
Springfield Giants	64	75	.460	25	Earl Wolgamot
Marion Cardinals	62	77	.446	27	Grover Hartley / Wally Schang
Newark Moundsmen	57	82	.410	32	Mickey O'Neil

Playoffs: Middletown 4 games, Springfield 2; Zanesville 4 games, Lima 2
Finals: Zanesville 3 games, Middletown 2.

Player statistics
Player	Team	Stat	Tot	Player	Team	Stat	Tot
Albert Kaiser	Newark	BA	.368	Ray Janikowski	Middletown	W	25
William Scott	Middletown	Runs	113	Ray Janikowski	Middletown	SO	274
Albert Kaiser	Newark	Hits	171	Ray Janikowski	Middletown	ERA	1.71
Troy Bolick	Springfield	RBI	103	Albert Kaiser	Newark	HR	12

1946 Ohio State League

Team standings	W	L	PCT	GB	Managers
Springfield Giants	82	57	.590	-	Don Ramsey
Zanesville Dodgers	78	60	.565	3½	Clay Bryant
Richmond Roses	76	63	.547	6	Merle Settlemire
Newark Moundsmen	74	65	.532	8	Bob Boken
Lima Terriers	67	71	.486	14½	Charlie E. Moore
Marion Cardinals	63	76	.453	19	Wally Schang / Bob Kline
Dayton Indians	58	79	.423	23	Frank Parenti / Ival Goodman
Middletown Rockets	56	83	.403	26	Mike Blazo

Playoffs: Zanesville 4 games, Richmond 0; Springfield 4 games, Newark 2.
Finals: Zanesville 4 games, Springfield 2.

Player statistics
Player	Team	Stat	Tot	Player	Team	Stat	Tot
Maynard DeWitt	Zanesville	BA	.351	Hardy Holt	Zanesville	W	23
Maynard DeWitt	Zanesville	Runs	151	Merlin Williams	Lima	SO	275
Maynard DeWitt	Zanesville	Hits	187	Ewen Bryden	Springfield	ERA	2.14
Wayne Reside	Lima/Spring	RBI	118	Wayne Reside	Lima/Spring	HR	21

1947 Ohio State League

Team standings	W	L	PCT	GB	Attend	Managers
Zanesville Dodgers	89	50	.640	-	102,250	Clay Bryant
Marion Cubs	79	60	.568	10	92,088	Nelson Burbrink
Muncie Reds	75	62	.547	13	51,834	Mike Blazo
Springfield Giants	73	65	.529	15½	72,462	Don Ramsey
Richmond Roses	62	72	.463	24½	53,050	Rex Carr
Dayton Indians	62	73	.459	25	65,420	Ival Goodman
Newark Moundsmen	64	76	.457	25½	58,935	Eddie Dancisak
Lima Terriers	47	93	.336	42½	56,466	Merle Settlemire

Playoffs: Zanesville 4 games, Springfield 0; Marion 4 games, Muncie 1;
Finals: Zanesville 4 games, Marion 2.

Player statistics
Player	Team	Stat	Tot	Player	Team	Stat	Tot
Nelson Burbrink	Marion	BA	.378	Clayton Lambert	Zanesville	W	23
Robert Verrier	Richmond	Runs	127	Clayton Lambert	Zanesville	SO	232
Jack Maisch	Lima	Hits	194	Edward Post	Muncie	ERA	2.02
Ed Fowler	Newark	RBI	119	Bob Montag	Muncie	HR	14

== League records 1887–1951 ==
Batting
Player	Team	Stat	Tot	Yr	Player	Team	Stat	Tot	Yr
Bill Henry	Springfield	GA	141	1946	Joe Pattison	Springfield	GA	141	1946
John Zipay	Fostoria	BA	.419	1936	Andrew Rellick	Springfield	AB	585	1950
Marvin Stender	Marion	Runs	158	1951	Henry Edwards	Mansfield	H	209	1939
John Cindric	Lima	Rbi	150	1940	Jim Engleman	Newark	2B	62	1950
Charles Frey	Marion	3B	20	1946	Keith Jones	Richmond	3B	20	1950
John Cindric	Lima	HR	39	1940	Jim Engleman	Newark	TB	350	1950
Maynard DeWitt	Zanesville	SB	110	1946	Wayne Yoder	Springfield	BB	142	1949
Charles Hopkins	Newark	SO	136	1947					

Pitching
Player	Team	Stat	Tot	Yr	Player	Team	Stat	Tot	Yr
Joe Bielemeier	Zanesville	CG	31	1945	Richard McEvoy	Newark	G	55	1948
Ed Donalds	Portsmouth	W	30	1913	Bob Jenkins	Newark	L	19	1944
Bob McCormick	Zanesville	L	19	1945	Merle Settlemire (15–0)	Lima	Pct	1.000	1940
Walt Justis	Lancaster	SO	293	1908	Merlin Williams	Lima	IP	307	1946
Joe Bielemeier	Zanesville	ShO	7	1945	Merle Settlemire	Lima	WS	15	1940
Bob Purcell	Springfield	BB	182	1950	Ned Garver	Newark	ERA	1.21	1946

See the Ohio–Indiana League for 1948–51

== Sources ==
The Encyclopedia of Minor League Baseball; Second Edition
Image is user created not original.
