= Hamilton Mechanics =

- 1911; (1884, 1889, 1911, 1913); Hamilton, Ohio

Minor league affiliations
- Class: Independent (1884, 1889); Class D (1911, 1913)
- League: Ohio State League (1884); Tri-State League (1889); Ohio State League (1911, 1913)

Major league affiliations
- Team: None

Minor league titles
- League titles (0): None

Team data
- Name: Hamilton (1884, 1889); Hamilton Mechanics (1911); Hamilton Maroons (1913)
- Ballpark: North End Athletic Field (1911, 1913)

The Hamilton Mechanics were a minor league baseball team based in Hamilton, Ohio. Between 1884 and 1913, Hamilton teams played as members of the Ohio State League in 1884, Tri-State League in 1889 and Ohio State League in 1911 and 1913. Hamilton hosted minor league home games at the North End Athletic Field in 1911, and 1913.

== History ==
Minor league baseball was first hosted in Hamilton, Ohio in 1884, when the Hamilton team became charter members of the six–team Ohio State League. The Chillicothe Logans, Dayton Gem Citys, Ironton, Portsmouth Riversides and Springfield teams joined Hamilton in beginning 1884 league play. After three teams folded from the during the season, the Hamilton team finished the complete season in third place with a record of 26–42. Playing under managers Amos Booth and Rousseau, Hamilton finished 19.0 games behind the first place Dayton Gem Citys. The league folded following the season.

In 1889 minor league play resumed when Hamilton fielded a team as a member of the six–team Tri-State League. The Hamilton team was joined by the Canton Nadjys, Dayton Reds, Mansfield Indians, Springfield and Wheeling Nailers teams in league play. Hamilton ended the season in fifth place in the final standings. With a final record of 41–65, Hamilton was managed by D.C. Blandy and Edward Hengle, ending the season 27.0 games behind the first place Canton Nadjys. Hamilton folded from the league following the 1889 season, as the 1890 Tri–State League expanded to eight teams without a Hamilton franchise.

Minor league baseball returned to Hamilton in 1911. The Class D level Ohio State League expanded from six teams to eight teams, adding the Hamilton "Mechanics" and Springfield Reapers teams as expansion franchises. The two new teams joined the Chillicothe Infants, Lancaster Lanks, Lima Cigarmakers, Marion Diggers, Newark Newks and Portsmouth Cobblers in the 1911 Ohio State League play.

The Hamilton use of the "Mechanics" moniker corresponds to local industry and history. Buoyed by the Hamilton Hydraulic System, Hamilton, Ohio grew to become a major manufacturing center in the era, with local facilities producing numerous machines and equipment. Companies such as Hooven-Owens-Rentschler, Champion Coated Paper, Niles Tool Works, and Estate Stove were located in Hamilton, Ohio in the era.

The Hamilton Mechanics finished in last place in the 1911 Ohio State League final standings. Compiling a 48–92 record, the Mechanics placed eighth in the final standings. Managed by Jim Barton and Frank Locke, Hamilton finished 36.5 games behind the first place Springfield Reapers in the Ohio State League standings. Hamilton did not return to the 1912 Ohio State League as the league reduced to six teams.

In their final season of play, Hamilton rejoined the 1913 Ohio State League, as the league again expanded to become an eight–team league. The newly named Hamilton Maroons resumed play, with the Huntington Blue Sox joining Hamilton as an expansion franchise in the league. The Hamilton Maroons finished their final season of play in seventh place. Playing under manager Zeke Wrigley, the Maroons ended the season with a 55–79 record, finishing 29.0 games behind the first place Chillicothe Babes. The Hamilton franchise folded following the 1913 season.

Hamilton, Ohio has not hosted another minor league team. Today, Hamilton hosts the Hamilton Joes franchise of the Great Lakes Summer Collegiate League, who began play in 2015.

== The ballpark ==
The Hamilton minor league teams hoster played 1911 and 1913 minor league home games at the North End Athletic Field. The ballpark was located on Ford Boulevard (Joe Nuxhall Boulevard) between Stout Street & Poplar Street. Today, the park still in use as a public park with ballfields, renamed L.J. Smith Park. The location is 1150 Joe Nuxhall Boulevard in Hamilton, Ohio.

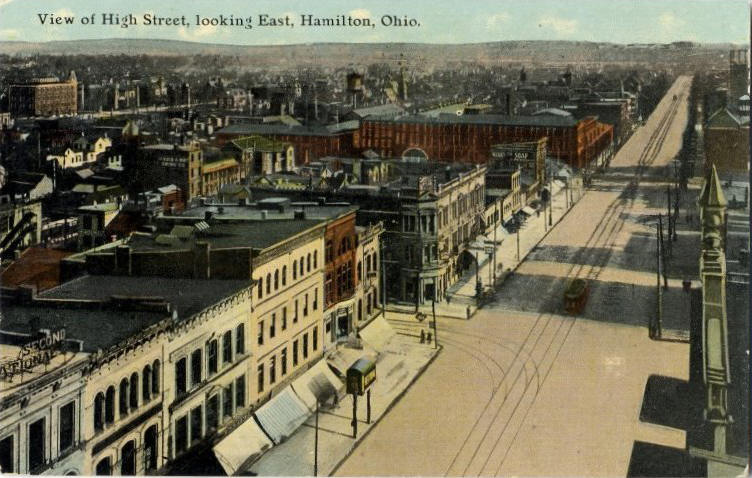
(1911) Postcard, Hamilton Main Street. Hamilton, Ohio

== Timeline ==
Year(s)	# Yrs.	Team	Level	League
1884	1	Hamilton	Independent	Ohio State League
1889	1	Hamilton	Independent	Tri-State League
1911	1	Hamilton Mechanics	Class D	Ohio State League
1913	1	Hamilton Maroons	Class D	Ohio State League

== Year-by-year records ==
Year	Record	Finish	Manager	Playoffs
1884	26–42	3rd	Amos Booth / Rousseau	No playoffs held
1889	41–65	5th	D.C. Blandy / Edward Hengle	No playoffs held
1911	48–92	8th	Jim Barton / Frank Locke	No Playoffs held
1913	55–79	7th	Zeke Wrigley	No Playoffs held

== Notable alumni ==
- Amos Booth (1884, MGR)
- Sim Bullas (1884)
- Harry Daubert (1913)
- John Dolan (1889)
- Bob Gilks (1884)
- Ed Hengel (1889)
- George Hogreiver (1889)
- Harry Huston (1913)
- Harry Kessler (1884)
- Pat Lyons (1889)
- Karl Meister (1913)
- Bobby Mitchell (1884)
- Frank Monroe (1884)
- Bill Niles (1889)
- Billy Otterson (1884)
- Joseph Roxburgh (1884)
- John Shoupe (1889)
- Alex Voss (1889)
- Podge Weihe (1889)
- George Winkleman (1884)
- Zeke Wrigley (1913, MGR)

== See also ==
Hamilton Maroons players
Hamilton (minor league baseball) players
