= Piqua Picks =

- 1911; Piqua, Ohio

Minor league affiliations
- Class: Class D (1911)
- League: Ohio State League (1911)

Major league affiliations
- Team: None

Minor league titles
- League titles (0): None

Team data
- Name: Piqua Picks (1911)
- Ballpark: Ash Street Ball Grounds (1911)

The Piqua Picks were a minor league baseball teams based in Piqua, Ohio. In 1911, the Piqua Picks played a partial season as members of the Class D level Ohio State League, joining the league during the season and hosting home games at the Ash Street Ball Grounds. Piqua finished in fifth place in the final 1911 standings, with Picks player Bert Blue winning the league batting title.

== History ==
Minor league baseball play was first hosted in Piqua, Ohio in 1911, when the Picks became members of the eight–team Class D level Ohio State League during the season. The Chillicothe Infants, Hamilton Mechanics, Lancaster Lanks, Lima Cigarmakers, Marion Diggers, Portsmouth Cobblers and Springfield Reapers joined Piqua in completing league play.

The use of the "Picks" nickname corresponds with Piqua agriculture in the era, which featured apple orchards.

The 1911 Ohio State League had expanded from six teams to eight teams. On June 22, 1911, the Newark Newks franchise moved from Newark, Ohio to Piqua, Ohio with a record of 29–33. The team compiled a 43–32 record while based in Piqua. Ending the season, the team placed fifth in the final standings with an overall record of 72–65. Playing under manager Al Newnham, the Newark/Piqua team finished 11.0 games behind the first place Springfield Reapers in the Ohio State League final standings. Piqua player Bert Blue won the Ohio State League batting title, hitting .347 with a league leading 176 total hits.

The final 1911 Ohio State League standings were led by the Springfield Reapers (84–55), followed by the Marion Diggers (80–59), Portsmouth Cobblers (78–61), Chillicothe Infants (78–62), Newark Newks/Piqua Picks (72–65), Lima Cigarmakers (62–77), Lancaster Lanks (53–84) and Hamilton Mechanics (48–92).

The 1912 Ohio State League reduced franchises to again become six–team league and the Piqua franchise did not return to league play in 1912.

Piqua, Ohio has not hosted another minor league team.

== The ballpark ==
The Piqua Picks minor league team hosted 1911 home games at the Ash Street Ball Grounds. The Piqua Baseball Company first established a playing field in the location in 1883. Later, the location was noted to have become known as Roosevelt Park. Today, the site hosts Wertz Stadium, which was a long–time football venue and now hosts soccer. The stadium location is 421 Ash Street in Piqua.

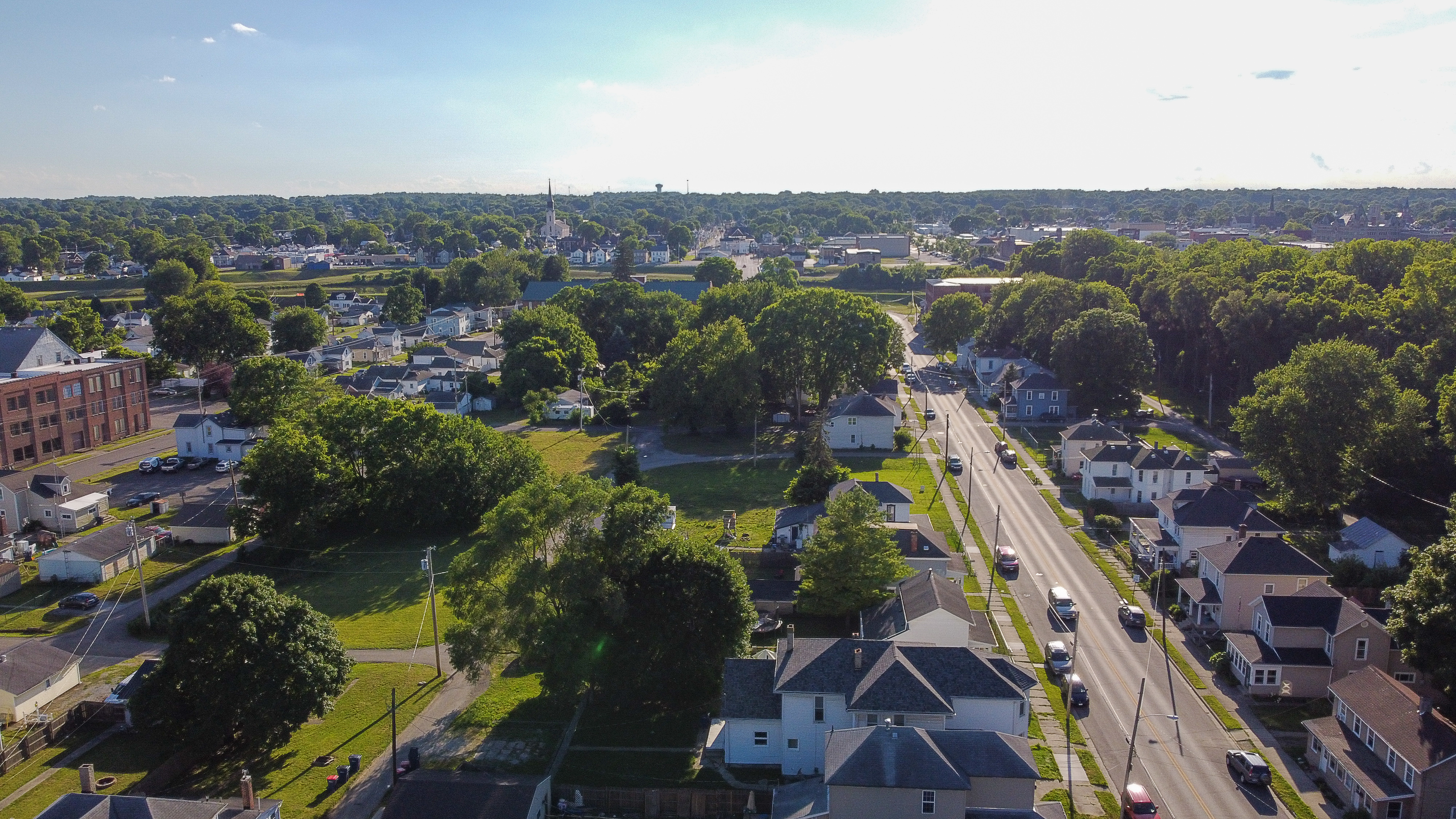
(2020) Piqua, Ohio.

== Year–by–year record ==
Year	Record	Finish	Manager	Playoffs / notes
1911	72–65	5th	Al Newnham	Newark (29–33) moved to Piqua June 22

== Notable alumni ==
- Bert Blue (1911)
- Piqua Picks players
