= Findlay, Ohio minor league baseball history =

Findlay, Ohio minor league baseball teams
- 1895–1941; (1895, 1915, 1937–1941); Findlay, Ohio

Minor league affiliations
- Class: Independent (1895); Class D (1915, 1937–1941)
- League: Interstate League (1895); Buckeye League (1915); Ohio State League (1937–1941)

Major league affiliations
- Team: St. Louis Browns (1937–1938)

Minor league titles
- League titles (0): None
- Conference titles (1): 1939
- Wild card berths (2): 1937; 1940

Team data
- Name: Findlay Sluggers (1895); Findlay Finns (1915); Findlay Browns (1937–1938); Findlay Oilers (1939–1940); Findlay Browns (1941)
- Ballpark: Findlay Base Ball Park (1895); Athletic Park (1915); Riverside Park (1937–1938); League Park (1939–1941)

Minor league baseball teams were based in Findlay, Ohio between 1895 and 1941, playing under four nicknames and hosting games in four ballparks. Findlay teams played as members of the Interstate League in 1895, Buckeye League in 1915 and Ohio State League from 1937 to 1941. The Findlay Browns were a minor league affiliate of the St. Louis Browns in 1937 and 1938. Baseball Hall of Fame member Bud Fowler played for the 1894 Findlay Sluggers.

== History ==
Organized baseball in Findlay, Ohio began with the 1894 "Findlay Sluggers," a semi–pro team, with Findlay native Home Run Johnson and Baseball Hall of Fame member Bud Fowler playing for the integrated team. Johnson reportedly hit 60 home runs for the 1894 Findlay Sluggers, earning his nickname. On September 13, 1894, the Findlay Sluggers played the Cincinnati Reds in an exhibition game, losing by the score of 10–2. On September 20, 1894, the Sluggers played the Brooklyn Bridegrooms, losing by one run. In 1895, Fowler and Home Run Johnson left Findlay to form the Page Fence Giants negro leagues team in Adrian, Michigan.

Immediately following the semi–pro Sluggers, minor league baseball first came to Findlay, Ohio in 1895. Keeping the previous moniker, the minor league Findlay Sluggers played the 1895 season as a member of the Independent level Interstate League. With a record of 32–21, Findlay placed third in the 1895 Interstate League standings. Under managers Charles Stroebel and Howard Brandenberg, Findlay finished 2.5 games behind the first place Twin Cities Hustlers in the eight–team Interstate League. Findlay folded following the 1895 season. Author Zane Grey and his brother Reddy Grey played for the Sluggers in 1895.

Professional baseball returned to Findlay in 1915. The 1915 Findlay Finns became members charter members of the Class D level Buckeye League. With a record of 22–19, the Finns placed second in the six–team league standings when the league disbanded on July 5, 1915. Playing under manager Ollie Chapman, the Finns finished 2.0 games behind the champion Lima Boosters. The Buckeye League permanently folded after playing only the partial 1915 season.

Findlay returned to minor league play in 1937, fielding a team in the Ohio State League and reaching the league finals. The "Findlay Browns" began play as an affiliate of the St. Louis Browns and Findlay would play five seasons in the Ohio State League, all under manager Grover Hartley. The 1937 Findlay Browns placed in fourth in the six–team Class D level league. With a 43–47 record under manager Grover Hartley, the Browns finished 19.5 games behind the first place Mansfield Red Sox in the final regular season standings. In the playoffs, Findlay beat the Marion Presidents 2 games to 0 before being swept by the Mansfield Red Sox 3 games to 0 in the finals.

The Ohio State League played the 1938 season as a four–team league. The Findlay Browns continued play and finished in third place. With a regular season record of 44–54 under manager Grover Hartley, Findlay was 12.0 games behind the first place Fostoria Red Birds in the regular season standings.

The Findlay Oilers won the 1939 Ohio State League pennant and made the Finals, as the league returned to a six–team league. The "Oilers" moniker was in place due to the loss of the affiliation with the St. Louis Browns, as most Ohio State League teams lost their major league affiliations. The "Oilers" moniker was in local reference to the University of Findlay, who still use the moniker today. The Findlay Oilers placed first in the regular season with an 86–62 record under Grover Hartley, finishing 1.5 games ahead of the second place Fremont Green Sox. In the playoffs Findley defeated the Fostoria Red Birds 2 games to 0 and advanced. In the Finals, the Lima Pandas 4 defeated Findlay 4 games to 3.

In the 1940 Ohio State League, the Findlay Oilers finished in second place and returned to the finals. With a record of 70–46, managed by Grover Hartley and George Ruley, the Oilers finished 13.5 games behind the first place Lima Pandas in the six–team league. In the 1940 Ohio State League playoffs, Findley defeated the Tiffin Mud Hens 3 games to 1 and advanced to their second consecutive Finals appearance. In a Finals rematch from the season before, the Lima Pandas again defeated Findley, 4 games to 2.

In their final season of play, the 1941 Findlay "Browns" placed sixth and last in the six–team Ohio State League, returning to their former moniker. With a record of 37–65 in their final season under manager Grover Hartley, Findlay finished 31.5 games behind the first place Fremont Green Sox. After the conclusion of the 1941 season, the Ohio State League ceased play until 1944 due to World War II. Findlay did not field a franchise when the Ohio State League returned to play.

Findlay, Ohio has not hosted another minor league team.

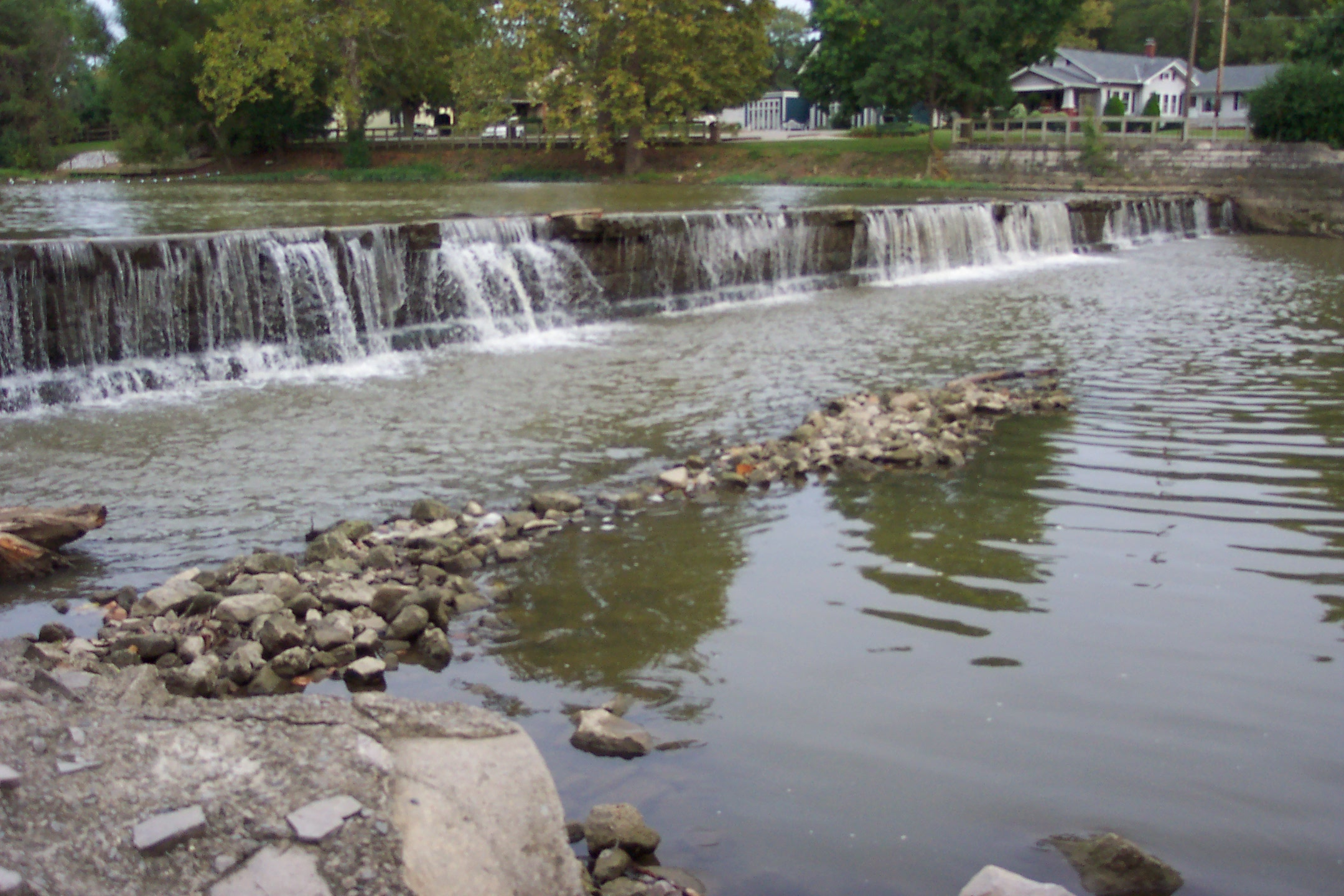
(2005) Riverside Park. Findlay, Ohio

== The ballparks ==
In 1895, the Findlay team was referenced to have played home games at the Findlay Baseball Park. Today, the park is still in use, known as Rowson Park. The park still contains baseball diamonds and is located at 720 River Street, Findlay, Ohio.

The 1915 Findlay Finns were noted to have played home games at the Athletic Park.

The 1937 and 1938 Browns teams were noted to have played home games at Riverside Park. Today, the park is still in use as a public park. The address is 231 McManness Avenue, Findlay, Ohio.

From 1939 to 1941, Findlay minor league teams were referenced to have played Ohio State League home games at League Park. The ballpark was located at 933 West Main Cross Street in Findlay, Ohio. The site is now a residential area.

== Timeline ==
Year(s)	# Yrs.	Team	Level	League	Affiliate	Ballpark
1895	1	Findlay Sluggers	Independent	Interstate League	None	Findlay Baseball Park (Rowson Park)
1915	1	Findlay Finns	Class D	Buckeye League	None	Athletic Park
1937–1938	2	Findlay Browns	Class D	Ohio State League	St. Louis Browns	Riverside Park
1939–1940	2	Findlay Oilers	Class D	Ohio State League	None	League Park
1941	1	Findlay Browns	Class D	Ohio State League	None	League Park

== Year–by–year records ==
Year	Record	Finish	Manager	Playoffs
1895	32–21	3rd	Charles Stroebel / Howard Brandenberg	No playoffs held
1915	22–19	2nd	Ollie Chapman	No playoffs held
1937	43–47	4th	Grover Hartley	Lost league finals
1938	44–54	3rd	Grover Hartley	Did not qualify
1939	86–62	1st	Grover Hartley	League Pennant; Lost league finals
1940	70–46	2nd	Grover Hartley / George Ruley	Lost league finals
1941	37–65	6th	Grover Hartley	Did not qualify

== Notable alumni ==
- Bud Fowler (1894) Elected Baseball Hall of Fame, 2021
- Frank Biscan (1938)
- Fred Cooke (1895)
- Babe Doty (1895)
- Reddy Grey (1895)
- Zane Grey (1895) Author
- Grover Hartley (1937–1941, MGR)
- Harry McCluskey (1915)
- Home Run Johnson (1894)
- Tacks Latimer (1895)
- Bill Reidy (1895)
- Dick Starr (1941)
- Del Wilber (1938–1939)
- Findlay Browns players
- Findlay Oilers players
- Findlay Sluggers players
