= Chillicothe, Ohio minor league baseball history =

Chillicothe, Ohio minor league baseball teams
- 1884–1916; (1884, 1894, 1910–1916); Chillicothe, Ohio

Minor league affiliations
- Class: Independent (1884, 1894); Class D (1910–1916)
- League: Ohio State League (1884); Tri-State League (1894); Ohio State League (1910–1916)

Major league affiliations
- Team: None

Minor league titles
- League titles (1): 1913

Team data
- Name: Chillicothe Logans (1884); Chillicothe (1894); Chillicothe Infants (1910–1912); Chillicothe Babes (1913–1916)
- Ballpark: Arch Street Park (1910–1916)

Minor league baseball teams were based in Chillicothe, Ohio between 1884 and 1916. Chillicothe teams played as members of the Ohio State League in 1884, Tri-State League in 1894 and Ohio State League from 1910 to 1916.

== History ==
Organized baseball reportedly began in Chillicothe, Ohio in 1866. A Chillicothe team was noted to have defeated the Circleville Eurekas 25–2.

Minor league baseball play was first hosted in Chillicothe, Ohio in 1884, when the Chillicothe Logans team became charter members of the Ohio State League. The Dayton Gem Citys, Hamilton, Ironton, Portsmouth Riversides and Springfield teams joined Chillicothe in 1884 league play. On August 1, 1884, the Chillicothe Logans team folded. At the time the team folded on August 1, Chillicothe had a 13–38 record playing under manager T.L. Duncan. The Dayton Gem Citys were the eventual league champions.

In 1894, Chillicothe fielded a team in the Tri-State League. The Chillicothe team was joined by the Charleston, West Virginia, Huntington, West Virginia, Circleville, Ohio, Manchester, Ohio, Portsmouth, Ohio, Jackson, Michigan and Maysville, Kentucky teams in the eight–team league. League statistics and records for the 1894 season are unknown.

In 1910, minor league baseball returned to Chillicothe, Ohio. The Chillicothe Infants became members of the reformed six–team Class D level Ohio State League. The Lancaster Lanks, Lima Cigarmakers, Marion Diggers, Newark Newks and Portsmouth Cobblers joined Chillicothe as league members.

On May 5, 1910, Chillicothe hosted their home opener at "League Park." The ballpark grandstands reportedly caught fire due to a cigarette and burned completely, with no injuries reported. It was reported the team then moved home games to "Kite Track." The League Park grandstands were eventually rebuilt for the 1911 season.

In 1910 league play the Chillicothe Infants finished last in the six–team Ohio State League standings. With a record of 52–85, the Infants placed sixth in the final standings, playing the season under managers Frank Grubb and Tom Kibler. Chillicothe finished 33.5 games behind the first place Portsmouth Cobblers.

1911 Ohio State League expanded from six teams to eight teams. The Chillicothe Infants placed fourth in the final standings with a record of 78–62. Playing under manager Zeke Wrigley, the Infants finished 6.5 games behind the first place Springfield Reapers in the Ohio State League standings.

The Chillicothe Infants team finished last in the 1912 six–team Ohio State League. The Infants ended the Ohio State League season with an overall regular season record of 57–77, managed by Jesse Tannehill, Ray Ryan and Al Newnham. Chillicothe finished 24.5 games behind the place first place Portsmouth Cobblers in the final regular season standings.

As the 1913 Ohio State League expanded and became an eight–team league, the newly named Chillicothe "Babes" won the league championship. Chillicothe placed first in the 1913 season standings with a 83–49 record, playing under returning manager Al Newnham. The Babes finished the season mere percentage points (.629 to .627) ahead of the second place Charleston Senators (84–50) in the final standings to win the championship. Charleston began the final day of the season 2.0 games behind Chillicothe and reportedly won a double–header on the final day against Maysville, while Chillicothe lost a double–header to Portsmouth to put the teams even in the standings. Charleston was noted to have hosted a premature banquet to celebrate a championship Eventually, the Chillicothe championship was reportedly confirmed at the league meeting, held in Huntington, West Virginia on October 22, 1913. Frank Nesser of Chillicothe led the Ohio State in total hits with 178.

The 1914 Chillicothe Babes finished in third place for the Ohio state League season, as the league began the season as an eight–team league and had four franchises fold during the season. Chillicothe ended the 1914 season with a 44–73 record, playing under returning manager Al Newham. Chillicothe finished 12.0 games behind the 1st place Portsmouth Cobblers in the final standings, as Ironton Nailers, Huntington Blue Sox, Maysville Angels and Newport Newks/Paris teams folding during the season.

the 1915 Chillicothe Babes began play the six–team Ohio State League but relocated during the season. On July 13, 1913, Chillicothe relocated and moved to Huntington, West Virginia with a record of 27–34. After a 2–4 record in Huntington, the franchise relocated to Maysville, Kentucky on July 19, 1915, finishing the season as the Maysville Angels. Overall, the team had a record of 58–55 and placed third in the Ohio State League final standings, playing under manager Josh Devore in all three locations. His major league playing career having just ended, Devore had reportedly bought stock in the Chillicothe franchise in 1915 and had agreed to manage and play for the team. Devore was noted to have lived in Chillicothe, Ohio for the remainder of his life. The Chillicothe/Huntsville/Maysville team finished 13.0 games behind the first place Portsmouth Cobblers. The Maysville Burley Cubs continued play in the 1916 Ohio State League.

In their final season of play, the 1916 Chillicothe Babes briefly rejoined the Ohio State League during the season. On July 13, 1916, the Charleston Senators franchise relocated to Chillicothe with a record of 24–34. On July 18, 1916, the Ohio State League folded. After compiling a record of 5–1 based in Chillicothe, the Charleston/Chillicothe team ended the season in third place with an overall record of 29–35. Playing under manager Watt Powell in both locations, the combined team finished 17.0 games behind the first place Portsmouth Truckers in the final Standings. The Ohio State did not return to play in the 1917 season.

Chillicothe, Ohio next hosted minor league baseball in 1993, when the Chillicothe Paints franchise began play as members of the Independent level Frontier League.

== The ballpark ==
The Chillicothe minor league teams reportedly played 1910 to 1916 home games at Arch Street Park. The ballpark was noted to have been located off of Arch Street, near Allen Avenue & Vine, Chillicothe, Ohio. References indicate the ballpark of 1910 was called "League Park" and burned to the ground on opening day of May 5, 1910, with the team moving home games in 1910 to the "Kite Track." The League Park ballpark was rebuilt for the 1911 season at a cost of $5,000. The ballpark location later became Herrnstein Field and eventually the Obadiah Harris & Family Athletic Complex.

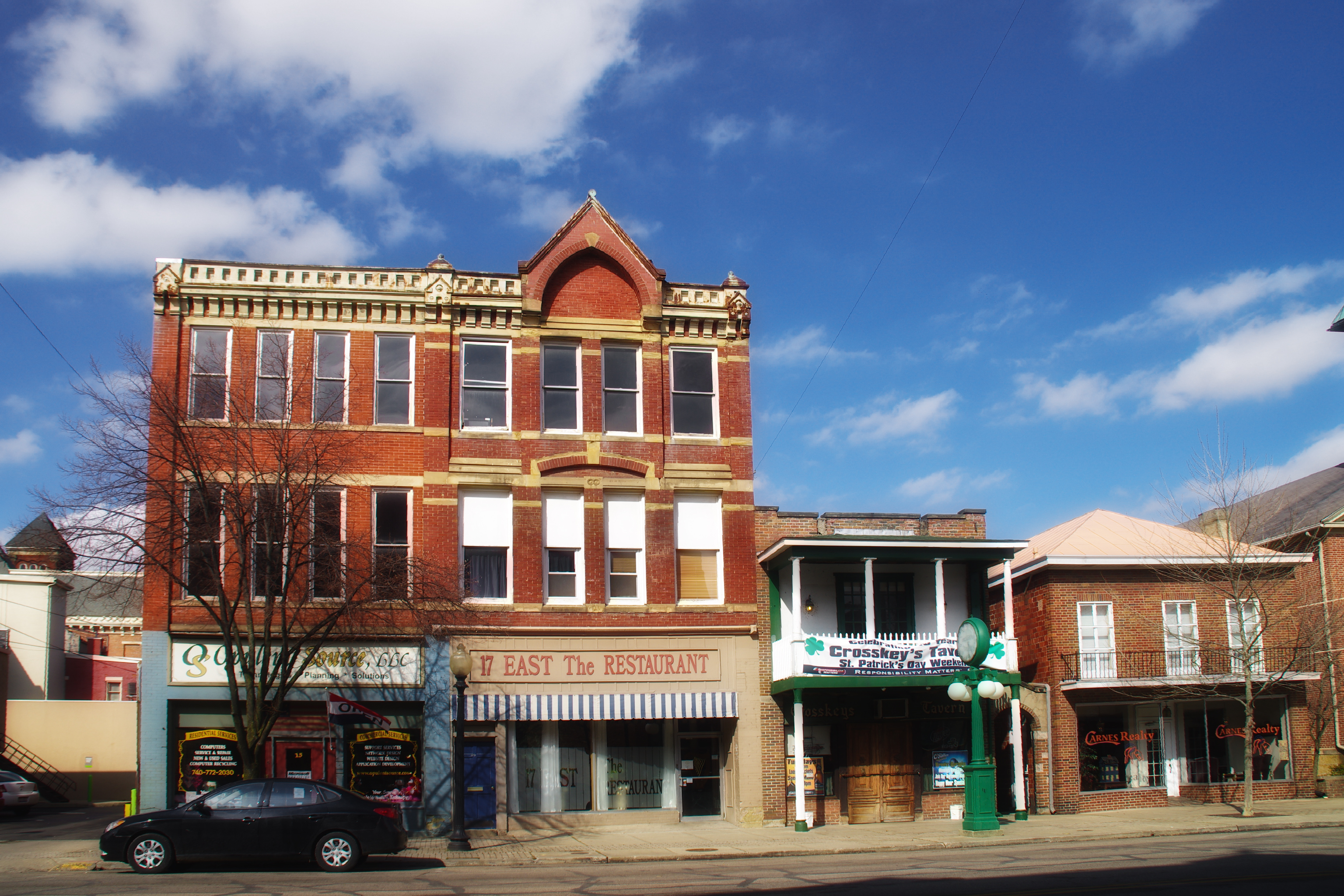
(2013) Chillicothe Business District. National Register of Historic Places. Chillicothe, Ohio.

== Timeline ==
Year(s)	# Yrs.	Team	Level	League
1884	1	Chillicothe Logans	Independent	Ohio State League
1894	1	Chillicothe	Independent	Tri-State League
1910–1912	3	Chillicothe Infants	Class D	Ohio State League
1913–1916	4	Chillicothe Babes	Class D	Ohio State League

== Year-by-year records ==
Year	Record	Finish	Manager	Playoffs
1884	13–38	NA	T.L. Duncan	Team folded August 1
1894	00–00	NA	NA	1884 league records unknown
1910	52–85	6th	Frank Grubb / Tom Kibler	No playoffs held
1911	78–62	4th	Zeke Wrigley	No playoffs held
1912	57–77	6th	Jesse Tannehill; Ray Ryan / Al Newnham	No playoffs held
1913	83–749	1st	Al Newnham	League champions
1914	73–64	3rd	Al Newnham	No payoffs held
1915	58–55	3rd	Josh Devore	Chillicothe (27–34) moved to Huntington July 13; Huntington (2–4) moved to Maysville July 19
1916	29–35	3rd	Watt Powell	Charleston (24–34) moved to Chillicothe July 13; League folded July 18

== Notable alumni ==
- Al Bauer (1884)
- Bruno Betzel (1911)
- Hank DeBerry (1915)
- Josh Devore (1915, MGR)
- Frank Emmer (1915)
- Harry Huston (1913)
- Ed Irwin (1910)
- Tom Kibler (1910, MGR), (1911–1912)
- George McVey (1884)
- Howard McGraner (1911, 1915)
- Frank Nesser (1913–1914)
- John Potts (1910)
- Ray Ryan (1912, MGR)
- John Shovlin (1913–1914)
- John Singleton (1915)
- Jesse Tannehill (1912, MGR) 1901 NL ERA Leader
- Zeke Wrigley (1911, MGR)
- Matt Zeiser (1915)
- Ed Zmich (1911)
- Chillicothe Logans players
- Chillicothe Babes players
- Chillicothe Infants players
