= Lima Pandas =

- 1939–1941; (1939-1941, 1944-1947); Lima, Ohio

Minor league affiliations
- Class: Class D (1939-1941, 1944-1947)
- League: Ohio State League (1939-1941, 1944-1947)

Major league affiliations
- Team: St. Louis Cardinals (1944); Cincinnati Reds (1945); Chicago White Sox (1946–1947)

Minor league titles
- League titles (2): 1939; 1940
- Conference titles (1): 1940
- Wild card berths (3): 1939; 1944; 1945

Team data
- Name: Lima Pandas (1939-1941); Lima Red Birds (1944); Lima Reds (1945); Lima Terriers (1946–1947)
- Ballpark: Allen County Park (1939-1941, 1944-1947)

The Lima Pandas were a minor league baseball team based in Lima, Ohio. From 1939 to 1941 and 1944 to 1947, with the interruption due to World War II, Lima teams played exclusively as members of the Class D level Ohio State League, with the Pandas winning the 1939 and 1940 league championships. The franchise played as a minor league affiliate of the St. Louis Cardinals in 1944, Cincinnati Reds in 1945 and Chicago White Sox in 1946 to 1947, with the team adopting new monikers during the affiliate seasons. The Lima Ohio State League teams hosted home minor league games at Allen County Park.

== History ==
=== Ohio State League 1939 to 1941 ===
After Lima first hosted a minor league team in 1888, the Lima Pandas were preceded in minor league play by the 1934 Lima Buckeyes, who played briefly as members of the Class D level Central League. The Buckeyes folded after compiling an 0–8 record to begin the season.

The 1939 Lima Pandas resumed minor league baseball play as members of the six–team Class D level Ohio State League. The Findlay Oilers, Fostoria Cardinals, Fremont Green Sox, Mansfield Indians and Tiffin Mud Hens joined Lima in beginning Ohio State League play on May 3, 1939.

The "Pandas" nickname was chosen by the club with fan input. The Lima franchise was formed with the support of Henry Rigney and Michael V. DiSalle, businessmen from Toledo, Ohio. DiSalle was later elected as Governor of Ohio in 1958. In February, 1939 the Lima club was approved at a league meeting in Fostoria, Ohio.

At a home game in May 1939, Lima pitcher Frank Biscan married Lilly Jane Pearson at home plate before a Pandas ballgame. Biscan then pitched a complete game shoutout against the Tiffin Mud Hens in the game to follow.

After the Pandas ended the month May in last place with a 5–12 record, manager William Ward, was replaced in by Merle “Lefty” Settlemire. By the end of June, the almost entire player roster was replaced, with the exception of three players

Beginning play in the 1939 Ohio State League, the Lima Pandas won the league championship with a playoff run. Lima ended the regular season in a fourth place tie with a 64–66 record, the identical record as the Tiffin Mud Hens. Lima played the season under managers William Ward and Merle Settlemire, finishing 4.0 games behind the first place Findlay Oilers in the final Ohio State League regular season standings. Lima first won the one game playoff with Tiffin to break the fourth place tie and advance to the four-team playoffs. In the first round, the Pandas defeated the Fremont Green Sox two games to one. In the Finals, Lima defeated the Findlay Oilers in seven games to win the championship. Hubert Wooton led the Ohio State League with 18 home runs

The Lima Pandas defended their league championship in the 1940 Ohio State League, winning the league pennant and overall championship. With an 85–34 regular season record under returning manager Merle Settlemire, the Pandas won the league pennant. Lima finished the season 17½ games ahead of the second place Findlay Oilers in the six-team league. In the playoffs, Lima swept the Mansfield Braves in three games to advance. In the Finals the Pandas defended their title in defeating the Findlay Oilers four games to two and winning their second consecutive league championship. Lima had numerous players lead the Ohio State League in various Categories. John Cindric had 39 home runs and 150 RBI to lead the league, while scoring 141 total runs, tops in the league. Player/manager Merle Settlemire had a 15–0 record, while Frank Biscan led the league with both 26 wins and 243 strikeouts.

In 1941, the Lima championship streak ended, as the team finished in fifth place and the Fremont Green Sox won the Ohio State League Championship. With a record of 43–64 record, playing the season under managers Otis Brannan and Rex Settlemire, Lima finished the regular season in fifth place, as the league held no playoffs. Lima ended the season 28.0 games behind the first place Fremont Green Sox in the final standings.

=== Ohio State League 1944 to 1947 ===
Lima continued minor league baseball play in 1944, when the Lima "Red Birds" resumed play as members of the six–team Class D level Ohio State League, which reformed during World War II. The Marion Diggers, Middletown Red Sox, Newark Moundsmen, Richmond Roses Springfield Giants and Zanesville Dodgers joined Lima in resuming league play on May 2, 1944.

The Lima Red Birds were a minor league affiliate of the St. Louis Cardinals, adopting a version of the team's nickname. The Red Birds ended the Ohio State League season with a record of 65–62, placing fourth in the regular season standings, finishing 9½ games ahead of the first place Springfield Giants, as Runt Marr and Jack Norris served as managers. In the playoffs, Lima lost in the first round to the Newark Moundsmen, who defeated the Red Birds three games to one. Harvey Zernia of Lima led the Ohio State League with 114 RBI, while teammate Neal Reside had 173 total hits and scored 120 runs to top the league in both categories.

Lima became a minor league affiliate of the Cincinnati Reds in 1945 and the Lima "Reds" qualified for the 1945 Ohio State League playoffs. With a record of 72–68, the Reds placed third in the six–team league, playing the season under manager Clarence Crossley and finishing 17½ games behind the first place Middletown Rockets in the regular season final standings. In the first round of the playoffs, Lima lost to the eventual champion Zanesville Dodgers four games to two. At age 16 Joe Nuxhall pitched for Lima in 1945, compiling a 1–5 record with a 2.57 ERA, after having pitched in the major leagues in 1944 for the Cincinnati Reds at age 15.

In 1946, Lima became a minor league affiliate of the Chicago White Sox, playing as the Lima "Terriers" in continuing Ohio State League play as the league expanded from six teams to eight teams. The Terriers finished the regular season with a record of 67–71, placing fifth in the Ohio State League, finishing 14½ games behind the first place Springfield Giants in the final regular season standings. With their fifth-place finish, Lima did not qualify for the four-team playoff won by the Zanesville Dodgers. Wayne Reside, who also played for Springfield during the season, led the Ohio State League with both 21 home runs and 118 RBI. Lima pitcher Merlin Williams had 275 strikeouts to lead the league.

In the final season of Ohio State League play, the 1947 Lima Terriers finished last in the eight-team league. Merle Settlemire, who led Lima to two championships in 1939 and 1940, returned as manager. The Terriers continued play as a Chicago White Sox minor league affiliate and ended the 1947 regular season with a record of 47–93, finishing 42½ games behind the first place Zanesville Dodgers. Lima did not qualify for the four-team playoffs, won by Zanesville.

The 1948 Lima "Terriers" continued play in a newly named league and finished last in the standings. In 1948, the Ohio State League expanded beyond the state of Ohio and changed names to become the Class D level Ohio–Indiana League In 1949, Lima continued Ohio–Indiana League play as the Lima Chiefs.

== The ballpark ==
Lima hosted home minor league games at Allen County Park, known as Halloran Park in the era. With a capacity of 3,750, the ballpark had field dimensions of (left–center–right) of 325–425–295. The ballpark was located at 1920 Slabtown Road. Today, the site houses the Allen County Educational Services organization facility, at the same address location. The adjacent public park is called the Allen County Farm Park, located at 1582 Slabtown Road.

== Timeline ==
Year(s)	# Yrs.	Team	Level	League	Affiliate	Ballpark
1939–1941	3	Lima Pandas	Class D	Ohio State League	None	Allen County Park
1944	1	Lima Red Birds	Class D	Ohio State League	St. Louis Cardinals	Allen County Park
1945	1	Lima Reds	Class D	Ohio State League	Cincinnati Reds	Allen County Park
1946-1947	2	Lima Terriers	Class D	Ohio State League	Chicago White Sox	Allen County Park
1948	1	Lima Terriers	Ohio-Indiana League	Ohio State League	None	Allen County Park

== Year–by–year records ==
Year	Record	Finish	Manager	Playoffs/notes
1939	64–66	4th (tie)	William Ward / Merle Settlemire	League champions
1940	85–34	1st	Merle Settlemire	League champions
1941	43–64	5th	Otis Brannan / Rex Settlemire	No playoffs held
1944	65–62	4th	Runt Marr / Jack Norris	Lost in 1st round
1945	72–68	3rd	Clarence Crossley	Lost in 1st round
1946	67–71	4th	Charles Moore	No playoffs held
1947	47–93	8th	Merle Settlemire	Did not qualify

== Notable alumni ==
- Frank Biscan (1939–1940)
- Mike Blyzka (1947)
- Bob Habenicht (1944)
- Johnny Klippstein (1944)
- Kurt Krieger (1944)
- Russ Kerns (1941)
- Dale Long (1945) MLB All-Star
- Runt Marr (1944, MGR)
- Joe Nuxhall (1945) 2x MLB All-Star; Cincinnati Reds Hall of Fame
- Merle Settlemire (1939–1940, 1947, MGR)
- Dick Strahs (1947)
- Ralph Weigel (1940)

== See also ==
- Lima Terriers players
- Lima Pandas players
- Lima Reds players
- Lima Red Birds players
