= Marion Cardinals =

- 1945–1946; (1944-1946); Marion, Ohio

Minor league affiliations
- Class: Class D (1944-1946)
- League: Ohio State League (1944-1946)

Major league affiliations
- Team: Chicago Cubs (1944); St.Louis Cardinals (1945-1946)

Minor league titles
- League titles (0): None
- Wild card berths (0): None

Team data
- Name: Marion Diggers (1944); Marion Cardinas (1945–1946)
- Ballpark: Lincoln Park (1944-1946)

The Marion Cardinals were a minor league baseball team based in Marion, Ohio. From 1944 to 1947, Marion teams played exclusively as members of the Class D level Ohio State League, failing to qualify for the playoffs in each season. The "Cardinals" played as a minor league affiliate of the St. Louis Cardinals in 1945 and 1946, after the 1944 Marion "Diggers" played as a Chicago Cubs affiliate.

The Marion Ohio State League teams hosted home minor league games at Lincoln Park, which is still in use today.

== History ==
Marion, Ohio first hosted a minor league team in 1900, when the Marion "Glass Blowers" played a partial season The Marion Diggers were preceded in minor league play by the 1937 Marion Presidents, who played briefly as members of the Class D level Ohio State League.

After a six season hiatus, Marion resumed minor league baseball play in 1944, when the 'Marion Diggers" revived a former nickname and began play as members of the six–team Class D level Ohio State League. The league resumed play during World War II. The Diggers were a minor league affiliate of the Chicago Cubs. The Lima Red Birds, Middletown Red Sox, Newark Moundsmen, Richmond Roses, Springfield Giants and Zanesville Dodgers teams joined with Marion in beginning league play on May 2, 1944.

The Diggers ended the 1944 Ohio State League season in last place. With a record of 50–80, Marion placed sixth in the regular season standings, finishing 26.0 games behind the first place Springfield Giants, as Grover Hartley served as manager. Marion did not qualify for the four-team playoffs, won by the Newark Mondsmen.

In 1945, Marion became a minor league affiliate of the St. Louis Cardinals, playing as the Marion "Cardinals" in continuing Ohio State League play. With a record of 62–77, the Cardinals placed fifth in the six–team league, playing the season under returning manager Grover Hartley and Wally Schang. Marion finished 27.0 games behind the first place Middletown Rockets in the regular season final standings. Marion did not qualify for the playoffs, won by the Zanesville Dodgers.

In 1946, the Marion Cardinals continued as a minor league affiliate of the St. Louis Cardinals, as the Ohio State League expanded from six teams to eight teams. The Cardinals finished the regular season with a record of 63–76, placing sixth in the Ohio State League final regular season standings. Marion finished 17.0 games behind the first place Springfield Giants in the final regular season standings. With their fifth-place finish, the Cardinals did not qualify for the four-team playoff won by the Zanesville Dodgers.

In the final season of Ohio State League play, the 1947 Marion Cubs continued play, as the franchise returned to being a minor league affiliate of the Chicago Cubs. The Cubs continued play as the Ohio State evolved into the Ohio-Indiana League in 1948.

== The ballpark ==
The Marion Ohio State League teams hosted home minor league games at Lincoln Park. The 1915 Marion Senators were the first Marion minor league team to play in Lincoln Park and the ballpark hosted all of the remaining Marion minor league teams through 1951. The ballpark had a capacity of 3,000 with field dimensions of (Left, Center, Right): 325-456-325. The ballpark was located at West Fairground Street & Oak Street. Today, Lincoln Park is still in use as a public park with an aquatic center, 12 baseball fields and other amenities on 79 acres. It is located at 879 North Prospect Street.

== Timeline ==
| Year(s) | # Yrs. | Team | Level | League | Affiliate | Ballpark |
|---|---|---|---|---|---|---|
| 1944 | 1 | Marion Diggers | Class D | Ohio State League | Chicago Cubs | Lincoln Park |
| 1945-1946 | 2 | Marion Cardinals | Class D | Ohio State League | St. Louis Cardinals | Lincoln Park |

== Year–by–year records ==
| Year | Record | Finish | Manager | Playoffs/notes |
|---|---|---|---|---|
| 1944 | 50–80 | 6th | Grover Hartley | Did not qualify |
| 1945 | 62–77 | 5th | Grover Hartley / Wally Schang | Did not qualify |
| 1946 | 63–76 | 6th | Wally Schang / Bob Kline | Did not qualify |

== Notable alumni ==
- Don Carlsen (1944)
- Grover Hartley (1944-1945, MGR)
- Bob Kline (1946, MGR)
- Vern Rapp (1946)
- Wally Schang (1945-1946, MGR)

== See also ==
- Marion Diggers players
- Marion Cardinals players
