= Lima Cigarmakers =

Minor league baseball team in Ohio

- 1908–1912; (1908–1912, 1915); Lima, Ohio

Minor league affiliations
- Class: Class D (1908–1912)
- League: Ohio State League (1908–1912); Buckeye League (1915)

Major league affiliations
- Team: None

Minor league titles
- League titles (1): 1909; 1915

Team data
- Name: Lima Cigarmakers (1908–1912); Lima Boosters (1915)
- Ballpark: San Felice Park (1908–1912, 1915)

The Lima Cigarmakers were a minor league baseball team based in Lima, Ohio. From 1908 to 1912, the Cigarmakers played as members of the Class D level Ohio State League, winning the 1909 league championship. The Lima "Boosters" played as members of the 1915 Buckeye League, winning the league championship in a shortened season.

The Cigarmakers and Boosters teams hosted home minor league games at San Felice Park in Lima. San Felice was a cigar brand in the era that was manufactured in the region.

== History ==
=== Early minor league teams ===
Lima first hosted minor league baseball in 1888, when the Lima "Lushers" played the season as members of independent Tri-State League, winning the league championship. The Cigarmakers were immediately preceded in minor league play by the 1905 and 1906 Lima Lees, who played as members of the Class C level Interstate Association. Lima did not field a minor league team in 1907 before resuming play in a new league in 1908.

=== 1908 to 1912 - Ohio State League ===
In 1908, the Lima "Cigarmakers" began play as members of the six-team, Class D level Ohio State League, which reformed after having last played in 1898. The Lancaster Lanks, Mansfield Pioneers, Marion Diggers, Newark Newks and Springfield Reapers teams joined Lima in beginning league play on April 23, 1908.

The "Cigarmakers" nickname corresponds with the cigarmaking industry in Lima in the era, which included the Deisel-Wemmer-Gilbert cigar factory. In addition, the team hosted home games at San Felice Park, with San Felice being a brand of cigars manufactured in the region in the era.

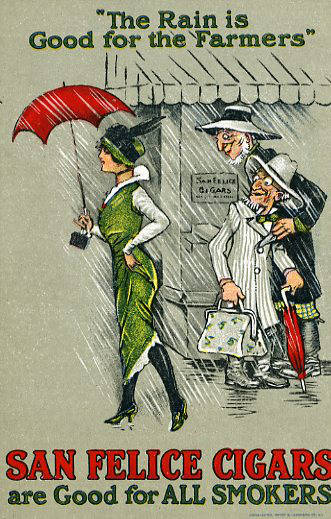
(1910-1919) San Felice Cigars advertisement. The Lima Cigarmakers played home games at San Felice Field.

In their first season of play, the Cigarmakers placed second in the six–team Ohio State League. Lima ended the Ohio State League season with an overall regular season record of 80–67, managed by Jim Jackson and Nick Kahl. The Cigarmakers finished 11.0 games behind the place first place Lancaster Lanks in the final regular season standings, as the league held no playoffs. Lima pitcher Charles Pickett, led the league with a 21–7 record, while Frank Foutz led the league with 12 home runs and Duke Reilley had 80 stolen bases, tops in the league.

The Lima Cigarmakers were the 1909 Ohio State League champions. The Cigarmakers placed first in the standings with a 79–50 record, playing under manager Lee Fohl. Lima finished 8½ games ahead of the second place Marion Diggers in the final standings. The Cigarmakers had numerous league leaders on their 1909 roster, as Charles Fink led the league with 91 runs scored and Duke Reilley led the league in stolen bases for the second consecutive season, stealing 76. Lima pitcher Robert Nelson won .800 of his games to lead the league.

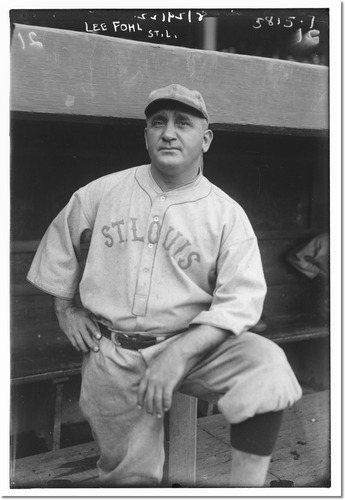
(1922) Lee Fohl, manager St. Louis Browns. Fohl managed the 1909 Lima Cigarmakers to the league championship.

Lima championship player/manager Lee Fohl went on to a brief major league playing career as a catcher. Beginning in 1915, Fohl served as a major league manager for the Cleveland Indians for five seasons. He later managed the St. Louis Browns and Boston Red Sox, while serving as a major league manager through the 1926 season.

The Cigarmakers continued play Ohio state League play in the 1910 season, as Lima finished second in the standings. With a record of 82–52, the Cigarmakers finished 4.0 games behind the first place Portsmouth Cobblers in the six-team league final standings. Al Newham served as the Lima manager.Frank Nesser of Lima was the league home run champion, hitting six, while pitcher Henry Lloyd led the league with a 10–3 record.

In 1911, the Lima Cigarmakers, played in an expanded Ohio State League, placing sixth in the eight-team league. Lima ended the season with a 62–77 record playing the season under the direction of player/manager Frank Nesser. The Cigarmakers finished 22.0 games behind the first place Springfield Reapers in the final standings.

Player/manager Frank Nesser was also a professional football player who played six seasons in the early National Football League. Along with six of his brothers they all played professional football, known as the Nesser brothers.

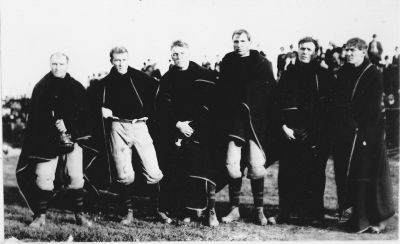
(1920) The Nesser Brothers. (L–R) Ted, John, Frank, Fred, Phil, Al.

In their final season of play as the "Cigarmakers," the 1912 Lima Cigars continued play as the Ohio State League reduced teams and returned to a six–team league. playing under manager Zeke Wrigley, Lima ended the season with a record of 64–73. Lima finished 25½ games behind the first place Portsmouth Cobblers. Frank Nesser of Lima led the Ohio State League with 170 total hits.

Lima did not return to play in the 1913 Ohio State League, as the league expanded to eight teams and added four new franchises.

=== 1915 - Buckeye League ===
Lima, Ohio did not host a minor league team in the 1914 season. Lima resumed minor league play, when the 1915 Lima "Boosters" played the season as charter members of the Class D level Buckeye League and won the league championship in a shortened season. The 1915 Buckeye League formed as six–team league and began play on May 19, 1915. The Akron Rubbermen, Canton Giants, Findlay Finns, Marion Senators and Newark New Socks teams joined Lima in league play.

On June 11, 1915, both the Marion Senators and Canton Giants teams disbanded, leaving the Buckeye League with four remaining teams. After continuing the season, the league permanently disbanded on July 5, 1915. The league folding corresponded to World War I efforts that affected many minor leagues.

The Lima Boosters, with a record of 25–18, were in first place when the Buckeye League folded on July 5, 1915. Lima was managed by Sandy Murray and finished 2.0 games ahead of second place Findlay. In the final standings, Lima and Findlay (22–19) were followed by the Akron Rubbermen (22–21) and Newark New Socks (14–24) in the final standings. The Marion Senators had a record of 10–5 and the Canton Giants were 5–11 when they both folded on June 11, 1915. Lima player/manager Sandy Murray was leading the Buckeye League with 52 total hits and teammate Bill Reynolds had a league leading 116 strikeouts when the league folded.

The Buckeye League never reformed a minor league after folding in 1915. Lima did not host minor league baseball for over twenty years and resumed play in 1939, when the Lima Pandas rejoined the Ohio State League. The Lima franchise played another tenure of eleven seasons in the league.

== The ballpark ==
The Lima Cigarmakers and Boosters teams both hosted minor league home games at San Felice Park. San Felice Park corresponds with "San Felice" being a brand of cigars manufactured in the region in the era, produced in the Diesel-Wemmer cigar company located in Lima. In the era, the ballpark was located on West Grand Avenue, near North McDonel Street in Lima, Ohio. Today, the former ballpark location is residential.

== Timeline ==
Year(s)	# Yrs.	Team	Level	League	Ballpark
1908-1912	5	Lima Cigarmakers	Class D	Ohio State League	San Felice Park
1915	1	Lima Boosters	Class D	Buckeye League	San Felice Park

== Year-by-year records ==
Year	Record	Finish	Manager	Playoffs
1908	80–67	2nd	Jim Jackson / Nick Kahl	No playoffs held
1909	79–50	1st	Lee Fohl	League champions No playoffs held
1910	82–56	2nd	Al Newham	No playoffs held
1911	62–77	6th	Frank Nesser	No playoffs held
1912	64–73	5th	Zeke Wrigley	No playoffs held
1915	25–18	5th	Sandy Murray	League champions League folded July 5

== Notable alumni ==
- Harry Daubert (1912)
- Ed Donalds (1911)
- Lee Fohl (1909, MGR)
- Frank Foutz (1908-1909)
- Lefty Houtz (1910-1911)
- Jim Jackson (1908, MGR)
- Pete Johns (1909)
- Nick Kahl (1908, MGR)
- George Kahler (1909)
- Fred Link (1908)
- Ray Miller (1909)
- Frank Nesser (1910; 1911, MGR; 1912)
- Jiggs Parson (1908)
- Charlie Pickett (1908-1909)
- Duke Reilley (1908-1909)
- Al Schweitzer (1915)
- George Textor (1910)
- Zeke Wrigley (1912, MGR)

== See also ==
- Lima Cigarmakers players
