= Portsmouth Cobblers =

- 1908–1915; Portsmouth, Ohio

Minor league affiliations
- Class: Class D (1908–1915)
- League: Ohio State League (1908–1915)

Major league affiliations
- Team: None

Minor league titles
- League titles (4): 1910; 1912; 1914; 1915
- Conference titles (2): 1912; 1915

Team data
- Name: Portsmouth Cobblers (1913–1915)
- Ballpark: Millbrook Park (1911–1916)

The Portsmouth Cobblers were a minor league baseball team based in Portsmouth, Ohio. From 1908 to 1915, the Cobblers played exclusively as members of the Class D level Ohio State League, winning league championships in 1910, 1912, 1914 and 1915.

The Cobblers hosted home games at Millbrook Park and were immediately succeeded by the 1916 Portsmouth Truckers who won the Ohio State League championship.

The "Cobblers" nickname was in reference to the large shoe industry in Portsmouth in the era.

In 1913, Portsmouth hosted an exhibition game against the Chicago Cubs.

Baseball Hall of Fame member Billy Southworth began his professional career with the 1912 and 1913 Cobblers.

== History ==
=== 1908 to 1911: Ohio State League ===
Organized baseball in Portsmouth can be traced to 1868, when the "Riverside club" amateur baseball team was formed in Portsmouth. The Cobblers were preceded in minor league baseball by the 1884 Portsmouth Riversides, who played the season as members of the Ohio State League, playing under manager Daniel Spry.

In 1908, Portsmouth resumed minor league play, when the city gained a franchise in the middle of the Ohio State League season. On June 16, 1908, the Springfield Reapers franchise moved to Portsmouth. Springfield had a 17–30 record at the time of the move. Portsmouth joined the Lancaster Lanks, Lima Cigarmakers, Mansfield Pioneers, Marion Diggers and Newark Newks in Ohio State League play, which began scheduled games on April 23, 1908.

Portsmouth was once known as "The Shoe Capital of the World." The Portsmouth use of the "Cobblers" nickname for the team corresponded to the large shoe industry in Portsmouth in the era, with numerous shoe manufacturing companies based in Portsmouth.

Finishing the 1908 season with a 29–73 record after being based in Portsmouth, the Springfield/Portsmouth "Cobblers" finished last in the Ohio State League final standings. The team ended the 1908 season with an overall record of 46–103, as Ned Ransick and R. Quinn served as managers. The Cobblers finished the season 46.0 games behind first place Lancaster.

In their second season of play, the 1909 Portsmouth Cobblers placed fourth in the six–team Ohio State League standings. The Cobblers ended the 1909 season with a record of 48–76, as Jack McCallister, Billy Doyle, and Charley O'Day served as managers during the season.

In 1910, the Portsmouth Cobblers won their first Ohio State League championship. The Cobblers ended the 1910 season with a record of 86-52, placing first in the Ohio State League standings as Pete Childs served as manager, a position he would hold for five seasons. Portsmouth finished 4.0 games ahead of the second place Lima Cigar Makers in the six–team league. Portsmouth's Frank O'Day won the Ohio State League batting championship, hitting .324.

1910 Portsmouth player Ed Irwin died in 1916. Irwin was killed as a result of being thrown through a saloon window in Philadelphia, as a shard of glass penetrated his jugular vein.

On June 18, 1910, Portsmouth player/manager Pete Childs threw a one–pitch triple play. Portsmouth was losing to the 7–3 to the Marion Diggers in the bottom of the 8th inning. Player/manager Childs put himself in to pitch with the bases loaded and 0 outs, replacing Frank Harter. The Marion batter hit Childs' first pitch to the fence in center field, where it was caught by Frank O'Day, with the three base runners all running on the play. O'Day then threw to the cutoff man and runners were forced out at 1st base and 2nd base to complete the triple play.

The Cobblers ended the 1911 season with a record of 78–61, placing third in the standings. Pete Childs served as manager. Portsmouth finished 6.0 games behind the first place Springfield Reapers in the final standings, as the Ohio State League expanded to eight teams.

=== 1912 to 1915: Ohio State League ===
The Portsmouth Cobblers won their second Ohio State League championship in 1912. The Cobblers ended the 1912 season with an overall record of 81–52, with Pete Childs served as manager. Portsmouth won both half–seasons of the eight–team 1912 Ohio State League and no playoffs were held.

At age 19, Baseball Hall of Fame member Billy Southworth began his professional career with the 1912 Cobblers. Southworth hit .278 playing in 134 games for Portsmouth. Southworth had been a catcher, but was switched to outfield when Portsmouth already had two catchers on their roster.

On September 23, 1913, Portsmouth hosted an exhibition game against the Chicago Cubs. Portsmouth native Al Bridwell was playing shortstop for the Cubs. The day was proclaimed to be, "Al Bridwell Day" in Portsmouth.

Continuing Ohio State League play in 1913, the Cobblers placed third in the eight–team league, finishing with a record of 83–55 under returning manager Pete Childs. Portsmouth finished 3.0 games behind the first place Chillicothe Babes in the final standings. Ed Donalds had a 30–8 record pitching record for the Cobblers, leading the Ohio State League in wins. Billy Southworth began the 1913 season with Portsmouth, hitting .310 in 77 games before being promoted to the Toledo Mud Hens. Southworth ended the 1913 season in the major leagues with the Cleveland Naps.

The 1914 Portsmouth Cobblers won their third Ohio State League championship. Ending the 1914 season with a record of 86–53, the Cobblers finished first in the eight-team Ohio State League standings as Pete Childs served his final season as the Portsmouth manager. The Cobblers finished 8.0 games ahead of the second place Charleston Senators in the final standings. Paul Carter of Portsmouth led the league in wins with 22.

In their final season of play, the 1915 Portsmouth Cobblers defended their championship under a new manager and won their fourth league title. Chet Spencer served as manager as the Portsmouth Cobblers of the Ohio State League ended the 1915 season with a record of 71–42, to win the league pennant and the first–half title. In the playoffs the Cobblers defeated the Maysville Angels, winners of the second–half title, 4 games to 1 to win the championship. Portsmouth's Ralph Sharman led the league in hitting, batting .374.

Portsmouth continued Ohio State League play in 1916 under a different nickname and won a fifth Ohio State League title for Portsmouth. The Portsmouth Truckers won the 1916 Ohio State League championship under returning manager Chet Spencer.

== The ballpark ==
The Portsmouth Cobblers and Portsmouth Truckers hosted home minor league home games at Millbrook Park. Millbrook Park was completed in 1902 and was prone to flooding, closing in 1937. The park was located adjacent to a steel mill in New Boston, Ohio, the adjacent village to Portsmouth. The amusement park had streetcar service and amenities that included the ballfield, a roller coaster, carousel, pavilion, a concert pavilion called "The Casino" and lakes for boating and ice skating. The ballpark had a covered grandstand.

== Timeline ==
Year(s)	# Yrs.	Team	Level	League	Ballpark
1908–1915	8	Portsmouth Cobblers	Class D	Ohio State League	Millbrook Park

== Year–by–year records ==
Year	Record	Finish	Manager	Playoffs / notes
1908	46–103	6th	Ned Ransick / R. Quinn	Springfield (17–30) moved to Portsmouth June 16
1909	48–76	4th	Jack McCallister / Billy Doyle / Charley O'Day	No playoffs held
1910	86–52	1st	Pete Childs	League champions
1911	78–61	3rd	Pete Childs	No playoffs held
1912	81–52	1st	Pete Childs	Win 1st half and 2nd half pennants League champions
1913	83–55	3rd	Pete Childs	No playoffs held
1914	86–53	1st	Pete Childs	League champions
1915	71–42	1st	Chet Spencer	Won pennant League champions

== Notable alumni ==
- Billy Southworth (1912–1913) Inducted Baseball Hall of Fame, 2008
- Harry Blake (1909)
- Jack Bushelman (1908)
- Paul Carter (1914)
- Howdy Caton (1914)
- Pete Childs (1910–1914, MGR)
- Ed Conwell (1909–1914)
- Cal Crum (1914)
- Pickles Dillhoefer (1914–1915)
- Ed Donalds (1912–1913)
- Frank Emmer (1915)
- Frank Harter (1910–1912)
- Ed Irwin (1910)
- Bill Jackson (1909)
- Larry Jacobus (1915)
- Bill Jones (1910)
- Sad Sam Jones (1914)
- Tacks Latimer (1908)
- Rube Marshall (1912)
- Jack McCallister (1909, MGR)
- Alex McColl (1915)
- Austin McHenry (1915)
- Jack Mercer (1908)
- Frank Mills (1915)
- Frank Moore (1910–1911)
- John Potts (1911)
- Ralph Sharman (1915)
- Chet Spencer (1908–1909), (1915, MGR)
- Al Tedrow (1914)
- Portsmouth Cobblers players
