= New Philadelphia Red Birds =

- 1936; New Philadelphia, Ohio

Minor league affiliations
- Class: Class D (1936–1941)
- League: Ohio State League (1936–1941)

Major league affiliations
- Team: St. Louis Cardinals (1936)

Minor league titles
- League titles (0): None

Team data
- Name: New Philadelphia Red Birds (1936)
- Ballpark: Tuscora Park* (1936)

The New Philadelphia Red Birds were a minor league baseball team based in New Philadelphia, Ohio. In 1936, the New Philadelphia Red Birds played briefly as members of the Class D level Ohio State League, as a minor league affiliate of the St. Louis Cardinals.

== History ==
The New Philadelphia Red Birds began minor league baseball play in 1936 as members of the six–team Class D level Ohio State League. The "Red Birds" moniker reflected the franchise as an affiliate of the St. Louis Cardinals. The charter Ohio State League members in 1936 were the Fostoria Cardinals, Fremont Reds, Mansfield Tigers, New Philadelphia Red Birds, Sandusky Sailors and Tiffin Mud Hens.

Beginning play in the 1936 Ohio State League, the New Philadelphia franchise had a short existence. After beginning play, the team had a 2–6 record when the New Philadelphia Red Birds folded on May 26, 1936. The New Philadelphia manager was George Silvey. After New Philadelphia folded, Silvey moved to manage the 1936 Fostoria Cardinals, who became a St. Louis Cardinals affiliate.

New Philadelphia, Ohio has not hosted another minor league team.

== The ballpark ==
The name of the New Philadelphia Red Birds' home minor league ballpark is not directly referenced. Tuscora Park in New Philadelphia was in existence as a public park with ballfields during the era. Still in use today with the Waterworks Ball Fields, vintage amusement rides and public amenities, Tuscora Park is located at 161 Tuscora Avenue in New Philadelphia, Ohio.

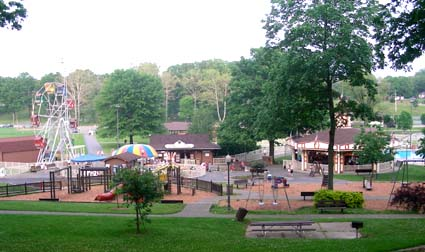
(2006) Tuscora Park. New Philadelphia, Ohio

== Year-by-year record ==
Year	Record	Finish	Manager	Playoffs?Notes
1936	2–6	NA	George Silvey	Team folded May 26

== Notable alumni ==
No alumni of the New Philadelphia Red Birds reached the major leagues.
