= Settlemire =

Settlemire is a surname. Notable people with the surname include:

- Chris Settlemire (born 1985), American actor and model
- Merle Settlemire (1903–1988), American baseball player, manager, and scout
