= Marion Diggers =

Minor league baseball team in Ohio

- 1908–1912; Marion, Ohio

Minor league affiliations
- Class: Class D (1908–1912)
- League: Ohio State League (1908–1912)

Major league affiliations
- Team: None

Minor league titles
- League titles (0): None

Team data
- Name: Marion Diggers (1908–1912)
- Ballpark: Webb Park (1908–1912)

The Marion Diggers were a minor league baseball team based in Marion, Ohio and Marion County, Ohio. From 1908 to 1912, the Diggers played as members of the Class D level Ohio State League, hosting home minor league games at Webb Park. Despite not winning a league championship, the Diggers finished in the top three in the final standings in each full season of play. Future president Warren Harding was a part owner of the Marion Diggers.

== History ==
Marion, Ohio first hosted minor league baseball in 1900, when the Marion "Glass Blowers" played a partial season as members of Class B level Interstate League. The Diggers were preceded in minor league play by the 1906 "Marion" team that played a partial season in the Class B level Interstate Association and the 1906 and 1907 Marion Moguls of the Class C level Ohio-Pennsylvania League.

After Marion did not host a minor league team in 1907, the 1908 Marion "Diggers" were charter members of the reformed, six-team, Class D level Ohio State League. The Lancaster Lanks, Lima Cigarmakers, Mansfield Pioneers, Newark Newks and Springfield Reapers teams joined Marion in beginning Ohio State League play on April 23, 1908.

In their first season of play, the Diggers finished third in the six–team Ohio State League. The Diggers ended their initial Ohio State League season with a record of 78–71, playing the season under manager Charley O'Day. The Diggers finished 14.0 games behind the first place Lancaster Lanks in the final regular season standings, as the league held no playoffs. Marion's Hughie Tate won the league batting title, hitting .320 and also led the Ohio State League with 169 total hits.

The Marion Diggers continued play in the 1909 Ohio State League. The Diggers placed second in the standings with a 71–59 record, playing the season under managers Charley O'Day and Joe Lewis. Marion finished 8½ games behind the first place Lima Cigarmakers in the final standings. The Diggers had three league leaders in 1909, as Red Farrell won the league batting title, hitting .321 and Joe Stanley led the league with 142 total hits. Diggers' pitcher Ed Zmich won 21 games to lead the league.

The Diggers placed third in 1910, as the franchise continued play in the six-team Ohio state League. The Diggers finished third in the standings, with a record of 80-58. Marion finished the season 6.0 games behind the first place Portsmouth Cobblers in the six-team league final standings. Joe Lewis returned as the Marion manager. Pitcher Ted Goulait of Marion led the league with 21 wins.

=== Warren G. Harding ownership ===
Future President of the United States, a local politician and business owner at the time, Warren G. Harding became a part owner of the Marion Diggers before the 1911 season. A Marion native, Harding owned the Marion Star Newspaper at the time and became a team owner of the local team in his hometown. Harding admired Wilbur Cooper, who played for Marion in 1911. Cooper and Harding remained friends as Cooper became a major league player and Harding was elected as President.

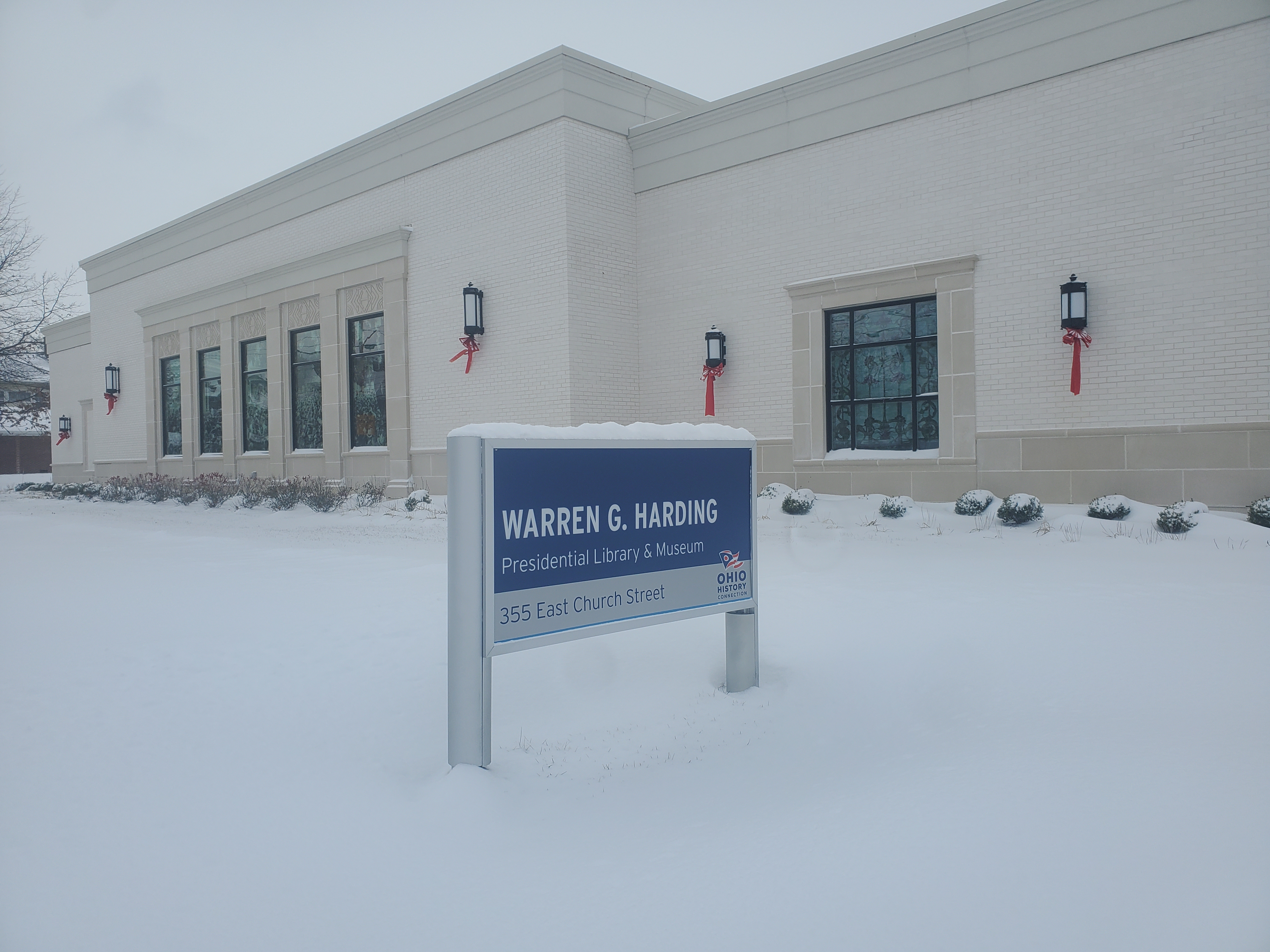
(2022) Warren G. Harding Presidential Center. Marion, Ohio.

In 1911, an expanded Ohio State League added two teams and Diggers placed second in the eight-team league. Marion ended the season with an 80-59 record, playing a third season under returning manager Joe Lewis. The Diggers finished 4.0 games behind the first place Springfield Reapers in the final standings.

In their final season of play, the 1912 Marion Diggers relocated during the season, as the Ohio State League returned to a six–team league. On July 11, 1912, the league took over the Marion franchise and moved it to Ironton, Ohio on July 15, with a 32-44 record. Playing as the Ironton Orphans, the team ended the season with an overall record of 65–72, finishing 24½ games behind the first place Portsmouth Cobblers. Fred Johnston, Fred Odwell and Bill Johnstone managed the team. Waldo Jackley of Marion/Ironton won the batting title, leading the league with a .357 batting average and also hit 11 home runs, tops in the Ohio State League. Sandy Burk the league with a 21-10 record.

Marion, Ohio next hosted a minor league team in 1915, when the Marion Senators played the season as members of the Class D level Buckeye League. In 1937, the Marion Presidents rejoined the Ohio State League and the Marion franchise played thorough the 1951 season.

== The ballpark ==
The Marion Diggers hosted minor league home games at Webb Park. The ballpark had a capacity of 800.

== Timeline ==
Year(s)	# Yrs.	Team	Level	League	Ballpark
1908-1912	5	Marion Diggers	Class D	Ohio State League	Webb Park

== Year-by-year records ==
Year	Record	Finish	Manager	Playoffs / Notes
1908	78–71	3rd	Charley O'Day	No playoffs held
1909	71–59	3rd	Charley O'Day / Joe Lewis	No playoffs held
1910	80–58	3rd	Joe Lewis	No playoffs held
1911	80–59	2nd	Joe Lewis	No playoffs held
1912	65–72	4th	Fred Johnston / Fred Odwell; Bill Johnstone	Marion (32-44) moved to Ironton July 15.

== Notable alumni ==
- Elmer Brown (1908)
- Sandy Burk (1908)
- Wilbur Cooper (1911)
- Davey Crockett (1908)
- Pat Duncan (1912)
- Ted Goulait (1910-1911)
- Phil Ketter (19-8)
- Charlie Luskey (1908)
- Frank Madden (1912)
- Jack Mercer (1908)
- Frank Moore (1912)
- Fred Odwell (1912, MGR)
- Jiggs Parson (1909)
- Ossee Schreckengost (1910)
- Joe Stanley (1909)
- Hughie Tate (1908)
- Fred Trautman (1912)
- Ed Zmich (1909-1910)

== See also ==
- Marion Diggers players
