= Chappie Geygan =

American baseball player (1903–1966)

- Shortstop
- Born: June 3, 1903; Ironton, Ohio, U.S.
- Died: March 15, 1966 (aged 62); Columbus, Ohio, U.S.
- Batted: Right Threw: Right

MLB debut
- July 16, 1924, for the Boston Red Sox

Last MLB appearance
- May 10, 1926, for the Boston Red Sox

MLB statistics
- Batting average: .252
- Home runs: 0
- Runs scored: 7
- Stats at Baseball Reference

Teams
- Boston Red Sox (1924–1926)

James Edward Geygan (June 3, 1903 – March 15, 1966) was an American shortstop in Major League Baseball. Born in Ironton, Ohio, he played for the Boston Red Sox from 1924 to 1926. He died at age 62 in Columbus, Ohio.

He managed in the minor leagues from 1936 to 1941, primarily in the Ohio State League, with the Sandusky Sailors and Fremont Green Sox.
