= Harry Daubert =

American baseball player (1892–1944)

- Pinch hitter
- Born: June 19, 1892; Columbus, Ohio, U.S.
- Died: January 8, 1944 (aged 51); Detroit, Michigan, U.S.
- Batted: Right Threw: Right

MLB debut
- September 4, 1915, for the Pittsburgh Pirates

Last MLB appearance
- September 4, 1915, for the Pittsburgh Pirates

MLB statistics
- Games played: 1
- At bats: 1
- Hits: 0
- Stats at Baseball Reference

Teams
- Pittsburgh Pirates (1915)

Harry J. Daubert (June 19, 1892 – January 8, 1944) was an American professional baseball player from 1912 to 1919. He was a shortstop in the minor leagues and appeared in one game in Major League Baseball as a pinch hitter. Daubert was 6 feet tall and weighed 160 pounds.

== Career ==
Daubert was born in Columbus, Ohio, in 1892. He started his professional baseball career in 1912 as a shortstop for the Ohio State League's Lima Cigarmakers. In his first season, he had a batting average of .211 in 127 games. He then went to the Hamilton Maroons in 1912 and batted .236.

After staying in the Ohio State League for the next couple of seasons, Daubert was purchased by the National League's Pittsburgh Pirates in August 1915. In his only MLB appearance, which came on September 4 of that year, he entered the game as a pinch hitter and struck out in his only at bat.

Daubert returned to the minor leagues in 1917. His career ended after the 1919 season, and he retired with 682 hits and a .235 batting average in 798 minor league games.

Daubert died of lobar pneumonia in 1944.
