= Fremont Reds =

- 1936–1941; Fremont, Ohio

Minor league affiliations
- Class: Class D (1936-1941)
- League: Ohio State League (1936-1941)

Major league affiliations
- Team: Cincinnati Reds (1936–1941)

Minor league titles
- League titles (2): 1938; 1941
- Conference titles (1): 1941
- Wild card berths (3): 1938; 1939; 1941

Team data
- Name: Fremont Reds (1936–1938); Fremont Green Sox (1938–1941)
- Ballpark: Anderson Field (1936-1941)

The Fremont Reds were a minor league baseball team based in Fremont, Ohio. From 1936 to 1941, Fremont teams played as members of the Class D level Ohio State League, winning two league championships. The Fremont Reds were an affiliate of the Cincinnati Reds from 1936 to 1938, before playing from 1939 to 1941 as the Fremont "Green Sox." The Fremont Reds and Green Sox teams hosted home minor league games at Anderson Field, which is still in use today.

== History ==
The 1936 Fremont Reds began minor league baseball play as members of the six–team Class D level Ohio State League. The "Reds" nickname reflected the franchise being an affiliate of the Cincinnati Reds. The Fostoria Cardinals, Mansfield Tigers, New Philadelphia Red Birds, Sandusky Sailors and Tiffin Mud Hens joined Fremont in beginning Ohio State League play on May 18, 1936.

Beginning play in the 1936 Ohio State League, the Fremont Reds finished with a 42–56 record, placing fourth, playing the season under manager Marty Purtell. On May 27, 1936, in a game at Redbird Park in Fostoria, the Fostoria Cardinals defeated the Fremont Reds by a score of 27–12. The Reds finished the season 19.5 games behind the first place Tiffin Mud Hens in the final Ohio State League regular season standings.

Continuing play in the 1937 Ohio State League season as a Cincinnati Reds affiliate, the 1937 Fremont Reds finished a distant fifth place in the six–team league. With a record of 36–55 under player/manager Harold Bohl, the Reds finished 27.0 games behind the first place Mansfield Red Sox in the final standings.

The 1938 Fremont team changed monikers during the season and won the Ohio State League Championship. The Ohio State League played the 1938 season as a four–team league and Fremont changed monikers from "Reds" to become the "Freemont Green Sox" on June 18, 1938. Fremont ended the regular season with a record of 51–43, placing second in the regular season standings. Managed by Chappie Geygan, the Green Sox finished 3.0 games behind the first place Fostoria Red Birds. In the Ohio State League finals, Fremont swept Fostoria 3 games to 0 to win the 1938 Ohio State League Championship.

The Fremont Green Sox' uniforms were white flannel, trimmed in green piping, with black belts. The caps were solid green and stockings were green and white.

The Fremont Green Sox finished in third place as the 1939 Ohio State League returned to a six–team league. Fremont again qualified for the playoffs with a regular season record of 66–63, playing under returning manager Chappie Geygan, finishing the regular season 1.5 games behind the first place Findlay Oilers. The Green Sox lost in first round of the playoffs, as the eventual champion Lima Pandas beat Fremont 2 games to 1.

The Fremont Green Sox finished in last place in the 1940 Ohio State League. With a 43–75 regular season record under managers Ray Caldwell and Luke Sewell, Fremont placed sixth in the six–team league. Fremont finished the season 41.5 games behind the first place Lima Pandas.

In their final season of play, the 1941 Fremont Green Sox won the Ohio State League Championship. With a record of 67–34 record under returning manager Chappie Geygan, Fremont finished the regular season in first place, as the league held no playoffs. Fremont was 4.0 games ahead of the second place Mansfield Braves in the final standings. Fremont pitcher Lloyd Fisher led the Ohio State League with an 18–3 record. Fischer was traded to the Brooklyn Dodgers for two players and cash.

After the 1941 season concluded, the Ohio State League ceased play until 1944 due to World War II. Fremont did not field a franchise in the league when the Ohio State League reformed in 1944. Fremont, Ohio has not hosted another minor league team.

== The ballpark ==
The Fremont Reds and Fremont Green Sox teams hosted home minor league games at Anderson Field. Today, the site is still in use as a public park. In 1996, three youth league fields were built on the site of Anderson Field. Today, the site is called "Anderson Fields," located at 1313 Oak Harbor Road in Fremont, Ohio.

== Timeline ==
Year(s)	# Yrs.	Team	Level	League	Affiliate	Ballpark
1936–1938	3	Fremont Reds	Class D	Ohio State League	Cincinnati Reds	Anderson Field
1938–1941	4	Fremont Green Sox	Class D	Ohio State League	None	Anderson Field

== Year–by–year records ==
Year	Record	Finish	Manager	Playoffs/notes
1936	42–56	4th	Marty Purtell	No playoffs held
1937	36–55	5th	Harold Bohl	Did not qualify
1938	51–43	2nd	Chappie Geygan	League champions
1939	66–63	3rd	Chappie Geygan	lost in 1st round
1940	43–75	6th	Ray Caldwell / Luke Sewell	Did not qualify
1941	60–34	1st	Chappie Geygan	League Champions

== Notable alumni ==
- Ray Caldwell (1940, MGR)
- Chappie Geygan (1938-1939, 1941, MGR)
- Ed Klieman (1937)
- Al LaMacchia (1939)
- Bill Ramsey (1941)
- Emil Verban (1936)

=== See also ===
Fremont Green Sox players
Fremont Reds players
