= Paddy Fox =

British Army Sergeant (1933–2016)

Paddy Fox BEM
- Born: William Francis Fox; 3 September 1933; Clonmel, Irish Free State
- Died: 9 January 2016 (aged 82)
- Military career
- Allegiance: United Kingdom
- Branch: British Army
- Service years: 1951–1956, 1958–1988
- Rank: Staff sergeant
- Unit: 15th/19th The King's Royal Hussars

William Francis "Paddy" Fox BEM (3 September 1933 – 9 January 2016) was a British Army recruiter and Chelsea Pensioner. He served as a radio operator in the 15th/19th The King's Royal Hussars from 1951. With a brief period as a court usher from 1956 to 1958, Fox remained in the army until 1988. In 1968 he became a recruiter, based in Horden near Peterlee in County Durham. By the end of his career he had recruited 2,000 men to his regiment, becoming the British Army's most successful recruiting sergeant.

Fox received the British Empire Medal and the Meritorious Service Medal. In retirement Fox found employment as an usher in the Peterlee magistrates court. Suffering from poor health in later life, he entered the Royal Hospital Chelsea in 2001. He worked there as a tour guide while also maintaining allotments and helping with the Royal British Legion's Poppy Appeal. In 2010, as part of the hospital's Men in Scarlet act, he sang on a music album. He died in 2016.

== Early life and career ==
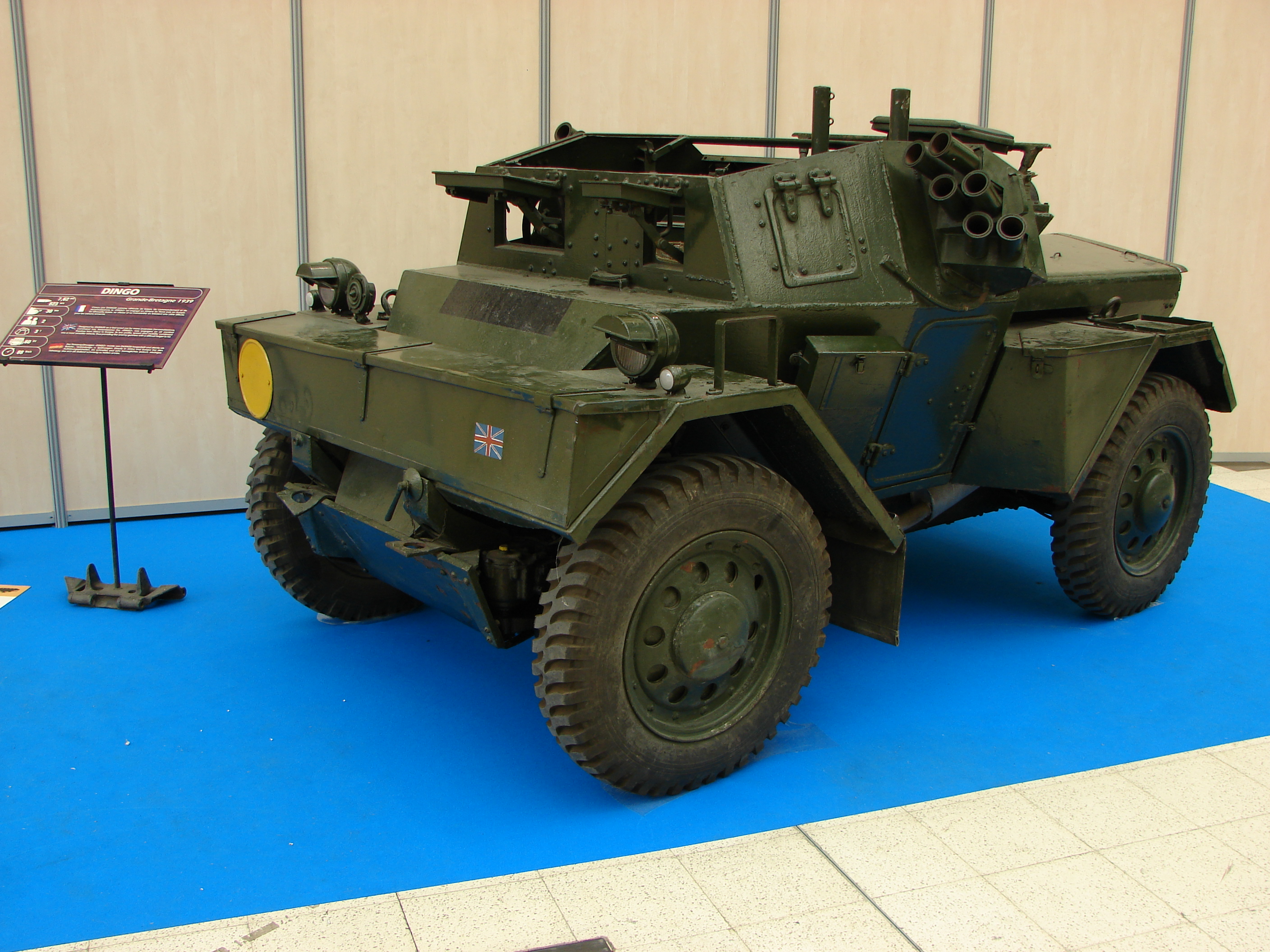
A Daimler Dingo

Fox, who was always known as "Paddy", was born at a racing stables near Clonmel, County Tipperary, in the Irish Free State on 3 September 1933. His father was a groom from Belfast and his mother a nurse from Oxfordshire; they had both moved to Clonmel to work on a country estate. At birth Fox weighed just 3 pounds (1.4 kg); the attending doctor advised that he would not survive and a grave was dug for him. Fox was raised in the Church of Ireland faith. Fox had eleven siblings and his family was poor. Four of Fox's elder brothers left to join the British Army during the Second World War. Fox wanted to join them but was too young.

In May 1951 Fox enlisted in the 15th/19th The King's Royal Hussars, a British Army cavalry regiment. He served with them as a radio operator in the Daimler Dingo armoured car. Later in his career he served as a radio instructor, a nuclear, biological and chemical warfare instructor and flew in Saunders-Roe Skeeter helicopters. After an initial deployment to Hamburg, Germany, he was posted to various garrisons for two years before being sent to Derry, Northern Ireland, on secondment to the North Irish Horse, a Territorial Army unit.

Fox left the army in 1956. He spent two years as an usher at the magistrates court in Durham, England, before rejoining the 15th/19th Hussars. During this period of his service he ran the household of the General Officer Commanding, Northumbrian District and attended various courses, including in recruitment.

== Recruiter ==
From 1962 Fox served with the army's Recruiting Organisation. From August 1968 he served as a recruiter in Horden, near Peterlee in County Durham. Fox increased recruitment in the district, of around 20,000 people, from around 26 per year to 63 by the end of his first year and 112 per year by 1972. He was posted elsewhere in January 1973 but returned in October. In his absence recruitment had fallen but he found 34 new recruits in his first six months back in the post. Fox was discharged in 1988, having reached 37 years of service and attained the rank of staff sergeant. In a twenty-year period he had recruited 2,000 men to his regiment, becoming the army's most successful recruiting sergeant.

Fox's service as a recruiter was recognised with the award of the British Empire Medal (BEM) in the 1975 Birthday Honours and the Meritorious Service Medal in 1984. He also had an Army Long Service and Good Conduct Medal and bar. The nomination statement for the BEM said that Fox set a "splendid example of the Army to the public". He was noted for organising coach trips to allow a recruit's family to attend their passing out parade and frequently spoke at local schools. His office was often visited by local soldiers, home on leave. Such was his effect on the recruits that they became known locally as "Pad's Army". Fox received several gifts from Peterlee Town Council for his work as a recruiter.

== Retirement ==
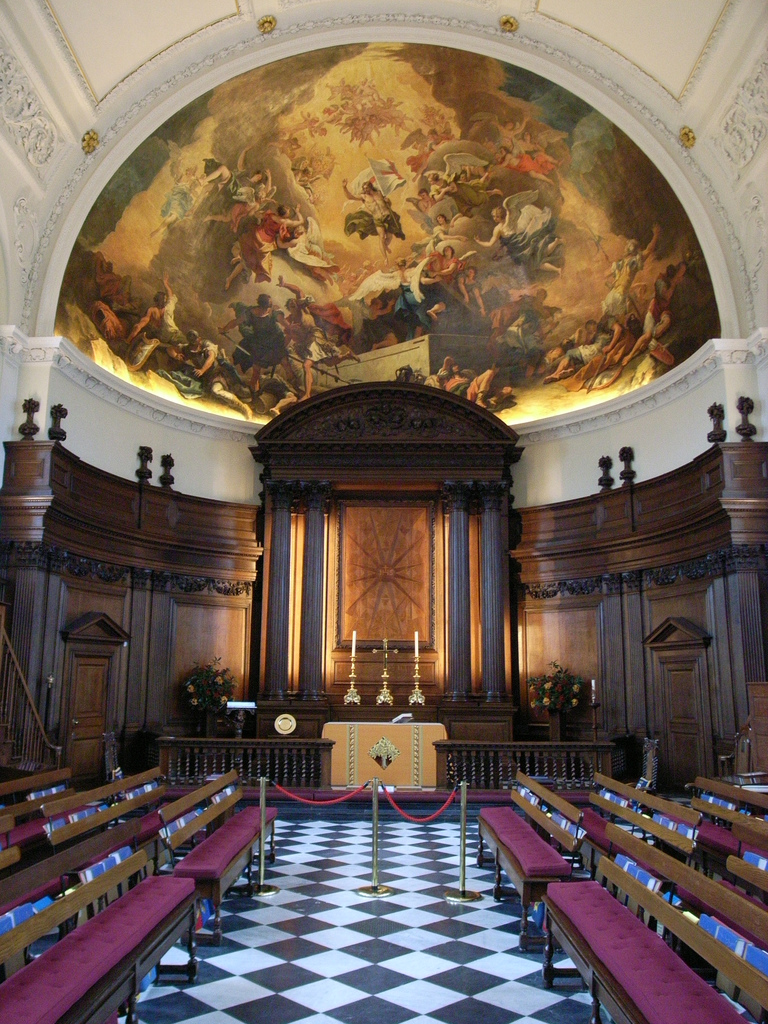
Chapel of the Royal Hospital

Upon retiring from the army Fox travelled to Peterlee, with all of his belongings packed into a Volkswagen Beetle. He again became a magistrate's court usher, serving at the town's court for 12 years. He joined the congregation of St Cuthbert's Church of the Church of England and later served as church warden and verger. Fox had been engaged four times but never married, citing his commitment to his army career.

In later life Fox suffered from ill health and entered the Royal Hospital Chelsea as a Chelsea Pensioner in 2001. He became a tour guide at the hospital in 2003 and was made chief tour guide in 2009. He also served as the hospital's chapel mace bearer and in that role often greeted Baroness Thatcher when she attended Sunday services there. In April 2013 he served at Thatcher's funeral, being one of those who lined the steps of St Paul's Cathedral as her coffin was carried in. Through the hospital he also met Elizabeth II on numerous occasions and was familiar with Princess Beatrice through links to her school.

Fox also maintained allotments at the hospital and two that he presented at the Chelsea Flower Show won an award. Fox participated in the Royal British Legion's annual Poppy Appeal, travelling to Jersey to do so. He was also a member of the hospital's Men in Scarlet music group, who were signed to Rhino Records in 2010 and released an album that same year. In 2011 his portrait was painted in oil by Lucy Portman and is held in the hospital's collection.

Fox died on 9 January 2016. His funeral was held at the hospital on 28 January and a memorial service, led by the former mayor of Peterlee, was held at St Cuthbert's Church on 13 February.
