= Bob Kline =

American baseball player (1909–1987)

- Pitcher
- Born: December 9, 1909; Enterprise, Ohio, U.S.
- Died: March 16, 1987 (aged 77); Westerville, Ohio, U.S.
- Batted: Right Threw: Right

MLB debut
- September 17, 1930, for the Boston Red Sox

Last MLB appearance
- July 15, 1934, for the Washington Senators

MLB statistics
- Won–lost record: 30–28
- Earned run average: 5.05
- Strikeouts: 87
- Stats at Baseball Reference

Teams
- Boston Red Sox (1930–1933); Philadelphia Athletics (1934); Washington Senators (1934)

Robert George Kline [Junior] (December 9, 1909 – March 16, 1987) was an American pitcher in Major League Baseball who played for three teams between the 1930 and 1934 seasons. Listed at 6' 3", 200 lb., Kline batted and threw right-handed. He was born in Enterprise, Ohio.

== Career ==
A fastball thrower, Kline started and filled various relief roles coming out of the bullpen as a closer, middle reliever, and set-up man. He entered the majors in 1930 with the Boston Red Sox, playing for them four years before joining the Philadelphia Athletics (1934) and Washington Senators (1934). While in Boston, he learned to pitch a sinker from roommate Wilcy Moore which helped him to win 11 games in 1932.

On October 1, 1933, Kline was the opposing pitcher at Yankee Stadium during the last pitching appearance for Babe Ruth.

At the end of the season, Kline was sent by Boston, along with Rabbit Warstler and cash, to the Athletics in a transaction that brought Lefty Grove, Rube Walberg and Max Bishop to the Red Sox. He split the season with Philadelphia and Washington, collecting seven relief wins to lead the American League pitchers after his contract was sold to the Senators on June 23, 1934.

In a five-season career, Kline posted a 30–28 record with 87 strikeouts and a 5.05 earned run average in 148 appearances, including 37 starts, eight complete games, one shutout, seven saves, and 441 2/3 innings of work.

Following his playing career, Kline managed the 1946 Marion Cardinals and 1947 Johnson City Cardinals. He died in Westerville, Ohio, at age 77.
