= Fostoria Red Birds =

- 1936–1941; Fostoria, Ohio

Minor league affiliations
- Class: Class D (1936–1941)
- League: Ohio State League (1936–1941)

Major league affiliations
- Team: St. Louis Cardinals (1936–1941)

Minor league titles
- League titles (0): None
- Wild card berths (1): 1939

Team data
- Name: Fostoria Cardinals (1936); Fostoria Red Birds (1937–1941)
- Ballpark: Redbird Park (1936–1941)

The Fostoria Red Birds was a minor league baseball team based in Fostoria, Ohio, playing from 1937 to 1941. First known as the Fostoria "Cardinals" in 1936, Fostoria teams played exclusively as members of the Class D level Ohio State League, and played as a minor league affiliate of the St. Louis Cardinals for the entirety of their existence. Fostoria hosted minor league home games at Redbird Park.

== History ==
The Fostoria Cardinals began minor league baseball play in 1936 as members of the six–team Class D level Ohio State League. The "Cardinals" moniker reflected the franchise as an affiliate of the St. Louis Cardinals. Joining Fostoria in the six–team Ohio State League in 1936 were the Fremont Reds, Mansfield Tigers, New Philadelphia Red Birds (also a St. Louis Cardinals affiliate), Sandusky Sailors and Tiffin Mud Hens.

Beginning play in the 1936 Ohio State League, the Fostoria Cardinals placed third with a 40–50 record, playing the season under managers Harry Aldrick and George Silvey. Silvey began the season managing the New Philadelphia Red Birds, who folded on May 26, 1936, after eight games. On May 27, 1936, in a game at Redbird Park, the Fostoria Cardinals defeated the Fremont Reds by a score of 27–12. The Cardinals finished 15.0 games behind the first place Tiffin Mud Hens in the final Ohio State League regular season standings. Fostoria pitcher Steve Vargo led the 1936 Ohio State League with 156 strikeouts and teammate Ed Zipay was the league batting champion, hitting with a .419 batting average.

Continuing play in the 1937 Ohio State League season, the team became known as the "Fostoria Red Birds" while remaining an affiliate of the St. Louis Cardinals. The 1937 Red Birds finished a distant last in the six–team league. With a 20–68 record, Fostoria placed sixth under managers John Cavanaugh, Red Jenkins (twice), Rex Bowen and Harry Aldrick. The Red Birds finished 41.5 games behind the first place Mansfield Red Sox in the final standings.

The 1938 Fostoria Red Birds won the Ohio State League pennant, as the Ohio State League played the 1938 season as a four–team league. With a regular season record of 55–41, Fostoria finished first in the regular season standings, playing the season under manager Jack Farmer. The Red Birds finished 3.0 games ahead of the second place Fremont Reds/Green Sox in the regular season standings. In the Ohio State League final, Fostoria lost to Fremont 3 games to 0. Player/manager Jack Farmer led the Ohio State League with 164 strikeouts.

In 1939 the Ohio State League returned to a six–team league and Fostoria again qualified for the playoffs. The Red Birds placed third in the regular season standings with a 66–63 record. Playing under returning player/manager Jack Farmer, Fostoria ended the season 1.5 games behind the first place Findlay Oilers. The Red Birds lost in first round of the playoffs to Findlay 2 games to 0. Fostoria pitcher Fred Berger led the Ohio State League with 231 strikeouts.

The Fostoria Red Birds finished in fifth place in the 1940 Ohio State League. Managed by Bobby Jones, Fostoria ended the season with a 44–73 record, finishing 40.0 games behind the first place Lima Pandas.

In their final season of play, the 1941 Fostoria Red Birds placed fourth in the six–team Ohio State League. With a record of 49–57 under managers Lee Ellison and Charles Cronin, Fostoria finished 21.5 games behind the first place Fremont Green Sox. In 1941, Jim Pruett of Fostoria led the Ohio State League in hitting with a .340 batting average. After the 1941 season, the Ohio State League ceased play until 1944 due to World War II. Fostoria did not field a franchise when the Ohio State League returned to play. Fostoria has not hosted another minor league team since the 1941 Red Birds.

== Ballpark ==
The Fostoria teams played home games at Redbird Park. The ballpark had a capacity of 1,500 in 1939 and dimensions of (Left, Center, Right): 340–445–340 in 1939. Redbird Park was located on the southwest side of town at the southeast corner of the intersection of Findlay and Lytle streets, and Independence Ave. The ballpark was demolished sometime around 1944.

== Timeline ==
Year(s)	# Yrs.	Team	Level	League	Affiliate	Ballpark
1936	1	Fostoria Cardinals	Class D	Ohio State League	St. Louis Cardinals	Redbird Park
1937–1941	5	Fostoria Red Birds	Class D	Ohio State League	St. Louis Cardinals	Redbird Park

== Year–by–year records ==
Year	Record	Finish	Manager	Playoffs / notes
1936	40–50	3rd	Harry Aldrick / George Silvey	Did not qualify
1937	20–68	6th	John Cavanaugh / Red Jenkins / Rex Bowen/ Harry Aldrick	Did not qualify
1938	55–41	1st	Jack Farmer	Lost league finals
1939	66–63	3rd	Jack Farmer	Lost 1st round
1940	44–73	5th	Bobby Jones	Did not qualify
1941	49–57	4th	Lee Ellison / Charles Cronin	Did not qualify

== Notable alumni ==
- Pat Capri (1938–1939)
- Glenn Crawford (1939)
- Al LaMacchia (1939)
- Johnny Lucadello (1936)
- Tony Lucadello (1936)

=== See also ===
Fostoria Red Birds players
