= Howard McGraner =

American baseball player (1889–1952)

- Pitcher
- Born: September 11, 1889; Luhrig, Ohio, U.S.
- Died: October 22, 1952 (aged 63); Zaleski, Ohio, U.S.
- Batted: Left Threw: Left

MLB debut
- September 12, 1912, for the Cincinnati Reds

Last MLB appearance
- October 6, 1912, for the Cincinnati Reds

MLB statistics
- Win–loss record: 1-0
- Earned run average: 7.11
- Strikeouts: 5
- Stats at Baseball Reference

Teams
- Cincinnati Reds (1912)

Howard McGraner (September 11, 1889 – October 22, 1952) was an American pitcher in Major League Baseball. He played for the Cincinnati Reds.
