= Middletown Rockets =

Defunct Minor League Baseball team from Ohio

The Middletown Rockets were a Minor League Baseball club based in Middletown, Ohio. The Rockets joined the Ohio State League as a replacement for the Middletown Red Sox, playing from 1945 to 1946, while serving as an affiliate team for the Cincinnati Reds in 1946. Dale Long and Wally Post played for the Rockets.
