= Merle Settlemire =

American baseball player (1903–1988)

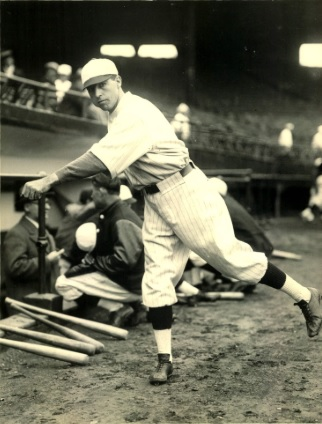
- Pitcher
- Born: January 19, 1903; Santa Fe, Ohio, U.S.
- Died: June 12, 1988 (aged 85); Russells Point, Ohio, U.S.
- Batted: Left Threw: Left

MLB debut
- April 13, 1928, for the Boston Red Sox

Last MLB appearance
- September 29, 1928, for the Boston Red Sox

MLB statistics
- Win–loss record: 0–6
- Earned run average: 5.47
- Strikeouts: 12
- Stats at Baseball Reference

Teams
- Boston Red Sox (1928)

Edgar Merle Settlemire (January 19, 1903 – June 12, 1988) was an American professional baseball player, manager and scout. A left-handed pitcher, he appeared in 30 games in Major League Baseball for the 1928 Boston Red Sox. He was listed as 5 feet 9 inches (1.75 m) tall and 156 pounds (71 kg).

Settlemire was born in Santa Fe, Ohio. His professional career began in 1924 and continued for 17 seasons over 21 years, through 1944. In his only year in the major leagues, 1928, he dropped all six of his decisions for a 57–96–1 Red Sox team that finished eighth and last in the American League, 431/2 games behind the World Series champion New York Yankees. Of his 30 appearances, nine were starts. He allowed 116 hits, 50 earned runs and 34 bases on balls in 821/3 innings pitched, with only 12 strikeouts.

He managed in the minor leagues from 1939–1942 and 1945–1947 in the Ohio State League, Northeast Arkansas League, Appalachian League and Eastern League. He later was a scout for the Brooklyn Dodgers.
