= Ted Goulait =

American baseball player

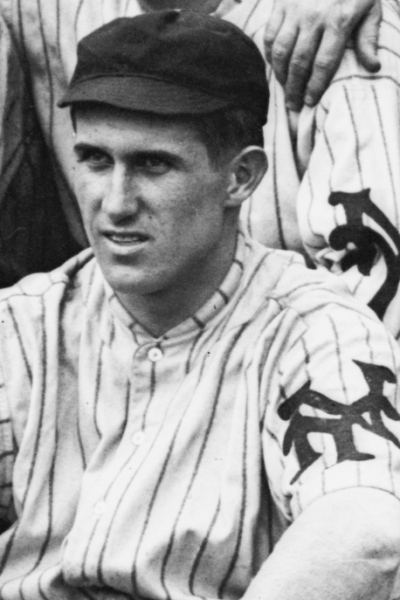
- Pitcher
- Born: August 12, 1889; St. Clair, Michigan, United States
- Died: July 15, 1936 (aged 46); St. Clair, Michigan, United States
- Batted: Right Threw: Right

MLB debut
- September 28, 1912, for the New York Giants

Last MLB appearance
- September 28, 1912, for the New York Giants

MLB statistics
- Games played: 1
- Innings pitched: 7
- Earned run average: 6.43
- Stats at Baseball Reference

Teams
- New York Giants (1912)

Theodore Lee Goulait (August 12, 1889 – July 15, 1936) was an American pitcher in Major League Baseball who played for the New York Giants in September 1912, among other teams.

Goulait was born on August 12, 1889, in St. Clair, Michigan, and died in his hometown on July 15, 1936, aged 46.
