= Chet Spencer =

American baseball player (1883–1938)

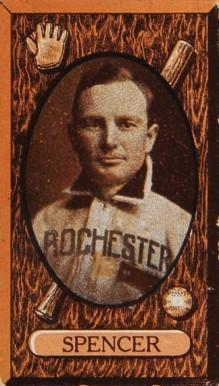
- Outfielder
- Born: March 4, 1883; South Webster, Ohio, U.S.
- Died: November 10, 1938 (aged 55); Portsmouth, Ohio, U.S.
- Batted: Left Threw: Right

MLB debut
- August 22, 1906, for the Boston Beaneaters

Last MLB appearance
- August 29, 1906, for the Boston Beaneaters

MLB statistics
- Games played: 8
- At bats: 27
- Hits: 4
- Stats at Baseball Reference

Teams
- Boston Beaneaters (1906)

Chester Arthur Spencer (March 4, 1883 – November 10, 1938) was an American Major League Baseball outfielder. Spencer played for the Boston Beaneaters in 1906. In eight career games, he had four hits in 27 at-bats. He batted left and threw right-handed.

Spencer was born in South Webster, Ohio and died in Portsmouth, Ohio.
