= Bert Blue =

American baseball player (1877–1929)

- Catcher
- Born: December 9, 1877; Bettsville, Ohio
- Died: September 2, 1929 (aged 51); Detroit, Michigan
- Batted: Right Threw: Right

MLB debut
- June 15, 1908, for the St. Louis Browns

Last MLB appearance
- September 4, 1908, for the Philadelphia Athletics

MLB statistics
- Batting average: .286
- Home runs: 0
- Runs batted in: 2
- Stats at Baseball Reference

Teams
- St. Louis Browns (1908); Philadelphia Athletics (1908)

Bird Wayne "Bert" Blue (December 9, 1877 – September 2, 1929) was an American professional baseball catcher.

== Career ==
He played in Major League Baseball (MLB) for one season with St. Louis Browns and Philadelphia Athletics. For his career, he compiled a .286 batting average in 42 at-bats, with two runs batted in.

== Early life and Death ==
He was born in Bettsville, Ohio. He died at age 51 in Detroit, Michigan, where he is buried at Woodlawn Cemetery.
