= Ed Donalds =

American baseball player (1883–1950)

- Pitcher
- Born: June 22, 1883; Bidwell, Ohio, U.S.
- Died: July 3, 1950 (aged 67); Columbus, Ohio, U.S.
- Batted: Right Threw: Right

MLB debut
- September 1, 1912, for the Cincinnati Reds

Last MLB appearance
- September 1, 1912, for the Cincinnati Reds

MLB statistics
- Games pitched: 1
- Earned run average: 4.50
- Strikeouts: 1
- Stats at Baseball Reference

Teams
- Cincinnati Reds (1912)

Edward Alexander Donalds (June 22, 1883 – July 3, 1950), nicknamed "Erston", was an American professional baseball pitcher who played in one game for the Cincinnati Reds on September 1, 1912.
