= Ed Zmich =

American baseball player (1884–1950)

- Pitcher
- Born: October 1, 1884; Cleveland, Ohio
- Died: August 20, 1950 (aged 65); Cleveland, Ohio
- Batted: Left Threw: Left

MLB debut
- July 23, 1910, for the St. Louis Cardinals

Last MLB appearance
- June 2, 1911, for the St. Louis Cardinals

MLB statistics
- Earned run average: 5.18
- Win–loss record: 1-5
- Strikeouts: 23
- Stats at Baseball Reference

Teams
- St. Louis Cardinals (1910–11)

Edward Albert Zmich (October 1, 1884 – August 20, 1950) was an American professional baseball pitcher. He played parts of two seasons in Major League Baseball with the St. Louis Cardinals in 1910–1911. His first ever game was in 1910 at the age of 25. His last game was one year later in 1911.

He did not attend college. He batted and threw left-handed. He was 6 ft 0 in (1.83 m) in height and weighed 180 pounds.

He is buried at St. Mary Cemetery in Cleveland, Ohio.
