= Newark Newks =

- 1905–1915; (1905–1912, 1915); Newark, Ohio

Minor league affiliations
- Previous classes: Class D (1911–1912, 1915); Class B (1911); Class D (1908–1910); Class C (1905–1907)
- League: Buckeye League (1915); Ohio State League (1911–1912); Central League (1911); Ohio State League (1908–1910); Ohio–Pennsylvania League (1905–1907)

Team data
- Previous names: Newark New Socks (1915); Newark Newks (1912); Newark Skeeters (1911); Newark Newks (1907–1910); Newark Cotton Tops (1906); Newark Idlewilds (1905)

The Newark Newks was the predominant name of a minor league baseball team based in Newark, Ohio from 1905 until 1915. The team was first known as the Newark Idlewilds and began playing in the Ohio–Pennsylvania League. In 1906 the club changed its name to the Newark Cotton Tops. Finally in 1907, the team took on the Newks name. In 1908 the team moved in the Ohio State League, where they played until 1911. On June 22, 1911, the team moved to Piqua, Ohio to become the Piqua Picks. However that June, the Grand Rapids Furniture Makers of the Central League moved to Newark and became the Newark Skeeters. The next season the Skeeters played in the Ohio State League and posted a 72–68 record before vanishing. The city fielded the Newark New Socks (sometimes referred to as the Newsocks) in the 1915 Buckeye League. Newark was without a team until the 1944 Newark Moundsmen returned to play in the Ohio State League.

== Year-by-year records ==
Year	Record	Finish	Manager	Notes
1905	37–46	NA	Jack Doyle	
1906	65–74	6th	Gene Bates, Bill Bottenus, Andy Sommers & Walter Snodgrass	
1907	86–53	2nd	Bob Berryhill	
1908	74–75	5th	Bob Berryhill & Harry Eells	
1909	46–64	NA	Homer Davidson & Erve Wratten	
1910	58–80	4th	Bob Berryhill, Charles Riehl, Charles O'Day	
1911	29–33	5th	Alfred Newnham	Team moved to Piqua, Ohio on June 22
1911	34–42	7th	Harley Parker & John Pendry	Grand Rapids moved to Newark on June 27
1912	70–68	3rd	Jack Grim, Sandy Murray & Barry McCormick	
1915	14–24	4th	Erv Wrattan	

== Timeline ==
Year(s)	# Yrs.	Team	Level	League	Affiliate
1889	1	Newark	Independent	Ohio State League	None
1905	1	Newark Idlewinds	Class C	Ohio-Pennsylvania League	None
1906	1	Newark Cotton Tops	Class C	Ohio-Pennsylvania League	None
1907	1	Newark Newks	Class C	Ohio-Pennsylvania League	None
1908–1910	3	Newark Newks	Class D	Ohio State League	None
1911	1	Newark	Class D	Ohio State League	None
1912	1	Newark Skeeters	Class D	Ohio State League	None
1915	1	Newark New Socks	Class D	Buckeye League	None
1944–1947	4	Newark Moundsmen	Class D	Ohio State League	St. Louis Browns
1948–1951	4	Newark Yankees	Class D	Ohio-Indiana League	New York Yankees
1994	1	Newark Buffalos	Independent	Frontier League	None
