= Zeke Wrigley =

American baseball player (1874–1952)

- Shortstop
- Born: January 18, 1874; Philadelphia, Pennsylvania, U.S.
- Died: September 28, 1952 (aged 78); Philadelphia, Pennsylvania, U.S.
- Batted: Unknown Threw: Unknown

MLB debut
- August 31, 1896, for the Washington Senators

Last MLB appearance
- October 14, 1899, for the Brooklyn Superbas

MLB statistics
- Batting average: .258
- Home runs: 5
- Runs batted in: 117
- Stats at Baseball Reference

Teams
- Washington Senators (1896–1898); New York Giants (1899); Brooklyn Superbas (1899)

George Watson Wrigley (January 18, 1874 – September 28, 1952) was an American former professional baseball player. He played all or part of four seasons in Major League Baseball, from 1896 to 1899, primarily as a shortstop.
