= Mansfield Pioneers =

Mansfield minor league baseball teams
- (1887–1890, 1893, 1897–1900, 1906–1912, 1935–1937, 1939–1941); Mansfield, Ohio

Minor league affiliations
- Previous classes: Class D (1936–1937, 1939–1941); Independent (1935); Class D (1912); Class C (1910–1911); Class D (1908–1909); Class C (1906–1907); Class B (1897–1900)
- League: Ohio State League (1912, 1935–1937, 1939–1941); Ohio–Pennsylvania League (1906–1911); Interstate League (1897–1900); Ohio–Michigan League (1893); Tri-State League (1888–1890); Ohio State League (1887)

Minor league titles
- League titles: 3 (1889, 1935, 1937)

Team data
- Previous names: Mansfield Braves (1940–1941); Mansfield Indians (1939); Mansfield Red Sox (1937); Mansfield Tigers (1935–1936); Mansfield Brownies (1911–1912); Mansfield Reformers (1910); Mansfield Pioneers (1907–1909); Mansfield Giants (1906); Mansfield Haymakers (1897–1900); Mansfield Electricians (1893); Mansfield (1887–1890)

The city of Mansfield, Ohio, was home to minor league baseball teams, known by various nicknames, which played periodically between 1887 and 1912, and between 1935 and 1941.

== History ==
=== Late 19th century ===
The team first began play in the Ohio State League in 1887 as simply Mansfield. The following season, the club moved to the Tri-State League until 1890. After a three-year hiatus, Mansfield once again fielded a new team, the Mansfield Electricians and played the 1893 season in the short-lived Ohio–Michigan League. No team was then fielded until 1897, when the city fielded the Mansfield Haymakers in the Interstate League.

=== Early 20th century ===
In 1906, the city was represented in then Ohio–Pennsylvania League with the Mansfield Giants. The club changed its name to the Mansfield Pioneers in 1907 until 1909. The team was once again renamed the Mansfield Reformers in 1910 and the Mansfield Brownies in 1911. In 1912 the club moved back to the Ohio State League for their final season of this era.

=== Pre-World War II ===
In 1935, the Mansfield Tigers were champions of the Ohio State League. The Tigers also competed briefly in 1936, disbanding on May 25. In 1937, competing as the Mansfield Red Sox, the team again were Ohio State League champions. The team's final seasons were 1939 as the Mansfield Indians, 1940 as the Mansfield Braves, and 1941 as the Braves.

== Year-by-year record ==
Year	Record	Finish	Manager	Notes
1887	46–56	6th	Sandy McDermott, Bob Allen & Frank O'Brien	
1888	43–74	6th	Frank Torreyson, Frank O'Brien, James Green & Ed Darrow	
1889	49–25	1st	George Greer	League champions
1893	19–19	3rd	Cal McVey	
1897	63–61	5th	Con Strouthers & Barton Howard	
1898	71–75	6th	Barton Howard	
1899	86–54	2nd	Dan Lowney	
1900	67–68	5th	Dan Lowney	
1906	59–77	7th	Carl McVey	
1907	55–84	T6th	Carl McVey	
1908	76–73	4th	Carl McVey & Tim Flood	
1909	63–58	3rd	Tim Flood	
1910	60–66	5th	George Fox	
1911	55–82	5th	Ed Hahn, Les Channell & Frank Reynolds	
1912	72–67	2nd	Barry McCormick & Walter East	
