= 1950 St. Louis Browns season =

Major League Baseball season

1950 St. Louis Browns
- League: American League
- Ballpark: Sportsman's Park
- City: St. Louis, Missouri
- Record: 58–96 (.377)
- League place: 7th
- Owners: Bill DeWitt
- General managers: Bill DeWitt
- Managers: Zack Taylor
- Television: KSD (Buddy Blattner)
- Radio: WEW/KWK (Bill Snyder, Les Carmichael)

The 1950 St. Louis Browns season involved the Browns finishing 7th in the American League with a record of 58 wins and 96 losses.

== Offseason ==
- October 3, 1949: Ralph Winegarner was released by the Browns.
- December 5, 1949: Grant Dunlap was drafted by the Browns from the Cleveland Indians in the 1949 minor league draft.
- December 13, 1949: Bob Dillinger and Paul Lehner were traded by the Browns to the Philadelphia Athletics for Ray Coleman, Billy DeMars, Frankie Gustine, Ray Ippolito (minors) and $100,000.
- Prior to 1950 season: Bud Black was signed as an amateur free agent by the Cardinals.

== Regular season ==
=== Season standings ===
American League
Team	W	L	Pct.	GB	Home	Road
New York Yankees	98	56	.636	—	53‍–‍24	45‍–‍32
Detroit Tigers	95	59	.617	3	50‍–‍30	45‍–‍29
Boston Red Sox	94	60	.610	4	55‍–‍22	39‍–‍38
Cleveland Indians	92	62	.597	6	49‍–‍28	43‍–‍34
Washington Senators	67	87	.435	31	35‍–‍42	32‍–‍45
Chicago White Sox	60	94	.390	38	35‍–‍42	25‍–‍52
St. Louis Browns	58	96	.377	40	27‍–‍47	31‍–‍49
Philadelphia Athletics	52	102	.338	46	29‍–‍48	23‍–‍54

=== Record vs. opponents ===
1950 American League record Sources:
Team	BOS	CWS	CLE	DET	NYY	PHA	SLB	WSH
Boston	—	15–7	10–12	10–12	9–13	19–3	19–3	12–10
Chicago	7–15	—	8–14	6–16–2	8–14	11–11	12–10	8–14
Cleveland	12–10	14–8	—	13–9–1	8–14	17–5	13–9	15–7
Detroit	12–10	16–6–2	9–13–1	—	11–11	17–5	17–5	13–9
New York	13–9	14–8	14–8	11–11	—	15–7	17–5	14–8–1
Philadelphia	3–19	11–11	5–17	5–17	7–15	—	8–14	13–9
St. Louis	3–19	10–12	9–13	5–17	5–17	14–8	—	12–10
Washington	10–12	14–8	7–15	9–13	8–14–1	9–13	10–12	—

=== Notable transactions ===
- May 11, 1950: Grant Dunlap was returned by the Browns to the Cleveland Indians.
- July 1, 1950: Jack Bruner was purchased by the Browns from the Chicago White Sox.
- August 1950: Chuck Oertel was acquired by the Browns from the Baxley-Hazelhurst Red Sox.

=== Roster ===
1950 St. Louis Browns
Roster
Pitchers: 35 Ed Albrecht; 36 Russ Bauers; 37 Jack Bruner; 46 Harry Dorish; 23 Cliff Fannin; 24 Tom Ferrick; 42 Tommy Fine; 31 Ned Garver; 22,26 Don Johnson; 30 Bill Kennedy; 25 Lou Kretlow; 36 Cuddles Marshall; 21 Joe Ostrowski; 40 Stubby Overmire; 21,36 Duane Pillette; 46 Ribs Raney; 27 Sid Schacht; 22 Lou Sleater; 28 Dick Starr; 20 Al Widmar	Catchers: 9 Sherm Lollar; 10 Les Moss; Infielders: 3 Hank Arft; 1 Billy DeMars; 7 Owen Friend; 6 Frankie Gustine; 14 Don Lenhardt; 8 Bill Sommers; 2 Snuffy Stirnweiss; 2 Leo Thomas; 4 Tom Upton	Outfielders: 17 Ray Coleman; 27 Jim Delsing; 19 Dick Kokos; 15 Roy Sievers; 12 Ken Wood	Manager: 38 Zack Taylor; Coaches: 32 Earle Brucker; -- Ed Redys; 33 Jack Tobin; 34 Ralph Winegarner

== Player stats ==
=== Batting ===
==== Starters by position ====
Note: Pos = Position; G = Games played; AB = At bats; H = Hits; Avg. = Batting average; HR = Home runs; RBI = Runs batted in

Pos	Player	G	AB	H	Avg.	HR	RBI
C	Sherm Lollar	126	396	111	.280	13	65
1B	Don Lenhardt	139	480	131	.273	22	81
2B	Owen Friend	119	372	88	.237	8	50
SS	Tom Upton	124	389	92	.237	2	30
3B	Leo Thomas	35	121	24	.198	1	9
OF	Ken Wood	128	369	83	.225	13	62
OF	Dick Kokos	143	490	128	.261	18	67
OF	Ray Coleman	117	384	104	.271	8	55

==== Other batters ====
Note: G = Games played; AB = At bats; H = Hits; Avg. = Batting average; HR = Home runs; RBI = Runs batted in

Player	G	AB	H	Avg.	HR	RBI
Roy Sievers	113	370	88	.238	10	57
Snuffy Stirnweiss	93	326	71	.218	1	24
Hank Arft	98	280	75	.268	1	32
Les Moss	84	222	59	.266	8	34
Jim Delsing	69	209	55	.263	0	15
Billy DeMars	61	178	44	.247	0	13
Bill Sommers	65	137	35	.255	0	14
Frankie Gustine	9	19	3	.158	0	2

=== Pitching ===
==== Starting pitchers ====
Note: G = Games pitched; IP = Innings pitched; W = Wins; L = Losses; ERA = Earned run average; SO = Strikeouts

Player	G	IP	W	L	ERA	SO
Ned Garver	37	260.0	13	18	3.39	85
Al Widmar	36	194.2	7	15	4.76	78
Joe Ostrowski	9	57.1	2	4	2.51	15

==== Other pitchers ====
Note: G = Games pitched; IP = Innings pitched; W = Wins; L = Losses; ERA = Earned run average; SO = Strikeouts

Player	G	IP	W	L	ERA	SO
Stubby Overmire	31	161.0	9	12	4.19	39
Dick Starr	32	123.2	7	5	5.02	30
Harry Dorish	29	109.0	4	9	6.44	36
Cliff Fannin	25	102.0	5	9	6.53	42
Don Johnson	25	96.0	5	6	6.09	31
Duane Pillette	24	73.2	3	5	7.09	18
Lou Kretlow	9	14.1	0	2	11.93	10
Sid Schacht	8	10.2	0	0	16.03	7
Ed Albrecht	2	6.2	0	1	5.40	1

==== Relief pitchers ====
Note: G = Games pitched; W = Wins; L = Losses; SV = Saves; ERA = Earned run average; SO = Strikeouts

Player	G	W	L	SV	ERA	SO
Cuddles Marshall	28	1	3	1	7.88	24
Tom Ferrick	16	1	3	2	4.12	6
Tommy Fine	14	0	1	0	8.10	6
Jack Bruner	13	1	2	1	4.63	16
Bill Kennedy	1	0	0	0	0.00	1
Russ Bauers	1	0	0	0	4.50	0
Ribs Raney	1	0	1	0	4.50	2
Lou Sleater	1	0	0	0	0.00	1

== Farm system ==
Level	Team	League	Manager
AAA	Baltimore Orioles	International League	Nick Cullop
AA	San Antonio Missions	Texas League	Don Heffner
A	Wichita Indians	Western League	Joe Schultz
B	Wichita Falls Spudders	Big State League	Hack Miller
C	Pine Bluff Judges	Cotton States League	Harry Chozen
C	Marshall Browns	East Texas League	Bruce Ogrodowski
C	Aberdeen Pheasants	Northern League	Irv Hall
D	Redding Browns	Far West League	Ray Perry
D	Pittsburg Browns	Kansas–Oklahoma–Missouri League	Olan Smith and Jim Crandall
D	Ada Herefords	Sooner State League	Bill Krueger
D	Appleton Papermakers	Wisconsin State League	Joe Skurski

LEAGUE CHAMPIONS: Marshall
