= 1950 New York Yankees season =

Season for the Major League Baseball team the New York Yankees

1950 New York Yankees
- World Series champions American League champions
- League: American League
- Ballpark: Yankee Stadium
- City: New York City
- Record: 98–56 (.636)
- League place: 1st
- Owners: Dan Topping; Del Webb
- General managers: George Weiss
- Managers: Casey Stengel
- Television: WABD (Mel Allen, Curt Gowdy, Dizzy Dean)
- Radio: WINS (AM) (Mel Allen, Curt Gowdy)

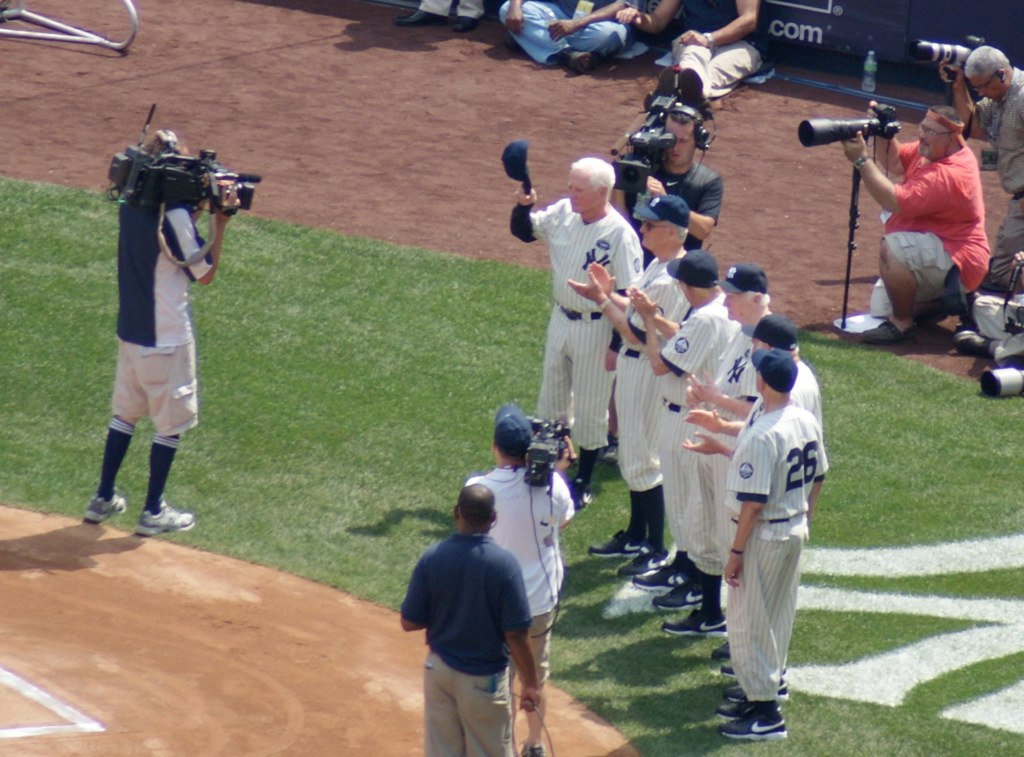
Members of the 1950 New York Yankees being honored at the 2010 Old-Timers' Day

The 1950 New York Yankees season was the 48th season for the team. The team finished with a record of 98–56, winning their 17th pennant, finishing 3 games ahead of the Detroit Tigers. In the World Series, they defeated the Philadelphia Phillies in 4 games. New York was managed by Casey Stengel. The Yankees played at Yankee Stadium.

Following the season, they were named "Team of the Year", amateur or professional, by the Associated Press.

== Offseason ==
- October 13, 1949: Billy Martin was purchased by the Yankees from the Oakland Oaks.
- Prior to 1950 season (exact date unknown)
  - Jim Brideweser was signed as an amateur free agent by the Yankees.
  - Don Taussig was signed as an amateur free agent by the Yankees.

== Regular season ==
=== Season standings ===
American League
| Team | W | L | Pct. | GB | Home | Road |
|---|---|---|---|---|---|---|
| New York Yankees | 98 | 56 | .636 | — | 53‍–‍24 | 45‍–‍32 |
| Detroit Tigers | 95 | 59 | .617 | 3 | 50‍–‍30 | 45‍–‍29 |
| Boston Red Sox | 94 | 60 | .610 | 4 | 55‍–‍22 | 39‍–‍38 |
| Cleveland Indians | 92 | 62 | .597 | 6 | 49‍–‍28 | 43‍–‍34 |
| Washington Senators | 67 | 87 | .435 | 31 | 35‍–‍42 | 32‍–‍45 |
| Chicago White Sox | 60 | 94 | .390 | 38 | 35‍–‍42 | 25‍–‍52 |
| St. Louis Browns | 58 | 96 | .377 | 40 | 27‍–‍47 | 31‍–‍49 |
| Philadelphia Athletics | 52 | 102 | .338 | 46 | 29‍–‍48 | 23‍–‍54 |

=== Record vs. opponents ===
1950 American League record Sources:
| Team | BOS | CWS | CLE | DET | NYY | PHA | SLB | WSH |
|---|---|---|---|---|---|---|---|---|
| Boston | — | 15–7 | 10–12 | 10–12 | 9–13 | 19–3 | 19–3 | 12–10 |
| Chicago | 7–15 | — | 8–14 | 6–16–2 | 8–14 | 11–11 | 12–10 | 8–14 |
| Cleveland | 12–10 | 14–8 | — | 13–9–1 | 8–14 | 17–5 | 13–9 | 15–7 |
| Detroit | 12–10 | 16–6–2 | 9–13–1 | — | 11–11 | 17–5 | 17–5 | 13–9 |
| New York | 13–9 | 14–8 | 14–8 | 11–11 | — | 15–7 | 17–5 | 14–8–1 |
| Philadelphia | 3–19 | 11–11 | 5–17 | 5–17 | 7–15 | — | 8–14 | 13–9 |
| St. Louis | 3–19 | 10–12 | 9–13 | 5–17 | 5–17 | 14–8 | — | 12–10 |
| Washington | 10–12 | 14–8 | 7–15 | 9–13 | 8–14–1 | 9–13 | 10–12 | — |

=== Roster ===
1950 New York Yankees
Roster
| Pitchers: 27 Lew Burdette; 28 Tommy Byrne; 26 Tom Ferrick; 19 Whitey Ford; 26 Don Johnson; 30 Eddie Lopat; 18,36 Dave Madison; 16 Ernie Nevel; 35 Joe Ostrowski; 11 Joe Page; 35 Duane Pillette; 18 Bob Porterfield; 17 Vic Raschi; 22 Allie Reynolds; 21 Fred Sanford | Catchers: 8 Yogi Berra; 32 Ralph Houk; 29 Charlie Silvera; Infielders: 6 Bobby Brown; 42 Jerry Coleman; 41 Joe Collins; 15 Tommy Henrich; 38 Johnny Hopp; 24 Billy Johnson; 12 Billy Martin; 36 Johnny Mize; 10 Phil Rizzuto; 1 Snuffy Stirnweiss; 9 Hank Workman | Outfielders: 25 Hank Bauer; 5 Joe DiMaggio; 40 Jackie Jensen; 27 Johnny Lindell; 7 Cliff Mapes; 14 Gene Woodling; Other batters: 54 Jim Delsing; 38 Gus Niarhos; 9 Dick Wakefield | Manager: 37 Casey Stengel; Coaches: 2 Frankie Crosetti; 33 Bill Dickey; 31 Jim Turner |

== Player stats ==
| = Indicates team leader |

=== Batting ===
==== Starters by position ====
Note: Pos = Position; G = Games played; AB = At bats; H = Hits; Avg. = Batting average; HR = Home runs; RBI = Runs batted in

| Pos | Player | G | AB | H | Avg. | HR | RBI |
|---|---|---|---|---|---|---|---|
| C | Yogi Berra | 151 | 597 | 193 | .322 | 28 | 124 |
| 1B | Joe Collins | 108 | 205 | 48 | .234 | 8 | 28 |
| 2B | Jerry Coleman | 153 | 522 | 150 | .287 | 6 | 69 |
| 3B | Billy Johnson | 108 | 327 | 85 | .260 | 6 | 40 |
| SS | Phil Rizzuto | 155 | 617 | 200 | .324 | 7 | 66 |
| OF | Gene Woodling | 122 | 449 | 127 | .283 | 6 | 60 |
| OF | Joe DiMaggio | 139 | 525 | 158 | .301 | 32 | 122 |
| OF | Hank Bauer | 113 | 415 | 133 | .320 | 13 | 70 |

==== Other batters ====
Note: G = Games played; AB = At bats; H = Hits; Avg. = Batting average; HR = Home runs; RBI = Runs batted in

| Player | G | AB | H | Avg. | HR | RBI |
|---|---|---|---|---|---|---|
| Cliff Mapes | 108 | 356 | 88 | .247 | 12 | 61 |
| Bobby Brown | 95 | 277 | 74 | .267 | 4 | 37 |
| Johnny Mize | 90 | 274 | 76 | .277 | 25 | 72 |
| Tommy Henrich | 73 | 151 | 41 | .272 | 6 | 34 |
| Jackie Jensen | 45 | 70 | 12 | .171 | 1 | 5 |
| Billy Martin | 34 | 36 | 9 | .250 | 1 | 8 |
| Johnny Hopp | 19 | 27 | 9 | .333 | 1 | 8 |
| Charlie Silvera | 18 | 25 | 4 | .160 | 0 | 1 |
| Johnny Lindell | 7 | 21 | 4 | .190 | 0 | 2 |
| Jim Delsing | 12 | 10 | 4 | .400 | 0 | 2 |
| Ralph Houk | 10 | 9 | 1 | .111 | 0 | 1 |
| Hank Workman | 2 | 5 | 1 | .200 | 0 | 0 |
| Snuffy Stirnweiss | 7 | 2 | 0 | .000 | 0 | 0 |
| Dick Wakefield | 3 | 2 | 1 | .500 | 0 | 1 |
| Gus Niarhos | 1 | 0 | 0 | ---- | 0 | 0 |

=== Pitching ===
==== Starting pitchers ====
Note: G = Games pitched; IP = Innings pitched; W = Wins; L = Losses; ERA = Earned run average; SO = Strikeouts

| Player | G | IP | W | L | ERA | SO |
|---|---|---|---|---|---|---|
| Vic Raschi | 33 | 256.2 | 21 | 8 | 4.00 | 155 |
| Allie Reynolds | 35 | 240.2 | 16 | 12 | 3.74 | 160 |
| Ed Lopat | 35 | 236.1 | 18 | 8 | 3.47 | 72 |
| Tommy Byrne | 31 | 203.1 | 15 | 9 | 4.74 | 118 |

==== Other pitchers ====
Note: G = Games pitched; IP = Innings pitched; W = Wins; L = Losses; ERA = Earned run average; SO = Strikeouts

| Player | G | IP | W | L | ERA | SO |
|---|---|---|---|---|---|---|
| Fred Sanford | 26 | 112.2 | 5 | 4 | 4.55 | 54 |
| Whitey Ford | 20 | 112.0 | 9 | 1 | 2.81 | 59 |
| Joe Ostrowski | 21 | 43.2 | 1 | 1 | 5.15 | 15 |
| Bob Porterfield | 10 | 19.2 | 1 | 1 | 8.69 | 9 |
| Ernie Nevel | 3 | 6.1 | 0 | 1 | 4.34 | 3 |

==== Relief pitchers ====
Note: G = Games pitched; W = Wins; L = Losses; SV = Saves; ERA = Earned run average; SO = Strikeouts

| Player | G | W | L | SV | ERA | SO |
|---|---|---|---|---|---|---|
| Joe Page | 37 | 3 | 7 | 13 | 5.04 | 33 |
| Tom Ferrick | 30 | 8 | 4 | 9 | 3.65 | 20 |
| Don Johnson | 8 | 0 | 1 | 0 | 10.00 | 9 |
| Duane Pillette | 4 | 0 | 0 | 0 | 1.29 | 4 |
| Lew Burdette | 2 | 0 | 0 | 0 | 6.75 | 0 |
| Dave Madison | 1 | 0 | 0 | 0 | 6.00 | 1 |

== 1950 World Series ==
AL New York Yankees (4) vs. NL Philadelphia Phillies (0)

| Game | Score | Date | Location | Attendance |
|---|---|---|---|---|
| 1 | Yankees – 1, Phillies – 0 | October 4 | Shibe Park | 30,746 |
| 2 | Yankees – 2, Phillies – 1 (10 innings) | October 5 | Shibe Park | 32,660 |
| 3 | Phillies – 2, Yankees – 3 | October 6 | Yankee Stadium | 64,505 |
| 4 | Phillies – 2, Yankees – 5 | October 7 | Yankee Stadium | 68,098 |

== Awards and honors ==
- Jerry Coleman, Babe Ruth Award
- Phil Rizzuto, American League MVP
- Yogi Berra, 3rd place in AL MVP voting

All-Star Game

- Yogi Berra - Starter
- Vic Raschi - Starter
- Phil Rizzuto - Starter

== Farm system ==
| Level | Team | League | Manager |
|---|---|---|---|
| AAA | Kansas City Blues | American Association | Joe Kuhel |
| AA | Beaumont Roughnecks | Texas League | Rogers Hornsby |
| A | Muskegon Clippers | Central League | Bob Finley |
| A | Binghamton Triplets | Eastern League | George Selkirk |
| B | Quincy Gems | Illinois–Indiana–Iowa League | James Adlam |
| B | Norfolk Tars | Piedmont League | Frank Novosel |
| C | Amsterdam Rugmakers | Canadian–American League | Mayo Smith |
| C | Grand Forks Chiefs | Northern League | Jack Farmer and Cedric Durst |
| C | Twin Falls Cowboys | Pioneer League | Wally Berger |
| C | Joplin Miners | Western Association | Harry Craft |
| D | LaGrange Troupers | Georgia–Alabama League | Carl Cooper |
| D | Independence Yankees | Kansas–Oklahoma–Missouri League | Bunny Mick and Bones Sanders |
| D | Newark Yankees | Ohio–Indiana League | Billy Holm |
| D | McAlester Rockets | Sooner State League | Vern Hoscheit |
| D | Fond du Lac Panthers | Wisconsin State League | Wayne Tucker |

LEAGUE CHAMPIONS: LaGrange, McAlester
