= Jim Delsing =

American baseball player (1925–2006)

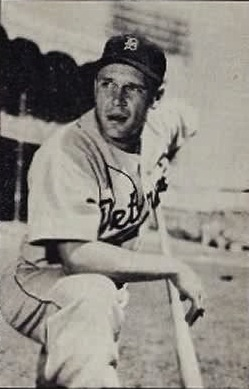
- Delsing in 1953
- Outfielder
- Born: November 13, 1925; Rudolph, Wisconsin, U.S.
- Died: May 4, 2006 (aged 80); Chesterfield, Missouri, U.S.
- Batted: Left Threw: Right

MLB debut
- April 21, 1948, for the Chicago White Sox

Last MLB appearance
- September 30, 1960, for the Kansas City Athletics

MLB statistics
- Batting average: .255
- Home runs: 40
- Runs batted in: 286
- Stats at Baseball Reference

Teams
- Chicago White Sox (1948); New York Yankees (1949–1950); St. Louis Browns (1950–1952); Detroit Tigers (1952–1956); Chicago White Sox (1956); Kansas City Athletics (1960)

James Henry Delsing (November 13, 1925 – May 4, 2006) was an American Major League Baseball outfielder who is most remembered for having been the pinch runner for 3 ft 7 in (1.09 m)-tall Eddie Gaedel on August 19, 1951. He also was the centerfielder replaced by Hall of Famer Al Kaline in Kaline's major league debut on June 25, 1953. During his career, which spanned 822 games over 10 seasons, Delsing played for the Chicago White Sox, New York Yankees, St. Louis Browns, Detroit Tigers, and Kansas City Athletics.

Delsing signed his first professional contract at the age of 16 in 1942 for the Green Bay Bluejays in the Wisconsin State League. After two years of Minor League Baseball, he joined the Army Medical Corps and served for over a year in Europe during World War II. He resumed his baseball career in 1946 and made his major league debut with the White Sox in 1948. In 1949, he was acquired by the Yankees, filling in for Joe DiMaggio for a few games late in the year while DiMaggio recovered from a virus. He was traded to the Browns in 1950 and became an everyday player in St. Louis for the next three seasons. In August 1952, he was traded to the Tigers. His best year in the major leagues came in 1953, when he had a batting average of .288 and hit 11 home runs. Delsing led American League left fielders with a .996 fielding percentage in 1954, but his batting average declined, and in 1955, he began losing playing time to Charlie Maxwell. In 1956, he started very few games, used mainly as a pinch hitter and defensive replacement for the Tigers and the White Sox, who reacquired him in May. He spent the next three seasons in the minor leagues, winning the American Association pennant with the Charleston Senators in 1958. In 1960, after several of their outfielders suffered injuries, the Athletics added Delsing to their roster in August; he finished his professional career playing 16 games for Kansas City.

Since his time with the Browns, Delsing had resided in the St. Louis. He continued to live there after his baseball career, serving as an advertising salesman for the St. Louis Review for over thirty years, helping out with Catholic charities, and participating in the St. Louis Browns Fan Club. He died of cancer on May 4, 2006.

== Early life ==
Delsing was born to Ben and Barbara Delsing in Rudolph, Wisconsin, on November 13, 1925. He was raised on a dairy farm with his sister, Clairbel. At Rudolph High School, Delsing played guard on the basketball team. "Basketball was our big sport," Delsing recalled. "We did not have enough guys for baseball. We didn't even have football. Our conference had about a half-dozen schools from other towns. I played guard, because I could run." He was skilled at handling the ball and dribbling, but Delsing also got the chance to play baseball with a semi-pro team in Stevens Point, as well as the Moland Truckers of the Wisconsin Valley League, where he competed against Elroy "Crazylegs" Hirsch, who went on to be a star in the National Football League. Delsing caught the eye of scout Eddie Kotal, who signed the 16-year-old to a contract for the Green Bay Bluejays of the Class D Wisconsin State League in 1942.

== Career ==
=== 1942–48: early years; reaching the major leagues with the White Sox ===
Once his junior year of high school ended, Delsing finished Green Bay's season playing shortstop for the team. "They thought I was a shortstop, because that's what I was playing in semipro," he recalled. "The only reason I played shortstop for Stevens Point was because nobody else could handle it. But I made a lot of errors. I either kicked the ball away, or I threw it away. I think I made more errors throwing than I did any other way, and it was a tough learning experience." He made 28 errors in 49 games and batted .249 with three home runs and 30 runs batted in (RBI). Green Bay finished a half-game back of the Sheboygan Indians for the league pennant.

Delsing graduated high school in 1943 and played for another Class D team, this time the Lockport Cubs of the Pennsylvania–Ontario–New York League (PONY League). He started his season as the third baseman but asked to be moved to the outfield after making 17 errors. Delsing batted .312, tenth in the league by players who participated in at least 50 games, and he had eight home runs and 69 RBI.

In 1944, the Milwaukee Brewers of the Class AAA American Association purchased his contract; Delsing made the team but would not play for two years, as the United States Army drafted him for service in World War II. Assigned to the 95th Evacuation Hospital of the Army Medical Corps, he spent over a year in Europe. When he was able to resume playing in 1946, he failed to get much playing time in spring training because the Brewers had a lot of outfielders, so he asked to be reassigned and was sent to play for the Eau Claire Bears of the Class C Northern League. He batted what would be a career-high .377 in 65 games with 61 RBI, earning a promotion to Milwaukee, where he batted .318 with 20 RBI. This caught the interest of the Chicago White Sox, who obtained him from the Brewers after the season. Delsing attended spring training with the White Sox in 1947 but was assigned to the Hollywood Stars of the Class AAA Pacific Coast League, with whom he had a good season. In 153 games, he batted .316 with 92 runs scored, 181 hits, five home runs, and 53 RBI.

Delsing was part of the White Sox roster to begin the 1948 season. His major league debut was brief. On April 21, he pinch-hit for pitcher Orval Grove in the seventh inning of a game against the Detroit Tigers. Since Delsing batted left-handed, Detroit opted to replace Dizzy Trout (a right-handed pitcher) with Stubby Overmire (a left-handed pitcher) on the mound, prompting White Sox manager Ted Lyons to pinch-hit for Delsing before he ever saw a pitch. He got more playing time in the second game of a doubleheader against the St. Louis Browns on April 25. Starting in left field, he had two hits and three RBI in a 7–6 loss. Delsing also had two hits in his next start on April 26, though he had 14 innings to do so as the White Sox lost 12–11 to the Cleveland Indians. After hitting .211 in nine games through May 8, though, he was sent back to Hollywood. Said Delsing, "I didn't do much in the big league. I batted under .200 [.211, actually]. So the White Sox optioned me back to Hollywood, and I had another good season in [the] Coast League." In 122 games with Hollywood, he batted .333 with 82 runs scored, 154 hits, six home runs, and 56 RBI. A September callup by the White Sox, Delsing started in center field for the ballclub from September 22 through October 3. In 20 games with Chicago, he batted .190 with 12 hits, no home runs, and five RBI. On December 14, he was traded to the New York Yankees for Steve Souchock.

=== 1949–52: substituting for DiMaggio, everyday outfielder for the Browns ===
The Yankees sent Delsing to spring training with the Kansas City Blues in 1949; Delsing served as their everyday centerfielder during the season. He played 151 of 153 games for the Blues, leading Kansas City hitters with a .317 average and hitting 24 doubles, five triples, and seven home runs. In September, he was called up by the Yankees, and he started four games in place of regular centerfielder Joe DiMaggio, who was suffering from a virus. His first game with the Yankees was the second game of a doubleheader against St. Louis on September 14, in which he had two hits and two runs scored. On September 28, he hit his first major league home run against Joe Coleman of the Philadelphia Athletics. The hit helped the Yankees win 7–5 and keep pace with the Boston Red Sox. They trailed the pennant race with Boston by one game that day but went on to sweep the Red Sox in the season's last two games and win the American League (AL) pennant. In nine games, Delsing batted .350 with five runs scored, seven hits, and three RBI. His promotion to the major leagues came too late in the season for him to be eligible for the playoff roster, but he was voted a partial share of the team's winnings when they beat the Brooklyn Dodgers in the 1949 World Series.

Delsing was part of the Yankees' roster for the 1950 season, but the team had many outfielders, and he only played 12 games (batting .400) through June 15 before being dealt to the St. Louis Browns at the trade deadline. He was traded with Snuffy Stirnweiss, Don Johnson, and Duane Pillette for Tom Ferrick, Sid Schacht, Joe Ostrowski, and Leo Thomas. "I became a regular in St. Louis, and I ended up hitting .269 the first year. Of course, it was a good move for my career. I wanted to get out of New York because I knew I wouldn't get to play, but in St. Louis I started," Delsing said of the deal, happy to get more playing time as the Browns' everyday centerfielder. His first game with the Browns was against the Yankees on June 16; Delsing had two hits, two RBI, and a run scored, but the Browns lost 7–5. In the second game of a doubleheader on July 16, he had three hits and three RBI in a 10–8 victory over the Washington Senators. He had three hits in a game three times during the year: July 16, August 9 against the Indians, and August 11 against the Tigers. In 69 games with the Browns, he batted .263 with 25 runs scored, 55 hits, no home runs, and 15 RBI. His combined totals in 81 games between St. Louis and New York were 27 runs scored, 59 hits, no home runs, 17 RBI, and a .269 average.

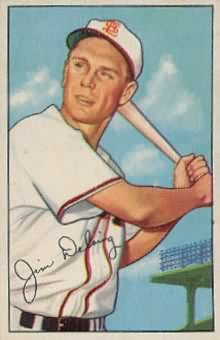
1952 Bowman Gum baseball card of Delsing with the Browns

Used only as a pinch-hitter for the Browns' first few games in 1951, Delsing became the team's regular centerfielder again starting with the sixth game. On May 16, he pinch-hit for Cliff Fannin in the third inning of a game against the Athletics and had a two-RBI double against Carl Scheib. Then, in the eighth inning, his single against Johnny Kucab scored Hank Arft and broke a 9–9 tie to give the Browns the winning 10th run. While running the bases against the Yankees on June 6, 1951, he ran into Phil Rizzuto, causing the shortstop to drop the ball, enabling the winning run to score in a 5–4 victory for the Browns. He left the Browns' game on June 19 in the fifth inning and did not play again for 13 games. On July 4, he had two hits and three RBI in a 6–5 loss to Cleveland.

Delsing's most famous moment in baseball came on August 19, 1951. Browns owner Bill Veeck, as a publicity stunt, hired a man with dwarfism to play a game for the Browns. The 3 ft 7 in (1.09 m) Eddie Gaedel popped out of a cake before the second game of a doubleheader against the Tigers, holding a toy bat and wearing the uniform number 1/8. Gaedel pinch-hit for Frank Saucier to lead off the game, drawing a walk against Bob Cain, who said that the short Gaedel's strike zone was "about the size of a baby's bib." Delsing was promptly sent in to pinch-run for Gaedel, and he played center field for the rest of the game as the Browns lost 6–2. In 2001, Delsing told the Chicago Sun-Times, "A lot of people say Maris hit 61, but I'm the only one who ran for a midget."

In 1951, the Browns finished in last place in the AL, posting a record of 52–102. Delsing played 131 of their games, batting .249 with 59 runs scored, 112 hits, eight home runs, and 45 RBI.

Delsing again opened 1952 as a reserve player but, after only about a week, was playing nearly every day. The Browns used him in center field and in left field at various points during the season. In the first game of a doubleheader against the Senators on May 4, he had three hits (including two doubles) in a 2–1 loss. He pinch-hit in the ninth inning for pitcher Ken Holcombe on July 6 and hit a home run against Art Houtteman in an 8–6 loss to the Tigers. On August 8, he had a three-RBI double against Bob Feller in a 12-inning, 10–9 loss to Cleveland. He batted .255 with 34 runs scored, 76 hits, one home run, and 34 RBI through 93 games with the Browns. Looking to improve their offense, the Browns included him in a trade with Ned Garver, Bud Black, and Dave Madison to the Tigers for slugger Vic Wertz, Don Lenhardt, Dick Littlefield, and Marlin Stuart on August 14.

=== 1952–56: everyday player with the Tigers, lost playing time in 1956 ===
Upon joining the Tigers, Delsing was used as the everyday left fielder. Souchock and Delsing hit back-to-back home runs in the first game of a doubleheader against the Browns on August 17; Delsing had three hits in that game, but the two runs were all for Detroit as they lost 4–2. In the first game of a doubleheader against Cleveland on September 3, Delsing had two hits (including a home run) and three RBI against Feller as the Tigers won 11–8. Though Delsing played 60 fewer games with Detroit in 1952 than he did with St. Louis, he tripled his home run total. Additionally, he batted .274 with 14 runs scored, 31 hits, and 13 RBI. In 126 games combined between the two teams, he batted .260 with 48 runs scored, 107 hits, four home runs, and 49 RBI.

Moved to his favorite position in 1953, Delsing enjoyed his best season as the Tigers' everyday centerfielder. On April 17, he hit two home runs against Feller and had four RBI as the Tigers beat the Indians 6–5. The next day, he had four hits in the first game of a doubleheader against the Browns, but St. Louis won 8–7. Delsing had three RBI and scored a run on May 1 in a 7–3 victory over the Athletics. On June 12, Delsing scored a run in the seventh inning with a triple, then snapped a 1–1 tie in the bottom of the ninth inning with a home run against Sonny Dixon as the Tigers beat the Senators 2–1. The next day, he hit a grand slam against Bob Porterfield in a 7–6 victory over the Senators. Against the Yankees on June 19, he hit two home runs against Bob Kuzava as the Tigers won 3–2. In a 5–2 loss to the Athletics on June 25, Delsing was replaced in the sixth inning in centerfield by future Hall of Famer Al Kaline, who was making his major league debut. The next day, Delsing had three hits against the Senators, including a two-RBI double against Johnny Schmitz as the Tigers won 7–3. In the first game of a doubleheader against the Athletics on September 9, he had three hits, including a home run against Harry Byrd, as the Tigers won 8–2. Delsing set career highs in almost every category in 1953, including games played (138), batting average (.288), runs scored (77), hits (138), home runs (11), and RBI (62).

In 1954, Delsing was shifted back to left field in favor of speedy newcomer Bill Tuttle. Delsing was injured several times during the season. He twisted a knee while sliding into a base (even though he was sliding head-first), he tore some ligaments in the other knee, and he was hit in the head with a pitch by Bob Turley. In spite of all that, he still played 122 games. On May 13, he had two hits and scored three runs in an 8–3 victory over the Athletics. He had four hits including a home run against Coleman on May 25 in a 12-inning, 5–4 victory over the Baltimore Orioles. On July 22, he had three hits and four RBI, including a home run against Moe Burtschy as the Tigers beat the Athletics 9–4. He had three hits and three RBI on September 20 in a 4–3 victory over Baltimore. Six days later, he had four hits and scored two runs, including a home run against Mike Garcia in a 13-inning, 8–7 victory over Cleveland. In 122 games, he batted .248 with 39 runs scored, 92 hits, six home runs, and 38 RBI. Defensively, he led AL left fielders with a .996 fielding percentage, committing only one error all season.

After the 1954 season, Delsing spent the winter working out in a gym and showed up to 1955 spring training in good shape. He was again used as the Tigers' left fielder, but starting in mid-May, he began losing occasional starts to Charlie Maxwell. On April 27, he had three hits and three RBI in an 11–3 win over Baltimore. In the second game of a doubleheader against Boston on May 15, he hit a home run against George Susce and had three RBI in a 9–3 victory. He had his third three-RBI game of the year on June 6, along with three hits, but the Tigers lost that game 7–5 to the Yankees. In the first game of a doubleheader against the Athletics on July 10, he had three hits in a 9–5 Tiger defeat. Hitting .270 through June, he batted .193 in the latter half of the season. In 114 games, Delsing batted .239 with 49 runs scored, 85 hits, 10 home runs, and 60 RBI.

Not a starter to begin the 1956 season, Delsing went hitless in his first 10 games before getting traded back to his original team, the White Sox, along with Fred Hatfield for Jim Brideweser, Harry Byrd, and Bob Kennedy on May 15. Because they already had three starters in the outfield, the White Sox used Delsing mainly as a pinch hitter and defensive replacement. In 55 games with Chicago, he batted .122 with 11 runs scored, five hits, no home runs, and two RBI. His combined average between Chicago and Detroit was .094.

=== 1957–60: battling for one last stint in the majors ===
In 1957, the White Sox assigned Delsing to their AAA team, the Indianapolis Indians of the American Association. In 139 games, Delsing batted .289 with 68 runs scored, 132 hits, eight home runs, and 70 RBI. The Milwaukee Braves attempted to purchase his contract during the year, but Chicago was not interested in ceding him to another team. Milwaukee acquired Bob Hazle instead, who enjoyed a successful year as the Braves won the NL pennant. After the 1957 season, the Tigers repurchased his contract, assigning him to the Charleston Senators of the American Association.

Delsing was one of several veteran players who helped Charleston win the American Association pennant in 1958. In 154 games for Charleston, he batted .287 with 78 runs scored, 167 hits, seven home runs, and 74 RBI. After the season, the Tigers included him in a trade that sent Reno Bertoia and Ron Samford to the Washington Senators for Eddie Yost and Rocky Bridges.

Sports Illustrated, in its preview of the 1959 Senators, was pessimistic about Delsing, saying he and fellow outfielder Faye Throneberry "don't scare many pitchers when they walk up to the plate." He was on card #386 in the 1959 Topps set, but Delsing never played a game with the Senators; an injured back hurt his chances of making the team. Acquired by the Houston Buffs of the American Association after spring training, Delsing played the whole of the 1959 season with them. "It was different in Houston," Delsing remembered. "I probably hit the ball as well as I ever did. If you check the records, you will see that lefthanded hitters don't do much hitting down there, because of the wind. The outfielders give you the right field line, and bunch you up toward the alleys in right-center and left-center. Those power alleys are where most of my base hits used to be. I would hit a good line drive and be headed around first going to second with a double, I thought, and some outfielder would be scooping up the ball, and I would be out. They just knew how to play the ballpark and the wind conditions. It was like that in the whole league. I thought it was a righthand-hitting league." In 149 games, he batted .233 with 51 runs scored, 122 hits, four home runs, and 40 RBI.

"I played Triple-A ball because I felt that I could still play in the big leagues," Delsing said of the late 1950s. "When you sit on the bench all year, like I did in Chicago in 1956, there is nothing you can do...you're not in shape...You just can't stay in shape and be sharp and be ready to play, when you're not playing." Delsing started 1960 with Charleston, playing 37 games before joining the Dallas-Fort Worth Rangers, also of the American Association, who he played 82 games for. With both those teams, he batted .297 with seven home runs and 37 RBI. After not playing in the major leagues since 1956, he got his chance to return in August when the Kansas City Athletics, who had experienced several injuries to their outfielders, added him to their roster. Delsing had hits in each of his first four games with the Athletics. On September 5, he had two hits, two RBI, and a run scored in an 8–7 victory over the White Sox. He appeared in his final major league game on September 30, when, as he had in his debut 12 years earlier, Delsing pinch-hit for the pitcher (Dick Hall). This time, he reached base on an error by shortstop Dick McAuliffe before being replaced in the next inning by new pitcher Ken Johnson. In 16 games for Kansas City, Delsing batted .250 with two runs scored, 10 hits, no home runs, and five RBI. For 1961, if Delsing wanted to continue with the organization, the Athletics were either going to have him coach or play for a minor league affiliate in Hawaii, but Delsing opted to retire instead.

"I always say that for me, it was pulling on that big-league uniform every day," Delsing described his biggest thrill of playing in the major leagues. Over a 10-year major league career, Delsing batted .255 with 322 runs scored, 627 hits, 40 home runs, and 286 RBI. As an outfielder, he recorded a .989 fielding percentage. In 1,227 minor league games, his batting average was .301. "I always preferred center field," Delsing recalled. "My throwing arm was accurate, but I didn't have that overpowering arm which guys like Al Kaline had. And I could run...I was never a power hitter. My power alleys' were to left-center and right-center. I was not a pull hitter. I was more of a line-drive hitter, just going for singles and doubles."

== Personal life ==
On November 1, 1949, Delsing married Roseanne Brennan, a stewardess for an airline. They bought a house in St. Louis in 1952 and continued to live there until around 1984, when they moved to the Chesterfield area west of the city. During his time with the Tigers, Delsing rented houses on Winthrop Street and Evergreen Road in the northwest part of Detroit. Over the offseason, Delsing worked as a carpenter during his baseball career.

The Delsings had five children: daughters Kim (b. 1951), Jamie (b. 1954), and Mari (or Moochie) (b. 1956) and sons Jay (b. 1960) and Bart (b. 1963). Jay went on to join the Professional Golfers' Association where he played golf competitively, and Jim's grandson Taylor Twellman was the Most Valuable Player of Major League Soccer in 2005.

After Delsing retired, he spent 30 years as an advertising salesman for the St. Louis Review, a Catholic newspaper. Delsing was also involved in the St. Vincent de Paul Society, the St. Nicholas food pantry, the Ascension Altar Society, and other Catholic charities. His time with the Browns made him a well-qualified member of the St. Louis Browns Fan Club, formed in 1984 to remember the franchise, which moved to Baltimore to become the Orioles after the 1953 season. Several of his former Browns teammates remained friends with him, such as Sherm Lollar (his best friend in St. Louis), Arft (who lived 15 minutes away from him in 1994), and Don Robinson (Delsing was in his wedding). Delsing died of cancer on May 4, 2006.

== See also ==
- Chicago White Sox all-time roster
