= Tom Ferrick (baseball) =

American baseball player (1915–1996)

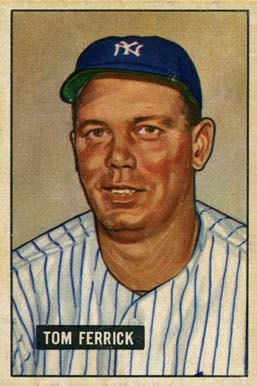
- Pitcher
- Born: January 6, 1915; New York, New York, U.S.
- Died: October 15, 1996 (aged 81); Lima, Pennsylvania, U.S.
- Batted: Right Threw: Right

MLB debut
- April 19, 1941, for the Philadelphia Athletics

Last MLB appearance
- September 28, 1952, for the Washington Senators

MLB statistics
- Win–loss record: 40–40
- Earned run average: 3.47
- Strikeouts: 245
- Saves: 56
- Stats at Baseball Reference

Teams
- Philadelphia Athletics (1941); Cleveland Indians (1942, 1946); St. Louis Browns (1946); Washington Senators (1947–1948); St. Louis Browns (1949–1950); New York Yankees (1950–1951); Washington Senators (1951–1952)

Career highlights and awards
- World Series champion (1950)

Thomas Jerome Ferrick (January 6, 1915 – October 15, 1996) was an American Major League Baseball pitcher, pitching coach and scout. Primarily a relief pitcher, he stood 6 ft 2 1/2 in (1.89 m) tall and weighed 220 pounds (100 kg) in his playing days. He batted and threw right-handed.

== Early years ==
Born in New York City, Ferrick spent four years in an upstate New York seminary studying for the Roman Catholic priesthood while also a farmhand with the home team New York Giants. He left the seminary in 1939 to attend training camp with the Giants, but was released by the club due to an injured arm.

He spent the 1940 season with the Brooklyn Bushwicks, and pitched well enough to catch the eye of Philadelphia Athletics manager Connie Mack.

== Philadelphia A's ==
Ferrick immediately shined upon his arrival in Philadelphia. He made his major league debut against the Boston Red Sox on April 19, 1941, and pitched three scoreless innings in relief. When the first place Cleveland Indians came to Shibe Park on a five-game winning streak for a three-game set against the last place A's on May 18–20, Ferrick appeared in two of the three games. He earned his first major league win in game one of the set, stepping in for an injured Johnny Babich in the fifth inning, and only allowing one Cleveland base runner to reach second base. In the third game of the set, Ferrick closed the game with two perfect innings to allow his team to hold onto a 6–5 lead and sweep the series.

Having made four starts for the A's, he pitched his only career shutout on August 21 against the St. Louis Browns. In spite of this one performance, he began to sputter toward the end of the season, going 2–5 with a 6.36 earned run average in August and September. He was selected off waivers by the Indians with five games left in the season, but did not appear in any games for his new club. He finished the season with an 8–10 record and 3.77 ERA in 36 games for the A's.

== U.S. Navy ==
Ferrick appeared in 31 games for the 1942 Indians, going 3–2 with a 1.99 ERA, which would have led the American League had he pitched more innings. That Christmas, he enlisted in the U.S. Navy and served as a Shipfitter, Third-Class at Naval Station Great Lakes in Lake County, Illinois. While serving in Hawaii in 1944, he played baseball at Kāneʻohe Bay Naval Air Station, and starred in the 1944 Pacific Service World Series between the Navy and U.S. Army. In 1945, Chief Petty Officer Ferrick participated in the Navy's Western Pacific Tour, playing for the fifth fleet team.

== Return to MLB ==
When he returned to the Indians in 1946, he made just nine appearances before being sold to the St. Louis Browns upon new owner Bill Veeck's dismantling of the club.

On August 4, 1946, Ferrick earned both of his first two wins with the Browns in a doubleheader with his former club, the Philadelphia Athletics. After the season, the Browns sold Ferrick to the Washington Senators for a $7500 waiver price. With his new club, he would lose both games of a doubleheader on August 20, 1947. He went 3–12 with a 3.77 ERA over two seasons for a team that finished in seventh place, but was among the league leaders in saves (9 & 10, respectively) both seasons he was in Washington. Following the 1948 season, he was traded back to the Browns with John Sullivan and $25,000 for Sam Dente.

Though the Browns lost 101 games in 1949, Ferrick pitched well out of the bullpen, and was the only pitcher on the squad with a winning record (6-4, 3.88 ERA in 50 games). At the 1950 trade deadline, he, Joe Ostrowski and Leo Thomas were traded to the New York Yankees for Jim Delsing, Don Johnson, Duane Pillette and Snuffy Stirnweiss plus $50,000.

== New York Yankees ==
With a winning ball club for the first time in his career, Ferrick helped the Yankees jumped from a margin of 4.5 games back of the Detroit Tigers to win the American League. He was 1–0 in five appearances against the Tigers, holding them scoreless over a total of 10.2 innings pitched. Overall, Ferrick went 8–4 with a 3.65 ERA and nine saves. He was called by manager Casey Stengel "Our most important individual performer in our drive to the top." He made one appearance in the 1950 World Series against the Philadelphia Phillies, pitching the final inning of game three to earn the win.

Ferrick started the 1951 season with the Yankees, but after poor pitching performances against the Tigers and Red Sox, he was packaged with Bob Porterfield and Fred Sanford, and sent to the Washington Senators for Bob Kuzava.

== Coaching & scouting career ==
Despite the fact that Ferrick pitched respectably in his second go round with the Senators (6-3, 2.73 ERA over 2 seasons), he sought his release at the end of the 1952 season to take on a player/coach role with the Cleveland Indians' triple A affiliate, the Indianapolis Indians in 1953, going 1–1 in 23 games. A season later, when Indianapolis manager Birdie Tebbetts was named manager of the Cincinnati Redlegs, he brought Ferrick along to serve as his pitching coach. He later served as pitching coach for the Philadelphia Phillies (1959), Detroit Tigers (1960–1963) and Kansas City Athletics (1964–1965).

He became chief scout of the A's from 1966 to 1968. In 1969, he joined the expansion Kansas City Royals as a "special assignment scout with emphasis on pitching", and scouted for the club for over twenty years before retiring.

Tom Ferrick is only one of two players who were affiliated with the Athletics in their 3 home cities: in Philadelphia (as a player), in Kansas City (as a coach) and in Oakland (as farm director). (Lew Krausse, Sr also pitched with the Philadelphia Athletics and scouted for the A's in Kansas City and Oakland.)

== Career stats ==
Seasons	W	L	PCT	ERA	G	GS	CG	SHO	SV	IP	H	ER	R	HR	BB	K	BAA	WP	HBP	Fld%	Avg.
9	40	40	.500	3.47	323	7	4	1	56	674	654	260	306	44	227	245	.256	9	1	.953	.184

Ferrick had exceptional control, allowing just 227 walks in 674 innings pitched, and uncorking just nine wild pitches over his nine-year career. The only batter he ever hit with a pitch was Chicago White Sox second baseman Cass Michaels in 1949.

== Personal life ==
Tom Ferrick died from heart failure at age 81 in Lima, Pennsylvania. His son, Tom Jr., is a former newspaper columnist for The Philadelphia Inquirer, and often recounted anecdotes of his father's playing career in his column. He also had another son and four daughters.

Preceded by n/a	Cincinnati Redlegs pitching coach 1954–1958	Succeeded by Clyde King
Preceded by Bill Posedel	Philadelphia Phillies pitching coach 1959	Succeeded by n/a
Preceded by Willis Hudlin	Detroit Tigers pitching coach 1960–1963	Succeeded by Stubby Overmire
Preceded by Eddie Lopat	Kansas City Athletics pitching coach 1964–1965	Succeeded by Cot Deal
