= 1950 Philadelphia Athletics season =

1950 Philadelphia Athletics
- League: American League
- Ballpark: Shibe Park
- City: Philadelphia
- Record: 52–102 (.338)
- League place: 8th
- Owners: Earle Mack & Roy Mack
- General managers: Mickey Cochrane, Art Ehlers
- Managers: Connie Mack
- Television: WPTZ/WCAU/WFIL (George Walsh)
- Radio: WIBG (By Saam, Claude Haring)

The 1950 Philadelphia Athletics season involved the A's finishing eighth in the American League with a record of 52 wins and 102 losses. It would be 87-year-old Connie Mack's 50th and last as A's manager, a North American professional sports record. During that year the team wore uniforms trimmed in blue and gold, in honor of the Golden Jubilee of "The Grand Old Man of Baseball."

== Offseason ==
- December 13, 1949: Ray Coleman, Billy DeMars, Frankie Gustine, Ray Ippolito (minors) and $100,000 were traded by the Athletics to the St. Louis Browns for Bob Dillinger and Paul Lehner.

== Regular season ==
=== Season standings ===
American League
| Team | W | L | Pct. | GB | Home | Road |
|---|---|---|---|---|---|---|
| New York Yankees | 98 | 56 | .636 | — | 53‍–‍24 | 45‍–‍32 |
| Detroit Tigers | 95 | 59 | .617 | 3 | 50‍–‍30 | 45‍–‍29 |
| Boston Red Sox | 94 | 60 | .610 | 4 | 55‍–‍22 | 39‍–‍38 |
| Cleveland Indians | 92 | 62 | .597 | 6 | 49‍–‍28 | 43‍–‍34 |
| Washington Senators | 67 | 87 | .435 | 31 | 35‍–‍42 | 32‍–‍45 |
| Chicago White Sox | 60 | 94 | .390 | 38 | 35‍–‍42 | 25‍–‍52 |
| St. Louis Browns | 58 | 96 | .377 | 40 | 27‍–‍47 | 31‍–‍49 |
| Philadelphia Athletics | 52 | 102 | .338 | 46 | 29‍–‍48 | 23‍–‍54 |

=== Record vs. opponents ===
1950 American League record Sources:
| Team | BOS | CWS | CLE | DET | NYY | PHA | SLB | WSH |
|---|---|---|---|---|---|---|---|---|
| Boston | — | 15–7 | 10–12 | 10–12 | 9–13 | 19–3 | 19–3 | 12–10 |
| Chicago | 7–15 | — | 8–14 | 6–16–2 | 8–14 | 11–11 | 12–10 | 8–14 |
| Cleveland | 12–10 | 14–8 | — | 13–9–1 | 8–14 | 17–5 | 13–9 | 15–7 |
| Detroit | 12–10 | 16–6–2 | 9–13–1 | — | 11–11 | 17–5 | 17–5 | 13–9 |
| New York | 13–9 | 14–8 | 14–8 | 11–11 | — | 15–7 | 17–5 | 14–8–1 |
| Philadelphia | 3–19 | 11–11 | 5–17 | 5–17 | 7–15 | — | 8–14 | 13–9 |
| St. Louis | 3–19 | 10–12 | 9–13 | 5–17 | 5–17 | 14–8 | — | 12–10 |
| Washington | 10–12 | 14–8 | 7–15 | 9–13 | 8–14–1 | 9–13 | 10–12 | — |

=== Roster ===
1950 Philadelphia Athletics
Roster
| Pitchers: 19 Lou Brissie; 26 Moe Burtschy; 36,39 Harry Byrd; 20 Joe Coleman; 25 Dick Fowler; 23 Bob Hooper; 22,34 Alex Kellner; 28 Ed Klieman; 17 Johnny Kucab; 31 Les McCrabb; 21 Joe Murray; 24 Carl Scheib; 30 Bobby Shantz; 36 Hank Wyse | Catchers: 9 Joe Astroth; 37 Mike Guerra; 38 Bob Rinker; 15 Joe Tipton; Infielders: 6 Bob Dillinger; 8 Ferris Fain; 11,41 Billy Hitchcock; 1 Eddie Joost; 14 Gene Markland; 12 Pete Suder; 18,26 Kermit Wahl | Outfielders: 4 Sam Chapman; 3,55 Ben Guintini; 5 Paul Lehner; 7 Wally Moses; 2 Barney McCosky; 28 Roberto Ortiz; 10 Elmer Valo; 3,38 Bob Wellman | Manager: -- Connie Mack; Coaches: 32 Mickey Cochrane; 35 Jimmy Dykes; 29 Dave Keefe; 27 Earle Mack; 33 Bing Miller |

== Player stats ==
| = Indicates team leader |

=== Batting ===
==== Starters by position ====
Note: Pos = Position; G = Games played; AB = At bats; H = Hits; Avg. = Batting average; HR = Home runs; RBI = Runs batted in

| Pos | Player | G | AB | H | Avg. | HR | RBI |
|---|---|---|---|---|---|---|---|
| C | Mike Guerra | 87 | 252 | 71 | .282 | 2 | 26 |
| 1B | Ferris Fain | 151 | 522 | 147 | .282 | 10 | 83 |
| 2B | Billy Hitchcock | 115 | 399 | 109 | .273 | 1 | 54 |
| 3B | Bob Dillinger | 84 | 356 | 110 | .309 | 3 | 41 |
| SS | Eddie Joost | 131 | 476 | 111 | .233 | 18 | 58 |
| OF | Elmer Valo | 129 | 446 | 125 | .280 | 10 | 46 |
| OF | Paul Lehner | 114 | 427 | 132 | .309 | 9 | 52 |
| OF | Sam Chapman | 144 | 553 | 129 | .251 | 23 | 95 |

==== Other batters ====
Note: G = Games played; AB = At bats; H = Hits; Avg. = Batting average; HR = Home runs; RBI = Runs batted in

| Player | G | AB | H | Avg. | HR | RBI |
|---|---|---|---|---|---|---|
| Kermit Wahl | 89 | 280 | 72 | .257 | 2 | 27 |
| Wally Moses | 88 | 265 | 70 | .264 | 2 | 21 |
| Pete Suder | 77 | 248 | 61 | .246 | 8 | 35 |
| Joe Tipton | 64 | 184 | 49 | .266 | 6 | 20 |
| Barney McCosky | 66 | 179 | 43 | .240 | 0 | 11 |
| Joe Astroth | 39 | 110 | 36 | .327 | 1 | 18 |
| Bob Wellman | 11 | 15 | 5 | .333 | 1 | 1 |
| Roberto Ortiz | 6 | 14 | 1 | .071 | 0 | 3 |
| Gene Markland | 5 | 8 | 1 | .125 | 0 | 0 |
| Ben Guintini | 3 | 4 | 0 | .000 | 0 | 0 |
| Bob Rinker | 3 | 3 | 1 | .333 | 0 | 0 |

=== Pitching ===
| = Indicates league leader |

==== Starting pitchers ====
Note: G = Games pitched; IP = Innings pitched; W = Wins; L = Losses; ERA = Earned run average; SO = Strikeouts

| Player | G | IP | W | L | ERA | SO |
|---|---|---|---|---|---|---|
| Lou Brissie | 46 | 246.0 | 7 | 19 | 4.02 | 101 |
| Alex Kellner | 36 | 225.1 | 8 | 20 | 5.47 | 85 |
| Bobby Shantz | 36 | 214.2 | 8 | 14 | 4.61 | 93 |
| Dick Fowler | 11 | 66.2 | 1 | 5 | 6.48 | 15 |

==== Other pitchers ====
Note: G = Games pitched; IP = Innings pitched; W = Wins; L = Losses; ERA = Earned run average; SO = Strikeouts

| Player | G | IP | W | L | ERA | SO |
|---|---|---|---|---|---|---|
| Hank Wyse | 41 | 170.2 | 9 | 14 | 5.85 | 33 |
| Bob Hooper | 45 | 170.1 | 15 | 10 | 5.02 | 58 |
| Joe Coleman | 15 | 54.0 | 0 | 5 | 8.50 | 12 |
| Joe Murray | 8 | 30.0 | 0 | 3 | 5.70 | 8 |
| Johnny Kucab | 4 | 26.0 | 1 | 1 | 3.46 | 8 |

==== Relief pitchers ====
Note: G = Games pitched; W = Wins; L = Losses; SV = Saves; ERA = Earned run average; SO = Strikeouts

| Player | G | W | L | SV | ERA | SO |
|---|---|---|---|---|---|---|
| Carl Scheib | 43 | 3 | 10 | 3 | 7.22 | 37 |
| Moe Burtschy | 9 | 0 | 1 | 0 | 7.11 | 12 |
| Harry Byrd | 6 | 0 | 0 | 0 | 16.88 | 2 |
| Ed Klieman | 5 | 0 | 0 | 0 | 9.53 | 0 |
| Les McCrabb | 2 | 0 | 0 | 0 | 27.00 | 2 |

== Farm system ==
| Level | Team | League | Manager |
|---|---|---|---|
| AAA | Buffalo Bisons | International League | Frank Skaff and Ray Schalk |
| A | Savannah Indians | Sally League | Red Norris |
| A | Lincoln Athletics | Western League | Jimmie DeShong |
| B | Fayetteville Athletics | Carolina League | Mule Haas and Tom Oliver |
| B | West Palm Beach Indians | Florida International League | Clyde Smoll and Rudy Laskowski |
| B | Sunbury Athletics | Interstate League | George Staller |
| C | Youngstown Athletics | Middle Atlantic League | Buck Etchison |
| D | Welch Miners | Appalachian League | Eddie Morgan and Woody Wheaton |
| D | Tarboro Tars | Coastal Plain League | Joe Antolick |
| D | Cordele A's | Georgia–Florida League | Bill Peterman |
| D | Lexington A's | North Carolina State League | Homer Lee Cox |
| D | Portsmouth A's | Ohio–Indiana League | Walt Van Grofski |
| D | Red Springs Red Robins | Tobacco State League | Ducky Detweiler |
