= Old-Timers' Day =

Major League Baseball tradition to honor retired players

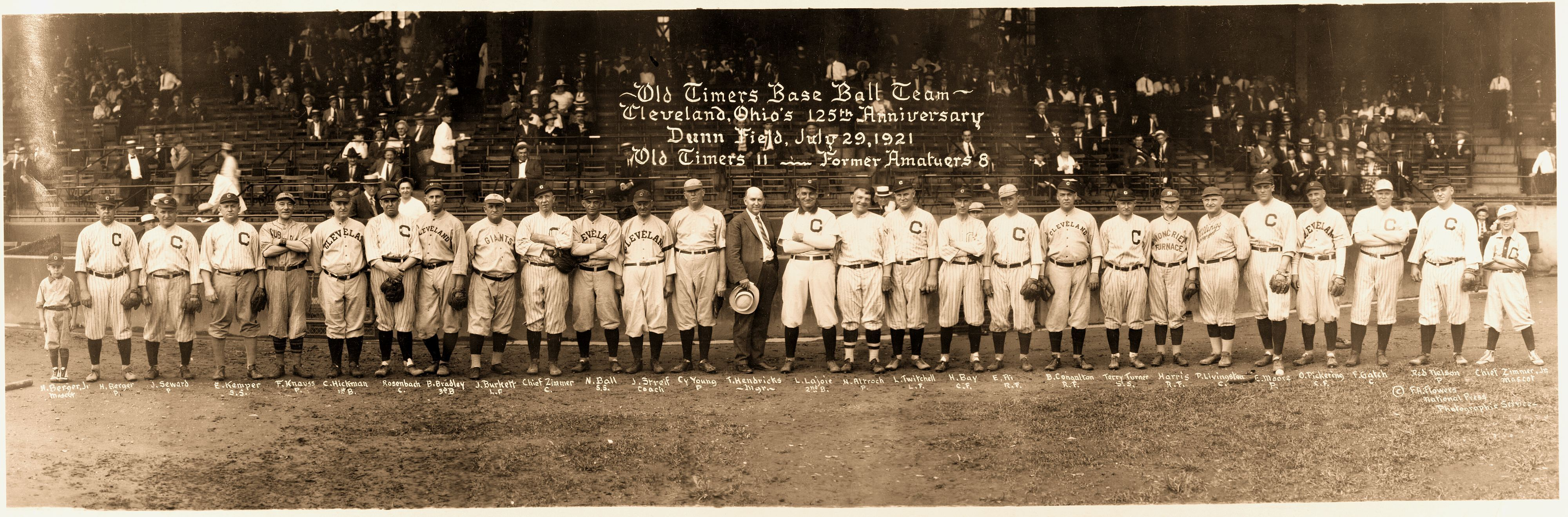
Participants of an old-timers' game held in Cleveland on July 29, 1921

Old-Timers' Day (or old-timers' game) refers to a tradition in Major League Baseball (MLB) where a team devotes the early afternoon preceding a weekend game to honor retired players who played for the organization during their careers. The retired players play in an exhibition game, usually lasting about three innings.

The New York Yankees are currently the only MLB team to host an annual Old-Timers' Day; many other teams have hosted games in the past, and a few continue to do so on a non-regular basis.

== History ==
According to researcher John Thorne, the earliest old-timers' game was held in 1875 at Hoboken, New Jersey's Elysian Fields. Former players, who did not have pensions at the time, organized several more games during the 19th century, often to raise money for indigent or sick former teammates.

As the games grew in popularity, teams started to organize and control the games themselves. These games variously featured reunions of specific teams, alumni of specific franchises from different eras and collections of former stars from different teams. However, as players began receiving better pay during their careers and pensions after their retirement, they had less incentive to participate and old-timers' games started to become less common.

== New York Yankees (1947–present) ==
Through the 2025 event, the New York Yankees have held 77 Old-Timers' Days.

=== Precursor events ===
The Yankees held notable ballpark celebrations to recognize the careers of two of their all-time greats; first for Lou Gehrig on July 4, 1939, several weeks after he was forced into retirement because of ALS, and subsequently for Babe Ruth on June 13, 1948, when he was in the late stages of cancer. Lou Gehrig Appreciation Day remains baseball's most famous such gathering. After hearing tearful speeches from friends and former teammates who had seen his career cut short by the illness which would come to bear his name, Gehrig delivered a short poignant speech, immortalized by his declaration that in spite of his fate he still considered himself the "luckiest man on the face of the earth." Ruth's jersey retirement ceremony was notably captured in a photograph known as Babe Ruth Bows Out, which won the 1949 Pulitzer Prize for Photography.

=== Format ===
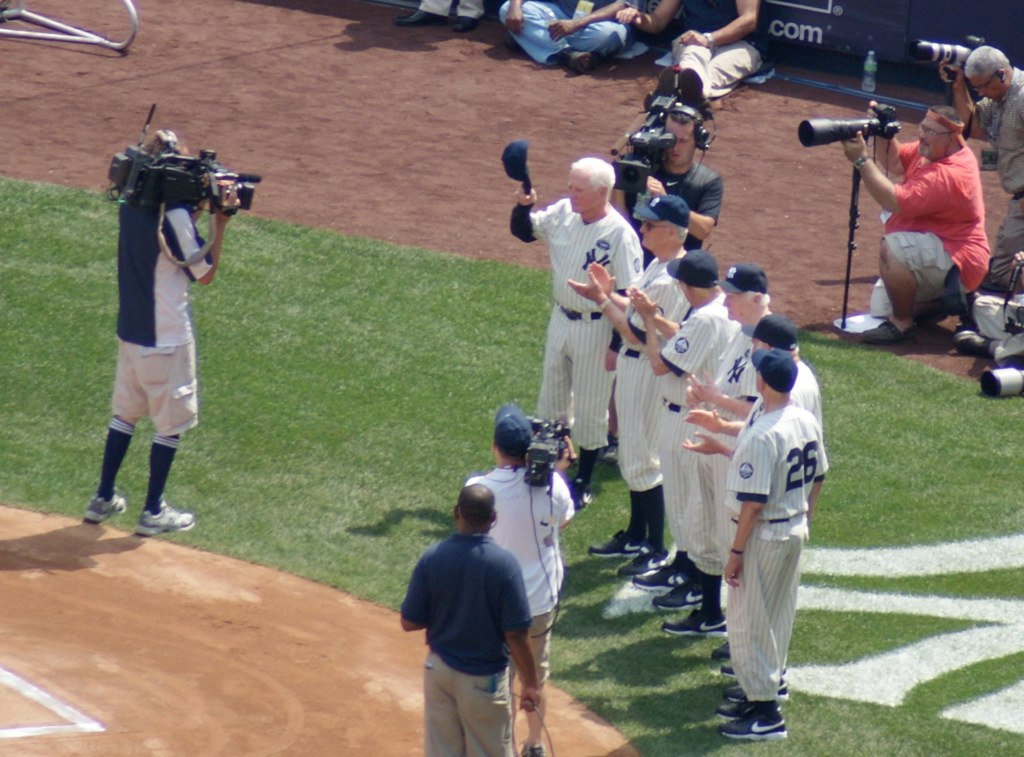
Members of the 1950 New York Yankees being honored at the 2010 Old Timers' Day

The first Old-Timers' Day held under this name took place on the final day of the 1947 season. For many years, players from other teams would attend the festivities wearing their own uniforms. By the 1980s, this practice had stopped and only Yankee players were honored.

Today, the Yankees invite several dozen former ballplayers, including many greats and fan favorites, to be introduced to the crowd. Former coaches and managers, trainers, and broadcasters also participate in the festivities. Hall of Famers and special honorees cap the celebration, with those of the highest standing introduced last. Then participating old-timers are split into two teams, often called the Clippers (after the legendary Joe DiMaggio, the "Yankee Clipper") and the Bombers (homage to the team's legacy as the "Bronx Bombers"), to face one-another in a short exhibition contest. The most guests to attend in one year was 72, in 2008.

During the years he attended, DiMaggio would always be introduced last as "baseball's greatest living player". In 1978, when Billy Martin was introduced after him as part of a stunt announcing he would return as manager in 1980, DiMaggio complained and said if anyone was introduced after him without his permission he would no longer return; it never happened again. He made his final appearance in 1998, missing only the 1988 game due to a scheduling conflict. Since his final appearance, Whitey Ford and Yogi Berra were traditionally the last players introduced. Berra made his final appearance in 2014, and Ford made his last in 2019. With the return of Old Timers’ Day after the COVID pandemic, Mariano Rivera and Derek Jeter have had the honor of being introduced last.

Other elements of the day's ceremonies include a moment of silence for members of the Yankee family who died in the previous year, and introduction of the widows of great Yankees, a tradition that started with Claire Ruth and Eleanor Gehrig attending into the 1970s and 1980s and continues today with Diana Munson, Helen Hunter, Jill Martin, Arlene Howard, Kay Murcer, all escorted by current Yankees players. Ruth's daughter and granddaughter have also been introduced in recent years. Members of the Mantle and Maris families have also been introduced in the past, as well as those who have been recently widowed, such as Jerry Coleman's wife Maggie Coleman, who attended in 2014 after her husband's death.

Mel Allen was the original master of ceremonies, followed by Frank Messer, and then John Sterling and Michael Kay handling the duties as a team. Keith Olbermann and Bob Wolff have also contributed.

A modern addition, started in the past 20 years, involves a few "Old Timers", typically current Yankee broadcasters, being wired for sound to provide running commentary during the game, starting with Bobby Murcer and continuing with Paul O'Neill, David Cone and John Flaherty.

=== Notable moments ===
In 1965, Joe DiMaggio hit a grand slam into the left field stands.

In 1975, while Yankee Stadium was being renovated, the Yankees held Old Timers' Day at Shea Stadium and prior to the game it was announced that Billy Martin had been hired as Yankees' manager for the first time. In 1978, Martin was re-hired on Old Timers' Day.

In 1998, the Yankees celebrated the 20th anniversary of the 1977, 1978 and 1981 World Series that they played against the Los Angeles Dodgers, and invited some members of those Dodger teams. The game was won on a home run by Willie Randolph against Tommy John, who played in all three of those World Series, for the Dodgers in 1977 and 1978 and for the Yankees in 1981, on the losing side each time.

In 2004, Luis Sojo hit the game-winning home run off of Ron Guidry.

In 2010, the Yankees celebrated the 60th anniversary of the 1950 World Series championship team. They invited Hank Workman, Whitey Ford, Jerry Coleman, Don Johnson, Duane Pillette, and Charlie Silvera to represent the team. However, Yogi Berra missed the day due to a fall.

In 2011, Tino Martinez hit a two-run home run off of former teammate David Cone.

In 2016, Hideki Matsui hit a home run off of Cone into the upper deck.

In 2019, Mariano Rivera pitched, played center field (catching a fly ball hit by Sojo), and batted (hitting an inside-the-park home run).

In 2022, the Yankees held an Old-Timers' Day without an exhibition game, due to injuries to several players. No event had been held the prior two seasons, due to the COVID-19 pandemic. Attendees included Ron Guidry, Tino Martinez, Willie Randolph, and Bernie Williams. In 2023, without a game for the second consecutive year, the team hosted a "question-and-answer" session with the 1998 team in honor of that team's 25th anniversary, hosted by radio broadcaster Suzyn Waldman. In 2024, there was again no game played; the event honored the 15th anniversary of the 2009 World Series championship.

In 2025, the Yankees held their 77th Old-Timers' Day, and the first with a game since 2019. During the exhibition, Mariano Rivera suffered a Achilles tendon rupture.

=== Legacy ===
Some players who have been considered "staples" at Old Timers' Day include Bobby Brown, who served as president of the American League for a decade, and Hall of Famers Yogi Berra, Whitey Ford, and Reggie Jackson.

Joe DiMaggio returned in 1952 for his first Old-Timers' Day and returned annually (with the exception of 1988, due to surgery) until his death prior to the 1999 season. The span of 46 years remains the second-longest tenure of any Yankee old-timer. Hector Lopez, who appeared at every Old Timers' Day from 1966 to 2019, surpassed DiMaggio in 2013 with his 47th appearance. Lopez, who died in 2022, holds the Yankee record of 53 appearances.

Don Larsen, David Wells, and David Cone all attended in the late 2000s and 2010s, allowing the Yankees to have all three of their pitchers who (at that point) had thrown a perfect game in the stadium at the same time.

== Boston Red Sox ==
On May 1, 1982, the Boston Red Sox held their first old-timers game at Fenway Park, marking 50-years of ownership by the Yawkey family. It was notable for the participation of 63-year-old Red Sox legend Ted Williams, who made a shoestring catch while playing the outfield.

Starting in 1986, five games were held as part of the annual Equitable Old-Timers Series. The game of May 17, 1986, was themed to commemorate the 40th anniversary of the pennant-winning 1946 Red Sox, and Fenway welcomed back 19 alumni of the team including Williams and Dom DiMaggio. The game also included non-Red Sox alumni, featuring appearances by Dom's brothers, Joe DiMaggio and Vince DiMaggio. The game of May 23, 1987, was themed to celebrate the 75th anniversary of Fenway Park and included the participation of Cleveland Indians pitching great Bob Feller, winning pitcher for the visiting (non-Red Sox) team. The game of May 14, 1988, marked the 40th anniversary of Boston's loss to Cleveland in the 1948 American League tie-breaker game. The game of May 6, 1989, included Carl Yastrzemski, shortly after his election to the Hall of Fame. In the game of May 19, 1990, Boston pitchers Bill Lee, Bill Monbouquette, and Dick Radatz allowed just one hit in the four-inning game.

Starting in 1991, three games were held as part of the annual Heroes of Baseball Series. The game of May 11, 1991, included non-playing appearances by Ted Williams (then 72) and Joe DiMaggio (then 76), in recognition of the 50th anniversary of the 1941 MLB season, when Williams batted .406 and DiMaggio had a 56-game hitting streak. The game of May 16, 1992, marked the 25th anniversary of the 1967 Boston Red Sox season, known as "The Impossible Dream"; participants from the 1967 team included Mike Andrews, Jim Lonborg, Rico Petrocelli, and Carl Yastrzemski. The game of May 29, 1993, honored Negro league legends, and was the final such game held at Fenway until 2018.

The Red Sox held an alumni game at Fenway Park on May 27, 2018, before a regular season game against the Atlanta Braves; it was the Red Sox' first old-timers' game since 1993. Dwight Evans and Luis Tiant acted as managers; the four-inning exhibition was won by Tiant's team, as Julio Lugo hit a two-run homer off of Pedro Martínez for the only runs in the game. Other Red Sox alumni participating included Wade Boggs, Oil Can Boyd, Mike Greenwell, Bill Lee, Derek Lowe, Mike Lowell, and Troy O'Leary.

The Red Sox have not held an alumni game since the 2018 event, nor has team management announced any future plans to do so.

== Old-Timers Baseball Classic (1982–1990) ==
The Cracker Jack Old-Timers Baseball Classic was founded by former Braves executive Dick Cecil, and took place every July from 1982 to 1990. RFK Stadium in Washington, D.C. hosted the events from 1982 to 1987, and Pilot Field in Buffalo hosted the events from 1988 to 1990. Cracker Jack dropped their sponsorship following the 1985 event, after which it became the National Old-Timers Baseball Classic. All of the events were broadcast nationally on ESPN.

The inaugural game, played on the evening of July 19, 1982, was particularly memorable; then-75-year-old Luke Appling connected off Warren Spahn for a home run over the fence in left field, which was at a distance of 275 feet (84 m). Other participants included Hank Aaron, Larry Doby, Lou Brock, Bert Campaneris, Joe DiMaggio, Bob Feller, Harmon Killebrew, Ralph Kiner, Johnny Mize, Stan Musial, Don Newcombe, Enos Slaughter, and Early Wynn. The game was won by the American League, 7–2.

The second game, held on July 18, 1983, was won by the National League, 5–3, and included Richie Ashburn, Al Kaline, Bill Mazeroski, Tim McCarver, Brooks Robinson, Mickey Vernon, and Billy Williams.

In 1984, the third game was held on July 2, with the National League winning 9–4, powered by home runs from Hank Aaron, Johnny Bench, Tom Haller, and Billy Williams.

The fourth game was played on July 1, 1985, as the National League again had four home runs—by Hank Aaron, Bill Mazeroski, Joe Torre, and Tommy Davis—en route to a 7–3 win.

== Old-Timers Series / Heroes of Baseball Series (1986–1995) ==
In February 1986, Commissioner of Baseball Peter Ueberroth announced a series of old-timers games called Equitable Old-Timers Series, to be played at each of the then-26 MLB ballparks and sponsored by Equitable Life Assurance company. These games were unaffiliated with the Old-Timers Baseball Classic games, which were not sanctioned by Major League Baseball.

The Equitable series started at Fenway Park in Boston on May 17, 1986, and concluded at Riverfront Stadium in Cincinnati on September 20. Equitable donated $10,000 per game to a fund for former major leaguers in need. A traveling group of Major League All-Stars served as the visiting team and played an alumni team at each home ballpark location. The series was held again in 1987, starting in St. Louis on May 17 and ending in Detroit on August 30. In 1988, the series started in Boston on May 14 and ended in Detroit on September 18. In 1989, the series again started in Boston, on May 6, and ended in Montreal on September 17. The 1990 series started in Houston on April 9 and again ended in Montreal, on August 26.

In February 1991, it was announced that the Equitable Old-Timers Series would have a new name and new sponsor; the Heroes of Baseball Series would be sponsored by the Upper Deck Company, with a 24-game series starting on April 14 in Minnesota and ending on September 1 in Montreal. Upper Deck donated $10,000 per game to the Baseball Assistance Team. In 1992, the series was played at each of the then-26 MLB ballparks plus Mile High Stadium, the first home of the expansion Colorado Rockies when they joined MLB the following season. The series was also played during the 1993 season, and at some ballparks during the 1994 season. The final game appears to have been played in June 1995 at Dodger Stadium.

== Other old-timers' games ==
The Cleveland Indians held an old-timers' game on July 29, 1921, at Dunn Field (later known as League Park) in Cleveland. Players participating included Neal Ball, Charlie Hickman, Nap Lajoie, Cy Young, and Chief Zimmer.

A 1930 game at Braves Field in Boston was the first to be broadcast nationally on radio.

A New York Giants old-timers' game on July 30, 1950, featured the return, in a non-playing role, of Fred Merkle who had committed a base-running gaffe in 1908 that became well-known as "Merkle's Boner". Merkle received a loud ovation from the crowd.

It is mentioned in Jim Bouton's book Ball Four (a journal of his 1969 season with the Seattle Pilots and the Houston Astros) that the Astros held an Old Timers Day game that year on September 1, which featured their manager Harry Walker. The Astros had previously held an Old Timers Game in 1965 that matched the "Baseball Immortals" against the "Texas All Stars" that was played on September 6, 1965 (Labor Day); the exhibition, consisting of two innings played before the regular season match up of the Astros vs the Chicago Cubs in the Astrodome, featured over a dozen members of the Baseball Hall of Fame from manager Bill McKechnie to Joe Medwick.

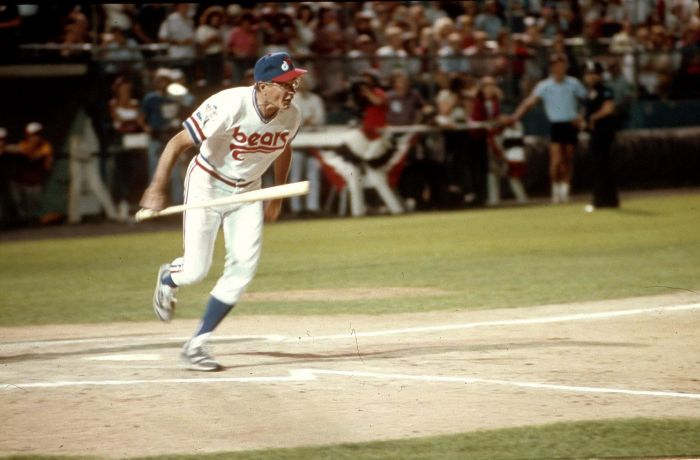
Vice President George H. W. Bush playing in an old-timers' game at Mile High Stadium in July 1984

An old-timers' game was played at Comiskey Park in Chicago on July 5, 1983, during All-Star Game festivities, celebrating the 50th midsummer classic; the 1933 All-Star Game had also been held at Comiskey Park. Notable participants included Ernie Banks, Bobby Doerr, Joe DiMaggio, Burleigh Grimes, Harmon Killebrew, Willie Mays, Frank Robinson, and Hoyt Wilhelm.

In July 1984, an old-timers' game was played at Mile High Stadium in Denver while United States Vice President George H. W. Bush happened to be in town. A spokesman announced that Bush would attend the game but, when the game started, the former Yale Bulldogs baseball player was wearing a Denver Bears uniform and playing first base. He popped up in his only at bat against Warren Spahn.

In 2013, the Los Angeles Dodgers revived their old-timers' game after 18 years of absence.

In 2022, New York Mets owner Steve Cohen announced the team would revive its Old Timers' Day for the first time since 1994. The game celebrated the 60th anniversary of Mets baseball and included members of the 1962 Original Mets, both World Series championship teams, and players from all six decades of the franchise. During the celebration, the team fulfilled former owner Joan Payson's promise to retire Willie Mays' number 24.
