= Bill Sommers =

American baseball player (1923-2000)

- Third baseman/Second baseman
- Born: February 17, 1923; Brooklyn, New York, U.S.
- Died: September 22, 2000 (aged 77); Palm City, Florida, U.S.
- Batted: Right Threw: Right

MLB debut
- April 25, 1950, for the St. Louis Browns

Last MLB appearance
- October 1, 1950, for the St. Louis Browns

MLB statistics
- Batting average: .255
- Home runs: 0
- Runs batted in: 14
- Stats at Baseball Reference

Teams
- St. Louis Browns (1950)

William Dunn Sommers (February 17, 1923 – September 22, 2000) was an American professional baseball third baseman and second baseman, who played with the St. Louis Browns of Major League Baseball in 1950. Listed at 6 feet 0 inches (1.83 m) and 180 pounds (82 kg), Sommers both threw and batted right-handed.

== Career ==
Sommers was signed by the Boston Red Sox in 1942, and played that season for their Class C farm team, the Canton Terriers, batting .277 in 129 games. Baseball records show that he did not play during the 1943 through 1945 seasons, likely due to military service during World War II. In 1946, Sommers played for the Class B Lynn Red Sox, hitting .324 in 121 games. The follow season, he played 140 games and batted .300 for the Class A Scranton Red Sox.

In December 1947, his contract was purchased by the San Antonio Missions, a Double-A affiliate of the St. Louis Browns, as part of a transaction that sent Ellis Kinder from St. Louis to Boston. He played two seasons for the Missions, batting .326 in 153 games during 1948, and .258 in 120 games during 1949.

Sommers spent the 1950 season with the major league St. Louis Browns. He made his major league debut on April 25, as a ninth-inning defensive replacement in a game against the Detroit Tigers. He had his first at bat on May 6, pinch hitting against the Philadelphia Athletics and reaching base on an error. His first hit came on June 1; entering an extra-innings game as a defensive replacement, he had a 12th-inning single off of Connie Marrero of the Washington Senators, which drove in the winning run of the game. His best game at the plate was the second game of an August 11 doubleheader against the Tigers, when he was 3-for-3 and scored both runs in a Browns 2–1 victory. Overall, with the 1950 Browns, Sommers batted .255 with 14 RBIs while appearing in 65 games, making 37 starts at third base and 14 starts at second base.

Newspaper accounts show that Sommers played for a time during 1951 with the unaffiliated semi-professional Brooklyn Bushwicks.
