= Cuddles Marshall =

American baseball player (1925-2007)

- Pitcher
- Born: April 28, 1925; Bellingham, Washington, US
- Died: December 14, 2007 (aged 82); Santa Clarita, California, US
- Batted: Right Threw: Right

MLB debut
- April 24, 1946, for the New York Yankees

Last MLB appearance
- September 30, 1950, for the St. Louis Browns

MLB statistics
- Win–loss record: 7–7
- Earned run average: 5.98
- Strikeouts: 69
- Stats at Baseball Reference

Teams
- New York Yankees (1946, 1948–1949); St. Louis Browns (1950)

Clarence Westly Marshall (April 28, 1925 – December 14, 2007), nicknamed "Cuddles", was an American professional baseball pitcher. He played in Major League Baseball as a relief pitcher for the New York Yankees and St. Louis Browns between 1946 and 1950.

== Early life ==
Clarence Westly Marshall was born in Bellingham, Washington, on April 28, 1925. He attended Bellingham High School, where he played for the school's baseball and basketball teams. He was also a sports reporter and the sports editor for the school's newspaper. Marshall also played baseball at the semi-professional level for the Bellingham Bells while he was in high school.

In 1943, Marshall's senior year at Bellingham High, he had a 9–1 win–loss record and did not allow an earned run. He threw a no-hitter in April 1943. His older brother, John, also played baseball at Bellingham High.

== Professional career ==
After he graduated from Bellingham High in 1943, Marshall signed with the Seattle Rainiers of the Pacific Coast League (PCL), and he made his professional debut as a relief pitcher. He returned to Seattle in 1944, but the Rainiers optioned him to the Memphis Chickasaws of the Southern Association.

After the 1944 season, the Rainiers traded Marshall to the New York Yankees for Johnny Babich and Dick Hearn. The Yankees assigned Marshall to the Kansas City Blues of the Class AA American Association for the 1945 season. Marshall made the Yankees' roster in 1946, and he made his major league debut on April 24. On May 28, Marshall started the first night game at Yankee Stadium. It was his first game started at the major league level. He had a 3–4 record and a 5.33 earned run average (ERA) for the Yankees in 1946.

The Yankees assigned Marshall to Kansas City in 1947 and in 1948. He was traded to the Newark Bears of the Class AAA International League in May 1948 for Don Johnson. He made one appearance for the Yankees in 1948; he pitched one inning and walked three batters. Marshall spent the entire 1949 season with the Yankees. He had a 3–0 record and a 5.11 ERA in 1949. The Yankees won the 1949 World Series; though he did not appear in the series, he received a World Series ring.

Marshall opened the 1950 season with the Yankees, but was on the cutting block as a mid-May deadline loomed for the Yankees to reduce their roster size. On May 15, 1950, the St. Louis Browns purchased Marshall from the Yankees. He had a 1–3 record with a 7.88 ERA for the Browns in 1950.

After the 1950 season, Marshall passed a physical examination by the United States Army. Anticipating that he would be drafted, the Browns released him to the Toronto Maple Leafs of the International League. He was drafted, and the Army stationed him at Fort Lewis in Tacoma, Washington, before he was sent overseas to Austria. He returned to the United States before the 1953 season, and signed with the Browns. The Baltimore Orioles of the International League purchased Marshall on a 30-day trial basis, but returned him to the Browns. In June 1953, he was released by the Browns and he signed with the Hollywood Stars of the PCL. He was released by Hollywood and signed with the Vancouver Mounties of the Western International League. In his second appearance for Vancouver, Marshall threw a no-hitter, though he walked nine batters in the game.

After the 1953 season, Marshall was involved in a car accident in Bellingham where the car collided with a telephone pole, killing the driver of the car. Marshall was hospitalized in serious condition. He broke his left leg and had hand and wrist injuries. He decided to retire from baseball following the accident. Marshall compiled a 7–7 win–loss record and a career ERA of 5.98 in 73 appearances in the major leagues. He also had four saves. Over his career, he walked 158 batters while striking out but 69.

=== Nickname ===
During his career, Marshall drew attention for his looks. He was once referred to as the "handsomest twirler on the staff" of the Yankees. In 1946, a reporter overheard other Yankees players trying to come up with a nickname for Marshall, when Joe Page joked about how girls wanted to "cuddle" with Marshall. The reporter began to refer to Marshall as "Cuddles". Marshall initially did not like the nickname, but according to his daughter, he came to appreciate it later in his life.

In 1946, newspapers pointed out the resemblance between Marshall and actor Tyrone Power. After the 1946 season, movie studio Metro-Goldwyn-Mayer offered Marshall a contract for $250 per week ($4,031 in current dollar terms) for 50 weeks and options for six years at up to $1,200 per week ($19,349 in current dollar terms). He declined the offer, as he wanted to continue his baseball career.

== Personal life ==
During the baseball offseasons, Marshall took courses at Western Washington University. After his retirement, he worked as a financial analyst for Litton Industries for 27 years. He also had second jobs in a liquor store and as a security guard at Dodger Stadium.

Marshall married Margaret Zuzow on June 30, 1951. They had two daughters. After his retirement from baseball, they moved to Simi Valley, California. Margaret died in 1976, and Marshall moved to Saugus, Santa Clarita, California, after her death.

Marshall died in his home on December 14, 2007. He was buried at Assumption Catholic Cemetery in Simi Valley in his Yankees uniform.
