= Duane Pillette =

American baseball player (1922-2011)

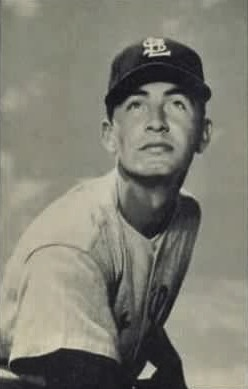
- Pillette in 1953
- Pitcher
- Born: July 24, 1922; Detroit, Michigan, U.S.
- Died: May 6, 2011 (aged 88); San Jose, California, U.S.
- Batted: Right Threw: Right

MLB debut
- July 19, 1949, for the New York Yankees

Last MLB appearance
- September 16, 1956, for the Philadelphia Phillies

MLB statistics
- Win–loss record: 38–66
- Earned run average: 4.40
- Strikeouts: 305
- Stats at Baseball Reference

Teams
- New York Yankees (1949–1950); St. Louis Browns / Baltimore Orioles (1950–1955); Philadelphia Phillies (1956)

Duane Xavier "Dee" Pillette (July 24, 1922 – May 6, 2011) was an American professional baseball pitcher, who played all or part of eight seasons in Major League Baseball (MLB) for four different teams from 1949 through 1956. Listed at 6 ft 3 in (1.91 m), 195 lb (88 kg), Pillette batted and threw right-handed. He attended Santa Clara University.

Born in Detroit, Michigan, Duane Pillette was a second-generation major league pitcher as his father, Herman Pillette, hurled for the Cincinnati Reds and Detroit Tigers between the 1917 and 1924 seasons. Herman won a career-high 19 games in 1922, the year Duane was born.

Pillette entered the majors in 1949 with the New York Yankees, playing for them for two years. In his rookie season, he posted a 2–4 record and a 4.34 earned run average (ERA) in 12 games for the World Champion Yankees.

During the 1950 midseason, New York sent Pillette to the St. Louis Browns along with Jim Delsing, Don Johnson, Snuffy Stirnweiss, and cash considerations in exchange for Tom Ferrick, Joe Ostrowski, and Leo Thomas. In 1951, while pitching for the Browns, Pillette led the American League (AL) in losses with 14, joining his father Herm, who also led the league with 19 losses while pitching for the 1923 Tigers.

Pillette pitched for the Browns until 1953, and was part of the Orioles from 1954 to 1955 after the franchise moved to Baltimore, Maryland. He was the last starting pitcher in the final Browns game, suffering the loss in an eleven-inning pitching duel against Billy Pierce and the Chicago White Sox, when Minnie Miñoso knocked in the winning run in the top of the eleventh in a 2–1 game. Then, in 1954 he became the first winning pitcher in Orioles history after throwing a complete game, 3–2 victory against the Detroit Tigers.

Pillette opened 1956 with the Buffalo Bisons of the International League, being traded to the Philadelphia Phillies late in the season. After that, he pitched in the minors until 1960.

Pillette was a longtime resident of San Jose, California; on May 6, 2011, he died at the age of 88.

Pitching statistics

W	L	W-L%	ERA	GP	GS	GF	CG	SH	SV	IP	H	RA	ER	HR	BB	SO	HBP	BK	WP	WHIP
38	66	.365	4.40	188	119	25	34	4	2	904	985	498	442	67	391	305	17	2	15	1.52

== See also ==
- List of second-generation Major League Baseball players
