= Fred Sanford (baseball) =

American baseball player (1919–2011)

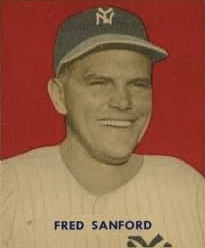
- Sanford's 1949 Bowman Gum baseball card
- Pitcher
- Born: August 9, 1919; Garfield, Utah, U.S.
- Died: March 15, 2011 (aged 91); Salt Lake City, Utah, U.S.
- Batted: Both Threw: Right

MLB debut
- May 5, 1943, for the St. Louis Browns

Last MLB appearance
- September 14, 1951, for the St. Louis Browns

MLB statistics
- Win–loss record: 37–55
- Earned run average: 4.45
- Strikeouts: 285
- Stats at Baseball Reference

Teams
- St. Louis Browns (1943, 1946–1948, 1951); New York Yankees (1949–1951); Washington Senators (1951)

Career highlights and awards
- World Series champion (1949, 1950)

John Frederick Sanford (August 9, 1919 – March 15, 2011) was a Major League Baseball pitcher.

== St. Louis Browns ==
Sanford signed with the St. Louis Browns in 1939. Despite having made three appearances with the Browns in 1943, he was essentially a career minor leaguer with a 55–61 record and 3.74 earned run average in the Browns' farm system when his career was interrupted by service in World War II. He returned to the Browns in 1946, and went 15–10 with a 2.74 ERA for the Toledo Mud Hens to earn a September call up to St. Louis. He pitched shutouts in his first two major league starts against the New York Yankees and Chicago White Sox.

His success against the Yankees was fleeting, as he allowed successive home runs to Charlie Keller, Joe DiMaggio and Johnny Lindell during a relief appearance against the Yanks during the 1947 season. Still, he pitched well enough against them to catch the eye of Yankees General Manager George Weiss. At the 1948 Winter meetings, he and Roy Partee were dealt to the Yankees for Red Embree, Sherm Lollar and Dick Starr plus $100,000.

== New York Yankees ==
Having pitched 227 innings and appeared in 42 games with the Browns in 1948, Sanford's role with the Yankees was far more limited, as he pitched just 95.1 innings for the "Bronx Bombers" in 1949. Still, he proved to be a very important piece for the Yankees down the stretch, as he went 3–0 with a 2.31 ERA in the month of September to help hold off the surging Boston Red Sox, and win the American League by a game. Sanford did not make an appearance in the 1949 World Series against the Brooklyn Dodgers.

Sanford's name came up in trade rumors early in the 1950 season, as the Yankees were in need of left-handed pitching. He responded to these rumors by getting off to a 4–0 start; shortly after which, the Yankees acquired left hander Joe Ostrowski from the Browns without departing with Sanford. From that point forward, Sanford's record fell to 1–4 with a 5.40 ERA. Having been a starter in the early part of the season, Sanford was demoted to the bullpen in June, making just one spot start in August. The Yankees returned to the World Series in 1950, however, Sanford was once again kept out of all four games with the Philadelphia Phillies. The Yankees won the World Series both seasons Sanford was with the club, but he did not make a postseason appearance.

== Final season ==
At the 1951 trade deadline, he, Tom Ferrick and Bob Porterfield were traded to the Washington Senators for Bob Kuzava. Unhappy with the Yankees, Sanford was exceptional in his first start with his new club, retiring fourteen batters in a row at one point to earn the win. He went 1–3 with a 7.89 ERA in his next six starts, and was traded back to the St. Louis Browns. This time he was traded for fellow right hander Dick Starr even up. He went 2–4 with a 10.21 ERA for the last place club that lost 102 games that season. He spent two seasons with the Portland Beavers after his major league career ended, going 24–20 with a 3.62 ERA.

== Career stats ==
W	L	PCT	ERA	G	GS	CG	SHO	SV	IP	H	ER	ERA+	R	HR	BB	K	WP	HBP	BA	Fld%	RF/9	E
37	55	.402	4.45	94	164	98	26	3	6	744	768	368	405	67	391	285	10	3	.170	.961	2.09	7

Perhaps Sanford's most outstanding ability was his fielding; in 1948 he committed only four errors in 42 games (second best in the league). In 1950 and 1951 he committed no errors at all, and in 1950 he was second among pitchers in range factor per nine innings. His career ERA+ was 94, meaning he was approximately six percent worse than average in allowing earned runs relative to his era, stadiums, and league. He led the league with 21 losses in 1948, however, he "ate up innings" for the lowly Browns. He was fourth in the league with 33 starts and seventh in innings pitched. His only career home run came off the Cleveland Indians' Bob Lemon on July 9, 1948.
