= Ben Guintini =

American baseball player (1919–1998)

- Outfielder / Pinch hitter
- Born: January 13, 1919; Los Banos, California, U.S.
- Died: December 2, 1998 (aged 79); Roseville, California, U.S.
- Batted: Right Threw: Right

MLB debut
- April 21, 1946, for the Pittsburgh Pirates

Last MLB appearance
- April 30, 1950, for the Philadelphia Athletics

MLB statistics
- Batting average: .000
- Home runs: 0
- Runs batted in: 0
- Stats at Baseball Reference

Teams
- Pittsburgh Pirates (1946); Philadelphia Athletics (1950)

Benjamin John Guintini (January 13, 1919 – December 2, 1998) was an American professional baseball outfielder. He briefly played in Major League Baseball (MLB) for the Pittsburgh Pirates (1946) and Philadelphia Athletics (1950). He went hitless in seven total MLB at bats.

The native of Los Banos, California threw and batted right-handed; he stood 6 feet 1 inch (1.85 m) tall and weighed 190 pounds (86 kg). A World War II veteran of the United States Army, he played more than 1,000 games in the minor leagues during his ten-season career (1940–1941; 1944–1951), and was named to the 1949 Texas League all-star team, a season during which Guintini reached a career high with 32 home runs. All told, Guintini hit 99 homers as a minor leaguer and played for five Pacific Coast League teams.
