= Ribs Raney =

American baseball player (1923-2003)

- Pitcher
- Born: February 16, 1923; Detroit, Michigan, US
- Died: July 7, 2003 (aged 80); Warren, Michigan, US
- Batted: Right Threw: Right

MLB debut
- September 18, 1949, for the St. Louis Browns

Last MLB appearance
- April 22, 1950, for the St. Louis Browns

MLB statistics
- Win–loss record: 1–3
- Earned run average: 7.36
- Strikeouts: 7
- Stats at Baseball Reference

Teams
- St. Louis Browns (1949–1950)

Frank Robert Donald "Ribs" Raney (born Raniszewski, February 16, 1923 – July 7, 2003) was an American professional baseball player, a right-handed pitcher who appeared in four Major League games for the St. Louis Browns during the 1949–1950 seasons. Born in Detroit, Michigan, he stood a rangy 6 feet 4 inches (1.93 m) tall and weighed 190 pounds (86 kg).

Raney attended Western Michigan University. His playing career lasted for ten season, 1941–1943 and 1946–1952. He missed both 1944 and 1945 while serving in the United States Navy in World War II.

His MLB career consisted of three starting assignments at the tail end of the 1949 season, and one relief appearance during the opening weeks of 1950. On October 1, 1949, he earned his only big-league victory, hurling a complete game, 8–6 triumph over the Chicago White Sox at Sportsman's Park. Raney prevailed despite allowing ten hits, six bases on balls, and five earned runs.

All told, in 181/3 Major League innings pitched, he gave up 25 hits and 14 walks, with seven strikeouts.

Raney pitched in 268 minor league games, most of them in the Browns' farm system.
