= Gene Markland =

American baseball player (1919-1999)

- Second baseman
- Born: December 26, 1919; Detroit, Michigan, U.S.
- Died: June 15, 1999 (aged 79); Barefoot Bay, Florida, U.S.
- Batted: Right Threw: Right

MLB debut
- April 25, 1950, for the Philadelphia Athletics

Last MLB appearance
- May 7, 1950, for the Philadelphia Athletics

MLB statistics
- Batting average: .125
- Home runs: 0
- Runs batted in: 0
- Stats at Baseball Reference

Teams
- Philadelphia Athletics (1950)

Cleneth Eugene Markland (December 26, 1919 – June 15, 1999) was an American Major League Baseball infielder. Nicknamed "Mousey", he appeared in five games for the Philadelphia Athletics during the outset of the 1950 season, but had a nine-year, 1,169-game career in minor league baseball. The native of Detroit, Michigan, stood 5 feet 10 inches (1.78 m) tall and weighed 160 pounds (73 kg). He threw and batted right-handed.

Markland's pro career began in 1939 in his hometown Detroit Tigers' organization, but his career was interrupted by four full years of United States Army service during World War II. He returned to baseball in 1946 and, after a stellar 1949 season with the Triple-A Buffalo Bisons—he hit 25 home runs, batted .305, had 95 runs batted in, and was selected as the third baseman on the International League All-Star Team—Markland received his only Major League trial with the 1950 Athletics.

A rookie at age 30, he made his debut April 25 as a late-inning replacement for second baseman Kermit Wahl, and singled in his first big-league at bat against Vic Raschi of the New York Yankees. He appeared in four more games for the A's, starting three of them at second base, but collected no more hits, although he notched three bases on balls and scored two runs.

He then returned to the minor leagues for the rest of 1950 and all of 1951 before leaving the game.
