= Jim Brideweser =

American baseball player (1927–1989)

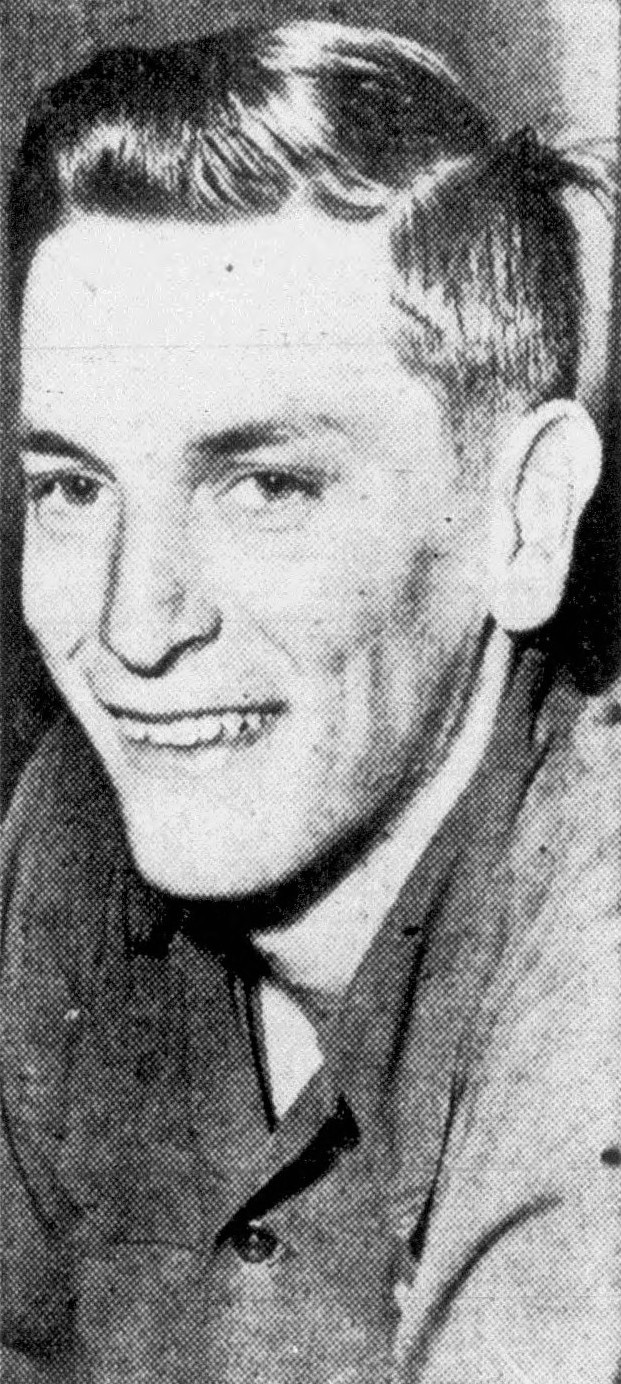
- Brideweser, circa 1945
- Shortstop
- Born: February 13, 1927; Lancaster, Ohio, U.S.
- Died: August 25, 1989 (aged 62); Lake Forest, California, U.S.
- Batted: Right Threw: Right

MLB debut
- September 29, 1951, for the New York Yankees

Last MLB appearance
- September 21, 1957, for the Baltimore Orioles

MLB statistics
- Batting average: .252
- Home runs: 1
- Runs batted in: 50
- Stats at Baseball Reference

Teams
- New York Yankees (1951–1953); Baltimore Orioles (1954); Chicago White Sox (1955–1956); Detroit Tigers (1956); Baltimore Orioles (1957)

James Ehrenfeld Brideweser (February 13, 1927 – August 25, 1989) was an American shortstop in Major League Baseball who played from 1951 to 1957 for the New York Yankees, Baltimore Orioles, Chicago White Sox and Detroit Tigers. He was 6 ft 0 in (1.83 m) tall but weighed only 165 pounds.

Before being signed by the Yankees before the 1950 season, Bridewiser spent time in the United States Army during the World War II era and attended the University of Southern California. On August 2, 1945, he enlisted in the army.

He made his big league debut on September 29, 1951 for the Yankees. He spent three years with them, playing in only 51 games but batting a solid .327 in 49 at bats.

He was purchased by the Orioles in May 1954, and he hit .265 in 73 games with them. After the season, he was traded by the Orioles with Bob Chakales and Clint Courtney to the White Sox for Don Ferrarese, Don Johnson, Matt Batts, and Fred Marsh.

He did poorly while with the White Sox. He spent 1955 and part of 1956 with them, batting only .203 in 69 at bats total. In May 1956, he was traded by the White Sox with Harry Byrd and Bob Kennedy to the Tigers for Fred Hatfield and Jim Delsing. He did not improve much with them, hitting only .218 in 156 at bats. Overall that year, he hit .216.

He played his final season in 1957 with the Orioles, who purchased him from the Tigers in February of that year. He hit .268 in his final season, belting the only home run of his career that year – a three-run shot off of Boston Red Sox pitcher Frank Sullivan. He played his final game on September 21, 1957.

Overall, he hit .252 in his career. In 329 games, he collected 156 hits in 620 at bats, scoring 79 runs and driving in 50. He doubled 22 times, tripled six times and homered once. He walked 63 times and struck out only 77 times. He had a great eye at the plate, striking out only 12.4% of the time.

His fielding percentage was .949.

After he retired from playing, he obtained teaching credentials. He taught mathematics at Redondo Union High School in Redondo Beach, California and, as coach of the varsity baseball team, had at least two championship seasons. He was also a Title IX counselor.
