= 1950 Cleveland Indians season =

1950 Cleveland Indians
- League: American League
- Ballpark: Cleveland Municipal Stadium
- City: Cleveland, Ohio
- Owners: Ellis Ryan
- General managers: Hank Greenberg
- Managers: Lou Boudreau
- Television: WXEL (Jack Graney, Jimmy Dudley)
- Radio: WERE (Jack Graney, Jimmy Dudley)

The 1950 Cleveland Indians season was the 50th season in franchise history. The team finished fourth in the American League with a record of 92–62, six games behind the New York Yankees.

== Offseason ==
- December 5, 1949: Grant Dunlap was drafted from the Indians by the St. Louis Browns in the 1949 minor league draft.
- February 17, 1950: Satchel Paige was released by the Indians.

== Regular season ==
In 1950, the Cleveland Indians became the first Major League Baseball franchise to use a bullpen car. Rookie Al Rosen led the American League in home runs with 37.

=== Season standings ===
American League
Team	W	L	Pct.	GB	Home	Road
New York Yankees	98	56	.636	—	53‍–‍24	45‍–‍32
Detroit Tigers	95	59	.617	3	50‍–‍30	45‍–‍29
Boston Red Sox	94	60	.610	4	55‍–‍22	39‍–‍38
Cleveland Indians	92	62	.597	6	49‍–‍28	43‍–‍34
Washington Senators	67	87	.435	31	35‍–‍42	32‍–‍45
Chicago White Sox	60	94	.390	38	35‍–‍42	25‍–‍52
St. Louis Browns	58	96	.377	40	27‍–‍47	31‍–‍49
Philadelphia Athletics	52	102	.338	46	29‍–‍48	23‍–‍54

=== Record vs. opponents ===
1950 American League record Sources:
Team	BOS	CWS	CLE	DET	NYY	PHA	SLB	WSH
Boston	—	15–7	10–12	10–12	9–13	19–3	19–3	12–10
Chicago	7–15	—	8–14	6–16–2	8–14	11–11	12–10	8–14
Cleveland	12–10	14–8	—	13–9–1	8–14	17–5	13–9	15–7
Detroit	12–10	16–6–2	9–13–1	—	11–11	17–5	17–5	13–9
New York	13–9	14–8	14–8	11–11	—	15–7	17–5	14–8–1
Philadelphia	3–19	11–11	5–17	5–17	7–15	—	8–14	13–9
St. Louis	3–19	10–12	9–13	5–17	5–17	14–8	—	12–10
Washington	10–12	14–8	7–15	9–13	8–14–1	9–13	10–12	—

=== Notable transactions ===
- April 3, 1950: Mike Tresh was released by the Indians.
- May 11, 1950: Grant Dunlap was returned to the Indians by the St. Louis Browns.
- June 14, 1950: Mickey Vernon was traded by the Indians to the Washington Senators for Dick Weik.

=== Opening Day Lineup ===
Opening Day Starters
#	Name	Position
34	Dale Mitchell	LF
14	Larry Doby	CF
3	Mickey Vernon	1B
9	Luke Easter	RF
4	Joe Gordon	2B
5	Lou Boudreau	SS
7	Al Rosen	3B
10	Jim Hegan	C
21	Bob Lemon	P

=== Roster ===
1950 Cleveland Indians
Roster
Pitchers: 17 Al Aber; 30 Gene Bearden; 22 Al Benton; 19 Bob Feller; 23 Jesse Flores; 25 Mike Garcia; 27 Steve Gromek; 21 Bob Lemon; 18 Marino Pieretti; 26 Dick Rozek; 28 Dick Weik; 24 Early Wynn; 20 Sam Zoldak	Catchers: 10 Jim Hegan; 12 Ray Murray; Infielders: 1 Bobby Ávila; 2 Johnny Berardino; 8 Ray Boone; 5 Lou Boudreau; 11 Herb Conyers; 9 Luke Easter; 4 Joe Gordon; 7 Al Rosen; 3 Mickey Vernon	Outfielders: 31 Allie Clark; 14 Larry Doby; 33 Bob Kennedy; 30 Jim Lemon; 34 Dale Mitchell; 38 Thurman Tucker	Manager: 5 Lou Boudreau; Coaches: 43 Mel Harder (Pitching); 41 Ski Melillo; 42 Muddy Ruel (Bullpen); 44 Al Simmons (Third Base)

== Player stats ==
= Indicates team leader

= Indicates league leader

=== Batting ===
==== Starters by position ====
Note: Pos = Position; G = Games played; AB = At bats; H = Hits; Avg. = Batting average; HR = Home runs; RBI = Runs batted in

Pos	Player	G	AB	H	Avg.	HR	RBI
C	Jim Hegan	131	415	91	.219	14	58
1B	Luke Easter	141	540	151	.280	28	107
2B	Joe Gordon	119	368	87	.236	19	57
SS	Ray Boone	109	365	110	.301	7	58
3B	Al Rosen	155	554	159	.287	37	116
OF	Bob Kennedy	146	540	157	.291	9	54
OF	Larry Doby	142	503	164	.326	25	102
OF	Dale Mitchell	130	506	156	.308	3	49

==== Other batters ====
Note: G = Games played; AB = At bats; H = Hits; Avg. = Batting average; HR = Home runs; RBI = Runs batted in

Player	G	AB	H	Avg.	HR	RBI
Lou Boudreau	81	260	70	.269	1	29
Bobby Avila	80	201	60	.299	1	21
Allie Clark	59	163	35	.215	6	21
Ray Murray	55	139	38	.273	1	13
Thurman Tucker	57	101	18	.178	1	7
Mickey Vernon	28	90	17	.189	0	10
Jim Lemon	12	34	6	.176	1	1
Herb Conyers	7	9	3	.333	1	1
Johnny Berardino	4	5	2	.400	0	3

=== Pitching ===
= Indicates league leader

==== Starting pitchers ====
Note: G = Games pitched; IP = Innings pitched; W = Wins; L = Losses; ERA = Earned run average; SO = Strikeouts

Player	G	IP	W	L	ERA	SO
Bob Lemon	44	288.0	23	11	3.84	170
Bob Feller	35	247.0	16	11	3.43	119
Early Wynn	32	213.2	18	8	3.20	143
Mike Garcia	33	184.0	11	11	3.86	76
Al Aber	1	9.0	1	0	2.00	4

==== Other pitchers ====
Note: G = Games pitched; IP = Innings pitched; W = Wins; L = Losses; ERA = Earned run average; SO = Strikeouts

Player	G	IP	W	L	ERA	SO
Steve Gromek	31	113.1	10	7	3.65	43
Gene Bearden	14	45.1	1	3	6.15	10

==== Relief pitchers ====
Note: G = Games pitched; W = Wins; L = Losses; SV = Saves; ERA = Earned run average; SO = Strikeouts

Player	G	W	L	SV	ERA	SO
Al Benton	36	4	2	4	3.57	26
Sam Zoldak	33	4	2	4	3.96	15
Marino Pieretti	29	0	1	1	4.18	11
Jesse Flores	28	3	3	4	3.74	27
Dick Rozek	12	0	0	0	4.97	14
Dick Weik	11	1	3	0	3.81	16

== Awards and honors ==
- Al Rosen, American League leader, home runs (37)

== Farm system ==
Level	Team	League	Manager
AAA	San Diego Padres	Pacific Coast League	Del Baker
AA	Oklahoma City Indians	Texas League	Joe Vosmik, Hank Gowdy and Tommy Reis
A	Dayton Indians	Central League	Dolph Camilli
A	Wilkes-Barre Barons	Eastern League	Bill Norman
B	Cedar Rapids Indians	Illinois–Indiana–Iowa League	Billy Jurges
B	Harrisburg Senators	Interstate League	Les Bell
B	Spartanburg Peaches	Tri-State League	Kerby Farrell
B	Tacoma Tigers	Western International League	Jim Brillheart
C	Tucson Cowboys	Arizona–Texas League	Hank Leiber
C	Bakersfield Indians	California League	Harry Griswold
C	Pittsfield Indians	Canadian–American League	Lloyd Brown
D	Daytona Beach Islanders	Florida State League	Red Ruffing
D	Zanesville Indians	Ohio–Indiana League	Knowles Piercy
D	Batavia Clippers	PONY League	Ed Kobesky
D	Green Bay Blue Jays	Wisconsin State League	Phil Seghi

LEAGUE CHAMPIONS: Wilkes-Barre
