= Dave Madison =

American baseball player (1921–1985)

- Pitcher
- Born: February 1, 1921; Brooksville, Mississippi, U.S.
- Died: December 8, 1985 (aged 64); Macon, Mississippi, U.S.
- Batted: Right Threw: Right

MLB debut
- September 26, 1950, for the New York Yankees

Last MLB appearance
- August 20, 1953, for the Detroit Tigers

MLB statistics
- Win–loss record: 8–7
- Earned run average: 5.70
- Strikeouts: 70
- Stats at Baseball Reference

Teams
- New York Yankees (1950); St. Louis Browns (1952); Detroit Tigers (1952–1953)

David Pledger Madison (February 1, 1921 – December 8, 1985) was an American professional baseball pitcher in Major League Baseball (MLB) who played in 1950, 1952 and 1953 for the New York Yankees, St. Louis Browns and Detroit Tigers. Born in Brooksville, Mississippi, he was an alumnus of Louisiana State University. Madison batted and threw right-handed, and was listed at 6 feet 3 inches (1.91 m) tall and 190 pounds (86 kg).

Madison's career as a professional player extended from 1947 to 1955. Originally signed by the Yankees, he appeared in only one game for them, as a relief pitcher in the closing days of the 1950 season. He served in the United States Army during the Korean War in 1951 and was discharged in time for the 1952 season. On April 7, just prior to the opening of the 1952 baseball season, his contract was sold to the Browns. Madison then spent the entire seasons of 1952–53 in the big leagues with the Browns and Tigers, mostly as a relief pitcher, although he started six games.

In 74 total big-league games and 158 innings pitched, Madison allowed 173 hits and 103 bases on balls, with 70 strikeouts to his credit. He briefly managed in the lower levels of the Yankees' farm system, then served as a longtime scout. He died in Macon, Mississippi, at age 64.
