= Dick Starr =

American baseball player (1921-2017)

- Pitcher
- Born: March 2, 1921; Kittanning, Pennsylvania, U.S.
- Died: January 18, 2017 (aged 95); Kittanning, Pennsylvania, U.S.
- Batted: Right Threw: Right

MLB debut
- September 5, 1947, for the New York Yankees

Last MLB appearance
- September 29, 1951, for the Washington Senators

MLB statistics
- Win–loss record: 12–24
- Earned run average: 5.25
- Strikeouts: 120
- Stats at Baseball Reference

Teams
- New York Yankees (1947–1948); St. Louis Browns (1949–1951); Washington Senators (1951)

Richard Eugene Starr (March 2, 1921 – January 18, 2017) was an American Major League Baseball pitcher born in Kittanning, Pennsylvania. Listed at 6 ft 3 in (1.91 m), 190 lb (86 kg), he batted and threw right-handed.

== New York Yankees ==
Starr signed with the New York Yankees in 1941, and went a combined 32–12 with a 4.00 earned run average for the Butler Yankees over two seasons. He missed the 1943 through 1945 seasons serving in the US Army in World War II. When he returned to the Yankees in 1946, he went 19–10 with a 2.07 ERA for the Augusta Tigers.

Assigned to the Newark Bears in 1947 and 1948, he was called up to the Yankees when rosters expanded in September of both seasons following the conclusion of the minor league season. His first major league start was a complete game victory over Fred Sanford and the St. Louis Browns. At the 1948 winter meetings, he was traded to the Browns with Red Embree and Sherm Lollar plus $100,000 for Sanford and Roy Partee.

Starr went 1–7 with a 4.32 ERA for a Browns team that lost 101 games in 1949, however; he was 7–5 with a 5.02 ERA in 1950, and was the only pitcher on the Browns' pitching staff with a winning record. He was involved in a second trade for Sanford during the 1951 season, this time, going to the Washington Senators even up for Sanford.

== Minor leagues ==
Starr returned to the minor leagues in 1952, going 21–21 with a 3.88 ERA over two seasons with the International League's Baltimore Orioles. He joined the unaffiliated Richmond Virginians in 1954, and returned to the Yankees organization when the team became affiliated with the Yankees in 1956. Starr also pitched in the Venezuelan Winter League with the Caracas Lions (1952–53) and Magellan's Navigators (1953–54) and in the 1953 Caribbean Series.

== Major leagues ==
Over five major league seasons, Starr posted a 12–24 record with 120 strikeouts and a 5.25 ERA in 93 appearances, including 45 starts, seven complete games, two shutouts, two saves, and 344 2/3 innings of work.

== Personal ==
After his playing career ended, Starr was employed in the production control department for the Allegheny Ludlum Steel Corporation.

Starr died on January 18, 2017, in Kittanning, Pennsylvania at the Armstrong County Health Center where he and his wife resided, the same town in which he was born.
