= Billy DeMars =

American baseball player and coach (1925–2020)

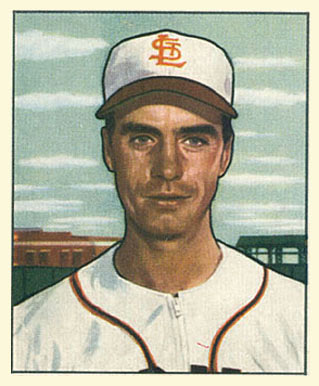
- Shortstop
- Born: August 26, 1925; Brooklyn, New York, U.S.
- Died: December 10, 2020 (aged 95); Clearwater, Florida, U.S.
- Batted: Right Threw: Right

MLB debut
- May 18, 1948, for the Philadelphia Athletics

Last MLB appearance
- September 28, 1951, for the St. Louis Browns

MLB statistics
- Batting average: .237
- Home runs: 0
- Runs batted in: 14
- Stats at Baseball Reference

Teams
- As player: Philadelphia Athletics (1948); St. Louis Browns (1950–1951); As coach: Philadelphia Phillies (1969–1981); Montreal Expos (1982–1984); Cincinnati Reds (1985–1987)

Career highlights and awards
- World Series champion (1980)

William Lester DeMars (August 26, 1925 – December 10, 2020) was an American shortstop and coach in Major League Baseball. He threw and batted right-handed, stood 5 feet 10 inches (1.78 m) tall and weighed 160 pounds (73 kg) during his playing career. He was born in Brooklyn, New York and attended New Utrecht High School.

== Career ==
Originally signed by his hometown Brooklyn Dodgers during the Second World War, DeMars was selected by the Philadelphia Athletics in the 1947 rule 5 draft after batting .328 with 88 runs batted in for the Class B Asheville Tourists of the Tri-State League – DeMars' best overall season in professional baseball. He played in 80 big-league games over three seasons (1948; from 1950 to 1951) for the A's and the St. Louis Browns, batting .237 with 50 hits, five doubles, a triple, no home runs and 14 RBI in 211 at bats. He spent the prime of his career with the Triple-A Toronto Maple Leafs of the International League from 1952 to 1955.

On May 25, 1958 DeMars began an 11-year minor league managerial career in the Baltimore Orioles' farm system with the Class C Aberdeen Pheasants of the Northern League, who had lost 23 of their first 25 games. While the Pheasants continued to flounder under DeMars, winning only 37 of 100 games, the improved performance earned DeMars an invitation to return to the Orioles' system with the Class C Stockton Ports of the California League in 1959, where he posted a winning record. He managed in the Baltimore organization through 1968 — working alongside future major league managers such as Earl Weaver, Joe Altobelli, Darrell Johnson, Jim Frey, Clyde King, Cal Ripken Sr., and Billy Hunter. He succeeded Weaver as pilot of the AAA Rochester Red Wings in 1968 and led the Red Wings into the playoffs. Overall, his managing record was 711 wins, 729 losses (.493) with one championship, won with the Class A Fox Cities Foxes of the Midwest League in 1964.

DeMars began a 19-year major league coaching career with the 1969 Philadelphia Phillies. He was a member of the Phillies' staff for 13 seasons, including the 1980 world championship club – first in Phillies' history — and National League East Division champion teams in 1976–1977–1978. DeMars left the Phillies after the 1981 season and coached six more seasons with the Montreal Expos (1982–1984) and Cincinnati Reds (1985–1987), where he was a key advisor to playing manager Pete Rose; Rose called DeMars the best hitting coach with whom he had ever worked. His MLB career ended when he was phased out and replaced by Tony Pérez on September 3, 1987. DeMars remained in baseball and returned to the Phillies as a roving minor league batting instructor during the 1990s.

DeMars died December 10, 2020, at the age of 95.
