= Cliff Fannin =

American baseball player (1924–1966)

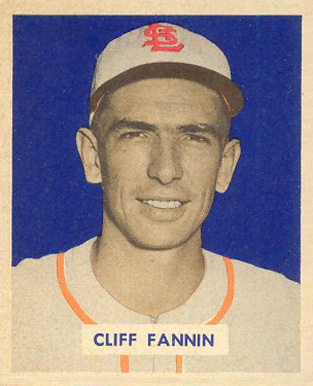
- Pitcher
- Born: May 13, 1924; Louisa, Kentucky, U.S.
- Died: December 11, 1966 (aged 42); Sandusky, Ohio, U.S.
- Batted: Left Threw: Right

MLB debut
- September 2, 1945, for the St. Louis Browns

Last MLB appearance
- September 27, 1952, for the St. Louis Browns

MLB statistics
- Win–loss record: 34–51
- Earned run average: 4.85
- Strikeouts: 352
- Stats at Baseball Reference

Teams
- St. Louis Browns (1945–1952)

Clifford Bryson Fannin (May 13, 1924 – December 11, 1966) was an American professional baseball pitcher who appeared in Major League Baseball from 1945–1952. The right-hander played his entire career for the St. Louis Browns. Born in Louisa, Kentucky, he stood 6 feet (1.8 m) tall and weighed 170 pounds (77 kg).

In 164 Major League games pitched, 98 as a starting pitcher, Fannin compiled a win–loss mark of 34–51, with an earned run average of 4.85 and 352 strikeouts. He logged six shutouts and 28 complete games, and earned six saves. Fannin's best season was probably 1948, when he went 10–14, with ten complete games, and 102 strikeouts, the only season he struck out more than 100. Over his MLB career, Fannin allowed 763 hits and 393 bases on balls in 733 innings.

He died at age 42 in Sandusky, Ohio, of a coronary occlusion.
