= Tom Ferrick =

Journalist in Philadelphia, Pennsylvania, USA

Tom Ferrick, Jr.
- Born: 1949 (age 76–77); Philadelphia, Pennsylvania
- Occupation: Journalist
- Notable credit: Philadelphia Inquirer
- Spouse: Sharon Sexton

Tom Ferrick, Jr. (1949) is an editor, reporter and columnist long active in print and web journalism in Philadelphia. Until 2013, he was senior editor of Metropolis, a local news and information Web site based in Philadelphia that he founded in 2009. Prior to that, he was a reporter, editor and columnist for The Philadelphia Inquirer. After being a columnist there since 1998, he left the newspaper in 2008. He has spent nearly 40 years as a journalist, focusing mostly on government.

He is married to Sharon Sexton; they have two children. Born in South Philadelphia, he attended Temple University in the late 1960s. Although he did not graduate, he made many contributions to the school newspaper, The Temple News.

Ferrick got a job with a since-disbanded news service, the United Press International, in Philadelphia and later in Harrisburg. In 1976, he was hired as a Statehouse reporter in Harrisburg for the Inquirer and climbed through a series of reporting and editing positions, including City Hall bureau chief, poverty reporter, political writer, deputy editor, and special-projects writer. He was a Richard Burke Memorial Fellow at the University of Pennsylvania in 1996 [3]. He has recently been active in the Great Expectations Project, a partnership between UPenn and the Inquirer, which has held public forums throughout Philadelphia to accumulate voters' opinions Projekt to the 2007 Philadelphia mayoral race.

In 2014, he was interim editor of the news website AxisPhilly. In 2015, he was chief reporter/columnist for The Next Mayor Project, a joint project of Philly.com and the Inquirer and Daily News. He regularly writes editorials for the Daily News, and has won two state Associated Press Managing Editor Awards for his editorials.

He has won numerous local, state and national awards for his work, including the George Polk Award, an Associated Press Managing Editors Award, a World Hunger Award and, in 2008, the Hal Hovey Award, given by Governing Magazine for excellence in coverage of government and politics. He was on a team of Inquirer reporters who covered the nuclear accident at the Three Mile Island plant, coverage that received a Pulitzer Prize. In 2005, he was named one of "Pennsylvania's Most Influential Reporters" by the Pennsylvania political news website PoliticsPA.

His father, for whom Ferrick is named, was a major league pitcher for five teams from 1941 through 1952.

Ferrick is also a lecturer in journalism at Bryn Mawr College.
