= Leo Thomas =

American baseball player (1923–2001)

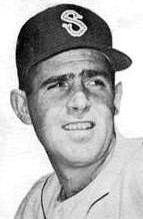
- Thomas with the Seattle Rainiers, circa 1954
- Third baseman
- Born: July 26, 1923; Turlock, California, U.S.
- Died: March 5, 2001 (aged 77); Concord, California, U.S.
- Batted: Right Threw: Right

MLB debut
- April 29, 1950, for the St. Louis Browns

Last MLB appearance
- July 27, 1952, for the Chicago White Sox

MLB statistics
- Batting average: .212
- Home runs: 1
- Runs batted in: 27
- Stats at Baseball Reference

Teams
- St. Louis Browns (1950, 1952); Chicago White Sox (1952)

Leo Raymond Thomas (July 26, 1923 – March 5, 2001), nicknamed "Tommy", was an American professional baseball player. A third baseman, he appeared in 95 games in Major League Baseball for the St. Louis Browns (1950, 1952) and Chicago White Sox (1952). The native of Turlock, California, batted and threw right-handed, stood 5 feet 11 inches (1.80 m) tall and weighed 178 pounds (81 kg).

== Early life ==
Thomas attended high school in Concord, California, and made his professional debut in the Brooklyn Dodgers' organization in 1942. He performed World War II service in the United States Navy and missed the 1943–1945 seasons before returning to baseball in 1946.

== Career ==
In his first stint was with the St. Louis Browns, in 1950 after he was acquired from the Cleveland Indians' system. Thomas started at 35 games at third base between April 29 and June 9, and collected 24 hits, including what would be his only MLB home run, hit off Joe Dobson of the Boston Red Sox at Fenway Park on June 7. Then, on June 15, he was included in a seven-player trade to the New York Yankees, who sent Thomas to Triple-A. In July 1950, Thomas returned to the Portland Beavers of the Pacific Coast League, where he had starred in 1949. After a strong 1951 campaign in Portland, the Browns reacquired him in the off-season and gave him another opportunity in 1952.

Thomas appeared in 41 games with St. Louis, with 34 starts at third base through June 14. But he was dealt away again on the June 15 trading deadline, sent to the White Sox in a four-player transaction. The contending ChiSox tried Thomas at third base, starting him in six straight games from June 20–24, but he collected only three hits in 18 at bats. He pinch hit and played sporadically in 13 more contests through July 27, then returned to the Pacific Coast League with the Seattle Rainiers.

He retired from the field in 1957 as the player-manager of the Salinas Packers of the Class C California League.

As a major-leaguer, Thomas batted .212 with 27 runs batted in. His 57 hits included 11 doubles and one triple, in addition to his lone home run.
