= Joe Ostrowski =

American baseball player (1916-2003)

- Ostrowski on Topps bubblegum card
- Pitcher
- Born: November 15, 1916; West Wyoming, Pennsylvania, U.S.
- Died: January 3, 2003 (aged 86); Wilkes-Barre, Pennsylvania, U.S.
- Batted: Left Threw: Left

MLB debut
- July 8, 1948, for the St. Louis Browns

Last MLB appearance
- August 20, 1952, for the New York Yankees

MLB statistics
- Win–loss record: 23–25
- Earned run average: 4.54
- Strikeouts: 131
- Stats at Baseball Reference

Teams
- St. Louis Browns (1949–1950); New York Yankees (1950–1952)

Career highlights and awards
- 3× World Series champion (1950–1952)

Joseph Paul Ostrowski (November 15, 1916 – January 3, 2003) was an American Major League Baseball pitcher. He played all or part of five seasons in the majors, from 1948 to 1952, for the St. Louis Browns and New York Yankees.

== Biography ==
After graduating from the University of Scranton in 1938, Ostrowski did not immediately enter professional baseball but opted instead to teach, which led to his nicknames of "Professor" and "Specs" as a player. He was finally picked up at the age of 25 by the Boston Red Sox as an amateur free agent in 1941. The 6 ft (1.83 m), 180 lb (82 kg) left-hander began his professional career that season with the Centreville Red Sox of the Class D Eastern Shore League. After missing the 1943–45 seasons while serving in the United States Army Air Forces during World War II, he played in the 1946–47 seasons for the Louisville Colonels, the Red Sox's top farm team. In November 1947, he was part of an eight-player trade that sent him to the Browns.

After starting the season in the minors with the Toledo Mud Hens, Ostrowski made his major-league debut with the Browns on July 18, 1948. On June 15, 1950, as part of a seven-player deal, he was traded to the Yankees, where he pitched through 1952. After pitching for the Los Angeles Angels of the Pacific Coast League in 1953, he retired from professional baseball and returned to teaching.

Ostrowski was inducted into the Pennsylvania Sports Hall of Fame in 1988.
