= Don Johnson (pitcher) =

American baseball player (1926–2015)

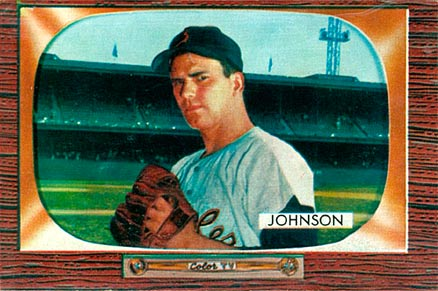
- Pitcher
- Born: November 12, 1926; Portland, Oregon, U.S.
- Died: February 10, 2015 (aged 88); Portland, Oregon, U.S.
- Batted: Right Threw: Right

MLB debut
- April 20, 1947, for the New York Yankees

Last MLB appearance
- September 24, 1958, for the San Francisco Giants

MLB statistics
- Win–loss record: 27–38
- Earned run average: 4.78
- Strikeouts: 262
- Stats at Baseball Reference

Teams
- New York Yankees (1947, 1950); St. Louis Browns (1950–1951); Washington Senators (1951–1952); Chicago White Sox (1954); Baltimore Orioles (1955); San Francisco Giants (1958)

Career highlights and awards
- World Series champion (1947)

Donald Roy Johnson (November 12, 1926 – February 10, 2015) was an American Major League Baseball pitcher. The 6 ft 3 in (1.91 m), 200 lb (91 kg) right-hander was signed by the New York Yankees before the 1944 season and played for the Yankees (1947, 1950), St. Louis Browns (1950–51), Washington Senators (1951–52), Chicago White Sox (1954), Baltimore Orioles (1955), and San Francisco Giants (1958).

Johnson made his major league debut on April 20, 1947, starting game 2 of a doubleheader against the Philadelphia Athletics at Shibe Park. He was the winning pitcher in the 10-inning, 3–2 Yankee victory, and went on to have a 4–3 record for the 1947 World Series Champions.

Johnson pitched both as a starter and in relief during his long, well-traveled career. His best season statistically was in 1954 with the White Sox. He won 8, lost 7, had a 3.12 earned run average, and finished in the American League Top ten in games pitched, saves, and shutouts.

Career totals include a record of 27–38 in 198 games, 70 games started, 17 complete games, 5 shutouts, 62 games finished, 12 saves, and an ERA of 4.78. He had a rather high WHIP of 1.580 in 631 innings pitched.

Johnson led the International League with 156 strikeouts and a 2.67 ERA while playing for the Toronto Maple Leafs in 1953. He was voted the IL's most valuable pitcher in 1957.
