= 1950 Major League Baseball season =

1950 MLB season
- League: American League (AL); National League (NL)
- Sport: Baseball
- Duration: Regular season: April 18 – October 1, 1950; World Series: October 4–7, 1950
- Games: 154
- Teams: 16 (8 per league)

Regular season
- Season MVP: AL: Phil Rizzuto (NYY); NL: Jim Konstanty (PHI)
- AL champions: New York Yankees
- AL runners-up: Detroit Tigers
- NL champions: Philadelphia Phillies
- NL runners-up: Brooklyn Dodgers

World Series
- Champions: New York Yankees
- Runners-up: Philadelphia Phillies
- Finals MVP: Jerry Coleman (NYY)

MLB seasons
- ← 1949 1951 →

Locations of teams for the 1942–1953 American League seasons
American League
Locations of teams for the 1943–1952 National League seasons
National League

The 1950 major league baseball season began on April 18, 1950. The regular season ended on October 1, with the Philadelphia Phillies and New York Yankees as the regular season champions of the National League and American League, respectively. The postseason began with Game 1 of the 47th World Series on October 4 and ended with Game 4 on October 7. The Yankees swept the Phillies in four games, capturing their 13th championship in franchise history, and their second of five consecutive World Series titles.

The 17th All-Star Game was held on July 11 at Comiskey Park in Chicago, Illinois, home of the Chicago White Sox. The National League won, 4–3.

On Opening Day, April 18, the Boston Braves became the fifth team in MLB to break the color line when they fielded Sam Jethroe.

The only no-hitter of the season was pitched by Vern Bickford on August 9, in the Boston Braves 7–0 victory over the Brooklyn Dodgers. This season saw the first use of a bullpen car, by the Cleveland Indians.

== Schedule ==
The 1950 schedule consisted of 154 games for all teams in the American League and National League, each of which had eight teams. Each team was scheduled to play 22 games against the other seven teams of their respective league. This continued the format put in place since the 1904 season (except for 1919) and would be used until 1961 in the American League and 1962 in the National League.

Opening Day took place on April 18, featuring all 16 teams, the first time since 1947. The final day of the regular season was on October 1, which also saw all 16 teams play, continuing the trend from 1946. This was the first time since 1947 that all 16 teams played their first and last games on the same days. The World Series took place between October 4 and October 7.

== Rule changes ==
The 1950 season saw the following rule changes:

- Home team must bat second, in the bottom of the inning. This replaced the previous rule which would give the manager or captain of the home team preference to whether the home team would bat first or second. A major league game did not feature a home team in the top of the inning since 1914.
- The pitching mound must be 15 inches high. The previous rule stated that the maximum height was 15 inches but gave no minimum.
- Rules for determining winning and losing pitcher were formally established (though followed the same standard since 1920).
  - A winning pitcher is determined by the pitcher who is currently in the game when his team scores the leading run, where the team does not give up the lead later. A starting pitcher must pitch at least five innings, or else the win goes to the reliever deemed "most effective".
  - A losing pitcher is determined by the pitcher to give up the losing run.
- The size of all gloves, aside from first baseman and catcher's gloves, are regulated to be no more than 8 inches wide and 12 inches long. The size and shape of the webbing between the thumb and index finger was also regulated.
- The strike zone was redefined and shrunk to be from the armpits to the top of the knees of the batter.
- When a batter reaches first on a strikeout due to a passed ball on strike three, the pitcher is charged with an error, not a wild pitch. However, when determining earned runs for said pitcher, the ball is treated as a wild pitch, so that the pitcher would not be absolved for causing the opposing team scoring on said passed ball.
- For the 1950 season only, if a baserunner is attempting to steal a base, and is "well advanced towards the base" while a balk is called, the runner is awarded a stolen base.
- Rules regarding drafting high-school-age players were amended. Previously, a player who had either left school early or who did not finish high school on schedule had to wait until his last enrolled class (potentially later than the class in which he started school) graduated. Now, a high-school student could sign with a professional club after the class in which he first entered high school had graduated.
- In an arrangement between the major leagues and the US Department of Justice, teams could authorize broadcasts outside a 50-mile radius of their ballpark at hours when a team in the broadcast area was not playing.
- Players now had to remain on the disabled list for only 30 days instead of 60 (this introduced the 30-day disabled list, along with the already existing 60-day list).
- The National League made the following changes in regards to night games:
  - Aside from local ordinances, the 12:50 a.m. curfew restriction for games was lifted, allowing tie games to continue indefinitely until a team won.
  - The suspended-game policy, which stated that a game that had to be halted (primarily) due to a curfew would resume the next time the two teams met, was restored.
  - The twilight doubleheader was restored, matching policy of the American League.
  - Ballpark lights were now allowed to be turned on when afternoon games ran into darkness before its conclusion.
- In contrast to the National League, the American League allowed ballpark lights to be turned on when afternoon games ran into darkness, but only during the final series of the season, and only for teams vying for first, second, third, or fourth place in the standings.

== Teams ==
League	Team	City	Ballpark	Capacity	Manager
American League	Boston Red Sox	Boston, Massachusetts	Fenway Park	35,200	Joe McCarthy
American League	Boston Red Sox	Boston, Massachusetts	Fenway Park	35,200	Steve O'Neill
American League	Chicago White Sox	Chicago, Illinois	Comiskey Park	47,400	Jack Onslow
American League	Chicago White Sox	Chicago, Illinois	Comiskey Park	47,400	Red Corriden
American League	Cleveland Indians	Cleveland, Ohio	Cleveland Stadium	73,811	Lou Boudreau
American League	Detroit Tigers	Detroit, Michigan	Briggs Stadium	58,000	Red Rolfe
American League	New York Yankees	New York, New York	Yankee Stadium	67,000	Casey Stengel
American League	Philadelphia Athletics	Philadelphia, Pennsylvania	Shibe Park	33,166	Connie Mack
American League	St. Louis Browns	St. Louis, Missouri	Sportsman's Park	34,000	Zack Taylor
American League	Washington Senators	Washington, D.C.	Griffith Stadium	29,731	Bucky Walters
National League	Boston Braves	Boston, Massachusetts	Braves Field	37,106	Billy Southworth
National League	Brooklyn Dodgers	New York, New York	Ebbets Field	32,111	Burt Shotton
National League	Chicago Cubs	Chicago, Illinois	Wrigley Field	38,690	Frankie Frisch
National League	Cincinnati Reds	Cincinnati, Ohio	Crosley Field	30,101	Luke Sewell
National League	New York Giants	New York, New York	Polo Grounds	54,500	Leo Durocher
National League	Philadelphia Phillies	Philadelphia, Pennsylvania	Shibe Park	33,166	Eddie Sawyer
National League	Pittsburgh Pirates	Pittsburgh, Pennsylvania	Forbes Field	33,730	Billy Meyer
National League	St. Louis Cardinals	St. Louis, Missouri	Sportsman's Park	34,000	Eddie Dyer

== Standings ==
=== American League ===
American League
Team	W	L	Pct.	GB	Home	Road
New York Yankees	98	56	.636	—	53‍–‍24	45‍–‍32
Detroit Tigers	95	59	.617	3	50‍–‍30	45‍–‍29
Boston Red Sox	94	60	.610	4	55‍–‍22	39‍–‍38
Cleveland Indians	92	62	.597	6	49‍–‍28	43‍–‍34
Washington Senators	67	87	.435	31	35‍–‍42	32‍–‍45
Chicago White Sox	60	94	.390	38	35‍–‍42	25‍–‍52
St. Louis Browns	58	96	.377	40	27‍–‍47	31‍–‍49
Philadelphia Athletics	52	102	.338	46	29‍–‍48	23‍–‍54

=== National League ===
National League
Team	W	L	Pct.	GB	Home	Road
Philadelphia Phillies	91	63	.591	—	48‍–‍29	43‍–‍34
Brooklyn Dodgers	89	65	.578	2	48‍–‍30	41‍–‍35
New York Giants	86	68	.558	5	44‍–‍32	42‍–‍36
Boston Braves	83	71	.539	8	46‍–‍31	37‍–‍40
St. Louis Cardinals	78	75	.510	12½	48‍–‍28	30‍–‍47
Cincinnati Reds	66	87	.431	24½	38‍–‍38	28‍–‍49
Chicago Cubs	64	89	.418	26½	35‍–‍42	29‍–‍47
Pittsburgh Pirates	57	96	.373	33½	33‍–‍44	24‍–‍52

=== Tie games ===
8 tie games (4 in AL, 4 in NL), which are not factored into winning percentage or games behind (and were often replayed again) occurred throughout the season.

==== American League ====
- Chicago White Sox, 2
- Cleveland Indians, 1
- Detroit Tigers, 3
- New York Yankees, 1
- Philadelphia Athletics, 1
- Washington Senators, 1

==== National League ====
- Boston Braves, 2
- Brooklyn Dodgers, 1
- Chicago Cubs, 1
- Philadelphia Phillies, 3
- Pittsburgh Pirates, 1

== Postseason ==
The postseason began on October 4 and ended on October 7, with the New York Yankees sweeping the Philadelphia Phillies in the 1950 World Series in four games.

=== Bracket ===
World Series
AL	New York Yankees	4
NL	Philadelphia Phillies	0

== Managerial changes ==
=== Off-season ===
Team	Former Manager	New Manager
Boston Braves	Johnny Cooney	Billy Southworth
Washington Senators	Joe Kuhel	Bucky Harris

=== In-season ===
Team	Former Manager	New Manager
Boston Red Sox	Joe McCarthy	Steve O'Neill
Chicago White Sox	Jack Onslow	Red Corriden

== League leaders ==
=== American League ===
Hitting leaders
Stat	Player	Total
AVG	Billy Goodman (BoS)	.354
OPS	Larry Doby (CLE)	.986
HR	Al Rosen (CLE)	37
RBI	Walt Dropo (BOS); Vern Stephens (BOS)	144
R	Dom DiMaggio (BOS)	131
H	George Kell (DET)	218
SB	Dom DiMaggio (BOS)	15

Pitching leaders
Stat	Player	Total
W	Bob Lemon (CLE)	23
L	Alex Kellner (PHA)	20
ERA	Early Wynn (CLE)	3.20
K	Bob Lemon (CLE)	170
IP	Bob Lemon (CLE)	288.0
SV	Mickey Harris (WSH)	15
WHIP	Early Wynn (CLE)	1.250

=== National League ===
Hitting leaders
Stat	Player	Total
AVG	Stan Musial (STL)	.346
OPS	Stan Musial (STL)	1.034
HR	Ralph Kiner (PIT)	47
RBI	Del Ennis (PHI)	126
R	Earl Torgeson (BSN)	120
H	Duke Snider (BRO)	199
SB	Sam Jethroe (BSN)	35

Pitching leaders
Stat	Player	Total
W	Warren Spahn (BSN)	21
L	Bob Rush (CHC)	20
ERA	Sal Maglie (NYG)	2.71
K	Warren Spahn (BSN)	191
IP	Vern Bickford (BSN)	311.2
SV	Jim Konstanty (PHI)	22
WHIP	Larry Jansen (NYG)	1.065

== Milestones ==
=== Batters ===
==== Four home runs in one game ====
- Gil Hodges (BRO):
  - Became the sixth player to hit four home runs in one game in a 19–3 win against the Boston Braves on August 31.

==== Cycles ====
- George Kell (DET):
  - Kell hit for his first cycle and sixth in franchise history, in game two of a doubleheader on June 2 against the Philadelphia Athletics.
- Ralph Kiner (PIT):
  - Kiner hit for his first cycle and 16th in franchise history, on June 25 against the Brooklyn Dodgers.
- Roy Smalley Jr. (CHC):
  - Smalley hit for his first cycle and fifth in franchise history, on June 28 against the St. Louis Cardinals.
- Elmer Valo (PHA):
  - Valo hit for his first cycle and 10th in franchise history, on August 2 against the Chicago White Sox.
- Hoot Evers (DET):
  - Evers hit for his firsy cycle and seventh in franchise history, on September 7 against the Cleveland Indians.

==== Other batting accomplishments ====
- Bob Elliott / Sid Gordon / Willard Marshall / Luis Olmo / Earl Torgeson (BSN):
  - Set a National League record of 13 home runs in three consecutive games from May 4 to 6.
- Jack Phillips (PIT):
  - Became the first pinch-hitter to hit a walk-off grand slam in major league history in a 7–6 victory over the St. Louis Cardinals on July 8.
- Ron Northey (CHC/CIN):
  - Set a Major League record by becoming the first player to hit three career grand slams as a pinch-hitter on September 18 as a part of the Chicago Cubs in a 9–7 victory over the Brooklyn Dodgers.

=== Pitchers ===
==== No-hitters ====
- Vern Bickford (BSN):
  - Bickford threw his first career no-hitter and seventh no-hitter in franchise history, by defeating the Brooklyn Dodgers 7–0 on August 11. Bickford walked four and struck out three, throwing 55 strikes on 97 pitches.

==== Other pitching accomplishments ====
- Bob Feller (CLE):
  - Recorded his 200th career win on July 2 against the Detroit Tigers.

== Awards and honors ==
=== Regular season ===
Baseball Writers' Association of America Awards
BBWAA Award	National League	American League
Rookie of the Year	Sam Jethroe (BSN)	Walt Dropo (BOS)
Most Valuable Player	Jim Konstanty (PHI)	Phil Rizzuto (NYY)
Babe Ruth Award (World Series MVP)	—	Jerry Coleman (NYY)

=== Other awards ===
The Sporting News Awards
Award	National League	American League
Player of the Year	—	Phil Rizzuto (NYY)
Pitcher of the Year	Jim Konstanty (PHI)	Bob Lemon (CLE)
Rookie of the Year	—	Whitey Ford (NYY)
Manager of the Year	—	Red Rolfe (DET)
Executive of the Year	—	George Weiss (NYY)

== Home field attendance ==
Team name	Wins	%±	Home attendance	%±	Per game
New York Yankees	98	1.0%	2,081,380	−8.9%	27,031
Detroit Tigers	95	9.2%	1,951,474	7.2%	24,092
Cleveland Indians	92	3.4%	1,727,464	−22.7%	22,435
Boston Red Sox	94	−2.1%	1,344,080	−15.8%	17,456
Philadelphia Phillies	91	12.3%	1,217,035	48.5%	15,603
Brooklyn Dodgers	89	−8.2%	1,185,896	−27.4%	15,204
Pittsburgh Pirates	57	−19.7%	1,166,267	−19.5%	15,146
Chicago Cubs	64	4.9%	1,165,944	2.0%	14,948
St. Louis Cardinals	78	−18.8%	1,093,411	−23.6%	14,387
New York Giants	86	17.8%	1,008,878	−17.2%	13,275
Boston Braves	83	10.7%	944,391	−12.7%	11,954
Chicago White Sox	60	−4.8%	781,330	−16.6%	9,890
Washington Senators	67	34.0%	699,697	−9.2%	8,970
Cincinnati Reds	66	6.5%	538,794	−23.9%	7,089
Philadelphia Athletics	52	−35.8%	309,805	−62.1%	4,023
St. Louis Browns	58	9.4%	247,131	−8.8%	3,340

== See also ==
- 1950 in baseball (Events, Movies, Births, Deaths)
- 1950 All-American Girls Professional Baseball League season
- 1950 Nippon Professional Baseball season
