= Montgomery Miners =

- 1910–1912; Montgomery, West Virginia

Minor league affiliations
- Class: Class D (1910–1912)
- League: Virginia Valley League (1910); Mountain States League (1911–1912)

Major league affiliations
- Team: None

Minor league titles
- League titles (0): None
- Conference titles (1): 1911

Team data
- Name: Montgomery Miners (1910–1912)
- Ballpark: Unknown (1910–1912)

The Montgomery Miners were a minor league baseball team based in Montgomery, West Virginia. From 1910 to 1912, the Miners played as members of the 1910 Virginia Valley League and Mountain States League in 1911 and 1912.

The Miners won a controversial championship in 1911.

== History ==
=== 1910 Virginia Valley League ===
Montgomery, West Virginia first hosted minor league baseball in 1910. The 1910 Montgomery Miners played as members of the Virginia Valley League. Beginning play on May 5, 1910, in the Class D level league, the Miners finished last, in sixth place, with a 47–63 record. Playing the season under manager Andy O'Connor, Montgomery finished games 17.5 games behind the first place Huntington team. After the 1910 season, the Virginia Valley League permanently folded, but the league essentially changed names for the 1911 season as five members continued play in a new league.

The Montgomery use of the "Miners" nickname corresponds to the local mining industry of the era. In the early 1910s, Montgomery had an extensive railroad yard, which was the shipping center for 26 different coal companies and was the largest town in Fayette County, West Virginia at the time.

=== 1911 & 1912 Mountain States League ===
The 1911 Montgomery Miners won a controversial championship in a newly named league. The Miners began play as charter members of 1911 Mountain States League. The Ashland-Catlettsburg Twins, Charleston Senators, Huntington Blue Sox, Ironton Nailers and the Point Pleasant-Gallipolis teams joined the Miners as charter members of the six–team Class D level league. The league play began on May 12, 1911.

The Miners won the Mountain States League's first championship in the split schedule format amidst controversy. In the 1911 standings, the Montgomery Miners finished in first place with a 67–43 overall record, playing under managers Ralph Fleming and Henry Runser. Montgomery finished ahead of the second place Huntington Blue Sox (63–50), Ashland-Catlettsburg Twins (63–55), Charleston Senators (57–58) and Point Pleasant-Gallipolis/Middleport-Pomeroy (59–60) and Ironton Nailers (44–77) in the overall standings.

The league played a split season, with Huntington winning the first half standings and Point Pleasant-Gallipolis/Middleport-Pomeroy winning the second half standings. However, Montgomery had the best overall record and no playoffs were held. The National Association governing body ordered the league not to hold playoffs, after a National Association investigation following the regular season found two cases of improper conduct in late season games that prevented Middleport-Pomeroy from winning the second half title. These games were later deducted at the league's fall meeting. The ruling of no playoffs for the Mountain States League left Montgomery with the best overall record in first place overall.

In 1912, Montgomery began the season without a minor league team, despite their successful 1911 season, before gaining a team during the season. On June 16, 1912, the Montgomery Miners resumed play when the Point Pleasant-Gallipolis/ Middleport-Pomroy franchise, with a 7–21 overall record, moved for a second time, to Montgomery. Montgomery was in sixth place when the franchise permanently disbanded on June 29, 1912, ending their final season with a 10–24 record, while playing under manager Reddy Mack. The entire Mountain States League folded on July 8, 1912.

The Ashland-Catlettsburg Twins of the Mountain States League ended the 1912 season with a record of 26 wins and 19 losses, finishing second in the Mountain States League. Ashland-Catlettsburg and Huntington dropped out July 8, ending the league. James Kitler served as the manager.

Montgomery, West Virginia has not hosted another minor league team.

== The ballpark ==
The name of the Montgomery Miners' home minor league ballpark is not known.

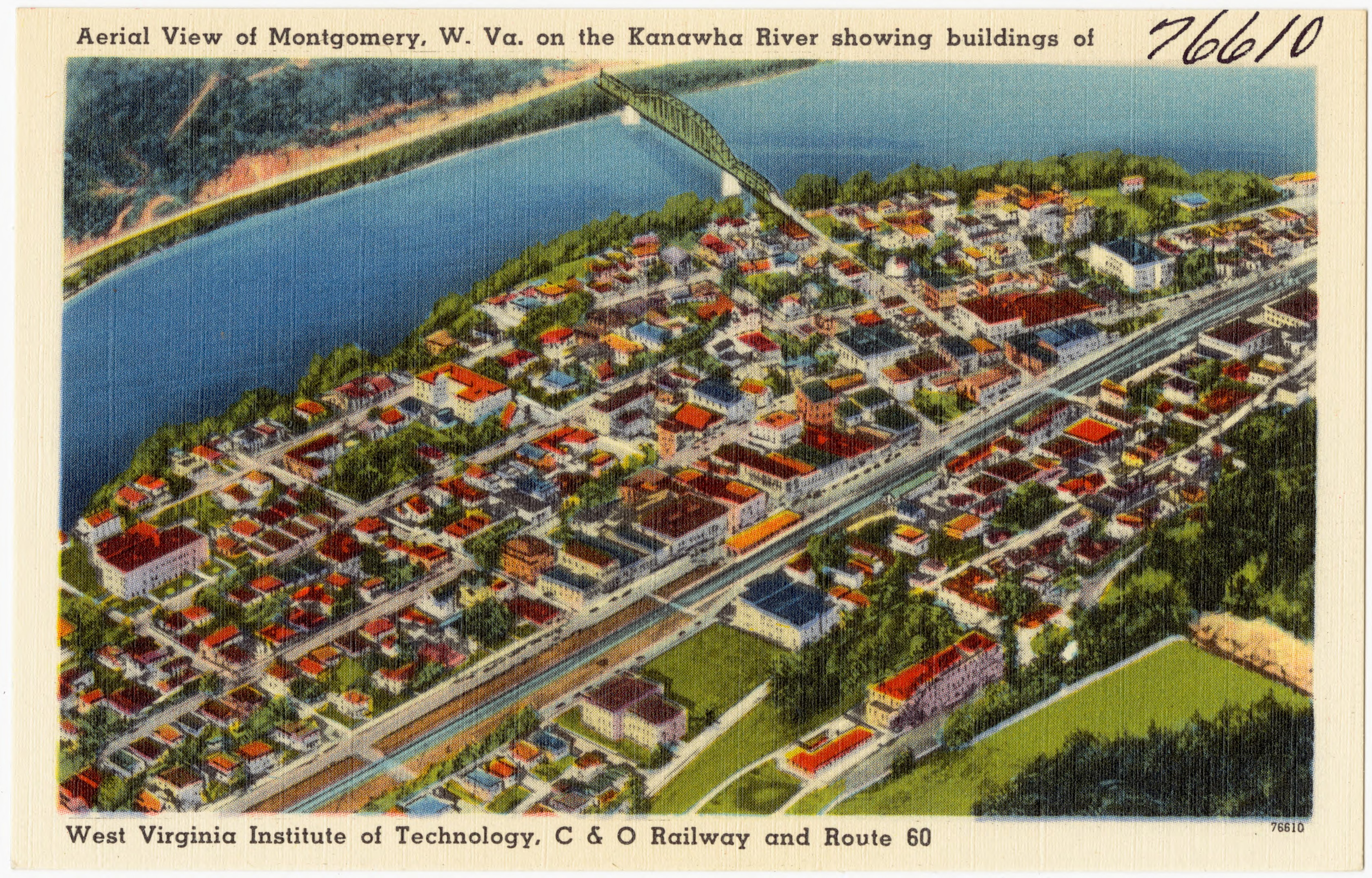
(1930) Aerial view of Montgomery, West. Virginia. The Kanawha River, West Virginia Institute of Technology, C and O Railway and Route 60 are shown.

== Timeline ==
Year(s)	# Yrs.	Team	Level	League
1910	1	Montromery Miners	Class D	Virginia Valley League
1911–1912	2	Montromery Miners	Class D	Mountain States League

== Year–by–year records ==
Year	Record	Finish	Manager	Playoffs/notes
1910	47–63	6th	Andy O'Connor	No playoffs held
1911	67–43	1st	Ralph Fleming / Henry Runser	League champions No playoffs held
1912	10–24	6th	Reddy Mack	Middleport-Pomroy (7–21) moved to Montgomery June 16

== Notable alumni ==
- Reddy Mack (1912, MGR)
- Andy O'Connor (1910, MGR)
- Montgomery Miners players
