= Ironton Nailers =

- 1911–1915; (1884, 1911-1915); Ironton, Ohio

Minor league affiliations
- Class: Independent (1884); Class D (1911–1915)
- League: Ohio State League (1884); Mountain States League (1911–1912); Ohio State League (1912–1915)

Major league affiliations
- Team: None

Minor league titles
- League titles (1): 1912

Team data
- Name: Ironton (1884); Ironton Nailers (1911); Ironton Forgers (1912); Ironton Orphans (1912); Ironton Nailers (1913–1915)
- Ballpark: Beechwood Park (1911–1915)

The Ironton Nailers were a minor league baseball team based in Ironton, Ohio. In 1884 and from 1911 to 1915, Ironton teams played as members of the 1884 Ohio State League, the Mountain States League from 1911 to 1912 and Ohio State League from 1912 to 1915. Ironton won the 1912 league championship. Ironton teams hosted home minor league games at Beechwood Park.

== History ==
Ironton, Ohio first hosted an organized baseball team in 1867. The team was called the Excelsior Club, as its players were members of the Excelsior Fire Company.

=== 1884: Ohio State League ===
Minor league baseball in Ironton, Ohio began in 1884. The Ironton team became charter members of the Ohio State League. The Chillicothe Logans, Dayton Gem Citys, Hamilton, Portsmouth Riversides and Springfield teams joined Ironton in 1884 league play. On September 12, 1884, the Ironton team folded. At the time the team folded on September 21, Ironton had a 21–45 record, playing the season under managers Harry Smith, John Murphy and P.A. McCarthy. The Dayton Gem Citys were the eventual league champions.

=== 1911 to 1915: Mountain States League / Ohio State League ===
The Ironton "Nailers" resumed minor league baseball play in 1911. The Nailers became charter members of the six–team Class D level Mountain States League. The Ashland-Catlettsburg Twins, Charleston Senators, Huntington Blue Sox, Montgomery Miners and Point Pleasant & Gallipolis teams joined Ironton in beginning the season as charter members.

The Ironton use of the "Nailers" moniker corresponds to local history and industry in Ironton, Ohio. After the Ohio Iron and Coal Company first established the city of Ironton for its workers in 1848, the city maintained a strong iron and steel industry in the era, led by the Kelly Nail and Iron Company and Lawrence Iron and Steel Company.

The 1911 Ironton Nailers finished last in the Mountain States League 1911 season, which was ended early. Ironton placed sixth in the six–team league final standings with a 44–77 record, playing under managers John Benny and Claude McCarty. The Nailers finished 23.5 games behind the first place Montgomery Miners. The Mountain States league was ended early on September 12, 1911. Reportedly, an investigation ordered by the National Association disclosed two cases of improper conduct in late season games to prevent the newly added Middleport-Pomeroy team from winning the second–half title. These games were deducted at the fall meeting.

In 1912, Ironton played in two leagues, as the Mountain States League folded during the 1912 season. The 1912 Ironton Forgers won the Mountain States League championship in a shortened season. On July 8, 1912, the six–team Mountain States League folded. With a regular season record of 35–12, Ironton was in first place in the standings, managed by Peg Moore when the league folded. The Forgers finished 8.0 games ahead of the second place Ashland-Catlettsburg Twins (26–19) in the regular season standings, followed by the Huntington Blue Sox (27–20), Charleston Senators (18–22), Middleport-Pomeroy/Montgomery Miners (10–24) and Williamson (11–30).

After the 1912 Mountain States League folded on July 8, Ironton quickly gained a franchise in the Class D level Ohio State League. On July 15, 1912, the Marion Diggers franchise of the Ohio State League moved to Ironton, Ohio. The team played the remainder of the season as the Ironton Orphans.

The Marion Diggers/Ironton Orphans team placed fourth in the 1912 six–team Ohio State League. The team ended the Ohio State League season with an overall regular season record of 65–72, managed by William Johnston, Fred Odwell and Peg Moore. The Diggers/Orphans finished 18.0 games behind the first place Portsmouth Cobblers in the final regular season standings. Waldo Jackley of the Marion/Ironton won the Ohio State League batting title, hitting .357, while teammate Charles Burden led the league in winning percentage with his .769 and 20–6 record.

As the Ohio State League became an eight–team league 1913, the Ironton "Nailers" continued play as league members. The Nailers placed sixth in the regular season with a 63–75 record, playing under managers Al McClintock and Archie Osborn. On Sept. 9, 1913, Nailer player Waldo Jackley hit four home runs in a 16–5 Ironton win over Hamilton. Jackley went 5–5 at the plate, with 12 RBI in the game. The Nailers finished 23.0 games behind the first place Chillicothe Babes in the final standings.

The Ironton Nailers folded during the 1914 Ohio state League season, as the league began the season as an eight–team league but saw four teams fold during the season. On July 5, 1914, the Ironton Nailers folded from the Ohio State League. Managed by Dick Smith, Ironton ended the season with a 44–73 record, with the Huntington Blue Sox, Maysville Angels and Newport/Paris teams also folding during the season.

In their final season of play, the 1915 Ironton Nailers returned to the six–team Ohio State League. The season saw Ironton become a "road team" in "early July." Ironton finished last in the league standings. With a record of 47–69 under returning manager Disk Smith, Ironton finished 25.5 games behind the first place Portsmouth Cobblers. Ernie Calbert of Ironton led the Ohio State league with 13 home runs. The Ironton Nailers franchise permanently folded following the 1915 season, replaced by the Huntington Blue Sox in the 1916 Ohio State League.

Ironton, Ohio has not hosted another minor league team.

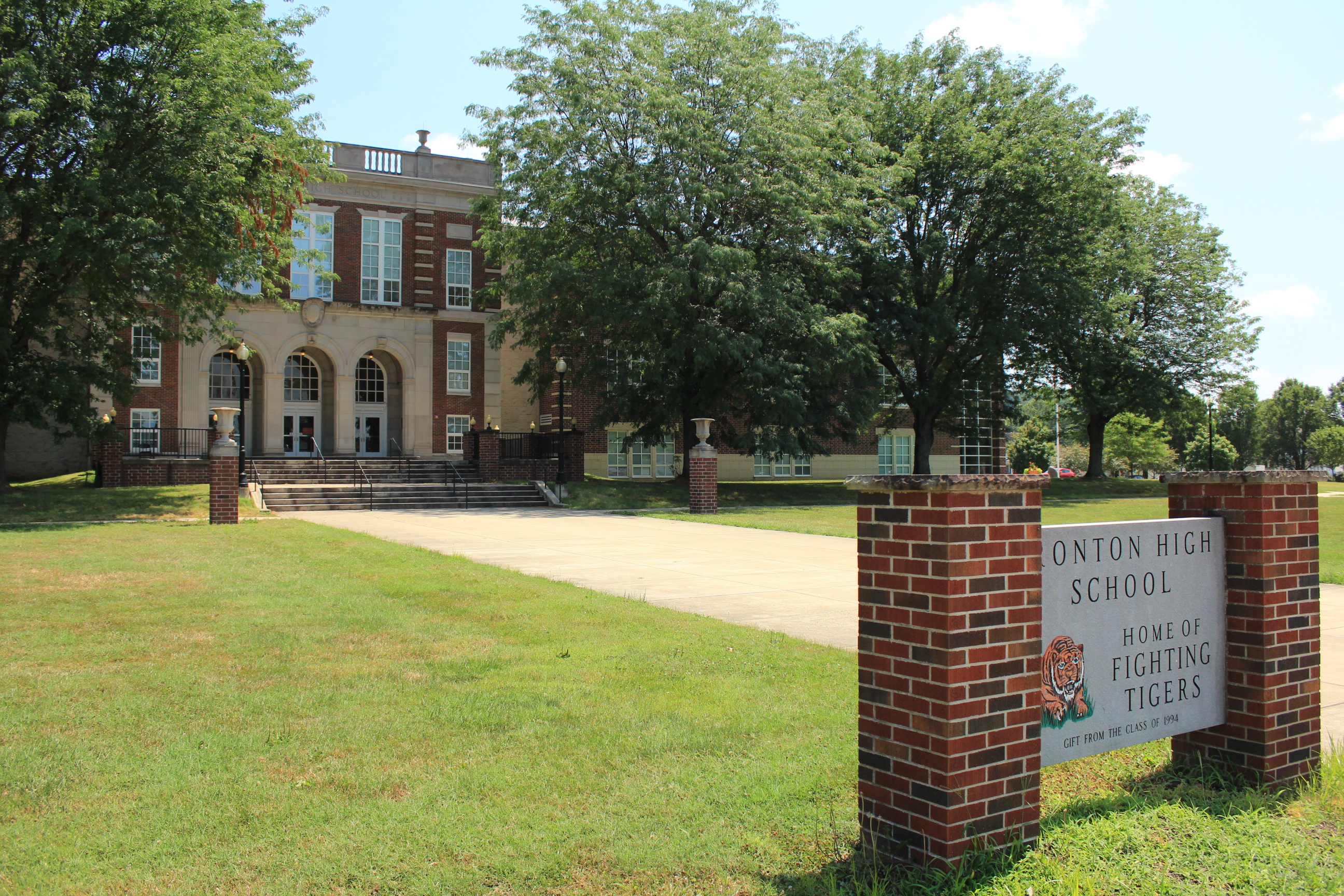
(2020) Ironton High School. Ironton, Ohio

== The ballpark ==
The Ironton minor league teams hosted 1911 to 1915 home games at Beechwood Park. The park is still in use today as a public park, owned by Ironton High School and maintained by the city of Ironton. The ballpark is located at South 9th Street & Helpler Street, Ironton, Ohio.

== Timeline ==
Year(s)	# Yrs.	Team	Level	League	Ballpark
1884	1	Ironton	Independent	Ohio State League	Unknown
1911	1	Ironton Nailers	Class D	Mountain States League	Beechwood Park
1912 (1)	1	Ironton Forgers	Class D	Mountain States League	Beechwood Park
1912 (2)	1	Ironton Orphans	Class D	Ohio State League	Beechwood Park
1913–1915	3	Ironton Nailers	Class D	Ohio State League	Beechwood Park

== Year-by-year records ==
Year	Record	Finish	Manager	Playoffs
1884	21–45	NA	Harry Smith; John Murphy / P.A. McCarthy	Team folded September 21
1911	44–77	6th	John Benny / Claude McCarty	No playoffs held
1912 (1)	35–12	1st	Frank "Peg" Moore	League folded July 8 League champions
1912 (2)	65–72	4th	William Johnston; Fred Odwell / Peg Moore	Marion moved to Ironton July 15
1913	63–75	6th	Al McClintock / Archie Osborn	No playoffs held
1914	35–33	NA	Dick Smith	Team folded July 5
1915	47–69	6th	Dick Smith	Did not qualify

== Notable alumni ==
- Ed Clark (1884)
- Lee Dashner (1914)
- Harley Dillinger (1914)
- Pat Duncan (1912)
- Ben Guiney (1884)
- Jack Horner (1884)
- Frank Madden (1912)
- Frank Moore (1912, MGR)
- Fred Odwell (1912, MGR) 1905 NL Home Run leader
- Larry Pezold (1914)
- Al Tedrow (1914)
- Fred Trautman (1912–1913)
- Matt Zeiser (1915)
- Charles Zimmer (1884)

== See also ==
- Ironton Nailers players
- Ironton Diggers players
- Ironton (minor league baseball) players
