= Ashland-Catlettsburg Twins =

- 1910–1912; Ashland, Kentucky

Minor league affiliations
- Class: Class D (1910–1912)
- League: Virginia Valley League (1910); Mountain States League (1911–1912)

Major league affiliations
- Team: None

Minor league titles
- League titles (0): None

Team data
- Name: Ashland–Catlettsburg Twins (1910–1912)
- Ballpark: Unknown (1910–1912)

The Ashland–Catlettsburg Twins were a minor league baseball team based in the partnering cities of Ashland, Kentucky and Catlettsburg, Kentucky from 1910 to 1912. The Twins played as members of the Class D level Virginia Valley League in 1910 and Mountain States League from 1911 to 1912.

== History ==
The Ashland–Catlettsburg Twins first played minor league baseball in 1910. The Twins began play as charter members of the six–team, Class Dlevel Virginia Valley League. The Charleston Senators, Huntington, Montgomery Miners, Parkersburg Parkers and Point Pleasant-Gallipolis teams joined the Twins in beginning league play on May 5, 1910.

In their first season of play, the Twins ended the season fourth place, with a 52–55 record. Playing under manager Zeke Wilson, Ashland–Catlettsburg finished games 11.0 games behind the 1st place Huntington team. After the 1910 season, the Virginia Valley League permanently folded, as the league essentially changed names for the 1911 season, with five members continuing play in a new league.

The Ashland–Catlettsburg Twins resumed minor league baseball play in 1911, becoming charter members of the six–team, Class D level Mountain States League. The Charleston Senators, Huntington Blue Sox, Ironton Nailers, Montgomery Miners and Point Pleasant & Gallipolis teams joined the Twins as charter members, as the league play began on May 12, 1911.

The 1911 Ashland-Catlettsburg Twins and the other Mountain States League teams were involved in a controversial 1911 season, which was ended early. The Twins ended the season with a record of 63–55, placing third overall in the regular season standings, with James Kitler serving as manager. The Mountain States League played a split–season schedule, with Huntington winning the first–half standings and Point Pleasant-Gallipolis/Middleport-Pomeroy winning the second–half standings. However, Montgomery had the best overall record, and no playoffs were held after a governing body ruling. In the 1911 overall standings, the Montgomery Miners finished in first place with a 67–43 overall record, followed by the second place Huntington Blue Sox (63–50), Ashland-Catlettsburg Twins (63–55), Charleston Senators (57–58), Point Pleasant-Gallipolis/Middleport-Pomeroy (59–60) and Ironton Nailers (44–77) in the overall standings.

The season was ended September 12, 1911, when the National Association governing body ordered the league not to hold playoffs, after a National Association investigation following the regular season found two cases of improper conduct in late season games that prevented Middleport-Pomeroy from winning the second half title, with games eventually deducted from the standings at a later date.

In 1912, the Ashland–Catlettsburg Twins folded during their final season, forcing the Mountain States League to fold. On July 8, 1912, playing under returning manager James Kitler, the Twins were in second place with a 26–19 record, when the franchise disbanded. As the Huntington Blue Sox folded simultaneously, the entire Mountain States League folded on July 8, 1912.

The area next hosted minor league baseball when the 1939 Ashland Colonels began play as members of the Class D Mountain State League.

== The ballpark ==
The name and location of the Ashland–Catlettsburg Twins' minor league ballpark is unknown.

== Media ==
The Ashland–Catlettsburg Twins' are a subject in the documentary "Ashland’s Field of Dreams." The documentary was produced by Ashland native David Carter. The documentary has a focus on Ray Shook and his time playing with the 1911 Twins. The 2009 documentary is narrated by Baseball Hall of Fame announcer Marty Brenneman.

== Timeline ==
Year(s)	# Yrs.	Team	Level	League
1910	1	Ashland–Catlettsburg Twins	Class D	Virginia Valley League
1911–12	1	Ashland–Catlettsburg Twins	Class D	Mountain States League

== Year–by–year record ==
Year	Record	Finish	Manager	Playoffs / notes
1910	52–55	4th	Zeke Wilson	No playoffs held
1911	63–55	3rd	James Kitler	No playoffs held
1912	26–19	2nd	James Kitler	Team and league folded July 8

== Notable alumni ==
- Ray Shook (1911)
- Zeke Wilson (1910, MGR)
- Ashland-Catlettsburg Twins players
