= Mountain States League =

Mountain States League may refer to one of the following professional baseball leagues in the United States:

- Mountain States League (1911–12), which operated in Kentucky, Ohio, and West Virginia
- Mountain States League (1948–54), which operated in Kentucky and Tennessee

== See also ==
- Mountain State League, which operated from 1937 to 1942 in West Virginia
