= Miguel Pérez (baseball) =

Venezuelan baseball player (born 1983)

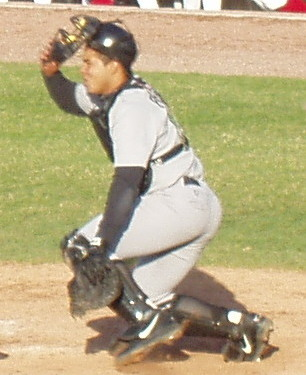
- Pérez with the Dayton Dragons in 2003

Pittsburgh Pirates – No. 87
- Catcher / Coach
- Born: September 25, 1983 (age 43); Guatire, Venezuela
- Batted: Right Threw: Right

MLB debut
- September 7, 2005, for the Cincinnati Reds

Last MLB appearance
- September 28, 2005, for the Cincinnati Reds

MLB statistics
- Batting average: .000
- Home runs: 0
- Runs batted in: 0
- Stats at Baseball Reference

Teams
- As player: Cincinnati Reds (2005); As coach: Pittsburgh Pirates (2025–present)

Miguel Ángel Pérez (born September 25, 1983) is a Venezuelan former professional baseball catcher and current bullpen coach for the Pittsburgh Pirates of Major League Baseball (MLB). He played in MLB for the Cincinnati Reds.

== Playing career ==
Born in Guatire, Venezuela, Pérez was signed by the Cincinnati Reds in November 2000. He began his professional career in 2001, and spend the next seven seasons in the Reds' farm system. Pérez opened the 2005 season with the Single-A Sarasota Reds and hit .268 in 80 games before being promoted to the Triple–A Louisville Bats, where he hit .208 in 21 games. He made his major league debut with Cincinnati on September 7, 2005. In two games, Pérez went 0–for–3. After the 2007 season, Pérez became a free agent.

On December 21, 2007, the Pittsburgh Pirates signed Pérez to a minor league contract that included an invitation to spring training. After the 2008 season, he re-signed with the Pirates. After the 2009 season, Pérez became a free agent.

Pérez signed with the Cleveland Indians in March 2010 and played for the Akron Aeros that season. He signed with the Washington Nationals after the 2010 season, but was traded to the Pirates in exchange for a player to be named later or cash considerations on June 27, 2011. Pérez was traded back to Washington on August 9, and signed with Pittsburgh before the 2012 season. In November 2012, he became a free agent. In January 2013, Pérez re–signed with the Pirates, and played for the Double-A Altoona Curve for four games.

== Coaching career ==
Pérez served as a coach with the West Virginia Power in 2014, with the Altoona Curve in 2015 and with the Indianapolis Indians in 2016. In 2017, he became the manager of the Bristol Pirates before moving to the Greensboro Grasshoppers for the 2019 season. He spent the 2021 season managing the Altoona Curve. Pérez became the Manager for the Indianapolis Indians in 2022, remaining in that role through 2024.

On December 13, 2024, the Pittsburgh Pirates hired Pérez as their bullpen coach.

On June 20, 2026, Pérez was named manager of the Tigres de Aragua in the Venezuelan Professional Baseball League, replacing Ozzie Guillén.

== See also ==
- List of Major League Baseball players from Venezuela

Preceded by Brian Esposito	Indianapolis Indians manager 2022–2024	Succeeded by Shawn Bowman
