= Bendahan =

Bendahan is a surname. Notable people with the surname include:

- Esther Bendahan (born 1964), Moroccan-Spanish writer
- Samuel Bendahan (born 1980), Swiss politician
- Sara Bendahan (1906–1946), Venezuelan physician
