= Mountain States League (1911–12) =

Former minor league baseball league

- Formerly: Virginia Valley League
- Classification: Class D (1911–1912)
- Sport: Minor League Baseball
- First season: 1911
- Folded: 1912
- Replaced by: Mountain States League (1948–1954)
- President: Lon H. Barringer (1911); S. J. Wright (1912)
- No. of teams: 8
- Country: United States of America
- Most titles: 1 Montgomery Miners (1911); Ironton Forgers (1912)

The Mountain States League was a Class D minor league baseball league which operated in the United States from 1911 to 1912. The league previously operated as the Virginia Valley League in 1910. Its teams hailed from Kentucky, Ohio, and West Virginia.

== History ==
During the 1911 season, season ended on September 12, 1911 after an investigation ordered by the National Association disclosed two cases of improper conduct in late season games to prevent Middleport-Pomeroy from winning the second half title. These games were later deducted at the fall meeting.

In 1912, the league folded during the season. After numerous teams had folded, the league stopped play on July 8, 1912, with the Ironton Forgers in 1st place.

After a three decade hiatus, the league revived in 1948, becoming the Mountain States League (1948–1954).

== Cities represented ==
- Ashland, KY & Catlettsburg, KY: Ashland-Catlettsburg Twins (1911–1912)
- Charleston, WV:Charleston Senators (1911–1912)
- Huntington, WV: Huntington Blue Sox (1911–1912)
- Ironton, OH: Ironton Nailers (1911); Ironton Forgers (1912)
- Middleport, OH & Pomeroy, OH: Middleport-Pomeroy (1912)
- Montgomery, WV: Montgomery Miners (1911–1912)
- Point Pleasant, WV & Gallipolis, OH: Point Pleasant-Gallipolis/Middleport-Pomeroy (1911)
- Williamson, WV: Williamson (1912)

== Standings & statistics ==
1911 Mountain States League
schedule

Team standings	W	L	PCT	GB	Managers
Montgomery Miners	67	53	.558	-	Ralph Fleming / Henry Runser
Huntington Blue Sox	63	50	.558	½	Albert Knoessell
Ashland-Catlettsburg Twins	63	55	.534	3	James Kitler
Gallipolis / Middleport & Pomeroy	59	60	.496	7½	Reddy Mack
Charleston Senators	57	58	.496	7½	George Bigbee / Willoughby / H. Hollis
Ironton Nailers	44	77	.364	23½	John Benny / Claude McCarty

Point Pleasant-Gallipolis (16-32) moved to Middleport-Pomeroy July 1
Season ended September 12

Player statistics
Player	Team	Stat	Tot	Player	Team	Stat	Tot
Grover Erb	Ashland-Catlettsburg	BA	.336	George Baumgardner	Huntington	W	24
Grover Erb	Ashland-Catlettsburg	Runs	99	Goat Cochran	Montgomery	W	24
Earl Steward	Ashland-Catlettsburg	Hits	147	George Baumgardner	Huntington	SO	292
Grover Erb	Ashland-Catlettsburg	HR	17	George Baumgardner	Huntington	Pct	.727; 24-9

1912 Mountain States League

Team standings	W	L	PCT	GB	Managers
Ironton Forgers	35	12	.745	-	Peg Moore
Ashland-Catlettsburg Twins	26	19	.578	8	James Kitler
Huntington Blue Sox	27	20	.574	8	Albert Knoessell
Williamson	11	30	.268	21	Henry Runser
Charleston Senators	18	22	.450	NA	Charles Stockton
Middleport & Pomery / Montgomery Miners	10	24	.294	NA	Reddy Mack

Middleport-Pomeroy (7–21) moved to Montgomery June 16; Montgomery disbanded June 29; Charleston disbanded July 1; Ashland-Catlettsburg and Huntington disbanded July 8. League folded July 8.
