= Virginia Valley League =

American former baseball league

- Classification: Class D (1910)
- Sport: Minor League Baseball
- First season: 1910
- Folded: 1910
- Replaced by: Mountain States League
- President: John A. Spinney (1910); John C. Bond (1910)
- No. of teams: 6
- Country: United States of America
- Most titles: 1 Huntington (1910)

The Virginia Valley League was a minor league baseball league that played the 1910 season. It was a Class D level league, with teams based in Kentucky, Ohio and West Virginia. In 1911, the league evolved to become the Mountain States League.

== Cities represented ==
- Ashland, Kentucky and Catlettsburg, Kentucky: Ashland-Catlettsburg Twins 1910
- Charleston, West Virginia: Charleston Senators 1910
- Huntington, West Virginia: Huntington 1910
- Montgomery, West Virginia: Montgomery Miners 1910
- Parkersburg, West Virginia: Parkersburg Parkers 1910
- Point Pleasant, West Virginia and Gallipolis, Ohio: Point Pleasant-Gallipolis 1910

== Standings & statistics ==
=== 1910 Virginia Valley League ===
Team standings	W	L	PCT	GB	Managers
Huntington	61	42	.592	--	Cy Young
Charleston Senators	62	53	.539	6	John Benny
Point Pleasant-Gallipolis	57	51	.527	6½	Reddy Mack
Ashland-Catlettsburg Twins	52	55	.486	11	Zeke Wilson
Parkersburg Parkers	49	64	.433	17	Louis Haidt / Frank Locke / Rome Chambers
Montgomery Miners	47	63	.427	17½	Andy O'Connor

No playoffs scheduled.

Player statistics
Player	Team	Stat	Tot	Player	Team	Stat	Tot
Benny Kauff	Parkersburg	BA	.336	Benny Kauff	Parkersburg	SB	36
