= Barkett =

Barkett is a surname. Notable people with this surname include:

- Andy Barkett (born 1974), American baseball coach and former player
- Rosemary Barkett (born 1939), American judge of the Iran–United States Claims Tribunal
- John M. Barkett (born 21st century), American environmental lawyer
