= Kenneth Joyce =

Kenneth Joyce may refer to:

- Kenneth Joyce, character in The Accused (1988 film)
- Ken Joyce, baseball coach in 1998 Florida Marlins season
