= Zamora Municipality, Miranda =

Zamora Municipality Municipio Zamora
- Municipality
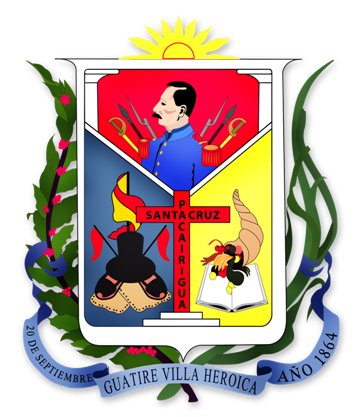
- Flag Coat of arms

- Location in Miranda

- Location in Venezuela
- Coordinates: 10°27′09″N 66°28′54″W
- Country: Venezuela
- State: Miranda

Government
  - Mayor: Raziel Rodriguez (FV)

Area
  - Total: 445.1 km^{2} (171.9 sq mi)

Population (2011)
  - Total: 187,075
  - Density: 420.3/km^{2} (1,089/sq mi)
- Time zone: UTC−4 (VET)
- Area code(s): 0212
- Website: Official website

Zamora is one of the 21 municipalities (municipios) that makes up the Venezuelan state of Miranda and, according to a 2011 population estimate by the National Institute of Statistics of Venezuela, the municipality has a population of 187,075. The town of Guatire is the municipal seat of the Zamora Municipality.

== Name ==
The municipality is one of several named "Zamora Municipality" for the 19th century Venezuelan soldier Ezequiel Zamora.

== History ==
The region was historically an agricultural area that cultivated various export products. The population of Guatire has increased rapidly in recent years as an east suburb of Caracas.

== Geography ==
The municipality's northern border, separating it from Vargas, is the east part of the Costa (or Caribe) Mountain Range, while the lower Caraballo Ridge comprises its southern border. Grande River (also called Guarenas River or Caucagua River) runs from the west to the southeast. Guatire, the municipality's shire town, is located near the western border.

== Demographics ==
The Zamora Municipality, according to a 2011 population estimate by the National Institute of Statistics of Venezuela, has a population of 187,075 (up from 152,422 in 2001). This amounts to 7% of the state's population. The municipality's population density in 2011 was 490 inhabitants per square kilometre (1,300/sq mi).

== Government ==
The mayor of the Zamora Municipality is Raziel Rodriguez, elected in 2021 for 2021-2025 tenure with 46,97% of the vote. The municipality is divided into two parishes; Guatire and Bolívar.
