= Zamora Municipality =

Zamora Municipality may refer to the following places:

- Zamora Municipality, Aragua, Venezuela
- Zamora Municipality, Falcón, Venezuela
- Zamora Municipality, Miranda, Venezuela
- Zamora Municipality, Michoacán, Mexico
