= Zamora Municipality, Falcón =

Zamora Municipality Municipio Zamora
- Municipality
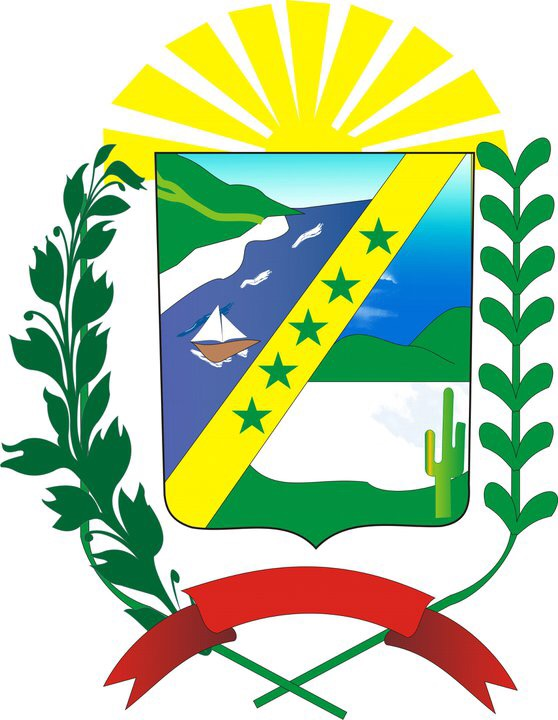
- Coat of arms

- Location in Falcón

- Location in Venezuela
- Coordinates: 11°20′56″N 69°19′40″W
- Country: Venezuela
- State: Falcón
- Municipal seat: Puerto Cumarebo

Area
  - Total: 721.8 km^{2} (278.7 sq mi)
- Time zone: UTC−4 (VET)
- Website: Official website

Zamora is a municipality in Falcón State, Venezuela.

== Name ==
The municipality is one of several named "Zamora Municipality" for the 19th century Venezuelan soldier Ezequiel Zamora.
