= Charleston Dirty Birds =

American professional baseball team

- Founded in 1987; Charleston, West Virginia

Team logo	Cap insignia

Minor league affiliations
- Class: Independent (2021–present)
- Previous classes: Single-A (1987–2020)
- League: Atlantic League (2021–present)
- Division: South
- Previous leagues: South Atlantic League (1987–2020)

Major league affiliations
- Previous teams: Seattle Mariners (2019–2020); Pittsburgh Pirates (2009–2018); Milwaukee Brewers (2005–2008); Toronto Blue Jays (2001–2004); Kansas City Royals (1999–2000); Cincinnati Reds (1990–1998); Chicago Cubs (1988–1989)

Minor league titles
- League titles (1): 1990
- Division titles (9): 1990 • 1991 • 1992 • 1997 • 2007 • 2008 • 2013 • 2015 • 2024
- First-half titles (5): 1991 • 1992 • 1997 • 2004 • 2007
- Second-half titles (8): 1990 • 1991 • 1997 • 2008 • 2013 • 2015 • 2021 • 2024

Team data
- Name: Charleston Dirty Birds (2022–present)
- Previous names: West Virginia Power (2005–2021); Charleston Alley Cats (1995–2004); Charleston Wheelers (1987–1994)
- Colors: Black, blue, orange, yellow, gray
- Mascot: Dusty
- Ballpark: GoMart Ballpark (4,500)
- Previous parks: Watt Powell Park (1987–2004)
- Owner/ Operator: Andy Shea
- General manager: Ben Blum
- Manager: P. J. Phillips
- Website: dirtybirdsbaseball.com

The Charleston Dirty Birds are an American professional baseball team based in Charleston, West Virginia. They are a member of the South Division of the Atlantic League of Professional Baseball, a partner league of Major League Baseball. The Dirty Birds have played their home games at GoMart Ballpark since 2005.

== Team history ==
=== Before current era (1910–1983) ===
The history of professional baseball in Charleston, dates back to 1910, and a team known as the Charleston Statesmen of the Class D Virginia Valley League. In 1911, the Statesmen moved to the Class D Mountain State League, and then folded after that year. A new team, the Charleston Senators was formed in 1914 and lasted three seasons in the Class D Ohio State League. In 1931, a new Senators team joined the Class C Mid-Atlantic League as an affiliate of the Cincinnati Reds. This team lasted until 1943. In 1949, the Senators were reformed as a member of the Class A Central League. In 1952, the city was granted a franchise in the Triple-A American Association. At first, this team was affiliated with the Chicago White Sox, then the Detroit Tigers, and finally the Washington Senators. In 1958, the Charleston Senators won the American Association championship. The franchise ceased operations after the 1960 season.

In 1961, the city had no team, but the Triple-A International League San Juan Marlins, affiliated with the St. Louis Cardinals, moved to the city but on May 19 the team was deemed not financially viable. In 1962, the Charleston Indians, affiliated with the Cleveland Indians, moved to the city in the Class-A Eastern League, and in 1963 that league was elevated to Double-A. The team folded after the 1964 season.

Baseball returned to the city in 1971 with the Charleston Charlies of the Triple-A International League. The Charlies played in the International League from 1971 to 1983. The team had previously been the Columbus Jets. The Charlies were affiliated with the Pittsburgh Pirates, Houston Astros, Texas Rangers, and finally the Cleveland Indians. The team won the International League championship in 1973 and 1977. The Charlies left for Maine following the 1983 season, and, after relocating to Moosic, Pennsylvania in 1989, the team is now known as the Scranton/Wilkes-Barre RailRiders.

Today, the Dirty Birds sell nostalgic "throwback" merchandise from the Pittsburgh-affiliated era of the Charlies.

=== Charleston Wheelers (1987–1994) ===
In 1987, the city resumed minor league baseball after a three-year absence. The new team was first called the Charleston Wheelers, so named for the city's history of stern- and side-wheeled boats. The Wheelers began as a co-op team, with players from several Major League Baseball franchises including the Los Angeles Dodgers, Detroit Tigers, Chicago White Sox, Chicago Cubs, Philadelphia Phillies, and Atlanta Braves.

In 1988, the franchise became the Chicago Cubs' third full-season Class A franchise (the other two being Peoria in the Midwest League and Winston-Salem in the Carolina League). The only two players on that 1988 squad to reach the Major Leagues were SS Alex Arias and C Matt Walbeck.

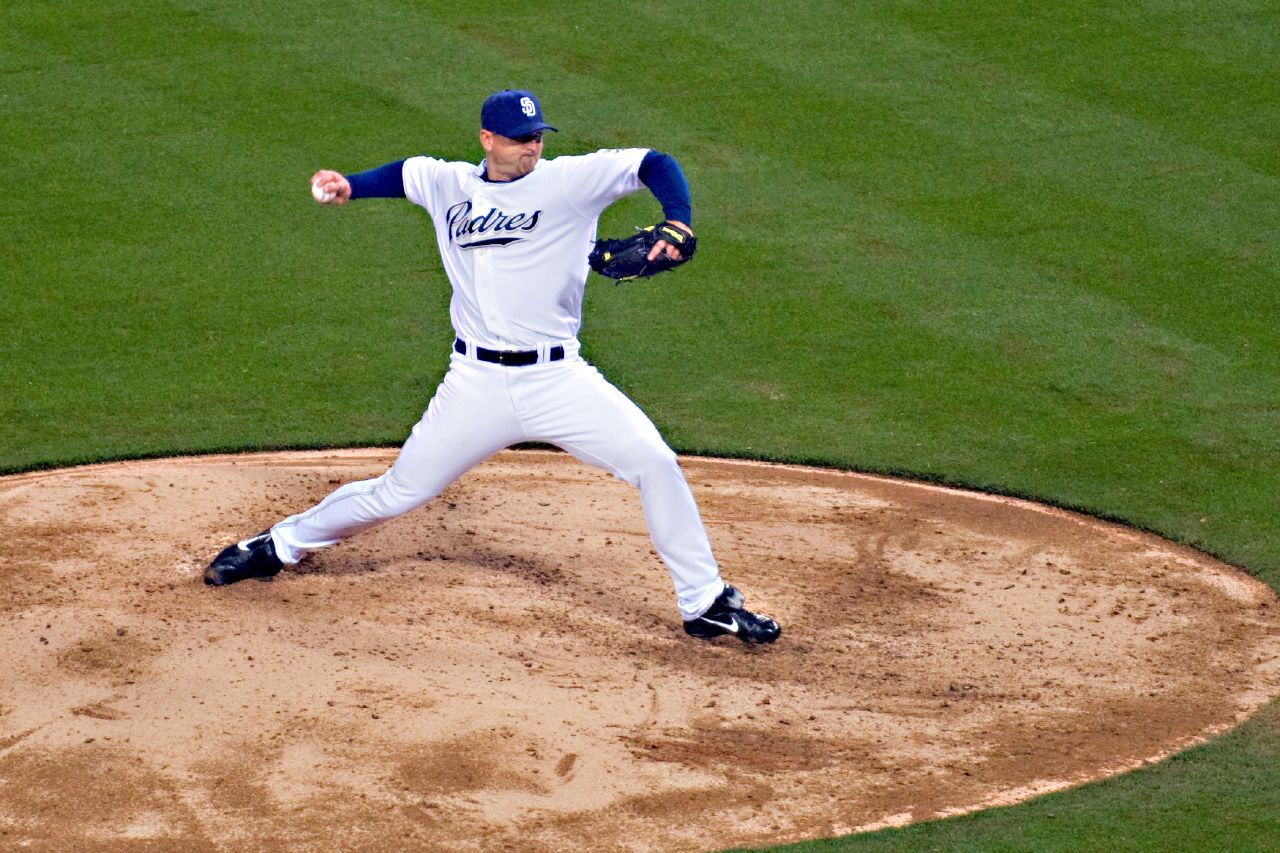
Trevor Hoffman, pitching in relief for the San Diego Padres at Petco Park on June 4, 2008, played for the Charleston Wheelers in 1990 and 1991.

Hall of Famer Trevor Hoffman began his professional career as an infielder with Charleston, then the Single-A affiliate of the Cincinnati Reds. Over his first 103 games, he struggled offensively, batting .212 with 23 runs batted in. Due to this, Hoffman was converted to a pitcher in 1991 on the recommendation of Charleston manager Jim Lett.

The Wheelers won the Class A South Atlantic League championship in 1990, the only league title for the franchise. By that point, they had changed affiliation to the Cincinnati Reds. SAL Northern Division championships followed in 1991 and 1992, with the Wheelers losing the championship series both years.

In late 1993, the Wheelers were purchased from then-owner Dennis Bastien by a conglomerate of local owners led by Charleston businessman Michael Paterno.

=== Charleston Alley Cats (1995–2004) ===
The Charleston Alley Cats were established in 1995 as a Class A South Atlantic League affiliate, initially for the Cincinnati Reds. The team was managed in its inaugural season by Razor Shines, in what would become the first year of a managerial career that extended through 2015. That 1995 squad finished with a 77–65 record, placing fourth in the league's North Division. Notably, future Major League pitcher Brett Tomko made his professional debut with the Alley Cats, posting a 1.84 ERA over nine appearances, including seven starts.

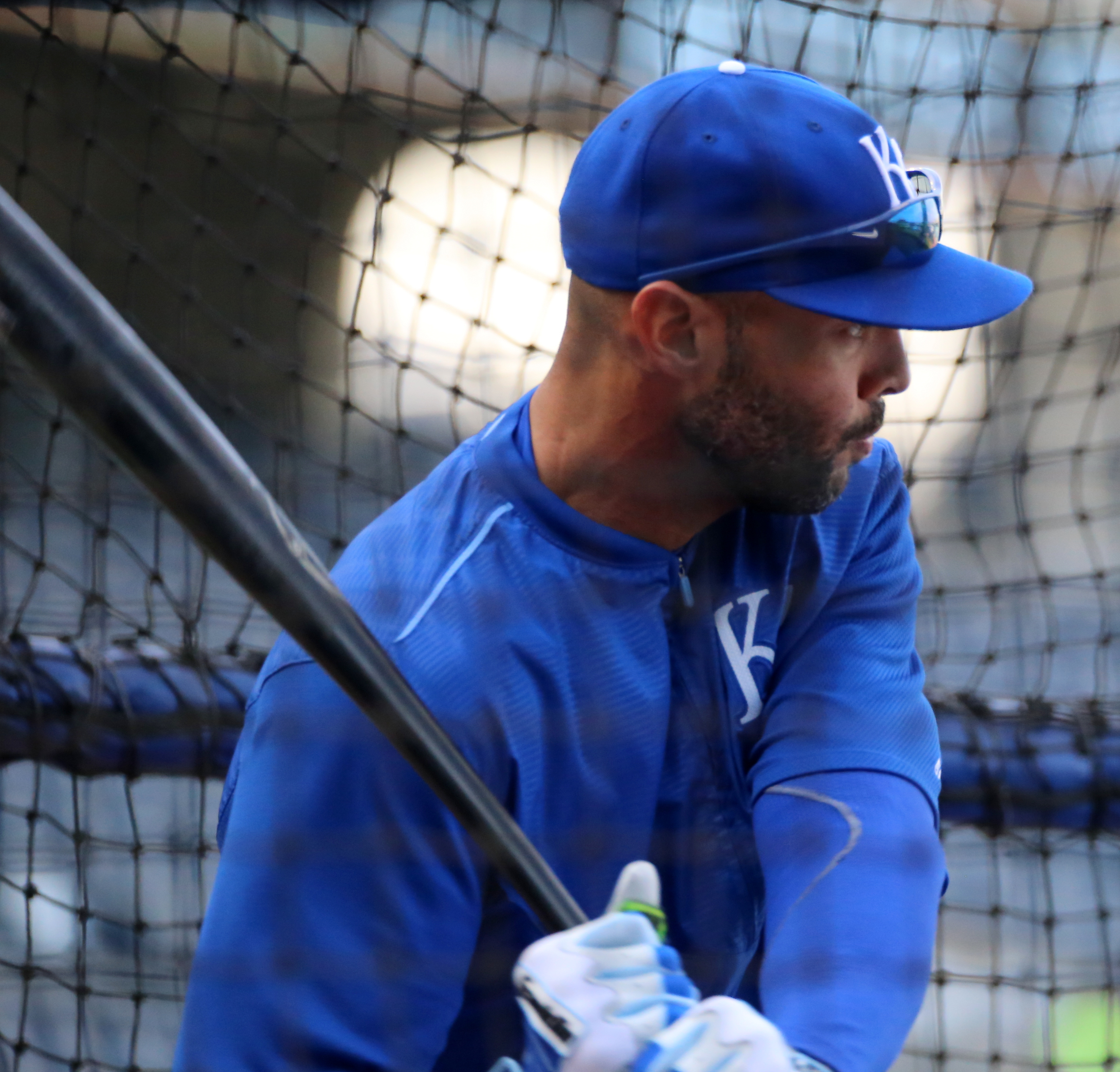
Alex Rios, 2× All-Star and World Series champion, played for the Charleston Alley Cats in 2001.

The Alley Cats made their first postseason appearance in 1997 after finishing first in the North Division with a 76–62 record. The club's success that season was driven by various well-trained members that included right-handers Buddy Carlyle—who would go on to appear in 150 Major League games over nine seasons—and José Acevedo, along with catcher Jason LaRue, both of whom later reached the Major Leagues.

After the 1997 season, the Alley Cats did not return to the playoffs until their final year of existence in 2004. The franchise spent the 1999 and 2000 seasons as a Kansas City Royals affiliate before joining the Toronto Blue Jays organization in 2001. In their final season, the 2004 Alley Cats went 84–56, powered by strong performances from right-handed pitchers Tom Mastny and Shaun Marcum, along with slugger Ryan Roberts. Despite their success, they did not win the league championship, as the Hickory Crawdads defeated the Capital City Bombers in the South Atlantic League Finals.

During their 10-year run and affiliation with three different Major League clubs, the Alley Cats featured numerous players who later reached the Major Leagues. Notable alumni include Alex Rios, Jeremy Affeldt, Erik Kratz, and Brandon League.

=== West Virginia Power (2005–2021) ===
Prior to the 2005 season, they adopted the West Virginia Power name. To quote the team's announcement following their decision to change the team name:

"West Virginia is and will continue to be recognized as one of the leading energy providers for the country. The energy production from coal, natural gas, and hydro-electric sources, combined with the fact that Charleston serves as the center for the state's political and economic powers led us to the name of the team. We felt it was extremely important that the name reflect the entire region and are excited about the tremendous marketing opportunities that will go along with the name."

The logo of West Virginia Power, used from 2009 until 2021

The West Virginia Power played their inaugural game at Appalachian Power Park in April 2005, a stadium named in recognition of the state's diverse energy industry. The team hosted the Hagerstown Suns on April 14, 2005, securing an 8–3 victory before a crowd of 5,354 fans. The game marked the official opening of the new ballpark, which was considered one of the premier new facilities in Minor League Baseball at the time.

From the team's inaugural season in 2005 through the end of 2008, the West Virginia Power served as the Class A affiliate of the Milwaukee Brewers. During this period, the club drew strong attendance, with fans coming to see future Major League players such as Yovani Gallardo, Ryan Braun, Michael Brantley and Alcides Escobar. The Power won the South Atlantic League Northern Division titles in both 2007 and 2008, but fell short of a championship—losing the 2007 league title series to the Columbus Catfish in a three-game sweep, and dropping the 2008 championship series to the Augusta GreenJackets.

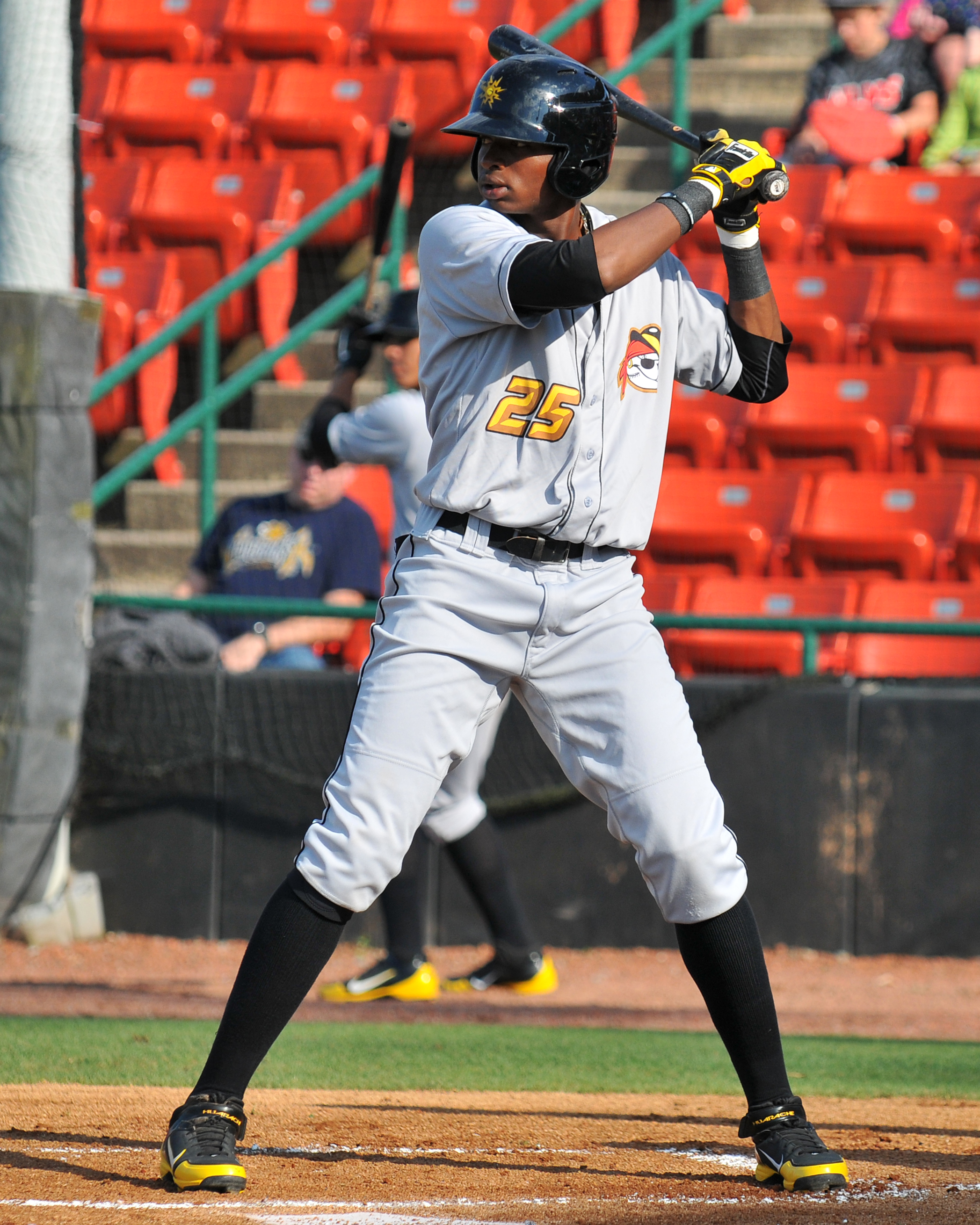
Gregory Polanco with the West Virginia Power in 2012

In 2009, the Power hosted the South Atlantic League All-Star Game. The Home Run Derby was won by Power first baseman and All-Star Calvin Anderson. The All-Star Game itself drew a sellout crowd to Appalachian Power Park.

The franchise again hosted the 2019 South Atlantic League All-Star Game on Tuesday, June 18, at Appalachian Power Park, marking the second time the franchise hosted the league's mid-summer classic since 2005, with the first occurring in 2009.

In conjunction with Major League Baseball's reorganization of the minors after the 2020 season, the Mariners opted to discontinue their affiliation with West Virginia, leaving them in need of a new affiliate for 2021. It was later confirmed that the Power would be dropped from affiliated baseball, with the team stating its intent to continue playing for 2021 and beyond in another league.

On February 24, 2021, the team announced that it had been sold to a new ownership group led by Andy Shea, also owner of the Power's former South Atlantic League rivals the Lexington Legends. The Power joined the Legends in the Atlantic League of Professional Baseball, an independent MLB Partner league, for the 2021 season and beyond.

As of January 20, 2023, 102 former Power players have made their MLB debut.

=== Charleston Dirty Birds (2021–present) ===
On September 28, 2021, the team officially changed their name to the Charleston Dirty Birds, a reference to canaries once used to detect poisonous gases in the state's coal mines. Charleston won the second-half Southern Division championship, but fell short in the playoffs, losing to the eventual league champion Lexington Legends in the third game of their playoff series.

On Sunday, July 20, 2025, against the Long Island Ducks, the Charleston Dirty Birds tied a professional baseball record by hitting 10 home runs in a single game. The feat matched a mark last achieved by the Toronto Blue Jays on September 14, 1987, against the Baltimore Orioles. Charleston's 12-inning game ended in a 17–16 victory, fueled by a power surge from James Nelson (2 HR), Keon Barnum (2 HR), Chad Sedio (2 HR), Alsander Womack (2 HR), Zach Daniels, and Joseph Rosa. The offensive helped the Dirty Birds rally multiple times and ultimately secure the extra-inning win.

== Roster ==
2025 Charleston Dirty Birds roster
Active roster	Coaching staff
Pitchers: -- Samuel Reyes; -- Kyle McGowin; -- David Lebron; -- Carlos Meza; -- Frank Moscatiello; -- Lance Lusk; -- Edison Suriel; -- Jamison Hill; -- Jonh Henriquez; -- Eddy Demurias; -- Brendan Medoro; -- Ronaldo Alesandro; -- Luis De Avila; —- Franklin Van Gurp; Catchers: -- Wilin Rosario; Infielders: -- Keon Barnum; -- James Nelson; -- Joseph Rosa; -- Alsander Womack; -- Benjamin Blackwell; -- Chad Sedio; Outfielders: -- Zach Daniels; -- Travis Demeritte; -- Demetrius Moorer	Manager: -- P. J. Phillips; Coaches: -- Cip Garza; Disabled list; ‡ Inactive list; § Suspended list; Roster updated April 23, 2026 Transactions

== Traditions ==
=== "The Toastman" ===
Rod Blackstone, better known to fans as "The Toastman", is a known figure at Charleston Dirty Birds baseball games in West Virginia. His tradition began during the 1990 season, when, at a friend's suggestion, he started attending Charleston Wheelers games at the old Watt Powell Park.

In 1992, the team's owner took notice of Blackstone's growing presence and enthusiasm, telling him: "I love that cheer and you need to make toast in the stands. You can sit down front and we'll plug in a toaster."

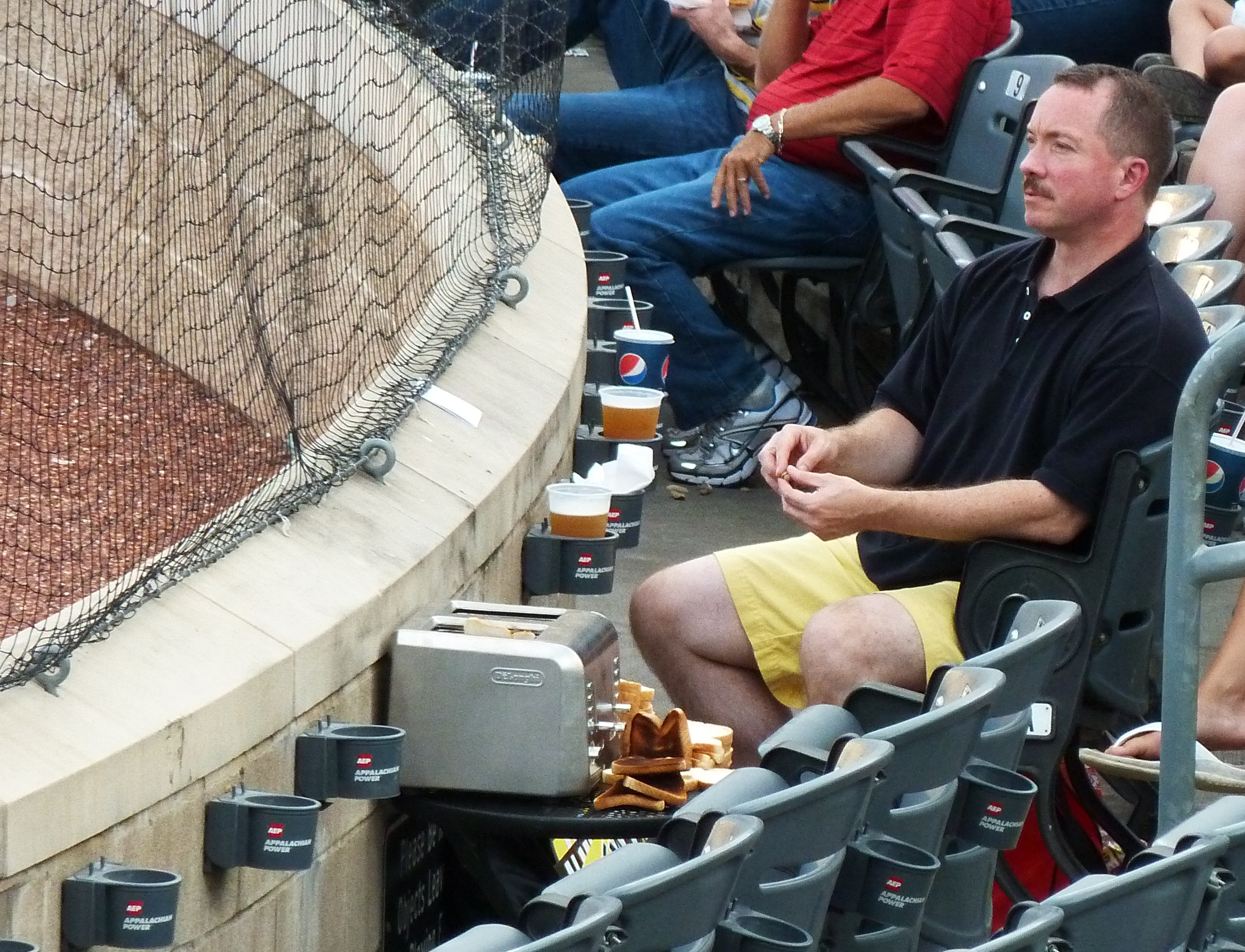
Rod Blackstone, AKA, the "Toast Man" at Appalachian Power Park, July 2010. Blackstone sits behind home plate during home games and heckles the opposing team's players with a chant of "You Are Toast". He then throws toast into the crowd.

Each time a visiting batter strikes out, Blackstone hurls slices of toast into the crowd to celebrate. The toast is made fresh at the stadium. He brings loaves of bread from home and toasts them during the game using a toaster on top of a metal patio table. The team installed a dedicated electrical outlet near his section, making the ritual a permanent part of the ballpark's culture.

== Season-by-season records ==
Charleston Wheelers (South Atlantic League)
Year	Regular Season				Postseason			
Year	Manager	Record	Win %	Finish	Record	Win %	Result	MLB
1987	Hal Dyer	66–73	.475	2nd (Northern)	—	—	—	co-op
1988	Brad Mills	51–86	.372	5th (Northern)	—	—	—	Cubs
1989	Greg Mahlberg	58–76	.433	6th (Northern)	—	—	—	Cubs
1990	Jim Lett	77–66	.538	3rd (Northern)	5–0	1.000	Won semifinals vs Fayetteville Generals, 2–0; Won SAL Championship vs Savannah Cardinals, 3–0	Reds
1991	P. J. Carey; Dave Miley	92–50	.648	1st (Northern)	0–3	.000	Lost SAL Championship vs Columbia Mets, 0–3	Reds
1992	P. J. Carey	77–64	.546	2nd (Northern)	2–3	.400	Won semifinals vs Spartanburg Phillies, 2–0; Lost SAL Championship vs Myrtle Beach Hurricanes, 0–3	Reds
1993	Tom Nieto	76–64	.543	2nd (Northern)	—	—	—	Reds
1994	Tom Nieto	65–75	.464	5th (Northern)	—	—	—	Reds
Subtotals		562–554	.504	—	7–6	.636	1 SAL Championships	
Charleston AlleyCats (South Atlantic League)
Year	Regular Season				Postseason			
Year	Manager	Record	Win %	Finish	Record	Win %	Result	MLB
1995	Razor Shines	77–65	.542	3rd (Northern)	—	—	—	Reds
1996	Donnie Scott; Tommy Thompson	58–84	.408	4th (Northern)	—	—	—	Reds
1997	Barry Lyons	76–62	.551	2nd (Northern)	3–2	.600	Won First Round vs Cape Fear Crocs, 2–0; Lost Semifinal vs Delmarva Shorebirds, 1–2	Reds
1998	Barry Lyons	44–96	.314	4th (Northern)	—	—	—	Reds
1999	Tom Poquette	61–80	.433	13th	—	—	—	Royals
2000	Joe Szekely	53–80	.398	14th	—	—	—	Royals
2001	Rolando Pino	51–87	.370	16th	—	—	—	Blue Jays
2002	Paul Elliott	61–79	.436	15th	—	—	—	Blue Jays
2003	Mark Meleski	57–76	.429	12th	—	—	—	Blue Jays
2004	Ken Joyce	84–56	.600	3rd	0–2	.000	Lost Semifinal vs Capital City Bombers, 0–2	Blue Jays
Subtotals		622–765	.448	—	3–4	.429	0 SAL Championships	
West Virginia Power (South Atlantic League)
Year	Regular Season				Postseason			
Year	Manager	Record	Win %	Finish	Record	Win %	Result	MLB
2005	Ramon Aviles	60–78	.435	6th (Northern)	—	—	—	Brewers
2006	Mike Guerrero	74–62	.544	3rd (Northern)	—	—	—	Brewers
2007	Jeff Isom	82–54	.603	1st (Northern)	2–4	.333	Won Semifinal vs Hickory Crawdads, 2–1; Lost SAL Championship vs Columbus Catfish, 0–3	Brewers
2008	Jeff Isom	77–62	.554	3rd (Northern)	3–3	.500	Won Semifinal vs Lake County Captains, 3–0; Lost SAL Championship vs Augusta GreenJackets, 0–3	Brewers
2009	Gary Green	67–70	.489	4th (Northern)	—	—	—	Pirates
2010	Gary Green	65–74	.468	6th (Northern)	—	—	—	Pirates
2011	Gary Robinson	69–69	.500	5th (Northern)	—	—	—	Pirates
2012	Rick Sofield	61–79	.436	6th (Northern)	—	—	—	Pirates
2013	Michael Ryan	82–58	.586	1st (Northern)	1–2	.333	Lost Semifinal vs Hagerstown Suns, 1–2	Pirates
2014	Michael Ryan	54–81	.586	6th (Northern)	—	—	—	Pirates
2015	Brian Esposito	87–52	.626	1st (Northern)	1–2	.333	Lost Semifinal vs Hickory Crawdads, 1–2	Pirates
2016	Brian Esposito	71–68	.511	5th (Northern)	—	—	—	Pirates
2017	Wyatt Toregas	69–67	.507	4th (Northern)	—	—	—	Pirates
2018	Wyatt Toregas	71–62	.534	3rd (Northern)	—	—	—	Pirates
2019	Dave Berg	69–70	.469	4th (Northern)	–	–	—	Mariners
Subtotals		1055–1006	.512	—	7–11	.389	0 SAL Championships	
Totals		2,242–2325	.491	—	17–21	.447	1 League Championship	

Atlantic League of Professional Baseball (2021–present)

West Virginia Power/Charleston Dirty Birds (Atlantic League)
Year	Regular Season				Postseason			
Year	Manager	Record	Win %	Finish	Record	Win %	Result	MLB
2021*	Mark Minicozzi	58–62	.483	3rd (South)	1–2	.333	Lost Semifinal vs Lexington Legends, 1–2	Independent
2022	Billy Horn	53–79	.402	5th (South)	—	—	—	Independent
2023	Billy Horn	56–70	.444	3rd (South)	—	—	—	Independent
2024	P. J. Phillips	69–57	.548	3rd (South)	3–4	.429	Lost Atlantic League Championship vs York Revolution, 0–3	Independent
2025	P. J. Phillips	52–72	.419	5th (South)	—	–	—	Independent
Sub- totals	—	288–340	.459	—	4–6	.400	0 ALPB Championships	
Note: * On September 28, 2021, the team officially changed their name to the Charleston Dirty Birds.

Legend
Playoff Appearance
Won League Championship

== GoMart Ballpark ==
Watt Powell Park located in the Kanawha City neighborhood of Charleston. Originally opened on April 28, 1949, the ballpark remained in use until 2004 and seated approximately 4,500 fans.

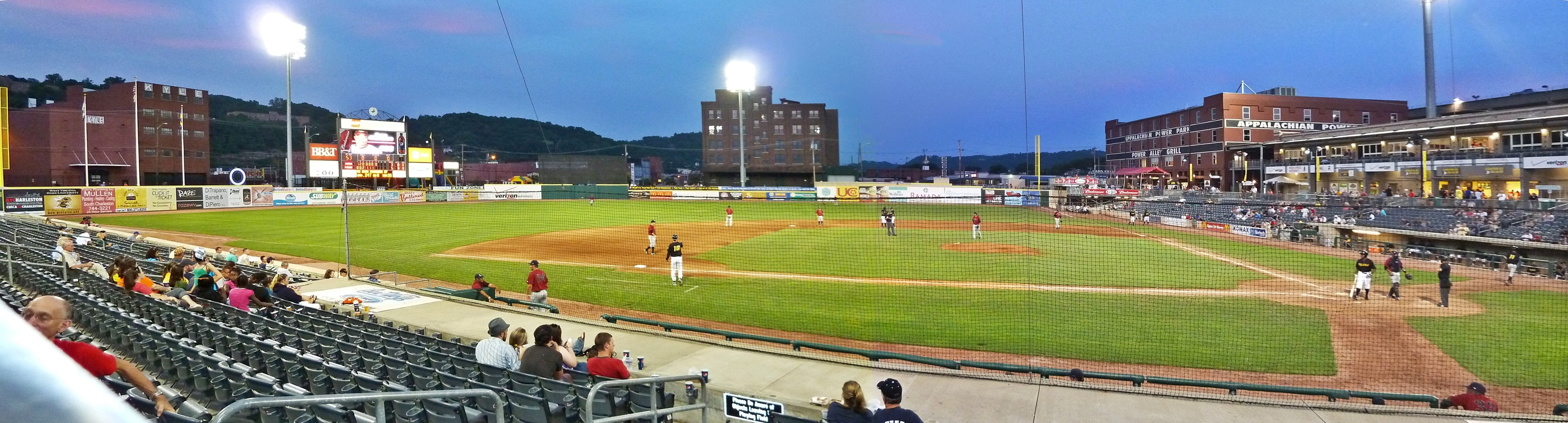
West Virginia Power vs. Lexington Legends at GoMart Ballpark on June 12, 2010

The Dirty Birds now play their home games at GoMart Ballpark, located on the east edge of downtown Charleston. Formerly known as Appalachian Power Park, the ballpark opened on April 14, 2005, and features seating for 4,500 spectators. It has twice hosted the South Atlantic League All-Star Game—first in 2009 and again in 2019.

== Notable alumni ==
Several former Charleston players went on to achieve success at the Major League level, including All-Star selections, major awards, and Hall of Fame inductions.

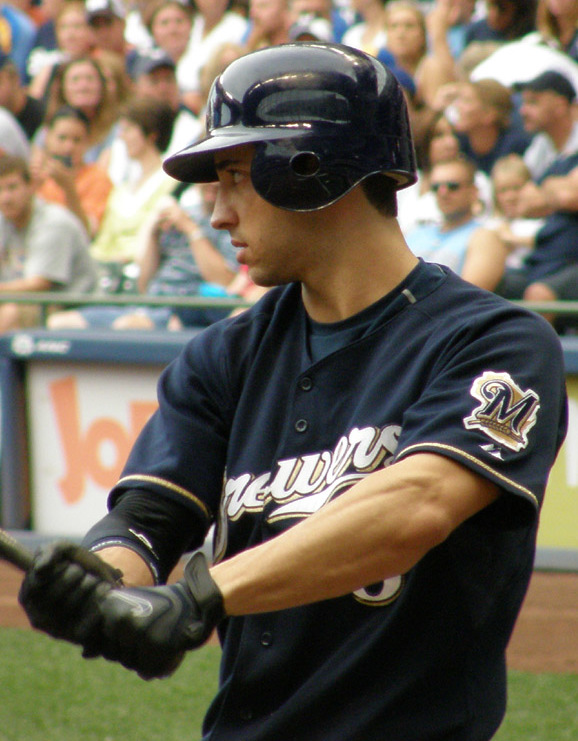
Ryan Braun, the 2011 National League Most Valuable Player and a six-time MLB All-Star, played for the West Virginia Power in 2005 while in the Milwaukee Brewers organization.

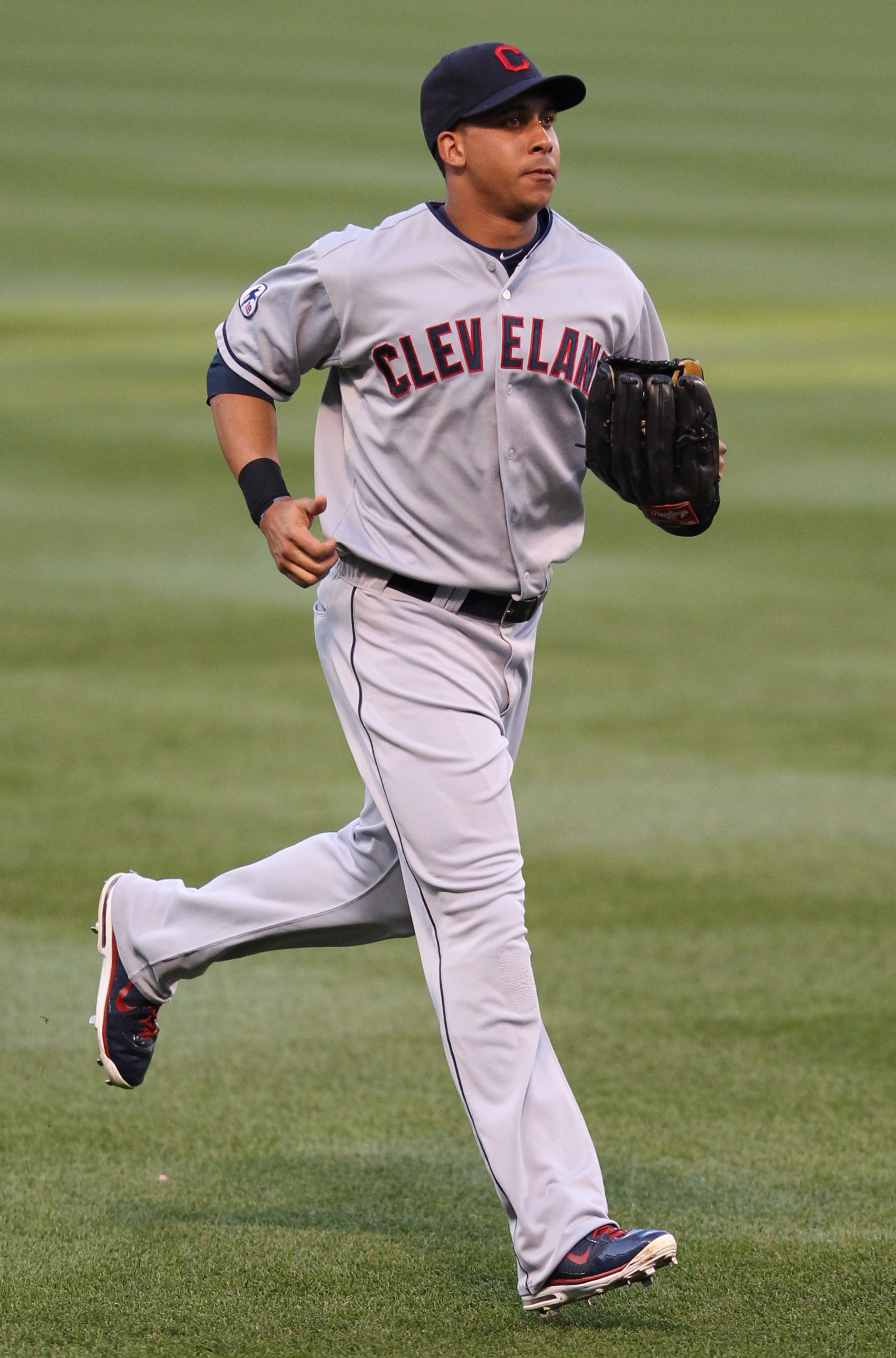
Michael Brantley, pictured during his tenure with Cleveland, played for the West Virginia Power in 2006 and 2007.

- Jeremy Affeldt (1999)
  3× World Series champion (2010, 2012, 2014)
- Elvis Alvarado (2019)
- Josh Bell (2012–13)
  MLB All-Star (2019)
- Michael Brantley (2006–07)
  5× MLB All-Star (2014, 2017–2019, 2021); World Series champion (2022)
- Ryan Braun (2005)
  6× MLB All-Star (2008–2012, 2015); 2007 NL Rookie of the Year; 2011 NL Most Valuable Player
- Lorenzo Cain (2006)
  2× MLB All-Star; ALCS MVP (2014); World Series champion (2015); Gold Glove Award (2019)
- Rodolfo Castro (2018)
- Tony Cogan (2000)
- Carlos Corporán (2005)
- Oneil Cruz (2017–18)
- Elías Díaz (2011–12)
  MLB All-Star (2023)
- Robinzon Díaz (2004)
- Brendan Donnelly (1995) MLB All-Star (2003)
- Alcides Escobar (2005)
  MLB All-Star (2015); ALCS MVP (2015); World Series champion (2015); Gold Glove Award (2015)
- Yovani Gallardo (2005)
  MLB All-Star (2010); 1× Silver Slugger (2010)
- Mat Gamel (2005–06)
- Logan Gilbert (2019)
  MLB All-star (2024)
- Jimmy Gobble (2000)
- Taylor Green (2007)
- Robbie Grossman (2009)
- Ke'Bryan Hayes (2016)
  Gold Glove Award (2023)
- Trevor Hoffman (1990–91)
  7× MLB All-Star (1998–2000, 2002, 2006, 2007, 2009); 2× NL saves leader (1998, 2006); 2nd all time in career saves (601); National Baseball Hall of Fame inductee (2018)
- Clay Holmes (2013)
  2× All-Star (2022, 2024)
- Norris Hopper (1999-00)
- Hernán Iribarren (2005)
- Danny Jackson (1990) 2× All-Star
- JaCoby Jones (2014)
- Jarred Kelenic (2019)
- Mitch Keller (2016)
  MLB All-Star (2023)
- Matt LaPorta (2007)
- Jason LaRue (1996–97)
- Brandon League (2003)
  MLB All-Star; Pitched a combined no-hitter on June 8, 2012
- Jonathan Lucroy (2008)
  2× All-Star; 1× Silver Slugger (2014)
- Starling Marte (2009)
  2× All-Star (2016, 2022); 2× Gold Glove (2015, 2016)
- Martín Maldonado (2007) Gold Glove Award (2017); World Series champion (2022)
- Shaun Marcum (2004)
- Austin Meadows (2014)
  MLB All-Star (2019)
- Kevin Newman (2015)
- Gregory Polanco (2012)
- Scott Pose (1990)
- Cal Raleigh (2019)
  MLB All-star; Gold Glove (2024); Home Run Derby winner (2025)
- Ryan Roberts (2004)
- Pokey Reese (1992)
  2× Gold Glove Award (1999, 2000); World Series Champion (2004)
- Pablo Reyes (2015)
- Alex Ríos (2001)
  2× MLB All-Star (2006, 2007); World Series champion (2015)
- Julio Rodríguez (2019)
  3× All-Star (2022, 2023, 2025); (2022) AL Rookie of the Year; (2022) AL Most Valuable Player
- B. J. Ryan (1998)
  2× All-Star (2005, 2006)
- Ángel Salomé (2005)
- Austin Shenton (2019)
- Hunter Strickland (2014)
  2× World Series champion (2014, 2019)
- Jameson Taillon (2011)
- Joe Thatcher (2006)
- Brett Tomko (1995)
- Cole Tucker (2015–16)
- Dan Wilson (1990–91)
  MLB All-Star (1996)
- Yaramil Hiraldo (2023)

Bold currently active in MLB

=== National Baseball Hall of Fame alumni ===
The following former Charleston players—spanning all teams past and present—were later inducted into the National Baseball Hall of Fame:

Charleston Alumni in the National Baseball Hall of Fame
Player	Team	Year(s) in Charleston	Position	All-Star Selections	Notable achievements
Trevor Hoffman	Charleston Wheelers	1990–1991	RHP	7× (1998, 1999, 2000, 2002, 2006, 2007, 2009)	• National Baseball Hall of Fame inductee (2018) • 2× NL saves leader (1998, 2006) • 601 career saves (2nd all time) • 2× NL Rolaids Relief Man Award (1998, 2006)
Dave Parker†	Charleston Charlies	1973	RF/DH	7× (1977, 1979–1981, 1985, 1986, 1990)	• National Baseball Hall of Fame inductee (2025) • NL MVP (1978) • 3× Gold Glove (1977–1979) • 3× Silver Slugger (1985, 1986, 1990) • 2× NL batting champion (1977, 1978) • NL RBI leader (1985) • 2× World Series champion (1979, 1989)
Jim Bunning†	Charleston Senators	1956	RHP	9× (1957, 1959, 1961–1964, 1966)	• National Baseball Hall of Fame inductee (1996) • AL wins leader (1957) • 3× Strikeout leader (1959, 1960, 1967) • Pitched a perfect game on June 21, 1964 • Pitched a no-hitter on July 20, 1958
Tony La Russa†	Charleston Charlies	1974	INF	None	• National Baseball Hall of Fame inductee (Manager) (2014) • 3× World Series champion (1989, 2006, 2011) • 4× Manager of the Year (1983, 1988, 1992, 2002) • Second in major league history in victories as a manager (2,884)
Jim Kaat†	Charleston Senators	1960	LHP	3× (1962, 1966, 1975)	• National Baseball Hall of Fame inductee (2022) • 16× Gold Glove Award (1962–1977) • World Series champion (1982) • AL wins leader (1966)

† Did not play for the current franchise but played in Charleston under a different franchise.

=== Charleston Baseball Hall of Fame ===
Class of 2007

- Rod "The Toastman" Blackstone
- Jim Bunning
- Trevor Hoffman
- Dave Parker
- Willie Randolph
- Wheeler Bob

Class of 2008

- Dave Augustine
- Don Cook
- John Dickensheets
- Joe Nuxhall
- Michael Paterno

Class of 2009

- Cal Bailey
- Ryan Braun
- Art Howe
- Tommy John
- Tony La Russa
- Jim Lett
- Kent Tekulve

Class of 2011

- Bob Levine
- Timothy Pollitt

Class of 2014

- Omar Moreno
- Watt Powell

Class of 2015

- 1990 Charleston Wheelers

Class of 2017

- Lanny Frattare
- Bruce Kison
- "Rowdy Alley"

Class of 2018

- Paul Nyden

== Franchise records ==
- Win–loss record entering 2025:

- 5668–5820 (.493) all-time (including Charleston Senators, Marlins, Indians, and Charlies)
- 2478–2593 (.489) franchise total (1987–present)
- 236–268 (.468) as the Charleston Dirty Birds (2021–present)

- League titles all-time: (1914, 1932, 1963, 1977, 1990)
- Most wins in a season: 92 (1991)
- Most losses in a season: 96 (1998)
- Longest winning streak: 0 games (June 5–17, 2022)
- Longest losing streak: 0 games (August 1–10, 2023)
- Pitcher with most wins in a season: Austin Coley (2015) and John Ray (1991) – 16 wins
- Hitter with most home runs in a season: Keon Barnum (2024) – 41 home runs

=== Individual Offensive Records (1987-pres) ===
Career Hits

All-Time Hit Leaders
Rank	Player	Season(s)	Hits
1	Edwin Espinal	2014, 21–22	293
2	Bobby Perna	1991–1992	264
3	Rodney Medina	2002–2004	259
4	Mike Snyder	2001–2002	239
T-5	Raul Tablado	2001–2003	221
T-5	Maikel Jova	2001–2003	221

Career Home Runs

All-time Home Run Leaders
Rank	Player	Season(s)	Home Runs
1	Keon Barnum	2024	41
2	Bobby Bradley	2023	30
3	Edwin Espinal	2014, 21–22	25
T-4	Mark Snyder	2001–2002	24
T-4	Rogelio Noris	2010–2011	24
T-4	Stephen Chapman	2007	24
7	JaCoby Jones	2014	23
T-8	Jason Parsons	1996–1997	23

=== South Atlantic League records ===
- Six home runs in one inning by the Power vs. the Lexington Legends – South Atlantic League record
- Ten combined home runs in one game vs. the Lexington Legends (seven by the Power) – South Atlantic League record

=== Baseball records ===
- Hit 10 home runs in a single game on July 20, 2025, against the Long Island Ducks, tying the professional baseball record originally set by the 1987 Toronto Blue Jays.
