= Brian Esposito =

American baseball player (born 1979)

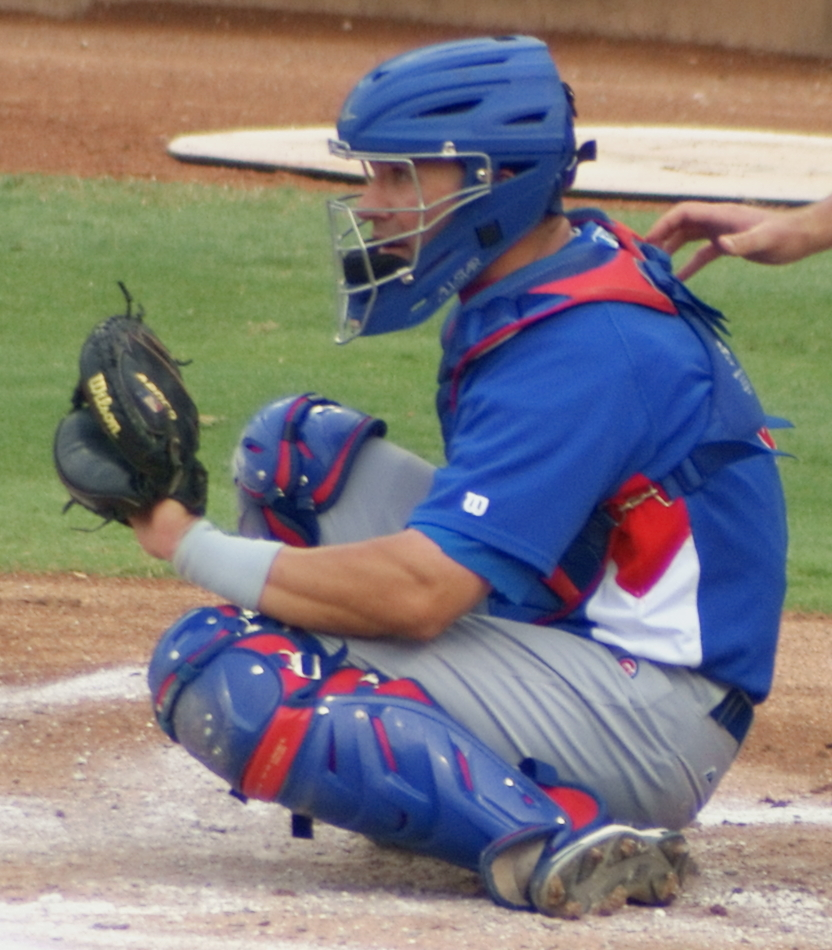
- Esposito with the Iowa Cubs in 2012
- Coach / Catcher
- Born: February 24, 1979 (age 47); Staten Island, New York, U.S.
- Batted: Right Threw: Right

MLB debut
- June 2, 2007, for the St. Louis Cardinals

Last MLB appearance
- September 30, 2010, for the Houston Astros

MLB statistics
- Batting average: .000
- Home runs: 0
- Runs batted in: 0
- Stats at Baseball Reference

Teams
- As player: St. Louis Cardinals (2007); Houston Astros (2010); As coach: San Diego Padres (2024–2025)

Brian James Esposito (born February 24, 1979) is an American former professional baseball catcher and current coach. He appeared in three games in MLB with the St. Louis Cardinals (2007) and Houston Astros (2010).

== Playing career ==
=== Amateur ===
Esposito played college baseball for the University of Connecticut, and in 1999 he played collegiate summer baseball with the Orleans Cardinals of the Cape Cod Baseball League.

=== Boston Red Sox ===
Esposito was drafted by the Boston Red Sox in the 5th round, with the 152nd overall selection, of the 2000 Major League Baseball draft.

=== St. Louis Cardinals ===
Esposito was recalled from the Memphis Redbirds on May 30, 2007, when the Cardinals' starting catcher, Yadier Molina, was placed on the disabled list with a fractured wrist. Esposito made his major league debut June 2 against the Houston Astros as a late-inning defensive replacement for Gary Bennett, but did not record a plate appearance. Esposito returned to Memphis on June 5 after the Cardinals acquired veteran catcher Kelly Stinnett from the Los Angeles Dodgers.

=== Colorado Rockies ===
In 2008, Esposito played for the Double-A Tulsa Drillers in the Colorado Rockies organization and became a free agent at the end of the season.

=== Houston Astros ===
Esposito signed a minor league contract with the Houston Astros on January 14, 2009, and was invited to spring training.

On September 1, 2010, the Astros selected Esposito to their 40-man roster and promoted him to the major leagues. He would get two plate appearances on September 18, against the Cincinnati Reds, when he was a late inning replacement for Jason Castro. In 2 games for Houston, he went 0-for-3. On October 14, Esposito was removed from the 40-man roster and sent outright to the Triple-A Round Rock Express. He elected free agency on October 22.

On October 25, 2010, Esposito re-signed with the Astros organization on a minor league contract. On June 24, 2011, the Astros selected Esposito's contract, adding him to their active roster. He was sent back down to Triple-A on June 29, without making an appearance. On October 10, Esposito elected free agency.

=== Chicago Cubs ===
On December 23, 2011, Esposito signed a minor league contract with the Cincinnati Reds that included an invitation to spring training.

On May 20, 2012, Esposito was signed to a minor league contract by the Chicago Cubs and assigned to their Triple-A affiliate, the Iowa Cubs.

=== Pittsburgh Pirates ===
On March 6, 2013, Esposito signed with the Pittsburgh Pirates as a player-coach.

== Coaching career ==
=== Pittsburgh Pirates ===
Starting in 2018, Esposito was the manager of the Pittsburgh Pirates' Triple-A affiliate, the Indianapolis Indians of the International League. In his first year, he led the 2018 Indians to a 73–67 win–loss record, bringing his career managerial mark to 306–262 (.539) over five years.

Esposito spent 2017 as pilot of the Pirates' Low–A farm team, the West Virginia Black Bears. He previously managed the Pirates Single–A affiliate, the West Virginia Power of the South Atlantic League. In 2014, he served as the last manager in the franchise history of the Jamestown Jammers.

At the end of the 2021 baseball season, his contract was not renewed by the Pirates organization. In seven seasons as a minor league manager with the Pirates, he posted a 433-401 record.

=== San Diego Padres ===
In December 2021 it was announced that Esposito had joined the San Diego Padres organization.

On December 6, 2024, the Padres announced Esposito as their new bench coach. He did not return following the 2025 season.

Preceded by Andy Barkett	Indianapolis Indians manager 2018–2021	Succeeded by Miguel Pérez
