= José Pérez Colmenares =

Venezuelan baseball player (1914–1944)

- First baseman / Outfielder
- Born: July 14, 1914; Villa de Cura, Aragua, Venezuela
- Died: July 25, 1944 (aged 30); Barcelona, Anzoátegui, Venezuela

Member of the Venezuelan

Baseball Hall of Fame
- Induction: 2006 (as part of 1941 AWS team)
Medals
Men's baseball
Representing Venezuela
Amateur World Series
Gold medal – first place	1941 Havana	Team

José Pérez Colmenares (July 14, 1914 – July 25, 1944) was a baseball pioneer in Venezuela and a member of the National Team that captured the Baseball World Cup in its 1941 edition. Pérez batted and threw lefthanded. He was born in Villa de Cura, Aragua.

In his playing days, Pérez was regarded by his versatility to play both outfield corners and first base. A solid average defender with a strong throwing arm, he showed good footwork around first base and was able to pick throws out of the dirt well. Strictly a line-drive hitter with little power, he placed more emphasis on speed and running the bases aggressively.

== Career ==
At age 17, Pérez debuted professionally in 1931 in the newly created Liga Nacional de Béisbol, which had stabilized the first national championship of first division in Venezuela since its inauguration in 1930.

Pérez moved around for a while, as the circuit shifted players in anytime as needed to help new teams stay afloat. He entered the league with the Latinos BBC, playing for them in his rookie season before joining the Águilas BBC in 1932. After that he had a number of stints with clubs such as Lucana, Senadores, Deportivo Caracas (twice), Cardenales (twice), Valdés (twice) and Magallanes in the next nine seasons spanning 1933–1941.

The hard work paid off when Pérez made the Venezuelan pre-selection team in 1941, then was added to the national team roster for the Baseball World Cup tournament to be played in Cuba in October.

The Venezuelan team prevailed in six of its seven games, with the only defeat coming to Dominican Republic, before facing the undefeated Cubans in the last game of the schedule. Venezuela closed the tournament with a 4–1 victory over Cuba, a disappointing final for 30,000 people gathered at La Tropical Stadium in Havana. With both clubs tied at 7–1 after more than two weeks of play, the visitors to settle proudly for the result. Nevertheless, the overconfident Cubans insisted on an extra playoff game, which was played on October 28, 1941. As a result, Daniel Canónico won a pitching duel with Connie Marrero and defeated the Cuban squad by a score of 3–1. This was the first Venezuelan baseball team to win an international tournament, where Pérez drove in five runs and scored 11 times, while hitting a .275 batting average in the nine contests.

Following his productive performance in the World Cup, Pérez joined the debuting Cervecería Caracas club during the 1942–43 and 1943–44 First Division tournaments. He won the batting title in his second season for Cervecería, hitting a .456 average in 18 games. He also led the league in hits (31) and runs batted in (13), during what turned out to be his last baseball appearance.

Shortly after finishing the 1943–44 season, Pérez died in a plane crash in Barcelona, Anzoátegui, just eleven days after his 30th birthday.

== Legacy ==
The Estadio José Pérez Colmenares, named after him, is a multi-purpose stadium located in Maracay, Aragua. Opened in 1969, the stadium holds 12,650 people and serves as the home of the Tigres de Aragua club of the Venezuelan Professional Baseball League.

Besides, José Pérez Colmenares and his teammates on the 1941 World Cup champion team were enshrined as a unit in the Venezuelan Baseball Hall of Fame and Museum in 2006.
