= Villa de Cura =

- Villa de San Luis Rey de Cura
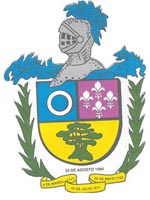
- Coat of arms

- Location within Venezuela
- Coordinates: 10°02′18″N 67°29′21″W
- Country: Venezuela
- State: Aragua
- Municipality: Zamora Municipality
- Founded: 25 May 1722

Area
  - Total: 22.5 km^{2} (8.7 sq mi)
- Elevation: 526 m (1,726 ft)

Population (2011)
  - Total: 89,364
  - Density: 3,970/km^{2} (10,300/sq mi)
  - Demonym: Villacurano/a
- Time zone: UTC−4 (VET)
- Postal code: 2126
- Area code: 0244
- Climate: Aw

Villa de Cura or Villa de San Luis Rey de Cura (Spanish pronunciation: [ˈbiʝa ðe san lwis rej ðe ˈkuɾa]) is the main town in the Zamora district of the Aragua state in Venezuela.

it is best known for being one of the all-male children choirs in the country, Niños Cantores de Villa de Cura (Villa de Cura Choirboys). The town is also well known by its chicharrones and cachapas, all local foods.

== Prominent residents ==
- Amador Bendayán, (1920–1989) was a Venezuelan actor and entertainer.
- Consuelo Fernández, (1797-1814) was a resistance fighter in the Venezuelan War of Independence, given the honor of "heroine" Venezuelan War of Independence
- José Pérez Colmenares, (1914–1944) was a baseball pioneer in Venezuela and a member of the National Team that captured the Baseball World Cup in 1941 Baseball World Cup
- Eduardo Escobar, (born 1989) is a Venezuelan professional MLB third baseman for the New York Mets.
- Hernán Pérez, (born 1991) is a Venezuelan professional baseball utility player in the Atlanta Braves.
