= Diannet Blanco =

Venezuelan human rights activist

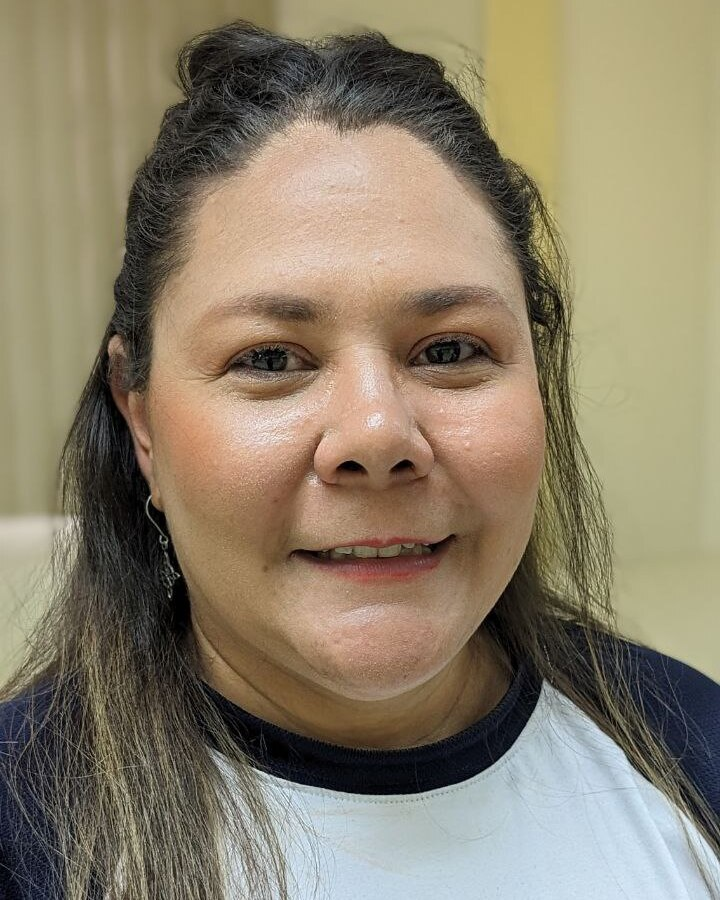
- Blanco in 2024
- Born: Guatire, Miranda, Venezuela
- Education: Central University of Venezuela
- Occupation: Human rights activist
- Known for: Participating in the 2017 Venezuelan protests

Diannet Blanco Prieto is a Venezuelan human rights activist and former political prisoner. She is the coordinator of the Committees for the Defence of Human Rights which campaigns for the rights of people living in impoverished areas of Caracas. Blanco was subjected to an enforced disappearance and detained for a year after participating in the 2017 Venezuelan protests.

== Early life and education ==
Blanco was born and raised in Guatire, Miranda, Venezuela. Her paternal grandfather, Eustoquio Genaro Blanco, was a maroon from Curiepe who was imprisoned after opposing the dictatorship of Marcos Pérez Jiménez; while her grandmother, Luisa Matilde, was a teacher from Guárico who was part of the underground anti-dictatorship movement.

She attended Liceo Vicente Emilio Sojo, where she was vice president of its student centre. Blanco went on to study at the Central University of Venezuela, where she trained as a teacher. During her time at university, she served as president of the student centre within the school of education, and subsequently was elected as secretary of demands for the Federation of University Centres. Blanco went on to obtain a master's degree in women's studies.

== Activism ==
Blanco advocated for the formation of Comités Populares de Derechos Humanos (lit. 'Popular Human Rights Committees') in poor neighbourhoods of Caracas, with the goal of demanding quality public services, and denouncing abuses by members of the police and the armed forces.

During the 2017 Venezuelan protests, Blanco helped provide first aid supplies for voluntary paramedics from Cruz Verde. On 20 May, Blanco was arrested by armed police officers who raided her apartment where medical supplies were being held. Blanco was subjected to an enforced disappearance, during which time she reported receiving "cruel and inhumane" treatment, including being held in a cell with 26 other women with poor ventilation and a lack of sanitary supplies and water, whilst being accused of "treason" and the "usurpation of military attire". Blanco's detention was criticised by human rights groups, including the Centro de Justicia y Paz. Blanco was released from detention on 1 June 2018 as part of a Supreme Tribunal of Justice of Venezuela in exile ruling that saw 39 political prisoners released from state custody.

In 2022, the Centro de Justicia y Paz reported that Blanco had been subjected to harassment and monitoring as a result of her publicly demanding the release of her husband, Gabriel Blanco, following his arrest, including calling on the Inter-American Commission on Human Rights to intervene.

Blanco contributed a chapter to the book Ahora van a conocer el diablo. 10 testimonios de presos torturados por el chavismo (lit. 'Now They Will Know the Devil: 10 Testimonies of Prisoners Tortured by Chavismo'). In 2024, she appeared in the documentary film Ecos de libertad: historias de El Helicoide (lit. 'Echoes of Freedom: Stories from El Helicoide'), alongside other former political prisoners.

== Personal life ==
Blanco is married to trade unionist Gabriel Blanco, who himself became a political prisoner following his arrest in 2022.
