= Consuelo Fernández =

Venezuelan resistance fighter (1797–1814)

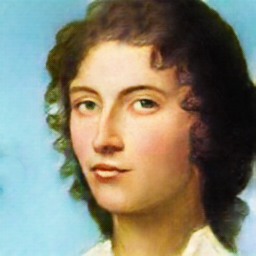
Consuelo Fernández portrait

Consuelo Fernández (1797-1814) was a resistance fighter in the Venezuelan War of Independence, given the honor of "heroine".

== Biography ==
Born in Villa de Cura, she was the sister of Manuel Fernández, who joined the military unit of José Félix Ribas. Feigning a friendship with a Spaniard Royalist Colonel named Pérez, she learned of plans to attack her brother's unit. She wrote him a message which was intercepted. Blamed for revolutionary insurgency, she was imprisoned. Pérez proposed matrimony, offering that if she agreed and renounced the cause of independence, she could be free. She rejected his proposal, purportedly saying "For my part, I could never unite myself to that which inspires in me so much contempt. Long live the homeland! Long live independence!" While waiting to be shot in the Villa de Cura square, her father ran to hug her; they were both subsequently shot.
