= Puerto Cumarebo =

- City
- Nickname: La Perta de Falcon (The Pearl of Falcon)
- Location within Venezuela
- Coordinates: 11°29′10″N 69°21′01″W
- Country: Venezuela
- State: Falcón
- Municipality: Zamora
- City Established: May 17, 1845

Area
  - Total: 393 km^{2} (152 sq mi)
- Elevation: 13 m (43 ft)

Population
  - Total: 33,166
  - Density: 84.4/km^{2} (219/sq mi)
- Demonym: Cumarebero/a
- Time zone: UTC-4:30 (UTC)
- postal code: 4102
- area code: 0268
- Climate: Aw

Puerto Cumarebo capital of Zamora Municipality, Falcón state, Venezuela is located 40 miles east of Coro. Emerges in 1600 as population of black "Loangos" people escaped from Curacao. It was named after Cacique Cumarebo, head of the county to the arrival of the Spanish. On May 17, 1845 Canton of Pueblo Cumarebo moved to Puerto Cumarebo and thereafter the port acquires social and political organization of importance to the state. Called The Pearl of Falcón, Cumarebo consists mostly of coasts and plains crossed by rivers and small streams, as well hills gives it a mountain appearance, its climate is 27 °C, with an altitude of 13 meters.

== Economy ==
The Creole Petroleum Corporation found oil near Cumarebo in 1931.

Its economy is based on farming, fishing and handicraft, which predominates in the manufacture of furniture and fixtures of cactus, basketry, carvings in limestone, woven hats and brooms. Also has several banks, a cement plant and a dairy company, and there is often trading in Bolívar Street, located in the center of this town.

== Typical foods ==
The Cumarebera cuisine is based on seafood in all its varieties, caldo e'playa, pickled mackerel, school shark mojito, rey, among others, the arepa pelada, arepa jojota, natilla, beef cheese, fried pork, doritos, pigeon pea, tapirama, dulce de leche, dulce de lechoza, and dabudeque.

== Places of interest ==
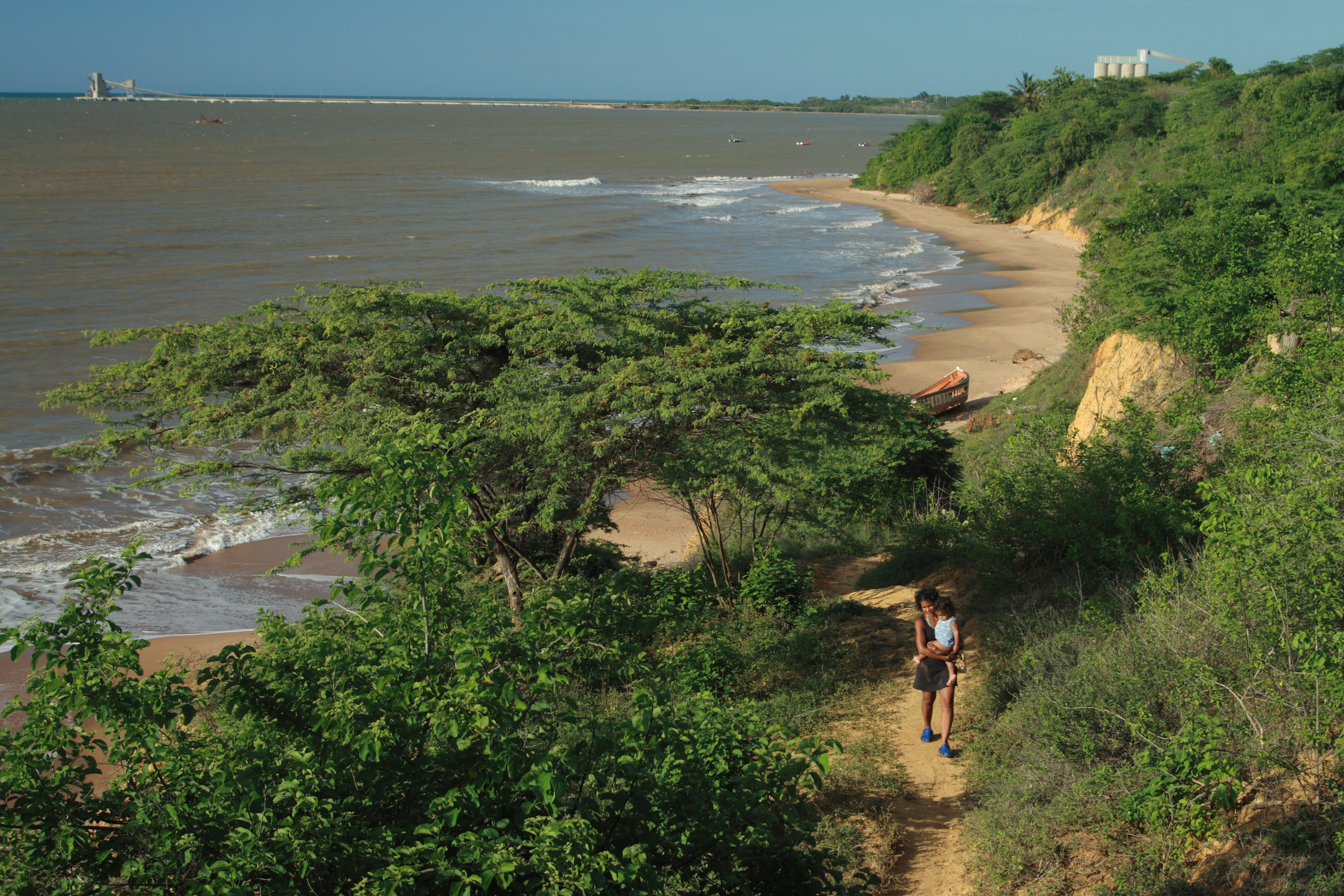
Beach in Puerto Cumarebo. In the background can be seen Holcim company facilities in Venezuela.

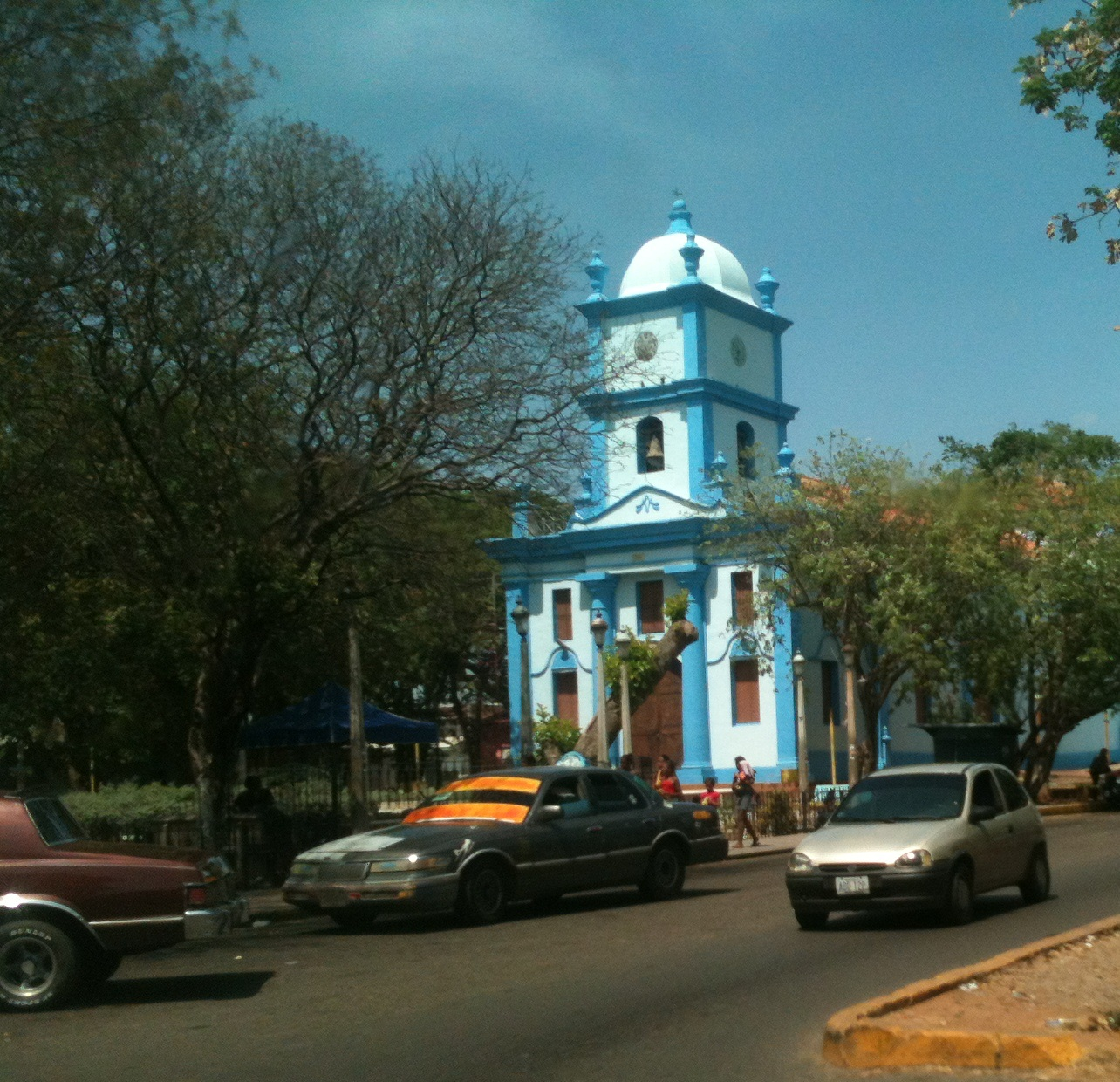
La Candelaria Church in Cumarebo Bolivar Square

- Church Nuestra Señora de La Candelaria; Data from 1887, Greco-Roman style, carved wooden doors to chisel, are the brainchild of author Josephine Leidenz.
- Balcony Jurado; Started building in 1914, Greco-Roman style. Clean work of masonry (limestone). Property of General León Jurado President of Falcón State (1912-1918).
- Pueblo Cumarebo; It is a village in the mountainous area of Cumarebo, known for hosting several days to founding father Simón Bolívar, in addition to its landscapes and springs that cross, along with a church from the 17th century.
- Zamora Municipality Cultural Centre "Simon Bolivar"; The first hotel in Zamora, later the ambulance headquarters "Francisco Bustamante". Later headquarters of the School of Arts and Crafts and currently Cultural Centre of the Township where they make life: Zamora Boys Choir, Youth Orchestra, School of Music Juan José Landaeta, Simón Bolívar Library, the Theatre Workshop "Cumarebo Siempre" and Cumarebo Dances.

== Festivities ==
- January 1: Crazies of Cumarebo (Locos de Cumarebo)
- January 2: Trader Day (Día del Comerciante)
- January 6: The Three Kings Day (Día de los Santos Reyes)
- February 2: Candlemas Day (Día de la Candelaria)
- May 1: Feast of St. Joseph the Worker (Fiestas de San José Obrero)
- May 17: Puerto Cumarebo Day (Día de Puerto Cumarebo)
- October 9: Viridianas Day (Día de las Viridianas)
- November 30: Ringing Drum (Repique del Tambor)
- December 28: The Holy Innocents Day (Día de los Santos Inocentes)
