= Zamora Municipality, Aragua =

Zamora Municipality Municipio Zamora
- Municipality
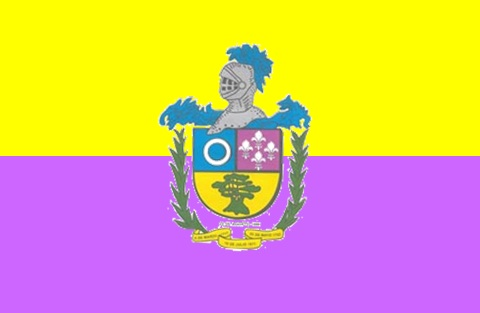
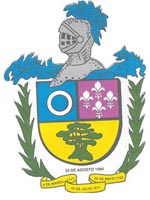
- Flag Coat of arms

- Location in Aragua

- Location in Venezuela
- Coordinates: 10°03′05″N 67°29′11″W
- Country: Venezuela
- State: Aragua
- Municipal seat: Villa de Cura

Government
  - Mayor: Anahís Palacios Pantoja (PSUV)

Area
  - Total: 689.3 km^{2} (266.1 sq mi)

Population (2011)
  - Total: 144,759
  - Density: 210.0/km^{2} (543.9/sq mi)
- Time zone: UTC−4 (VET)
- Area code(s): 0244

Zamora Municipality is one of the 18 municipalities (municipios) that makes up the Venezuelan state of Aragua and, according to the 2011 census by the National Institute of Statistics of Venezuela, the municipality has a population of 144,759. The town of Villa de Cura is the municipal seat of the Zamora Municipality.

== Name ==
The municipality is one of several named "Zamora Municipality" for the 19th century Venezuelan soldier Ezequiel Zamora.

== History ==
The city of Villa de Cura was founded on May 25, 1722.

== Demographics ==
The Zamora Municipality, according to a 2007 population estimate by the National Institute of Statistics of Venezuela, has a population of 145,742 (up from 127,595 in 2000). This amounts to 8.8% of the state's population. The municipality's population density is 224.56 inhabitants per square kilometre (581.6/sq mi).

== Government ==
The mayor of the Zamora Municipality is Aldo Lovera, elected on November 23, 2008, with 55% of the vote. He replaced Stefano Mangione shortly after the elections. The municipality is divided into five parishes; Capital Zamora, Magdaleno, San Francisco de Asís, Valles de Tucutunemo, and Augusto Mijares (separated from San Francisco de Asís parish effective 16/12/97).
