= Guatire =

City in Miranda, Venezuela

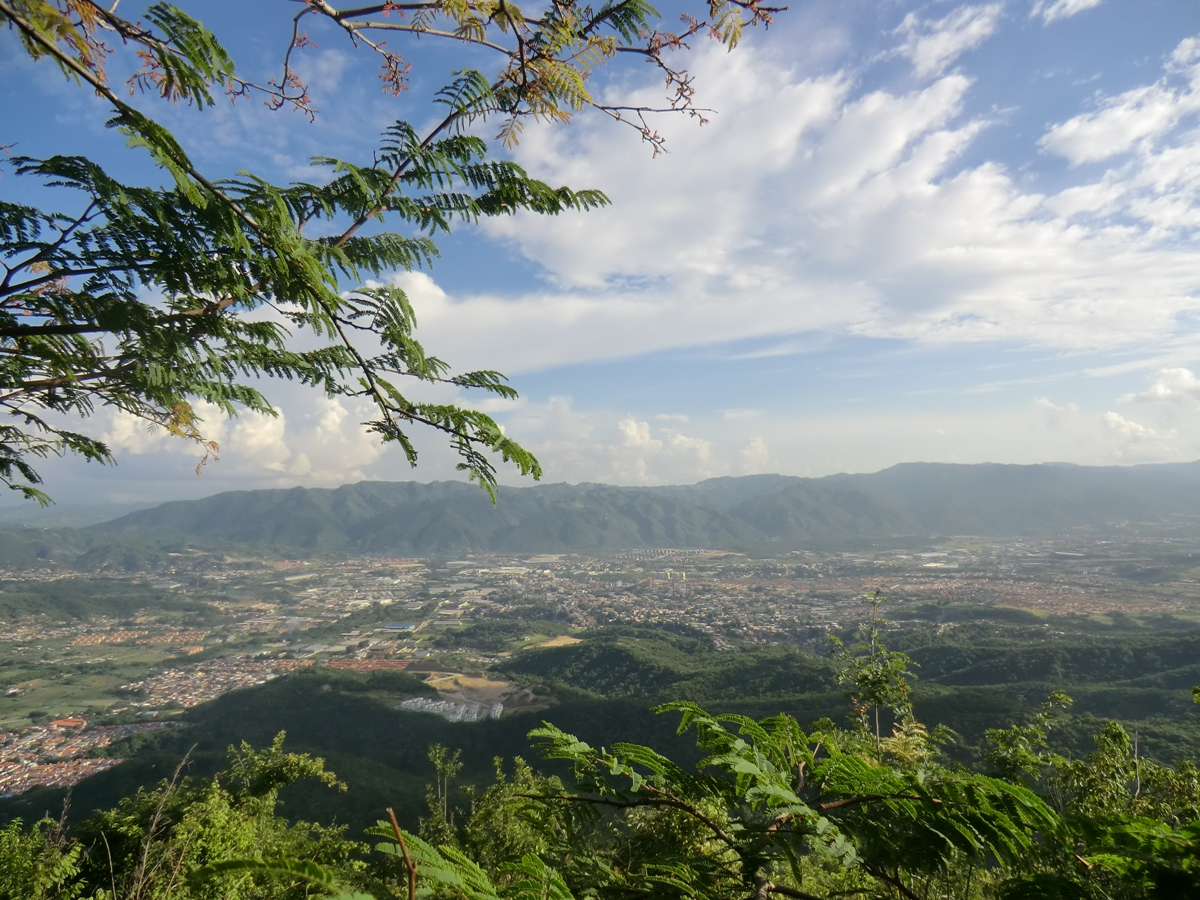

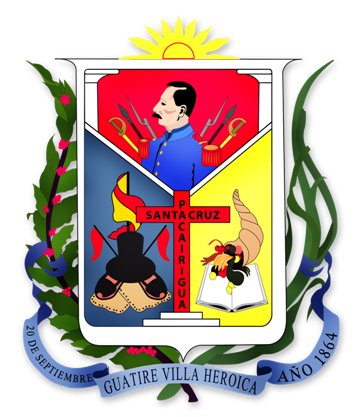
- Flag Coat of arms
- Nickname: Villa Heroica
- Location within Venezuela
- Coordinates: 10°28′18″N 66°32′26″W
- Country: Venezuela
- State: Miranda
- Municipality: Zamora Municipality

Area
  - City: 214 km^{2} (83 sq mi)
- Elevation: 328 m (1,076 ft)

Population (2019)
  - City: 180,500
  - Estimate (2026): 212,688
  - Rank: 24th in Venezuela
  - Urban: 502,000
  - Metro: 5,200,000 (Greater Caracas)
- Demonym: Guatireño/a
- Time zone: UTC-4 (AST)
- Postal code: 1221
- Area code: 0212
- Climate: Aw

Guatire is a city in Zamora Municipality, Miranda, Venezuela. Today, Guatire has virtually merged with its neighbour, Guarenas, forming the Guarenas-Guatire conurbation.

It is part of "La gran Caracas" (Greater Caracas) because it is near Caracas (Venezuela's capital).

== Notable people ==
- Francisco Álvarez (born 2001), professional baseball catcher for the New York Mets
- Rómulo Betancourt (1908–1981), known as "The Father of Venezuelan Democracy", 47th and 54th President of Venezuela
- Sara Bendahan (1906–1946), a physician and the first Venezuelan woman to complete her medical degree in that country
- Diannet Blanco, human rights activist
- Leandro Cedeño (born 1998), baseball player
- Miguel Pérez (born 1983), former professional baseball catcher for the Cincinnati Reds
- Régulo Rico (1877–1960), musician, conductor, composer, educator
