= Sara Bendahan =

Venezuelan physician

- Born: Sara Rosa M. Bendahan; February 1906; Guatire, Venezuela
- Died: 1946
- Education: Central University of Venezuela
- Known for: First Venezuelan woman to complete her medical degree in that country
- Children: (daughter)

Sara Rosa M. Bendahan (1906–1946) was a physician and the second Venezuelan woman to complete her medical degree in that country. She was born in Guatire in February 1906, and her parents were Moroccan Jewish immigrants.

== Biography ==
In September 1924 she began studying at the Central University of Venezuela. In her third year of studying medicine she suffered from pulmonary tuberculosis and went to Los Teques to recover, but did not stop studying and passed her third year (of six) exams. However, due to the deaths of family and friends she initially left medical school without graduating, needing only to complete her thesis and examination.

She did this and graduated as a doctor on July 31, 1939, from Central University of Venezuela. She was appointed by her graduating classmates to give the speech at the ceremony where she was awarded the title, Doctor of Medical Sciences, becoming the first Venezuelan woman to earn that degree in her country. In that speech she asked:

"What else is needed to not smile happily even at this victory? Not that pride takes over my spirit, oh no! And I consider it as a scientific triumph, but rather as an extraordinary triumph over the environment, prejudice, envy, the circumstances that have surrounded me, my poor state of health and therefore death, the time that has passed since the completion of my studies, etc., etc. (…) Times have changed very quickly. The man became familiar with the presence of Eva in the classrooms and today in all the faculties numerous female students are studying, we are happy to anticipate that next year two intelligent compatriots of ours will finish their medical studies.”

In her speech notes, she acknowledges other female trailblazers in medicine.

"To the memory of Dr. Virginia Pereira Álvarez, the first woman who attempted medical studies in Venezuela, but who finally carried them out in the United States; Lya Imber, who was the first woman to graduate as a doctor in Venezuela as a foreigner; and Elizabeth Garret Anderson, the first woman in the world to embrace Medical Sciences, thus signaling a new era for those of her sex."

She died only six years later.

Bendahan had a daughter.
