= George Baumgardner =

American baseball player (1891-1970)

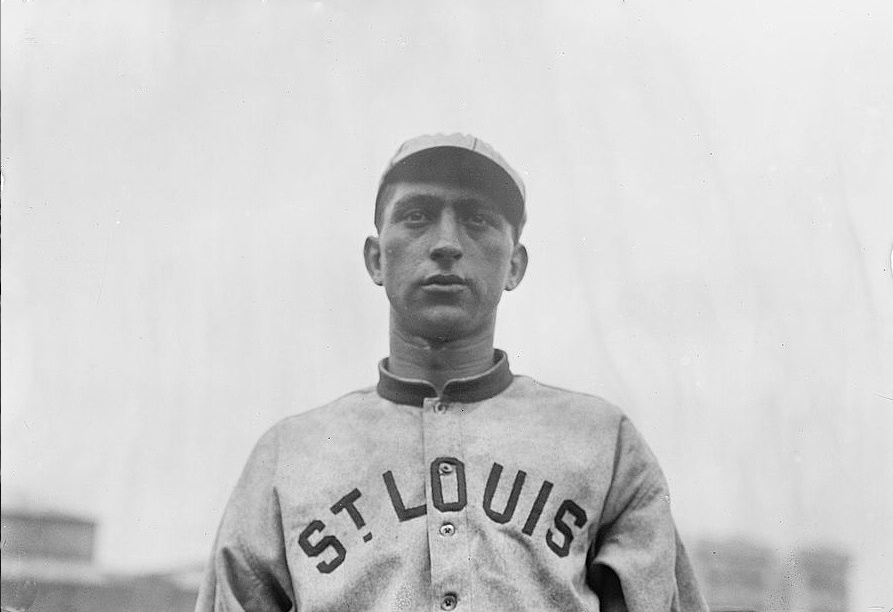
- Pitcher
- Born: July 22, 1891; Barboursville, West Virginia
- Died: December 13, 1970 (aged 79); Barboursville, West Virginia
- Batted: Left Threw: Right

MLB debut
- April 14, 1912, for the St. Louis Browns

Last MLB appearance
- May 15, 1916, for the St. Louis Browns

MLB statistics
- Win–loss record: 38-49
- Earned run average: 3.22
- Strikeouts: 283
- Stats at Baseball Reference

Teams
- St. Louis Browns (1912–1916)

George Washington Baumgardner (July 22, 1891 – December 13, 1970) was a Major League Baseball pitcher who played for the St. Louis Browns. His key pitch was the fastball.
