= Ken Joyce =

American baseball coach (born 1964)

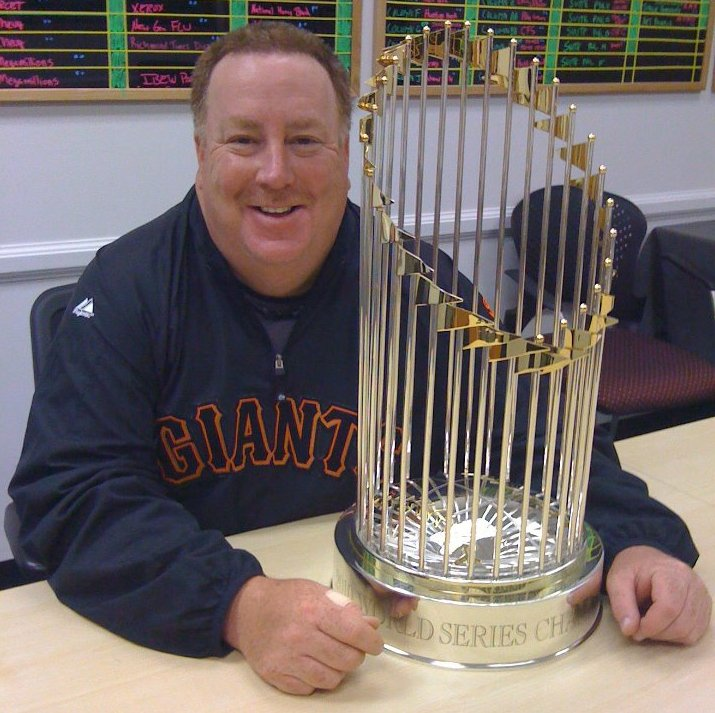
- Joyce with the 2014 World Series trophy
- Manager
- Born: October 28, 1964 (age 61); Portland, Maine, U.S.
- Bats: Right Throws: Right

Ken Joyce (born October 28, 1964) is an American-born baseball coach and manager.

== Baseball career ==
Joyce was a member of the 1983 Deering High School Class A State Champion baseball team before attending the University of Southern Maine. A four-year starter as an infielder, he set an NAIA record with seven hits in a NAIA Regional tournament before participating in the 1985 NAIA College World Series. (This record has been tied many times and was broken in 2009.)

Joyce became the assistant baseball coach at the University of Southern Maine and coached in the 1989 NCAA Division III World Series. Joyce became a middle school physical education teacher before joining the Portland Sea Dogs as a volunteer bullpen coach in 1994. The volunteer stint turned into his first professional coaching contract when he was named hitting coach of the Sea Dogs in 1996.

Joyce became the hitting coach for the Utica Blue Sox of the New York-Penn League in 1997. The Marlins promoted Joyce to manager of the Blue Sox, a position he held in 1998 and 1999. He became the interim head baseball coach at New England College in the spring of 2000. In 2000 and 2001, Joyce coached and managed the independent Northern League Catskill Cougars and the Adirondack Lumberjacks, respectively.

The Toronto Blue Jays hired Joyce as the hitting coach for the Medicine Hat Blue Jays in 2002. He was promoted to the Double-A New Haven Ravens in 2003. New Haven led the Eastern League with a .293 average, which topped the 10-year franchise's record by 11 percentage points. In 2004, Joyce managed the Blue Jays' Class A Charleston Alley Cats in the South Atlantic League to an 84–56 record. The Blue Jays relocated their Class A affiliate, with Joyce managing the Lansing Lugnuts of the Midwest League in 2005 and 2006. He returned to the Eastern League in 2007 and 2008 as the hitting coach for the New Hampshire Fisher Cats. In 2009 Joyce became the hitting coach for the Blue Jays Triple-A Las Vegas 51's of the Pacific Coast League, leading them to a .290 team batting average.

Joyce joined the San Francisco Giants in 2010 as hitting coach for the Triple-A Fresno Grizzlies. He then returned to the Eastern League as the hitting coach for the Double-A Richmond Flying Squirrels from 2011 to 2016. He was the hitting coach for the Scottsdale Scorpions of the 2011 Arizona Fall League where he worked with Mike Trout and Bryce Harper, who became 2012 AL and NL Rookies of the Year, respectively. In 2016 he stepped way from professional baseball to spend time with his family.

In 2017 the New York Yankees hired Joyce as the hitting coach for the Class A Charleston RiverDogs of the South Atlantic League. He spent half the season with Charleston and half the season with the Gulf Coast League Yankees West. Joyce returned to the New York-Penn League as the hitting coach for the Staten Island Yankees in 2018 and 2019. He was selected to as the hitting coach for the Surprise Saguaros of the Arizona Fall League in 2019 before returning to the Eastern League with the Double-A Trenton Thunder in the pandemic-canceled 2020 season.

Joyce coached for the independent West Virginia Power in 2021.

Joyce returned to the affiliated minor leagues in 2022, joining the Milwaukee Brewers organization. He was the hitting coach for the Single-A Carolina Mudcats in 2022, followed by the High-A Wisconsin Timber Rattlers in 2023 and 2024.

Joyce was inducted into the University of Southern Maine Husky Hall of Fame in 1998. He was also inducted into the Maine Baseball Hall of Fame in 2001.

Managerial record
| Year | Team | Affiliation | League | W | L | Pct. |
|---|---|---|---|---|---|---|
| 1988 | Utica Blue Sox | Marlins | NY-Penn | 35 | 41 | .461 |
| 1999 | Utica Blue Sox | Marlins | NY-Penn | 42 | 33 | .560 |
| 2001 | Adirondack Lumberjack | Independent | Northern East | 26 | 28 | .481 |
| 2004 | Charleston Alley Cats | Blue Jays | South Atlantic | 84 | 56 | .600 |
| 2005 | Lansing Lugnuts | Blue Jays | Midwest | 70 | 69 | .504 |
| 2006 | Lansing Lugnuts | Blue Jays | Midwest | 72 | 65 | .526 |
| 2014 | Richmond Flying Squirrels | Giants | Eastern | 13 | 8 | .619 |
| Totals: | | | | 342 | 300 | .533 |
