= Andy Barkett =

American baseball player (born 1974)

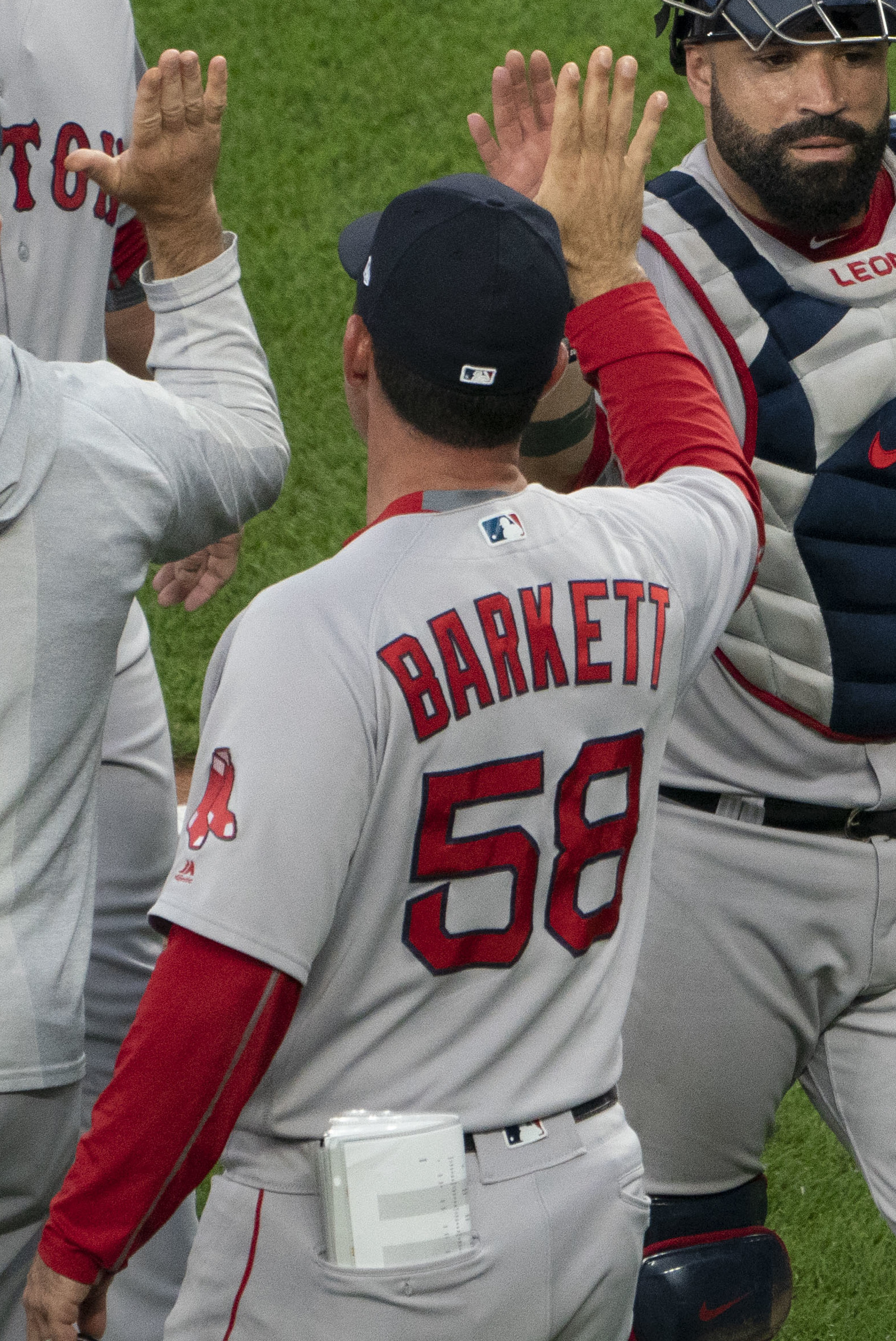
- Barkett with the Boston Red Sox in 2018

Chicago White Sox
- Outfielder / First baseman
- Born: September 5, 1974 (age 52); Miami, Florida, U.S.
- Batted: Left Threw: Left

MLB debut
- May 28, 2001, for the Pittsburgh Pirates

Last MLB appearance
- June 24, 2001, for the Pittsburgh Pirates

MLB statistics
- Batting average: .304
- Home runs: 1
- Runs batted in: 3
- Stats at Baseball Reference

Teams
- As player: Pittsburgh Pirates (2001); As coach: Boston Red Sox (2018–2019); Chicago White Sox (2021–present)

Career highlights and awards
- World Series champion (2018)

Andrew Jon Barkett (born September 5, 1974) is an American professional baseball coach, former Minor League Baseball manager, and former Major League Baseball (MLB) player who appeared in 17 games for the Pittsburgh Pirates as a first baseman and outfielder in 2001.

== Playing career ==
Born in Miami, Barkett played college baseball for the NC State Wolfpack from 1992 to 1995. As a player, he threw and batted left-handed and was listed at 6 feet 1 inch (1.85 m) and 205 pounds (93 kg).

In 1995, Barkett made his professional debut with the Butte Copper Kings of the Pioneer League. In 45 games with Butte, Barkett had a .333 average, 5 home runs and 51 runs batted in. He was acquired by the Texas Rangers on August 10. Barkett finished the season with the Charleston RiverDogs of the South Atlantic League, a Class A affiliate of the Rangers. He batted .218 over 21 games with Charleston, driving in 12 runs.

Barkett remained in the Rangers organization for the next four seasons, twice batting over .300 at the Triple-A level before drawing his release in May 2000. After a brief stint in the Atlanta Braves system, the Pirates signed Barkett as a free agent in January 2001, setting the stage for his MLB trial. Appearing in 17 games (and starting 11 as a left fielder or first baseman) between May 28 and June 24, Barkett collected 14 hits, hitting .304 with three runs batted in. His hits included two doubles and one home run, struck off Joe Mays of the Minnesota Twins in an inter-league contest at the Hubert H. Humphrey Metrodome on June 9. Barkett returned to Triple-A for the balance of 2001, and spent the remainder of his playing career in the minor league organizations of the Seattle Mariners, Detroit Tigers and Braves. He retired in 2005, after 11 seasons in professional baseball.

== Post-playing career ==
Barkett became a manager in the Tigers' minor league organization in 2007, helming the Class A Short Season Oneonta Tigers of the New York–Penn League; then, from 2008 to 2010, he managed the Class A-Advanced Lakeland Tigers of the Florida State League. On December 14, 2010, it was announced that Barkett would manage the Double-A Jacksonville Suns in the Florida Marlins organization. After holding the Jacksonville post for four seasons (2011–2014), he became the Marlins' assistant minor league hitting coordinator in 2015.

Barkett returned for two seasons to the Pirates' organization, as assistant minor league hitting coordinator (2016) and then as manager of the Triple-A Indianapolis Indians (2017), whom he led to a 79–63 record and first place in the International League's West Division. The Indians fell to the Durham Bulls in the first round of the playoffs, three games to one. His nine-season managerial record, through 2017, is 610–569 (.517).

On November 4, 2017, Barkett was named assistant hitting coach of the Boston Red Sox, working on the staff of new manager Alex Cora, and was in that role when the team won the 2018 World Series. He returned as Boston's assistant hitting coach for the 2019 season, and temporarily took over third base coaching duties during June, when the team's usual third base coach, Carlos Febles, had problems with his right foot. Following the 2019 Red Sox missing the playoffs, Barkett was reportedly dismissed in early October, which was confirmed by the team on October 8.

== Personal life ==
Barkett and his wife, Brandy, have two daughters and a son.

Preceded by Dean Treanor	Indianapolis Indians manager 2017	Succeeded by Brian Esposito
