= Andy O'Connor =

American baseball player (1884-1980)

- Pitcher
- Born: September 14, 1884; Roxbury, Massachusetts, U.S.
- Died: September 26, 1980 (aged 96); Norwood, Massachusetts, U.S.
- Batted: Right Threw: Right

MLB debut
- October 6, 1908, for the New York Highlanders

Last MLB appearance
- October 6, 1908, for the New York Highlanders

MLB statistics
- Win–loss record: 0–1
- Strikeouts: 5
- Earned run average: 10.13
- Stats at Baseball Reference

Teams
- New York Highlanders (1908)

Andrew James O'Connor (September 14, 1884 – September 26, 1980) was an American Major League Baseball pitcher. O'Connor played for the New York Highlanders in 1908. In one career game, he had a 0–1 record, with a 10.13 earned run average. He batted and threw right-handed.

O'Connor was born in Roxbury, Massachusetts. After baseball, O'Connor served as a sole cutter for the Thomas G. Plant Shoe Factory in Jamaica Plain, Massachusetts and in the press offices of the The Boston Post. He also served as a scout for the Boston Red Sox. O'Connor died at the Maple Manor Nursing Home in Norwood, Massachusetts on September 26, 1980 after a long illness.
