= Huntington Blue Sox =

- 1910–1916; Huntington, West Virginia

Minor league affiliations
- Previous classes: Class D
- Previous leagues: Ohio State League (1913-1916); Mountain States League (1911-1912); Virginia Valley League (1910)

Team data
- Previous names: Huntington Blue Sox (1916); Huntington Babes (1915); Huntington Blue Sox (1911-1914); Huntington (1910)

The Huntington Blue Sox were a Mountain States League (1911-1912) and Ohio State League (1913-1914, 1916) minor league baseball team that played during the early 1900s. They were based in Huntington, West Virginia. Players of note include Ernie Alten, Bill Cramer, Lee Fohl, Al Mamaux, Ralph Shafer, Skeeter Shelton, Johnny Siegle, and Dan Tipple. Managers included Ezra Midkiff, Shelton, and Siegle, among others. They were the last team to be based in Huntington until the Huntington Boosters were formed in 1931.
