= Charleston Senators =

- 1910–1960; (1910, 1911 – 1912, 1913 – 1916, 1931 – 1942, 1949 – 1951, 1952 – 1960); Charleston, West Virginia

Minor league affiliations
- Previous classes: Triple-A (1952–1960); Class A (1949–1951); Class C (1931–1942); Class D (1910–1912), (1913–1916)
- League: American Association (1952–1960)
- Previous leagues: Central League (1949–1951); Middle Atlantic League (1931–1942); Ohio State League (1913–1916); Mountain States League (1911–1912); Virginia Valley League (1910)

Major league affiliations
- Previous teams: Washington Senators (1960); Detroit Tigers (1956–1959); Chicago White Sox (1953–1954); Cincinnati Reds (1949–1951); Cleveland Indians (1940–1942); Boston Braves (1939); Detroit Tigers (1934–1938)

Minor league titles
- League titles: 1914, 1932

Team data
- Previous names: Charleston Senators (1910), (1911–1912), (1913–1916), (1931–1942), (1949–1951), (1952–1960)
- Previous parks: Watt Powell Park (1949–1960)

The Charleston Senators were an American minor league baseball team based in Charleston, West Virginia. They were the first professional baseball team to play in Charleston, beginning play in 1910. The team was inactive during a few periods, playing their last game in 1960.

== History ==
The Senators competed in the Class A Central League from 1949 to 1951; the league folded in the fall of 1951, leaving Charleston without an active franchise in Minor League Baseball. Mid-season in 1952, Toledo Mud Hens owner Danny Menendez moved his team to Charleston, following a decline of ticket sales in Toledo. Competing as the Senators, the former Mud Hens played at the Triple-A level in the American Association through 1960.

== See also ==
- Charleston Charlies
- West Virginia Power
