= Reddy Mack =

Irish baseball player (1866–1916)

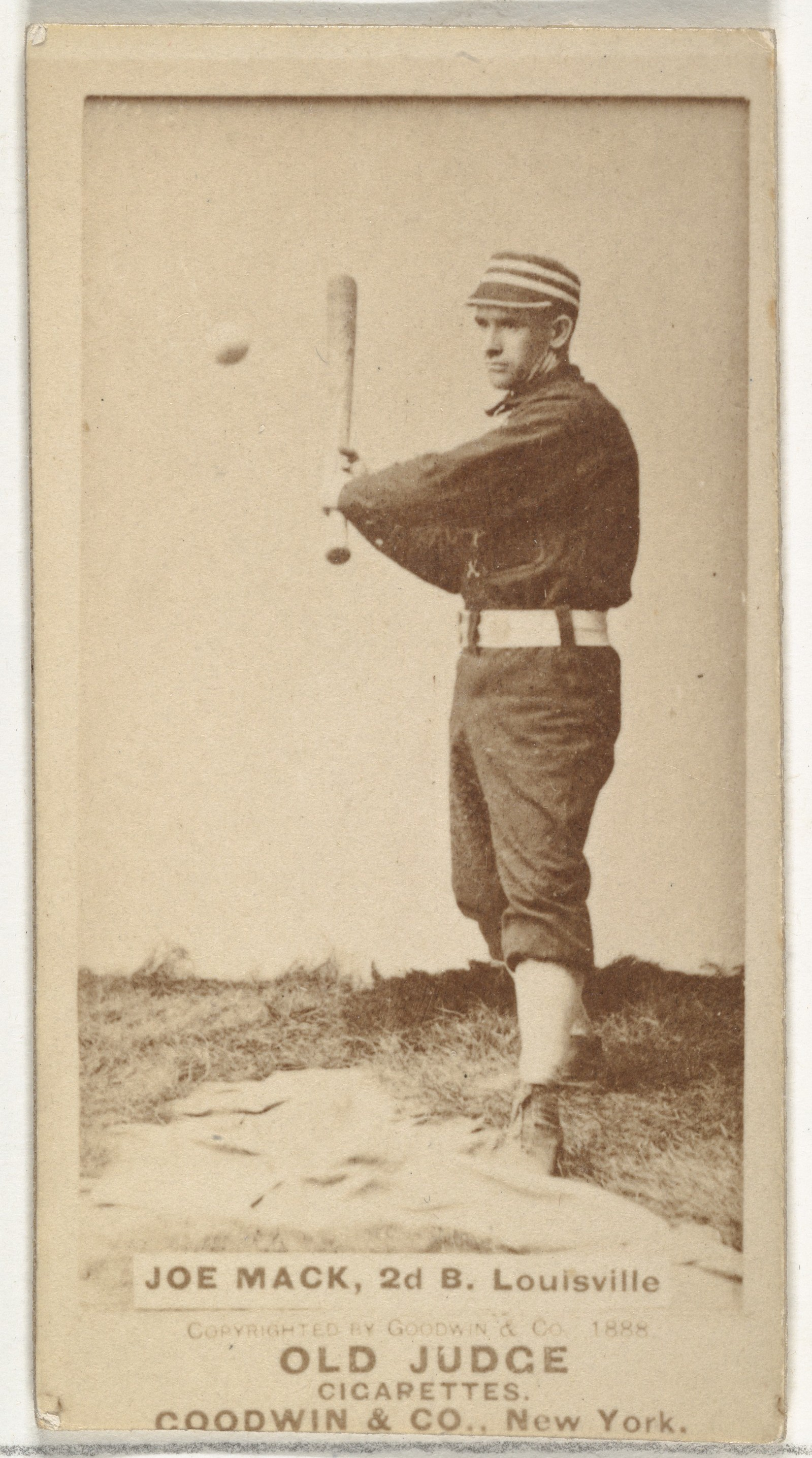
- Second baseman
- Born: May 2, 1866; Belfast, Ireland
- Died: December 30, 1916 (aged 50); Newport, Kentucky, U.S.
- Batted: Right Threw: Unknown

MLB debut
- September 16, 1885, for the Louisville Colonels

Last MLB appearance
- September 30, 1890, for the Baltimore Orioles

MLB statistics
- Batting average: .254
- Home runs: 6
- Runs scored: 381
- Stats at Baseball Reference

Teams
- Louisville Colonels (1885–1888); Baltimore Orioles (1889–1890)

Joseph McNamara (May 2, 1866 – December 30, 1916), known professionally as Reddy Mack, was an Irish-born professional baseball player. He played professional baseball from 1885 to 1890, mainly as a second baseman. Mack played the first four years of his career with the Louisville Colonels, before joining the Baltimore Orioles for the final years of his career. Through his career, he proved to be a mediocre hitter and fielder, except for the 1887 season, where he hit .308 with 147 hits in 128 games.

Mack died in Newport, Kentucky from an accidental fall.

== See also ==
- List of Major League Baseball single-game hits leaders
