= 1952 St. Louis Browns season =

Major League Baseball season

1952 St. Louis Browns
- League: American League
- Ballpark: Sportsman's Park
- City: St. Louis, Missouri
- Record: 64–90 (.416)
- League place: 7th
- Owners: Bill Veeck
- General managers: Bill Veeck
- Managers: Rogers Hornsby, Marty Marion
- Television: KSD (Buddy Blattner)
- Radio: WIL (Buddy Blattner, Dizzy Dean)

The 1952 St. Louis Browns season was a season in American baseball. It involved the Browns finishing 7th in the American League with a record of 64 wins and 90 losses. This was the franchise's penultimate season in St. Louis.

== Offseason ==
- November 27, 1951: Al Widmar, Sherm Lollar, and Tom Upton were traded by the Browns to the Chicago White Sox for Joe DeMaestri, Gordon Goldsberry, Dick Littlefield, Gus Niarhos, and Jim Rivera.

== Regular season ==
In 1952, Rogers Hornsby, an alleged former member of the Ku Klux Klan, took over as manager of the Browns. Despite past accusations of racism, Hornsby was less hesitant to use pitcher Satchel Paige than Indians manager Lou Boudreau had been four years before. Paige was so effective that when Hornsby was fired by Browns owner Bill Veeck, his successor Marty Marion seemed not to want to risk going more than three games without using Paige in some form. By July 4, with Paige having worked in 25 games, Casey Stengel named him to the American League All-Star team, making him the first black pitcher on an AL All-Star team. The All-Star game was cut short after five innings due to rain and Paige never got in. Stengel resolved to name him to the team the following year. Paige finished the year 12–10 with a 3.07 ERA for a team that lost ninety games.

=== Season standings ===
American League
Team	W	L	Pct.	GB	Home	Road
New York Yankees	95	59	.617	—	49‍–‍28	46‍–‍31
Cleveland Indians	93	61	.604	2	49‍–‍28	44‍–‍33
Chicago White Sox	81	73	.526	14	44‍–‍33	37‍–‍40
Philadelphia Athletics	79	75	.513	16	45‍–‍32	34‍–‍43
Washington Senators	78	76	.506	17	42‍–‍35	36‍–‍41
Boston Red Sox	76	78	.494	19	50‍–‍27	26‍–‍51
St. Louis Browns	64	90	.416	31	42‍–‍35	22‍–‍55
Detroit Tigers	50	104	.325	45	32‍–‍45	18‍–‍59

=== Record vs. opponents ===
1952 American League record Sources:
Team	BOS	CWS	CLE	DET	NYY	PHA	SLB	WSH
Boston	—	12–10	9–13	16–6	8–14	12–10	11–11	8–14
Chicago	10–12	—	8–14–1	17–5	8–14	11–11	14–8	13–9–1
Cleveland	13–9	14–8–1	—	16–6	10–12	13–9	15–7	12–10
Detroit	6–16	5–17	6–16	—	9–13	5–17–1	8–14	11–11–1
New York	14–8	14–8	12–10	13–9	—	13–9	14–8	15–7
Philadelphia	10–12	11–11	9–13	17–5–1	9–13	—	14–8	9–13
St. Louis	11–11	8–14	7–15	14–8	8–14	8–14	—	8–14–1
Washington	14–8	9–13–1	10–12	11–11–1	7–15	13–9	14–8–1	—

=== Notable transactions ===
- July 28, 1952: Darrell Johnson and Jim Rivera were traded by the Browns to the Chicago White Sox for Jay Porter and Ray Coleman.
- August 14, 1952: Jim Delsing, Ned Garver, Bud Black and Dave Madison were traded by the Browns to the Detroit Tigers for Dick Littlefield, Marlin Stuart, Don Lenhardt and Vic Wertz.

=== Roster ===
1952 St. Louis Browns
Roster
Pitchers: 30 Gene Bearden; 15 Tommy Byrne; 33 Bob Cain; 20,28 Cliff Fannin; 31 Ned Garver; 35 Earl Harrist; 24 Johnny Hetki; 24 Bobby Hogue; 17 Ken Holcombe; 34 Hal Hudson; 18 Dick Littlefield; 26 Dave Madison; 24 Bob Mahoney; 25 Stubby Overmire; 29 Satchel Paige; 12 Duane Pillette; 25 Lou Sleater; 26 Marlin Stuart; 23 Pete Taylor	Catchers: 11 Clint Courtney; 40 Darrell Johnson; 10 Les Moss; Infielders: 3 Hank Arft; 1 Joe DeMaestri; 27 Jim Dyck; 8,14 Gordon Goldsberry; 6 Mike Goliat; 9 Dick Kryhoski; 4 Marty Marion; 2 Fred Marsh; 6 Cass Michaels; 34 Willy Miranda; 28 Stan Rojek; 18 Roy Sievers; 8 Leo Thomas; 5 Bobby Young	Outfielders: 17 Ray Coleman; 21 Jake Crawford; 18 Jim Delsing; 23 Don Lenhardt; 19 Bob Nieman; 22 Jay Porter; 17 Earl Rapp; 7 Jim Rivera; 21 George Schmees; 20 Vic Wertz; 22 Tom Wright; 14 Al Zarilla	Manager: 42 Rogers Hornsby; 4 Marty Marion; Coaches: 4 Marty Marion; 47 Bill Norman; 44 Bob Scheffing

== Player stats ==
= Indicates team leader

=== Batting ===
==== Starters by position ====
Note: Pos = Position; G = Games played; AB = At bats; H = Hits; Avg. = Batting average; HR = Home runs; RBI = Runs batted in

Pos	Player	G	AB	H	Avg.	HR	RBI
C	Clint Courtney	119	413	118	.286	5	50
1B	Dick Kryhoski	111	342	83	.243	11	42
2B	Bobby Young	149	575	142	.247	4	39
SS	Joe DeMaestri	81	186	42	.226	1	18
3B	Jim Dyck	122	402	108	.269	15	64
OF	Jim Rivera	97	336	86	.256	4	30
OF	Bob Nieman	131	478	138	.289	18	74
OF	Jim Delsing	93	298	76	.255	1	34

==== Other batters ====
Note: G = Games played; AB = At bats; H = Hits; Avg. = Batting average; HR = Home runs; RBI = Runs batted in

Player	G	AB	H	Avg.	HR	RBI
Fred Marsh	87	247	69	.279	2	27
Gordon Goldsberry	86	227	52	.229	3	17
Marty Marion	67	186	46	.247	2	19
Cass Michaels	55	166	44	.265	3	25
Al Zarilla	48	130	31	.238	1	9
Vic Wertz	37	130	45	.346	6	19
Leo Thomas	41	124	29	.234	0	12
Les Moss	52	118	29	.246	3	12
Jay Porter	33	104	26	.250	0	7
Darrell Johnson	29	78	22	.282	0	9
Tom Wright	29	66	16	.242	1	6
George Schmees	34	61	8	.131	0	3
Earl Rapp	30	49	7	.143	0	4
Don Lenhardt	18	48	13	.271	1	5
Ray Coleman	20	46	9	.196	0	1
Roy Sievers	11	30	6	.200	0	5
Hank Arft	15	28	4	.143	0	4
Willy Miranda	7	11	1	.091	0	1
Jake Crawford	7	11	2	.182	0	0
Stan Rojek	9	7	1	.143	0	0
Mike Goliat	3	4	0	.000	0	0

=== Pitching ===
==== Starting pitchers ====
Note: G = Games pitched; IP = Innings pitched; W = Wins; L = Losses; ERA = Earned run average; SO = Strikeouts

Player	G	IP	W	L	ERA	SO
Duane Pillette	30	205.1	10	13	3.59	62
Tommy Byrne	29	176.0	9	14	4.68	91
Bob Cain	29	170.0	12	10	4.13	70
Ned Garver	21	148.2	7	10	3.69	60
Dick Littlefield	7	46.1	2	3	2.72	34

==== Other pitchers ====
Note: G = Games pitched; IP = Innings pitched; W = Wins; L = Losses; ERA = Earned run average; SO = Strikeouts

Player	G	IP	W	L	ERA	SO
Gene Bearden	34	150.2	7	8	4.30	45
Earl Harrist	36	116.2	2	8	4.01	49
Stubby Overmire	17	41.0	0	3	3.73	10
Marlin Stuart	12	26.0	1	2	4.15	13
Bobby Hogue	8	16.1	0	1	2.76	2
Cliff Fannin	10	16.1	0	2	12.67	6
Johnny Hetki	3	9.1	0	1	3.86	4
Lou Sleater	4	8.2	0	1	7.27	1

==== Relief pitchers ====
Note: G = Games pitched; W = Wins; L = Losses; SV = Saves; ERA = Earned run average; SO = Strikeouts

Player	G	W	L	SV	ERA	SO
Satchel Paige	46	12	10	10	3.07	91
Dave Madison	31	4	2	0	4.38	35
Ken Holcombe	12	0	2	0	3.86	7
Hal Hudson	3	0	0	0	12.71	0
Bob Mahoney	3	0	0	0	18.00	1
Pete Taylor	1	0	0	0	13.50	0

== Farm system ==
Level	Team	League	Manager
AAA	Toronto Maple Leafs	International League	Joe Becker and Burleigh Grimes
AA	San Antonio Missions	Texas League	Jo-Jo White
A	Scranton Miners	Eastern League	Zack Taylor
B	York White Roses	Interstate League	Jim Crandall
B	Anderson Rebels	Tri-State League	George Hausmann
C	Stockton Ports	California League	Harry Clements and Tony Freitas
C	Pine Bluff Judges	Cotton States League	Hillis Layne
C	Aberdeen Pheasants	Northern League	Bruce Ogrodowski
C	Pocatello Bannocks	Pioneer League	Ed Fernandes
D	Independence Browns	Kansas–Oklahoma–Missouri League	Fred Collins
D	Wellsville Rockets	PONY League	Gene Crumling and Rocco Sgro
D	Ada Herefords	Sooner State League	Bill Enos, Virl Loman and James England
