= 1952 Washington Senators season =

1952 Washington Senators
- League: American League
- Ballpark: Griffith Stadium
- City: Washington, D.C.
- Record: 78–76 (.506)
- League place: 5th
- Owners: Clark Griffith (majority owner)
- Managers: Bucky Harris
- Television: WTTG (Arch McDonald, Bob Wolff)
- Radio: WWDC (FM) (Arch McDonald, Bob Wolff)

The 1952 Washington Senators won 78 games, lost 76, and finished in fifth place in the American League. They were managed by Bucky Harris and played home games at Griffith Stadium.

== Regular season ==
=== Season standings ===
American League
Team	W	L	Pct.	GB	Home	Road
New York Yankees	95	59	.617	—	49‍–‍28	46‍–‍31
Cleveland Indians	93	61	.604	2	49‍–‍28	44‍–‍33
Chicago White Sox	81	73	.526	14	44‍–‍33	37‍–‍40
Philadelphia Athletics	79	75	.513	16	45‍–‍32	34‍–‍43
Washington Senators	78	76	.506	17	42‍–‍35	36‍–‍41
Boston Red Sox	76	78	.494	19	50‍–‍27	26‍–‍51
St. Louis Browns	64	90	.416	31	42‍–‍35	22‍–‍55
Detroit Tigers	50	104	.325	45	32‍–‍45	18‍–‍59

=== Record vs. opponents ===
1952 American League record Sources:
Team	BOS	CWS	CLE	DET	NYY	PHA	SLB	WSH
Boston	—	12–10	9–13	16–6	8–14	12–10	11–11	8–14
Chicago	10–12	—	8–14–1	17–5	8–14	11–11	14–8	13–9–1
Cleveland	13–9	14–8–1	—	16–6	10–12	13–9	15–7	12–10
Detroit	6–16	5–17	6–16	—	9–13	5–17–1	8–14	11–11–1
New York	14–8	14–8	12–10	13–9	—	13–9	14–8	15–7
Philadelphia	10–12	11–11	9–13	17–5–1	9–13	—	14–8	9–13
St. Louis	11–11	8–14	7–15	14–8	8–14	8–14	—	8–14–1
Washington	14–8	9–13–1	10–12	11–11–1	7–15	13–9	14–8–1	—

=== Roster ===
1952 Washington Senators
Roster
Pitchers: 30 Sandy Consuegra; 21 Tom Ferrick; 4 Mike Fornieles; 15 Harley Grossman; 33 Randy Gumpert; 17 Mickey Harris; 18 Joe Haynes; 20 Sid Hudson; 24 Don Johnson; 22 Connie Marrero; 20 Walt Masterson; 23 Julio Moreno; 12 Bobo Newsom; 19 Bob Porterfield; 5,33 Raúl Sánchez; 17 Spec Shea; 34 Lou Sleater; 34 Bunky Stewart	Catchers: 9 George Bradshaw; 11 Mickey Grasso; 9 Hal Keller; 10 Clyde Kluttz; Infielders: 4 Floyd Baker; 28 Mel Hoderlein; 7 Fred Marsh; 7 Cass Michaels; 35 Pete Runnels; 27 Jerry Snyder; 34 Fred Taylor; 4 Tom Upton; 3 Mickey Vernon; 1 Eddie Yost	Outfielders: 14 Jim Busby; 25 Frank Campos; 2 Gil Coan; 8 Jackie Jensen; 14 Sam Mele; 8 Irv Noren; 7 Earl Rapp; 15 Buck Varner; 26 Archie Wilson; 26 Ken Wood; Other batters: 5 Sherry Robertson	Manager: 50 Bucky Harris; Coaches: 54 Nick Altrock; 52 Joe Fitzgerald; 51 Clyde Milan; 53 George Myatt

== Player stats ==
= Indicates team leader

=== Batting ===
==== Starters by position ====
Note: Pos = Position; G = Games played; AB = At bats; H = Hits; Avg. = Batting average; HR = Home runs; RBI = Runs batted in

Pos	Player	G	AB	H	Avg.	HR	RBI
C	Mickey Grasso	115	361	78	.216	0	27
1B	Mickey Vernon	154	569	143	.251	10	80
2B	Floyd Baker	79	263	69	.262	0	33
SS	Pete Runnels	152	555	158	.285	1	64
3B	Eddie Yost	157	587	137	.233	12	49
OF	Jim Busby	129	512	125	.244	2	47
OF	Jackie Jensen	144	570	163	.286	10	80
OF	Gil Coan	107	332	68	.205	5	20

==== Other batters ====
Note: G = Games played; AB = At bats; H = Hits; Avg. = Batting average; HR = Home runs; RBI = Runs batted in

Player	G	AB	H	Avg.	HR	RBI
Ken Wood	61	210	50	.238	6	32
Mel Hoderlein	72	208	56	.269	0	17
Clyde Kluttz	58	144	33	.229	1	11
Frank Campos	53	112	29	.259	0	8
Archie Wilson	26	96	20	.208	0	14
Cass Michaels	22	86	20	.233	1	7
Earl Rapp	46	67	19	.284	0	9
Jerry Snyder	36	57	9	.158	0	2
Irv Noren	12	49	12	.245	0	2
Sam Mele	9	28	12	.429	2	10
Fred Marsh	9	24	1	.042	0	1
George Bradshaw	10	23	5	.217	0	6
Hal Keller	11	23	4	.174	0	0
Fred Taylor	10	19	5	.263	0	4
Tom Upton	5	5	0	.000	0	0
Buck Varner	2	4	0	.000	0	0
Sherry Robertson	1	0	0	----	0	0

=== Pitching ===
==== Starting pitchers ====
Note: G = Games pitched; IP = Innings pitched; W = Wins; L = Losses; ERA = Earned run average; SO = Strikeouts

Player	G	IP	W	L	ERA	SO
Bob Porterfield	31	231.1	13	14	2.72	80
Connie Marrero	22	184.1	11	8	2.88	77
Spec Shea	22	169.0	11	7	2.93	65
Walt Masterson	24	160.2	9	8	3.70	89
Julio Moreno	26	147.1	9	9	3.97	62
Sid Hudson	7	62.2	3	4	2.73	24

==== Other pitchers ====
Note: G = Games pitched; IP = Innings pitched; W = Wins; L = Losses; ERA = Earned run average; SO = Strikeouts

Player	G	IP	W	L	ERA	SO
Randy Gumpert	20	104.0	4	9	4.24	29
Don Johnson	29	69.0	0	5	4.43	37
Lou Sleater	14	57.0	4	2	3.63	22
Mike Fornieles	4	26.1	2	2	1.37	12
Raúl Sánchez	3	12.2	1	1	3.55	6

==== Relief pitchers ====
Note: G = Games pitched; W = Wins; L = Losses; SV = Saves; ERA = Earned run average; SO = Strikeouts

Player	G	W	L	SV	ERA	SO
Sandy Consuegra	30	6	0	5	3.05	19
Tom Ferrick	27	4	3	1	3.02	28
Joe Haynes	22	0	3	3	4.50	18
Bobo Newsom	10	1	1	2	4.97	5
Mickey Harris	1	0	0	0	9.00	0
Bunky Stewart	1	0	0	0	18.00	1
Harley Grossman	1	0	0	0	54.00	0

== Farm system ==
Level	Team	League	Manager
AA	Chattanooga Lookouts	Southern Association	Cal Ermer
B	Danville Leafs	Carolina League	Morrie Aderholt
B	Havana Cubanos	Florida International League	Mike Guerra
B	Charlotte Hornets	Tri-State League	Ivan Kuester
C	Drummondville Cubs	Provincial League	Herb Crompton
D	Roanoke Rapids Jays	Coastal Plain League	Pete Appleton
D	Orlando Senators	Florida State League	Ed Levy
D	Fulton Lookouts	KITTY League	Sam Lamitina

LEAGUE CHAMPIONS: Charlotte
