= 1952 Detroit Tigers season =

Major League Baseball season

1952 Detroit Tigers
- League: American League
- Ballpark: Briggs Stadium
- City: Detroit
- Record: 50–104 (.325)
- League place: 8th
- Owners: Walter Briggs, Sr., Walter Briggs, Jr.
- General managers: Charlie Gehringer
- Managers: Red Rolfe, Fred Hutchinson
- Television: WWJ (Van Patrick)
- Radio: WJBK/WXYZ (Van Patrick)

The 1952 Detroit Tigers had a record of 50–104 (.325) — the worst record in Tigers' history until the 2003 Tigers finished 43–119 (.265). Virgil Trucks became the third pitcher in major league history to throw two no-hitters in one season.

== Regular season ==
As of 2025, the 1952 Tigers winning percentage ranks third-worst in the Tigers' history, as shown in this chart. The club was managed by Red Rolfe (April 15 through July 4), who compiled a win–loss record of 23–49 (.319), then by pitcher-manager Fred Hutchinson, who had a record of 27–55 (.329) from July 5 through closing day, September 28.

Worst Seasons in Detroit Tigers History
Rank	Year	Wins	Losses	Win %
1	2003	43	119	.265
2	2019	47	114	.292
3	1952	50	104	.325
4	1996	53	109	.327
5	2002	55	106	.342
6	1975	57	102	.358

=== Season standings ===
American League
Team	W	L	Pct.	GB	Home	Road
New York Yankees	95	59	.617	—	49‍–‍28	46‍–‍31
Cleveland Indians	93	61	.604	2	49‍–‍28	44‍–‍33
Chicago White Sox	81	73	.526	14	44‍–‍33	37‍–‍40
Philadelphia Athletics	79	75	.513	16	45‍–‍32	34‍–‍43
Washington Senators	78	76	.506	17	42‍–‍35	36‍–‍41
Boston Red Sox	76	78	.494	19	50‍–‍27	26‍–‍51
St. Louis Browns	64	90	.416	31	42‍–‍35	22‍–‍55
Detroit Tigers	50	104	.325	45	32‍–‍45	18‍–‍59

=== Record vs. opponents ===
1952 American League record Sources:
Team	BOS	CWS	CLE	DET	NYY	PHA	SLB	WSH
Boston	—	12–10	9–13	16–6	8–14	12–10	11–11	8–14
Chicago	10–12	—	8–14–1	17–5	8–14	11–11	14–8	13–9–1
Cleveland	13–9	14–8–1	—	16–6	10–12	13–9	15–7	12–10
Detroit	6–16	5–17	6–16	—	9–13	5–17–1	8–14	11–11–1
New York	14–8	14–8	12–10	13–9	—	13–9	14–8	15–7
Philadelphia	10–12	11–11	9–13	17–5–1	9–13	—	14–8	9–13
St. Louis	11–11	8–14	7–15	14–8	8–14	8–14	—	8–14–1
Washington	14–8	9–13–1	10–12	11–11–1	7–15	13–9	14–8–1	—

=== Notable transactions ===
- June 3, 1952: Dizzy Trout, George Kell, Johnny Lipon, and Hoot Evers were traded by the Tigers to the Boston Red Sox for Walt Dropo, Fred Hatfield, Don Lenhardt, Johnny Pesky, and Bill Wight.
- August 14, 1952: Dick Littlefield, Marlin Stuart, Don Lenhardt and Vic Wertz were traded by the Tigers to the St. Louis Browns for Jim Delsing, Ned Garver, Bud Black and Dave Madison.

=== Roster ===
1952 Detroit Tigers
Roster
Pitchers: 37,19 Bud Black; 31 Ned Garver; 34 Ted Gray; 44 Billy Hoeft; 21 Art Houtteman; 29 Fred Hutchinson; 26 Ken Johnson; 38 Dick Littlefield; 14 Dave Madison; 37 Dick Marlowe; 31 Wayne McLeland; 16 Hal Newhouser; 24 Marlin Stuart; 11 Dizzy Trout; 22 Virgil Trucks; 25 Hal White; 18 Bill Wight	Catchers: 15 Matt Batts; 1 Joe Ginsberg; 9 Bob Swift; Infielders: 8 Neil Berry; 11 Walt Dropo; 28 Al Federoff; 2 Fred Hatfield; 7 George Kell; 17 Don Kolloway; 26 Harvey Kuenn; 2 Johnny Lipon; 7 Johnny Pesky; 4 Jerry Priddy; 30 Ben Taylor	Outfielders: 24 Jim Delsing; 3 Johnny Groth; 32 Johnny Hopp; 14 Don Lenhardt; 32 George Lerchen; 30 Don Lund; 5 Cliff Mapes; 6 Pat Mullin; 12 Steve Souchock; 18 Russ Sullivan; 19 Bill Tuttle; 20 Vic Wertz; Other batters: 14 Hoot Evers; 19 Alex Garbowski; 15 Carl Linhart	Manager: 29 Fred Hutchinson; 10 Red Rolfe; Coaches: 28 Dick Bartell; 36 Rick Ferrell; 33 Ted Lyons

== Player stats ==
=== Batting ===
==== Starters by position ====
Note: Pos = Position; G = Games played; AB = At bats; H = Hits; Avg. = Batting average; HR = Home runs; RBI = Runs batted in

Pos	Player	G	AB	H	Avg.	HR	RBI
C	Joe Ginsberg	113	307	68	.221	6	36
1B	Walt Dropo	115	459	128	.279	23	70
2B	Jerry Priddy	75	279	79	.283	4	20
3B	Fred Hatfield	112	441	104	.236	2	25
SS	Neil Berry	73	189	43	.228	0	13
OF	Johnny Groth	141	524	149	.284	4	51
OF	Vic Wertz	85	285	70	.246	17	51
OF	Pat Mullin	97	255	64	.251	7	35

==== Other batters ====
Note: G = Games played; AB = At bats; H = Hits; Avg. = Batting average; HR = Home runs; RBI = Runs batted in

Player	G	AB	H	Avg.	HR	RBI
Steve Souchock	92	265	66	.249	13	45
Al Federoff	74	231	56	.242	0	14
Cliff Mapes	86	193	26	.197	9	23
Johnny Pesky	69	177	45	.254	1	9
Matt Batts	56	173	41	.237	3	13
Don Kolloway	65	173	42	.243	2	21
George Kell	39	152	45	.296	1	17
Don Lenhardt	45	144	27	.188	3	13
Johnny Lipon	39	136	30	.221	0	12
Jim Delsing	33	113	31	.274	3	15
Harvey Kuenn	19	80	26	.325	0	8
Bob Swift	28	58	8	.138	0	4
Russ Sullivan	15	52	17	.327	3	5
Johnny Hopp	42	46	10	.217	0	3
George Lerchen	14	32	5	.156	1	3
Bill Tuttle	7	25	6	.240	0	2
Don Lund	8	23	7	.304	0	1
Ben Taylor	7	18	3	.167	0	0
Carl Linhart	3	2	0	.000	0	0
Hoot Evers	1	1	1	1.000	0	0
Alex Garbowski	2	0	0	----	0	0

Note: pitchers' batting statistics not included

=== Pitching ===
==== Starting pitchers ====
Note: G = Games pitched; IP = Innings pitched; W = Wins; L = Losses; ERA = Earned run average; SO = Strikeouts

Player	G	IP	W	L	ERA	SO
Ted Gray	35	224.0	12	17	4.14	138
Art Houtteman	35	221.0	8	20	4.36	109
Virgil Trucks	35	197.0	5	19	3.97	129
Hal Newhouser	25	154.0	9	9	3.74	57
Bill Wight	23	143.2	5	9	3.88	57
Ned Garver	1	9.0	1	0	2.00	3
Bud Black	2	8.0	0	1	10.13	0

==== Other pitchers ====
Note: G = Games pitched; IP = Innings pitched; W = Wins; L = Losses; ERA = Earned run average; SO = Strikeouts

Player	G	IP	W	L	ERA	SO
Billy Hoeft	34	125.0	2	7	4.32	65
Marlin Stuart	30	91.1	3	2	4.93	32
Dizzy Trout	10	27.0	1	5	5.33	20
Ken Johnson	9	11.1	0	0	6.35	10
Dick Marlowe	4	11.0	0	2	7.36	3

==== Relief pitchers ====
Note: G = Games pitched; W = Wins; L = Losses; SV = Saves; ERA = Earned run average; SO = Strikeouts

Player	G	W	L	SV	ERA	SO
Hal White	41	1	8	5	3.69	18
Dick Littlefield	28	0	3	1	4.34	32
Fred Hutchinson	12	2	1	0	3.38	12
Dave Madison	10	1	1	0	7.80	7
Wayne McLeland	4	0	0	0	10.13	0

== Awards and accomplishments ==
=== League top five finishers ===
- Art Houtteman: AL leader in losses (20)
- Virgil Trucks: #2 in AL in losses (19)
- Ted Gray: #3 in AL in losses (17)

=== Players ranking among top 100 of all time at position ===
The following members of the 1952 Detroit Tigers are among the Top 100 of all time at their positions, as ranked by The New Bill James Historical Baseball Abstract in 2001:

- Jerry Priddy: 73rd best second baseman of all time
- Johnny Pesky: 20th best shortstop of all time (played 69 games for 1952 Tigers)
- George Kell: 30th best third baseman of all time (played only 39 games for 1952 Tigers)
- Vic Wertz: 61st best right fielder of all time
- Harvey Kuenn: 62nd best right fielder of all time (played only 19 games for 1952 Tigers)
- Hal Newhouser: 36th best pitcher of all time
- Virgil Trucks: 61st best pitcher of all time

=== Walt Dropo's consecutive hits streak ===
- Over a three-game stretch from July 14 to July 15, Walt Dropo had hits in 12 consecutive plate appearances to tie a major league record also held by Johnny Kling (1902).

== Farm system ==
Level	Team	League	Manager
AAA	Buffalo Bisons	International League	Jack Tighe and Schoolboy Rowe
AA	Little Rock Travelers	Southern Association	Willis Hudlin
A	Williamsport Tigers	Eastern League	Paul Campbell
B	Durham Bulls	Carolina League	Ace Parker
B	Davenport Tigers	Illinois–Indiana–Iowa League	Marv Olson
D	Kinston Eagles	Coastal Plain League	Wayne Blackburn
D	Jamestown Falcons	PONY League	Tony Lupien
D	Wausau Lumberjacks	Wisconsin State League	Mike Tresh

LEAGUE CHAMPIONS: Jamestown
