= 1952 Chicago White Sox season =

1952 Chicago White Sox
- League: American League
- Ballpark: Comiskey Park
- City: Chicago
- Owners: Grace Comiskey
- General managers: Frank Lane
- Managers: Paul Richards
- Television: WGN-TV (Jack Brickhouse, Harry Creighton)
- Radio: WCFL (Bob Elson, Dick Bingham)

The 1952 Chicago White Sox season was the team's 52nd season in the major leagues, and its 53rd season overall. They finished with a record of 81–73, good enough for third place in the American League, 14 games behind the first place New York Yankees.

== Offseason ==
- October 10, 1951: Marv Rotblatt, Jerry Dahlke, Bill Fischer, and Dick Duffy (minors) were traded by the White Sox to the Seattle Rainiers for Marv Grissom and Hal Brown.
- November 27, 1951: Joe DeMaestri, Gordon Goldsberry, Dick Littlefield, Gus Niarhos, and Jim Rivera were traded by the White Sox to the St. Louis Browns for Al Widmar, Sherm Lollar, and Tom Upton.

== Regular season ==
=== Season standings ===
American League
Team	W	L	Pct.	GB	Home	Road
New York Yankees	95	59	.617	—	49‍–‍28	46‍–‍31
Cleveland Indians	93	61	.604	2	49‍–‍28	44‍–‍33
Chicago White Sox	81	73	.526	14	44‍–‍33	37‍–‍40
Philadelphia Athletics	79	75	.513	16	45‍–‍32	34‍–‍43
Washington Senators	78	76	.506	17	42‍–‍35	36‍–‍41
Boston Red Sox	76	78	.494	19	50‍–‍27	26‍–‍51
St. Louis Browns	64	90	.416	31	42‍–‍35	22‍–‍55
Detroit Tigers	50	104	.325	45	32‍–‍45	18‍–‍59

=== Record vs. opponents ===
1952 American League record Sources:
Team	BOS	CWS	CLE	DET	NYY	PHA	SLB	WSH
Boston	—	12–10	9–13	16–6	8–14	12–10	11–11	8–14
Chicago	10–12	—	8–14–1	17–5	8–14	11–11	14–8	13–9–1
Cleveland	13–9	14–8–1	—	16–6	10–12	13–9	15–7	12–10
Detroit	6–16	5–17	6–16	—	9–13	5–17–1	8–14	11–11–1
New York	14–8	14–8	12–10	13–9	—	13–9	14–8	15–7
Philadelphia	10–12	11–11	9–13	17–5–1	9–13	—	14–8	9–13
St. Louis	11–11	8–14	7–15	14–8	8–14	8–14	—	8–14–1
Washington	14–8	9–13–1	10–12	11–11–1	7–15	13–9	14–8–1	—

=== Opening Day lineup ===
- Chico Carrasquel, SS
- Nellie Fox, 2B
- Minnie Miñoso, LF
- Eddie Robinson, 1B
- Ray Coleman, RF
- Sherm Lollar, C
- Jim Busby, CF
- Héctor Rodríguez, 3B
- Billy Pierce, P

=== Notable transactions ===
- July 28, 1952: Jay Porter and Ray Coleman were traded by the White Sox to the St. Louis Browns for Darrell Johnson and Jim Rivera.

=== Roster ===
1952 Chicago White Sox
Roster
Pitchers: 59 Luis Aloma; 27 Hal Brown; 29 Joe Dobson; 12 Harry Dorish; 16 Marv Grissom; 34 Ken Holcombe; 24 Hal Hudson; 48 Howie Judson; 37 Bill Kennedy; 23 Lou Kretlow; 19 Billy Pierce; 35 Saul Rogovin; 18 Chuck Stobbs; 47 Al Widmar	Catchers: 47 Darrell Johnson; 45 Sherm Lollar; 38 Phil Masi; 15 Bud Sheely; -- Red Wilson; Infielders: 17 Chico Carrasquel; 8 Sam Dente; 3 Sammy Esposito; 26 Nellie Fox; 6 Rocky Krsnich; 34 Ken Landenberger; 49 Willy Miranda; 46 Eddie Robinson; 36 Héctor Rodríguez; 3 Leo Thomas	Outfielders: 3 Jim Busby; 39 Ray Coleman; 38 Hank Edwards; 14 Sam Mele; 9 Minnie Miñoso; 39 Jim Rivera; 7 Bud Stewart; 5 George Wilson; 5 Tom Wright; 2 Al Zarilla; Other batters: 56 Don Nicholas	Manager: 22 Paul Richards; Coaches: 33 Jimmy Adair; 44 Ray Berres; 28 Doc Cramer; 40 Luman Harris

== Player stats ==
=== Batting ===
Note: G = Games played; AB = At bats; R = Runs scored; H = Hits; 2B = Doubles; 3B = Triples; HR = Home runs; RBI = Runs batted in; BB = Base on balls; SO = Strikeouts; AVG = Batting average; SB = Stolen bases

Player	G	AB	R	H	2B	3B	HR	RBI	BB	SO	AVG	SB
Jim Busby, CF	16	39	5	5	0	0	0	0	2	7	.128	0
Chico Carrasquel, SS	100	359	69	89	7	4	1	42	33	27	.248	2
Ray Coleman, OF	85	195	19	42	7	1	2	14	13	17	.215	0
Sam Dente, SS, 3B, 2B, LF	62	145	12	32	0	1	0	11	5	8	.221	0
Hank Edwards, LF	8	18	2	6	0	0	0	1	0	2	.333	0
Sammy Esposito, SS	1	4	0	1	0	0	0	0	0	2	.250	0
Nellie Fox, 2B	152	648	76	192	25	10	0	39	34	14	.296	5
Darrell Johnson, C	22	37	3	4	0	0	0	1	5	9	.108	1
Rocky Krsnich, 3B	40	91	11	21	7	2	1	15	12	9	.231	0
Ken Landenberger, 1B	2	5	0	1	0	0	0	0	0	2	.200	0
Sherm Lollar, C	132	375	35	90	15	0	13	50	54	34	.240	1
Phil Masi, C	30	63	9	16	1	1	0	7	10	10	.254	0
Sam Mele, RF	123	423	46	105	18	2	14	59	48	40	.248	1
Minnie Miñoso, LF, CF, RF, 3B	147	569	96	160	24	9	13	61	71	46	.281	22
Willy Miranda, SS	70	150	14	33	4	1	0	7	13	14	.220	1
Don Nicholas, PH	3	2	0	0	0	0	0	0	0	0	.000	0
Jim Rivera, CF	53	201	27	50	7	3	3	18	21	27	.249	13
Eddie Robinson, 1B	155	594	79	176	33	1	22	104	70	49	.296	2
Héctor Rodríguez, 3B	124	407	55	108	14	0	1	40	47	22	.265	7
Bud Sheely, C	36	75	1	18	2	0	0	3	12	7	.240	0
Bud Stewart, LF, RF	92	225	23	60	10	0	5	30	28	17	.267	3
Leo Thomas, 3B	19	24	1	4	0	0	0	6	6	4	.167	0
George Wilson, RF	8	9	0	1	0	0	0	1	1	2	.111	0
Red Wilson, C	2	3	0	0	0	0	0	0	0	1	.000	0
Tom Wright, RF, LF	77	132	14	33	5	3	2	25	12	21	.250	0
Al Zarilla, RF, LF	39	99	14	23	4	1	2	7	14	6	.232	1

Player	G	AB	R	H	2B	3B	HR	RBI	BB	SO	AVG	SB
Luis Aloma, P	25	7	0	0	0	0	0	0	0	2	.000	0
Hal Brown, P	51	19	6	3	1	0	1	3	1	8	.158	0
Joe Dobson, P	29	63	3	12	0	0	0	3	4	20	.190	0
Fritz Dorish, P	39	22	2	2	1	0	0	0	1	4	.091	0
Marv Grissom, P	28	53	1	8	4	0	0	4	1	19	.151	0
Ken Holcombe, P	7	10	0	0	0	0	0	0	0	4	.000	0
Howie Judson, P	21	4	0	0	0	0	0	0	0	2	.000	0
Bill Kennedy, P	47	13	0	3	0	0	0	0	0	5	.231	0
Lou Kretlow, P	19	20	1	1	1	0	0	0	3	14	.050	0
Billy Pierce, P	35	91	11	17	1	0	0	3	6	20	.187	0
Saul Rogovin, P	33	84	6	17	3	0	1	7	4	18	.202	1
Chuck Stobbs, P	38	38	1	3	0	0	0	3	6	11	.079	0
Team totals	156	5316	610	1337	199	38	80	560	541	519	.252	61

=== Pitching ===
Note: W = Wins; L = Losses; ERA = Earned run average; G = Games pitched; GS = Games started; SV = Saves; IP = Innings pitched; H = Hits allowed; R = Runs allowed; ER = Earned runs allowed; HR = Home runs allowed; BB = Walks allowed; K = Strikeouts

Player	W	L	ERA	G	GS	SV	IP	H	R	ER	HR	BB	K
Luis Aloma	3	1	4.28	25	0	6	40.0	42	20	19	5	11	18
Hal Brown	2	3	4.23	24	8	0	72.1	82	39	34	8	21	31
Joe Dobson	14	10	2.51	29	25	1	200.2	164	66	56	11	60	101
Fritz Dorish	8	4	2.47	39	1	11	91.0	66	28	25	4	42	47
Marv Grissom	12	10	3.74	28	24	0	166.0	156	79	69	6	79	97
Ken Holcombe	0	5	6.17	7	7	0	35.0	38	24	24	3	18	12
Hal Hudson	0	0	2.25	2	0	0	4.0	7	2	1	0	1	4
Howie Judson	0	1	4.24	21	0	1	34.0	30	17	16	4	22	15
Bill Kennedy	2	2	2.80	47	1	5	70.2	54	27	22	4	38	46
Lou Kretlow	4	4	2.96	19	11	1	79.0	52	31	26	5	56	63
Billy Pierce	15	12	2.57	33	32	1	255.1	214	76	73	12	79	144
Saul Rogovin	14	9	3.85	33	30	1	231.2	224	104	99	14	79	121
Chuck Stobbs	7	12	3.13	38	17	1	135.0	118	54	47	9	72	73
Al Widmar	0	0	4.50	1	0	0	2.0	4	1	1	1	0	2
Team totals	81	73	3.25	156	156	28	1416.2	1251	568	512	86	578	774

== Farm system ==
Level	Team	League	Manager
AA	Memphis Chicks	Southern Association	Luke Appling
A	Colorado Springs Sky Sox	Western League	Don Gutteridge
B	Waterloo White Hawks	Illinois–Indiana–Iowa League	Skeeter Webb
B	Gastonia Rockets	Tri-State League	Hal VanPelt
C	Superior Blues	Northern League	Wally Millies
D	Madisonville Miners	KITTY League	Franklin Robinson
D	Wisconsin Rapids White Sox	Wisconsin State League	Ira Hutchinson

LEAGUE CHAMPIONS: Memphis, Superior, Madisonville
