= 1952 Boston Red Sox season =

Major League Baseball season

1952 Boston Red Sox
- League: American League
- Ballpark: Fenway Park
- City: Boston, Massachusetts
- Record: 76–78 (.494)
- League place: 6th
- Owners: Tom Yawkey
- President: Tom Yawkey
- General managers: Joe Cronin
- Managers: Lou Boudreau
- Television: WBZ-TV, Ch. 4, and WNAC-TV, Ch. 7
- Radio: WHDH-AM 850 (Curt Gowdy, Bob DeLaney, Tom Hussey)
- Stats: ESPN.com; Baseball Reference

The 1952 Boston Red Sox season was the 52nd season in the franchise's Major League Baseball history. The Red Sox finished sixth in the American League (AL) with a record of 76 wins and 78 losses, 19 games behind the New York Yankees, who went on to win the 1952 World Series.

== Spring Training ==
Boston Win	Boston Loss	Tie Game

1952 Boston Red Sox Spring Training Log
March: 9─10

#	Date	Opponent	Score	Record	Source
1	March 8	Vs. Reds	0─5	1─0	
2	March 9	Vs. Phillies	13─4	1─1	
3	March 10	@ Yankees	4─7	1─2	
4	March 11	Vs. Yankees	7─6	1─3	
5	March 12	Vs. Cardinals	7─6	1─4	
6	March 13	Vs. Senators	4─1	1─5	
7	March 14	Vs. Tigers	7─5	1─6	
8	March 15	Vs. Braves	12─2	1─7	
9	March 16	@ Reds	10─6	2─7	
10	March 17	@ Braves	1─2	2─8	
11	March 19	@ Cardinals	3─2	3─8	
12	March 20	@ Senators	14─8	4─8	
12	March 21	@ Athletics	5─3	5─8	
13	March 22	@ Dodgers	5─2	6─8	
14	March 23	@ Dodgers	2─14	6─9	
15	March 27	Vs. Reds	9─1	6─10	
16	March 28	@ Phillies	9─7	7─10	
17	March 29	@ Yankees	8─5	8─10	
18	March 30	@ Barons	5─2	9─10	

April: 6─2─1

#	Date	Opponent	Score	Record	Source
19	April 1	@ Sports	4─2	10─10	
20	April 2	@ Buffaloes	13─2	11─10	
21	April 3	@ Eagles	1─1	11─10─1	
22	April 4	@ Cats	9─3	12─10─1	
23	April 5	@ Oilers	5─3	13─10─1	
24	April 6	@ Indians	8─4	14─10─1	
25	April 7	@ Athletics	6─12	14─11─1	
26	April 8	Vs. Athletics	4─3	14─12─1	
27	April 9	@ Cubs	6─1	15─12─1	

The Red Sox also faced the Braves as a Boston-based team for the final time. At Braves Field on April 10 the Braves beat the Red Sox by a score of 5─4. At Fenway Park on April 12 the Red Sox beat the Braves by a score of 12─7.

== Regular season ==
=== Season standings ===
American League
Team	W	L	Pct.	GB	Home	Road
New York Yankees	95	59	.617	—	49‍–‍28	46‍–‍31
Cleveland Indians	93	61	.604	2	49‍–‍28	44‍–‍33
Chicago White Sox	81	73	.526	14	44‍–‍33	37‍–‍40
Philadelphia Athletics	79	75	.513	16	45‍–‍32	34‍–‍43
Washington Senators	78	76	.506	17	42‍–‍35	36‍–‍41
Boston Red Sox	76	78	.494	19	50‍–‍27	26‍–‍51
St. Louis Browns	64	90	.416	31	42‍–‍35	22‍–‍55
Detroit Tigers	50	104	.325	45	32‍–‍45	18‍–‍59

=== Record vs. opponents ===
1952 American League record Sources:
Team	BOS	CWS	CLE	DET	NYY	PHA	SLB	WSH
Boston	—	12–10	9–13	16–6	8–14	12–10	11–11	8–14
Chicago	10–12	—	8–14–1	17–5	8–14	11–11	14–8	13–9–1
Cleveland	13–9	14–8–1	—	16–6	10–12	13–9	15–7	12–10
Detroit	6–16	5–17	6–16	—	9–13	5–17–1	8–14	11–11–1
New York	14–8	14–8	12–10	13–9	—	13–9	14–8	15–7
Philadelphia	10–12	11–11	9–13	17–5–1	9–13	—	14–8	9–13
St. Louis	11–11	8–14	7–15	14–8	8–14	8–14	—	8–14–1
Washington	14–8	9–13–1	10–12	11–11–1	7–15	13–9	14–8–1	—

=== Opening Day lineup ===
7	Dom DiMaggio	CF
6	Johnny Pesky	3B
9	Ted Williams	LF
3	Walt Dropo	1B
37	Faye Throneberry	RF
2	Jimmy Piersall	SS
17	Mel Parnell	P
12	Ted Lepcio	2B
11	Gus Niarhos	C

=== Notable transactions ===
- June 3, 1952: Walt Dropo, Fred Hatfield, Don Lenhardt, Johnny Pesky, and Bill Wight were traded by the Red Sox to the Detroit Tigers for Dizzy Trout, George Kell, Johnny Lipon, and Hoot Evers.

=== Roster ===
1952 Boston Red Sox
Roster
Pitchers: 25 James Atkins; 27 Al Benton; 26 Ralph Brickner; 24 Dick Brodowski; 29 Ike Delock; 28 Hersh Freeman; 24 Randy Gumpert; 26 Bill Henry; 20 Sid Hudson; 16 Ellis Kinder; 20 Walt Masterson; 19 Mickey McDermott; 21 Willard Nixon; 17 Mel Parnell; 18 Ray Scarborough; 23 Harry Taylor; 25 Dizzy Trout; 15 Bill Wight	Catchers: 11 Gus Niarhos; 34 Len Okrie; 22 Sammy White; 33 Del Wilber; Infielders: 8 Hal Bevan; 18 Milt Bolling; 4 Lou Boudreau; 3 Walt Dropo; 14 Dick Gernert; 10 Billy Goodman; 1 Fred Hatfield; 1 George Kell; 12 Ted Lepcio; 6 Johnny Lipon; 37 Charlie Maxwell; 6 Johnny Pesky; 2 Jimmy Piersall; 5 Vern Stephens	Outfielders: 7 Dom DiMaggio; 31 Hoot Evers; 37 Paul Lehner; 31 Don Lenhardt; 37 George Schmees; 38 Gene Stephens; 2 Faye Throneberry; 30 Clyde Vollmer; 9 Ted Williams; 32 Archie Wilson; 33 Ken Wood; 32 Al Zarilla	Manager: 4 Lou Boudreau; Coaches: 41 Earle Combs (First base); 40 Bill McKechnie (Pitching); 42 Ski Melillo (Third base); 45 Paul Schreiber (Hitting); 43 George Susce (Bullpen)

== Player stats ==
=== Batting ===
==== Starters by position ====
Note: Pos = Position; G = Games played; AB = At bats; H = Hits; Avg. = Batting average; HR = Home runs; RBI = Runs batted in

Pos	Player	G	AB	H	Avg.	HR	RBI
C	Sammy White	115	381	107	.281	10	49
1B	Dick Gernert	102	367	89	.243	19	67
2B	Billy Goodman	138	513	157	.306	4	56
SS	Johnny Lipon	79	234	48	.205	0	18
3B	George Kell	75	276	88	.319	6	40
OF	Faye Throneberry	98	310	80	.258	5	23
OF	Hoot Evers	106	401	105	.262	14	59
OF	Dom DiMaggio	128	486	143	.294	6	33

==== Other batters ====
Note: G = Games played; AB = At bats; H = Hits; Avg. = Batting average; HR = Home runs; RBI = Runs batted in

Player	G	AB	H	Avg.	HR	RBI
Vern Stephens	92	295	75	.254	7	44
Ted Lepcio	84	274	72	.263	5	26
Clyde Vollmer	90	250	66	.264	11	50
Jim Piersall	56	161	43	.267	1	16
Del Wilber	47	135	36	.267	3	23
Walt Dropo	37	132	35	.265	6	27
Don Lenhardt	30	105	31	.295	7	24
Johnny Pesky	25	67	10	.149	0	2
George Schmees	42	64	13	.203	0	3
Al Zarilla	21	60	11	.183	2	8
Gus Niarhos	29	58	6	.103	0	4
Gene Stephens	21	53	12	.226	0	5
Archie Wilson	18	38	10	.263	0	2
Milt Bolling	11	36	8	.222	1	3
Fred Hatfield	19	25	8	.320	1	3
Ken Wood	15	20	2	.100	0	0
Charlie Maxwell	8	15	1	.067	0	0
Ted Williams	6	10	4	.400	1	3
Paul Lehner	3	3	2	.667	0	2
Lou Boudreau	4	2	0	.000	0	2
Hal Bevan	1	1	0	.000	0	0
Len Okrie	1	1	0	.000	0	0

=== Pitching ===
==== Starting pitchers ====
Note: G = Games pitched; IP = Innings pitched; W = Wins; L = Losses; ERA = Earned run average; SO = Strikeouts

Player	G	IP	W	L	ERA	SO
Mel Parnell	33	214.0	12	12	3.62	107
Mickey McDermott	30	162.0	10	9	3.72	117
Sid Hudson	21	134.1	7	9	3.62	50

==== Other pitchers ====
Note: G = Games pitched; IP = Innings pitched; W = Wins; L = Losses; ERA = Earned run average; SO = Strikeouts

Player	G	IP	W	L	ERA	SO
Dizzy Trout	26	133.2	9	8	3.64	57
Dick Brodowski	20	114.2	5	5	4.40	42
Willard Nixon	23	103.2	5	4	4.86	50
Ellis Kinder	23	97.2	5	6	2.58	50
Ike Delock	39	95.0	4	9	4.26	46
Ray Scarborough	28	76.2	1	5	4.81	29
Bill Henry	13	76.2	5	4	3.87	23
Bill Wight	10	24.1	2	1	2.96	5
Hersh Freeman	4	13.2	1	0	3.29	5
James Atkins	3	10.1	0	1	3.48	2
Harry Taylor	2	10.0	1	0	1.80	1
Walt Masterson	5	9.1	1	1	11.57	3
George Schmees	2	6.0	0	0	3.00	2

==== Relief pitchers ====
Note: G = Games pitched; W = Wins; L = Losses; SV = Saves; ERA = Earned run average; SO = Strikeouts

Player	G	W	L	SV	ERA	SO
Al Benton	24	4	3	6	2.39	20
Ralph Brickner	14	3	1	1	2.18	9
Randy Gumpert	10	1	0	1	4.12	6

== Farm system ==
Level	Team	League	Manager
AAA	Louisville Colonels	American Association	Pinky Higgins
AA	Birmingham Barons	Southern Association	Al Vincent and Red Mathis
A	Albany Senators	Eastern League	Jack Burns
B	Roanoke Ro-Sox	Piedmont League	Owen Scheetz
C	San Jose Red Sox	California League	Red Marion
D	High Point-Thomasville Hi-Toms	North Carolina State League	Jim Gruzdis
