= Lou Sleater =

American baseball player (1926–2013)

- Pitcher
- Born: September 8, 1926; St. Louis, Missouri, U.S.
- Died: March 25, 2013 (aged 86); Timonium, Maryland, U.S.
- Batted: Left Threw: Left

MLB debut
- April 25, 1950, for the St. Louis Browns

Last MLB appearance
- September 28, 1958, for the Baltimore Orioles

MLB statistics
- Win–loss record: 12–18
- Earned run average: 4.70
- Strikeouts: 152
- Stats at Baseball Reference

Teams
- St. Louis Browns (1950–1952); Washington Senators (1952); Kansas City Athletics (1955); Milwaukee Braves (1956); Detroit Tigers (1957–1958); Baltimore Orioles (1958)

Louis Mortimer Sleater (September 8, 1926 – March 25, 2013) was an American left-handed Major League Baseball pitcher who played from 1950 to 1952 and from 1955 to 1958 for the St. Louis Browns, Washington Senators, Kansas City Athletics, Milwaukee Braves, Detroit Tigers and Baltimore Orioles. He stood 5 feet 10 inches (1.78 m) tall and weighed 185 pounds (84 kg). He attended the University of Maryland.

A knuckleball specialist, Sleater was signed as an amateur free agent by the Boston Braves in 1946. Before the 1947 season, the Braves released him and he was signed by the Chicago Cubs. Before the 1949 season, the New York Giants purchased him from the Cubs. On April 1, 1950, the Browns selected him off waivers from the Giants. Even before reaching the big leagues, Sleater was a well-traveled player.

Sleater made his big league debut with the Browns on April 25, 1950, at the age of 23. In his first game, he pitched one inning, striking out a batter and allowing no hits, no walks, and no runs. That would be his only major league game in 1950.

Pitching for the 52–102 Browns in 1951, Sleater went 1–9 with a 5.11 ERA. In 81 innings, he walked 53 batters and struck out only 33, while allowing 88 hits. His five hit batsmen were ninth most in the league. On July 31 of that year, he was either purchased by the New York Yankees or traded to them. One source lists him as being purchased, while another source says he was traded with Bobby Hogue, Kermit Wahl and Tom Upton for Cliff Mapes. Either way, he never pitched for the Yankees, as he was returned to the Browns on September 16.

Sleater began the 1952 season with the Browns, but lasted only four games, going 0–1 with a 7.27 ERA. On May 12, he was traded with Fred Marsh to the Senators for Cass Michaels. He finished the season with the Senators, going 4–2 with a 3.63 ERA in 57 innings. Overall, Sleater went 4–3 with a 4.11 ERA in 1952. 1952 is notable for Sleater because he halted Walt Dropo's big league record streak of reaching base via hit in 12 straight at-bats that season (he had allowed his 12th hit earlier in the game).

Sleater did not play in the big leagues from 1953 to 1954. In May 1954, he was purchased by the Toronto Maple Leafs of the International League. He was purchased by the Yankees from Toronto on October 16, 1954. Once again, he would be in the Yankees organization, but would not play for the major league team, because he was purchased by the Athletics from the Yankees on April 28, 1955. He found his way back to the major leagues in 1955, going 1–1 with a 7.71 ERA in 16 games (one start). In 25 2/3 innings, he walked 21 batters and struck out only 11.

On November 27, 1955, Sleater was drafted by the Braves from the Athletics in the Rule 5 draft. He played 25 games for the Braves in 1956, 2–2 with a 3.15 ERA in 45 2/3 innings of work. He was released by the Braves on April 11, 1957. Later that month, he was signed by the Tigers. He made 41 relief appearances for the Tigers in 1957, going 3–3 with a 3.76 ERA. On May 30 of that year, he hit a game ending home run, to become one of ten pitchers to accomplish that feat since the 1957 season.

Sleater played his final season in 1958. He started the year with the Tigers, but after posting a 6.75 ERA in four games with them he was purchased by the Orioles on June 2. He appeared in six games with the Orioles, going 1–0 with a 12.86 ERA. Overall, Sleater went 1–0 with a 10.22 ERA in 10 relief appearances. He played his final major league game on September 28, and was released by the Orioles on October 16, 1959.

Sleater played for a total of six major league teams in his seven-year career. Overall, Sleater went 12–18 with a 4.70 ERA. Of the 131 games he pitched, he started 21 of them. In 300 2/3 innings, he allowed 306 hits, 172 walks and he struck out only 152 batters. He was a solid batter, hitting .204 in 103 career at-bats. He hit four career home runs – including three in 1957 – and he struck out only 11 times. He was a lackluster fielder, with a fielding percentage of only .906.

He also played for 12 different minor league teams, winning 12 or more games three times in a season.

During spring training for the Browns one year, Ned Garver had pitched eight hitless innings against the Cardinals in Houston. His manager asked him if he wanted to pitch the ninth to complete the no hitter, but Garver declined, as he was more concerned with conditioning himself for the regular season. Sleater entered the game and pitched a clean ninth to complete the no hitter.
