= Tom Upton =

American baseball player

- Shortstop
- Born: December 29, 1926; Esther, Missouri
- Died: March 24, 2008 (aged 81); Downey, California
- Batted: Right Threw: Right

MLB debut
- April 19, 1950, for the St. Louis Browns

Last MLB appearance
- April 30, 1952, for the Washington Senators

MLB statistics
- Batting average: .225
- Home runs: 2
- Runs batted in: 42
- Stats at Baseball Reference

Teams
- St. Louis Browns (1950–1951); Washington Senators (1952)

Thomas Herbert "Muscles" Upton (December 29, 1926 – March 24, 2008) was a professional athlete. He was a right-handed Major League Baseball shortstop who played for the St. Louis Browns from 1950 to 1951, and for the Washington Senators in 1952.

== Early life and education ==
Upton was born in Esther, Missouri. In between playing professional baseball, he attended Bucknell University and University of Pennsylvania. He also attended Southeast Missouri State University, but did not play for them.

== Athletic career ==
Upton began his professional (minor league) career in 1944, after being signed by the New York Yankees. He split the 1944 season between the Norfolk Tars and Kansas City Blues, hitting a combined .140 with a .162 slugging percentage in 222 at-bat. He did not play in 1945 or 1946, however in 1947 he played for the Tars and Binghamton Triplets, hitting .227 in 100 games. For the Ventura Yankees, Quincy Gems and Triplets in 1948, he hit .271 in 398 at-bats. In 638 at-bats for the Beaumont Exporters in 1949, he hit .265 with a career-high four home runs.

Upton was drafted from the Yankees by the Browns in the 1949 Rule 5 draft, and on April 19, 1950, he made his big league debut. He was the Browns' regular shortstop that year, hitting .237 with two home runs and seven stolen bases in 389 at-bats. He showed a good eye at the plate, walking 52 times and striking out only 45 times.

In 52 games in 1951, Upton hit only .198, so he spent 34 games with the Kansas City Blues that year as well, hitting .233. On November 27, 1951, he was traded with Sherm Lollar and Al Widmar to the Chicago White Sox for Joe DeMaestri, Gordon Goldsberry, Dick Littlefield, Gus Niarhos and Jim Rivera. Upton was then traded by the White Sox to the Senators for Sam Dente.

He appeared in five games for the Senators in 1952, going hitless in five at-bats. On May 3 of that year, Upton was traded with Irv Noren to the Yankees for Jackie Jensen, Spec Shea, Jerry Snyder and Archie Wilson. In the minors the rest of the year, he hit .226 in 72 games split between the Beaumont Roughnecks and the Syracuse Chiefs.

On April 30, 1952, Upton played in his final big league game. Overall, he hit .225 in 181 major league games. In the minors, he hit .239 in 530 games.

== After baseball ==
Upton died in 2008 at age 81 in Downey, California.

== Personal life ==
Upton's brother Bill also played major league baseball.
