= Sleater =

Sleater may refer to:

- Lou Sleater (1926–2013), Major League Baseball pitcher
- Sleater-Kinney, musical act

== See also ==
- Slater
