= 1952 New York Yankees season =

Season for the Major League Baseball team the New York Yankees

1952 New York Yankees
- World Series champions American League champions
- League: American League
- Ballpark: Yankee Stadium
- City: New York City
- Record: 95–59 (.617)
- League place: 1st
- Owners: Dan Topping and Del Webb
- General managers: George Weiss
- Managers: Casey Stengel
- Television: WPIX
- Radio: WINS (AM) (Mel Allen, Bill Crowley, Art Gleeson, Joe DiMaggio)

The 1952 New York Yankees season was the 50th season for the Yankees. The team finished with a record of 95–59, winning their 19th pennant, finishing two games ahead of the Cleveland Indians. New York was managed by Casey Stengel. The Yankees played their home games at Yankee Stadium. In the World Series, they defeated the Brooklyn Dodgers in seven games. This was their fourth consecutive World Series win, tying the record they had set during 1936–1939. It was also the first season that the Yankees aired their games exclusively on WPIX-TV, an arrangement that would last until the end of the 1998 season. The channel was also the home of the baseball Giants broadcasts from 1949; thus, it was the first time ever that the channel had broadcast both the AL and NL baseball teams from the city. In 2016, when WPIX resumed FTA broadcasts of Yankees games in association with the current cable broadcaster YES Network, the channel returned to being the sole FTA broadcaster for the city's MLB franchises, as it is also currently the FTA broadcaster for the New York Mets, the Yankees officially ended that partnership again in 2021.

== Offseason ==
- December 3, 1951: Rubén Gómez was drafted by the Yankees from the St. Jean Canadians in the 1951 minor league draft.
- December 11, 1951: Joe DiMaggio retires from playing.

== Regular season ==
Joe DiMaggio's number 5 was retired by the New York Yankees in 1952.

=== Season standings ===
American League
Team	W	L	Pct.	GB	Home	Road
New York Yankees	95	59	.617	—	49‍–‍28	46‍–‍31
Cleveland Indians	93	61	.604	2	49‍–‍28	44‍–‍33
Chicago White Sox	81	73	.526	14	44‍–‍33	37‍–‍40
Philadelphia Athletics	79	75	.513	16	45‍–‍32	34‍–‍43
Washington Senators	78	76	.506	17	42‍–‍35	36‍–‍41
Boston Red Sox	76	78	.494	19	50‍–‍27	26‍–‍51
St. Louis Browns	64	90	.416	31	42‍–‍35	22‍–‍55
Detroit Tigers	50	104	.325	45	32‍–‍45	18‍–‍59

=== Record vs. opponents ===
1952 American League record Sources:
Team	BOS	CWS	CLE	DET	NYY	PHA	SLB	WSH
Boston	—	12–10	9–13	16–6	8–14	12–10	11–11	8–14
Chicago	10–12	—	8–14–1	17–5	8–14	11–11	14–8	13–9–1
Cleveland	13–9	14–8–1	—	16–6	10–12	13–9	15–7	12–10
Detroit	6–16	5–17	6–16	—	9–13	5–17–1	8–14	11–11–1
New York	14–8	14–8	12–10	13–9	—	13–9	14–8	15–7
Philadelphia	10–12	11–11	9–13	17–5–1	9–13	—	14–8	9–13
St. Louis	11–11	8–14	7–15	14–8	8–14	8–14	—	8–14–1
Washington	14–8	9–13–1	10–12	11–11–1	7–15	13–9	14–8–1	—

=== Notable transactions ===
- June 1952: Rubén Gómez was released by the Yankees.
- August 28, 1952: Jim Greengrass, Bob Marquis, Ernie Nevel, Johnny Schmitz and $35,000 were traded by the Yankees to the Cincinnati Reds for Ewell Blackwell.

=== Roster ===
1952 New York Yankees
Roster
Pitchers: 40 Ewell Blackwell; 24 Tom Gorman; 21 Bob Kuzava; 30 Eddie Lopat; 18,19 Jim McDonald; 23 Bill Miller; 28 Tom Morgan; 35 Joe Ostrowski; 17 Vic Raschi; 22 Allie Reynolds; 11 Johnny Sain; 18 Ray Scarborough; 34,39 Harry Schaeffer; 20 Art Schallock; 40 Johnny Schmitz	Catchers: 8 Yogi Berra; 32 Ralph Houk; 29 Charlie Silvera; Infielders: 38 Loren Babe; 27 Jim Brideweser; 6 Bobby Brown; 54,6 Andy Carey; 42 Jerry Coleman; 41 Joe Collins; 38 Johnny Hopp; 1 Billy Martin; 12 Gil McDougald; 36 Johnny Mize; 10 Phil Rizzuto; 34 Kal Segrist	Outfielders: 9 Hank Bauer; 34 Bob Cerv; 25 Jackie Jensen; 28,99 Charlie Keller; 7 Mickey Mantle; 25 Irv Noren; 14 Gene Woodling; Other batters: 15 Archie Wilson	Manager: 37 Casey Stengel; Coaches: 2 Frankie Crosetti; 33 Bill Dickey; 31 Jim Turner

== Player stats ==
= Indicates team leader

=== Batting ===
==== Starters by position ====
Note: Pos = Position; G = Games played; AB = At bats; H = Hits; Avg. = Batting average; HR = Home runs; RBI = Runs batted in

Pos	Player	G	AB	H	Avg.	HR	RBI
C	Yogi Berra	142	534	146	.273	30	98
1B	Joe Collins	122	428	120	.280	18	59
2B	Billy Martin	109	363	97	.267	3	33
3B	Gil McDougald	152	555	146	.263	11	78
SS	Phil Rizzuto	152	578	147	.254	2	43
OF	Mickey Mantle	142	549	171	.311	23	87
OF	Hank Bauer	141	553	162	.293	17	74
OF	Gene Woodling	122	408	126	.309	12	63

==== Other batters ====
Note: G = Games played; AB = At bats; H = Hits; Avg. = Batting average; HR = Home runs; RBI = Runs batted in

Player	G	AB	H	Avg.	HR	RBI
Irv Noren	93	272	65	.235	5	21
Johnny Mize	78	137	36	.263	4	29
Bobby Brown	29	89	22	.247	1	14
Bob Cerv	36	87	21	.241	1	8
Charlie Silvera	20	55	18	.327	0	11
Jerry Coleman	11	42	17	.405	0	4
Andy Carey	16	40	6	.150	0	1
Jim Brideweser	42	38	10	.263	0	2
Johnny Hopp	15	25	4	.160	0	2
Kal Segrist	13	23	1	.043	0	1
Loren Babe	12	21	2	.095	0	0
Jackie Jensen	7	19	2	.105	0	2
Ralph Houk	9	6	2	.333	0	0
Archie Wilson	3	2	1	.500	0	1
Charlie Keller	2	1	0	.000	0	0

=== Pitching ===
= Indicates league leader

==== Starting pitchers ====
Note: G = Games pitched; IP = Innings pitched; W = Wins; L = Losses; ERA = Earned run average; SO = Strikeouts

Player	G	IP	W	L	ERA	SO
Allie Reynolds	35	244.1	20	8	2.06	160
Vic Raschi	31	223.0	16	6	2.78	127
Ed Lopat	20	149.1	10	5	2.53	56
Tom Morgan	16	93.2	5	4	3.07	34

==== Other pitchers ====
Note: G = Games pitched; IP = Innings pitched; W = Wins; L = Losses; ERA = Earned run average; SO = Strikeouts

Player	G	IP	W	L	ERA	SO
Johnny Sain	35	148.1	11	6	3.46	57
Bob Kuzava	28	133.0	8	8	3.45	67
Bill Miller	21	88.0	4	6	3.48	45
Jim McDonald	26	69.1	3	4	3.50	20
Tom Gorman	12	60.2	6	2	4.60	31
Ray Scarborough	9	34.0	5	1	2.91	13
Harry Schaeffer	5	17.0	0	1	5.29	15
Ewell Blackwell	5	16.0	1	0	0.56	7
Johnny Schmitz	5	15.0	1	1	3.60	3

==== Relief pitchers ====
Note: G = Games pitched; W = Wins; L = Losses; SV = Saves; ERA = Earned run average; SO = Strikeouts

Player	G	W	L	SV	ERA	SO
Bobby Hogue	27	3	5	4	5.32	12
Joe Ostrowski	20	2	2	2	5.63	17
Art Schallock	2	0	0	0	9.00	1

== World series ==
AL New York Yankees (4) vs. NL Brooklyn Dodgers (3)

Game	Score	Date	Location	Attendance
1	Yankees – 2, Dodgers – 4	October 1	Ebbets Field	34,861
2	Yankees – 7, Dodgers – 1	October 2	Ebbets Field	33,792
3	Dodgers – 5, Yankees – 3	October 3	Yankee Stadium	66,698
4	Dodgers – 0, Yankees – 2	October 4	Yankee Stadium	71,787
5	Dodgers – 6, Yankees – 5 (11 innings)	October 5	Yankee Stadium	70,356
6	Yankees – 3, Dodgers – 2	October 6	Ebbets Field	30,037
7	Yankees – 4, Dodgers – 2	October 7	Ebbets Field	33,195

== Awards and honors ==
- Johnny Mize, Babe Ruth Award

All-Star Game

- Hank Bauer - Starter
- Yogi Berra - Starter
- Vic Raschi - Starter
- Phil Rizzuto - Starter

== Farm system ==
Level	Team	League	Manager
AAA	Kansas City Blues	American Association	George Selkirk
AA	Beaumont Roughnecks	Texas League	Harry Craft
A	Binghamton Triplets	Eastern League	Jim Gleeson
B	Quincy Gems	Illinois–Indiana–Iowa League	Paul Chervinko
B	Norfolk Tars	Piedmont League	Mayo Smith
C	Boise Yankees	Pioneer League	Wayne Tucker
C	Joplin Miners	Western Association	Vern Hoscheit
D	Olean Yankees	PONY League	Bunny Mick
D	McAlester Rockets	Sooner State League	Bill Cope
D	Fond du Lac Panthers	Wisconsin State League	James Adlam and Jack Wilkinson

LEAGUE CHAMPIONS: Kansas City, Binghamton, Joplin, McAlester
