= Ned Garver =

American baseball player (1925–2017)

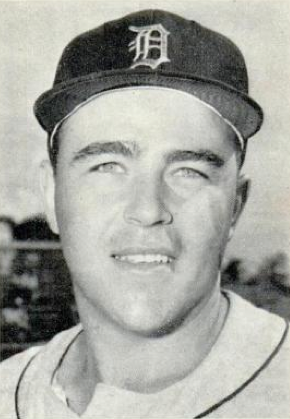
- Garver in 1956
- Pitcher
- Born: December 25, 1925; Ney, Ohio, U.S.
- Died: February 26, 2017 (aged 91); Bryan, Ohio, U.S.
- Batted: Right Threw: Right

MLB debut
- April 28, 1948, for the St. Louis Browns

Last MLB appearance
- June 4, 1961, for the Los Angeles Angels

MLB statistics
- Win–loss record: 129–157
- Earned run average: 3.73
- Strikeouts: 881
- Stats at Baseball Reference

Teams
- St. Louis Browns (1948–1952); Detroit Tigers (1952–1956); Kansas City Athletics (1957–1960); Los Angeles Angels (1961)

Career highlights and awards
- All-Star (1951)

Ned Franklin Garver (December 25, 1925 – February 26, 2017) was an American professional baseball player. He played in Major League Baseball (MLB) as a right-handed pitcher for the St. Louis Browns (1948–1952), the Detroit Tigers (1952–1956), the Kansas City Athletics (1957–1960), and the Los Angeles Angels (1961). Garver and Irv Young are the only pitchers in the modern era of baseball (since 1901) to win 20 or more games for a team that lost 100 games.

A native of Ney, Ohio, Garver grew up rooting for the Tigers. Signed by the Browns in 1944, he reached the major leagues with the team in 1948. Poor run support contributed to his tying for the American League (AL) lead with 17 losses in 1949. However, in 1951, he posted a 20–12 record for the ballclub, during a season in which the Browns had a 52–102 record. Casey Stengel picked him to start the All-Star Game that year.

Garver suffered a pinched vertebra in 1952, an injury that would forever alter the way he would pitch. Though never as successful after that, he remained in the major leagues through the 1961 season, relying more heavily on adjusting pitch velocity and the angle at which he threw the ball to fool hitters. Traded to the Tigers in 1952, Garver remained with the team through the 1956 season. After that, he pitched four seasons with the Athletics before finishing up with the Angels in 1961. Following his career, Garver moved back to Ney, where he concentrated on farming while also serving as the town's mayor for some years.

== Early life ==
Ned Franklin Garver was born on December 25, 1925, in Ney, Ohio, to parents Arl and Susie Garver. He was the fourth of five children. The Garvers lived on a wheat farm, which they tended using horses. Though Garver's mother wanted him to be a preacher or an undertaker, his father encouraged him to play baseball; the older Garver was once a successful amateur pitcher. Ned grew up rooting for the Detroit Tigers, the closest Major League Baseball (MLB) team to Ney. He recalled awakening at midnight and getting the chores done early so that his family could arrive early at Briggs Stadium to watch a doubleheader, something the Garvers did several times during his youth. Because they did not have enough money to buy concessions at the games, Garver would bring a picnic basket with sandwiches made from home. Tommy Bridges was one of his favorite players.

Garver started pitching for his town's local semipro baseball team, also playing baseball and basketball at Ney High School. As a senior in 1943, Garver helped the high school baseball team reach the state championship, where he suffered the loss in a 3–2 defeat.

Garver's performance with the semipro team caused three MLB teams to be interested in him: the St. Louis Browns, the Pittsburgh Pirates, and the Washington Senators. He did not think he would be able to take advantage of any of these opportunities, as he enlisted in the United States Naval Air Corps in the fall of 1943. However, Garver was discharged the following spring because his feet were flat. Garver's manager with the semipro team, P. L. McCormick, contacted the Browns, who signed Garver to a minor league contract.

== Professional career ==
=== Minor leagues (1944–1947) ===
Garver began his professional career at age 18 in 1944 with the Newark Moundsmen, St. Louis' affiliate in the Ohio State League (OSL). On July 19, he threw a no hitter against the Marion Diggers. Garver ultimately pitched in 32 games for the team, going 21–8. He led the OSL in wins, earned run average (ERA) (1.21), and innings pitched (245). In the playoffs, he defeated the Middletown Red Sox three times, ultimately helping the Moundsmen to the first OSL championship since the league was put on hiatus due to World War II.

The following season, Garver pitched briefly for the Browns' Single-A affiliate, the Elmira Pioneers of the Eastern League, before being promoted to the Double-A Toledo Mud Hens of the American Association. In Toledo, he served as both a starting pitcher and a reliever, starting 15 games while making 16 relief appearance. He went 5–8 with an ERA of 4.64 and a walks plus hits per inning pitched (WHIP) figure of 1.712.

In 1946, Garver was sent to the San Antonio Missions, another Double-A team in the St. Louis Browns organization, and he would stay there until the end of the 1947 season. During his two years in San Antonio, Garver went 25–22 with an ERA of 3.43. According to Garver, the Browns nearly called him up in September 1947 when rosters expanded in September, but they decided to keep him in San Antonio when Ox Miller had his contract sold to the Chicago Cubs, as this left the Missions short of pitchers.

=== St. Louis Browns (1948–1952) ===
==== 1948 ====
Garver attended spring training with the Browns in 1948. "[He] likes to pitch and know how to pitch," manager Zack Taylor said, though he was not certain what role he would use Garver in. Garver was afraid he would be sent back to the minor leagues. However, late in spring training, Taylor became impatient waiting for pitcher Cliff Fannin to begin warming up for a start against the Cleveland Indians and chose to start Garver instead. Garver allowed one hit against a lineup composed mostly of major league regulars and was named to St. Louis's roster to begin the season.

Garver's MLB debut was not as a pitcher, but as a pinch runner, on April 28 in a 9–4 loss to the Detroit Tigers. His pitching debut came at Griffith Stadium when he started against the Senators on May 9. Garver recalled Taylor having Sam Zoldak warm up as well before the game. "I guess he didn’t think I’d make it," Garver said. The pitcher felt nervous and allowed three runs in the first inning. He followed the first inning with five scoreless innings but still earned the loss in a 3–1 defeat. After losing his second start to the Tigers on May 15, Garver won his first game in his third start, allowing just two unearned runs on May 22 in a 4–2 win over Washington.

Used mainly as a starting pitcher through the end of June, Garver then made a number of relief appearances in the second half of the season, although he still started several games. On September 4, he pitched 10 innings, driving in the winning run with a walk-off RBI single against Ed Klieman in a 2–1 victory over the Cleveland Indians. The Sporting News called him one of the "cagiest young pitchers in the circuit" in its September 15 issue. In 38 games (24 starts), Garver had a 7–11 record, a 3.41 ERA, 75 strikeouts, 95 walks, and 200 hits allowed in 198 innings.

==== 1949 ====
In 1949, Garver was named the Browns' Opening Day starter, the first of four consecutive years in which he would start their first game. Against the Indians in St. Louis's first game on April 19, he threw a complete game, outpitching Cleveland starter Bob Feller in a 5–1 victory. Years later, Garver remembered the victory as "special" because the Indians had just won the World Series, and "to beat [Feller] was a miracle!" Again facing the Indians on May 30, he and Gene Bearden entered the 12th inning having allowed each other's teams to score just once. Garver took the loss when Ken Keltner hit a game-ending sacrifice fly with two outs in the bottom of the inning. He threw his first major league shutout on June 29, holding the White Sox to five hits in a 1–0 victory. In 41 games (32 starts), Garver had a 12–17 record, tying with Paul Calvert and Sid Hudson of Washington for the American League (AL) lead in losses, though the low-scoring Browns were held to three runs or less in 14 of Garver's defeats. He had a 3.98 ERA, 70 strikeouts, 102 walks, and 245 hits allowed in 223 2/3 innings.

==== 1950 ====
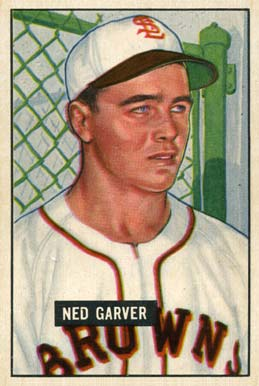
1951 Bowman baseball card of Garver with the Browns

Against the Tigers on May 13, 1950, Garver and Virgil Trucks each pitched 10 scoreless innings for their teams before Vic Wertz won the game in the 11th inning for Detroit with a two-out single. After the Browns were defeated 20–4 by the Boston Red Sox on June 7 and 29–4 on June 8, it was Garver's turn to pitch in the final game of the series on June 9. He struggled in the first inning, and catcher Sherm Lollar suggested that he try to "loosen" the Boston hitters. Garver responded by throwing brushback pitches at them in the next inning. He allowed seven runs in seven innings but earned the victory in a 12–7 triumph, receiving a free steak afterwards from a grateful manager Taylor.

None of the Browns' relief pitchers had an ERA under 5.00 in 1950, and Taylor allowed Garver to complete 17 of his final 18 starts. The stretch started with a game against the White Sox on June 30, in which Garver pitched 12 2/3 innings against the White Sox but suffered the loss in a 3–2 defeat when Gus Zernial hit a game-ending home run. In 1950, Garver led the AL with 22 complete games and finishing with a 3.39 ERA, second to Early Wynn's 3.20. His record was 13–18 with the 58-96 Browns, though the 18 losses only tied him for third in the AL this time (with Ray Scarborough).

==== 1951 ====
On June 1, 1951, Garver threw a shutout against the Red Sox, recording two RBI as a hitter as St. Louis won 4–0. Arm soreness caused him to miss the final two weeks of June, yet Casey Stengel chose Garver to start the All-Star Game in early July, which Garver later called "one of the biggest thrills I've ever experienced." He allowed one unearned run in three innings, receiving a no decision in an 8–3 defeat.

Against the Philadelphia Athletics on August 24, Garver was the pitcher for the Browns on "Grandstand Managers Night," a promotion in which the fans held up large placards with "Yes" or "No" printed on them and made decisions on the team's strategy in the game against the Athletics. Garver recalled at one point during the game, the Athletics had runners on first and third base with only one out. He wanted the team to play the infielders farther to the plate, which would make a double play more likely. The fans, however, voted twice to play the infield in. Realizing this was not a good strategy, catcher Sherm Lollar called time and headed out to the mound to talk to Garver, then started walking around behind home plate when he returned to his position, to delay the game. Prompted a third time by the coach as to whether to play the infield in or not, the fans finally changed their vote to "No." Garver got Pete Suder to hit into a double play to end the inning, and he pitched a complete game as the Browns won 5–3.

Facing the White Sox in the season's final game on September 30, Garver needed a victory to attain the 20-win milestone. With the score tied at four in the fourth inning, Garver hit his only home run of the season, against Randy Gumpert, to put his team ahead. With Garver not pitching well in the early innings, Lollar suggested that the pitcher rely on his sinking fastball exclusively for a few innings, then return to throwing all his pitches later in the game. After allowing four runs through the first four innings, Garver allowed just one unearned run the rest of the game. The Browns won 9–5, and Garver won his 20th. The Commissioner of Baseball sent him a plaque to commemorate the victory.

In 1951, Garver compiled a 20–12 record with a 3.73 ERA, 84 strikeouts, 96 walks, and 237 hits allowed in 246 innings. Offensively, he compiled .305 batting average with one home run and nine RBI. He was also used as a pinch hitter and pinch runner. The Browns finished last in the American League with a 52–102 record, meaning Garver recorded the win in 38% of his team's victories. He was the first pitcher to win 20 games with a last-place team since Sloppy Thurston did so for the White Sox in 1924, and he was one of two pitchers in the 20th century to win 20 or more games for a team which lost 100 or more games in the same season, along with Irv Young, who went 20-21 for the 51-103 1905 Boston Braves. He led the AL with 24 complete games, the second year in a row he had thrown the most. In Most Valuable Player (MVP) Award voting, Garver received the same number of first-place votes as New York Yankees players Yogi Berra and Allie Reynolds, though Berra ultimately took the most shares on ballots and won the award.

===== Views on the reserve clause =====
Over the 1951-52 offseason, the United States House of Representatives held hearings on the legality of MLB's exemption from antitrust laws. New York Representative Emanuel Celler wrote Garver a letter asking him to testify before Congress on the subject. Garver was unable to appear because he was on a barnstorming tour with Satchel Paige, but he did write a letter back to Celler with his views on the subject. Regarding baseball's reserve clause, Garver felt there was no adequate substitute to prevent one team from stockpiling all of the good players by offering them the most money. He did propose an arbitration system, in which players with at least three years experience could have a panel determine their salary. "I do not care where I play baseball as long as I feel I am getting paid what I am worth," Garver said in an interview with The Sporting News.

==== 1952 ====
Before the 1952 season, Veeck made Garver the highest paid member in team history with a salary of $25,000. Brimming with confidence at the start of the year, Garver threw shutouts in his first two starts, against the Tigers on April 15 and the White Sox on April 20. As he was throwing batting practice between that and his next game, he suffered a pinched vertebra in his neck. The injury affected how he threw, and he battled arm fatigue, suffering further injury to the arm as he continued to try to pitch.

On June 9, the Browns fired manager Rogers Hornsby, and the grateful players presented their owner with a trophy for getting rid of the hated manager. According to Garver, his teammates bought the trophy without his knowledge, but as their player representative, he was the one to present it to Veeck. Following his 21st start on August 11, he had a 7–10 record, a 3.69 ERA, 60 strikeouts, 55 walks, and 130 hits allowed in 148 2/3 innings pitched.

On August 14, Garver became part of what The Sporting News called at the time the "biggest ‘waiver’ deal in baseball history" when he was traded to the Tigers with Jim Delsing, Bud Black, and Dave Madison for slugger Vic Wertz, Don Lenhardt, Dick Littlefield, and Marlin Stuart.

=== Detroit Tigers (1952–1956) ===
==== 1952 ====
Garver called the trade "a dream come true," as it put him on the team he grew up rooting for. However, he made only one start for his new organization on August 17 before having to be shut down for the rest of the season with arm soreness. Over the offseason, an osteopath diagnosed him with adhesions in the elbow. Maneuvering the elbow, the doctor snapped them, enabling Garver to continue his career. "I was never as good after that," Garver said, yet he was still able to pitch in the major leagues through the 1961 season, relying on changing speeds and altering arm angles to get hitters out.

==== 1953 ====
Facing the Browns on Opening Day in 1953, Garver allowed four runs in two innings, taking the loss in a 10–0 defeat. In his third start of the season, Garver damaged cartilage in his left knee. For the rest of the year, the knee would regularly pop out of its socket during games, requiring Tigers trainer Jack Homel or first baseman Walt Dropo to pop it back in place so Garver could continue pitching. The knee injury limited his mobility, and he had to have the joint tightly wrapped to be able to pitch. Alterations to his delivery forced by the injury caused back problems. Despite the health issues, Garver pitched 10 or more innings four times in 1953, though he only recorded the win in one of those outings. In 30 games (26 starts), he had an 11–11 record, a 4.45 ERA, 69 strikeouts, 66 walks, and 228 hits allowed in 198 1/3 innings. The 4.45 ERA was his highest total in any of his full seasons.

==== 1954 ====
In his first start of 1954, on April 17 against the Baltimore Orioles, (Note: The Browns had moved to Baltimore after the 1953 season, changing their name to the Orioles.) Garver allowed five hits and no runs, throwing a shutout in a 1–0 victory. He led the AL in ERA in mid-May 1954, having posted an 0.49 mark in his first five games. After Garver's second shutout of the year on July 30, in which he held the Red Sox to four hits in a 5–0 win, general manager Muddy Ruel observed that the pitcher seemed more confident this season. He threw a third shutout on August 10, outpitching Wynn in a 4–0 victory over Cleveland that biographer Gregory H. Wolf called "impressive". In 35 games (32 starts), he had a 14–11 record, 93 strikeouts, 62 walks, and 216 hits allowed in 246 1/3 innings. His 2.81 ERA was seventh in the AL, and his 16 complete games tied for fifth in the league, with Trucks and Arnie Portocarrero. Though sabermetrics had not been developed at the time, Garver's 4.4 wins above replacement was the sixth-best mark among AL pitchers.

==== 1955 ====
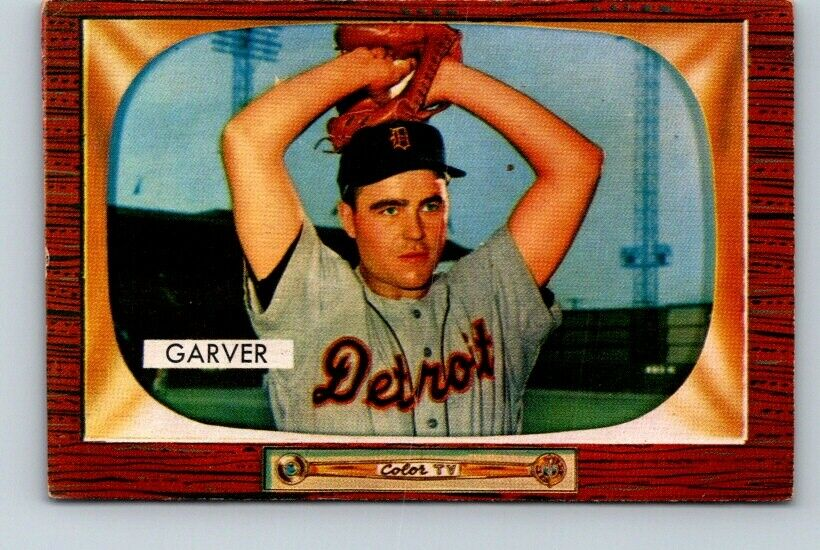
1955 Bowman baseball card of Garver with the Tigers

The 1955 Tigers were the first winning MLB team Garver had ever played for. On June 7, Garver pitched all 12 innings of a game against the Yankees, allowing three runs and earning the victory when Fred Hatfield hit a home run in the bottom of the 12th inning. In July, Garver allowed 10 runs in 45 innings over five consecutive starts, each of which he won. Detroit contended for the pennant until August, when a 12–18 record took them out of competition. Garver, who had posted a 10–9 record through July 26, lost seven of his final nine decisions, posting a 5.61 ERA over that span, though the Tigers also did not score many runs for him. In 33 games (32 starts), Garver had a 12–16 record, a 3.98 ERA, 83 strikeouts, and 67 walks in 230 2/3 innings. His 16 losses were third in the AL, behind Jim Wilson's 18 and Bob Porterfield's 17. Garver led the AL with 102 earned runs allowed and 251 hits allowed.

==== 1956 ====
Before his first start of the 1956 season, on April 20, Garver injured his elbow while throwing curveballs in cold weather during batting practice. The Sporting News reported that his career might be over. He pitched one game in May, three in July, and one in September. In those six games (three starts), he had an 0–2 record, a 4.08 ERA, six strikeouts, 13 walks, and 15 hits allowed in 17 2/3 innings. On December 5, Garver, Trucks, Wayne Belardi, Gene Host, and $20,000 in cash were traded to the Kansas City Athletics (Note: The Philadelphia Athletics had moved to Kansas City following the 1954 season.) for Eddie Robinson, Bill Harrington, Jim Finigan, and Jack Crimian.

=== Kansas City Athletics (1957–1960) ===
==== 1957 ====
"I thought Kansas City was the closest thing to a small town of all the big towns I had seen, and I liked that," Garver said of pitching for the Athletics. Local automobile dealer Mel Hilliard provided Garver with a car whenever he needed one. With the pitcher returning from serious injury in 1957, the Athletics lengthened the time between his starts to minimize stress on his arm. Despite this, Garver would still lead Kansas City pitchers with 23 starts and 145 1/3 innings pitched. On May 31, he won his 100th career game, holding the Indians to one unearned run in a 3–1 victory. He pitched what Wolf called "arguably his best game in his career" in the first outing of an August 11 doubleheader, holding the Indians to two hits in a 7–0 shutout. However, that shutout was his only victory between May 31 and his final start of the year on September 22. He had a 6–13 record, a 3.84 ERA, 61 strikeouts, and 55 walks.

==== 1958 ====
As the Opening Day starter for the Athletics in 1958, Garver held the Indians to seven hits and no runs in a 5–0 shutout victory on April 15. In May, he recorded two additional shutouts, a 3–0 victory over Chicago on May 15 and a 4–0 triumph over Baltimore on May 25. In the first game of a doubleheader against the White Sox on August 13, Garver allowed one run in 11 innings, earning the win after a Harry Simpson home run gave Kansas City the lead in the top of the 11th. Appearing in 31 games (28 starts), Garver had a 12–11 record, a 4.03 ERA, 72 strikeouts, 66 walks, and 192 hits allowed in 201 innings pitched.

==== 1959 ====
Garver was the number two starter in Kansas City's rotation in 1959, behind Bob Grim. In his second start of the year, he pitched a five-hit shutout against the White Sox on April 16. Against Baltimore on June 21, Garver pitched a three-hit shutout while contributing offensively, as he recorded a double, a home run, two runs scored, and two RBI in a 7–0 win. He had hits in all four of his at bats on July 5 against the White Sox, including a home run against Barry Latman, but he took the loss after Nellie Fox singled to score the go-ahead run in the 10th inning of a 4–3 defeat. In 32 games (30 starts), he had a 10–13 record, a 3.71 ERA, 61 strikeouts, 42 walks, and 214 hits allowed in 201 1/3 innings.

==== 1960 ====
After Garver lost his first five decisions of the 1960 season and posted an 8.18 ERA through June 5, he was moved to the bullpen. He did not rejoin the rotation until late August, when Kansas City played a couple of doubleheaders. However, in his return to the rotation, Garver completed four of his seven starts and posted a 1.60 ERA. Facing the Yankees in the second game of a doubleheader on August 31, he allowed just four hits in a 6–0 shutout victory. He allowed just three hits in his final start of the year, a 4–0 shutout of Cleveland on September 28. In 28 games (15 starts), he had a 4–9 record, a 3.83 ERA, 50 strikeouts, 35 walks, and 110 hits allowed in 122 1/3 innings.

=== Los Angeles Angels (1961) ===
The Athletics left Garver unprotected in the 1960 Major League Baseball expansion draft, and he was selected by the Los Angeles Angels. Though Garver started his first appearance of the 1961 season Angels, he was mainly used as a relief pitcher, a fact he attributed partly to a typically unsuccessful spring training campaign. He struggled to adjust to serving as a relief pitcher, noting that "my arm was not up to warming up often or several days in a row." His final game with the organization came on June 4, when he allowed a run in two innings of relief during an 8–4 loss to Cleveland. On a road trip to Baltimore in early June, the Angels released him, asking him to return the meal money he had been given for the remaining four days of the road trip. In 12 games (two starts), he had an 0–2 record, a 5.59 ERA, nine strikeouts, 16 walks, and 40 hits allowed in 29 innings.

The White Sox, Reds, and the expansion Houston Colt .45s inquired about Garver's services for the 1962 season, but he decided to retire.

== Career statistics ==
In a 14-season MLB career, Garver pitched in 402 games, 330 of which were starts. He had a 129–157 record, a 3.73 ERA, 881 strikeouts, 881 walks, and 2,471 hits allowed in 2,477 1/3 innings pitched. Garver threw 153 complete games, 18 of which were shutouts. As a hitter, Garver had a career .218 batting average (180-for-827) with 87 runs scored, seven home runs, 72 RBI, and 76 walks.

== Pitching style ==
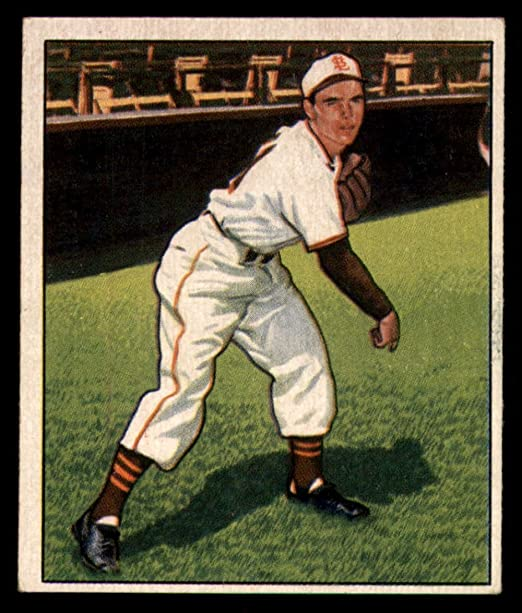
1950 Bowman baseball card showing Garver after throwing a pitch

Garver never threw as hard as most MLB pitchers. His primary pitch was a sinking fastball. During the 1947 season, he figured out how to throw a slider while playing catch with another player before a game. By putting pressure on his next-to-index finger, he could make the ball change directions as it came to the plate. "That pitch took me to the big leagues, and it kept me there," he credited its importance. He actually had two different types of sliders. Against left-handers, he threw one in the manner of a forward pass in football. "It would break back in and hit you on the fist of the bat," he said. The other one he threw with a three-quarters delivery. "I could make the ball drop out and down," he said of this pitch, which was more effective against right-handers. Garver was most effective when he could keep the ball lower in the strike zone, and at the edges of the plate. He hoped that hitters would make early contact with his pitches, which would prevent them from figuring out all the different ways he could throw the ball. He would try to add to his array of pitches during spring training, using the time for experimentation. After his injury in 1952, Garver continued to pitch by changing speeds on the ball and throwing from different angels: overhand, underhand, and sidearm. He seldom threw a traditional spitball, recalling Harmon Killebrew hitting a home run off of him in one of the only instances he ever threw it. However, he would apply a small amount of baby oil to his cap, touching the hat in that spot to get a better grip on his sinking fastball late in a game.

There were several strategies Garver used to relieve mental pressure in difficult situations. At crucial points in a ballgame, he would tell himself the game was just getting started to relax himself. He would also look around the stadium, finding a far off sign to focus on, in order to not concentrate on his worries.

Like many ballplayers of his day, Garver entertained certain superstitions. When he was pitching, he made sure to lead with his left foot when crossing the third base line, and he always avoided stepping right on the line. He also preferred to pick up the baseball he would start the inning with from the ground, rather than have a player or coach hand it to him. Once the inning had started, Garver wanted the third baseman to throw him the ball following each out.

== Legacy and life after baseball ==
Garver never played for a first division team, but he did not let that bother him. "I never felt sorry for myself as a St. Louis Brown," he said. "In fact, I loved that organization. They were the ones that gave me a chance to play." In a conversation with Joe DiMaggio, Ted Williams recalled having "trouble" with Garver. "He could throw anything up there and get me out." The U.S. Postal Service issued a commemorative postmark in Ney in 1996, marking the 45th anniversary of Garver's 20-win season.

Preferring to live in a small town, Garver and his family returned to Ney following his career. He had invested in farms in the area, and he made a living off of farming, as well as working at an area meat packing facility for 18 years. Garver served in local government positions as a member of Ney's Village Council and Ney's Park Board. He served as Ney's mayor for seven or eight years. (Note: In his autobiography, Garver says he was the mayor for seven years, but his New York Times obituary says he was mayor for eight.)

== Personal life ==
While still attending high school, Garver married Ney native Dorothy Sims. She was supportive of his professional baseball career, driving to the different cities he pitched in even when the couple had young children. Their offspring consisted of Donnie, Chery, and Ned Alan. When their kids reached school age, Dorothy would stay with them in Ney until school was out for the year, at which point the Garvers would rent a home in whatever city Ned's team was located in. Dorothy died of leukemia in 1995, and Garver remarried in 2001 to Dolores Hart. His nephew, Bruce Berenyi, became an MLB pitcher for the Cincinnati Reds and the New York Mets. Garver died of heart failure in Bryan, Ohio on February 26, 2017, at the age of 91.
