= Buck Varner =

American baseball player (1930-2000)

- Outfielder
- Born: August 17, 1930; Hixson, Tennessee, U.S.
- Died: April 29, 2000 (aged 69); Chattanooga, Tennessee, U.S.
- Batted: Left Threw: Right

MLB debut
- September 19, 1952, for the Washington Senators

Last MLB appearance
- September 23, 1952, for the Washington Senators

MLB statistics
- Batting average: .000
- At-bats: 4
- Stats at Baseball Reference

Teams
- Washington Senators (1952)

Glen Gann "Buck" Varner (August 17, 1930 – April 29, 2000) was an American professional baseball player. The outfielder, a native of Hixson, Tennessee, appeared in two Major League games for the Washington Senators during the 1952 season.

Varner's Major League trial came at the end of the 1952 minor league season, when he batted .290 with four home runs with Washington's Double-A farm club, the Chattanooga Lookouts. On September 19, he started in left field at Griffith Stadium against the Boston Red Sox, and was hitless in four plate appearances, with a base on balls, against Sid Hudson. Four days later, as a pinch hitter, he grounded out against venerable Philadelphia Athletics pitcher Bobo Newsom.

The 5 ft 10 in (1.78 m), 175 lb (79 kg) Varner batted left-handed and threw right-handed. He batted .277 in six minor league seasons (1948–1950; 1952–1954), missing the 1951 campaign due to service in the Korean War.
