= Harley Grossman =

American baseball player (1930–2003)

- Pitcher
- Born: May 5, 1930; Evansville, Indiana, U.S.
- Died: September 5, 2003 (aged 73); Evansville, Indiana, U.S.
- Batted: Right Threw: Right

MLB debut
- April 22, 1952, for the Washington Senators

Last MLB appearance
- April 22, 1952, for the Washington Senators

MLB statistics
- Win–loss record: 0–0
- Earned run average: 54.00
- Innings: 0⅓
- Stats at Baseball Reference

Teams
- Washington Senators (1952)

Harley Joseph Grossman (May 5, 1930 – September 5, 2003) was an American professional baseball player whose career lasted for five seasons (1949–1953) and who appeared in one Major League game as a relief pitcher for the 1952 Washington Senators. A native of Evansville, Indiana, Grossman attended Ball State University; he stood 6 feet (1.8 m) tall and weighed 170 pounds (77 kg).

On Tuesday afternoon, April 22, 1952, at Fenway Park, the 21-year-old rookie was called into service to relieve starting pitcher Joe Haynes in the sixth inning. The Boston Red Sox were leading 5–2, and had two runners on base with two out. Grossman surrendered an RBI single to Vern Stephens and a three-run home run to Walt Dropo, stretching Boston's lead to 9–2, before getting the third out by retiring Faye Throneberry on a ground ball. He then left the game for a pinch hitter. Grossman was charged with two earned runs on two hits in his one-third of an inning of work.

He then returned to minor league baseball, where he compiled a 42–20 win–loss mark over his first three seasons, and he played no further after the 1953 campaign.
