= Al Widmar =

American baseball player (1925–2005)

- Pitcher
- Born: March 20, 1925; Cleveland, Ohio, U.S.
- Died: October 15, 2005 (aged 80); Tulsa, Oklahoma, U.S.
- Batted: Right Threw: Right

MLB debut
- April 25, 1947, for the Boston Red Sox

Last MLB appearance
- April 17, 1952, for the Chicago White Sox

MLB statistics
- Win–loss record: 13–30
- Earned run average: 5.21
- Strikeouts: 143
- Stats at Baseball Reference

Teams
- As player: Boston Red Sox (1947); St. Louis Browns (1948, 1950–1951); Chicago White Sox (1952); As coach: Philadelphia Phillies (1962–1964, 1968–1969); Milwaukee Brewers (1973–1974); Toronto Blue Jays (1980–1989)

Albert Joseph Widmar (March 20, 1925 – October 15, 2005) was an American pitcher, pitching coach, scout and front-office executive in Major League Baseball (MLB). In addition to forging a 59-year career in professional baseball, he also played professional basketball for three seasons.

Widmar appeared in 114 games over all or part of five MLB seasons (1947–1948, 1950–1952) for the Boston Red Sox, St. Louis Browns and Chicago White Sox. A decade later, he returned to the majors as a pitching coach, serving in that role for 17 seasons between 1962 and 1989 for the Philadelphia Phillies, Milwaukee Brewers and Toronto Blue Jays.

== Playing career ==
Widmar was born in Cleveland, Ohio to a father from Slovenia and mother of Balkan descent. He, his parents and two brothers and two sisters spoke Slovenian at home. He attended Cathedral Latin High School. He batted and threw right-handed, stood 6 feet 3 inches (1.91 m) tall and weighed 185 pounds (84 kg).

He was originally signed by the Boston Red Sox in 1942, and played Minor League Baseball (MiLB) throughout the war years. Widmar made his MLB debut with Boston at Fenway Park on April 25, 1947, and appeared in two early-season games as a relief pitcher before returning to the minors. On November 17, 1947, the Red Sox packaged him in the blockbuster trade with the St. Louis Browns that brought All-Star shortstop Vern Stephens to Boston. After an unspectacular 1948 campaign with the Browns, he was demoted to St. Louis' Triple-A affiliate, the Baltimore Orioles of the International League. In 1949, with Baltimore, Widmar won 22 games to lead the league and was named an All-Star. In 1950, he returned to the Browns, mainly as a starting pitcher. After going 11–24 in 62 games over two seasons for a Browns team that lost a combined 198 games, Widmar was traded to the Chicago White Sox along with Sherm Lollar for Dick Littlefield, Joe DeMaestri, Gus Niarhos and Jim Rivera.

But after appearing in only one game with the White Sox, a two-inning relief stint on April 17, 1952, against the Cleveland Indians, Widmar was shipped back to the minors, where he spent the rest of his playing career. He finished 1952 with the Seattle Rainiers of the Pacific Coast League, and remained with the Rainiers through the early weeks of the 1955 season, winning 20 games in both 1952 and 1953. After eight appearances for Seattle in 1955, he donned a Tulsa Oilers uniform; he won 18 games that year, then at 31 he became the Oilers' player/manager from 1956 through 1958.

In all or parts of five MLB seasons, Widmar posted a 13–30 record, with 143 strikeouts, and a 5.21 earned run average (ERA), in 388 1/3 innings pitched. He surrendered 461 hits and 176 bases on balls. In 42 games started, he registered 12 complete games and one shutout, a three-hitter over the Philadelphia Athletics on September 12, 1950, at Shibe Park. Widmar posted six saves in 72 relief appearances.

Beginning in the late-1940s, Widmar began to play professional basketball in the off-season — in order to keep himself in shape. He played for the Binghamton Triplets of the Eastern Professional Basketball League (EPBL), and the Scranton Miners and Allentown / Carbondale Aces of the American Basketball League (ABL).

== Coaching career ==
The Tulsa Oilers became an affiliate of the Philadelphia Phillies in 1957, and in 1959, Widmar took on new responsibilities as the Phillies' roving minor-league pitching instructor. After three years in that job, he was promoted to the major-league Phillies, serving as pitching coach on the staff of manager Gene Mauch from 1962 through 1964, a period which saw the Phils rise from last place in the National League to three over-.500 seasons.

In 1964, they joined the ranks of the NL's pennant contenders; the team broke from the gate quickly, took over first place, and maintained their lead by a comfortable margin. By September 20, they had won 90 out of 150 games, and sported a 61/2-game lead over second-place Cincinnati and St. Louis with a dozen games left to play. But that month, three middle-rung members of the starting rotation began to struggle with injuries and ineffectiveness, causing the club to rely almost exclusively on staff aces Jim Bunning and Chris Short. A loss to Cincinnati on the 21st kicked off a ten-game Philadelphia losing streak and a wild, four-club pennant scramble, with the Phillies finishing second, one game from the championship, won by the Cardinals on the season's last day. That off-season, Widmar was reassigned to his former job as the organization's minor-league pitching instructor. Again, he served three years in that role before returning to the major-league Phillies in 1968 as pitching coach for Mauch, and then Bob Skinner. By the late 1960s, however, the club had reverted to its losing ways and Widmar departed the organization after the 1969 campaign.

In 1970 he joined the Milwaukee Brewers, then in the American League, as minor-league pitching coach. After only one season, the Brewers promoted Widmar to director of player development. Along the way, he briefly filled in as interim manager of Brewer farm teams in both 1971 and 1972. In July of 1973 he came down from the front office to replace Bob Shaw as major-league pitching coach on Del Crandall's staff. After a season and a half, he returned to Milwaukee's farm system as director of player development, then field coordinator of instruction, before leaving the Brewers after a front-office overhaul that followed their 1977 season. In 1978 and 1979, he served as a minor-league pitching instructor for the Baltimore Orioles — once again briefly filling in as a manager, this time for eight games as skipper of the Triple-A Rochester Red Wings in 1978.

In 1980, Widmar was named the Toronto Blue Jays’ pitching coach; he kept the job for the next ten seasons. By 1985, Widmar was guiding a rotation that featured Dave Stieb, Doyle Alexander, Jim Clancy, and Jimmy Key, as the Jays won their first American League East Division title. After spending 1990 as a Blue Jays’ special assignment scout, team management promoted Widmar to special assistant to the vice president and general manager in 1991. He held that assignment through the 2000 season, a period that included Toronto's triumphs in the 1992 and 1993 World Series.

On October 15, 2005, Al Widmar died of colon cancer in Tulsa, Oklahoma, at age 80.

Preceded by Bob Lemon; Larry Shepard	Philadelphia Phillies pitching coach 1962–1964; 1968–1969	Succeeded by Cal McLish; Ray Rippelmeyer
Preceded by Bob Shaw	Milwaukee Brewers pitching coach 1973–1974	Succeeded by Ken McBride
Preceded by Bob Miller	Toronto Blue Jays pitching coach 1980–1989	Succeeded by Galen Cisco
