= Pete Taylor (baseball) =

American baseball player (1927–2003)

- Pitcher
- Born: November 26, 1927; Severn, Maryland, U.S.
- Died: November 17, 2003 (aged 75); Annapolis, Maryland, U.S.
- Batted: Right Threw: Right

MLB debut
- May 2, 1952, for the St. Louis Browns

Last MLB appearance
- May 2, 1952, for the St. Louis Browns

MLB statistics
- Win–loss record: 0–0
- Earned run average: 13.50
- Strikeouts: 0
- Stats at Baseball Reference

Teams
- St. Louis Browns (1952)

Vernon Charles "Pete" Taylor (November 26, 1927 – November 17, 2003) was an American Major League Baseball pitcher who played for the St. Louis Browns in 1952.
