= Alex Garbowski =

American baseball player (1922–2008)

- Pinch runner / Shortstop
- Born: June 25, 1922; Yonkers, New York, U.S.
- Died: June 27, 2008 (aged 86); Putnam Valley, New York, U.S.
- Batted: Right Threw: Right

MLB debut
- April 16, 1952, for the Detroit Tigers

Last MLB appearance
- May 9, 1952, for the Detroit Tigers

MLB statistics
- Games played: 2
- Runs scored: 0
- Stats at Baseball Reference

Teams
- Detroit Tigers (1952)

Alexander Garbowski (June 25, 1922 – June 27, 2008) was an American professional baseball player. Primarily a shortstop during his nine-year career (1946–1954) in minor league baseball, Garbowski appeared in two Major League games for the 1952 Detroit Tigers as a pinch runner. The native of Yonkers, New York, threw and batted right-handed, stood 6 feet 1 inch (1.85 m) tall and weighed 185 pounds (84 kg). He was a veteran of the United States Army who served during World War II.

Garbowski was selected from the unaffiliated Seattle Rainiers of the Pacific Coast League in the 1951 Rule 5 draft and made the Tigers' 28-man, early-season roster out of spring training in 1952. In both his pinch running appearances, he substituted for slow-footed Detroit catcher Matt Batts, on April 16 against the St. Louis Browns and on May 9 against the Chicago White Sox. He recorded no runs scored and no stolen bases in those two games. He did not appear as a fielder on either occasion.

He was sent to Detroit's Triple-A Buffalo Bisons affiliate on May 13 when rosters were cut to 25 men. Garbowski appeared in 944 games as a minor leaguer.
