= Ralph Brickner =

American baseball player (1925–1994)

- Pitcher
- Born: May 2, 1925; Cincinnati, Ohio, U.S.
- Died: May 9, 1994 (aged 69); Bridgetown, Ohio, U.S.
- Batted: Right Threw: Right

MLB debut
- May 4, 1952, for the Boston Red Sox

Last MLB appearance
- September 17, 1952, for the Boston Red Sox

MLB statistics
- Win–loss record: 3–1
- Earned run average: 2.18
- Strikeouts: 9
- Innings pitched: 33
- Stats at Baseball Reference

Teams
- Boston Red Sox (1952)

Ralph Harold Brickner (May 2, 1925 – May 9, 1994) was an American relief pitcher in Major League Baseball who played for the Boston Red Sox in the 1952 season. Nicknamed "Brick", he batted and threw right-handed, stood 6 feet, 31/2 inches (1.92 m) tall and weighed 215 pounds (98 kg). He was born in Cincinnati, and attended Indiana University.

Brickner was a member of the IU Hoosiers baseball team in 1946–47. Signed originally by the Philadelphia Phillies' organization, he was selected by the Red Sox from the independent Portsmouth Cubs of the Piedmont League in the 1950 minor league draft, and reached the Major Leagues on May 2, 1952. He had a successful rookie season with the Red Sox, appearing in 14 games, 13 in relief, and posting a 3–1 win–loss record with one save and an earned run average of only 2.18 with nine strikeouts and 32 hits allowed and 11 bases on balls in 33 innings pitched. But a shoulder injury diagnosed as bursitis curtailed his pitching career. He played his final MLB game on September 17, 1952, and retired after spending 1953 in minor league baseball.

Ralph Brickner died in Bridgetown, Ohio, at the age of 69.
