= Fred Marsh =

American baseball player (1924–2006)

- Third baseman
- Born: January 5, 1924; Valley Falls, Kansas, U.S.
- Died: October 26, 2006 (aged 82); Corry, Pennsylvania, U.S.
- Batted: Right Threw: Right

MLB debut
- April 19, 1949, for the Cleveland Indians

Last MLB appearance
- May 29, 1956, for the Baltimore Orioles

MLB statistics
- Batting average: .239
- Home runs: 10
- Runs batted in: 96
- Stats at Baseball Reference

Teams
- Cleveland Indians (1949); St. Louis Browns (1951–1952); Washington Senators (1952); Chicago White Sox (1953–1954); Baltimore Orioles (1955–1956)

Fred Francis Marsh (January 5, 1924 – October 26, 2006) was an American infielder in Major League Baseball who played in 1949 and from 1951 to 1956 for the Cleveland Indians, St. Louis Browns, Washington Senators, Chicago White Sox and Baltimore Orioles, primarily as a third baseman. Marsh threw and batted right-handed; he was 5 feet 10 inches (1.78 m) tall and weighed 180 pounds (82 kg) pounds.

Born in Valley Falls, Kansas, Marsh was signed originally by the Chicago Cubs in 1942 after graduating from Chicago's Steinmetz High School in 1941. Marsh joined the Navy during World War II and was discharged in 1945.

== Baseball career ==
Marsh made his big league debut on April 19, 1949, at the age of 25 for the Indians, who acquired him from the Cubs' system before the 1947 season. He appeared in only one game that year, as a pinch runner.

Marsh did not play in the major leagues in 1950. In 1951, on April 1, he was traded to the St. Louis Browns with $35,000 for infielders Snuffy Stirnweiss and Merl Combs. Marsh played in 130 games for St. Louis, hitting .243 with four home runs, 21 doubles and 43 RBI in 445 at bats during the only season in which he would in 100 or more games.

Marsh experienced an unusual 1952 campaign. He started the year with the Browns, but on May 12 was traded with Lou Sleater to the Washington Senators for Cass Michaels. Less than one month later, the Senators traded him back to the Browns for Earl Rapp. Marsh had started off poorly as a Brown, hitting only .208 in his first 11 games, thus prompting his trade to the Senators. He fared even worse with Washington, though, appearing in nine games and collecting only one hit in 24 at bats. Marsh's second turn with the Browns that year proved to be much more successful – in 76 games, he hit .287 with two home runs and 26 RBI. Overall that year, he hit .258 with two home runs, 28 RBI and 29 runs scored.

On January 20, 1953, Marsh was traded to the White Sox for Dixie Upright and $25,000. His first year with the White Sox produced only a .200 average in 95 at bats over 67 games. Marsh rebounded in 1954, playing in 62 games and hitting a career-best .306 in 98 at bats. After the season, he was traded with Matt Batts, Don Ferrarese, and Don Johnson to the Baltimore Orioles for Jim Brideweser, Bob Chakales, and Clint Courtney on December 6. The trade reunited Marsh with manager Paul Richards, his skipper in Chicago during the previous two seasons.

In 1955, Marsh played in 89 games for Baltimore, collecting 66 hits in 303 at-bats for a .218 average, although he drew 35 bases on balls. He missed nearly half of the season with a broken elbow and a leg injury. The 1956 campaign would be his last in the big leagues. Marsh collected only three hits in 24 at bats through May 29.

Overall, Marsh hit .239 in 465 games in his career. He collected 296 hits in 1,236 at bats, including 43 doubles, eight triples and ten home runs. Marsh scored 146 runs and drove in 96. He had a stellar stolen base percentage, as he was only caught once in 14 attempts – a 92.9% success rate. He had a good eye at the plate as well, walking 125 times and striking out 171 times. Marsh had a .948 career fielding percentage. Statistically, the player he is most similar to is Ken Hamlin.

After his baseball career, Marsh spent many years as a postal carrier.

After his death in Corry, Pennsylvania at the age of 82, Marsh was buried at Pine Grove Cemetery in Corry.
