= George Bradshaw (baseball) =

American baseball player (1924-1994)

- Catcher
- Born: September 12, 1924; Salisbury, North Carolina, U.S.
- Died: November 4, 1994 (aged 70); Hendersonville, North Carolina, U.S.
- Batted: Right Threw: Right

MLB debut
- August 10, 1952, for the Washington Senators

Last MLB appearance
- September 19, 1952, for the Washington Senators

MLB statistics
- Batting average: .217
- Home runs: 0
- Runs batted in: 6
- Stats at Baseball Reference

Teams
- Washington Senators (1952)

George Thomas Bradshaw (September 12, 1924 – November 4, 1994) was an American professional baseball player, a catcher who appeared in ten Major League games for the 1952 Washington Senators. Born in Salisbury, North Carolina, Bradshaw threw and batted right-handed, stood 6 feet 2 inches (1.88 m) tall and weighed 185 pounds (84 kg).

Bradshaw's professional career began in 1946, and prior to his callup to Washington, took place mostly in the Class D North Carolina State League, where he served as a playing manager from 1950 through mid-1952 and in 1954. The 1952 season saw the 27-year-old Bradshaw rise from Class D to the Class B Charlotte Hornets in mid-year. He batted .324 in the Tri-State League and was recalled to the Senators in August. In his Major League debut, he singled in four at bats against the Philadelphia Athletics and made an error in the field. Six days later, also against Philadelphia, Bradshaw had his best MLB game, with two hits in four at-bats, including a double and three runs batted in.

Bradshaw logged 23 Major League at bats with the Senators; his five hits included two doubles. He returned to the minor leagues in 1953 and 1954, before leaving baseball after nine pro seasons.
