= Harry Schaeffer =

American baseball player (1924-2008)

- Pitcher
- Born: June 23, 1924; Reading, Pennsylvania, U.S.
- Died: July 12, 2008 (aged 84); Shillington, Pennsylvania, U.S.
- Batted: Left Threw: Left

MLB debut
- July 28, 1952, for the New York Yankees

Last MLB appearance
- August 20, 1952, for the New York Yankees

MLB statistics
- Win–loss record: 0–1
- Earned run average: 5.29
- Strikeouts: 15
- Stats at Baseball Reference

Teams
- New York Yankees (1952)

Harry Edward "Lefty" Schaeffer (June 23, 1924 – July 12, 2008) was an American professional baseball pitcher who appeared in five games in Major League Baseball (MLB) for the 1952 New York Yankees.

== Biography ==
A native of Reading, Pennsylvania, Schaeffer batted and threw left-handed; he was listed as 6 feet 2 inches (1.88 m) tall and 175 pounds (79 kg). He served in the United States Navy during World War II and attended the East Stroudsburg University of Pennsylvania.

Schaeffer's nine-year professional career lasted from 1946 through 1954. In his midsummer 1952 trial, the Yankees gave him two opportunities as a starting pitcher. In his MLB debut July 28, he started against the last-place Detroit Tigers and went five innings, allowing five runs, four of them earned. He took the loss for his only MLB decision.

In five MLB games, he worked 17 innings, allowing 18 hits and 18 bases on balls with 15 strikeouts. He compiled a 5.29 career earned run average to go along with his 0–1 won–lost record.

He posted an 84–67 record in minor league baseball.
