= Cass Michaels =

American baseball player (1926–1982)

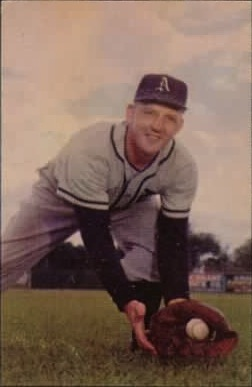
- Michaels circa 1953
- Second baseman
- Born: March 4, 1926; Detroit, Michigan, U.S.
- Died: November 12, 1982 (aged 56); Grosse Pointe, Michigan, U.S.
- Batted: Right Threw: Right

MLB debut
- August 19, 1943, for the Chicago White Sox

Last MLB appearance
- August 27, 1954, for the Chicago White Sox

MLB statistics
- Batting average: .262
- Home runs: 53
- Runs batted in: 501
- Stats at Baseball Reference

Teams
- Chicago White Sox (1943–1950); Washington Senators (1950–1952); St. Louis Browns (1952); Philadelphia Athletics (1952–1953); Chicago White Sox (1954)

Career highlights and awards
- 2× All-Star (1949, 1950)

Cass Michaels (Casimir Eugene Kwietniewski; March 4, 1926 – November 12, 1982) was an American Major League Baseball infielder. He joined the Chicago White Sox at just seventeen years old, and played twelve seasons in the majors until a beanball ended his career at just 28 years old.

== Coming up with the Chisox ==
The Chicago White Sox discovered Kwietniewski playing sandlot ball in Detroit, Michigan, and signed him to a major league contract in 1943 just shy of his seventeenth birthday. When he made his major league debut at third base on August 19, he was the second-youngest player in the American League, behind sixteen-year-old Philadelphia Athletics pitcher Carl Scheib. He went hitless in two games and seven at bats.

He shortened his name to Cass Kwiet for the 1944 season. After a slow start, he was demoted to the Southern Association's Little Rock Travelers for more seasoning. In 27 major league games, mostly played at shortstop, he batted .176 with five runs batted in.

His third big league season brought with it a third name, as he entered spring training 1945 as Cass Michaels, the name he would retain for the rest of his major league career. With Skeeter Webb having been dealt to the Detroit Tigers during the off-season, and Luke Appling serving in the U.S. Army, shortstop belonged to Michaels alone. He emerged as a smooth fielder with an erratic arm; he committed a league leading 47 errors, mostly on throws.

With Appling's return in 1946, Michaels became a utility infielder for the next two seasons. For 1948, 41-year-old Appling was shifted to third, and Michaels was once again the starting shortstop. However, midway through the season, with the team's record sitting at 27–53, 22.5 games back of the Cleveland Indians, manager Ted Lyons decided that it was time for a change.

In the third inning of the first game of a July 21 doubleheader with the Boston Red Sox, Appling was moved back to short, and Michaels was shifted to second base, with Floyd Baker taking over at third. This lineup was retained for the second game, and remained the starting Chisox infield for the rest of the season.

After piloting the Chisox to a 101-loss season and the worst record in major league baseball, Ted Lyons resigned as manager at the close of the season. He was immediately replaced at the helm by Jack Onslow, who stuck with that lineup in 1949.

== All-Star second baseman ==
Michaels soon emerged as one of the top second basemen in the American League. Through 1948, he had a .250 career batting average, eleven home runs and 171 RBIs. At the 1949 All-Star break, however, Michaels was batting .298 with five home runs and 42 RBIs, good enough to be elected the starting American League second baseman. In the first inning, he reached on an error by National League shortstop Pee Wee Reese that scored Eddie Joost with the third run of the inning without an RBI. He also drew a walk to lead off the fifth, but went hitless.

Michaels appeared in all 154 games in 1949, compiling a .308 batting average with 83 RBIs, 73 runs scored and nine triples, all career bests. He was batting .312, and well on his way to another career year and All-Star appearance in 1950, when he, Bob Kuzava and Johnny Ostrowski were traded to the Washington Senators on May 31 for Al Kozar, Eddie Robinson and Ray Scarborough.

Michaels was the sole Washington representative in the 1950 All-Star Game in his old stomping grounds, Comiskey Park. Pinch-hitting for pitcher Vic Raschi to lead off the third inning, he doubled, and later scored on George Kell's sacrifice fly.

== Philadelphia Athletics ==
Michaels batted just .250 following the trade, and was never able to recapture his All-Star form with the Senators. Just shy of his second anniversary in Washington on May 12, 1952, he was traded to the St. Louis Browns for Lou Sleater and Fred Marsh. With Bobby Young manning second base, the Browns shifted Michaels to third. The experiment didn't work, as he committed twelve errors at his new position. His tenure on St. Louis lasted just 55 games before he was placed on waivers, and claimed by the Philadelphia Athletics.

Reunited with manager Jimmy Dykes, under whom Michaels had come up with the White Sox, Michaels returned to second base. He clubbed a career-best twelve home runs in 1953, not enough to prevent the A's from a 95-loss seventh-place finish. After Dykes was unceremonially dismissed at the close of the season, Michaels' contract was sold back to the White Sox.

== Chicago White Sox (second stint) ==
With Nellie Fox now at second base, Michaels was shifted back to third upon his return to Chicago. The White Sox were now a ninety-win third-place ballclub, and Michaels was enjoying playing with a winner for the first time in his career.

On August 27, 1954, the White Sox had already plated five runs in the third inning against Athletics starter Marion Fricano when Michaels stepped into the batter's box. Fricano's first pitch to him struck him in the head. He was carried off the field in a stretcher, and was given Roman Catholic last rites at the hospital he was rushed to in critical condition. He recovered, but the pitch impaired his vision.

After collapsing during spring training in 1955, Michaels retired. Two weeks later, he became a scout for the White Sox in the Detroit area.

== Career stats ==
Games	PA	AB	Runs	Hits	2B	3B	HR	RBI	SB	BB	SO	Avg.	OBP	Fld%
795	5,022	4,367	508	1,142	147	46	53	501	64	566	406	.262	.349	.964

On July 21, 1951, Michaels was in the lineup against his former club following his trade to the Senators. The Chisox were in the thick of the pennant race when the 36–49 Senators came to town. Chicago lost the series opener 2–1 in extra innings on Michaels' RBI, and found themselves already down 4–0 in the third inning of the second game of the set when reliever Luis Aloma entered the game. He intentionally walked the first batter, Pete Runnels, in order to face Michaels with the bases loaded. Michaels belted a grand slam to put it out of reach.

== Personal life ==
During off-seasons, Michaels worked for the Grosse Pointe Department of Public Works, and coached high school basketball. After his playing days, he operated a popular neighborhood bar in Warren, Michigan.

He died in Grosse Pointe, Michigan, on November 12, 1982, at the age of 56. He left behind his wife, Margaret, two daughters and two sons. He is buried in Detroit, Michigan at Mt. Olivet Cemetery.

== See also ==
- List of baseball players who went directly to Major League Baseball
