= George Schmees =

American baseball player (1924–1998)

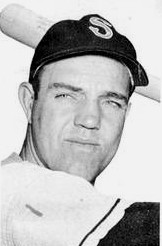
- Schmees with the Seattle Rainiers, circa 1954
- Outfielder / First baseman
- Born: September 6, 1924; Cincinnati, Ohio, U.S.
- Died: October 30, 1998 (aged 74); San Jose, California, U.S.
- Batted: Left Threw: Left

MLB debut
- April 15, 1952, for the St. Louis Browns

Last MLB appearance
- September 28, 1952, for the Boston Red Sox

MLB statistics
- Batting average: .168
- Home runs: 0
- Runs batted in: 6
- Stats at Baseball Reference

Teams
- St. Louis Browns (1952); Boston Red Sox (1952)

George Edward Schmees (September 6, 1924 – October 30, 1998) was an American professional baseball player. Primarily an outfielder, he appeared in Major League Baseball for the St. Louis Browns and Boston Red Sox during the 1952 season. Listed at 6 feet (1.8 m) tall and 190 pounds (86 kg), Schmees batted and threw left-handed. He was born in Cincinnati, Ohio. His nickname was "Rocky".

== Career ==
In a 76-game Major League career, Schmees was a .168 hitter (21-for-125) with 17 runs, six RBI, four doubles, and one triple without home runs. He made 52 fielding appearances at center field (20), right (19), left (9) and first base (4). He also pitched two games (one start) and posted a 3.00 ERA in 6.0 innings of work and did not have a decision.

Schmees then went on to play in the minor leagues as an outfielder for the Seattle Rainiers of the Pacific Coast League from 1953 to 1955.

Schmees died in San Jose, California, at the age of 74.
