= Gordon Goldsberry =

American baseball player (1927–1996)

- First baseman
- Born: August 30, 1927; Sacramento, California, U.S.
- Died: February 23, 1996 (aged 68); Laguna Hills, California, U.S.
- Batted: Left Threw: Left

MLB debut
- April 20, 1949, for the Chicago White Sox

Last MLB appearance
- September 27, 1952, for the St. Louis Browns

MLB statistics
- Batting average: .241
- Home runs: 6
- Runs batted in: 56
- Stats at Baseball Reference

Teams
- Chicago White Sox (1949–1951); St. Louis Browns (1952)

Gordon Frederick Goldsberry (August 30, 1927 – February 23, 1996) was an American professional baseball player, scout and front-office executive. As a player, he was a first baseman who appeared in 217 Major League Baseball games for the Chicago White Sox and St. Louis Browns between 1949 and 1952. He threw and batted left-handed, stood 6 feet (1.8 m) tall and weighed 170 pounds (77 kg).

Born in Sacramento, California, Goldsberry attended the University of California at Los Angeles. His professional playing career lasted 13 seasons (1944–56), and included all or part of seven years spent in the top-level Pacific Coast League for the Hollywood Stars, Los Angeles Angels, Oakland Oaks and Seattle Rainiers. He spent all of the 1950 and 1952 campaigns in the Major Leagues as a backup first baseman, and in his MLB career he collected 123 hits, including six home runs, 20 doubles and seven triples.

After retiring from the field, Goldsberry became a scout for the Los Angeles Dodgers, Chicago Cubs, Milwaukee Brewers (where he signed future Hall of Famer Robin Yount), and Philadelphia Phillies. When Phillies' manager and former farm system director Dallas Green became general manager of the Cubs following the 1981 season, he brought Goldsberry with him as the Cubs' director of player development and scouting. In 1989, Goldsberry joined the Baltimore Orioles as special assistant to the general manager, Roland Hemond. He served in that role until his February 1996 death from an apparent heart attack in Laguna Hills, California, at the age of 68.
