= Bud Black (right-handed pitcher) =

American baseball player (1932–2005)

- Pitcher
- Born: July 9, 1932; St. Louis, Missouri, U.S.
- Died: October 2, 2005 (aged 73); St. Louis, Missouri, U.S.
- Batted: Right Threw: Right

MLB debut
- September 13, 1952, for the Detroit Tigers

Last MLB appearance
- May 12, 1956, for the Detroit Tigers

MLB statistics
- Win–loss record: 2–3
- Earned run average: 4.22
- Strikeouts: 14
- Stats at Baseball Reference

Teams
- Detroit Tigers (1952, 1955–1956)

William Carroll "Bud" Black (July 9, 1932 – October 2, 2005) was an American professional baseball pitcher. He played parts of three seasons in Major League Baseball for the Detroit Tigers.

Black was signed by the St. Louis Browns as an amateur free agent in 1950, then traded to the Tigers in a multi-player deal on August 14, 1952. In all he appeared in 10 games, five as a starter, won two, lost three, pitched 32 innings, and had an earned run average of 4.22.
