= Joe DeMaestri =

American baseball player (1928–2016)

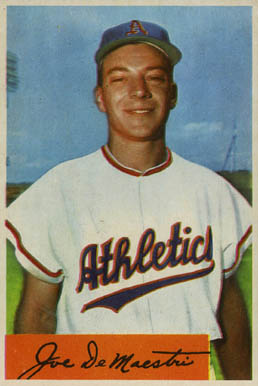
- Shortstop
- Born: December 9, 1928; San Francisco, California, U.S.
- Died: August 26, 2016 (aged 87); San Rafael, California, U.S.
- Batted: Right Threw: Right

MLB debut
- April 19, 1951, for the Chicago White Sox

Last MLB appearance
- September 27, 1961, for the New York Yankees

MLB statistics
- Batting average: .236
- Home runs: 49
- Runs batted in: 281
- Stats at Baseball Reference

Teams
- Chicago White Sox (1951); St. Louis Browns (1952); Philadelphia / Kansas City Athletics (1953–1959); New York Yankees (1960–1961)

Career highlights and awards
- All-Star (1957); World Series champion (1961)

Joseph Paul DeMaestri (December 9, 1928 – August 26, 2016), nicknamed "Froggy", was an American professional baseball player who was a shortstop in Major League Baseball (MLB) for the Chicago White Sox (1951), St. Louis Browns (1952), Philadelphia / Kansas City Athletics (1953–59) and New York Yankees (1960–61). Born in San Francisco, he batted and threw right-handed, stood 6 feet (1.83 m) tall and weighed 170 pounds (77 kg).

DeMaestri graduated a from Tamalpais High School in Mill Valley, California, and began his 15-year professional baseball career in the Boston Red Sox' organization in 1947. He was selected by the White Sox in the 1950 Rule 5 Draft. In an 11-season MLB career, DeMaestri was a .236 hitter with 813 hits, 49 home runs and 281 RBI in 1,121 games played. Defensively, he recorded a .967 fielding percentage. He played 905 of those games with the Athletics and made the American League All-Star team in 1957.

On July 8, 1955, at Briggs Stadium, DeMaestri collected six hits in six at bats in an 11-inning game against the Detroit Tigers. All his hits were singles and he scored two runs, but Detroit won the contest, 11–8.

In December 1959, Demaestri was traded to the New York Yankees in the seven-player deal that famously brought Roger Maris to the Bronx Bombers. When the Yankees won the 1960 American League pennant, he appeared in his first and only World Series, getting into four games and collecting one hit, a single off Joe Gibbon of the Pittsburgh Pirates in the opening contest, in two at bats.

In the eighth inning of Game 7, DeMaestri took over for regular Yankee shortstop Tony Kubek when Kubek was struck in the throat by a bad-hop ground ball hit by Bill Virdon; the play sparked a five-run Pittsburgh rally. However, DeMaestri was off the field when, one inning later, Bill Mazeroski hit his famous walk-off homer against pitcher Ralph Terry. Dale Long had pinch hit for DeMaestri in the top of the ninth, and Clete Boyer had moved from third base to shortstop to take his place on defense.

== See also ==
- List of Major League Baseball single-game hits leaders
