= Walt Dropo =

American baseball player (1923–2010)

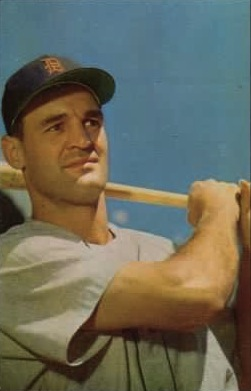
- Dropo, c. 1953
- First baseman
- Born: January 30, 1923; Moosup, Connecticut, U.S.
- Died: December 17, 2010 (aged 87); Peabody, Massachusetts, U.S.
- Batted: Right Threw: Right

MLB debut
- April 19, 1949, for the Boston Red Sox

Last MLB appearance
- May 17, 1961, for the Baltimore Orioles

MLB statistics
- Batting average: .270
- Home runs: 152
- Runs batted in: 704
- Stats at Baseball Reference

Teams
- Boston Red Sox (1949–1952); Detroit Tigers (1952–1954); Chicago White Sox (1955–1958); Cincinnati Redlegs (1958–1959); Baltimore Orioles (1959–1961)

Career highlights and awards
- All-Star (1950); AL Rookie of the Year (1950); AL RBI leader (1950)

Walter Dropo (Serbian: Валтер Дропо, Valter Dropo; January 30, 1923 – December 17, 2010), nicknamed "Moose", was an American college basketball standout and a professional baseball first baseman. During a 13-year career in Major League Baseball, he played for the Boston Red Sox (1949–1952), Detroit Tigers (1952–1954), Chicago White Sox (1955–1958), Cincinnati Redlegs (1958–1959) and Baltimore Orioles (1959–1961).

== Youth ==
Dropo's Serbian parents emigrated from Trebinje, then part of the Kingdom of Yugoslavia (now part of Bosnia and Herzegovina), to start a new life. His father, Sava, worked at the local textile mill while also running their Connecticut family farm. Walter was raised in Moosup, Connecticut, where he played sandlot baseball with his brothers Milton and George, and attended Plainfield High School in the Central Village district of Plainfield, Connecticut, before attending the University of Connecticut.

== College career ==
While at the University of Connecticut Dropo played for the football, basketball and baseball teams. His college career was interrupted by World War II, and he served three years in the Army, including combat in Europe. Dropo left UConn as the school's all-time leading scorer in basketball. Dropo was drafted in the first round of the 1947 BAA Draft by the Providence Steamrollers with the fourth overall pick. Dropo was also drafted 74th overall by the Chicago Bears in the ninth round of the 1946 NFL draft.

== Professional career ==
Listed at 6'5", 220 lb (100 kg), Walter turned down offers from the Bears and the Providence Steamrollers, in order to sign with the Red Sox as an amateur free agent in 1947. He debuted on April 19, 1949, and in 11 games batted .146 (6-for-41). Before that, he played first base briefly for the Red Sox farm team the Birmingham, Ala. Barons of the Southern Association double-A League.

In 1950, Dropo led the league in total bases (326) and tied (with teammate Vern Stephens) for the league lead in RBIs (144), while batting .322 and hitting 34 home runs, (second only to Al Rosen 37). In addition, his .583 slugging percentage and 70 extra base hits were second only to the .585 – 75 of Joe DiMaggio, and his .961 OPS finished third in the league, after Larry Doby (.986) and DiMaggio (.979). When Dropo was named the starting first baseman for the American League team in the 1950 Major League Baseball All-Star Game, he became only the fifth rookie player in MLB history to start in an All-Star Game after Joe DiMaggio (1936), Dick Wakefield (1943), Richie Ashburn (1948) and Eddie Kazak (1949). Dropo won the American League Rookie of the Year award in 1950, becoming the first Red Sox player to receive the award. In winning the award, he beat future Hall of Famer Whitey Ford, who finished second in balloting. Furthermore, Dropo finished sixth in the American League Most Valuable Player award.

In 1951, Dropo fractured his right wrist and never had another season the equal of his 1950 campaign. After another one-plus season, he was traded to Detroit on June 3, 1952. After being traded, he collected 12 consecutive hits to tie the MLB record. Included in the streak was a 5-for-5 game against the Yankees (July 14) and a 4-for-4 performance in the first game of a doubleheader against Washington (July 15). In the second game, he went 4-for-5, hitting on his first three at bats and popping out on his fourth at bat on the 7th inning, matching an American League record of 15 hits in four games. In that season, he hit a combined 29 home runs and 97 RBIs, but would never again hit over 19 homers (1955) or bat over .281 (1954).

In a 13-season career, Dropo batted .270 (1,113-for-4,124) with 152 home runs, 704 RBIs, 478 runs, 168 doubles, 22 triples and five stolen bases in 1,288 games. Defensively, in 1,174 games as a first baseman, he compiled a .992 fielding percentage.

== Later life and death ==
After baseball, Dropo worked in insurance, investment brokering, the Dropo family fireworks business, and in real estate development. He was long active in University of Connecticut alumni affairs, and his family established the university's first fully endowed scholarship.

Dropo died of natural causes on December 17, 2010, at the age of 87. His funeral service was held at the Serbian Orthodox Church he helped found at 41 Alewife Brook Parkway, Cambridge, Massachusetts. He was laid to rest at Evergreen Cemetery in Plainfield, Connecticut.

== See also ==
- List of Major League Baseball individual streaks
- List of Major League Baseball annual runs batted in leaders
