= Dick Littlefield =

American baseball player (1926–1997)

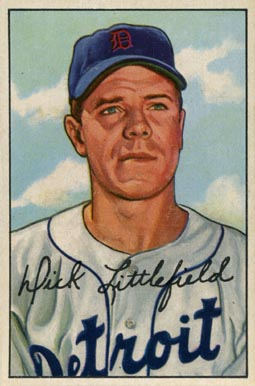
- Pitcher
- Born: March 18, 1926; Detroit, Michigan, U.S.
- Died: November 20, 1997 (aged 71); Detroit, Michigan, U.S.
- Batted: Left Threw: Left

MLB debut
- July 7, 1950, for the Boston Red Sox

Last MLB appearance
- May 30, 1958, for the Milwaukee Braves

MLB statistics
- Win–loss record: 33–54
- Earned run average: 4.71
- Strikeouts: 495
- Stats at Baseball Reference

Teams
- Boston Red Sox (1950); Chicago White Sox (1951); Detroit Tigers (1952); St. Louis Browns / Baltimore Orioles (1952–1954); Pittsburgh Pirates (1954–1956); St. Louis Cardinals (1956); New York Giants (1956); Chicago Cubs (1957); Milwaukee Braves (1958)

Richard Bernard Littlefield (March 18, 1926 – November 20, 1997) was an American Major League Baseball pitcher with the Boston Red Sox, Chicago White Sox, Detroit Tigers, St. Louis Browns / Baltimore Orioles, Pittsburgh Pirates, St. Louis Cardinals, New York Giants, Chicago Cubs and the Milwaukee Braves between 1950 and 1958. He batted and threw left-handed, and was listed as 6 feet (1.8 m) tall and 180 pounds (82 kg). He was born and died in Detroit.

== Career ==
He was traded (along with $30,000 cash) by the New York Giants to the Brooklyn Dodgers for Jackie Robinson on December 13, 1956. However, Robinson refused to report to the Giants, choosing instead to retire, and the trade was voided. Moreover, Littlefield was known as one of the most well-traveled and frequently-traded players prior to the free agency era, appearing for nine of the 16 MLB franchises in existence before 1961—ten, including his brief assignment to the Dodgers' winter roster during the 1956–57 offseason.

Littlefield served in the United States Navy during World War II before embarking on his 17-season (1946–62) professional baseball career. During his nine years in the majors, he posted a 33–54 record and a 4.71 earned run average in 243 games and 7612/3 innings pitched, allowing 750 hits and 413 bases on balls, with 495 strikeouts. He made 83 starts and notched 16 complete games and two shutouts. He earned nine saves as a relief pitcher.
