= 1952 Major League Baseball season =

1952 MLB season
- League: American League (AL); National League (NL)
- Sport: Baseball
- Duration: Regular season: April 15 – September 28, 1952; World Series: October 1–7, 1952
- Games: 154
- Teams: 16 (8 per league)

Regular season
- Season MVP: AL: Bobby Shantz (PHA); NL: Hank Sauer (CHC)
- AL champions: New York Yankees
- AL runners-up: Cleveland Indians
- NL champions: Brooklyn Dodgers
- NL runners-up: New York Giants

World Series
- Champions: New York Yankees
- Runners-up: Brooklyn Dodgers
- Finals MVP: Johnny Mize (NYY)

MLB seasons
- ← 1951 1953 →

Locations of teams for the 1942–1953 American League seasons
American League
Locations of teams for the 1943–1952 National League seasons
National League

The 1952 major league baseball season began on April 15, 1952. The regular season ended on September 28, with the Brooklyn Dodgers and New York Yankees as the regular season champions of the National League and American League, respectively. The postseason began with Game 1 of the 49th World Series on October 1 and ended with Game 7 on October 7. In the fourth iteration of this Subway Series World Series matchup, the Yankees defeated the Dodgers, four games to three, capturing their 15th championship in franchise history, and their fourth in a five-run World Series. This was the fourth World Series between the two teams.

The 19th All-Star Game was held on July 8 at Shibe Park in Philadelphia, Pennsylvania, hosted by the Philadelphia Phillies. The National League won, 3–2. To date, it was the only All-Star Game to be called early due to rain.

The 1952 season would prove to be the final season of a 50-season run which saw no team relocate from one city to another, as the Boston Braves would move to Milwaukee, Wisconsin the following year as the Milwaukee Braves. 1952 would also be Ford Frick's first full year as commissioner.

== Schedule ==
The 1952 schedule consisted of 154 games for all teams in the American League and National League, each of which had eight teams. Each team was scheduled to play 22 games against the other seven teams of their respective league. This continued the format put in place since the 1904 season (except for 1919) and would be used until 1961 in the American League and 1962 in the National League.

Opening Day took place on April 15, featuring 12 teams. The final day of the scheduled regular season was on September 28, which saw all sixteen teams play, continuing the trend from 1946. The World Series took place between October 1 and October 7.

== Rule changes ==
The 1952 season saw the following rule changes:

- The Open Classification level was created specifically for the Pacific Coast League (PCL), a level of play between Triple-A and major-league (this level of play would be eliminated following the PCL's reversion to Triple-A in 1958). Unlike other levels of the minor league, having an Open Classification came with the following stipulations:
  - Players at the Open Classification would be excluded from the draft if they waived their selection rights or had less than five years of service.
  - The draft price for an Open Classification player would be $15,000 (equivalent to $182,000 in 2025) instead of the $10,000 (equivalent to $121,000 in 2025) price tag on Triple-A players.
  - To achieve Open Classification, a league had to show an aggregate population of 10 million, have an aggregate park capacity of 120,000, and average a paid attendance of 2,250,000 for the preceding five years.
- An 11-step process was established for a league to reach major-league status:
  1. Any group of eight teams mutually agreeing to all requirements and responsibilities as provided under the proposed regulations must apply to the major-league Executive Council. The eight teams are responsible for all necessary territorial indemnities and financial obligations.
  2. The teams must present with their application complete data establishing their ability to meet the requirements for advanced status, including a full statement of stock ownership, financial ability, and character, both for the group and its individual members.
  3. The proposed league shall show an aggregate population of 15 million in the eight cities.
  4. Each team shall have a potential capacity of at least 25,000 in its ballpark.
  5. They shall have had an average total paid attendance of 3.5 million over a three-year period preceding the application.
  6. They shall provide a balanced schedule of at least 154 games.
  7. They shall adopt the major-league minimum-salary agreement with no maximum salary limitations.
  8. They will become parties to the Major League Agreement and the Major-Minor League Agreement.
  9. They will accept the uniform major-league player’s contract and agreement.
  10. They will join in the players’ pension plan or adopt a comparable plan.
  11. They shall apply for major-league status at least six months before the meeting at which the application must be considered, and at least 10 months before the opening of the season in which they hope to participate under major-league status.
- A new rule regarding high-school players was approved. Players could be contacted at any time, but could not sign until their high-school eligibility expired. Any student who dropped out of high school before their eligibility expired must sit out one year before being eligible to sign. Previously, the rules regarding high-school players was that a player could not be signed until they had received their degree or their class graduated was eliminated.
- Major-league players now have the right to have a liaison in the commissioner's office. The liaison would be a full-time representative and serve as a clearinghouse for any player problems that might arise.

== Teams ==
| League | Team | City | Ballpark | Capacity | Manager |
|---|---|---|---|---|---|
| American League | Boston Red Sox | Boston, Massachusetts | Fenway Park | 35,200 | Lou Boudreau |
| American League | Chicago White Sox | Chicago, Illinois | Comiskey Park | 47,400 | Paul Richards |
| American League | Cleveland Indians | Cleveland, Ohio | Cleveland Stadium | 73,811 | Al López |
| American League | Detroit Tigers | Detroit, Michigan | Briggs Stadium | 58,000 | Red Rolfe |
| American League | Detroit Tigers | Detroit, Michigan | Briggs Stadium | 58,000 | Fred Hutchinson |
| American League | New York Yankees | New York, New York | Yankee Stadium | 67,000 | Casey Stengel |
| American League | Philadelphia Athletics | Philadelphia, Pennsylvania | Shibe Park | 33,166 | Jimmy Dykes |
| American League | St. Louis Browns | St. Louis, Missouri | Sportsman's Park | 34,000 | Rogers Hornsby |
| American League | St. Louis Browns | St. Louis, Missouri | Sportsman's Park | 34,000 | Marty Marion |
| American League | Washington Senators | Washington, D.C. | Griffith Stadium | 29,731 | Bucky Walters |
| National League | Boston Braves | Boston, Massachusetts | Braves Field | 37,106 | Tommy Holmes |
| National League | Boston Braves | Boston, Massachusetts | Braves Field | 37,106 | Charlie Grimm |
| National League | Brooklyn Dodgers | New York, New York | Ebbets Field | 32,111 | Chuck Dressen |
| National League | Chicago Cubs | Chicago, Illinois | Wrigley Field | 36,755 | Phil Cavarretta |
| National League | Cincinnati Reds | Cincinnati, Ohio | Crosley Field | 29,980 | Luke Sewell |
| National League | Cincinnati Reds | Cincinnati, Ohio | Crosley Field | 29,980 | Rogers Hornsby |
| National League | New York Giants | New York, New York | Polo Grounds | 54,500 | Leo Durocher |
| National League | Philadelphia Phillies | Philadelphia, Pennsylvania | Shibe Park | 33,166 | Eddie Sawyer |
| National League | Philadelphia Phillies | Philadelphia, Pennsylvania | Shibe Park | 33,166 | Steve O'Neill |
| National League | Pittsburgh Pirates | Pittsburgh, Pennsylvania | Forbes Field | 33,730 | Billy Meyer |
| National League | St. Louis Cardinals | St. Louis, Missouri | Sportsman's Park | 34,000 | Eddie Stanky |

== Standings ==
=== American League ===
American League
| Team | W | L | Pct. | GB | Home | Road |
|---|---|---|---|---|---|---|
| New York Yankees | 95 | 59 | .617 | — | 49‍–‍28 | 46‍–‍31 |
| Cleveland Indians | 93 | 61 | .604 | 2 | 49‍–‍28 | 44‍–‍33 |
| Chicago White Sox | 81 | 73 | .526 | 14 | 44‍–‍33 | 37‍–‍40 |
| Philadelphia Athletics | 79 | 75 | .513 | 16 | 45‍–‍32 | 34‍–‍43 |
| Washington Senators | 78 | 76 | .506 | 17 | 42‍–‍35 | 36‍–‍41 |
| Boston Red Sox | 76 | 78 | .494 | 19 | 50‍–‍27 | 26‍–‍51 |
| St. Louis Browns | 64 | 90 | .416 | 31 | 42‍–‍35 | 22‍–‍55 |
| Detroit Tigers | 50 | 104 | .325 | 45 | 32‍–‍45 | 18‍–‍59 |

=== National League ===
National League
| Team | W | L | Pct. | GB | Home | Road |
|---|---|---|---|---|---|---|
| Brooklyn Dodgers | 96 | 57 | .627 | — | 45‍–‍33 | 51‍–‍24 |
| New York Giants | 92 | 62 | .597 | 4½ | 50‍–‍27 | 42‍–‍35 |
| St. Louis Cardinals | 88 | 66 | .571 | 8½ | 48‍–‍29 | 40‍–‍37 |
| Philadelphia Phillies | 87 | 67 | .565 | 9½ | 47‍–‍29 | 40‍–‍38 |
| Chicago Cubs | 77 | 77 | .500 | 19½ | 42‍–‍35 | 35‍–‍42 |
| Cincinnati Reds | 69 | 85 | .448 | 27½ | 38‍–‍39 | 31‍–‍46 |
| Boston Braves | 64 | 89 | .418 | 32 | 31‍–‍45 | 33‍–‍44 |
| Pittsburgh Pirates | 42 | 112 | .273 | 54½ | 23‍–‍54 | 19‍–‍58 |

=== Tie games ===
8 tie games (5 in AL, 3 in NL), which are not factored into winning percentage or games behind (and were often replayed again) occurred throughout the season.

==== American League ====
- Chicago White Sox, 2
- Cleveland Indians, 1
- Detroit Tigers, 2
- Philadelphia Athletics, 1
- St. Louis Browns, 1
- Washington Senators, 3

==== National League ====
- Boston Braves, 2
- Brooklyn Dodgers, 2
- Chicago Cubs, 1
- Pittsburgh Pirates, 1

== Postseason ==
The postseason began on October 1 and ended on October 7 with the New York Yankees defeating the Brooklyn Dodgers in the 1952 World Series in seven games.

=== Bracket ===
| World Series |
| AL | New York Yankees | 4 |
| NL | Brooklyn Dodgers | 3 |

== Managerial changes ==
=== Off-season ===
| Team | Former Manager | New Manager |
|---|---|---|
| Boston Red Sox | Steve O'Neill | Lou Boudreau |
| St. Louis Browns | Zack Taylor | Rogers Hornsby |
| St. Louis Cardinals | Marty Marion | Eddie Stanky |

=== In-season ===
| Team | Former Manager | New Manager |
|---|---|---|
| Boston Braves | Tommy Holmes | Charlie Grimm |
| Cincinnati Reds | Luke Sewell | Rogers Hornsby |
| Detroit Tigers | Red Rolfe | Fred Hutchinson |
| Philadelphia Phillies | Eddie Sawyer | Steve O'Neill |
| St. Louis Browns | Rogers Hornsby | Marty Marion |

== League leaders ==
=== American League ===
Hitting leaders
| Stat | Player | Total |
|---|---|---|
| AVG | Ferris Fain (PHA) | .327 |
| OPS | Mickey Mantle (NYY) | .924 |
| HR | Larry Doby (CLE) | 32 |
| RBI | Al Rosen (CLE) | 105 |
| R | Larry Doby (CLE) | 104 |
| H | Nellie Fox (CWS) | 192 |
| SB | Minnie Miñoso (CWS) | 22 |

Pitching leaders
| Stat | Player | Total |
|---|---|---|
| W | Bobby Shantz (PHA) | 24 |
| L | Art Houtteman (DET) | 20 |
| ERA | Allie Reynolds (NYY) | 2.06 |
| K | Allie Reynolds (NYY) | 160 |
| IP | Bob Lemon (CLE) | 309.2 |
| SV | Harry Dorish (CWS) | 11 |
| WHIP | Bobby Shantz (PHA) | 1.048 |

=== National League ===
Hitting leaders
| Stat | Player | Total |
|---|---|---|
| AVG | Stan Musial (STL) | .336 |
| OPS | Stan Musial (STL) | .970 |
| HR | Ralph Kiner (PIT); Hank Sauer (CHC) | 37 |
| RBI | Hank Sauer (CHC) | 121 |
| R | Solly Hemus (STL); Stan Musial (STL) | 105 |
| H | Stan Musial (STL) | 194 |
| SB | Pee Wee Reese (BRO) | 30 |

Pitching leaders
| Stat | Player | Total |
|---|---|---|
| W | Robin Roberts (PHI) | 28 |
| L | Murry Dickson (PIT) | 21 |
| ERA | Hoyt Wilhelm (NYG) | 2.43 |
| K | Warren Spahn (BSN) | 183 |
| IP | Robin Roberts (PHI) | 330.0 |
| SV | Al Brazle (STL) | 16 |
| WHIP | Warren Hacker (CHC) | 0.946 |

== Milestones ==
=== Batters ===
==== Cycles ====
- Larry Doby (CLE):
  - Doby hit for his first cycle and fourth in franchise history, on June 4 against the Boston Red Sox.

=== Pitchers ===
==== No-hitters ====
- Virgil Trucks (DET):
  - Truck threw his first career no-hitter and second no-hitter in franchise history, by defeating the Washington Senators 1–0 on May 15. Trucks walked one, hit two by pitch, and struck out seven.
  - Trucks threw his second career no-hitter and third no-hitter in franchise history, by defeating the New York Yankees 1–0 on August 25. Trucks walked one and struck out eight.
- Carl Erskine (BRO):
  - Erskine threw his first career no-hitter and 11th no-hitter in franchise history, by defeating the Chicago Cubs 5–0 on June 19. Erskine walked one and struck out one, throwing 63 strikes on 103 pitches.

=== Miscellaneous ===
- Brooklyn Dodgers:
  - Set a modern (1900–present) major league record for most runs scored in the first inning, by scoring 15 runs against the Cincinnati Reds on May 21.

== Awards and honors ==
=== Regular season ===
Baseball Writers' Association of America Awards
| BBWAA Award | National League | American League |
|---|---|---|
| Rookie of the Year | Joe Black (BRO) | Harry Byrd (PHA) |
| Most Valuable Player | Hank Sauer (CHC) | Bobby Shantz (PHA) |
| Babe Ruth Award (World Series MVP) | — | Johnny Mize (NYY) |

=== Other awards ===
The Sporting News Awards
| Award | National League | American League |
|---|---|---|
| Player of the Year | Robin Roberts (PHI) | — |
| Pitcher of the Year | Robin Roberts (PHI) | Bobby Shantz (CLE) |
| Rookie of the Year | Joe Black (BRO) | Clint Courtney (SLB) |
| Manager of the Year | Eddie Stanky (STL) | — |
| Executive of the Year | — | George Weiss (NYY) |

=== Baseball Hall of Fame ===
- Harry Heilmann
- Paul Waner

== Home field attendance ==
| Team name | Wins | %± | Home attendance | %± | Per game |
|---|---|---|---|---|---|
| New York Yankees | 95 | −3.1% | 1,629,665 | −16.4% | 21,164 |
| Cleveland Indians | 93 | 0.0% | 1,444,607 | −15.3% | 18,761 |
| Chicago White Sox | 81 | 0.0% | 1,231,675 | −7.3% | 15,591 |
| Boston Red Sox | 76 | −12.6% | 1,115,750 | −15.0% | 14,490 |
| Brooklyn Dodgers | 96 | −1.0% | 1,088,704 | −15.1% | 13,609 |
| Detroit Tigers | 50 | −31.5% | 1,026,846 | −9.3% | 13,336 |
| Chicago Cubs | 77 | 24.2% | 1,024,826 | 14.6% | 13,309 |
| New York Giants | 92 | −6.1% | 984,940 | −7.0% | 12,791 |
| St. Louis Cardinals | 88 | 8.6% | 913,113 | −9.9% | 11,859 |
| Philadelphia Phillies | 87 | 19.2% | 755,417 | −19.4% | 9,940 |
| Washington Senators | 78 | 25.8% | 699,457 | 0.6% | 8,967 |
| Pittsburgh Pirates | 42 | −34.4% | 686,673 | −30.0% | 8,918 |
| Philadelphia Athletics | 79 | 12.9% | 627,100 | 34.7% | 8,040 |
| Cincinnati Reds | 69 | 1.5% | 604,197 | 2.7% | 7,847 |
| St. Louis Browns | 64 | 23.1% | 518,796 | 76.6% | 6,651 |
| Boston Braves | 64 | −15.8% | 281,278 | −42.3% | 3,653 |

== Venues ==
The Boston Braves would play their last game at Braves Field on September 21 against the Brooklyn Dodgers, relocating to Milwaukee, Wisconsin at Milwaukee County Stadium as the Milwaukee Braves for the start of the 1953 season.

== Retired numbers ==
- Honus Wagner had his No. 33 retired by the Pittsburgh Pirates on February 16. This was the first number retired by the team.
- Joe DiMaggio had his No. 5 retired by the New York Yankees on April 18. This was the third number retired by the team.

== See also ==
- 1952 in baseball (Events, Movies, Births, Deaths)
- 1952 All-American Girls Professional Baseball League season
- 1952 Nippon Professional Baseball season
