= 1952 Philadelphia Athletics season =

1952 Philadelphia Athletics
- League: American League
- Ballpark: Shibe Park
- City: Philadelphia
- Record: 79–75 (.513)
- League place: 4th
- Owners: Earle Mack & Roy Mack
- General managers: Arthur Ehlers
- Managers: Jimmy Dykes
- Television: WPTZ/WCAU/WFIL (By Saam, Claude Haring)
- Radio: WIBG (By Saam, Claude Haring, George Walsh)

The 1952 Philadelphia Athletics season saw the A's finish fourth and in the first division of the American League with a record of 79 wins and 75 losses. They finished 16 games behind the eventual World Series champion New York Yankees. Managed by Jimmy Dykes, they attracted 627,100 fans to Shibe Park, seventh among the Junior Circuit's eight teams.

The Athletics' 1952 campaign would be their final winning season in Philadelphia; only two years later, in November 1954, the franchise would move to Kansas City; 1952 would also be the Athletics' only winning season of the 1950s. They would have to wait until 1968, their first season in Oakland, for their next winning record.

== Offseason ==
- January 21, 1952: Wally Moses was released as an active player by the Athletics; he then joined the club's coaching staff.

== Regular season ==
The Athletics improved nine games from their 70–84 record in 1951 and improved to fourth in the American League. A Most Valuable Player season was turned in by left-handed pitcher Bobby Shantz and the A.L. batting championship was won by Ferris Fain with a .320 average.

Gus Zernial hit 29 home runs and drove in 100 RBI while Eddie Joost chipped in 20 HRs and 75 RBI. However, outside Shantz, who went 24–7, their best pitcher record-wise was Harry Byrd, with a 15–15 record.

=== Season standings ===
American League
Team	W	L	Pct.	GB	Home	Road
New York Yankees	95	59	.617	—	49‍–‍28	46‍–‍31
Cleveland Indians	93	61	.604	2	49‍–‍28	44‍–‍33
Chicago White Sox	81	73	.526	14	44‍–‍33	37‍–‍40
Philadelphia Athletics	79	75	.513	16	45‍–‍32	34‍–‍43
Washington Senators	78	76	.506	17	42‍–‍35	36‍–‍41
Boston Red Sox	76	78	.494	19	50‍–‍27	26‍–‍51
St. Louis Browns	64	90	.416	31	42‍–‍35	22‍–‍55
Detroit Tigers	50	104	.325	45	32‍–‍45	18‍–‍59

=== Record vs. opponents ===
1952 American League record Sources:
Team	BOS	CWS	CLE	DET	NYY	PHA	SLB	WSH
Boston	—	12–10	9–13	16–6	8–14	12–10	11–11	8–14
Chicago	10–12	—	8–14–1	17–5	8–14	11–11	14–8	13–9–1
Cleveland	13–9	14–8–1	—	16–6	10–12	13–9	15–7	12–10
Detroit	6–16	5–17	6–16	—	9–13	5–17–1	8–14	11–11–1
New York	14–8	14–8	12–10	13–9	—	13–9	14–8	15–7
Philadelphia	10–12	11–11	9–13	17–5–1	9–13	—	14–8	9–13
St. Louis	11–11	8–14	7–15	14–8	8–14	8–14	—	8–14–1
Washington	14–8	9–13–1	10–12	11–11–1	7–15	13–9	14–8–1	—

=== Notable transactions ===
- May 10, 1952: Marion Fricano was purchased by the Athletics from the Brooklyn Dodgers.

=== Roster ===
1952 Philadelphia Athletics
Roster
Pitchers: 38 Charlie Bishop; 38 Harry Byrd; 25 Dick Fowler; 37 Marion Fricano; 23 Bob Hooper; 18 Tex Hoyle; 22 Alex Kellner; 21 Walt Kellner; 37 Johnny Kucab; 26 Morrie Martin; 36 Len Matarazzo; 20 Bobo Newsom; 24 Carl Scheib; 30 Bobby Shantz; 34 Ed Wright; 21 Sam Zoldak	Catchers: 9 Joe Astroth; 14 Ray Murray; 15 Joe Tipton; Infielders: 3 Hal Bevan; 8 Ferris Fain; 4 Tom Hamilton; 11 Billy Hitchcock; 1 Eddie Joost; 2 Skeeter Kell; 16 Jack Littrell; 5 Hank Majeski; 5 Cass Michaels; 16 Sherry Robertson; 12 Pete Suder	Outfielders: 7 Allie Clark; 17 Dave Philley; 6 Kite Thomas; 10 Elmer Valo; 19 Gus Zernial	Manager: 35 Jimmy Dykes; Coaches: 32 Chief Bender; 33 Bing Miller; 28 Wally Moses; 29 Tom Oliver

== Player stats ==
=== Batting ===
==== Starters by position ====
Note: Pos = Position; G = Games played; AB = At bats; H = Hits; Avg. = Batting average; HR = Home runs; RBI = Runs batted in

Pos	Player	G	AB	H	Avg.	HR	RBI
C	Joe Astroth	104	337	84	.249	1	36
1B	Ferris Fain	145	538	176	.327	2	59
2B	Skeeter Kell	75	213	47	.221	0	17
SS	Eddie Joost	146	540	132	.244	20	75
3B	Billy Hitchcock	119	407	100	.246	1	56
OF	Gus Zernial	145	549	144	.262	29	100
OF	Elmer Valo	129	388	109	.281	5	47
OF	Dave Philley	151	586	154	.263	7	71

==== Other batters ====
Note: G = Games played; AB = At bats; H = Hits; Avg. = Batting average; HR = Home runs; RBI = Runs batted in

Player	G	AB	H	Avg.	HR	RBI
Pete Suder	74	228	55	.241	1	20
Cass Michaels	55	200	50	.250	1	18
Allie Clark	71	186	51	.274	7	29
Ray Murray	44	136	28	.206	1	10
Hank Majeski	34	117	30	.256	2	20
Kite Thomas	75	116	29	.250	6	18
Joe Tipton	23	68	13	.191	3	8
Sherry Robertson	43	60	12	.200	0	5
Hal Bevan	8	17	6	.353	0	4
Tom Hamilton	9	10	2	.200	0	1
Jack Littrell	4	2	0	.000	0	0

=== Pitching ===
==== Starting pitchers ====
Note: G = Games pitched; IP = Innings pitched; W = Wins; L = Losses; ERA = Earned run average; SO = Strikeouts

Player	G	IP	W	L	ERA	SO
Bobby Shantz	33	279.2	24	7	2.48	152
Alex Kellner	34	231.1	12	14	4.36	105
Harry Byrd	37	228.1	15	15	3.31	116
Charlie Bishop	6	30.2	2	2	6.46	17
Morrie Martin	5	25.1	0	2	6.39	13

==== Other pitchers ====
Note: G = Games pitched; IP = Innings pitched; W = Wins; L = Losses; ERA = Earned run average; SO = Strikeouts

Player	G	IP	W	L	ERA	SO
Carl Scheib	30	158.0	11	7	4.39	42
Bob Hooper	43	144.1	8	15	5.18	40
Bobo Newsom	14	47.2	3	3	3.59	22
Charlie Bishop	6	30.2	2	2	6.46	17

==== Relief pitchers ====
Note: G = Games pitched; W = Wins; L = Losses; SV = Saves; ERA = Earned run average; SO = Strikeouts

Player	G	W	L	SV	ERA	SO
Johnny Kucab	25	0	1	2	5.26	17
Ed Wright	24	2	1	1	6.53	9
Dick Fowler	18	1	2	0	6.44	14
Tex Hoyle	3	0	0	0	27.00	1
Marion Fricano	2	0	0	0	1.80	0
Walt Kellner	1	0	0	0	6.75	2
Len Matarazzo	1	0	0	0	0.00	0

== Awards and honors ==
- Bobby Shantz, American League MVP

== Farm system ==
Level	Team	League	Manager
AAA	Ottawa Athletics	International League	Frank Skaff
A	Savannah Indians	Sally League	George Staller
A	Lincoln Athletics	Western League	Les Bell
B	Fayetteville Athletics	Carolina League	Ducky Detweiler and Red Norris
B	Harrisburg Senators	Interstate League	Buck Etchison and Woody Wheaton
C	St. Hyacinthe A's	Provincial League	John Sosh
D	Cordele A's	Georgia–Florida League	Norm Wilson
D	Lexington Indians	North Carolina State League	Bob Deese, Ducky Detweiler, Carl Campbell and Cliff Bolton
D	Corning Athletics	PONY League	Joe Rullo
