= 1951 Cleveland Indians season =

1951 Cleveland Indians
- League: American League
- Ballpark: Cleveland Municipal Stadium
- City: Cleveland, Ohio
- Owners: Ellis Ryan
- General managers: Hank Greenberg
- Managers: Al López
- Television: WXEL (Hal Newell)
- Radio: WERE (Jack Graney, Jimmy Dudley)

The 1951 Cleveland Indians season was a season in American baseball. The team finished second in the American League with a record of 93–61, 5 games behind the New York Yankees.

== Offseason ==
- March 20, 1951: Grant Dunlap was purchased from the Indians by the Shreveport Sports.

== Regular season ==
=== Season standings ===
American League
Team	W	L	Pct.	GB	Home	Road
New York Yankees	98	56	.636	—	56‍–‍22	42‍–‍34
Cleveland Indians	93	61	.604	5	53‍–‍24	40‍–‍37
Boston Red Sox	87	67	.565	11	50‍–‍25	37‍–‍42
Chicago White Sox	81	73	.526	17	39‍–‍38	42‍–‍35
Detroit Tigers	73	81	.474	25	36‍–‍41	37‍–‍40
Philadelphia Athletics	70	84	.455	28	38‍–‍41	32‍–‍43
Washington Senators	62	92	.403	36	32‍–‍44	30‍–‍48
St. Louis Browns	52	102	.338	46	24‍–‍53	28‍–‍49

=== Record vs. opponents ===
1951 American League record Sources:
Team	BOS	CWS	CLE	DET	NYY	PHA	SLB	WSH
Boston	—	11–11	8–14	12–10	11–11	15–7	15–7	15–7
Chicago	11–11	—	12–10–1	12–10	8–14	9–13	15–7	14–8
Cleveland	14–8	10–12–1	—	17–5	7–15	16–6	16–6	13–9
Detroit	10–12	10–12	5–17	—	10–12	13–9	12–10	13–9
New York	11–11	14–8	15–7	12–10	—	13–9	17–5	16–6
Philadelphia	7–15	13–9	6–16	9–13	9–13	—	14–8	12–10
St. Louis	7–15	7–15	6–16	10–12	5–17	8–14	—	9–13
Washington	7–15	8–14	9–13	9–13	6–16	10–12	13–9	—

=== Notable transactions ===
- April 30, 1951: Minnie Miñoso was traded by the Indians to the Chicago White Sox, and Sam Zoldak and Ray Murray were traded by the Indians to the Philadelphia Athletics as part of a three-team trade. The Athletics sent Lou Brissie to the Indians, and sent Paul Lehner to the White Sox. The White Sox sent Gus Zernial and Dave Philley to the Athletics.

=== Roster ===
1951 Cleveland Indians
Roster
Pitchers: 12 Lou Brissie; 29 Bob Chakales; 28 Jerry Fahr; 19 Bob Feller; 25 Mike Garcia; 27 Steve Gromek; 18 Bubba Harris; 36 Sam Jones; 21 Bob Lemon; 26 Dick Rozek; 22 Johnny Vander Meer; 24 Early Wynn; 17 George Zuverink	Catchers: 4 Jim Hegan; 12 Ray Murray; 23 Hal Naragon; 15 Birdie Tebbetts; Infielders: 1 Bobby Ávila; 8 Ray Boone; 11 Merl Combs; 9 Luke Easter; 6 Minnie Miñoso; 7 Al Rosen; 5 Snuffy Stirnweiss	Outfielders: 31 Sam Chapman; 31 Allie Clark; 14 Larry Doby; 33 Bob Kennedy; 38 Paul Lehner; 20 Clarence Maddern; 32 Barney McCosky; 3 Dale Mitchell; 35 Harry Simpson; Other players: 2 Doug Hansen; 2 Lou Klein; 32 Milt Nielsen; 38 Thurman Tucker	Manager: 10 Al López; Coaches: 42 Jake Flowers (Third Base); 43 Mel Harder (Pitching & First Base); 40 Bill Lobe (Bullpen Catcher); 44 Red Ruffing (Bullpen)

== Player stats ==
=== Batting ===
==== Starters by position ====
Note: Pos = Position; G = Games played; AB = At bats; H = Hits; Avg. = Batting average; HR = Home runs; RBI = Runs batted in

Pos	Player	G	AB	H	Avg.	HR	RBI
C	Jim Hegan	133	416	99	.238	6	43
1B	Luke Easter	128	486	131	.270	27	103
2B	Bobby Ávila	141	542	165	.304	10	58
SS	Ray Boone	151	544	127	.233	12	51
3B	Al Rosen	154	573	152	.265	24	102
OF	Larry Doby	134	447	132	.295	20	69
OF	Bob Kennedy	108	321	79	.246	7	29
OF	Dale Mitchell	134	510	148	.290	11	62

==== Other batters ====
Note: G = Games played; AB = At bats; H = Hits; Avg. = Batting average; HR = Home runs; RBI = Runs batted in

Player	G	AB	H	Avg.	HR	RBI
Harry Simpson	122	332	76	.229	7	24
Sam Chapman	94	246	56	.228	6	36
Birdie Tebbetts	55	137	36	.263	2	18
Snuffy Stirnweiss	50	88	19	.216	1	4
Barney McCosky	31	61	13	.213	0	2
Merl Combs	19	28	5	.179	0	2
Minnie Miñoso	8	14	6	.429	0	2
Paul Lehner	12	13	3	.231	0	1
Clarence Maddern	11	12	2	.167	0	0
Allie Clark	3	10	3	.300	1	3
Hal Naragon	3	8	2	.250	0	0
Milt Nielsen	16	6	0	.000	0	0
Lou Klein	2	2	0	.000	0	0
Ray Murray	1	1	1	1.000	0	1
Thurman Tucker	1	1	0	.000	0	0
Doug Hansen	3	0	0	----	0	0

=== Pitching ===
= Indicates league leader

==== Starting pitchers ====
Note: G = Games pitched; IP = Innings pitched; W = Wins; L = Losses; ERA = Earned run average; SO = Strikeouts

Player	G	IP	W	L	ERA	SO
Early Wynn	37	274.1	20	13	3.02	133
Bob Lemon	42	263.1	17	14	3.52	132
Mike Garcia	47	254.0	20	13	3.15	118
Bob Feller	33	249.2	22	8	3.50	111
Johnny Vander Meer	1	3.0	0	1	18.00	2

==== Other pitchers ====
Note: G = Games pitched; IP = Innings pitched; W = Wins; L = Losses; ERA = Earned run average; SO = Strikeouts

Player	G	IP	W	L	ERA	SO
Steve Gromek	27	107.1	7	4	2.77	40
Bob Chakales	17	68.1	3	4	4.74	32
Sam Jones	2	8.2	0	1	2.08	4

==== Relief pitchers ====
Note: G = Games pitched; W = Wins; L = Losses; SV = Saves; ERA = Earned run average; SO = Strikeouts

Player	G	W	L	SV	ERA	SO
Lou Brissie	54	4	3	9	3.20	50
George Zuverink	16	0	0	0	5.33	14
Dick Rozek	7	0	0	0	2.93	5
Jerry Fahr	5	0	0	0	4.76	0
Bubba Harris	2	0	0	0	4.50	1

== Awards and records ==
=== League leaders ===
- Bob Feller, American League leader, wins

== Farm system ==
Level	Team	League	Manager
AAA	San Diego Padres	Pacific Coast League	Del Baker
AA	Dallas Eagles	Texas League	L. D. Meyer
A	Wilkes-Barre Barons	Eastern League	Bill Norman
A	Wichita Indians	Western League	Joe Schultz
B	Cedar Rapids Indians	Illinois–Indiana–Iowa League	Kerby Farrell
B	Harrisburg Senators	Interstate League	Les Bell and Hal Cox
B	Spartanburg Peaches	Tri-State League	Harry Griswold
C	Bakersfield Indians	California League	Wimpy Quinn
C	Fort Smith Indians	Western Association	Paul O'Dea
D	Daytona Beach Islanders	Florida State League	Mike Tresh
D	Batavia Clippers	PONY League	Ed Kobesky and Joe Vosmik
D	Green Bay Blue Jays	Wisconsin State League	Phil Seghi

LEAGUE CHAMPIONS: Spartanburg
