= Grandstand Managers Night =

1951 baseball promotion

	1	2	3	4	5	6	7	8	9	R	H	E
Philadelphia Athletics	3	0	0	0	0	0	0	0	0	3	7	2
St. Louis Browns	3	0	1	0	0	0	0	1	X	5	9	1
- Date: August 24, 1951
- Venue: Sportsman's Park
- City: St. Louis
- Managers: Jimmy Dykes (Philadelphia Athletics); John Beradino (Note: As a technicality, John Beradino served as a player-manager for the game to officially relay game decisions to the umpires. However, all the decisions were actually voted on by spectators with fans Clark Mitze and Charles E. Hughes drafting vote questions. Beradino served as a substitute for Browns manager Zack Taylor for the game.) (St. Louis Browns)
- Umpires: HP: Bill Summers; 1B: Bill Grieve; 2B: none; 3B: Johnny Stevens
- Attendance: 3,925

Grandstand Managers Night was a Major League Baseball (MLB) promotion in which fans in attendance to a St. Louis Browns game at Sportsman's Park collectively made managerial decisions for the team. The game occurred on August 24, 1951, with the Browns defeating the Philadelphia Athletics by a score of 5–3. While 3,925 fans were in attendance, only 1,115 sat behind the Browns dugout to partake in the promotion with double-sided placards reading "yes" and "no" for voting purposes. It is the only known instance of spectators making managerial decisions in an official MLB game.

== Background ==
With both the Browns and the Athletics already mathematically eliminated from postseason contention, the two-game set between the teams on August 24 and 25 was set to be low-stakes and likely low in attendance. Browns team owner Bill Veeck, known for his incorporation of showmanship and oddities into official games, decided to conduct the fan-managed game as a part of a series of promotions that season intended to boost attendance and gain traction in a St. Louis baseball market dominated by the Cardinals. Only five days prior, Veeck had signed 3-foot-7-inch dwarf Eddie Gaedel to the Browns roster and sent him to the plate in a game against the Detroit Tigers.

The promotion was advertised in advance in local newspapers. On August 15, 1951, Veeck purchased an ad in the St. Louis Globe-Democrat, encouraging fans to apply for admission to the managerial group as well as the role of on-field manager, a position tasked with creating yes-or-no questions relating to the game for the crowd to vote on. To apply, fans had to send their contact information to the team as well as their proposed starting lineup. Fans wishing to be the on-field middleman had to submit a letter of interest to Veeck. Clark Mitze and Charles E. Hughes were chosen as the on-field managers, replacing Zack Taylor. As a technicality, Browns player John Beradino served as the official manager but only relayed the fans' votes.

Paper tickets to the game were designed to appear as a membership card for the "Grandstand Managers' Club." The tickets read that the holder was entitled to "the full privileges and courtesies of the club," including "the second guess," "the right to gripe to the front office," and "the right to suggest trades, purchases, ideas." The paper ticket design included a picture of Louie the Elf, the team's short-lived mascot, as well as Veeck's signature.

== Game summary ==
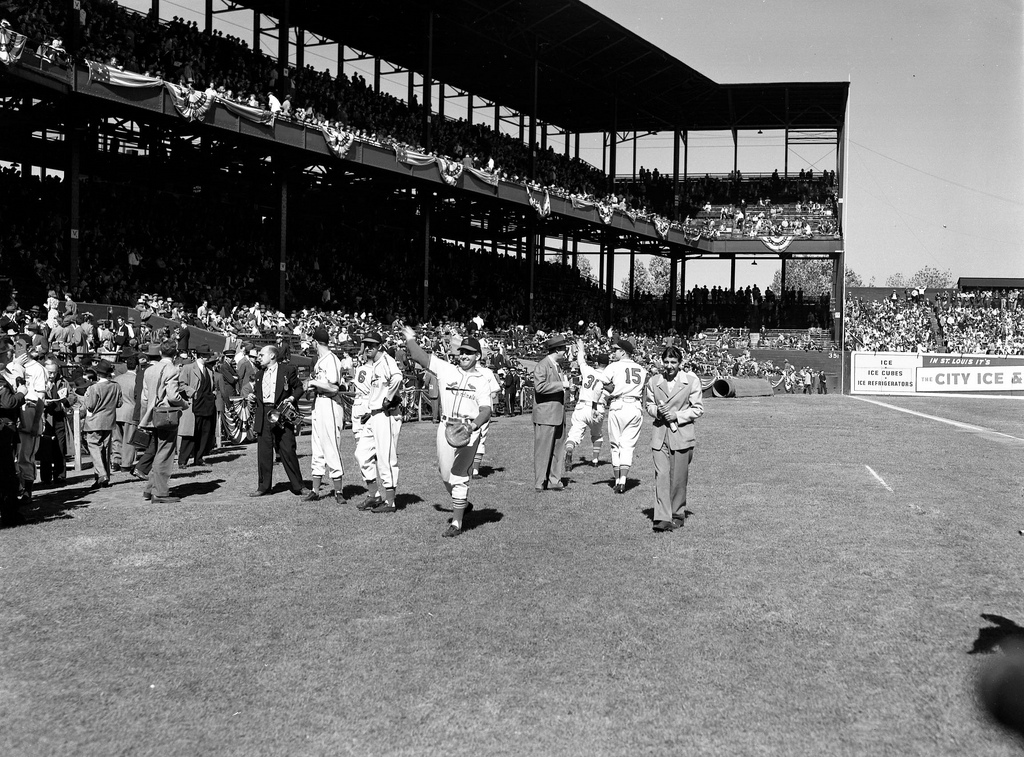
The promotion took place at Sportsman's Park, pictured here in 1946

August 24, 1951 8:30 p.m. (CDT) at Sportsman's Park in St. Louis, Missouri
Team	1	2	3	4	5	6	7	8	9	R	H	E
Philadelphia Athletics	3	0	0	0	0	0	0	0	0	3	7	2
St. Louis Browns	3	0	1	0	0	0	0	1	X	5	9	1
WP: Ned Garver LP: Alex Kellner; Home runs: PHA: Gus Zernial (28); SLB: Sherm Lollar (8); Attendance: 3,925

Just before the game, middlemen managers Clark Mitze and Charles E. Hughes settled into the dugout while the usual Browns manager Zack Taylor sat in a rocking chair with a smoking pipe in hand nearby. St. Louis chose to start Ned Garver, one of the few game decisions not made by the fans. Philadelphia elected to start Alex Kellner.

The first managerial vote came early in the game as Garver surrendered three runs to Philadelphia in the top of the first inning, including a home run hit by slugger Gus Zernial, his 28th on the season en route to becoming the eventual AL home run leader that year. When the Managers' Club was asked if Garver should be pulled from the game, they voted no. With one out, the crowd voted that the infield play back to try for a double play, a tactic that worked as Pete Suder hit into one to end the inning. The Browns offense took the field in the bottom of the first inning and was instantly influenced by the fan-picked lineup — catcher Sherm Lollar, typically a backup to Matt Batts, was selected to start and hit a three-run home run to tie the game at 3–3. With two outs in the bottom of the first inning, the crowd voted that Hank Arft attempt to steal second base, but Arft was caught stealing to end the inning.

The Managers' Club made most of its influential decisions in the first inning of the game, as 6 of the game's 8 total runs were scored then. The group's decision to keep Garver in the game proved successful, as he recovered from his turbulent first inning by giving up only 3 hits in 8 shutout innings on his way to a complete game. At some point in the game, the crowd voted against Lollar attempting to steal bases because of his slow sprint speed. The Browns proceeded to win the game 5–3, and the night was concluded with fireworks that spelled out “Thanks G.S. managers for a swell job. Zack manages tomorrow.”

== Reception ==
Browns starter Ned Garver said that he appreciated seeing the crowd voting 'no' to his proposed removal after he gave up 3 runs in the first inning. Athletics manager Jimmy Dykes criticized the promotion, claiming that Browns owner Bill Veeck was "making a farce of the game." In his 1962 autobiography, Veeck wrote of the promotion that "never has a game been called better."
