= 1951 Philadelphia Athletics season =

1951 Philadelphia Athletics
- League: American League
- Ballpark: Shibe Park
- City: Philadelphia
- Record: 70–84 (.455)
- League place: 6th
- Owners: Earle Mack & Roy Mack
- General managers: Arthur Ehlers
- Managers: Jimmy Dykes
- Television: WPTZ/WCAU/WFIL
- Radio: WIBG (Ray Walton, By Saam, Claude Haring)

The 1951 Philadelphia Athletics season involved the A's finishing sixth in the American League with a record of 70 wins and 84 losses.

== Offseason ==
- November 16, 1950: Morrie Martin was drafted by the Athletics from the Brooklyn Dodgers in the 1950 rule 5 draft.

== Regular season ==
Ferris Fain won the American League batting championship with a .344 batting average.

=== Season standings ===
American League
Team	W	L	Pct.	GB	Home	Road
New York Yankees	98	56	.636	—	56‍–‍22	42‍–‍34
Cleveland Indians	93	61	.604	5	53‍–‍24	40‍–‍37
Boston Red Sox	87	67	.565	11	50‍–‍25	37‍–‍42
Chicago White Sox	81	73	.526	17	39‍–‍38	42‍–‍35
Detroit Tigers	73	81	.474	25	36‍–‍41	37‍–‍40
Philadelphia Athletics	70	84	.455	28	38‍–‍41	32‍–‍43
Washington Senators	62	92	.403	36	32‍–‍44	30‍–‍48
St. Louis Browns	52	102	.338	46	24‍–‍53	28‍–‍49

=== Record vs. opponents ===
1951 American League record Sources:
Team	BOS	CWS	CLE	DET	NYY	PHA	SLB	WSH
Boston	—	11–11	8–14	12–10	11–11	15–7	15–7	15–7
Chicago	11–11	—	12–10–1	12–10	8–14	9–13	15–7	14–8
Cleveland	14–8	10–12–1	—	17–5	7–15	16–6	16–6	13–9
Detroit	10–12	10–12	5–17	—	10–12	13–9	12–10	13–9
New York	11–11	14–8	15–7	12–10	—	13–9	17–5	16–6
Philadelphia	7–15	13–9	6–16	9–13	9–13	—	14–8	12–10
St. Louis	7–15	7–15	6–16	10–12	5–17	8–14	—	9–13
Washington	7–15	8–14	9–13	9–13	6–16	10–12	13–9	—

=== Notable transactions ===
- April 30, 1951: Lou Brissie was traded by the Athletics to the Cleveland Indians, and Paul Lehner was traded by the Athletics to the Chicago White Sox as part of a 3-team trade. The White Sox sent Gus Zernial and Dave Philley to the Athletics, and the Indians sent Sam Zoldak and Ray Murray to the Athletics. The Indians sent Minnie Miñoso to the White Sox.
- June 4, 1951: Kermit Wahl was traded by the Athletics to the Chicago White Sox for Hank Majeski.

=== Roster ===
1951 Philadelphia Athletics
Roster
Pitchers: 19 Lou Brissie; 38 Moe Burtschy; 20 Joe Coleman; 25 Dick Fowler; 17 Bubba Harris; 23 Bob Hooper; 22 Alex Kellner; 37 Johnny Kucab; 26,42 Morrie Martin; 24 Carl Scheib; 30 Bobby Shantz; 36 Hank Wyse; 21 Sam Zoldak	Catchers: 9 Joe Astroth; 14 Ray Murray; 15 Joe Tipton; Infielders: 16 Tod Davis; 8 Ferris Fain; 11 Billy Hitchcock; 1 Eddie Joost; 6 Lou Klein; 3 Lou Limmer; 5 Hank Majeski; 6 Ed Samcoff; 12 Pete Suder; 18 Kermit Wahl	Outfielders: 4 Sam Chapman; 7 Allie Clark; 5 Paul Lehner; 7 Barney McCosky; 2 Wally Moses; 17 Dave Philley; 10 Elmer Valo; 19 Gus Zernial	Manager: 35 Jimmy Dykes; Coaches: 32 Chief Bender; 31 Les McCrabb; 33 Bing Miller; 29 Tom Oliver

== Player stats ==
= Indicates team leader

= Indicates league leader

=== Batting ===
==== Starters by position ====
Note: Pos = Position; G = Games played; AB = At bats; H = Hits; Avg. = Batting average; HR = Home runs; RBI = Runs batted in

Pos	Player	G	AB	H	Avg.	HR	RBI
C	Joe Tipton	72	213	51	.239	3	20
1B	Ferris Fain	117	425	146	.344	6	57
2B	Pete Suder	123	440	108	.245	1	42
SS	Eddie Joost	140	553	160	.289	19	78
3B	Hank Majeski	89	323	92	.285	5	42
OF	Gus Zernial	139	552	151	.274	33	125
OF	Elmer Valo	123	444	134	.302	7	55
OF	Dave Philley	125	468	123	.263	7	59

==== Other batters ====
Note: G = Games played; AB = At bats; H = Hits; Avg. = Batting average; HR = Home runs; RBI = Runs batted in

Player	G	AB	H	Avg.	HR	RBI
Billy Hitchcock	77	222	68	.306	1	36
Lou Limmer	94	213	34	.159	5	30
Joe Astroth	64	187	46	.246	2	19
Allie Clark	56	161	40	.248	4	22
Lou Klein	49	144	33	.229	5	17
Wally Moses	70	136	26	.191	0	9
Ray Murray	40	122	26	.213	0	13
Sam Chapman	18	65	11	.169	0	5
Kermit Wahl	20	59	11	.186	0	6
Paul Lehner	9	28	4	.143	0	1
Barney McCosky	12	27	8	.296	1	1
Tod Davis	11	15	1	.067	0	0
Ed Samcoff	4	11	0	.000	0	0

=== Pitching ===
==== Starting pitchers ====
Note: G = Games pitched; IP = Innings pitched; W = Wins; L = Losses; ERA = Earned run average; SO = Strikeouts

Player	G	IP	W	L	ERA	SO
Alex Kellner	33	209.2	11	14	4.46	94
Bobby Shantz	32	205.1	18	10	3.94	77
Sam Zoldak	26	128.0	6	10	3.16	18
Dick Fowler	22	125.0	5	11	5.62	29
Lou Brissie	2	13.1	0	2	6.75	3

==== Other pitchers ====
Note: G = Games pitched; IP = Innings pitched; W = Wins; L = Losses; ERA = Earned run average; SO = Strikeouts

Player	G	IP	W	L	ERA	SO
Bob Hooper	38	189.0	12	10	4.38	64
Carl Scheib	46	143.0	1	12	4.47	49
Morrie Martin	35	138.0	11	4	3.78	35
Joe Coleman	28	96.1	1	6	5.98	34

==== Relief pitchers ====
Note: G = Games pitched; W = Wins; L = Losses; SV = Saves; ERA = Earned run average; SO = Strikeouts

Player	G	W	L	SV	ERA	SO
Johnny Kucab	30	4	3	3	4.22	23
Hank Wyse	9	1	2	0	7.98	5
Moe Burtschy	7	0	0	0	5.29	4
Bubba Harris	3	0	0	0	9.00	2

== Farm system ==
Level	Team	League	Manager
A	Savannah Indians	Sally League	George Staller
A	Lincoln Athletics	Western League	Frank Skaff
B	Fayetteville Athletics	Carolina League	Red Norris
B	Salisbury Athletics	Interstate League	Bunny Griffiths
C	Rome Colonels	Canadian–American League	Buck Etchison
D	Tarboro A's	Coastal Plain League	Joe Rullo
D	Cordele A's	Georgia–Florida League	Ducky Detweiler and Jimmie DeShong
D	Lexington Indians	North Carolina State League	Harold Harrigan, Gray Hampton and Bob Deese
D	Corning Athletics	PONY League	Irv Hall
