= 1951 Chicago White Sox season =

1951 Chicago White Sox
- League: American League
- Ballpark: Comiskey Park
- City: Chicago
- Owners: Grace Comiskey
- General managers: Frank Lane
- Managers: Paul Richards
- Television: WGN-TV (Jack Brickhouse, Harry Creighton)
- Radio: WJJD/WCFL (Bob Elson)

The 1951 Chicago White Sox season was the team's 51st season in the major leagues, and its 52nd season overall. They finished with a record of 81–73, good for fourth place in the American League, 17 games behind the first place New York Yankees.

== Offseason ==
- November 16, 1950: Joe DeMaestri was drafted by the White Sox from the Boston Red Sox in the 1950 rule 5 draft.
- Prior to 1951 season: Jay Porter was signed as an amateur free agent by the White Sox.

== Regular season ==
In 1951, the White Sox began using a bullpen car.

- May 1, 1951: Mickey Mantle hit his first big league home run against the White Sox. The pitcher who gave up the home run was Randy Gumpert.

=== Season standings ===
American League
Team	W	L	Pct.	GB	Home	Road
New York Yankees	98	56	.636	—	56‍–‍22	42‍–‍34
Cleveland Indians	93	61	.604	5	53‍–‍24	40‍–‍37
Boston Red Sox	87	67	.565	11	50‍–‍25	37‍–‍42
Chicago White Sox	81	73	.526	17	39‍–‍38	42‍–‍35
Detroit Tigers	73	81	.474	25	36‍–‍41	37‍–‍40
Philadelphia Athletics	70	84	.455	28	38‍–‍41	32‍–‍43
Washington Senators	62	92	.403	36	32‍–‍44	30‍–‍48
St. Louis Browns	52	102	.338	46	24‍–‍53	28‍–‍49

=== Record vs. opponents ===
1951 American League record Sources:
Team	BOS	CWS	CLE	DET	NYY	PHA	SLB	WSH
Boston	—	11–11	8–14	12–10	11–11	15–7	15–7	15–7
Chicago	11–11	—	12–10–1	12–10	8–14	9–13	15–7	14–8
Cleveland	14–8	10–12–1	—	17–5	7–15	16–6	16–6	13–9
Detroit	10–12	10–12	5–17	—	10–12	13–9	12–10	13–9
New York	11–11	14–8	15–7	12–10	—	13–9	17–5	16–6
Philadelphia	7–15	13–9	6–16	9–13	9–13	—	14–8	12–10
St. Louis	7–15	7–15	6–16	10–12	5–17	8–14	—	9–13
Washington	7–15	8–14	9–13	9–13	6–16	10–12	13–9	—

=== Notable transactions ===
- April 30, 1951: Gus Zernial and Dave Philley were traded by the White Sox to the Philadelphia Athletics as part of a three-team trade. Minnie Miñoso was traded to the White Sox by the Cleveland Indians, and Paul Lehner was traded to the White Sox by the Athletics. The Athletics sent Lou Brissie to the Indians. The Indians sent Sam Zoldak and Ray Murray to the Athletics.
- June 4, 1951: Hank Majeski was traded by the White Sox to the Philadelphia Athletics for Kermit Wahl.
- June 4, 1951: Kermit Wahl and Paul Lehner were traded by the White Sox to the St. Louis Browns for Don Lenhardt.
- July 31, 1951: Ray Coleman was selected off waivers by the White Sox from the St. Louis Browns.

=== Opening Day lineup ===
- Chico Carrasquel, SS
- Floyd Baker, 3B
- Al Zarilla, RF
- Gus Zernial, LF
- Eddie Robinson, 1B
- Phil Masi, C
- Jim Busby, CF
- Nellie Fox, 2B
- Billy Pierce, P

=== Roster ===
1951 Chicago White Sox
Roster
Pitchers: 59 Luis Aloma; 27 Hal Brown; 56 Bob Cain; 29 Joe Dobson; 12 Harry Dorish; 27 Ross Grimsley; 18 Randy Gumpert; 34 Ken Holcombe; 48 Howie Judson; 23 Lou Kretlow; 39 Dick Littlefield; 16 Bob Mahoney; 19 Billy Pierce; 35 Saul Rogovin; 49 Marv Rotblatt	Catchers: 45 Joe Erautt; 27 Sammy Hairston; 38 Phil Masi; 24 Gus Niarhos; 45 Bud Sheely; 16 Red Wilson; Infielders: 8 Floyd Baker; 5 Bob Boyd; 17 Chico Carrasquel; 14 Joe DeMaestri; 25 Bob Dillinger; 26 Nellie Fox; 25 Gordon Goldsberry; 5 Bert Haas; 5 Hank Majeski; 46 Eddie Robinson	Outfielders: 3 Jim Busby; 39 Ray Coleman; 15 Paul Lehner; 6 Don Lenhardt; 9 Minnie Miñoso; 9 Dave Philley; 7 Bud Stewart; 2 Al Zarilla; 6 Gus Zernial; Other batters: 49 Rocky Nelson	Manager: 22 Paul Richards; Coaches: 33 Jimmy Adair; 44 Ray Berres; 28 Doc Cramer; 40 Luman Harris

== Player stats ==
=== Batting ===
Note: G = Games played; AB = At bats; R = Runs scored; H = Hits; 2B = Doubles; 3B = Triples; HR = Home runs; RBI = Runs batted in; BB = Base on balls; SO = Strikeouts; AVG = Batting average; SB = Stolen bases

Player	G	AB	R	H	2B	3B	HR	RBI	BB	SO	AVG	SB
Floyd Baker, 3B, 2B	82	133	24	35	6	1	0	14	25	12	.263	0
Bob Boyd, 1B	12	18	3	3	0	1	0	4	3	3	.167	0
Jim Busby, CF	143	477	59	135	15	2	5	68	40	46	.283	26
Chico Carrasquel, SS	147	538	41	142	22	4	2	58	46	39	.264	14
Ray Coleman, OF	51	181	21	50	8	7	3	21	15	14	.276	2
Joe DeMaestri, SS, 2B	56	74	8	15	0	2	1	3	5	11	.203	0
Bob Dillinger, 3B	89	299	39	90	6	4	0	20	15	17	.301	5
Joe Erautt, C	16	25	3	4	1	0	0	0	3	2	.160	0
Nellie Fox, 2B	147	604	93	189	32	12	4	55	43	11	.313	9
Gordon Goldsberry, 1B	10	11	4	1	0	0	0	1	2	2	.091	0
Bert Haas, 1B, RF	23	43	1	7	0	1	1	2	5	4	.163	0
Sam Hairston, C	4	5	1	2	1	0	0	1	2	0	.400	0
Paul Lehner, OF	23	72	9	15	3	1	0	3	10	4	.208	0
Don Lenhardt, LF	64	199	23	53	9	1	10	45	24	25	.266	1
Hank Majeski, 3B	12	35	4	9	4	0	0	6	1	0	.257	0
Phil Masi, C	84	225	24	61	11	2	4	28	32	27	.271	1
Minnie Miñoso, 3B, RF, LF	138	516	107	167	32	14	10	74	71	41	.324	31
Rocky Nelson, PH	6	5	0	0	0	0	0	0	1	0	.000	0
Gus Niarhos, C	66	168	27	43	6	0	1	10	47	9	.256	4
Dave Philley, LF	7	25	0	6	2	0	0	2	2	3	.240	0
Eddie Robinson, 1B	151	564	85	159	23	5	29	117	77	54	.282	2
Bud Sheely, C	34	89	2	16	2	0	0	7	6	7	.180	0
Bud Stewart, LF, RF	95	217	40	60	13	5	6	40	29	9	.276	1
Red Wilson, C	4	11	1	3	1	0	0	0	1	2	.273	0
Al Zarilla, RF, LF	120	382	56	98	21	2	10	60	60	57	.257	2
Gus Zernial, LF	4	19	2	2	0	0	0	4	2	2	.105	0

Player	G	AB	R	H	2B	3B	HR	RBI	BB	SO	AVG	SB
Luis Aloma, P	25	20	2	7	1	0	0	2	1	5	.350	0
Hal Brown, P	4	2	0	2	0	0	0	1	1	0	1.000	0
Bob Cain, P	4	9	1	3	1	0	0	0	0	3	.333	0
Joe Dobson, P	28	46	2	3	1	0	0	1	0	20	.065	0
Fritz Dorish, P	32	31	2	8	2	0	0	0	0	3	.258	0
Ross Grimsley, P	7	2	0	0	0	0	0	0	0	1	.000	0
Randy Gumpert, P	37	45	5	15	1	0	0	9	2	9	.333	0
Ken Holcombe, P	28	44	5	11	1	0	0	3	3	16	.250	0
Howie Judson, P	27	33	0	4	0	0	0	1	2	14	.121	0
Lou Kretlow, P	26	48	1	4	0	0	0	5	2	24	.083	0
Dick Littlefield, P	4	1	0	0	0	0	0	0	2	0	.000	0
Billy Pierce, P	39	79	10	16	1	0	0	3	9	17	.203	0
Saul Rogovin, P	24	74	7	15	3	0	0	0	5	8	.203	1
Marv Rotblatt, P	26	9	0	0	0	0	0	0	0	4	.000	0
Team totals	155	5378	714	1453	229	64	86	668	594	525	.270	99

=== Pitching ===
Note: W = Wins; L = Losses; ERA = Earned run average; G = Games pitched; GS = Games started; SV = Saves; IP = Innings pitched; H = Hits allowed; R = Runs allowed; ER = Earned runs allowed; HR = Home runs allowed; BB = Walks allowed; K = Strikeouts

Player	W	L	ERA	G	GS	SV	IP	H	R	ER	HR	BB	K
Luis Aloma	6	0	1.82	25	1	3	69.1	52	14	14	3	24	25
Hal Brown	0	0	9.35	3	0	1	8.2	15	9	9	3	4	4
Bob Cain	1	2	3.76	4	4	0	26.1	25	14	11	3	13	3
Joe Dobson	7	6	3.62	28	21	3	146.2	136	68	59	17	51	67
Fritz Dorish	5	6	3.54	32	4	0	96.2	101	50	38	6	31	29
Ross Grimsley	0	0	3.86	7	0	0	14.0	12	8	6	1	10	8
Randy Gumpert	9	8	4.32	33	16	2	141.2	156	74	68	20	34	45
Ken Holcombe	11	12	3.78	28	23	0	159.1	142	69	67	9	68	39
Howie Judson	5	6	3.77	27	14	1	121.2	124	67	51	9	55	43
Lou Kretlow	6	9	4.20	26	18	0	137.0	129	77	64	7	74	89
Dick Littlefield	1	1	8.38	4	2	0	9.2	9	12	9	1	17	7
Bob Mahoney	0	0	5.40	3	0	0	6.2	5	4	4	1	5	3
Billy Pierce	15	14	3.03	37	28	2	240.1	237	93	81	14	73	113
Saul Rogovin	11	7	2.48	22	22	0	192.2	166	64	53	11	67	77
Marv Rotblatt	4	2	3.40	26	2	2	47.2	44	21	18	4	23	20
Team totals	81	73	3.50	155	155	14	1418.1	1353	644	552	109	549	572

== Farm system ==
Level	Team	League	Manager
AAA	Sacramento Solons	Pacific Coast League	Joe Gordon
AA	Memphis Chicks	Southern Association	Luke Appling
A	Colorado Springs Sky Sox	Western League	Skeeter Webb and Otto Denning
B	Waterloo White Hawks	Illinois–Indiana–Iowa League	Otto Denning, Ed Taylor and Skeeter Webb
C	Hot Springs Bathers	Cotton States League	Rex Carr
C	Superior Blues	Northern League	Buster Mills
D	Madisonville Miners	KITTY League	Burl Storie
D	Wisconsin Rapids White Sox	Wisconsin State League	Ira Hutchinson
