= Allie Clark =

American baseball player (1923–2012)

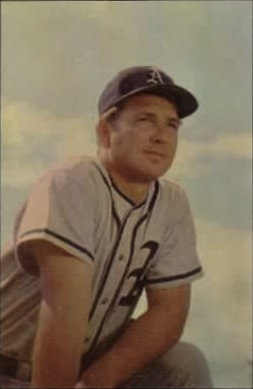
- Clark, c. 1953
- Right fielder
- Born: June 16, 1923; South Amboy, New Jersey, U.S.
- Died: April 2, 2012 (aged 88); Sayreville, New Jersey, U.S.
- Batted: Right Threw: Right

MLB debut
- August 5, 1947, for the New York Yankees

Last MLB appearance
- June 5, 1953, for the Chicago White Sox

MLB statistics
- Batting average: .262
- Home runs: 32
- Runs batted in: 149
- Stats at Baseball Reference

Teams
- New York Yankees (1947); Cleveland Indians (1948–1951); Philadelphia Athletics (1951–1953); Chicago White Sox (1953)

Career highlights and awards
- 2× World Series champion (1947, 1948)

Alfred Aloysius "Allie" Clark (June 16, 1923 – April 2, 2012) was an American right fielder in Major League Baseball who played for seven seasons in the American League with the New York Yankees, Cleveland Indians, Philadelphia Athletics and Chicago White Sox. In 358 career games, Clark recorded a batting average of .262 and accumulated 32 home runs and 149 runs batted in (RBIs).

Clark was born in South Amboy, New Jersey, where he attended St. Mary's High School, and joined the New York Yankees organization after graduating. He spent the next six seasons playing minor league baseball and serving in the U.S. Army during World War II. He made his major league debut in 1947, and after one year with the Yankees, he spent four seasons with the Cleveland Indians. He was a member of the World Champion Yankees and Indians after the two teams won the 1947 World Series and 1948 World Series, respectively. He then played with the Philadelphia Athletics and Chicago White Sox through 1953, and played minor league baseball until 1958. After retiring, he returned to South Amboy and resided there until his death in 2012.

== Early life and minor leagues ==
Clark was born in South Amboy, New Jersey on June 16, 1923. His parents were Alfred and Helen Clark, and he had four brothers and two sisters. He attended St. Mary's High School in South Amboy, later known as Cardinal McCarrick High School, where he served as the baseball team's shortstop. Clark led the 1939 baseball team to the county and state championships, and was named to the All-State baseball team that year; he has since been inducted into his high school's athletic Hall of Fame.

After graduating from high school, Clark was signed by the New York Yankees as an amateur free agent. He was scouted while in high school, and was invited to a tryout in Newark, New Jersey, where he was signed to a minor league deal. Clark spent his first year in their farm system with the Easton Yankees of the Eastern Shore League and the Amsterdam Rugmakers of the Canadian–American League. He hit .325 for the Yankees in 70 games, and .368 in 20 games for the Rugmakers. In 1942, he was promoted to the Norfolk Tars of the Piedmont League, where he spent the season as the team's second baseman and played with future major league teammate Vic Raschi. In 129 games with the team, he hit .328 with 34 doubles.

The following year, Clark was promoted to the Newark Bears of the International League, having played one game for them the previous year. After playing in 24 games for the Bears, he was called to serve the United States Army in World War II. Clark served with the combat medical corps in England and France, and saw some active combat in Germany. After being discharged at the conclusion of the war, Clark returned to baseball in 1946. He was unable to stay in baseball shape due to combat duties, and as a result of having slowed down, the Yankees organization converted him to an outfielder and third baseman. In 97 games for Newark, Clark hit .344 with 14 home runs and 70 runs batted in.

== Major leagues ==
Clark played well enough in 1946 to earn a tryout for the 1947 New York Yankees, and competed with Frank Colman for the final outfield position. He lost the battle and began the season in Newark. Over the course of the 1947 season in Newark, he had a batting average of .334 with 23 home runs and 86 RBIs. His efforts got him noticed by the Yankees, and he made his major league debut on August 5. Within two weeks of being called up, Clark had a streak of six straight at-bats with a hit. He finished the regular season with a .373 batting average in 24 games. He was named to the 1947 World Series roster, and played in three games. In game seven, he served as a pinch hitter for Yogi Berra, hitting a single, which helped the Yankees win the World Series; he considered this one of his greatest moments in professional baseball.

He wore the #3 jersey for the New York Yankees in 1947, and was one of the last players to wear it before it was retired in honor of Babe Ruth the following year. On December 11, 1947, he was traded to the Cleveland Indians for pitcher Red Embree. To begin the 1948 season, Clark was in a crowded outfield position battle, with Larry Doby, Thurman Tucker, and Walt Judnich fighting for playing time, but Clark was noted as the most interesting to watch by The Sporting News due to owner Bill Veeck's high regard for him. The only weakness noted in his game was a sore arm from the previous season, to which Clark responded that reading the newspaper was the first time he noticed anything about a bad arm.

He was primarily a starter in the outfield for the first half of the season, and during the second half he split time in right field with Hank Edwards. Clark finished the year having played 81 games, most in the outfield and a few at third base, and hit .310 with nine home runs and 38 RBIs. The Indians tied with the Boston Red Sox that season and had to play a tie-breaker to earn the right to play in the 1948 World Series. In that game, Indians manager Lou Boudreau placed Clark at first base, the first time he had played that position at any level. Clark then played in one game in the World Series, going hitless in four plate appearances as the Indians won the series. Clark became the first player in history to win back-to-back World Series with different teams.

Clark started the 1949 season primarily as a pinch hitter, having lost his platoon duties alongside Edwards to Bob Kennedy. He was used mainly as a pinch hitter throughout the year, and by August he was sent down to the San Diego Padres of the Pacific Coast League to make room for Luke Easter, finishing the year with a .176 batting average in 35 games. In 42 games with San Diego over the last two months of the season, Clark hit .295 with 11 home runs. During spring training in 1950, Clark hit .473, leading to a battle with Kennedy and Easter for the right field spot. He spent the season in Cleveland as the backup in right field for Kennedy, and had a .215 batting average with six home runs in 59 games.

In 1951, Clark served as a substitute outfielder for three games with the Indians after Easter was out due to injury. After those three games, he was traded to the Philadelphia Athletics along with Lou Klein for Sam Chapman. His outings that season included a four-hit game against the St. Louis Browns on June 24. In 59 total games, 56 with the Athletics, Clark had a .251 batting average in 171 at-bats. He spent the 1952 season as the fourth outfielder after being considered for a starting outfield position alongside Elmer Valo and Gus Zernial. In a game on June 12, Clark ran into the outfield fence chasing a fly ball, and missed some playing time as a result.

Late in the 1952 season, Clark was ejected and fined $50 for arguing strikes in a game where Athletics Eddie Joost and manager Jimmy Dykes were also ejected; Clark's was the only fine not to be rescinded, a move that occurred on Dykes's request. In 71 games, he hit .274 with seven home runs. Clark started the 1953 season with the Athletics, and started off the year with a grand slam home run in spring training against the Philadelphia Phillies in the tenth inning. In 20 games with the Athletics, Clark had a .203 batting average and 13 RBIs, which led the team when that he was sold to the Chicago White Sox in mid-May. A month later, after playing in nine games for the White Sox, he was purchased by the Rochester Red Wings for $20,000, returning to the minors and ending his major league career.

== Later life ==
Clark spent the next five seasons with the Rochester Red Wings of the International League, part of the St. Louis Cardinals organization. In 80 games in 1953, he had a .328 batting average. He came close to making the 1954 International League All-Star team, but missed the cut by four votes to Sam Jethroe. He finished the year with a .323 average and 18 home runs. During the offseason when he was with Rochester, Clark also played winter baseball for various teams in the Puerto Rican League.

To start the 1955 season, Clark held out for a new deal because he felt that he deserved a promotion to the Cardinals' major league roster; he ended the holdout in March. That season, he hit .308 with 23 home runs, 84 RBIs, and was named as a finalist for the International League Most Valuable Player Award. For the next two seasons, Clark hit .289 and .285, and he finished his time in Rochester with four straight seasons of 20 or more doubles. He ranks in the top ten in Red Wings history for RBIs (7th), home runs (9th), games played (9th), and hits (10th), and is a member of the Red Wings Hall of Fame, inducted in 1998. He began the 1958 season with the Denver Bears, but left the team due to the distance between himself and his family. In his final year of professional baseball, he played a combined 70 games with the New Orleans Pelicans, San Antonio Missions, and Indianapolis Indians.

After retiring from professional baseball, Clark worked for 30 years as an employee of Iron Workers Local 373, and served as a member of the South Amboy city council. He lived with his wife, Frances, and the two had six children together. He died on April 2, 2012, in South Amboy.
