= Jim McManus (baseball) =

American baseball player (born 1936)

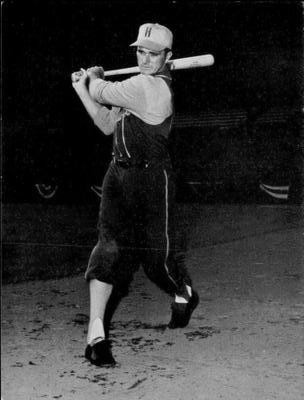
- First baseman
- Born: July 20, 1936; Brookline, Massachusetts, U.S.
- Died: 7 November 2023 (aged 87); Duluth, Georgia, U.S.
- Batted: Left Threw: Left

MLB debut
- September 21, 1960, for the Kansas City Athletics

Last MLB appearance
- October 2, 1960, for the Kansas City Athletics

MLB statistics
- Batting average: .308
- Home runs: 1
- Runs batted in: 2

NPB statistics
- Batting average: .236
- Home runs: 20
- Runs batted in: 73
- Stats at Baseball Reference

Teams
- Kansas City Athletics (1960); Taiyo Whales (1962–1963)

James Michael McManus (July 20, 1936 – November 2, 2023) was an American former professional baseball player whose ten-season career included five games played in Major League Baseball for the Kansas City Athletics (1960) and two years (1962–1963) in Japanese baseball (NPB). A first baseman, McManus threw and batted left-handed and was listed as 6 feet 4 inches (1.93 m) tall and 215 pounds (98 kg). He was born in Brookline, Massachusetts.

McManus entered pro ball in 1954 in the Detroit Tigers' organization. After four years in the Detroit farm system, on April 3, 1958, he was included as the "player to be named later" in a 13-player off-season trade with the Athletics in which the Tigers obtained second baseman Billy Martin and veteran outfielder Gus Zernial. McManus spent three more years in the minor leagues before Kansas City recalled him in September 1960. He went hitless in his first two at bats as a pinch hitter, then started at first base for the Athletics' final three games of the 1960 regular season, all against his original organization, the Tigers. McManus collected four hits in those three games, including his only extra-base hit and home run, a solo shot struck against Frank Lary on September 30. He ended his MLB career with a .308 batting average (4-for-13) and two runs batted in.

During his two campaigns with the Taiyo Whales of NPB, McManus batted .236 with 20 home runs.

McManus died on November 2, 2023.
