= Merl Combs =

American baseball player (1919–1981)

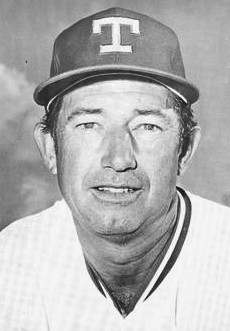
- Combs in 1974 as a coach for the Texas Rangers
- Shortstop
- Born: December 11, 1919; Los Angeles, California, U.S.
- Died: July 7, 1981 (aged 61); Riverside, California, U.S.
- Batted: Left Threw: Right

MLB debut
- September 12, 1947, for the Boston Red Sox

Last MLB appearance
- September 28, 1952, for the Cleveland Indians

MLB statistics
- Batting average: .202
- Home runs: 2
- Runs batted in: 25
- Stats at Baseball Reference

Teams
- Boston Red Sox (1947, 1949–1950); Washington Senators (1950); Cleveland Indians (1951–1952)

Merrill Russell "Merl" Combs (December 11, 1919 – July 7, 1981) was an American professional baseball player, scout and coach. Combs' active career spanned ten seasons (1941; 1946–1954). He was a backup shortstop in Major League Baseball who played between 1947 and 1952 for the Boston Red Sox (1947; 1949–50), Washington Senators (1950) and Cleveland Indians (1951–52). Combs batted left-handed and threw right-handed; he stood 6 feet (1.8 m) tall and weighed 172 pounds (78 kg). He was born in Los Angeles, and attended the University of Southern California.

In a five-season MLB career, Combs was a .202 hitter (73-for-361) with two home runs and 25 RBI in 140 games played, including 45 runs, six doubles and one triple. Thereafter, he was a longtime scout for multiple Major League organizations, and spent one season, 1975, as a coach on the staff of the Texas Rangers.

Combs died of lung cancer in Riverside, California, at the age of 61.
