= Ed Samcoff =

American baseball player (1924–2018)

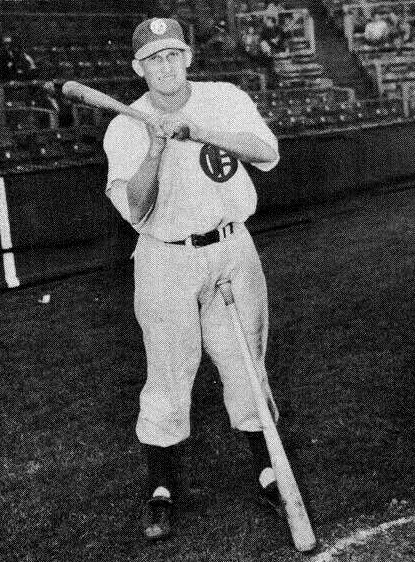
- Samcoff in 1948
- Second baseman
- Born: September 1, 1924; Sacramento, California, U.S.
- Died: March 29, 2018 (aged 93); Fair Oaks, California, U.S.
- Batted: Right Threw: Right

MLB debut
- April 21, 1951, for the Philadelphia Athletics

Last MLB appearance
- April 26, 1951, for the Philadelphia Athletics

MLB statistics
- Batting average: .000
- At bats: 10
- Runs scored: 0
- Stats at Baseball Reference

Teams
- Philadelphia Athletics (1951)

Edward William Samcoff (September 1, 1924 – March 29, 2018) was an American professional baseball player. An infielder, his six-season (1946–1951) career in the game included a four-game stint in the Major Leagues for the Philadelphia Athletics at the outset of the 1951 season. Samcoff threw and batted right-handed; he stood 5 feet 10 inches (1.78 m) tall and weighed 165 pounds (75 kg). He was born in Sacramento, California.

Samcoff made his MLB debut on April 21, 1951 as a pinch hitter at Fenway Park against Chuck Stobbs of the Boston Red Sox; he batted for Philadelphia pitcher Bob Hooper and grounded out, Stobbs to first baseman Billy Goodman. He then started three consecutive games for the Athletics at second base from April 24–26. Samcoff went hitless in ten at bats with one base on balls, but played errorless ball in the field, handling ten chances and turning three double plays. He spent the remainder of the 1951 campaign in the minor leagues, with the Double-A Memphis Chicks of the Southern Association. In 795 minor league games played, Samcoff collected 851 hits and posted a batting average of .291. Samcoff died in March 2018 at the age of 93.
