= Tex Hoyle =

American baseball player

- Pitcher
- Born: July 17, 1921; Carbondale, Pennsylvania, U.S.
- Died: July 4, 1994 (aged 72); Carbondale, Pennsylvania, U.S.
- Batted: Right Threw: Right

MLB debut
- April 18, 1952, for the Philadelphia Athletics

Last MLB appearance
- April 29, 1952, for the Philadelphia Athletics

MLB statistics
- Win–loss record: 0–0
- Earned run average: 27.00
- Innings pitched: 2⅓
- Stats at Baseball Reference

Teams
- Philadelphia Athletics (1952)

Roland Edison "Tex" Hoyle (July 17, 1921 – July 4, 1994) was an American professional baseball pitcher. The native of Carbondale, Pennsylvania—belying his nickname—appeared in three games in Major League Baseball as a relief pitcher for the Philadelphia Athletics during the 1952 season. He stood 6 feet 4 inches (1.93 m) tall and weighed 170 pounds (77 kg).

Hoyle's nine-season minor league career (1940–1942; 1946–1949; 1951–1952) was spent largely in the New York Yankees' organization. His brief time in the majors occurred during the opening weeks of the 1952 campaign, at a time when MLB teams were permitted to carry 28 players on their roster until mid-May. Hoyle allowed two hits but no runs in two innings pitched in appearances April 18 and 19 at Fenway Park. But, in his third and final big-league game on April 29 at Shibe Park, he was treated rudely by the visiting Cleveland Indians. Coming into the game in the eighth inning in relief of Johnny Kucab with Philadelphia already losing 14–6, Hoyle recorded only one out and surrendered seven hits, a base on balls, and seven earned runs. Among the hits he allowed were three-run home runs to Al Rosen and Birdie Tebbetts—Rosen's blast was his third of the evening.

Hoyle pitched in only seven more pro games in organized baseball with the Triple-A Ottawa A's before retiring. His major league line included nine hits, one base on balls and seven earned runs allowed in 21/3 innings pitched, with one strikeout. His ERA was 27.00.
