= Bob Mahoney (baseball) =

American baseball player (1928–2000)

- Pitcher
- Born: June 20, 1928; Le Roy, Minnesota, U.S.
- Died: August 27, 2000 (aged 72); Lincoln, Nebraska, U.S.
- Batted: Right Threw: Right

MLB debut
- May 3, 1951, for the Chicago White Sox

Last MLB appearance
- June 14, 1952, for the St. Louis Browns

MLB statistics
- Win–loss record: 2–5
- Earned run average: 4.96
- Strikeouts: 34
- Stats at Baseball Reference

Teams
- Chicago White Sox (1951); St. Louis Browns (1951–1952)

Robert Paul Mahoney (June 20, 1928 – August 27, 2000) was an American Major League Baseball pitcher who appeared in 36 games for the 1951 Chicago White Sox and the 1951–1952 St. Louis Browns of the American League. Born in Le Roy, Minnesota, Mahoney was a right-hander who stood 6 feet 1 inch (1.85 m) tall and weighed 185 pounds (84 kg).

Mahoney's six-year professional baseball career began in 1947 in the St. Louis Cardinals' farm system, when he won 17 games for the Class D Carthage Cardinals of the Kansas-Oklahoma-Missouri League. It was the first of three minor-league seasons during which Mahoney posted gaudy win totals. After the third, when he went 20–7 for the Class A Omaha Cardinals of the Western League, he was selected by the White Sox in that off-season's Rule 5 draft.

Mahoney appeared in three games in relief for Chicago during the early weeks of the 1951 season. He was effective in his first two outings, but in the third, on May 13 at Comiskey Park, he permitted a grand slam home run to Al Rosen of the Cleveland Indians in a lopsided, 11–2 defeat. The White Sox placed him on waivers, and he was claimed by the pitching-poor St. Louis Browns on May 29.

The remainder of Mahoney's MLB career was spent with the Browns. He worked in 33 games for them through June 14, 1952, making four starts, and posting a 2–5 won–lost record with no complete games or saves. In perhaps his best overall performance, on June 29, 1951, against his former team, the White Sox, he threw 62/3 innings in a mop-up role, allowed two runs on four hits, and collected two singles in three at bats at the plate.

In his 36 big-league games, Mahoney permitted 99 hits and 50 bases on balls in 902/3 innings pitched, with 34 strikeouts. His career earned run average was 4.96.
