= 1951 New York Yankees season =

Season for the Major League Baseball team the New York Yankees

1951 New York Yankees
- World Series champions American League champions
- League: American League
- Ballpark: Yankee Stadium
- City: New York City
- Record: 98–56 (.636)
- League place: 1st
- Owners: Dan Topping; Del Webb
- General managers: George Weiss
- Managers: Casey Stengel
- Television: WABD/WPIX
- Radio: WINS (AM) (Mel Allen, Bill Crowley, Dizzy Dean, Art Gleeson)

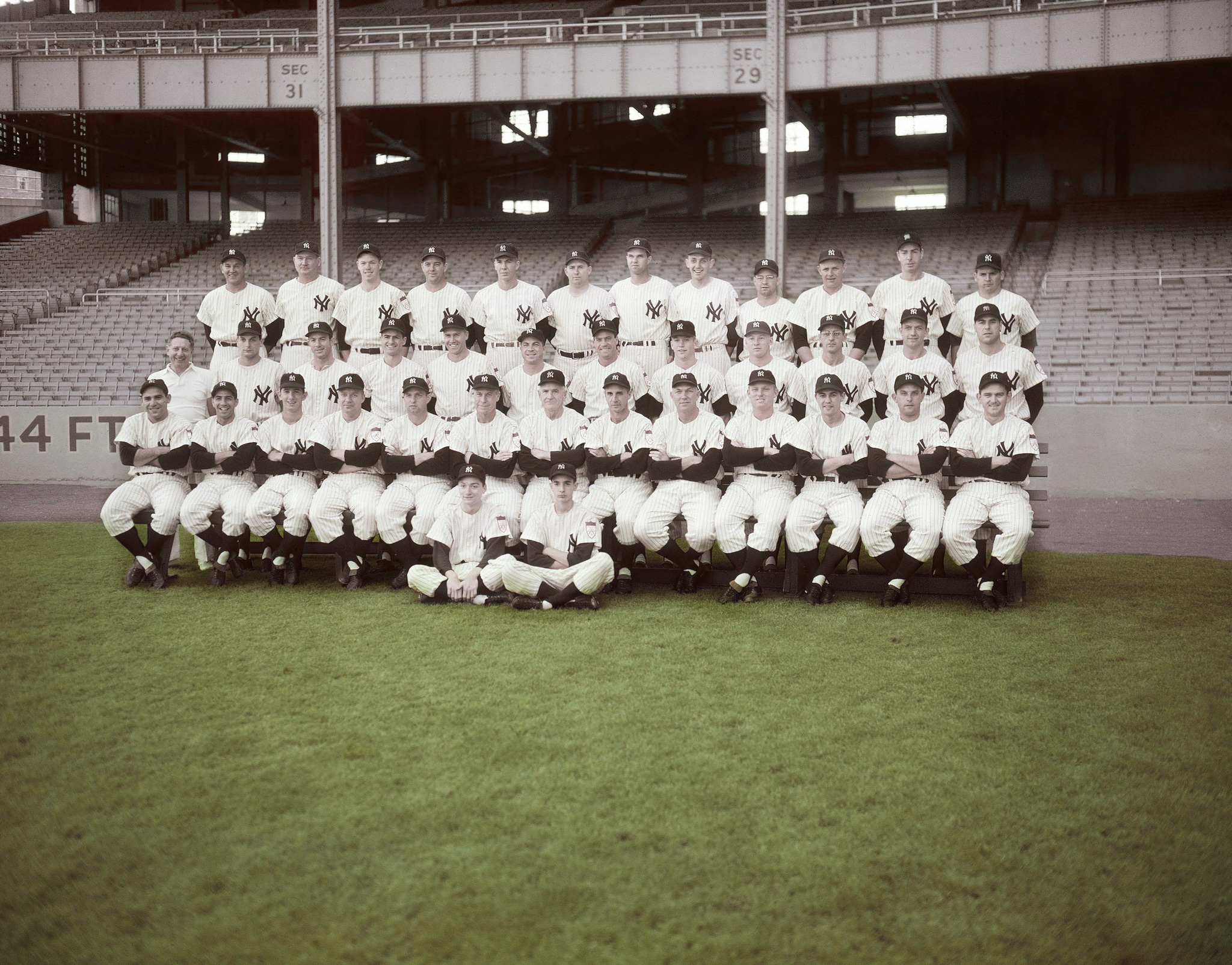
The 1951 Yankees team

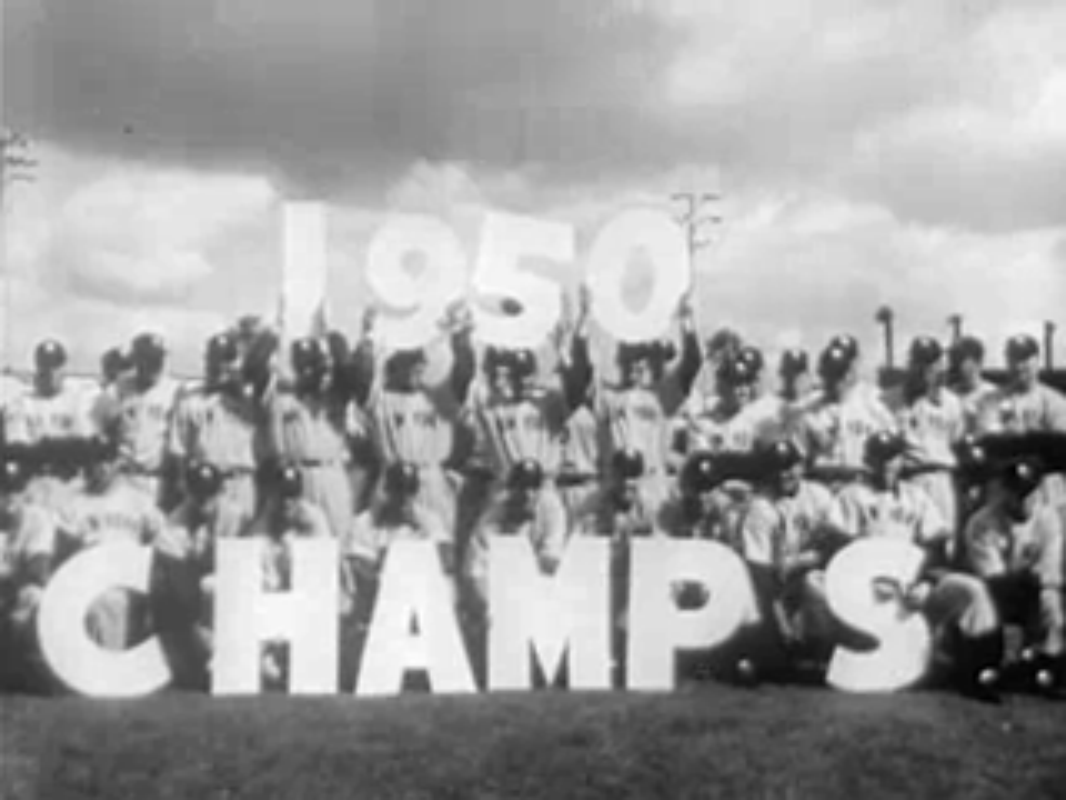
The 1951 Yankees celebrate their victory in the previous season's World Series.

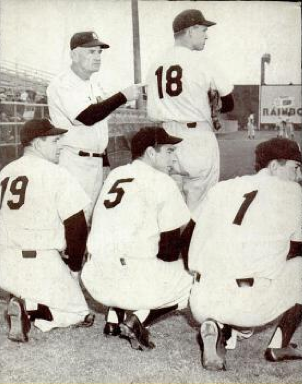
Casey Stengel lecturing Yankee players in 1951.

The 1951 New York Yankees season was the 49th season for the team. The team finished with a record of 98–56, winning their 18th pennant, finishing five games ahead of the Cleveland Indians. New York was managed by Casey Stengel. The Yankees played at Yankee Stadium. In the World Series, they defeated the New York Giants in 6 games.

This year was noted for a "changing of the guard" for the Yankees, as it was Joe DiMaggio's final season and Mickey Mantle's first. The 1951 season also marked the first year of Bob Sheppard's long tenure as Yankee Stadium's public address announcer.

== Offseason ==
- Prior to 1951 season (exact date unknown)
  - Jerry Lumpe was signed as an amateur free agent by the Yankees.
  - Don Taussig was acquired from the Yankees by the New York Giants.

== Regular season ==
- April 17, 1951: Mickey Mantle makes his big league debut for the New York Yankees. The Yankees opponent is the Boston Red Sox.
- May 1, 1951: Mickey Mantle hits his first major league home run. The game was played against the Chicago White Sox and the pitcher who gave up the home run was Randy Gumpert. The home run was in the sixth inning and was measured at 450 feet.
- September 18, 1951: Allie Reynolds threw a no-hitter to clinch the American League pennant. It was the first time that a pitcher threw a no-hitter to clinch a pennant.

=== Season standings ===
American League
Team	W	L	Pct.	GB	Home	Road
New York Yankees	98	56	.636	—	56‍–‍22	42‍–‍34
Cleveland Indians	93	61	.604	5	53‍–‍24	40‍–‍37
Boston Red Sox	87	67	.565	11	50‍–‍25	37‍–‍42
Chicago White Sox	81	73	.526	17	39‍–‍38	42‍–‍35
Detroit Tigers	73	81	.474	25	36‍–‍41	37‍–‍40
Philadelphia Athletics	70	84	.455	28	38‍–‍41	32‍–‍43
Washington Senators	62	92	.403	36	32‍–‍44	30‍–‍48
St. Louis Browns	52	102	.338	46	24‍–‍53	28‍–‍49

=== Record vs. opponents ===
1951 American League record Sources:
Team	BOS	CWS	CLE	DET	NYY	PHA	SLB	WSH
Boston	—	11–11	8–14	12–10	11–11	15–7	15–7	15–7
Chicago	11–11	—	12–10–1	12–10	8–14	9–13	15–7	14–8
Cleveland	14–8	10–12–1	—	17–5	7–15	16–6	16–6	13–9
Detroit	10–12	10–12	5–17	—	10–12	13–9	12–10	13–9
New York	11–11	14–8	15–7	12–10	—	13–9	17–5	16–6
Philadelphia	7–15	13–9	6–16	9–13	9–13	—	14–8	12–10
St. Louis	7–15	7–15	6–16	10–12	5–17	8–14	—	9–13
Washington	7–15	8–14	9–13	9–13	6–16	10–12	13–9	—

=== Notable transactions ===
- May 14, 1951: Billy Johnson was traded by the Yankees to the St. Louis Cardinals for Don Bollweg and $15,000.

=== Roster ===
1951 New York Yankees
Roster
Pitchers: 28 Tommy Byrne; 26 Tom Ferrick; 40 Bobby Hogue; 18 Jack Kramer; 21 Bob Kuzava; 30 Eddie Lopat; 28,52 Tom Morgan; 18 Bob Muncrief; 26 Ernie Nevel; 35 Joe Ostrowski; 24 Stubby Overmire; 23 Bob Porterfield; 17 Vic Raschi; 22 Allie Reynolds; 11 Johnny Sain; 21 Fred Sanford; 20 Art Schallock; 19 Spec Shea; 40,53 Bob Wiesler	Catchers: 8 Yogi Berra; 20,45 Clint Courtney; 32 Ralph Houk; 29 Charlie Silvera; Infielders: 9 Jim Brideweser; 6,9 Bobby Brown; 42 Jerry Coleman; 41 Joe Collins; 38 Johnny Hopp; 24 Billy Johnson; 1 Billy Martin; 12 Gil McDougald; 36 Johnny Mize; 10 Phil Rizzuto	Outfielders: 25 Hank Bauer; 7 Bob Cerv; 5 Joe DiMaggio; 27,40 Jackie Jensen; 6,7 Mickey Mantle; 7 Cliff Mapes; 23 Archie Wilson; 14 Gene Woodling	Manager: 37 Casey Stengel; Coaches: 2 Frankie Crosetti; 33 Bill Dickey; 15 Tommy Henrich; 31 Jim Turner

== Player stats ==
=== Batting ===
= Indicates team leader

==== Starters by position ====
Note: Pos = Position; G = Games played; AB = At bats; H = Hits; Avg. = Batting average; HR = Home runs; RBI = Runs batted in

Pos	Player	G	AB	H	Avg.	HR	RBI
C	Yogi Berra	141	547	161	.294	27	88
1B	Joe Collins	125	262	75	.286	9	48
2B	Jerry Coleman	121	362	90	.249	3	43
3B	Bobby Brown	103	313	84	.268	6	51
SS	Phil Rizzuto	144	540	148	.274	2	43
OF	Gene Woodling	120	420	118	.281	15	71
OF	Joe DiMaggio	116	415	109	.263	12	71
OF	Hank Bauer	118	348	103	.296	10	54

==== Other batters ====
Note: G = Games played; AB = At bats; H = Hits; Avg. = Batting average; HR = Home runs; RBI = Runs batted in

Player	G	AB	H	Avg.	HR	RBI
Gil McDougald	131	402	123	.306	14	63
Mickey Mantle	96	341	91	.267	13	65
Johnny Mize	113	332	86	.259	10	49
Jackie Jensen	56	168	50	.298	8	25
Johnny Hopp	46	63	13	.206	2	4
Billy Martin	51	58	15	.259	0	2
Cliff Mapes	45	51	11	.216	2	8
Charlie Silvera	18	51	14	.275	1	7
Billy Johnson	15	40	12	.300	0	4
Bob Cerv	12	28	6	.214	0	2
Jim Brideweser	2	8	3	.375	0	0
Ralph Houk	3	5	1	.200	0	2
Archie Wilson	4	4	0	.000	0	0
Clint Courtney	1	2	0	.000	0	0

=== Pitching ===
==== Starting pitchers ====
Note: G = Games pitched; IP = Innings pitched; W = Wins; L = Losses; ERA = Earned run average; SO = Strikeouts

Player	G	IP	W	L	ERA	SO
Vic Raschi	35	258.1	21	10	3.27	164
Ed Lopat	31	234.2	21	9	2.91	93
Allie Reynolds	40	221.0	17	8	3.05	126
Bob Wiesler	4	9.1	0	2	13.50	3

==== Other pitchers ====
Note: G = Games pitched; IP = Innings pitched; W = Wins; L = Losses; ERA = Earned run average; SO = Strikeouts

Player	G	IP	W	L	ERA	SO
Tom Morgan	27	124.2	9	3	3.68	57
Spec Shea	25	95.2	5	5	4.33	38
Bob Kuzava	23	82.1	8	4	2.40	50
Art Schallock	11	46.1	3	1	3.88	19
Stubby Overmire	15	44.2	1	1	4.63	14
Jack Kramer	19	40.2	1	3	4.65	15
Johnny Sain	7	37.0	2	1	4.14	21
Fred Sanford	11	26.2	0	3	3.71	10
Tommy Byrne	9	21.0	2	1	6.86	14

==== Relief pitchers ====
Note: G = Games pitched; W = Wins; L = Losses; SV = Saves; ERA = Earned run average; SO = Strikeouts

Player	G	W	L	SV	ERA	SO
Joe Ostrowski	34	6	4	5	3.49	30
Tom Ferrick	9	1	1	1	7.50	3
Bobby Hogue	7	1	0	0	0.00	2
Bob Muncrief	2	0	0	0	9.00	2
Ernie Nevel	1	0	0	1	0.00	1
Bob Porterfield	2	0	0	0	15.00	2

== 1951 World Series ==
AL New York Yankees (4) vs. NL New York Giants (2)

Game	Score	Date	Location	Attendance
1	Giants – 5, Yankees – 1	October 4	Yankee Stadium	65,673
2	Giants – 1, Yankees – 3	October 5	Yankee Stadium	66,018
3	Yankees – 2, Giants – 6	October 6	Polo Grounds	52,035
4	Yankees – 6, Giants – 2	October 8	Polo Grounds	49,010
5	Yankees – 13, Giants – 1	October 9	Polo Grounds	47,530
6	Giants – 3, Yankees – 4	October 10	Yankee Stadium	61,711

== Awards and honors ==
- Yogi Berra, American League MVP
- Phil Rizzuto, Babe Ruth Award

All-Star Game

- Yogi Berra - Starter

== Farm system ==
Level	Team	League	Manager
AAA	Kansas City Blues	American Association	George Selkirk
AAA	San Francisco Seals	Pacific Coast League	Lefty O'Doul
AA	Beaumont Roughnecks	Texas League	Harry Craft
A	Muskegon Clippers	Central League	Jim Gleeson
A	Binghamton Triplets	Eastern League	Bill Skiff
B	Quincy Gems	Illinois–Indiana–Iowa League	Dutch Zwilling
B	Norfolk Tars	Piedmont League	Mayo Smith
C	Amsterdam Rugmakers	Canadian–American League	Frank Novosel
C	Twin Falls Cowboys	Pioneer League	Don Trower
C	Joplin Miners	Western Association	Billy Holm
D	LaGrange Troupers	Georgia–Alabama League	Carl Cooper
D	Newark Yankees	Ohio–Indiana League	Bunny Mick
D	McAlester Rockets	Sooner State League	Vern Hoscheit
D	Fond du Lac Panthers	Wisconsin State League	James Adlam

LEAGUE CHAMPIONS: Quincy, Norfolk, LaGrange, McAlester

Newark club folded, July 17, 1951
