= Marv Rotblatt =

American baseball player (1927–2013)

- Pitcher
- Born: October 18, 1927; Chicago, Illinois, U.S.
- Died: July 16, 2013 (aged 85); Chicago, Illinois, U.S.
- Batted: Switch Threw: Left

MLB debut
- July 4, 1948, for the Chicago White Sox

Last MLB appearance
- July 22, 1951, for the Chicago White Sox

MLB statistics
- Win–loss record: 4–3
- Earned run average: 4.82
- Strikeouts: 30
- Stats at Baseball Reference

Teams
- Chicago White Sox (1948, 1950–1951)

Marvin Rotblatt (October 18, 1927 – July 16, 2013), nicknamed "Rotty", was an American left-handed pitcher in Major League Baseball for the Chicago White Sox in the 1948, 1950 and 1951 seasons. His ERAs in 1948 (7.85) and 1950 (6.23) were the highest in the majors. He failed to get a base hit in fifteen career at-bats.

== Biography ==
Rotblatt was born in Chicago, where his father, a Jewish immigrant from Poland, owned a lamp business. He was Jewish.

He attended Von Steuben High School in Chicago. Before playing professional baseball, Rotblatt played for the University of Illinois at Urbana-Champaign. The 1947–48 team won the Big Nine Championship.

His minor league Southern Association record included a season-high 202 strikeouts and a no-hitter.

Listed at 5 feet 7 inches (1.70 m) tall, Rotblatt has been considered one of the shortest pitchers in Major League history. As a result, in 1951 he appeared on You Bet Your Life, the television quiz show hosted by Groucho Marx, after being selected at an audition over his pitching teammate Bob Cain, who knew something about short players. While pitching for the 1951 Detroit Tigers, Cain walked Eddie Gaedel, a 3 ft 6 in (1.07 m) pinch hitter signed by St. Louis Browns owner Bill Veeck, also a showman who enjoyed staging publicity stunts.

In 1964, students at Carleton College in Northfield, Minnesota named an intramural slow-pitch softball league after Rotblatt. Although traditional intramural softball is still played at Carleton, the name Rotblatt now refers to an annual beer softball game that is played with one inning for every year of the school's over 150-year existence.

== See also ==
- List of Jewish Major League Baseball players
