= Ozark Ike =

American comic strips

- Ray Gotto's Ozark Ike (December 21, 1947)
- Author: Ray Gotto
- Current status/schedule: Concluded
- Launch date: November 12, 1945
- End date: September 14, 1958
- Syndicate(s): King Features Syndicate
- Genre: Humor

Ozark Ike is a newspaper comic strip about dumb but likable Ozark Ike McBatt, a youth from a rural area in the mountains. The strip was created by Rufus A. ("Ray") Gotto while he was serving in the Navy during World War II in Washington, D.C. as an illustrator for Navy instruction manuals. The strip ran from November 12, 1945, to September 14, 1958.

== Characters and story ==
Strong-but-simple Ike McBatt is from a hillbilly family living in the small backwoods community of Wildweed Run (pop. 49). Ozark Ike is an all-around athlete, playing baseball, football and basketball. Between seasons, he enters the boxing ring. The characters and the baseball park settings are apparently inspired by Ring Lardner's well-known baseball short story "Alibi Ike" (1915), filmed in 1935 as the comedy Alibi Ike, starring Joe E. Brown in the title role and Olivia de Havilland in her film debut.

Ozark Ike's girlfriend is Dinah Fatfield, whose family has been involved in a feud with the McBatt clan for several generations. As is evident in the names, this background situation was inspired by the Hatfield-McCoy feud.

== Personnel ==
Gotto is famous for using extreme perspectives to achieve great drama and action in sports. As such Ozark Ike attracted publisher Stephen Slesinger's attention. Slesinger also owned Red Ryder, King of the Royal Mounted, US and Canadian rights to Winnie-the-Pooh, and had exclusive licensing arrangements for other notable fictional characters including Tarzan and all of the NEA newspaper comics. Slesinger produced the cartoon for distribution through King Features Syndicate, and it debuted November 12, 1945.

One of the assistants on the strip was Fred Rhoads. Gotto left in 1954 to start his creator-owned baseball strip Cotton Woods syndicated by General Features, but Ozark Ike continued until 1959 under Bill Lignante and George Olesen. Lignante was also a leading courtroom artist for network television, and is most famous as the artist who created hundreds of drawings of famous patrons that decorate the Palm Restaurants.

Gotto eventually went on to design the New York Mets logo.

"Ozark Ike" was the nickname of major league baseball player Gus Zernial.
