= Walt Kellner =

American baseball player

- Pitcher
- Born: April 26, 1929; Tucson, Arizona, U.S.
- Died: June 19, 2006 (aged 77); Tucson, Arizona, U.S.
- Batted: Right Threw: Right

MLB debut
- September 6, 1952, for the Philadelphia Athletics

Last MLB appearance
- September 11, 1953, for the Philadelphia Athletics

MLB statistics
- Win–loss record: 0–0
- Earned run average: 6.43
- Strikeouts: 6
- Innings pitched: 7
- Stats at Baseball Reference

Teams
- Philadelphia Athletics (1952–1953)

Career highlights and awards
- Earned a save in his first Major League game, 1952

Walter Joseph Kellner (April 26, 1929 – June 19, 2006) was an American relief pitcher in Major League Baseball who had an eight-year professional career, and played three games in the Major Leagues for the Philadelphia Athletics between 1952 and 1953. Kellner, 6 feet (1.8 metres) tall and weighing 200 pounds (91 kg) during his career, batted and threw right-handed.

Kellner signed with the Athletics as an amateur free agent in 1949. He started out with Lincoln in the Western League, winning three games and losing fourteen in his first pro season. He served in the military in 1951 and part of 1952, but returned to baseball late in 1952 and debuted with Philadelphia on September 6 of that year. In his very first game, he picked up a save, facing 19 batters over four innings pitched and giving up four hits and three runs. He played two more games the following year, allowing one hit and two runs over three innings.

Kellner played several more years in the minors before retiring in 1958. He died in his hometown of Tucson, Arizona, on June 19, 2006.

== Family ==
The last of three sons (four children) of John Justus and Julietta (Garcia) Kellner, in Tucson, Arizona. His paternal great-grandfather, Johann Justus Kellner, a German immigrant, had arrived in central Texas in 1845. His older brother, Alex, also was a major league pitcher. The two were teammates in 1952 and 1953.
