= Skeeter Kell =

American baseball player

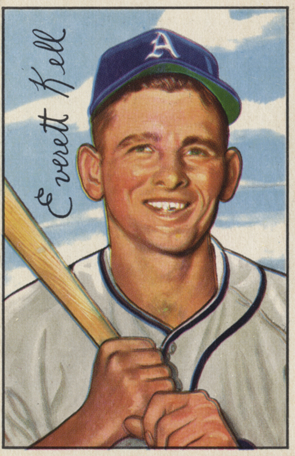
- Second baseman
- Born: October 11, 1929; Swifton, Arkansas, U.S.
- Died: May 28, 2015 (aged 85); Newport, Arkansas, U.S.
- Batted: Right Threw: Right

MLB debut
- April 19, 1952, for the Philadelphia Athletics

Last MLB appearance
- September 26, 1952, for the Philadelphia Athletics

MLB statistics
- Batting average: .221
- Home runs: 0
- Runs batted in: 17
- Stats at Baseball Reference

Teams
- Philadelphia Athletics (1952)

Everett Lee "Skeeter" Kell (October 11, 1929 – May 28, 2015) was an American Major League Baseball second baseman.

The younger brother of Hall of Famer George Kell, Skeeter played college baseball at the Arkansas Razorbacks baseball from 1948 to 1951. He played one major league season, 1952, for the Philadelphia Athletics, splitting time at second base with Cass Michaels and Pete Suder.
