= Doug Hansen (baseball) =

American baseball player (1928–1999)

- Pinch runner
- Born: December 16, 1928; Los Angeles, California, U.S.
- Died: September 16, 1999 (aged 70); Orem, Utah, U.S.
- Batted: Right Threw: Right

MLB debut
- September 4, 1951, for the Cleveland Indians

Last MLB appearance
- September 11, 1951, for the Cleveland Indians

MLB statistics
- Games played: 3
- Runs scored: 2
- Stats at Baseball Reference

Teams
- Cleveland Indians (1951)

Douglas William Hansen (December 16, 1928 – September 16, 1999) was an American professional baseball player whose career extended from 1947–1951, 1953–1954 and 1956. All but three games of his 728-game professional career were in minor league baseball. He appeared in three Major League contests as a pinch runner for the 1951 Cleveland Indians and scored two runs.

Hansen was an infielder by trade. Born in Los Angeles, California, he stood 6 feet (1.8 m) tall, weighed 180 pounds (82 kg) and threw and batted right-handed. In September 1950, he made his three pinch-running appearances for Cleveland. In his first game, an extra-inning contest against the Chicago White Sox on September 4, he pinch run for Indians pitcher Early Wynn — who had reached base as a pinch hitter. Hansen failed to score as Chicago won, 3–1. In his next two appearances, on September 7 and 11, each time running for veteran catcher Birdie Tebbetts, Hansen scored his two MLB runs.
