= Jack Littrell =

American baseball player (1929–2009)

- Shortstop
- Born: January 22, 1929; Louisville, Kentucky, U.S.
- Died: June 9, 2009 (aged 80); Louisville, Kentucky, U.S.
- Batted: Right Threw: Right

MLB debut
- April 19, 1952, for the Philadelphia Athletics

Last MLB appearance
- September 15, 1957, for the Chicago Cubs

MLB statistics
- Batting average: .204
- Home runs: 2
- Runs batted in: 17
- Stats at Baseball Reference

Teams
- Philadelphia/Kansas City Athletics (1952, 1954–1955); Chicago Cubs (1957)

Jack Napier Littrell (January 22, 1929 – June 9, 2009) was an American Major League Baseball (MLB) shortstop in the 1950s. Listed at 6 feet 0 inches (1.83 m) and 179 pounds (81 kg), he batted and threw right-handed.

== Career ==
Born in Louisville, Kentucky, in 1929, Littrell initially signed with the Boston Red Sox in 1948, and played in Boston's farm system during the 1948 and 1949 seasons. In a New York–Penn League game (then known as the PONY League) on August 15, 1949, he hit four home runs, coming on consecutive at bats. Littrell moved to the Philadelphia Athletics prior to the 1950 season, and played in the Athletics' minor league system from 1950 through 1954.

Littrell played in MLB with Philadelphia in 1952 and 1954, staying with the franchise in 1955 when the team relocated as the Kansas City Athletics. The Athletics sold him to the Brooklyn Dodgers in December 1955. Littrell played in the Dodgers' minor league organization during the 1956 season, and then played his final season in MLB in 1957, as a member of the Chicago Cubs. Littrell completed his professional career in the minors for Chicago in 1958, Kansas City in 1959, and for the Milwaukee Braves from 1960 through 1962. He appeared in a total of 111 MLB games, batting .204 with two home runs and 17 RBIs. Defensively, he appeared at all four infield positions, with most of his games (80) at shortstop.

== Personal life ==
Littrell's first wife, Margaret, died on January 1, 1954, due to injuries in a New Year's Eve automobile accident in Kentucky. Littrell and the couple's two children were also in the car; Littrell and their daughter were not injured, while their son sustained a broken leg. Littrell later remarried; he and his second wife, Sally Mae, had a daughter and two sons.

Littrell died on June 9, 2009, of natural causes. His son, a pitcher also named Jack, was drafted by the Dodgers in 1977 and his grandson Corey Littrell was drafted in 2013 by the Red Sox as a pitcher.
