= Bubba Harris (baseball) =

American baseball player (1926–2013)

- Pitcher
- Born: February 15, 1926; Sulligent, Alabama, U.S.
- Died: January 12, 2013 (aged 86); Nobleton, Florida, U.S.
- Batted: Right Threw: Right

MLB debut
- April 29, 1948, for the Philadelphia Athletics

Last MLB appearance
- May 7, 1951, for the Cleveland Indians

MLB statistics
- Win–loss record: 6–3
- Earned run average: 4.84
- Strikeouts: 53
- Stats at Baseball Reference

Teams
- Philadelphia Athletics (1948–1949, 1951); Cleveland Indians (1951)

Charles "Bubba" Harris (February 15, 1926 – January 12, 2013) was an American professional baseball pitcher. A right-hander, he played in all or parts of three seasons in Major League Baseball (MLB) for the Philadelphia Athletics (1948–1949, 1951) and Cleveland Indians (1951). Listed as 6 feet 4 inches (1.93 m) tall and 204 pounds (93 kg), Harris was born in Sulligent, Alabama; he graduated from Jones Valley High School and attended the University of Alabama.

Harris' pro career began at the age of 17 in the low minor leagues. He appeared in 51 games in 1943 and 1944 before entering the United States Navy for World War II service. Acquired by the Athletics in 1947, he made his major league debut the following season, when, on April 29, 1948, he retired the Boston Red Sox in order during the eighth inning of the Red Sox' 11–5 victory at Shibe Park. Harris went on to lead the first-division Athletics in games pitched with 45—all of them as a reliever—and tied for the team lead in saves (then an unofficial statistic), with five. He posted a 5–2 won–lost record and a 4.13 earned run average in 932/3 innings pitched; all would be career bests. In 1949, Harris' effectiveness diminished and his production fell off: in 37 games, he split two decisions, had three saves, and saw his ERA rise to 5.44.

Harris then spent 1950 back in the minor leagues before a brief return to the majors in early 1951, working in three games for Philadelphia and two for Cleveland before rosters were cut from 28 to 25 men in mid-May. His minor league career continued into 1956. As a big-leaguer, Harris won six of nine decisions with eight saves and a 4.84 career ERA. In 87 games, all of them in relief, he permitted 190 hits and 86 bases on balls in 186 innings pitched. He struck out 53. He died in Nobleton, Florida, at the age of 86.
