= Johnny Kucab =

American baseball player (1919-1977)

- Pitcher
- Born: December 17, 1919; Olyphant, Pennsylvania, U.S.
- Died: May 26, 1977 (aged 57); Campbell, Ohio, U.S.
- Batted: Right Threw: Right

MLB debut
- September 14, 1950, for the Philadelphia Athletics

Last MLB appearance
- September 1, 1952, for the Philadelphia Athletics

MLB statistics
- Win–loss record: 5–5
- Earned run average: 4.44
- Strikeouts: 48
- Stats at Baseball Reference

Teams
- Philadelphia Athletics (1950–1952)

John Albert Kucab (December 17, 1919 – May 26, 1977) was an American professional baseball pitcher who is best known for leading the Philadelphia Athletics to victory in Connie Mack's last game as a Major League Baseball (MLB) manager on October 1, 1950.

== Early years ==
Kucab was born in Olyphant, Pennsylvania. He threw and batted right-handed, stood 6 feet 2 inches (1.88 m) tall and weighed 185 pounds (84 kg). In 1940, he signed with the Cincinnati Reds and began his minor-league apprenticeship. After missing most of his debut pro season with an injury, he won ten games in 1941 for the Harrisonburg Turks of the Class C Virginia League and, according to his 1977 obituary, "seemed headed to stardom".

World War II intervened, however, and Kucab would spend 47 months in the United States Army, where he saw active duty in both the European and Pacific theaters. His obituary states that his four years in the military may have "kept him from attaining a longer stay in the major leagues".

== Major league career ==
The Reds released Kucab following the war, and Kucab signed with the Pittsburgh Pirates' organization. In 1946, his first of four consecutive seasons pitching for Youngstown of the Class C Middle Atlantic League, Kucab posted a 12–1 record. Two losing seasons followed; however, in 1949, the 29-year-old Kucab led the Middle Atlantic League in wins with 21 (he lost seven) and was named to his circuit's All-Star team. With his major-league rights now held by the Philadelphia Athletics, Kucab moved up in the Philadelphia farm system. In 1950, he won another 16 games for the Lincoln A's of the Class A Western League. The stellar season earned him a September call-up to Mack's Athletics.

Kucab made his major league debut at age 30 on September 14, 1950, throwing five innings of scoreless relief against the Chicago White Sox at Comiskey Park. Ten days later, he made a start against the Washington Senators and hurled a complete game, but was saddled with a 3–2 defeat. One week later, on October 1 at Shibe Park, Kucab started again in a rematch with Washington on the final day of the regular season. He tossed another complete game, but this time he came away with a 5–3 victory, allowing 12 hits but only three earned runs. It was Kucab's first MLB victory but an "historic achievement" as Mack's 3,729th and final win as a big-league manager in a 53-year career that included a half century with the Athletics. The ball used is currently housed in the Baseball Hall of Fame, at Cooperstown, New York.

Kucab was able to remain with Philadelphia for the full seasons of 1951 and 1952, almost exclusively as a relief pitcher. In 59 career major-league games, he split ten decisions, earned five saves, and posted a 4.44 career earned run average. In 152 innings pitched, he surrendered 169 hits and 51 bases on balls, with 48 strikeouts.

== Later years ==
He returned to the minors in 1953 and pitched through 1958. His obituary stated: "Among his top performances in baseball is a string of 19 straight wins while pitching for Ralph Houk at a New York Yankees farm team".

As his career wound down, Kucab settled in Youngstown, Ohio, where he had met his wife, Mary, in 1946. During the last decade of his life, he was associated with Youngstown's Hovanec Distributing Company. In 1977, John Kucab died of a heart attack at his home in neighboring Campbell; he was 57.
