= Eddie Joost =

American baseball player and manager (1916–2011)

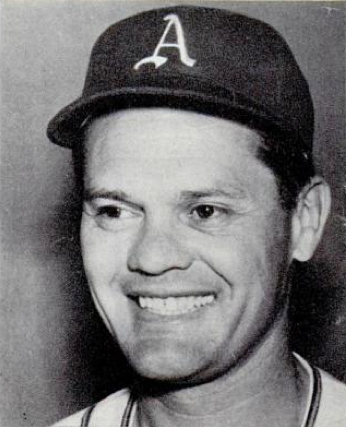
- Joost in 1954
- Shortstop / Manager
- Born: June 5, 1916; San Francisco, California, U.S.
- Died: April 12, 2011 (aged 94); Fair Oaks, California, U.S.
- Batted: Right Threw: Right

MLB debut
- September 11, 1936, for the Cincinnati Reds

Last MLB appearance
- September 25, 1955, for the Boston Red Sox

MLB statistics
- Batting average: .239
- Home runs: 134
- Runs batted in: 601
- Stats at Baseball Reference

Teams
- As player: Cincinnati Reds (1936–1937, 1939–1942); Boston Braves (1943, 1945); Philadelphia Athletics (1947–1954); Boston Red Sox (1955); As manager: Philadelphia Athletics (1954)

Career highlights and awards
- 2× All-Star (1949, 1952); World Series champion (1940); Athletics Hall of Fame; Philadelphia Baseball Wall of Fame

Edwin David Joost (June 5, 1916 – April 12, 2011) was an American professional baseball player and manager. He played as a shortstop in Major League Baseball for all or portions of 17 seasons between 1936 and 1955. In 1954, Joost became the third and last manager in the 54-year history of the Philadelphia Athletics. Under Joost, the A's finished last in the American League and lost over 100 games. After that season, they relocated to Kansas City.

An outstanding defensive player, the right-handed-hitting Joost hit for power but struck out at a higher rate for his era. In a 17-year major league playing career (1936–37; 1939–43; 1945; 1947–55) for the Cincinnati Reds, Boston Braves, Athletics and Boston Red Sox, Joost smashed 134 home runs, with a batting average of .239 and 601 RBI.

== Career ==
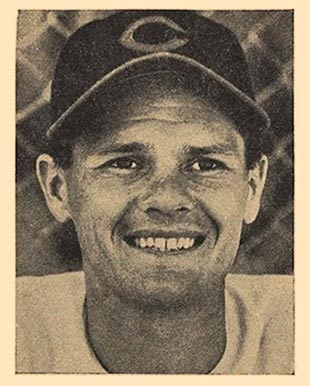
Joost in 1940

During a 1941 game with the Reds, Joost fielded 19 balls at shortstop, recording 9 put-outs and 10 assists. In 1943, as a Boston Brave, Joost batted .185 in 421 at bats.

His somewhat high strikeout rate notwithstanding, Joost was a central figure in the brief revival of the Athletics in the late 1940s. For three seasons — 1947 through 1949 — the A's, after over a decade of futility, played over .500 baseball. Joost was their regular shortstop and one of the team's leaders. He twice hit over 20 home runs, and batted .289 in 1951.

Joost was an integral part of an Athletics' infield that registered the still-unmatched feat of turning more than 200 double plays in three consecutive seasons, between 1949–51. The Athletics' 1949 season mark of 217 double plays remains the all-time best in Major League history. One factor contributing to Joost's performance with the A's was his decision to wear eyeglasses on the field, which he had avoided earlier in his career because of the negative stereotype of athletes with eyewear at the time. After speaking with A's manager Connie Mack, Joost began to wear his glasses while playing — and improved his hitting.

Despite his low lifetime batting average, Joost had excellent patience at the plate, resulting in six straight seasons of 100 walks or more, and a career on-base percentage of .361. In 1949, he had an OBP of .429, hitting 23 home runs, scoring 128 runs and walking 149 times.

But the Athletics' resurgence after World War II was brief. Beset by limited finances and a virtually non-existent farm system, Mack's team could not compete with the Yankees, Indians, and Red Sox. Mack, the team's Hall of Fame patriarch and manager, retired at age 87 after a disastrous 1950 campaign in which the A's finished dead last in the majors with a 52-102 record. Veteran Jimmy Dykes took the helm from 1951–53, and, thanks to the American League MVP, pitcher Bobby Shantz, sparked one last revival in 1952. But the A's fell to seventh in 1953, prompting Dykes' departure. To save money on paying a separate salary for a manager, Joost, who had appeared in only 51 games in 1953, became player-manager in 1954. He batted .362 in 47 at bats, but the team went 51–103 (.331), and Joost was fired after the season ended.

=== Later career ===
Joost continued his playing career as a utility infielder for the Red Sox in 1955, and in 1956 briefly managed the Pacific Coast League's San Francisco Seals, then the top BoSox farm club, in his hometown before leaving the game. He held the Athletics record by a shortstop for most home runs during a single season and in a career, before Miguel Tejada broke both records in 2002.

When the Oakland Athletics played the Philadelphia Phillies for the first time in interleague play in June 2003 at Veterans Stadium, the Phillies invited former-Philadelphia A's Joost and Gus Zernial to the games. When the Phillies played the Athletics in Oakland in June 2005, the A's invited Joost to throw out the first pitch before the series' opening game on June 17, 2005.

== Retirement ==
Joost was the last living member of the Reds team that won the 1940 World Series. At the time of his death, no living player had played on an earlier World Series-winning team. He died April 12, 2011, age 94 in Fair Oaks, California.

In August 2024, Joost was posthumously inducted into the Oakland Athletics Hall of Fame.

== See also ==
- List of Major League Baseball player–managers
- List of Major League Baseball ultimate grand slams
- Van Lingle Mungo (song)

Sporting positions
Preceded by Tommy Heath	San Francisco Seals manager 1956	Succeeded by Joe Gordon
