= Gus Zernial =

American baseball player (1923–2011)

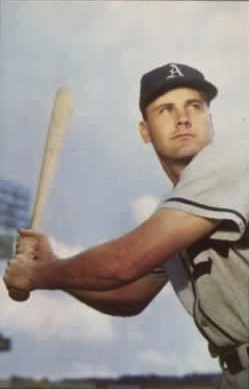
- Zernial with Philadelphia
- Left fielder
- Born: June 27, 1923; Beaumont, Texas, U.S.
- Died: January 20, 2011 (aged 87); Fresno, California, U.S.
- Batted: Right Threw: Right

MLB debut
- April 19, 1949, for the Chicago White Sox

Last MLB appearance
- September 25, 1959, for the Detroit Tigers

MLB statistics
- Batting average: .265
- Home runs: 237
- Runs batted in: 776
- Stats at Baseball Reference

Teams
- Chicago White Sox (1949–1951); Philadelphia / Kansas City Athletics (1951–1957); Detroit Tigers (1958–1959)

Career highlights and awards
- All-Star (1953); AL home run leader (1951); AL RBI leader (1951); Philadelphia Baseball Wall of Fame

Gus Edward Zernial (June 27, 1923 – January 20, 2011) was an American professional baseball player. He played as an outfielder in Major League Baseball, most notably for the Philadelphia Athletics with whom he remained when they moved west and became the Kansas City Athletics in 1955.

Nicknamed "Ozark Ike" after the popular comic strip character, Zernial was one of the most prolific power hitters of the 1950s, joining Hall of Famers Mickey Mantle, Yogi Berra and Larry Doby in the American League (AL) for most home runs in the decade. In 1951, he led the AL in home runs and all of Major League Baseball in runs batted in; and he was an All-Star in 1953. At one time he shared the record for most home runs by an MLB pinch hitter.

== Early life ==
Zernial was born on June 27, 1923, in Beaumont, Texas. He was one of ten children. He attended Beaumont High School, graduating in 1942, where he was nicknamed "Dutch". He was on the baseball, basketball, football and track teams, with basketball being his most noteworthy sport. He played first base on the baseball team, and also in semi pro baseball.

In 1942, Zernial played 95 games of Minor League Baseball (MiLB) with the Class D Waycroft Bears of the Georgia–Florida League. He had a .286 batting average, with three home runs. He did not play in he minor leagues again until 1946.

He entered the United States Navy in October 1942, at 6 ft (1.83 m) 179 lb (81.2 kg), and was in the service for three years during World War II. He served as an Armed Guard radio technician on liberty ships and tankers. When he left the Navy three years later, he was 6 ft 2½ in (1.89 m) 220 lb (99.8 kg).

== Professional career ==
=== Minor leagues ===
Zernial returned to MiLB play in 1946 with the Class C Burlington Bees of the Carolina League. He hit .333, with 41 home runs, 29 doubles, 111 runs batted in (RBI), 114 runs scored and a .649 slugging percentage. He led the Carolina League in home runs and slugging percentage, was fourth in batting average, and eighth in RBIs. His 41 home runs set a league record.

On November 1, 1946, the Cleveland Indians selected Zernial in the Rule 5 major league draft from Atlanta of the Double-A Southern Association. Atlanta owned his contract while he played for Burlington. Cleveland optioned him to the Triple-A Baltimore Orioles of the International League, but he was only there a short time in 1947. In late April, Cleveland sold Zernial's contract rights to the Chicago White Sox. In 1947, he played for the Triple-A Hollywood Stars of the Pacific Coast League (PCL), a Chicago White Sox affiliate. He had a .344 batting average with 12 home runs, 77 RBIs, 61 runs and a .919 OPS (on base plus slugging). His .344 batting average was fourth best in the PCL that season.

Before the start of the 1948 season, he tore muscles in his right leg during training camp. He returned to the Stars in 1948, batting .322 in 186 games played. He led the PCL in RBIs, was second in runs scored, third in home runs and sixth in slugging percentage. He had two home runs and five RBIs during a single inning of a game that season. While playing for the Stars he received the nickname "Ozark Ike", after a well known comic strip character, which would follow him throughout his career.

In 2003, Zernial said that there were many teams in the PCL that were more profitable than Major League teams at the time. He was making $8,000 in the PCL when Frank Lane offered him the $5,000 MLB minimum to play for the White Sox. Zernial told Lane he would rather stay in the PCL than play for less money with the White Sox. However, he accepted the pay cut and joined the White Sox.

Between the 1948 and 1949 seasons, he took sprinting lessons from University of Southern California track coach Dean Cromwell.

=== Major leagues ===
==== Chicago White Sox ====
Zernial was brought up to the White Sox in 1949, but was only able to play in 73 games after suffering a broken right collarbone in a game against Cleveland. He made a shoestring catch of a line drive in left field and fell on his right shoulder. He was leading the American League with a .355 batting average at the time of the injury. After returning, he hit .318, with five home runs, 38 RBIs, 29 runs and an .866 OPS on the season. He had the highest batting average, slugging percentage and OPS on the White Sox that season.

He played a full season in 1950, batting .280, with 29 home runs, 93 RBIs and an .815 OPS. He was fifth in the American League (AL) in home runs, and led the league in strikeouts with 110. His 29 home runs set a White Sox record. He played left field for the White Sox in 1949, without making an error in 46 games; and had a .969 fielding percentage as the White Sox left fielder in 1950. In 1951, he played only four games for the White Sox, before being traded.

==== Philadelphia Athletics ====
On April 30, 1951, the White Sox traded Zernial and Dave Philley to the Philadelphia Athletics as part of a three-team trade. (Zernial and Philley would room together on the A's.) The Athletics sent Lou Brissie to the Cleveland Indians, and sent Paul Lehner to the White Sox. Cleveland traded Sam Zoldak and Ray Murray to the Athletics, and Minnie Miñoso to the White Sox. The trade reunited Zernial with his Hollywood Stars manager, Jimmy Dykes. In 1951, he played 139 games with the A's, batting .274, with 33 home runs, 125 RBIs, 90 runs and an .875 OPS. He played in left field for the A's, with a .974 fielding percentage and 17 assists.

He led the AL in home runs (33) and all Major League players in RBIs (129), ahead of Ted Williams who was second in both categories. Zernial also led the AL in extra base hits (68) and strikeouts (101). Defensively he led all AL outfielders with a career-high 18 assists. He was 20th in AL Most Valuable Player voting. He had a batting average near .300 in 50 night games, but only .268 in day games that season. Zernial believed that night games required much more concentration when batting, but batters were subject to considerable sun glare playing day games in Chicago. He also believed switching between night and day games instead of steadily playing in one environment was difficult.

In 1952, he hit .262, with 29 home runs, 100 RBIs, 76 runs and an .799 OPS. He was fourth in the AL in RBIs and tied for fourth in home runs. He led AL left fielders in putouts (302) and errors (9), and was third in assists (6). In 1953, he hit .284, with a career-high 42 home runs, 108 RBIs, 85 runs and a .919 OPS. He was named to the AL All-Star Team for the first and only time in his career, and was the starter in left field, ahead of Ted Williams and Minnie Miñoso, and had one hit in the game. He finished 18th in voting for AL Most Valuable Player. He was second in the AL in home runs to Al Rosen's 43, second in slugging percentage (.559), third in OPS, and tied for fourth in RBIs with Yogi Berra. In 1953, he led all AL left fielders in putouts (303) and assists (17).

In July 1954, Zernial fractured his collarbone for the second time, this time on the left side. The injury occurred when he was diving in an effort to catch a line drive in left field, in a game against the Boston Red Sox. He was only able to play in 97 games that season, finishing with a .250 batting average, 14 home runs and 62 RBIs in 336 at bats.

The A's moved to Kansas City, Missouri before the 1955 season. Zernial played in 120 games, starting 102 in left field. He hit .254, with 30 home runs and 84 RBIs, in only 413 at bats. He was second in the AL to Micky Mantle in home runs (37) and eighth in RBIs. Mantle have over 100 more at bats than Zernial that season. In 1956, Zernial appeared in 109 games for the A's, but started only 68 in the field. He hit .224, with 16 home runs and 44 RBIs in 272 at bats. In 1957, he started 111 games in the field of the 131 games in which he appeared, batting .236, with 27 home runs and 69 RBIs. He was fifth in the AL in home runs.

==== Detroit Tigers ====
In November 1957, the A's traded Zernial, Billy Martin, Tom Morgan, Lou Skizas, Mickey McDermott and Tim Thompson to the Detroit Tigers for Bill Tuttle, Jim Small, Duke Maas, John Tsitouris, Frank House, Kent Hadley and a player to be named later (Jim McManus). Zernial finished his career in Detroit, primarily as an occasional starter in left field and first base, and as a pinch hitter. He started 24 games in left field of the 66 games in which he appeared for the Tigers in 1958, batting .323, with five home runs and 23 RBIs in 124 at bats. He led the AL with 15 pinch hits, three for home runs; and had a .395 average as a pinch hitter.

In 1959, his final season, Zernial started 31 games at first base for the Tigers, appearing in 60 games overall. He did not start a game that season until June 27, his 36th birthday. On that date, he hit two home runs in four at bats, with five RBIs. Before that day, he had only three hits in 17 pinch hitting appearances, with one home run and three RBIs. On June 29 he had three hits in five at bats with two doubles, and his batting average reached a season high .300. By the end of the season, however, he had a .227 batting average, with seven home runs and 26 RBIs in 132 at bats. The Tigers released him on October 26, 1959.

== Legacy and honors ==
Zernial was a career .265 hitter (1,093-for-4,131) with 237 home runs, 776 RBI, 572 runs, 159 doubles, 22 triples, 15 stolen bases and 383 bases on balls in 1,234 games. He is tied for 90th in MLB history for grand slam home runs (9). At one time, he held the career pinch hit home run record (10), along with Smoky Burgess and George Crowe, until Crowe hit his 11th pinch hit home run in May 1960. He hit the 9th most home runs (232) in the decade of the 1950s; with seven of the eight players above him being in the Hall of Fame. His 237 home runs in 4,562 plate appearances is the most for all retired players with less than 5,000 plate appearances in MLB history.

Zernial was the first player to hit three home runs in the final game of a season, a record matched by Dick Allen in 1968, and Evan Longoria and Dan Johnson in 2012. He was the first major leaguer to hit four home runs in the month of October during the regular season, since 1900, which he accomplished during a doubleheader on October 1, 1950. In 1980, Mike Schmidt became the first NL player to do so; and in 1985 they were joined by Ron Kittle, George Brett and Dave Parker, and then by Wally Joyner in 1987.

Sal Maglie, former star pitcher for the New York Giants, wrote that Zernial had a "pretty big" strike zone, due to his stand-up posture when he was at the plate. An aggressive fielder, Zernial twice (1949 and 1954) broke his collarbone while making diving catches.

Zernial is featured in one of the most unusual baseball cards of all time. His 1952 Topps card shows Zernial holding a bat that has six baseballs attached to it. This photo recognized that he had tied an American League record by hitting six home runs in three consecutive games from May 13–16, 1951. The day after the picture was taken, he hit his seventh home run in a fourth consecutive game, tying a record set by Tony Lazzeri. Later in life, Zernial appeared at baseball memorabilia shows.

In 2001, Zernial was added to the Philadelphia Baseball Wall of Fame. In 2002, he was named to the Philadelphia Athletics All-Century Team. When the Oakland Athletics played the Philadelphia Phillies for the first time in interleague play in June 2003 at Veterans Stadium, the Phillies invited former Philadelphia A's Eddie Joost and Zernial to the games and recognized them prior to the first game. He is a member of the Fresno Athletic Hall of Fame.

=== Z facts ===
Zernial has the third most home runs of all time among players whose last name begins with the letter Z. His 237 are third only to Todd Zeile who finished his career with 253 and Ryan Zimmerman who finished his career with 284. The only other Z players with more than 100 home runs are retired players Richie Zisk (207), Ben Zobrist (167) and Mike Zunino (149).

Zernial and Al Zarilla teamed up in April 1951 to become the only players whose last names started with "Z" to play together in the same outfield. Zernial and Zarilla played left and right field, respectively, as part of a White Sox outfield unit in the first four games of the 1951 season, before Zernial was traded to the Philadelphia A's at the end of April. Zarilla batted third and Zernial cleanup in the White Sox batting order.

== Personal life and death ==
In early 1950, he was recruited to appear in the motion picture, Kill The Umpire. He declined the role because he was focused on rehabilitating from his 1949 collarbone injury so he would be ready to play and be productive in the 1950 season.

He was sometimes referred to as the "new DiMaggio". Zernial figured, coincidentally, in Joe DiMaggio meeting his legendary future wife Marilyn Monroe. The "handsome" young Zernial was chosen to pose with rising star Monroe in a movie-studio publicity shot. DiMaggio was so struck by Marilyn in the photo, as well as so envious of Zernial's opportunity, that he asked the rival outfielder how to reach Marilyn.

After retiring, he and his family ultimately moved to Clovis, California, near Fresno in the San Joaquin Valley. He did television commercials and was a sports anchor at ABC30 in Fresno. He did radio play-by-play for Fresno State University's sports teams. Zernial later was very involved in bringing a new minor league baseball team, the Fresno Grizzlies, and a new baseball stadium, Chukchanski Park, to Fresno.

Zernial was diagnosed with cancer in 1990. He had almost died from cancer in 1992, even receiving last rites. He died on January 20, 2011, from complications related to congestive heart failure.

== See also ==
- List of Major League Baseball career home run leaders
- List of Major League Baseball annual home run leaders
- List of Major League Baseball annual runs batted in leaders
