= Dave Philley =

American baseball player (1920–2012)

- Philley as an Oriole, 1955
- Outfielder
- Born: May 16, 1920; Paris, Texas, U.S.
- Died: March 15, 2012 (aged 91); Paris, Texas, U.S.
- Batted: Both Threw: Right

MLB debut
- September 6, 1941, for the Chicago White Sox

Last MLB appearance
- August 6, 1962, for the Boston Red Sox

MLB statistics
- Batting average: .270
- Home runs: 84
- Runs batted in: 729
- Stats at Baseball Reference

Teams
- Chicago White Sox (1941, 1946–1951); Philadelphia Athletics (1951–1953); Cleveland Indians (1954–1955); Baltimore Orioles (1955–1956); Chicago White Sox (1956–1957); Detroit Tigers (1957); Philadelphia Phillies (1958–1960); San Francisco Giants (1960); Baltimore Orioles (1960–1961); Boston Red Sox (1962)

David Earl Philley (May 16, 1920 – March 15, 2012) was an American professional baseball outfielder who played in Major League Baseball. A switch hitter who threw right-handed, he debuted on September 6, 1941 and played his final game on August 6, 1962. He was born in Paris, Texas and attended East Texas State University prior to his MLB career.

Philley played for eight different teams in a long, 18-season career. He led American League outfielders in assists three different years (1948, 1950, 1953) and once in outs (1950).

Philley reached the majors in 1941 with the Chicago White Sox. He spent four years as a military policeman during World War II, rejoining the White Sox in 1946 and playing 17 games for them that year. Philley was with the White Sox for five-and-a-half years before moving to the Philadelphia Athletics early in the 1951 season. After playing for Philadelphia in the 1951 through 1953 seasons, he next played for the Cleveland Indians in 1954. He was acquired by the Baltimore Orioles during the 1955 season and finished the year with a .299 batting average, leading the Orioles in batting. Later in his long career, Philley played for the Detroit Tigers, Philadelphia Phillies, San Francisco Giants, and Boston Red Sox, including second stints with Chicago and Baltimore. His most productive season came in 1953 with the Athletics, when he posted career-high numbers in batting average (.303), hits (188), doubles (30), and games played (157). From 1947 to 1953, he averaged 27 doubles per season, and in 1950 with Chicago hit 14 home runs with 80 runs batted in, also career highs. While in Cleveland, he appeared in the 1954 World Series.

As he got older, Philley became more of a pinch-hitting specialist. In 1958, playing for the Phillies, he collected 18 pinch hits, including a streak of eight straight to close the season.

Philley holds his Orioles' "Most Valuable Player" trophy, awarded in 1955 for leading the club in hitting with a .299 batting average

He also had a pinch-hit double opening day 1959, for an actual total of nine straight, a major league record that still stands today. While playing for Baltimore in 1961, he had a season total of 24 pinch hits in 72 at-bats, which are both American League records.

A 42-year-old Philley was signed off the Baltimore roster by the expansion Houston Colt .45's during the 1961–62 offseason, but a few hours later, Houston sent him to the Boston Red Sox. Philley spent most of 1962 on the bench for Boston until he was released on August 14, 1962.

In an 18-season career, Philley was a .270 hitter with 84 home runs and 729 RBI in 1,904 games. He also collected 1,700 hits, 276 doubles, 72 triples, 789 runs, 101 stolen bases, and a walk-to-strikeout ratio of 1.078 (594 to 551). Defensively, he recorded a .982 fielding percentage playing at all three outfield positions and at first and third base. As a pinch hitter, he batted .299 (92-for-308) with two home runs and 57 RBI in that role.

Philley holds the record for the most at-bats in an American League regulation-inning doubleheader, having 13 at-bats for the White Sox against the Browns on May 30, 1950.

After his playing days, Philley worked as a manager for the Houston minor league system from 1963 to 1964, and spent 1965 managing the Durham Bulls, where he won a Carolina League division title. He found employment for 1966 in the Red Sox organization, where he managed the Class A Waterloo Hawks and served as a scout. Until his death, Philley lived in his native Paris, Texas.

== See also ==
- Major League Baseball single-season pinch-hit records
