= Jimmy Dykes =

American baseball player, coach, and manager (1896–1976)

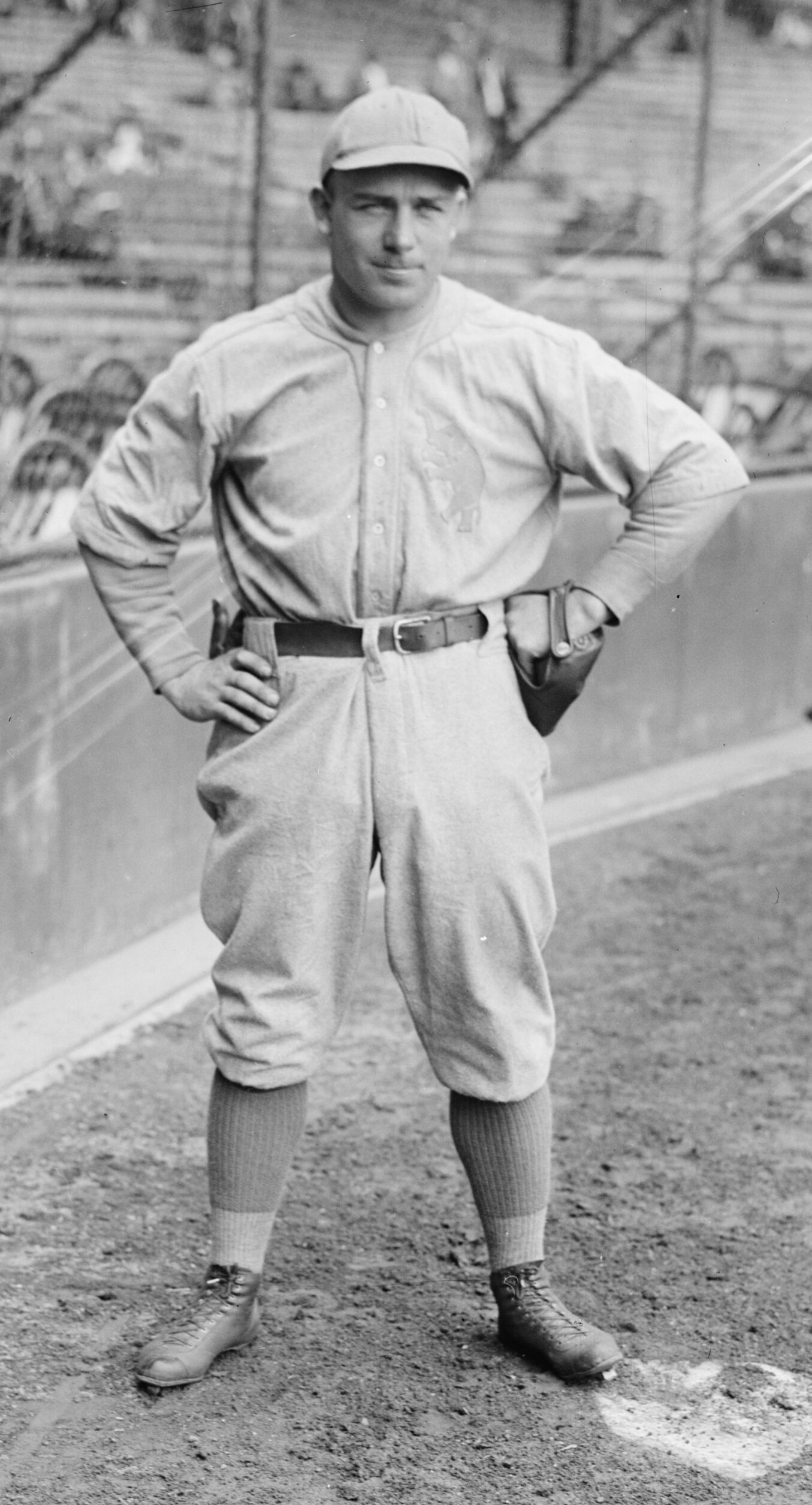
- Dykes in 1923
- Third baseman / Second baseman / Manager
- Born: November 10, 1896; Philadelphia, Pennsylvania, U.S.
- Died: June 15, 1976 (aged 79); Philadelphia, Pennsylvania, U.S.
- Batted: Right Threw: Right

MLB debut
- May 6, 1918, for the Philadelphia Athletics

Last MLB appearance
- October 1, 1939, for the Chicago White Sox

MLB statistics
- Batting average: .280
- Hits: 2,256
- Home runs: 108
- Runs batted in: 1,069
- Managerial record: 1,406–1,541
- Winning %: .477
- Stats at Baseball Reference

Teams
- As player: Philadelphia Athletics (1918–1932); Chicago White Sox (1933–1939); As manager: Chicago White Sox (1934–1946); Philadelphia Athletics (1951–1953); Baltimore Orioles (1954); Cincinnati Redlegs (1958); Detroit Tigers (1959–1960); Cleveland Indians (1960–1961); As coach: Philadelphia Athletics (1949–1950); Cincinnati Redlegs (1955–1958); Pittsburgh Pirates (1959); Milwaukee Braves (1962); Kansas City Athletics (1963–1964)

Career highlights and awards
- 2× All-Star (1933, 1934); 2× World Series champion (1929, 1930); Philadelphia Baseball Wall of Fame

James Joseph Dykes (November 10, 1896 – June 15, 1976) was an American professional baseball player, coach and manager. He played in Major League Baseball as a third and second baseman from 1918 through 1939, most notably as a member of the Philadelphia Athletics dynasty that won three consecutive American League pennants from 1929 to 1931 and, won the World Series in 1929 and 1930. Dykes played his final six seasons for the Chicago White Sox.

Dykes batted over .300 five times during his career and was a member of one of the most feared batting orders in the history of baseball, featuring three future Baseball Hall of Fame members (Al Simmons, Jimmie Foxx, and Mickey Cochrane). He also excelled as a defensive player, leading the American League in assists once at second base and twice at third base, ending his career sixth in AL history in games at third base (1,253), and seventh in putouts (1,361), assists (2,403), total chances (3,952) and double plays (199).

At the time of his retirement, Dykes ranked eighth in American League history in games played (2,282), and ninth in at bats (8,046). He holds the Athletics franchise record for career doubles (365), and formerly held team marks for career games and at bats.

After his playing career, Dykes became the winningest manager in Chicago White Sox history, with 899 victories over parts of 13 seasons, though his teams never finished above third place; he later became the first manager in history to win 1,000 games without capturing a league pennant.

== Early life ==
Born in Philadelphia, Dykes played for three local teams at age 16 in 1913. The first was "his father's Penn Street Boys Club"; the second one paid 50 cents a game plus carfare (to Ardmore on the Main Line); the third paid $1 a game. By 19, Dykes played in the Delaware County League, which the major leagues declared an outlaw league a few years later, for infringing their control of the professional sport.

== Major league career ==
Dykes began his major league career on May 6, 1918, as a second baseman for the Athletics, and served in the wartime Army after the season ended. He spent most of 1919 in the minor leagues after reporting out of shape in spring training, but quickly became one of manager Connie Mack's favorite players with his defensive versatility and easygoing manner, and remained with the club for the next 14 years, primarily at third base.

With powerful wrists and reputedly the sport's best throwing arm, Dykes took advantage of Shibe Park's friendly dimensions to finish among the league leaders in home runs in 1921 and 1922, and batted .312, .323, and .324 in 1924, 1925 and 1927. He was named team MVP in 1924 and placed eighth in the league MVP vote in 1927.

In one 1927 game, he played every position except catcher and left fielder, even appearing as a relief pitcher. In 1929, Dykes had a career-high .327 batting average and was ninth in the American League in slugging, helping the Athletics win their first American League pennant in 15 years by 18 games over the New York Yankees of Babe Ruth and Lou Gehrig. He was one of six Athletics players to post batting averages above .310 during the 1929 season. Dykes capped the season by hitting .421 in the World Series against the Chicago Cubs; in Game 4, he had two hits and three runs batted in in a 10-run seventh inning as Philadelphia overcame an 8–0 deficit, and went on to win the Series in five games.

In 1930 Dykes batted .301 as the Athletics repeated as champions; in the 1930 World Series against the St. Louis Cardinals, he batted only .222, but drove in the winning run in Game 1 and had a 2-run home run in the final Game 6, a 7–1 victory.

In 1931, his batting average dropped to .273 as Philadelphia won its third straight pennant; but they lost their rematch with the Cardinals as he hit .227 in the 7-game Series.

Dykes had a disappointing year for the team in 1932 and with the onset of the Great Depression along with declining attendance, Connie Mack sought to reduce expenses by selling or trading his best players. In September 1932, he sold Dykes, Simmons and Mule Haas to the Chicago White Sox for $100,000 and a few months later sent Lefty Grove, Rube Walberg and Max Bishop to the Boston Red Sox for Bob Kline, Rabbit Warstler and $125,000. While with the White Sox, he was selected to the first two All-Star Games in 1933 and 1934.

== Career statistics ==
In 22 seasons, Dykes was a career .280 hitter with 2,256 hits, 108 home runs, 1,108 runs and 1,069 RBI in 2,282 games, along with 453 doubles and 90 triples. His 115 times being hit by a pitch ranked second in AL history behind Kid Elberfeld's 142, and his 850 strikeouts ranked fourth in major league history. He was the last active major leaguer who had played in the 1910s. His Athletics team records of 1,702 games and 6,023 at-bats were broken in the 1970s by Bert Campaneris after the franchise relocated to Oakland.

== Managerial career ==
Early in the 1934 season, he succeeded Lew Fonseca as White Sox manager. He was the team's player-manager until 1939. However, his last year as a full-time player was 1936; after that season, he only made cameo appearances in a total of 58 games. After formally retiring as a player in 1939, he continued as manager until early 1946. The White Sox finished in third place three times in his tenure. In 1936, they finished 81–70 (with two ties) while tied in percentage (.536) with the Washington Senators for third place. While they were 20 games behind the New York Yankees, it was the first time they had been a factor in a pennant race that late in any season since 1920, a year in which the team was decimated late in the season by the suspension (and eventual permanent banning from baseball) of the "Black Sox." It was also only their third winning season since 1920.

His best finish with the White Sox was the 1937 season, when they finished with an 86–68 record, which was good for another third-place finish, 16 games behind the Yankees. They finished in third place in 1941 at 77–77 (with 2 ties) and 24 games back of the Yankees. The White Sox did not place as high as 3rd place again until 1952. The worst finish for the White Sox during his tenure was the 49–88 record in his first year; his 10–20 record during his last season in 1946 was his worst in terms of percentage.

As a manager, he proved more combative and argumentative than he had been as a player, and was often fined and suspended; his 62 ejections were among the all-time top ten when he retired. After Ted Lyons replaced him as White Sox manager, Dykes managed two years in the minor leagues with the White Sox' top minor league affiliate, the Hollywood Stars. He returned to the majors in 1949 as a coach with the Athletics. On May 26, 1950–one month into the season–he was promoted to assistant manager. It was also announced Mack would retire after the 1950 season after 50 years at the helm, and Dykes would succeed him for the 1951 season. However, Dykes essentially became the A's de facto manager for the remainder of the 1950 season. He was given primary responsibility for day-to-day operations, took over as the team's main game-day operator, and split control over most baseball matters with former teammate Mickey Cochrane, who became general manager. Although Mack, who by this time was now sole owner of the club, maintained his position as team president, he was now a figurehead. Dykes remained as manager until the end of the 1953 season. In his three seasons with the Athletics, the team finished 6th, 4th, and 7th, respectively. The 1952 season had them finish 79–75 (16 games behind the Yankees). It would be the franchise's last .500 season until 1968.

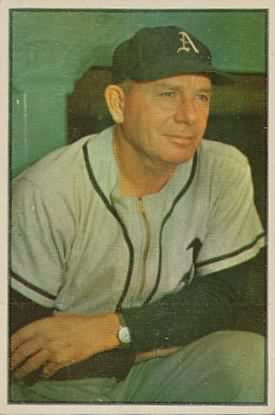
Jimmy Dykes as manager of the Athletics.

Dykes was named the Baltimore Orioles' first manager on 11 November 1953, succeeding Marty Marion after the franchise relocated from St. Louis. The appointment was made by Arthur Ehlers who had become the Orioles' general manager sixteen days prior after resigning from a similar position with the Athletics. In his only season with the team, he went 54–100 — the only 100 loss season in his managerial career. Dykes left in a team reorganization which ended with Paul Richards becoming both field and general manager in 1955. After 35 years in the American League, Dykes became a coach with the National League's Cincinnati Redlegs, leading them as interim manager for the last 41 games of the 1958 season after Birdie Tebbetts was fired. However, he came back to the AL as manager of the Detroit Tigers in 1959. The Tigers team had lost 15 of their first 17 games under Bill Norman before being fired one month into the season at which Dykes was hired. His 1959 team went 74–63 (while finishing 76–78 overall), good for 4th place and 18 games behind his old White Sox team. He managed them to a 44–52 record in 1960. At that point, Frank Lane, then general manager of the Cleveland Indians and famous for his numerous transactions, sent Joe Gordon to Detroit and brought Dykes to Cleveland in a rare trade of managers. Dykes managed the Indians from 1960–1961. His teams went 26–32 and 77–83.

In 21 seasons as a manager, Dykes compiled a 1,406–1,541 record, never winning a pennant or finishing higher than third place. After serving as a coach for the Milwaukee Braves in 1962, he returned to the Athletics, who had by then moved to Kansas City, in 1963. He retired after the 1964 season, ending 47 years at field level in baseball. Although he had a different style of managing his teams, Dykes had authority, was testy and combative; he liked to make use of his entire roster and was regarded as a motivator of players.

Dykes co-authored the 1967 memoir You Can't Steal First Base with Charles O. Dexter.

In a 1954 news story, Dykes was characterized as generally well liked by the players under him. "He's a pretty good guy," one Oriole said, "he doesn't say much but he knows how to put you straight when he has to." "Everyone feels pretty good under him," another player said. "You know he expects you to play ball but he doesn't come around and bother you about it." Dykes was known as a practical jokester and was especially fond of exploding cigars which he passed out like candy. At one time he got confused when handing one to a sportswriter he knew, which exploded in his own face in front of the intended victim; "got my hands crossed", Dykes explained.

When it came to the integration of baseball, Dykes had a mixed record. He recognized the talent of Jackie Robinson and other Black players, but was later recalled as having refused to pose with Robinson for a photograph, and was accused of calling for his pitcher to intentionally hit Minnie Miñoso, using a racial slur.

== Death ==
Dykes died in Philadelphia at age 79.

== Managerial record ==
Team	Year	Regular season					Postseason			
Team	Year	Games	Won	Lost	Win %	Finish	Won	Lost	Win %	Result
CWS	1934	137	49	88	.358	8th in AL	–	–	–	–
CWS	1935	152	74	78	.487	5th in AL	–	–	–	–
CWS	1936	151	81	70	.536	3rd in AL	–	–	–	–
CWS	1937	154	86	68	.558	3rd in AL	–	–	–	–
CWS	1938	148	65	83	.439	6th in AL	–	–	–	–
CWS	1939	154	85	69	.552	4th in AL	–	–	–	–
CWS	1940	154	82	72	.532	4th in AL	–	–	–	–
CWS	1941	154	77	77	.500	3rd in AL	–	–	–	–
CWS	1942	148	66	82	.446	6th in AL	–	–	–	–
CWS	1943	154	82	72	.532	4th in AL	–	–	–	–
CWS	1944	154	71	83	.461	7th in AL	–	–	–	–
CWS	1945	149	71	78	.477	6th in AL	–	–	–	–
CWS	1946	30	10	20	.333	resigned	–	–	–	–
CWS total		1839	899	940	.489		0	0	–	
PHA	1951	154	70	84	.455	6th in AL	–	–	–	–
PHA	1952	154	79	75	.513	4th in AL	–	–	–	–
PHA	1953	154	59	95	.383	7th in AL	–	–	–	–
PHA total		462	208	254	.450		0	0	–	
BAL	1954	154	54	100	.351	7th in AL	–	–	–	–
BAL total		154	54	100	.351		0	0	–	
CIN	1958	41	24	17	.585	4th in NL	–	–	–	–
TEAM total		41	24	17	.585		0	0	–	
DET	1959	137	74	63	.540	4th in AL	–	–	–	–
DET	1960	96	44	52	.458	traded	–	–	–	–
DET total		233	118	115	.506		0	0	–	
CLE	1960	58	26	32	.448	4th in AL	–	–	–	–
CLE	1961	160	77	83	.481	5th in AL	–	–	–	–
CLE total		218	103	115	.472		0	0	–	
Total		2947	1406	1541	.477		0	0	–	

== See also ==
- List of Major League Baseball career hits leaders
- List of Major League Baseball career doubles leaders
- List of Major League Baseball career runs scored leaders
- List of Major League Baseball career runs batted in leaders
- List of Major League Baseball managers with most career wins
- List of Major League Baseball player-managers

Sporting positions
Preceded by Buck Fausett	Hollywood Stars manager 1946–1948	Succeeded by Lou Stringer
