= Alex Kellner =

American baseball player (1924–1996)

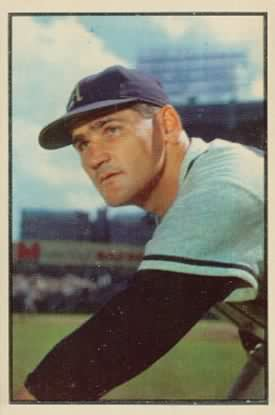
- Pitcher
- Born: August 26, 1924; Tucson, Arizona, U.S.
- Died: May 3, 1996 (aged 71); Tucson, Arizona, U.S.
- Batted: Right Threw: Left

MLB debut
- April 29, 1948, for the Philadelphia Athletics

Last MLB appearance
- June 23, 1959, for the St. Louis Cardinals

MLB statistics
- Win–loss record: 101–112
- Earned run average: 4.41
- Strikeouts: 816
- Stats at Baseball Reference

Teams
- Philadelphia / Kansas City Athletics (1948–1958); Cincinnati Redlegs (1958); St. Louis Cardinals (1959)

Career highlights and awards
- All-Star (1949)

Alexander Raymond Kellner (August 26, 1924 – May 3, 1996) was an American starting pitcher in Major League Baseball who played for the Philadelphia / Kansas City Athletics (1948–1958), Cincinnati Reds (1958) and St. Louis Cardinals (1959). Kellner batted right-handed and threw left-handed. He was born in Tucson, Arizona. His younger brother, Walt, also was a major league pitcher.

In a 12-season career, Kellner posted a 101–112 record with 816 strikeouts and a 4.17 ERA in 1,849 1/3 innings pitched. He won 20 games for the Athletics in 1949.

He had his best season in 1949, with 20 wins, 37 games started, 19 complete games, 245 innings pitched (all career-highs) en route to being a 1949 American League All-Star.

Kellner died in Tucson, Arizona, at the age of 71.
