= 1951 Major League Baseball season =

1951 MLB season
- League: American League (AL); National League (NL)
- Sport: Baseball
- Duration: Regular season: April 17 – September 30, 1951 (AL); April 16 – October 3, 1951 (NL); World Series: October 4–10, 1951
- Games: 154
- Teams: 16 (8 per league)

Regular season
- Season MVP: AL: Yogi Berra (NYY); NL: Roy Campanella (BRO)
- AL champions: New York Yankees
- AL runners-up: Cleveland Indians
- NL champions: New York Giants
- NL runners-up: Brooklyn Dodgers

World Series
- Champions: New York Yankees
- Runners-up: New York Giants
- Finals MVP: Phil Rizzuto (NYY)

MLB seasons
- ← 1950 1952 →

Locations of teams for the 1942–1953 American League seasons
American League
Locations of teams for the 1943–1952 National League seasons
National League

The 1951 major league baseball season began on April 16, 1951. The regular season ended on October 3, with the New York Giants and New York Yankees as the regular season champions of the National League and American League, respectively. The Giants defeated the Brooklyn Dodgers in a regular season best-of-three tiebreaker, for the National League title, after both teams finished their 154-game schedules with identical 96–58 records. This was the third regular season tie-breaker, and saw a reversion from the single-game tie-breaker featured in 1948 to the three-game format featured in the 1946 tie-breaker series. After splitting the first two games, the stage was set for a decisive third game, won in dramatic fashion on a walk-off home run from the bat of Giant Bobby Thomson, one of the most famous moments in the history of baseball, commemorated as the "Shot Heard 'Round the World" and "The Miracle at Coogan's Bluff". The postseason began with Game 1 of the 48th World Series on October 4 and ended with Game 6 on October 10. In the sixth iteration of this Subway Series World Series matchup, the Yankees defeated the Giants, four games to two, capturing their 14th championship in franchise history, and their third in a five-run World Series. This would be the final Subway Series matchup between the two teams, as the next World Series between the two in 1962 would see a relocated Giants franchise in San Francisco, California.

The 18th All-Star Game was held on July 10 at Briggs Stadium in Detroit, Michigan, home of the Detroit Tigers. The National League won, 8–3.

On May 1, the Chicago White Sox become the sixth team in professional baseball to break the color line when they fielded future Hall-of-Famer Minnie Miñoso.

This was Happy Chandler's last season of his 5½-tenure as Commissioner of Baseball, as he resigned on July 15, after team owner voted against renewing his contract which expired in April 1952. National League president Ford Frick would be elected as commissioner, officially taking the position September 20, just days before the end of the regular season.

== Schedule ==
The 1951 schedule consisted of 154 games for all teams in the American League and National League, each of which had eight teams. Each team was scheduled to play 22 games against the other seven teams of their respective league. This continued the format put in place since the 1904 season (except for 1919) and would be used until 1961 in the American League and 1962 in the National League.

National League Opening Day took place on April 16, with a game between the Pittsburgh Pirates and Cincinnati Reds, while American League Opening Day took place the following day, featuring all eight teams. This was the first season since 1943 that both leagues opened on different days. The final day of the scheduled regular season was on September 30, which saw all sixteen teams play, continuing the trend from 1946. Due to the Brooklyn Dodgers and New York Giants finishing with the same record of 96–58, a best-of-three tie-breaker was scheduled, to be considered an extension of the regular season, and took place between October 1 and October 3. The World Series took place between October 4 and October 10.

== Rule changes ==
The 1951 season saw the following rule changes:

- The bonus rule, which stated that any player signed to a contract greater than $4,000 (equivalent to $49,600 in 2025) had to stay on the team's 25-man roster for two years, was abolished.
- In the event of a walk, hit by pitch, or other plays with the bases loaded which forces the runners to advance bases which wins the game for the team batting in the bottom of the final inning, the runner on third must touch home base and the hitter of the current at bat must reach first base.
- Following a dead ball, play shall resume only when the pitcher, with the current ball, takes his place on the pitcher's mound.
- If a pitcher must come into a game to relieve the previous pitcher with no opportunity to warm up, he is allowed to throw as many warmup pitches on the field until the umpire feels the pitcher is properly prepared to face batters.
- If interference occurs by the catcher or fielder, and if so a batter or baserunner is awarded their next base, the catcher or fielder is charged with an error.
- Caught stealing became a trackable statistic. Official rules surrounding caught stealing would not be codified until 1963.

== Teams ==
League	Team	City	Ballpark	Capacity	Manager
American League	Boston Red Sox	Boston, Massachusetts	Fenway Park	35,200	Steve O'Neill
American League	Chicago White Sox	Chicago, Illinois	Comiskey Park	47,400	Paul Richards
American League	Cleveland Indians	Cleveland, Ohio	Cleveland Stadium	73,811	Al López
American League	Detroit Tigers	Detroit, Michigan	Briggs Stadium	58,000	Red Rolfe
American League	New York Yankees	New York, New York	Yankee Stadium	67,000	Casey Stengel
American League	Philadelphia Athletics	Philadelphia, Pennsylvania	Shibe Park	33,166	Jimmy Dykes
American League	St. Louis Browns	St. Louis, Missouri	Sportsman's Park	34,000	Zack Taylor
American League	Washington Senators	Washington, D.C.	Griffith Stadium	29,731	Bucky Walters
National League	Boston Braves	Boston, Massachusetts	Braves Field	37,106	Billy Southworth
National League	Boston Braves	Boston, Massachusetts	Braves Field	37,106	Tommy Holmes
National League	Brooklyn Dodgers	New York, New York	Ebbets Field	32,111	Chuck Dressen
National League	Chicago Cubs	Chicago, Illinois	Wrigley Field	36,755	Frankie Frisch
National League	Chicago Cubs	Chicago, Illinois	Wrigley Field	36,755	Phil Cavarretta
National League	Cincinnati Reds	Cincinnati, Ohio	Crosley Field	29,980	Luke Sewell
National League	New York Giants	New York, New York	Polo Grounds	54,500	Leo Durocher
National League	Philadelphia Phillies	Philadelphia, Pennsylvania	Shibe Park	33,166	Eddie Sawyer
National League	Pittsburgh Pirates	Pittsburgh, Pennsylvania	Forbes Field	33,730	Billy Meyer
National League	St. Louis Cardinals	St. Louis, Missouri	Sportsman's Park	34,000	Marty Marion

== Standings ==
=== American League ===
American League
Team	W	L	Pct.	GB	Home	Road
New York Yankees	98	56	.636	—	56‍–‍22	42‍–‍34
Cleveland Indians	93	61	.604	5	53‍–‍24	40‍–‍37
Boston Red Sox	87	67	.565	11	50‍–‍25	37‍–‍42
Chicago White Sox	81	73	.526	17	39‍–‍38	42‍–‍35
Detroit Tigers	73	81	.474	25	36‍–‍41	37‍–‍40
Philadelphia Athletics	70	84	.455	28	38‍–‍41	32‍–‍43
Washington Senators	62	92	.403	36	32‍–‍44	30‍–‍48
St. Louis Browns	52	102	.338	46	24‍–‍53	28‍–‍49

=== National League ===
National League
Team	W	L	Pct.	GB	Home	Road
New York Giants	98	59	.624	—	50‍–‍28	48‍–‍31
Brooklyn Dodgers	97	60	.618	1	49‍–‍29	48‍–‍31
St. Louis Cardinals	81	73	.526	15½	44‍–‍34	37‍–‍39
Boston Braves	76	78	.494	20½	42‍–‍35	34‍–‍43
Philadelphia Phillies	73	81	.474	23½	38‍–‍39	35‍–‍42
Cincinnati Reds	68	86	.442	28½	35‍–‍42	33‍–‍44
Pittsburgh Pirates	64	90	.416	32½	32‍–‍45	32‍–‍45
Chicago Cubs	62	92	.403	34½	32‍–‍45	30‍–‍47

- The New York Giants defeated the Brooklyn Dodgers in best-of-three playoff series to earn the National League pennant.

=== Tie games ===
4 tie games (1 in AL, 3 in NL), which are not factored into winning percentage or games behind (and were often replayed again) occurred throughout the season.

==== American League ====
- Chicago White Sox, 1
- Cleveland Indians, 1

==== National League ====
- Boston Braves, 1
- Brooklyn Dodgers, 1
- Chicago Cubs, 1
- Cincinnati Reds, 1
- Pittsburgh Pirates, 1
- St. Louis Cardinals, 1

== Postseason ==
The postseason began on October 1 and ended on October 10 with the New York Yankees defeating the New York Giants in the 1951 World Series in six games.

=== Bracket ===
National League playoff			World Series
			AL	NY Yankees	4
NL	NY Giants	2	NL	NY Giants	2
NL	Brooklyn	1

== Managerial changes ==
=== Off-season ===
Team	Former Manager	New Manager
Brooklyn Dodgers	Burt Shotton	Chuck Dressen
Chicago White Sox	Red Corriden	Paul Richards
Cleveland Indians	Lou Boudreau	Al López
Philadelphia Athletics	Connie Mack	Jimmy Dykes
St. Louis Cardinals	Eddie Dyer	Marty Marion

=== In-season ===
Team	Former Manager	New Manager
Boston Braves	Billy Southworth	Tommy Holmes
Chicago Cubs	Frankie Frisch	Phil Cavarretta

== League leaders ==
Any team shown in small text indicates a previous team a player was on during the season.

=== American League ===
Hitting leaders
Stat	Player	Total
AVG	Ferris Fain (PHA)	.344
OPS	Ted Williams (BOS)	1.019
HR	Gus Zernial (PHA/CWS)	33
RBI	Gus Zernial (PHA/CWS)	129
R	Dom DiMaggio (BOS)	113
H	George Kell (DET)	191
SB	Minnie Miñoso (CWS/CLE)	31

Pitching leaders
Stat	Player	Total
W	Bob Feller (CLE)	22
L	Ted Gray (DET); Alex Kellner (PHA); Bob Lemon (CLE); Billy Pierce (CWS); Duane Pillette (SLB); Dizzy Trout (DET)	14
ERA	Saul Rogovin (CWS/DET)	2.78
K	Vic Raschi (NYY)	164
IP	Early Wynn (CLE)	274.1
SV	Ellis Kinder (BOS)	16
WHIP	Eddie Lopat (NYY)	1.193

=== National League ===
Hitting leaders
Stat	Player	Total
AVG	Stan Musial (STL)	.355
OPS	Ralph Kiner (PIT)	1.079
HR	Ralph Kiner (PIT)	42
RBI	Monte Irvin (NYG)	121
R	Ralph Kiner (PIT); Stan Musial (STL)	124
H	Richie Ashburn (PHI)	221
SB	Sam Jethroe (BSN)	35

Pitching leaders
Stat	Player	Total
W	Larry Jansen (NYG); Sal Maglie (NYG)	23
L	Paul Minner (CHC); Ken Raffensberger (CIN); Willie Ramsdell (CIN)	17
ERA	Chet Nichols Jr. (BSN)	2.88
K	Don Newcombe (BRO); Warren Spahn (BSN)	164
IP	Robin Roberts (PHI)	315.0
SV	Ted Wilks (PIT/STL)	13
WHIP	Ken Raffensberger (CIN)	1.086

== Milestones ==
=== Batters ===
==== Cycles ====
- Gus Bell (PIT):
  - Bell hit for his first cycle and 17th in franchise history, on June 4 against the Philadelphia Phillies.

==== Other batting accomplishments ====
- Eddie Gaedel (SLB):
  - In his only plate appearance in the major leagues, Gaedel debuts as the shortest player in major league history at 3 feet 7 inches (109 cm), drawing a walk when he pinch-hit in game two of a doubleheader against the Detroit Tigers on August 19.

==== Other batting accomplishments ====
- Bob Nieman (SLB):
  - Became the only player in history to hit two home runs in his first two plate appearances of his Major League debut on September 14, hitting home runs in the second and third innings against the Boston Red Sox. He is the second to hit two in his first Major League game.

=== Pitchers ===
==== No-hitters ====
- Cliff Chambers (STL/PIT):
  - Chambers threw his first career no-hitter and second no-hitter in franchise history as a player on the Pittsburgh Pirates, by defeating the Boston Braves 3–0 in game two of a doubleheader on May 6. Chambers walked eight and struck out four.
- Bob Feller (CLE):
  - Feller threw his third career no-hitter and 10th no-hitter in franchise history, by defeating the Detroit Tigers 2–1 in game one of a doubleheader on July 1. Feller walked three and struck out five.
- Allie Reynolds (NYY):
  - Reynolds threw his first career no-hitter and fourth no-hitter in franchise history, by defeating the Cleveland Indians 1–0 on July 12. Reynolds walked three struck out four.
  - Reynolds threw his second career no-hitter and fifth no-hitter in franchise history, by defeating the Boston Red Sox 8–0 in game one of a doubleheader on September 28. Reynolds four and struck out nine.

== Awards and honors ==
=== Regular season ===
Baseball Writers' Association of America Awards
BBWAA Award	National League	American League
Rookie of the Year	Willie Mays (NYG)	Gil McDougald (NYY)
Most Valuable Player	Roy Campanella (BRO)	Yogi Berra (NYY)
Babe Ruth Award (World Series MVP)	—	Phil Rizzuto (NYY)

=== Other awards ===
The Sporting News Awards
Award	National League	American League
Player of the Year	Stan Musial (STL)	—
Pitcher of the Year	Preacher Roe (BRO)	Bob Feller (CLE)
Rookie of the Year	Willie Mays (NYG)	Minnie Miñoso (CWS)
Manager of the Year	Leo Durocher (NYG)	—
Executive of the Year	—	George Weiss (NYY)

=== Baseball Hall of Fame ===
- Mel Ott
- Jimmie Foxx

== Home field attendance ==
Team name	Wins	%±	Home attendance	%±	Per game
New York Yankees	98	0.0%	1,950,107	−6.3%	25,001
Cleveland Indians	93	1.1%	1,704,984	−1.3%	22,143
Chicago White Sox	81	35.0%	1,328,234	70.0%	17,029
Boston Red Sox	87	−7.4%	1,312,282	−2.4%	17,497
Brooklyn Dodgers	97	9.0%	1,282,628	8.2%	16,444
Detroit Tigers	73	−23.2%	1,132,641	−42.0%	14,710
New York Giants	98	14.0%	1,059,539	5.0%	13,584
St. Louis Cardinals	81	3.8%	1,013,429	−7.3%	12,828
Pittsburgh Pirates	64	12.3%	980,590	−15.9%	12,572
Philadelphia Phillies	73	−19.8%	937,658	−23.0%	12,177
Chicago Cubs	62	−3.1%	894,415	−23.3%	11,616
Washington Senators	62	−7.5%	695,167	−0.6%	9,147
Cincinnati Reds	68	3.0%	588,268	9.2%	7,640
Boston Braves	76	−8.4%	487,475	−48.4%	6,250
Philadelphia Athletics	70	34.6%	465,469	50.2%	5,892
St. Louis Browns	52	−10.3%	293,790	18.9%	3,815

== See also ==
- 1951 in baseball (Events, Movies, Births, Deaths)
- 1951 All-American Girls Professional Baseball League season
- 1951 Nippon Professional Baseball season
