= Night Train =

Night Train or Nightrain may refer to:

== Art ==
- Night Train (painting), a 1947 painting by Paul Delvaux
- Night Train, a 1995 mural by Blue Sky

== Film, television and radio ==
- Night Train (1959 film), a Polish film directed by Jerzy Kawalerowicz
- Night Train (1998 film), an Irish romantic thriller directed by John Lynch
- Night Train (1999 film), an American film directed by Les Bernstien
- Night Train (2007 film), a Chinese film directed by Diao Yi'nan
- Night Train (2009 film), an American thriller directed by Brian King
- Night Train Media, a German film production company
- "Night Train" (ALF), a 1987 TV episode
- "Night Train" (B.L. Stryker), a 1990 TV episode
- Night Train (radio show), a weekly radio show in Miami, Florida, U.S.
- Night Train (TV show), a weekly syndicated show that aired from Nashville television station WLAC

== Music ==
- Night Train (band), an Australian rock band
- "Night Train", a scene from the opera Einstein on the Beach, composed by Philip Glass

=== Albums ===
- Night Train (Bill Morrissey album) or the title song, 1993
- Night Train (Jason Aldean album) or the title song (see below), 2012
- Night Train (Oscar Peterson album), 1962
- Night Train (EP), by Keane, 2010
- Night Train, by Amina Figarova, 2002

=== Songs ===
- "Night Train" (Jason Aldean song), 2013
- "Night Train" (Jimmy Forrest composition), a jazz and blues standard, 1951
- "Night Train" (Visage song), 1982
- "Nightrain", by Guns N' Roses, 1987
- "Night Train", by Amos Lee from Supply and Demand, 2006
- "Night Train", by the Bouncing Souls from Anchors Aweigh, 2003
- "Nighttrain", by Public Enemy from Apocalypse 91... The Enemy Strikes Black, 1991
- "Night Train", by Rickie Lee Jones from Rickie Lee Jones, 1979
- "Night Train", by Scatman John from Take Your Time, 1999
- "Night Train", by Steve Winwood from Arc of a Diver, 1980
- "Night Train (Smooth Alligator)", by Lionel Richie from Dancing on the Ceiling, 1986

== Other uses ==
- Night Train (novel), a 1997 novel by Martin Amis
- Night Train (test), a 1963–1964 U.S. biological weapons test
- Night Train Lane (1927–2002), American football player
- Night Train, the cargo vessel involved in the Night Train seizure, a 1977 drug seizure by the U.S. Coast Guard
- Night Train, a Harley-Davidson softail motorcycle model
- Night Train, a bobsled driven by Steven Holcomb
- Night Train Express, or Night Train, a brand of low-end flavored fortified wines made by E & J Gallo Winery
- William "Night Train" Veeck, American baseball executive, son of Mike Veeck, grandson of Bill Veeck, great-grandson of William Veeck Sr.

== See also ==
- Sleeping car, a railway passenger car that can accommodate passengers in beds
