= William Veeck =

William Veeck may refer to:

- William Veeck Sr. (1876–1933), president of the Chicago Cubs Major League Baseball (MLB) franchise from 1919 to 1933
- Bill Veeck (1914–1986), son of William Veeck, Sr. and owner of several MLB teams: Philadelphia Phillies, Cleveland Indians, St. Louis Browns, and Chicago White Sox
