= Death Factory =

Death factory is a colloquial name for an extermination camp.

Death Factory may also refer to:

- Death Factory (2002 film)
- Death Factory (2014 film), aka The Butchers

== See also ==
- Death on a Factory Farm, 2009 television documentary film
