= Diora Baird =

American actress and model (born 1983)

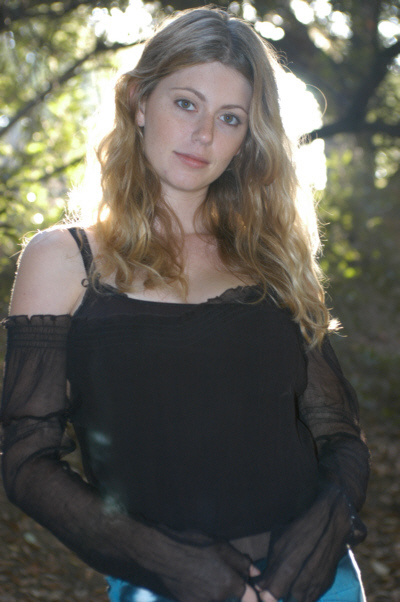
- Baird in 2003
- Born: 1983 (age 42–43); Miami, Florida, U.S.
- Occupations: Actress, model
- Years active: 2004–present
- Spouse: Jonathan Togo (divorced)
- Partner: Mav Viola (2017–)
- Children: 2

Diora Baird (born 1983) is an American actress and former model for clothing brand Guess?.

== Early life ==
Baird was born in Miami, Florida. She began acting when her mother, who was also a model, enrolled her in an acting class to help her overcome introversion. Later, she became vice president of her school's Thespian Society.

At 17, she moved to Los Angeles with the hope of pursuing an acting career. To earn money while auditioning, she worked as a salesperson at The Gap, a caterer, a waitress, a pre-school teacher, and a clown at children's parties, until breaking into the modeling industry (most notably with Guess?). Her exposure increased considerably with an appearance on the cover of, and a nude photoshoot in, the August 2005 issue of Playboy magazine. She was signed to Elite Model Management in Miami.

== Career ==
In 2004, Baird started earning acting roles on the Drew Carey Show, and in the low budget film Brain Blockers. Her breakthrough appearance in a major film was in Wedding Crashers in 2005, which she followed up with roles in Accepted and Hot Tamale. In 2006, she appeared in four films, most notably a major role in the horror film The Texas Chainsaw Massacre: The Beginning.

Baird had featured photo spreads in several magazines including Playboy, FHM, Stuff, Maxim (in which she was ranked #76 on the Maxim magazine Hot 100 of 2007 list, #64 on the Maxim magazine Hot 100 of 2008 list, #76 on the Maxim Magazine Hot 100 of 2011 list, the #17 spot on FHM's top 100 2010, and the #40 spot in 2011), Toro and Esquire (UK). She lent her voice to the Scarface video game as one of Tony Montana's possible girlfriends.

Baird has also guest starred in episodes of Big Day, Shark, The Loop, and Two and a Half Men (the 2009 episode "She'll Still Be Dead at Halftime"). She starred in the movie 30 Days of Night: Dark Days, directed by Ben Ketai, which is produced by Columbia Pictures and Ghost House Pictures. Baird stars in the FEARnet webseries Tea Party Macabre, which is part of the series "Women in Horror Month".

She starred in several videos for the Funny or Die website, including one with Garfunkel and Oates called "Go Running with Chicken" and "Sexy Dark Ages" with Robert Englund. She starred in another web video with the comedic duo called "This Party Took a Turn for the Douche". In 2010, she appeared in Night of the Demons. In February 2011, she starred in a short musical film called "Howlin' for You" for the band The Black Keys.

She plays a porn star in her 2014 film Beautiful Girl. Baird was cast in a recurring role in the Amazon Studios pilot Cocked along with costars Brian Dennehy, Jason Lee, Dreama Walker, and Sam Trammell. The show was not picked up for series.

== Personal life ==
Baird was married to actor Jonathan Togo; they have one child. In 2017, Baird revealed that she was dating comedian Mav Viola. Baird told The Advocate magazine that after years of assuming herself to be asexual, she identified as lesbian. On December 29, 2017, Baird announced that she and Viola were engaged. In May 2025, Baird gave birth to her second child.

== Filmography ==
=== Film ===
Year	Title	Role	Notes
2005	Wedding Crashers	Vivian	
2006	Hot Tamale	Tuesday Blackwell	
2006	Bachelor Party Vegas	Penelope	Direct-to-video film
2006	Fifty Pills	Tiffany	
2006	Accepted	Kiki	
2006	The Texas Chainsaw Massacre: The Beginning	Bailey	
2007	Brain Blockers	Suzi Klein	Direct-to-video film
2007	Young People Fucking	Jamie	
2008	South of Heaven	Lily	
2008	My Best Friend's Girl	Rachel	
2009	Star Trek	The Wrong Orion	Scene cut
2009	Stan Helsing	Nadine	
2009	Night of the Demons	Lily Thompson	
2010	Hot Tub Time Machine	Mrs. Steelman	
2010	Let the Game Begin	Kate	
2010	Quit	Danielle	
2010	30 Days of Night: Dark Days	Amber	Direct-to-video film
2010	Love Shack	LaCienga Torrez	
2010	Dry Run	Laurie	
2012	Transit	Arielle	
2012	Last Call	Janine	
2013	Riddle	Amber Richards	
2013	Concrete Blondes	Sammi Lovett	
2014	Beautiful Girl	Odessa	
2021	The Virtuoso	Johnnie's Girl	
2023	Night Train	Jaylynne Jackson	
2024	Spread	Xtasy	
2024	Witchy Ways	Eve	

=== Television ===
Year	Title	Role	Notes
2004	The Drew Carey Show	Valerie	Episode: "Drew Thinks Inside the Box"
2006	South Beach	Brianna	Unaired TV pilot
2006–2007	Big Day	Kristin	3 episodes
2007	Shark	Nina Lange	Episode: "Fall from Grace"
2007	The Loop	Cara	Guest role; 2 episodes
2009	Two and a Half Men	Wanda	Episode: "She'll Still Be Dead at Halftime"
2009	Robot Chicken	Fantasia / Spanish Woman / Woman / Lady	Voice role; 2 episodes
2009	Gary Unmarried	Redhead	Episode: "Gary Shoots Fish in a Barrel"
2009	Accidentally on Purpose	Andrea	Episode: "The Love Guru"
2010	Law & Order: Special Victims Unit	Lainie McCallum	Episode: "Witness"
2011	Psych	Nicole	Episode: "The Tao of Gus"
2012	Bent	Natalie	Episode: "Smitten"
2012–2013	Shameless	Meg	4 episodes
2014	Franklin & Bash	Cindy Maloney	Episode: "Dance the Night Away"
2014	Newsreaders	Ashley / Jennifer	Episode: "Strip Club Expose; Long Lost Twins"
2015	Cocked	Aubrey	Television film
2015	Casual	April	Episode: "Animals"
2016	Telenovela	Maria Wilson	Episode: "Caught in the Act"
2016	Angel from Hell	Brandi	3 episodes
2018	My Daughter Vanished	Melanie	Television film; also known as Hidden Family Secrets
2018–2025	Cobra Kai	Shannon Keene	Guest role
2019	The Missing Sister	Collette	Television film; also known as My Sister's Deadly Secret
2020	Her Secret Family Killer	April	Television film
2020	Psycho Sister-In-Law	Callie Hayes	Television film
2022	Bound by Blackmail	Diana	Television film
2023	You're Not Supposed to Be Here	Kennedy	Television film

=== Web ===
- Tea Party Macabre (2010), as herself; 5 episodes

=== Music videos ===
- "Howlin' for You" (2011), by The Black Keys
- "This Party Took a Turn for the Douche" (2011), by Garfunkel and Oates
- "Out of Goodbyes" (2011), by Maroon 5 featuring Lady Antebellum

=== Video game ===
- Scarface: The World is Yours (2006), as Femme Fatale (voice role)
