= Edwin Craig =

American actor (born 1937)

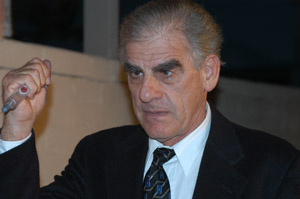
- Edwin Craig in Brain Blockers
- Born: July 10, 1937 (age 89)

Edwin Craig (born July 10, 1937) is an American actor known for his roles in Who Framed Roger Rabbit, Hellbound: Hellraiser II and Batman. He is the son of an Italian American actress, Adele Craig.

== Filmography ==
Year	Title	Role	Notes
1973	The Don Is Dead	Fargo Soldier	Uncredited
1978	Rabbit Test	Man In Crowd	
1982	Comeback	"Freak"	
1987	Three Kinds of Heat	Scibillia	
1988	Who Framed Roger Rabbit	Arthritic Cowboy	
1988	Hellbound: Hellraiser II	Wheelchair Patient	
1989	Batman	Antoine Rotelli	
1992	The Runner	George Callington	
1997	Confessions of a Lap Dancer	Abe	
1997	Operation Dalmatian: The Big Adventure	Medicine Man	
1998	Denial	Audience Member	
1999	Not Quite an Angel	Hampton	
2002	Trance		
2003	Aquanoids	Frank Walsh	
2004	Brain Blockers	Dr. Douglas Newton	
2005	Alien Abduction	The Director	
2007	Lake Dead	Willard Lake / Grandpa	
