= Crystal Day =

American singer

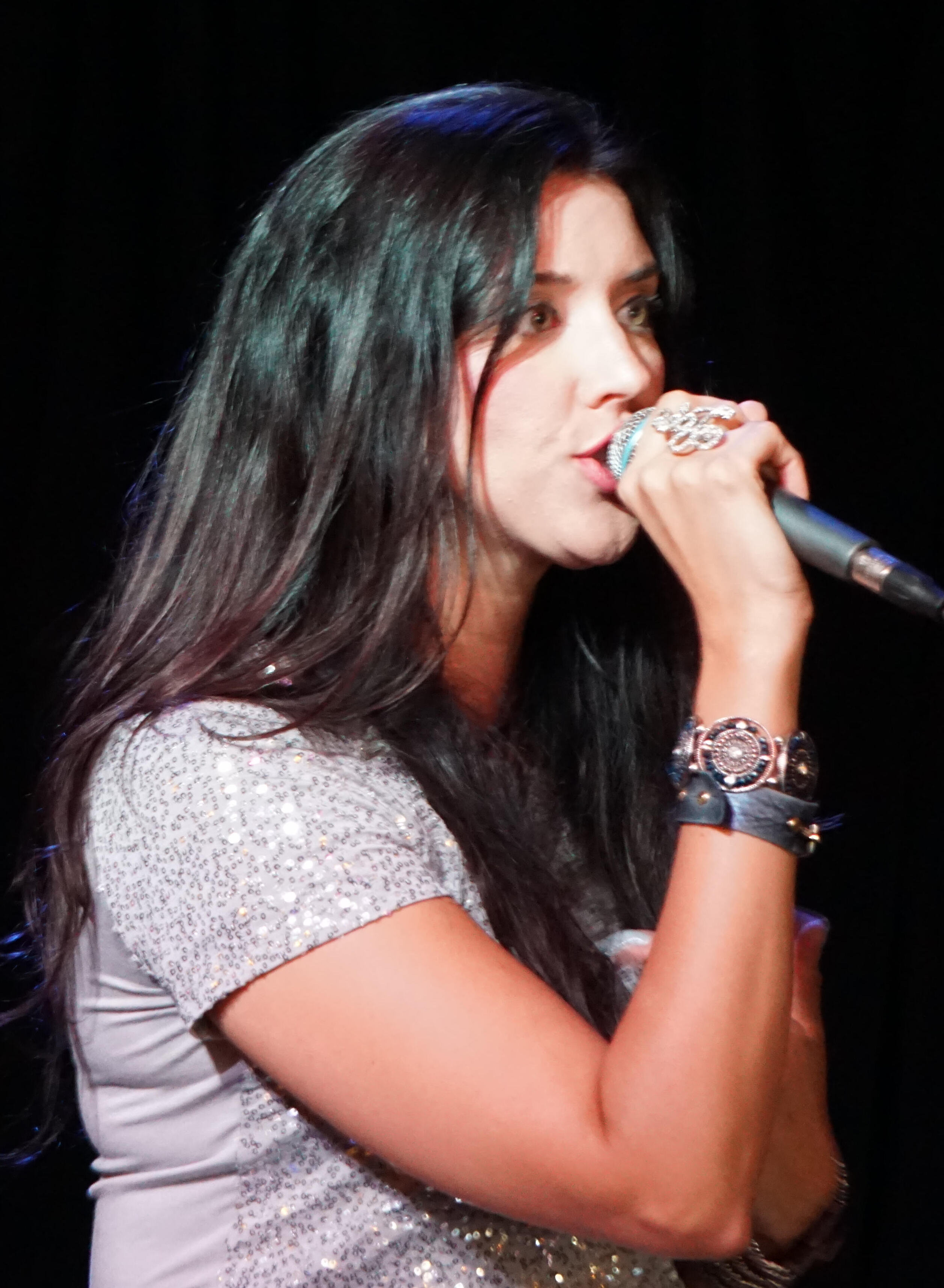
- Day performing at the Country in Nashville, TN
- Occupation: Singer
- Website: crystalday.net

Crystal Day is an American singer.

== Early life ==
Day started in the theater at the age of six. Her largest adolescent role came when she was eight when she starred as Marta Von Trapp (second youngest child) in the popular musical, The Sound of Music. The production was performed eight times a week. In addition, she was a part of the theater production of Tobacco Road, performing alongside Lin Shaye. At 13 years old, Crystal Day entered a studio in Nashville, Tennessee and started recording songs for her first CD "Anything Can Happen"

She teamed up with Grammy-winning producer Tom Weir at Studio City Sound (Kelly Clarkson, Lee Ann Womack, Willie Nelson, LMFAO). During that time, she also began taking classes at the Songwriting School of Los Angeles. After honing her songwriting craft in L.A., Day went to Music City where she began co-writing with professional songwriters, joining forces with Nashville producer Biff Watson (Blake Shelton, Keith Urban, Tim McGraw, Lady Antebellum, Charles Kelley, Martina McBride, etc.) and developing material for her upcoming EP Brave. She began taking acting lessons and had soon landed roles in several independent films such as Brain Blockers and The Passing. She also wrote and performed songs that were featured on the sound tracks of those two films.

She became a fixture in the Los Angeles theater scene, performing in several productions before moving to Nashville to focus on her music career.

== Music career ==
Day opened for multi-platinum recording artist Martina McBride. The South Boston, Virginia native traveled to Los Angeles to perform at Universal Studios for the World Championships of Performing Arts where she placed gold. In addition, she became the youngest American to be invited to perform in the Amsterdam Music Festival. Here she had the opportunity to perform in front of 30,000 people daily. Her success in Amsterdam led her to begin touring the Eastern Hemisphere. She is also an author.
