= Three Kinds of Heat =

1987 film directed by Leslie Stevens

- U.S. theatrical poster
- Directed by: Leslie Stevens
- Written by: Leslie Stevens
- Produced by: Michael J. Kagan
- Starring: Robert Ginty; Victoria Barrett; Shakti Chen; Sylvester McCoy
- Cinematography: Terry Cole
- Edited by: Robert C. Dearberg
- Music by: Michael Bishop; Scott Page
- Production companies: Cannon Films (as Cannon International)
- Distributed by: Cannon Releasing Corporation (U.S.)
- Release date: June 5, 1987 (U.S.)
- Running time: 88 minutes
- Countries: United States; United Kingdom
- Language: English
- Budget: $4 million

Three Kinds of Heat is a 1987 British–American crime comedy film written and directed by Leslie Stevens and starring Robert Ginty, Victoria Barrett, Shakti Chen and Sylvester McCoy. The story concerns two rival policewomen from New York (Barrett) and Hong Kong (Chen), who are enlisted by a State Department agent (Ginty) to investigate a mysterious criminal's international operations on behalf of Interpol.

== Plot ==
A gunfight erupts inside New York's John F. Kennedy International Airport between two factions of an Asian crime syndicate, the Black Lion. Airport cop Terry O'Shea intervenes, but she butts heads with Major Shan, a Hong Kong police officer who was tailing the gangsters, over matters of jurisdiction. Shan is after Harry Pimm, a top Black Lion member, who has managed to flee the terminal. The latter holds information about the group's drug trafficking activities, which are conducted under the guise of a fireworks import business.

U.S. State Department agent Elliott Cromwell, who witnessed the shooting, asks for reinforcements from Interpol. When the agency finds itself short on personnel, he requires permission to enlist both policewomen in his task force to dismantle the Black Lion. The three contrasting personalities must set aside their differences to track down the mysterious Pimm. A hint of romance develops between Cromwell and O'Shea as their investigation leads them to London, England, and back for a last-reel twist and an explosive conclusion.

== Cast ==
- Robert Ginty as Elliot Cromwell
- Victoria Barrett as Terry O'Shea
- Shakti Chen as Major Shan
- Sylvester McCoy as Harry Pimm
- Barry Foster as Norris
- Mary Tamm as Piou
- Paul Gee as Eddie Wing
- Malcolm Connell as Jingmao
- Trevor Martin as Haggard
- Jeannie Brown as Angelica
- Keith Edwards as Kaufman
- Jack Hedley as Kirkland
- Bridget Khan as Adrianna
- Leslie Clark as Duclos
- Edwin Craig as Scibillia
- Patrick Durkin as Trainer
- Samantha Fox as Charleen
- Robert Grange as Peterson
- Linda May Harris as Coco
- Jerry Harte as Haig
- Oscar James as Unle Joe
- Arnold Lee as Cho
- Reginald Marsh as Sir Hugh
- Michael Mellinger as Reggio
- Paul Ridley as Collins
- Natasha Williams as Fran

== Production ==
=== Development ===
The project marked the return of filmmaker Leslie Stevens to the big screen after working in television for the better part of two decades. During pre-production, the film was known as Fireworks or Operation Fireworks. Although director Leslie Stevens was the sole credited writer in the finished picture, some pre-production items named British playwright Tudor Gates as co-author. The film was intended as a vehicle for the two leading ladies, Shakti Chen and Victoria Barrett, who respectively were Stevens' wife and producer Menahem Golan's mistress. It was made by Golan's Cannon Films via its British subsidiary London–Cannon Films.

=== Filming ===
Principal photography began on July 21, 1986. The schedule called for three weeks of location work in London, England, visiting such landmarks as the Smithfield Meat Market. Another three week of interiors were booked at Elstree Studios, in nearby Borehamwood. It was the first movie made there after their acquisition by The Cannon Group. Internally, it was viewed as a trial run to familiarize Cannon's staff with the facility before tackling Superman IV, on which rested many of the company's hopes. Trade sources mentioned that an additional week of filming was due to take place on location in Harlem, New York City, where part of the story is set. However, several reviewers have noted that New York scenes present in the finished picture appear to have been shot in the U.K.

== Release ==
=== Pre-release ===
Three Kinds of Heat was screened for industry professionals at the Cannes Film Market on May 17, 1987. One publication mentions that May 8, 1987, was originally envisioned as the film's U.S. opening date.

=== Theatrical ===
The film opened in Florida on June 5, 1987, via the producer's distribution arm, Cannon Releasing Corporation. It expanded to other domestic markets throughout the summer and fall.

=== Home media ===
In the U.S., the film arrived on video on December 16, 1987, through Warner Home Video, delayed from December 9. In the U.K., the film was released direct-to-tape on August 8, 1988, also by Warner Home Video, on VHS and Betamax.

== Reception ==
Three Kinds of Heat has received negative reviews from critics. Michael H. Price of the Fort Worth Star-Telegram called the film "a sorry disappointment from writer-director Leslie Stevens". he added that "[t]he performances are sleepwalks across the board; the action sequences are limp". Joe Kane, the New York Daily News' resident genre columnist, found that "the embattled Cannon Group fires another blank with Three Kinds of Heat", calling it "slow paced" and "listless", although he enjoyed Shakti's performance. Carl Hoover of the Waco Tribune-Herald called it a "routine Golan-Globus shoot'em up", finding that "while it looks intriguing on paper, in actuality it proves just another crime film".

Terry Lawson of the Dayton Daily News opined that "everything about it is inept and/or lackluster, beginning with the needlessly complicated script, and moving right through sloppy editing, sub-par cinematography and performances that suggest the actors could not care less about what they are doing." Mike Weatherford of the Kansas City Star concurred, writing that "the latest grist from the Cannon Film Group is a lukewarm action yarn that is as confusing and unfocused as its cryptic title." Scott Cain of the Atlanta Constitution noted that Ginty "adopts a debonair manner" which "doesn't fit his unsophisticated image", while the two ladies' bickering was "only mildly amusing" and did not alleviate the fact that "[f]or most of the movie, there is no action of the kind that Ginty's audience will expect."

British reception was along the same lines. Rodger Clark of the Manchester Evening News called Three Kinds of Heat a "piece of nonsense" that was even less fun to watch than replays of England's dismal showings at the 1988 European Football Championship, and reserved his only praise for the "stunning" Shakti. Jonathan Wilson of the Cambridge Evening News dismissed it as "ill thought-out, poorly scripted tosh" and added that "all the stars are less than convincing", criticizing the decision to keep Shakti in her flashy uniform at all times during a secret mission.
