= Disco Demolition Night =

1979 Chicago baseball promotion and riot

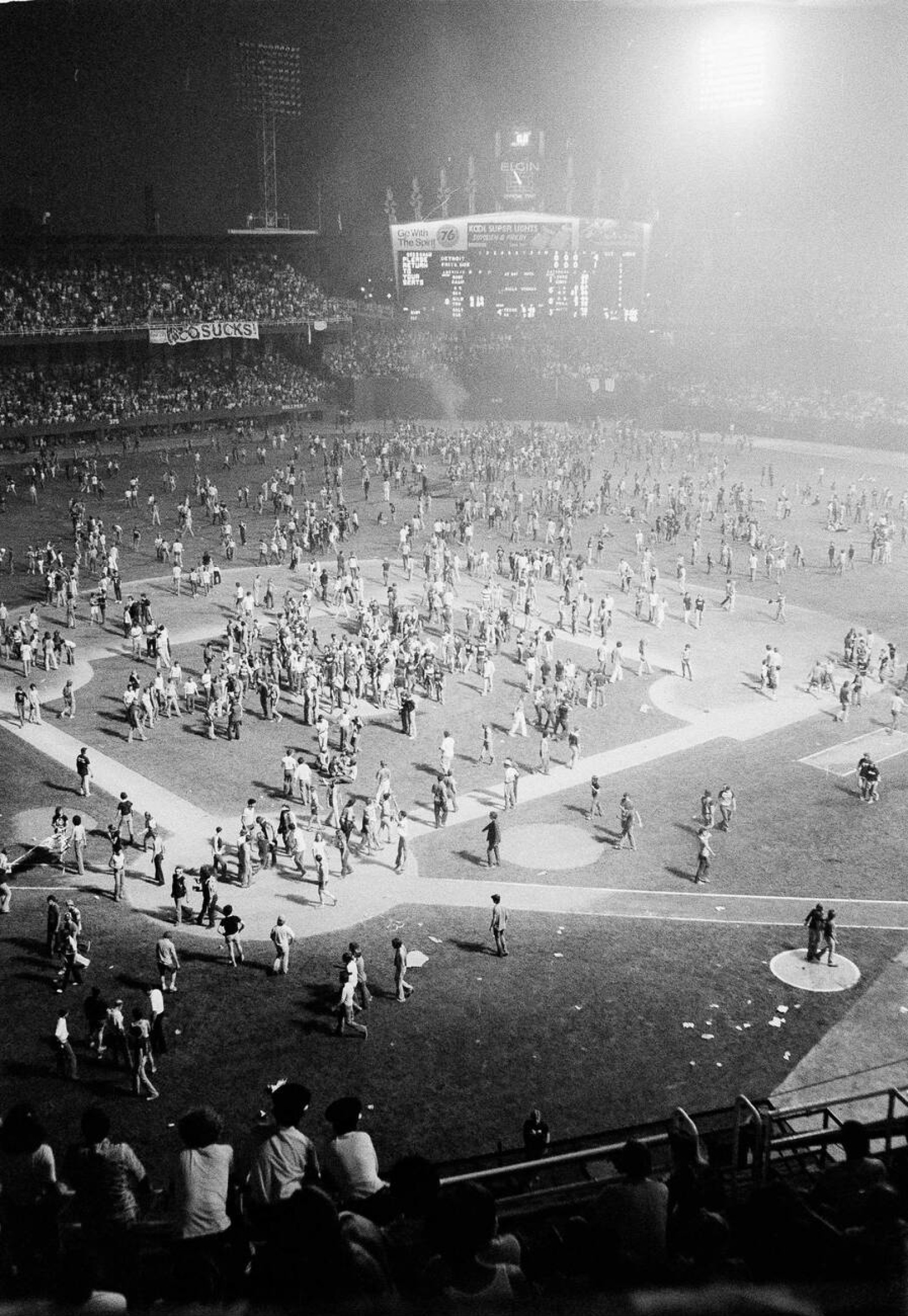
- Fans having stormed the field at Comiskey Park after the explosion of disco records
- Date: July 12, 1979
- Time: 6:00 pm CDT and following
- Location: Comiskey Park, Chicago, Illinois, U.S.; 41°49′56″N 87°38′00″W
- Cause: Promotional event: 98¢ admission with a disco record; discounted admission for teenagers
- Participants: Steve Dahl, Mike Veeck, and several thousand attendees
- Outcome: Game 2 of Tigers/White Sox doubleheader forfeited to Detroit
- Deaths: None
- Injuries: 0–30
- Property damage: Damage to the playing field
- Suspects: Approximately 39
- Charges: Disorderly conduct
Disco Demolition Night
	1	2	3	4	5	6	7	8	9	R	H	E
Detroit Tigers	1	1	1	0	0	1	0	0	0	4	9	0
Chicago White Sox	0	1	0	0	0	0	0	0	0	1	5	2
- Date: July 12, 1979 (first game of a doubleheader)
- Venue: Comiskey Park
- City: Chicago, Illinois
- Umpires: HP: Dave Phillips (crew chief); 1B: Dan Morrison; 2B: Dallas Parks; 3B: Durwood Merrill
- Attendance: 47,495
- Television: WDIV (Tigers' broadcast); WSNS-TV (White Sox' broadcast)
- TV announcers: WDIV: George Kell, Al Kaline and Mike Barry; WSNS-TV: Lorn Brown, Harry Caray and Jimmy Piersall
- Radio: WJR (Tigers' broadcast); WMAQ (White Sox' broadcast)
- Radio announcers: WJR: Ernie Harwell and Paul Carey; WMAQ: Brown, Caray and Piersall

Disco Demolition Night was a Major League Baseball (MLB) promotion on Thursday, July 12, 1979, at Comiskey Park in Chicago, Illinois, that ended in a riot. At the climax of the event, a crate filled with disco records was blown up on the field between games of the twi-night doubleheader between the Chicago White Sox and the Detroit Tigers. Many had come to see the explosion rather than the games and rushed onto the field after the detonation. The playing field was so damaged by the explosion and by the rioters that the White Sox were required to forfeit the second game to the Tigers.

In the late 1970s, dance-oriented disco was the most popular music genre in the United States, particularly after being featured in hit films such as Saturday Night Fever (1977). However, disco sparked a major backlash from rock music fans—an opposition prominent enough that the White Sox, seeking to fill seats at Comiskey Park during a lackluster season, engaged Chicago shock jock and anti-disco campaigner Steve Dahl for the promotion at the July 12 doubleheader. Dahl's sponsoring radio station was WLUP (97.9 FM, now WCKL), so admission was discounted to 98 cents for attendees who turned in a disco record; between games, Dahl was to destroy the collected vinyl in an explosion.

White Sox officials had hoped for a crowd of 20,000, about 5,000 more than usual. Instead, at least 50,000—including tens of thousands of Dahl's listeners—packed the stadium, and thousands more continued to sneak in after capacity was reached and gates were closed. Many of the records were not collected by staff and were thrown like flying discs from the stands. After Dahl blew up the collected records, thousands of fans stormed the field and remained there until dispersed by riot police.

The second game was initially postponed, but was forfeited to the Tigers the next day by order of American League president Lee MacPhail. Disco Demolition Night preceded, and may have helped precipitate, the decline of disco in late 1979; some scholars and disco artists have debated whether the event was expressive of racism and homophobia. Disco Demolition Night remains well known as one of the most extreme promotions in MLB history.

== Background ==
=== Disco ===
Disco evolved in the late 1960s in inner-city New York City nightclubs, where disc jockeys played imported dance music. Although its roots were in African-American and Latin American music, and in gay culture, it eventually became mainstream; even white artists better known for more sedate music had disco-influenced hits, such as Barry Manilow's "Copacabana." The release of the hit movie Saturday Night Fever in 1977, whose star (John Travolta) and musical performers (the Bee Gees) presented a heterosexual image, helped popularize disco in the United States. As Al Coury, president of RSO Records (which had released the bestselling soundtrack album for the film) put it, Saturday Night Fever "took disco out of the closet."

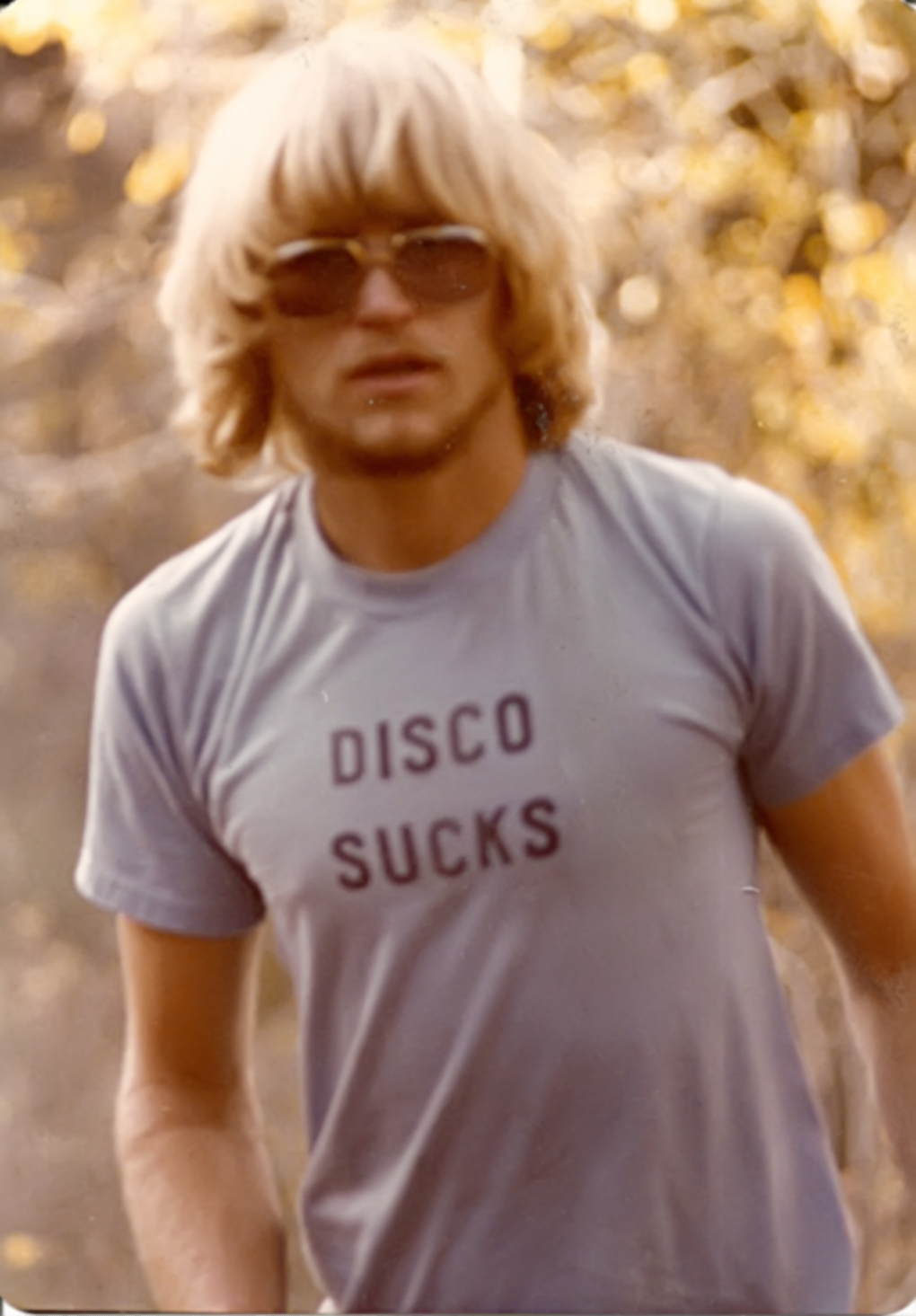
A man wearing a "disco sucks" T-shirt in 1977. Backlash against disco music had grown prominent by the end of that year.

Some felt disco was too mechanical; Time magazine deemed it a "diabolical thump-and-shriek." Others hated it for the associated scene, with its emphasis on personal appearance and style of dress. The media emphasized its roots in gay culture. According to historian Gillian Frank, "by the time of the Disco Demolition in Comiskey Park, the media ... cultivated a widespread perception that disco was taking over." Performers who cultivated a gay image, such as Village People (described by Rolling Stone as "the face of disco"), did nothing to efface these perceptions, and fears that rock music would die out increased after disco albums dominated the 21st Grammy Awards in February 1979.

In 1978, WKTU (now WINS-FM) in New York, a low-rated rock station, switched to disco and became the most popular station in the country; this led other stations to try to emulate its success. In Chicago, 24-year-old Steve Dahl was working as a disc jockey for ABC-owned radio station WDAI (now WLS-FM) when he was fired on Christmas Eve 1978 as part of the station's switch from rock to disco. He was hired by rival album-rock station WLUP. Sensing an incipient anti-disco backlash and playing off the publicity surrounding his firing (he frequently mocked WDAI's "Disco DAI" slogan on the air as "Disco DIE"), Dahl created a mock organization, the "Insane Coho Lips", an anti-disco army consisting of his listeners. According to Andy Behrens of ESPN, Dahl and his broadcast partner Garry Meier "organized the Cohos around a simple and surprisingly powerful idea: Disco Sucks."

According to Dahl, in 1979, the Cohos were locked in a war "dedicated to the eradication of the dreaded musical disease known as DISCO." In the weeks leading up to Disco Demolition Night, Dahl promoted a number of anti-disco public events, several of which became unruly. When a discotheque in Lynwood, Illinois, switched from disco to rock in June, Dahl arrived, as did several thousand Cohos, and the police were called. Later that month, Dahl and several thousand Cohos occupied a teen disco in the Chicago suburbs. At the end of June, Dahl urged his listeners to throw marshmallows at a WDAI promotional van at a shopping mall where a teen disco had been built. The Cohos chased the van and driver and cornered them in a park, though the situation ended without violence. On July 1, a near-riot occurred in Hanover Park, Illinois, when hundreds of Cohos could not enter a sold-out promotional event, and fights broke out. Some 50 police officers were needed to control the situation. When disco star Van McCoy died suddenly on July 6, Dahl marked the occasion by destroying one of his records, "The Hustle", on the air.

Do ya think I'm disco
Cuz I spend so much time
Blow drying out my hair?
Do ya think I'm disco
Cuz I know the dance steps
Learned them all at Fred Astaire?

— Steve Dahl, "Do Ya Think I'm Disco?" (1979)

Dahl and Meier regularly mocked disco records on the radio. Dahl also recorded his own song, "Do Ya Think I'm Disco?", a parody of Rod Stewart's disco-oriented hit "Da Ya Think I'm Sexy?." The song characterized discotheques as populated by effeminate men and frigid women. The protagonist, named Tony after Travolta's character in Saturday Night Fever, is unable to attract a woman until he abandons the disco scene, selling his white three-piece suit at a garage sale and melting down his gold chains for a Led Zeppelin belt buckle.

A number of anti-disco incidents took place elsewhere in the first half of 1979, showing that "the Disco Demolition was not an isolated incident or an aberration." In Seattle, hundreds of rock fans attacked a mobile dance floor, while in Portland, Oregon, a disc jockey destroyed a stack of disco records with a chainsaw as thousands cheered. In New York, a rock DJ played Donna Summer's disco hit "Hot Stuff" and received protests from listeners.

=== Baseball ===
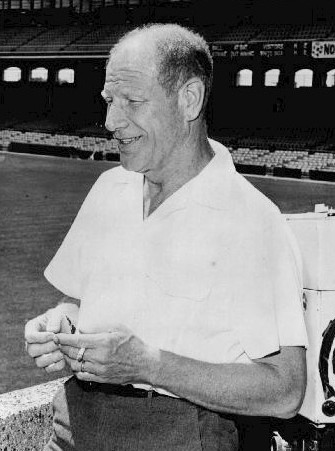
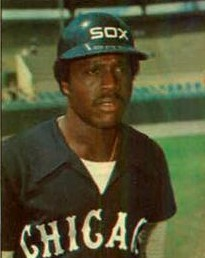
Bill Veeck (left) completely redefined the Chicago White Sox fan experience in the late 1970s through a relentless barrage of outlandish promotions and radical uniform changes (right).

Since the 1940s, Chicago White Sox owner Bill Veeck had been noted for using promotions to increase fan interest; he stated "you can draw more people with a losing team plus bread and circuses than with a losing team and a long, still silence." His son, Mike Veeck, was the promotions director for the White Sox in 1979. Mike wrote in a letter to a fan before the season that team management intended to make sure that whether the White Sox won or lost, the fans would have fun.

Early in the 1979 season, a game between the White Sox and the visiting Tigers scheduled for Wednesday, May 2, was rained out. Officials rescheduled it as part of a twi-night doubleheader on Thursday, July 12. Already scheduled for the evening of July 12 was a promotion aimed at teenagers, who could purchase tickets at half the regular price.

The White Sox had a "Disco Night" at Comiskey Park in 1977. At a WLUP Promotion Meeting, Schwartz mentioned that the White Sox were looking to do a promotion with the station. The station had already done two successful events at local Chicago-area nightclubs with overflow crowds. When Schwartz mentioned the White Sox were looking for a promotion, Promotion Director Dave Logan suggested it might be time to take Steve Dahl's event to a larger venue. The matter had also been brought up early in the 1979 season when Schwartz told Mike Veeck of Dahl and his plans to blow up a crate of disco records while live on the air from a shopping mall. Dahl was asked if he would be interested in blowing up records at Comiskey Park on July 12. Since the radio frequency of WLUP was 97.9, the promotion for July 12, "Disco Demolition Night" (in addition to the offer for teenagers) was that anyone who brought a disco record to the ballpark would be admitted for 98 cents. Dahl was to blow up the collected records between games of the doubleheader.

== Event ==
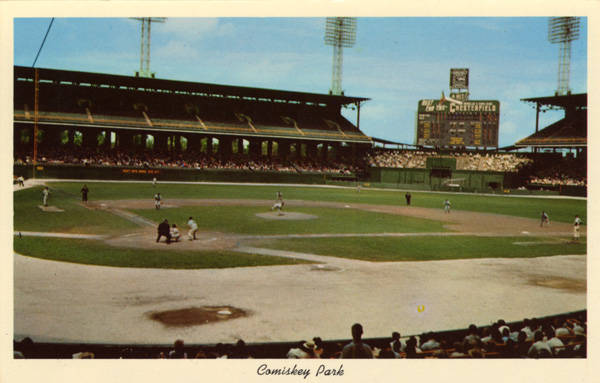
Comiskey Park served as the home stadium of the Chicago White Sox from 1910 until the end of the 1990 season

In the weeks before the event, Dahl invited his listeners to bring records they wanted to see destroyed to Comiskey Park. He feared that the promotion would fail to draw people to the ballpark and that he would be humiliated. The previous night's attendance had been 15,520, and Comiskey Park had a capacity of 44,492. The White Sox were not having a good year, and were 40–46 going into the July 12 doubleheader. The White Sox and WLUP hoped for a crowd of 20,000, and Mike Veeck hired enough security for 35,000.

Owner Bill Veeck was concerned the promotion might become a disaster and checked himself out of the hospital, where he had been undergoing tests. His fears were substantiated when he saw the people walking towards the ballpark that afternoon; many carried signs that described disco in profane terms.

The doubleheader sold out, leaving at least 20,000 people outside the ballpark. Some leapt turnstiles, climbed fences, and entered through open windows. The attendance was officially reported as 47,795, though Bill Veeck estimated that there were anywhere from 50,000 to 55,000 in the park—easily the largest crowd of his second stint as White Sox owner. The Chicago Police Department closed off-ramps from the Dan Ryan Expressway near the stadium. Attendees were supposed to deposit their records into a large box, some 4 by 6 by 5 feet (1.2 by 1.8 by 1.5 m) tall; once the box was overflowing, many people brought their discs to their seats.

The first game was to begin at 6:00 pm CDT, with the second game to follow. Lorelei, a model who did public appearances for WLUP and who was popular in Chicago that summer for her sexually provocative poses in the station's advertisements, threw out the first pitch. As the first game began, Mike Veeck received word that thousands of people were trying to get into the park without tickets and sent his security personnel to the stadium gates to stop them. This left the field unattended, and fans began throwing the uncollected disco LPs and singles from the stands. Tigers designated hitter Rusty Staub remembered that the records would slice through the air, and land sticking out of the ground. He urged teammates to wear batting helmets when playing their positions, "It wasn't just one, it was many. Oh, God almighty, I've never seen anything so dangerous in my life." Attendees also threw firecrackers, empty liquor bottles, and lighters onto the field. The game was stopped several times because of the rain of foreign objects.

Dozens of hand-painted banners with such slogans as "Disco sucks" were hung from the ballpark's seating decks. White Sox broadcaster Harry Caray saw groups of music fans wandering the stands. Others sat intently in their seats, awaiting the explosion. Mike Veeck recalled an odor of marijuana in the grandstand and said of the attendees, "This is the Woodstock they never had." The odor permeated the press box, which Caray and his broadcast partner, Jimmy Piersall, commented on over the air. The crowds outside the stadium also threw records, or gathered them and burned them in bonfires.

Detroit won the game, 4–1.

== Explosion ==
At 8:40, Dahl, dressed in army fatigues and a helmet, emerged onto the playing surface together with Meier and Lorelei. They circled the field in a Jeep, showered (according to Dahl, lovingly) by his troops with firecrackers and beer, then proceeded to center field where the box containing the records awaited, rigged with explosives. Dahl and Meier warmed up the crowd, leading attendees in a chant of "disco sucks." Lorelei recalled that the view from center field was surreal. On the mound, White Sox pitcher Ken Kravec, scheduled to start the second game, began to warm up. Other White Sox, in the dugout and wearing batting helmets, looked out upon the scene. Fans who felt events were getting out of control and who wished to leave the ballpark had difficulty doing so; in an effort to deny the intruders entry, security had padlocked all but one gate.

Dahl told the crowd:

This is now officially the world's largest anti-disco rally! Now listen—we took all the disco records you brought tonight, we got 'em in a giant box, and we're gonna blow 'em up reeeeeeal goooood.

Dahl set off the explosives, destroying the records and tearing a large hole in the outfield grass. With most of the security personnel still watching the gates per Mike Veeck's orders, there was almost no one guarding the playing surface. Soon, the first of 5,000 to 7,000 attendees rushed onto the field, causing Kravec to flee the mound and join his teammates in a barricaded clubhouse. Some climbed the foul poles, while others set records on fire or ripped up the grass. The batting cage was destroyed, and the bases were pulled up and stolen. Among those taking to the field was 21-year-old aspiring actor Michael Clarke Duncan; during the melee, Duncan slid into third base, had a silver belt buckle stolen, and went home with a bat from the dugout. As Bill Veeck stood with a microphone near where home plate had been, begging people to return to the stands, a bonfire raged in center field.

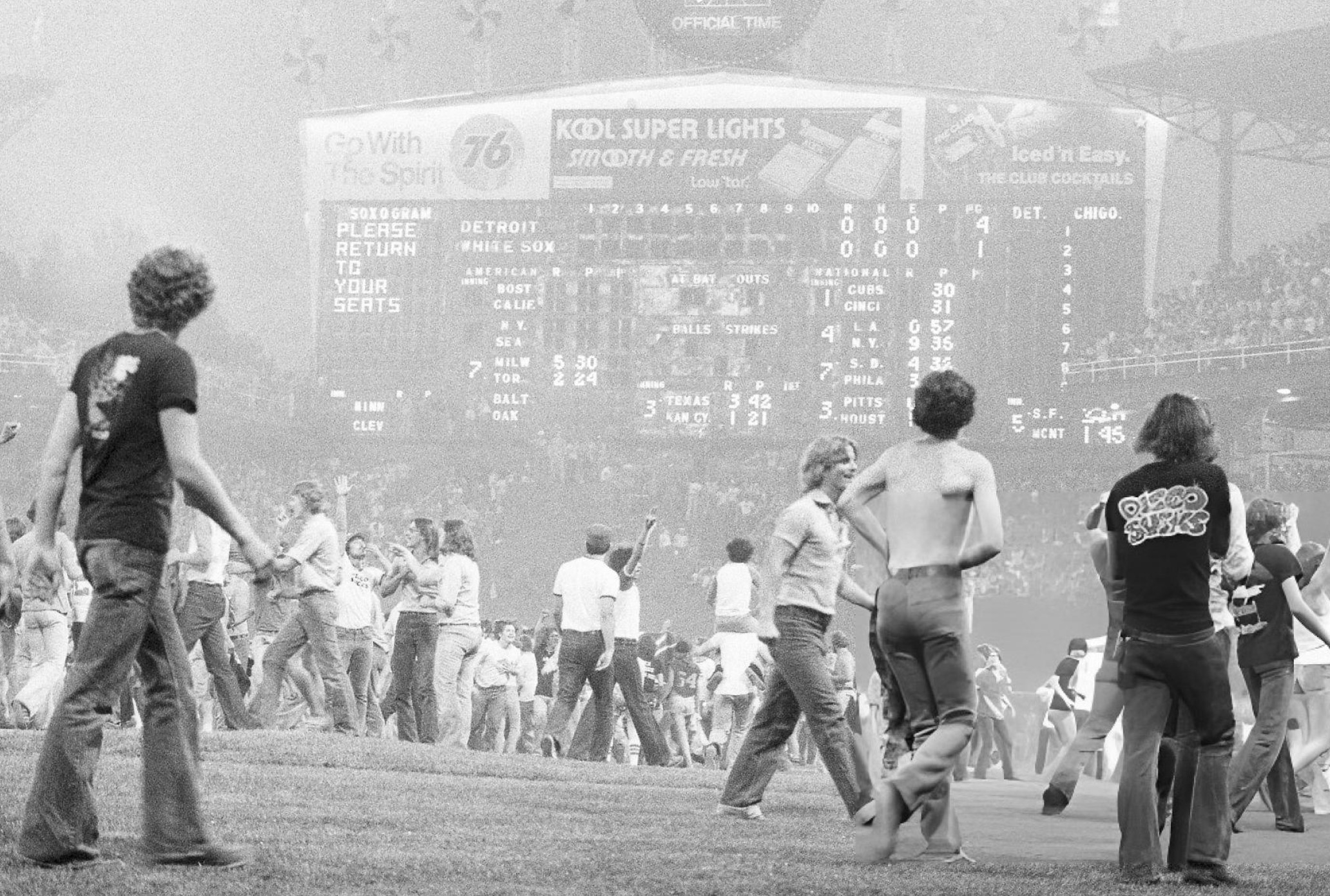
Thousands of spectators pour onto the playing field here at Comiskey Park during an "Anti-Disco" demonstration

Years later, Lorelei remembered that she had been waving to the crowd when she was grabbed by two of the bodyguards who had accompanied the Jeep, who placed her back in the vehicle. The party was unable to return to home plate because of the rowdy fans, so the Jeep was driven out of the stadium and through the surrounding streets, to the delight of the many Cohos outside the stadium, who recognized the occupants. They were driven to the front of the stadium, ushered back inside, and taken up to the press room where they had spent most of the first game.

Caray unsuccessfully attempted to restore order via the public address system. The scoreboard, flashing "PLEASE RETURN TO YOUR SEATS", was ignored, as was the playing of "Take Me Out to the Ball Game." Some attendees danced in circles around the burning vinyl shards. Dahl offered his help to get the rowdy fans to leave, but it was declined.

At 9:08 pm, Chicago police in riot gear arrived, to the applause of the baseball fans remaining in the stands. Those on the field hastily dispersed upon seeing the police. Thirty-nine people were arrested for disorderly conduct; estimates of injuries to those at the event range from none to over thirty.

Veeck wanted the teams to play the second game once order was restored. However, the field was so badly torn up that umpiring crew chief Dave Phillips felt that it was still not playable, even after White Sox groundskeepers spent an hour clearing away debris. Tigers manager Sparky Anderson refused to allow his players to take the field in any event due to safety concerns. Phillips called American League president Lee MacPhail, who postponed the second game to Sunday after hearing a report on conditions. Anderson, however, demanded that the game be forfeited to the Tigers. He argued that under baseball's rules, a game can only be postponed due to an act of God, and that, as the home team, the White Sox were responsible for field conditions. The next day, MacPhail forfeited the second game to the Tigers 9–0. In a ruling that largely upheld Anderson's arguments, MacPhail stated that the White Sox had failed to provide acceptable playing conditions.

== Aftermath ==
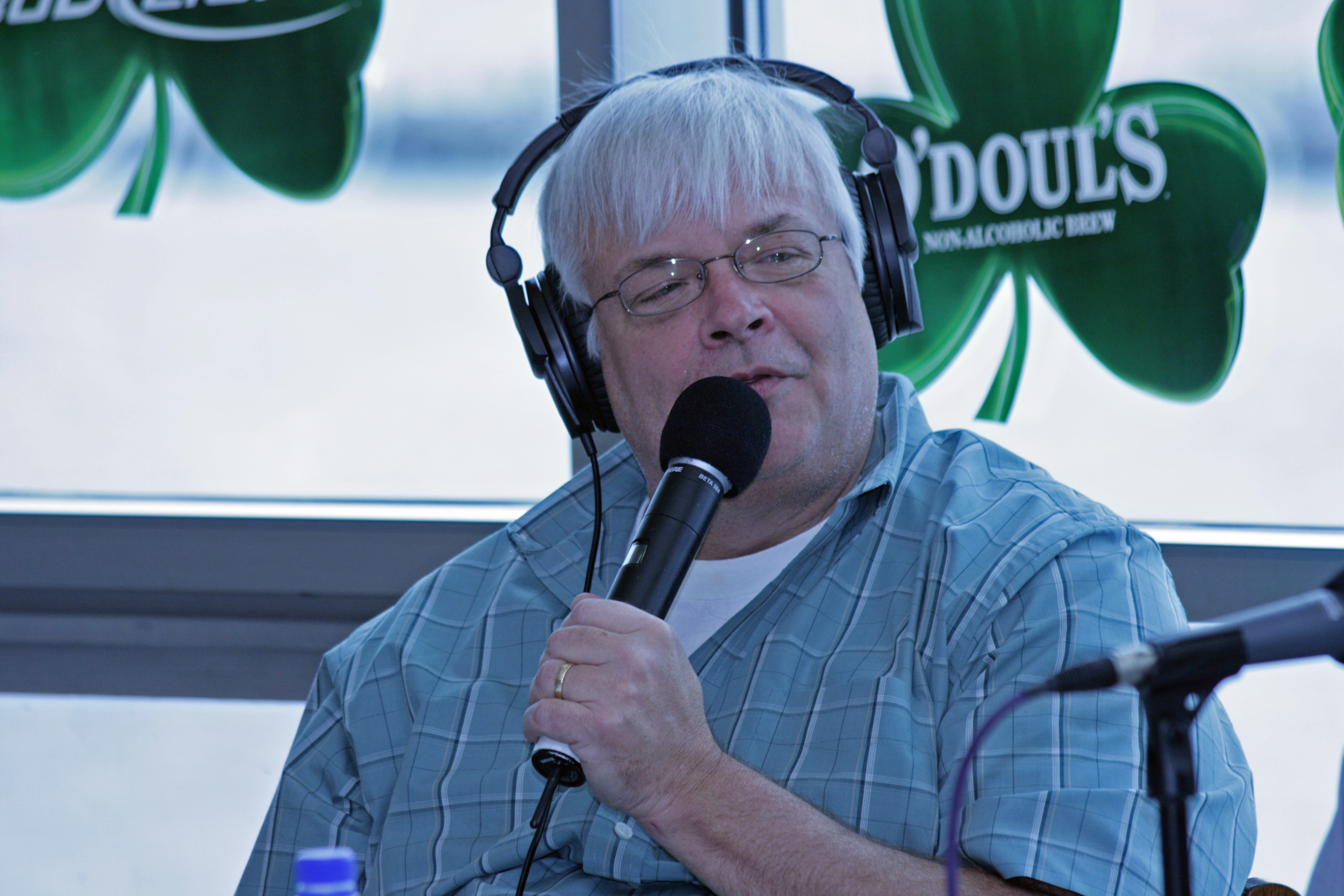
Steve Dahl in 2008

The day after the event, Dahl began his regular morning broadcast by reading the indignant headlines in the local papers. He mocked the coverage, saying: "I think for the most part everything was wonderful. Some maniac Cohos got wild, went down on the field. Which you shouldn't have done. Bad little Cohos." Tigers manager Anderson said of the events: "Beer and baseball go together, they have for years. But I think those kids were doing things other than beer." Columnist David Israel of the Chicago Tribune said on July 12 that he was not surprised by the events, writing: "It would have happened any place 50,000 teenagers got together on a sultry summer night with beer and reefer." White Sox pitcher Rich Wortham, a Texan, said: "This wouldn't have happened if they had country and western night."

Although Bill Veeck took much of the public criticism for the fiasco, his son Mike Veeck suffered repercussions as the front-office promoter. Mike remained with the White Sox until late 1980 when he resigned; his father sold the team to Jerry Reinsdorf soon afterward. He was unable to find another job in baseball for some time and claimed that he had been blackballed. For several years, he worked for a jai-alai court in Florida, battling alcoholism. As Mike said: "The second that first guy shimmied down the outfield wall, I knew my life was over!" Mike Veeck has since become the owner of minor league baseball teams. In July 2014, the Charleston RiverDogs, of whom Veeck is president, held a promotion involving the destruction of Justin Bieber and Miley Cyrus merchandise.

Dahl is still a radio personality in Chicago and also releases podcasts.

Contemporary news coverage framed the incident as both spectacle and debacle. The Chicago Tribune described the riot as predictable given the charged atmosphere and alcohol consumption, while national outlets such as the New York Times emphasized the unusual combination of music protest and baseball promotion. Radio commentators and sports columnists debated whether the fiasco represented youthful rebellion, poor event planning, or a cultural turning point in American popular music.

=== Cultural significance ===
The popularity of disco declined significantly in late 1979 and 1980. Many disco artists carried on, but record companies began labeling their recordings as dance music. Dahl stated in a 2004 interview that by 1979 disco was "probably on its way out. But I think Disco Demolition Night hastened its demise." According to Frank, "the Disco Demolition triggered a nationwide expression of anger against disco that caused disco to recede quickly from the American cultural landscape." Episode 3 of the 2024 PBS series Disco: Soundtrack of a Revolution notes that disco's popularity had already entered a general decline due in part to the public's negative perception of the scene's elitism and excesses, with many radio stations in the process of changing back from a Disco to a Rock format.

Rolling Stone critic Dave Marsh described Disco Demolition Night as "your most paranoid fantasy about where the ethnic cleansing of the rock radio could ultimately lead." Marsh was one who, at the time, deemed the event an expression of bigotry, writing in a year-end 1979 feature that "white males, eighteen to thirty-four are the most likely to see disco as the product of homosexuals, blacks, and Latins, and therefore they're the most likely to respond to appeals to wipe out such threats to their security. It goes almost without saying that such appeals are racist and sexist, but broadcasting has never been an especially civil-libertarian medium."

Nile Rodgers, producer and guitarist for the disco-era band Chic, likened the event to Nazi book burning. Gloria Gaynor, who had a huge disco hit with "I Will Survive", stated, "I've always believed it was an economic decision—an idea created by someone whose economic bottom line was being adversely affected by the popularity of disco music. So they got a mob mentality going." Harry Wayne Casey, singer for the disco act KC and the Sunshine Band, did not believe Disco Demolition Night was discriminatory and felt that Dahl was simply an "idiot."

University of East London professor Tim Lawrence wrote that the event was the culmination of the overproduction of disco, the investment by major record companies in music their heterosexual white executives did not like, and the "disco sucks" campaign, which he argued was homophobic, sexist and racist. Dahl denies that prejudice was his motivation for the event: "The worst thing is people calling Disco Demolition homophobic or racist. It just wasn't ... We weren't thinking like that." In a 2014 op-ed for Crain's Chicago Business, Dahl defended the event as "a romp, not of major cultural significance." He wrote that it had been "reframed" as prejudiced by a 1996 VH1 documentary about the 1970s, in a move he described as "a cheap shot made without exploration."

In response to Dahl's op-ed, WMAQ-TV political journalist Mark W. Anderson, who attended Disco Demolition at the age of 15, described the fear that white neighborhoods would be taken over by blacks and the anxiety around shifting pop culture trends. He wrote:

The chance to yell "disco sucks" meant more than simply a musical style choice. It was a chance to push back on a whole set of social dynamics that lay just beneath the surface of a minor battle between a DJ and a radio station that decided to change formats. More importantly, it was a chance for a whole lot of people to say they didn't like the way the world was changing around them, or who they saw as the potential victors in a cultural and demographic war.

Historian Joshua M. Zeitz noted that the demographic group attending the riots swung wildly in the 1980 presidential primaries and election, first supporting liberal Ted Kennedy in the Democratic primary, then the conservative Republican nominee Ronald Reagan in the general election, both times opposing President Jimmy Carter. Zeitz argued: "Viewed in this light, Disco Demolition Night supports an altogether different interpretation of the 1970s as a decade that saw ordinary Americans gravitate to radical grassroots alternatives, both left and right, out of frustration with the political center."

The unplayed second game remains the last American League game to be forfeited. The last National League game to be forfeited was on August 10, 1995, when a baseball giveaway promotion at Dodger Stadium went awry, forcing the Los Angeles Dodgers to concede the game to the St. Louis Cardinals. According to baseball analyst Jeremiah Graves, "To this day Disco Demolition Night stands in infamy as one of the most ill-advised promotions of all time, but arguably one of the most successful as 30 years later we're all still talking about it."

=== Game 1 ===
5:40 pm (CDT)
Team	1	2	3	4	5	6	7	8	9	R	H	E
Detroit Tigers	1	1	1	0	0	1	0	0	0	4	9	0
Chicago White Sox	0	1	0	0	0	0	0	0	0	1	5	2
WP: Pat Underwood (4–0) LP: Fred Howard (1–4) Sv: Aurelio López (5); Home runs: DET: None; CHW: None; Attendance: 47,795

==== Box score ====
Detroit	AB	R	H	RBI	BB	SO	AVG
Ron LeFlore, CF	5	0	2	0	0	0	.298
Lou Whitaker, 2B	4	1	0	0	1	0	.295
Rusty Staub, DH	3	1	1	0	1	1	.229
Jason Thompson, 1B	4	0	0	0	0	3	.266
Champ Summers, RF	3	1	2	0	1	0	.277
Jerry Morales, LF	4	1	2	1	0	0	.236
Lance Parrish, C	4	0	1	1	0	1	.275
Tom Brookens, 3B	4	0	1	1	0	0	.364
Alan Trammell, SS	4	0	0	0	0	0	.276
Team totals	35	4	9	3	3	5	.257

Detroit	IP	H	R	ER	BB	SO	HR	ERA
Pat Underwood (W, 4–0)	7 2/3	5	1	1	2	3	0	3.43
Aurelio López (S, 5)	1 1/3	0	0	0	0	2	0	3.00
Team totals	9	5	1	1	2	5	0	1.00

Chicago	AB	R	H	RBI	BB	SO	AVG
Alan Bannister, 2B	4	0	1	0	0	0	.327
Junior Moore, LF	4	0	1	0	0	0	.270
Chet Lemon, CF	3	0	1	0	1	0	.302
Lamar Johnson, 1B	3	0	0	0	1	1	.296
Wayne Nordhagen, DH	3	0	0	0	0	0	.261
Jorge Orta, PH-DH	1	0	0	0	0	0	.227
Rusty Torres, RF	3	1	1	0	0	0	.288
Claudell Washington, PH	1	0	0	0	0	1	.278
Jim Morrison, 3B	4	0	2	0	0	3	.233
Greg Pryor, SS	3	0	1	1	0	0	.286
Mike Colbern, C	3	0	0	0	0	0	.261
Team totals	32	1	5	1	2	5	.156

Chicago	IP	H	R	ER	BB	SO	HR	ERA
Fred Howard (L, 1–4)	5 1/3	6	4	2	2	4	0	3.67
Ed Farmer	3 2/3	3	0	0	1	1	0	4.94
Team totals	9	9	4	2	3	5	0	2.00

Game 2 forfeited to Detroit, 9–0.

== See also ==
- Hooliganism – Disruptive or unlawful behavior such as rioting, bullying, and vandalism
- The Last Days of Disco – A 1998 film about the end of the disco era
- Post-disco – Music genre
- Rockism and poptimism – Ideological arguments in music journalism
- Ten Cent Beer Night – 1974 Major League Baseball promotion
