= Laura Nativo =

American actress

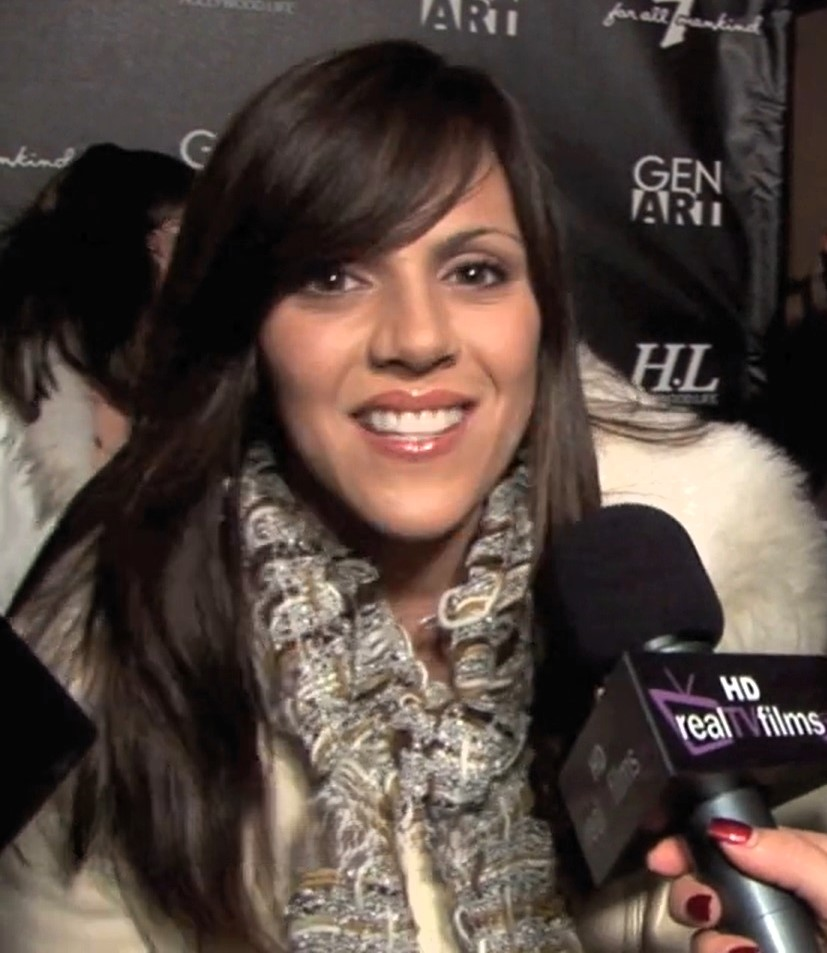
- Nativo in 2009
- Born: October 16, 1980 (age 46); Parsippany-Troy Hills, New Jersey

Laura Nativo (born October 16, 1980) is an American actress. She appeared in Aquanoids as the character Vanessa DuMont. In October 2026, she was the subject of a Los Angeles Times investigation into the potential misuse of funds earmarked for animal welfare.

== Filmography ==
=== Actress ===
- Celebrity (1998) as Jailbait (uncredited)
- High Voltage (2002) as Catholic Schoolgirl
- The Violent Kind (2002) as Wendy
- Bleed (2002) as Laura
- Aquanoids (2003) as Vanessa
- Birth Rite (2003) as Erin
- Delta Delta Die! (2003) as Infomercial Woman
- Comic Book: The Movie (2004) as herself
- Repo!: The Genetic Opera (2006) as Nurse
- Alpha Dog (2006) as Party Girl
- Threshold (2007) as Angel of Death

=== Producer ===
- Surf School (2006) executive producer
- Threshold (2007) producer
- Rule of Three (2008) co-producer

=== Music supervisor ===
- Surf School (2006)

== Greatest American Dog ==
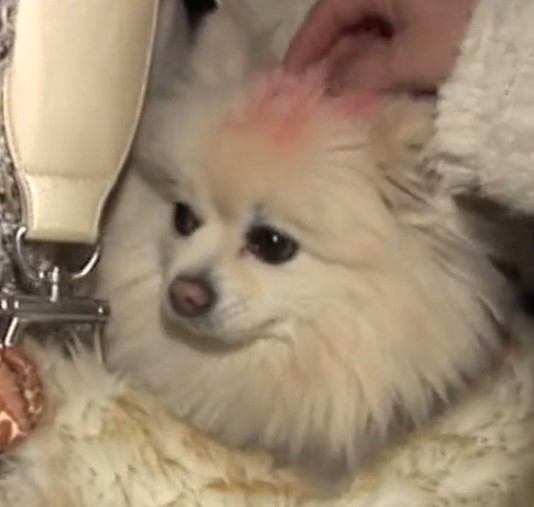
Nativo's dog, Preston Casanova, in 2009

In 2008, Nativo and her dog Preston competed on CBS' TV series Greatest American Dog for $250,000 and the title "Greatest American Dog." They were eliminated in the episode, "Salvador Doggy."

== Los Angeles Times Investigation ==
On October 23, 2026, The Los Angeles Times reported that Nativo had received about $9 million and a Malibu mansion from the estate of California ranching heir Alexander Lewis after Lewis's executor, Victoria Marie, met Nativo at a photoshoot. Nativo used the money to start Preston's Planet, a foundation designed to train and place service dogs with women and children. As of 2026, the foundation had not placed any service dogs and the advisory council had been dissolved.
