= Aquanoids =

- Directed by: Reinhart Peschke
- Written by: Mark J. Gordon; Eric Spudic
- Produced by: Albert Gordon; Mark J. Gordon
- Starring: Laura Nativo; Rhoda Jordan; Edwin Craig; Ike Gingrich
- Cinematography: Reinhart Peschke
- Edited by: Arturo Tejada
- Music by: Jason Peri
- Distributed by: Wildcat Entertainment
- Release date: 2003
- Running time: 78 minutes
- Country: United States
- Language: English

Aquanoids is a 2003 horror film directed by Reinhart "Ray" Peschke and starring Laura Nativo, Rhoda Jordan, Edwin Craig, and Ike Gingrich.

== Plot ==
In 1987, 17 people were killed by humanoid creatures called Aquanoids. These sea creatures seem to appear randomly and in 2003 return to Babylon Bay. The heroine of the story, Vanessa, sees the creatures and warns the town of the imminent danger. Vanessa's mother was one of the individuals killed in the first wave of attacks sixteen years ago. But the town's mayor, in an effort to acquire a major land deal for a new mall, tries to disguise the attacks as boating accidents.

Since it is July 4, many people are visiting the beach to enjoy the festivities. Vanessa desperately tries to ward off another mass killing by handing out fliers and even going on TV. She travels around on a popular motorized vehicle, the powered scooter. When the mayor's daughter is killed by an Aquanoid, he covers up the incident and executes the medical examiner. He even has to abort the Aquanoid baby she is carrying. The film ends with the Aquanoids being killed.

== Cast ==
- Laura Nativo as Vanessa DuMont
- Rhoda Jordan as Christina
- Laurence Hobbs as Jackson
- Edwin Craig as Frank Walsh
- Ike Gingrich as Clint Jefferson
- Suzan Spann as Courtney McClure
- Robert Kimmel as Stanze
- Christopher Irwin as Bruce

== Reception ==
Jon Condit of Dread Central rated the film 1.5/5 stars and wrote, "In the end, Aquanoids only has two things going for it. The first is the obvious enthusiasm of the cast. The second is a gorgeous young starlet in skimpy outfits. Neither one makes it worth going out your way to see, although the second one does come pretty close."

A review by Joshua Grover-David Patterson on FilmThreat wrote: "According to Cinemacabre’s web site, “Aquanoids 2” already is a go. Perhaps they can redeem themselves on a second go-round. A little more camp, a little more story, a little more fun, and maybe they can pull a better sea-beast out of the ocean."
