= Brain Blockers =

- Brain Blockers Poster
- Directed by: Lincoln Kupchak
- Written by: Lincoln Kupchak; Patrick Braithwaite; Keith Myers; Derek Anderson
- Produced by: Tim Everitt
- Starring: Timmi Cragg; Edwin Craig
- Music by: Brian Tuley
- Distributed by: Rivers of Blood Productions
- Release date: March 15, 2007
- Running time: 83 minutes
- Country: United States
- Language: English

Brain Blockers is a 2007 horror film directed by Lincoln Kupchak. Edwin Craig plays a professor who experiments on his college students and turns them into zombies.

== Plot ==
A college professor, Dr. Douglas Newton, develops an experimental drug named Tryptophan (not to be confused with real Tryptophan) that has the side effect of turning his students into bloodthirsty zombie-like creatures, leading them to eventually explode. It is up to a couple of grad students, Jenny Wayne and Joe Larsen, along with the local newspaper reporter Ray Elsworth, to uncover Dr. Newton's dark secret and thwart his plans before time runs out.

== Cast ==
- Timmi Cragg as Jenny Wayne
- Matt Shevin as Joe Larsen
- Edwin Craig as Dr. Douglas Newton
- Ned Liebl as Ray Elseworth
- Crystal Day as Becky
- Diora Baird as Suzi Klein
- Timothy L. Arnold as Tommy Martin
- Allison Evans as Emma Greenberg
- John W. Allen as John Cotton
- Jana Thompson as Shannon Braithwaite
- Jon Brooks as Billy Hobson
- Molly Hawkey as Lacey Wilcox
- Stacy Lynn Gabel as Rachel
- Kaley Dobson as Tammy
- John Klemantaski as Dr. Daniel Fannen
- Dillon Frehener as James Fannen

== Release ==
Brain Blockers was released on DVD on March 15, 2007. The DVD version contains deleted scenes, a still gallery and the "Brain Blockers" music video by the band Le Mans.

== Reception ==
Kryten Syxx of Dread Central rated the film 1/5 stars and called it one of the worst zombie Z movies that site had reviewed. Steve Anderson of Film Threat rated the film 1/5 stars and stated that the film fails at both horror and comedy. Academic Peter Dendle wrote that it is "a mind-numbing indie effort" with "inconsistent mutant creatures and awful special effects." A more positive review by Gavin Schmitt of Killer Reviews gave the film 3.5/5 stars and said "the overall story is really good" and singled out "the film`s seemingly endless supply of gorgeous women".
