= Rhoda Jordan =

American actress and screenwriter

Rhoda Jordan is an actress and screenwriter who has appeared in Never Die Alone with DMX, Aquanoids and Death Factory with Tiffany Shepis.

Rhoda Jordan wrote the screenplay for and played a supporting role in the film Rule of Three, which had its world premiere in July 2008 at the Fantasia Festival, and its U.S. premiere in September 2008 at Fantastic Fest.

In 2011, Jordan produced a short film adaptation of Jack Ketchum's short story "Mail Order."
