= Never Die Alone =

2004 film by Ernest Dickerson

- Theatrical release poster
- Directed by: Ernest Dickerson
- Written by: James Gibson
- Based on: Never Die Alone by Donald Goines
- Produced by: Alessandro Camon; DMX
- Starring: DMX; David Arquette; Michael Ealy
- Cinematography: Matthew Libatique
- Edited by: Stephen Lovejoy
- Music by: George Duke
- Distributed by: Fox Searchlight Pictures
- Release dates: January 19, 2004 (Sundance); March 26, 2004 (United States)
- Running time: 88 minutes
- Country: United States
- Language: English
- Box office: $5.9 million

Never Die Alone is a 2004 American crime thriller film directed by Ernest Dickerson and written by James Gibson, based on the 1974 novel of the same name by Donald Goines. The film stars DMX, David Arquette, and Michael Ealy.

Never Die Alone had its world premiere at the Sundance Film Festival on January 19, 2004, and was released in the United States on March 26, 2004, by Fox Searchlight Pictures. The film received generally negative reviews from critics who panned the trashy, pretentious and misogynistic viewpoint of street culture. However, DMX received praise for his performance as King David.

== Plot ==
Hardened criminal and drug dealer King David returns to New York City, where he can find redemption by settling an old score with drug lord Moon. He keeps tape-recorded journals about his life and is always talking about a woman named Edna. Upon David's return, he meets up with Jasper, a barkeep who expresses a strong dislike towards him. She contacts Moon to inform him of his return and willingness to pay his debt, as well as momentarily passing by Paul, a struggling writer.

Mike, one of Moon's henchmen, is assigned to collect his boss's money from David, appearing to be very interested in him for some reason. Before the deal, he is warned to not sabotage the deal to avert police attention. He, his friend Blue and his sister Ella go to David and collect the money. Mike is very tense upon arriving at the location of the pickup, prompting Blue to authorize it for him.

After a brief but tense transaction between Blue and David, the latter is set up for an ambush. Mike angrily demands that David recognizes him, and proceeds to stab him multiple times in the abdomen after receiving several taunts. A weakened David stabs Blue in the eye with an ice pick before they abandon him in a gutter. Paul, who passes by at that moment, drives David, a total stranger, to the hospital.

Paul is informed that King has died and has left him all his possessions. The items include jewelry, his car (which is a rare Stutz Blackhawk), and a collection of his audiotapes. Meanwhile, Moon is unnerved by Mike botching the deal by using violence against David and becomes paranoid of police attention.

After being informed of Blue's injury, he tells the two to wait in a parking garage for a car to come and drive them to the hospital. Instead, he sets them up as two henchmen shoot and kill Blue and Ella, to Mike's horror. Just before Mike can be killed himself, he gains gravity of the situation and guns down the henchmen but is unable to retain his sister's life as she dies in his arms. He then vows revenge against Moon for the double-cross.

As Paul listens to the journal, the story of David's life is told: after a particularly bad drug experience in the east, David relocated to the west in search of a second chance. He finds assistance with the Vietnamese and even a new girlfriend, Janet, whom he abuses. A television star, she turns to David's heroin and becomes sick and detached in the process. David abandons her as she presumably turns to selling his drugs to pay the bills and for her drug habit.

In the present, Moon sends out a duo of henchmen to kill Mike. Additionally, Moon learns of Paul's involvement in the situation from bystanders as his role as David's driver to the hospital, and requests for his murder, as well. Meanwhile, Paul continues to listen to the tapes; after he abandons Janet, David moves on to Juanita, a college student he meets in an upscale bar.

Their relationship goes well as David starts to make a lot of money. Juanita tries his drugs without getting addicted. She refuses to move in with David, insisting that she is just having fun with him and that his stash of $250,000 isn't enough on which to retire. Hurt and angry, David secretly switches her cocaine with heroin, getting her addicted.

Paul realizes that the money David talked about is in David's trunk. At the same time, Moon's henchmen are sprawling all over the city in search of him. Mike follows Moon's limo via cab to a secluded back alley, at which he follows him into a bathhouse and proceeds to kill him.

Paul listens to the last tape; David leaves Juanita, but she soon returns, addicted and begging for help. He agrees to help her, providing her a drug fix in exchange for rough, demeaning sex. The humiliation and disgrace shatter her dreams and causes her severe emotional distress, thus making her addictions even stronger. After a while, she demands that he pay for her entrance to rehabilitation or else she'll call the police. Enraged, David decides to do the same thing he did to Edna: mix her heroin with car battery acid, resulting in both dying in fatal seizures. Through a flashback, it is revealed that David is the biological father of Mike, who is also Edna's child, and that David brutally hit him before poisoning Edna (which explains the scar on his face). The tape ends with David speculating on how his return to the East Coast will bring about his redemption with Moon and tie the loose end with Edna's child, who he is completely unaware of as Mike in their second encounter.

Paul is found by Moon's henchmen, who hold him at gunpoint, but Mike arrives just in time and kills them. Paul tells Mike that King is his father, which greatly haunts the latter. As the police converge on the scene, Paul urges Mike to escape with King's car and reveals there is a 3 million dollar worth of drug money in the trunk before the two of them runs away from the scene. It is revealed that Mike has a son of his own. Shortly afterward, Paul writes a story based on that night, titled "Never Die Alone," which is turned down by a publishing magazine as the agent believes it to be a fictionalized story.

David was cremated soon after. His narration focuses on the end of his life and how fate had such a powerful effect on not only his life but also on the lives of Paul, Mike, Edna, Juanita, Moon, and everyone else. Meanwhile, Mike drives through a tunnel and escapes without capture as David closes his narration with "I wonder what lies ahead for me on the other side".

== Cast ==
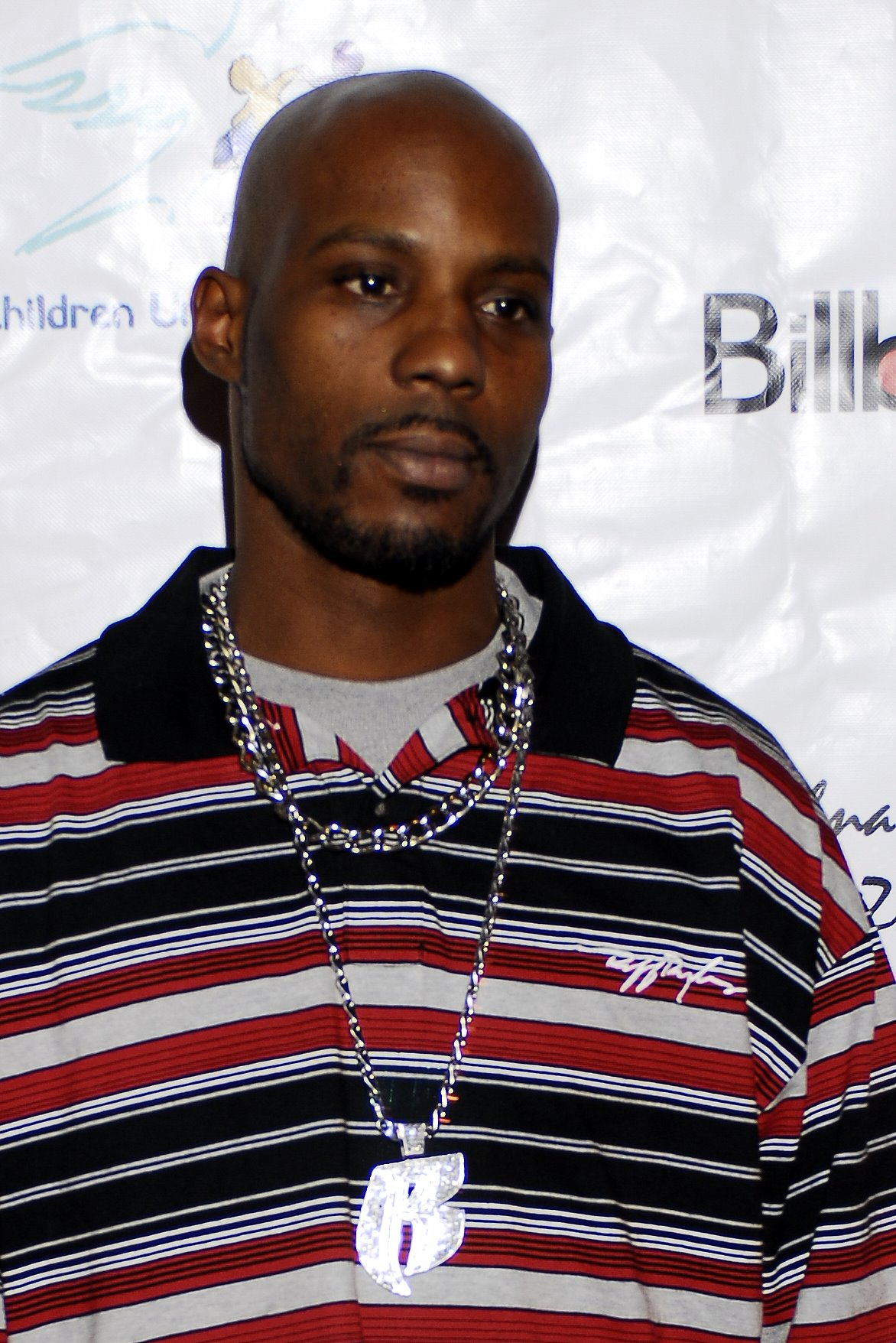
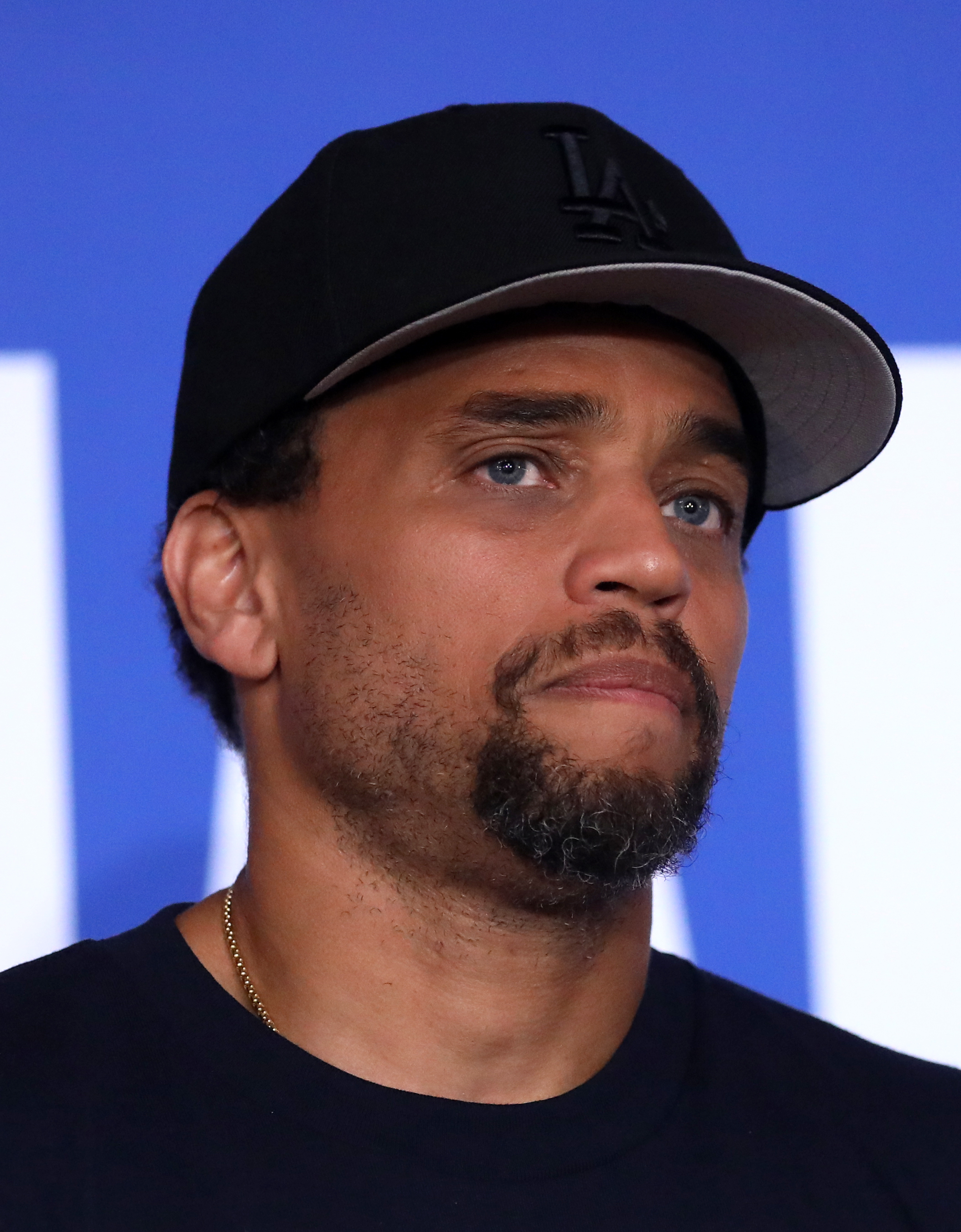
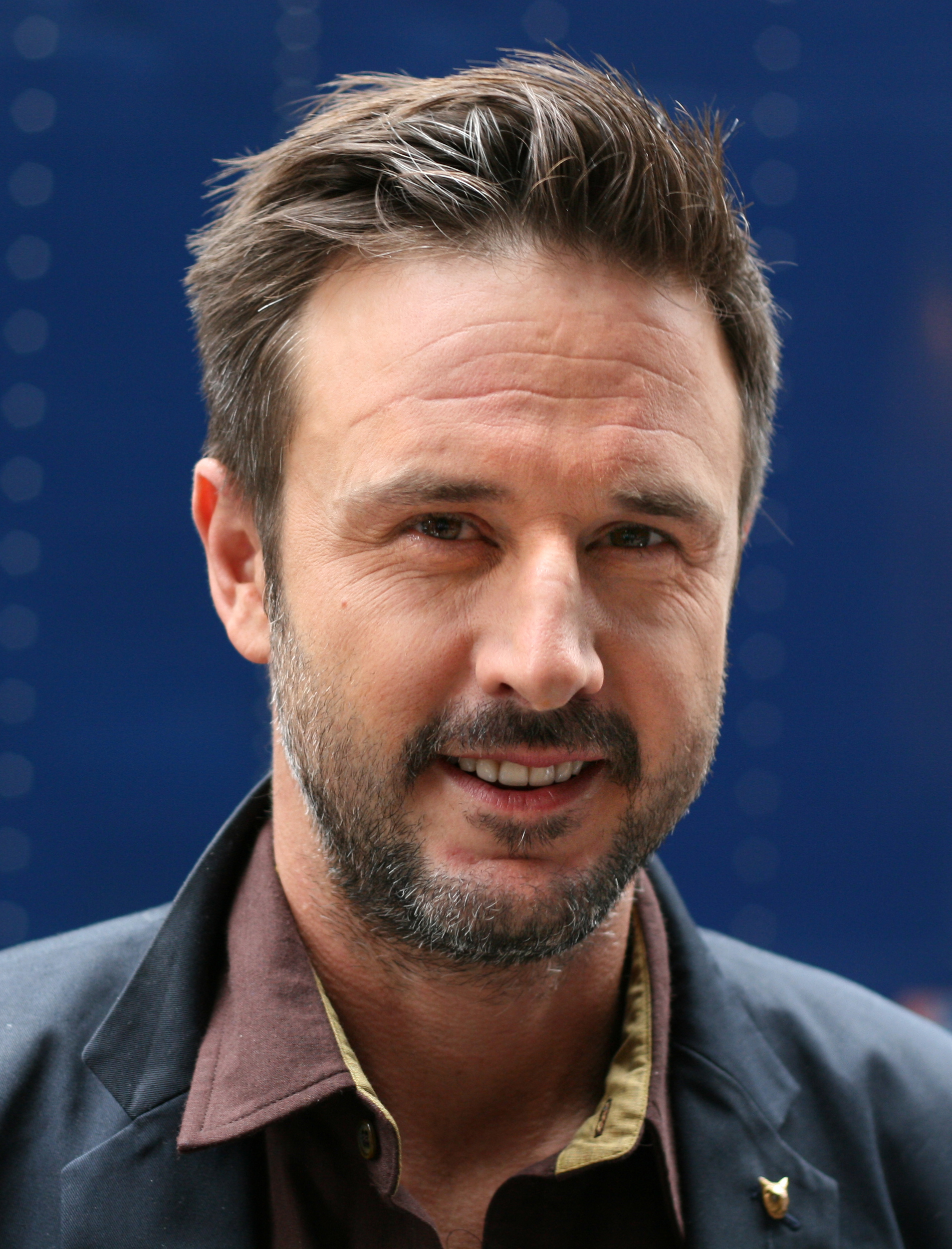
DMX, Michael Ealy, and David Arquette play David, Michael, and Paul respectively
- DMX as David "King David"
- Michael Ealy as Michael
- David Arquette as Paul
- Clifton Powell as "Moon"
- Reagan Gomez-Preston as Juanita
- Jennifer Sky as Janet
- Luenell as Jasper
- Drew Sidora as Ella
- Antwon Tanner as "Blue"
- Keesha Sharp as Edna
- Tommy Lister, Jr. as "Rockie"
- Aisha Tyler as Nancy
- Damion Portier as Alvin
- Jalil Jay Lynch as Earl
- Big Daddy Wayne as "Red"
- Art Evans as Mr. Waters
- Michele Shay as Juanita's Mother
- Eric Payne as Orderly
- Xavier Simmons as Young Michael
- Paige Hurd as Young Ella (uncredited)
- Rhoda Jordan as Brenda (uncredited)
- Henry Gibson as Funeral Home Director (uncredited)

== Music ==
The soundtrack features a mix of hip-hop, R&B, and soul tracks that reflect the gritty urban atmosphere of the film. It includes contributions from notable artists such as DMX, Lil Scrappy, Curtis Mayfield, and Teedra Moses, blending original compositions and licensed songs.

Never Die Alone (2004) OST
No.	Title	Performer(s)	Length
1.	"Go for Dat"	DMX featuring Lil Scrappy	2:53
2.	"Asinine"	(Associated Production Music)
3.	"Kung Fu"	Curtis Mayfield	6:13
4.	"Ballers"	(Associated Production Music)
5.	"Harvest"	Martin Blasick
6.	"Hustlaz Love Story"	Cruna	4:34
7.	"Pusherman"	Bilal	5:05
8.	"Like We Do"	(Associated Production Music)
9.	"Caught Up"	Teedra Moses	4:15
10.	"Head Bussa"	Lil Scrappy	3:57
11.	"I Want to Get Next to You"	Rose Royce	4:00
12.	"Action Quest"	(5 Alarm Music)	2:10
13.	"Cold Wind"	Rhoda Jordan
14.	"Funkalicious"	Martin Blasick & Mark Purdeaux
15.	"Seconds of Pleasure"	Van Hunt	7:05
16.	"Original P"	Martin Blasick
17.	"King Thing"	DMX	3:01
18.	"Vivaldi: Nisi Dominus R608: 4. Cum Dederit (Andante)"	Australian Brandenburg Orchestra / Andreas Scholl	5:18

== Reception ==
=== Box office ===
The film was a box office bomb upon release earning only $3.0 million at 1,160 theaters. It later went on to gross just $5.9 million by the end of its run.

=== Critical response ===
On the review aggregator website Rotten Tomatoes, the film holds a 26% approval rating based on 91 reviews with an average rating of a 4.4/10. The website's critical consensus reads: "DMX's menacing charisma is put to good use in this stylish but hackneyed modern-day noir." On Metacritic, the film scored a 38 out of 100 based on 28 critics, indicating "generally unfavorable reviews". Audiences polled by CinemaScore gave the film an average grade of "C+" on an A+ to F scale.

Some critics panned it as a trashy, pretentious look at a life of drug abuse and violence. Ted Fry of The Seattle Times was put off by the film's "despicable characterizations and hatefully misogynistic point of view" and also criticized "the excessive melodrama, lousy dialogue, clumsy acting, and generally nasty vibe," concluding that: "Dickerson does his talent a disservice by reaching for an operatic tone that's not supported by the material or his resources." Elizabeth Weitzman of the New York Daily News wrote: "Racist, misogynistic and breathtakingly cynical, [Ernest] Dickerson's clichéd crime drama Never Die Alone shamelessly exploits the degradation of its irredeemable characters." Marc Savlov of The Austin Chronicle called it "a misogynistic, dull-witted bore," criticizing Dickerson for using "every known hip-hop hoodlum cliché" throughout the film and also having "plain bad acting, camerawork (courtesy of Matthew Libatique, who keeps the grainy, dark feel of a poorly lit Super-8 running throughout), and even scoring." He concluded that: "If Never Die Alone had even a smidgeon of comic relief (or even, say, a bunch of zombies) to offset some of its relentlessly downbeat brutality, it might have been at best tolerable. But it doesn't, and it's not."

However, a number of critics found more value in the film. Most notably, movie critic Roger Ebert awarded the film three-and-a-half stars out of four, praising it as "an ambitious, introspective movie" that has "many characters [are] all drawn with care and dimension", calling it Dickerson's "best work to date, with the complexity of serious fiction and the nerve to start dark and stay dark, to follow the logic of its story right down to its inevitable end." Elvis Mitchell, writing for The New York Times, praised Dickerson for adding "street-corner majesty" to his direction and Libatique's "furious, high-contrast diffusion" cinematography for "elevating the look from a mere reiteration of music video fare", calling it "a riveting genre film that neatly exhibits the director's growing assurance – Donald Goines would be proud." Entertainment Weekly's Owen Gleiberman gave the film a B− grade, saying that despite the overall framing of the plot being "facile and second-rate", he gave praise to Dickerson for being "the rare filmmaker who can show the attraction — and degradation — of the criminal life without exploiting it."

DMX received praise for his role as King David. Ebert called it "a fearless performance", with Savlov saying he "admittedly does badass like a pro". Ruthe Stein of the San Francisco Chronicle wrote that: "DMX has all the charisma you'd expect of a music star, and he uses it to portray King David as larger than life." Mitchell wrote about DMX's performance: "To say that King David is the best role he's ever had is an understatement. Until now, he never seemed to feel the need to inhabit a movie in this way. He's committed himself to the displays of King David's cagey brutality, chalking up every slight as an act to be avenged."

== See also ==
- List of hood films
