= Death Factory (2002 film) =

2002 American horror film

- VHS cassette cover
- Directed by: Brad Sykes
- Written by: Brad Sykes
- Produced by: Paul DuPrey; Darrin Ramage; David S. Sterling
- Starring: Tiffany Shepis; Ron Jeremy; Lisa Jay; Karla Zamudio; Rhoda Jordan; Jason Flowers
- Cinematography: Benjamin Cooper (as "Lee Mann")
- Music by: Joe Gaal
- Distributed by: Brain Damage Films
- Release date: 2002
- Country: United States
- Language: English

Death Factory is a 2002 disaster horror slasher film featuring the story of six teenagers who sneak into an abandoned chemical factory where a disaster happened when they were all still children. It was written and directed by Brad Sykes, starring Lisa Jay, Karla Zamudio, Rhoda Jordan, Jeff Ryan, David Kalamus and Michael Okarma in the main character roles, while actress Tiffany Shepis plays antagonist Alexa. Supporting actors included a special appearance by Ron Jeremy as Glen the hobo. Death Factory was direct-to-video and received generally unfavourable reviews from critics, although it developed a cult following since its release, while followed by a 2008 sequel titled Death Factory: Bloodletting.

== Plot ==
Teenage couple Alyson and Josh are looking for a private place to make out, sneaking into a peculiar abandoned structure on the outskirts of town. They come upon a moldy sofa in an otherwise empty room; Alyson removes her shirt, and the pair proceed to initiate sex, but Josh is frightened by what looks to be a metal hand of some sort wrapping its way around the door frame. Fearing that they are being spied on, Josh backs out of the sex, annoying Alyson, who steps out into the hallway for a cigarette. She is grabbed by an unseen creature and dragged away. Josh goes looking for her, and finds her alive but soaked in blood. He reaches out to help her, but a tall woman with sharp teeth and steel scalpels affixed to her fingers leaps on him, opening his stomach and squeezing out his liver and intestines while Alyson screams.

Meanwhile, a college freshman name Rachel is invited to celebrate the completion of her first year with her five friends Louisa, Derek, Francis, Leticia, and Troy. Rachel has been childhood friends with Louisa for years, but while Rachel is studious and responsible, Louisa is a reputed troublemaker who carries a switchblade knife. She whips out the knife at Troy after he jokes about her being a lesbian, but she then lets him go. Francis has a crush on Leticia and hopes to hook up with her at the party that night, picking up the gang in his van. The six teens are unsure where a good place to party would be, prompting Louisa to suggest the Dyson Chemical Factory at the edge of town, which has been abandoned since the teens were small children.

In the factory, a hobo, Glen, stumbles drunk into the main lobby, looking for a safe place to crash. There he comes across a panicked Alyson, who warns him of Troy being murdered. Glen hugs her and tries to reassure her that she'll be alright, but the murderous woman who killed Josh then grabs Glen and tears out his beating heart, biting it and then attacking Alyson, killing her off-screen by biting her neck and drinking her blood. Rachel and her friends prepare for the party that same night, gathering supplies, and upon arrival, Louisa reveals the factory's history: Dyson Chemical had severely injured a worker in an industrial accident, and the worker became ill from the effects of the unknown toxin she had been exposed to, sent home without compensation. Presumed dead, she later returned to Dyson Chemical and slaughtered each of her colleagues, after which the factory was shut down. Rachel is bothered by the story, but tries to relax at the party, hoping to spend time with Derek alone. As the gang gets drunk and high on marijuana, Francis and Leticia wander off to a room with a rotting mattress, where they engage in long-winded sex.

As the party winds down, the murderous woman who killed Josh, Alyson, and Glen starts attacking the teens. She stabs Troy to death, castrates Francis by squishing his testicles until they pop, and then seeks out any other survivors, causing Rachel, Derek, Leticia and Louisa to flee. Leticia is cornered by the woman and has her eyes pressed in until she's blinded, while the remaining three teens escape into a hollow corridor. They find that the end of the corridor is sealed up with cinder blocks, and Derek tries to defend the girls by confronting the killer, only to be knocked unconscious and stabbed in the stomach. Louisa grabs Rachel, preventing her from leaving, and reveals that the killer's name is Alexa; Louisa was Alexa's kid sister, and has been luring victims to the factory for her since she was a child. To Louisa's shock, Alexa, who has no mental faculties left, attacks and kills her. Rachel is finally able to overpower Alexa by knocking her down and stabbing her with her own scalpel-accented hands. Rachel faints, later waking up in a hospital where the doctor informs her that she is the sole survivor of the massacre in the factory. Unbeknownst to Rachel, Alexa has also survived, and is still loose in the factory, waiting for more victims.

== Cast ==
- Tiffany Shepis as Alexa
- Ron Jeremy as Glen
- Lisa Jay as Rachel
- Karla Zamudio as Louisa
- Rhoda Jordan as Leticia
- Jason Flowers as Troy
- Allison Beal as Alyson
- Jeff Ryan as Derek
- David Kalamus as Francis
- Michael Okarma as Josh
- Garrett Clancy as Detective
- Graig Chandler as Doctor
- Uncredited extras were used as the staff of the Dyson Chemical Factory in flashback scenes.

== Production ==
Death Factory was filmed rapidly, over a period of six days, in Woodland Hills, Los Angeles, California. Tiffany Shepis's costume, which consisted of knife hands, sharp teeth, filthy hair, white eyes and a g-string, was provided by Shepis herself. Death Factory was also Lisa Jay's debut appearance, while seasoned porn star Ron Jeremy took the role of Glen.

== Reception ==
Death Factory received a limited release in America in 2002, followed by a 2004 direct-to-DVD release in Canada. The film received generally negative reviews from critics, but was praised for Ron Jeremy and Tiffany Shepis, as well as for making use of its small budget. Critic Adrian Halen said of the film, "Death Factory is a pretty simple film at best. The Director Brad Sykes established a location point and let the chaos ensue as the occupants slowly get killed off one after the other. Killing is usually brutal, bloody, and ends with our resident savage feeding into her victims necks. We are told later that “Alexa” survives by feeding off blood, but as a focal character it’s never really established if she is monster, vampire, zombie, or other. We make the assumption that science had “something” to do with it and leave it at. Actor Ron Jeremy makes a cameo as Glen the vagrant, and for the segment actually works it quite well. I’d say this in an OK product for a micro budget which fits into the category of better products that earlier Brain Damage Films had released." Radio review The Last Theater praised the film's unintentional comedic value, while heavily criticizing the characters, stating, "The party-goers consist of a sweet and naive young woman, her boring jock boyfriend who wants to sleep with her, a dangerous young woman who knows just enough about the abandoned location to get the group into trouble, a fun-loving guy and girl who use the party as an excuse to have sex in a gross location, and a tough loner who is smarter than he seems at first. So, pretty much like Night of the Demons minus a few characters... the characters are mind-numblingly dumb, separating themselves not once but twice after realizing one of their friends is dead, there’s a twist at the end that made me laugh with its ridiculousness, and the production values are cheap enough that we can clearly see the seams on the fake bricks that supposed to be part of the wall in an underground tunnel."

== Sequel ==
A 2008 sequel titled Death Factory: Bloodletting (sometimes stylized as "The Death Factory Bloodletting") was released that had very little connection to the original story.

== Home media ==
Death Factory was released on DVD video by Brain Damage Films, appearing as an import in non-United States locations. It also appears as a regular bootleg upload on YouTube.
