= Night Train (band) =

Australian rock band

- Origin: Canberra, ACT, Australia
- Genres: Rock
- Labels: SPE Records, Wizard Records
- Members: Clint Bopping; Scotty Masters; David Moon; Ben Schumann
- Past members: David Bishop; Dave Price; Andrew Ewart; Leigh Miller; Aaron Beutel

Night Train is a Canberra-based rock band, previously called Juggernaut 101.

== Band members ==
Current members

- Clint Bopping – vocals, bass (?–present)
- Scotty Masters – guitar (?–present)
- David Moon – guitar, backing vocals (?–present)
- Ben Schumann – drums (1981–present)

Former members

- David Bishop – vocals
- Dave Price – drums
- Andrew Ewart – bass
- Leigh Miller – bass
- Aaron Beutel

== Discography ==
=== Albums ===
As Juggernaut 101

- Red Headed Step Child (2001)

=== Extended plays ===
List of EPs, with selected details and chart positions
| Title | Details | Peak chart positions |
| Title | Details | AUS |
|---|---|---|
| Puzzle | Released: 2005; Format: CD, download; Label: MGM | 100 |

=== Singles ===
- "Black Sally Lane" (2005)
- "Be There" (2006)
- "One More Night" (2010)
