= Mike Veeck =

American baseball executive (born 1951)

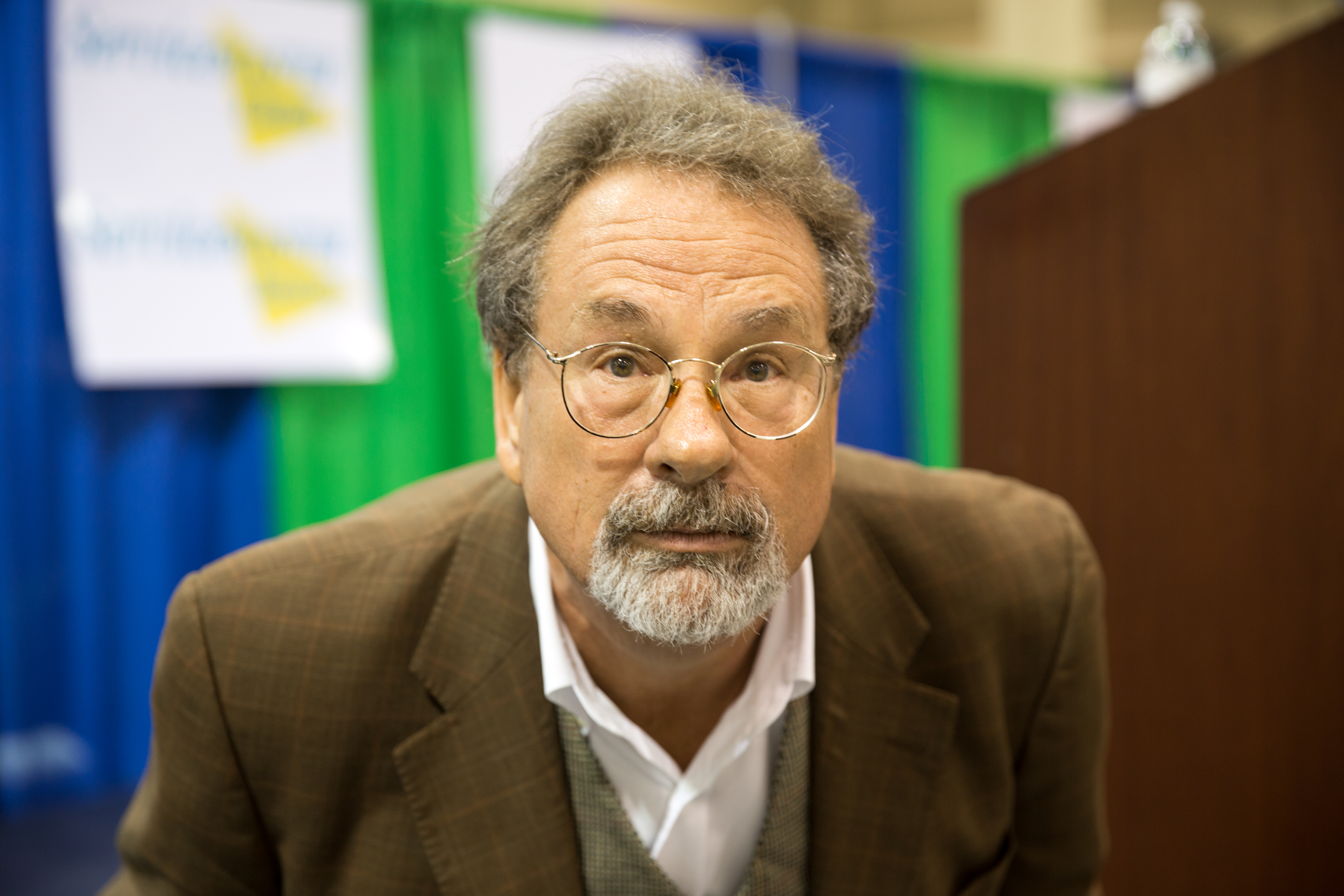
- Veeck at the North Charleston Business Expo in 2015
- Born: March 5, 1951 (age 75); Tucson, Arizona, U.S.
- Education: Loyola University Maryland
- Occupations: Baseball owner and executive
- Known for: Promoter of Disco Demolition Night
- Spouse: Libby Matthews
- Children: 2
- Parents: Bill Veeck (father); Mary Frances Ackerman (mother)
- Relatives: William Veeck Sr. (grandfather)

Michael Veeck (/vɛk/ VEK; born March 5, 1951) is an American professional baseball executive and team owner. Veeck has worked as an executive in Major League Baseball and has owned a number of Minor League Baseball teams. Veeck is best known as the architect of Disco Demolition Night. He is the son of Bill Veeck, Hall of Fame baseball owner.

== Early life ==
Veeck was born on March 5, 1951, in Tucson, Arizona. He was the third child of Bill Veeck and the eldest from his second marriage to Mary Frances Ackerman. Growing up in Maryland, he graduated from the Loyola University Maryland. He toured the United States with his band, The Chattanooga Glass Company.

== Career ==
Shortly after Mike's college graduation, Bill purchased the Chicago White Sox of Major League Baseball (MLB), and hired Mike as the team's director of marketing. On July 12, 1979, Veeck hosted "Anti-Disco Night" with radio presenter Steve Dahl, a promotion that led to the White Sox forfeiting their game against the Detroit Tigers after blowing up disco records on the field; the episode became known as Disco Demolition Night. Veeck left the White Sox when his father sold the team in 1980. He ran an advertising agency from 1980 to 1989.

In 1990, the Goldklang Group hired Veeck as president of the Miami Miracle, a Minor League Baseball team. After two seasons, Veeck moved the team to Fort Myers, Florida. Veeck became president of the St. Paul Saints in 1993 and brought in Max Patkin and the San Diego Chicken for entertainment in their inaugural season. In 1997, he signed pitcher Ila Borders, the first woman to pitch in professional baseball since Mamie Johnson in the Negro Leagues, and the first woman to play in Minor League Baseball. In July 2002, Veeck hosted "Nobody Night", where no fans were allowed in the park until the official attendance of zero was announced in the fifth inning. Veeck brought Minnie Miñoso out of retirement to play for the Saints on July 16, 2003, making him the first player to appear in professional games in seven different decades. On May 11, 2013, the Saints played a game with no umpires; instead, a "jury" of Little League Baseball players made the decisions. The Saints hosted the world's largest pillow fight on July 21, 2015, with 6,261 participants.

In 1998, Veeck returned to MLB when the Tampa Bay Rays hired him as their senior vice president of marketing and sales. He held the job for nine months. The Florida Marlins hired Veeck as a consultant in 2001, and in 2002, the Detroit Tigers hired him to be their senior vice president of marketing and communications and he held the job for three years. Veeck and the Goldklang Group sold the Saints to Diamond Baseball Holdings in 2023; the team became a minor league affiliate for the Minnesota Twins.

Veeck was the subject of the 2023 Netflix documentary, The Saint of Second Chances, which documented his struggles with alcohol and his comeback to baseball after the failed Anti-Disco Night promotion. The documentary was narrated by Jeff Daniels and directed by Morgan Neville and Jeff Malmberg.

== Personal life ==
Veeck and his wife Libby have two children: son William "Night Train" Veeck and daughter Rebecca. His daughter Rebecca was diagnosed with Batten disease which eventually left her blind and prompted Veeck to raise awareness of the condition. Rebecca Veeck died in 2019, aged 27, from complications from her condition. In her honor, her father threw "Rebecca Fest" at Joseph P. Riley Jr. Park, home field of the Charleston RiverDogs, on what would have been her 28th birthday.
