= Night Train (test) =

Chemical and biological warfare test in the US

Operation Night Train was part of a series of chemical and biological warfare tests overseen by the Deseret Test Center as part of Project 112. The test was conducted near Fort Greely, Alaska from November 1963 to January 1964. The primary purpose of Night Train was to study the penetration of an arctic inversion by a biological aerosol cloud. The test's first purpose was to study the downwind travel and diffusion of this cloud when disseminated into different arctic meteorological regimes. All documents about Night Train were considered classified by the US military until 2002, when the Department of Defense (DOD) released medically relevant information of all the chemical and biological warfare agent tests conducted under Project 112.

== Procedure ==
A total of 18 biological trials were conducted for Night Train. The trials, meant to study the spread and behavior of biological warfare agents in arctic conditions, were conducted in a temperature range of -39.3 to 3.3 °C. In all of these trials, Bacillus subtitles var. niger (also referred to as Bacillus globigii) was released as a biological warfare simulant, along with fluorescent particles of zinc cadmium sulfide as a tracer material. The trials tested both dry simulant and simulant released from a liquid biological spray tank in order to better investigate the behavior of the simulant in an arctic climate, as the behavior of wet versus dry agents varies based on humidity and other climatic conditions.

Of the 18, a series of 4 surface trials were conducted with dry B. globigii released from the back of a moving and tracked vehicle, accompanied by the release from contractor-flown aircraft of yellow and green fluorescent particles of zinc cadmium sulfide.

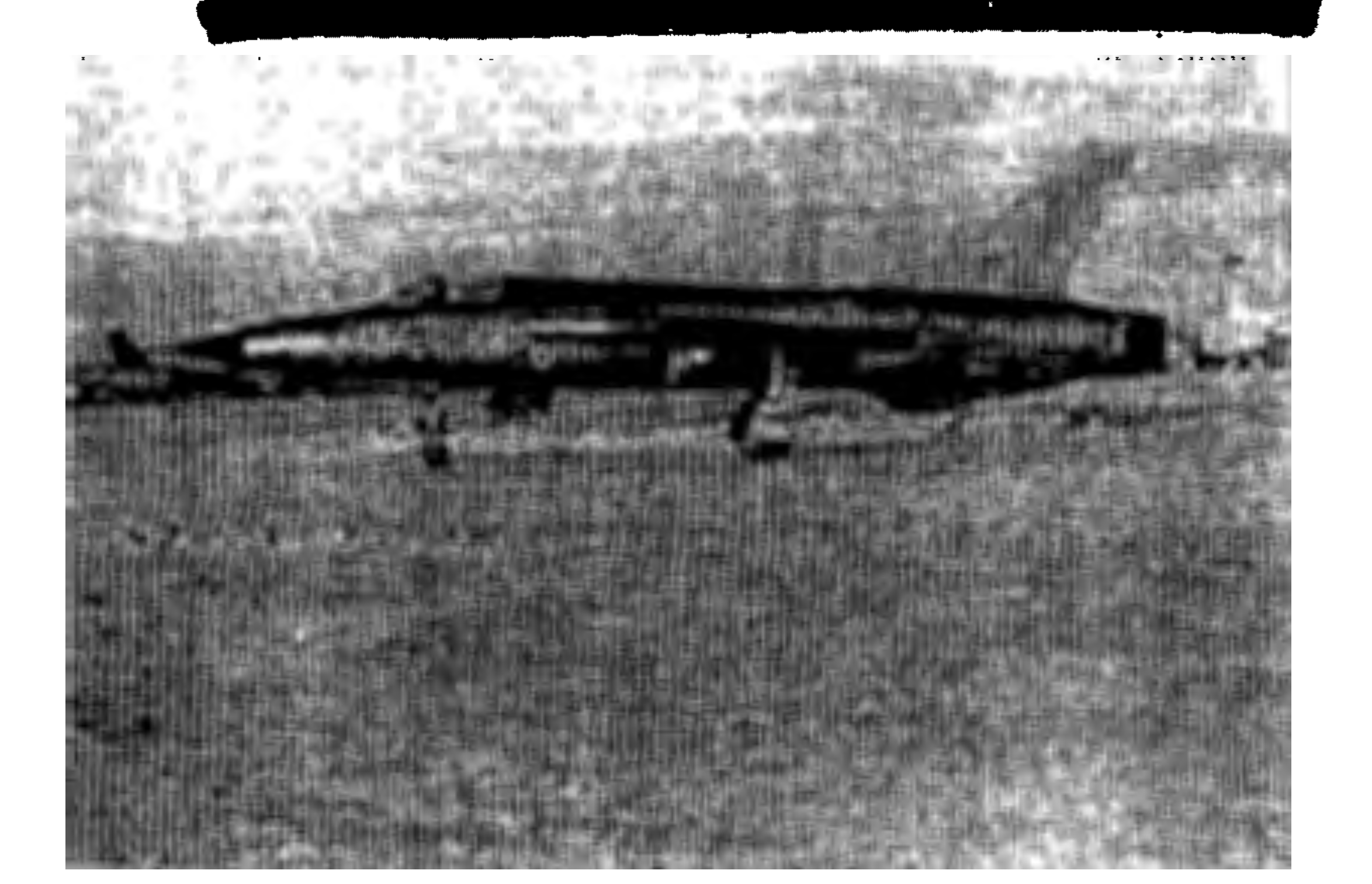
F-105 aircraft used in aerial dissemination of Bacillus globigii.

The remaining 14 trials involved the aerial release of B. globigii from the A/B45Y-1 liquid biological spray tank, an ejectable and aerodynamic store meant to disseminate and spray a liquid biological agent. The tank was carried on F-105 or F-100 aircraft, and was also accompanied by the release of fluorescent tracer particles.

== Controversy and subsequent partial declassification ==
The declassification of documents pertaining to Night Train and other Project 112 tests began in response to claims that veterans who were exposed to biological agents as a part of Project 112 were falling ill. Although Night Train used only a biological warfare simulant, which is considered harmless to healthy individuals, it has been acknowledged that B. globigii is an organism that can cause illness in those who are immunocompromised.

In order to address health claims, the VA contracted with the National Academy of Sciences to conduct an independent epidemiological study of participants in these tests as compared to veterans who did not participate. However, the VA sponsored study found no evidence that the health of veterans in exposure groups was significantly different from that of veterans who did not participate in the tests.

Approximately 5,500 servicemembers were unknowingly involved in Project 112 tests. Due to pressure from the Department of Veterans Affairs (VA), the DOD began to declassify medically relevant information regarding Night Train and other Project 112 tests that involved the exposure of military personnel to either biological or chemical simulants or active agents, though most of the information remains classified.

== See also ==
- Biological warfare
- Deseret Test Center
- Project 112
- Project SHAD
