= Night Train (painting) =

1947 painting by Paul Delvaux

- Le train de nuit (French)
- Artist: Paul Delvaux
- Year: 1947
- Dimensions: 153 cm × 210 cm (60 in × 83 in)
- Location: Museum of Modern Art, Toyama

Night Train (Le train de nuit) is a 1947 painting by Belgian artist Paul Delvaux, famous for his paintings of female nudes. The painting is 153 × 210 centimetres and is now in the Museum of Modern Art, in Toyama, in Japan.

Delvaux painted this artwork at a time when he felt trapped in a loveless marriage. He wished "to paint boredom, sadness and the desire to get away from it all... There is this nostalgic aspect about waiting rooms where people pass by briefly before leaving... I tried to capture the beauty of the waiting room in an empty station. People are not necessary, for a station has its own life".

According to Christie's, this work is "a powerful poetic expression of the overwhelming sense of paralysis and imprisonment Delvaux was experiencing at the time":

Depicting the stillness and ennui of a station waiting room infused with the languid erotic mystery of a sleeping nude and a lone train pulling into a station, the picture's main subject seems to be the articulation of a terrifying emptiness. The moonlit station clock and the empty gaze of the upright receptionist sitting to attention at her desk, echoed by her reflection in the mirror, seem to emphasize the frozen nature of time and space extending into infinity, while the nude lies bored and restless underneath a bleak sign advertising the endless cycle of arrivals and departures.
