= William Veeck Sr. =

American baseball executive

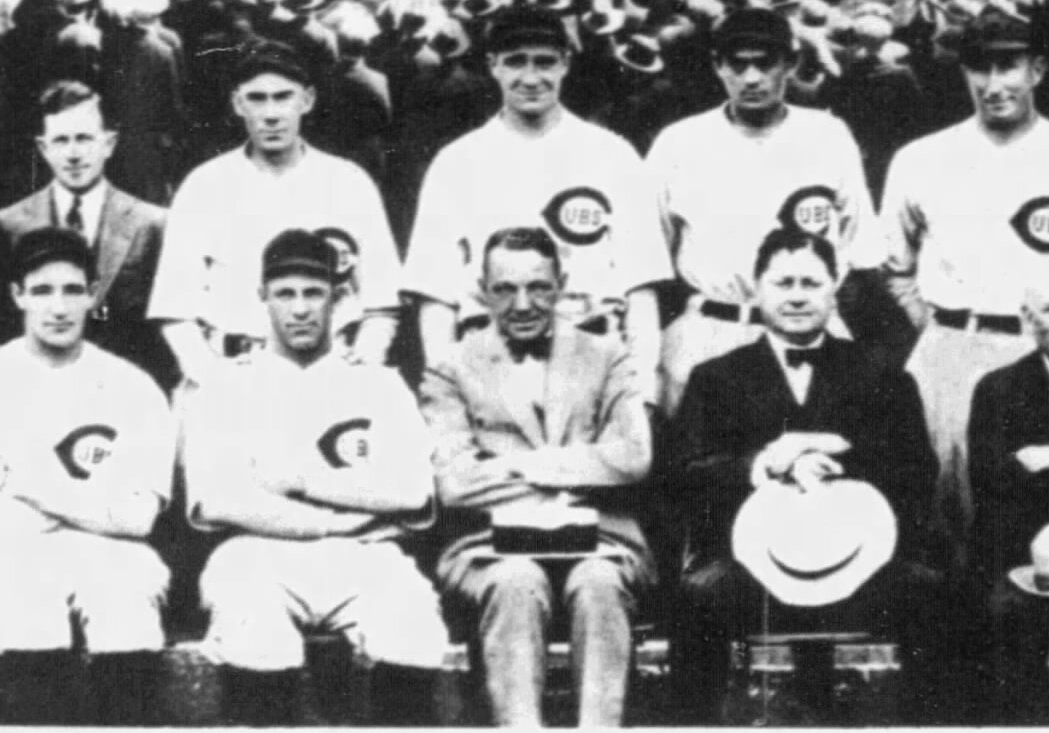
- Veeck, center of image, 1928
- Born: William Louis Veeck Sr. January 20, 1876
- Died: October 5, 1933 (aged 57)
- Occupations: Sportswriter, baseball executive
- Known for: President of the Chicago Cubs
- Spouse: Grace Greenwood DeForest (1900-1933)
- Children: 3, Maurice, Margaret Ann Veeck Krehbiel, Bill Veeck
- Relatives: Mike Veeck (grandson)

William Louis Veeck Sr. (January 20, 1876 – October 5, 1933) was an American sportswriter and baseball executive. He was president of the Chicago Cubs from 1919 to his death in October, 1933. Under Veeck's leadership, the Cubs won two pennants, in 1929 and 1932.

Veeck was a Chicago American sportswriter working under the pseudonym Bill Bailey before Cubs owner William Wrigley Jr. hired him to be vice-president of the baseball club in 1917. Having won the National League pennant in 1918, Wrigley promoted him to president of the club in July 1919.

In August 1933, Veeck proposed the introduction of midsummer inter-league play between National League and American League clubs that would count in the standings as a means to drive increased fan interest and attendance. It was observed at the time that the idea was not new, and many team owners vocalized support. While many teams held mid-season inter-league exhibition games in the 1930s, Major League Baseball would not introduce official games between the two leagues until the 1997 season.

Veeck resided in the Chicago suburb of Hinsdale, Illinois. He married Grace Greenwood DeForest in 1900. They had three children: Maurice, who died at age 8; Margaret Ann Veeck Krehbiel, and William Louis Veeck Jr., also known as Bill Veeck. Bill owned the Chicago White Sox and Cleveland Indians. His grandson Mike Veeck is also a minor league baseball executive.

Veeck Sr. is buried at the Bronswood Cemetery in Oak Brook, Illinois.

== Other sources ==
- Bill Veeck: Baseball genius
- Jack Bales, "Wrigley Jr. & Veeck Sr." WrigleyIvy.com.
- Jack Bales, "Baseball's First Bill Veeck," The Baseball Research Journal 42, no. 2 (Fall 2013): 7–16.
- Jack Bales, "'It Was His Fairness That Caught Wrigley’s Eye': William L. Veeck’s Journalism Career and His Hiring by the Chicago Cubs,” Nine: A Journal of Baseball History and Culture 20, no. 2 (Spring 2012): 1–14.
- Veeck's investigation into a fixed Cubs-Phillies game opens the door to the Black Sox scandal
