= Bill Veeck =

American baseball executive (1914–1986)

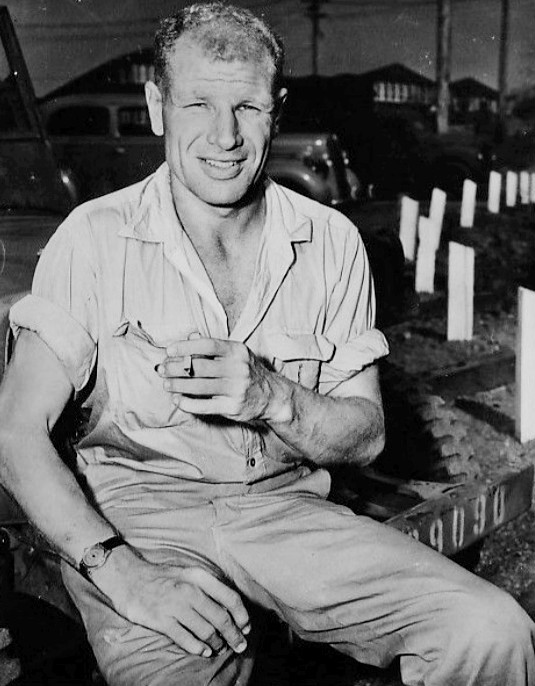
- Veeck in 1944 as he recuperated from his World War II injuries
- Born: William Louis Veeck Jr. February 9, 1914; Chicago, Illinois, U.S.
- Died: January 2, 1986 (aged 71); Chicago, Illinois, U.S.
- Education: Kenyon College (did not graduate)
- Spouses: Eleanor Raymond (m. 1935; div. 1949); Mary Frances Ackerman (m. 1950)
- Children: 9, including Mike
- Parent(s): William Veeck Sr. (father); Grace DeForest (mother)
- Baseball career

Career highlights and awards
- World Series champion (1948); Signed Larry Doby to the Indians and helped integrate the American League in 1947.; Cleveland Guardians Hall of Fame

Member of the National

Baseball Hall of Fame
- Induction: 1991
- Election method: Veterans Committee
Military career
Allegiance	United States
Branch	United States Marine Corps
Service years	1943–1946
Conflicts	World War II

William Louis Veeck Jr. (/vɛk/ VEK; February 9, 1914 – January 2, 1986), also known as "Sport Shirt Bill" and "Wild Bill" was an American Major League Baseball franchise owner and promoter. Veeck was at various times the owner of the Cleveland Indians, the St. Louis Browns, and the Chicago White Sox.

Veeck was the last owner to purchase a baseball franchise without an independent fortune and was responsible for many innovations and contributions to baseball. As owner and team president of the Indians in 1947, Veeck signed Larry Doby, thus beginning the integration of the American League, and the following year won a World Series title.

Unable to compete in the new era of salary escalation ignited by arbitration and free agency, Veeck sold his ownership interest in the White Sox after the 1980 season. He was inducted into the Baseball Hall of Fame posthumously in 1991.

== Early life ==
Bill Veeck was born on February 9, 1914, in Chicago. While Veeck was growing up in Hinsdale, Illinois, his father, William Veeck Sr., became president of the Chicago Cubs. Veeck Sr. was a local sports writer who wrote numerous columns about how he would run the Cubs differently, and the team's owner, William Wrigley Jr., took him up on the implied offer. While growing up, the younger Veeck worked as a popcorn vendor for the Cubs and also as a part-time concession salesman for the crosstown Chicago White Sox. Later, in 1937, he came up with the idea of planting ivy on the walls of Wrigley Field. Veeck attended Phillips Academy in Andover, Massachusetts. In 1933, when his father died, Veeck left Kenyon College and eventually became club treasurer for the Cubs. In 1935, he married his first wife, Eleanor.

== Franchise owner ==
=== Minor League Baseball ===
==== Milwaukee Brewers ====
In 1940, Veeck left Chicago and, in a syndicate with former Cubs star and manager Charlie Grimm, purchased the then-struggling Triple-A Milwaukee Brewers of the American Association. After winning three pennants in five seasons Veeck sold his Milwaukee franchise in 1945 for a $275,000 profit.

In his autobiography Veeck – As in Wreck, Veeck claimed to have installed a screen at Borchert Field to make the right field target a little more difficult for left-handed pull hitters of the opposing team. The screen was on wheels, so any given day it might be in place or not, depending on the batting strength of the opposing team. There was no rule against that activity as such, but Veeck then took it to an extreme, rolling it out when the opponents batted, and pulling it back when the Brewers batted. Veeck reported that the league passed a rule against it the very next day. However, extensive research by two members of the Society for American Baseball Research (SABR) suggests that this story was made up or certainly exaggerated by Veeck. The two researchers could not find any references to a moveable fence or any reference to the gear required for a moveable fence to work.

While a co-owner of the Brewers, Veeck served for nearly three years in the United States Marine Corps during World War II in an artillery unit. During this time a recoiling artillery piece crushed his right leg, requiring amputation first of the foot, and shortly after of the leg above the knee. Over the course of his life he had 36 operations on the leg. He had a series of wooden legs and, as an inveterate smoker, cut holes in them to use as ashtrays. Veeck also used the wooden leg in props such as a recreation of iconic Revolutionary War soldiers during the Bicentennial year of 1976. At other times, engaged in intensive trade talks with competing owners, Veeck would complain they were demanding "an arm and a leg" in negotiations, then unbuckle the leg and throw it on the desktop for dramatic effect.

=== Major League Baseball ===
==== Attempted purchase of Philadelphia Phillies ====
Veeck had been a fan of the Negro leagues since his early teens. He had also admired Abe Saperstein's Harlem Globetrotters basketball team, which was based in Chicago. Saperstein saved Veeck from financial disaster early on in Milwaukee by giving him the right to promote the Globetrotters in the upper Midwest in the winter of 1941–42.

In the fall of 1942, Veeck met with Gerry Nugent, president of the Philadelphia Phillies, to discuss the possibility of buying the struggling National League team. He later wrote in his memoirs that he intended to buy the Phillies and stock the team's roster with stars from the Negro leagues. Although no formal rules barred African-American players from the majors, none had appeared in organized baseball since the 1890s.

Veeck quickly secured financing to buy the Phillies, and agreed in principle to buy the team from Nugent. While on his way to Philadelphia to close on the purchase, Veeck decided to alert MLB Commissioner Kenesaw Mountain Landis of his intentions.

Veeck did not believe Landis would dare say black players were unwelcome while black soldiers were fighting in World War II. However, when Veeck arrived in Philadelphia, he was surprised to discover that the National League had taken over the Phillies and was seeking a new owner (the Phillies were ultimately sold to lumber baron William D. Cox).

The authors of a controversial article in the 1998 issue of SABR's The National Pastime argued that Veeck invented the story of buying the Phillies and filling their roster with Negro leaguers, claiming Philadelphia's black press made no mention of a prospective sale to Veeck.

Subsequently, the article was criticized by historian Jules Tygiel, who reviewed it point-by-point in an article in the 2006 issue of SABR's The Baseball Research Journal, and in an appendix, entitled "Did Bill Veeck Lie About His Plan to Purchase the '43 Phillies?", published in Paul Dickson's biography, Bill Veeck: Baseball's Greatest Maverick. In the SABR article, Tygiel explained that Veeck and others had mentioned the alleged scheme to buy and stock the Phillies up to fifteen years before the publication of Veeck's memoir, but conceded that, "In all of these accounts the only voice telling the story remains Veeck's." The Tygiel article also conceded, "The overall assessment of Jordan, et al. - that Veeck's notion of buying the Phillies and fielding a team of Negro League stars never quite moved as far from the drawing board as Veeck claimed - may still be true. We still lack any solid evidence that confirms that Veeck had not only conceptualized this action, but made a firm offer to buy the Phillies and met a rebuff by Landis and (then-National League president Ford) Frick."

==== Cleveland Indians ====
In 1946, having sold his interest in the Class AAA Milwaukee Brewers, Veeck became the owner of the major league Cleveland Indians. He immediately put all the team's games on radio (previously, only limited games had been broadcast). He also moved the team to Cleveland Municipal Stadium permanently in 1947. The team had split their games between the larger Municipal Stadium and the smaller League Park since the 1930s. However, Veeck concluded that League Park, which had been built in its final form in 1910, was far too small and deteriorated to be viable.

In July of that year, he signed Larry Doby, the first black player to play in the American League. Doby's first game was on July 5 and before the game, Doby was introduced to his teammates by player-manager Lou Boudreau. "One by one, Lou introduced me to each player. 'This is Joe Gordon,' and Gordon put his hand out. 'This is Bob Lemon,' and Lemon put his hand out. 'This is Jim Hegan,' and Hegan put his hand out. All the guys put their hand out, all but three. As soon as he could, Bill Veeck got rid of those three", Doby said. The following year Veeck signed Satchel Paige to a contract, making him the oldest rookie ever in MLB history.

To take advantage of the large size of Municipal Stadium, Veeck had a portable center field fence installed in 1947, which he could move in or out depending on how the distance favored the Indians against their opponents in a given series. The fence moved as much as 15 feet (5 m) between series opponents. Following the 1947 season, the American League countered with a rule change that fixed the distance of an outfield wall for the duration of a season.

As in Milwaukee, Veeck took a unique approach to promotions, hiring Max Patkin, the "Clown Prince of Baseball", as a coach. Patkin's appearance in the coaching box delighted fans and infuriated the front office of the American League. Although Veeck had become extremely popular, an attempt in 1947 to trade Boudreau to the St. Louis Browns led to mass protests and petitions supporting Boudreau. Veeck, in response, said he would listen to the fans, and re-signed Boudreau to a new two-year contract. Veeck claimed later that the trade talks had already broken down before they became public, but he seized the opportunity to promote the concept he had dropped the idea of the trade in response to public outcry.

By 1948, led by Boudreau's .355 batting average, Cleveland won its first pennant and World Series since 1920 (this remains the team's, now known as the Guardians, last World Series title). The following season, Veeck buried the 1948 flag once it became mathematically certain the team could not repeat its championship in 1949. Later that year, Veeck's first wife, Eleanor, filed for divorce. Most of his money was tied up in the Indians, so he was forced to sell the team to fund the divorce settlement. One year later, in 1950, Veeck married his second wife, Mary Frances Ackerman. He had met her the previous year while in Cleveland.

==== St. Louis Browns ====
After his second marriage, Veeck bought an 80% stake in the St. Louis Browns in 1951. Hoping to force the NL's St. Louis Cardinals out of town, Veeck hired Cardinal greats Rogers Hornsby and Marty Marion as managers, and Dizzy Dean as an announcer; and he decorated their shared home park, Sportsman's Park, exclusively with Browns memorabilia. Ironically the Cardinals had been the Browns' tenants since 1920, even though they had long since passed the Browns as St. Louis' favorite team.

Some of Veeck's most memorable publicity stunts occurred during his tenure with the Browns, including the appearance on August 19, 1951, by Eddie Gaedel, who had dwarfism and stood 3 feet 7 inches (1.09 m) tall and is the shortest person to appear in an MLB game. Veeck sent Gaedel to pinch hit in the bottom of the first inning of the second game of a double header. Wearing "1/8" as his uniform number, Gaedel was walked on four straight pitches and then was pulled for a pinch runner.

Shortly afterwards "Grandstand Manager's Day," involving Veeck, Connie Mack, and thousands of regular fans, enabled the crowd to vote on various in-game strategic decisions (i.e., steal, bunt, change pitchers) by holding up placards: the Browns won, 5–3, snapping a four-game losing streak.

After the 1952 season, Veeck suggested that the American League clubs share radio and television revenue with visiting clubs, a proposal anathema to the powerful Yankees, whose broadcasting revenues dwarfed those of all the other AL franchises. Outvoted, he refused to allow the Browns' opponents to broadcast games played against his team on the road. The league responded by eliminating the lucrative Friday night games in St. Louis.

A year later, Cardinals owner Fred Saigh was convicted of tax evasion. Facing certain banishment from baseball, he was forced to put the Cardinals up for sale. At first, the only credible offers came from out-of-town interests, and it appeared that Veeck would succeed in driving the Cardinals out of town. However, just as Saigh was about to sell the Cardinals to interests who would have moved them to Houston, Texas, he instead accepted a much lower bid from St. Louis-based brewing giant Anheuser-Busch, who entered the picture with the specific intent of keeping the Cardinals in town. It has long been claimed that Saigh was persuaded to accept Anheuser-Busch's bid more out of civic duty than money. However, according to Anheuser-Busch historian William Knoedelseder, Saigh's first preference all along was to sell the Cardinals to interests who would keep the team in St. Louis.

What is beyond dispute is that as soon as Anheuser-Busch closed on its purchase of the Cardinals, Veeck knew he was finished in St. Louis. He quickly realized that with Anheuser-Busch's wealth behind them, the Cardinals now had more financial resources than he could even begin to match, especially since he had no other source of income. Reluctantly, he decided to move the Browns elsewhere. As a preliminary step, he sold Sportsman's Park to the Cardinals, who would eventually rename it as the first incarnation of Busch Stadium.

At first Veeck considered moving the Browns back to Milwaukee (where they had played their inaugural season in 1901). Milwaukee recently built Milwaukee County Stadium in an attempt to entice a major league franchise.

However, the decision was in the hands of the Boston Braves, the parent team of the Brewers. Under Major League rules of the time, the Braves held the major league rights to Milwaukee. The Braves wanted another team with the same talent if the Brewers were shut down, and an agreement was not made in time for the start of the 1953 season. Ironically, a few weeks later, the Braves themselves moved to Milwaukee. St. Louis was known to want the team to stay, so some in St. Louis campaigned for the removal of Veeck.

Undaunted, Veeck got in touch with a group that was looking to bring a major league franchise to Baltimore, Maryland. After the 1953 season, Veeck agreed in principle to sell half his stock to Baltimore attorney Clarence Miles, the front man of the Baltimore group, and his other partners. He would have remained the principal owner, with approximately a 40% interest. Even though league president Will Harridge told him approval was certain, only four owners—two short of the necessary six for passage—supported it. Realizing the other owners simply wanted him out of the picture (indeed, he was facing threats of having his franchise canceled), Veeck agreed to sell his entire stake to Miles' group, who then moved the Browns to Baltimore, where they were renamed as the Orioles, which has been their name ever since.

==== Chicago White Sox ====
Taking advantage of inter-familial friction within the Comiskey family, in 1959, Veeck became head of a group that purchased a controlling interest in the Chicago White Sox. Following Veeck's acquisition of the team, the White Sox went on to win their first pennant in 40 years. That year the White Sox broke a team attendance record for home games with 1.4 million. The next year the team broke the same record with 1.6 million visitors to Comiskey Park with the addition of the first "exploding scoreboard" in the major leagues – producing electrical and sound effects, and shooting fireworks whenever the White Sox hit a home run. The "exploding scoreboard" was carried over to the "new" Comiskey Park (now Rate Field) when it opened in 1991.

One year later in 1960, Veeck and former Detroit Tigers great Hank Greenberg, his partner with the Indians and White Sox, reportedly made a strong bid for the American League expansion franchise in Los Angeles. Greenberg would have been the principal owner, with Veeck as a minority partner. However Los Angeles Dodgers owner Walter O'Malley was not willing to compete with a team owned by Veeck, even if he would only be a minority partner. When O'Malley heard of the deal, he invoked his exclusive franchise rights for Southern California. Any potential owner of an American League team in the area would have had to have O'Malley's approval, and it was apparent that O'Malley would not allow any team to set up shop with Veeck as a major shareholder. Rather than try to persuade his friend to back out, Greenberg abandoned his bid for what became the Los Angeles Angels.

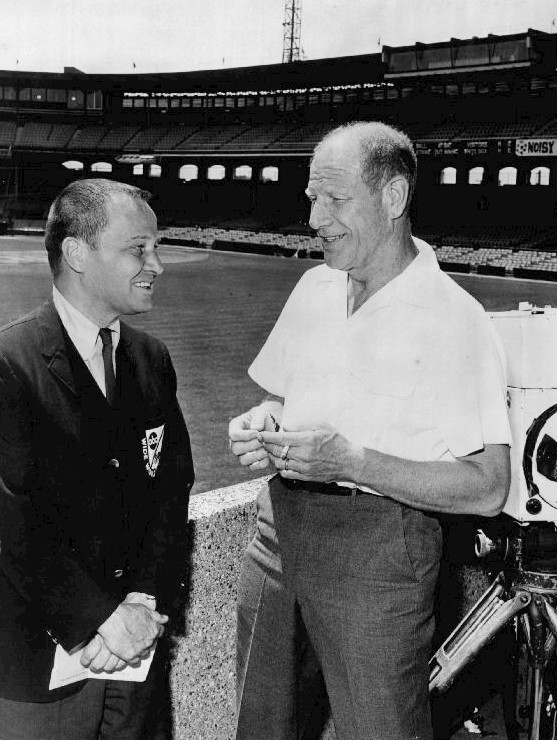
Veeck being interviewed by Jim McKay for Wide World of Sports in 1964.

In 1961, due to poor health, Veeck sold his share of the White Sox to John and Arthur Allyn for $2.5 million. After selling the White Sox, Veeck worked intermittently as a television commentator for ABC. Veeck then moved to the Eastern Shore of Maryland with his family to convalesce.

When his health improved, Veeck made an unsuccessful attempt to buy the Washington Senators, then operated the Suffolk Downs race track in Boston in 1969–70. He also tried to buy the Baltimore Orioles in 1974 but failed due to troubles with the IRS. Veeck was not heard from again in baseball ownership circles until 1975, when he repurchased the White Sox from John Allyn, the sole owner since 1969. Veeck's return rankled baseball's establishment, most owners viewing him as a pariah after exposing industry politics and maneuvering in his 1961 autobiography. The owners were also unhappy with Veeck's extensive unfavorable discussion of the 1964 purchase of the New York Yankees by CBS in 1965's The Hustler's Handbook, a move Veeck felt exposed MLB to dangerous antitrust liabilities and endangered the antitrust exemption established in a 1922 ruling by the U.S. Supreme Court. The White Sox were slated to move to Seattle, Washington for the amount of $14 million while Charlie O. Finley planned to move his Oakland Athletics to Chicago. However, Andy McKenna approached Veeck about the possibility of returning home to Chicago, which got Veeck to assemble an ownership group to make an offer for the team. On December 16, 1975, Veeck's group purchased the team from Allyn.

Almost immediately after reassuming control of the Sox, Veeck unleashed another publicity stunt. He and general manager Roland Hemond conducted four trades in a hotel lobby, in full view of the public; other owners considered this undignified. Two weeks later, however, arbitrator Peter Seitz's ruling struck down the reserve clause and ushered in the era of free agency, leading to dramatic increases in player salaries. Ironically, Veeck had been the only baseball owner to testify in support of Curt Flood during his landmark court case, at which Flood had attempted to gain free agency after being traded to the Phillies. Veeck had proposed a gradual transition to a free-agent system in which players would gain free agency rights after a certain amount of service time. The owners gambled that Seitz would rule in their favor and maintain the reserve clause; he did not.

On the field, Veeck presented a Bicentennial-themed "Spirit of '76" parade on Opening Day in 1976, casting himself as the peg-legged fifer bringing up the rear. The same year, he reactivated Minnie Miñoso for eight at-bats, to give Miñoso a claim towards playing in four decades; he did so again in 1980, to expand the claim to five. He also unveiled radically altered uniforms for the players, including clamdigger pants and even shorts, which the Sox wore for the first time against the Kansas City Royals on August 8, 1976.

In an attempt to adapt to free agency, he developed a "rent-a-player" model, centering on the acquisition of other clubs' stars in their option years. The gambit was moderately successful: in 1977 the White Sox won 90 games and finished in third place with additions such as Oscar Gamble and Richie Zisk.

During this last run, Veeck decided to have announcer Harry Caray sing "Take Me Out to the Ball Game" during the seventh-inning stretch. Veeck asked Caray to sing for the entire park, but he refused. Veeck replied that he already had a recording, so Caray would be heard either way. Caray reluctantly agreed to sing it live, accompanied by White Sox organist Nancy Faust, and went on to become famous for singing the tune, continuing to do so at Wrigley Field after becoming the broadcaster of the Chicago Cubs in 1982. This tradition has continued there, even after the death of Caray in 1998.

The 1979 season was filled with more promotions. On April 10, he offered fans free admission the day after a 10–2 Opening Day defeat by the Toronto Blue Jays. On July 12, Veeck, with assistance from son Mike and radio personality Steve Dahl, held one of his most infamous promotions, Disco Demolition Night, between games of a scheduled doubleheader, which resulted in a riot at Comiskey Park and a forfeit to the visiting Detroit Tigers.

== Life after baseball ==
Finding himself no longer able to financially compete in the free agent era, Veeck sold the White Sox in January 1981, albeit not without controversy, as his first choice in Edward J. DeBartolo Sr. (owner of the NHL's Pittsburgh Penguins and the NFL's San Francisco 49ers) was rejected by a league vote (eight votes in favor with ten required to pass). Veeck then sold the Sox to his second choice, Jerry Reinsdorf and partner Eddie Einhorn for $20 million. When Einhorn stated his desire to make the White Sox a "high-class operation", Veeck publicly transferred his allegiance back to the Chicago Cubs, the team his father had operated in his youth. (At any rate, after the White Sox won the 2005 World Series, the Veeck family received championship rings from the organization). Veeck retired to his home in Chicago but in summer could often be found in the Wrigley Field bleachers. Veeck also wrote occasional articles for magazines and newspapers, usually opining on the overall state of baseball.

== Declining health and death ==
Veeck had been a heavy smoker and drinker until 1980. In 1984, Veeck underwent two operations for lung cancer. Two years later, on the day after New Year's Day, 1986, he died at the age of 71 from cancer. He was posthumously elected five years later to the Baseball Hall of Fame.

Veeck was survived by his wife, Mary Frances, and eight of his nine children. Two of the surviving children, Peter and Ellen, were from his first marriage, and the others (Mike, Marya, Greg, Lisa, Julie and Chris) were from his second marriage. He was predeceased by his eldest child, William III, who died in 1985. His body was cremated. Mike Veeck became a minor league and independent baseball executive and was the co-founder of the St. Paul Saints, a successful charter member of the Northern League. The younger Veeck emulated many of his father's promotional stunts with the Saints. Greg Veeck earned a Ph.D. at the University of Georgia in 1988 and is a geography professor at Western Michigan University focusing on urban geology and East Asia. Peter was an entrepreneur who was the plaintiff in a notable case in copyright law, Veeck v. Southern Building Code Congress Int'l.

Mary Frances Veeck died in Hyde Park, Illinois, on September 10, 2022, at the age of 102.

== Books by Veeck ==
Veeck wrote three autobiographical works, each a collaboration with journalist and sportswriter Ed Linn. The first two were reissued in updated editions in the 1980s following Veeck's return to baseball ownership. The books include:

- Veeck as In Wreck (1962) – a straightforward autobiography, later updated after Veeck's then-declining health forced him to sell his interest in the White Sox.
- The Hustler's Handbook (1965) – a sequel and extension of Wreck, divulging his experiences in operating as an outsider in the major leagues, detailing many episodes of behind-the-scenes drama in baseball, including the 1965 acquisition of the New York Yankees by CBS and the maneuvering involved in the move of the Milwaukee Braves to Atlanta, and also a recounting of the 1919 Black Sox Scandal through a diary by Harry Grabiner, business manager of the White Sox in 1919 and much later, an associate of Veeck with the Indians in 1948.
- Thirty Tons a Day (1972) – chronicling the time he spent running Suffolk Downs racetrack in the late 1960s and early 1970s. The title refers to the daily quantity of waste (horse excrement, used hay and straw, etc.) that required disposal.

== Awards and honors ==
- 1948 World Series champion (as owner/president of the Cleveland Indians)
- National Baseball Hall of Fame and Museum (Class of 1991)
- The Baseball Reliquary's Shrine of the Eternals (class of 1999).
- In 2013, the Bob Feller Act of Valor Award honored Veeck as one of 37 Baseball Hall of Fame members for his service in the United States Marine Corps during World War II.
