= 1951 St. Louis Browns season =

Major League Baseball season

1951 St. Louis Browns
- League: American League
- Ballpark: Sportsman's Park
- City: St. Louis, Missouri
- Record: 52–102 (.338)
- League place: 8th
- Owners: Bill DeWitt, Bill Veeck
- General managers: Bill DeWitt, Bill Veeck
- Managers: Zack Taylor
- Television: KSD
- Radio: KWK (Buddy Blattner, Howard Williams)

The 1951 St. Louis Browns season involved the Browns finishing 8th in the American League with a record of 52 wins, and 102 losses.

== Regular season ==
=== Bill Veeck ===
Bill Veeck, the majority owner and manager of St. Louis Browns, signed Satchel Paige on July 17, 1951, and announced the 45-year-old would start the following night against the Washington Senators. In his first game back in the major leagues since 1949, Paige pitched six innings of shutout baseball before giving up three runs in the 7th inning. Paige ended the season with a 3–4 record and a 4.79 ERA.

Another of Veeck's promotions included the signing of Eddie Gaedel. Gaedel gained immortality in the second game of a doubleheader on Sunday, August 19. Weighing just 65 pounds (29 kg), and 3 feet 7 inches (1.09 m) tall, he became the shortest player in the history of the major leagues. He stood 3 feet 4 inches (1.02 m) shorter than Jon Rauch, whose height of 6 ft 11 in (2.11 m) made him the tallest person to play in a major league game. He had been secretly signed by the Browns and put in uniform (complete with elf slippers & the number "1/8 in (3.2 mm) on the back) as a publicity stunt.

Gaedel popped out of a papier-mache cake between games of a doubleheader to celebrate the American League's 50th anniversary, and as a Falstaff Brewery promotion. Falstaff, and the fans, had been promised a "festival of surprises" by Veeck. Before the second game got underway, the press agreed that the "midget-in-a-cake" appearance had not been up to Veeck's usual promotional standard. Falstaff personnel, who had been promised national publicity for their participation, were particularly dissatisfied. Keeping the surprise he had in store for the second game to himself, Veeck just meekly apologized.

Gaedel entered the game between the Browns and Detroit Tigers in the first inning as a pinch hitter for leadoff batter Frank Saucier. Immediately, umpire Ed Hurley called for Browns manager Zack Taylor. Veeck and Taylor had the foresight to have a copy of Gaedel's contract on hand, as well as a copy of the Browns' active roster, which had room for Gaedel's addition. Tigers pitcher Bob Cain walked him. Jim Delsing pinch ran for Gaedel, but did not score.

=== Ned Garver ===
In 1951, Ned Garver fashioned an outstanding season. Pitching for the Browns, Garver compiled a 20–12 record, which was noteworthy considering the Browns lost 102 games. Garver also posted a 3.73 ERA. Garver's wins accounted for nearly 40 percent of the Browns' 52 total wins. Garver also led the American League in complete games with 24 in 1951, and when he pitched he often batted sixth in the order rather than the customary ninth, compiling a .305 batting average with one home run.

Garver is the only pitcher in American League history to win 20 or more games for a team which lost 100 or more games in the same season, and the only pitcher in Major League history to do since 1920 or with a winning record.

=== Season standings ===
American League
Team	W	L	Pct.	GB	Home	Road
New York Yankees	98	56	.636	—	56‍–‍22	42‍–‍34
Cleveland Indians	93	61	.604	5	53‍–‍24	40‍–‍37
Boston Red Sox	87	67	.565	11	50‍–‍25	37‍–‍42
Chicago White Sox	81	73	.526	17	39‍–‍38	42‍–‍35
Detroit Tigers	73	81	.474	25	36‍–‍41	37‍–‍40
Philadelphia Athletics	70	84	.455	28	38‍–‍41	32‍–‍43
Washington Senators	62	92	.403	36	32‍–‍44	30‍–‍48
St. Louis Browns	52	102	.338	46	24‍–‍53	28‍–‍49

=== Record vs. opponents ===
1951 American League record Sources:
Team	BOS	CWS	CLE	DET	NYY	PHA	SLB	WSH
Boston	—	11–11	8–14	12–10	11–11	15–7	15–7	15–7
Chicago	11–11	—	12–10–1	12–10	8–14	9–13	15–7	14–8
Cleveland	14–8	10–12–1	—	17–5	7–15	16–6	16–6	13–9
Detroit	10–12	10–12	5–17	—	10–12	13–9	12–10	13–9
New York	11–11	14–8	15–7	12–10	—	13–9	17–5	16–6
Philadelphia	7–15	13–9	6–16	9–13	9–13	—	14–8	12–10
St. Louis	7–15	7–15	6–16	10–12	5–17	8–14	—	9–13
Washington	7–15	8–14	9–13	9–13	6–16	10–12	13–9	—

=== Notable transactions ===
- June 4, 1951: Don Lenhardt was traded by the Browns to the Chicago White Sox for Kermit Wahl and Paul Lehner.
- July 14, 1951: Satchel Paige was signed as a free agent by the Browns.
- July 21, 1951: Bob Nieman was purchased by the Browns from the Oklahoma City Indians.
- July 31, 1951: Ray Coleman was selected off waivers from the Browns by the Chicago White Sox.
- August 19, 1951: Eddie Gaedel was signed as an amateur free agent by the Browns.

=== Roster ===
1951 St. Louis Browns
Roster
Pitchers: 47 Tommy Byrne; 23 Cliff Fannin; 31 Ned Garver; 25 Bobby Herrera; 18 Bobby Hogue; 22 Don Johnson; 46 Bill Kennedy; 25,48 Bob Mahoney; 28 Duke Markell; 24,51 Jim McDonald; 26 Irv Medlinger; 40 Stubby Overmire; 22,49 Satchel Paige; 21 Duane Pillette; 28,50 Fred Sanford; 42 Sid Schacht; 39 Lou Sleater; 28 Dick Starr; 42 Jim Suchecki; 26 Bob Turley; 20 Al Widmar	Catchers: 10 Matt Batts; 11 Clyde Kluttz; 9 Sherm Lollar; 10 Les Moss; Infielders: 3 Hank Arft; 7 Johnny Berardino; 8 Johnny Bero; 1 Billy DeMars; 11 Mike Goliat; 6 Bill Jennings; 24 Dale Long; 18 Joe Lutz; 2 Fred Marsh; 8 Ben Taylor; 4 Bud Thomas; 4 Tom Upton; 23 Kermit Wahl; 5 Bobby Young	Outfielders: 17 Ray Coleman; 27 Jim Delsing; 1 Paul Lehner; 14 Don Lenhardt; 11 Jack Maguire; 46 Cliff Mapes; 19 Bob Nieman; 17 Earl Rapp; 16 Frank Saucier; 15 Roy Sievers; 12 Ken Wood; Other batters: 1/8 Eddie Gaedel	Manager: 38 Zack Taylor; Coaches: -- Fred Hofmann; 44 Ed Redys; 33 Jack Tobin; 34 Ralph Winegarner

== Player stats ==
= Indicates team leader

=== Batting ===
==== Starters by position ====
Note: Pos = Position; G = Games played; AB = At bats; H = Hits; Avg. = Batting average; HR = Home runs; RBI = Runs batted in

Pos	Player	G	AB	H	Avg.	HR	RBI
C	Sherm Lollar	98	310	78	.252	8	44
1B	Hank Arft	112	345	90	.261	7	42
2B	Bobby Young	147	611	159	.260	1	31
SS	Bill Jennings	64	195	35	.179	0	13
3B	Fred Marsh	130	445	108	.243	4	43
OF	Ken Wood	109	333	79	.237	15	44
OF	Jim Delsing	131	449	112	.249	8	45
OF	Ray Coleman	91	341	96	.282	5	55

==== Other batters ====
Note: G = Games played; AB = At bats; H = Hits; Avg. = Batting average; HR = Home runs; RBI = Runs batted in

Player	G	AB	H	Avg.	HR	RBI
Matt Batts	79	248	75	.302	5	31
Cliff Mapes	56	201	55	.274	7	30
Johnny Bero	61	160	34	.213	5	17
Tom Upton	52	131	26	.198	0	12
Jack Maguire	41	127	31	.244	1	14
Johnny Berardino	39	119	27	.227	0	13
Dale Long	34	105	25	.238	2	11
Don Lenhardt	31	103	27	.262	5	18
Earl Rapp	26	98	32	.327	2	14
Ben Taylor	33	93	24	.258	3	6
Roy Sievers	31	89	20	.225	1	11
Paul Lehner	21	67	9	.134	1	2
Les Moss	16	47	8	.170	1	7
Bob Nieman	12	43	16	.372	2	8
Joe Lutz	14	36	6	.167	0	2
Kermit Wahl	8	27	9	.333	0	3
Bud Thomas	14	20	7	.350	1	1
Jim Dyck	4	15	1	.067	0	0
Frank Saucier	18	14	1	.071	0	1
Mike Goliat	5	11	2	.182	0	1
Clyde Kluttz	4	4	2	.500	0	1
Billy DeMars	1	4	1	.250	0	0
Eddie Gaedel	1	0	0	----	0	0

=== Pitching ===
= Indicates league leader

==== Starting pitchers ====
Note: G = Games pitched; IP = Innings pitched; W = Wins; L = Losses; ERA = Earned run average; SO = Strikeouts

Player	G	IP	W	L	ERA	SO
Ned Garver	33	246.0	20	12	3.73	84
Duane Pillette	35	191.0	6	14*	4.99	65
Tommy Byrne	19	122.2	4	10	3.82	57
Jim McDonald	16	84.0	4	7	4.07	28
Stubby Overmire	8	53.1	1	6	3.54	13
Fred Sanford	9	27.1	2	4	10.21	7
Bob Turley	1	7.1	0	1	7.36	5

- Tied with five other pitchers

==== Other pitchers ====
Note: G = Games pitched; IP = Innings pitched; W = Wins; L = Losses; ERA = Earned run average; SO = Strikeouts

Player	G	IP	W	L	ERA	SO
Al Widmar	26	107.2	4	9	6.52	28
Jim Suchecki	29	89.2	0	6	5.42	47
Lou Sleater	20	81.0	1	9	5.11	33
Dick Starr	15	62.0	2	5	7.40	26
Bill Kennedy	19	56.0	1	5	5.79	29
Duke Markell	5	21.1	1	1	6.33	10
Don Johnson	6	15.0	0	1	12.60	8

==== Relief pitchers ====
Note: G = Games pitched; W = Wins; L = Losses; SV = Saves; ERA = Earned run average; SO = Strikeouts

Player	G	W	L	SV	ERA	SO
Satchel Paige	23	3	4	5	4.79	48
Bob Mahoney	30	2	5	0	4.44	30
Bobby Hogue	18	1	1	1	5.16	11
Cliff Fannin	7	0	2	0	6.46	11
Irv Medlinger	6	0	0	0	8.38	5
Sid Schacht	6	0	0	1	21.00	4
Bobby Herrera	3	0	0	0	27.00	1

== Farm system ==
Level	Team	League	Manager
AAA	Toronto Maple Leafs	International League	Joe Becker
AA	San Antonio Missions	Texas League	Jo-Jo White
A	Dayton Indians	Central League	Jim Crandall
B	Wichita Falls Spudders	Big State League	Bruce Ogrodowski and Cecil McClung
B	Anderson Rebels	Tri-State League	Len Schulte and Hillis Layne
C	Pine Bluff Judges	Cotton States League	Bob Richards
C	Aberdeen Pheasants	Northern League	Joe King, Jim Post and Bruce Ogrodowski
D	Redding Browns	Far West League	Ray Perry
D	Pittsburg Browns	Kansas–Oklahoma–Missouri League	Bill Enos
D	Ada Herefords	Sooner State League	Stan Gallo
D	Appleton Papermakers	Wisconsin State League	Joe Skurski and Paul Erickson

LEAGUE CHAMPIONS: Dayton
