= 1951 Boston Red Sox season =

Major League Baseball season

1951 Boston Red Sox
- League: American League
- Ballpark: Fenway Park
- City: Boston, Massachusetts
- Record: 87–67 (.565)
- League place: 3rd
- Owners: Tom Yawkey
- President: Tom Yawkey
- General managers: Joe Cronin
- Managers: Steve O'Neill
- Television: WBZ-TV, Ch. 4, and WNAC-TV, Ch. 7
- Radio: WHDH-AM 850 (Curt Gowdy, Bob DeLaney, Tom Hussey)
- Stats: ESPN.com; Baseball Reference

The 1951 Boston Red Sox season was the 51st season in the franchise's Major League Baseball history. The Red Sox finished third in the American League (AL) with a record of 87 wins and 67 losses, 11 games behind the New York Yankees, who went on to win the 1951 World Series.

== Offseason ==
- November 16, 1950: Joe DeMaestri was drafted from the Red Sox by the Chicago White Sox in the 1950 rule 5 draft.
- November 17, 1950: The Red Sox draft pitcher Paul Hinrichs.
- November 27, 1950: Former Cleveland Indians manager Lou Boudreau signs as a player for the Red Sox.
- December 11, 1950: A five-player trade between the Boston Red Sox and the Chicago White Sox sends pitchers Bill Wight and Ray Scarborough to the Red Sox in exchange for pitchers Joe Dobson and Dick Littlefield, as well as right fielder Allen Zarilla.
- December 13, 1950: The Cleveland Indians purchase catcher Birdie Tebbetts from the Red Sox for an undisclosed amount; The Boston Red Sox purchase catcher Mike Guerra from the Philadelphia Athletics.
- February 5, 1951: The Red Sox purchase catcher Al Evans from the Washington Senators off of waivers.
- Prior to 1951 season: Bob Smith was signed as an amateur free agent by the Red Sox.

== Regular season ==
=== Season standings ===
American League
Team	W	L	Pct.	GB	Home	Road
New York Yankees	98	56	.636	—	56‍–‍22	42‍–‍34
Cleveland Indians	93	61	.604	5	53‍–‍24	40‍–‍37
Boston Red Sox	87	67	.565	11	50‍–‍25	37‍–‍42
Chicago White Sox	81	73	.526	17	39‍–‍38	42‍–‍35
Detroit Tigers	73	81	.474	25	36‍–‍41	37‍–‍40
Philadelphia Athletics	70	84	.455	28	38‍–‍41	32‍–‍43
Washington Senators	62	92	.403	36	32‍–‍44	30‍–‍48
St. Louis Browns	52	102	.338	46	24‍–‍53	28‍–‍49

=== Record vs. opponents ===
1951 American League record Sources:
Team	BOS	CWS	CLE	DET	NYY	PHA	SLB	WSH
Boston	—	11–11	8–14	12–10	11–11	15–7	15–7	15–7
Chicago	11–11	—	12–10–1	12–10	8–14	9–13	15–7	14–8
Cleveland	14–8	10–12–1	—	17–5	7–15	16–6	16–6	13–9
Detroit	10–12	10–12	5–17	—	10–12	13–9	12–10	13–9
New York	11–11	14–8	15–7	12–10	—	13–9	17–5	16–6
Philadelphia	7–15	13–9	6–16	9–13	9–13	—	14–8	12–10
St. Louis	7–15	7–15	6–16	10–12	5–17	8–14	—	9–13
Washington	7–15	8–14	9–13	9–13	6–16	10–12	13–9	—

=== Opening Day lineup ===
7	Dom DiMaggio	CF
10	Billy Goodman	RF
9	Ted Williams	LF
5	Vern Stephens	SS
3	Walt Dropo	3B
1	Bobby Doerr	2B
4	Lou Boudreau	SS
11	Buddy Rosar	C
15	Bill Wight	P

=== Roster ===
1951 Boston Red Sox
Roster
Pitchers: 25 Bill Evans; 36 Ben Flowers; 24 Paul Hinrichs; 25 Harley Hisner; 25 Leo Kiely; 16 Ellis Kinder; 20 Walt Masterson; 19 Mickey McDermott; 21 Willard Nixon; 17 Mel Parnell; 18 Ray Scarborough; 22 Chuck Stobbs; 12 Harry Taylor; 15 Bill Wight	Catchers: 14 Matt Batts; 2 Al Evans; 8 Mike Guerra; 14 Les Moss; 8 Aaron Robinson; 11 Buddy Rosar; 38 Sammy White; Infielders: 4 Lou Boudreau; 1 Bobby Doerr; 3 Walt Dropo; 10 Billy Goodman; 27 Fred Hatfield; 2 Mel Hoderlein; 6 Johnny Pesky; 34 Al Richter; 5 Vern Stephens; 35 Norm Zauchin	Outfielders: 7 Dom DiMaggio; 39 Bob DiPietro; 26 Charlie Maxwell; 21 Karl Olson; 23 Clyde Vollmer; 9 Ted Williams; 28 Tom Wright	Manager: 30 Steve O'Neill; Coaches: 32 Earle Combs (First base); 33 Eddie Mayo (Third base); 31 Paul Schreiber (Hitting); 29 George Susce (Bullpen)

== Player stats ==
=== Batting ===
==== Starters by position ====
Note: Pos = Position; G = Games played; AB = At bats; H = Hits; Avg. = Batting average; HR = Home runs; RBI = Runs batted in

Pos	Player	G	AB	H	Avg.	HR	RBI
C	Les Moss	71	202	40	.198	3	26
1B	Walt Dropo	99	360	86	.239	11	57
2B	Bobby Doerr	106	402	116	.289	13	73
SS	Johnny Pesky	131	480	150	.313	3	41
3B	Vern Stephens	109	377	113	.300	17	78
OF	Ted Williams	148	531	169	.318	30	126
OF	Dom DiMaggio	146	639	189	.296	12	72
OF	Clyde Vollmer	115	386	97	.251	22	85

==== Other batters ====
Note: G = Games played; AB = At bats; H = Hits; Avg. = Batting average; HR = Home runs; RBI = Runs batted in

Player	G	AB	H	Avg.	HR	RBI
Billy Goodman	141	546	162	.297	0	50
Lou Boudreau	82	273	73	.267	5	47
Buddy Rosar	58	170	39	.229	1	13
Fred Hatfield	80	163	28	.172	2	14
Charlie Maxwell	49	80	15	.188	3	12
Aaron Robinson	26	74	15	.203	2	7
Tom Wright	28	63	14	.222	1	9
Mike Guerra	10	32	5	.156	0	2
Matt Batts	11	29	4	.138	0	2
Al Evans	12	24	3	.125	0	2
Mel Hoderlein	9	14	5	.357	0	1
Norm Zauchin	5	12	2	.167	0	0
Sammy White	4	11	2	.182	0	0
Al Richter	5	11	1	.091	0	0
Bob DiPietro	4	11	1	.091	0	0
Karl Olson	5	10	1	.100	0	0

=== Pitching ===
==== Starting pitchers ====
Note: G = Games pitched; IP = Innings pitched; W = Wins; L = Losses; ERA = Earned run average; SO = Strikeouts

Player	G	IP	W	L	ERA	SO
Mel Parnell	36	221.0	18	11	3.26	77
Chuck Stobbs	34	170.0	10	9	4.76	75
Leo Kiely	17	113.1	7	7	3.34	46
Harley Hisner	1	6.0	0	1	4.50	3

==== Other pitchers ====
Note: G = Games pitched; IP = Innings pitched; W = Wins; L = Losses; ERA = Earned run average; SO = Strikeouts

Player	G	IP	W	L	ERA	SO
Ray Scarborough	37	184.0	12	9	5.09	71
Mickey McDermott	34	172.0	8	8	3.35	127
Willard Nixon	33	125.0	7	4	4.90	70
Bill Wight	34	118.1	7	7	5.10	38
Harry Taylor	31	81.1	4	9	5.75	22

==== Relief pitchers ====
Note: G = Games pitched; W = Wins; L = Losses; SV = Saves; ERA = Earned run average; SO = Strikeouts

Player	G	W	L	SV	ERA	SO
Ellis Kinder	63	11	2	16	2.55	84
Walt Masterson	30	3	0	2	3.34	39
Bill Evans	9	0	0	0	4.11	3
Paul Hinrichs	4	0	0	0	21.60	1
Ben Flowers	1	0	0	0	0.00	2

== Farm system ==
Level	Team	League	Manager
AAA	Louisville Colonels	American Association	Pinky Higgins
AA	Birmingham Barons	Southern Association	Red Marion
A	Scranton Red Sox	Eastern League	Jack Burns
B	Roanoke Ro-Sox	Piedmont League	Wally Millies
C	San Jose Red Sox	California League	Marv Owen
C	Oneonta Red Sox	Canadian–American League	Owen Scheetz
D	High Point-Thomasville Hi-Toms	North Carolina State League	Jim Gruzdis
D	Marion Red Sox	Ohio–Indiana League	Elmer Yoter

LEAGUE CHAMPIONS: Birmingham, Oneonta, High Point-Thomasville, Marion
