= 1951 Detroit Tigers season =

Major League Baseball season

1951 Detroit Tigers
- League: American League
- Ballpark: Briggs Stadium
- City: Detroit, Michigan
- Record: 73–81 (.474)
- League place: 5th
- Owners: Walter Briggs, Sr.
- General managers: Billy Evans
- Managers: Red Rolfe
- Television: WWJ (Harry Heilmann, Paul Williams, Ty Tyson)
- Radio: WJBK/WXYZ (Paul Williams, Ty Tyson)

The 1951 Detroit Tigers season was a season in American baseball. The team finished fifth in the American League with a record of 73–81, 25 games behind the New York Yankees.

== Offseason ==
- January 20, 1951: Marv Grissom and George Vico were traded by the Tigers to the Seattle Rainiers for Wayne McLeland.

== Regular season ==
On August 19, the Tigers played a doubleheader in St. Louis against the Browns. In the second game, after the Tigers had batted in the top of the first inning, the Browns sent midget Eddie Gaedel up to pinch-hit for leadoff batter Frank Saucier. Gaedel, at a height of 3'7", is to date the shortest player to appear in a Major League Baseball game. Umpire Ed Hurley challenged the decision to allow Gaedel to participate in an at-bat. Browns manager Zack Taylor produced a copy of Gaedel's contract. Tigers pitcher Bob Cain walked him. Jim Delsing pinch ran for Gaedel, but failed to score. The Tigers won the game, 6–2.

=== Season standings ===
American League
Team	W	L	Pct.	GB	Home	Road
New York Yankees	98	56	.636	—	56‍–‍22	42‍–‍34
Cleveland Indians	93	61	.604	5	53‍–‍24	40‍–‍37
Boston Red Sox	87	67	.565	11	50‍–‍25	37‍–‍42
Chicago White Sox	81	73	.526	17	39‍–‍38	42‍–‍35
Detroit Tigers	73	81	.474	25	36‍–‍41	37‍–‍40
Philadelphia Athletics	70	84	.455	28	38‍–‍41	32‍–‍43
Washington Senators	62	92	.403	36	32‍–‍44	30‍–‍48
St. Louis Browns	52	102	.338	46	24‍–‍53	28‍–‍49

=== Record vs. opponents ===
1951 American League record Sources:
Team	BOS	CWS	CLE	DET	NYY	PHA	SLB	WSH
Boston	—	11–11	8–14	12–10	11–11	15–7	15–7	15–7
Chicago	11–11	—	12–10–1	12–10	8–14	9–13	15–7	14–8
Cleveland	14–8	10–12–1	—	17–5	7–15	16–6	16–6	13–9
Detroit	10–12	10–12	5–17	—	10–12	13–9	12–10	13–9
New York	11–11	14–8	15–7	12–10	—	13–9	17–5	16–6
Philadelphia	7–15	13–9	6–16	9–13	9–13	—	14–8	12–10
St. Louis	7–15	7–15	6–16	10–12	5–17	8–14	—	9–13
Washington	7–15	8–14	9–13	9–13	6–16	10–12	13–9	—

=== All-Star Game ===
The 1951 All-Star Game was originally awarded to the Philadelphia Phillies. The City of Detroit was celebrating the 250th anniversary of its founding in 1701 and requested to host the year's All-Star Game. Although the National League was scheduled to host the game in '51, the game was moved to Detroit's Briggs Stadium to coincide with the city's celebration. The Phillies instead hosted the 1952 All-Star Game at Shibe Park.

=== Roster ===
1951 Detroit Tigers
Roster
Pitchers: 37 Gene Bearden; 15 Hank Borowy; 21,23,31 Bob Cain; 31 Paul Calvert; 34 Ted Gray; 20 Ray Herbert; 29 Fred Hutchinson; 18 Earl Johnson; 37 Dick Marlowe; 19 Wayne McLeland; 16 Hal Newhouser; 23 Saul Rogovin; 24,42 Marlin Stuart; 11 Dizzy Trout; 22 Virgil Trucks; 25 Hal White	Catchers: 26 Joe Ginsberg; 35 Frank House; 1 Aaron Robinson; 9 Bob Swift; Infielders: 8 Neil Berry; 46 Al Federoff; 7 George Kell; 17 Don Kolloway; 30 Dick Kryhoski; 2 Johnny Lipon; 4 Jerry Priddy	Outfielders: 14 Hoot Evers; 3 Johnny Groth; 27 Charlie Keller; 6 Pat Mullin; 12 Steve Souchock; 18 Russ Sullivan; 5 Vic Wertz; Other batters: 21 Doc Daugherty	Manager: 10 Red Rolfe; Coaches: 28 Dick Bartell; 36 Rick Ferrell; 33 Ted Lyons

== Player stats ==
=== Batting ===
==== Starters by position ====
Note: Pos = Position; G = Games played; AB = At bats; H = Hits; Avg. = Batting average; HR = Home runs; RBI = Runs batted in

Pos	Player	G	AB	H	Avg.	HR	RBI
C	Joe Ginsberg	102	304	79	.260	8	37
1B	Dick Kryhoski	119	421	121	.287	12	57
2B	Jerry Priddy	154	584	152	.260	8	57
SS	Johnny Lipon	129	487	129	.265	0	38
3B	George Kell	147	598	191	.319	2	59
OF	Hoot Evers	116	393	88	.224	11	46
OF	Vic Wertz	138	501	143	.285	27	94
OF	Johnny Groth	118	428	128	.299	3	49

==== Other batters ====
Note: G = Games played; AB = At bats; H = Hits; Avg. = Batting average; HR = Home runs; RBI = Runs batted in

Player	G	AB	H	Avg.	HR	RBI
Pat Mullin	110	295	83	.281	12	51
Don Kolloway	78	212	54	.255	1	17
Bud Souchock	91	188	46	.245	11	28
Neil Berry	67	157	36	.229	0	9
Bob Swift	44	104	20	.192	0	5
Aaron Robinson	36	82	17	.207	0	9
Charlie Keller	54	62	16	.258	3	21
Frank House	18	41	9	.220	1	4
Russ Sullivan	7	26	5	.192	1	1
Al Federoff	2	4	0	.000	0	0
Doc Daugherty	1	1	0	.000	0	0

=== Pitching ===
==== Starting pitchers ====
Note: G = Games pitched; IP = Innings pitched; W = Wins; L = Losses; ERA = Earned run average; SO = Strikeouts

Player	G	IP	W	L	ERA	SO
Ted Gray	34	197.1	7	14	4.06	131
Fred Hutchinson	31	188.1	10	10	3.68	53
Hal Newhouser	15	96.1	6	6	3.92	37
Saul Rogovin	5	24.0	1	1	5.25	5

==== Other pitchers ====
Note: G = Games pitched; IP = Innings pitched; W = Wins; L = Losses; ERA = Earned run average; SO = Strikeouts

Player	G	IP	W	L	ERA	SO
Dizzy Trout	42	191.2	9	14	4.04	89
Virgil Trucks	37	153.2	13	8	4.33	89
Bob Cain	35	149.1	11	10	4.70	58
Marlin Stuart	29	124.0	4	6	3.77	46
Wayne McLeland	6	11.0	0	1	8.18	0
Dick Marlowe	2	1.2	0	1	32.40	1

==== Relief pitchers ====
Note: G = Games pitched; W = Wins; L = Losses; SV = Saves; ERA = Earned run average; SO = Strikeouts

Player	G	W	L	SV	ERA	SO
Hal White	38	3	4	4	4.74	23
Gene Bearden	37	3	4	0	4.33	38
Hank Borowy	26	2	2	0	6.95	16
Earl Johnson	6	0	0	1	6.35	2
Ray Herbert	5	4	0	0	1.42	9
Paul Calvert	1	0	0	0	0.00	0

== Farm system ==
Level	Team	League	Manager
AAA	Toledo Mud Hens	American Association	Jack Tighe
AA	Little Rock Travelers	Southern Association	Gene Desautels
A	Williamsport Tigers	Eastern League	Schoolboy Rowe
B	Durham Bulls	Carolina League	Ace Parker
B	Davenport Tigers	Illinois–Indiana–Iowa League	Marv Olson
D	Richmond Tigers	Ohio–Indiana League	Ralph DiLullo
D	Jamestown Falcons	PONY League	Tony Lupien
D	Wausau Lumberjacks	Wisconsin State League	Bob Benish
