= 1951 Brooklyn Dodgers season =

1951 Brooklyn Dodgers
- League: National League
- Ballpark: Ebbets Field
- City: Brooklyn, New York
- Record: 97–60 (.618)
- League place: 2nd
- Owners: Walter O'Malley (majority owner); James & Dearie Mulvey, Mary Louise Smith
- President: Walter O'Malley
- General managers: Buzzie Bavasi
- Managers: Chuck Dressen
- Television: WOR-TV
- Radio: WMGM; Red Barber, Connie Desmond, Vin Scully

The 1951 Brooklyn Dodgers season was the 62nd season for the Brooklyn Dodgers franchise in the MLB. The Dodgers led the National League for much of the season, holding a 13-game lead as late as August. However, a late season collapse and a hot streak by the New York Giants led to a classic three-game playoff series. Bobby Thomson's dramatic ninth-inning home run off Dodger reliever Ralph Branca in the final game of a tie-breaker series won the pennant for the Giants and was immortalized as the Shot Heard 'Round the World.

== Offseason ==
- October 10, 1950: Chuck Connors and Dee Fondy were traded by the Dodgers to the Chicago Cubs for Hank Edwards and cash.
- October 13, 1950: Buddy Hicks was purchased from the Dodgers by the Philadelphia Phillies.
- November 16, 1950: Morrie Martin was drafted from the Dodgers by the Philadelphia Athletics in the 1950 rule 5 draft.
- February 6, 1951: Chico Fernández was signed by the Dodgers as an amateur free agent.

== Regular season ==
=== Season standings ===
National League
Team	W	L	Pct.	GB	Home	Road
New York Giants	98	59	.624	—	50‍–‍28	48‍–‍31
Brooklyn Dodgers	97	60	.618	1	49‍–‍29	48‍–‍31
St. Louis Cardinals	81	73	.526	15½	44‍–‍34	37‍–‍39
Boston Braves	76	78	.494	20½	42‍–‍35	34‍–‍43
Philadelphia Phillies	73	81	.474	23½	38‍–‍39	35‍–‍42
Cincinnati Reds	68	86	.442	28½	35‍–‍42	33‍–‍44
Pittsburgh Pirates	64	90	.416	32½	32‍–‍45	32‍–‍45
Chicago Cubs	62	92	.403	34½	32‍–‍45	30‍–‍47

=== Record vs. opponents ===
1951 National League record Sources:
Team	BSN	BRO	CHC	CIN	NYG	PHI	PIT	STL
Boston	—	10–12–1	10–12	10–12	8–14	12–10	13–9	13–9
Brooklyn	12–10–1	—	14–8	14–8	14–11	15–7	10–12	18–4
Chicago	12–10	8–14	—	10–12	7–15	7–15	9–13	9–13–1
Cincinnati	12–10	8–14	12–10	—	5–17	11–11	12–10–1	8–14
New York	14–8	11–14	15–7	17–5	—	16–6	14–8	11–11
Philadelphia	10–12	7–15	15–7	11–11	6–16	—	15–7	9–13
Pittsburgh	9–13	12–10	13–9	10–12–1	8–14	7–15	—	5–17
St. Louis	9–13	4–18	13–9–1	14–8	11–11	13–9	17–5	—

=== Opening Day Lineup ===
Opening Day Lineup
#	Name	Position
29	Don Thompson	LF
6	Carl Furillo	RF
4	Duke Snider	CF
42	Jackie Robinson	2B
14	Gil Hodges	1B
39	Roy Campanella	C
1	Pee Wee Reese	SS
9	Rocky Bridges	3B
17	Carl Erskine	P

=== Notable transactions ===
- June 8, 1951: Tommy Brown was traded by the Dodgers to the Philadelphia Phillies for Dick Whitman and cash.
- June 15, 1951: Bruce Edwards, Joe Hatten, Eddie Miksis and Gene Hermanski were traded by the Dodgers to the Chicago Cubs for Johnny Schmitz, Rube Walker, Andy Pafko and Wayne Terwilliger.
- June 18, 1951: Bob Lillis was signed as an amateur free agent by the Dodgers.
- July 24, 1951: Ben Taylor was traded by the Dodgers to the St. Louis Browns for Johnny Bero, Joe Lutz and cash.
- August 31, 1951: Ross Grimsley was purchased from the Dodgers by the Chicago White Sox.

=== Roster ===
1951 Brooklyn Dodgers
Roster
Pitchers: 43 Dan Bankhead; 13 Ralph Branca; 17 Carl Erskine; 19 Joe Hatten; 20 Phil Haugstad; 23 Clyde King; 41 Clem Labine; 16 Earl Mossor; 36 Don Newcombe; 12 Erv Palica; 40 Bud Podbielan; 28 Preacher Roe; 19 Johnny Schmitz; 25 Chris Van Cuyk	Catchers: 39 Roy Campanella; 10 Bruce Edwards; 11 Mickey Livingston; 10 Rube Walker; Infielders: 9 Rocky Bridges; 3 Billy Cox; 14 Gil Hodges; 34 Eddie Miksis; 1 Pee Wee Reese; 42 Jackie Robinson; 34 Wayne Terwilliger	Outfielders: 32 Cal Abrams; 5 Tommy Brown; 6 Carl Furillo; 22 Gene Hermanski; 22 Andy Pafko; 37 Jim Russell; 4 Duke Snider; 29 Don Thompson; 38 Dick Williams; Other batters: 18 Wayne Belardi; 24 Hank Edwards	Manager: 7 Charlie Dressen; Coaches: 27 Cookie Lavagetto; 31 Jake Pitler; 15 Clyde Sukeforth

== Player stats ==
= Indicates team leader

= Indicates league leader

=== Batting ===
==== Starters by position ====
Note: Pos = Position; G = Games played; AB = At bats; H = Hits; Avg. = Batting average; HR = Home runs; RBI = Runs batted in

Pos	Player	G	AB	H	Avg.	HR	RBI
C	Roy Campanella	143	505	164	.325	33	108
1B	Gil Hodges	158	582	156	.268	40	103
2B	Jackie Robinson	153	548	185	.338	19	88
SS	Pee Wee Reese	154	616	176	.286	10	84
3B	Billy Cox	142	455	127	.279	9	51
OF	Duke Snider	150	606	168	.277	29	101
OF	Carl Furillo	158	667	197	.295	16	91
OF	Andy Pafko	84	277	69	.249	18	58

==== Other batters ====
Note: G = Games played; AB = At bats; H = Hits; Avg. = Batting average; HR = Home runs; RBI = Runs batted in

Player	G	AB	H	Avg.	HR	RBI
Cal Abrams	67	150	42	.280	3	19
Rocky Bridges	63	134	34	.254	1	15
Don Thompson	80	118	27	.229	0	6
Gene Hermanski	31	80	20	.250	1	5
Rube Walker	36	74	18	.243	2	9
Dick Williams	23	60	12	.200	1	5
Wayne Terwilliger	37	50	14	.280	0	4
Bruce Edwards	17	36	9	.250	1	8
Hank Edwards	35	31	7	.226	0	3
Tommy Brown	11	25	4	.160	0	1
Jim Russell	16	13	0	.000	0	0
Eddie Miksis	19	10	2	.200	0	0
Mickey Livingston	2	5	2	.400	0	2
Wayne Belardi	3	3	1	.333	0	0

=== Pitching ===
==== Starting pitchers ====
Note: G = Games pitched; IP = Innings pitched; W = Wins; L = Losses; ERA = Earned run average; SO = Strikeouts

Player	G	IP	W	L	ERA	SO
Don Newcombe	40	272.0	20	9	3.28	164*
Preacher Roe	34	257.2	22	3	3.04	113
Ralph Branca	42	204.0	13	12	3.26	118

- Tied with Warren Spahn (Boston) for league lead

==== Other pitchers ====
Note: G = Games pitched; IP = Innings pitched; W = Wins; L = Losses; ERA = Earned run average; SO = Strikeouts

Player	G	IP	W	L	ERA	SO
Carl Erskine	46	189.2	16	12	4.46	95
Clem Labine	14	65.1	5	1	2.20	39
Johnny Schmitz	16	55.2	1	4	5.34	20
Joe Hatten	11	49.1	1	0	4.56	22
Chris Van Cuyk	9	29.1	1	2	5.52	16

==== Relief pitchers ====
Note: G = Games pitched; W = Wins; L = Losses; SV = Saves; ERA = Earned run average; SO = Strikeouts

Player	G	W	L	SV	ERA	SO
Clyde King	48	14	7	6	4.15	33
Bud Podbielan	27	2	2	0	3.50	26
Erv Palica	19	2	6	0	4.75	15
Phil Haugstad	21	0	1	0	6.46	22
Dan Bankhead	7	0	1	0	15.43	9
Earl Mossor	3	0	0	0	32.40	1

=== Shot Heard 'Round the World ===
One of the more famous episodes in major league baseball history, and possibly one of the greatest moments in sports history, the "Shot Heard 'Round the World" is the name given to Bobby Thomson's walk-off home run that clinched the National League pennant for the New York Giants over their rivals, the Brooklyn Dodgers. This game was the third of a three-game playoff series resulting from one of baseball's most memorable pennant races. The Giants had been thirteen and a half games behind the league-leading Dodgers in August, but under Durocher's guidance and with the aid of a sixteen-game winning streak, caught the Dodgers to tie for the lead on the last day of the season. The radio broadcast of Bobby Thomson's pennant-winning home run was chronicled on a 1955 Columbia Masterworks vinyl LP record, "The Greatest Moments in Sports."

== Awards and honors ==
- National League Most Valuable Player
  - Roy Campanella
- TSN Pitcher of the Year Award
  - Preacher Roe

=== All-Stars ===
- 1951 Major League Baseball All-Star Game
  - Roy Campanella starter
  - Gil Hodges starter
  - Jackie Robinson starter
  - Don Newcombe reserve
  - Pee Wee Reese reserve
  - Preacher Roe reserve
  - Duke Snider reserve
- TSN Major League All-Star Team
  - Preacher Roe
  - Roy Campanella
  - Jackie Robinson

== Farm system ==
Level	Team	League	Manager
AAA	Montreal Royals	International League	Walter Alston
AAA	St. Paul Saints	American Association	Clay Hopper
AA	Ft. Worth Cats	Texas League	Bobby Bragan
AA	Mobile Bears	Southern Association	Paul Chervinko
A	Elmira Pioneers	Eastern League	George Fallon
A	Pueblo Dodgers	Western League	Jim Bivin
B	Asheville Tourists	Tri-State League	Ray Hathaway
B	Lancaster Red Roses	Interstate League	Ed Head
B	Miami Sun Sox	Florida International League	Pepper Martin
B	Newport News Dodgers	Piedmont League	Clay Bryant
C	Billings Mustangs	Pioneer League	Larry Shepard
C	Bisbee-Douglas Copper Kings	Southwest International League	Syd Cohen
C	Greenwood Dodgers	Cotton States League	Lou Rochelli
C	Santa Barbara Dodgers	California League	Bill Hart
D	Hazard Bombers	Mountain States League	Max Macon
D	Hornell Dodgers	Pennsylvania–Ontario–New York League	Doc Alexson
D	Ponca City Dodgers	Kansas–Oklahoma–Missouri League	George Scherger
D	Sheboygan Indians	Wisconsin State League	Joe Hauser
D	Valdosta Dodgers	Georgia–Florida League	Stan Wasiak

LEAGUE CHAMPIONS: Montreal, Santa Barbara
