= Bud Thomas =

Bud Thomas may refer to:

- Bud Thomas (pitcher) (1910–2001), Major League Baseball pitcher, played 1932–1933 and 1937–1941
- Bud Thomas (shortstop) (1929–2015), Major League Baseball shortstop, who played for the St. Louis Browns 1951
