= Ben Taylor (first baseman, born 1927) =

American baseball player (1927–1999)

- First baseman
- Born: September 30, 1927; Metropolis, Illinois, U.S.
- Died: May 11, 1999 (aged 71); Alma, Arkansas, U.S.
- Batted: Left Threw: Left

MLB debut
- July 29, 1951, for the St. Louis Browns

Last MLB appearance
- September 21, 1955, for the Milwaukee Braves

MLB statistics
- Batting average: .231
- Home runs: 3
- Runs batted in: 6
- Stats at Baseball Reference

Teams
- St. Louis Browns (1951); Detroit Tigers (1952); Milwaukee Braves (1955)

Benjamin Eugene Taylor (September 30, 1927 – May 11, 1999) was an American professional baseball first baseman whose 13-year career included 52 games played over three partial seasons with the St. Louis Browns, Detroit Tigers and Milwaukee Braves of Major League Baseball.

== Biography ==
Born in Metropolis, Illinois, Taylor threw and batted left-handed, stood 6 feet (1.8 m) tall and weighed 175 pounds (79 kg). He originally signed as a free agent in 1944 with the Brooklyn Dodgers.

In 1949, he was selected by the Chicago Cubs in the minor league draft, but was returned to the Dodgers the following year. In 1951, he was traded to the St. Louis Browns for Johnny Bero, Joe Lutz and cash, and he debuted at the major league level for the Browns that year. In his first MLB game on July 29, against the Washington Senators at Griffith Stadium, he homered off Sandy Consuegra in his second at bat. He registered 104 plate appearances for the 1951 Browns through year's end, hit two other home runs, and knocked in his only MLB runs batted in (with six RBI). He batted .258 with 24 hits.

In February of 1952, Taylor was traded with Matt Batts, Dick Littlefield and Cliff Mapes to the Detroit Tigers for Gene Bearden, Bob Cain and Dick Kryhoski. He got into only seven games for the 1952 Tigers, and spent the bulk of that campaign in the high minors; then, in October, he was traded to the Cleveland Indians for Hal Erickson. Cleveland sent Taylor to their Dallas Eagles affiliate in the Double-A Texas League in 1953, and Taylor would spend almost three full years in the Texas circuit with Dallas and the Beaumont Exporters before his recall by the Milwaukee Braves in August 1955 for his final MLB audition.

Serving mostly as a pinch hitter, he collected one hit in 12 games and ten at bats. Taylor played in the minors through 1957 before leaving baseball. All told, he collected 28 hits (with two doubles and one triple, as well as his three homers) in the majors, batting .231 in 121 career at bats.
