= Leslie, Missouri =

- Village
- Location of Leslie, Missouri
- Coordinates: 38°25′4″N 91°13′51″W
- Country: United States
- State: Missouri
- County: Franklin

Area
  - Total: 0.17 sq mi (0.44 km^{2})
  - Land: 0.17 sq mi (0.44 km^{2})
  - Water: 0 sq mi (0.00 km^{2})
- Elevation: 827 ft (252 m)

Population (2020)
  - Total: 136
  - Density: 798.5/sq mi (308.29/km^{2})
- Time zone: UTC-6 (Central (CST))
  - Summer (DST): UTC-5 (CDT)
- ZIP code: 63056
- Area code: 573
- FIPS code: 29-41690
- GNIS feature ID: 2398426

Leslie is a village in west central Franklin County, Missouri, United States. The population was about 136 at the 2020 census.

== Geography ==
Leslie is located along US Route 50 between Gerald approximately 5 miles (8.0 km) to the west and Beaufort 1.5 miles (2.4 km) to the east.

According to the United States Census Bureau, the village has a total area of 0.17 square miles (0.44 km^{2}), all land.

== Demographics ==
Historical population
Census	Pop.	Note	%±
1920	162		—
1930	103		−36.4%
1940	130		26.2%
1950	114		−12.3%
1960	104		−8.8%
1970	81		−22.1%
1980	108		33.3%
1990	134		24.1%
2000	87		−35.1%
2010	171		96.6%
2020	136		−20.5%
U.S. Decennial Census

=== 2010 census ===
At the 2010 census, there were 171 people, 50 households and 36 families living in the village. The population density was 1,005.9 per square mile (388.4/km^{2}). There were 60 housing units at an average density of 352.9 per square mile (136.3/km^{2}). The racial make-up of the village was 96.5% White, 0.6% Native American and 2.9% from two or more races. Hispanic or Latino people of any race were 2.3% of the population.

There were 50 households, of which 48.0% had children under the age of 18 living with them, 48.0% were married couples living together, 16.0% had a female householder with no husband present, 8.0% had a male householder with no wife present and 28.0% were non-families. 18.0% of all households were made up of individuals and 2% had someone living alone who was 65 years of age or older. The average household size was 3.42 and the average family size was 4.00.

The median age was 25.8 years. 37.4% of residents were under the age of 18, 11.1% were between the ages of 18 and 24, 28.7% were from 25 to 44, 18.7% were from 45 to 64 and 4.1% were 65 years of age or older. The sex make-up of the village was 48.0% male and 52.0% female.

=== 2000 census ===
At the 2000 census there were 87 people, 35 households and 19 families living in the village. The population density was 535.5 per square mile (206.8/km^{2}). There were 49 housing units at an average density of 301.6 per square mile (116.4/km^{2}). The racial make-up of the village was 100.00% White.

There were 35 households, of which 31.4% had children under the age of 18 living with them, 34.3% were married couples living together, 8.6% had a female householder with no husband present and 42.9% were non-families. 37.1% of all households were made up of individuals and 22.9% had someone living alone who was 65 years of age or older. The average household size was 2.49 and the average family size was 3.15.

29.9% of the population were under the age of 18, 11.5% from 18 to 24, 27.6% from 25 to 44, 20.7% from 45 to 64 and 10.3% who were 65 years of age or older. The median age was 36 years. For every 100 females, there were 117.5 males. For every 100 females age 18 and over, there were 103.3 males.

The median household income was $29,250 and the median family income for a family was $36,250. Males had a median income of $25,500 and females $17,917. The per capita income was $13,140. There were 15.8% of families and 12.4% of the population living below the poverty line, including no under eighteens and 22.2% of those over 64.

== Notable person ==
- Frank Saucier, Major League Baseball player
