= Homer at the Bat =

- The Simpsons episode
- The Springfield Nuclear Power Plant's softball team celebrates their final victory.
- Episode no.: Season 3 Episode 17
- Directed by: Jim Reardon
- Written by: John Swartzwelder
- Production code: 8F13
- Original air date: February 20, 1992

Guest appearances
- Marcia Wallace as Edna Krabappel (scenes deleted); Wade Boggs as himself; Jose Canseco as himself; Roger Clemens as himself; Ken Griffey Jr. as himself; Don Mattingly as himself; Steve Sax as himself; Mike Scioscia as himself; Ozzie Smith as himself; Darryl Strawberry as himself; Terry Cashman singing "Talkin' Softball"

Episode features
- Chalkboard gag: "I will not aim for the head"
- Couch gag: The family runs to the couch and bangs their heads together, knocking them unconscious. Maggie gets to the couch successfully.
- Commentary: Matt Groening; Mike Reiss; Al Jean; Jeff Martin; Dan Castellaneta; Jim Reardon

Episode chronology
← Previous "Bart the Lover"	Next → "Separate Vocations"
- The Simpsons season 3

"Homer at the Bat" is the seventeenth episode of the third season of the American animated television series The Simpsons. It originally aired on Fox in the United States on February 20, 1992. The episode follows the Springfield Nuclear Power Plant softball team, led by Homer, having a winning season and making the championship game. Mr. Burns makes a large bet that the team will win and brings in nine ringers from the "big leagues" to ensure his success.

The episode was written by John Swartzwelder and directed by Jim Reardon. Roger Clemens, Wade Boggs, Ken Griffey Jr., Steve Sax, Ozzie Smith, Jose Canseco, Don Mattingly, Darryl Strawberry, and Mike Scioscia all guest starred as themselves, playing the ringers hired by Mr. Burns. Terry Cashman sang "Talkin' Softball", a modified version of his song "Talkin' Baseball", over the end credits. "Homer at the Bat" underwent a lengthy production, as the guest stars were recorded over several months in accordance with their availability. Most of the players were accommodating except for Canseco, who demanded that his part be rewritten.

The episode is often named among the show's best, and was the first to beat The Cosby Show in the ratings on its original airing. In 2014, showrunner Al Jean selected it as one of five essential episodes in the show's history.

== Plot ==
Workers at the Springfield Nuclear Power Plant are reluctant to join the plant's softball team due to previous unsuccessful years but eagerly do so when Homer mentions he has a secret weapon, which turns out to be his "Wonder Bat," a lucky bat he made from a fallen tree branch struck by lightning. They enjoy an undefeated season and earn a spot in the championship game against the Shelbyville Nuclear Power Plant.

Mr. Burns makes a million-dollar bet with Aristotle Amadopolis, owner of the Shelbyville plant, that his team will win. To ensure victory, Burns attempts to hire nine Major League Baseball all-stars for his team from the dead-ball era such as Honus Wagner and Mordecai Brown, but after Waylon Smithers informs him that they are all retired and dead, Burns orders him to find living players. Smithers recruits Jose Canseco, Mike Scioscia, Ozzie Smith, Don Mattingly, Steve Sax, Roger Clemens, Wade Boggs, Ken Griffey Jr., and Darryl Strawberry. Mr. Burns gives them token jobs at the plant so they can play on the team, much to the dismay of the plant's players, and hires a hypnotist to boost his team's chances of winning. Homer is distraught when his Wonder Bat is destroyed by a pitch from Clemens during practice.

Before the game, seven of the nine all-star players suffer from bizarre mishaps that leave them unable to play: Sax is arrested by the Springfield police (who subsequently charge him with every unsolved murder in the city), Scioscia gets radiation poisoning as a result of working in the nuclear plant's unsafe conditions, Griffey develops gigantism due to overuse of a nerve tonic Burns has given to the team, Canseco gets caught up rescuing a woman's possessions from her burning house, Boggs gets knocked unconscious by Barney Gumble during an argument at Moe's, Smith disappears after visiting the Springfield Mystery Spot, and Clemens is hypnotized into acting like a chicken. Mattingly and Strawberry arrive at the baseball field shortly before the game starts, but Burns kicks Mattingly off the team for failing to shave off his (non-existent) sideburns. Burns is thus forced to use his team of regular employees alongside Strawberry, who plays Homer's usual position.

With the score tied, the bases loaded, and two outs in the bottom of the ninth inning, Burns calls Homer off the bench to pinch-hit for Strawberry, noting that a right handed batter against a left handed pitcher will serve to their advantage. Distracted by Burns' strange signals, Homer is hit in the head by the first pitch, knocking him out and forcing in the winning run. The team wins the title, and Homer is paraded as a hero while still unconscious. The episode ends with a picture of the team, including Smith (who is seen as a hovering spirit), Sax (in handcuffs), a still physically ailing Scioscia and Griffey, and a visibly angry Strawberry.

== Production ==
"Homer at the Bat" was long in production. It was written by John Swartzwelder, who is a big baseball fan, but was suggested by Sam Simon, who wanted an episode filled with real Major League Baseball players. Executive producers Al Jean and Mike Reiss doubted that they would be able to get nine players, thinking they would be able to get three at best. They succeeded, and the nine players who agreed to guest star were recorded over a period of six months, whenever they were playing the Los Angeles Dodgers or California Angels. Each player recorded their part in roughly five minutes and spent the next hour writing autographs for the staff. In several cases, the writers were unable to get the player who was their first choice. Nolan Ryan, Rickey Henderson, Ryne Sandberg, and Carlton Fisk were among the players who turned down the chance to guest star.

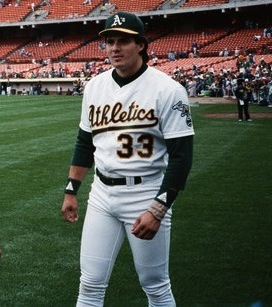
Jose Canseco disliked the original part written for him and asked for it to be rewritten.

All the players were cooperative except for Jose Canseco, whom Al Jean considered to be intimidating. He disliked his original part and insisted it be rewritten, and the writers grudgingly made him as heroic as possible. He was originally slated to wake up in bed with Edna Krabappel and miss the game (in a parody of Bull Durham), but Canseco's then-wife, Esther Haddad, objected. He disliked his caricature, saying "the animation looked nothing like [him]" but said he found the acting was very easy. When asked in 2007 about his part by the San Jose Mercury News he responded, "that was 100 years ago," hung up the phone and did not answer any of the paper's subsequent calls.

Ken Griffey Jr. became frustrated while recording his line "there's a party in my mouth and everyone's invited" because he had trouble understanding it. He was directed by Mike Reiss, and his father Ken Griffey Sr. was also present, trying to coach his son. Roger Clemens, who made his own chicken noises, was directed by Jeff Martin, as was Wade Boggs. Mike Reiss directed most of the other players. Mike Scioscia accepted his guest spot in "half a second," while Ozzie Smith has said he would like to guest star again "so [he] can get out [of the Springfield Mystery spot]". Don Mattingly, who was forced to shave off his "sideburns" by Mr. Burns during the episode, would later have an actual "haircut controversy" while he was playing for the New York Yankees. The coaching staff ordered him to cut his long hair, and he was briefly dropped from the team lineup for not doing so. As the episode continued to air in syndication, some people watching believed the joke in the episode to be a reference to the incident, but "Homer at the Bat" was recorded a year before the real-life benching happened. Many of the guest stars, including Terry Cashman, Wade Boggs and Darryl Strawberry all admit they are more well known because of their appearance in the episode, especially outside the United States, Cashman having "Talkin' Softball" requested more often than "Talkin' Baseball".

One of the hardest pieces of editing was the hypnotist segment, which featured several of the guest stars speaking in unison. It was difficult because the parts were recorded over a period of several months and thus it was hard to sync their voices. Rich Moore was originally intended to direct the episode, but as he did not know anything about baseball he was switched with Jim Reardon, who was a baseball fan. Moore was given the episode "Lisa the Greek" instead. Many of the player designs were difficult, because the animators had a hard time designing real-world people during the early seasons.

== Cultural references ==
The title is a reference to Ernest Thayer's 1888 baseball poem "Casey at the Bat". The episode makes several allusions to The Natural (1984). Homer's secret weapon, his self-created "Wonderbat", is akin to Roy Hobbs's "Wonderboy", and both bats are eventually destroyed. The scene featuring the explosion of stadium lights as Homer circles the basepaths is also taken directly from the film. The end song "Talkin' Softball" is a parody of "Talkin' Baseball" by Terry Cashman. Jeff Martin wrote the new version of the song, but Cashman was brought in to sing it. The scenes of the Power Plant team traveling from city to city by train, overlaid with the pennant of the city they are going to, is a reference to The Pride of the Yankees (1942). Carl batting with a piano leg is a reference to Norm Cash of the Detroit Tigers, who once tried to bat with a table leg in a game where Nolan Ryan was extremely overpowering and threw a no-hitter. The team name on Mr. Burns' jersey, the Zephyrs, is a reference to The Twilight Zone episode "The Mighty Casey", which features a team called the Hoboken Zephyrs. When Don Mattingly is forced off the team by Mr. Burns for "neglecting" to shave off his "sideburns," Mattingly privately states that he still preferred Burns to George Steinbrenner, the owner of the New York Yankees at the time. When Darryl Strawberry forces Homer to stay on the bench, Bart and Lisa jeer by repeatedly yelling "Darrrr-ull! Darrrr-ulll!", a taunt Strawberry was subjected to during the 1986 World Series.

== Reception ==
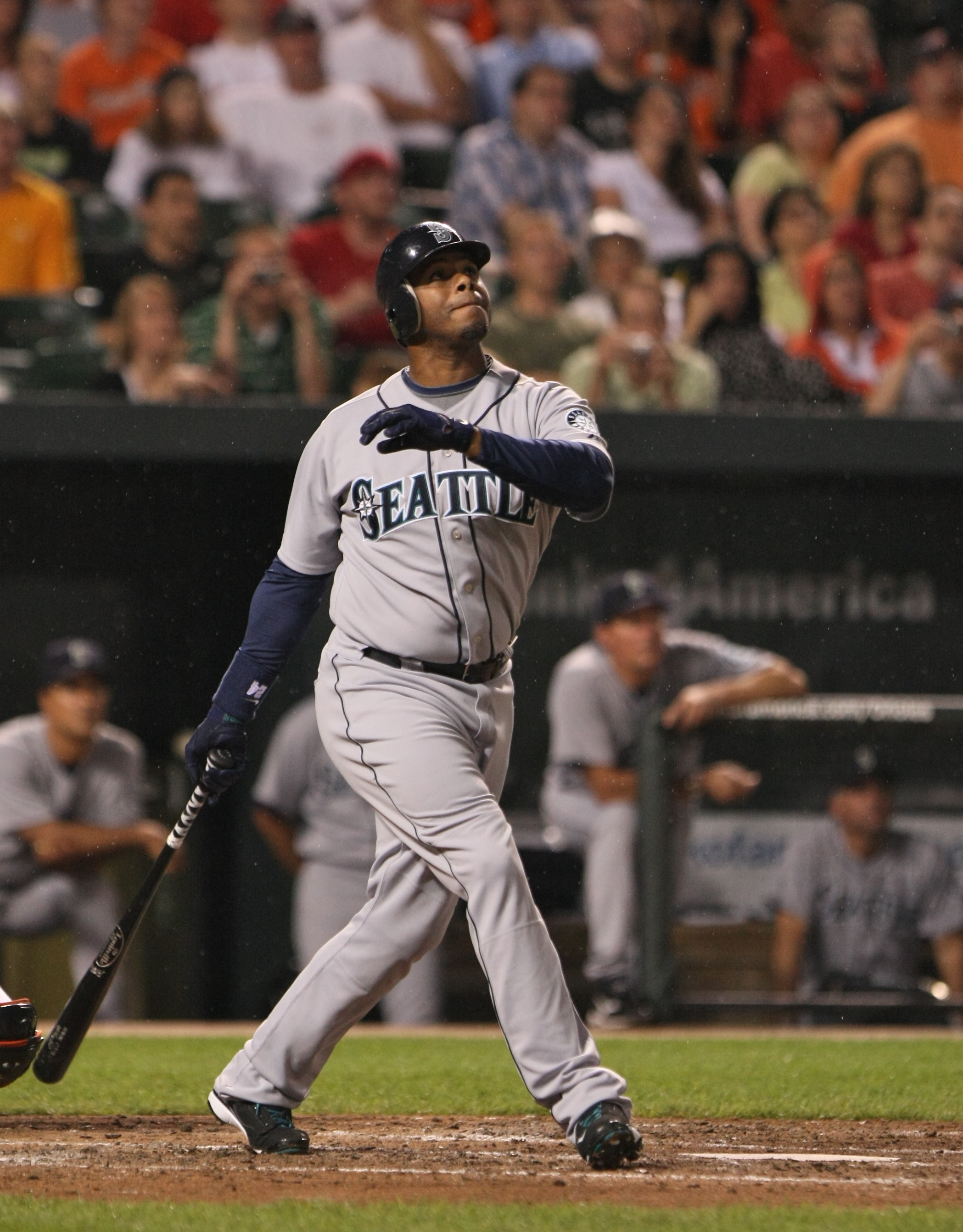
Ken Griffey Jr., the last active player to appear in the episode

During the previous season, Fox had put The Simpsons in a timeslot that meant it was in direct competition with The Cosby Show, which won the timeslot every time. "Homer at the Bat" had a 15.9 rating and 23 share to win its timeslot while The Cosby Show had a 13.2 rating and 20 share. This was the first time a new Simpsons episode beat a new Cosby Show episode. Former executive producer Sam Simon and current showrunner Al Jean named it as their favorite episode. Regular cast members Harry Shearer and Julie Kavner disliked the episode because of its focus on the guest stars and its surreal tone. They were particularly annoyed by the Mattingly sideburns joke. Writer John Swartzwelder has mentioned "Homer at the Bat" amongst seven other favorite episodes The Simpsons he wrote (out of fifty-nine) that he "always enjoys watching."

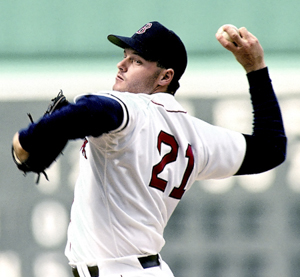
Roger Clemens, one of the nine players to guest star

Gary Russell and Gareth Roberts, the authors of the book I Can't Believe It's a Bigger and Better Updated Unofficial Simpsons Guide, praised the episode, calling it "a great episode because the accidents that befall the pro players are so funny". Chris Turner, the author of the book Planet Simpson, said the episode was the indication that "the Golden Age [of the show] had arrived". Nate Meyers rated the episode a 4 1/2 (of 5), stating "the script makes great use of the baseball superstars, giving each of them a strong personality and plenty of pep (the highlight has to be Mattingly's clash with Mr. Burns)." Colin Jacobson disliked the episode: "when ["Homer at the Bat"] originally aired, I didn't like it. While I've warmed up to the show slightly over the last decade, I still think it's generally weak, and I'd definitely pick it as Season Three's worst."

Entertainment Weekly placed the episode sixteenth on their top 25 The Simpsons episodes list, noting it was "early proof that The Simpsons could juggle a squad of guest stars without giving the family short shrift." It was placed third on AskMen.com's "Top 10: Simpsons Episodes" list, Rich Weir called it "one of the show's more memorable moments" and "effective as it combines a slew of guest stars with some hilarious material for Homer". The entire episode was placed first on ESPN.com's list of the "Top 100 Simpsons sport moments", released in 2004. Greg Collins, the author of the list, lavished praise on the episode. He said this is the "king of all sports episodes, and perhaps the greatest Simpsons episode ever". A friend of Collins later met guest star Mike Scioscia and told him he thought his guest spot was the best thing Scioscia had ever done, he responded "Thanks, I think". Entertainment.ie named it among the 10 greatest Simpsons episodes of all time. Eric Reinagel, Brian Moritz and John Hill of Press & Sun-Bulletin named the episode the fourth best in the show's history, In 2019, Time ranked the episode fifth in its list of 10 best Simpsons episodes picked by Simpsons experts. In 2019, Consequence of Sound ranked it number six on its list of top 30 Simpsons episodes.

IGN ranked the baseballers' performances as the seventeenth best guest appearance in the show's history: "each of these appearances was hilarious, making this a classic episode". The Phoenix.com praised the performances of each of the guest stars, but Darryl Strawberry, whom they put in the fifth position, was the only one to make their "Top 20 guest stars" list. The Toronto Star named Homer's conversation with Darryl Strawberry as the "greatest conversation of all time, involving the word yes".

Nathan Rabin writes that the episode is about guest stars "but it's also about expanding the show's universe into strange, surreal directions", noting the bizarre misfortunes that befall the players. "The baseball setting gives writers like John Swartzwelder free reign[sic] to indulge their love of baseball history at its most arcane, whether that means referencing 'Three Finger' Brown or having Mr. Burns give his team Brain & Nerve tonic instead of tedious old beer or Gatorade. 'Homer At The Bat' is an episode with a deep, irreverent love of baseball history. At this point, it's also part of baseball history: It's an unforgettable snapshot of what baseball royalty looked like circa 1992...the parody of 'Talkin' Baseball' that runs over the end credits has supplanted the original in my mind, perhaps because the original contains not a single reference to Ken Griffey's jaw being horrifically swollen. That it runs alongside sepia-toned, artificially aged footage of the show we just saw (a brilliant meditation on the nature of instant nostalgia that doubles as powerful instant nostalgia) is the icing on the cake, further proof that during its peak years the show went to insane lengths to get everything not just right but perfect."

== Legacy ==
The episode has been credited with helping to save at least two lives. During the scene in which Homer chokes on a donut, a poster explaining the Heimlich maneuver is on the wall behind him. In May 1992, Chris Bencze was able to save his brother's life by performing the Heimlich Maneuver on him, having seen it in the episode, and in December 2007, Aiden Bateman was able to save his friend Alex Hardy's life by recalling the same.

On October 22, 2017, Springfield of Dreams: The Legend of Homer Simpson, an hour-long mockumentary about the episode in the style of Ken Burns's Baseball, aired on Fox to commemorate the 25th anniversary of this episode as well as Homer's induction into the National Baseball Hall of Fame and Museum. Among those interviewed were every player who appeared in the episode, except for Strawberry.
