= Eddie Gaedel =

American baseball player (1925-1961)

- Gaedel batting in August 1951, in his only plate appearance in baseball
- Pinch hitter
- Born: June 8, 1925; Chicago, Illinois, U.S.
- Died: June 18, 1961 (aged 36); Chicago, Illinois, U.S.
- Batted: Right Threw: Left

MLB debut
- August 19, 1951, for the St. Louis Browns

Last MLB appearance
- August 19, 1951, for the St. Louis Browns

MLB statistics
- On-base percentage: 1.000
- Batting average: –
- Plate appearances: 1
- Base on balls: 1
- Stats at Baseball Reference

Teams
- St. Louis Browns (1951)

Career highlights and awards
- Shortest player in Major League Baseball history

Edward Carl Gaedel (June 8, 1925 – June 18, 1961) was the smallest player to appear in a Major League Baseball game.

Gaedel gained recognition in the second game of a St. Louis Browns doubleheader on August 19, 1951. Weighing 60 pounds (27 kg) and standing 3 feet 7 inches (109 cm) tall, he became the shortest player in the history of the Major Leagues. Gaedel made a single plate appearance and was walked with four consecutive balls before being replaced by a pinch-runner at first base. His jersey, bearing the uniform number "1/8", is displayed in the St. Louis Cardinals Baseball Hall of Fame and Museum.

St. Louis Browns owner Bill Veeck, in his 1962 autobiography Veeck – As in Wreck, said of Gaedel, "He was, by golly, the best darn midget who ever played big-league ball. He was also the only one."

== Early life ==
Edward Carl Gaedele (Gaedel) was born in Cook County, Illinois, on June 8, 1925. His father, Carl Gaedele (1886–1949), was a Lithuanian immigrant who managed a department store and worked as a parking lot checker. His mother, Helen (née Janicki), was a homemaker. In 1930, the Gaedele family lived in Chicago's Garfield Ridge neighborhood, and by 1940, the family lived in Back of the Yards.

== Appearance ==
Gaedel had worked as a riveter during World War II, as he was able to crawl inside the wings of airplanes. He was a professional performer, belonging to the American Guild of Variety Artists (AGVA). After the war, Gaedel was hired in 1946 by Mercury Records as a mascot to portray the "Mercury Man". He sported a winged hat similar to the record label's logo, to promote Mercury recordings. Some early Mercury recordings featured a caricature of him as its logo.

Browns' owner Bill Veeck, a showman who enjoyed staging publicity stunts, found Gaedel through a booking agency. Secretly signed by the Browns, he was added to the team roster and put in uniform (with the number "1/8" on the back). The uniform was that of future St. Louis Cardinals managing partner and chairman William DeWitt, Jr. who was a 9-year-old batboy for the Browns at the time.

Gaedel came out of a papier-mache cake between games of a doubleheader at Sportsman's Park in St. Louis to celebrate the American League's 50th anniversary. The stunt was also billed as a Falstaff Brewery promotion. Falstaff, and the fans, had been promised a "festival of surprises" by Veeck. Before the second game got underway, the press agreed that the "midget-in-a-cake" appearance had not been up to Veeck's usual promotional standard. Falstaff personnel, who had been promised national publicity for their participation, were particularly dissatisfied. Keeping the surprise he had in store for the second game to himself, Veeck just meekly apologized.

Although Veeck denied the stunt was directly inspired by it, the appearance of Gaedel was similar to the plot of "You Could Look It Up", a 1941 short story by James Thurber. Veeck later said he got the idea from listening to the conversations of Giants manager John McGraw decades earlier when Veeck was a child.

=== At the plate ===
On August 19, 1951, Gaedel entered the second half of the doubleheader between the Browns and Detroit Tigers in the bottom of the first inning as a pinch-hitter for leadoff batter Frank Saucier. Immediately, umpire Ed Hurley called for Browns manager Zack Taylor. Veeck and Taylor had the foresight to have a copy of Gaedel's contract on hand, as well as a copy of the Browns' active roster, which had room for Gaedel's addition.

The contract had been filed late in the day on Friday, August 17. Veeck knew the league office would summarily approve the contract upon receipt, and that it would not be scrutinized until Monday, August 20. Upon reading the contract, Hurley motioned for Gaedel to take his place in the batter's box (as a result of Gaedel's appearance, all contracts must now be approved by the Commissioner of Baseball before a player can appear in a game). The change to that day's St. Louis Browns scorecard, listing Gaedel and his uniform number, had gone unnoticed by everyone except Harry Mitauer, a writer for the St. Louis Globe-Democrat. The Browns' publicity man shunted Mitauer's inquiry aside. Until Gaedel stepped up to the plate, even his teammates had no idea he was actually going to play in the game.

Gaedel was under strict orders not to attempt to move the bat off his shoulder. When Veeck got the impression that Gaedel might be tempted to swing at a pitch, he warned Gaedel that he had taken out a $1 million insurance policy on his life, and that he would be standing on the roof of the stadium with a rifle prepared to kill Gaedel if he even looked like he was going to swing. Veeck had carefully trained Gaedel to assume a tight crouch at the plate; he had measured Gaedel's strike zone in that stance and claimed it was just one and a half inches (3.8 cm) high. However, when Gaedel came to the plate, he abandoned the crouch he had been taught for a pose that Veeck described as "a fair approximation of Joe DiMaggio's classic style", leading Veeck to fear he was going to swing.

With Bob Cain (listed as six feet tall, 29 inches taller than Gaedel) on the mound—laughing at the absurdity that he actually had to pitch to Gaedel—and catcher Bob Swift catching on his knees, Gaedel took his stance. The Tigers catcher offered his pitcher a piece of strategy: "Keep it low". Cain delivered four consecutive balls, all high (the first two pitches were legitimate attempts at strikes; the last two were half-speed tosses). Gaedel took his base (stopping twice during his trot to bow to the crowd) and was replaced by pinch-runner Jim Delsing. The 18,369 fans gave Gaedel a standing ovation.

=== Baseball reaction ===
Veeck had hoped that Delsing would go on to score in a one-run Browns victory, but he ended up stranded at third base and the Tigers won the game 6–2. American League president Will Harridge, saying Veeck was making a mockery of the game, voided Gaedel's contract the next day. In response, Veeck threatened to request an official ruling on whether Yankees shortstop and reigning American League MVP Phil Rizzuto, who stood 5 feet 6 inches (1.68 m), was a short ballplayer or a tall dwarf.

Initially, Major League Baseball struck Gaedel from its record book, as if he had not been in the game. He was relisted a year later, as a right-handed batter and left-handed thrower (although he did not play the field). Eddie Gaedel finished his major league career with an on-base percentage of 1.000. His total earnings as a pro athlete were $100 (equivalent to $1,200 in 2025), the scale price for an American Guild of Variety Artists appearance.

== Later life ==
Gaedel's major league career lasted just the one plate appearance, but with Veeck's 1959 acquisition of the White Sox he began working for Veeck in other capacities. On May 26, 1959, a helicopter carrying Gaedel and three other dwarfs dressed as spacemen "invaded" Comiskey Park, its apparent mission being the delivery of "ray guns" to two of the White Sox' smallest players, Nellie Fox and Luis Aparicio, to whom Gaedel reportedly confided, "I don't want to be taken to your leader. I've already met him." On April 19, 1961, Veeck hired several dwarfs, including Gaedel, as vendors, allegedly due to "some complaints" from fans regarding hitherto blocked sight lines.

=== Death ===
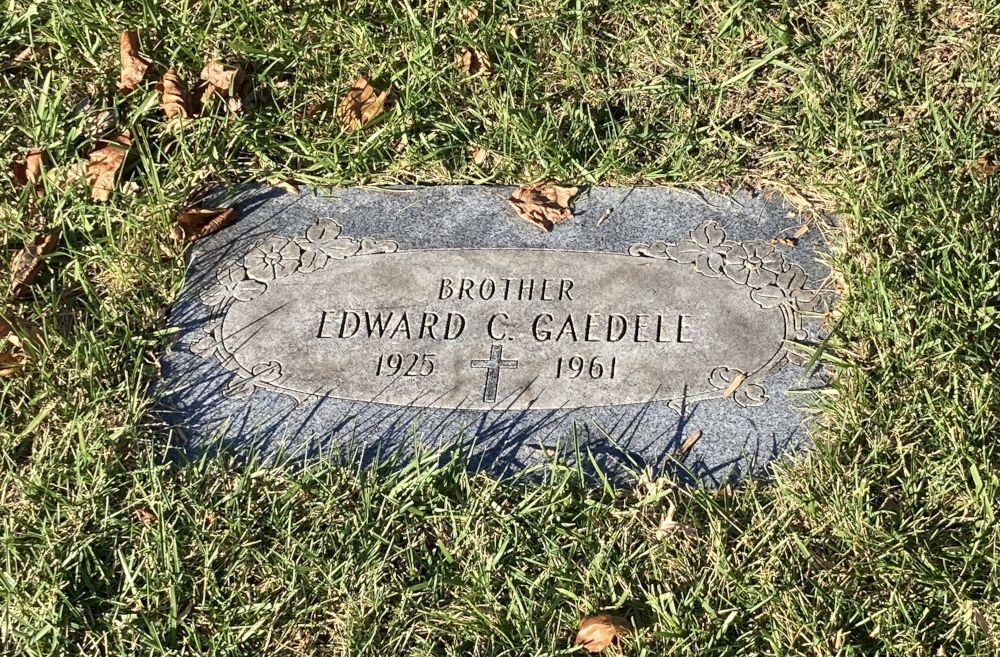
Gaedel's grave at Saint Mary Catholic Cemetery

On June 18, 1961, the unemployed Gaedel, who had just turned 36, was at a bowling alley in Chicago, his birthplace and hometown. Gaedel was followed home and beaten. His mother discovered him lying dead in his bed. He had bruises about his knees and on the left side of his face. A coroner's inquest determined that he also had a heart attack. Bob Cain, who had pitched to Gaedel, was the only Major League Baseball figure to attend the funeral, despite the fact that the two never formally met. Gaedel was interred at Saint Mary Catholic Cemetery and Mausoleum in Cook County, Illinois. His tombstone indicates that his family name may actually have been Gaedele, not Gaedel.

== Legacy ==
Gaedel is one of only five Major League players who drew a walk in their only plate appearance and never played the field. The first three all played in the 1910s: Dutch Schirick (September 17, 1914 with the Browns), Bill Batsch (September 9, 1916 with Pittsburgh) and – in a disputed case – Joe Cobb (April 25, 1918 with Detroit; recent research shows that Cobb is more likely to have struck out in his only plate appearance). On June 24, 2007, Kevin Melillo of the Oakland Athletics did so against the New York Mets. Other than Gaedel, the other four players pinch-hit for pitchers; all five appeared in games their teams ultimately lost. For Gaedel, Schirick and Batsch, their one MLB appearance was their only professional appearance in organized baseball at any level.

Gaedel's one-day career has been the subject of programs on ESPN and MLB Network. He was mentioned by name in the lyrics of Terry Cashman's homage to 1950s baseball, "Talkin' Baseball (Willie, Mickey, and the Duke)." His at-bat was the No. 1 choice on a 1999 list of "Unusual and Unforgettable Moments" in baseball history published by the Sporting News.

In 1994, Veeck's son Mike Veeck owned the minor league St. Paul Saints team. He brought the then 69-year-old Bob Cain to the park to "reenact" the at-bat, by pitching to the 10-year-old son of the Saints manager.

Because of its scarcity, Gaedel's autograph now sells for more than Babe Ruth's.

Gaedel's grandnephew, Kyle Gaedele, was selected in the 2011 MLB draft by the San Diego Padres and played minor league baseball as high as the Double-A level.

== See also ==
- List of baseball players who went directly to Major League Baseball
