= Talkin' Baseball =

1981 baseball themed song by Terry Cashman

"Talkin' Baseball (Willie, Mickey & The Duke)" is a 1981 song written and performed by Terry Cashman. The song describes the history of American major league baseball from the 1950s to the beginning of the 1980s. The song was originally released during the 1981 Major League Baseball strike, and was inspired by a picture of the three outfielders of the title (Willie Mays, Mickey Mantle, and Duke Snider) together. (Others are also in the photograph, but were left out of the song and airbrushed from the record's picture sleeve.) The original sheet music for the song is a part of the Cooperstown Collection, and Cashman was honored at the 2011 Hall Of Fame weekend.

Each version begins with a synthesizer version of the first ten notes of the song "Take me Out to the Ballgame", before the singing starts. Each version ends on a fade.

A parody of the song, entitled "Talkin' Softball", also sung by Cashman, appeared in the 1992 episode of The Simpsons ("Homer at the Bat"). It can also be found on the 1999 CD compilation Go Simpsonic With the Simpsons.

Talkin' Baseball closes out the It's Always Sunny in Philadelphia episode "The Gang Beats Boggs", and would also feature in a later follow-up episode, "The Gang Beats Boggs: Ladies Reboot".

== References in song ==
=== Direct player references ===
The song's refrain of "Willie, Mickey and the Duke" refers to Willie Mays, Mickey Mantle, and Duke Snider, three Hall-of-Fame center fielders, all of whom played in the same city at the same time—Mays for the New York Giants, Mantle for the New York Yankees and Snider for the Brooklyn Dodgers. Other players and managers are referred to in the song, some by full name, some partial name, and some by nicknames. Those mentioned, in order, are:

- Bobby Thomson
- Yogi Berra
- Ted Kluszewski
- Roy Campanella
- Stan Musial (The Man)
- Bob Feller
- Phil Rizzuto (The Scooter)
- Sal Maglie (The Barber)
- Don Newcombe (The Newk)
- Casey Stengel
- Henry Aaron
- Jackie Robinson (One Robbie going out)
- Frank Robinson or Brooks Robinson (One Robbie...coming in)
- Ralph Kiner
- Eddie Gaedel (Midget Gaedel)
- Ted Williams (The Thumper)
- Mel Parnell
- George Brett
- Bobby Bonds
- Pete Rose
- Rusty Staub
- Grover Cleveland Alexander (reference to Ronald Reagan, who played Alexander in the 1952 film The Winning Team)
- Reggie Jackson
- Dan Quisenberry
- Rod Carew
- Gaylord Perry
- Tom Seaver
- Steve Garvey
- Mike Schmidt
- Vida Blue

"The Bachelor" and "Cookie" mentioned in the song's bridge are not baseball figures, but childhood friends of Cashman's: Mike Green and Bobby Cook.

=== Other references ===
Explanations of some other references in the song:

- "The Whiz Kids": a nickname for the Philadelphia Phillies in the early 1950s, especially their 1950 pennant winner.
- "Bobby Thomson had done it": In 1951, Thomson hit what became known as the Shot Heard 'Round the World to win a playoff between his team, the New York Giants, and the Brooklyn Dodgers, their arch-rival.
- "Yogi read the comics...": Yogi Berra was known for enjoying comic books.
- "Marijuana, we would scorn": The Boggs Act was signed into law in 1952. It called for a minimum sentence of 2-10 years for cannabis possession.
- "The national pastime went on trial": Baseball has been called the national pastime since the 1800s. In the 1950s, there were attempts to overturn baseball's exemption from anti-trust laws, especially in Toolson v. New York Yankees.
- "Well, Casey was winning...": Casey Stengel was the manager of the perennially great New York Yankees from 1949 until 1960, during which time they won the World Series seven times.
- "Midget Gaedel": In 1951, St. Louis Browns owner Bill Veeck hired Gaedel for a one-day stunt, sending the 3-foot, 7-inch Eddie Gaedel up to the plate as a pinch-hitter.
- "And Ike was the only one winning down in Washington" refers to U.S. President Dwight Eisenhower. The Washington Senators baseball club was a perennially losing team.
- "The Oklahoma Kid": This refers to Mantle, who was from Oklahoma.
- "Bobby Bonds can play for everyone": Bonds played for eight teams in his career, and by 1981 had played for all eight of those teams within eight seasons.
- "Rose is at the Vet": After spending 16 years with the Cincinnati Reds in 1978 Pete Rose joined the Philadelphia Phillies, who at the time played at Veterans Stadium.
- "Rusty again is a Met": Staub had been traded away by the New York Mets following the 1975 season but returned in 1981.
- "And the great Alexander is pitchin' again in Washington" is actually a double reference--to Grover Cleveland Alexander and to U.S. President Ronald Reagan. When the song was released, Reagan had recently assumed the presidency; the line refers to the fact that in his former career as a film actor Reagan had portrayed Alexander in the movie The Winning Team.
- "If Cooperstown is calling, it's no fluke": The Baseball Hall of Fame is sometimes referred to metonymically as "Cooperstown", as it is located in the town of Cooperstown, New York. As of 2022, only five of the players mentioned in this verse have been elected to the Hall of Fame. Jackson, Seaver, Carew, Perry, and Schmidt made it; Quisenberry, Garvey and Blue have not.
- "Say hey": Used in the final chorus, Willie Mays was known as "The Say Hey Kid."
- The refrain of the first two verses includes the line "They knew 'em all from Boston to Dubuque". In the baseball-themed movie Field of Dreams, released eight years after this song, the Field was (and still is) located outside of Dyersville, Iowa, approximately 25 miles west of Dubuque, Iowa.

== Later versions ==
The song quickly gained popularity among baseball fans, and soon Cashman began recording alternate versions of the song, each focusing on a single major-league team. In some cases, the team-specific versions have been rewritten and updated over time.

== Chart performance ==
Chart (1981)	Peak position
U.S. Billboard Easy Listening	28
