= Cliff Mapes =

American baseball player (1922–1996)

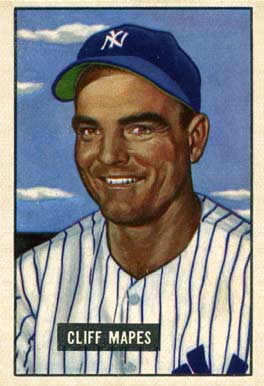
- Outfielder
- Born: March 13, 1922; Sutherland, Nebraska, U.S.
- Died: December 5, 1996 (aged 74); Pryor, Oklahoma, U.S.
- Batted: Left Threw: Right

MLB debut
- April 20, 1948, for the New York Yankees

Last MLB appearance
- September 28, 1952, for the Detroit Tigers

MLB statistics
- Batting average: .242
- Home runs: 38
- Runs batted in: 172
- Stats at Baseball Reference

Teams
- New York Yankees (1948–1951); St. Louis Browns (1951); Detroit Tigers (1952)

Career highlights and awards
- 2× World Series champion (1949, 1950)

Clifford Franklin Mapes (March 13, 1922 – December 5, 1996) was an American professional baseball player. He played five seasons of Major League Baseball as an outfielder for the New York Yankees, St. Louis Browns and Detroit Tigers.

== Professional career ==
Mapes, who was listed with a height of 6 ft 3 in (1.91 m), and a weight of 205 lb (93 kg), was originally signed as an amateur free agent by the Cleveland Indians prior to the 1940 season. He never played for the Indians, and was later drafted by the New York Yankees in the 1946 Rule 5 draft. After a season in the minors, Mapes was recalled to the Major League level, where he saw limited time as a backup to an outfield that contained Joe DiMaggio, Tommy Henrich, and Johnny Lindell. Mapes hit .250, with 12 runs batted in, and his first career home run.

In his second season, Mapes saw regular time as a starter. He hit .247 with seven home runs and 38 runs batted in, but also led the team in strikeouts in helping the Yankees claim the American League pennant. He was the team's starting right fielder against the Brooklyn Dodgers, and he helped the team win the 1949 World Series, the team's first World Series en route to five consecutive world championships.

In 1950, Mapes led the team in strikeouts for the second consecutive season. His playing time remained the same, but his power numbers improved from a year earlier. Mapes hit batted .247 with 12 home runs and 61 runs batted in, but also grounded into a team-high 14 double plays. The Yankees finished the season with the American League pennant once again, but Mapes saw little time in the postseason; Mapes only appeared in one game as the Yankees won the 1950 World Series in a four-game sweep of the Philadelphia Phillies.

As Mapes' numbers started to decrease in 1951, including a batting average which fell to .216, the Yankees decided to cut ties with him. He was purchased by the St. Louis Browns on July 31, 1951. After a moderate season with the Browns, he was traded with Matt Batts, Dick Littlefield, and Ben Taylor to the Detroit Tigers for Gene Bearden, Bob Cain, and Dick Kryhoski. In 1952, for the Tigers, Mapes hit a career-low .197, and was traded back to the Browns, with Neil Berry and cash, for Jake Crawford. However, Mapes decided to end his professional baseball career, having played his final game on September 28, 1952.

Mapes wore number 3 for the Yankees until that number was retired in honor of Babe Ruth. Mapes then wore number 13 before switching to number 7. When Mapes was traded by the Yankees in 1951, Mickey Mantle took uniform number 7. Mapes, thus, is mainly remembered as the Yankee who wore both Babe Ruth's and Mickey Mantle's numbers.

On December 5, 1996, Mapes died in Pryor, Oklahoma, at the age of 74.
