= Gene Bearden =

American baseball player (1920–2004)

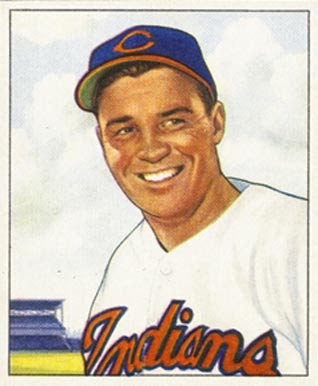
- Pitcher
- Born: September 5, 1920; Lexa, Arkansas, U.S.
- Died: March 18, 2004 (aged 83); Alexander City, Alabama, U.S.
- Batted: Left Threw: Left

MLB debut
- May 10, 1947, for the Cleveland Indians

Last MLB appearance
- September 5, 1953, for the Chicago White Sox

MLB statistics
- Win–loss record: 45–38
- Earned run average: 3.96
- Strikeouts: 259
- Stats at Baseball Reference

Teams
- Cleveland Indians (1947–1950); Washington Senators (1950–1951); Detroit Tigers (1951); St. Louis Browns (1952); Chicago White Sox (1953)

Career highlights and awards
- World Series champion (1948); AL ERA leader (1948)

Henry Eugene Bearden (September 5, 1920 – March 18, 2004) was an American professional baseball player. A left-handed pitcher, he played in Major League Baseball (MLB) from 1947 to 1953 for the Cleveland Indians, Washington Senators, Detroit Tigers, St. Louis Browns and Chicago White Sox. In 193 career games, Bearden pitched 788 1/3 innings and posted a win–loss record of 45–38, with 29 complete games, seven shutouts, 259 strikeouts, and a 3.96 earned run average (ERA).

Born in Lexa, Arkansas, Bearden was signed to a contract by the Philadelphia Phillies out of high school, and spent four seasons in the minor leagues. He then served in the United States Navy during World War II aboard the USS Helena. He was wounded during the Battle of Kula Gulf and was hospitalized until 1945 when he made a return to baseball. After two years in the New York Yankees organization, Bearden was traded to the Cleveland Indians and made his MLB debut in 1947, making one appearance that year.

The following year, he won 20 games as a rookie, finishing second in Rookie of the Year voting, and led the Indians to the American League pennant and World Series championship. His success did not last, and within two years he was released. He then spent time with the Washington Senators, Detroit Tigers, St. Louis Browns, and Chicago White Sox between 1950 and 1953, appearing as both a starting pitcher and relief pitcher. After his last MLB appearance, he spent four more years in the minor leagues before retiring. He lived in Helena, Arkansas, after retiring, working for KFFA and engaging in a number of business ventures until his death in 2004.

== Early life and military service ==
Bearden was born in Lexa, Arkansas. His father worked for the Missouri Pacific Railroad, and moved the family to Tennessee, where he graduated from Memphis Technical High School. He was signed by the Philadelphia Phillies in 1939, and began his professional career with the Class D Moultrie Packers, winning five games and losing 11. In 1940 and 1941, Bearden played for the Miami Beach Flamingos of the Florida East Coast League. He won 18 games with a 1.71 ERA in 1940 and won 17 games with a 2.40 ERA in 1941. He split the 1942 season between the Savannah Indians and Augusta Tigers of the South Atlantic League. After the season ended, Bearden joined the United States Navy to serve in World War II.

Originally serving at a blimp station in New Jersey, Bearden said that he was assigned to serve aboard the USS Helena in the Pacific Theater of Operations. During the Battle of Kula Gulf on July 6, 1943, he was working in the engine room of the light cruiser when it was struck by three Japanese torpedoes. Forced to abandon ship as the Helena sank, Bearden fell from a ladder on the deck and sustained a fractured skull and a crushed kneecap. Hospitalized until early 1945, he underwent surgeries that inserted metal plates in his head and knee to treat his injuries. In a 1949 autobiographical article published in The Sporting News' Official Baseball Register, Bearden declined to discuss his wartime experience, saying: "I was just another gob [slang for sailor], luckier than many, because I met up with a doctor who is, to me, the best orthopedic surgeon in the business." Although the Helena story was repeated throughout his lifetime, it was not true. He was in the Navy, but serving in Florida during the relevant time period. Copies of his Naval service records do not support the Helena story.

Bearden returned to baseball in 1945 as a part of the New York Yankees organization and won 15 games in the Class A Binghamton Triplets of the Eastern League. Promoted to the Triple-A Oakland Oaks in 1946, he finished the season with a 15–4 record and a 3.13 ERA. While in Oakland, he learned to throw the knuckleball under manager Casey Stengel. He would become primarily a knuckleball pitcher in the major leagues as a result, with that encompassing 80% of his pitches. On December 6, 1946, the New York Yankees, traded him to the Cleveland Indians along with Hal Peck and Al Gettel for Sherm Lollar and Ray Mack. Indians owner Bill Veeck had originally wanted Spec Shea in the trade and was turned down by the Yankees, but after talking with Stengel about Oakland's pitchers, he requested Bearden instead at Stengel's suggestion, and the trade was accepted.

== Cleveland Indians ==
After spring training, Bearden was named to the major league roster to start the 1947 Cleveland Indians season. He made his debut on May 10, where he allowed three runs in 1/3 innings against the St. Louis Browns. After the game, he was demoted to the Triple-A Baltimore Orioles of the International League. He quit the team after two defeats, not wanting to pitch in International League ballparks as he found them too small. He refused to return to baseball until Bill Veeck agreed to loan Bearden back to the Oakland Oaks. He spent the rest of 1947 with the Oaks. Reunited with Casey Stengel, he finished the season with a 16–7 record, and a 2.86 ERA in 198 innings pitched.

Bearden earned a place on the roster out of spring training, and remained on the team throughout the 1948 Cleveland Indians season. His first appearance was on May 8 against the Washington Senators. He won six of his first seven starting assignments, with four complete games and two shutouts on May 22 and June 8, both against the Boston Red Sox. By September 1, Bearden had a 13–6 won-loss record with an earned run average of 2.74, and manager Lou Boudreau had shifted to a four-man rotation into the final month, which would given Bearden more starts. Bearden lost his first September start on the sixth against the Chicago White Sox, then won his next seven starts. With Bearden pitching complete game shutouts against the White Sox on September 28 and Detroit Tigers on October 2, the Indians and Red Sox finished the season on Sunday, October 3, in a tie for the league championship.

For the one-game playoff, set for Fenway Park on Monday, October 4, Indians player-manager Lou Boudreau went with Bearden as his starting pitcher, after having the team vote on who should start. On only one day of rest, Bearden pitched another complete game, shutting down the Red Sox on five hits and one earned run. Cleveland won, 8–3, behind Boudreau's four hits and two home runs. The win gave Bearden 20 victories against seven defeats and a 2.47 ERA, which led the American League. On October 8, in Game 3 of the 1948 World Series against the National League's Boston Braves, he threw a complete game, five-hit shutout, defeating the Braves 2–0; he also hit a double and scored a run. Then, in Game 6 on October 11, he preserved the Indians' Series-clinching win for starter Bob Lemon. He allowed two inherited runners to score in the eighth inning, but allowed no runs to score in the ninth, earning the save and giving the Indians the 4–3 victory to become world champions. Bearden finished the season, in addition to his ERA title, in second place for wins with 20, second in shutouts with six, and an eighth-place finish in the American League Most Valuable Player Award balloting. He also finished second in Rookie of the Year voting to Alvin Dark, shortstop of the Braves.

During the offseason, Bearden went to Hollywood and appeared as himself in two movies, The Stratton Story and The Kid From Cleveland. Bearden remained in the starting rotation for 1949 and pitched in the home opener against the Detroit Tigers, but his knuckleball was figured out by opposing managers. Casey Stengel, now manager of the Yankees, had told his players to avoid swinging at it, as his knuckleball rarely landed in the strike zone. This, combined with a pinched sciatic nerve in his leg, led to shaky results. In his first matchup against the Yankees in 1949, he allowed 16 hits and four runs in a 4–3 loss. By July, after failing to throw a complete game in June, he was moved to the bullpen, where he spent the rest of the season. Bearden finished 1949 with an 8–8 record and a 5.10 ERA, and he led the AL in wild pitches with 11.

== Later life and career ==
Bearden was relegated to relief pitcher duty in 1950 and, after a 6.15 ERA in 14 appearances, the Indians placed him on waivers. The Washington Senators acquired him on August 2 for $10,000, beating out the Tigers and Yankees, who had also tried to acquire him; he had hopes of bouncing back as he felt his 1949 performance was the result of a nagging leg injury that occurred after three starts and lasted throughout the season. Bearden pitched in 12 games for the Senators, finishing the season with a 3–5 record and a 4.21 ERA. This included an August 22 matchup against the Indians, a 5–1 loss, where he requested to start to "personally knock the Indians out of the pennant race." Bearden had a poor performance in spring training, and after pitching one game for the Senators in April, the team released him. He was picked up on waivers by the Detroit Tigers, who were looking to add a left-handed relief pitcher. He spent the season with the Tigers, finishing the year with a 3–4 record, a 4.33 ERA, in 37 appearances with the team. On February 14, 1952, the Tigers traded Bob Cain, Dick Kryhoski, and Bearden to the St. Louis Browns for Matt Batts, Dick Littlefield, Cliff Mapes and Ben Taylor.

Bearden spent the full 1952 season with the Browns, and split time as a starter and reliever. In 34 games pitched, 16 of them starts, Bearden had a 7–8 record, a 4.30 ERA, and 10 wild pitches, which led the American League. However, his hitting improved that year; despite a career batting average of .202 entering the season, he finished the year with a .354 average in 65 at bats, which made him the best hitting pitcher that season. During the offseason, Bearden led a barnstorming tour, where he and other major league players faced the Memphis Red Sox of the Negro American League in a series of exhibition matches. In March 1953, the Browns released Bearden, and the Chicago White Sox acquired him off waivers. In 25 games for the White Sox, he had a 3–3 record and a 2.95 ERA. After the season ended, the White Sox traded Bearden to the Seattle Rainiers of the Pacific Coast League for Art Del Duca and Alex Garbowski.

Bearden pitched in 44 games for the Rainiers in 1954, finishing the season with a record of 11–13 and a 4.05 ERA. The following year, he was traded to the San Francisco Seals for Elmer Singleton. In the first half of the season, he had ten wins and one loss, which led the Pacific Coast League at the time. He finished the season with a record of 18–12 and a 3.52 ERA in 43 games. In 1956, he played for the Sacramento Solons, and finished the year with a 15–14 win–loss record and a 3.48 ERA in 34 games. During the offseason, he pitched for Cienfuegos of the Cuban League, pitching in 14 games for them and participating in the 1956 Caribbean Series, which the team won. After starting the 1957 season with Sacramento and pitching in four games, Bearden was sent to the Minneapolis Millers of the American Association, where he finished the year with a 5–6 record and a 5.30 ERA in 34 games. After the season, Bearden requested to rejoin Sacramento as a player-coach, after originally requesting a trade from Sacramento one year prior. Shortly afterward, Bearden was named radio station manager of KFFA in Helena, Arkansas, formally ending his baseball career.

While he was active, for off-season employment he worked in the motion picture industry as both an extra and backstage crew member. After retiring from baseball, Bearden lived in Helena with his wife, Lois, and his children. He was involved in a number of business ventures in Helena, including owning a restaurant and working as general manager for Plaza Auto Sales, and was also a youth baseball coach. Bearden died in 2004 in Alexander City, Alabama, at 83 years of age.

== See also ==
- List of Major League Baseball annual ERA leaders
