= Wayne McLeland =

American baseball player (1924–2004)

- Pitcher
- Born: August 29, 1924; Stockport, Iowa, U.S.
- Died: May 9, 2004 (aged 79); Houston, Texas, U.S.
- Batted: Right Threw: Right

MLB debut
- April 20, 1951, for the Detroit Tigers

Last MLB appearance
- May 10, 1952, for the Detroit Tigers

MLB statistics
- Win–loss record: 0–1
- Earned run average: 8.56
- Innings pitched: 13 2/3
- Stats at Baseball Reference

Teams
- Detroit Tigers (1951–1952)

Wayne Gaffney McLeland (August 29, 1924 – May 9, 2004) was an American professional baseball player, a right-handed pitcher whose 11-year (1942; 1946–1955) pro career included ten games played in Major League Baseball for the 1951–1952 Detroit Tigers. Born in Stockport, Iowa, and nicknamed "Nubbin", he stood 6 feet (1.8 m) tall and weighed 180 pounds (82 kg). McLeland was a veteran of the United States Army, serving during World War II.

Originally signed by the St. Louis Cardinals after his 1940 graduation from Stockport High School, McLeland was named the 1950 "pitcher of the year" in the Double-A Texas League, as he won 21 of 29 decisions and compiled an earned run average of 2.49 in 267 innings pitched for the unaffiliated Dallas Eagles franchise. He was acquired by the Tigers after that season and spent most of the 1951 and 1952 campaigns at the Triple-A level of minor league baseball, with three brief trials with the Tigers. In his only starting role in MLB, against the Chicago White Sox on September 9, 1951, he allowed four earned runs in 4 2/3 innings and took the loss in a 4–3 defeat. White Sox first baseman Eddie Robinson drove in three runs with a home run and a double, to do most of the damage against McLeland that day.

During his brief Major League service, McLeland allowed 24 hits, 13 runs (all earned), and ten bases on balls in 13 2/3 total innings of work; he failed to record a strikeout. He settled in Houston, Texas, after his baseball career ended and spent 35 years working for the Goodyear Tire and Rubber Company.
