= Don Thompson (baseball) =

American baseball player (1923–2009)

- Outfielder
- Born: December 28, 1923; Swepsonville, North Carolina, U.S.
- Died: September 28, 2009 (aged 85); Asheville, North Carolina, U.S.
- Batted: Left Threw: Left

MLB debut
- April 24, 1949, for the Boston Braves

Last MLB appearance
- June 22, 1954, for the Brooklyn Dodgers

MLB statistics
- Batting average: .218
- Home runs: 1
- Runs scored: 52
- Stats at Baseball Reference

Teams
- Boston Braves (1949); Brooklyn Dodgers (1951, 1953–1954)

Donald Newlin Thompson (December 28, 1923 – September 28, 2009) was an American Major League Baseball player. He was an outfielder for the Boston Braves and Brooklyn Dodgers from 1949 to 1954.

== Baseball career ==
Thompson was born in Swepsonville, North Carolina. In 1943, he signed with the Boston Red Sox organization as a pitcher. He pitched in the minor leagues for a few years but then hurt his arm. He converted into an outfielder, and in 1947 he hit .328 for the Class D Milford Red Sox.

Thompson made his Major League debut in 1949 for the Braves. After the season, he was traded to the Dodgers and spent 1950 with their top minor league club, the International League's Montreal Royals. He led the Royals in all three triple crown categories and was promoted to the Major League team in 1951. As a backup outfielder in 1951, Thompson hit just .229. He had the lowest batting average and OPS of any Dodger player with over 100 at-bats, and Brooklyn lost the pennant by one game.

In 1952, Thompson returned to Montreal and batted .345. He was Brooklyn's left fielder in 1953. His career highlight came in game 4 of that year's World Series, when he threw out the New York Yankees' Billy Martin at home plate to end the game. In 1954, Thompson hit just .040 in 34 games and was again sent down to Montreal. He retired after the season.

== Later life ==
Thompson went into the automobile business after his baseball days were over and later became a real estate agent. He was elected into the Brooklyn Dodgers Hall of Fame in 1997.

Thompson died in 2009, at the age of 85.
