= Bill Jennings (baseball) =

American baseball player (1925-2010)

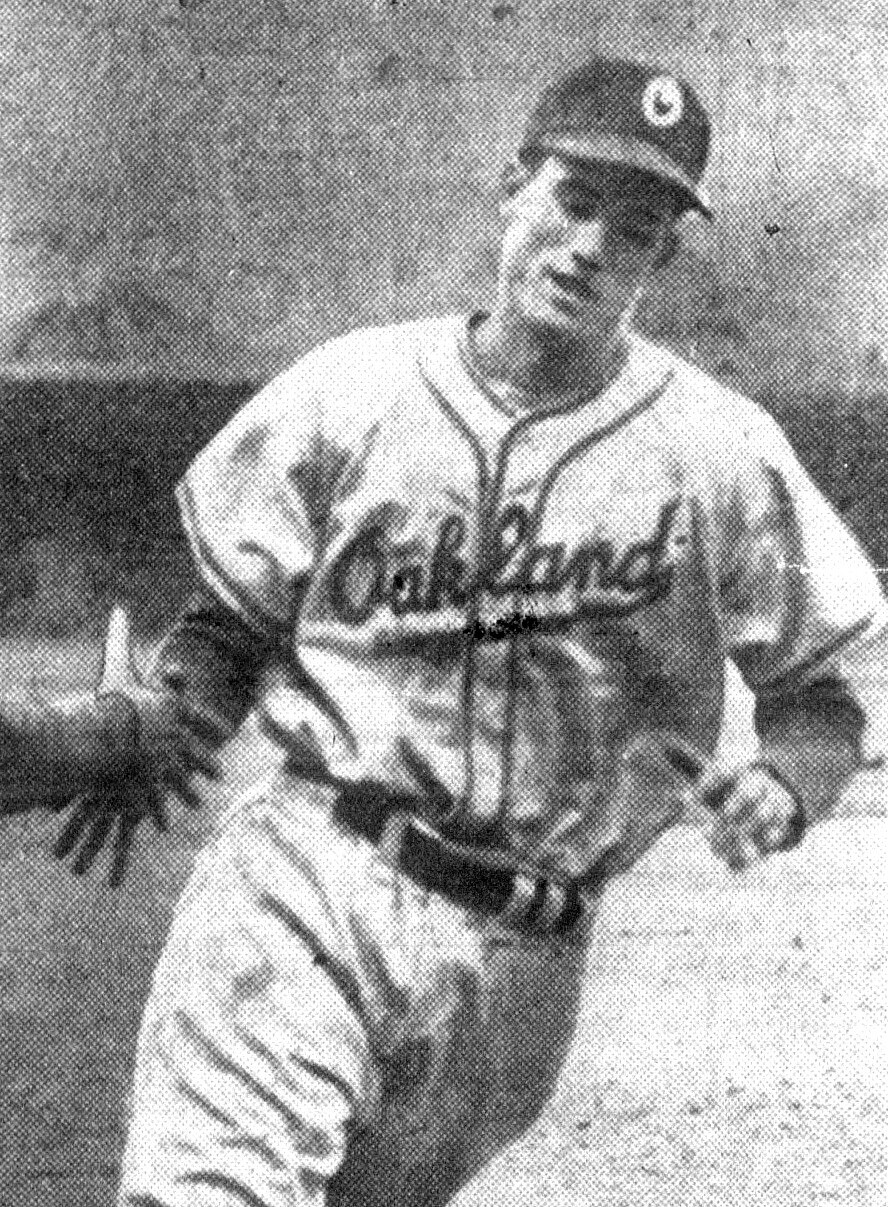
- Jennings in 1951
- Shortstop
- Born: September 28, 1925; St. Louis, Missouri
- Died: October 20, 2010 (aged 85); St. Louis, Missouri
- Batted: Right Threw: Right

MLB debut
- July 19, 1951, for the St. Louis Browns

Last MLB appearance
- September 30, 1951, for the St. Louis Browns

MLB statistics
- Batting average: .179
- Home runs: 0
- Runs batted in: 13
- Stats at Baseball Reference

Teams
- St. Louis Browns (1951)

William Lee Jennings (September 28, 1925 – October 20, 2010) was a shortstop in Major League Baseball. Listed at 6 ft 2 in (1.88 m), 175 lb., he batted and threw right-handed. He studied business at Washington University in St. Louis.

A native of St. Louis, Missouri, Jennings played briefly for the St. Louis Browns during the 1951 season. He was signed by the New York Giants in 1946 and immediately was assigned to their Minor league system. He then was purchased by the Browns from the Giants in 1951.

Jennings posted a .179 average (35-for-195) in 64 games for the Browns, driving in 13 runs and scoring 20 times, while collecting 10 doubles, two triples, and one stolen base. He also played for the Cleveland Indians and Chicago White Sox organizations, hitting a collective .255 with 68 home runs and 314 RBI in 897 minor league games from 1946 to 1953.

Jennings died in his hometown of St. Louis, Missouri, at the age of 85.
