= Bob DiPietro =

American baseball player (1927–2012)

- Right fielder
- Born: September 1, 1927; San Francisco, California, U.S.
- Died: September 3, 2012 (aged 85); Yakima, Washington, U.S.
- Batted: Right Threw: Right

MLB debut
- September 23, 1951, for the Boston Red Sox

Last MLB appearance
- September 30, 1951, for the Boston Red Sox

MLB statistics
- Batting average: .091
- At bats: 11
- Hits: 1
- Stats at Baseball Reference

Teams
- Boston Red Sox (1951)

Robert Louis Paul DiPietro (September 1, 1927 – September 3, 2012) was an American professional baseball player, an outfielder whose career lasted for 13 seasons (1947–1959). He had a brief trial as a right fielder in Major League Baseball for the Boston Red Sox during the final month of the 1951 season. He was born in San Francisco, California. Listed at 5 feet 11 inches (1.80 m) tall and 185 pounds (84 kg), he batted and threw right-handed.

In four MLB games played and 11 official at bats, DiPietro collected one hit, a single in his fourth and final game September 30 against Spec Shea of the New York Yankees, for an .091 batting average. He did score a run or collect an RBI. As a fielder, he appeared in three games and recorded four outs with one assist and committed one error for a .833 fielding percentage. He died in Yakima, Washington, on September 3, 2012, from cancer.
