= Paul Hinrichs =

American baseball player and minister (1925–2023)

- Relief pitcher
- Born: August 31, 1925; Marengo, Iowa, U.S.
- Died: April 9, 2023 (aged 97); Greenville, Kentucky, U.S.
- Batted: Right Threw: Right

MLB debut
- May 16, 1951, for the Boston Red Sox

Last MLB appearance
- June 21, 1951, for the Boston Red Sox

MLB statistics
- Win–loss record: 0–0
- Earned run average: 21.60
- Strikeouts: 1
- Stats at Baseball Reference

Teams
- Boston Red Sox (1951)

Paul Edwin Hinrichs (August 31, 1925 – April 9, 2023) was an American baseball player who was briefly a relief pitcher for the Boston Red Sox of Major League Baseball during the 1951 season. After his baseball career, Hinrichs became a Lutheran minister.

== Early life ==
Hinrichs was born to a family of German descent in Marengo, Iowa, the son of a Lutheran pastor, on August 31, 1925. He attended Concordia College in Saint Paul, Minnesota, and enrolled at Concordia Seminary in Clayton, Missouri in 1943. He married Frances Rauscher in 1948, and they had five children, one of whom predeceased him.

== Career ==
Hinrichs was signed to the Detroit Tigers organization in 1946, and first played in the West Texas–New Mexico League before going to the Dallas Rangers, the Tigers' Double A team. In 1948, ten minor league players within the Tigers farm system, including Hinrichs, were declared free agents after an investigation by Baseball Commissioner Happy Chandler found that the organization was keeping more players in their farm system than they were permitted to.

Hinrichs then signed with the New York Yankees, and was the first player to be given a signing bonus by the team. The bonus was reported to be $75,000 at the time, though later estimates varied, and in a 2015 interview, Hinrichs only said that it was above $50,000. He played for their Double-A affiliate, the Kansas City Blues. However, his performance was hampered by an injury, and in the Rule 5 draft after the 1950 season, he was drafted by the Boston Red Sox.

In four appearances for the Red Sox in the 1951 season, Hinrichs posted a 21.60 earned run average with one strikeout and four walks in 3⅓ innings pitched, without recording a decision. In the months after his last major league game on June 21, 1951, he was optioned to the San Francisco Seals, before he decided to leave baseball at the end of the year.

== Later life and death ==
Hinrichs followed his father's career and became a Lutheran minister. He was ordained at Our Redeemer Lutheran Church in Augusta, Georgia, on September 14, 1952. Hinrichs was sent to open a church in Aiken, South Carolina, followed by one in La Puente, California, before returning to St. Louis. He opened a congregation in Litchfield, Illinois, before retiring at age 63 and moving to Kentucky. Hinrichs died at a hospital in Greenville, Kentucky, on April 9, 2023, at age 97.
