= Joe Lutz =

American baseball player (1925–2008)

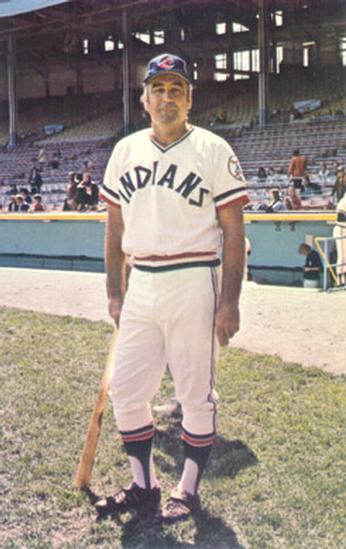
- First baseman
- Born: February 18, 1925; Keokuk, Iowa, U.S.
- Died: October 20, 2008 (aged 83); Sarasota, Florida, U.S.
- Batted: Left Threw: Left

MLB debut
- April 17, 1951, for the St. Louis Browns

Last MLB appearance
- May 6, 1951, for the St. Louis Browns

MLB statistics
- Batting average: .167
- Home runs: 0
- Runs batted in: 2
- Stats at Baseball Reference

Teams
- St. Louis Browns (1951)

Rollin Joseph Lutz (/lutz/ LOOTZ; February 18, 1925 – October 20, 2008) was an American professional baseball player and coach, as well as the first non-Japanese manager in Japanese professional baseball.

== Life ==
Lutz was born on February 18, 1925, in Keokuk, Iowa. Lutz was a high school baseball standout and signed a professional contract the St. Louis Browns in 1941. After the US became involved in World War II, Lutz enlisted in the United States Marine Corps after graduating from high school and served in the South Pacific theater.

=== Baseball career ===
After returning from military service, Lutz was signed by the St. Louis Browns as an amateur free agent before the 1946 season. He played for minor league teams in Elmira, New York and San Antonio, Texas in the Brown's farm system, while earning bachelor's and master's degrees in science. His only major league experience was when he appeared with the Browns in the 1951, playing first base and going 6-for-36 in 14 games, with one triple and 2 RBI in 14 games with the team for a .167 batting average. The Browns traded him on July 24, 1951, to the Brooklyn Dodgers together with Johnny Bero and cash in exchange for Ben Taylor.

=== Coaching ===
Following his major league career, Lutz coached high school baseball, football and basketball in Argyle, Iowa and Davenport, Iowa, where he led Davenport's baseball to a state championship, and was an athletic coach at Parsons College in Iowa.

Lutz became the head coach of the Southern Illinois University baseball team, leading the Salukis to the 1968 College World Series, in which they lost the final game 4–3 in nine innings to the University of Southern California Trojans, after finishing the regular season with a 34–12 record. Lutz was selected as the National Coach of the Year in 1968 by the American Association of College Coaches. The following season, Lutz led the #1 nationally ranked Salukis to a 36–7 regular season record and the 1969 College World Series. Having played in the major leagues for Bill Veeck, Lutz adopted some of his flourishes, including female batgirls, giveaway contests for fans and skydivers landing on the pitching mound. Through the 1969 season, Lutz had coached the team to a 149–48 record (plus two ties) in four seasons as coach.

The Cleveland Indians named Lutz as their first-base coach in 1971, after he had been coordinator of its minor league teams. He was on the team's coaching staff in 1972 and 1973.

He was hired by the Hiroshima Carp in 1974 as a batting instructor. The following season, Lutz became the first foreigner to manage a team in Japanese professional baseball, when he was selected to manage the Carp. Hall of Fame pitcher Warren Spahn was hired to serve as the team's temporary pitching coach, after having worked together with Lutz on the Indians' coaching staff. As manager, Lutz had the team change the color of its caps to red to represent the team's fighting spirit. Lutz left the team after 15 games due to an umpiring dispute, but the Carp went on to win its first-ever Central League championship under replacement manager Takeshi Koba.

=== Retirement ===
Lutz moved with his family to Sarasota, Florida in 1969 while he was part of the Cleveland Indians organization. He spent 12 years as the executive director of the Boys Club in Sarasota, until he left in 1988 following concerns regarding the financial management of the organization.

He died at age 83 on October 20, 2008, after years of declining health resulting from a stroke and diabetes.
