= Bobby Herrera =

Mexican baseball player (1926-2007)

- Pitcher
- Born: July 26, 1926; Nuevo Laredo, Tamaulipas, Mexico
- Died: August 23, 2007 (aged 81); Nuevo Laredo, Tamaulipas, Mexico
- Batted: Right Threw: Right

MLB debut
- April 19, 1951, for the St. Louis Browns

Last MLB appearance
- May 5, 1951, for the St. Louis Browns

MLB statistics
- Win–loss record: 0–0
- Earned run average: 27.00
- Strikeouts: 1
- Stats at Baseball Reference

Teams
- St. Louis Browns (1951)

Procopio Herrera "Bobby" Rodriguez (July 26, 1926 – August 23, 2007), nicknamed "Tito", was a Mexican Major League Baseball (MLB) pitcher who played for the St. Louis Browns in 1951.
