= Al Richter =

American baseball player (1927–2017)

- Shortstop
- Born: February 7, 1927; Norfolk, Virginia, U.S.
- Died: October 29, 2017 (aged 90); Virginia Beach, Virginia, U.S.
- Batted: Right Threw: Right

MLB debut
- September 23, 1951, for the Boston Red Sox

Last MLB appearance
- April 21, 1953, for the Boston Red Sox

MLB statistics
- Batting average: .091
- Home runs: 0
- Runs batted in: 0
- Stats at Baseball Reference

Teams
- Boston Red Sox (1951, 1953)

Allen Gordon Richter (February 7, 1927 – October 29, 2017) was an American professional baseball player.

== Biography ==
A shortstop from Norfolk, Virginia, he was listed at 5 feet 11 inches (1.80 m) tall and 165 pounds (75 kg). He batted and threw right-handed. Richter was Jewish; he attended Matthew Fontaine Maury High School in Norfolk, the University of Miami in Coral Gables, Florida, and Virginia Polytechnic Institute and State University in Blacksburg, Virginia.

Richter played ten seasons (1945; 1947–55) in minor league baseball and appeared in six Major League games for the Boston Red Sox in the 1951 and 1953 seasons, hitting a single in 11 at bats for a .091 batting average while scoring one run. In four fielding appearances, he made clean plays on his 20 chances and posted a 1.000 fielding percentage. His lone hit came off Spec Shea at Yankee Stadium on September 30, 1951. Richter's best minor league season came in 1951, when he batted .321 with 164 hits in 129 games played at the Triple-A level. Richter died in October 2017, aged 90.

== See also ==
- Boston Red Sox all-time roster
