= Dick Marlowe =

American baseball player (1929–1968)

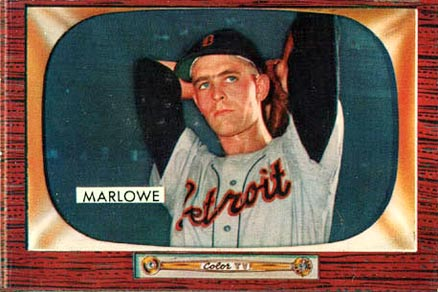
- Pitcher
- Born: June 27, 1929; Hickory, North Carolina, U.S.
- Died: December 30, 1968 (aged 39); Toledo, Ohio, U.S.
- Batted: Right Threw: Right

MLB debut
- September 19, 1951, for the Detroit Tigers

Last MLB appearance
- September 30, 1956, for the Chicago White Sox

MLB statistics
- Win–loss record: 13–15
- Earned run average: 4.99
- Strikeouts: 108
- Stats at Baseball Reference

Teams
- Detroit Tigers (1951–1956); Chicago White Sox (1956)

Richard Burton Marlowe (June 27, 1929 – December 30, 1968) was an American professional baseball pitcher who appeared in 98 games in Major League Baseball for the Detroit Tigers and Chicago White Sox from 1951 to 1956. Born in Hickory, North Carolina, he threw and batted right-handed and was listed as 6 feet 2 inches (1.88 m) tall and 165 pounds (75 kg). He attended Davidson College.

Davidson's professional career lasted from 1948 through 1957. In 1952, Marlowe, while pitching for the Triple-A Buffalo Bisons, became the second player in International League history to throw a perfect game. After late-season trials with the Tigers in both 1951 and 1952, Marlowe spent the full 1953 and 1954 seasons with Detroit, almost exclusively as a relief pitcher, with only 13 starting assignments in 70 games pitched. He spent most of 1955 and 1956 in the minor leagues. In September 1956, he was claimed off waivers by the White Sox, but worked in only one game for them, his last MLB appearance on September 30.

In his 98-game big-league career, Marlowe compiled a 13–15 won–lost record with three saves and a 4.99 earned run average, allowing 280 hits and 101 bases on balls—with 108 strikeouts—in 2431/3 innings pitched. In 17 starting assignments, he threw three complete games and no shutouts.

Marlowe died from cancer in Toledo, Ohio, on December 30, 1968.
