= Frank Saucier =

American baseball player (1926–2025)

- Outfielder
- Born: May 28, 1926; Leslie, Missouri, U.S.
- Died: March 3, 2025 (aged 98); Amarillo, Texas, U.S.
- Batted: Left Threw: Right

MLB debut
- July 21, 1951, for the St. Louis Browns

Last MLB appearance
- September 23, 1951, for the St. Louis Browns

MLB statistics
- Batting average: .071
- Home runs: 0
- Runs batted in: 1
- Stats at Baseball Reference

Teams
- St. Louis Browns (1951)

Francis Field Saucier (/soʊˈʃeɪ/ soh-SHAY; May 28, 1926 – March 3, 2025) was an American professional baseball player, an outfielder who played two months of the 1951 baseball season for the St. Louis Browns. He was known for being replaced by the shortest player in baseball history, Eddie Gaedel, who pinch-hit for him in a stunt devised by Browns' owner Bill Veeck in 1951, Saucier's only season in the big leagues.

In his eighteen-game major league career, Saucier had one hit in 14 at-bats, giving him a .071 batting average. He also had three walks, scored four runs, and had one run batted in. He was much more prolific in the minor leagues, however, hitting .348 in 1948, his first pro season, at Belleville in the Illinois State League, and followed that with a .446 average at Wichita Falls in 1949, which led all of professional baseball. This attracted the attention of Veeck, who signed him in July 1951, paying him a substantial bonus to return to baseball. In 1950, Saucier batted .343 for the San Antonio Missions to lead the Texas League in hitting, and won The Sporting News Minor League Player of the Year Award. An injury in 1951 and two years in the United States Navy during the Korean War (in addition to 38 months during World War II) short-circuited his playing time, and he never played in the majors again.

Saucier graduated from Westminster College in Fulton, Missouri, with a degree in math and physics; the baseball field there is named after him. The site is named Frank Saucier Field, a reflection of his full name Francis Field Saucier.

Saucier died in Amarillo, Texas, on March 3, 2025, at the age of 98.
