= Bud Thomas (shortstop) =

American baseball player (1929-2015)

- Shortstop
- Born: March 10, 1929; Sedalia, Missouri, U.S.
- Died: August 15, 2015 (aged 86); Sedalia, Missouri, U.S.
- Batted: Right Threw: Right

MLB debut
- September 2, 1951, for the St. Louis Browns

Last MLB appearance
- September 29, 1951, for the St. Louis Browns

MLB statistics
- Batting average: .350
- Home runs: 1
- Runs batted in: 1
- Stats at Baseball Reference

Teams
- St. Louis Browns (1951)

John Tillman "Bud" Thomas (March 10, 1929 – August 15, 2015) was an American Major League Baseball player. Thomas played for the St. Louis Browns in the 1951 season. In 14 career games, Thomas had seven hits in 20 at-bats, with a home run. He batted and threw right-handed and played shortstop.
