= Johnny Bero =

American baseball player (1922–1985)

- Shortstop
- Born: December 22, 1922; Gary, West Virginia, U.S.
- Died: May 11, 1985 (aged 62); Gardena, California, U.S.
- Batted: Left Threw: Right

MLB debut
- September 26, 1948, for the Detroit Tigers

Last MLB appearance
- July 22, 1951, for the St. Louis Browns

MLB statistics
- Batting average: .201
- Home runs: 5
- Runs batted in: 17
- Stats at Baseball Reference

Teams
- Detroit Tigers (1948); St. Louis Browns (1951)

John George Bero (December 22, 1922 – May 11, 1985) was an American professional baseball player, a shortstop who played a total of 65 games in the Major Leagues for the Detroit Tigers and the St. Louis Browns during 1948 and 1951. Bero was a native of Gary, West Virginia, who attended Western Michigan University. He batted left-handed, threw right-handed, stood 6 feet (1.8 m) tall and weighed 170 pounds (77 kg).

He played 61 games as a shortstop and second baseman for the 1951 Browns, batting .213 with all of his 34 MLB hits. He played his final game with the Browns on July 22 and two days later was traded to the Brooklyn Dodgers. He spent the rest of his career in minor league baseball.
