= Matt Batts =

American baseball player (1921–2013)

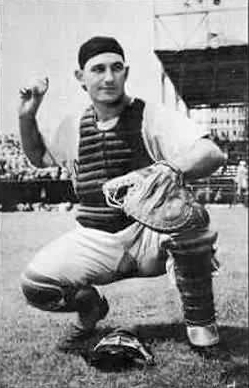
- Catcher
- Born: October 16, 1921; San Antonio, Texas, U.S.
- Died: July 14, 2013 (aged 91); Baton Rouge, Louisiana, U.S.
- Batted: Right Threw: Right

MLB debut
- September 10, 1947, for the Boston Red Sox

Last MLB appearance
- May 8, 1956, for the Cincinnati Reds

MLB statistics
- Batting average: .269
- Home runs: 26
- Runs batted in: 219
- Stats at Baseball Reference

Teams
- Boston Red Sox (1947–1951); St. Louis Browns (1951); Detroit Tigers (1952–1954); Chicago White Sox (1954); Cincinnati Reds (1955–1956)

Matthew Daniel Batts (October 16, 1921 – July 14, 2013) was an American professional baseball player. He played in Major League Baseball (MLB) as a catcher from 1947 through 1956 for the Boston Red Sox, St. Louis Browns, Detroit Tigers, Chicago White Sox and Cincinnati Reds. A slap hitter, Batts played mostly backup roles over the course of his career; during parts of ten MLB seasons, he appeared in 546 games with a .269 batting average, 26 home runs, and 219 runs batted in.

== Early and personal life ==
Batts was born in San Antonio, Texas. When his mother died, his father married his mother's sister. He was the uncle of former major leaguer Danny Heep.

== Path to the majors ==
Growing up in the sandlots of San Antonio, Batts batted and threw right-handed. But in a fluke position change up, he found his niche behind the plate on a semipro team. He was a freshman at Baylor University and was recruited by Red Sox scouts. However, in 1942 when he signed with Boston in exchange for paying his tuition, the Baylor team dropped him.

Batts' first season in the minor leagues was 1942, when he played for the Canton Terriers, Boston's affiliate in the Class C Middle Atlantic League. In 126 games, he batted .294, while hitting 10 home runs. He served in the United States Army Air Forces during World War II from December 1942 through December 1945; he was stationed at Randolph Field in Texas and rose to the rank of sergeant.

In 1946, Batts played for the Lynn Red Sox in the Class B New England League, appearing in 98 games and batting .337 with 12 home runs. While with the Lynn Red Sox, Don Newcombe, future Most Valuable Player in the National League, recalled Batts as being a "redneck from the South," and Batts thought it was funny to follow the old racist custom of rubbing a Negro's head for good luck.

During 1947, Batts played for two Boston affiliates; the Scranton Red Sox of the Class A Eastern League, and the Toronto Maple Leafs of the Class AAA International League. He only appeared in 8 games with Scranton, losing playing time to another catcher, before transferring to Toronto when their catcher was injured. With Toronto, Batts appeared in 110 games, batting .262 with 7 home runs. After Toronto's season ended, Batts was called up to Boston.

== Major League Baseball ==
=== Boston Red Sox ===
Batts debuted with the Red Sox on September 10 of the 1947 season, striking out as a pinch hitter. He appeared in 7 games before the end of the season, batting .500 (8-for-16).

During the 1948 season, as backup catcher to Birdie Tebbetts, Batts appeared in 46 games while batting .314 with 1 home run and 24 RBI. The Red Sox and Indians finished the season with identical records of 96–58, and had a playoff game that was won by the Indians. Batts was using sparingly down the stretch run, having only 12 plate appearances during September, and did not appear in the playoff game.

Batts had an increase in playing time the next two years; in 1949 he played in 60 games but only hit for a .242 average with 3 home runs and 31 RBI, while in 1950 he appeared in 75 games and raised his average to .273 with 4 home runs and 34 RBI. Batts was known for his anti-Semitic baiting of future MVP and four-time All Star Al Rosen, who challenged Batts but was interrupted by other players who rushed Batts away.

Manager Steve O'Neill took over the team, and Batts said "he didn't like me for some reason." Then in May 1951 Batts was traded to the Browns after getting off to a slow start, hitting just 4-for-29 (.138) in 11 games. In his 5 seasons with Boston, he appeared in a total of 199 games with a .272 batting average, 9 home runs, and 96 RBI.

=== St. Louis Browns ===
Batts spent the remainder of the 1951 season with the Browns, his only year with the club. He played in 79 games and hit .302 with 5 home runs and 31 RBI. On defense, despite his limited playing time led all catchers in the Major Leagues in errors committed, with 13, and led all Major League catchers in passed balls, with 11, and the 28 stolen bases he allowed were 5th-most among all AL catchers. He was among the first white catchers teamed with the American League's first black pitcher, Satchel Paige. During the offseason, Batts was traded to Detroit.

=== Detroit Tigers ===
In 1952, Batts was backup to the Tigers' starting catcher, Joe Ginsberg, and only appeared in 56 games, batting .237 with 3 home runs and 13 RBI. On August 25, Batts caught the second of pitcher Virgil Trucks' two no-hitters that season.

The following June, Ginsberg was traded, and Batts took over as starting catcher; for the 1953 season he appeared in 116 games with a .278 average, 6 home runs, and 42 RBI. He fielded 514 total chances, the most of his career, led all AL catchers in passed balls, with 13, the 24 stolen bases he allowed were 5th-most among all AL catchers, and he had a .986 fielding percentage, as his 7 errors at catcher were 5th-most of all NL catchers.

Early in the 1954 season he played in 12 games with the Tigers, batting 6-for-21 (.286), before being traded to the White Sox in late May.

=== Chicago White Sox ===
With the White Sox for the remainder of the 1954 season, Batts appeared in 55 games, and batted .228/.299/.342, with 3 home runs and 19 RBI. Between the two teams, for the season he batted .235/.303/.341.

=== Return to the minors ===
In December 1954, the White Sox traded Batts to the Baltimore Orioles, who in turn sold him to the Cleveland Indians in April 1955. He did not make a major league appearance with either team. He started the 1955 season with Cleveland's farm team, the Indianapolis Indians of the Class AAA American Association. He appeared in 51 games for Indianapolis, batting just .231 with 4 home runs and 18 RBI. In July, his contract was purchased by Cincinnati, when their backup catcher Hobie Landrith was injured.

=== Cincinnati Reds ===
Batts appeared in 26 games for the Reds during the 1955 season, batting .254 with no home runs and 13 RBI. During 1956 he only made 3 plate appearances with the Reds, going 0-for-2 with 1 walk. His last major league appearance was on May 8, when he grounded out as a pinch hitter. He spent most of the season with a Reds' farm team, the Nashville Volunteers of the Class AA Southern Association, hitting .258 in 98 games. The next season in the minors he batted .222/.298/.278 for AA Birmingham.

== After the majors ==
Batts played a final season in the minor leagues; during 1957 he spent time with the Birmingham Barons and the San Antonio Missions, both at the Class AA level, appearing in a total of 89 games with a .243 average. Later, Batts and his wife Arlene moved to Baton Rouge, Louisiana, after fans recruited him to coach baseball clinics and the sheriff recruited him to help with juvenile crime problems.

His wife started a printing company. He died at his home in Baton Rouge in 2013 at the age of 91.
