= Bangor Bangors =

- 1907–1950; (1907, 1949–1950); Bangor, Pennsylvania

Minor league affiliations
- Class: Independent (1907); Class D (1949–1950)
- League: Blue Mountain League (1907); North Atlantic League (1949–1950)

Major league affiliations
- Team: None

Minor league titles
- League titles (0): None

Team data
- Name: Bangor (1907) Bangor Pickers (1949) Bangor Bangors (1950)
- Ballpark: Bangor Stadium (1949–1950)

The Bangor Bangors were an American minor league baseball team based in Bangor, Pennsylvania, United States. Bangor teams played as members of the 1907 Blue Mountain League and the Class D level North Atlantic League in 1949 and 1950, hosting home games at Bangor Stadium. The team played a partial season in 1949 known as the "Pickers."

== History ==
Bangor first hosted minor league baseball in 1907 as members of the Independent level Blue Mountain League. The final league standings are unknown.

Minor league baseball returned to Bangor in 1949, when the Bangor Pickers became members of the eight–team Class D level North Atlantic League. The Carbondale Pioneer Blues, Hazleton Mountaineers, Lebanon Chix, Mahanoy City Brewers, Nazareth Barons, Peekskill Highlanders and Stroudsburg Poconos teams joined Bangor in beginning play on May 3, 1949.

On August 8, 1949, Bangor had a 44–55 record when the franchise transferred to Berwick, Pennsylvania, possibly due to flooding in Bangor. With a 59–75 overall record, the Bangor/Berwick team placed sixth in the North Atlantic League standings. Managed by Bill Long, the Pickers finished 40.5 games behind the first place Stroudsburg Poconos in the final regular season standings.

Bangor/Berwick player Joe Campinha, formerly of the Baltimore Elite Giants, is recognized as breaking the color barrier in the North Atlantic League, playing catcher for the 1949 Bangor/Berwick Pickers, while hitting .269.

In 1950, the Bangor Bangors resumed play as members of the North Atlantic League. Berwick also continued play in the eight–team league, hosting the Berwick Slaters. In their final season of play, Bangor finished the regular season with a record of 65–71. The Bangors placed sixth while drawing 15,302 at Bangor Stadium. Playing under manager Al Gardella, the Bangors finished their final season 23.5 games behind the first place Lebanon Chix. Player/manager Al Gardella managed his brother Danny Gardella on the 1950 Bangors. After the conclusion of the 1950 season, the North Atlantic League permanently folded after the final two seasons of North Atlantic League saw overall league attendance drop from 242,000 in 1949 to 175,000 in 1950.

Bangor, Pennsylvania has not hosted another minor league team.

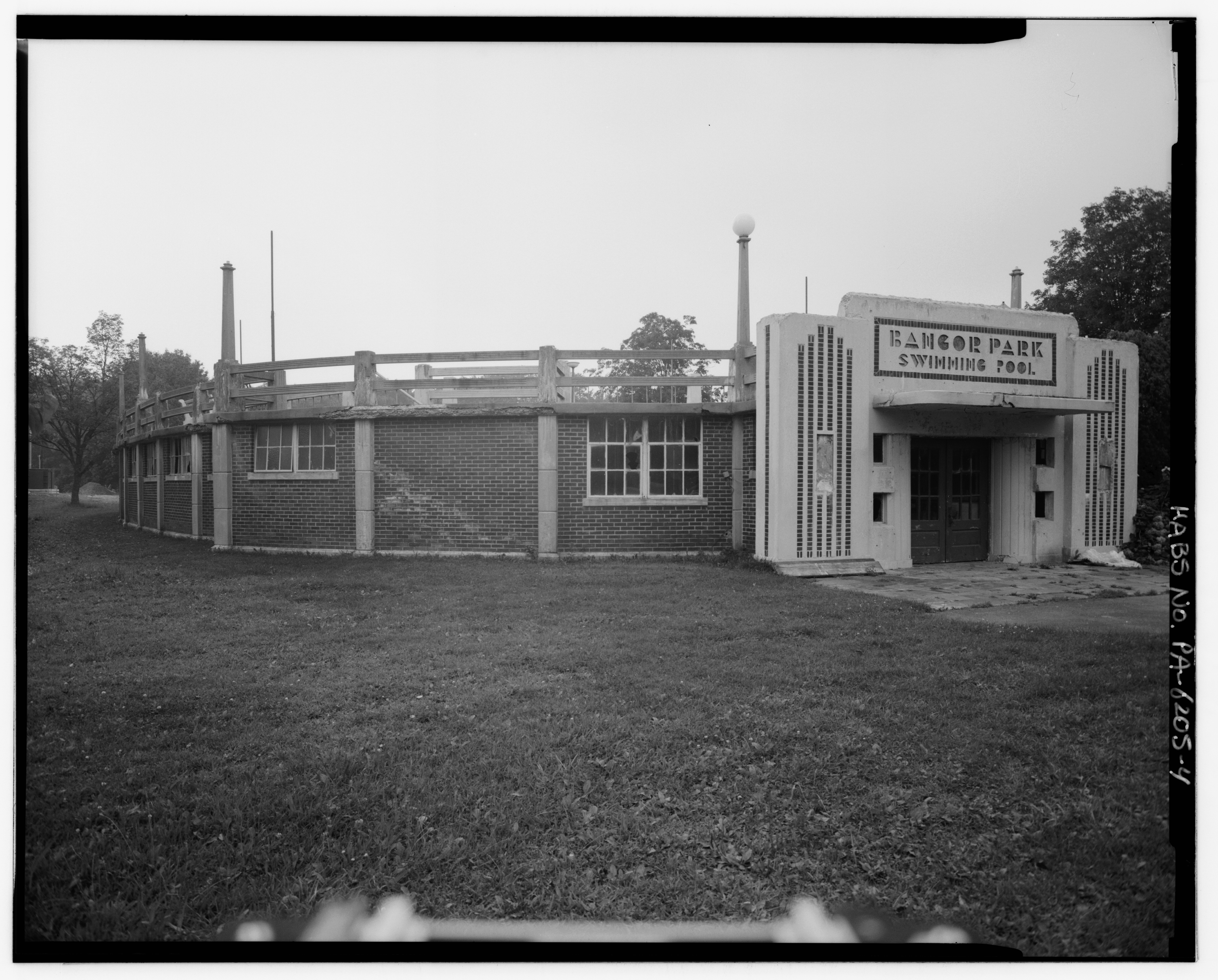
(1933) Bangor Memorial Park. Bangor, Pennsylvania

== The ballpark ==
Bangor teams were noted to have played minor league home games at Bangor Stadium in 1949 and 1950. Located within Bangor Borough Memorial Park, the ballpark had a capacity of 2,500 in 1949 and 2,800 in 1950. The ballpark address was 37 Broadway. Today, the park is called Bangor Veterans Memorial Park and remains a public park with ballfields and other amenities. The location is 197 Broadway, Bangor, Pennsylvania.

== Timeline ==
Year(s)	# Yrs.	Team	Level	League	Ballpark
1907	1	Bangor	Independent	Blue Mountain League	Unknown
1949	1	Bangor Pickers	Class D	North Atlantic League	Bangor Stadium
1950	1	Bangor Bangors	Class D	North Atlantic League	Bangor Stadium

== Year–by–year records ==
Year	Record	Finish	Attendance	Manager	Playoffs/Notes
1907	00–00	NA	NA	NA	League records unknown
1949	59–75	6th	27,112	Bill Long	Moved to Berwick August 8
1950	65–71	6th	15,302	Al Gardella	Did not qualify

== Notable alumni ==
- Joe Campinha (1949)
- Al Gardella (1950, MGR)
- Danny Gardella (1950)
