= Lansdale Dukes =

- 1948; Lansdale, Pennsylvania

Minor league affiliations
- Class: Class D (1948)
- League: North Atlantic League (1948)

Major league affiliations
- Team: None

Team data
- Name: Lansdale Dukes (1948)
- Ballpark: Weaver Field (1948)

The Lansdale Dukes were a minor league baseball team based in Lansdale, Pennsylvania. The Dukes played as members of the 1948 Class D level North Atlantic League, finishing last in their only season of minor league play. Lansdale finished the season with a 28–101 record, hosting home games at Weaver Field.

== History ==
Lansdale began minor league play in 1948, as the "Dukes" became members of the eight–team, Class D level North Atlantic League. Lansdale replaced the Kingston Dodgers franchise in the league. The Bloomingdale Troopers, Carbondale Pioneers, Mahanoy City Brewers, Nazareth Barons, Nyack Rockies, Peekskill Highlanders and Stroudsburg Poconos teams joined Lansdale in beginning league play on May 1, 1948.

The Lansdale Dukes began minor league play, hosting 1948 home games at Weaver Field and finishing last in the league standings. The Dukes ended the season a distant eighth place in the North Atlantic League, finishing 54.0 games behind the first place Peekskill Highlanders and 19.5 games behind the seventh place Nyack Rockies. In the North Atlantic League regular season, Lansdale had a record of 28–101, playing the season under managers William Leary, Whitey Mellor and Lawrence Glick. The 1948 total Lansdale home attendance was 14,400.

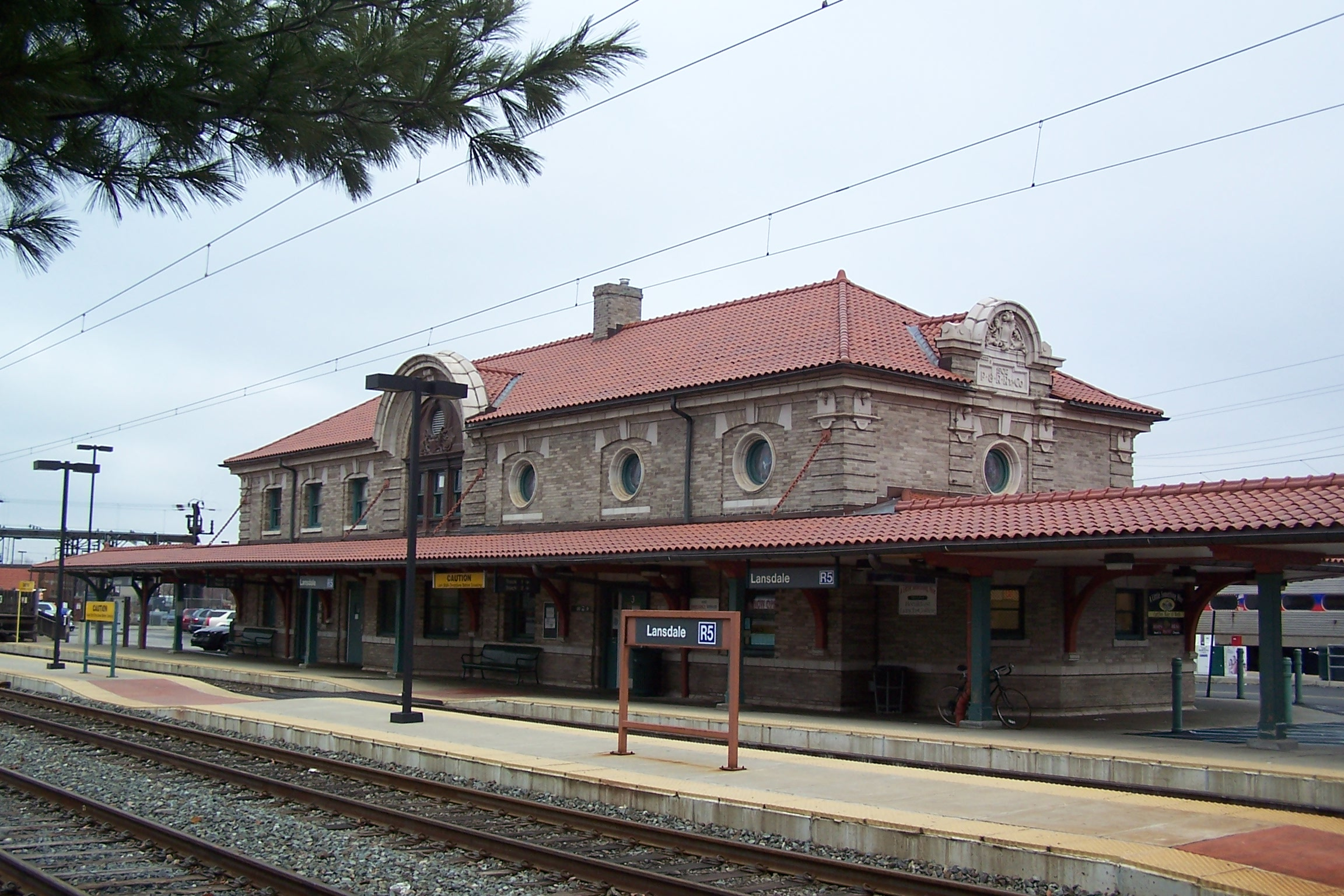
(2007) Train Station. Constructed in 1902 for the Philadelphia & Reading railroad. Lansdale, Pennsylvania

The Lansdale Dukes franchise folded after the 1948 season and did not return to the 1949 North Atlantic League. Lansdale has not hosted another minor league team.

== The ballpark ==
The 1948 Lansdale Dukes reportedly played minor league home games at Weaver Field in Memorial Park. First constructed in 1921, the ballpark had a capacity of 2,000 and was named for Joseph K. "Dobbie" Weaver, a coach and counselor. Located at 300 East Main & South Line Street in Lansdale, Pennsylvania, the park is still in use today.

== Year–by–year record ==
Year	Record	Finish	Manager(s)	Attend	Playoffs/Notes
1948	28–101	8th	William Leary / Whitey Mellor / Lawrence Glick	14,100	Did not qualify

== Notable alumni ==
- Tony Parisse (1948)
