= Shamokin Maroons =

- 1887–1888; Shamokin, Pennsylvania

Minor league affiliations
- Class: Independent (1887–1888)
- League: Central Pennsylvania League (1887–1888)

Major league affiliations
- Team: None

Minor league titles
- League titles (0): None

Team data
- Name: Shamokin Maroons (1887–1888)
- Ballpark: Unknown (1887–1888)

The Shamokin Maroons were a minor league baseball team based in Shamokin, Pennsylvania. In 1887 and 1888, the Maroons played exclusively as members of the independent Central Pennsylvania League, winning the 1887 league championship before folding during the 1888 season.

== History ==
After hosting a team in the semi–professional Central Pennsylvania league in 1886, the 1887 Shamokin Maroons became the first minor league baseball team based in Shamokin, Pennsylvania. The 1887 Central Pennsylvania League was accorded protection under the National Agreement, becoming a certified minor league.

The Maroons became charter members of the eight–team Central Pennsylvania League. The Ashland, Danville, Hazleton, Mahanoy City, Minersville, Mount Carmel Reliance and Sunbury teams joined Shamokin in beginning league play on June 18, 1887.

In their first season of play, the 1887 Shamokin Maroons captured the Central Pennsylvania League championship. The Maroons finished the season in first place with a record of 33–20, finishing 1.5 games ahead of second place Hazleton. John Eisenhart managed the team to the league championship.

The Maroons continued play in the 1888 Central Pennsylvania League but were unable to defend their championship, as the team folded during the season. On July 7, 1888, the Maroons folded after compiling a record of 12–15, playing under manager J. B. Young. After the Maroons folded, Young was hired to managed the Mount Carmel Reliance for the remainder of the season. A native of the region, Young eventually settled in Shamokin and died in the city at age 80. The Hazelton Pugilists were the eventual league champions in 1888.

Minor league baseball returned to Shamokin when the 1897 Shamokin Reds began the season as members of the Class F level Central Pennsylvania League before the team relocated to Lock Haven, Pennsylvania during the season. On June 26, 1897, the Shamokin team, also referred to as the "Coal Heavers," moved to become the Lock Haven Maroons, with a 13–17 record.

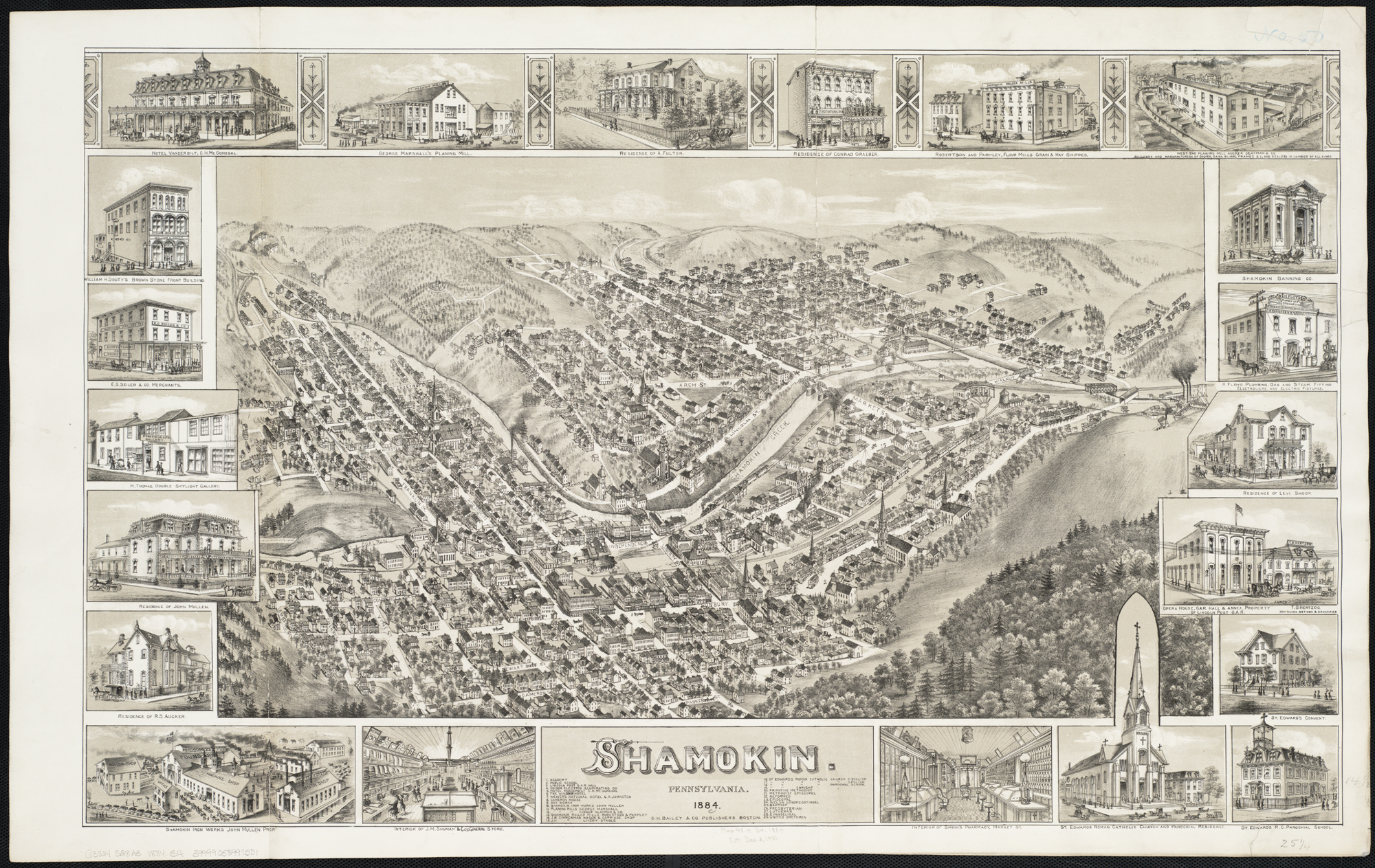
1884 illustration of Shamokin, Pennsylvania

== The ballpark ==
The name of the Shamokin Maroons' home minor league ballpark in 1887 and 1888 is not directly referenced.

== Timeline ==
Year(s)	# Yrs.	Team	Level	League
1887–1888	2	Shamokin Maroons	Independent	Central Pennsylvania League

== Year–by–year records ==
Year	Record	Finish	Manager	Playoffs/notes
1887	33–20	1st	John Eisenhart	No playoffs held
1888	12–15	NA	J. B. Young	Team folded July 7

== Notable alumni ==
- George Carman (1888)
- Cupid Childs (1877)
- John Culler (1887)
- Jimmy Dee (1888)
- Bill Farmer (1887)
- Mike Gaule (1888)
- Tom Gettinger (1888)
- John Graff (1887)
- Charlie Hilsey (1887-1888)
- Elias Peak (1887)
- Piggy Ward (1887)
- George Wetzel (1888)
- J. B. Young (1888, MGR)

== See also ==
Shamokin Maroons players
