= Lebanon Chix =

- 1949–1950; Lebanon, Pennsylvania

Minor league affiliations
- Class: Class D (1949–1950)
- League: North Atlantic League (1949–1950)

Major league affiliations
- Team: St. Louis Cardinals (1949–1950)

Minor league titles
- League titles (1): 1950
- Conference titles (1): 1950
- Wild card berths (1): 1949

Team data
- Name: Lebanon Chix (1949–1950)
- Ballpark: Grimes Stadium (1949–1950)

The Lebanon Chix were a minor league baseball team based in Lebanon, Pennsylvania. In 1949 and 1950, the Chix played as members of the North Atlantic League and were a minor league affiliate of the St. Louis Cardinals. After qualifying for the 1949 playoffs, Lebanon won the 1950 North Atlantic League championship in the final season of play for the league. Lebanon hosted home games at Grimes Stadium, built by the owners of the Chix.

== History ==
Lebanon first hosted minor league baseball with the 1889 "Lebanon" team, who played as members of the Middle States League. The Lebanon Chix were immediately preceded by the 1904 "Lebanon" team, which played as members of the Tri-State League.

Two local brothers had founded and supported the semi–pro "College Hill Chix" team beginning in 1945. Former major league player Jim Bucher managed the team beginning in 1946, leading the Chix to a 4th-place finish in the 1948 National Baseball Congress tournament in Wichita, Kansas. Following the 1948 season, owners of the semi–pro Chix team purchased the Bloomingdale Troopers of the North Atlantic League and moved the franchise to Lebanon, to play in the recently built Grimes Stadium. Brothers Cole and Charlie Grimes, local business owners, built the ballpark and were financers of the team.

Jim Bucher removed himself from field manager and served as business manager when the "Lebanon Chix" were formed. Bucher secured a major league affiliation for the franchise.

Minor league baseball returned to Lebanon in 1949, when the Lebanon Chix became members of the eight–team Class D level North Atlantic League, playing as a minor league affiliate of the St. Louis Cardinals. Lebanon joined the Bangor Pickers, Carbondale Pioneers, Hazleton Mountaineers, Mahanoy City Bluebirds, Nazareth Barons, Peekskill Highlanders and Stroudsburg Poconos in beginning league play on May 3, 1949.

The Lebanon Chix' home opener was an 8:30 night game against the Nazareth Barons. The opening ceremonies began at 8:00 P.M., featuring a flag raising and music by the Palmyra American Legion Band. General admission was $0.75, children $0.30 and reserved seats $0.95. Bus service was provided to the ballpark, leaving from 8th and Cumberland at 7:00 P.M.

In their first season, the Chix placed second in the North Atlantic League regular season standings and qualified for the playoffs. With a record of 80–56, playing under manager Hal Contini, Lebanon finished 20.5 games behind the first place Stroudsburg Poconos, who finished with a 101–36 record. Beginning play at Grimes Stadium, Lebanon had home attendance of 33,000. In the 1949 playoffs, the Peekskill Highlanders defeated Lebanon 4 games to 1 in the first round.

In their final season, the Lebanon Chix captured the 1950 North Atlantic League championship. With Hal Contini returning as manager, the Lebanon Chix won the regular season pennant in the North Atlantic League. The Chix ended the 1950 regular season with a record of 87–46, to place first in the standings, finishing 5.5 games ahead of the second place Stroudsburg Poconos. In the Playoffs, Lebanon defeated the Carbondale Pioneers 4 games to 3 to advance. In the Finals, the Lebanon Chix were leading Stroudsburg 3 games to 2 when the series was ended due to weather.

Following the 1950 season, the North Atlantic League folded and did not return to play. Lebanon, Pennsylvania has not fielded another minor league team.

== The ballpark ==
The Lebanon Chix hosted 1949 and 1950 home minor league home games at Grimes Stadium. The ballpark was named for Cole E. Grimes and opened in 1946. The ballpark was also home to the Fredericksburg High School baseball games until 1958. Today, the grandstand has been repurposed as a storage facility. The location is US 22 & Main Street in Fredericksburg, Lebanon County, Pennsylvania.

== Year–by–year records ==
Year	Record	Finish	Manager	Attend	Playoffs/Notes
1949	80–56	2nd	Hal Contini	33,000	Lost in 1st round
1950	87–46	1st	Hal Contini	18,916	League champions

== Notable alumni ==
- Jim Bucher (1948–1949, Executive)
- Ken Boyer (1948) St. Louis Cardinals #14 Retired
