= Mount Carmel Reliance =

- 1887–1888; Mount Carmel, Pennsylvania

Minor league affiliations
- Class: Independent (1887–1888)
- League: Central Pennsylvania League (1887–1888)

Major league affiliations
- Team: None

Minor league titles
- League titles (0): None

Team data
- Name: Mount Carmel Reliance (1887–1888)
- Ballpark: Mount Carmel Town Park* (1887–1888)

The Mount Carmel Reliance were a minor league baseball team based in Mount Carmel, Pennsylvania. In 1887 and 1888, the Reliance played exclusively as members of the independent Central Pennsylvania League.

== History ==
After playing in the semi–professional Central Pennsylvania league in 1886, the 1887 Mount Carmel "Reliance" team became the first minor league baseball team based in Mount Carmel, Pennsylvania. The 1887 Central Pennsylvania League was accorded protection under the National Agreement, becoming a certified minor league. The Reliance became charter members of the Independent eight–team Central Pennsylvania League, beginning league play on June 18, 1887.

In their first season of play, the 1887 Mount Carmel team finished the season in fourth place with a record of 21–21. Playing under manager Charlie Gessner, Mount Carmel ended the season 6.0 games behind the first place Shamokin Maroons in the final Central Pennsylvania League standings.

Continuing minor league play in 1888, the Mount Carmel Reliance placed fifth in the Central Pennsylvania League. After the team began the season with a record of 11–20, manager Kendrick was replaced by player J. B. Young, who led the Reliance to a 7–11 record under his direction. The Reliance ended the season with an overall record of 17–31, playing under managers Kendrick and Young. In the final standings, Mount Carmel ended the season 12.0 games behind the first place Hazelton Pugilists.

Mount Carmel player/manager J.B. Young was a native of Mount Carmel.

The Central Pennsylvania League did not play in the 1889 season. Mount Carmel later hosted teams in the 1908 and 1909 Atlantic League and 1928 Anthracite League, both leagues playing as independent leagues.

== The ballpark ==
The name of the Mount Carmel Reliance home minor league ballpark in 1887 and 1888 is not directly referenced. The Mount Carmel Town Park was in use in the era, having been established in 1853 and is still in use today.

== Timeline ==
| Year(s) | # Yrs. | Team | Level | League |
|---|---|---|---|---|
| 1887–1888 | 2 | Mount Carmel Reliance | Independent | Central Pennsylvania League |

== Year–by–year records ==
| Year | Record | Finish | Manager | Playoffs/notes |
|---|---|---|---|---|
| 1887 | 21–21 | 4th | Charlie Gessner | No playoffs held |
| 1888 | 17–31 | 5th | Kendrick / J. B. Young | No playoffs held |

== Notable alumni ==
- John Cullen (1887)
- Jimmy Dee (1888)
- Charlie Gessner (1887, MGR)
- Charlie McCullough (1888)
- Billy Taylor (1887)
- George Wetzel (1888)
- J. B. Young (1887), (1888, MGR)

=== See also ===
Mt. Carmel (minor league baseball) players
