= Bloomsburg Blue Jays =

- 1897; Bloomsburg, Pennsylvania

Minor league affiliations
- Class: Class F (1897)
- League: Central Pennsylvania League (1897)

Major league affiliations
- Team: None

Minor league titles
- League titles (0): None

Team data
- Name: Bloomsburg Blue Jays (1897)
- Ballpark: Unknown (1897)

The Bloomsburg Blue Jays were a minor league baseball team based in Bloomsburg, Pennsylvania. In 1897, the Blue Jays played as members of the Central Pennsylvania League, placing 2nd in their only season of play, as the league permanently folded following the 1897 season.

== History ==
In the 1897 season, the Bloomsburg Blue Jays began play as members of the reformed six–team Class F level Central Pennsylvania League. Bloomsburg joined the Milton, Posttville, Shamokin Reds, Sunbury Railroaders, and Williamsport Demorest teams in beginning league play on May 15, 1887. The Bloomsburg team was also referred to as the "Bluebirds."

In 1897, Central Pennsylvania League play, the Blue Jays ended the season with a record of 44–47. Managed by Pop Watts, Bloomsburg placed second in the final overall standings, finishing 14.0 games behind the 1first place Milton team. Bloomsburg tied with the Shamokin Reds/Lock Haven Maroons (45–48) team for 2nd place. The league held no playoffs.

Future major league players Bert Conn, Bill Hallman, Red Owens, and Bill Rotes played for the Bloomsburg Blue Jays.

The Central Pennsylvania League did not return to play following the 1897 season. Bloomsburg, Pennsylvania, has not hosted another minor league team.

== The ballpark ==
The name of the Bloomsburg home minor league ballpark in 1897 is unknown.

== Year–by–year record ==
Year	Record	Finish	Manager	Playoffs/notes
1897	44–47	2nd (tie)	Pop Watts	No playoffs held

== Notable alumni ==
- Albert K. Aldinger (1897)
- Bert Conn (1897)
- Bill Hallman (1897)
- Red Owens (1897)
- Bill Rotes (1897)

=== See also ===
Bloomsburg Blue Jays players
