= Central Pennsylvania League =

Late nineteenth-century minor baseball league based in Pennsylvania

- Classification: Independent (1886–1888, 1896, 1898); Class F (1897)
- Sport: Minor League Baseball
- First season: 1887
- Folded: 1898
- President: S.Y.M. Hollopeter (1888); Albert D. Miller (1897)
- No. of teams: 14
- Country: United States of America
- Most titles: 1 Shamokin Maroons (1887); Hazelton Pugilists (1888); Milton (1897)
- Related competitions: Pennsylvania League

The Central Pennsylvania League was a minor league baseball league which operated in several Pennsylvania cities from 1887 to 1888 and again from 1896 to 1898.

== Cities represented ==
- Ashland, PA: Ashland 1887–1888
- Bloomsburg, PA: Bloomsburg Blue Jays 1897
- Danville, PA: Danville 1887
- Hazleton, PA: Hazleton 1887; Hazleton Pugilists 1888
- Lock Haven, PA: Lock Haven Maroons 1897
- Mahanoy City, PA: Mahanoy City 1887–1888
- Milton, PA: Milton 1896–1897
- Minersville, PA: Minersville 1887
- Mount Carmel, PA: Mount Carmel Reliance 1887–1888
- Pottsville, PA: Pottsville Grays 1897
- Shamokin, PA: Shamokin Maroons 1887–1888; Shamokin Reds 1897
- Shenandoah, PA: Shenandoah Hungarian Rioters 1888
- Sunbury, PA: Sunbury 1887; Sunbury Railroaders 1897
- Williamsport, PA: Williamsport Demorest 1897

== Yearly standings ==
=== 1887 Central Pennsylvania League ===
Team Standings	W	L	PCT	GB	Managers
Shamokin Maroons	33	20	.622	--	Krouse
Hazleton	31	20	.607	1.0	Frank Stahr
Ashland	27	20	.574	3.0	NA
Mount Carmel Reliance	21	21	.500	6.5	Charlie Gessner
Sunbury	21	23	.477	7.5	Joseph Young
Danville	15	26	.365	12.0	Art McCoy
Mahanoy City	16	28	.363	12.5	James Quirk
Minersville	0	6	.000	NA	Charles Steel

=== 1888 Central Pennsylvania League ===
Team Standings	W	L	PCT	GB	Managers
Hazelton Pugilists	30	20	.600	-	Charlie Gessner
Shenandoah Hungarian Rioters	28	22	.560	2.0	J.M. Crinnan
Ashland	25	22	.532	3.5	George Cain
Mahanoy City	24	26	.480	6.0	Amos Walbridge
Mount Carmel Reliance	17	31	.354	12.0	Kendrick / J. B. Young
Shamokin Maroons	12	15	.444	NA	J. B. Young

Shamokin disbanded July 7.
Hazleton withdrew August 7 to join Central League.

=== 1897 Central Pennsylvania League ===
Team Standings	W	L	PCT	GB	Managers
Milton	57	32	.640	--	Harry Griffith
Bloomsburg Blue Jays	44	47	.484	14.0	Pop Watts
Shamokin Reds / Lock Haven Maroons	45	48	.484	14.0	Jacob Herrold / C.H. Myers
Williamsport Demorest	35	49	.417	19.5	David Spence / Peter Herdic / Spencer Ansell / Joe Stewart
Sunbury Railroaders	42	30	.583	NA	W.B. Masser
Pottsville Grays	8	13	.381	NA	Terence Connell
Shamokin	17	29	.370	NA	R.F. Glick

Sunbury entered the league June 3; Shamokin (13–17) transferred to Lock Haven June 26; Pottsville disbanded June 27.
A new Shamokin team entered the league July 11, taking Pottsville's record, then disbanded September 6.
