= Nazareth Barons =

- 1946–1950; Nazareth, Pennsylvania

Minor league affiliations
- Class: Class D (1946–1950)
- League: North Atlantic League (1946–1950)

Major league affiliations
- Team: Detroit Tigers (1947)

Minor league titles
- League titles (0): None
- Wild card berths (1): 1946

Team data
- Name: Nazareth Cement Dusters (1946); Nazareth Tigers (1947); Nazareth Barons (1948–1950)
- Ballpark: Nazareth Borough Park (1946–1950)

The Nazareth Barons were a minor league baseball team based in Nazareth, Pennsylvania. From 1946 to 1950, Nazareth teams played exclusively as members of the Class D level North Atlantic League, qualifying for the 1946 playoffs and finishing in last place in both of their final two seasons. Nazareth was a minor league affiliate of the Detroit Tigers in 1947. Nazateth hosted home minor league home games at Nazareth Borough Park.

== History ==
=== Early Nazareth baseball ===
Minor league baseball began in Nazareth in 1907, when the Nazareth team played the season as members of the independent Blue Mountain League. A printed postcard of the 1907 Nazareth team identified them as the "pennant winners" of the Blue Mountain League.

=== 1946: North Atlantic League ===
Minor league baseball returned in 1946, when the Nazareth "Cement Dusters" became charter members of the eight-team Class D level North Atlantic League. The Bloomingdale Troopers, Carbondale Pioneers, Mahanoy City Bluebirds, Newburgh Hummingbirds, Nyack Rockies, Peekskill Highlanders and Stroudsburg Poconos joined Nazareth in beginning league play on May 8, 1946.

The Cement Dusters name was picked by Donald Kemmerer and Sam Aristidew, who both received a season pass. Legend says the name came from the Lehigh Cement Company that had been in business since 1897. The cement would blow across the street onto the Nazareth Speedway covering the all dirt-track with cement dust. The dust would kick up during auto races and visible to fans in the grandstand. Nazareth Park Field was less than two miles away from the track and cement factory.

The Nazareth Cement Dusters qualified for the 1946 playoffs in their first season of play in the North Atlantic League. The Cement Dusters ended the 1946 season with a 78–40 record, placing second in the standings, playing under manager Stan Benjamin. Nazareth finished 6.0 games behind the first place Peekskill Highlanders. In the first round of the playoffs, the Carbondale Pioneers defeated the Nazareth four games to one. It would be the only playoff appearance for Nazareth.

=== 1947 to 1950: North Atlantic League ===
In 1947, Nazareth played as a minor league affiliate of the Detroit Tigers and adopted the "Tigers" nickname for the season. John Mueller served as manager as the Tigers placed fifth in the regular season with a record of 64–66, finishing 17½ games behind the first place Kingston Dodgers in the regular season standings and missing the league playoffs.

Nazareth continued North Atlantic League play in 1948, becoming known as the "Nazareth Barons." Ending the 1948 season with a record of 52–72, the Barons placed sixth in the regular season standings, finishing 27½ games behind the 1st place Peekskill Highlanders. Playing under player/Manager Bill Burich, Nazareth did qualify for the four-team playoffs.

Local newspapers nicknamed the 1948 team "Burich's Barons."

The 1949 Nazareth finished last in the eight-team North Atlantic League, their first of two consecutive last place finishes in the league standings. Placing eighth with a record of 52–86, the Barons were managed by Dick Errickson and Charles Heath. Nazareth finished 49½ games behind the first place 101-35 Stroudsburg Poconos and did not qualify for the four–team playoffs.

In their final season of play, the 1950 Nazareth Barons again finished last in the North Atlantic League Standings. The Barons placed eighth and did not qualify for the playoffs. Nazareth ended the 1950 season with a record of 35–90, finishing 48.0 games behind the first place Lebanon Chix, playing under manager Irvin Fortune in their final season.

The North Atlantic League permanently folded after the conclusion of the 1950 season. Nazareth has not hosted another minor league team.

== The ballpark ==
The Nazareth teams played home North Atlantic League minor league games at Nazareth Borough Park. The park was constructed beginning in 1935 as a Works Progress Administration project. Still in use today as a public park with a ballfield, "Nazareth Borough Park" is located on North Broad Street.

== Timeline ==
Year(s)	# Yrs.	Team	Level	League	Affiliate	Ballpark
1946	1	Nazareth Cement Dusters	Class D	North Atlantic League	None	Nazareth Borough Park
1947	1	Nazareth Tigers	Class D	North Atlantic League	Detroit Tigers	Nazareth Borough Park
1948–1950	3	Nazareth Barons	Class D	North Atlantic League	None	Nazareth Borough Park

== Year–by–year records ==
Year	Record	Finish	Manager	Attend	Playoffs/notes
1946	78–40	2nd	Stan Benjamin	31,465	Lost in 1st round
1947	64–66	5th	John Mueller	31,000	Did not qualify
1948	52–72	6th	Bill Burich	22,985	Did not qualify
1949	52–86	8th	Dick Errickson / Charles Heath	17,176	Did not qualify
1950	35–90	8th	Irvin Fortune	8,567	Did not qualify

== Notable alumni ==
- Stan Benjamin (1946, MGR)
- Bill Burich (1948, MGR)
- Dick Errickson (1949, MGR)

== See also ==
- Nazareth Barons players
- Nazareth Cement Dusters players
