= Nyack Rocklands =

- 1946–1948; Nyack, New York

Minor league affiliations
- Class: Class D (1946–1948)
- League: North Atlantic League (1946–1948)

Major league affiliations
- Team: Philadelphia Athletics (1947)

Minor league titles
- League titles (0): None

Team data
- Name: Nyack Rocklands (1946–1948)
- Ballpark: Nyack High School (1946–1948)

The Nyack Rocklands were a minor league baseball team based in Nyack, New York. The Rocklands were unofficially nicknamed the "Rockies" and played as members of the Class D level North Atlantic League from 1946 to 1948. The 1947 Nyack Rocklands were a minor league affiliate of the Philadelphia Athletics. Nyack hosted home minor league games at the Nyack High School ballpark.

== History ==
Minor league baseball began in Nyack, New York in 1946. The Nyack Rocklands became charter members of the Class D level North Atlantic League. The team use of the "Rocklands" moniker corresponds with Nyack, New York being located in Rockland County. The 1946 North Atlantic League standings featured the first place Peekskill Highlanders (82–32), followed by the Nazareth Cement Dusters (78–40), Stroudsburg Poconos (72–47), Carbondale Pioneers (69–48), Nyack Rockies (67–53), Bloomingdale Troopers (41–78), Mahanoy City Bluebirds (30–79) and Newburgh Hummingbirds/Walden Hummingbirds (27–89).

The 1946 Nyack Rocklands finished their first season of play in the North Atlantic League in fifth place with a record of 67–53. Emil Schwob was the manager, his first of two seasons with the club. The Rocklands played their games at the Nyack High School Field, where they had 1946 season attendance of 37,551, an average of 626 per home game.

In their second season of North Atlantic League play, the 1947 The Nyack Rocklands became a minor league affiliate of the Philadelphia Athletics and finished last in the league standings. The 1947 season saw Nyack finish with a record of 49–83 and in eighth place in the league standings, playing under manager Emil Schwob. Season attendance was 26,000, an average of 394.

Nyack played their final minor league season in 1948. The Nyack Rocklands ended the 1948 North Atlantic League season with a record of 46–82, placing seventh in the North Atlantic League standings. The 1948 Rocklands were managed by Roland Sabatini and Brandy Davis. The 1948 season attendance averaged 344 per game with a total of 22,048. The Nyak franchise permanently folded after the season.

Nyack, New York has not hosted another minor league team.

== The ballpark ==
From 1946 to 1948 the Nyack Rocklands were noted to have played minor league home games at Nyack High School Field. The ballpark was the field for Nyack High School. The ballpark had a capacity of 3,500 and admission was .50 cents. The ballpark had lights and steel towers that were moved from the former Clarkstown Country Club ballpark to the high school field as part of a Works Project Administration project at the high school ballpark. Still in use today at the high school, and known as McCallman Field, the ballpark is located at Haven Court & North Franklin Street at 5th Avenue & North Midland Avenue, Nyack, New York.

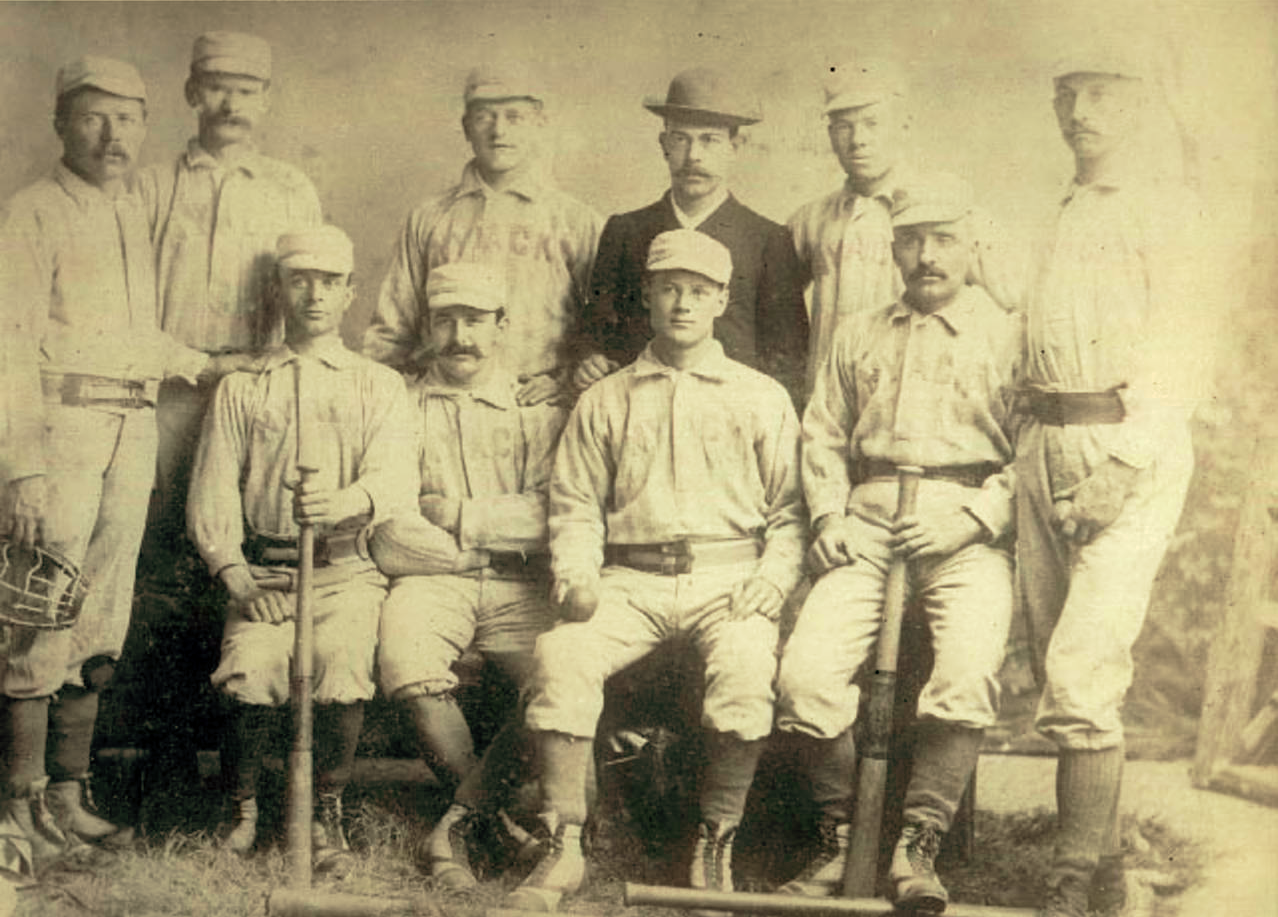
(1886) Nyack town baseball team with Doc Leitner.

== Timeline ==
Year(s)	# Yrs.	Team	Level	League	Affiliate	Ballpark
1946	1	Nyack Rocklands	Class D	North Atlantic League	None	Nyack High School Field
1947	1	Nyack Rocklands	Class D	North Atlantic League	Philadelphia Athletics	Nyack High School Field
1948	1	Nyack Rocklands	Class D	North Atlantic League	None	Nyack High School Field

== Year–by–year records ==
Year	Record	Finish	Manager	Playoffs/Notes
1946	67–53	5th	Emil Schwob	Did not qualify
1947	49–83	8th	Emil Schwob	Did not qualify
1948	46–82	7th	Roland Sabatini / Robert Davis	Did not qualify

== Notable alumni ==
- Charlie Fuchs (1948)
- Doc Leitner (1886)
- Fred Hahn (1947-1948)
- Bill Kalfass (1946)
- Alex Garbowski (1946)
