= Stan Benjamin =

American baseball player (1914–2009)

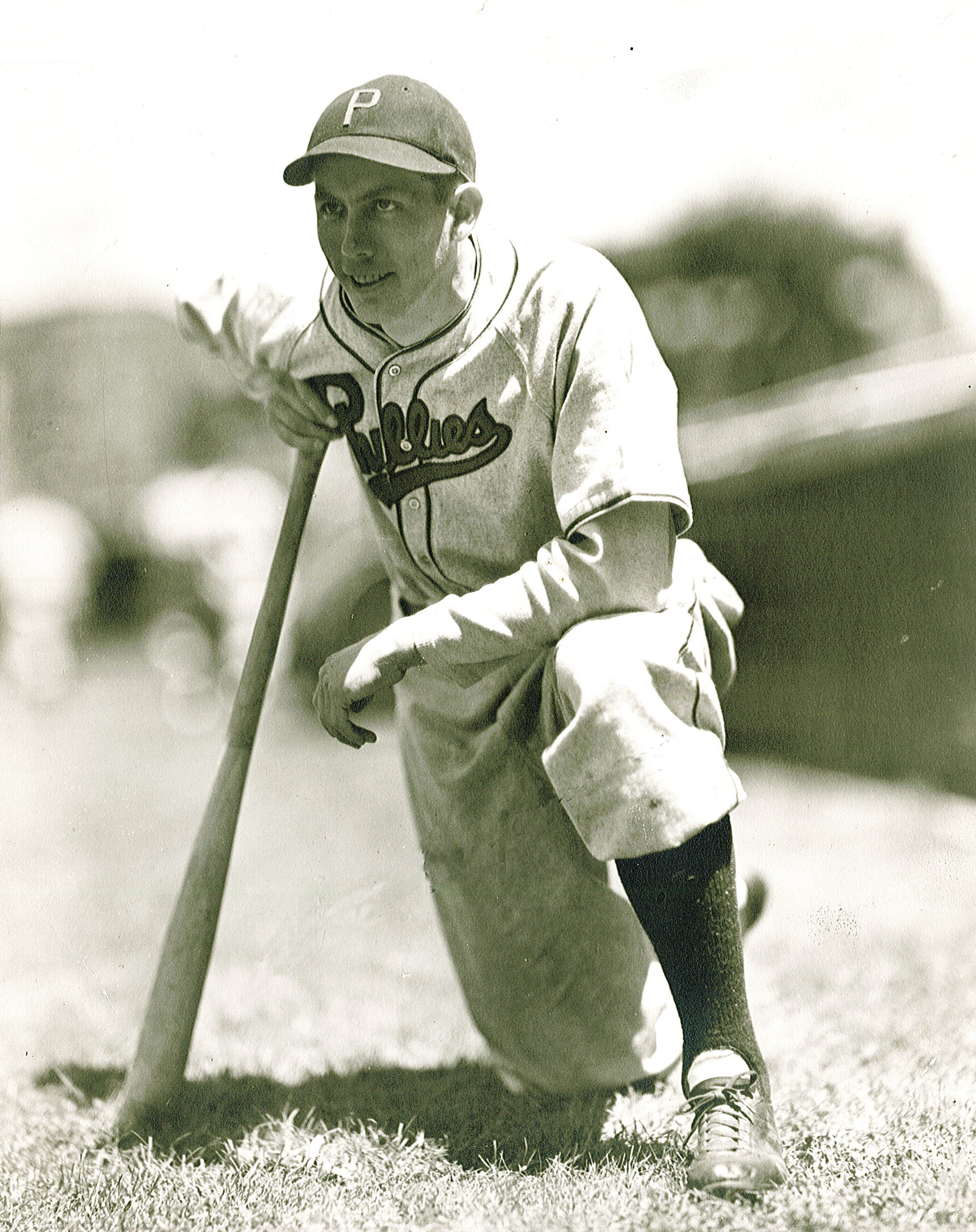
- Stan Benjamin with the Philadelphia Phillies
- Right fielder
- Born: May 20, 1914; Framingham, Massachusetts, U.S.
- Died: December 24, 2009 (aged 95); Harwich, Massachusetts, U.S.
- Batted: Right Threw: Right

MLB debut
- September 16, 1939, for the Philadelphia Phillies

Last MLB appearance
- September 16, 1945, for the Cleveland Indians

MLB statistics
- Batting average: .229
- Home runs: 5
- Runs batted in: 41
- Stats at Baseball Reference

Teams
- Philadelphia Phillies (1939–1942); Cleveland Indians (1945)

Alfred Stanley Benjamin (May 20, 1914 – December 24, 2009) was an American right fielder in Major League Baseball for five seasons; four with the Philadelphia Phillies (1939–42), of the National League (NL), and one with the Cleveland Indians (1945), of the American League (AL). The 6 ft 2 in (1.88 m), 194 lb (88 kg) Benjamin batted and threw right-handed, and was born in Framingham, Massachusetts. After graduating from high school, he attended Western Maryland College, now known as McDaniel College, where he played baseball, basketball, and football.

In addition to his major league playing career, he played in minor league baseball for ten seasons. He began at the age of 23, with the Thomasville Orioles of the Georgia–Florida League in 1937, and finished as the player-manager for the Fresno Cardinals of the California League in 1948. During that time, he played in 955 minor league games, and batted .304, and hit 52 home runs. In the early 1940s, he was an assistant football coach at Northeastern University. Later, during his minor league career, he began coaching high school football, part-time, in his home town of Framingham, and then full-time once his playing and managing career ended.

Starting in 1948, he was the head baseball coach and assistant football coach for Greenfield High School in Greenfield, Massachusetts, and took over the head football coaching duties in 1958. He held both positions, in addition to being a physical education teacher for a local middle school and part-time basketball referee until 1964. In 1965, he was hired as a talent scout for the Houston Astros, a job he held for nearly 40 years. It was his evaluation of Jeff Bagwell that led the Astros to acquire him from the Boston Red Sox for Larry Andersen.

== Early life ==
Born on May 20, 1914, in Framingham, Massachusetts, Benjamin graduated from Framingham High School in 1932, and later attended Western Maryland College, later renamed McDaniel College, on an athletic scholarship. He played football, basketball, and baseball and claimed to have once competed against Ohio State University track star and Olympic gold medalist Jesse Owens. When he was an end on the college's football team, he was presented with the game ball autographed by his teammates after a 12–6 victory over Boston College.

== Career ==
=== Minor leagues ===
Benjamin signed his first professional baseball contract with the Thomasville, Georgia based Thomasville Orioles of the Class D minor league baseball Georgia–Florida League in 1937. He played for this team for the 1937 and 1938 seasons as their third baseman. In 1937, he batted .310, and hit one home run. In 97 games played during the 1938 season, he batted .348, hit 32 doubles, 12 triples, and three home runs. For the 1939 season, he joined the Chattanooga Lookouts of the Class A1 Southern Association as an outfielder; he batted .323, and hit 27 doubles, eight triples, and five home runs in 135 games played. It was at the conclusion of this minor league season, that he became a late-season acquisition of the Philadelphia Phillies.

=== Major leagues ===
Benjamin made his Major League Baseball debut on September 16, 1939, with the Phillies, and appeared in 12 games, fielding a variety of positions, including all three outfield positions, and third base as well. He had 50 at bats that season, and collected seven hits for a .140 batting average.

The next season, he was optioned by the Phillies to the Baltimore Orioles of the Class AA International League, one of their minor league affiliates, as an outfielder. During the 1940 season, he played in 108 games, batted .304, and hit 16 doubles, seven triples, and 11 home runs. At the conclusion of this season, he was a late-season call-up by the Phillies. He played in eight games and had two hits in nine at bats for a .222 batting average.

His most productive major league season came in 1941, when he played a full season with the Phillies. He posted career-highs in home runs (3), RBIs (27), runs scored (47), hits (113), doubles (20), triples (7), stolen bases (17) and games played (129). In a game against the New York Giants on June 28, Benjamin singled to bring home the game-winning run in bottom of the 12th inning. On July 1, he again produced a game-winning single, this time in the bottom of the tenth inning, defeating the Brooklyn Dodgers. He began the 1942 season with the Phillies and batted .224 in 78 games before being sold, on August 5, to the Louisville Colonels, a Class AA American Association affiliate of the Boston Red Sox.

=== Return to the minors ===
Benjamin finished the 1942 season with the Colonels as their third baseman. He appeared in 38 games, hit three home runs, and had a .303 batting average. Before the 1943 season, the Red Sox were in need of more outfielders, so manager Joe Cronin gave Benjamin a tryout in mid-March; however, he was not signed, and he continued to play with the Colonels, moving back to the outfield. In 123 games played, he hit just .237, and did not hit a home run.

He returned to the Baltimore Orioles of the International League for the 1944 season, which had switched its major league affiliation to the Cleveland Indians. He enjoyed a resurgence in his offensive statistics that season, as his batting average rose to .301, and he hit 24 doubles, eight triples, and 12 home runs in 133 games played. The Indians called up Benjamin for the 1945 season, and even though he was part of their regular roster, he appeared in only 14 games, batting .333. On March 26, 1946, he was released by the Cleveland Indians, and he would never appear in another major league game. In his five-season major league career, Benjamin hit .229 with five home runs and 41 RBIs in 241 games.

He played for and managed the Nazareth, Pennsylvania based Nazareth Cement Dusters of the Class D North Atlantic League. He played several different positions that season, including two games at pitcher. He batted .312 and hit four home runs during his only season with the Cement Dusters. Benjamin played for several different teams in 1947, beginning the season with the Houston Buffaloes, a St. Louis Cardinals affiliate, but later joined the San Antonio Missions, a St. Louis Browns affiliate. Both teams were in the Texas League. Late in the season, the Browns promoted him to their Class AAA team, the Toledo Mud Hens of the American Association. In 1948, he played for, and managed, the Fresno Cardinals of the Class C California League, an affiliate of the St. Louis Cardinals. In 125 games played that season, he batted .326 and hit 27 doubles, five triples, and nine home runs. After the season completed, he retired as a player.

== Post-playing career ==
=== High school athletics ===
After his baseball playing career ended, he moved to Greenfield, Massachusetts, and became an assistant football coach at Greenfield High School, while also working as a physical education teacher at a nearby middle school. Benjamin was Greenfield's head football coach from 1958 to 1964, as well as the head baseball coach from 1948 to 1964. He coached the baseball team to several Western Massachusetts championships. Among the other duties, he also refereed high school and college basketball games in New England, as well as working as an assistant football coach at Deerfield Academy in 1964 and 1965. He was also an assistant football coach for Northeastern University in the early 1940s.

=== Scouting career ===
Benjamin began his career as a talent scout for the Houston Astros in 1965, and stayed in that capacity until retiring in 2002. During his time with the Astros franchise he scouted amateur players in the New England region, as well as the American League East teams and their minor league affiliates. He later became the team's scouting supervisor for the Northeast. He also scouted major league teams during spring training in Florida and spent many summer evenings evaluating some of the nation's best college players in the Cape Cod Baseball League.

In 1970, Mike Flanagan was suffering arm problems, and many scouts decided that he did not have a future baseball career, but he could hit well, so Benjamin suggested to the Astros that they could use him in that capacity and wait to see if his arm would recuperate. The Astros drafted Flanagan, but he decided not to sign, and instead attended University of Massachusetts Amherst on a baseball scholarship. During the 1990 season, the Astros were approached by the Boston Red Sox, who needed pitching and were interested in Larry Andersen. Benjamin recommended that they ask for Red Sox minor leaguer Jeff Bagwell in return. The Astros were hesitant initially due to Bagwell's low home run totals, but Benjamin convinced them by explaining that his numbers were deceiving due to the large ballpark that he played in.

== Personal life ==
Benjamin was married to his wife Barbara, maiden name Hall, from 1941 until her death 54 years later in 1995. She was attending Framingham State Teachers College when they met, and school rules forbade female students from getting married or they faced expulsion. Town records did not publish marriages until after January 1, each year, so the couple got married at 1 a.m. on New Year's Day 1941 at her home in Raynham, Massachusetts. This prevented the school from learning about her marriage until after she had graduated. The Benjamins had one son, Richard, and three daughters, Nancy, Janice, and Joanne; as well as 12 grandchildren, and 11 great-grandchildren.

Benjamin died at the age of 95, of heart failure, in his daughter's home on December 24, 2009, in Harwich, Massachusetts. He is interred at Green River Cemetery in Greenfield, Massachusetts.

Benjamin was a member of both the McDaniel College and Massachusetts Baseball Coaches Association hall of fame, and in 2008, he received a special recognition award from the Professional Baseball Scouts Foundation. Tal Smith, Astros' president of baseball operations, said of Benjamin, "Stan's positive evaluation of Bagwell was definitely a catalyst in our taking him... He was a vital cog in our organization who had the ability to convey his opinion in a precise manner. You always knew where you stood with him. He was a longtime employee, but more important, a longtime friend." Smith also called him a "keen judge of talent."
