= Peekskill Highlanders =

- 1946–1949; (1888, 1903, 1905, 1946–1949); Peekskill, New York

Minor league affiliations
- Class: Independent (1888); Class C (1903, 1905); Class D (1946–1949)
- League: Hudson River League (1888, 1903, 1905); North Atlantic League (1946–1949)

Major league affiliations
- Team: New York Giants (1946–1947); St. Louis Browns (1948)

Minor league titles
- League titles (1): 1946
- Conference titles (1): 1946; 1948
- Wild card berths (2): 1947; 1949

Team data
- Name: Peekskill (1888, 1903, 1905); Peekskill Highlanders (1946–1949)
- Ballpark: Peekskill Stadium (1946–1949)

The Peekskill Highlanders were a minor league baseball team based in Peekskill, New York. Early "Peekskill" teams played as members of the Class C level Hudson River League in 1888, 1903 and 1905. The "Highlanders" played as members of the Class D level North Atlantic League from 1946 to 1949. The Peekskill Highlanders hosted home games at Peekskill Stadium and were a minor league affiliate of the New York Giants in 1946 and 1947 and the St. Louis Browns in 1948.

== History ==
=== Hudson River League 1888, 1903, 1905 ===
Peekskill first hosted minor league baseball in 1888, when the "Peekskill" team played the season as a member of the Independent level Hudson River League. The 1888 Hudson River League stopped play on June 7, 1888.

In 1903, Peekskill returned to minor league play with the Peekskill team becoming a member of the Class C level Hudson River League, which reformed after a fifteen–year absence.

On March 25, 1903, and April 1, 1903, meetings were held which resulted in the formation of the Hudson River League for 1903, which began play without a Peekskill team among the six league teams. Peekskill was accepted as a seventh league team on August 2, 1903. Peekskill began league play on August 10, 1903, and the team was given the same record as Poughkeepsie, 21–24. Fred Valentine served as Peekskill manager, as the team ended the 1903 season with an official record of 48–39, placing third in the Hudson River League. Valentine previously served as manager of the semi–professional team in Peekskill. Peekskill had been initially supportive of becoming a 1903 Hudson Valley League member when the league was formed. However, Peekskill realized that playing five to six games a week would require their players to leave more “lucrative positions” in their regular jobs. Peekskill instead played independent exhibition games and Valentine eventually reapplied for admission to the Hudson River League. Peekskill folded from the Hudson River League after the season, having experienced financial difficulties in their brief period of play in the league.

In 1905, Peekskill played a partial season in their final year as a member of the Class C level Hudson River League. On June 1, 1905, Peekskill ended the 1905 season with a record of 5–13 when the Peekskill franchise disbanded. Paddy Burke and Walter Dobbins served as the Peekskill managers in 1905. The Hudson River League played a final season in 1906, without a Peekskill franchise.

=== Highlanders: North Atlantic League 1946 to 1949 ===
Minor league baseball returned to Peekskill in 1946, when the Peekskill "Highlanders" became charter members of the Class D North Atlantic League, playing as an affiliate of the New York Giants. The North Atlantic League featured the Peekskill Highlanders 82–32, Nazareth Cement Dusters 78–40, Stroudsburg Poconos 72–47, Carbondale Pioneers 69–48, Nyack Rockies 67–53, Bloomingdale Troopers 41–78, Mahanoy City Bluebirds 30–79 and Newburgh Hummingbirds/Walden Hummingbirds 27–89.

The Highlanders owner was Lou Baselice of Mount Vernon, New York. Baselice was the simultaneous owner of both the Peekskill Highlanders and the Poughkeepsie Chiefs of the Colonial League. It was reported that Baselice would move his best Peekskill players to the Poughkeepsie team.

The Peekskill Highlanders won the 1946 North Atlantic League championship in their first season. The Highlanders ended the 1946 season with a record of 82–32, placing first in the regular season standings, finishing 6.0 games ahead of the second place Nazareth Cement Dusters, playing the season under Manager Tony Ravish. In the playoffs, the Highlanders defeated the Stroudsburg Poconos 4 games to 2 to advance. In the Finals, the Peekskill Highlanders won the championship by defeating the Carbondale Pioneers 4 games to 3. Playing at Peekskill Stadium, season home attendance was 51,200, an average of 898 per home game.

The Highlanders' Tony Napoles pitched to a perfect 18–0 record with a 2.32 ERA in the 1946 regular season. Napoles then had a 4–0 record in the playoffs, for a final record of 22–0.

In their second season of North Atlantic League play, the 1947 Peekskill Highlanders reached the Finals of the North Atlantic League. Remaining as a New York Giants affiliate, Peekskill finished the 1947 regular season with a record of 69–64, placing third in the North Atlantic League standings under player/Manager Al Gardella. In the first round of the playoffs, Peekskill defeated the Kingston Dodgers 4 games to 1. In the North Atlantic League finals, the Carbondale Pioneers beat the Peekskill Highlanders in five games. Season attendance was 23,300, an average of 350.

The 1948 Peekskill Highlanders won the North Atlantic League pennant under returning player/Manager Al Gardella. Playing as a St. Louis Browns affiliate, the Highlanders advanced to the league finals for the third consecutive season. Peekskill ended the 1948 regular season with a record of 84–49, placing first in the North Atlantic League and 2.0 games ahead of the second place Carbondale Pioneers. In the 1948 Playoffs, Peekskill defeated the Bloomingdale Troopers 4 games to 3. In the finals, Carbondale swept the Highlanders in four games. Home season attendance was 42,023, an average of 632.

The Peekskill Highlanders played their final North Atlantic League season in 1949, advancing to the Finals for the fourth consecutive season. The Highlanders ended the 1949 regular season with a record of 64–75, placing fourth in the North Atlantic League standings with Al Gardella again serving as manager. In the first round of the four-team playoffs, the Highlanders defeated the Lebanon Chix 4 games to 1. In the finals, the Stroudsburg Poconos defeated the Peekskill Highlanders in six games. Stroudsburg had finished the regular season with a 101–36 record and are listed among The National Baseball Association's top 100 minor league teams. The final season of play at Peekskill stadium saw total attendance of 27,300 an average of 393. Peekskill folded after the 1949 season. The North Atlantic League itself folded after the 1950 season.

Peekskill has not fielded another minor league team.

In July, 2012, former Peekskill players and fans gathered for a 3–day reunion event at the Peekskill Museum, celebrating minor league baseball in Peekskill.

Today, Peekskill hosts a team in the amateur Hudson Valley Collegiate Baseball League.

== The ballpark ==
From 1946 to 1949 the Peekskill Highlanders hosted minor league home games at Peekskill Stadium. The stadium had a capacity of 3,700. The original Peekskill Stadium was torn down and the site is a retail area today. The ballpark was located on Grant Avenue between East Main & Park Streets in Peekskill, New York. Today, a new "Peekskill Stadium," which opened in 2004, hosts baseball. The new ballpark is located at 30 Louisa Street in Peekskill, New York.

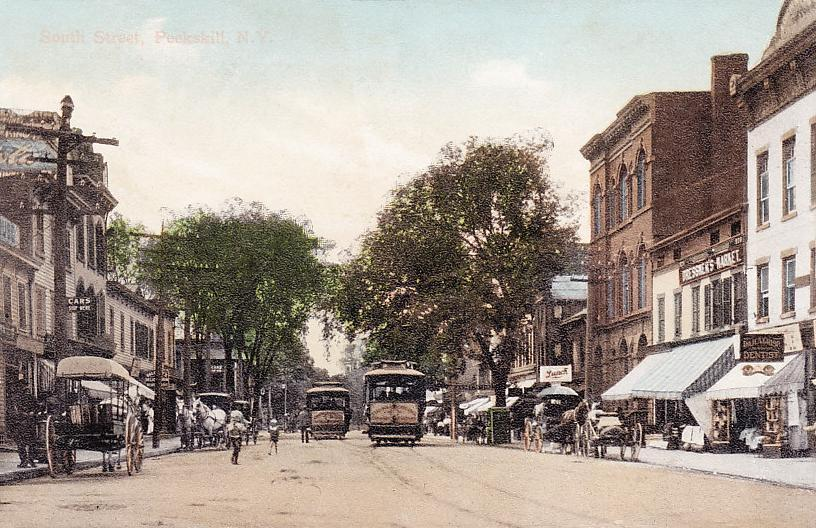
(1908) South Street, Peekskill, New York

== Timeline ==
Year(s)	# Yrs.	Team	Level	League	Affiliate
1888	1	Peekskill	Independent	Hudson River League	None
1903	1	Peekskill	Class C	Hudson River League	None
1905	1	Peekskill	Class C	Hudson River League	None
1946–1947	2	Peekskill Highlanders	Class D	North Atlantic League	New York Giants
1948	1	Peekskill Highlanders	Class D	North Atlantic League	St. Louis Browns
1949	1	Peekskill Highlanders	Class D	North Atlantic League	None

== Year–by–year records ==
Year	Record	Finish	Manager	Playoffs/Notes
1888	0–0	NA	Unknown	League folded June 7, 1888
1903	48–39	3rd	Fred Valentine	No playoffs held
1905	5–13	7th	Paddy Burke / Walter Dobbins	Folded June 1, 1905
1946	82–32	1st	Tony Ravish	League champions
1947	69–64	3rd	Al Gardella	Lost in Finals
1948	84–49	1st	Al Gardella	Lost in Finals
1949	64–75	4th	Al Gardella	Lost in Finals

== Notable alumni ==
- Pidge Browne (1949)
- Al Gardella (1946, 1947–1949, MGR)
- Joe Lake (1905)

== See also ==
- Peekskill Highlanders players
