= Lock Haven (disambiguation) =

Lock Haven is a city in Pennsylvania.

Lock Haven may also refer to:

- Commonwealth University-Lock Haven, formerly Lock Haven University of Pennsylvania
- Lock Haven Bald Eagles, college sports teams
- Lock Haven Maroons, minor league baseball team

== See also ==
- Lockhaven, Illinois, U.S. unincorporated community
