= Dan Carnevale =

American baseball player, manager, and scout

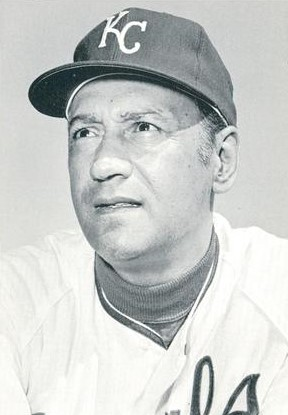
- Coach
- Born: February 8, 1918; Buffalo, New York
- Died: December 29, 2005 (aged 87); Tonawanda, New York
- Batted: Right Threw: Right
- Stats at Baseball Reference

Teams
- Kansas City Royals (1970)

Daniel Joseph Carnevale (February 8, 1918 – December 29, 2005) was an American professional baseball shortstop, second baseman, manager, coach, and scout. Born in Buffalo, New York, Carnevale threw and batted right-handed, stood 6 feet 2 inches (1.88 m) tall and weighed 175 pounds (79 kg). Carnevale also played professional basketball for one season in the National Basketball League for the Buffalo Bisons.

== Biography ==
A cousin of former Major League Baseball infielder Sibby Sisti, Carnevale was a three-sport (baseball, football and basketball) star at Buffalo's St. Joseph's Collegiate Institute for high school and attended Canisius College. He served in the United States Army from August 31, 1943, to February 14, 1946. He deployed to the European theatre during World War II and attained the rank of master sergeant.

== Minor league player ==
Carnevale spent his entire playing and managing career in minor league baseball. A shortstop, he signed with his hometown Buffalo Bisons (who shared the same name with the basketball team) and hit .354 with 11 home runs and 11 triples in his first professional season, 1937, spent with the Class C Perth-Cornwall Bisons, a Buffalo farm team in the Canadian–American League. Although he had two trials with Buffalo (in 1938 and 1940), Carnevale batted only .220 in 185 games with the International League Bisons and played much of his active career (1937–1943; 1946–1953) in the middle rungs of the minors.

Overall, Carnevale batted .284 in 1,570 minor league games, with 80 home runs. In 1947 and 1948, as the playing manager of Class D farm clubs of the Philadelphia Phillies, he batted .380 and .373 in successive seasons; during the latter season, he led the North Atlantic League in home runs and batting, and won the league championship.

== Minor league manager ==
Carnevale began as a manager in 1947, while he was still playing, with the Rock Hill Chiefs. He joined the Phillies' organization in 1948, and he promptly led the Carbondale Pioneers to a league championship — his first of four titles in a row. He next managed the Bradford Blue Wings in 1949, the Terre Haute Phillies in 1950 and the Wilmington Blue Rocks in 1951, leading each of them to a league championship. In 1952, he was at the helm of the Schenectady Blue Jays, and led them to the playoffs, though they lost in the first round. He then switched to the Detroit Tigers' system and managed the Jamestown Falcons in 1953, winning a league championship — his fifth title in six years, and the final one of his managing career. He led the Wilkes-Barre Barons to the 1954 Eastern League playoffs, but lost in the first round. In 1955, he managed his hometown Bisons. He also continued his playing career through 1953.

After becoming a minor league executive and then Major League scout, Carnevale had three other managing assignments as an in-season replacement, with the 1962 Binghamton Triplets, taking over from Granny Hamner, the 1963 Portland Beavers, replacing Les Peden, and the 1972 Beavers, taking the helm from Clay Bryant.

Overall, Carnevale spent 12 seasons managing in the minors, leading 11 different teams. He led teams to the playoffs seven consecutive times and turned five of those playoff appearances into league championship victories.

== Major League scouting career ==
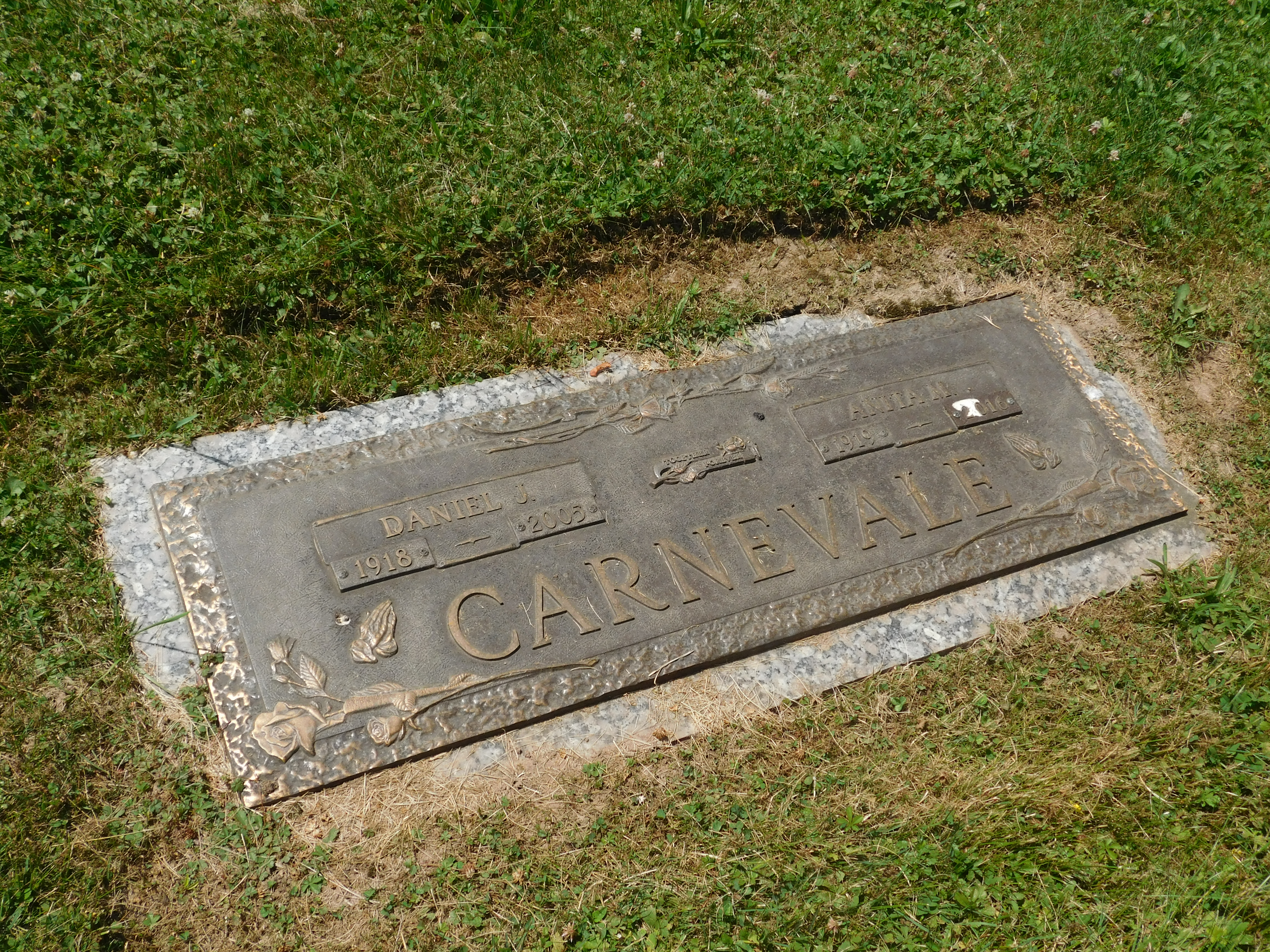
Carnevale's grave at Forest Lawn Cemetery in Buffalo, New York

His only campaign in an MLB uniform came when he was a coach for the 1970 Kansas City Royals, where he served on the staff of Charlie Metro, who had worked with Carnevale in the Detroit organization.

But Carnevale was a longtime scout for four Major League teams — the Royals, Kansas City / Oakland Athletics, Baltimore Orioles and Cleveland Indians — and spent 63 years in professional baseball before his 2001 retirement. As a former player, manager and general manager of the Triple-A Bisons of the International League, he is a member of the Buffalo Baseball Hall of Fame and the Greater Buffalo Sports Hall of Fame.

Dan Carnevale died in North Tonawanda, New York, at age 87 after a brief illness on December 29, 2005.
