= Mickey Micelotta =

American baseball player (1928–2022)

- Shortstop
- Born: October 20, 1928; Corona, New York
- Died: October 9, 2022 (aged 93); Henderson, Nevada
- Batted: Right Threw: Right

MLB debut
- April 20, 1954, for the Philadelphia Phillies

Last MLB appearance
- August 2, 1955, for the Philadelphia Phillies

MLB statistics
- Batting average: .000
- Plate appearances: 9
- Stats at Baseball Reference

Teams
- Philadelphia Phillies (1954–1955)

Robert Peter "Mickey" Micelotta (October 20, 1928 – October 9, 2022) was an American shortstop in Major League Baseball (MLB). He played 13 total seasons of professional baseball, two of which were spent in the National League with the Philadelphia Phillies. In 17 career MLB games, Micelotta posted a batting average of .000 and had two runs in nine plate appearances.

Born and raised in New York, Micelotta first played professionally with the Dayton Indians and Carbondale Pioneers in 1947. Over the next three seasons, he played for various minor league teams in the Phillies organization before missing the 1951 and 1952 seasons, serving in the Korean War. He returned and played for the Terre Haute Phillies in 1953 and the Syracuse Chiefs from 1954 to 1955, splitting time between the Chiefs and the Phillies' major league squad. Micelotta spent the next three seasons with the Miami Marlins and three seasons after that with the Birmingham Barons before retiring from baseball.

== Early baseball career ==
Born in Corona, New York, Micelotta made his professional debut in 1947 at the age of 18 and played for two different teams that year. He played in 40 games for the Dayton Indians of the Ohio State League and in 25 games for the Carbondale Pioneers of the North Atlantic League. Micelotta spent the 1948 season with two teams in the Philadelphia Phillies minor league system. He spent 58 games with the Bradford Blue Wings of the New York–Penn League and 60 games with the Dover Phillies of the Eastern Shore League, both D-class teams. In 1949, Micelotta was promoted to the C-class Vandergrift Pioneers of the Middle Atlantic League; in 129 games for the Pioneers, he hit .287 and hit a then-career high seven triples.

Micelotta moved to the Schenectady Blue Jays of the Canadian–American League the following season, where he had a three-hit game against the Gloversville-Johnstown Glovers, which the Blue Jays won, 8–7. Micelotta finished the season with a .257 batting average in 133 games. He missed the 1951 and 1952 seasons as a result of serving in the United States Army during the Korean War. Micelotta returned to baseball in 1953, and played for the Terre Haute Phillies of the Illinois–Indiana–Iowa League. In 115 games for them, he had a .297 batting average and 15 home runs. After the season ended, the Philadelphia Phillies purchased his contract, adding him to their roster for the upcoming season.

== Major league career ==
As the 1954 season began, the Phillies noted that Micelotta had a good chance at winning a major league roster spot due to manager Steve O'Neill being impressed with his fielding and hitting power. His performance during spring training was regarded highly, and he was noted on a list of promising rookies throughout the majors. Micelotta made the roster for the 1954 Phillies and made his major league debut on April 20. Micelotta played in 13 games for the Phillies that year, served primarily as a pinch runner, and scored two runs in three total at-bats. In June, he was demoted to the Syracuse Chiefs of the International League, where he finished the season. In 95 games for the Chiefs, Micelotta hada .229 batting average and 38 runs batted in.

Micelotta remained on the Phillies' 40-man roster to start the 1955 season, but near the end of spring training, the Phillies chose to send him and three others to Syracuse for the season. He spent the first three months of the season with the Chiefs, then was called back up to the Phillies due to both Granny Hamner and Roy Smalley Jr. getting injured. He played in four games during his time with the club, going hitless in four at-bats and playing his final major league game on August 2. After Hamner and Smalley returned from the disabled list, Micelotta was sent back to Syracuse, where he finished out the year. In 127 games for Syracuse in 1955, Micelotta had a .244 batting average and a career-high nine triples.

== Later baseball career ==
Micelotta was still considered a promising prospect in 1956, and spent spring training trying to fight his way back on the roster. By the end of March, with a couple of weeks to go until the season began, he was noted as playing very well, and the Phillies were considering keeping him on the major league roster for the season. He ended up not making the team, and spent the season with the Miami Marlins. During his time with Miami in 1956, Micelotta was known for his defensive plays at the shortstop position, making three good ones in a 6–1 loss against the Havana Cubans in late May. He finished the season with a .236 batting average and 12 home runs in 146 games.

Due to Micelotta's "very mediocre" hitting and being unable to help the Phillies as a result, he remained with Miami for the 1957 season. He, Woody Smith, Bobby Young, and Pancho Herrera were considered to be one of the best infields in the International League, with one writer saying, "they make plays the Phillies couldn't make." Micelotta finished the year with a .216 batting average in 143 games. He again played a full season with Miami in 1958 after spending the offseason playing in the Dominican Winter League. His performances that season included a triple late in a game against the Richmond Virginians to win it, 3–2, and a walk-off home run against the Montreal Royals to win that game, 2–1. He finished the season with a .201 batting average in 127 games played.

After the season ended, Micelotta was released from the Marlins, and he joined the Birmingham Barons, a Detroit Tigers affiliate in the Southern Association, where he spent the final three seasons of his professional career. In 1959, Micelotta played in all 154 games for Birmingham and had a batting average of .239, as well as career highs in stolen bases (10) and strikeouts (117). The following season, Micelotta was named to the Southern Association All-Star Team alongside fellow Barons Stan Palys and Ron Nischwitz. He finished the season with a .253 batting average in 150 games and career highs in home runs (20) and runs batted in (87).

Micelotta's comeback season in 1960 resulted in the Detroit Tigers bringing him into spring training as someone who could serve as a utility infielder on the major league roster. After spending March with the Tigers, he was sent back to Birmingham, where he spent the 1961 season. In a match against the Atlanta Crackers, Micelotta had three runs batted in as Birmingham won, 11–2. He finished his final season of professional baseball with a .237 batting average, seven home runs, and 55 runs batted in in 112 games while splitting time between shortstop and third base.

== Later life and death ==
After retiring from baseball, Micelotta worked in the carpet business in New York, then later moved to Greenacres, Florida. Micelotta died in Henderson, Nevada on October 9, 2022, at the age of 93.
