= Colburn Park =

Ballpark in Newark, New York, US

- Interactive map of Colburn Park
- Location: Newark, New York, US
- Coordinates: 43°02′52″N 77°04′27″W

Construction
- Opened: 1968

Tenants
- Newark Co-Pilots (NYPL) (1968–1979); Newark Orioles (NYPL) (1983–1987); Newark Barge Bandits (NAL) (1995–1996); Newark Raptors (NYCBL) (1998–2005); Newark Pilots (PGCBL) (2011–present)

Colburn Park is a ballpark located in Newark, New York, US. It is home to the Newark Pilots (2011–present) of the Perfect Game Collegiate Baseball League and was the home for the Newark Co-Pilots (1968–1979) and Newark Orioles (1983–1987) of the New York–Penn League, the Newark Barge Bandits (1995–1996) of the North Atlantic League and the Newark Raptors (1998–2005) of the New York Collegiate Baseball League. It opened in 1968 and seats 2,000 people.
