= Aldinger =

Aldinger is a surname. Notable people with the surname include:

- Albert K. Aldinger (1873–1957), American football, basketball, and baseball player and coach
- Fritz Aldinger (born 1941), German materials scientist
- Heinz Aldinger (1933–2024), German football referee
- Herbert Aldinger (born 1943), American author
- William F. Aldinger III (born 1947), American businessman
