= Hazleton Mountaineers (baseball) =

- 1928–1950; Hazleton, Pennsylvania

Minor league affiliations
- Previous classes: Class D (1949–1950); Class B (1940); Class C (1939); Class A (1933–1938); Class B (1929–1932); Class D (1928)
- League: North Atlantic League (1949–1950); Interstate League (1939–1940); Eastern League (1938); New York–Pennsylvania League (1929–1932, 1934–1937); Anthracite League (1928)

Team data
- Previous names: Hazleton Dodgers (1950); Hazleton Mountaineers (1939–1940, 1949); Hazleton Red Sox (1937–1938); Hazleton Mountaineers (1928–1932, 1934–1936)
- Previous parks: Cranberry Ballpark

The Hazleton Mountaineers were an American minor league baseball franchise in the first half of the 20th century which represented Hazleton, Pennsylvania.

"Mountaineers" was the most-used name by the Hazleton team (1928–1932; 1934–1936; 1939–1940; 1949); the team was also known as the Red Sox (1937–1938) and the Dodgers (1950), reflecting their Major League parent teams' identities. Hazleton competed in the New York–Pennsylvania League of 1923–1937; its successor, the Eastern League (1938); the Interstate League of 1939–1952; and the North Atlantic League of 1946–1950. The team played at Cranberry Ballpark.

== Team history ==
The 1929 team was formed June 16 when the Syracuse Stars moved to Hazleton on an emergency basis when their stadium, Star Park, fell down. The Hazleton franchise competed in the New York–Penn League through 1932, was inactive in 1933, then was revived the following season as a NY-PL farm system affiliate of the Philadelphia Phillies. It would be affiliated with the Phillies (1934–1936), Boston Red Sox (1937–1938), and Brooklyn Dodgers (1950).

The 1938 Hazleton Red Sox finished second during the regular season and made it to the finals of the Eastern League playoffs, but drew only 45,000 fans. Boston moved its affiliation to Scranton for 1939 and Hazleton's Eastern League club transferred to Springfield, Massachusetts. Hazleton then fielded teams in lower classification leagues from 1939 to June 12, 1940, and in 1949–1950.

A professional basketball team took the Hazleton Mountaineers moniker and competed in early incarnations of the Continental Basketball Association between 1946 and 1952.

== Notable alumni ==
- Morrie Arnovich
- Jim Bagby, Jr.
- Johnny Barrett
- Al Brazle
- Joe Glenn
- Vern Kennedy
- Norm Larker
