= Newark Co-Pilots =

- 1968–1979; (1968–1979); Newark, New York

Minor league affiliations
- Previous classes: Short-Season A
- League: New York–Penn League

Major league affiliations
- Previous teams: Milwaukee Brewers (1970–1978); Seattle Pilots (1968–1969)

Minor league titles
- League titles: 1 (1975)

Team data
- Previous names: Newark Co-Pilots (1968–1979)
- Previous parks: Colburn Park

The Newark Co-Pilots were a minor league baseball team based in Newark, New York that played in the New York–Penn League from 1968 to 1979. They were affiliated with the Seattle Pilots from 1968 to 1969 and with the Milwaukee Brewers from 1970 to 1978. They were independent in 1979. Their home ballpark was Colburn Park.

== Notable alumni ==
=== Hall of Fame alumni ===
- Robin Yount (1973) Inducted, 1999

=== Notable alumni ===
- Kevin Bass (1977) MLB All-Star
- Bill Castro (1971)
- Frank DiPino (1977)
- George Frazier (1976)
- Jim Gantner (1974) MLB All-Star
- Moose Haas (1974)
- Doug Jones (1978) 5 x MLB All-Star
- Tom Kelly (1968) 1991 AL Manager of the Year; Manager: 2 x World Series Champion Minnesota Twins (1987, 1991)
- Dave LaPoint (1977)
- Sixto Lezcano (1971)
- Charlie Moore (1971)
- Lary Sorensen (1976) MLB All-Star
- Earl Torgeson (1969)

== Year-by-year record ==
Year	Record	Finish	Manager	Playoffs
1968	38-36	4th	Sibby Sisti	Lost in 1st round
1969	42-34	3rd	Earl Torgeson	none
1970	36-33	4th	Sandy Johnson	none
1971	35-35	4th	Al Widmar	none
1972	23-46	7th	Sandy Johnson	none
1973	15-55	8th	Matt Galante	none
1974	30-36	5th	John Felske	none
1975	47-20	1st	Tony Roig	League Champs
1976	46-24	2nd	Tony Roig	none
1977	43-29	4th	Dennis Holmberg	
1978	26-46	5th (Wrigley)	Ken Richardson	
1979	32-39	4th (Wrigley)	Mal Fichman	
