= Lock Haven Maroons =

- 1897–1898; Lock Haven, Pennsylvania

Minor league affiliations
- Class: Class F (1897)
- League: Central Pennsylvania League (1897-1898)

Major league affiliations
- Team: None

Minor league titles
- League titles (0): None

Team data
- Name: Lock Haven Maroons (1897-1898)
- Ballpark: Unknown (1897-1898)

The Lock Haven Maroons were a short–lived minor league baseball team based in Lock Haven, Pennsylvania. In 1897, the Maroons began play as members of the Central Pennsylvania League when the Shamokin Reds team moved to Lock Haven during the season. The Maroons finished the season by placing second in the final standings.

== History ==
Lock Haven hosted a semi-professional team in the 1884 season. The team played seventeen games against the Williamsport, Pennsylvania team during their season. Three of the Lock Haven-Williamsport games were halted after the seventh inning due to disputes on the field and in the stands.

In the 1897 season, the Shamokin Reds team began the season playing as members of the reformed six–team Class F level Central Pennsylvania League. The Reds would relocate during the season. Shamokin joined the Bloomsburg Blue Jays, Milton, Pottsville, Sunbury Railroaders and Williamsport Demorest teams in beginning league play on May 15, 1887.

On June 26, 1897, the Shamokin Reds, also referred to as the "Coal Barons," moved to Lock Haven with a 13–17 record. The team finished the season playing as the Lock Haven "Maroons."

The "Maroons" nickname was likely tied to the color of the team's uniforms, common in the era.

In 1897 Central Pennsylvania League play, the Shamokin/Lock Haven team ended the season with an overall record of 45–48, after compiling a 32–31 record while based in Lock Haven. Managed by Jacob Herrold and C.H. Myers, the Maroons placed second in the final overall standings, finishing 14.0 games behind the first place Milton team. Shamokin/Lock Haven tied with the Bloomsburg Blue Jays (44–47) for second place. The league held no playoffs.

Future major league players Frank Gatins, Red Owens, Tom Poorman, Lew Ritter and Bill Rotes played for the 1897 Lock Haven Maroons.

The Central Pennsylvania League became a four–team independent league in the 1898 season, with the Lock Haven Maroons continuing play. Standings and team statistics of the 1898 Central Pennsylvania League are unknown. Victor Currier managed the Maroons in 1898 and the team had John Hinton and Connie McGeehan on the roster.

The Central Pennsylvania League did not return to play in 1899. Lock Haven, Pennsylvania has not hosted another minor league team.

== The ballpark ==
The name and location of the Lock Haven Maroons' home minor league ballpark is unknown. Lock Haven University of Pennsylvania was founded in 1870 and had available facilities in the era.

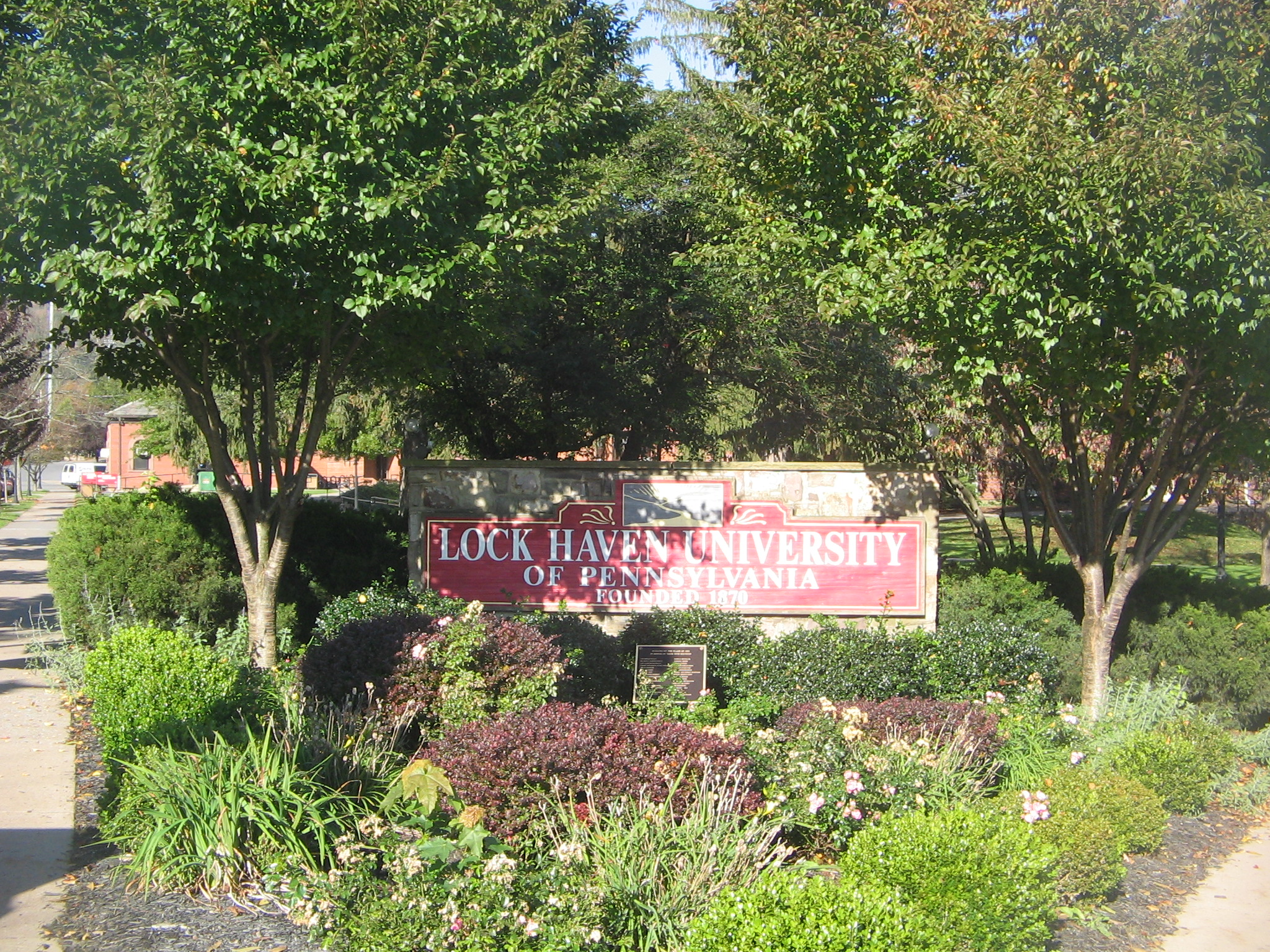
Lock Haven University Sign

== Year–by–year records ==
Year	Record	Finish	Manager	Playoffs/notes
1897	45–48	2nd (tie)	Jacob Herrold / C.H. Myers	Shamokin (13–17) moved to Lock Haven June 26; No playoffs held
1898	00–00	N/A	Victor Currier	1898 league standings unknown

== Notable alumni ==
- Frank Gatins (1897)
- John Hinton (1898)
- Connie McGeehan (1898)
- Red Owens (1897)
- Tom Poorman (1897)
- Lew Ritter (1897)
- Bill Rotes (1897)

== See also ==
Lockhaven Maroons players
