= Anthracite League (baseball) =

- Classification: Class D (1928)
- Sport: Minor League Baseball
- First season: 1928
- Folded: 1928
- President: Unknown (1928)
- No. of teams: 6
- Country: United States of America
- Last champion: Unknown

The Anthracite League was a six–team Class D level baseball minor league that played in the 1928 season. The Anthracite League featured franchises based exclusively in Pennsylvania. The Anthracite League permanently folded after the 1928 season.

== History ==
The Anthracite League formed as Class D level minor league in 1928.

Previously, a minor league football league of the same Anthracite League name played in the region in 1924.

The baseball Anthracite League began play in the 1928 season as a six–team league. The Anthracite League charter franchises were the teams from Hazleton, Pennsylvania (Hazleton Mountaineers), Mahanoy City, Pennsylvania (Mahanoy), Mount Carmel, Pennsylvania (Mount Carmel), Shamokin, Pennsylvania (Shamokin Indians), Shenandoah, Pennsylvania (Shenandoah Braves) and Tamaqua, Pennsylvania (Tamaqua).

The Anthracite League was formed for only the 1928 season. Reports are that the league did not complete the scheduled season. 1928 League standings, rosters and statistics are unknown. The league permanently folded after the 1928 season.

== Anthracite League teams ==
| Team name(s) | City represented | Ballpark | Year(s) active |
|---|---|---|---|
| Hazleton Mountaineers | Hazleton, Pennsylvania | Unknown | 1928 |
| Mahanoy City | Mahanoy City, Pennsylvania | Unknown | 1928 |
| Mount Carmel | Mount Carmel, Pennsylvania | Unknown | 1928 |
| Shamokin Indians | Shamokin, Pennsylvania | Unknown | 1928 |
| Shenandoah Braves | Shenandoah, Pennsylvania | Unknown | 1928 |
| Tamaqua | Tamaqua, Pennsylvania | Unknown | 1928 |

== Anthracite League overall standings ==
The 1928 Anthracite League standings are unknown.

== Notable alumni ==
Tod Sloan Shenandoah Braves
