= Joe Campini =

American baseball player (1920–2001)

- Catcher
- Born: May 11, 1920; East Wareham, Massachusetts, U.S.
- Died: May 21, 2001 (aged 81); Providence, Rhode Island, U.S.
- Batted: Left Threw: Right

Negro league baseball debut
- 1948, for the Baltimore Elite Giants

Last appearance
- 1948, for the Baltimore Elite Giants
- Stats at Baseball Reference

Teams
- Baltimore Elite Giants (1948)

Joseph Lewis Campinha (May 11, 1920 – May 21, 2001), also known as Joe Campini, was a Cape Verdean-American Negro league catcher in the 1940s. He is believed to be the first professional baseball player of Cape Verdean descent.

A native of East Wareham, Massachusetts of Cape Verdean descent, Campinha played under the name "Campini" for the Baltimore Elite Giants in 1948. A backup for the team's regular catcher Frazier Robinson, Campinha managed a hit and a walk in two plate appearances in his one recorded game for Baltimore, which may have come in April at Bugle Field against the Homestead Grays. Following his stint with Baltimore, Campinha played minor league baseball with the Bangor Pickers in 1949, and the Watertown Athletics in 1950, his final season in professional baseball. Campinha went on to serve in the United States Merchant Marine, and died in Providence, Rhode Island in 2001 at age 81.
