= Pen Argyl (baseball) =

- 1907; Pen Argyl, Pennsylvania

Minor league affiliations
- Class: Independent (1907)
- League: Blue Mountain League (1907)

Major league affiliations
- Team: None

Minor league titles
- League titles (0): None

Team data
- Name: Pen Argyl (1907)
- Ballpark: "Pen Argyl Baseball Stadium" (1907)

The Pen Argyl team was a minor league baseball team based in Pen Argyl, Pennsylvania in 1907. Pen Argyl played as members of the Independent level Blue Mountain League. The 1907 team was without a known moniker and was the only minor league team known to be hosted in Pen Argyl.

== History ==
The Pen Argyl team was formed and began play in the 1907 Blue Mountain League. The league was an Independent four team league. The other charter teams were the teams from Bangor, Pennsylvania, Nazareth, Pennsylvania and Stroudsburg, Pennsylvania. The final 1907 Blue Mountain League team records and standings are unknown.

The State Belt and Hay lines provided free transportation for the league teams to travel to away games.

Pen Argyl's record and statistics are unknown. A printed postcard of the 1907 Nazareth team identifies them as the "pennant winners" of the Blue Mountain League.

The Blue Mountain League permanently folded after the 1907 season and Pen Argyl, Pennsylvania has not hosted another minor league team.

== The ballpark ==
The exact name of the Pen Argyl home ballpark is not directly referenced. A printed photo postcard from 1907 features a photograph of the ballpark, with fans in attendance, labeled as the Pen Argl Baseball Stadium.

== Timeline ==
Year(s)	# Yrs.	Team	Level	League
1907	1	Pen Argyl	Independent	Blue Mountain League

== Year–by–year records ==
The 1907 Pen Argyl record is unknown, as no official Blue Mountain League records or final standings are known.

== Notable alumni ==
- No players for the 1907 Pen Argyl team reached the major leagues.
