= Bill Burich =

American baseball player (1917-2009)

- Shortstop
- Born: May 29, 1918; Calumet, Michigan, U.S.
- Died: December 25, 2009 (aged 91); Apple Valley, California, U.S.
- Batted: Right Threw: Right

MLB debut
- April 15, 1942, for the Philadelphia Phillies

Last MLB appearance
- June 10, 1946, for the Philadelphia Phillies

MLB statistics
- Batting average: .284
- Home runs: 0
- Runs batted in: 7
- Stats at Baseball Reference

Teams
- Philadelphia Phillies (1942, 1946)

William Max Burich (May 29, 1917 – December 25, 2009) was an American infielder in Major League Baseball, playing mainly as a shortstop for the Philadelphia Phillies during the 1942 and 1946 seasons. Listed at 6' 0", 180 lb., he batted and threw right-handed.

A native of Calumet, Michigan, Burich was one of many major leaguers who saw his baseball career interrupted by a military stint during World War II. In 1942 he appeared in 25 games as a backup infielder for Pinky May, Bobby Bragan and Danny Murtaugh. He enlisted in the United States Army in 1943, serving for three and half years before rejoining the Phillies in the 1946 midseason.

In a two-season career, Burich was .284 hitter (23-for-81) in 27 games with four runs and seven RBI in 27 games, including one double, two stolen bases, and a .333 on-base percentage.

Following his brief stint in major leagues, Burich resumed his playing career in the minors and also managed the 1948 Nazareth Barons of the North Atlantic League.

Burich died on December 25, 2009, in Apple Valley, California.
