= Newark Orioles =

- 1983–1987; Newark, New York

Minor league affiliations
- Class: Short Season A (1983–1987)
- League: New York–Penn League (1983–1987)

Major league affiliations
- Team: Baltimore Orioles (1983–1987)

Minor league titles
- League titles: none
- Division titles: 1983; 1984

Team data
- Name: Newark Orioles (1983–1987)
- Ballpark: Colburn Park (1983–1987)

The Newark Orioles were a baseball team, who played in the New York–Penn League from 1983 to 1987. They played their home games at Colburn Park in Newark, New York.

Steve Finley played with the Newark Orioles in 1987.
