= Newark Barge Bandits =

- 1995–1996; Newark, New York

Minor league affiliations
- Class: Independent (1995–1996)
- League: North Atlantic League (1995–1996)

Minor league titles
- Pennants (1): 1995

Team data
- Name: Newark Barge Bandits (1995–1996)
- Ballpark: Colburn Park (1995–1996)

The Newark Barge Bandits were a North Atlantic Baseball League baseball team that played from 1995 to 1996. They went 37-21 in their first year of existence, winning the league pennant. In 1996, they went 38-35. They played their home games at Colburn Park.

Major league player Kiko Garcia played for them. Pitcher Germaine Hunter was drafted by the Boston Red Sox. Catcher Rob Zachmann was drafted by the Seattle Mariners.
