= Carbondale Pioneers =

- 1946–1950; (1895–1896, 1946–1950); Carbondale, Pennsylvania

Minor league affiliations
- Class: Class B (1895–1896); Class D (1946–1950)
- League: Pennsylvania State League (1895–1896); North Atlantic League (1946–1950)

Major league affiliations
- Team: Philadelphia Phillies (1947–1950)

Minor league titles
- League titles (2): 1947; 1948

Team data
- Name: Carbondale Anthracites (1895–1896); Carbondale Pioneer Blues (1949); Carbondale Pioneers (1946–1950)
- Ballpark: Russell Park (1946–1950)

The Carbondale Pioneers were a minor league baseball team based in Carbondale, Pennsylvania. Between 1895 and 1950, Carbondale teams played as members of the Pennsylvania State League in 1895 and 1896 and North Atlantic League from 1946 to 1950. The Carbondale Pioneers were a minor league affiliate of the Philadelphia Phillies from 1947 to 1950, winning league championships in 1947 and 1948. The Pioneers hosted minor league home games at Russell Park.

== History ==
=== Pennsylvania State League 1895–1896 ===
Carbondale, Pennsylvania first hosted minor league baseball in 1895, when the Carbondale Anthracites became members of the Class B level Pennsylvania State League. In their first season of play, the Anthracites placed second in the Pennsylvania State League with a record of 55–48, finishing 5.0 games behind first place Hazelton Barons in the final standings. The 1895 Carbondale manager was Martin Swift. After being fined $100.00 and suspended from the nearby Scranton Coal Heavers team of the Eastern League for going into the stands during a game, Pat Luby joined Carbondale mid–season over the initial objections of the Scranton franchise. Scranton eventually released Luby from his contract and he played two seasons with Carbondale.

In their second season of play, Carbondale continued play, as the 1886 Pennsylvania State League folded mid-season. On July 11, 1896, the Carbondale Anthracites had a record of 26–15 when the Pennsylvania State League folded. Pat Luby had a 9–3 pitching record while hitting .391 in the 19 games. The Carbondale franchise had consolidated with the Pottsville Lambs franchise on June 20, 1896 before the league folded.

=== North Atlantic League 1946–1950 ===
Minor league baseball returned to Carbondale in 1946. The new Carbondale franchise was formed when the "Carbondale Baseball Association" accepted the invitation for Carbondale to field a franchise in the new Class D level North Atlantic League. Subsequently, meetings were held in Room 3 of the Miners & Mechanics building in Carbondale. The meetings resulted in a future affiliation agreement with the Philadelphia Phillies and the franchise structure details were concluded. After the conclusion of World War II, 28 new minor leagues were formed in 1946.

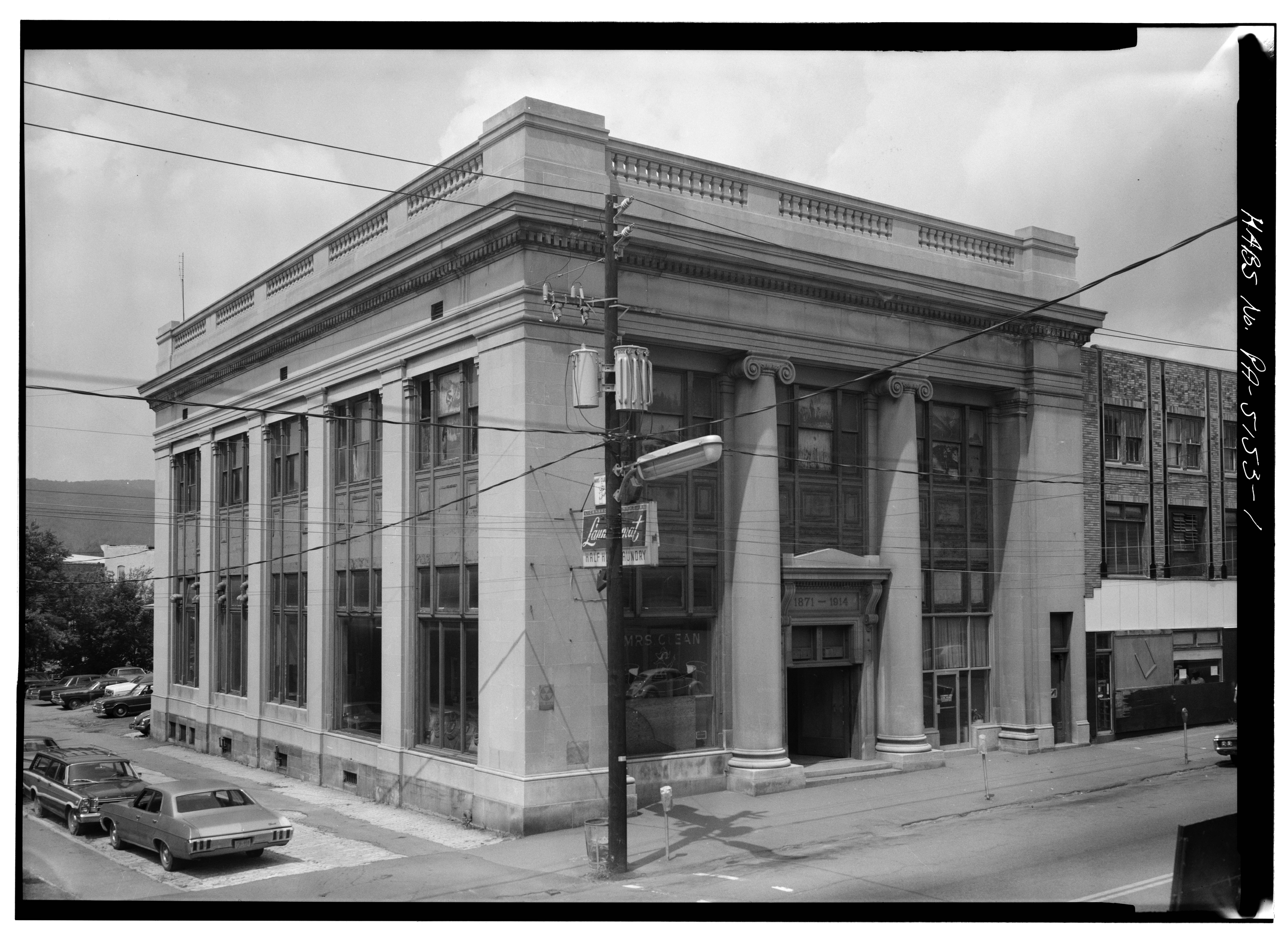
Miners and Mechanics Bank Building, 13 North Main Street, Carbondale, Lackawanna County, Pennsylvania

The Carbondale "Pioneers" became charter members of the Class D level North Atlantic League. The 1946 North Atlantic League standings featured the Peekskill Highlanders 82–32, Nazareth Cement Dusters 78–40, Stroudsburg Poconos 72–47, Carbondale Pioneers 69–48, Nyack Rockies 67–53, Bloomingdale Troopers 41–78, Mahanoy City Bluebirds 30–79 and Newburgh Hummingbirds/Walden Hummingbirds 27–89.

The Pioneers opened their season on May 8, 1946, playing at Stroudsburg. The game was called with two outs in the top of the eighth inning because of darkness. The Carbondale Pioneers made the North Atlantic League Finals in their first season of play in the North Atlantic League. The Pioneers played as an Independent co–op team their first year, before the Phillies affiliation officially began. The Pioneers ended the 1946 season with a 69–48 record, placing fourth in the standings, playing under manager Pat Colgan. In the first round of the playoffs, the Carbondale Pioneers defeated the Nazareth Cement Dusters four games to one to advance. In the Finals, the Peekskill Highlanders defeated Carbondale in a seven-game series. Beginning play at Russell Park, Carbondale had total home attendance of 62,617, an average of 1,070 per home game. Walter Forwood hit .406 with 43 doubles for the Pioneers.

After moving to Carbondale to manage and play, manager Pat Coglan had a career in baseball, but remained a resident of Carbondale, living in the same home with his wife and family and remaining active in the community until his death in 1992.

The 1947 Carbondale Pioneers were North Atlantic League Champions. The Carbondale Pioneers officially became a Philadelphia Phillies affiliate, beginning a four–year association. Pat Colgan again served as manager as Carbondale placed second in the regular season with a record of 77–52, finishing behind the first place Kingston Dodgers in the regular season standings. In the 1947 playoffs, the Pioneers defeated the Mahanoy City Bluebirds four games to three and advanced. In the Finals, Carbondale captured the championship by defeating the Peekskill Highlanders four games to one. 1947 season attendance at Russell Park was 85,500, an average of 1,326 per home contest.

In 1948, the Carbondale Pioneers repeated as North Atlantic League Champions. Ending the 1948 season with a record of 80–49, the Pioneers placed second in the regular season standings, finishing 2.0 games behind the first place Peekskill Highlanders. Under player/Manager Danny Carnevale, the Pioneers qualified for the playoffs after Carnevale led the league in batting average (.380) and home runs (20). Carbondale won in first round of the playoffs, defeating the Mahanoy City Brewers four games to three to advance. Carbondale then swept the Peekskill Highlanders in four games to win consecutive championships. At Russell Park, the per game attendance was 1,294, with a total of 83,485.

Some references have the 1949 Carbondale team playing under a slightly changed moniker in 1949, playing as the interchangeable "Pioneer Blues." Carbondale continued as a Philadelphia Phillies affiliate, placing fifth with a record of 63–76. Managed by Barney Lutz, Carbondale finished 39.0 games behind the 101-35 Stroudsburg Poconos and did not qualify for the four–team playoffs. Playing at Russell Park, Carbondale had season attendance of 28,000, an average of 403.

In their final season of play, the Carbondale Pioneers placed third in the North Atlantic League regular season standings and qualified for the playoffs. The Pioneers ended the 1950 season with a record of 76–55, finishing 10.0 games behind the first place Lebanon Chix. Playing under Manager Joe Glenn, in the playoffs, Lebanon defeated the Carbondale Pioneers 4 games to 3 to end their season. In the final season at Russell Park, overall attendance was 37,548, an average of 573.

The North Atlantic League permanently folded after the 1950 season. Carbondale, Pennsylvania has not hosted another minor league team since the Pioneers folded.

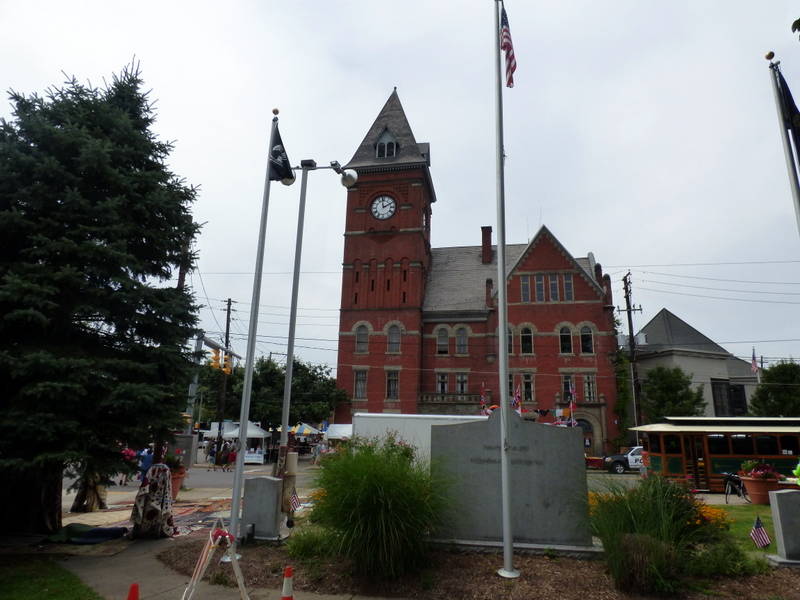
(2012) Carbondale City Hall. National Register of Historic Places. Carbondale, Pennsylvania

== The ballpark ==
The Carbondale Pioneers played minor league home games at Russell Park. Today, Russell Park is still in use as a public park with a baseball field. The park is located at 1112 Russell Street in Carbondale, Pennsylvania.

== Timeline ==
Year(s)	# Yrs.	Team	Level	League	Affiliate	Ballpark
1895–1896	2	Carbondale Anthracites	Class B	Pennsylvania State League	None	Russell Park
1946	1	Carbondale Pioneers	Class D	North Atlantic League	None	Russell Park
1947–1950	4	Carbondale Pioneers	Class D	North Atlantic League	Philadelphia Phillies	Russell Park

== Year–by–year records ==
Year	Record	Finish	Manager	Playoffs/notes
1895	55–48	2nd	Martin Swift	No playoffs held
1896	26–15	3rd	NA	League folded July 11
1946	69–48	4th	Pat Coglan	Lost in finals
1947	77–52	2nd	Pat Coglan	League champions
1948	80–49	2nd	Danny Carnevale	League champions
1949	63–76	5th	Barney Lutz	Did not qualify
1950	76–55	3rd	Joe Glenn	Lost in playoffs

== Notable alumni ==
- Bobby Cargo (1896)
- Dan Carnevale (1948, MGR)
- Jack Fee (1895)
- Hilly Flitcraft (1947)
- Joe Glenn (1950, MGR)
- Pat Luby (1895–1896)
- Barney Lutz (1949, MGR)
- Bill Massey (baseball) (1895–1896)
- Mart McQuaid (1895–1896)
- Mickey Micelotta (1947)
- Ron Mrozinski (1949)
- Stan Palys (1950)
- Jack Rafter (1896)
- Ed Sales (1895–1896)
- Curt Welch (1895)
- Hal Woodeshick (1950)
- Stan Yerkes (1895)

== See also ==
- Carbondale Pioneers players
- Carbondale Anthracites players
