= Blue Mountain League =

- Classification: Independent (1907)
- Sport: Minor League Baseball
- First season: 1907
- Folded: 1907
- Director: Joshua Price (1907)
- President: Unknown (1907)
- No. of teams: 4
- Country: United States of America
- Most titles: 1 Nazareth* (1907)
- Related competitions: Pennsylvania League

The Blue Mountain League was a minor league baseball league that played in the 1907 season. The four–team Independentlevel Blue Mountain League consisted of franchises based exclusively in Pennsylvania. The Blue Mountain League permanently folded following one season of play.

== History ==
The Blue Mountain League formed and began play in the 1907 season as an Independent level minor league. The four charter teams were the teams from Bangor, Pennsylvania, Nazareth, Pennsylvania, Pen Argyl, Pennsylvania and Stroudsburg, Pennsylvania. The final 1907 team records and standings are unknown.

The league secretary was Joshua Price of Bangor, Pennsylvania. The Nazareth manager was Williams. The State Belt and Hay lines provided free transportation for the teams to travel. There was early concern because Nazareth had only signed six players when the other teams' rosters were complete.

A printed postcard of the 1907 Nazareth team identifies them as the "pennant winners" of the Blue Mountain League.

The Blue Mountain League permanently folded after the 1907 season.

== Blue Mountain League teams ==
| Team name | City represented | Ballpark | Year(s) active |
|---|---|---|---|
| Bangor | Bangor, Pennsylvania | Unknown | 1907 |
| Nazareth | Nazareth, Pennsylvania | Unknown | 1907 |
| Pen Argyl | Pen Argyl, Pennsylvania | Unknown | 1907 |
| Stroudsburg | Stroudsburg, Pennsylvania | Unknown | 1907 |

== 1907 Blue Mountain League overall standings ==
The statistics, standings and records of the 1907 Blue Mountain League are unknown. A printed postcard of the 1907 Nazareth team identifies the team as the pennant winners of the Blue Mountain League.

== Notable alumni ==
- Ed Fitzpatrick (1907), Nazareth
- Jack Stansbury (1907), Nazareth
- Fred Stem (1907), Stroudsburg
