= Bobby Young =

American baseball player (1925–1985)

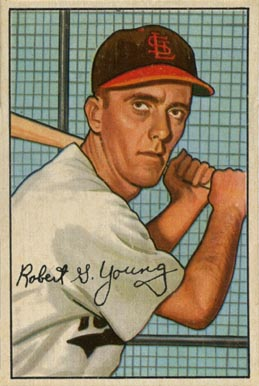
- Second baseman
- Born: January 22, 1925; Granite, Maryland, U.S.
- Died: February 4, 1985 (aged 60); Baltimore, Maryland, U.S.
- Batted: Left Threw: Right

MLB debut
- August 30, 1948, for the St. Louis Cardinals

Last MLB appearance
- September 28, 1958, for the Philadelphia Phillies

MLB statistics
- Batting average: .249
- Home runs: 15
- Runs batted in: 137
- Stats at Baseball Reference

Teams
- St. Louis Cardinals (1948); St. Louis Browns/Baltimore Orioles (1951–1955); Cleveland Indians (1955–1956); Philadelphia Phillies (1958)

Robert George Young (January 22, 1925 – February 4, 1985) was an American professional baseball player. He played all or part of eight years in Major League Baseball, primarily as a second baseman. He played most of his career for the St. Louis Browns/Baltimore Orioles franchise.

Born in Granite, Maryland, he was first signed by the St. Louis Cardinals before the 1946 season, and appeared in three games for them in 1948 before being traded to the crosstown Browns in June 1949. He was the Browns' regular second baseman from 1951 to 1953, tying for the American League lead in double plays as a 1951 rookie with 118, and leading the league again in 1952 with 127.

He continued as the starting second baseman after the team relocated to Baltimore before the 1954 season, and was in fact the first player signed to a contract that year. But the move closer to his hometown did not produce strong results, and his batting average – which had hovered around the .250 mark – slipped to .245 in 1954 and to .199 in early 1955, leading to his trade to the Cleveland Indians in June. He played only 18 games for Cleveland over the rest of the season, and one game in 1955; his contract was sold to the Philadelphia Phillies in June 1957, and he appeared in 32 games for the Phillies in 1958, ending his career. Young batted .249 with 15 home runs and 137 runs batted in in 687 career games. Defensively, he recorded a .980 fielding percentage.

In 1953, Young was invited to join Jackie Robinson's fall barnstorming tour. In previous years, the tour had included only African American major leaguers, who faced off against Negro league stars. Young, Gil Hodges, Ralph Branca and Al Rosen joined the groundbreaking interracial tour of the South, which began in Baltimore and concluded in Houston. Rosen was injured early on and returned home but the other three White players continued. In Birmingham, where an ordinance forbade racial mixing in athletic events, they were forced to sit in the stands or risk arrest.

Young spent part of 1957 with the Miami Marlins of the International League, where he, Woody Smith, Mickey Micelotta, and Pancho Herrera were considered to be one of the best infields in the International League, with one writer saying, "they make plays the Phillies couldn't make."

He died of a heart attack at age 60 in Baltimore.
