= Sandy Johnson (baseball) =

Sanfrid DeForest Johnson (born October 24, 1940) is an American professional baseball scout and player development executive. Johnson spent the 2009 season as vice president, scouting, of the New York Mets of Major League Baseball. He also is the brother of former Major League infielder, coach and manager Tim Johnson.

During his playing career, Sandy Johnson spent seven seasons (1959–62; 1964–66) in the Pittsburgh Pirates' organization as a second baseman, third baseman and shortstop. He batted .254 in 768 games and never rose above the Class A level. Johnson threw and batted right-handed, stood 6 feet (1.83 m) tall and weighed 165 pounds (75 kg).

He was a minor league manager in the Milwaukee Brewers' farm system from 1970 to 1972, then became a Milwaukee scout in 1973. The following year, he switched to the Major League Baseball Scouting Bureau, where he was the East Coast supervisor through 1981. He then assumed high-level scouting and player development positions for the San Diego Padres (director of scouting, 1982–84); Texas Rangers (assistant general manager/scouting and player development, 1985–95; special assistant to the general manager, 1996); and Arizona Diamondbacks (special assistant to the general manager, 1997–98; assistant GM, 1999–2003; vice president and senior assistant GM, 2004).

In 2005 Johnson joined the Mets as assistant general manager and was promoted to vice president, scouting, on December 6, 2006.
