= Mahanoy City Brewers =

- 1887–1950; (1887–1888, 1928, 1946–1950); Mahanoy City, Pennsylvania

Minor league affiliations
- Class: Class D (1928, 1946–1950); Independent (1887–1888)
- League: Central Pennsylvania League (1887–1888); Anthracite League (1928); North Atlantic League (1946–1950)

Major league affiliations
- Team: Boston Braves (1946)

Minor league titles
- League titles (0): None

Team data
- Name: Mahanoy City (1887–1888, 1928); Mahanoy City Bluebirds (1946–1947); Mahanoy City Brewers (1948–1950)
- Ballpark: East End Memorial Stadium (1946–1950)

The Mahanoy City Brewers was the final and primary moniker of the minor league baseball teams based in Mahanoy City, Pennsylvania, between 1887 and 1950. Mahanoy City teams played as members of the Central Pennsylvania League (1887–1888), Anthracite League (1924) and North Atlantic League (1946–1950). Mahanoy City was an affiliate of the Boston Braves in 1946.

== History ==
Mahanoy City first had minor league baseball in 1887. Mahanoy City fielded a team in the Independent level Central Pennsylvania League, finishing in 7th place in the eight–team league. Mahanoy City finished the 1887 season with a record of 16–28 under manager James Quirk.

In their second season, Mahanoy City finished in 4th place in the Central Pennsylvania League. After finishing with a record of 24–26, playing the season under manager Amos Walbridge, Mahanoy City folded with the rest of the Central Pennsylvania League after the 1888 season.

After a 40 season hiatus, Mahanoy City returned to minor league play as the 1928. The team played as members of the Class D level Anthracite League. The Anthracite League final standings, records and statistics are unknown.

Minor league baseball returned to Mahanoy City in 1946. The Mahanoy City Bluebirds became charter members of the Class D level North Atlantic League as an affiliate of the Boston Braves. The Bluebirds finished 7th in the North Atlantic League regular season standings with a record of 30–79, playing under managers Buck Boyle and Charles Dugan. The North Atlantic League standings featured the Peekskill Highlanders 82–32, Nazareth Cement Dusters 78–40, Stroudsburg Poconos 72–47, Carbondale Pioneers 69–48, Nyack Rocklands 67–53, Bloomingdale Troopers 41–78, Mahanoy City Bluebirds 30–79 and Newburgh Hummingbirds/Walden Hummingbirds 27–89. Beginning play at East End Memorial Stadium, Mahanoy City had home season attendance of 19,261, an average of 353 per game.

The Mahanoy Bluebirds continued play in the 1947 North Atlantic League qualifying for the playoffs. In the regular season, the Bluebirds finished with a 67–65 record. Finishing in 4th place under manager Buck Etchison, Mahanoy City was defeated in the Playoffs by the Carbondale Pioneers 4 games to 3. Season attendance at East End Memorial Stadium was 51,000, an average of 773.

The team became the Mahanoy City "Brewers" in 1948. The Brewers finished 4th in the North Atlantic League regular season. After a record of 79–54 under returning Manager Buck Etchison, the Brewers were defeated again by the Carbondale Pioneers in the Playoffs, 4 games to 3. At East End Memorial Stadium, 1948 season attendance was 53,052.

In 1949, the Mahanoy City Brewers qualified for the playoffs for the third consecutive season. During the North Atlantic League regular season, the Brewers finished with a record of 71–63 losses, 3rd in the league, playing under Manager Michael Koons. In the 1949 Playoffs, the Stroudsburg Poconos defeated Mahanoy City 4 games to 3. Season home attendance for 1949 was 35,000.

The Mahanoy City Brewers played their final season in the 1950 North Atlantic League. Finishing with a season with a record of 48–88, the Brewers placed 7th in the regular season under managers Joseph Santomauro and Richard Dresser. In their final season at East End Memorial Stadium, the Brewers drew 14,550, an average of 214 per game. The North Atlantic League folded after the 1950 season. Mahanoy City has not fielded another minor league team.

== The ballpark ==
From 1946 to 1950, Mahanoy City teams were noted to have hosted minor league home games at East End Memorial Stadium. The ballpark had a capacity of 3,000 in 1950. Also known as "East End Park," the ballpark was located at 32 East Center Street, Mahanoy, Pennsylvania. Today, retail business occupies the site.

== Year–by–year records ==
Year	Record	Finish	Manager	Playoffs/Notes
1887	16–28	7th	James Quirk	No playoffs held
1888	24–26	4th	Amos Walbridge	No playoffs held
1928	00-00	NA	NA	League stats unknown
1946	30–79	7th	Buck Boyle / Charlie Dugan	Did not qualify
1947	67–65	4th	Buck Etchison	Lost in 1st round
1948	79–74	4th	Buck Etchison	Lost in 1st round
1949	71–26	3rd	Michael Koonst	Lost in 1st round
1950	48–88	7th	Joe Santomauro / Richard Dresser	Did not qualify

== Notable alumni ==
- Jake Drauby (1887–1888)
- Buck Etchison (1947–1948, MGR)
- Charlie Gessner (1887)
- Tom Gettinger (1888)
- Art McCoy (1887)
- Barney McLaughlin (1887)
- Bob Rinker (1948)

=== See also ===
Mahanoy City Bluebirds players
Mahanoy City Brewers players
