= Jimmy Dee =

American baseball player (1864–1897)

- Shortstop
- Born: December 27, 1864; Safe Harbor, Pennsylvania, U.S.
- Died: August 28, 1897 (aged 32); Lake Michigan, U.S.
- Batted: Unknown Threw: Unknown

MLB debut
- July 30, 1884, for the Pittsburgh Alleghenys

Last MLB appearance
- August 16, 1884, for the Pittsburgh Alleghenys

MLB statistics
- Batting average: .125
- Home runs: 0
- Runs batted in: 0

Teams
- Pittsburgh Alleghenys (1884)

James D. Dee (Note: Although many sources list his nickname as being Jim, he does not appear to have been referred to as such in his lifetime, with newspapers calling him either James or Jimmy.) (December 27, 1864 – August 28, 1897) was an American Major League Baseball player who played shortstop for the 1884 Pittsburgh Alleghenys. He continued to play in the minor leagues through 1888, and played for the Travelers Base Ball and Sporting Club, with whom he'd begun his career, until 1891. After disappearing from his family in 1897, he was discovered to have been buried alive in the cargo hold of the steamship Owego, suffocated by several tons of grain funneled into the hold.
