= Al Gardella =

American baseball player (1918-2006)

- First baseman
- Born: January 11, 1918; New York City, U.S.
- Died: September 10, 2006 (aged 88); Coral Springs, Florida, U.S.
- Batted: Left Threw: Left

MLB debut
- May 17, 1945, for the New York Giants

Last MLB appearance
- July 4, 1945, for the New York Giants

MLB statistics
- Batting average: .077
- Home runs: 0
- Runs batted in: 1
- Stats at Baseball Reference

Teams
- New York Giants (1945)

Alfred Stephen Gardella (January 11, 1918 – September 10, 2006) was an American professional baseball player. He was a first baseman for one season (1945) with the New York Giants. For his career, he compiled a .077 batting average in 26 at-bats, with one run batted in.

He was born in New York City and died in Coral Springs, Florida at the age of 88.
