= Albert K. Aldinger =

American athlete and coach (1873–1957)

Biographical details
- Born: July 4, 1873; York, Pennsylvania, U.S.
- Died: October 18, 1957 (aged 84); Wisconsin, U.S.
- Education: Vermont

Playing career

Baseball
- 1897: Bloomsburg Blue Jays
- 1899: Albany Senators
- 1899: Oswego Grays
- 1900: Oswego Pioneers
- 1900: Elmira
- 1905: Burlington

Coaching career (HC unless noted)

Football
- 1894–1905: Bloomsburg

Basketball
- 1901–1905: Bloomsburg

Head coaching record
- Overall: 50–25–3 (football); 19–11 (basketball)

Albert Kerwin "Doc" Aldinger (July 4, 1873 – October 18, 1957) was an American football, basketball and baseball player and coach. He served as the head men's basketball coach at Bloomsburg University of Pennsylvania from 1901 to 1905.
