= George Wetzel =

American baseball player (1865–1903)

- Pitcher
- Born: 1865; Philadelphia, Pennsylvania, U.S.
- Died: November 25, 1903; Philadelphia, Pennsylvania, U.S.
- Batted: Unknown Threw: Unknown

MLB debut
- August 26, 1885, for the Baltimore Orioles

Last MLB appearance
- September 2, 1885, for the Baltimore Orioles

MLB statistics
- Win–loss record: 0–2
- Earned run average: 8.47
- Strikeouts: 6
- Stats at Baseball Reference

Teams
- Baltimore Orioles (1885)

George B. Wetzel (1865 – November 25, 1903) was an American professional baseball pitcher who started two games for the Baltimore Orioles in 1885.

Wetzel made his major league debut on August 26, 1885, and appeared in his final game on September 2. He went 0–2 in the two games he started, allowing 27 hits in 17 innings of work, walking 9 and striking out 6. He allowed 26 runs, 16 of which were earned, giving him an 8.47 earned run average.
