= Red Owens (baseball) =

American baseball player (1874–1952)

- Second baseman
- Born: November 1, 1874; Pottsville, Pennsylvania, U.S.
- Died: August 20, 1952 (aged 77); Harrisburg, Pennsylvania, U.S.
- Batted: Right Threw: Right

MLB debut
- July 28, 1899, for the Philadelphia Phillies

Last MLB appearance
- May 31, 1905, for the Brooklyn Superbas

MLB statistics
- Batting average: .196
- Home runs: 1
- Runs batted in: 21
- Stats at Baseball Reference

Teams
- Philadelphia Phillies (1899); Brooklyn Superbas (1905)

Thomas Llewellyn "Red" Owens (November 1, 1874 – August 20, 1952) was an American professional baseball player. He played parts of two seasons in Major League Baseball for the 1899 Philadelphia Phillies and 1905 Brooklyn Superbas, primarily as a second baseman. His minor league baseball career spanned 19 seasons, from 1896 until 1914.
