= Bill Rotes =

American baseball player (1871–1934)

- Pitcher
- Born: June 27, 1871; Pottstown, Pennsylvania, U.S.
- Died: March 7, 1934 (aged 62); Pottstown, Pennsylvania, U.S.
- Batted: Unknown Threw: Unknown

MLB debut
- June 14, 1893, for the Louisville Colonels

Last MLB appearance
- August 15, 1893, for the Louisville Colonels

MLB statistics
- Win–loss record: 5–12
- Earned run average: 7.60
- Strikeouts: 22
- Stats at Baseball Reference

Teams
- Louisville Colonels (1893)

William Clarence Rotes (June 27, 1871 – March 7, 1934) was an American professional baseball pitcher. Rotes played for the Louisville Colonels during the 1893 season. He also played in the minor leagues from 1892 to 1898.

Rotes was commonly known as "Bill" and "Poodle". His last name was sometimes spelled "Rhodes" or "Rhoads".
