= Charlie Gessner =

American baseball player (1863–1922)

- Pitcher
- Born: December 1863; Philadelphia, Pennsylvania, U.S.
- Died: May 25, 1922 (aged 58); Washington, D.C., U.S.
- Batted: Unknown Threw: Unknown

MLB debut
- July 19, 1886, for the Philadelphia Athletics

Last MLB appearance
- July 19, 1886, for the Philadelphia Athletics

MLB statistics
- Win–loss record: 0–1
- Earned run average: 9.00
- Strikeouts: 0
- Stats at Baseball Reference

Teams
- Philadelphia Athletics (1886)

Charles R. Gessner (December 1863 – May 25, 1922) was an American professional baseball player who played pitcher in the Major Leagues for the 1886 Philadelphia Athletics of the American Association.

He later played for Monmouth (Central Interstate (minor) League) in 1889.
