= J. B. Young =

American baseball player (1857–1938)

- Pitcher
- Born: June 10, 1857; Pottsville, Pennsylvania, U.S.
- Died: April 6, 1938 (aged 80); Shamokin, Pennsylvania, U.S.
- Batted: Unknown Threw: Unknown

MLB debut
- June 10, 1892, for the St. Louis Browns

Last MLB appearance
- June 10, 1892, for the St. Louis Browns

MLB statistics
- Win–loss record: 0–0
- Earned run average: 22.50
- Strikeouts: 1
- Stats at Baseball Reference

Teams
- St. Louis Browns (1892)

Joseph Bartholomew Young (June 10, 1857 – April 6, 1938) was an American professional baseball pitcher. He appeared in one game in Major League Baseball for the St. Louis Browns on June 10, 1892, his 35th birthday.

He was born in Pottsville, Pennsylvania and died in Shamokin, Pennsylvania of stomach cancer in 1938.
