= North Atlantic League =

- Classification: Class D (1946–1950); Independent (1995–1996)
- Sport: Minor League Baseball
- First season: 1946
- Folded: 1996
- President: Ernest C. Landgraf (1946–1950); Edward Broidy (1995–1996)
- No. of teams: 13
- Country: United States
- Most titles: 2 Carbondale Pioneers (1947–1948)
- Related competitions: Northeast League

The North Atlantic League was the name of two minor baseball leagues. The first was a Class D affiliated system that operated from 1946 until 1950, and the second was an independent minor league that played from 1995 until 1996. Three of that league's franchises joined the Northeast League after the folding of the North Atlantic League.

Many ballplayers with major league experience played in the league, including Tom Marsh, Carl Sawatski, Bill Burich and Lonnie Goldstein, among others.

== List of teams ==
=== 1946–1950 ===
- Bangor, PA: Bangor Pickers 1949; Bangor Bangors 1950
- Berwick, PA: Berwick Slaters 1950
- Bloomingdale, NJ: Bloomingdale Troopers 1946–1948
- Carbondale, PA: Carbondale Pioneers 1946–1948, 1950; Carbondale Pioneer Blues 1949
- Hazleton, PA: Hazleton Mountaineers 1949; Hazleton Dodgers 1950
- Kingston, NY: Kingston Dodgers 1947
- Lansdale, PA: Lansdale Dukes 1948
- Lebanon, PA: Lebanon Chix 1949–1950
- Mahanoy City, PA: Mahanoy City Bluebirds 1946–1947; Mahanoy City Brewers 1948–1950
- Nazareth, PA: Nazareth Cement Dusters 1946; Nazareth Tigers 1947; Nazareth Barons 1948–1950
- Newburgh, NY: Newburgh Hummingbirds 1946
- Nyack, NY: Nyack Rockies 1946–1948
- Peekskill, NY: Peekskill Highlanders 1946–1949
- Stroudsburg, PA: Stroudsburg Poconos 1946–1950
- Walden, NY: Walden Hummingbirds 1946

=== 1995–1996 ===
- Altoona, PA: Altoona Rail Kings 1996
- Lynn, MA: Massachusetts Mad Dogs 1996
- Mountaindale, NY: Catskill Cougars 1996
- Nashua, NH: Nashua Hawks 1995–1996
- Newark, NY: Newark Barge Bandits 1995–1996
- Niagara Falls, NY: Niagara Falls Mallards 1995
- Welland, ON: Welland Aqua-Ducks 1995–1996

=== 1946–1950 ===
- 1946 – Peekskill Highlanders
  - Playoffs: Peekskill 4, Stroudsburg 2
    Carbondale 4, Nazareth 1
  - Finals: Peekskill 4, Carbondale 3
- 1947 – Kingston Dodgers
  - Playoffs: Peekskill 4, Kingston 1
    Carbondale 4, Mahanoy City 3
  - Finals: Carbondale 4, Peekskill
- 1948 – Peekskill Highlanders
  - Playoffs: Peekskill 4, Bloomingdale 3
    Carbondale 4, Mahanoy City 3
  - Finals: Carbondale 4, Peekskill 0
- 1949 – Stroudsburg Poconos
  - Playoffs: Stroudsburg 4, Mahanoy City 3
    Peekskill 4, Lebanon 1
  - Finals: Stroudsburg, Peekskill 2
- 1950 – Lebanon Chix
  - Playoffs: Lebanon 4, Carbondale 3
    Stroudsburg 4, Hazleton 3
  - Finals: Lebanon 3, Stroudsburg 2
    Series was stopped by bad weather

=== 1995–1996 ===
==== League Championship titles ====
- 1995 – Newark Barge Bandits
  - Non-Playoff Schedule
- 1996 – Massachusetts Mad Dogs
  - Playoff: Catskill 2, Massachusetts 0
