= Hazleton Mountaineers =

Former professional basketball team

Hazleton Mountaineers

Founded
1946
League
EPBL 1946-1948, 1951–1952
Arena
Hazleton High School (1946–1948)

Most Precious Blood High School (1951–1952)

Team History
Hazleton Mountaineers
1946-1948

Hazleton Mountaineers
1951-1952

Championships
None
Division titles
None
Head coach
unknown

The Hazleton Mountaineers were one of the original six franchises in the Eastern Professional Basketball League. The Mountaineers were the league's first team to have an integrated roster, as two former members of the New York Rens, Bill Brown and Zack Clayton, joined John Isaacs on the Mountaineers' roster. The franchise folded after the 1947-48 season, and a second Mountaineers team moved from Ashland, Pennsylvania during the 1951-52 season, but folded after losing eight straight games.

== Year-by-Year ==
=== Hazleton Mountaineers, EPBL ===
Year	League	Record	Reg. season	Playoffs
1946/47	EPBL	11-17	4th	Quarterfinals
1947/48	EPBL	18-10	3rd	Finals

=== Hazleton Mountaineers (from Ashland Greens) ===
Year	League	Record	Reg. season	Playoffs
1951/52	EPBL	6-24 (0-8 as Hazleton) (forfeited last seven games)	6th	did not qualify
