= Newburgh Hummingbirds =

The Newburgh Hummingbirds were a North Atlantic League baseball team based in Newburgh, New York, United States that played for part of the 1946 season.

== History ==
The Hummingbirds were charter members of the North Atlantic League, a Class D circuit which was one of many minor leagues to pop up after the end of World War II. However, the Birds seemed cursed from the start: the club had difficulty finding a home field, finally signing an agreement with Delano-Hitch Stadium (then called Recreation Park) just a week before opening day. Former Yankees third baseman Joe Dugan was offered the manager's job, but he turned Newburgh down; the position went to Frank Novosel instead.

The season itself started inauspiciously when only 259 fans attended the home opener on May 10; that Rec Park was not an enclosed facility did not encourage fans to buy tickets. Rain cancelled the next two days' games, then team president Leo Groom died suddenly. More rain deluged the Newburgh area, and the Birds didn't play again until May 17: a 4–3 win over Mahanoy City which was called after seven innings due to darkness. It would be the last game the Hummingbirds would ever play in Newburgh.

== On to Walden ==
On May 20, the team's contract at the stadium was cancelled by the city's Recreation Commission, due to nonpayment of rent and the team's failure to install lights at the field. 23-year-old Francis Giegnas, Jr. became the Hummingbirds new president, and he attempted to move his team's games to the Newburgh Free Academy field. But the Board of Education said no, leaving the 'Birds without a home field; on May 23, the franchise became a road team, finally moving to nearby Walden, New York on June 10. The Hummingbirds drew nearly 1,000 fans to their opener in their new home (impressive for a town of just 4,000 people), but it was all downhill from there; Giegnas, unable to pay the team's bills, soon returned the franchise to the NAL.

In July, the league sold the club to former minor-league player Lou Haneles for $1,300 (plus assumption of the team's debts). Under Hanales (who became the Hummingbirds' manager and first baseman as well), attendance didn't get any better, drawing just 145 fans to a Booster's Night on July 12. In August, Hanales looked at moving the team to either Reading, Pennsylvania or Newton, New Jersey and/or signing an affiliation deal with the Brooklyn Dodgers; none of these came to pass. Looking for a fresh start, the club dropped the Hummingbirds name and were renamed the Keen Kutters, after a knife factory in Walden; Hanales also dropped admission prices from 80 to 60 cents. Nothing worked: the club would attract only 10,051 fans the entire season, or less than 200 a game.

== Angry Birds ==
The club, which had a 7-5 mark in Newburgh only to slip to 23-36 by mid-season, completely collapsed after that: they lost 53 of their last 57 games (including their last 19 in a row) to finish the season deep in the NAL cellar at 27-89. (They even lost a pair of games to the Middletown (NY) Legionnaires, a local semi-pro team.) The franchise then shifted to Kingston, New York for the 1947 season; ironically, Kingston was able to get the Dodgers affiliation that had eluded Newburgh the previous year, and the team soared to an 81-48 mark, winning the NAL pennant. Unfortunately, attendance was disappointing: only 32,554 fans came to Kingston games in 1947, fourth-best in the loop but still under 500 a game, and not enough to keep the franchise solvent. Kingston was eliminated in the first round of the league playoffs and never played again, folding over the winter. The league itself disbanded in 1950.

The Hummingbirds did feature one future major-league player: Nick Testa. Testa's stay in the bigs was brief—one inning with no plate appearances with the 1958 San Francisco Giants—but his career in Newburgh was even shorter: the 18-year-old Testa is listed as being on the Hummingbirds roster but apparently never played. He would eventually spend 17 years as a player in pro ball (including one in Japan), followed by many years as a coach.

Delano-Hitch Stadium would be used for various amateur, collegiate, and American Legion baseball teams over the years (including one in the 1980s named the Hum'n'birds, a take on the old pro team's name), but would not see another professional team for a half-century, when the Newburgh Nighthawks came to town in 1995.
