= Bloomingdale Troopers =

- 1946–1948; Bloomingdale, New Jersey

Minor league affiliations
- Previous classes: Class D
- League: North Atlantic League

Major league affiliations
- Previous teams: Boston Braves (1947); Cleveland Indians (1948)

Minor league titles
- League titles: None

Team data
- Previous parks: DeLazier Field

The Bloomingdale Troopers were a North Atlantic League baseball team based in Bloomingdale, New Jersey that played from 1946 to 1948. They were affiliated with the Boston Braves in 1947 and the Cleveland Indians in 1948. They are the only professional baseball team to ever play in Bloomingdale.

== History ==
The Bloomingdale Troopers were one of eight teams that competed in the inaugural 1946 season of the North Atlantic League, formed during the post-World War II minor league baseball boom in the United States. The league and its teams operated as a Class D affiliate of Major League Baseball, however, most of its teams operated independently of any major league clubs during the 1946 season.

The Bloomingdale team was named the "Troopers" after the original owner's son, who was a New Jersey State Police officer killed in the line of duty. They played their first game on May 8, 1946 in Peekskill, New York against the Highlanders, who were managed by former New York Yankees third baseman Joe Dugan. The next day, the Troopers played their first game at DeLazier Field in Bloomingdale, also against the Highlanders.

During the summer of 1946, former New York Yankees player Babe Ruth attended a Troopers game while in the area on a hunting and fishing trip. After the game, Ruth went onto the field and hit a few home runs for the record-setting crowd of 1,467 spectators.

The Troopers drew an average of 600 fans per game. Jim Lemon played for the team during their last season in 1948, before making it to the major leagues for Cleveland in 1950.

== Season records ==
Bloomingdale Troopers
Season	League	Manager	Record	Finish	Playoffs
1946	North Atlantic	Mickey Weintraub	41-78	6th	
1947	North Atlantic	Butch Scinski	47-74	7th	
1948	North Atlantic	Jim Jefferis / Stephen Kuk	77-52	3rd	Lost in 1st round
