= Stroudsburg Poconos =

The Stroudsburg Poconos, located in Stroudsburg, Pennsylvania, were a minor league baseball team that played in the Interstate League in 1932 and in the North Atlantic League from 1946 to 1950. They were affiliated with the New York Yankees in 1947 and the Cleveland Indians in 1949. They played their home games at Gordon Gifels Field. Stroudsburg first played in 1907 as members of the Independent level Blue Mountain League.

They went 19–7 in 1932, before the league folded on June 20, 1932, while the team was leading in the standings. Stroudsburg would not host another team until the reformed North Atlantic League began play in the 1946 season.

The 1949 Stroudsburg Poconos are recognized as one of the 100 greatest minor league teams of all time. They went 101–36 that year.

Following the 1950 season, the North Atlantic League folded and the Stroudsburg Poconos folded as well.

== Year-by-year records ==
Year	Record	Finish	Manager	Playoffs
1932	19-7	1st	Ed Murphy	League disbanded June 20
1946	72-47	3rd	Joe Antolick	Lost first round
1947	57-69	6th	Jack Farmer	Did not qualify
1948	72-59	5th	Frank Radler	Did not qualify
1949	101-36	1st	Frank Radler	League Champs
1950	80-50	2nd	Frank Radler	Finals stopped by weather with Lebanon ahead 3-2
