= 1920 Washington Senators season =

1920 Washington Senators
- League: American League
- Ballpark: Griffith Stadium
- City: Washington, D.C.
- Record: 68–84 (.447)
- League place: 6th
- Owners: Clark Griffith and William Richardson
- Managers: Clark Griffith

The 1920 Washington Senators won 68 games, lost 84, and finished in sixth place in the American League. They were managed by Clark Griffith and played home games at Griffith Stadium.

== Regular season ==
=== Season standings ===
American League
Team	W	L	Pct.	GB	Home	Road
Cleveland Indians	98	56	.636	—	51‍–‍27	47‍–‍29
Chicago White Sox	96	58	.623	2	52‍–‍25	44‍–‍33
New York Yankees	95	59	.617	3	49‍–‍28	46‍–‍31
St. Louis Browns	76	77	.497	21½	40‍–‍38	36‍–‍39
Boston Red Sox	72	81	.471	25½	41‍–‍35	31‍–‍46
Washington Senators	68	84	.447	29	37‍–‍38	31‍–‍46
Detroit Tigers	61	93	.396	37	32‍–‍46	29‍–‍47
Philadelphia Athletics	48	106	.312	50	25‍–‍50	23‍–‍56

=== Record vs. opponents ===
1920 American League record Sources:
Team	BOS	CWS	CLE	DET	NYY	PHA	SLB	WSH
Boston	—	12–10	6–16	13–9	9–13	13–9–1	9–13	10–11
Chicago	10–12	—	10–12	19–3	10–12	16–6	14–8	17–5
Cleveland	16–6	12–10	—	15–7	9–13	16–6	15–7	15–7
Detroit	9–13	3–19	7–15	—	7–15	12–10–1	10–12	13–9
New York	13–9	12–10	13–9	15–7	—	19–3	12–10	11–11
Philadelphia	9–13–1	6–16	6–16	10–12–1	3–19	—	8–14	6–16
St. Louis	13–9	8–14	7–15	12–10	10–12	14–8	—	12–9–1
Washington	11–10	5–17	7–15	9–13	11–11	16–6	9–12–1	—

=== Roster ===
1920 Washington Senators
Roster
Pitchers: José Acosta; Harry Biemiller; Gus Bono; Leon Carlson; Jerry Conway; Harry Courtney; Joe Engel; Eric Erickson; Clarence Fisher; Joe Gleason; Walter Johnson; Al Schacht; Jim Shaw; Duke Shirey; Bill Snyder; Tom Zachary	Catchers: Patsy Gharrity; Val Picinich; Infielders: Frank Ellerbe; Bucky Harris; Bill Hollahan; Joe Judge; Bobby LaMotte; George McBride; Jim O'Neill; Frank O'Rourke; Doc Prothro; Howie Shanks; Red Shannon; Fred Thomas; Ricardo Torres; Allie Watt	Outfielders: Frank Brower; Jack Calvo; Ed Johnson; Clyde Milan; Sam Rice; Braggo Roth; Other batters: Elmer Bowman; Joe Leonard	Manager: Clark Griffith

== Player stats ==
=== Batting ===
==== Starters by position ====
Note: Pos = Position; G = Games played; AB = At bats; H = Hits; Avg. = Batting average; HR = Home runs; RBI = Runs batted in

Pos	Player	G	AB	H	Avg.	HR	RBI
C	Patsy Gharrity	131	428	105	.245	3	44
1B	Joe Judge	126	493	164	.333	5	51
2B	Bucky Harris	136	506	152	.300	1	68
SS	Jim O'Neill	86	294	85	.289	1	40
3B	Frank Ellerbe	101	336	98	.292	0	36
OF	Braggo Roth	138	468	136	.291	9	92
OF	Clyde Milan	126	506	163	.322	3	41
OF	Sam Rice	153	624	211	.338	3	80

==== Other batters ====
Note: G = Games played; AB = At bats; H = Hits; Avg. = Batting average; HR = Home runs; RBI = Runs batted in

Player	G	AB	H	Avg.	HR	RBI
Howie Shanks	128	444	119	.268	4	37
Red Shannon	62	222	64	.288	0	30
Val Picinich	48	133	27	.203	3	14
Frank Brower	36	119	37	.311	1	13
Frank O'Rourke	14	54	16	.296	0	5
George McBride	13	41	9	.220	0	3
Ricardo Torres	16	30	10	.333	0	3
Jack Calvo	17	23	1	.043	0	2
Ed Johnson	4	13	3	.231	0	3
Doc Prothro	6	13	5	.385	0	2
Fred Thomas	3	7	1	.143	0	0
Bill Hollahan	3	4	1	.250	0	1
Bobby LaMotte	4	3	0	.000	0	0
Elmer Bowman	2	1	0	.000	0	0
Allie Watt	1	1	1	1.000	0	1
Joe Leonard	1	0	0	----	0	0

=== Pitching ===
==== Starting pitchers ====
Note: G = Games pitched; IP = Innings pitched; W = Wins; L = Losses; ERA = Earned run average; SO = Strikeouts

Player	G	IP	W	L	ERA	SO
Tom Zachary	44	262.2	15	16	3.77	53
Eric Erickson	39	239.1	12	16	3.84	87
Jim Shaw	38	236.1	11	18	4.27	88
Walter Johnson	21	143.2	8	10	3.13	78

==== Other pitchers ====
Note: G = Games pitched; IP = Innings pitched; W = Wins; L = Losses; ERA = Earned run average; SO = Strikeouts

Player	G	IP	W	L	ERA	SO
Harry Courtney	37	188.0	8	11	4.74	48
Al Schacht	22	99.1	6	4	4.44	19
José Acosta	17	82.2	5	4	4.03	9
Bill Snyder	16	54.0	2	1	4.17	17
Harry Biemiller	5	17.0	1	0	4.76	10
Gus Bono	4	12.1	0	2	8.76	4
Duke Shirey	2	4.0	0	1	6.75	0

==== Relief pitchers ====
Note: G = Games pitched; IP = Innings pitched; W = Wins; L = Losses; ERA = Earned run average; SO = Strikeouts

Player	G	W	L	SV	ERA	SO
Leon Carlson	3	0	0	0	3.65	3
Joe Gleason	3	0	0	0	13.50	2
Clarence Fisher	2	0	1	0	9.82	0
Jerry Conway	1	0	0	0	0.00	0
Joe Engel	1	0	0	0	21.60	0
