= Atlantic League (1914) =

Independent professional baseball league in 1914

- Formerly: New York–New Jersey League
- Classification: Class D
- Sport: Baseball
- Founded: March 1914
- Folded: March 1915
- President: Rosslyn M. Cox
- No. of teams: 8
- Country: United States
- Last champion: Poughkeepsie Honey Bugs

The second Atlantic League was a Class D minor league baseball league that operated for one season in 1914. The league had been known as the New York–New Jersey League a season earlier. The league president was Rosslyn M. Cox, who would later serve as the mayor of Middletown, New York.

The Poughkeepsie Honey Bugs finished first in the league standings, with a record of 65–31 (there was no postseason). Internal politics and poor financial agreements hindered the league, which made it to the year's end, but folded before it could play another season. It was unrelated, except for name, to the first league with the name. The name has subsequently been used for a contemporary independent minor league.

== Teams ==
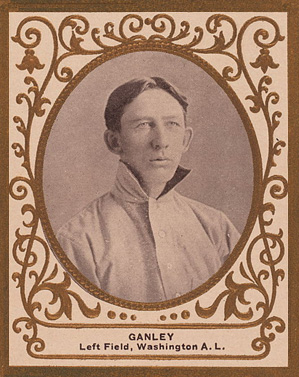
Bob Ganley was one of Perth Amboy's managers.

Team	City	Manager	Notes
Bloomfield–Long Branch Cubans	Bloomfield, New Jersey & Long Branch, New Jersey	Andy Coakley; Samuel Jaeger	team relocated on July 2 to become Asbury Park Sea Urchins
Danbury Hatters	Danbury, Connecticut	Thomas Guiheen	
Middletown Middies	Middletown, New York	Jack Lawlor	
Newark Cubans	Newark, New Jersey	Dick Henriquez	team relocated on July 22
Newburgh Hillclimbers	Newburgh, New York	William Waterman	
Paterson Silk Citys	Paterson, New Jersey	Dick Cogan	
Perth Amboy Pacers	Perth Amboy, New Jersey	Bob Ganley; Hank Ramsey	
Poughkeepsie Honey Bugs	Poughkeepsie, New York	Bill McCabe	

- The Bloomfield–Long Branch Cubans finished the season as the Asbury Park Sea Urchins, located in Asbury Park, New Jersey
- The Newark Cubans finished the season as the Long Branch Cubans, located in Long Branch, New Jersey

=== Final standings ===
Each team was scheduled to play a 100-game season, however all teams played fewer games, due to weather cancellations or the overall condition of the league. The season started on May 20 and ended on September 7.

Team	W	L	Pct.	GB
Poughkeepsie	65	31	.677	—
Newark / Long Branch	59	31	.656	3
Middletown	49	45	.521	15
Danbury	48	47	.505	16½
Perth Amboy	44	49	.473	19½
Newburgh	41	47	.466	20
Paterson	32	54	.372	28
Bloomfield–Long Branch / Asbury Park	30	59	.337	31½

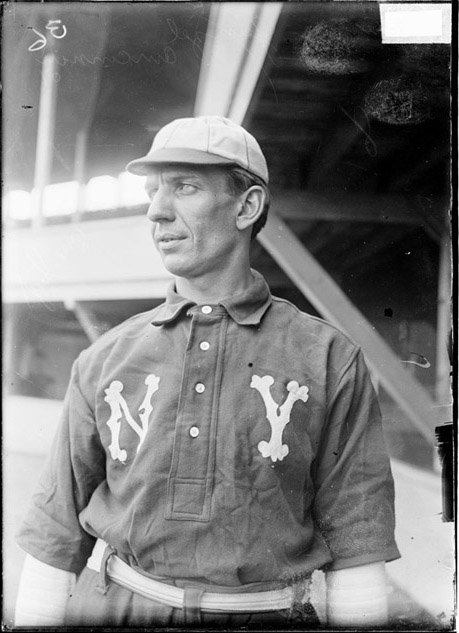
Prior to playing in the Atlantic League, John Ganzel was player-manager of the 1908 Cincinnati Reds.

- Newark was 26–11 when they relocated to Long Branch
- Bloomfield–Long Branch was 15–22 when they relocated to Asbury Park

== Notable players ==
Notable players in the Atlantic League's only season of 1914 include:

- José Acosta
- Ángel Aragón
- Desmond Beatty
- Dennis Berran
- Andy Coakley
- John Ganzel
- Sam Hope
- John Kull
- George Lowe
- Charlie Meara
- Ricardo Torres
