= Perth Amboy Pacers =

- 1914–1916; Perth Amboy, New Jersey

Minor league affiliations
- Class: Class D (1914) Independent (1915-1916)
- League: Atlantic League (1914)

Major league affiliations
- Team: None

Minor league titles
- League titles (0): None

Team data
- Name: Perth Amboy Pacers (1914)
- Ballpark: Amusement Park grounds (1914)

The Perth Amboy Pacers were a minor league baseball team based in Perth Amboy, New Jersey. In 1914, the Pacers played as members of the Class D level Atlantic League, placing fifth in the standings in their only season of play.

In November 1913, the city adopted the slogan 'The Pacemaking City' to compete with other city nicknames in the state, especially Trenton’s 1910 contest-winning slogan “Trenton Makes, the World Takes”. The Pacers nickname was chosen to adhere with the city's forward-thinking slogan of the time.

Perth Amboy hosted minor league home games at the Amusement Park grounds in 1914.

== History ==
Minor league baseball play began in Perth Amboy, New Jersey in 1914 when the Perth Amboy Pacers became members of the newly formed eight–team Class D level Atlantic League. The league had been known as the New York–New Jersey League a season earlier. The Atlantic League president was Rosslyn M. Cox, who would later serve as the mayor of Middletown, New York. The league began play in May 1914, and concluded the season with Perth Amboy as a member on September 7, 1914.

The Bloomfield-Long Branch Cubans, Danbury Hatters, Middletown Middies, Newark Cubans, Newburgh Hillclimbers, Paterson Silk Citys and Poughkeepsie Honey Bugs teams joined Perth Amboy in beginning Atlantic League play on May 20, 1914.

The Perth Amboy Pacers ended the 1914 season in fifth place. The Pacers ended the Atlantic League season with an overall record of 44–49, playing the season under managers Bob Ganley and Henry Ramsey. On August 25, 1914, the local newspaper reported the Pacers were in sixth place with a 34–45 record and had just defeated Middletown on the road 7–2, with an upcoming game at fifth place Newburgh.

The Pacers finished the season 19.0 games behind the first place Poughkeepsie Honey Bugs in the final standings. Poughkeepsie finished in 1st place with a record of 65–31, followed by the Newark Cubans/Long Branch Cubans (59–32), Middletown Middies (47–45), Danbury Hatters (49–48), Perth Amboy Pacers (44–49), Newburgh Hill Climbers (40–48), Paterson Silk Citys (32–54) and Bloomfield-Long Branch Cubans/Asbury Park Sea Urchins (30–59) in the final standings. The league had no playoff system and folded after the 1914 season.

The club returned with an independent schedule with games on Saturday and Sunday that included an impressive list of opponents that included the New York Giants, New York Yankees, and the Negro League Baltimore Giants and Royal Colored Giants. They also welcomed local rivals and the New York Fire Department teams to the amusement park.

Ownership contemplated joining a new league in 1916 but opted out due to the location of many of the cities in Pennsylvania and the doubt that it would be affiliated with organized baseball. They would remain independent playing a schedule against local teams, while still offering minor-league experience at the ballpark.

Ladies were admitted free to home games with a few exceptions to grandstand seating. Boys who wore short trousers were allowed in for 10 cents for home games as well.

That summer saw attendance dip to lows of 200 fans per game (400 fans per game would help him break even). Billy Pfau, who was running the club by himself, envisioned a group of 10-15 area businessmen investing $100 each to share in the cost of operating the team. In total, he lost $2,000 during his three-year venture.

Pfau was set to have a team in Perth Amboy for the 1917 season in the Middlesex County League. His goal was to have 20 home games and sell 1,400 season tickets at 10 cents apiece to revive baseball in the city.

That proved almost impossible when the Amusement Park property was sold and set for redevelopment. With no other ballpark suitable for his club, Pfau folded the club in April and went to his farmland in Somerville.

Perth Amboy, New Jersey has not hosted another minor league team.

== The ballpark ==
The Pacers played at Amusement Park grounds that sat on 21 acres of land. It opened in 1904 and was located 300 feet from city limits in Keasbey in Woodbridge Township. It bordered Smith Street and the Lehigh Valley train track. The Pacers owners Max Gibian and Billy Pfau signed a three-year lease and spent $5,000 refurbishing the fixture to make it one of the best in the league.

The ballpark was located on a hill that gave a bird's eye views of miles of country. The Raritan River was to the south and the city skyline was to the east. It was located 300 feet from the city limits and offered a special trolley service on game days.

The grandstand and field were renovated in time for the arrival of the Pacers. A modern 2,000-capacity grandstand colored in crimson and white with a covered backing was constructed, six high rows of bleacher seating were added down each baseline, and a new entrance was built down the left field line.

Cinder paths were located behind the grandstand and at the back of the third baseline which also included an automobile park outside of the stadium and a refreshment stand near the entrance to the grandstand.

Grading contractors brought out six teams of horses and twenty men and worked ten hours to change the dimensions of the field. The diamond was arranged so that it would lay on a stretch of ground higher than the outfield, which would slope off the same as the outfield at the Polo Grounds.

The Amusement Park also hosted factory, amateur, and high school teams at the stadium. However, within a few years of the improvements on the site, the property was sold in 1917 to a private investor who looked at the redevelopment of the site with housing.

Plans were to remove the grandstand and outfield fence and relocate it to another property in town, most notably Wonderland Park, but it appears that this never happened.

At the time, there was a little sadness about its demise, according to the Perth Amboy Evening News:

“The passing of Amusement Park marks the disappearance of a fixture in Perth Amboy sport. For years and years, a ball field of one description or another has stood on the hilltop, the first stands and fences having been gradually dismantled by firewood seekers and the latter standing in good condition, but useless.”

[13]

== Year–by–year record ==
Year	Record	Finish	Manager	Playoffs/Notes
1914	44–49	5th	Bob Ganley / Henry Ramsey	No playoffs held

== Notable alumni ==
- Bob Ganley (1914, MGR)
- Charlie Meara (1914)
- Perth Amboy Pacers players
