= Newburgh Taylor-mades =

Newburgh Taylor–mades
- 1886–1914; (1886, 1888, 1903–1907, 1913–1914); Newburgh, New York

Minor league affiliations
- Class: Independent (1886, 1888); Class D (1903); Class C (1904–1907); Class D (1913–1914)
- League: Hudson River League (1886, 1888, 1903–1907); New York-New Jersey League (1913); Atlantic League (1914)

Major league affiliations
- Team: None

Minor league titles
- League titles (0): None

Team data
- Name: Newburgh (1886, 1888); Newburgh Taylor-mades (1903–1905); Newburgh Hill Climbers (1906); Newburgh Hillies (1907); Newburgh Dutchmen (1913); Newburgh Hillclimbers (1914)
- Ballpark: West End Park (1903–1913); Driving Park (1914)

The Newburgh Taylor–mades was a primary name of the minor league baseball teams based in Newburgh, New York. Between 1886 and 1914, Newburgh teams played under numerous nicknames as members of the Hudson River League (1886, 1888, 1903–1907), the 1913 New York-New Jersey League and 1914 Atlantic League.

Newburgh hosted minor league home games at the West End Park and Driving Park.

Baseball Hall of Fame member Dan Brouthers managed the 1906 Newburgh Hill Climbers.

== History ==
=== Hudson River League 1886, 1888, 1903–1907 ===
Newburgh began minor league play in 1886. Newburgh fielded a team in the 1886 Hudson River League, playing under Manager Sandy McDermott. Newburgh finished with a record of 37–22, playing under manager Henry Lawson. Newburg placed second in the Hudson River League standings, finishing 7.0 games behind the first place Poughkeepsie team. The Hudson River League had no 1886 playoffs.

Newburgh played again in the 1888 Hudson River League. The Hudson River League stopped play on June 6, 1888, with rosters and standings unknown.

In 1903, the Newburgh "Taylor-mades" became members of the Class C level Hudson River League, which reformed after a fifteen–year absence. On March 25, 1903, and on April 1, 1903, meetings were held which resulted in forming the six–team Hudson River League for the 1903 season. The Peekskill Highlanders joined the league as a seventh team during the season. The Taylor–mades ended the 1903 season with a record of 37–54, placing sixth in the overall standings. Charles Fisher served as manager, as Newburg finished 25.0 games behind the first place Kingston Colonials.

The 1904 Newburgh Taylor-mades placed last in Class C level Hudson River League. On September 4, 1904, Poughkeepsie Colts pitcher Jimmy Dygert threw a no–hitter against the Newburgh Taylor–mades, winning 2–0. Newburgh finished with a 39–81 record under managers Charles Fisher, John Green and Fred Taylor. The Taylor-mades placed sixth and finished 35.5 games behind the first place Poughkeepsie Colts in the final league standings. There were no 1904 playoffs.

In 1905, the Newburgh Taylor-mades placed fourth in the eight–team Hudson River League. Newburgh ended the 1905 regular season with a record of 60–54, playing under returning manager Fred Taylor and Henry Ramsey. The Taylor-mades finished 6.0 games behind the champion Hudson Mariners in the final standings.

The Newburgh Hill Climbers continued play in the 1906 Hudson River League. Newburgh ended the season in fifth place with a 43–45 record, led by managers Dan Brouthers, Fred Ochs, Billy Taylor and Fred McGratty. On September 9, 1906, Newburgh was 16.0 games behind the first place Paterson Invaders when the Hudson River League ceased play for the season. Brouthers was elected to the Baseball Hall of Fame.

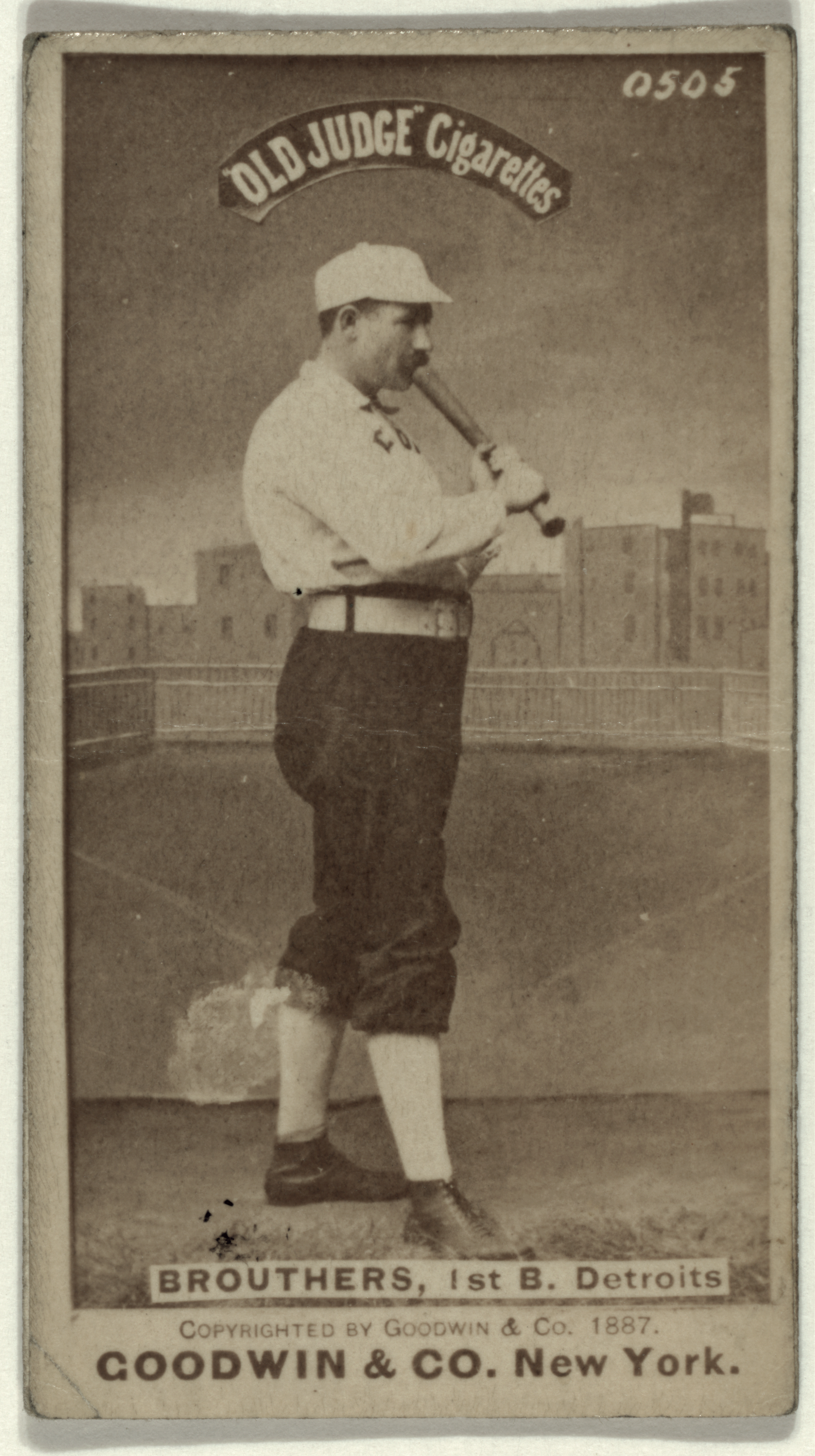
Dan Brouthers, Detroit Wolverines baseball card

The six–team Class C level Hudson River League resumed play to begin the 1907 season. The Newburgh Hillies were in second place on June 18, 1907, when the Hudson River League permanently folded. The Hudson River league was down to four remaining teams, after having the Kingston and Paterson franchises fold in early June. The Newburg Hillies were managed by Jim Connor and had a 15–11 record, and stood 1.5 games behind the first place Poughkeepsie Colts when the league folded.

=== 1913 New York-New Jersey League / 1914 Atlantic League ===
Newburgh returned to play in 1913 and finished last in the league standings. The Newburgh Dutchmen became members of the six–team Class D level New York-New Jersey League, placing sixth in the 1913 standings. The Dutchmen finished with a record of 41–54, playing under manager Archie Marshall, finishing 24.5 games behind the first place Long Branch Cubans. Long Branch (65–29) was followed by the Poughkeepsie Honey Bugs (48–49), Kingston Colonials (45–46), Middletown Middies (42–51), Danbury Hatters (43–55) and Newburgh Dutchmen (41–54) in the final league standings.

The 1914 Newburgh Hillclimbers continued league play in the renamed eight–team Class D level Atlantic League, which had been called the New York–New Jersey League a year earlier. Playing under managers Andrew Marshall and Todd Waterman, Newburgh finished with a 40–48 record, to place sixth in the Class D level Atlantic League final standings, finishing 21.0 games behind the first place Poughkeepsie Honey Bugs. Poughkeepsie finished with a record of 65–31, followed by the Newark Cubans/Long Branch Cubans (59–32), Middletown Middies (47–45), Danbury Hatters (49–48), Perth Amboy Pacers (44–49), Newburgh Hill Climbers (40–48), Paterson Silk Citys (32–54) and Bloomfield-Long Branch Cubans/Asbury Park Sea Urchins (30–59) in the final standings. The league had no playoff system and folded after the 1914 season.

Newburgh was without a minor league team until the 1946 Newburgh Hummingbirds played a partial season as members of the Class D level North Atlantic League.

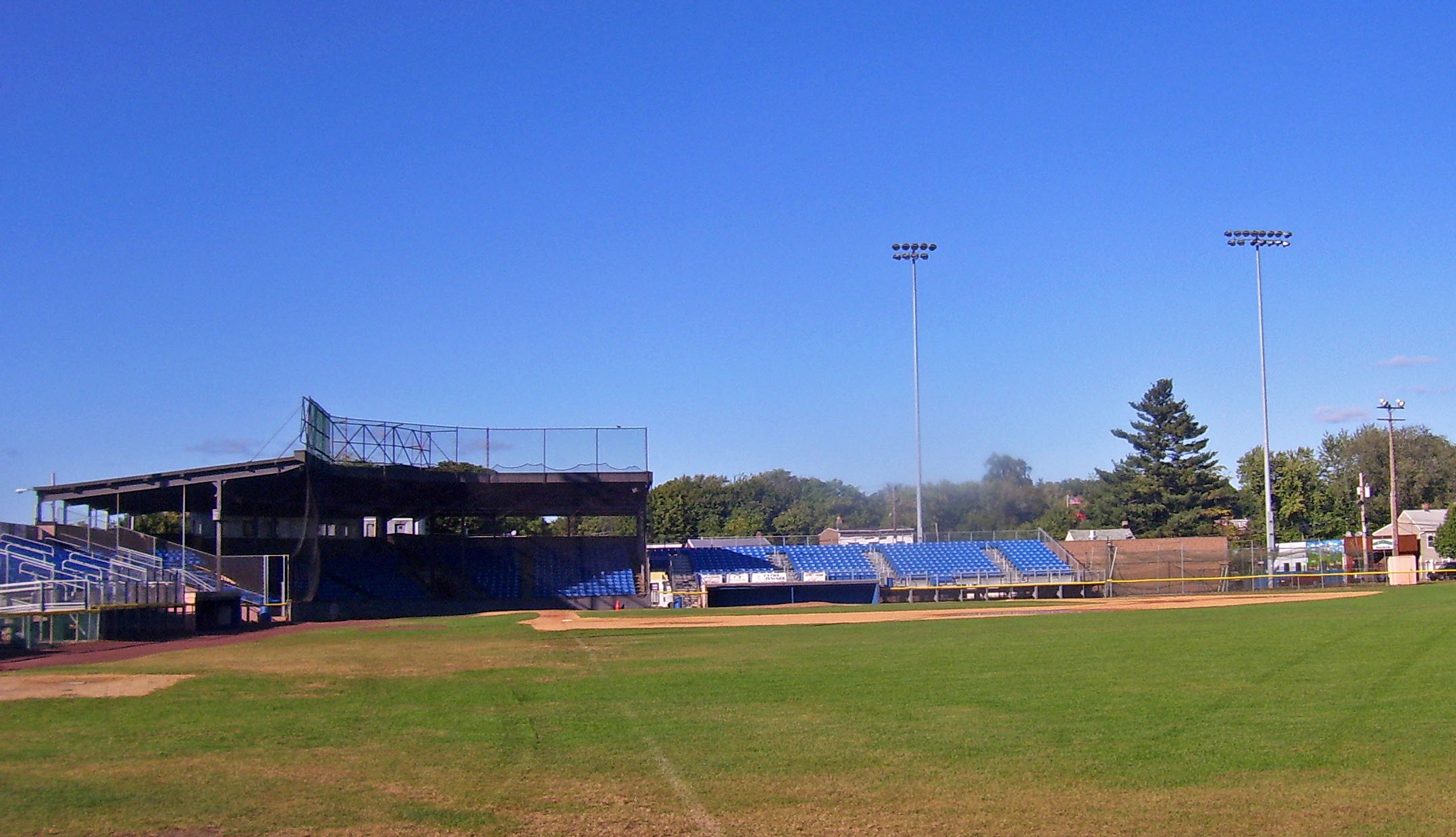
(2007) Delano-Hitch Stadium

== The ballparks ==
In the seasons between 1903 and 1913, Newburgh minor league teams hosted minor league home games at West End Park.

In 1914, the Newburgh Hillclimbers reportedly played home games at Driving Park. Today, the site is still hosts baseball, with the ballpark known as Delano-Hitch Stadium. The ballpark is located at 401 Washington Street in Newburgh, New York.

== Timeline ==
Year(s)	# Yrs.	Team	Level	League	Ballpark
1886	1	Newburgh	Independent	Hudson River League	West End Park
1988	1	Newburgh	Independent	Hudson River League	West End Park
1903	1	Newburgh Taylor-mades	Class D	Hudson River League	West End Park
1904-1905	2	Newburgh Taylor-mades	Class C	Hudson River League	West End Park
1906	1	Newburgh Hill Climbers	Class C	Hudson River League	West End Park
1907	1	Newburgh Hillies	Class C	Hudson River League	West End Park
1913	1	Newburgh Dutchmen	Class D	New York-New Jersey League	West End Park
1914	1	Newburgh Hillclimbers	Class D	Atlantic League	Driving Park

== Year–by–year records ==
Year	Record	Finish	Manager	Playoffs/Notes
1886	37–22	2nd	Harry Lawson	No playoffs held
1888	0–0	NA	Unknown	League folded June 6, 1888
1903	37–54	6th	Charles Fisher	No playoffs held
1904	39–81	6th	Charles Fisher / John Green; Fred Taylor	No playoffs held
1905	60–54	4th	Fred Taylor / Henry Ramsey	No playoffs held
1906	43–45	5th	Dan Brouthers / Fred Ochs; Billy Taylor / Fred McGratty	No playoffs held
1907	15–11	2nd	Jim Connor	League folded June 18
1913	41–54	6th	Archie Marshall	No playoffs held
1914	40–48	6th	Andrew Marshall / Todd Waterman	No playoffs held

== Notable alumni ==
- Dan Brouthers (1906, MGR) Inducted Baseball Hall of Fame, 1945
- Harry Betts (1904)
- John Ganzel (1914)
- Sam Hope (1913–1914)
- Mike Jacobs (1906)
- Joe Lake (1905–1906)
- George Lowe (1914)
- Jim Riley (1906)

== See also ==
- Newburgh Dutchmen players
- Newburgh Hill Climbers players
- Newburgh Hillclimbers players
- Newburgh Taylor-mades players
