= Middletown Middies =

- 1913–1914; Middletown, New York

Minor league affiliations
- Class: Class D (1913–1914)
- League: New York–New Jersey League (1913); Atlantic League (1914)

Major league affiliations
- Team: None

Minor league titles
- League titles (0): None

Team data
- Name: Middletown Middies (1913–1914)
- Ballpark: Watts Field (1913–1914)

The Middletown Middies were a minor league baseball team based in Middletown, New York. In 1913 and 1914, the Middies played as members of the New York–New Jersey League in 1913 and Atlantic League in 1914.

Middletown hosted home minor league games at Watts Field.

== History ==
Minor league baseball play began in Middletown, New York in 1913, when the Middletown "Middies" became members of the six–team Class D level New York–New Jersey League. The Danbury Hatters, Kingston Colonials, Long Branch Cubans, Newburgh Hillclimbers and Poughkeepsie Honey Bugs teams joined Middletown in league play.

Middletown ended the 1913 season with a record of 42–51, placing fourth in the New York–New Jersey League as Jack Lawlor served as manager. Middletown finished 22.5 games behind the first place Long Branch Cubans. Long Branch (65–29) was followed by the Poughkeepsie Honey Bugs (48–49), Kingston Colonials (45–46), Middletown Middies (42–51), Danbury Hatters (43–55) and Newburgh Hilltoppers (41–54) in the final league standings.

The 1914 Middletown Middies continued play in a new league. Middleton joined the eight–team Class D level Atlantic League. The league had been known as the New York–New Jersey League a season earlier. The Atlantic League president was Rosslyn M. Cox, who had also presided over the New York–New Jersey League. Cox would later serve as the mayor of Middletown, New York. The league began play on May 20, 1914, and concluded the season with Middletown as a member on September 7, 1914.

The Middletown Middies ended the 1914 season in third place in the Atlantic League standings. The Middies ended the season with an overall record of 44–49, playing under returning manager Jack Lawlor. Middleton finished the season 16.0 games behind the first place Poughkeepsie Honey Bugs in the final standings. Poughkeepsie finished in 1st place with a record of 65–31, followed by the Newark Cubans/Long Branch Cubans (59–32), Middletown Middies (47–45), Danbury Hatters (49–48), Perth Amboy Pacers (44–49), Newburgh Hill Climbers (40–48), Paterson Silk Citys (32–54) and Bloomfield-Long Branch Cubans/Asbury Park Sea Urchins (30–59) in the final standings. The league had no playoff system and folded after the 1914 season.

Middletown, New York has not hosted another minor league team.

== The ballpark ==
The Middletown Middies teams hosted their minor league home games at Watts Field. Today, the site is known as "Watts Memorial Park" and is still in use as a public park with ballfields.

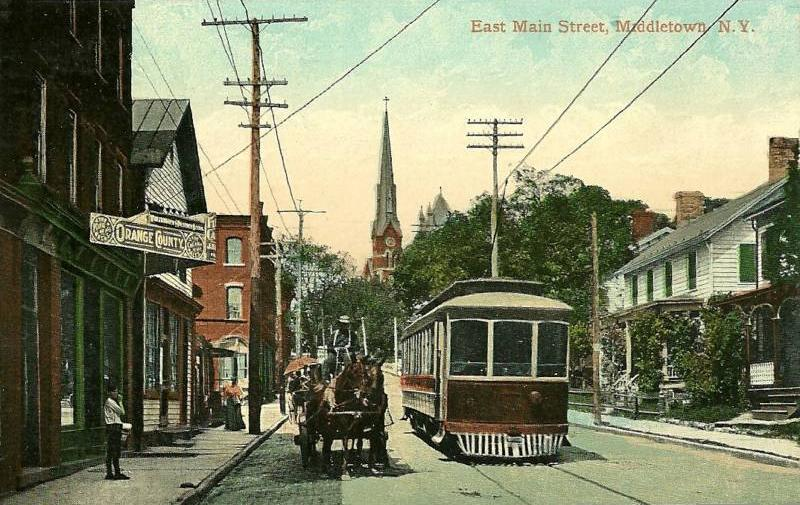
(1909) East Main Street, Middletown, New York

The park is located at 120 Watkins Avenue in Middletown, New York.

== Timeline ==
Year(s)	# Yrs.	Team	Level	League	Ballpark
1913	1	Middletown Middies	Class D	New York–New Jersey League	Watts Field
1914	1	Middletown Middies	Class D	Atlantic League	Watts Field

== Year–by–year records ==
Year	Record	Finish	Manager	Playoffs/Notes
1914	42–51	4th	Jack Lawlor	No playoffs held
1914	47–45	3rd	Jack Lawlor	No playoffs held

== Notable alumni ==
No alumni of the Middletown Middies reached the major leagues.

1913 Middleton player James O'Rourke went on to play with the 1914 Newark Indians of the International League, batting .321. O'Rourke was killed fighting in France in World War I in 1918.
