= Saugerties (baseball) =

- 1903–1905; Saugerties, New York

Minor league affiliations
- Class: Class D (1903); Class C (1904–1905)
- League: Hudson River League (1903–1905)

Major league affiliations
- Team: None

Minor league titles
- League titles (0): None

Team data
- Name: Saugerties (1903–1905)
- Ballpark: Cantine Field* (1903–1905)

The Saugerties team was a minor league baseball team based in Saugerties, New York. From 1903 to 1905, Saugerties played as members of the Hudson River League. The team relocated to become the Pittsfield Hillies during the 1905 season.

== History ==
In 1903, Saugerties became members of the Class D level Hudson River League. The league was reformed after a fifteen–year absence. On March 25, 1903, and on April 1, 1903, meetings were held which resulted in forming the six–team Hudson River League for the 1903 season. The Hudson Marines, Kingston Colonials, Newburgh Taylor-mades, Ossining and Poughkeepsie Colts teams joined Saugerties in beginning league play on May 21, 1903, The Peekskill Highlanders joined the league as a seventh team on August 10, 1903, and were given a 21–24 record in beginning league play.

In their first season of minor league play, Saugerties ended the 1903 season in fourth place. With a record of 48–47, playing the season under manager Charles Brady, Saugerties Newburg finished 16.0 games behind the first place Kingston Colonials in the final standings, as the league held no playoffs.

During the 1903 season, the Hudson River League held the first mid-season all-star game in baseball history. Rube DeGroff of Saugerties was chosen to play in the contest and delivered two hits in the game, which was held On August 17, 1903. DeGroff was traded to the Kingston Colonials in September 1903.

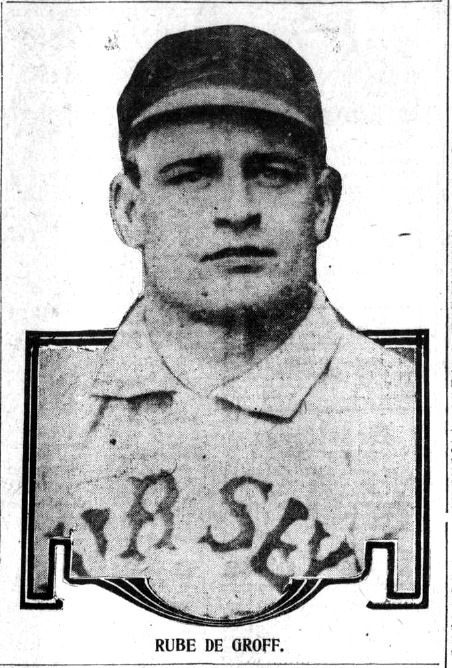
(1908) Rube DeGroff. Newspaper Photo.

The 1904 Saugerties team placed fifth in the six-team in Class C level Hudson River League, as the league was upgraded from Class D. Saugerties ended the season with a 50–68 record under manager John O'Halloran and finished 20.5 games behind the first place Poughkeepsie Colts in the final league standings. There were no 1904 playoffs.

In 1905, the Saugerties team relocated during the Hudson River League season. On July 1, 1905, Saugerties had a record of 8–34, playing under managers D. J. Schulman /and Daniel Cassiday, when the franchise relocated to Pittsfield, Massachusetts to become the Pittsfield Hillies. The Hillies then folded on July 25, 1905. After compiling a record of 5–15 record based in Pittsfield, the team finished with an overall record of 13–49.

Saugerties, New York has not hosted another minor league team in 2015, the amateur Saugerties Stallions began play as members of the Perfect Game Collegiate Baseball League.

== The ballparks ==
The name of the Saugerties' home minor league ballpark is not directly referenced. The site of today's Cantine Field was in use in the era as a privately owned public use park known as the Driving Park. The 127-acre park was founded in the late 1800s. Containing 11 baseball fields, the Cantine Memorial Complex is located on the Washington Avenue extension in Saugerties.

== Timeline ==
Year(s)	# Yrs.	Team	Level	League
1903	1	Saugerties	Class D	Hudson River League
1904-1905	2	Saugerties	Class C	Hudson River League

== Year–by–year records ==
Year	Record	Finish	Manager	Playoffs/Notes
1903	48–47	4th	Charles Brady	No playoffs held
1904	50–68	5th	John O'Halloran	No playoffs held
1905	13–45	NA	D. J. Schulman / Daniel F. Cassiday	Team (8–34) moved Pittsfield to July 1 Team folded July 25

== Notable alumni ==
- Rube DeGroff (1903)
