= Paterson Invaders =

- 1904–1907; Paterson, New Jersey

Minor league affiliations
- Class: Class C (1904–1907)
- League: Hudson River League (1904–1907)

Major league affiliations
- Team: None

Minor league titles
- League titles (1): 1906

Team data
- Name: Paterson Intruders (1904); Paterson Invaders (1905–1906); Paterson Intruders (1907)
- Ballpark: East Side Park*

The Paterson Invaders were a minor league baseball team based in Paterson, New Jersey. From 1904 to 1907, Paterson teams played as members of the Class C level Hudson River League, winning the 1906 league championship. The team played as the "Intruders" in the 1904 and 1907 seasons, before the franchise folded during the 1907 season, leading to the demise of the league.

== History ==
The Paterson Intruders were preceded in minor league play by the 1899 Paterson Giants who played the last of Paterson's four seasons as members of the Class A level Atlantic League, the highest level of minor leagues at the time.

In 1904, the Paterson "Intruders" became members of the Class C level Hudson River League. The Hudson River League had reformed in 1903 after a fifteen–year absence. On March 25, 1903, and on April 1, 1903, meetings were held which resulted in forming the six–team Hudson River League for the 1903 season. The Peekskill Highlanders joined the league as a seventh–team during the season, eventually being partially replaced the next season by Paterson.

In 1904, Paterson joined the six-team Class C level Hudson River League. The Hudson Marines, Kingston Colonials, Newburgh Taylor-mades, Poughkeepsie Colts and Saugerties teams joined Paterson in beginning league play on May 13, 1904. The Peekskill and Catskill teams did not return to play in the 1904 and Paterson was added.

In their first season of play, the 1904 Paterson Intruders placed second in Class C level Hudson River League final standings, as the league held no playoffs. Paterson ended the season with 70–49 record, playing the season under manager Dick Cogan, who would manage the team in each of its four seasons. The Intruders finished just 1.0 game behind the first place Poughkeepsie Colts (70-47) in the final league standings.

In 1905, Paterson continued play, becoming known as the "Invaders", a synonym of "Intruders." Patterson again placed second, as the Hudson River League expanded to an eight–team league. The Invaders ended the 1905 regular season with a record of 62–51, playing under returning manager Dick Cogan. Paterson finished just 1.0 game behind the champion Hudson Mariners in the final standings.

The 1906 Paterson Invaders won the Hudson River League championship in a shortened season. Paterson ended the season in first place with a 64–47 record, led by manager Dick Cogan. On September 9, 1906, the Invaders were 1.0 game ahead of the second place Poughkeepsie Colts when the Hudson River League ceased play for the season.

The six–team Class C level Hudson River League folded during the 1907 season after the Paterson "Intruders" had already folded. On June 2, 1907, Paterson folded with a record of 4-9, with Dick Cogan remaining as manager. On June 18, 1907, the Hudson River League permanently folded. The Hudson River league was down to four remaining teams, after the Kingston Colonial Colts had joined Paterson by folding in early June.

After the Paterson Invaders folded, the city was without a minor league team until the 1914 "Paterson Silk Citys" played the season as members of the Atlantic League.

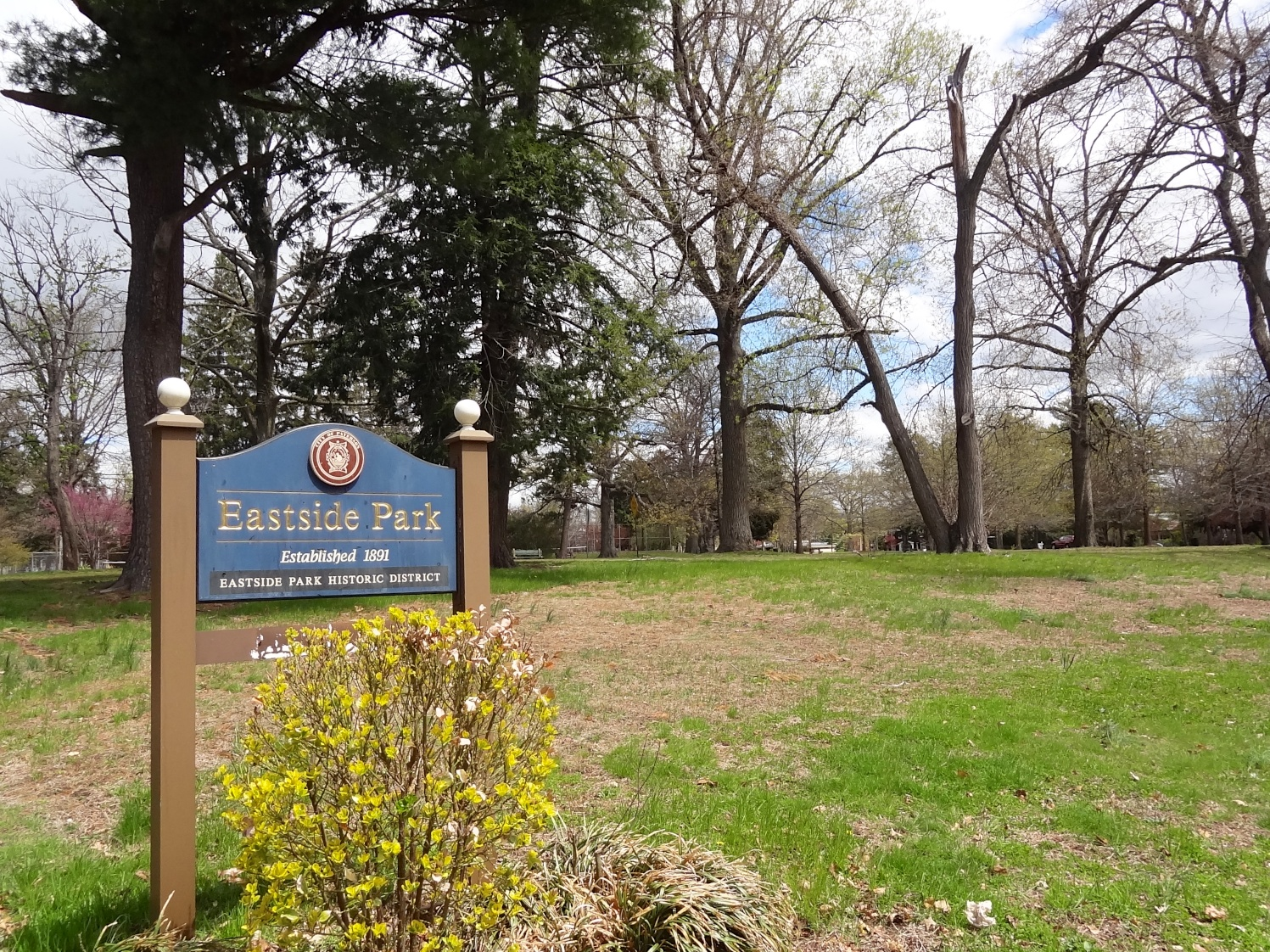
(2014) Eastside Park Entrance sign, Paterson, NJ

== The ballparks ==
The name of the Paterson home ballpark in Hudson River League play is not directly referenced. East Side Park was in use in the era, hosting baseball, after first becoming a public park in the 1880s. East Side Park is still in use today as a public park, hosting baseball at Larry Doby Field, which lies within the park. East Side Park is located on Martin Luther King, Jr. Way (Broadway) to the north, McLean Boulevard (State Route 20) to the east, Park Avenue to the south, and Derrom Avenue to the west.

In 1904, Paterson hosted some home games at an unknown ballpark in neighboring Clifton, New Jersey.

== Timeline ==
Year(s)	# Yrs.	Team	Level	League
1904	1	Paterson Intruders	Class C	Hudson River League
1905–1906	2	Paterson Invaders	Class C	Hudson River League
1907	1	Paterson Intruders	Class C	Hudson River League

== Year-by–year records ==
Year	Record	Finish	Manager	Playoffs/Notes
1904	70–49	2nd	Dick Cogan	No playoffs held
1905	62–51	2nd	Dick Cogan	No playoffs held
1906	64–47	1st	Dick Cogan	League champions League folded September 9
1907	4-9	NA	Dick Cogan	Team folded June 2 League folded June 18

== Notable alumni ==
- Dick Cogan (1904-1907, MGR)
- Phil Cooney (1904-1906)
- Leo Harrison (1905-1906)
- Sam Hope (1905-1906)
- George McQuillan (1904)
- Jack Schulte (1905)

== See also ==
- Paterson Intruders players
