= Luis Padrón =

Cuban baseball player (born 1878)

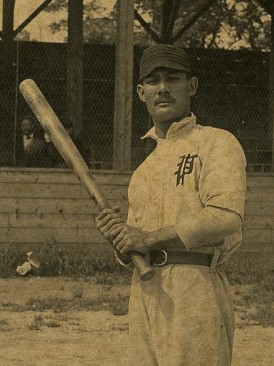
- Corner outfielder / Pitcher / Third baseman
- Born: 1878; Matanzas, Cuba
- Died: 1939; Cuba
- Batted: Right Threw: Right

Cuban League debut
- 1902, for the Habana

Last appearance
- 1916, for the Jersey City/Poughkeepsie Cubans
- Stats at Baseball Reference

Member of the Cuban

Baseball Hall of Fame
- Induction: 1943

Luis "El Mulo" Padrón Otorena (ca. 1878 – 1939) was a Cuban professional baseball corner outfielder, pitcher and third baseman in the Negro leagues and Cuban League.

Padron played from 1902 to 1917 with several Cuban ballclubs, including Habana, San Francisco, Club Fé, San Francisco Park, and Almendares. He played in the Negro leagues in 1909 and 1911 for the Cuban Stars (West), and in 1915 and 1916 for the Long Branch/Jersey City/Poughkeepsie Cubans.

Padron also played in the Minor leagues, playing in the South Atlantic League, Connecticut State League, Illinois–Indiana–Iowa League, Ohio–Pennsylvania League, New York–New Jersey League, and the Atlantic League.

He was elected to the Cuban Baseball Hall of Fame in 1943.
