= Orientals (baseball) =

Cuban baseball team

Information
- League: Cuban League
- Location: Havana, Cuba
- Established: 1916
- Disbanded: 1917

The Orientals were a Cuban baseball team in the Cuban League based in Havana. They played during the winter of 1916-1917 and Armando Marsans served as manager.

After Cuban League players had refused to participate in the established league due to a revolt over a percentage of gate receipts, the 1917 season saw the formation of a hastily organized league and shortened schedule, taking place between January 29 and February 26. Almendares, Habana and San Francisco Park took the names of Orientals, Red Sox, and White Sox, respectively.

The three teams played their games at the Oriental Park Racetrack, which was altered to host baseball for the season. However, the position of the stands far from the field, and the scheduling of morning games due to afternoon horse races, prevented large crowds.

The Orientals won the league with an 8–6 record, edging out the Red Sox and White Sox by 1.5 games.

== Notable players ==
- José Acosta
- Jack Calvo
- Earl Hamilton
- Dolf Luque
- Armando Marsans
- José Rodríguez
- Tomás Romañach
- Ricardo Torres
