= Romañach =

Romañach is a surname. Notable people with the surname include:

- Leopoldo Romañach (1862–1951), Cuban painter and educator
- Mario Romañach (1917–1984), Cuban architect and professor
- Tomás Romañach (1890–?), Cuban baseball player
