= Poughkeepsie Colts =

- 1886–1950; (1886, 1888, 1894, 1903–1907, 1909, 1913–1914, 1947–1950); Poughkeepsie, New York

Minor league affiliations
- Class: Class B (1947–1950); Class C (1904–1907); Class D (1903); Independent (1886, 1888, 1909)
- League: Hudson River League (1886, 1888); New York State League (1894); Hudson River League (1903–1907); Eastern Association (1909); New York-New Jersey League (1913); Atlantic League (1914); Colonial League (1947–1950)

Major league affiliations
- Team: None

Minor league titles
- League titles (5): 1886; 1904; 1907; 1914; 1950

Team data
- Name: Poughkeepsie (1886, 1888); Poughkeepsie Bridge Citys (1894); Poughkeepsie Colts (1903–1907); Poughkeepsie Students (1909); Poughkeepsie Honey Bugs (1913–1914); Poughkeepsie Giants (1947); Poughkeepsie Chiefs (1948–1950)
- Ballpark: Riverview Field (1903–1907, 1909, 1913–1914, 1947–1950)

The Poughkeepsie Colts was a primary name of the minor league baseball teams based in Poughkeepsie, New York. Between 1886 and 1950, Poughkeepsie teams played as members of the Hudson River League (1886, 1888), New York State League (1894), Hudson River League (1903–1907), Eastern Association (1909), New York-New Jersey League (1913), Atlantic League (1914) and Colonial League (1948–1950). Poughkeepsie teams won five league championships.

Baseball Hall of Fame member Dan Brouthers played for the Poughkeepsie Colts in from 1903 to 1905.

== History ==
=== Hudson River League 1886, 1888/New York State League 1894 ===
Poughkeepsie won a championship in their first season of minor league play. Poughkeepsie fielded a team in the 1886 Hudson River League, playing under Manager Sandy McDermott. Poughkeepsie finished with a record of 47–18, 1st place in the Hudson River League standings, 7.0 games ahead of second place Newburgh. The Hudson River League had no 1886 playoffs.

Poughkeepsie played again in the 1888 Hudson River League. Poughkeepsie was Managed by Joe Farrell. The Hudson River League stopped play on June 6, 1888.

The Poughkeepsie Bridge Citys became members the Independent 1894 New York State League. The Bridge Citys finished in second place in the New York League standings, ending the 1894 season with a record of 25–21 under Manager John Darrow. The Poughkeepsie River Citys finished 2.0 games behind the champion Amsterdam Carpet Tacks. The Hudson River League did not return to play in 1895.

=== Hudson River League 1903–1907 ===
In 1903, Poughkeepsie Colts became members of the reformed Class D level Hudson River League. The Colts began play at the new Riverview Field. The Colts ended the 1903 season with a record of 39–51, placing fifth in the standings. Bill McCabe served as manager, beginning a lengthy tenure as the manager of Poughkeepsie teams. At age 45, Baseball Hall of Fame inductee Dan Brouthers began a three-year tenure with the Colts, hitting .286 in 16 games.

The 1904 Poughkeepsie Colts won the championship of the Class C level Hudson River League. Poughkeepsie finished with a 70–47 record under Manager Bill McCabe. The Colts were 1.0 games ahead of the second place Paterson Intruders in the final league standings. There were no 1904 playoffs. At age 46, Baseball Hall of Famer Dan Brouthers played his second season with the Colts, hitting .373 with 11 home runs in 117 games.

On September 3, 1904, Colts pitcher Jimmy Dygert threw a no–hitter against the Newburgh Taylor-mades, winning 2–0.

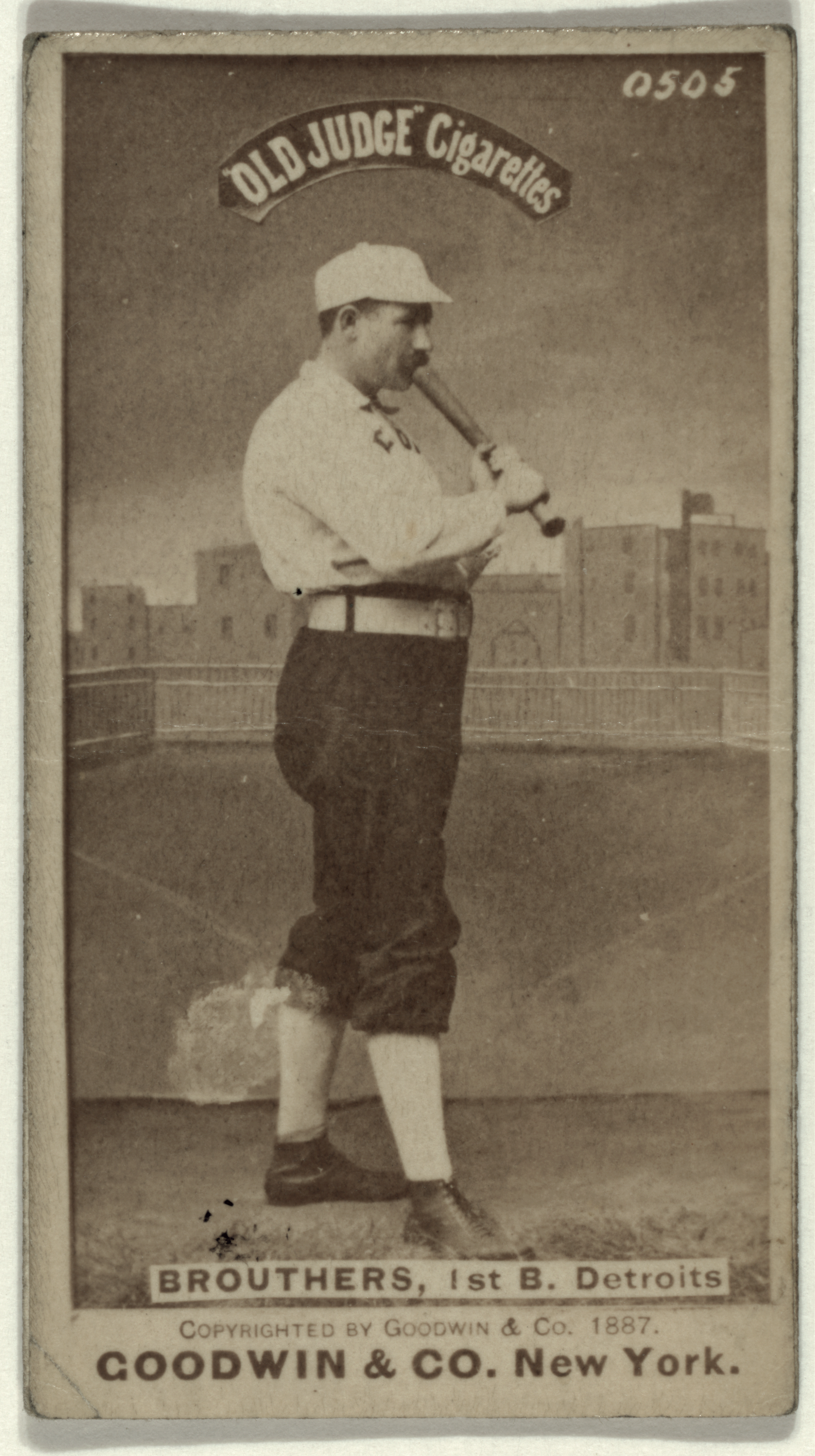
Dan Brouthers, Detroit Wolverines, baseball card portrait

In 1905, the Poughkeepsie Colts placed third in the Hudson River League. The Colts ended the 1905 regular season with a record of 59–52 under Bill McCabe. Poughkeepsie was 5.5 games behind the champion Hudson Marines. Baseball Hall of Famer Dan Brouthers hit .295 with 6 home runs in 81 games for the Colts at age 47.

The Poughkeepsie Colts continued play in the 1906 Hudson River League. Poughkeepsie finished in second place with a 60–45 record, led again by Manager Bill McCabe. On September 9, 1906, Poughkeepsie was 1.0 games behind the first place Paterson Invaders when the Hudson River League ceased play for the season.

The Class C Hudson River League resumed play to begin the 1907 season. Poughkeepsie was in first place on June 18, 1907, when the six–team Hudson River League permanently folded. The Hudson River league was down to four remaining teams, after having the Kingston and Paterson franchises fold in early June. The Poughkeepsie Colts were again Managed by Bill McCabe and had a 17–10 record, 1.5 games ahead of the second place Newburgh Hillies when the league folded.

=== Eastern Association 1909/New York-New Jersey League 1913/Atlantic League 1914 ===
Poughkeepsie returned to minor league play in 1909. The Poughkeepsie Students played in the Independent Eastern Association. The team was short lived as the Eastern Association folded on June 6, 1909. Fred Page was the 1909 Poughkeepsie manager.

Poughkeepsie returned to minor league play in 1913 under former manager Bill McCabe, when the Poughkeepsie Honey Bugs became members of the Class D New York-New Jersey League, finishing second in the 1913 standings. The Poughkeepsie Honey Bugs finished 48–49, 18.5 games behind the first place Long Branch Cubans.

The 1914 Poughkeepsie Honey Bugs won a championship as they resumed league play in the renamed Atlantic League. Playing under Manager Bill McCabe, Poughkeepsie finished 65–31, placing first in the Class D Atlantic League final standings, 3.5 games ahead of the second place Long Branch Cubans. Poughkeepsie was unable to defend their title as the Atlantic League folded after the 1914 season.

=== Colonial League 1948–1950 ===
Thirty-three years after the Atlantic League folded, the 1947 Poughkeepsie Giants became members of the Class B Colonial League. The Poughkeepsie Giants finished second in the six–team Colonial League regular season with a record of 66–50 under manager Eric McNair. In the Colonial League Playoffs, the New London Raiders defeated the Poughkeepsie Giants 4 games to 3. The Giants returned to play at Riverview Field, with 1947 season home attendance of 43,403, an average of 748 per game.

The Poughkeepsie Chiefs advanced to the 1948 Colonial League Finals. Managed by Steve Mizerak, the Chiefs had a 76–61 regular season record, finishing in second place, 9.0 games behind the first place Port Chester Clippers. In the 1948 Playoffs, Poughkeepsie defeated the New Brunswick/Kingston Hubs 4 games to 1. In the Colonial League Finals, the Port Chester Clippers defeated the Poughkeepsie Chiefs 4 games to 1. Poughkeepsie had season home attendance of 38,573 at Riverview Field.

The 1949 Poughkeepsie Chiefs finished fifth in the Colonial League standings and missed the playoffs. The Chiefs finished with a 45–78 record under managers Woody Williams, Elmer Weingartner and Gabe Mauro. Riverview Field home season attendance was 25,123, an average of 409 per game.

In their final season of minor league play, Poughkeepsie won an abbreviated championship. The 1950 Poughkeepsie Chiefs were in first place in the league standings when the Colonial League folded on July 16, 1950. The Poughkeepsie Chiefs had a record of 43–26 losses, 3.0 games ahead of the second place Kingston Colonials. Robert Doyle was the 1950 manager.

After Colonial League folded on July 16, 1950, minor league baseball has not returned to Poughkeepsie.

== The ballpark ==
From 1903 to 1950, Poughkeepsie minor league teams hosted minor league home games at Riverview Field. Opened in 1903, the ballpark had a capacity of 4,500 (1949) and 5,500 (1950). Riverview Field was located at 4 Lincoln Ave in Poughkeepsie, New York. Today, the location is still in use as a baseball field, known as Stitzel Field.

== Notable alumni ==
- Dan Brouthers (1903–1905) Inducted Baseball Hall of Fame, 1945
- Desmond Beatty (1914)
- Joe Berry (1894)
- Al Burch (1904–1905)
- Bill Daley (1894)
- Jimmy Dygert (1903–1904)
- Jack Fox (1906)
- John Ganzel (1914)
- Ed Irwin (1905)
- Jim McCormick (1905)
- Eric McNair (1947, MGR)
- Sandy McDermott (1886, MGR)
- Jay Kirke (1907)
- Elmer Steele (1906)
- Pete Taylor (1947)
- Elmer Weingartner (1949, MGR)

== See also ==
- Poughkeepsie Bridge Citys players
- Poughkeepsie Honey Bugs players
- Poughkeepsie Giants players
- Poughkeepsie Colts players
