= Tomás Calvo =

Cuban baseball player

- Outfielder
- Born: 1890; Cuba
- Died: Unknown
- Batted: Right Threw: Right

Negro league baseball debut
- 1915, for the Long Branch Cubans

Last appearance
- 1916, for the Long Branch Cubans

Teams
- Long Branch Cubans (1915–1916)

Tomás Calvo (1890 – death unknown) was a Cuban outfielder in the Negro leagues and the Cuban League in the 1910s and 1920s.

A native of Cuba, Calvo was the brother of major leaguer Jack Calvo. Older brother Tomás made his Negro leagues debut in 1915 with the Long Branch Cubans, and played with the club again in 1916. Between 1912 and 1923, he also played several seasons in the Cuban League with the Almendares and Habana clubs.
