= Gerry Conway (disambiguation) =

Gerry Conway may refer to:

- Gerry Conway (1952–2026), American writer and editor
- Gerry Conway (musician) (1947–2024), English rock drummer
- Gary Conway (born 1936), American screenwriter and actor

== See also ==
- Jerry Conway (1901–1980), American baseball player
