= Rube DeGroff =

American baseball player (1879–1955)

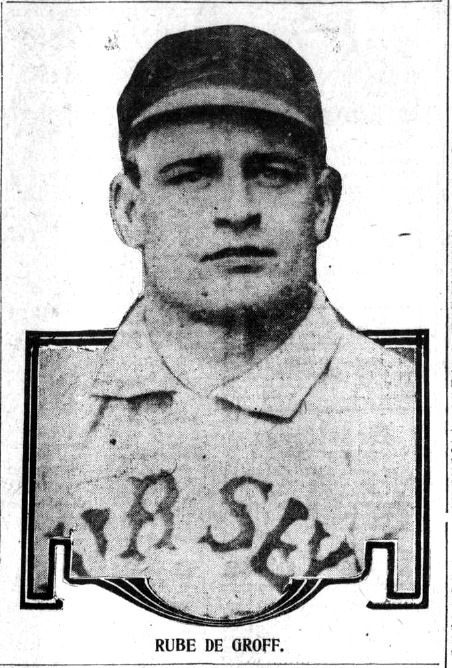
- Outfielder
- Born: September 2, 1879; Hyde Park, New York, U.S.
- Died: December 17, 1955 (aged 76); Poughkeepsie, New York, U.S.
- Batted: Left Threw: Left

MLB debut
- September 22, 1905, for the St. Louis Cardinals

Last MLB appearance
- April 29, 1906, for the St. Louis Cardinals

MLB statistics
- Batting average: .233
- Home runs: 0
- Runs batted in: 5
- Stats at Baseball Reference

Teams
- St. Louis Cardinals (1905–1906)

Arthur Sleight "Rube" DeGroff (September 2, 1879 – December 17, 1955) was an American professional baseball outfielder from 1903 to 1916. He played two seasons in Major League Baseball for the St. Louis Cardinals. DeGroff was 5 feet, 11 inches tall and weighed 190 pounds.

== Career ==
DeGroff was born in Hyde Park, New York, in 1879. He started his professional baseball career in 1903 with the Hudson River League's Kingston Colonials where he proved to be very popular. The Democrat and Chronicle reported that "the younger element of the Hudson [R]iver ball fields ... love him and worship him as a sort of baseball demi-god." He spent the 1903–04 offseason playing winter ball in Cuba. In 1905, he joined the New York State League's Troy Trojans and had a batting average of .315. DeGroff made his major league debut with the St. Louis Cardinals in September of that year, and in 15 games, he batted .250. He also appeared in one game for the Cardinals in 1906 before going back to the Trojans. That was the last time he played in the majors.

In 1906 and 1907, DeGroff batted .314 for Troy. He led the league in hits during both of those seasons. DeGroff then went to the Eastern League for one year, batted .255, and returned to the New York State League in 1909 where he led all players with 10 home runs.

DeGroff hit under .250 in 1910 and 1911. Upon joining the New England League's Lowell Grays in 1912, however, he had one of his best years at the plate. He batted .348, setting his career-high in that category, and led the league in hits, doubles, triples, home runs, slugging percentage, and total bases. In 1913, his batting average went down to .299, but he paced the circuit in home runs again.

DeGroff played one more season for Lowell and then two in the New York State League before his professional baseball career ended. He later managed a team in Hyde Park called the Robin Hoods. In 1936, US president Franklin D. Roosevelt (who was also born in Hyde Park) attended a Robin Hoods game and told the crowd that he and DeGroff used to play on the same baseball team.

On December 16, 1955, DeGroff was driving on U.S. Route 9 to his job as a night watchman at a manufacturing plant when he was hit head-on by a driver who had been drinking. He died at the hospital early next morning, aged 76.
