= Saugerties =

Saugerties may refer to:

- Saugerties, New York, United States, a town
  - Saugerties (village), New York
  - Saugerties South, New York
  - West Saugerties, New York
- Saugerties (baseball), a minor league baseball team 1903–1905
