= Jay Kirke =

American baseball player (1888–1968)

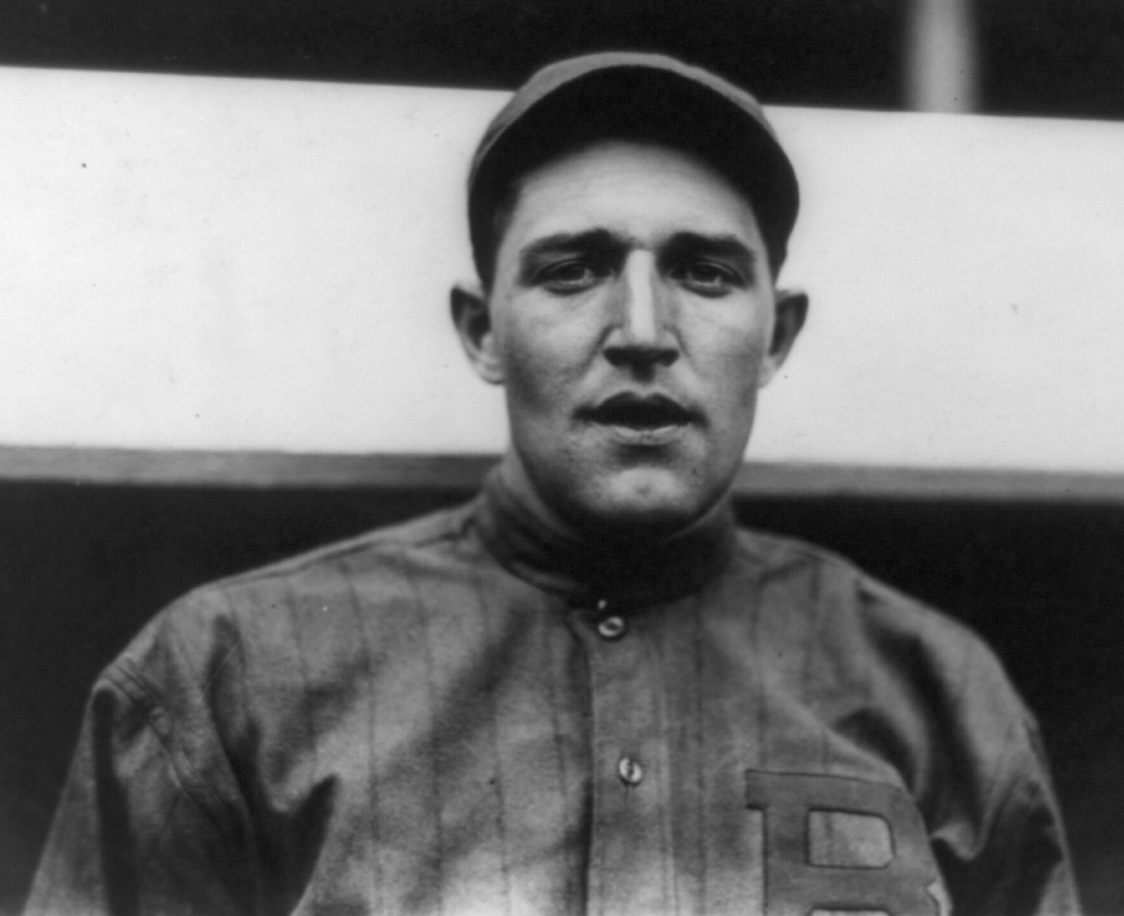
- First baseman / Outfielder
- Born: June 16, 1888; Fleischmanns, New York, U.S.
- Died: August 31, 1968 (aged 80); New Orleans, Louisiana, U.S.
- Batted: Left Threw: Right

MLB debut
- September 28, 1910, for the Detroit Tigers

Last MLB appearance
- September 2, 1918, for the New York Giants

MLB statistics
- Batting average: .301
- Home runs: 7
- Runs batted in: 148
- Stats at Baseball Reference

Teams
- Detroit Tigers (1910); Boston Rustlers / Braves (1911–1913); Cleveland Naps / Indians (1914–1915); New York Giants (1918)

Judson Fabian Kirke (June 16, 1888 – August 31, 1968) was an American professional baseball first baseman.

Kirke played baseball locally around Fleischmanns, New York before signing with the Kingston Colonials of the Hudson River League and thereafter progressing through the minor leagues.

He played in Major League Baseball (MLB) from 1910 through 1918 for the Detroit Tigers, Boston Rustlers / Braves, Cleveland Naps / Indians, and New York Giants. In 1,148 big league at bats, Kirke had a solid career batting average of .301 while playing seven different positions, primarily first base. Kirke enjoyed a long minor league career after his final stint in the big leagues with the New York Giants.

While playing in the minor leagues with the Louisville Colonels with player-manager Joe McCarthy, Kirke told McCarthy that, as a player, McCarthy did not "look so good" to his fellow ballplayers. McCarthy credited Kirke's remark with inspiring him to quit playing and focus instead on managing. McCarthy would go on to be inducted into the Baseball Hall of Fame as a manager.

After a long and successful career as both a minor league player and manager, Kirke moved to New Orleans while his son, Judson, played and managed in the minors.
