= Hudson Marines =

- 1903–1907; Hudson, New York

Minor league affiliations
- Class: Class D (1903); Class C (1904–1907)
- League: Hudson River League (1903–1907)

Major league affiliations
- Team: None

Minor league titles
- League titles (1): 1905

Team data
- Name: Hudson Marines (1903–1907)
- Ballpark: Unknown (1903–1907)

The Hudson Marines were a minor league baseball team based in Hudson, New York. From 1903 to 1907, the Marines played exclusively as members of the Hudson River League, managed by Augie Schnack each season. The Marines captured the 1905 Hudson River League championship.

== History ==
Minor league baseball began in Hudson, New York in 1896, when the "Hudson" team played as members of the independent, non–classified, eight–team Hudson River League. League records and standings are unknown.

In 1903, the Hudson "Marines" became members of the reformed Class D level Hudson River League. The Kingston Colonials, Newburgh Taylor-mades, Ossining, Peekskill, Poughkeepsie Colts and Saugerties, New York teams joined Hudson in league play.

In their first season of play, the 1903 Hudson Marines placed second in the Hudson River League final standings. Hudson ended the season with a record of 63–33 as Augie Schnack served as manager, beginning a five-year tenure as the manager of the Hudson Marines. The Marines finished 1.5 games behind the first place Kingston Colonials in the standings. The Hudson River League did not hold playoffs for the duration of the Hudson Marines' tenure in the league.

The 1904 Hudson Marines placed third as the six–team Hudson River League, which was elevated to a Class C level league. After beginning league play on May 11, 1905, the Marines compiled a final record of 68–52 under returning manager Augie Schnack. The Marines finished 3.5 games behind the first place Poughkeepsie Colts in the final league standings.

The Hudson Marines won the 1905 Hudson River League championship. With a record of 68–50, the Hudson Marines placed first in the Hudson River League final standings, winning the championship under the direction of managers Augie Schnack and David Patterson. The Marines finished 1.5 games ahead of the Paterson Invaders in the final standings of the eight–team league.

The Hudson Marines continued play in the 1906 Hudson River League. With a record of 54–56, the Hudson Marines placed fourth in the eight–team league, led again by manager Augie Schnack. On September 9, 1906, Hudson was 9.5 games behind the first place Paterson Invaders when the Hudson River League ceased play for the season.

The Class C level Hudson River League resumed play to begin the 1907 season, but folded during their final season. On June 18, 1907, the Hudson Marines were in third place when the six–team Hudson River League permanently folded. The Hudson River league was down to four remaining teams, after having the Kingston and Paterson franchises fold in early June. The Hudson Marines were again managed by Augie Schnack and had a 12–12 record when the league folded. The Hudson Marines finished 1.5 games behind the 1st place Poughkeepsie Colts as the league folded.

Hudson, New York has not hosted another minor league team.

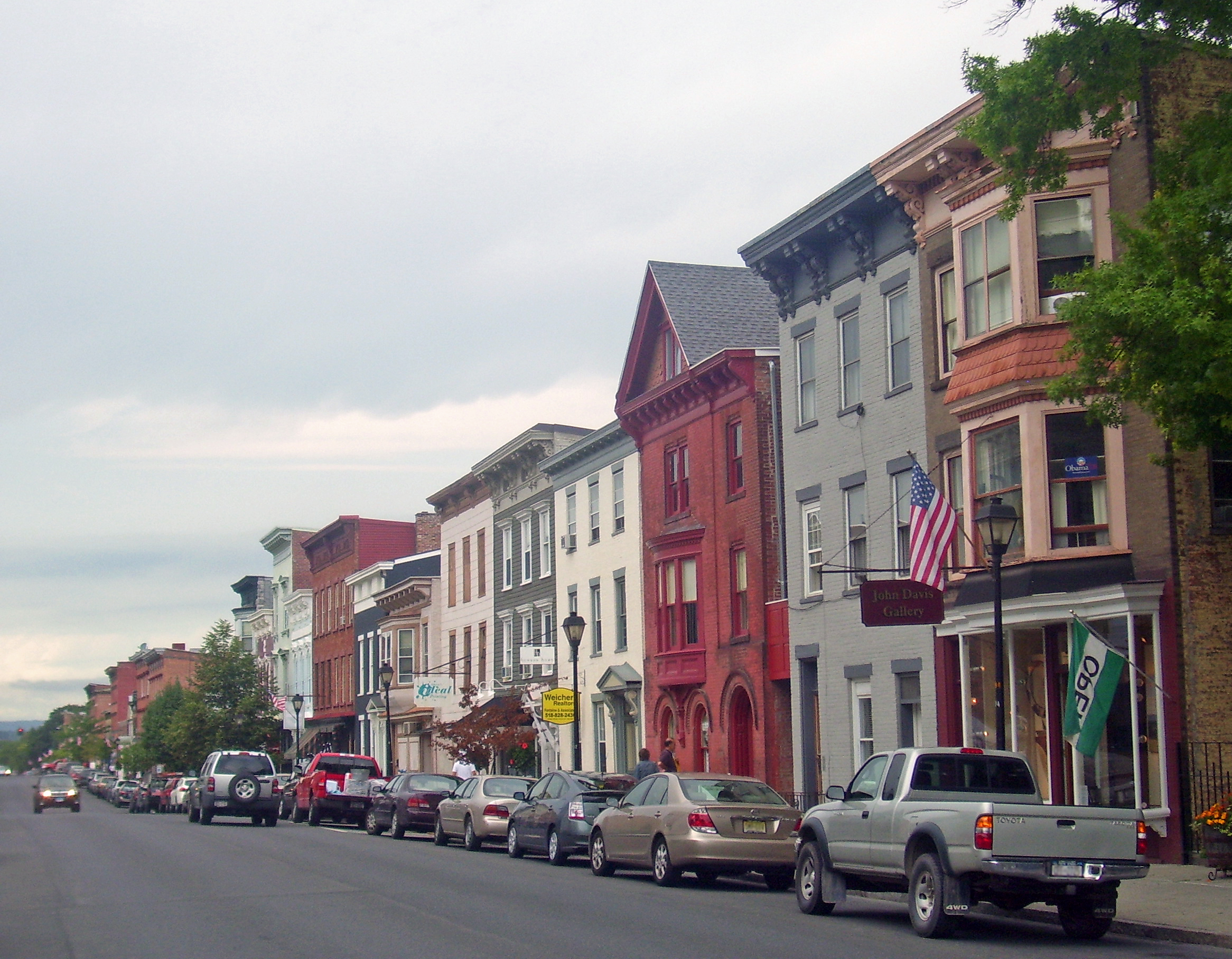
(2008) Warren Street west view. National Register of Historic Places. Hudson, New York

== The ballpark ==
The name of the Hudson Marines' home minor league ballpark between 1903 and 1907 is not directly referenced. Oakdale Park in Hudson was in use in the era as a public park. Oakdale Park is still in use today as a public park, located on North 6th street, adjacent to Oakdale Lake.

== Timeline ==
Year(s)	# Yrs.	Team	Level	League
1903	1	Hudson Marines	Class D	Hudson River League
1904–1907	4	Hudson Marines	Class C	Hudson River League

== Year–by–year records ==
Year	Record	Finish	Manager	Playoffs/Notes
1903	63–33	2nd	Augie Schnack	No playoffs held
1904	68–52	3rd	Augie Schnack	No playoffs held
1905	68–50	1st	Augie Schnack / David Patterson	League champions
1906	54–56	4th	Augie Schnack	No playoffs held
1907	12–12	3rd	Augie Schnack	League folded June 18

=== Notable alumni ===
- Bill Leard (1906)
- Hudson Marines players
