= Asbury Park Sea Urchins =

- 1914; (1897, 1914); Asbury Park, New Jersey

Minor league affiliations
- Class: Class D (1897, 1914)
- League: New Jersey State League (1897); Atlantic League (1914)

Major league affiliations
- Team: None

Minor league titles
- League titles (0): None

Team data
- Name: Asbury Park (1897); Asbury Park Sea Urchins (1914)
- Ballpark: Unknown (1897, 1914)

The Asbury Park Sea Urchins were a minor league baseball team based in Asbury Park, New Jersey. In 1914, the "Urchins" played a partial season as members of the Class D level Atlantic League. An Asbury Park team previously played the 1897 season as members of the Class D level New Jersey State League.

== History ==
Minor league baseball play began in Asbury Park, New Jersey in 1897, when the Asbury Park team played as members of the 1897 New Jersey State League. The league was a four–team Class D level league. The New Jersey State League was formed with teams based in Atlantic City, New Jersey, Bridgeton, New Jersey and Millville, New Jersey joining Asbury Park as charter members.

After beginning play on April 14, 1897, the New Jersey State League season ended on June 1, 1897. The player statistics and team standings from the 1897 league are unknown, Asbury Park included. One source lists the teams in the order of: Bridgeton, Millville, Asbury Park and Atlantic City, but without records to align with the order. The New Jersey State League permanently folded after the 1897 season.

Minor league baseball returned in 1914, with Asbury Park gaining a team during the season. The Asbury Park "Sea Urchins" began play after joining the 1914 Atlantic League during the season. The 1914 Atlantic League was an eight–team Class D level minor league baseball league. The league had been known as the New York–New Jersey League a season earlier. The Atlantic League president was Rosslyn M. Cox, who would later serve as the mayor of Middletown, New York. The league began play on May 20, 1914, and concluded the season with Asbury Park as a member on September 7, 1914.

On July 2, 1914, Asbury Park reestablished a team when the Bloomfield–Long Branch Cubans of Bloomfield, New Jersey and Long Branch, New Jersey relocated and finished the season as the Asbury Park "Sea Urchins." Bloomfield–Long Branch was 15–22 when they relocated to Asbury Park. The team ended the season with an overall record of 30–59, finishing 31.0 games behind the first place Poughkeepsie Honey Bugs and in eighth place in the eight–team league. The managers were Andy Coakley and Sam Jaeger. Twin brothers Joe Shannon and Maurice Red Shannon made their professional debuts playing for the Asbury Park Sea Urchins under assumed names (Maurice and Joe O'Brien) in 1914, doing so to protect their college eligibility at Seton Hall College. The Poughkeepsie Honey Bugs finished in 1st place with a record of 65–31 and there was no postseason. The Atlantic League had financial difficulties and folded before it could play the 1915 season.

Asbury Park, New Jersey has not hosted another minor league team.

== The ballpark ==
The name and location of the Asbury Park home minor league ballpark in 1897 and 1914 is unknown.

The New York Yankees later held spring training in Asbury Park in 1943 en route to winning the 1943 World Series. The Yankees utilized the baseball facilities at Asbury Park High School (seating capacity was 7,500) and stayed at the Albion Hotel in Asbury Park.

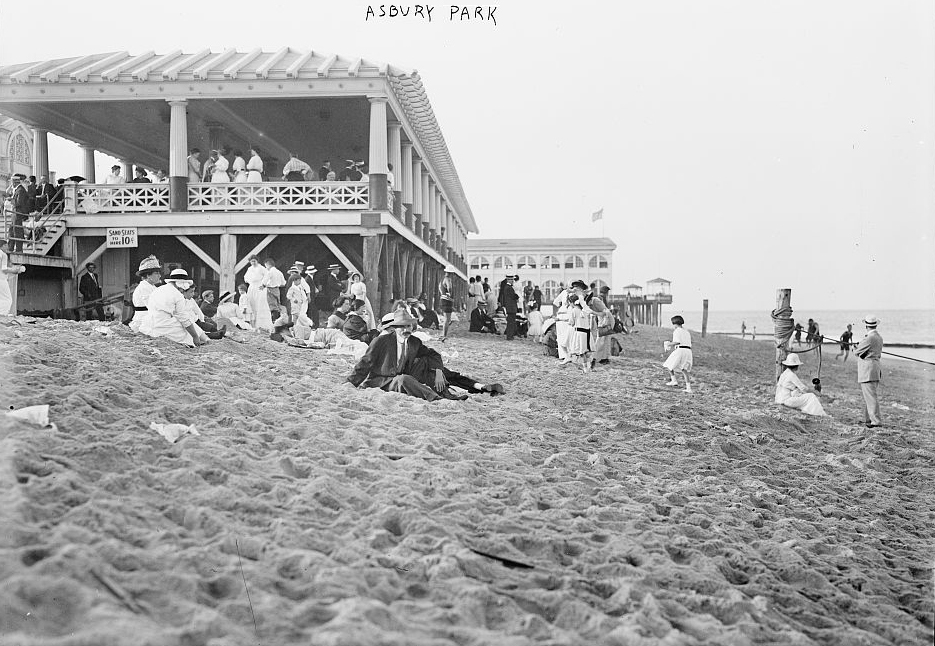
Asbury Park beach, early twentieth century

== Timeline ==
Year(s)	# Yrs.	Team	Level	League
1897	1	Asbury Park	Class D	New Jersey State League
1914	1	Asbury Park Sea Urchins	Class D	Atlantic League

== Year–by–year record ==
Year	Record	Finish	Manager	Playoffs/Notes
1897	00–00	3rd*	NA	league records unknown
1914	30–59	8th	Andy Coakley / Sam Jaeger	Bloomfield–Long Branch moved to Asbury Park July 2; 15–27 record in Asbury Park

== Notable alumni ==
- Andy Coakley (1914, MGR)
- Joe Shannon (1914)
- Red Shannon (1914)

== See also ==
- Asbury Park Sea Urchins players
