= Fidelio Hungo =

Cuban baseball player

- Infielder
- Born: January 12, 1893; Regla, Cuba
- Died: December 5, 1980 (aged 87); Los Angeles, California, U.S.
- Batted: Right Threw: Right

Negro league baseball debut
- 1915, for the Long Branch Cubans

Last appearance
- 1916, for the Long Branch Cubans

Teams
- Long Branch Cubans (1915–1916)

Fidelio A. Hungo Rodríguez (January 12, 1893 – December 5, 1980) was a Cuban infielder in the Negro leagues and the Cuban League in the 1910s and 1920s.

== Career ==
A native of Regla, Cuba, Hungo played in the Negro leagues for the Long Branch Cubans in 1915 and 1916. He also played several seasons in the Cuban League between 1913 and 1921 for the Almendares and Habana clubs. In 1923, Hungo played minor league baseball with the Tampa Smokers.

== Death ==
He died in Los Angeles, California in 1980 at age 87.
