= Ed Johnson (baseball) =

American baseball player (1899–1975)

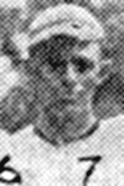
- Right fielder
- Born: March 31, 1899; Morganfield, Kentucky, U.S.
- Died: July 3, 1975 (aged 76); Morganfield, Kentucky, U.S.
- Batted: Left Threw: Right

MLB debut
- September 26, 1920, for the Washington Senators

Last MLB appearance
- October 3, 1920, for the Washington Senators

MLB statistics
- Batting average: .231
- Home runs: 0
- Runs batted in: 2
- Stats at Baseball Reference

Teams
- Washington Senators (1920)

Edwin Cyril Johnson (March 31, 1899 – July 3, 1975) was an American Major League Baseball (MLB) right fielder who played for the Washington Senators in 1920.
