= Juan Violá =

Cuban baseball player (1883–1919)

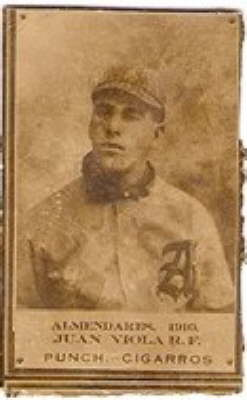
- Outfielder / Third baseman / First baseman
- Born: 1883; Havana, Cuba
- Died: 1919
- Batted: Right Threw: Right
- Stats at Baseball Reference

Member of the Cuban

Baseball Hall of Fame
- Induction: 1953

Juan Violá (1883–1919) was a Cuban professional baseball outfielder, third baseman and first baseman in the Cuban League, Negro leagues and minor leagues. He played from 1902 to 1915 with several ballclubs, including Almendares, the Habana club, the Long Branch Cubans, and the Jacksonville Jays. He was elected to the Cuban Baseball Hall of Fame in 1953.

In newspaper articles, Violat was called “Viola” in the US and “Violá” in Cuba. In his declaration of intention for US naturalization he gave his full name as Juan Violat Piedra. His parents were Luis Violat and Cristina Piedra.
