= Leon Carlson =

American baseball player (1895-1961)

- Pitcher
- Born: February 17, 1895; Jamestown, New York
- Died: September 15, 1961 (aged 66); Jamestown, New York
- Batted: Right Threw: Right

MLB debut
- May 31, 1920, for the Washington Senators

Last MLB appearance
- June 15, 1920, for the Washington Senators

MLB statistics
- Win–loss record: 0–0
- Strikeouts: 3
- Earned run average: 3.65
- Stats at Baseball Reference

Teams
- Washington Senators (1920)

Leon Alton Carlson (February 17, 1895 – September 15, 1961), nicknamed "Swede", was a professional baseball pitcher. He pitched in three games in Major League Baseball for the Washington Senators in 1920, all in relief.
