= Joe Gleason =

American baseball player (1895-1990)

- Pitcher
- Born: July 9, 1895; Phelps, New York, U.S.
- Died: September 8, 1990 (aged 95); Phelps, New York, U.S.
- Batted: Right Threw: Right

MLB debut
- September 11, 1920, for the Washington Senators

Last MLB appearance
- June 11, 1922, for the Washington Senators

MLB statistics
- Win–loss record: 2-2
- Earned run average: 6.10
- Strikeouts: 14
- Stats at Baseball Reference

Teams
- Washington Senators (1920, 1922)

Joseph Paul Gleason (July 9, 1895 – September 8, 1990) was an American pitcher in Major League Baseball. He pitched in parts of two seasons for the Washington Senators.

Gleason began his professional career with the New Bedford Whalers of the Class C Colonial League in 1914. After his appearances with the Washington Senators, he played minor league baseball for several more years, ending his career with the Scranton Miners and Elmira Colonels of the New York–Pennsylvania League in 1931.
