= Tomás Romañach =

Cuban baseball player

- Shortstop
- Born: 1890; Cuba
- Died: Unknown
- Batted: Right Threw: Right

Cuban League debut
- 1908, for the Rojo

Last appearance
- 1918, for the Habana
- Stats at Baseball Reference

Teams
- Rojo (1908); Almendares (1910–1914); Newark/Long Branch Cubans (1914–1915); Habana (1914–1916); Jersey City-Poughkeepsie Cubans (1916); Orientals (1916–1917); Habana (1918–1919)

Member of the Cuban

Baseball Hall of Fame
- Induction: 1948

Tomás Romañach (1890 – death date unknown) was a Cuban professional baseball shortstop in the Cuban League, Negro leagues and minor leagues. He played from 1908 to 1916 with several clubs, including Almendares, Habana, the Long Branch Cubans, and the Cuban Stars (East). Romañach was nicknamed "El Italiano". He was elected to the Cuban Baseball Hall of Fame in 1948.
