= Sandy McDermott =

American baseball player (1856–1922)

- Second baseman
- Born: March 15, 1856; Zanesville, Ohio, U.S.
- Died: November 23, 1922 (aged 66); Mansfield, Ohio, U.S.
- Batted: Unknown Threw: Unknown

MLB debut
- June 18, 1885, for the Baltimore Orioles

Last MLB appearance
- June 18, 1885, for the Baltimore Orioles

MLB statistics
- Games played: 1
- At bats: 0
- Stats at Baseball Reference

Teams
- Baltimore Orioles (1885)

Thomas Nathaniel "Sandy" McDermott (March 15, 1856 – November 23, 1922) was an American professional baseball player. He appeared in one game in Major League Baseball as a second baseman for the Baltimore Orioles on June 18, 1885 but never had an at bat. He had an extensive career in the minor leagues that lasted through 1897, including four seasons with the Fall River Indians in the New England League. He also managed the Poughkeepsie Colts in the Hudson River League in the 1903 season.

He died in 1922 in Mansfield, Ohio of stomach cancer.
