= Elmer Bowman =

American baseball player (1897–1985)

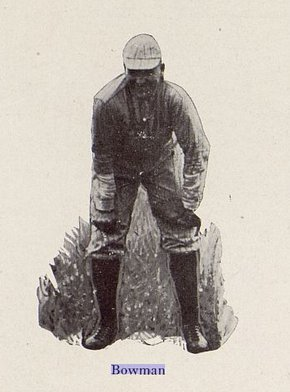
- First baseman
- Born: March 19, 1897; Proctor, Vermont, U.S.
- Died: December 17, 1985 (aged 88); Los Angeles, California, U.S.
- Batted: Right Threw: Right

MLB debut
- August 3, 1920, for the Washington Senators

Last MLB appearance
- August 9, 1920, for the Washington Senators

MLB statistics
- Batting average: .000
- Home runs: 0
- Runs batted in: 0
- Stats at Baseball Reference

Teams
- Washington Senators (1920)

Elmari Wilhelm Bowman (March 19, 1897 – December 17, 1985) was an American Major League Baseball player for the Washington Senators in August 1920. The 23-year-old rookie made two pinch-hitting appearances for the Senators and did not play in the field, so his position is not known.

Both of Bowman's appearances took place on the road. His major league debut on August 3, 1920 was against the Cleveland Indians at League Park. His second and last appearance, six days later, was against the Chicago White Sox at Comiskey Park. Bowman was 0-for-1 with a walk in his two games, giving him an on-base percentage of .500. He also scored one run.

Bowman died in Los Angeles, at the age of 88.
