= Duke Shirey =

American baseball player (1898-1962)

- Pitcher
- Born: July 20, 1898; Jersey Shore, Pennsylvania, U.S.
- Died: September 1, 1962 (aged 64); Hagerstown, Maryland, U.S.
- Batted: Right Threw: Right

MLB debut
- September 28, 1920, for the Washington Senators

Last MLB appearance
- October 3, 1920, for the Washington Senators

MLB statistics
- Win–loss record: 0–1
- Earned run average: 6.75
- Strikeouts: 0
- Stats at Baseball Reference

Teams
- Washington Senators (1920)

Clair Lee "Duke" Shirey (June 20, 1898 – September 1, 1962) was an American Major League Baseball pitcher who played for the Washington Senators in 1920.
