= Bill Hollahan =

American baseball player (1896-1965)

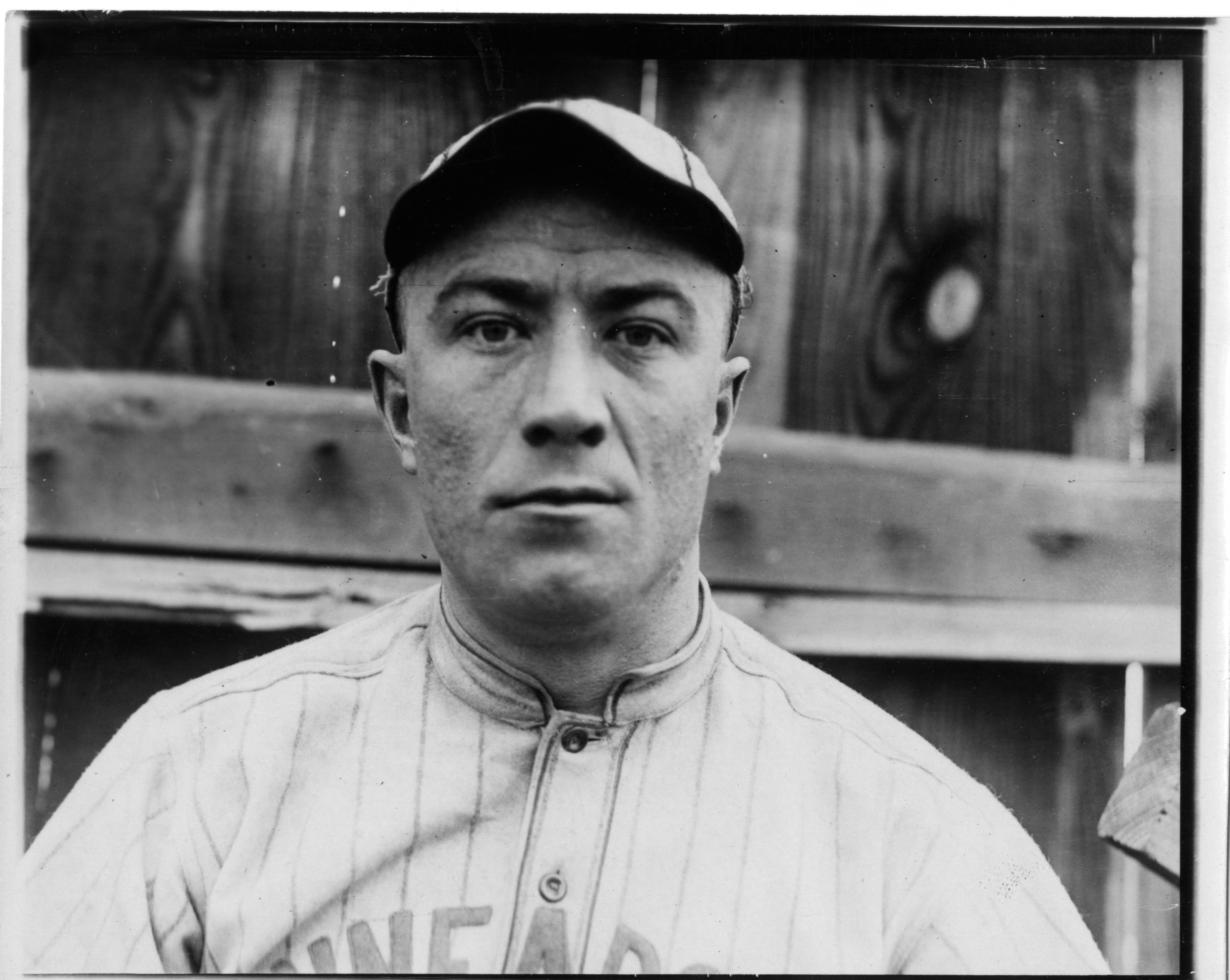
- Third baseman
- Born: November 22, 1896; New York City, U.S.
- Died: November 27, 1965 (aged 69); New York City, U.S.
- Batted: Right Threw: Right

MLB debut
- September 27, 1920, for the Washington Senators

Last MLB appearance
- October 3, 1920, for the Washington Senators

MLB statistics
- Games played: 3
- At bats: 4
- Hits: 1
- Stats at Baseball Reference

Teams
- Washington Senators (1920)

William James Hollahan (November 22, 1896 – November 27, 1965) was an American third baseman in Major League Baseball. He played for the Washington Senators.
