= Gus Bono =

American baseball player (1894-1948)

- Pitcher
- Born: August 29, 1894; Doe Run, Missouri
- Died: December 3, 1948 (aged 54); Dearborn, Michigan
- Batted: Right Threw: Right

MLB debut
- September 13, 1920, for the Washington Senators

Last MLB appearance
- October 3, 1920, for the Washington Senators

MLB statistics
- Win–loss record: 0–2
- Earned run average: 8.76
- Strikeouts: 4
- Stats at Baseball Reference

Teams
- Washington Senators (1920)

Adlai Wendell "Gus" Bono (August 29, 1894 – December 3, 1948) was a pitcher in Major League Baseball. He played one season for the Washington Senators.
