= Dick Cogan =

American baseball player and manager (1871–1948)

- Pitcher / Outfielder
- Born: December 5, 1871; Paterson, New Jersey, U.S.
- Died: May 2, 1948 (aged 76); Paterson, New Jersey, U.S.
- Batted: Right Threw: Right

MLB debut
- May 10, 1897, for the Baltimore Orioles

Last MLB appearance
- June 25, 1900, for the New York Giants

MLB statistics
- Win–loss record: 2-3
- Earned run average: 5.00
- Strikeouts: 10
- Stats at Baseball Reference

Teams
- Baltimore Orioles (1897); Chicago Orphans (1899); New York Giants (1900)

Richard Henry Cogan (December 5, 1871 – May 2, 1948) was an American professional baseball player and manager who played three seasons in the major leagues. He was 5 feet, 7 inches tall and weighed 150 pounds.

== Career ==
Cogan was born in Paterson, New Jersey, in 1871. He started his professional baseball career in 1894 in the Virginia League and then moved on to the New York State League the following season. In 1896, he pitched 344 innings for the Atlantic League's Paterson Silk Weavers, going 21–21 with a 2.27 earned run average. Cogan played one game for the major league Baltimore Orioles on May 10, 1897, and gave up three earned runs in two innings. He finished the season back in the Atlantic League with the Newark Colts and went 20-11 there.

Cogan stayed with the Colts in 1898 and 1899. In 1899, he went 16–8 on the mound. He also played in the outfield and at third base and batted .306. Cogan received his second shot in the National League that year, with the Chicago Orphans. He made five starts for Chicago and went 2–3 with a 4.30 ERA. He stayed in the majors in 1900, playing for the New York Giants, but only appeared in two games for them. His final MLB appearance was on June 25.

Cogan went back to the minors in 1901. In 1903, he was a player-manager for the Eastern League's Providence Grays. He then organized the Hudson River League in 1904, and he played for and managed the circuit's Paterson Intruders club until 1907. Later, he organized and managed a Negro team called the Dick Cogan Smart Sets.

Cogan died in Paterson in 1948. He was buried in the Holy Sepulchre Cemetery in Totowa, New Jersey.
