= Ricardo Torres (baseball) =

Cuban baseball player (1891-1960)

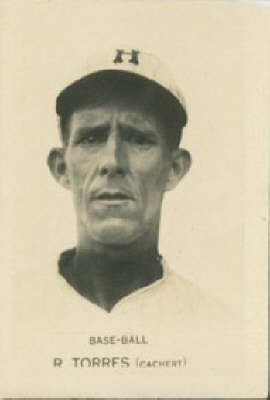
- Catcher / First baseman
- Born: April 16, 1891; Regla, Cuba
- Died: April 17, 1960 (aged 69); Regla, Cuba
- Batted: Right Threw: Right

MLB debut
- May 18, 1920, for the Washington Senators

Last MLB appearance
- August 15, 1922, for the Washington Senators
- Stats at Baseball Reference

Teams
- Cuban League: Habana (1913-1915, 1918, 1920, 1922, 1927); Orientals (1916); Negro leagues: Long Branch Cubans (1915); Major League Baseball: Washington Senators (1920–1922)

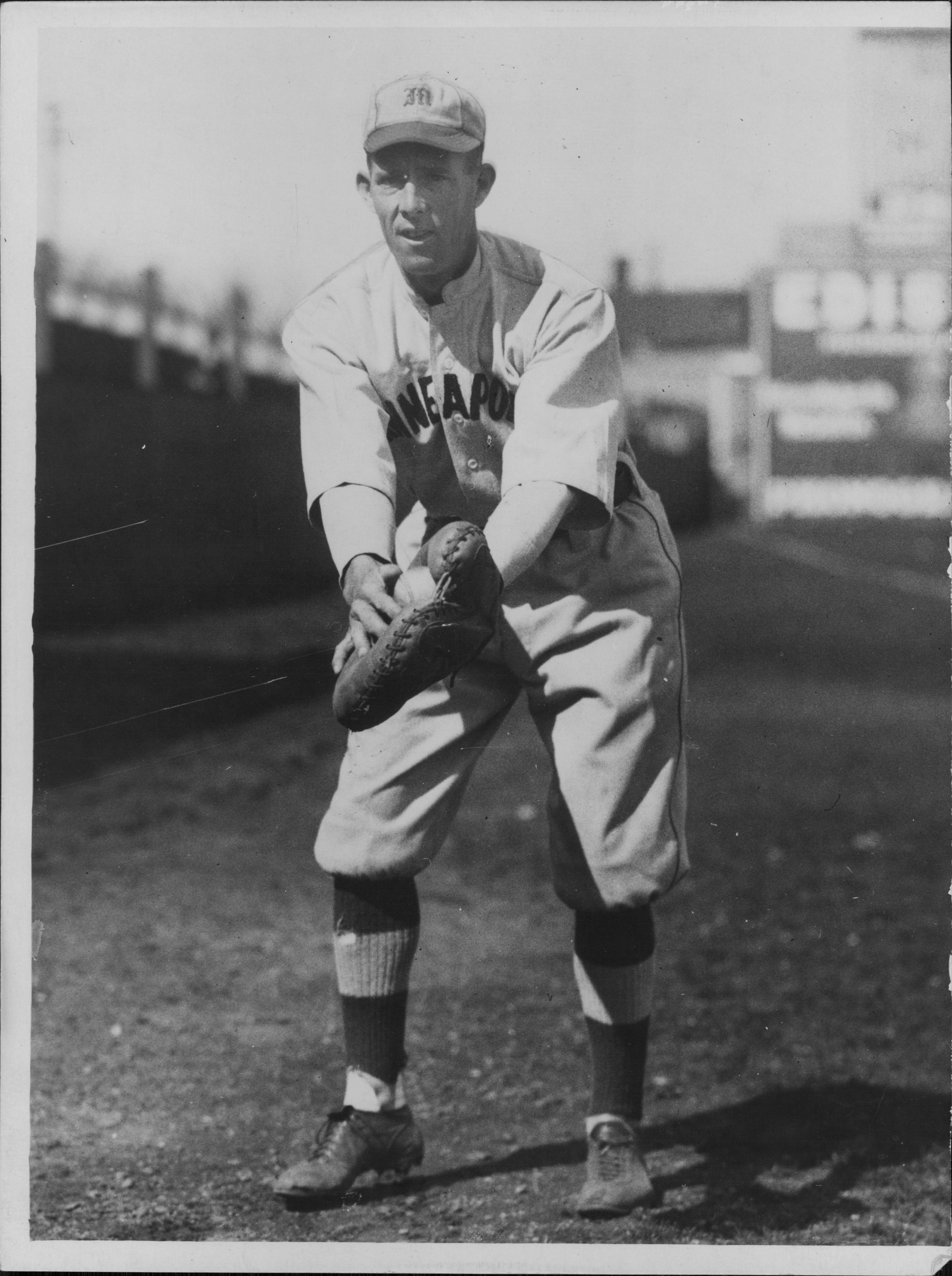
Ricardo Torres with the Minneapolis Millers, date unknown

Ricardo J. Torres Martinez (April 16, 1891 – April 17, 1960) was a Cuban professional baseball catcher and first baseman in the Cuban League, Negro league baseball, and Major League Baseball (MLB).

In 22 games over three major league seasons, Torres posted a .297 batting average (11-for-37) with nine runs and three runs batted in. He recorded a .983 fielding percentage playing nine games at catcher and seven games at first base.

Torres was the father of Gil Torres.
