= Jack Calvo =

Cuban baseball player (1894-1965)

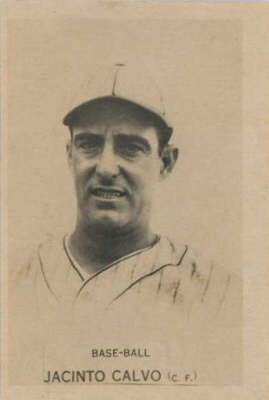
- Outfielder
- Born: June 11, 1894; Havana, Cuba
- Died: June 15, 1965 (aged 71); Miami, Florida, U.S.
- Batted: Right Threw: Right

MLB debut
- May 9, 1913, for the Washington Senators

Last MLB appearance
- June 28, 1920, for the Washington Senators

MLB statistics
- Batting average: .161
- Home runs: 1
- Runs batted in: 4
- Stats at Baseball Reference

Teams
- Washington Senators (1913, 1920)

Member of the Cuban

Baseball Hall of Fame
- Induction: 1948

Jacinto "Jack" Calvo González (June 11, 1894 – June 15, 1965) was born Jacinto Del Calvo in Havana, Cuba. He was an outfielder for the Washington Senators in 1913 and 1920. He played in 34 games, had 56 at bats, 10 runs, 9 hits, 1 triple, 1 home run, 4 RBIs, 3 walks, a .161 batting average, a .203 on-base percentage, a .250 slugging percentage, 67 total bases and 19 sacrifices. He died in Miami, Florida.

Calvo played Negro league baseball with the integrated Long Branch Cubans in 1913 and 1915 but most of his baseball career was in Cuba. He was the younger brother of fellow Negro leaguer Tomás Calvo. Calvo played winter baseball in the Cuban League from 1913 to 1927 and was elected to the Cuban Baseball Hall of Fame in 1948.
