= Hudson River League =

- Classification: Independent (1886); Class D (1903); Class C (1904–1907)
- Sport: Minor League Baseball
- First season: 1886
- Folded: June 18, 1907
- President: Henry B. Lawson (1886); Henry D. Ramsey (1903); C.S. Harvey (1903–1907)
- No. of teams: 13
- Country: United States of America
- Most titles: 3 Poughkeepsie/Poughkeepsie Colts
- Related competitions: New York State League

The Hudson River League was formed in 1903 as a class D minor baseball league after playing one season in 1886. Upgraded to Class C the next season, it continued through 1907 before collapsing. There were twelve cities that represented the league during the five-year run; eleven came from New York State and one each at various points from New Jersey and Massachusetts. The Poughkeepsie Colts became the only team to win more than one league title, taking home the league crown in 1886, 1904 and 1907. The "HR" league disbanded June 18, 1907 and did not attempt a comeback the next season.

== Cities represented ==
- Albany, NY: Albany Senators 1886
- Catskill, NY: Catskill 1903
- Glens Falls, NY & Saratoga Springs, NY: Glens Falls-Saratoga Springs 1906
- Hudson, NY: Hudson Marines 1903–1907
- Kingston, NY: Kingston 1886; Kingston Colonials 1903–1906; Kingston Colonial Colts 1907
- Newburgh, NY: Newburgh 1886; Newburgh Taylor-mades 1903–1905; Newburgh Hill Climbers 1906; Newburgh Hillies 1907
- Ossining, NY: Ossining 1903
- Paterson, NJ: Paterson Intruders 1904; Paterson Invaders 1905–1906; Paterson Intruders 1907
- Peekskill, NY: Peekskill 1903; Peekskill 1905
- Pittsfield, MA: Pittsfiled Hillies 1905
- Poughkeepsie, NY: Poughkeepsie 1886; Poughkeepsie Colts 1903–1907
- Saratoga Springs, NY: Saratoga Springs 1886
- Saugerties, NY: Saugerties 1903–1905
- Troy, NY: Troy Trojans 1886
- Yonkers, NY: Younkers 1905, 1907

== Standings & statistics ==
=== 1886 ===
1886 Hudson River League

Team standings	W	L	PCT	GB	Managers
Poughkeepsie	47	18	.723	–	Sandy McDermott
Newburgh	37	22	.627	7	Henry Lawson
Kingston	28	34	.452	17½	Zeke Allen
Troy Trojans	20	33	.378	21	James Jackson / Fitzgerald
Saratoga Springs	12	32	.273	24½	Willis Arnold
Albany Senators	0	5	.000	NA	Michael Lawlor

Albany disbanded May 29.

Player statistics
Player	Team	Stat	Tot
Chief Zimmer	Poughkeepsie	BA	.409
Mickey Lehane	Poughkeepsie	Hits	81

=== 1903 Class D ===
1903 Hudson River League

Team standings	W	L	PCT	GB	Managers
Kingston Colonials	63	30	.677	–	Henry Ramsey
Hudson Marines	63	33	.656	1½	Gus Schnack
Peekskill	48	39	.552	12	F. Valentine
Saugerties	48	47	.505	16	Charles Brady
Poughkeepsie Colts	39	51	.433	22½	William McCabe
Newburgh Taylor-mades	37	54	.407	25	Charles Fisher
Ossining / Catskill	22	69	.242	40	J.M. Evans

Ossining (7–37) moved to Catskill August 2; Peekskill entered the league August 10 given same record as Poughkeepsie, 21–24. Peekskill's playing record was 27–15. (officially 48–39.)
No playoffs scheduled and no individual stats available.

=== 1904 Class C ===
1904 Hudson River League

Team standings	W	L	PCT	GB	Managers
Poughkeepsie Colts	70	47	.598	–	William McCabe
Paterson Intruders	70	49	.588	1	Richard Cogan
Hudson Marines	68	52	.567	3½	Gus Schnack
Kingston Colonials	58	58	.500	11½	Henry Ramsey
Saugerties	50	68	.424	20½	John O'Halloran
Newburgh Taylor-mades	39	81	.325	32½	Charles Fisher / John Green; Fred Taylor

Paterson Played some home games at Clifton, NJ
No playoffs were scheduled.

Player statistics
Player	Team	Stat	Tot	Player	Team	Stat	Tot
Dan Brouthers	Poughkeepsie	BA	.373	Dan Brouthers	Poughkeepsie	Hits	158

=== 1905 ===
1905 Hudson River League

Team standings	W	L	PCT	GB	Managers
Hudson Marines	68	50	.576	–	Gus Schnack / Dave Patterson
Paterson Invaders	62	51	.549	1	Richard Cogan
Poughkeepsie Colts	59	52	.532	5½	William McCabe
Newburgh Taylor-mades	60	54	.526	6	Fred Taylor / Henry Ramsey
Kingston Colonials	57	57	.500	9	M.M. Allen / Matt Kelley
Yonkers	10	8	.556	NA	Henry Ramsey
Peekskill	5	13	.278	NA	Walter Dobbins
Saugerties / Pittsfield Hillies	13	49	.210	NA	D.J. Schulman / Daniel Cassiday

Peekskill & Yonkers disbanded June 1.; Saugerties (8–34) moved to Pittsfield July 4; Pittsfield disbanded July 25.
No playoffs were held.

Player statistics
Player	Team	Stat	Tot	Player	Team	Stat	Tot
Joseph McCarthy	Poughkeepsie	BA	.340	Mike O'Malley	Hudson	Hits	144

=== 1906 ===
1906 Hudson River League

Team standings	W	L	PCT	GB	Managers
Paterson Invaders	64	47	.577	–	Richard Cogan
Poughkeepsie Colts	60	45	.571	1	William McCabe
Kingston Colonials	56	51	.523	6	John Cuneo
Hudson Marines	54	56	.491	9½	Gus Schnack
Newburgh Hill Climbers	43	59	.422	16½	Dan Brouthers / Ochs / Taylor / McGratty
Glens Falls-Saratoga Springs	43	62	.410	18	Henry Ramsey

The season was shortened to September 9.

No playoffs were scheduled.

Player statistics
Player	Team	Stat	Tot	Player	Team	Stat	Tot
John Conners	Kingston	BA	.343	John Conners	Kingston	Hits	124

=== 1907 ===
1907 Hudson River League

Team standings	W	L	PCT	GB	Managers
Poughkeepsie Colts	17	10	.630	–	William McCabe
Newburgh Hillies	15	11	.577	1½	Jim Connor
Yonkers	12	12	.500	3½	Jack Lawler
Hudson Marines	12	12	.500	3½	Gus Schnack
Paterson Intruders	4	9	.308	NA	Dick Cogan
Kingston Colonial Colts	4	10	.286	NA	Ryan

Kingston disbanded June 1; Paterson disbanded June 2.
The league disbanded June 18.

== Hall of Fame alumni ==
- Dan Brouthers 1904-1905 Poughkeepsie Colts

== Sources ==
- The Encyclopedia of Minor League Baseball: Second Edition
