= Bob Ganley =

American baseball player (1875–1945)

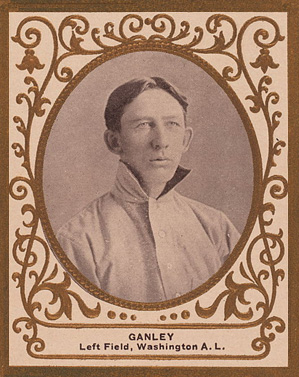
- Outfielder
- Born: April 23, 1875; Lowell, Massachusetts, U.S.
- Died: October 9, 1945 (aged 70); Lowell, Massachusetts, U.S.
- Batted: Left Threw: Left

MLB debut
- September 1, 1905, for the Pittsburgh Pirates

Last MLB appearance
- September 27, 1909, for the Philadelphia Athletics

MLB statistics
- Batting average: .254
- Home runs: 2
- Runs batted in: 123
- Stats at Baseball Reference

Teams
- Pittsburgh Pirates (1905–1906); Washington Senators (1907–1909); Philadelphia Athletics (1909)

Robert Stephen Ganley (April 23, 1875 – October 9, 1945) was an Irish-American professional baseball player who played as an outfielder in Major League Baseball from 1905 through 1909. He played for the Pittsburgh Pirates, Washington Senators and Philadelphia Athletics.

In 572 games over five seasons, Ganley posted a .254 batting average (540-for-2129) with 246 runs, 2 home runs, 123 RBI, 112 stolen bases and 177 bases on balls.
