= Jerry Conway =

American baseball player (1901-1980)

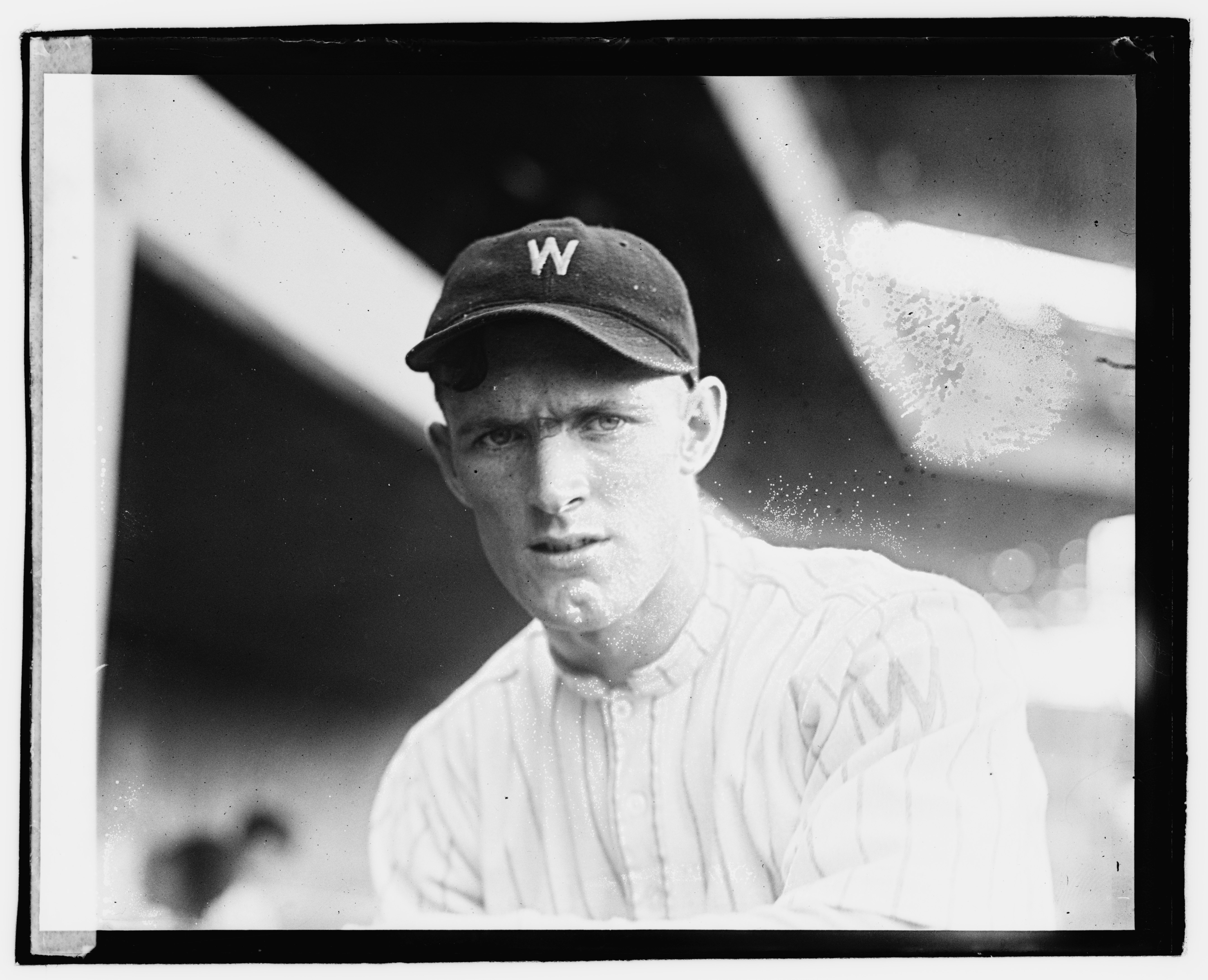
- Pitcher
- Born: June 7, 1901; Holyoke, Massachusetts, U.S.
- Died: April 16, 1980 (aged 78); Holyoke, Massachusetts, U.S.
- Batted: Left Threw: Left

MLB debut
- August 31, 1920, for the Washington Senators

Last MLB appearance
- August 31, 1920, for the Washington Senators

MLB statistics
- Games: 1
- Earned run average: 0.00
- Strikeouts: 0
- Stats at Baseball Reference

Teams
- Washington Senators (1920)

Jerome Patrick Conway (June 7, 1901 – April 16, 1980) was an American Major League Baseball pitcher who played in 1920 with the Washington Senators. He batted and threw left-handed. He would also play professional basketball for the Washington Palace Five team owned by George Preston Marshall from the American Basketball League.

He was born and died in Holyoke, Massachusetts.
