= New York–New Jersey League =

- Classification: Class D (1913)
- Sport: Minor League Baseball
- First season: 1913
- Folded: 1913
- Replaced by: Atlantic League
- President: Rosslyn M. Cox (1913)
- No. of teams: 6
- Country: United States of America
- Most titles: 1 Long Branch Cubans (1913)
- Related competitions: New York State League

The New York–New Jersey League was a class D minor league baseball circuit operated during the 1913 season. With the New York State League and International League already established in the region, the 6–team league did not include any major cities. The following year, the circuit was renamed the Atlantic League.

== Cities represented ==
- Danbury, CT: Danbury Hatters 1913
- Kingston, NY: Kingston Colonials 1913
- Long Branch, NJ: Long Branch Cubans 1913
- Middletown, NY: Middletown Middies 1913
- Newburgh, NY: Newburgh Dutchmen 1913
- Poughkeepsie, NY: Poughkeepsie Honey Bugs 1913

== Standings and statistics ==
=== 1913 New York–New Jersey League ===
Team standings	W	L	PCT	GB	Managers
Long Branch Cubans	65	29	.691	–	Ricardo Henriquez
Poughkeepsie Honey Bugs	48	49	.495	18.5	Eugene Ressique
Kingston Colonials	45	46	.494	18.5	Walter Bennett
Middletown Middies	42	51	.452	22.5	Jack Lawler
Danbury Hatters	43	55	.439	24.0	Ernest Landgraf
Newburgh Dutchmen	41	54	.432	24.5	Archie Marshall

Playoffs: None

Player statistics
Player	Team	Stat	Tot	Player	Team	Stat	Tot
Frank Ely	Middletown	BA	.385	Dolf Luque	Long Branch	W	22
Eugene Ressique	Poughkeepsie	Runs	101	Dolf Luque	Long Branch	Pct	.815; 22–5
Juan Viola	Long Branch	Hits	131	Frank Ely	Middletown	HR	7
Edward Harrison	Newburgh	HR	7				
