= Charlie Meara =

American baseball player (1891–1962)

- Outfielder
- Born: April 16, 1891; New York City, U.S.
- Died: February 8, 1962 (aged 70); Bronx, New York, U.S.
- Batted: Left Threw: Right

MLB debut
- June 1, 1914, for the New York Yankees

Last MLB appearance
- June 7, 1914, for the New York Yankees

MLB statistics
- Batting average: .286
- Home runs: 0
- Runs batted in: 1
- Stats at Baseball Reference

Teams
- New York Yankees (1914)

Charles Edward "Goggy" Meara (April 16, 1891 – February 8, 1962) was an American Major League Baseball outfielder. He was born on April 13, 1891, in New York, New York. He attended college at Manhattan College. Meara played 1 season in 1914 with the New York Yankees and played 4 games. He had 2 hits in 7 at-bats.

Meara died on February 8, 1962, in the Bronx, New York.
