= Desmond Beatty =

American baseball player (1893–1969)

- Born: April 7, 1893; Baltimore, Maryland, U.S.
- Died: October 6, 1969 (aged 76); Norway, Maine, U.S.
- Batted: Right Threw: Right

MLB debut
- September 28, 1914, for the New York Giants

Last MLB appearance
- October 6, 1914, for the New York Giants

MLB statistics
- At bats: 3
- RBI: 1
- Home runs: 0
- Batting average: .000
- Stats at Baseball Reference

Teams
- New York Giants (1914)

"Desperate" Desmond Aloysius Beatty (April 7, 1893 – June 10, 1969) was an American professional baseball player who played two games for the New York Giants. He played one game at shortstop committing three errors and one game at third base.
