= George Lowe (baseball) =

American baseball player (1895–1981)

- Pitcher
- Born: April 25, 1895; Ridgefield Park, New Jersey
- Died: September 3, 1981 (aged 86); Somers Point, New Jersey
- Batted: Right Threw: Right

MLB debut
- July 28, 1920, for the Cincinnati Reds

Last MLB appearance
- July 28, 1920, for the Cincinnati Reds

MLB statistics
- Games played: 1
- Innings pitched: 2
- Earned runs: 0
- Stats at Baseball Reference

Teams
- Cincinnati Reds (1920)

George Wesley Lowe [″Doc″] (April 25, 1895 – September 2, 1981) was a relief pitcher in Major League Baseball who played for the Cincinnati Reds during the 1920 season. Listed at 6 ft 2 in (1.88 m), 180 lb, Lowe batted and threw right-handed. He was born in Ridgefield Park, New Jersey.

== Career ==
Lowe was a major league player whose career, statistically speaking, was only slightly different than that of Eddie Gaedel or Moonlight Graham.

On July 28, 1920, Lowe debuted with Cincinnati in the eight inning of a game against the Brooklyn Robins. In two innings of work, he did not allow a run while giving up one hit and walking one. He did not strike out any and did not have a decision, recording a perfect 0.00 earned run average, but never appeared in a major league game again.

He also played in parts of four minor league seasons between 1914 and 1920, posting a 43–40 record in 107 pitching appearances.

Lowe died in Somers Point, New Jersey, at the age of 86.
