= Danbury Hatters =

- 1887–1914; (1887–1888, 1898, 1913–1914); Danbury, Connecticut

Minor league affiliations
- Previous classes: Class-D (1913–1914); Class-F (1898)
- League: Atlantic League (1914); New York–New Jersey League (1913); Connecticut State League (1888, 1898); Eastern League (1887)

The Danbury Hatters were a minor league baseball team that was located in Danbury, Connecticut and played from 1887 to 1914.
