= José Acosta (baseball) =

Cuban baseball player (1891–1977)

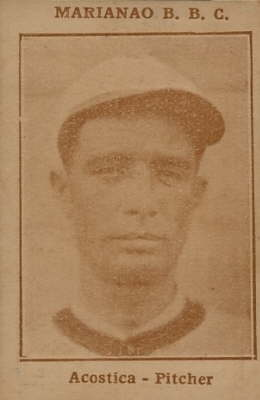
- Pitcher / Outfielder
- Born: March 4, 1891; Havana, Cuba
- Died: November 16, 1977 (aged 86); Havana, Cuba
- Batted: Right Threw: Right

MLB debut
- July 28, 1920, for the Washington Senators

Last MLB appearance
- May 12, 1922, for the Chicago White Sox

MLB statistics
- Win–loss record: 10–10
- Earned run average: 4.51
- Strikeouts: 45
- Stats at Baseball Reference

Teams
- Washington Senators (1920–1921); Chicago White Sox (1922)

Member of the Cuban

Baseball Hall of Fame
- Induction: 1958

José Acosta (March 4, 1891 – November 16, 1977) was a Cuban professional baseball pitcher and outfielder in Major League Baseball (MLB), the Cuban League, the minor leagues, and the Negro leagues who played three seasons for the Chicago White Sox and Washington Senators. Before joining the white minor leagues, he played the 1915 season in the Negro leagues as a member of the integrated Long Branch Cubans.

Acosta played winter baseball in the Cuban League from 1912 to 1930. He led the league in winning percentage five times: in 1914–15, 1915–16, 1917, 1918–19, and 1924–25. He also led the league in wins in 1918–19 and 1920–21. His best season was in 1918–19 when he had a 16–10 record. He was elected to the Cuban Baseball Hall of Fame in 1958.
