= Sam Hope (baseball) =

American baseball player

- Pitcher
- Born: December 4, 1878; Brooklyn, New York, U.S.
- Died: June 30, 1946 (aged 67); Greenport, New York, U.S.
- Batted: Right Threw: Right

MLB debut
- August 5, 1907, for the Philadelphia Athletics

Last MLB appearance
- August 5, 1907, for the Philadelphia Athletics

MLB statistics
- Win–loss record: 0–0
- Earned run average: 0.00
- Strikeouts: 0
- Stats at Baseball Reference

Teams
- Philadelphia Athletics (1907)

Samuel Everett Hope (December 4, 1878 – June 30, 1946) was an American Major League Baseball (MLB) pitcher. He played for the Philadelphia Athletics during the 1907 season.
