= John Ganzel =

American baseball player and manager (1874–1959)

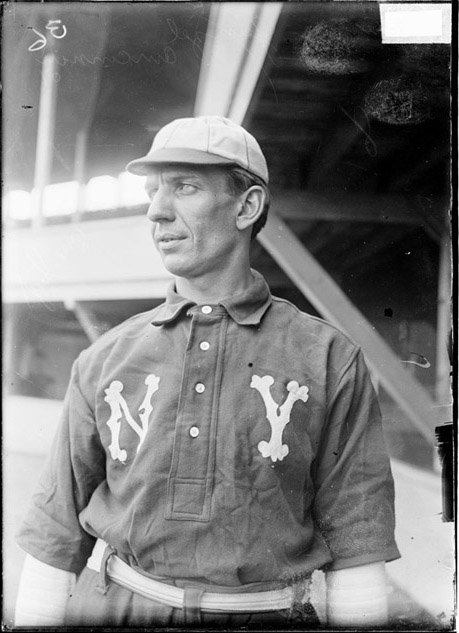
- First baseman / Manager
- Born: April 7, 1874; Kalamazoo, Michigan, U.S.
- Died: January 14, 1959 (aged 84); Orlando, Florida, U.S.
- Batted: Right Threw: Right

MLB debut
- April 21, 1898, for the Pittsburgh Pirates

Last MLB appearance
- September 30, 1908, for the Cincinnati Reds

MLB statistics
- Batting average: .251
- Home runs: 18
- Runs batted in: 336
- Win–loss record: 90–99
- Winning %: .476
- Stats at Baseball Reference

Teams
- As Player: Pittsburgh Pirates (1898); Chicago Orphans (1900); New York Giants (1901); New York Highlanders (1903–1904); Cincinnati Reds (1907–1908); As Manager: Cincinnati Reds (1908)

John Henry Ganzel (April 7, 1874 – January 14, 1959) was an American first baseman and manager in Major League Baseball. Ganzel batted and threw right-handed. He played with the Pittsburgh Pirates (1898), Chicago Cubs (1900), New York Giants (1902) New York Highlanders (1903–1904) and the Cincinnati Reds (1907–1908). Ganzel managed the Reds in 1908 and the Federal League's Brooklyn Tip-Tops in 1915. He hit the first ever Yankee home run on May 11, 1903.

A native of Kalamazoo, Michigan, Ganzel came from a family of baseball men. His brother, Charlie, was a catcher who played with the St. Paul Saints, Philadelphia Phillies, Detroit Wolverines and Boston Beaneaters during 14 seasons, and his nephew Babe Ganzel was an outfielder for the Washington Senators. Two brothers and two nephews also played in the minor leagues.

In a seven-season career, Ganzel was a .251 hitter with 18 home runs and 336 runs batted in during 747 games played. As a manager, he posted a 90–99 record for a .476 winning percentage.

Following his major league career, Ganzel managed several minor league clubs. In 1938 he headed the Orlando franchise of the Florida State League and was active with the club until his retirement in 1952.

Ganzel died at the age 84 of a sudden heart attack at a friend's house in Orlando, Florida on January 14, 1959.

== See also ==
- List of Major League Baseball annual triples leaders
- List of Major League Baseball player-managers
