= Kingston Colonials (baseball) =

- 1885–1951; (1885–1886, 1894, 1903–1907, 1909, 1913, 1947–1951); Kingston, New York

Minor league affiliations
- Previous classes: Class C (1951); Class B (1948–1950); Class D (1913, 1947); Class C (1904–1907); Class D (1903); Class B (1894)
- League: Canadian–American League (1951)
- Previous leagues: Colonial League (1948–1950); North Atlantic League (1947); New York–New Jersey League (1913); Eastern Association (1909); Hudson River League (1903–1907); New York State League (1894); Hudson River League (1885–1886)

Major league affiliations
- Previous teams: Brooklyn Dodgers (1947)

Minor league titles
- League titles: 1 (1903)

Team data
- Previous names: Kingston Colonials (1949–1951); New Brunswick/Kingston Hubs (1948); Kingston Dodgers (1947); Kingston Colonials (1909, 1913); Kingston Colonial Colts (1907); Kingston Colonials (1894, 1903–1906); Kingston Patriarchs (1894); Kingston (1885–1886)
- Previous parks: Dietz Memorial Stadium

The Kingston Colonials were a minor league baseball team that played sporadically between 1885 and 1951.

== Year-by-year record ==
Year	Record	Finish	Manager	Championship
1903	63-30	1st	Henry Ramsey	League Champs
1904	58-58	4th	Henry Ramsey	none
1905	57-57	5th	Henry Ramsey	none
1906	56-51	3rd	John Cuneo	none
1913	45-46	3rd	Walter Bennett	none
1949	39-81	6th	Emil Gall	none
1950	39-28	2nd	Emil Gall	none
1951	33-84	6th	Hank Camelli	none
