= Long Branch Cubans =

- 1913–1916; Long Branch, New Jersey

Minor league affiliations
- Previous classes: D
- League: Atlantic League (1914)
- Previous leagues: New York–New Jersey League (1913)

Minor league titles
- League titles: 1913

Team data
- Previous names: Long Branch Cubans (1913–16); Newark Cubans (1914, first half) Jersey City Cubans (1916, first half)

The Long Branch Cubans (also known as the Newark Cubans and the Jersey City Cubans) were a professional baseball team that played from 1913 to 1916. It was the first U.S. minor league baseball team composed almost entirely of Cubans. Several players, including Dolf Luque and Mike González, went on to play in the major leagues. The Cubans played in Long Branch, New Jersey from 1913 to 1915, except for the first half of the 1914 season, when they played in Newark, New Jersey. In 1916, they started the season playing in Jersey City, New Jersey as the "Jersey City Cubans." Later that summer, they moved their home games to Poughkeepsie, New York, where they were usually referred to as the "Long Branch Cubans." In late July 1916 they briefly moved to Harlem and finally to Madison, New Jersey in August.

From 1913 to 1914, the Cubans played minor league baseball in the Class D New York–New Jersey League, which in 1914 was renamed as the Atlantic League. In accordance with organized baseball's practice of racial segregation, all of the team's players were white. The league folded at the end of the 1914 season, and from 1915 to 1916, the Cubans played independent baseball outside of the organized minor leagues. The 1915 and 1916 teams competed during part of the season in a new, independent Atlantic League, representing Long Branch in 1915 and Poughkeepsie in 1916. When they played in Madison in August 1916, they were competing in the Tri-County League, a short-season, independent professional league that featured both all-white and all-black teams. Because they frequently played against Negro league teams and some of the players may have been multiracial, baseball historians and statistical databases have classified the 1915–16 independent teams as part of Negro league baseball.

Sunday baseball was not yet legal under blue laws in New York City, so major league teams often traveled to the seaside resort community of Long Branch to play Sunday games against the Cubans. According to research by David Skinner, the Cubans' record in these games was 10–24.

== Formation and minor leagues ==
Brothers Carlos and Richard (Ricardo) Henríquez were born in Colombia and immigrated to the United States with their family as children, settling in New York City. In 1911 and 1912, Richard managed and played for an independent baseball team in the New Jersey resort town of Long Branch. In 1912, the team recruited several Cuban players, including Dolf Luque, pitcher, Mike González, catcher, and Tomás Romañach, shortstop.

=== 1913 ===
In 1913, the Long Branch Cubans joined a new Class D minor league, the New Jersey-New York League. Carlos Henríquez was the club president and the league vice-president. His brother Richard was the playing manager. The team was composed of white players, most of them Cubans with professional playing experience in the Cuban League:

- Mike González, catcher, age 22, had debuted in the Cuban League in the winter of 1909/10. González briefly played for the Boston Braves in 1912 and had signed to play with them again in 1913, but in April he was released to Long Branch with the Braves retaining an option. He played 17 seasons in the major leagues and 23 seasons in the Cuban League. In the Cuban League, he served as a manager until 1952–1953 and eventually became the owner of the Habana club. In the U.S., he became the first Latin American manager ever in the major leagues when he took the helm for the St. Louis Cardinals on an interim basis in 1938.
- Richard Henríquez, was first baseman and manager, age 33.
- Inocente Mendieta, second baseman, had played briefly in Cuba in the winter of 1911–1912.
- Dolf Luque, pitcher and third baseman, age 22, had debuted in the Cuban League in the winter of 1911–12. Luque later won 194 games over 20 major league seasons. In the Cuban League, he pitched for 22 seasons and won 106 games (second most in Cuban League history, behind Martín Dihigo) and served as a manager until 1955–1956.
- Jack Calvo, shortstop and second baseman, age 19, had debuted in the Cuban League the previous winter. He later played in two seasons for the Washington Senators and played in the Cuban League until 1926–1927.
- Juan Violá, outfielder, age 31, had played in the Cuban League since 1902–1903 and in the minor leagues since 1904.
- Luis Padrón, outfielder, third baseman, and pitcher, age 35, had played in the Cuban League since 1900 and the minor leagues since 1906. Padrón's contract was twice acquired by major league teams—by the Chicago White Sox in 1909 and by the Boston Braves in 1913—but he was not signed due to concerns that he would be considered a black man, and thus ineligible under the baseball color line.
- Ángel Aragón, outfielder and infielder, age 22, had played in the Cuban League since 1911–1912. He later played for three seasons with the New York Yankees.
- Ezequiel Ramos, outfielder and pitcher, age 28, had played in Cuba since 1904.
- José M. Gutiérrez, outfielder, would debut in the Cuban League in the winter of 1914–1915.
- Ángel Villazón, pitcher, age 21, had debuted in the Cuban League in the winter of 1912–1913.

The 1913 Long Branch Cubans went 65–29 and won the pennant by 18 1/2 games. Luque led the league in pitching with a 22–5 record, followed by Villazón who went 20–8. Aragón led the team in hitting with a .358 batting average, followed by Violá (.349), González (.333), and Padrón (.331).

On May 11, the Cubans beat the New York Giants 5 to 1. Padrón pitched and gave up only four hits. On August 6, the Boston Braves announced that they had purchased the contracts of Padrón, Aragón, Luque, and Villazón. The Braves also exercised their option on González. The players remained with Long Branch, however, and none of them played for Boston that year. Padrón and González were released in September, while Luque was retained and played briefly for the Braves in 1914.

=== 1914 ===
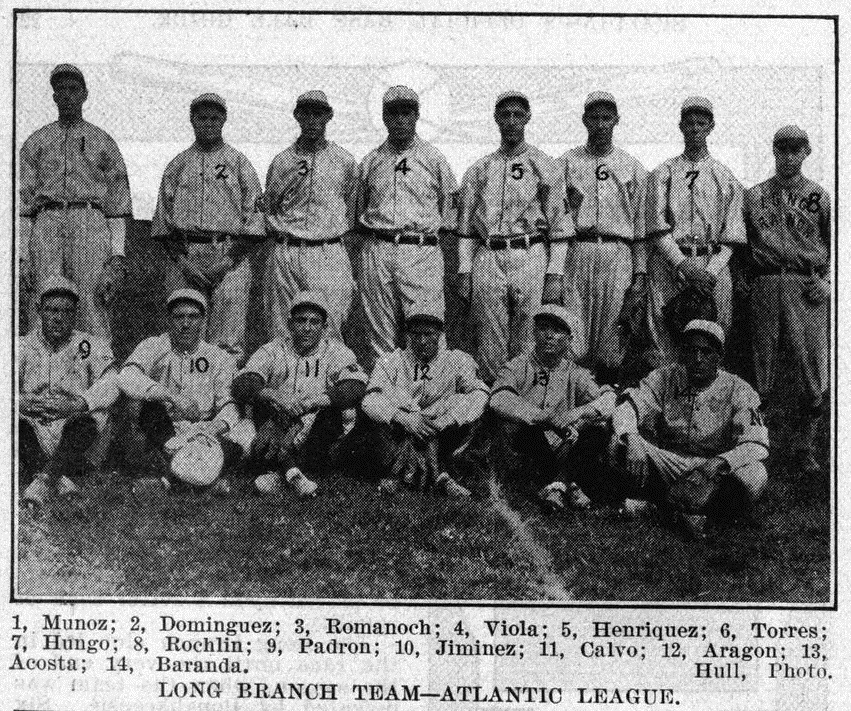
The 1914 Long Branch Cubans

Despite the team's success in 1913, the weekday attendance figure were considered to be disappointing. In March 1914, the Cubans received approval to move to Newark, with an agreement that the Cubans would not play while the Newark Indians of the International League were playing at home. The league, which had expanded to eight teams, changed its name to the "Atlantic League" at the same meeting.

Returning players in 1914 included Henríquez, Violá, Padrón, and Aragón. Henríquez recruited several new players from Cuba:

- Ricardo Torres, catcher, age 23, had debuted in the Cuban League the previous winter. He later played for the Washington Senators in parts of three seasons.
- Manuel Baranda, first baseman and pitcher, age 24, had also debuted in the Cuban League the previous winter.
- Fidelio Hungo, second baseman, age 22, was another player who had debuted the previous winter. He played in Cuba until 1921/22.
- Tomás Romañach, shortstop, age 24, had debuted in the Cuban League in 1910–1911, and was regarded as one of the best fielders of the era.
- José Acosta, pitcher, age 23, had played in the Cuban League since 1911–1912. He later pitched three seasons in the major leagues for the Washington Senators and the Chicago White Sox.
- Francisco ("Paco") Muñoz, pitcher, age 24, had debuted in Cuba in the winter of 1912–1913.

In early July, the Cubans moved from Newark back to Long Branch, where they finished the season. On July 19, Acosta pitched a 3–0 shutout against St. Louis Browns. Several newspapers reported that the game was a no-hitter, though one paper reported that he allowed two hits.

The Cubans led the 1914 pennant race until late in the season, but Poughkeepsie passed them and won the title. Long Branch finished with a 59–31 record, three games behind Poughkeepsie. Aragón led the league with a .443 batting average. Among the pitchers, Padrón went 14–5, Acosta went 13–5, Muñoz went 10–6, and Baranda went 6–4.

== Independent and Negro league baseball ==
=== 1915 ===
The Atlantic League folded after the 1914 season. Carlos Henríquez led the creation of a new, independent Atlantic League and served as its president. The Long Branch Cubans withdrew from the league in mid-May. The team continued to play exhibition games against major league teams, and also played leading Negro league baseball teams. (U.S. Negro baseball teams were not organized into formal leagues until 1920.) The team's 1915 roster was mostly familiar names: Calvo, Romañach, Violá, Padrón, Hungo, Baranda, Torres and Acosta. The team added outfielder Tomás Calvo and pitcher Gerardo Ballesteros.

On June 6, Acosta pitched another shutout against a major league team—the New York Yankees—beating them 5–0. An article in the Schenectady Gazette (July 22, 1916) said that the Cubans won seven of 14 games against major league opponents in 1915. Against Negro league baseball opponents, the Cubans were 12–12 in 1915. Romañach led the team in batting, hitting .394, while Padrón led the pitchers with a 3.00 earned run average (ERA).

=== 1916 ===
In 1916, Richard Henríquez removed himself from the lineup and became a full-time manager. Mike Herrera joined the team at second base, and Hungo moved over to first. Herrera, age 23, had first played in the Cuban League in 1911/12 and would continue playing there until 1929/30. In the United States, he would play in both the Negro National League in 1920–1921 and 1928, and for the Boston Red Sox in the American League in 1925–1926. Ramón González, age 21, took over at third base, as Padrón moved to the outfield to replace Tomás Calvo. Muñoz returned as pitcher to replace Acosta.

The team began the year playing in Jersey City, then rejoined the independent Atlantic League, representing Poughkeepsie. In late July, they moved temporarily to Harlem, then in August moved to Madison, which they represented in the Tri-County League, a short-season, independent league in New Jersey. They played poorly in the Tri-County League; the Lincoln Giants, representing Dover, easily won the championship. In recorded play against Negro league baseball teams, the 1916 Cubans went 14–7. Jack Calvo led the team in hitting with a .368 average, and Muñoz led the pitchers with a 3.03 ERA.
