= Ackermanville, Pennsylvania =

Unincorporated community in Pennsylvania, US

Ackermanville
- Census-designated place
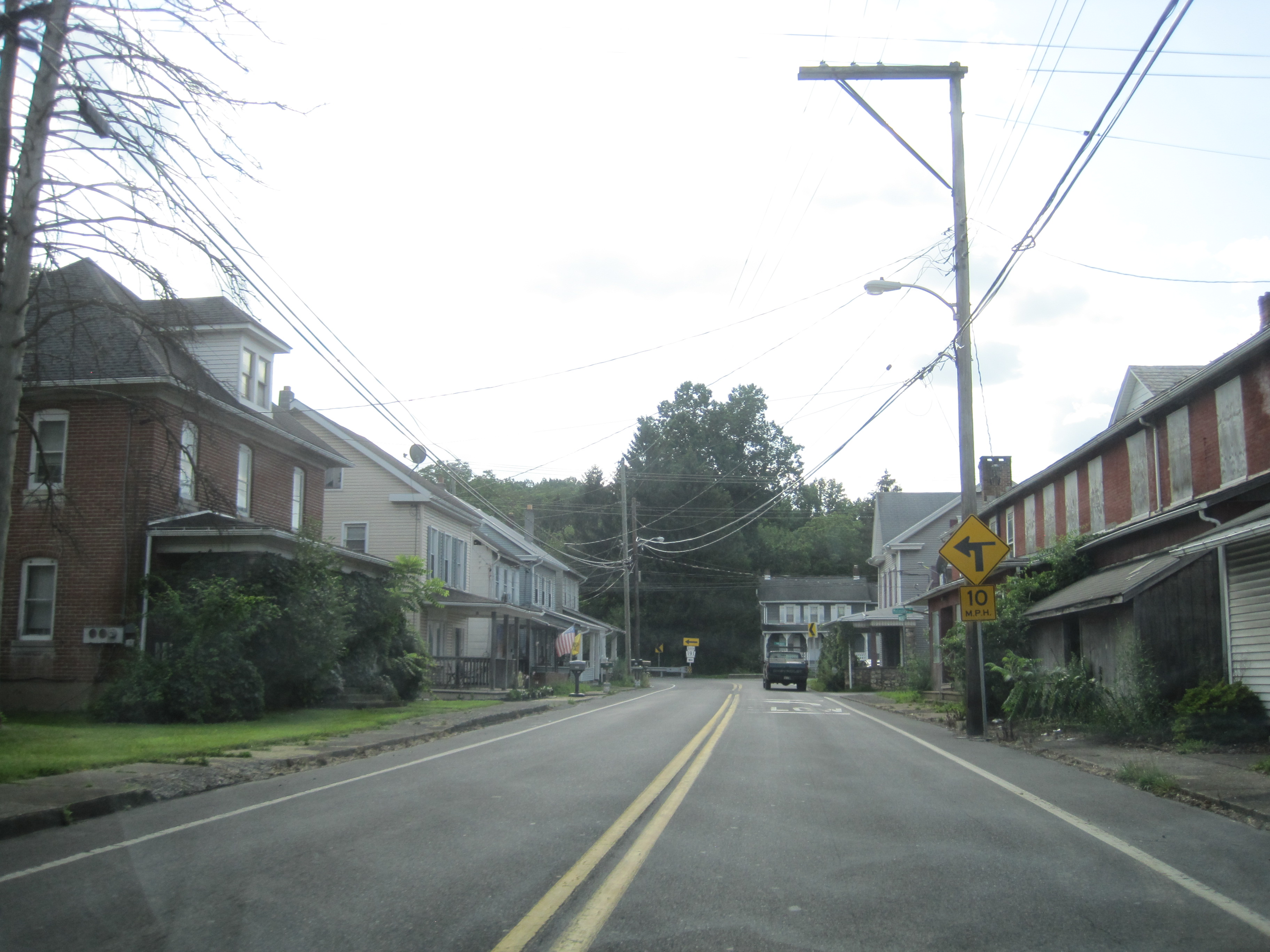
- Photo of Ackermanville along PA 191

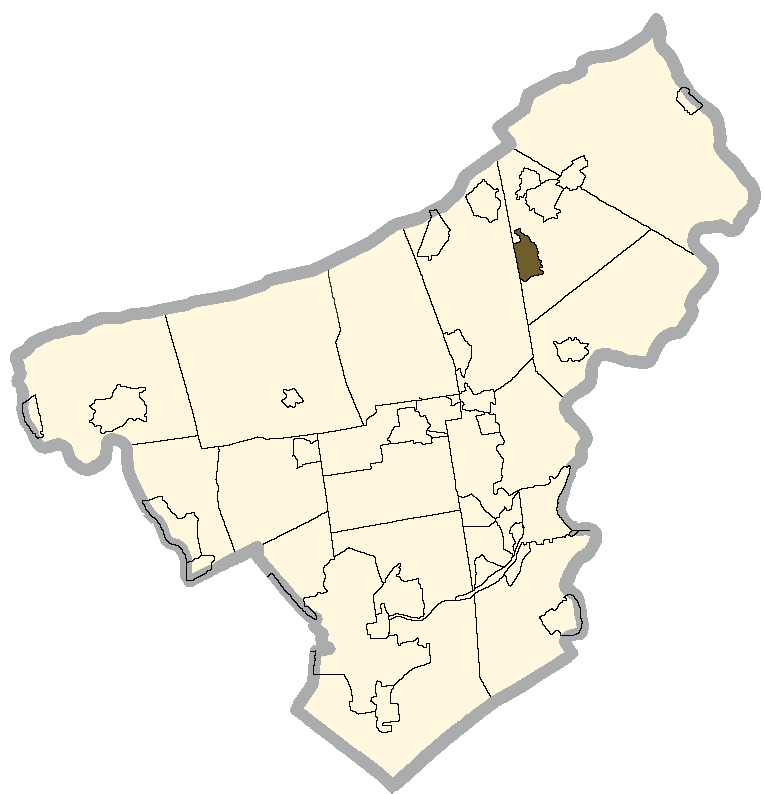
- Location of Ackermanville in Northampton County, Pennsylvania

- Location of Ackermanville in the state of Pennsylvania Ackermanville (the United States)
- Coordinates: 40°50′21″N 75°13′10″W
- Country: United States
- State: Pennsylvania
- County: Northampton
- Township: Washington

Area
  - Census-designated place: 1.37 sq mi (3.56 km^{2})
  - Land: 1.37 sq mi (3.55 km^{2})
  - Water: 0.0077 sq mi (0.02 km^{2})

Population (2020)
  - Census-designated place: 572
  - Estimate (2022): 280
  - Density: 417.6/sq mi (161.25/km^{2})
  - Metro: 865,310 (US: 68th)
- Time zone: UTC-5 (Eastern (EST))
  - Summer (DST): UTC-4 (EDT)
- ZIP Codes: 18013, 18072
- Area codes: 610 and 484
- FIPS code: 42-00244

Ackermanville is a census-designated place located on PA Route 191 in Washington Township, Northampton County, Pennsylvania, United States. As of the 2022 American Community Survey, the village's population was 280. Ackermanville is part of the Lehigh Valley metropolitan area, which had a population of 861,899 and was the 68th-most populous metropolitan area in the U.S. as of the 2020 census. It was named for the Ackerman family.

In 1788, Henry Miller built a house, grist mill, and saw mill on a 560-acre that included the present-day village. Four years later, Miller sold the properties to John Ackerman, who had relocated to the region with his family from Bucks County. Ackerman had six sons, who built their own houses, and over time, other families settled here. In the early 1800s, the village was known as Ackermans Mill and from 1850 to circa 1870 as Ackermans. It is not known when the present name came into use.

The village and surrounding area are drained by Martins Creek, which flows southward into the Delaware River. It is split between two ZIP Codes: Bangor, 18013, and Pen Argyl, 18072. Ackermanville previously had a post office with its own ZIP code, 18010, but the code was retired in 2016.

Historical population
| Census | Pop. | Note | %± |
|---|---|---|---|
| 2020 | 572 | | — |
U.S. Decennial Census

== Education ==
The community is served by the Bangor Area School District. Students in grades nine through 12 attend Bangor Area High School in Bangor.
