= Flicksville, Pennsylvania =

Unincorporated community in Pennsylvania, US

Flicksville
- Village
- Village of Flicksville
- Location of Flicksville in Pennsylvania Flicksville (the United States)
- Coordinates: 40°50′39″N 75°12′06″W
- Country: United States
- State: Pennsylvania
- County: Northampton
- Township: Washington
- Elevation: 417 ft (127 m)

Population
  - Metro: 865,310 (US: 68th)
- Time zone: UTC-5 (EST)
  - Summer (DST): UTC-4 (EDT)
- ZIP Code: 18013
- Area codes: 610 and 484
- GNIS feature ID: 1174902

Flicksville is a village located in Northampton County, Pennsylvania. It is located 75 miles (121 km) west of New York City and is part of the Lehigh Valley metropolitan area, which had a population of 861,899 and was the 68th-most populous metropolitan area in the U.S. as of the 2020 census.

It is part of Washington Township. Flicksville previously had a post office with a ZIP Code of 18050; however, this ZIP Code was retired in 2016 and the community is now served by the Bangor ZIP Code of 18013.

== Geography ==
Flicksville is located at 40°50′39″N 75°12′06″W (40.8442630,-75.2015672). It lies few km in south of the borough of Bangor and is crossed by the river Martins Creek.

== Education ==
The village is served by the Bangor Area School District. Students in grades nine through 12 attend Bangor Area High School in Bangor.
