= Washington Township, Northampton County, Pennsylvania =

Borough in Pennsylvania, US

Washington Township
- Township
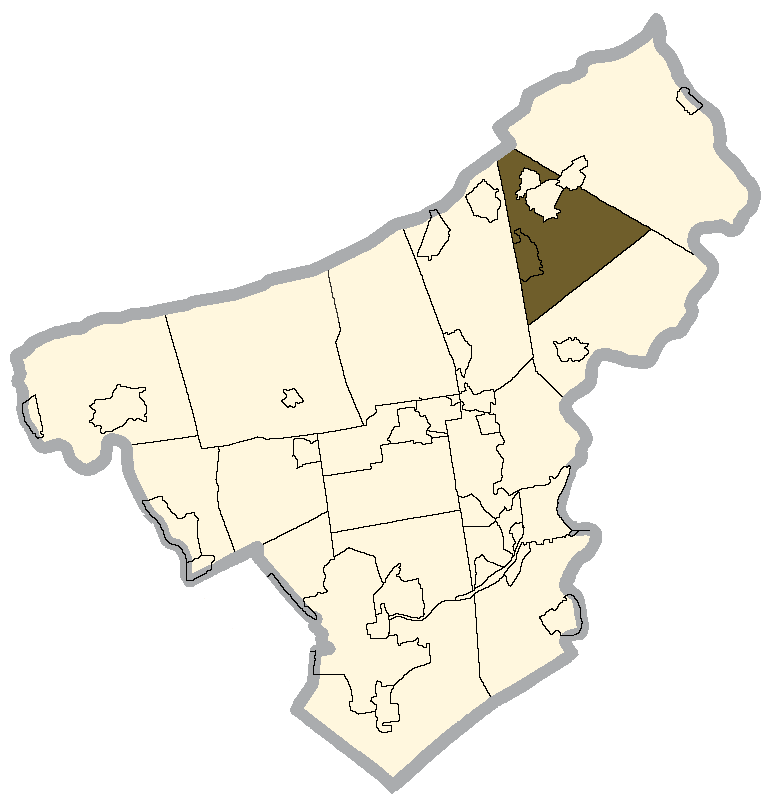
- Location of Washington Township in Northampton County, Pennsylvania

- Location of Washington Township in Pennsylvania
- Coordinates: 40°50′00″N 75°11′59″W
- Country: United States
- State: Pennsylvania
- County: Northampton
- Settled: 1730

Area
  - Township: 17.96 sq mi (46.52 km^{2})
  - Land: 17.79 sq mi (46.07 km^{2})
  - Water: 0.18 sq mi (0.46 km^{2})
- Elevation: 390 ft (120 m)

Population (2020)
  - Township: 5,148
  - Density: 289.4/sq mi (111.74/km^{2})
  - Metro: 865,310 (US: 68th)
- Time zone: UTC-5 (EST)
  - Summer (DST): UTC-4 (EDT)
- Area code: 610
- FIPS code: 42-095-81296
- Primary airport: Lehigh Valley International Airport
- Major hospital: Lehigh Valley Hospital–Cedar Crest
- School district: Bangor Area
- Website: washington-township.com

Washington Township is a township in Northampton County, Pennsylvania, United States. The population of Washington Township was 5,148 at the 2020 census. Washington Township is part of the Lehigh Valley metropolitan area, which had a population of 861,899 and was the 68th-most populous metropolitan area in the U.S. as of the 2020 census.

== Geography ==
According to the U.S. Census Bureau, the township has a total area of 18.0 square miles (47 km^{2}), of which all is land except for 0.18 square miles (0.47 km^{2}) of water surface, or 0.98% of the township's total area. It is in the Delaware River watershed and is drained by Martins Creek, except for a small area in the southeast drained by Oughoughton Creek. Its northwest corner is located on Blue Mountain. Its villages include Ackermanville, Factoryville, Flicksville, and Richmond.

=== Neighboring municipalities ===
- Plainfield Township (west)
- Lower Mount Bethel Township (southeast)
- Upper Mount Bethel Township (east and northeast)
- East Bangor (east)
- Hamilton Township, Monroe County (north)

Washington Township surrounds the borough cluster of Bangor and Roseto.

== Transportation ==
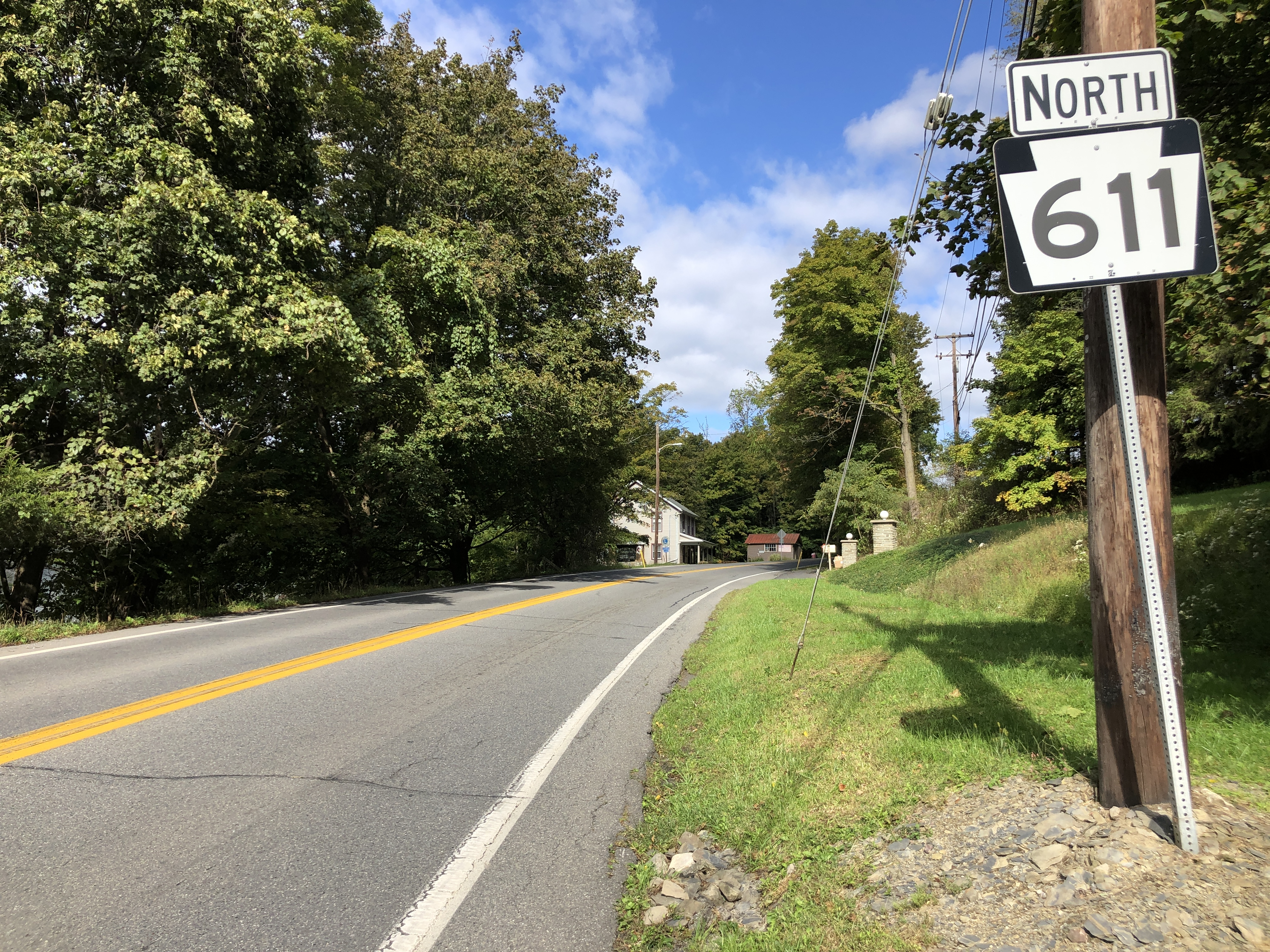
PA Route 611 North in Washington Township

As of 2020, there were 61.78 miles (99.43 km) of public roads in Washington Township, of which 21.97 miles (35.36 km) were maintained by the Pennsylvania Department of Transportation (PennDOT) and 39.81 miles (64.07 km) were maintained by the township.

Numbered highways which serve Washington Township include Pennsylvania Route 191, Pennsylvania Route 512 and Pennsylvania Route 611. PA 611 follows a north–south alignment across the eastern corner of the township. PA 512 follows an east–west alignment across the northwestern portion of the township. PA 191 follows a north–south alignment across the northern and western portions of the township.

== Demographics ==
Historical population
Census	Pop.	Note	%±
2000	4,152		—
2010	5,122		23.4%
2020	5,148		0.5%
U.S. Decennial Census

As of the census of 2000, there were 4,152 people, 1,601 households, and 1,179 families residing in the township. The population density was 229.9 inhabitants per square mile (88.8/km^{2}). There were 1,670 housing units at an average density of 92.5 per square mile (35.7/km^{2}). The racial makeup of the township was 99.16% White, 0.05% African American, 0.07% Native American, 0.10% Asian, 0.31% from other races, and 0.31% from two or more races. Hispanic or Latino of any race were 0.67% of the population.

There were 1,601 households, out of which 30.7% had children under the age of 18 living with them, 62.8% were married couples living together, 6.1% had a female householder with no husband present, and 26.3% were non-families. 22.2% of all households were made up of individuals, and 13.6% had someone living alone who was 65 years of age or older. The average household size was 2.52 and the average family size was 2.96.

In the township, the population was spread out, with 22.4% under the age of 18, 5.5% from 18 to 24, 26.6% from 25 to 44, 26.3% from 45 to 64, and 19.2% who were 65 years of age or older. The median age was 42 years. For every 100 females, there were 93.0 males. For every 100 females age 18 and over, there were 86.8 males. The median income for a household in the township was $48,728, and the median income for a family was $54,601. Males had a median income of $37,213 versus $27,553 for females. The per capita income for the township was $22,219. About 3.3% of families and 5.8% of the population were below the poverty line, including 7.1% of those under age 18 and 7.5% of those age 65 or over.

== Education ==
The township is served by the Bangor Area School District. Students in grades nine through 12 attend Bangor Area High School in Bangor.
