= Upper Mount Bethel Township, Pennsylvania =

Borough in Pennsylvania, US

Upper Mount Bethel Township
- Township
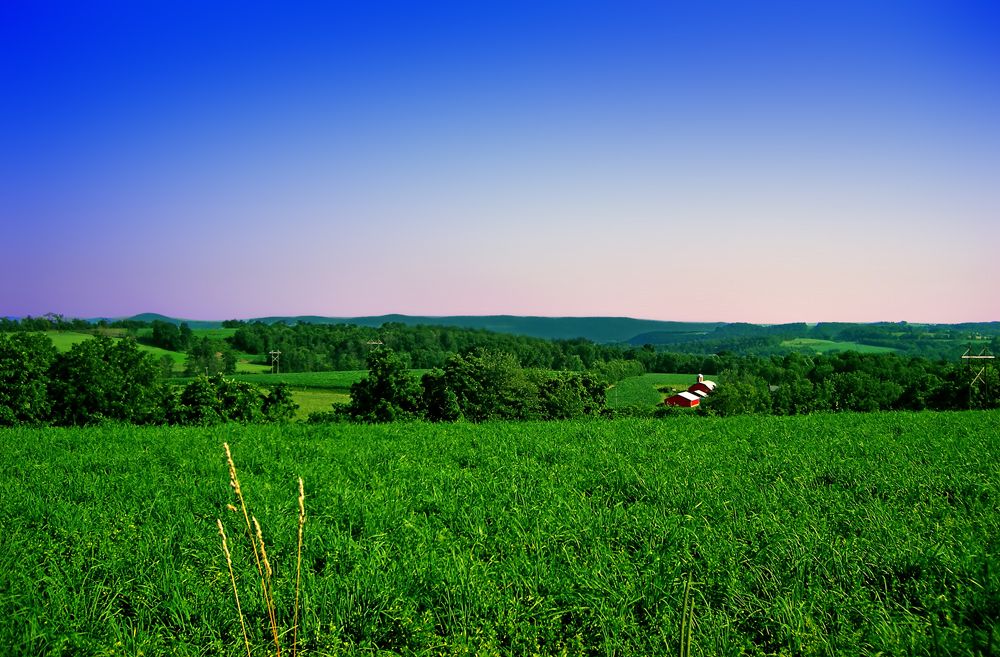
- Rolling hills in Upper Mount Bethel Township in July 2006

- Seal

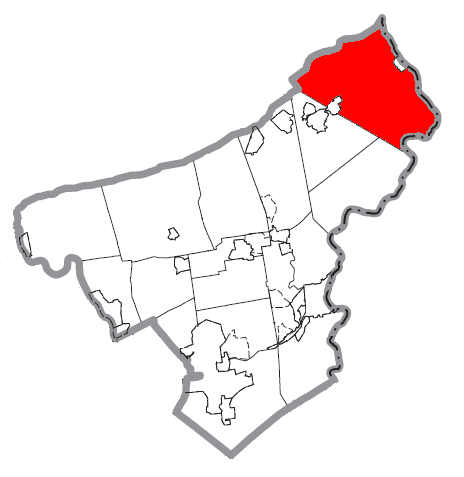
- Upper Mount Bethel Township in Northampton County, Pennsylvania
- Coordinates: 40°52′00″N 75°07′59″W
- Country: United States
- State: Pennsylvania
- County: Northampton

Area
  - Township: 43.99 sq mi (113.93 km^{2})
  - Land: 42.42 sq mi (109.88 km^{2})
  - Water: 1.56 sq mi (4.05 km^{2})
- Elevation: 699 ft (213 m)

Population (2020)
  - Township: 6,439
  - Density: 152/sq mi (58.6/km^{2})
  - Metro: 865,310 (US: 68th)
- Time zone: UTC-5 (EST)
  - Summer (DST): UTC-4 (EDT)
- Area codes: 570 and 610
- FIPS code: 42-095-79184
- Primary airport: Lehigh Valley International Airport
- Major hospital: Lehigh Valley Hospital–Cedar Crest
- School district: Bangor Area
- Website: Township website

Upper Mount Bethel Township is a township in Northampton County, Pennsylvania, United States. The population of Upper Mount Bethel Township was 6,439 at the 2020 census. The township is part of the Lehigh Valley metropolitan area, which had a population of 861,899 and was the 68th-most populous metropolitan area in the U.S. as of the 2020 census.

== History ==
Old Mount Bethel was one of the oldest settled areas in Northampton County. Included in its jurisdiction was the Old Hunter Settlement, founded by the Ulster Scots around 1730. The same year, Old Mount Bethel was erected a town.

After the Walking Purchase of 1737 between the William Penn family and the Lenape Delaware Indian tribes was completed, Old Mount Bethel was established in Bucks County.

In 1752, Bucks County was divided and Northampton County was established, placing Old Mount Bethel within the boundaries of Northampton County.

== Geography ==
According to the U.S. Census Bureau, the township has a total area of 44.0 square miles (114 km^{2}), of which 42.4 square miles (110 km^{2}) is land and 1.6 square miles (4.1 km^{2}) (3.56%) is water. It is drained by the Delaware River, which forms its eastern boundary separating it from New Jersey.

Its natural northwestern boundary is Blue Mountain. Its villages include Centerville, Five Points, Hartzells Ferry, Johnsonville, Mount Bethel, North Bangor, and Slateford.

=== Neighboring municipalities ===
- Washington Township (southwest)
- East Bangor (southwest)
- Lower Mount Bethel Township (south)
- Belvidere, New Jersey (southeast)
- White Township, New Jersey (east)
- Knowlton Township, New Jersey (east)
- Portland (east)
- Delaware Water Gap, Monroe County (north)
- Smithfield Township, Monroe County (north)
- Stroud Township, Monroe County (north)
- Hamilton Township, Monroe County (northwest)

== Demographics ==
Historical population
| Census | Pop. | Note | %± |
|---|---|---|---|
| 2000 | 6,063 | | — |
| 2010 | 6,706 | | 10.6% |
| 2020 | 6,439 | | −4.0% |
U.S. Decennial Census

As of the 2000 census, there were 6,063 people, 2,363 households, and 1,732 families residing in the township. The population density was 139.7 inhabitants per square mile (53.9/km^{2}). There were 2,574 housing units at an average density of 59.3 per square mile (22.9/km^{2}). The racial makeup of the township was 97.89% White, 0.69% African American, 0.13% Native American, 0.49% Asian, 0.21% from other races, and 0.58% from two or more races. Hispanic or Latino of any race were 1.39% of the population.

There were 2,363 households, out of which 28.8% had children under the age of 18 living with them, 63.4% were married couples living together, 6.1% had a female householder with no husband present, and 26.7% were non-families. 21.7% of all households were made up of individuals, and 8.9% had someone living alone who was 65 years of age or older. The average household size was 2.56 and the average family size was 2.96.

In the township, the population was spread out, with 22.8% under the age of 18, 6.2% from 18 to 24, 28.3% from 25 to 44, 26.8% from 45 to 64, and 15.9% who were 65 years of age or older. The median age was 41 years. For every 100 females, there were 100.8 males. For every 100 females age 18 and over, there were 100.6 males.

The median income for a household in the township was $45,617, and the median income for a family was $54,692. Males had a median income of $38,914 versus $23,906 for females. The per capita income for the township was $21,116. About 4.6% of families and 6.3% of the population were below the poverty line, including 3.3% of those under age 18 and 15.7% of those age 65 or over.

== Transportation ==
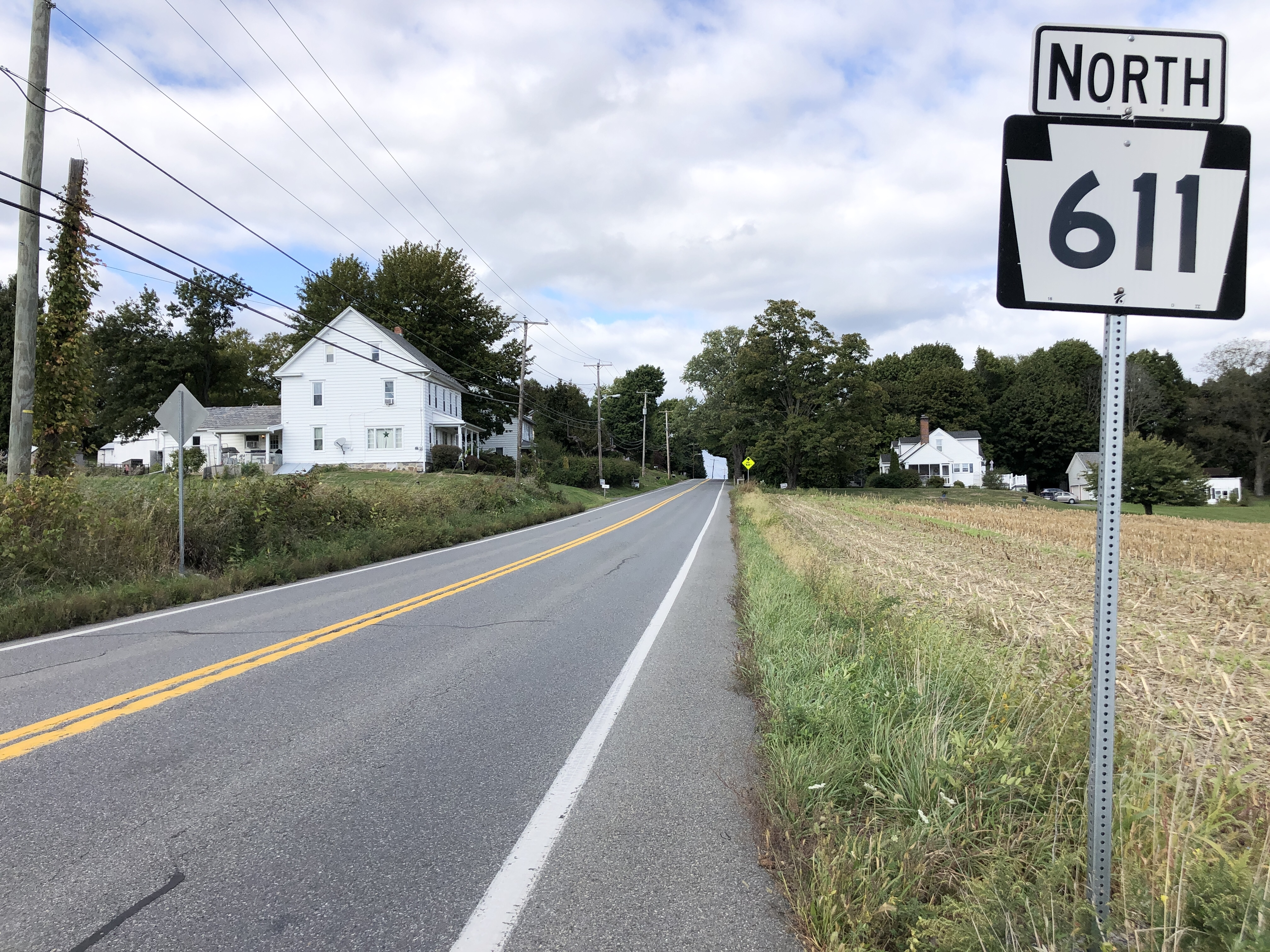
Route 611 north in Upper Mount Bethel Township

As of 2018, there were 121.22 miles (195.08 km) of public roads in Upper Mount Bethel Township, of which 20.57 miles (33.10 km) were maintained by the Pennsylvania Department of Transportation (PennDOT) and 100.65 miles (161.98 km) were maintained by the township.

Pennsylvania Route 191, Pennsylvania Route 512 and Pennsylvania Route 611 are the numbered highways serving Upper Mount Bethel Township. PA 191 follows a north–south alignment across the western portion of the township. PA 512 follows an east–west alignment through the middle of the township. PA 611 follows a north–south alignment across the eastern portion of the township.

== Education ==
The township is served by Bangor Area School District. Students in grades nine through 12 attend Bangor Area High School in Bangor.

== Notable people ==
- Johann Adam Eyer, fraktur artist
