= Lower Mount Bethel Township, Pennsylvania =

Township in Pennsylvania, US

Lower Mount Bethel Township
- Township
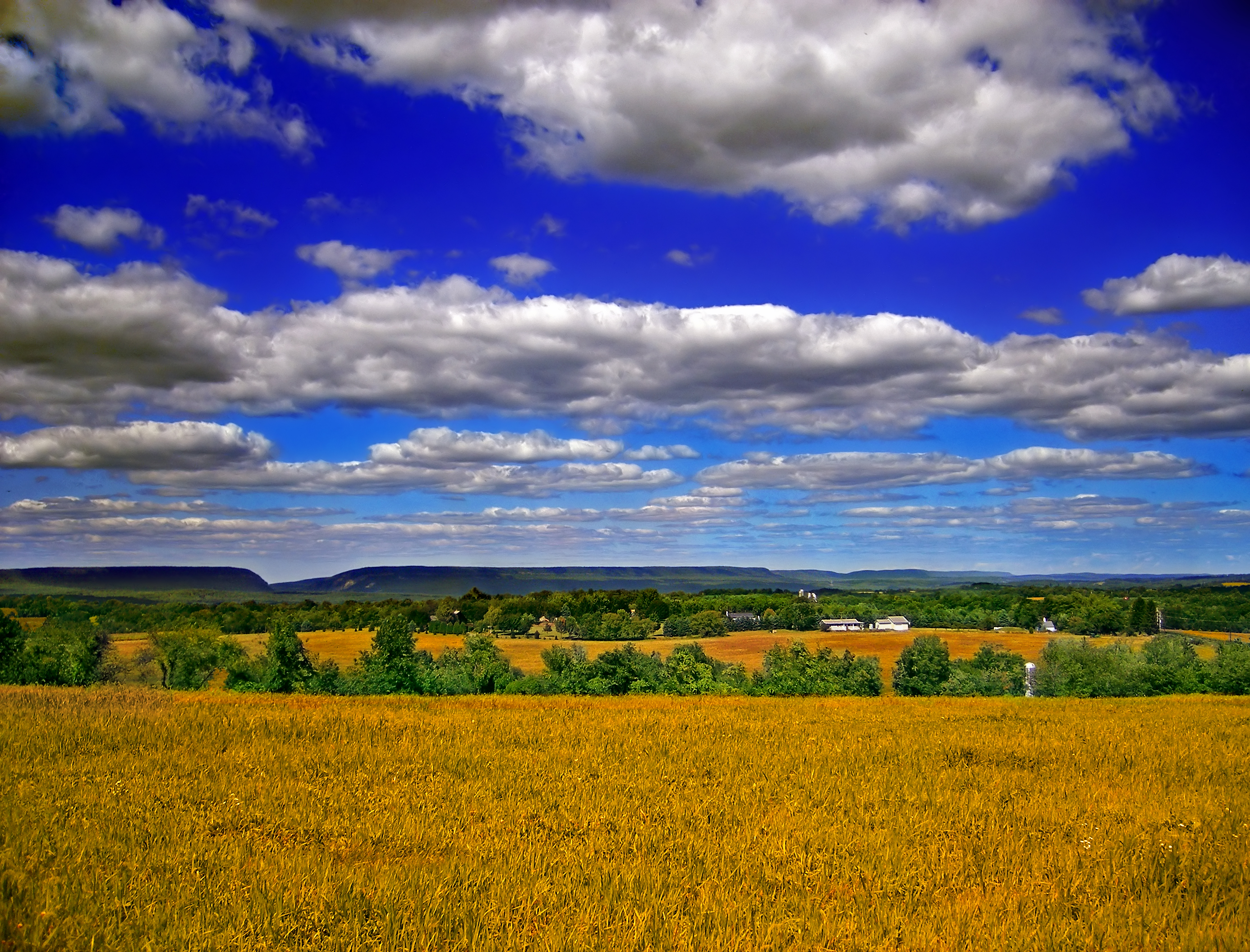
- Lower Mount Bethel Township in September 2007

- Seal
- Interactive map of Lower Mount Bethel Township
- Coordinates: 40°48′00″N 75°09′59″W
- Country: United States
- State: Pennsylvania
- County: Northampton

Area
  - Township: 24.57 sq mi (63.64 km^{2})
  - Land: 23.81 sq mi (61.67 km^{2})
  - Water: 0.76 sq mi (1.97 km^{2})
- Elevation: 633 ft (193 m)

Population (2020)
  - Township: 2,921
  - Density: 122.7/sq mi (47.36/km^{2})
  - Metro: 865,310 (US: 68th)
- Time zone: UTC-5 (EST)
  - Summer (DST): UTC-4 (EDT)
- Area code: 610
- FIPS code: 42-095-45016
- Primary airport: Lehigh Valley International Airport
- Major hospital: Lehigh Valley Hospital–Cedar Crest
- School district: Bangor Area or Easton Area
- Website: www.lowermtbethel.org

Lower Mount Bethel Township is a township in Northampton County, Pennsylvania, United States. The population of Lower Mount Bethel Township was 2,921 at the 2020 census. Lower Mount Bethel Township is part of the Lehigh Valley metropolitan area, which had a population of 861,899 and was the 68th-most populous metropolitan area in the U.S. as of the 2020 census.

== Geography ==
According to the U.S. Census Bureau, the township has a total area of 24.6 square miles (63.6 km^{2}), of which 23.8 square miles (61.7 km^{2}) is land and 0.8 square miles (2.0 km^{2}) (3.10%) is water. It is drained by the Delaware River, which forms its eastern and southern boundary and separates it from New Jersey. Its villages include Gruvertown, Martins Creek, Mount Pleasant, and Riverton.

=== Neighboring municipalities ===
- Upper Mount Bethel Township (northeast)
- Washington Township (northwest)
- Plainfield Township (west)
- Forks Township (southwest)
- Harmony Township, New Jersey (south)
- White Township, New Jersey (southeast)
- Belvidere, New Jersey (east)

== Demographics ==
Historical population
Census	Pop.	Note	%±
2000	3,228		—
2010	3,101		−3.9%
2020	2,921		−5.8%
U.S. Decennial Census

At the 2000 census, there were 3,228 people, 1,223 households and 900 families residing in the township. The population density was 133.5 inhabitants per square mile (51.5/km^{2}). There were 1,347 housing units at an average density of 55.7 per square mile (21.5/km^{2}). The racial makeup of the township was 98.30% White, 0.68% African American, 0.06% Native American, 0.25% Asian, 0.03% Pacific Islander, 0.25% from other races, and 0.43% from two or more races. Hispanic or Latino of any race were 0.99% of the population.

There were 1,223 households, of which 31.7% had children under the age of 18 living with them, 63.5% were married couples living together, 6.6% had a female householder with no husband present, and 26.4% were non-families. 22.2% of all households were made up of individuals, and 8.4% had someone living alone who was 65 years of age or older. The average household size was 2.63 and the average family size was 3.09.

24.3% of the population were under the age of 18, 7.4% from 18 to 24, 27.9% from 25 to 44, 27.0% from 45 to 64, and 13.4% who were 65 years of age or older. The median age was 40 years. For every 100 females, there were 105.7 males. For every 100 females age 18 and over, there were 103.8 males. The median household income was $51,568 and the median family income was $56,553. Males had a median income of $41,164 compared with $26,563 for females. The per capita income for the township was $21,088. About 4.8% of families and 5.8% of the population were below the poverty line, including 6.9% of those under age 18 and 5.8% of those age 65 or over.

== Education ==
The township is served by the Bangor Area and Easton Area school districts. Students in grades nine through 12 attend either Easton Area High School in Easton or Bangor Area High School in Bangor.

== Transportation ==
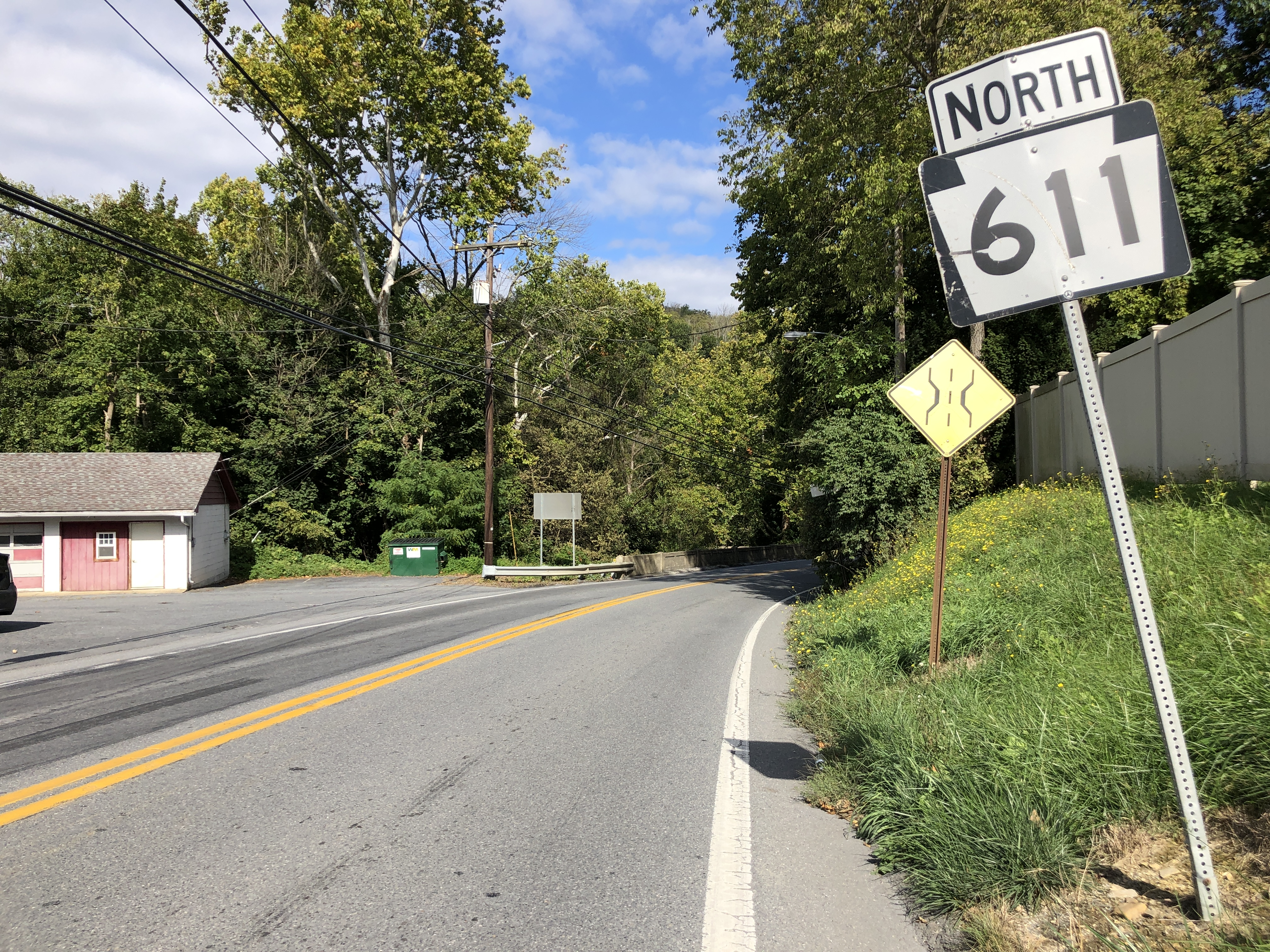
PA Route 611 North in Lower Mount Bethel Township

As of 2007, there were 61.10 miles (98.33 km) of public roads in Lower Mount Bethel Township, of which 26.11 miles (42.02 km) were maintained by the Pennsylvania Department of Transportation (PennDOT) and 34.99 miles (56.31 km) were maintained by the township.

Pennsylvania Route 611 traverses Lower Mount Bethel Township, following a southwest-northeast alignment through the center of the township.
