= Bridge in Bangor Borough =

Historic place in Pennsylvania, United States

- U.S. National Register of Historic Places
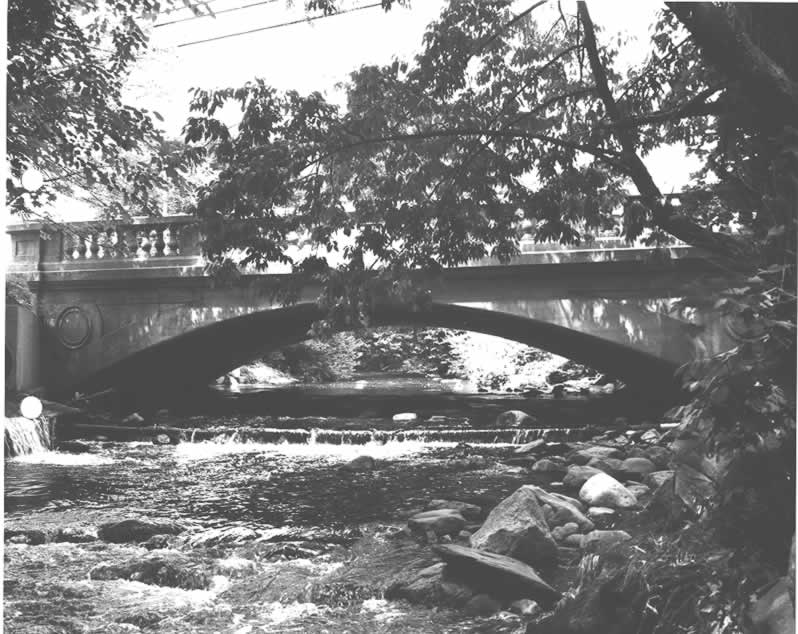
- Bridge in Bangor Borough, 1982

- Location within Pennsylvania Location within the United States
- Location: Pennsylvania St. over Martins Creek, Bangor, Pennsylvania
- Coordinates: 40°52′10″N 75°12′28″W
- Area: less than one acre (0.4 ha)
- Built: 1915
- Built by: Jacob Stem
- Architect: Herbert C. Dilliard
- MPS: Highway Bridges Owned by the Commonwealth of Pennsylvania, Department of Transportation TR
- NRHP reference No.: 88000876
- Added to NRHP: June 22, 1988

Bridge in Bangor Borough is a historic concrete arch bridge spanning Martins Creek at Bangor, Northampton County, Pennsylvania. It was built in 1915, and is a small, single arched bridge spanning 45 ft (14 m). It features molded ornamental designs on the spandrel walls and abutments.

It was added to the National Register of Historic Places in 1988.
