= Unreal Estate =

Unreal Estate may refer to:

- Unreal Estate (TV series), an Australian television series
- Unreal Estate (album), a 2005 album by Entombed
- "Unreal Estate", an episode from the 10th season of SpongeBob SquarePants
- Unreal Estate: Money, Ambition, and the Lust for Land in Los Angeles, a 2011 book by Michael Gross

== See also ==
- Real Estate (disambiguation)
