= Sound the Alarm (band) =

- Origin: Bangor, Pennsylvania, U.S.
- Genres: Pop rock, alternative rock, power pop
- Years active: 1999–2009 (indefinite hiatus)
- Label: Geffen Records
- Members: Cody Jancovic (vocals); Joe Brule (guitar, vocals); Brian Chiusano (guitar); Colin Ellis (bass); Rick Stephans (drums)
- Website: myspace.com/soundthealarmmusic

Sound the Alarm is an American pop rock band from Bangor, Pennsylvania. The band consists of singer Cody Jancovic, guitarists Joe Brule and Brian Chiusano, bassist Colin Ellis, and drummer Rick Stephans. Their 2007 album, Stay Inside, was released by Geffen Records.

== History ==
Sound The Alarm was formed in 1999 by Cody Jancovic, Brian Chiusano, Colin Ellis, Rick Stephans in their hometown of Bangor in Upper Mount Bethel Township, Pennsylvania. At that time, the band members were only 12 years old. The four played covers of favorite bands under the name Sleepwell.

After Joe Brule joined the band, Sleepwell began writing original material and won local acclaim. Working with Rob Freeman, then of Hidden in Plain View, Sleepwell recorded a demo and word spread quickly about the band.

In 2004, they were courted by producer Howard Benson while still students at Bangor Area High School. The band changed its name to Sound The Alarm because of a threatened lawsuit by a mattress company alleging that the name "Sleepwell" infringed on their copyright. The group graduated early from high school in 2005, newly christened as Sound The Alarm, released an EP on Rock Ridge Music later that year.

They then signed with Geffen Records and moved to Los Angeles to record with Howard Benson, releasing their debut full-length, Stay Inside, in July 2007 to mixed reviews.

The group toured with Finch, The Starting Line, Oh, Sleeper, Tokyo Rose, Bedlight For Blue Eyes, and others. The song "Suffocating" was covered by Orianthi on her debut album Believe.

== Discography ==
- Coin Operated Entertainment EP (Self-released, 2003)

(released while still known as "Sleepwell")
Track Listing:
1. Dearly Departed
2. Trademarks
3. Symphony In Red
4. Firing Line (All Targets Down)
5. Center City

- Sound the Alarm (2005, Rock Ridge Records)

Track Listing:
1. Fools and Thieves
2. Suffocate To Stay Alive
3. Cutting Deep
4. Prove Them Wrong
5. Waiting For Winter
6. Never Let You Down

- Stay Inside (Release Date July 17, 2007, Geffen Records)

Track Listing:
1. Closer
2. Picture Perfect
3. Suffocating
4. Stay Inside
5. Until We Collide
6. Fact or Fiction
7. Telling Lies
8. If I Told You
9. Count On Me
10. Something New
11. Blame It All On Me
12. Fight For...

The song "Dearly Departed" from Coin Operated Entertainment was re-recorded as "Count On Me" for Stay Inside. Similarly, the demo version of "Suffocating" from Stay Inside is called "Suffocate To Stay Alive" on Sound The Alarm.
