= Portland, Pennsylvania =

Borough in Pennsylvania, US

Borough of Portland
- Borough
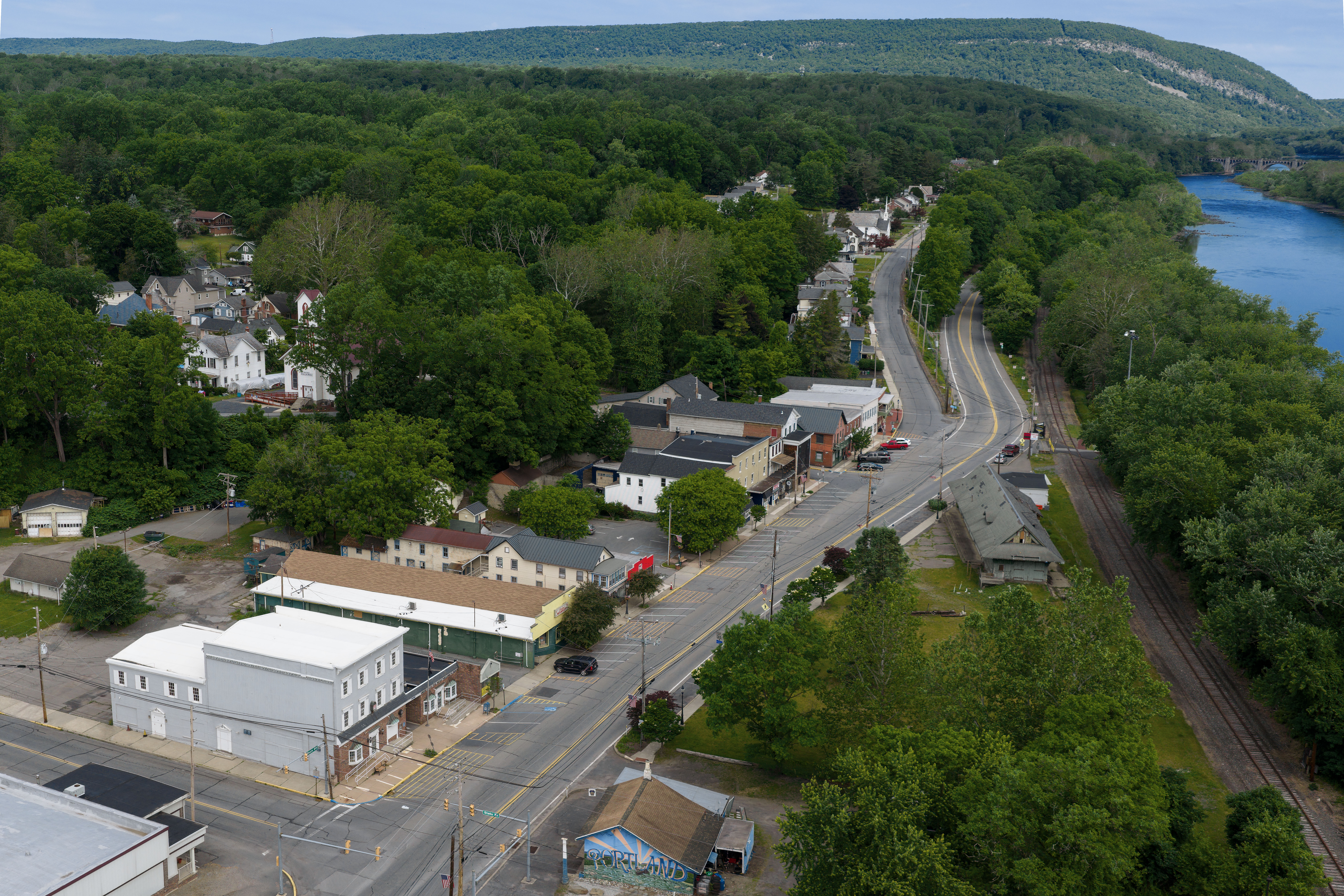
- Downtown, June 2026

- Seal

- Location of Portland in Northampton County, Pennsylvania (left) and of Northampton County in Pennsylvania (right)

- Location of Portland in Pennsylvania Portland (the United States)
- Coordinates: 40°55′14″N 75°5′52″W
- Country: United States
- State: Pennsylvania
- County: Northampton

Government
  - Mayor: Heather Fischer

Area
  - Borough: 0.56 sq mi (1.44 km^{2})
  - Land: 0.48 sq mi (1.25 km^{2})
  - Water: 0.073 sq mi (0.19 km^{2})
- Elevation: 335 ft (102 m)

Population (2020)
  - Borough: 494
  - Density: 1,023.7/sq mi (395.25/km^{2})
  - Metro: 865,310 (US: 68th)
- Time zone: UTC-5 (EST)
  - Summer (DST): UTC-4 (EDT)
- ZIP Code: 18351
- Area code: 570
- FIPS code: 42-62264
- Primary airport: Lehigh Valley International Airport
- Major hospital: Lehigh Valley Hospital-Pocono
- School district: Bangor Area
- Website: portlandboroughpa.com

Portland is a borough in Northampton County, Pennsylvania. The population of Portland was 494 at the 2020 census. Portland is part of the Lehigh Valley metropolitan area, which had a population of 861,899 and was thus the 68th most populous metropolitan area in the U.S. as of the 2020 census.

== Geography ==
Portland is located at 40°55′14″N 75°5′52″W (40.920622, -75.097738). According to the U.S. Census Bureau, the borough has a total area of 0.6 square miles (1.6 km^{2}), of which 0.5 square miles (1.3 km^{2}) is land and 0.1 square miles (0.26 km^{2}) (8.93%) is water. This is due to the location of the borough being along the Delaware River.

== Transportation ==
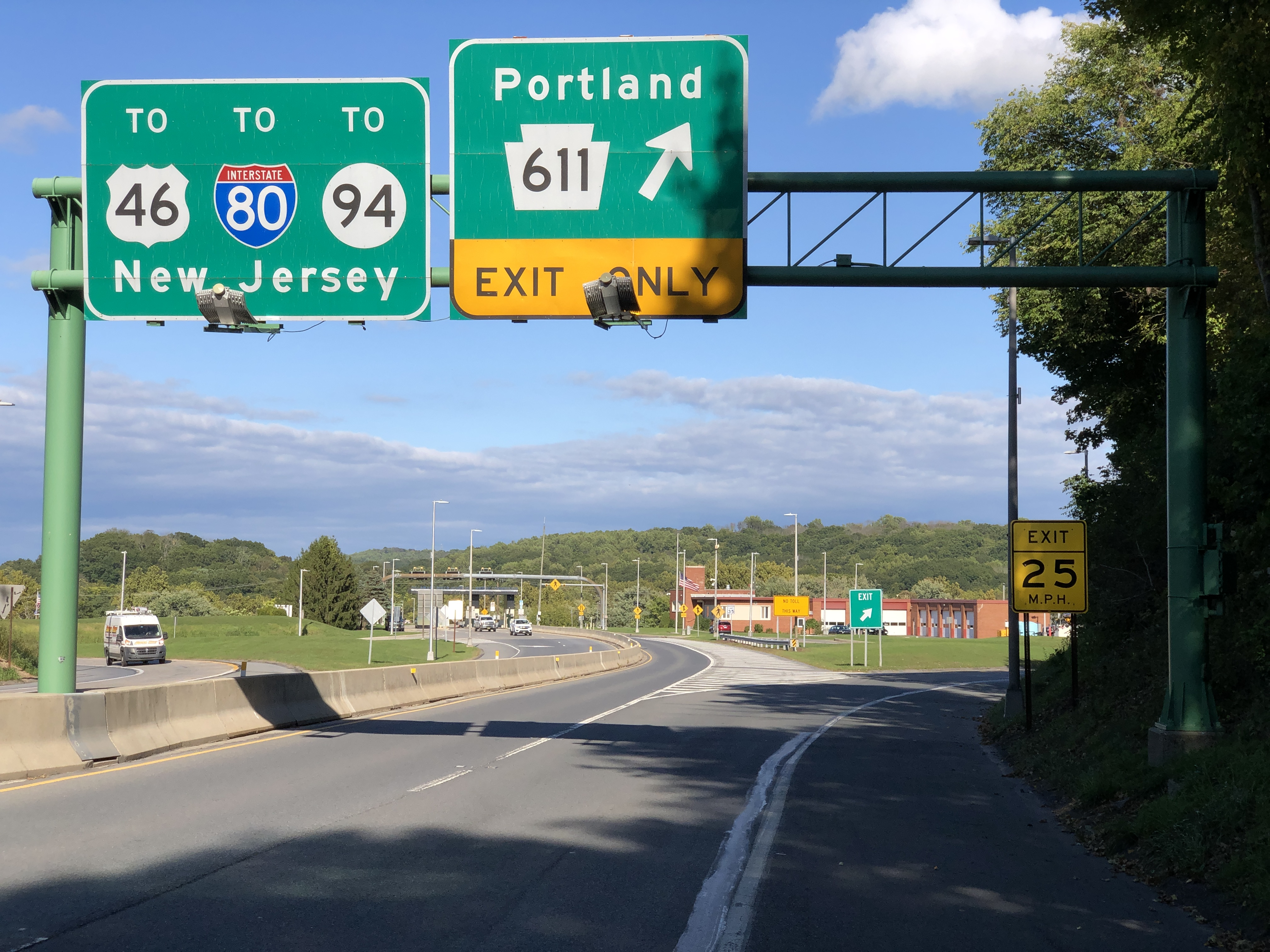
PA Route 611 northbound at the exit for the Portland–Columbia Toll Bridge in Portland

As of 2007, there were 4.27 miles (6.87 km) of public roads in Portland, of which 1.57 miles (2.53 km) were maintained by the Pennsylvania Department of Transportation (PennDOT) and 2.70 miles (4.35 km) were maintained by the borough.

Pennsylvania Route 611 is the only numbered highway serving Portland. It follows Delaware Drive along a north–south alignment through the heart of the borough. The Portland–Columbia Toll Bridge crosses the Delaware River in Portland, connecting the borough to U.S. Route 46, New Jersey Route 94 and Interstate 80 in New Jersey.

Portland also has a pedestrian bridge that crosses the Delaware River, connecting Portland to Columbia in New Jersey. This bridge is the last of 16 similar footbridges that formerly crossed the Delaware River and measures a total of 770 feet (230 m) long. Prior to the flood of 1955, it was a covered bridge.

== History ==
=== 19th century ===
Portland's first major business was logging. It also had several taverns and hotels. Records show that the Hibblertown Hotel, which is the present-day Ackerson house on State Street, the Dill's Tavern, which was later torn down, and the What Cheer Inn, which is present-day Duckloe Showroom at the corner of Delaware Avenue and Main Street, all prospered because of loggers.

The railroad was a vital force in the development of Portland. It changed the mode of transporting goods, and attracted many new residents. As a result of increased population, the business community expanded to serve the needs of the village. By the time of the incorporation there were three general stores, a hardware store, a drug store, four confectionery shops, two millinery shops, and jewelry store.

The Delaware River provided easy transport. At first only the Indians skimmed their canoes over its surface, but by the mid-18th century, rafts were in use during spring floods. As late as 1870, the river near Portland would be full of rafts as far as the eye could see. Rafting started to wane in the 1880s because railroads had reached the lumbering country. The Portland Covered Bridge had its beginnings as early as February 5, 1816. Records indicate that Francis Myerhoff, owner of the Columbia Glass Works, received a charter from the State of New Jersey to build a bridge across the river to help in the delivery of the sand he needed for his factory in New Jersey. In January 1869, the bridge was finally completed by the Charles, Kellogg and Maurice Company of Athens, Pennsylvania, which was later renamed the Union Bridge Company. According to an Easton paper of January 19, 1869, Mrs. Sophia Sandt rode from Pennsylvania to New Jersey and back again in her sleigh "amidst the applause of the people." The bridge, of the Burr Truss type, was 775 feet long, 18 feet wide, and cost about $40,000 to construct.

Portland had a newspaper, The Portland Enterprise. This weekly paper, started in 1874 by L.G. Raymond, gave the people on both sides of the river all the news. Coe Finch took over the paper in the 1880s and continued until John Wildrick became editor in 1900. The financial center of Portland and its vicinity was the Portland National Bank. It was organized on February 7, 1903, and received its charter as a federal bank on March 11, 1903. It served the Portland area continuously except for a period during 1932 when it closed its doors under the pressure of the Great Depression.

=== 20th and 21st centuries ===
The Great Flood of August 19, 1955, was too much for the span. Early in the afternoon of that Friday, the center of the bridge gave way to the relentless pounding of the highest water ever recorded on the Delaware River, and all but the section closest to the New Jersey side floated down the river. Thus came to an end what was at the time the longest covered wooden bridge in the United States, and the last one spanning the Delaware River.

County Bridge No. 36 in Portland was added to the National Register of Historic Places in 1988.

== Demographics ==
Historical population
Census	Pop.	Note	%±
1880	608		—
1890	676		11.2%
1900	490		−27.5%
1910	649		32.4%
1920	545		−16.0%
1930	551		1.1%
1940	427		−22.5%
1950	551		29.0%
1960	589		6.9%
1970	612		3.9%
1980	540		−11.8%
1990	516		−4.4%
2000	579		12.2%
2010	519		−10.4%
2020	494		−4.8%

As of the 2000 census, there were 579 people, 236 households, and 152 families residing in the borough. The population density was 1,117.7 inhabitants per square mile (431.5/km^{2}). There were 247 housing units at an average density of 476.8 per square mile (184.1/km^{2}). The racial makeup of the borough was 98.27% White, 0.86% Asian, 0.17% from other races, and 0.69% from two or more races. Hispanic or Latino of any race were 4.15% of the population.

There were 236 households, out of which 28.8% had children under the age of 18 living with them, 48.7% were married couples living together, 9.3% had a female householder with no husband present, and 35.2% were non-families. 27.5% of all households were made up of individuals, and 10.6% had someone living alone who was 65 years of age or older. The average household size was 2.45 and the average family size was 2.99.

In the borough, the population was spread out, with 22.8% under the age of 18, 5.2% from 18 to 24, 32.1% from 25 to 44, 24.7% from 45 to 64, and 15.2% who were 65 years of age or older. The median age was 39 years. For every 100 females there were 98.3 males. For every 100 females age 18 and over, there were 99.6 males. The median income for a household in the borough was $36,827, and the median income for a family was $46,250. Males had a median income of $35,417 versus $21,875 for females. The per capita income for the borough was $17,275. About 4.1% of families and 6.0% of the population were below the poverty line, including 0.7% of those under age 18 and 4.2% of those age 65 or over.

== Education ==
The borough is served by the Bangor Area School District. Students in grades nine through 12 attend Bangor Area High School in Bangor.

== Gallery ==
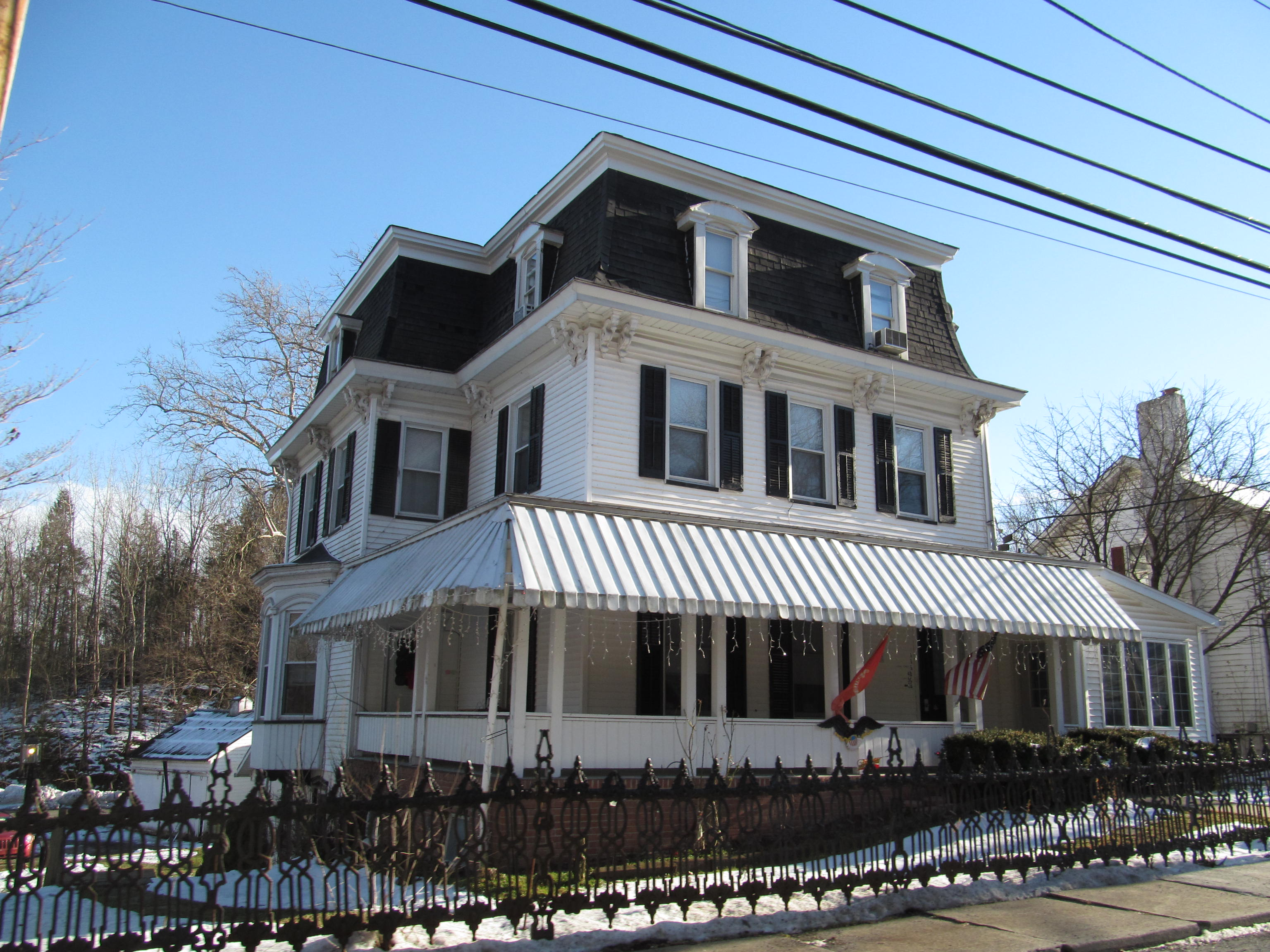

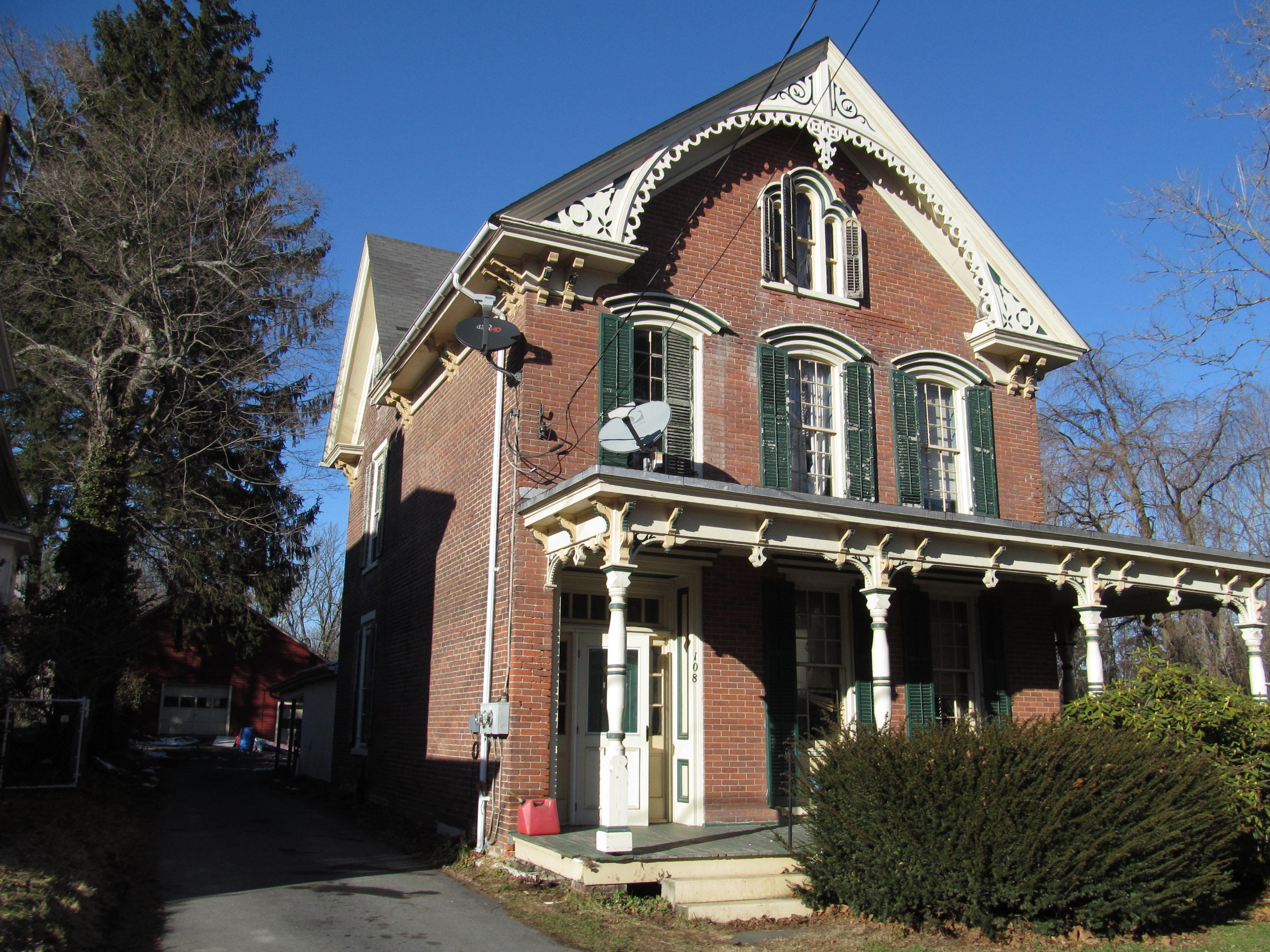

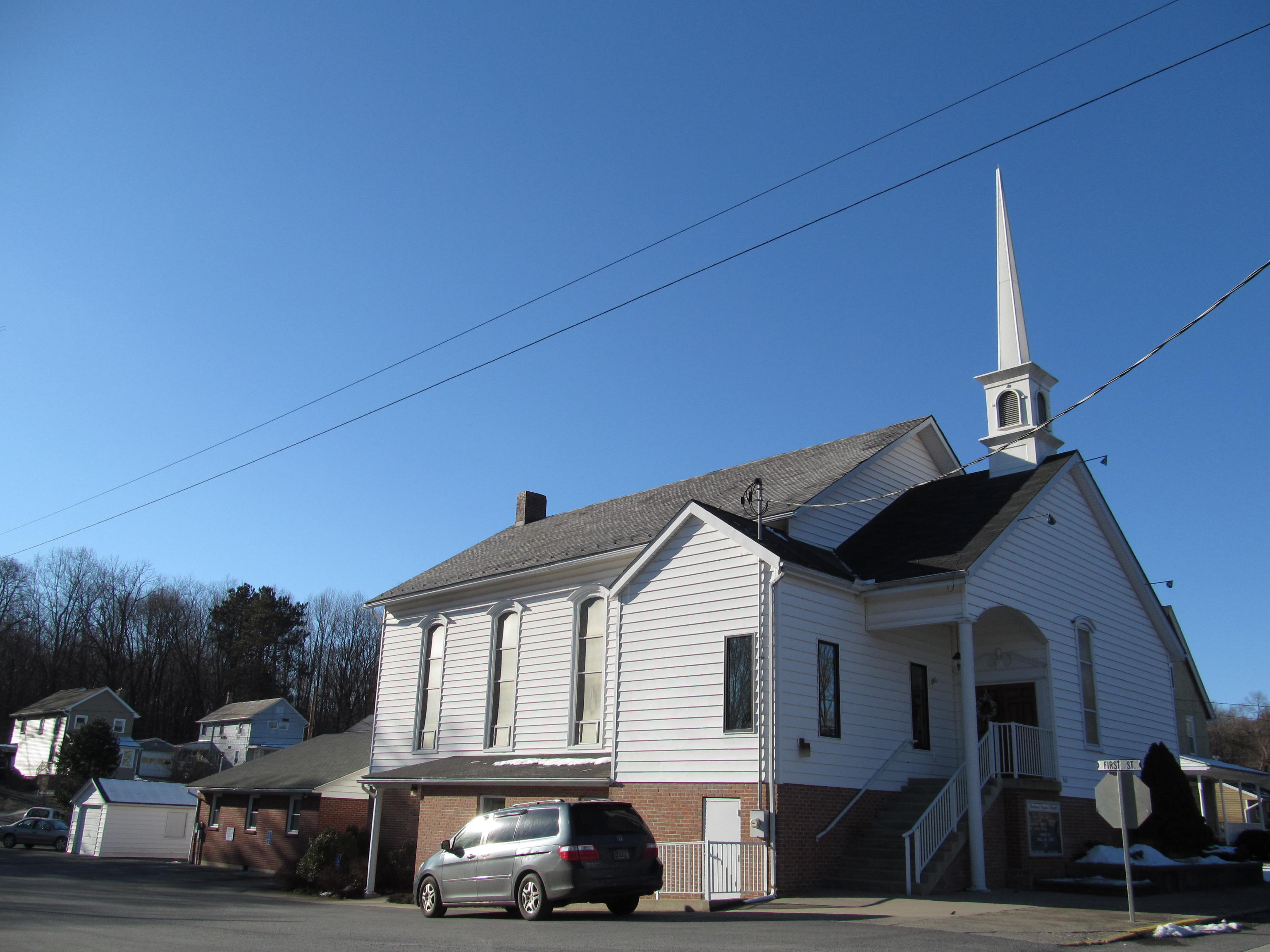

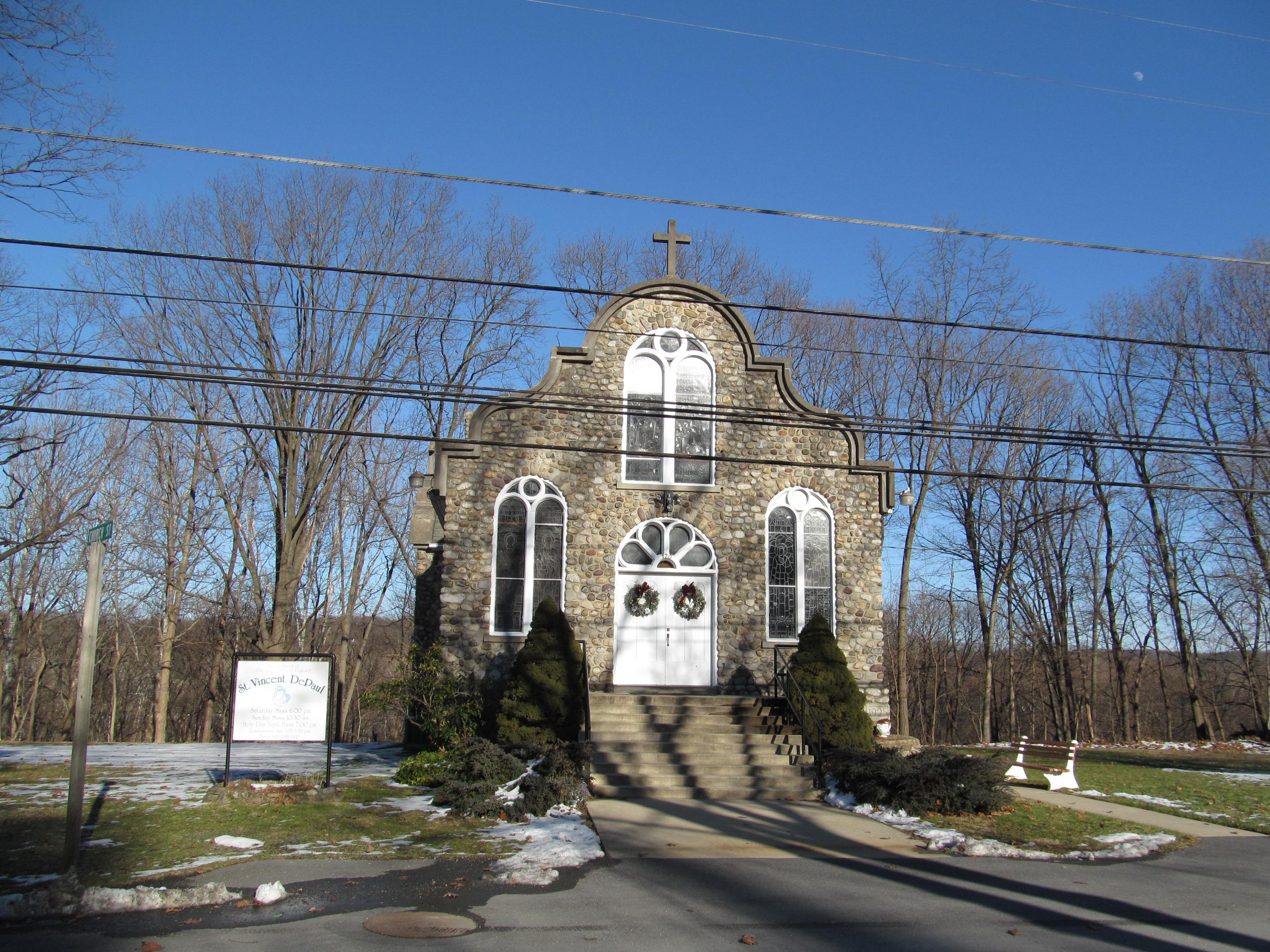

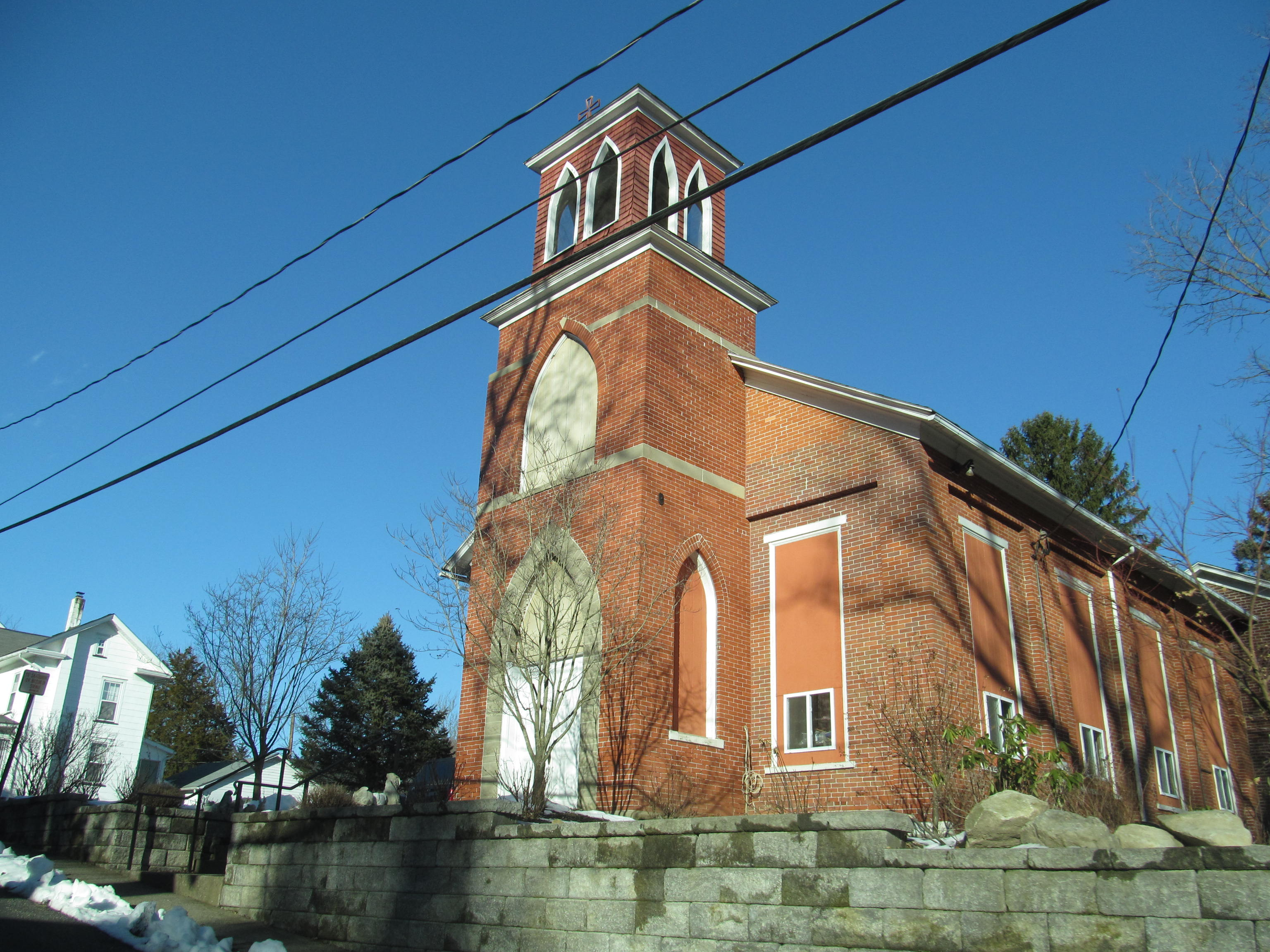
