= East Bangor, Pennsylvania =

Borough in Pennsylvania, US

Borough of East Bangor
- Borough
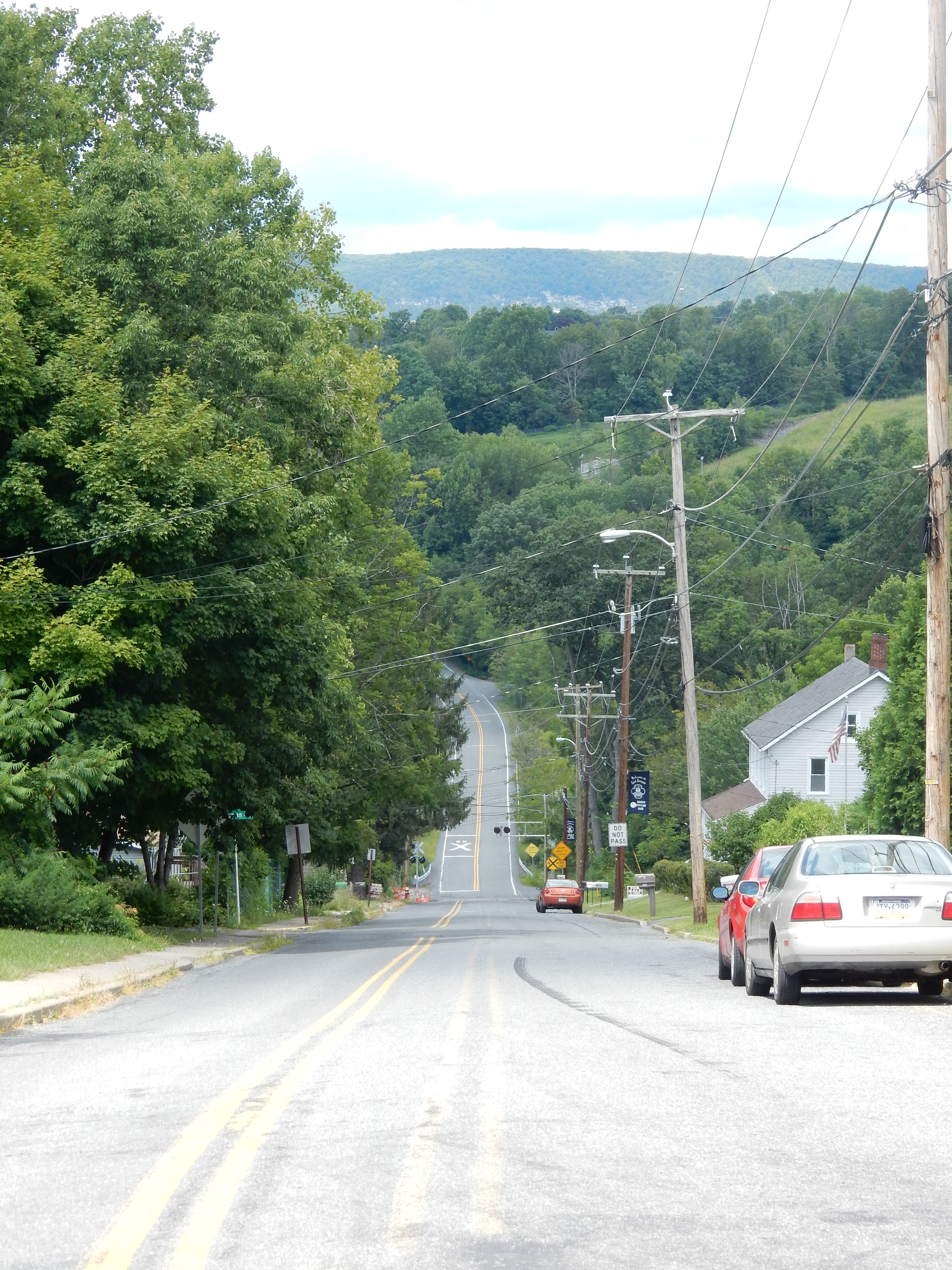
- Broad Street in East Bangor in August 2015

- Location of East Bangor in Northampton County, Pennsylvania (left) and of Northampton County in Pennsylvania (right)

- Location of East Bangor in Pennsylvania East Bangor (the United States)
- Coordinates: 40°52′47″N 75°11′06″W
- Country: United States
- State: Pennsylvania
- County: Northampton

Government
  - Mayor: Natasha Catala

Area
  - Borough: 0.93 sq mi (2.42 km^{2})
  - Land: 0.83 sq mi (2.15 km^{2})
  - Water: 0.10 sq mi (0.27 km^{2})
- Elevation: 640 ft (200 m)

Population (2020)
  - Borough: 1,124
  - Density: 1,352.6/sq mi (522.26/km^{2})
  - Metro: 865,310 (US: 68th)
- Time zone: UTC-5 (EST)
  - Summer (DST): UTC-4 (EDT)
- ZIP Code: 18013
- Area codes: 610 and 484
- FIPS code: 42-20776
- Primary airport: Lehigh Valley International Airport
- Major hospital: Lehigh Valley Hospital–Cedar Crest
- School district: Bangor Area
- Website: eastbangorborough.org

East Bangor is a borough in Northampton County, Pennsylvania, US, with a population of 1,124 at the 2020 census. It is in the Lehigh Valley metropolitan region, which had a population of 861,899 and was the 68th-most populous metropolitan area in the U.S. as of the 2020 census.

== Geography ==
East Bangor is located at 40°52′47″N 75°11′6″W (40.879848, -75.184934). According to the U.S. Census Bureau, the borough has a total area of 0.8 square miles (2.1 km^{2}), of which 0.1 square miles (0.26 km^{2}), or 9.64%, is water.

== Transportation ==
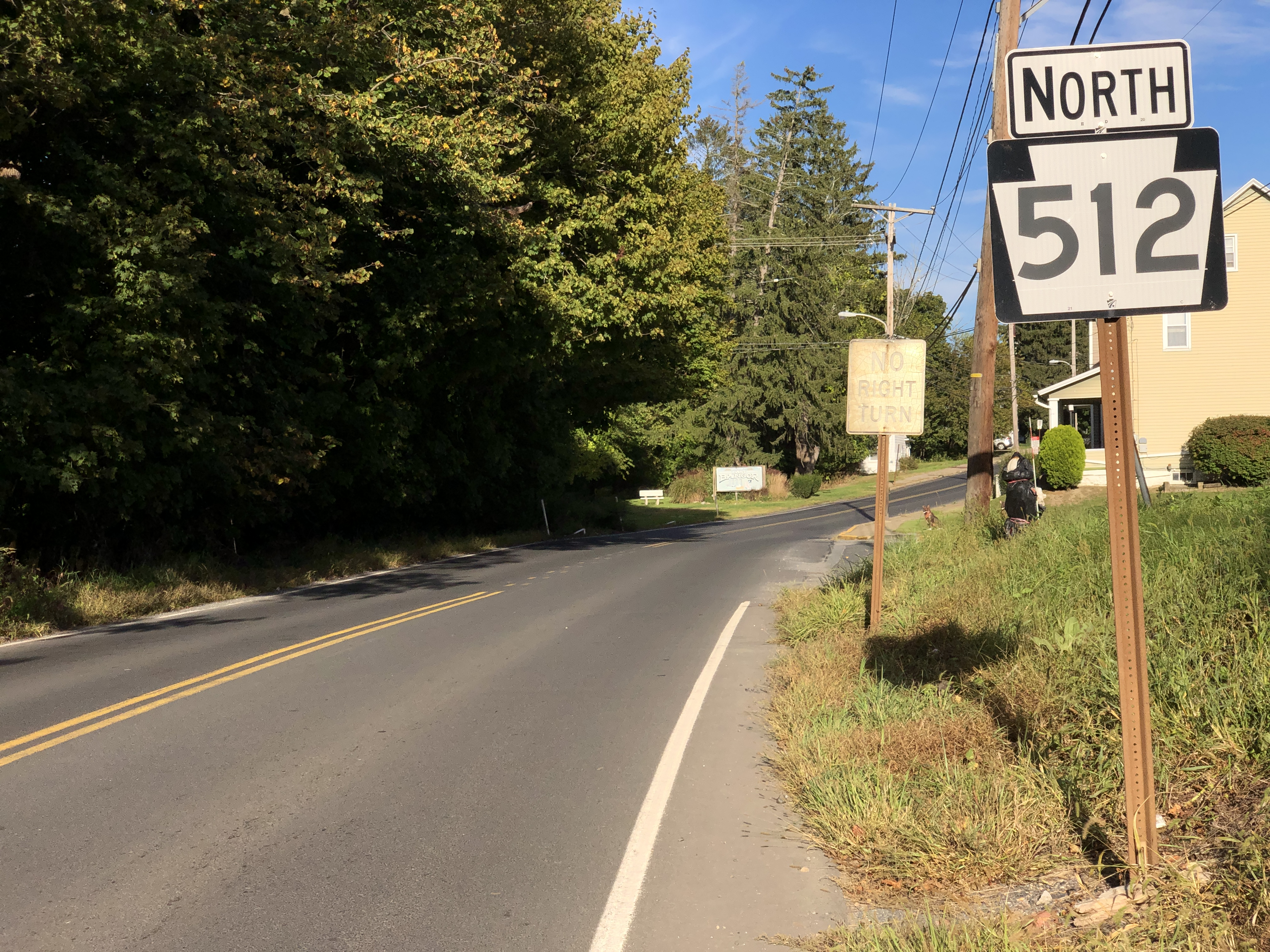
PA Route 512 North in East Bangor

As of 2007, there were 6.21 miles (9.99 km) of public roads in East Bangor, of which 1.86 miles (2.99 km) were maintained by the Pennsylvania Department of Transportation (PennDOT) and 4.35 miles (7.00 km) were maintained by the borough.

Pennsylvania Route 512 is the only numbered highway serving East Bangor. It follows Central Avenue along a southwest-northeast alignment through the center of the borough.

== Demographics ==
Historical population
Census	Pop.	Note	%±
1880	335		—
1890	804		140.0%
1900	983		22.3%
1910	1,186		20.7%
1920	942		−20.6%
1930	991		5.2%
1940	966		−2.5%
1950	988		2.3%
1960	970		−1.8%
1970	905		−6.7%
1980	955		5.5%
1990	1,006		5.3%
2000	979		−2.7%
2010	1,172		19.7%
2020	1,124		−4.1%

As of the 2000 census, there were 979 people, 387 households, and 261 families residing in the borough. The population density was 1,304.1 inhabitants per square mile (503.5/km^{2}). There were 417 housing units at an average density of 555.5 per square mile (214.5/km^{2}). The racial makeup of the borough was 98.98% White, 0.20% African American, 0.10% Native American, 0.20% from other races, and 0.51% from two or more races. Hispanic or Latino of any race were 0.51% of the population.

There were 387 households, out of which 32.8% had children under the age of 18 living with them, 49.6% were married couples living together, 12.4% had a female householder with no husband present, and 32.3% were non-families. 25.6% of all households were made up of individuals, and 9.6% had someone living alone who was 65 years of age or older. The average household size was 2.53 and the average family size was 3.03.

In the borough, the population was spread out, with 24.8% under the age of 18, 9.3% from 18 to 24, 30.2% from 25 to 44, 22.6% from 45 to 64, and 13.1% who were 65 years of age or older. The median age was 36 years. For every 100 females there were 97.8 males. For every 100 females age 18 and over, there were 96.3 males. The median income for a household in the borough was $36,429, and the median income for a family was $42,386. Males had a median income of $31,958 versus $22,188 for females. The per capita income for the borough was $20,056. About 7.3% of families and 10.6% of the population were below the poverty line, including 12.8% of those under age 18 and 9.2% of those age 65 or over.

== Public education ==
The borough is served by the Bangor Area School District. Students in grades nine through 12 attend Bangor Area High School in Bangor.
