= Real Estate (disambiguation) =

Real estate is land property, especially in the context of buying, selling and renting

Real Estate may also refer to:

== Music ==
- Real Estate (band), an American indie rock band
  - Real Estate (album), the group's 2009 debut album
- Real Estate, a 2001 album by English rock band Dodgy

== Film and television ==
- Real Estate TV, a 2004-2009 UK TV channel
- "Real Estate", a 2012 episode in season 3 of the American TV series Haven
- The Real Estate, a 2018 Swedish drama film

== Other ==
- Real property, the legal concept of real estate in English common law
- Real Estate Building, a building in Bangor, Pennsylvania
