= Martins Creek (Delaware River tributary) =

River in Pennsylvania, United States

Coordinates: 40°46′32″N 75°10′29″W

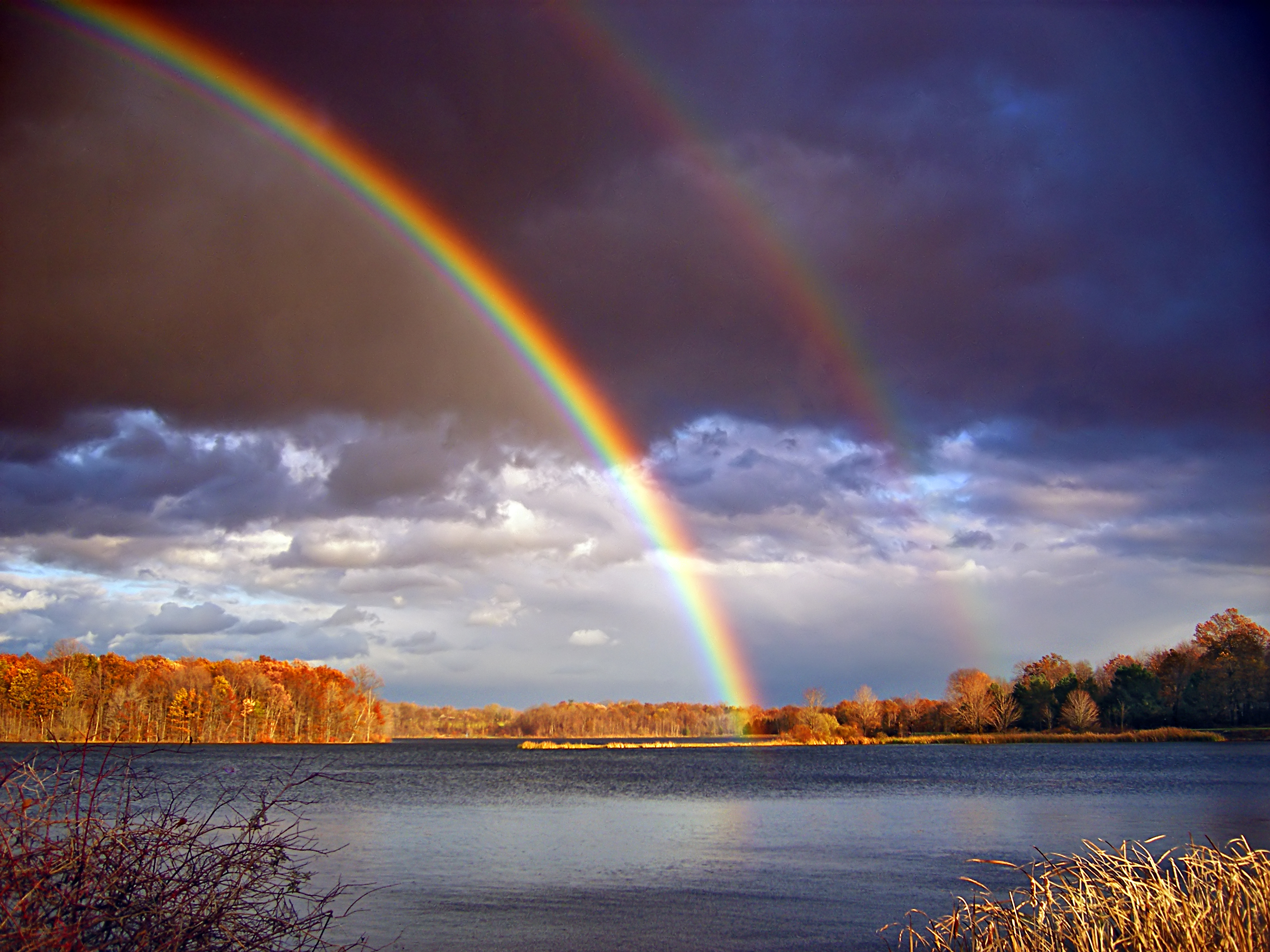
Double rainbow over Minsi Lake

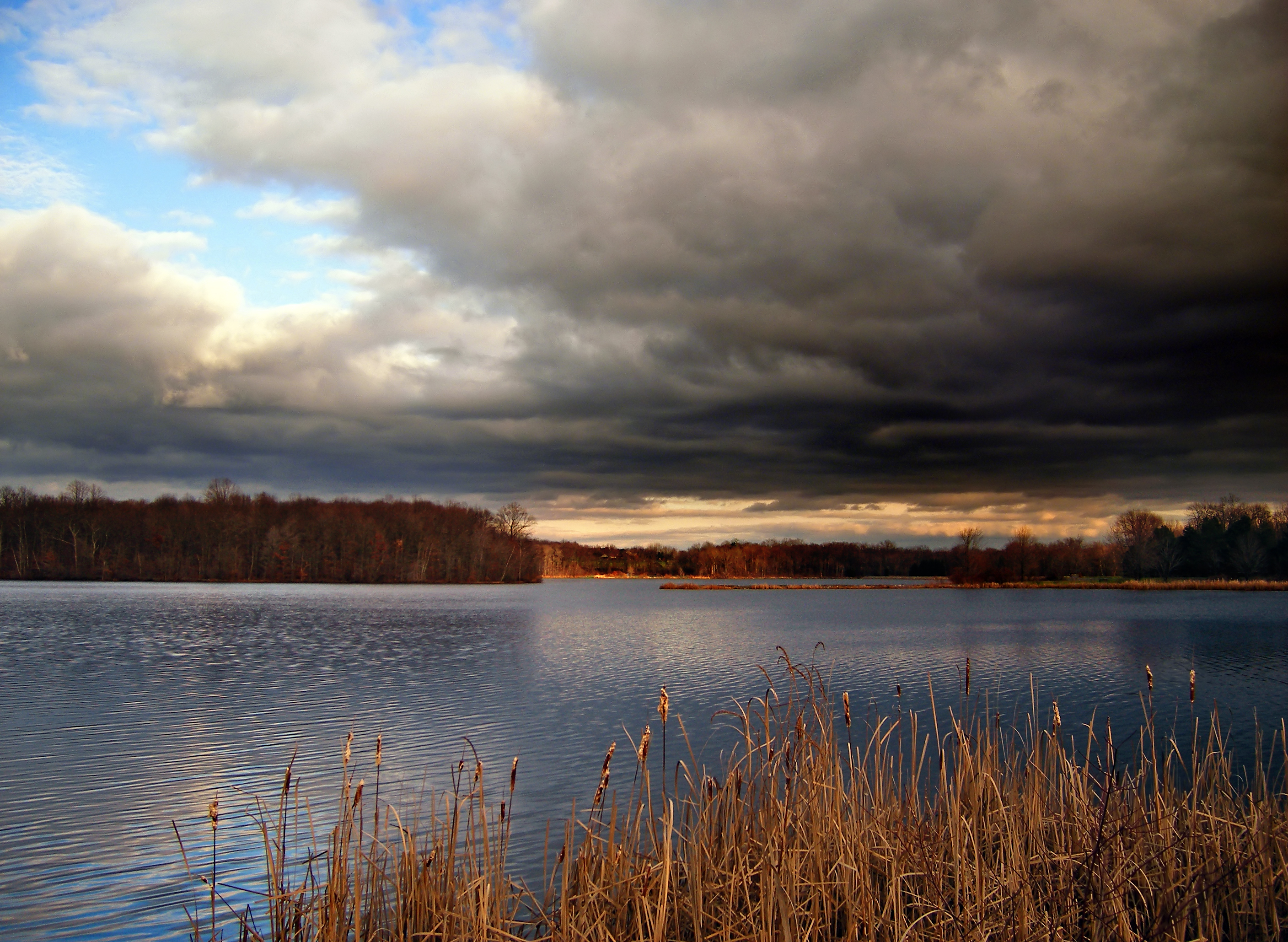
Minsi Lake in Northampton County

Martins Creek is a 10.4-mile-long (16.7 km) tributary of the Delaware River in eastern Pennsylvania in the United States. In all, the main creek and its two branches drain an area of 46.7 square miles. Martins Creek joins the Delaware just south of the town of Martins Creek.

The stream was originally referred to as Tunam's or Turnami Creek, probably of Native American origin. It was known as Martin's Creek as early as 1805, named for James Martin, an early settler to the town Martins Creek, who built a grist mill here around 1747 and later served as a colonel during the Revolutionary War.

== East Fork ==
The East Fork rises to the south of Kittatinny Mountain in Upper Mount Bethel Township, Northampton County. It is impounded to form Minsi Lake, the center of a county park. The largest white perch caught in the state was caught here in 1991. Below the lake, it flows through a swamp and meets the West Fork just south of North Bangor.

== West Fork ==
The West Fork rises in Hamilton Township, Monroe County, where Blue Mountain and Kittatinny Mountain ridges are joined. Flowing northeast, and then swinging east around the end of Blue Mountain, it joins the East Fork just below North Bangor.

== Main stream ==
From the junction of the two forks, the main stream flows south the entire length of Washington and Upper Mt. Bethel townships, passing through the boroughs of Roseto and Bangor, an area heavily marked by slate quarries. A former DL&W rail line, now operated by Norfolk Southern, follows it south from Bangor, where it passes through Flicksville and meets Greenwalk Creek just below Martins Creek Junction at the abandoned DL&W line, and runs northwest to Pen Argyl.

The creek valley then becomes wide, steep, and then increasingly narrow and twisty as it flows further south and meets Little Martins Creek. At the town of Martins Creek, the DL&W line connects to the former PRR Martins Creek Branch (now also Norfolk Southern), and PA Route 611 crosses the creek and runs along it before continuing south along the Delaware River. The creek passes the former Alpha Portland Cement plant, the major industry in the town, and empties into the Delaware River.

== Tributaries ==
- Greenwalk Creek
- Little Martins Creek

== See also ==
- List of rivers of Pennsylvania
