= County Bridge No. 36 =

- U.S. National Register of Historic Places
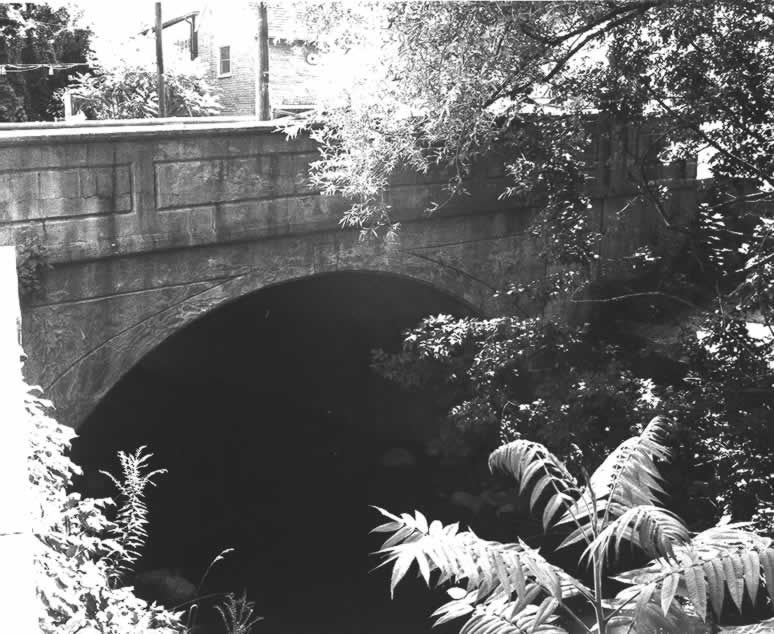
- County Bridge No. 36, 1982

- Location within Pennsylvania Location within the United States
- Location: TR 611 over Jacoby Creek, Portland, Pennsylvania, U.S.
- Coordinates: 40.92136°N 75.0958°W
- Area: less than one acre
- Built: 1907
- Built by: Pasco Construction Co.
- Engineer: L. A. Francisco
- Architectural style: Reinforced concrete arch
- MPS: Highway Bridges Owned by the Commonwealth of Pennsylvania, Department of Transportation TR
- NRHP reference No.: 88000877
- Added to NRHP: June 22, 1988

County Bridge No. 36 is a historic concrete arch bridge spanning Jacoby Creek in Portland, Pennsylvania. It was built in 1907, and is a small, single arched bridge with a span measuring 28 feet. It features an incised keystone and a simply ornamented, continuous concrete parapet.

It was added to the National Register of Historic Places in 1988.
