= Martins Creek, Pennsylvania =

Unincorporated community in Pennsylvania, US

- Census-designated place
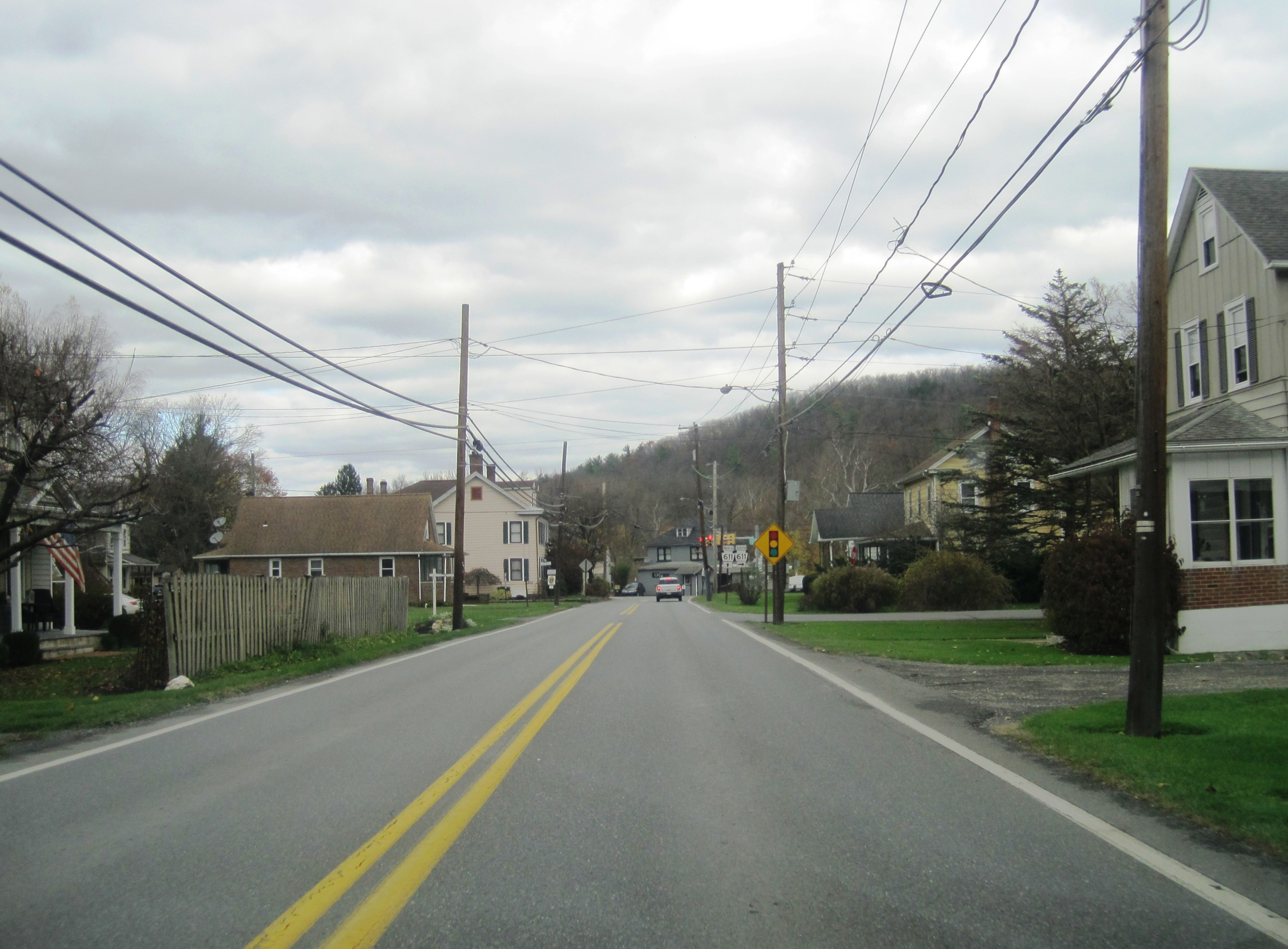
- Front Street in Martins Creek

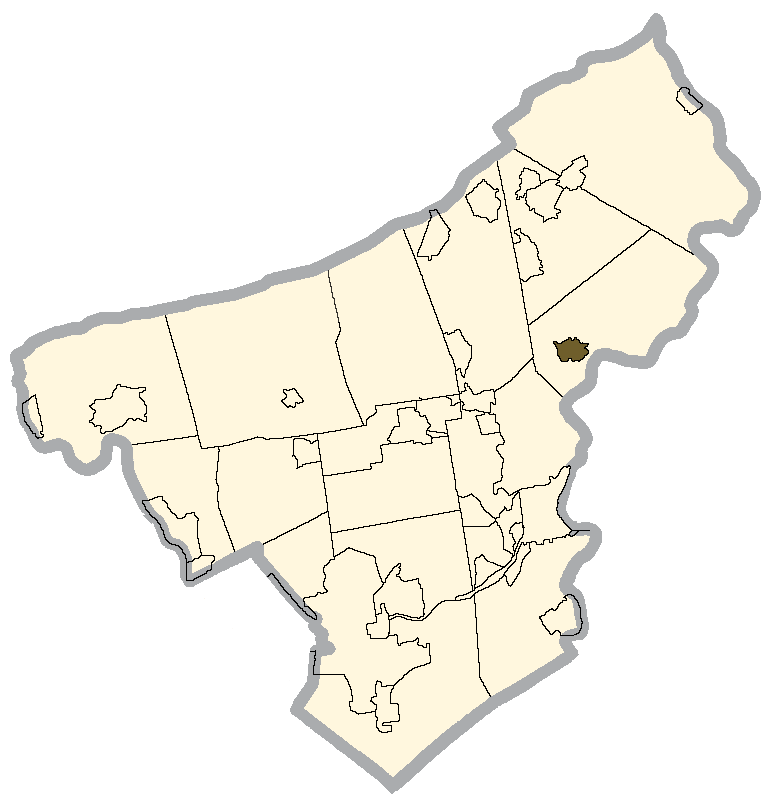
- Location of Martins Creek in Northampton County, Pennsylvania

- Location of Martins Creek in Pennsylvania Martins Creek (the United States)
- Coordinates: 40°47′00″N 75°11′11″W
- Country: United States
- State: Pennsylvania
- County: Northampton
- Township: Lower Mount Bethel

Area
  - Census-designated place: 0.82 sq mi (2.13 km^{2})
  - Land: 0.81 sq mi (2.11 km^{2})
  - Water: 0.0039 sq mi (0.01 km^{2})

Population (2020)
  - Census-designated place: 664
  - Density: 813.7/sq mi (314.19/km^{2})
  - Metro: 865,310 (US: 68th)
- Time zone: UTC-5 (Eastern (EST))
  - Summer (DST): UTC-4 (EDT)
- ZIP Code: 18063
- Area codes: 610 and 484
- FIPS code: 42-47896

Martins Creek is a census-designated place in Lower Mount Bethel Township, Pennsylvania located along Martins Creek. Its population was 664 as of the 2020 U.S. census. Martins Creek is part of the Lehigh Valley metropolitan area, which had a population of 861,899 and was the 68th-most populous metropolitan area in the U.S. as of the 2020 census. The Zip Code is 18063.

Historical population
Census	Pop.	Note	%±
2020	664		—
U.S. Decennial Census

== History ==
In approximately 1730, a number of Scotch-Irish settled in a part of the town called Hunter's Settlement. Martin's Creek was first settled by Robert Lyle in 1741, with James Martin arriving around 1747. Martin operated a grist mill, and later served as a colonel in the American Revolution. In 1744, missionary David Brainerd began his work here with the Clistowackin band of Lenape Indians.

By the 1800s, the area had developed the name of Flatfield because of its level terrain. By the time of the Civil War, it was known as Martinsville, and later changed to Martin's Creek.

In 1939, exiled Russian prime minister Alexander Kerensky married Australian journalist Lydia Ellen Tritton in Martins Creek.

In 1942, an explosion at the Lehigh Portland Cement Co. plant in nearby Sandts Eddy killed 31 people. The Hunter-Martin Settlement Museum commemorates the early history of the area.

The major industry in the area was as the Alpha Portland Cement Company, which closed in 1964.

== Notable people ==
- Alexander Kerensky, former president of the Russian Republic in 1917
- Larry Fink, photographer
