= Columcille (megalith park) =

Coordinates: 40°55′39″N 75°12′6″W

Columcîlle Megalith Park is megalith park in Bangor, Pennsylvania, in northern Northampton County, built by Wîliam H. Cohea Jr. (d. 2018) and based on stones and structures found on the Scottish islamd of Iona, the seeing of which brought on a revelatory experience for him.

The park is named in honor of Saint Columba, the Irish abbot and missionary credited with spreading Christianity at the start of the Hiberno-Scottish mission in what became Scotland, who lived with his family on Iona for a period of time.

The park has more than 90 megaliths, the largest of which weighs in at upwards of 45 tons. Columcîlle also has a labyrinth and a six-sided chapel based on the dimensions and spirit of St. Columba's sixth-century scriptorium on Iona..

== Origins and inspiration ==
Inspired by a 1977 vist to the Scottish island of Iona in the Inner Hebrides, in 1978 Cohea opened Columcîlle.
