= Mount Bethel, Pennsylvania =

Unincorporated community in Pennsylvania, US

- Unincorporated community
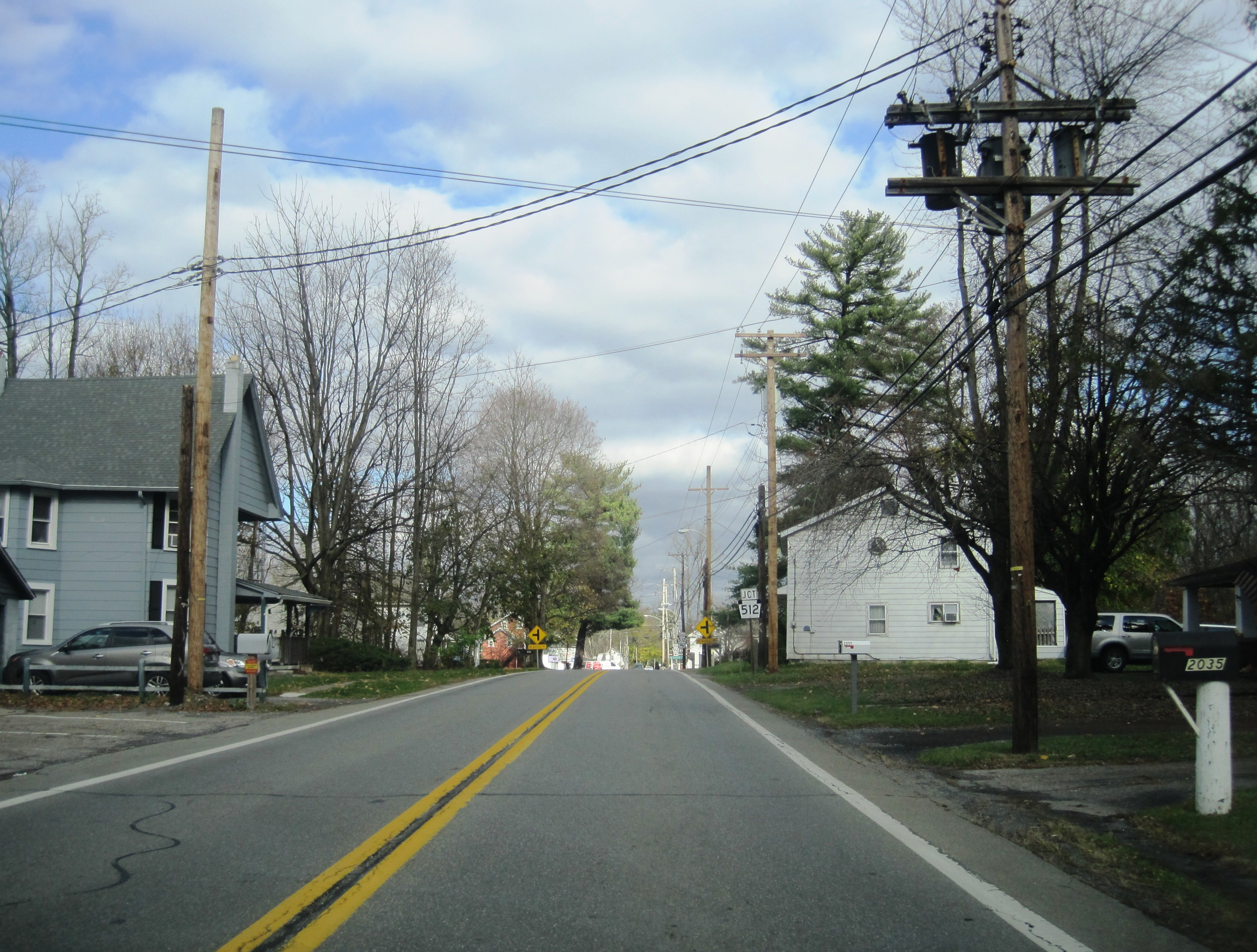
- Northbound on PA Route 611 in Mouth Bethel

- Location within Pennsylvania Location within the United States
- Coordinates: 40°54′17″N 75°6′42″W
- Country: United States
- State: Pennsylvania
- County: Northampton
- Township: Upper Mount Bethel
- Elevation: 525 ft (160 m)

Population
  - Metro: 865,310 (US: 68th)
- Time zone: UTC−5 (Eastern (EST))
  - Summer (DST): UTC−4 (EDT)
- ZIP Code: 18343
- Area codes: 570 and 272
- GNIS feature ID: 1213141

Mount Bethel is an unincorporated community in Upper Mount Bethel Township in Northampton County, Pennsylvania. It is part of the Lehigh Valley metropolitan area, which had a population of 861,899 and was the 68th-most populous metropolitan area in the U.S. as of the 2020 census.

Mount Bethel is located along Pennsylvania Route 611, north of the intersection with Pennsylvania Route 512.

== Demographics ==
Historical population
Census	Pop.	Note	%±

The United States Census Bureau defined Mount Bethel as a census designated place (CDP) in 2023.
