= Real Estate Building =

- U.S. National Register of Historic Places
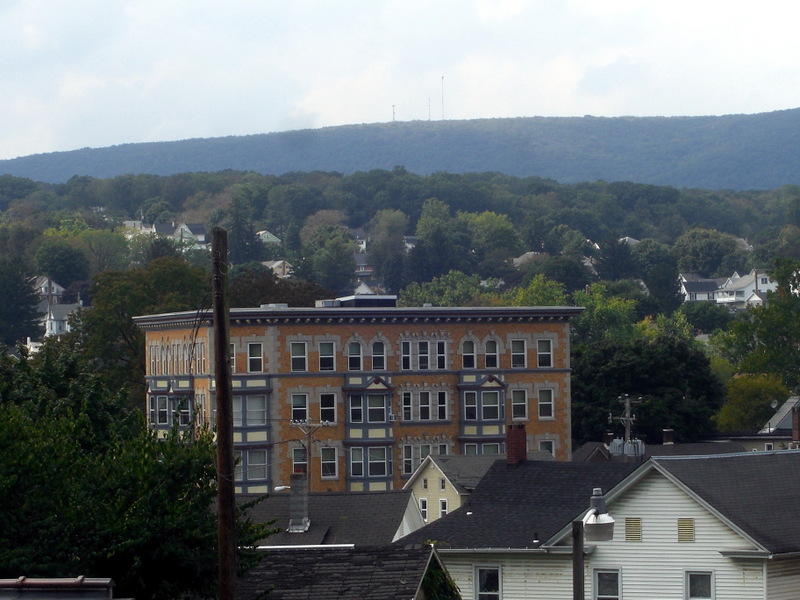

- Location within Pennsylvania Location within the United States
- Location: 2–8 N. Main St., Bangor, Pennsylvania
- Coordinates: 40°52′01.1″N 75°12′17.4″W
- Area: 0.3 acres (0.12 ha)
- Built: 1905–1907
- Architectural style: Italianate, Georgian Revival
- NRHP reference No.: 86000319
- Added to NRHP: February 20, 1986

Real Estate Building is a historic commercial building located at Bangor, Northampton County, Pennsylvania. It was built between 1905 and 1907, and is a five-story, brick and stone building with a 1 1/2 story rear brick addition. It sits on a prominent corner in Bangor and has a curved bay window at the corner. The sides feature two sets of three vertical bay windows. The building has Italianate and Georgian Revival stylistic details.

It was added to the National Register of Historic Places in 1986.

== Gallery ==
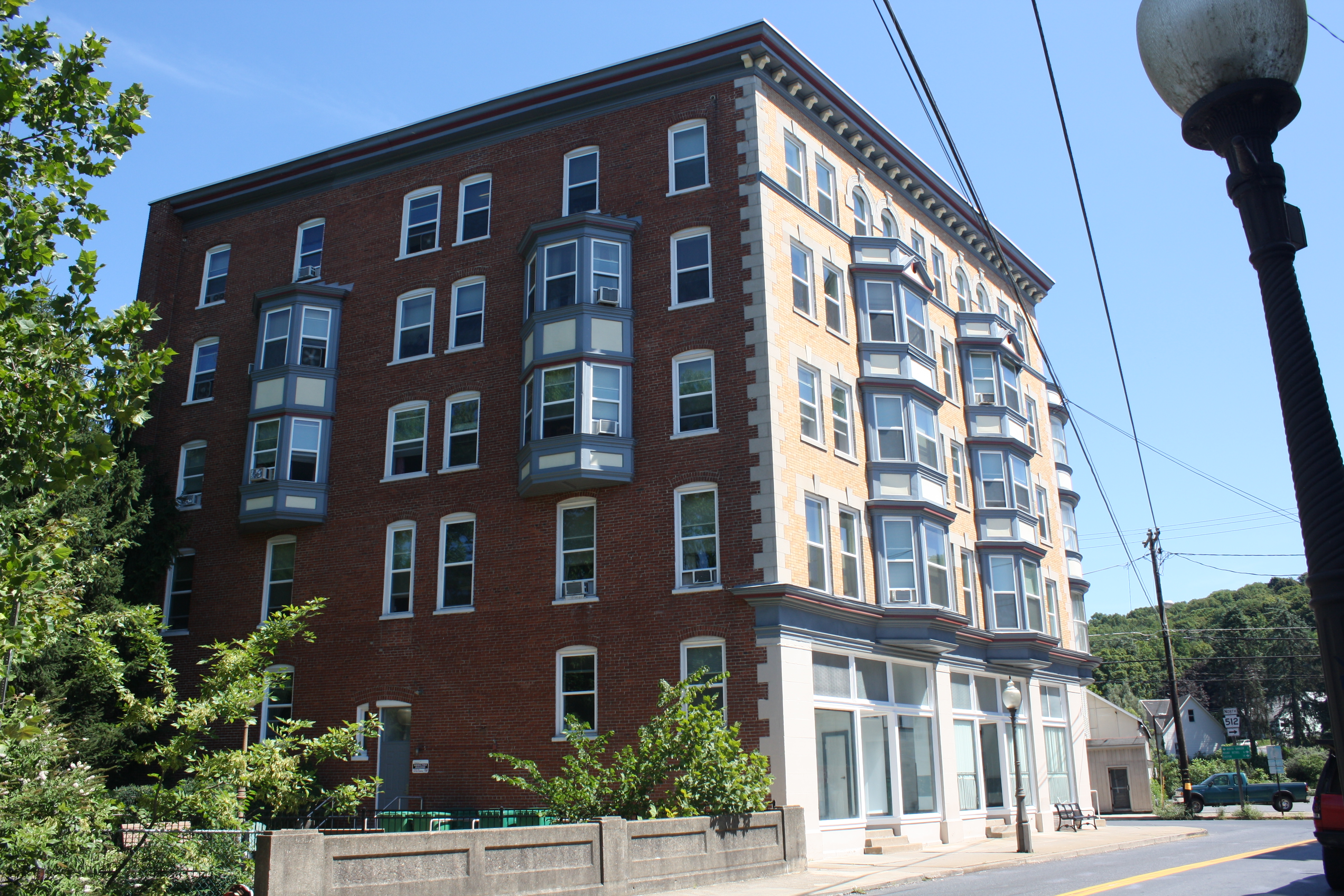
Real Estate Building, view from Market St.
