= Bangor Area School District =

School district in Pennsylvania

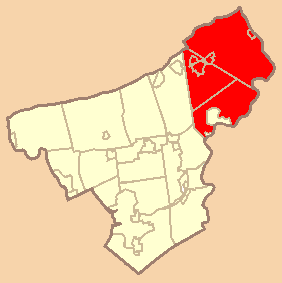
- Location of the Bangor Area School District in Northampton County, Pennsylvania

Address
- 123 Five Points Richmond Road Bangor, Pennsylvania, 18013; United States

District information
- Type: Public
- Schools: Five, including Bangor Area High School
- Budget: $64.569 million
- NCES District ID: 4203000

Students and staff
- Students: 2,749 (2023-24)
- Teachers: 197.65 (on an FTE basis)
- Student–teacher ratio: 13.91
- Athletic conference: Colonial League
- Colors: Maroon and White

Other information
- Website: www.bangor.k12.pa.us

The Bangor Area School District is a midsized, public school district located in Northampton County, Pennsylvania in the Lehigh Valley region of eastern Pennsylvania. It covers approximately 87 square miles (230 km^{2}), serving the boroughs of Bangor, East Bangor, Portland, and Roseto, and the townships of Upper Mount Bethel, Washington, and most of Lower Mount Bethel. The school district serves a resident population of 21,093.

Students in ninth through 12th grades attend Bangor Area High School in Bangor. Students in grades seven through eight attend Bangor Area Middle School. The district operates three elementary schools, DeFranco, Five Points, and Washington, for kindergarten through 6th grades.

As of the 2023–24 school year, the school district had a total enrollment of 2,749 students between all five of its schools, according to National Center for Education Statistics data.

== Schools ==
- Bangor Area High School
- Bangor Area Middle School
- DeFranco Elementary School
- Five Points Elementary School
- Washington Elementary School
