= Bangor Area High School =

- Logo

Location
- 187 Five Points Richmond Road; Bangor, Pennsylvania 18013; United States
- Coordinates: 40°53′5″N 79°9′3″W

Information
- Type: Public high school
- School district: Bangor Area School District
- NCES School ID: 420300003434
- Principal: Joseph Disidore
- Faculty: 57.65 (on an FTE basis)
- Grades: 9th–12th
- Enrollment: 883 (2024–25)
- Student to teacher ratio: 15.32
- Campus type: Rural
- Colors: Maroon and White
- Athletics conference: Colonial League in the PIAA
- Mascot: Slater
- Rival: Pen Argyl Area High School
- Website: hs.bangor.k12.pa.us
- Mascot

Bangor Area High School is a four-year public high school located in Bangor, Pennsylvania in Northampton County, Pennsylvania, in the Lehigh Valley region of eastern Pennsylvania. It is the only high school in the Bangor Area School District.

As of the 2024–25 school year, Bangor Area High School had a student enrollment of 883 students and 57.65 classroom teachers on an FTE basis for a student–teacher ratio of 15.32, according to National Center for Education Statistics data.

Bangor Area High School's colors are maroon and white and its mascot is the Slater, and its athletic teams compete in the Colonial League.

== Extracurriculars ==
=== Athletics ===
Its main athletic rival is Pen Argyl Area High School. The school's athletic teams belong to the PIAA's District XI, and is a member of the Colonial League.

Boys' Sports

- Baseball – AAAAA
- Basketball – AAAAA
- Cross country – AAA
- Football – AAAA
- Golf – AAA
- Soccer – AAA
- Swimming – AA
- Tennis – AAA
- Track and field – AAA
- Wrestling – AAA

Girls' Sports

- Basketball – AAAAA
- Cheerleading – AAAAAA
- Cross country – AA
- Field hockey – AA
- Soccer – AAA
- Softball – AAAA
- Swimming – AA
- Tennis – AA
- Track and field – AAA

=== Marching band ===
The Welsh heritage of Bangor is represented by its band, whose uniforms are modeled after those of the Welsh Guard. The Slater Band has played in the Gator bowl in Gainesville, Florida and won an honorary mention. They have also participated in Disney World's Spectromagic Parade, and went on their "Tribute to Heroes Tour" in Ireland, Wales, and England during Easter Week of 2007. The band's trademark songs include "Men of Harlech" and "Rule, Britannia!"

== Notable alumni ==
- Sound the Alarm, pop rock band
