= Bangor, Pennsylvania =

Borough in Pennsylvania, US

Bangor
- Borough
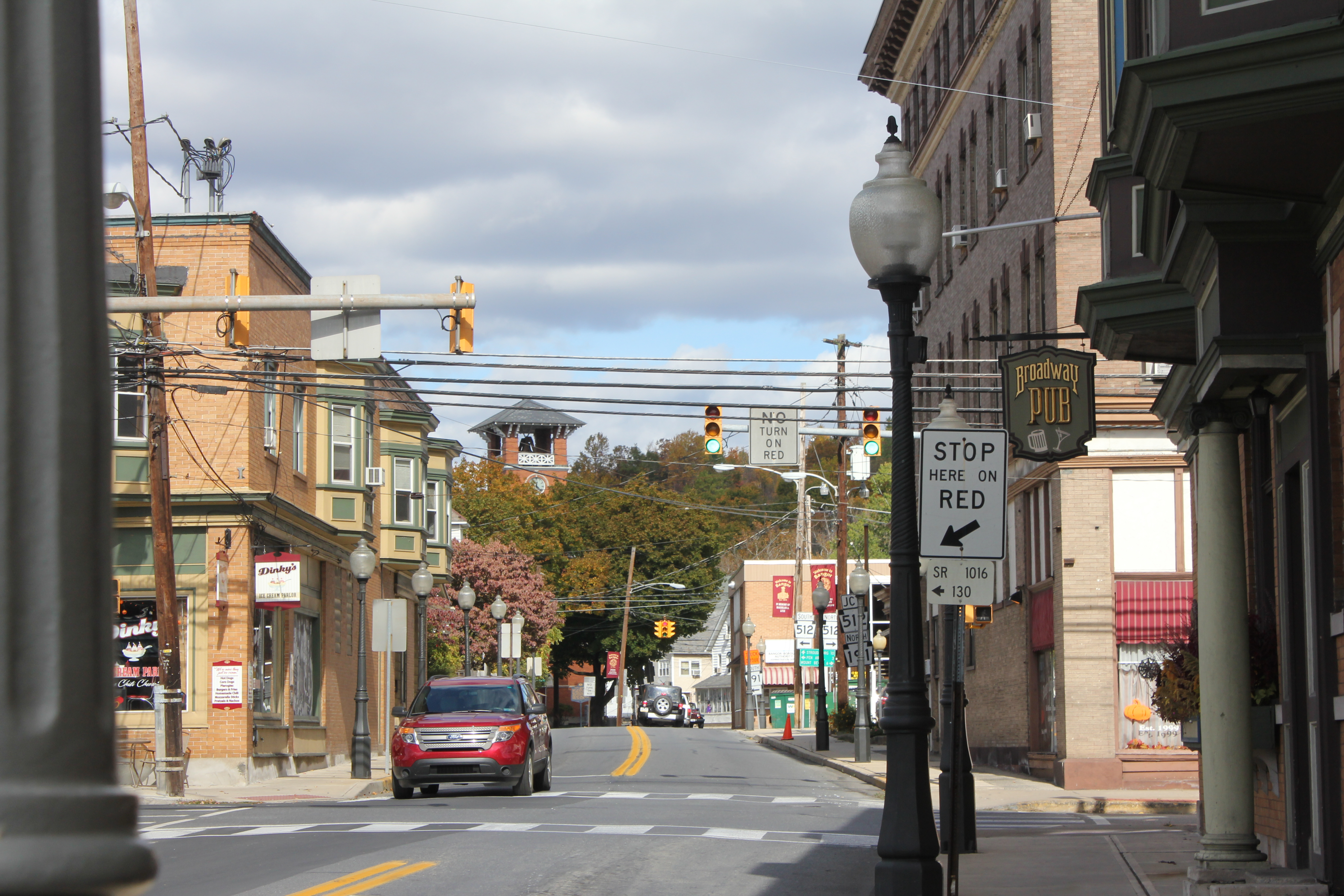
- First and Broadway in Bangor in October 2015

- Seal

- Location of Bangor in Northampton County, Pennsylvania (left) and of Northampton County in Pennsylvania (right)

- Location of Bangor in Pennsylvania Bangor (the United States)
- Coordinates: 40°52′0″N 75°12′39″W
- Country: United States
- State: Pennsylvania
- County: Northampton
- Incorporated: 1875
- Named for: Bangor, Wales

Government
  - Mayor: David McCloughan

Area
  - Borough: 1.53 sq mi (3.95 km^{2})
  - Land: 1.49 sq mi (3.86 km^{2})
  - Water: 0.035 sq mi (0.09 km^{2})
- Elevation: 541 ft (165 m)

Population (2020)
  - Borough: 5,187
  - Density: 3,476.9/sq mi (1,342.44/km^{2})
  - Metro: 865,310 (US: 68th)
- Time zone: UTC-5 (EST)
  - Summer (DST): UTC-4 (EDT)
- ZIP Codes: 18010, 18013
- Area code: 610
- FIPS code: 42-04032
- Primary airport: Lehigh Valley International Airport
- Major hospital: Lehigh Valley Hospital–Cedar Crest
- School district: Bangor Area
- Website: bangorborough.org

Bangor is a borough located in Northampton County, Pennsylvania, United States. It is located 32 miles (51 km) north of Allentown. It had a population of 5,187 as of the 2020 census.

Bangor is part of the Lehigh Valley metropolitan area, which had a population of 861,899 and was the 68th-most populous metropolitan area in the U.S. as of the 2020 census.

== History ==
The borough was settled about 1760 and first incorporated in 1875. The founder and first Chief Burgess of Bangor was Robert M. Jones, an emigrant from Bangor, Wales. He was the prime mover in the establishment of the slate industry in Northampton County. Slate quarries pepper the area, but only a few are still functioning. A life-sized statue of him, dedicated on September 24, 1914, remains in the town center. The influence of Bangor, Wales is visible in the stone walls, square gardens, flowers, and greenery that mirror those of its Welsh namesake. Also like Bangor, Wales, Bangor, Pennsylvania has piles of slate residue and shale reminiscent of the area.

The population of Bangor was 2,509 in 1890; 4,106 in 1900; 5,369 in 1910; 5,687 in 1940; and 5,187 at the 2020 census. The Bridge in Bangor Borough and Real Estate Building are listed on the National Register of Historic Places.

== Geography ==
Bangor is located at 40°52′0″N 75°12′39″W (40.866749, -75.210759). According to the U.S. Census Bureau, the borough has a total area of 1.6 square miles (4.1 km^{2}), of which 1.5 square miles (3.9 km^{2}) is land and 0.04 square miles (0.10 km^{2}) (1.28%) is water.

== Demographics ==
Historical population
Census	Pop.	Note	%±
1880	1,328		—
1890	2,509		88.9%
1900	4,106		63.7%
1910	5,369		30.8%
1920	5,402		0.6%
1930	5,824		7.8%
1940	5,687		−2.4%
1950	6,050		6.4%
1960	5,766		−4.7%
1970	5,425		−5.9%
1980	5,006		−7.7%
1990	5,383		7.5%
2000	5,319		−1.2%
2010	5,273		−0.9%
2020	5,187		−1.6%

As of the census of 2000, there were 5,319 people, 2,105 households, and 1,420 families residing in the borough. The population density was 3,453.4 inhabitants per square mile (1,333.4/km^{2}). There were 2,249 housing units at an average density of 1,460.2 per square mile (563.8/km^{2}). The racial makeup of the borough was 97.9% White, 0.5% African American, 0.2% Native American, 0.3% Asian, 0.3% from other races, and 0.8% from two or more races. Hispanic or Latino of any race were 0.8% of the population.

The plurality of Bangor residents are of German, Welsh, and Pennsylvania Dutch descent.

There were 2,105 households, out of which 35.2% had children under the age of 18 living with them, 50.4% were married couples living together, 11.8% had a female householder with no male householder present, and 32.5% were non-families. 28.6% of all households were made up of individuals, and 14.9% had someone living alone who was 65 years of age or older. The average household size was 2.52 and the average family size was 3.09.

In the borough, the population was spread out, with 27.7% under the age of 18, 6.9% from 18 to 24, 31.2% from 25 to 44, 17.8% from 45 to 64, and 16.4% who were 65 years of age or older. The median age was 36 years. For every 100 females there were 91.1 males. For every 100 females age 18 and over, there were 86.6 males. The median income for a household in the borough was $36,382, and the median income for a family was $44,954. Males had a median income of $36,972 versus $21,414 for females. The per capita income for the borough was $17,742. About 8.5% of families and 13.1% of the population were below the poverty line, including 19.0% of those under age 18 and 15.1% of those age 65 or over.

== Education ==
The borough is served by the Bangor Area School District. The district has one high school, Bangor Area High School, for grades nine through 12, one middle school, and three elementary schools: Five Points Elementary School, Washington Elementary School, and Domenick DeFranco Elementary. Five Points Elementary hosts kindergarten through second grade. Washington Elementary contains third and fourth grade, while Domenick DeFranco Elementary contains grades five and six.

== Transportation ==
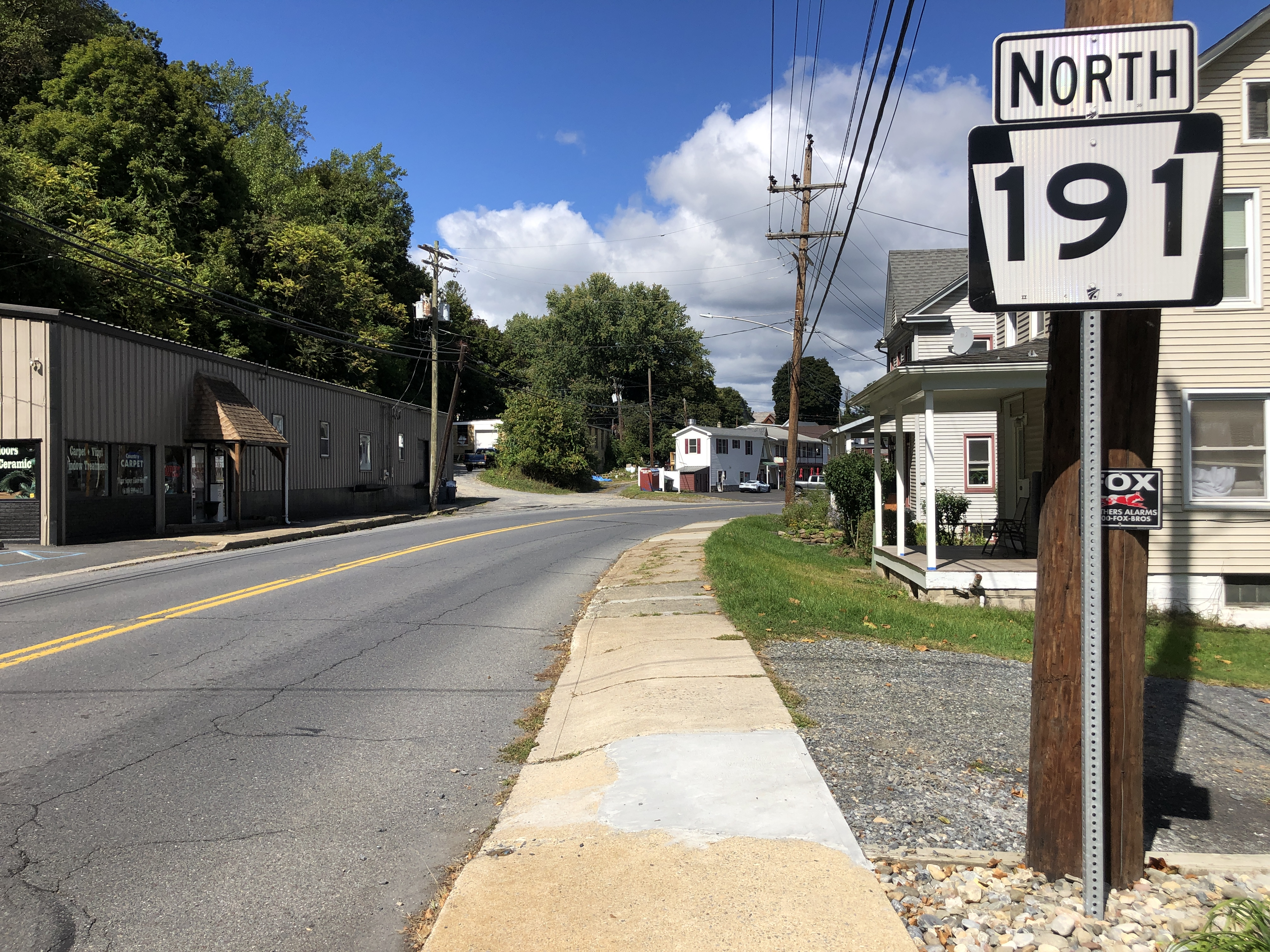
PA Route 191 North in Bangor

As of 2016, there were 21.18 miles (34.09 km) of public roads in Bangor, of which 6.56 miles (10.56 km) were maintained by the Pennsylvania Department of Transportation (PennDOT) and 14.62 miles (23.53 km) were maintained by the borough.

Pennsylvania Route 191 runs north-south through Bangor, leading south toward Nazareth and Bethlehem and north toward Stroudsburg. Pennsylvania Route 512 (signed north-south) runs east-west through Bangor, leading east (north) toward Portland and west (south) toward Pen Argyl and Wind Gap. Bangor is served by the 217 bus to Bethlehem, operated by LANta.

== Minor League Baseball ==
Bangor minor league baseball teams played as members of the 1907 Blue Mountain League and the Class D level North Atlantic League in 1949 and 1950. The team was known as the "Pickers" in 1949 and the Bangor Bangors in 1950. The Bangor team placed sixth in both seasons of North Atlantic League play.

In 1949, when the Bangor Pickers became members of the eight–team North Atlantic League, the Carbondale Pioneer Blues, Hazleton Mountaineers, Lebanon Chix, Mahanoy City Brewers, Nazareth Barons, Peekskill Highlanders and Stroudsburg Poconos teams joined Bangor in beginning play on May 3, 1949.

== Notable sights ==
Bangor is home to the Columcille megalith park.

== Notable people ==
- Carl Henry Hoffman, U.S. Congressman
- George Lakey, non-violent revolution activist and sociologist
- Howard Lesnick, law professor, University of Pennsylvania Law School
- Gladys Reichard, anthropologist and linguist
- Sound the Alarm, pop rock band
