= Mid Valley Region =

Coordinates: 41°28′N 75°36′W

The Mid Valley Region refers to the towns of Dickson City, Olyphant, Throop, and Blakely in Lackawanna County, Pennsylvania, US. The area was once known for anthracite coal mining and is considered a smaller section of the Coal Region of Pennsylvania.

The Mid Valley School District only includes the towns of Olyphant, Dickson City and Throop, although it may sometimes service Archibald and some other nearby locations.
