= List of Athletics minor league affiliates =

Current Athletics domestic minor league affiliate locations

The Athletics farm system consists of six Minor League Baseball affiliates across the United States and in the Dominican Republic. Four teams are independently owned, while two—the Arizona Complex League Athletics and Dominican Summer League Athletics—are owned by the major league club.

The Athletics have been affiliated with the Double-A Midland RockHounds of the Texas League since 1999, making it the longest-running active affiliation in the organization among teams not owned by the Athletics. The longest affiliation in team history was the 30-year relationship with the Class A-Advanced California League's Modesto A's from 1975 to 2004. Their newest affiliate is the Lansing Lugnuts of the Midwest League, which became the Athletics' High-A club in 2021.

Geographically, the Athletics' closest domestic affiliate is the Single-A Stockton Ports of the California League, which are approximately 45 miles (72 km) away. Their furthest domestic affiliate is the Lansing Lugnuts, which are approximately 1,943 miles (3,127 km) away.

== Current affiliates ==
The Athletics farm system consists of six minor league affiliates.

Class	Team	League	Location	Ballpark	Affiliated
Triple-A	Las Vegas Aviators	Pacific Coast League	Summerlin, Nevada	Las Vegas Ballpark	2019
Double-A	Midland RockHounds	Texas League	Midland, Texas	Momentum Bank Ballpark	1999
High-A	Lansing Lugnuts	Midwest League	Lansing, Michigan	Jackson Field	2021
Single-A	Stockton Ports	California League	Stockton, California	Banner Island Ballpark	2005
Rookie	ACL Athletics	Arizona Complex League	Mesa, Arizona	Fitch Park	1988
Rookie	DSL Athletics	Dominican Summer League	Boca Chica, Santo Domingo	Juan Marichal Complex	1989

== Past affiliates ==
=== Key ===
Season	Each year is linked to an article about that particular Athletics season.

=== 1923–1962 ===
Minor League Baseball operated with five classes (Double-A, Class A, Class B, Class C, and Class D) from 1923 to 1935. Class A1, between Double-A and Class A, was added in 1936. The minors continued to operate with these six levels through 1945. Triple-A was established as the highest classification in 1946, and Class A1 became Double-A, with Class A through D remaining. These six levels continued through 1962. The Pacific Coast League (PCL) was reclassified from Triple-A to Open in 1952 due to the possibility of becoming a third major league. This arrangement ended following the 1957 season when the relocation of the National League's Dodgers and Giants to the West Coast ended any chance of the PCL being promoted.

Season	Triple-A	Double-A	Class A	Class B	Class C	Class D	Ref.
1923	—	—	Shreveport Gassers	—	—	—	
1924	—	—	Shreveport Gassers	—	—	—	
1925	—	—	—	—	—	—	
1926	—	—	—	—	—	—	
1927	—	—	—	—	—	—	
1928	—	—	—	—	—	—	
1929	—	—	—	—	—	—	
1930	—	—	—	—	—	—	
1931	—	—	—	—	—	—	
1932	—	Portland Beavers	—	—	—	—	
1933	—	—	Williamsport Grays	—	—	—	
1934	—	—	Williamsport Grays	—	—	—	
1935	—	—	Williamsport Grays	Richmond Colts	—	—	
1936	—	—	Williamsport Grays	Richmond Colts	Cleveland A's	—	
1937	—	—	Williamsport Grays	—	—	Federalsburg A's	
1938	—	—	Williamsport Grays	—	—	Federalsburg A's; Lexington Indians	
1939	—	—	Williamsport Grays	—	—	Abbeville A's; Federalsburg A's; Lexington Indians	
1940	—	Toronto Maple Leafs	Williamsport Grays	Wilmington Blue Rocks	—	Federalsburg A's	
1941	—	Toronto Maple Leafs	Williamsport Grays	Wilmington Blue Rocks	Newport News Pilots	Federalsburg A's	
1942	—	—	Williamsport Grays	Wilmington Blue Rocks	Newport News Builders	—	
1943	—	—	Elmira Pioneers	Wilmington Blue Rocks	—	—	
1944	—	—	Elmira Pioneers	Lancaster Red Roses	—	—	
1945	—	Toronto Maple Leafs	—	Lancaster Red Roses	Martinsville A's	Lexington A's	
1946	Toronto Maple Leafs	—	Savannah Indians	Lancaster Red Roses	Kingston Ponies; Martinsville A's	Federalsburg A's; Lexington A's	
1947	—	Birmingham Barons	Lincoln A's; Savannah Indians	Lancaster Red Roses	Martinsville A's; Moline A's; Niagara Falls Frontiers	Federalsburg A's; Lexington A's; Nyack Rocklands; Red Springs Red Robins; Welch Miners	
1948	—	—	Lincoln A's; Savannah Indians	—	Martinsville A's; Moline A's / Kewanee A's	Federalsburg A's; Lexington A's; Moultrie A's; Portsmouth A's; Red Springs Red Robins; Welch Miners	
1949	—	—	Lincoln A's; Savannah Indians	Martinsville A's	Kewanee A's; Youngstown A's	Lexington A's; Moultrie A's; Portsmouth A's; Red Springs Red Robins; Tarboro A's; Welch Miners	
1950	Buffalo Bisons	—	Lincoln A's; Savannah Indians	Fayetteville A's; Sunbury A's; West Palm Beach Indians	Youngstown A's	Cordele A's; Lexington A's; Portsmouth A's; Red Springs Red Robins; Tarboro A's; Welch Miners	
1951	—	—	Lincoln A's; Savannah Indians	Fayetteville A's; Salisbury A's	Rome Colonels	Cordele A's; Corning A's; Lexington Indians	
1952	Ottawa A's	—	Lincoln A's; Savannah Indians	Fayetteville A's; Harrisburg Senators	St. Hyacinthe A's	Cordele A's; Corning A's; Lexington Indians	
1953	Ottawa A's	—	Savannah Indians; Williamsport A's	Fayetteville Highlanders	St. Hyacinthe A's	Cordele A's; Hopkinsville Hoppers; Welch Miners	
1954	Ottawa A's	—	Savannah A's	Lancaster Red Roses	Drummondville A's	Hopkinsville Hoppers; Welch Miners	
1955	Columbus Jets	—	Savannah A's	Lancaster Red Roses	Burlington A's; Hot Springs Bathers	Welch Miners / Marion A's; Seminole Oilers	
1956	Columbus Jets	—	Columbia Gems	Abilene Blue Sox	Crowley Millers; Pocatello Bannocks	Fitzgerald A's; Grand Island A's; Seminole Oilers	
1957	Buffalo Bisons	Little Rock Travelers	Columbia Gems	Abilene Blue Sox	Crowley Millers; Pocatello A's	Grand Island A's; Mattoon Athletics; Seminole Oilers	
1958	Buffalo Bisons	Little Rock Travelers	Albany Senators	Rochester A's / Winona A's	Pocatello A's	Grand Island A's; Plainview A's; Selma Cloverleafs	
1959	Portland Beavers	Shreveport Sports	Albany Senators	Sioux City Soos	Pocatello A's	Grand Island A's; Olean A's; Plainview A's	
1960	Dallas-Fort Worth Rangers	Shreveport Sports	—	Lewiston Broncs; Sioux City Soos	Visalia A's	Albuquerque Dukes; Sanford Greyhounds	
1961	Hawaii Islanders	Shreveport Sports	Portsmouth-Norfolk Tides	Lewiston Broncs	Pocatello Bannocks; Visalia A's	Albuquerque Dukes; Sarasota Sun Sox	
1962	Portland Beavers	Albuquerque Dukes	Binghamton Triplets	Lewiston Broncs	Minot Mallards	Daytona Beach Islanders	

=== 1963–1989 ===
Prior to the 1963 season, Major League Baseball (MLB) initiated a reorganization of Minor League Baseball that resulted in a reduction from six classes to four (Triple-A, Double-A, Class A, and Rookie) in response to the general decline of the minors throughout the 1950s and early-1960s when leagues and teams folded due to shrinking attendance caused by baseball fans' preference for staying at home to watch MLB games on television. The only change made within the next 27 years was Class A being subdivided for the first time to form Class A Short Season in 1966.

Season	Triple-A	Double-A	Class A	Class A Short Season	Rookie	Ref(s).
1963	Portland Beavers	Binghamton Triplets	Burlington Bees; Daytona Beach Islanders; Lewiston Broncs	—	—	
1964	Dallas Rangers	Birmingham Barons	Burlington Bees; Daytona Beach Islanders; Lewiston Broncs	—	Wytheville A's	
1965	Vancouver Mounties	Birmingham Barons	Burlington Bees; Leesburg A's; Lewiston Broncs; Shelby Rebels	—	—	
1966	Vancouver Mounties	Mobile A's	Burlington Bees; Leesburg A's; Modesto Reds	Lewiston Broncs	—	
1967	Vancouver Mounties	Birmingham A's	Burlington Bees; Leesburg A's; Peninsula Grays	—	GCL Athletics	
1968	Vancouver Mounties	Birmingham A's	Burlington Bees; Leesburg A's; Peninsula Grays	—	GCL Athletics	
1969	Iowa Oaks	Birmingham A's	Burlington Bees; Lodi Crushers	Tri-City A's	—	
1970	Iowa Oaks	Birmingham A's	Burlington Bees	Coos Bay-North Bend A's	—	
1971	Iowa Oaks	Birmingham A's	Burlington Bees	Coos Bay-North Bend A's	—	
1972	Iowa Oaks	Birmingham A's	Burlington Bees	Coos Bay-North Bend A's	—	
1973	Tucson Toros	Birmingham A's	Burlington Bees	Lewiston Broncs	—	
1974	Tucson Toros	Birmingham A's	Burlington Bees	Lewiston Broncs	—	
1975	Tucson Toros	Birmingham A's	Modesto A's	Boise A's	—	
1976	Tucson Toros	Chattanooga Lookouts	Modesto A's	Boise A's	—	
1977	San Jose Missions	Chattanooga Lookouts	Modesto A's	—	Medicine Hat A's	
1978	Vancouver Canadians	Jersey City A's	Modesto A's	Bend Timber Hawks	—	
1979	Ogden A's	Waterbury A's	Modesto A's	Medford A's	—	
1980	Ogden A's	West Haven Whitecaps	Modesto A's	Medford A's	—	
1981	Tacoma Tigers	West Haven A's	Modesto A's	Medford A's	—	
1982	Tacoma Tigers	West Haven A's	Madison Muskies; Modesto A's	Medford A's	Idaho Falls A's	
1983	Tacoma Tigers	Albany A's	Madison Muskies; Modesto A's	Medford A's	Idaho Falls A's	
1984	Tacoma Tigers	Albany-Colonie A's	Madison Muskies; Modesto A's	Medford A's	Idaho Falls A's	
1985	Tacoma Tigers	Huntsville Stars	Madison Muskies; Modesto A's	Medford A's	Pocatello Gems	
1986	Tacoma Tigers	Huntsville Stars	Madison Muskies; Modesto A's	Medford A's	—	
1987	Tacoma Tigers	Huntsville Stars	Madison Muskies; Modesto A's	Medford A's	—	
1988	Tacoma Tigers	Huntsville Stars	Madison Muskies; Modesto A's	Southern Oregon A's	AZL Athletics	
1989	Tacoma Tigers	Huntsville Stars	Madison Muskies; Modesto A's	Southern Oregon A's	AZL Athletics; DSL Athletics	

=== 1990–2020 ===
Minor League Baseball operated with six classes from 1990 to 2020. In 1990, the Class A level was subdivided for a second time with the creation of Class A-Advanced. The Rookie level consisted of domestic and foreign circuits.

Season	Triple-A	Double-A	Class A-Advanced	Class A	Class A Short Season	Rookie	Foreign Rookie	Ref(s).
1990	Tacoma Tigers	Huntsville Stars	Modesto A's	Madison Muskies	Southern Oregon A's	AZL Athletics	DSL Athletics	
1991	Tacoma Tigers	Huntsville Stars	Modesto A's	Madison Muskies	Southern Oregon A's	AZL Athletics	DSL Athletics	
1992	Tacoma Tigers	Huntsville Stars	Modesto A's	Madison Muskies	Southern Oregon A's	AZL Athletics	DSL Athletics	
1993	Tacoma Tigers	Huntsville Stars	Modesto A's	Madison Muskies	Southern Oregon A's	AZL Athletics	DSL Athletics	
1994	Tacoma Tigers	Huntsville Stars	Modesto A's	West Michigan Whitecaps	Southern Oregon A's	AZL Athletics	DSL Athletics	
1995	Edmonton Trappers	Huntsville Stars	Modesto A's	West Michigan Whitecaps	Southern Oregon A's	AZL Athletics	DSL Athletics	
1996	Edmonton Trappers	Huntsville Stars	Modesto A's	West Michigan Whitecaps	Southern Oregon Timberjacks	AZL Athletics	DSL Athletics	
1997	Edmonton Trappers	Huntsville Stars	Modesto A's; Visalia Oaks	—	Southern Oregon Timberjacks	AZL Athletics	DSL Athletics East; DSL Athletics West	
1998	Edmonton Trappers	Huntsville Stars	Modesto A's; Visalia Oaks	—	Southern Oregon Timberjacks	AZL Athletics	DSL Athletics East; DSL Athletics West	
1999	Vancouver Canadians	Midland RockHounds	Modesto A's; Visalia Oaks	—	Southern Oregon Timberjacks	AZL Athletics	DSL Athletics East; DSL Athletics West	
2000	Sacramento River Cats	Midland RockHounds	Modesto A's; Visalia Oaks	—	Vancouver Canadians	AZL Athletics	DSL Athletics East; DSL Athletics West	
2001	Sacramento River Cats	Midland RockHounds	Modesto A's; Visalia Oaks	—	Vancouver Canadians	AZL Athletics	DSL Athletics East; DSL Athletics West	
2002	Sacramento River Cats	Midland RockHounds	Modesto A's; Visalia Oaks	—	Vancouver Canadians	AZL Athletics	DSL Athletics East; DSL Athletics West	
2003	Sacramento River Cats	Midland RockHounds	Modesto A's	Kane County Cougars	Vancouver Canadians	AZL Athletics	DSL Athletics 1 DSL Athletics 2	
2004	Sacramento River Cats	Midland RockHounds	Modesto A's	Kane County Cougars	Vancouver Canadians	AZL Athletics	DSL Athletics 1 DSL Athletics 2	
2005	Sacramento River Cats	Midland RockHounds	Stockton Ports	Kane County Cougars	Vancouver Canadians	AZL Athletics	DSL Athletics 1 DSL Athletics 2	
2006	Sacramento River Cats	Midland RockHounds	Stockton Ports	Kane County Cougars	Vancouver Canadians	AZL Athletics	DSL Athletics 1 DSL Athletics 2	
2007	Sacramento River Cats	Midland RockHounds	Stockton Ports	Kane County Cougars	Vancouver Canadians	AZL Athletics	DSL Athletics 1 DSL Athletics 2	
2008	Sacramento River Cats	Midland RockHounds	Stockton Ports	Kane County Cougars	Vancouver Canadians	AZL Athletics	DSL Athletics 1 DSL Athletics 2	
2009	Sacramento River Cats	Midland RockHounds	Stockton Ports	Kane County Cougars	Vancouver Canadians	AZL Athletics	DSL Athletics	
2010	Sacramento River Cats	Midland RockHounds	Stockton Ports	Kane County Cougars	Vancouver Canadians	AZL Athletics	DSL Athletics	
2011	Sacramento River Cats	Midland RockHounds	Stockton Ports	Burlington Bees	Vermont Lake Monsters	AZL Athletics	DSL Athletics	
2012	Sacramento River Cats	Midland RockHounds	Stockton Ports	Burlington Bees	Vermont Lake Monsters	AZL Athletics	DSL Athletics	
2013	Sacramento River Cats	Midland RockHounds	Stockton Ports	Beloit Snappers	Vermont Lake Monsters	AZL Athletics	DSL Athletics	
2014	Sacramento River Cats	Midland RockHounds	Stockton Ports	Beloit Snappers	Vermont Lake Monsters	AZL Athletics	DSL Athletics	
2015	Nashville Sounds	Midland RockHounds	Stockton Ports	Beloit Snappers	Vermont Lake Monsters	AZL Athletics	DSL Athletics	
2016	Nashville Sounds	Midland RockHounds	Stockton Ports	Beloit Snappers	Vermont Lake Monsters	AZL Athletics	DSL Athletics	
2017	Nashville Sounds	Midland RockHounds	Stockton Ports	Beloit Snappers	Vermont Lake Monsters	AZL Athletics	DSL Athletics	
2018	Nashville Sounds	Midland RockHounds	Stockton Ports	Beloit Snappers	Vermont Lake Monsters	AZL Athletics	DSL Athletics	
2019	Las Vegas Aviators	Midland RockHounds	Stockton Ports	Beloit Snappers	Vermont Lake Monsters	AZL Athletics Green; AZL Athletics Gold	DSL Athletics	
2020 (Note: The 2020 Minor League Baseball season was cancelled due to the COVID-19 pandemic.)	Las Vegas Aviators	Midland RockHounds	Stockton Ports	Beloit Snappers	Vermont Lake Monsters	AZL Athletics Green; AZL Athletics Gold	DSL Athletics	

=== 2021–present ===
The current structure of Minor League Baseball is the result of an overall contraction of the system beginning with the 2021 season. Class A was reduced to two levels: High-A and Low-A. Low-A was reclassified as Single-A in 2022.

Season	Triple-A	Double-A	High-A	Single-A	Rookie	Foreign Rookie	Ref.
2021	Las Vegas Aviators	Midland RockHounds	Lansing Lugnuts	Stockton Ports	ACL Athletics	DSL Athletics	
2022	Las Vegas Aviators	Midland RockHounds	Lansing Lugnuts	Stockton Ports	ACL Athletics	DSL Athletics	
2023	Las Vegas Aviators	Midland RockHounds	Lansing Lugnuts	Stockton Ports	ACL Athletics	DSL Athletics	
2024	Las Vegas Aviators	Midland RockHounds	Lansing Lugnuts	Stockton Ports	ACL Athletics	DSL Athletics	
2025	Las Vegas Aviators	Midland RockHounds	Lansing Lugnuts	Stockton Ports	ACL Athletics	DSL Athletics	
2026	Las Vegas Aviators	Midland RockHounds	Lansing Lugnuts	Stockton Ports	ACL Athletics	DSL Athletics	
