= Quad Cities River Bandits =

American Minor League baseball team

- Davenport, Iowa
Team logo
Cap insignia

Minor league affiliations
- Class: High-A (2021–present)
- Previous classes: Class A (1888, 1934–1937, 1963–2020); Class B (1902–1916, 1933, 1946–1952, 1957–1958); Class D (1901, 1929–1932, 1960–1962)
- League: Midwest League (1960–present)
- Division: West Division
- Previous leagues: Illinois–Indiana–Iowa League (1946–1952, 1957–1958); Western League (1934–1937); Mississippi Valley League (1929–1933); Illinois–Indiana–Iowa League (1901–1916); Illinois–Iowa League (1891); Central Interstate League (1889); Western Association (1888); Northwestern League (1879)

Major league affiliations
- Team: Kansas City Royals (2021–present)
- Previous teams: Houston Astros (1993–1998; 2013–2020); St. Louis Cardinals (2005–2012); Minnesota Twins (1999–2004); California Angels (1962–1978; 1985–1992); Chicago Cubs (1946–1947; 1979–1984); Milwaukee Braves (1960–1961); Chicago White Sox (1957–1958); Detroit Tigers (1951–1952); Pittsburgh Pirates (1948–1949); Brooklyn Dodgers (1936–1937)

Minor league titles
- League titles (13): 1914; 1933; 1936; 1949; 1968; 1971; 1979; 1990; 2011; 2013; 2017; 2021; 2026
- Division titles (2): 2021; 2026
- Second-half titles (2): 2024; 2026

Team data
- Name: Quad Cities River Bandits (2008–present)
- Previous names: Swing of the Quad Cities (2004–2007); Quad City River Bandits (1992–2003); Quad City Angels (1985–1991); Quad City Cubs (1979–1984); Quad City Angels (1962–1978); Quad City Braves (1961); Davenport Braves (1960)
- Colors: Blue, gold, black, white
- Mascot: Rascal the River Bandit
- Ballpark: Modern Woodmen Park (1931–present)
- Previous parks: Mississippi Valley Fairgrounds Park (1929–1930); Davenport Base Ball Park (1901–1916); Sullivan Island
- Owner/ Operator: Main Street Baseball
- General manager: Julia McNeil
- Manager: Jesus Azuaje
- Website: milb.com/quad-cities

The Quad Cities River Bandits are a Minor League Baseball team of the Midwest League and the High-A affiliate of the Kansas City Royals. Their home games are played at Modern Woodmen Park (formerly John O'Donnell Stadium) in Davenport, Iowa, one of the Quad Cities.

== History ==
=== 1879–1959 ===
Beginning in 1879, Quad Cities-area professional baseball has a history that includes three teams. Davenport, Moline (Moline Plowboys) and Rock Island (Rock Island Islanders) all have hosted minor league baseball teams. A fourth area team played in nearby Kewanee, Illinois. Minor league baseball began in Davenport with the 1879 Davenport Brown Stockings of the Northwestern League. With Baseball Hall of Fame inductee Bid McPhee on the roster, the Brown Stockings played with the Dubuque Red Stockings, Omaha Green Stockings and Rockford White Stockings, before the Northwestern League folded after one season. The Davenport Onion Weeders (1888), Davenport Hawkeyes (1889) and Davenport Pilgrims (1891) played before the turn of the 20th century in the Western Association (1888), Central Interstate League (1889) and the Illinois-Iowa League (1891).

In 1901, the Illinois–Indiana–Iowa League or "Three-I League" was founded, with the Davenport River Rats and Rock Island Islanders as charter members. This Davenport team set the foundation of the franchise that exists today. Other charter members of the 1901 Three-I League were the Bloomington Blues, Cedar Rapids Rabbits, Decatur Commodores, Evansville River Rats, Rockford Red Sox and Terre Haute Hottentots. The Davenport franchise changed monikers frequently in the early years, playing as the Davenport River Rats (1901–04), Davenport Riversides (1905), Davenport Knickerbockers (1906), Davenport Prodigals (1909–12) and Davenport Blue Sox (1913–1916). The Davenport Blue Sox won the 1914 Three-I League Championship.

The third Quad City area team was added In July 1914. The Danville Speakers of the Three-I League relocated to Moline and the Moline Plowboys were established. The Moline Plowboys won Three-I League Championships in 1915, 1921 and 1937. A fourth area team, the nearby Kewanee Boilermakers, were members of the Class C Central Association (1908–1913 and 1948–1949). Kewanee won the 1949 Central Association Championship as the Kewanee A's, affiliates of the Philadelphia Athletics (1948–1949) after Moline relocated to Kewanee in mid-season 1948. The Moline Plowboys/Moline A's were affiliates of the Detroit Tigers (1922), St Louis Browns (1931–1932), Chicago Cubs (1937–1940) and the Philadelphia Athletics (1947–48). The Rock Island Islanders were affiliates of the St. Louis Browns (1932) and Cincinnati Reds (1933).

After folding in 1916, the Davenport Blue Sox resumed play in 1929. On May 26, 1931, the Davenport Blue Sox moved into newly built Municipal Stadium, nicknamed the "Muny." The Davenport Blue Sox played in the Mississippi Valley League (1929–1933) and Western League (1934–1937). The Blue Sox were an affiliate of the Brooklyn Dodgers (1936–1937)

The Rock Island Islanders and Davenport Blue Sox faced each other in the Mississippi Valley League championship series in both 1932 and 1933. Rock Island won the 1932 Championship in six games. Davenport defeated the Islanders to win the 1933 Championship in the final season of the Mississippi Valley League. The 1933 Blue Sox were led by Ed Hall's 151 RBI and Como Cotelle's .407 average. The 1936 Blue Sox continued the strong decade, winning the 1936 Western League Championship.

The 1933 Davenport Blue Sox were ranked in The National Baseball Association's top 100 minor league teams (#58). Davenport finished the regular season with a record of 83–32 before defeating the neighboring Rock Island Islanders in the 1933 Mississippi Valley League championship series.

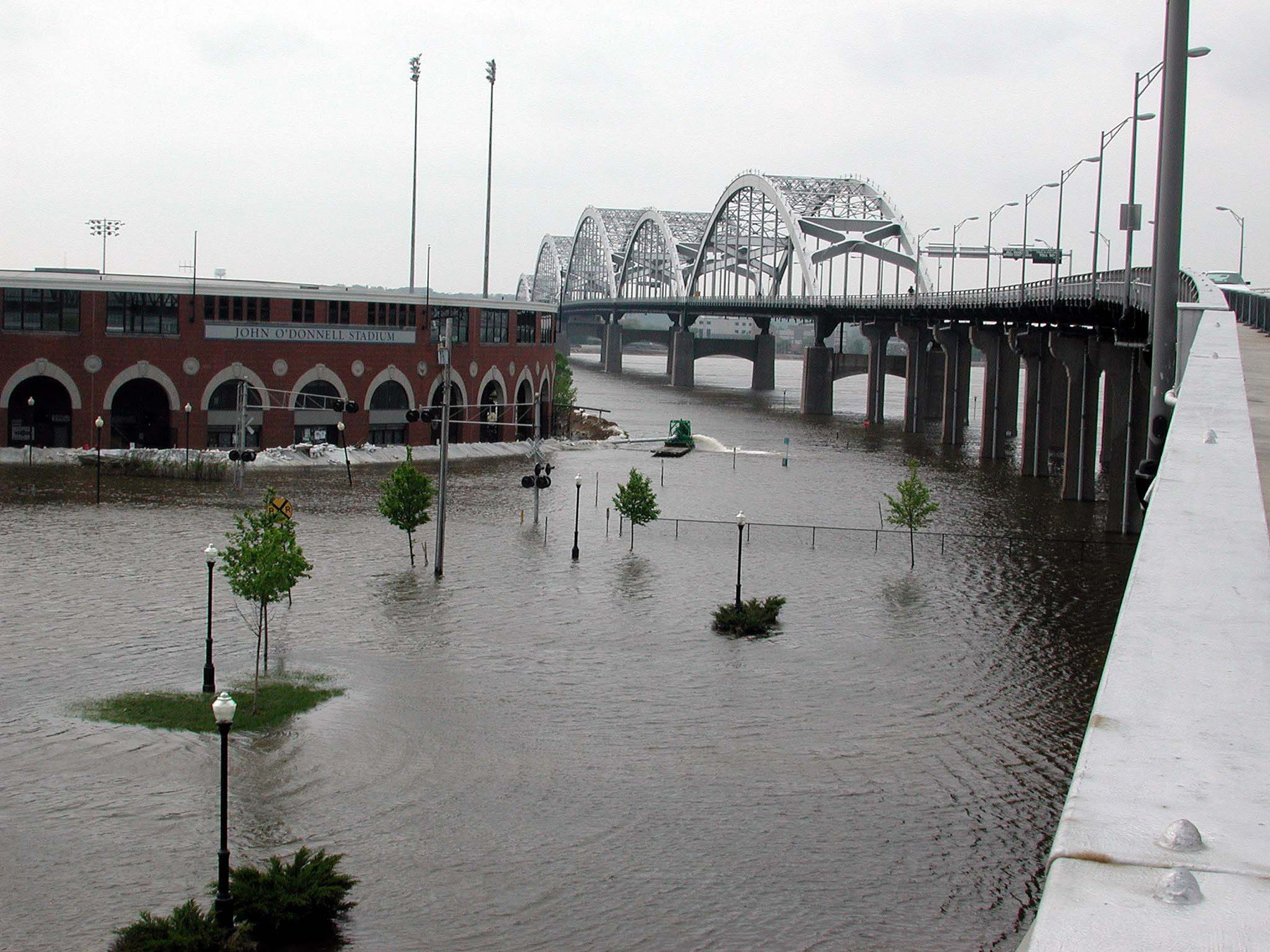
John O'Donnell Stadium, Flood of 2001

The Davenport Blue Sox and Rock Island Islanders were both members of the Western League when the Rock Island Islanders franchise folded on July 7, 1937. The Western League itself then folded after the season, leaving Davenport without a team until 1946. The Rock Island Islanders franchise never played again. The Moline A's (1947–1948) moved to become the Kewanee A's (1948–1949), who folded permanently along with the Central Association in 1949. Moline played home games at Browning Field and Rock Island at Douglas Park. Both Browning Field and Douglas Park are in use today.

After a nine-season baseball hiatus during World War II, baseball returned to Davenport in 1946. The Davenport Cubs (1946–1947) rejoined the Class B Illinois-Indiana-Iowa League (Three-I League) as an affiliate of the Chicago Cubs. Led by future MLB players Roy Smalley Jr. and Rube Walker, the 1946 Davenport Cubs won the regular season pennant.

The Davenport Pirates (1948–1949) were an affiliate of the Pittsburgh Pirates. Bob Purkey, Frank Thomas and future Cy Young Award Winner Vern Law were on the 1949 Pirates. The Pirates swept Evansville, 3 games to 0, to win the 1949 Three-I League Championship. In 1949 Davenport drew 133,505 fans, a franchise record that would stand until 1981.

Remaining in the Three-I League, the 1950 Davenport Quads operated as an Independent team. The Davenport Tigers (1951–1952) were an affiliate of the Detroit Tigers (1951–1952). Baseball Hall of Fame inductee Jim Bunning pitched for the 1951 Tigers. Baseball Hall of Fame announcer Milo Hamilton was the Tigers' announcer on radio. Harvey Kuenn played for the 1952 Tigers, hitting .340. Kuehn was called up to the Detroit Tigers after the 1952 Davenport season ended and won the 1953 Major League Baseball Rookie of the Year Award.

After the 1952 season Davenport folded, and were replaced by the Peoria Chiefs in the 1953 Three-I League. Davenport remained without a team for four seasons. The 1957 Davenport DavSox (1957–1958) rejoined the Three-I League as an affiliate of the Chicago White Sox (1957–1958). The 1958 DavSox advanced to the Three-I championship series, where they were defeated by the Cedar Rapids Braves 3 games to 2. The 1958 season was the last for Davenport in the Three-I League.

=== Midwest League (1960–present) ===
Despite finishing third in the league in attendance (61,522), the DavSox moved to Lincoln, Nebraska after the 1958 season to become the Lincoln Chiefs (who drew 44,783 in the 1959 Three-I League) . This left Davenport without a team for the 1959 season. As a result, local businessman Hugo "Hooks" Kohn started a drive to bring a new team to Davenport. Hooks Kohn was a local baseball enthusiast and a leading pioneer/player of "Diamond Ball", a Davenport game that evolved into today's softball. With Kohn heading the Quad City Baseball Fans Association, a team was secured for the 1960 season as a Milwaukee Braves affiliate, with Baseball Hall of Fame inductee Travis Jackson becoming the 1960 Manager. The Quad City Baseball Fans Association would oversee operation of the Davenport franchise from 1960 through 1986.

The 1960 Davenport Braves became a member of the fledgling Midwest League, a partnership that has continued without interruption in seven decades. The 1960 Davenport Braves joined the Waterloo Hawks, Keokuk Cardinals, Dubuque Packers, Clinton C-Sox, Kokomo Dodgers, Quincy Giants and Decatur Commodores to form the 8-team 1960 Midwest League. The creation of the Midwest League essentially ended the Three-I, which folded after the 1961 season. In its long history, the Illinois-Indiana-Iowa League hosted teams in 31 cities.

In 1961, the franchise permanently dropped "Davenport" and became the "Quad City" Braves. In 1962, the Quad City Angels became an affiliate of the expansion Los Angeles Angels. The affiliate change occurred because Cedar Rapids, also a Braves affiliate, was one of six former Three-I teams that joined the Midwest League in 1962 when the Three-I folded. Thus began a lengthy franchise affiliation with the Angels. The Quad City Angels of 1963 and 1964 were managed by Chuck Tanner and the 1964 Angels became the first Midwest League franchise to draw more than 100,000 fans in a season. The Quad City Angels won the 1968 and 1971 Midwest League titles.

The Angels affiliation ran from 1962 through the 1992 season, minus the six-year affiliation with the Chicago Cubs (1979–1984), with the Quad Cities Cubs winning the 1979 Midwest League Championship. Quad Cities was an affiliate of the Houston Astros (1993–1998), Minnesota Twins (1999–2004), St. Louis Cardinals (2005–2012) Houston Astros (2013–2020), and Kansas City Royals (from 2021).

In conjunction with Major League Baseball's restructuring of Minor League Baseball in 2021, the River Bandits were organized into the High-A Central. In 2022, the High-A Central became known as the Midwest League, the name historically used by the regional circuit prior to the 2021 reorganization.

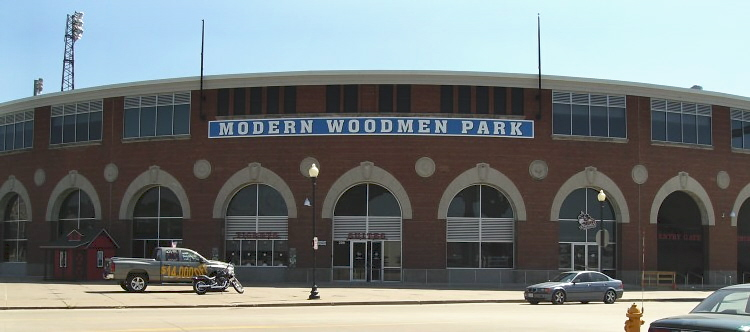
The River Bandits play at Modern Woodmen Park in Davenport

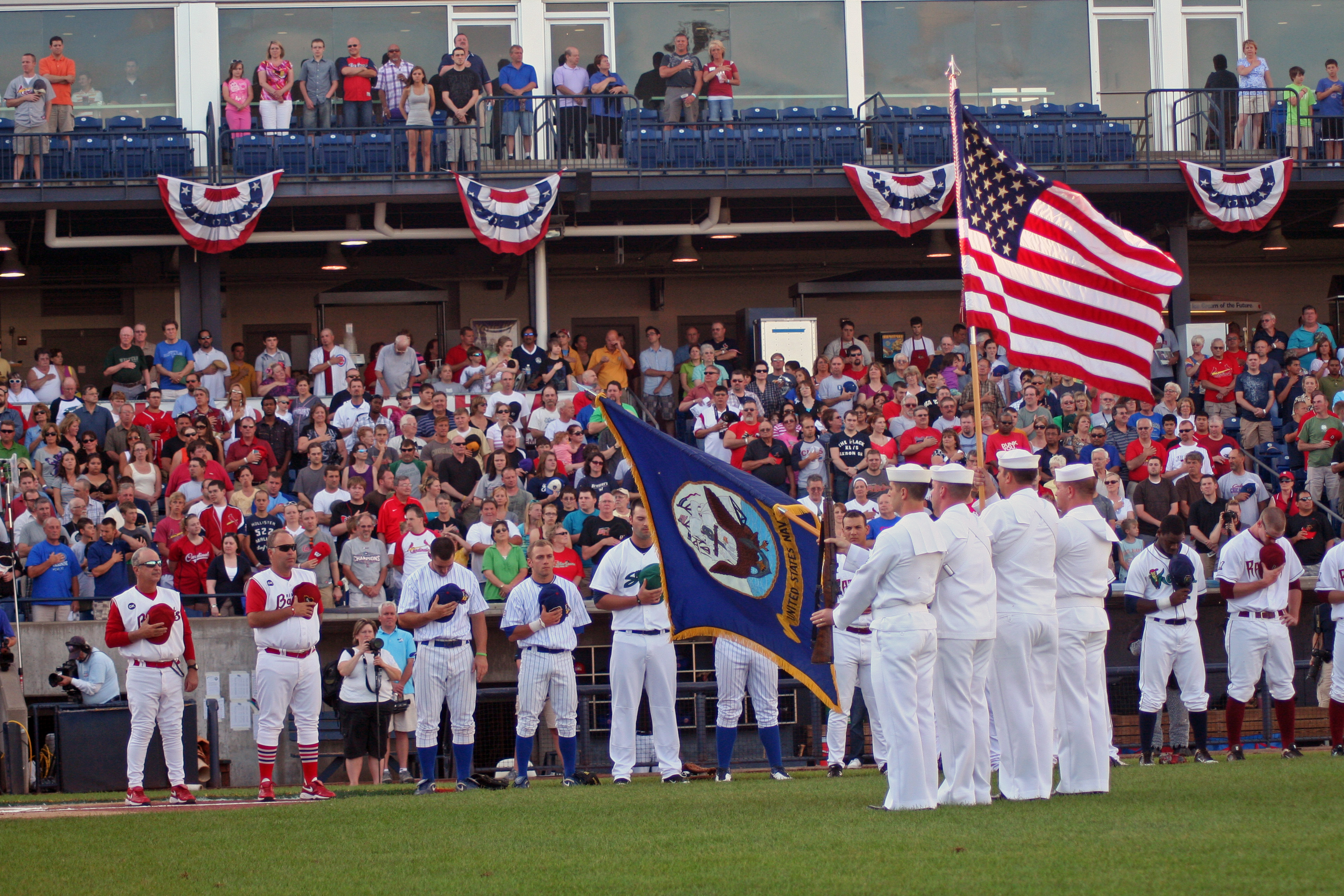
US Navy parades the colors during opening ceremonies for the 2011 All-Star Game

=== Franchise monikers ===
The Davenport franchise used "Davenport" before changing to "Quad City" in 1962, as other local minor league franchises had folded. The franchise generally used the nickname of its major-league affiliate from 1946 through the 1991 season. This changed in 1992, when the team created its own nickname in a "name the team' contest. The contest winning name was: "Quad City River Bandits" and from 1992 through the 2003 the team kept this name. On October 20, 2003, the team was renamed the "Swing of the Quad Cities"; after another "name the team" contest was held. However, On December 13, 2007, returned to the "Quad Cities River Bandits" after voters in a third contest chose the River Bandits name over "The Swing" and four other finalists: "Channel Cats", "The Current", "River Eagles", and "Talons."

The renaming of the Bandits has proven to be one of sports’ most successful re-branding campaigns – merchandise sales after the 2008 re-branding increased more than 400% (and were up an additional 34% in 2009), sponsorship jumped more than 64% in the first season, and CNBC named the team's logo one of the top eight in minor league baseball.

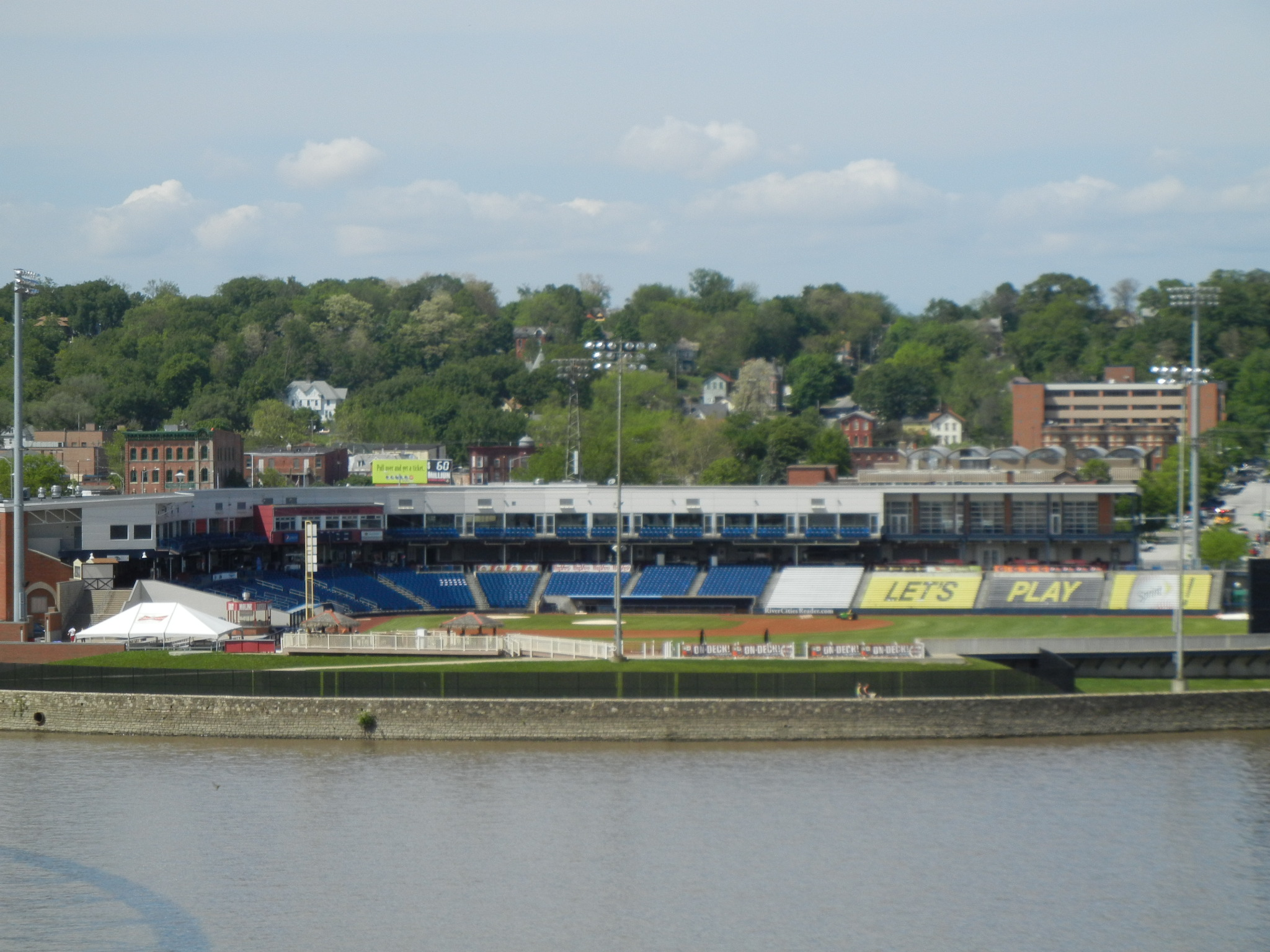
Modern Woodmen Park 2

=== History of franchise ownership ===
After success in securing a Midwest League Franchise for Davenport beginning with the 1960 season, the non-profit Quad City Baseball Fans Association continued to operate the franchise from 1960 to 1986. In 1986 Chicago businessman Harry H. Semrow purchased the team from the association for $350,000, but Semrow was forced to sell after the 1987 season due to poor health.

Richard Holtzman, another Chicago businessman who owned as many as five minor league teams, purchased the franchise from Semrow and remained as owner from 1987 until 1998. In 1998, Holtzman sold the team to Seventh Inning Stretch, a company owned by Kevin Krause, a businessman out of Mason City, Iowa, and son of Kum & Go co-founder William Krause.

On December 28, 2006, Krause agreed to sell the team to Florida-based Main Street Baseball for an undisclosed price; the sale was completed on November 29, 2007.

Under Main Street Baseball's ownership, led by Dave Heller and Bob Herrfeldt, the River Bandits sparked a stunning resurgence of baseball in the Quad Cities, winning league championships in 2011 and 2013, setting new attendance records and capturing numerous awards for their innovative promotions.

Since Heller and Herrfeldt took over the Bandits, sponsorship sales, suite sales, ticket sales, and concession sales have all seen annual increases. The team's average attendance in its first year under Main Street rose by more than 56%, the largest such increase in baseball, and has climbed to nearly 3,700 fans per game. The Bandits have also led one of sports' most successful rebranding campaigns – merchandise sales after the 2008 rebranding increased more than 400%, and increased an additional 34% in 2009. Sponsorships increased more than 64% in the first season, and CNBC named the team's logo one of the top eight in minor league baseball.

Main Street Baseball has also been a trail-blazer, having hired the Midwest League's only female general manager (Stefanie Brown), then hiring the only African-American GM in minor league baseball. The River Bandits have also consistently had more women in leadership positions than most any team in baseball, and are the only minor league club to have won back-to-back Diversity Economic Impact Engagement (DEIE) Scholarships from major league baseball since MLB started awarding them in 2012.

The River Bandits have been voted Best Family Entertainment by the Quad-City Times for each of the past five years and were recently voted by the River Cities Reader as "The Best Place for An Inexpensive Date that Doesn't Look Like It." The team won the prestigious "Golden Bobblehead" award in 2013 for best charitable promotion in Minor League Baseball for its innovative "Photo Jersey Auction" to benefit Autism Awareness. It also won a "Veeckie Award" from ESPN in 2009 for best minor league promotion ("Tattoo Night") and the "Promotion of the Year" Award from Ballpark Digest the same year for the team's "Mega-Candy Drop", as well as a Gold Award from the U.S. Army for its community service. The team has also won repeated awards for Heller's creative TV and radio ads, which have repeatedly been recognized as among the best in the industry.

== Ballparks ==
Early Davenport teams played Sunday games on Sullivan Island outside of town, presumably to avoid Sunday activity laws.

The Davenport teams of 1901–1916, ending with the Davenport Blue Sox, played at Davenport Base Ball Park. It was also called "Blue Sox Stadium". The ballpark was located at Bowditch & Second Streets, or Third Street & Telegraph Road in Davenport, Iowa.

The Davenport Blue Sox of 1929 and 1930 played at Fairgrounds Park, located within the Mississippi Valley Fairgrounds in Davenport, Iowa. the ballpark was also known as "Blue Sox Ball Park." The ballpark had a capacity of 5,500 (1929). Located at West Locust & North Clark Street, with an address of 2815 West Locust Street Davenport, Iowa. The Mississippi Valley Fairgrounds are still in use today.

Playing at the Mississippi Valley Fairgrounds, the city of Davenport realized a stadium was needed. The city preferred a Mississippi River riverfront location near downtown and a lighted stadium. Subsequently, the Davenport Levee Commission proposed a new, lighted, brick stadium along the Davenport riverfront.

On May 26, 1931, the new Municipal Stadium opened. It is still the franchise ballpark today. With a site on the banks of the Mississippi River, the new stadium was constructed entirely with local labor for a total construction cost $165,000. It had light towers (first night game was June 4, 1931) with the grandstand facing the Mississippi River. Municipal Stadium was fondly nicknamed "The Muny." In 1971, Municipal Stadium was renamed John O'Donnell Stadium after the longtime sports editor of the Quad-City Times. Over time, the ballpark has shown its unique view, versatility and staying power, continuing to host baseball today as Modern Woodmen Park.

Many baseball events have been held at the Stadium through the years. Some of historical note:

- Hosting eight Midwest League All-Star Games in six different decades: 1964, 1968, 1975, 1980, 1982, 1990, 2006 and 2011
- The Davenport Blue Sox had several exhibitions against Negro league teams in the 1930s.
- The Major League St. Louis Browns played the Pittsburgh Pirates in a 1942 exhibition game.

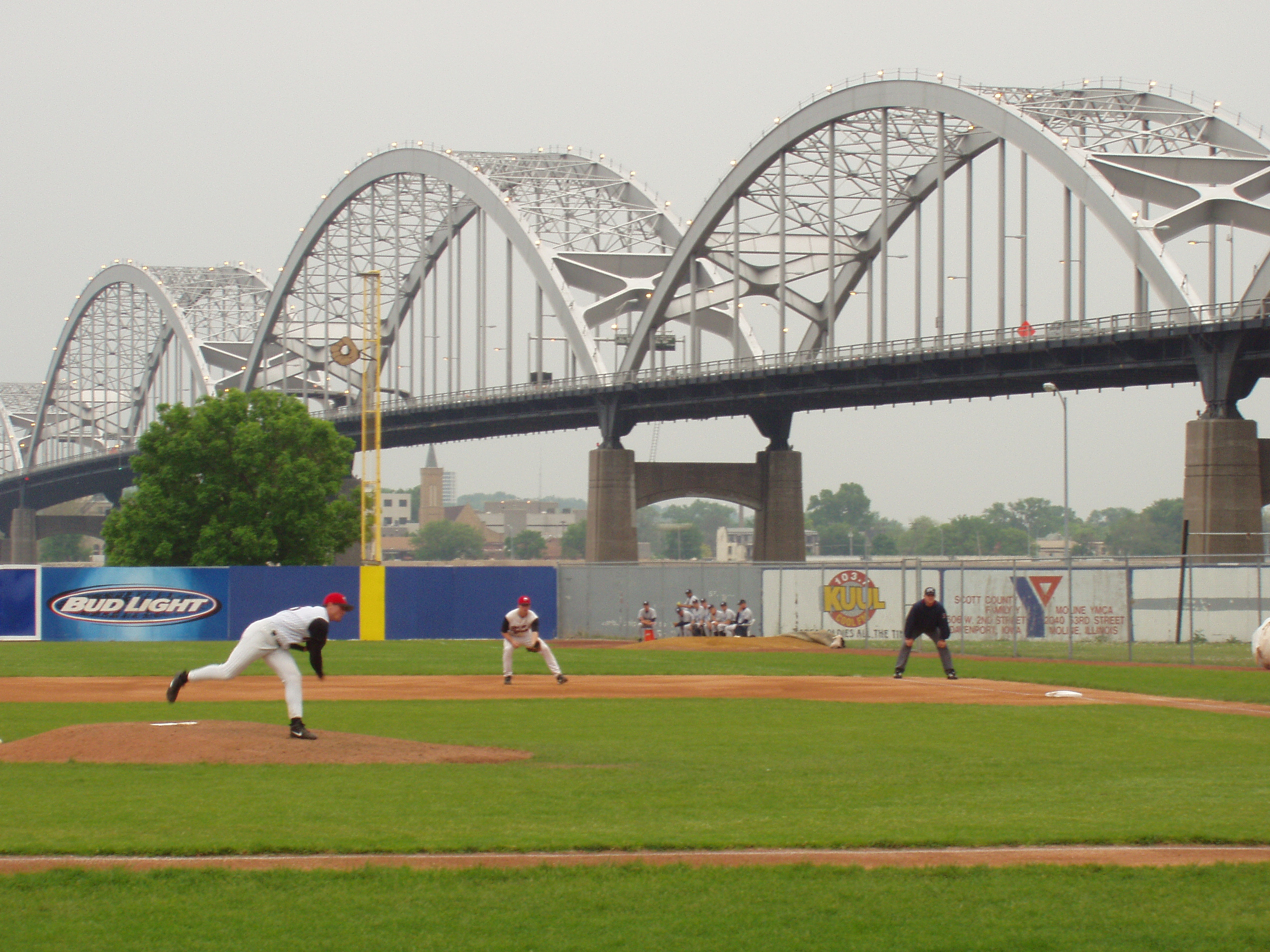
Joshua Hill, (2003)

=== Modern Woodman Park renovations ===
Sitting on the banks of the river, the stadium has survived many floods, including major Mississippi River floods of 1965, 1969, 1993 and 2001, all of which breached the facility. Pictures of the flooded stadium are plentiful in the news media. The Great Flood of 1993 was especially damaging to the facility.

Designed to combat the recurring and costly toll of flooding, a project was undertaken in 2004 to modernize and protect the facility in a joint effort of The River Bandits and the City of Davenport. The result was a massive redesign of the field and grounds at Modern Woodmen Park. The entire structure and field of the original 1931 stadium were redone. Only the exterior facade of the old stadium remained, with concessions, concourses, level loge boxes, and seating areas being reconstructed. The improvements essentially created a new ballpark within the shell of the old park. The resulting 2004 renovations included a raised playing field; a slight shift of the playing field to better face the river; removal of the drive behind the outfield fence; the addition of a berm in the outfield and the addition of exterior brick/metal columns, put in place for decoration and also to hold portable flood walls to be inserted outside the stadium. The new protections secured and protected the facility during other major Mississippi River floods in 2008, 2011 and 2013. Before the 2004 renovations, flooding created financial and logistical problems, as the team was regularly forced to move "home" games to local facilities or other MWL venues such as Clinton, Iowa, North Scott High School, Brady Street Stadium or Black Hawk College.

The ballpark has incorporated modern and creative features. Including a corn field beside left-field, from which the players are introduced. The team unveiled a $347,000 HD video board shortly before the Bandits hosted the 2011 Midwest League All-Star Game. The renamed and remodeled Modern Woodmen Park was selected the Midwest League's best ballpark by Baseball America and earned a five-star rating from BallparkDigest.com.

In 2007, stadium renaming rights went to Rock Island-based-Modern Woodmen of America for a reported $4.5 million.

Since then, Modern Woodmen Park has earned more accolades than any minor league ballpark in the country. It was voted "the best minor league ballpark in America" by the readers of USA Today and 10Best.com and the Midwest League's best ballpark by Baseball America. It also earned a 5-star rating from BallparkDigest.com, was named one of the two most beautiful ballparks in minor league baseball by USA Today, one of the top 10 in the nation by Parade Magazine, and was selected "the #2 Coolest Minor League Ballpark in America" by Complex Magazine.

Under Main Street Baseball's leadership, the River Bandits have added many fun new features to the ballpark, including a new outfield bar, a new picnic area, five concourse-level "loge boxes", an 80-foot (24 m) long HD ribbon-board, a huge new 20' x 36' tall HD videoboard, a new playground, birthday room, additional office and storage space, a new concessions stand and more than a dozen new portable food carts, a Hall of Fame autographed jersey display, an unmatched collection of bobbleheads from across the country and a sponsored corn field from which the players are introduced at the game's outset.

In 2011, the Bandits unveiled their new Budweiser Champions Club, a 2500 s.f. glass-enclosed multi-purpose banquet hall with glass garage doors that open and close depending on the weather. That room has helped increase wedding business by more than 500%, and is regularly sold out during the Christmas season. It was voted by BallparkDigest.com as "the best ballpark renovation under $1 million."

In 2014, added a 110-foot (34 m) tall Ferris Wheel to the landscape of the stadium under the direction of Director of Amusements Mike Clark, with the Ferris Wheel located behind the left-field wall. Also, a 30-foot (9.1 m) tall Drop-N-Twist, an old-fashioned carousel, three bounce houses, and several other amusement rides have been added since then. Also added in 2014 were three new themed areas, including a 1,500 s.f. deck featuring a firepit to keep fans warm during April and May, 51 new swivel-chair seats adjacent to the field, and 18 new extra-wide seats adjacent to the visitor's dugout, as well as four new padded seats set aside for veterans and active-duty military.

In 2015, the franchise continued to improve the ballpark with a 10,000 s.f. expansion of the third-base concourse.

=== Media ===
In 2004, Author Tim Rask released a book titled Baseball at Davenport's John O'Donnell Stadium. ISBN 9780738532479

== No-hitters ==
There have been 12 no-hitters, including one perfect game by franchise pitchers since the team began play in the Midwest League:

Key
| (#) | Number of innings in a game that was shorter or longer than 9 innings |
| * | Indicates a perfect game |

| Date | Pitcher | Score | Opponent |
|---|---|---|---|
| July 2, 1961 | Dennis Ribant* | 1–0 | Clinton C-Sox |
| May 6, 1966 | Vern Geishert | 7–0 | Fox Cities Foxes |
| May 4, 1971 | Sid Monge | 6–0 | Cedar Rapids Cardinals |
| August 21, 1974 | Lamar Wright | 2–0 (7) | Danville Warriors |
| May 20, 1975 | Jim Dorsey | 4–0 (7) | Clinton Pilots |
| May 31, 1976 | Don Mraz | 3–0 (7) | Wisconsin Rapids Twins |
| July 26, 1976 | Ralph Botting | 3–0 (7) | Wausau Mets |
| July 9, 1977 | T. Joel Crisler | 1–0 (7) (G2) | Wisconsin Rapids Twins |
| May 19, 2000 | Tim Sturdy | 1–0 (7) | Cedar Rapids Kernels |
| August 12, 2001 | Brian Wolfe | 2–0 | Dayton Dragons |
| May 19, 2009 | Hector Cardenas (5 IP); Kevin Thomas (2 IP) | 3–0 (7) | Beloit Snappers |
| June 18, 2021 | Zach Haake (6 IP); Dante Biasi (3 IP) | 9–0 | Wisconsin Timber Rattlers |

== Roster ==
Quad Cities River Bandits roster
| Players | Coaches/Other |
|---|---|
| Pitchers: 34 Ricson Gonzalez; 56 Kendry Chourio; 51 Jackson Cleveland; 49 Nick Conte; 52 Kamden Edge; 34 Tyson Guerrero #; 19 Josh Hansell; 30 Rob Hensey; 27 Aiden Jimenez; 17 Tanner Jones; 57 L.P. Langevin; 15 Ethan McElvain; 36 John Means #; 22 Mason Miller; 23 Jesus Oliveira; 55 Yimi Presinal; 40 Emmanuel Reyes; 12 David Shields; 18 Blake Wolters; 33 Jordan Woods; Catchers: 3 Blake Mitchell; 6 Ramon Ramirez; 19 Stone Russell; Infielders: 16 Chris Brito; 41 Jose Cerice; 9 Austin Charles; 8 Derlin Figueroa; 29 Camden Johnson; 2 Tyriq Kemp; 32 Ben North; Outfielders: 7 Asbel Gonzalez; 47 Henry Ramos; 25 Zion Rose; 1 Nolan Sailors; 4 Erick Torres | Manager: 24 Jesus Azuaje; Coaches: -- Emmanuel Burriss (hitting); 43 Derrick Lewis (pitching); 37 Luke Lowery (coach); -- Clayton Mortensen (assistant pitching); 60-day injured list: -- Bryson Dudley (full season); -- Carter Frederick; -- Chase Isbell (full season); -- Sam Ruta (military leave); 28 Trevor Werner (full season); 7-day injured list; * On Kansas City Royals 40-man roster; ~ Development list; # Rehab assignment; ∞ Reserve list; ‡ Restricted list; § Suspended list; † Temporarily inactive list; Roster updated September 8, 2026; Transactions; → More rosters: MiLB • Midwest League; → Kansas City Royals minor league players |

== Notable alumni ==
- Travis Jackson (MGR, 1960) Inducted Baseball Hall of Fame, 1983
- Joe Mauer (2002) 2001 #1 Overall Draft Pick; 2009 AL Most Valuable Player; 2024 inducted Baseball Hall of Fame
- Justin Morneau (2001) 2015 NL Batting Title; 2006 AL Most Valuable Player
- Johan Santana (1998) 2004 & 2006 AL Cy Young Award
- Vince Coleman (Coach, 2013–14) 1985 NL Rookie of the Year
- Carlos Correa (2013) 2012 #1 Overall Draft Pick; 2015 AL Rookie of the Year
- Rico Carty (1960) 1970 NL Batting Title
- Carney Lansford (1976) 1981 AL Batting Title
- Shawon Dunston (1983) 1982 #1 Overall Draft Pick
- Mark Appel (2013) 2013 #1 Overall Draft Pick
- Sandy Alomar Sr. (1961) MLB All-Star
- Garret Anderson (1991) 3x MLB All-Star
- Dante Bichette (1985) 4x MLB All-Star
- Alex Bregman (2015) 3x MLB All-Star, Gold Glove Award, Silver Slugger Award
- Clay Carroll (1961) 2x MLB All-Star; 1972 NL Saves Leader
- Matt Carpenter (2009) 2 x MLB All-Star
- Mark Clear (1976–1977) 2x MLB All-Star
- Damion Easley (1990) MLB All-Star
- Jim Edmonds (1989) 4x MLB All-Star; 8 x Gold Glove
- Chuck Finley (1986) 4x MLB All-Star; 200 MLB wins
- Freddy García (1996) 2x MLB All-Star
- Doug Griffin (1966, 1969) Gold Glove
- Carlos Guillén (1996) 3x MLB All-Star
- Josh Hader (2013) MLB All-Star, 2018 NL Reliever of the Year
- Bryan Harvey (1985) 2x MLB All-Star; 1991 AL Saves leader
- Roberto Hernández(1987–1988); MLB All-Star
- Brad Lidge (1998) 2x MLB All-Star
- Lance Lynn (2008) MLB All-Star
- Lance McCullers Jr. (2013) MLB All-Star
- Jim McGlothlin (1962); MLB All-Star (Died Age 32)
- Joe Maddon (1976) 3 x MLB Manager of the Year (2008, 2011, 2015); Manager: 2016 World Series Champion Chicago Cubs
- Carlos Martinez (2011) MLB All-Star
- Shelby Miller (2009–10) MLB All-Star
- Wade Miller (1997) MLB All-Star
- Sid Monge (1971) MLB All-Star
- Jason Motte (2006) 2012 NL Saves Leader
- Mark Mulder (2006) 2 x MLB All-Star
- Marty Pattin (1966) MLB All-Star
- Chris Perez (2006) MLB All-Star
- Jerry Remy (1973) MLB All-Star
- Rick Reuschel (1983) 3x MLB All-Star
- Trevor Rosenthal (2011) MLB All-Star
- Denard Span (2004) 2x MLB Triples leader
- Jim Spencer (1965) MLB All-Star
- George Springer (2014) MLB All-Star; 2017 World Series Most Valuable Player
- Mark Sweeney (1992) All-time MLB Leader: Pinch hit RBI
- Frank Tanana (1972) 3x MLB All-Star; 1975 AL Strikeouts Leader; 1977 AL ERA Title
- Chuck Tanner (MGR 1963–64) Manager: 1979 World Series Champion Pittsburgh Pirates
- Dickie Thon (1976) MLB All-Star
- Billy Wagner (1994) 7x MLB All-Star, Inducted Baseball Hall of Fame, 2025
- Jimy Williams (MGR, 1974) 1999 AL Manager of the Year
- Clyde Wright (1965) MLB All-Star
- Oscar Taveras (2011) Died 2014, age 22 (List of baseball players who died during their careers)
- Dick Wantz (1962) (Died, Age 25 List of baseball players who died during their careers)
- Kyle Tucker (2016) 4x MLB All-Star, 2x Silver Slugger, Gold Glove, World Series Champion

== Midwest League All-Stars ==
- Jim Tokas (1964 – First MWL All-Star Game)
- Les Mundel (1964)
- Jim Solami (1964)
- Doug Griffin (1966)
- Vern Geishert (1966)
- Paul Aldrete (1966)
- Doug Well (1967)
- Steve Kealey (1967)
- Entire Quad City Angels Team – as league Leaders (1968)
- Don Cunnigan (1969)
- Jerry Feldman (1969)
- Brian Nelson (1969)
- Mike Spellman (1970)
- Jeff Pryor (1970)
- Sam Ashford (1970)
- Sid Monge (1971)
- Terry Tuley (1971)
- Frankie George (1972)
- Ron Jackson (1972)
- Lanny Little (1973)
- Pat Cristelli (1974)
- Thad Bosley (1975)
- Willie Aikens (1975)
- Jim Dorsey (1975)
- Rich Brewster (1976)
- Rich Brewster (1977)
- Scott Moffitt (1977)
- John Harris (1977)
- Jeff Bertoni (1978)
- Craig Cornfield (1980)
- Mike Diaz (1980)
- Rick Renwick (1980)
- Carlos Gil (1980)
- Mike Kelly (1980)
- Tim Millner (1980)
- Ed Moore (1980)
- Ray Soff (1980)
- Carmelo Martinez (1980)
- Rich Deloch (1980)
- Jack Upton (1980)
- Henry Cotto (1981)
- Rusty Piggott (1981)
- Tom Smith (1981)
- Jim Gerlack (1981)
- Jeff Rutledge (1982)
- Wendell Henderson (1982)
- Darrin Jackson (1982)
- Darryl Banks (1982)
- Gary Jones (1983)
- Shawon Dunston (1983) * MVP
- Tony Woods (1983)
- John Huey (1983)

1984–1996 Not available

- Kevin Burns (1997)
- Wes Pratt(1997)
- Tucker Barr (1997)
- Farley Love (1998)
- Tom Shearn (1998)
- Aaron McNeal (1998)
- Pat Cutshall (1998)
- Leatherman (1999)
- Michael Restovich (1999)
- Jon Schaeffer (1999) * MVP
- Alvarez (1999)
- Rincon (1999)
- Rivera (1999)
- Hoard (1999)
- Tony Stevens (2000)
- Eric Sandberg (2000)
- Willie Eyre (2000)
- Kevin Frederick (2000)
- Juan Padilla (2000)
- Tim Sturdy (2000)
- Justin Morneau (2001)
- Terry Tiffee (2001)
- Luis Maza (2001)
- Henry Bonilla (2001)
- Jeff Randazzo (2001)
- Josmir Romero (2001)
- Joe Mauer (2002)
- Josh Daws (2002)
- Jason Richardson (2002)
- Seth Davidson (2003)
- Pat Neshek (2003)

2004–2005 NA

- Bryan Anderson (2006)
- Colby Rasmus (2006)
- Randy Roth (2006)
- Jaime Garcia (2006)
- Jonathan Mikrut (2006)
- Danny Borne (2006)

2007 NA

- Charlie Kingery (2008)
- Mark Diapoules (2008)

2009–present NA

== All 20th Century Team ==
In 2000, the Franchise All 20th Century Team was selected by fan vote.

- 1st Base: Don Mincher (1958)
- 2nd Base: Jerry Remy (1973)
- Shortstop: Shawon Dunston (1983)
- 3rd Base: Carney Lansford (1976)
- Catcher: Brian Harper (1978)
- OF: Harvey Kuenn (1952), Dante Bichette (1985), Chad Curtis (1990)
- Utility: Nick Etten (1933)
- Starting Pitchers: Jim Bunning (1951), Frank Tanana (1972), Chuck Finley (1986), Billy Wagner (1994)
- Closer: Saúl Rivera (1999)
- Manager: Chuck Tanner (1963–1964)

== Home attendance: 1992–present ==
- 1992 – 250,745
- 1993 – 103,797*
- 1994 – 260,471
- 1995 – 257,501
- 1996 – 209,513
- 1997 – 130,932*
- 1998 – 153,886
- 1999 – 145,734
- 2000 – 138,394
- 2001 – 129,961*
- 2002 – 117,559
- 2003 – 132,983
- 2004 – 173,364
- 2005 – 165,878
- 2006 – 146,688
- 2007 – 148,773
- 2008 – 207,048*
- 2009 – 236,401
- 2010 – 224,128
- 2011 – 223,025*
- 2012 – 240,008
- 2013 – 226,112*
- 2014 – 237,005
- 2015 – 250,004
- 2016 – 234,923
- 2017 – 230,006
- 2018 – 215,061
- 2019 – 150,905*
- 2021 – 163,263

Note: * = flooded stadium area
