= Joe Glenn =

Joe Glenn may refer to:

- Joe Glenn (American football) (born 1949), American football coach
- Joe Glenn (baseball) (1908–1985), Major League catcher
