= Moline Plowboys =

- 1892–1948; (1892, 1894, 1914–1917, 1919–1932, 1937–1941, 1947–1948); Moline, Illinois

Minor league affiliations
- Class: Class C (1947–1948); Class B (1937–1941; 1919–1923; 1914–1917); Class D (1924–1932); Class A (1894)
- League: Central Association (1947–1948); Illinois–Indiana–Iowa League (1937–1941); Mississippi Valley League (1924–1932); Illinois–Indiana–Iowa League (1914–1917, 1919–1923); Western Association (1894); Illinois-Iowa League (1892)

Major league affiliations
- Team: Philadelphia Athletics (1947–48); Chicago Cubs (1937–1940); Detroit Tigers (1932)

Minor league titles
- League titles (4): 1894; 1915; 1921; 1937

Team data
- Name: Moline A's (1947–1948); Moline Plowboys (1914–1917, 1919–1932, 1937–1941); Rock Island-Moline Islanders (1894); Rock Island-Moline Twins (1892)
- Previous parks: Browning Field (1920–1932, 1937–1941, 1947–1948); Athletic Park/Three-I Park (1914, 1917, 1919); Twin Cities Park (1892, 1894)

The Moline Plowboys was a primary name of the minor league baseball teams based in Moline, Illinois, one of the Quad Cities. Moline teams played as members the 1892 Illinois-Iowa League, 1894 Western Association, the Mississippi Valley League (1924–1932), Illinois–Indiana–Iowa League (1914–1923, 1937–1941) and Central Association (1947–1948), winning four league championships. The franchise played as the "Moline A's" in 1947–1948.

Moline was an affiliate of the Detroit Tigers (1932), Chicago Cubs (1937–1940) and Philadelphia Athletics (1947–1948).

Moline's home minor league ballpark from 1920 to 1948 was Browning Field.

Baseball Hall of Fame inductee Warren Giles was President of the Plowboys franchise from 1919 to 1922.

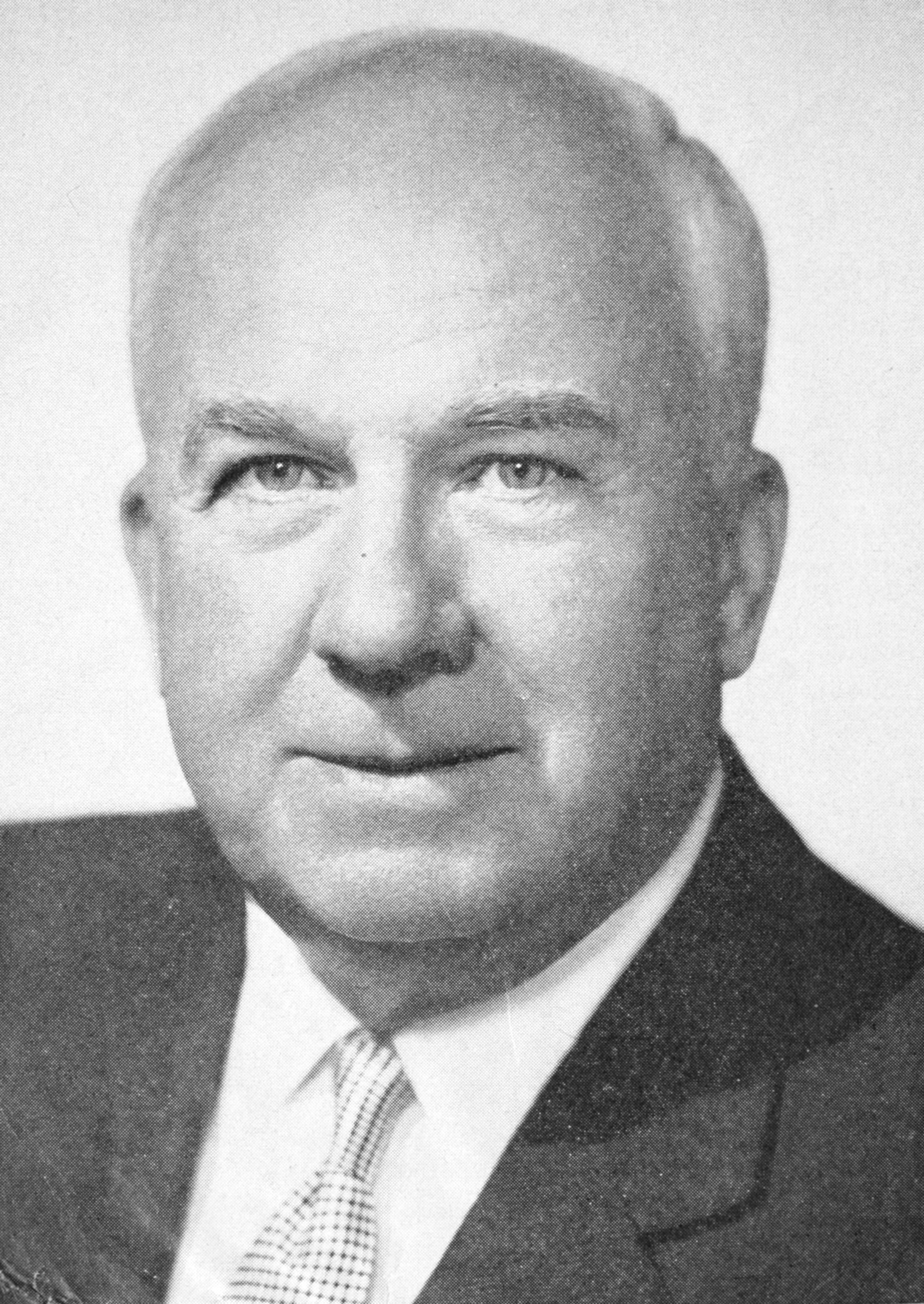
Warren Giles, National League President, 1962

== History ==
Tracing back to 1879, Quad City professional baseball includes Minor League teams in Davenport, Iowa, Moline, Illinois and Rock Island, Illinois, as well as nearby Kewanee, Illinois. The 1879 Davenport Brown Stockings played one season in the Northwestern League and the Rock Island Islanders began play in 1883. Moline began play in 1914. The Davenport team was the foundation of today's Quad City River Bandits, the surviving franchise of the three.

Moline and Rock Island partnered with two early teams. In 1892, the Rock Island-Moline Twins played in the final season of the Illinois-Iowa League. In 1894, the Rock Island-Moline Islanders played as a member of the Western Association and captured the Western Association championship with a record of 72–50.

The Quad Cities area was able to support two teams, with the Davenport Blue Sox and the Rock Island Islanders. In July 1914, a third Quad City team was added when the Danville Speakers relocated to Moline and the Moline Plowboys were established. The name "Plowboys" corresponds to Moline's local industry of plow production. Moline was home to companies such as Deere, Moline Plow Company, and Minneapolis-Moline in the era.

Baseball Hall of Fame inductee Warren Giles was team President of the Plowboys from 1919 to 1922. Giles later became president and general manager of the Cincinnati Reds (1937–1951) and president of the National League (1951–1969). From 1920 to 1922, the Plowboys were managed by Earle Mack, son of Baseball Hall of Fame owner/manager Connie Mack.

Moline won Three-I Championships in 1915, 1921 and 1937. The Plowboys were an affiliate of the Detroit Tigers in 1932 and the Chicago Cubs from 1937 to 1940.

The franchise reemerged as the Moline A's in 1947–1948, playing in the Central Association as an affiliate of the Philadelphia Athletics. Moline moved to Kewanee, Illinois, on June 18, 1948, becoming the Kewanee A's and winning the Central Association Championship in 1949, the year the league folded. Moline has not hosted another minor league baseball franchise.

== The ballparks ==
The 1892 and 1894 Rock Island-Moline teams played at Twin City Park. The ballpark was located at 5th Avenue & 43rd Street in Rock Island, Illinois.

From 1914-1919, the Plowboy teams played at Athletic Park, also nicknamed "Three-I Park". The ballpark was located at 4th Avenue and 37th Street Moline, Illinois.

The Plowboys' ballpark from 1920 to 1948 was Browning Field. The 5,600 capacity park had dimensions (LF-CF-RF) of 550-440-377. The first night game at the park was July 11, 1930. Located at 16th Street & 23rd Avenue Moline, Illinois, Browning Field and the adjacent Wharton Field House are still in use today by the athletic teams of Moline High School.

In an exhibition game on April 12, 1920 the Plowboys defeated the Chicago White Sox 7–1 in the first "major-league" game played at Browning Field. The Chicago Cubs played an exhibition at Browning Field against their affiliate Plowboys on April 14, 1938.

Babe Ruth appeared at Browning Field on June 26, 1940. 2,600 were in attendance for the Plowboys exhibition game featuring Ruth. Ruth put on a batting practice exhibition as well.

== Timeline ==
| Year(s) | # Yrs. | Team | Level | League | Affiliate | Ballpark |
|---|---|---|---|---|---|---|
| 1892 | 1 | Rock Island-Moline Twins | Independent | Illinois-Iowa League | None | Twin City Park |
| 1894 | 1 | Rock Island-Moline Islanders | Class A | Western Association | None | Twin City Park |
| 1914–1917, 1919–1923 | 9 | Moline Plowboys | Class B | Illinois–Indiana–Iowa League | None | Athletic Park |
| 1924–1931 | 8 | Moline Plowboys | Class D | Mississippi Valley League | None | Browning Field |
| 1932 | 1 | Moline Plowboys | Class D | Mississippi Valley League | Detroit Tigers | Browning Field |
| 1937–1940 | 4 | Moline Plowboys | Class B | Illinois–Indiana–Iowa League | Chicago Cubs | Browning Field |
| 1941 | 1 | Moline Plowboys | Class B | Illinois–Indiana–Iowa League | None | Browning Field |
| 1947–1948 | 2 | Moline A's | Class C | Central Association | Philadelphia Athletics | Browning Field |

== Year–by–year records ==
| Year | Record | Finish | Manager | Playoffs / notes |
|---|---|---|---|---|
| 1914 | 20–33 | 8th | Connie Walsh / William Neal | No playoffs held |
| 1915 | 75–51 | 1st | George Hughes | League champions |
| 1916 | 59–76 | 5th | George Hughes | No playoffs held |
| 1917 | 27–38 | 6th | Ned Pettigrew / Bob Tarleton | season shortened to July 8 |
| 1919 | 40–81 | 6th | George Hughes | No playoffs held |
| 1920 | 69–70 | 4th | Earle Mack | No playoffs held |
| 1921 | 78–55 | 1st | Earle Mack | League champions |
| 1922 | 49–89 | 8th | Earle Mack | No playoffs held |
| 1923 | 45–91 | 8th | Bobby Coltrin / Jim Shollenberger | No playoffs held |
| 1924 | 59–65 | 5th | Jim Shollenberger | No playoffs held |
| 1925 | 73–52 | 2nd | Jim Shollenberger | No playoffs held |
| 1926 | 71–50 | 2nd | Jim Shollenberger | No playoffs held |
| 1927 | 63–55 | 5th | Fritz Mollwitz | No playoffs held |
| 1928 | 69–54 | 2nd | Richard Manchester | No playoffs held |
| 1929 | 63–63 | 4th | Richard Manchester | No playoffs held |
| 1930 | 63–62 | 4th | Riley Parker | No playoffs held |
| 1931 | 68–58 | 3rd | Riley Parker | No playoffs held |
| 1932 | 55–66 | 6th | Ernie Lorbeer | No playoffs held |
| 1937 | 74–41 | 2nd | Mike Gazella | League champions |
| 1938 | 67–59 | 3rd | Mike Gazella | lost league finals |
| 1939 | 49–73 | 6th (t) | Mike Gazella | Did not qualify |
| 1940 | 46–78 | 7th | Mike Gazella | Did not qualify |
| 1941 | 43–82 | 8th | Joe Mowry | Did not qualify |
| 1947 | 51–74 | 6th | Elwood Wheaton / Joe Glenn | Did not qualify |
| 1948 | 17–25 | NA | Joe Glenn | Moved to Kewanee June 18 |

== Notable alumni ==
- Warren Giles (1919–1921, team president) Inducted Baseball Hall of Fame, 1979
- Elden Auker (1932)
- Bill Barrett (1921)
- Art Ditmar (1948)
- Rube Ehrhardt (1917)
- Hod Eller (1915)
- Joe Glenn (1947–1948 MGR)
- Fred Heimach (1921)
- Kirby Higbe (1937) 2x MLB All–Star
- Len Koenecke (1932) (List of baseball players who died during their careers)
- Peanuts Lowrey (1937) MLB All-Star
- Earle Mack (1920–1922, MGR)
- Lennie Merullo (1939)
- Fritz Mollwitz (1927)
- Lou Novikoff (1938)
- Claude Passeau (1932) 5x MLB All–Star
- Fred Smith (1921)
- Evar Swanson (1924)
- Mike Tresh (1932) MLB All–Star
- Dutch Ulrich (1922)
- Jake Wade (1932)
- Eddie Waitkus (1939) 2x MLB All–Star
- Bob Weiland (1928)
- Hank Wyse (1940) MLB All–Star
- Moline A's players
- Moline Plowboys players

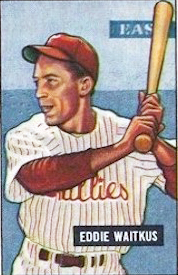
Eddie Waitkus
