= Commonwealth Charter Academy =

Coordinates: 40.29238°N 76.88327°W

Location
- 1 Innovation Way; Harrisburg, Pennsylvania 17110; United States

Information
- School type: Public charter cyber school
- Founded: August 11, 2003
- Faculty: 1170 teachers (2024)
- Teaching staff: 1170
- Grades: K–12 (2013)
- Enrollment: 20,355 pupils (2024)
- Language: English
- Website: https://ccaeducate.me/

Commonwealth Charter Academy (previously named Commonwealth Connections Academy) is a large, public, cyber charter school. The school serves all school-aged children in the Commonwealth of Pennsylvania regardless of where the child lives. The Academy's headquarters is located in Harrisburg, Pennsylvania.

== History ==
When the School was originally approved it served Kindergarten through 8th grade pupils all across Pennsylvania.

As of 2013, it was one of sixteen public cyber charters schools operating in the Commonwealth of Pennsylvania.

As of 2016, the School operated seven additional branches, called Family Service Centers, across the Commonwealth: Andreas, Allentown, Harrisburg, Center City, Philadelphia, Pittsburgh, Cranberry Township, Dickson City, and Williamsport.

In 2016-17, there were 9,200 students enrolled. By 2023, enrollment was 22,000 pupils in grades kindergarten through 12th, making it the largest public school in the United States by enrollment. The Capital Area Intermediate Unit IU15 provides the school with a wide variety of services like special education for disabled students and hearing, speech and visual disability services and professional development for staff and faculty.

== Spending ==
In 2015-16, the school spent $3.2 million and in 2016-17 $4.4 million in taxpayer dollars on advertising, the most of all of Pennsylvania’s cyber charter schools, through sponsorships, ads in print, TV, radio, Internet and outdoor marketing.

In 2025, it was reported that Commonwealth Charter Academy spent hundreds of thousands of dollars on cars, dining, and entertainment, with little transparency. Commonwealth Charter Academy responded to this report in a letter to the Pennsylvania General Assembly calling out several discrepancies.
