= Mike Gazella =

American baseball player (1895–1978)

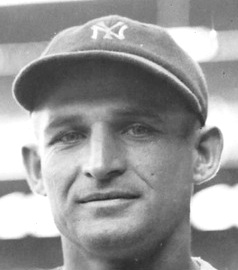
- Gazella, circa 1928
- Infielder
- Born: October 13, 1895; Olyphant, Pennsylvania, U.S.
- Died: September 11, 1978 (aged 82); Odessa, Texas, U.S.
- Batted: Right Threw: Right

MLB debut
- July 2, 1923, for the New York Yankees

Last MLB appearance
- September 30, 1928, for the New York Yankees

MLB statistics
- Batting average: .241
- Hits: 85
- Runs batted in: 32
- Stats at Baseball Reference

Teams
- New York Yankees (1923, 1926–1928)

Career highlights and awards
- 3× World Series champion (1923, 1927, 1928)

Michael Gazella (October 13, 1895 – September 11, 1978) was an American Major League Baseball player who played for the New York Yankees on several championship teams in the 1920s.

Born in Olyphant, Pennsylvania, Gazella played football as well as baseball at Lafayette College and Mansfield University of Pennsylvania. In 1923, he was signed by New York and played in eight games for the Yankees that season. Consigned to the minor leagues in 1924 and 1925, he played for teams in Minneapolis and Atlanta before rejoining New York in the 1926 season as a utility infielder, usually playing third base.

The Yankees played in the World Series every year Gazella was on the team, winning three. However, Gazella played in only the 1926 Series, in which the Yankees lost to the St. Louis Cardinals.

After retiring, Gazella managed the Ponca City Angels of the Western Association and the Moline Plowboys of the Three-I League, as well as scouted for the Yankees.

Gazella died in an automobile accident in Odessa, Texas on September 11, 1978.
