= Throop, Pennsylvania =

Borough in Pennsylvania, US

- Borough
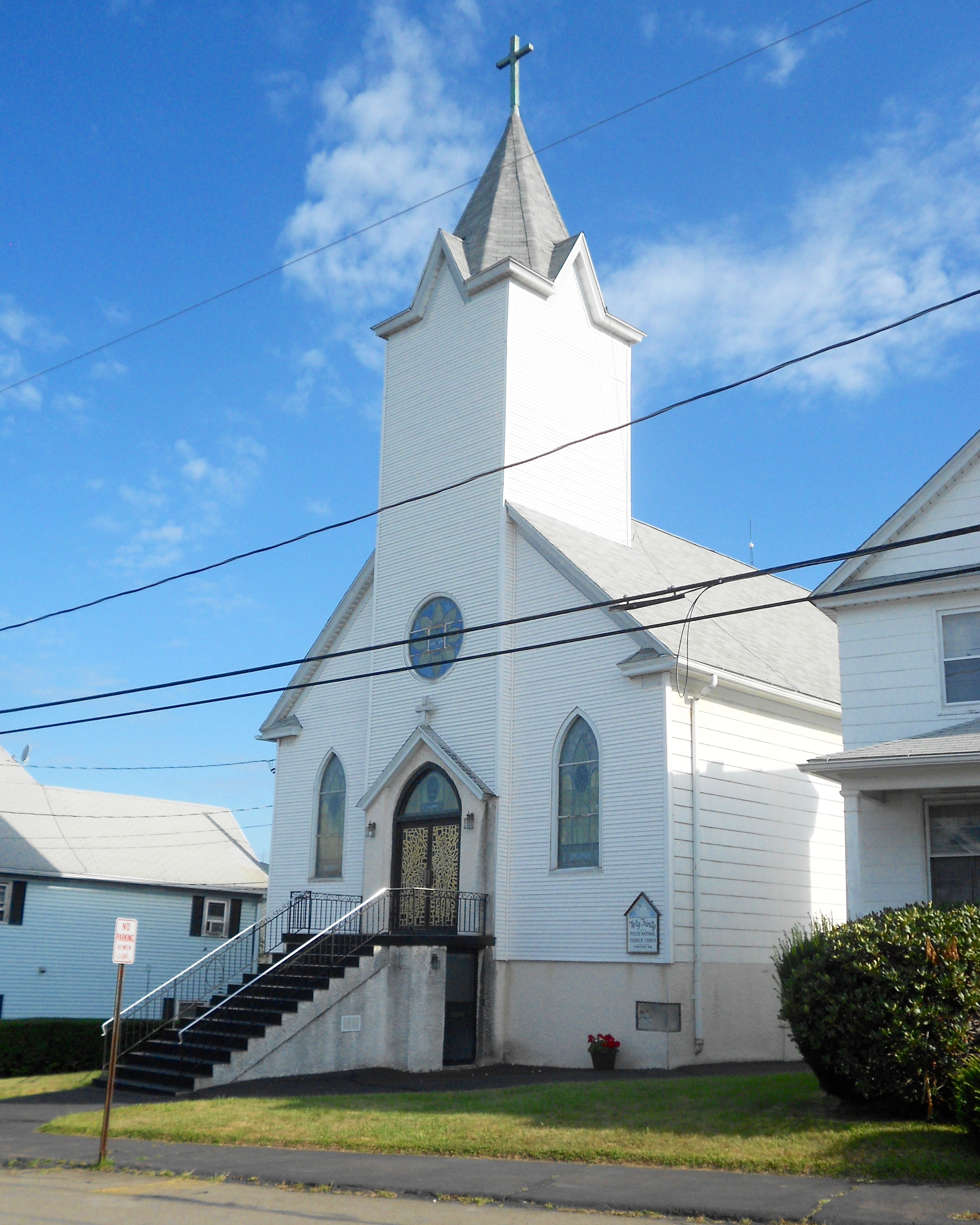
- Holy Trinity Polish National Catholic Church
- Motto: "A Great Place to Live!"
- Location of Throop in Lackawanna County, Pennsylvania

- Location in Pennsylvania Location in the United States
- Coordinates: 41°26′44″N 75°36′52″W
- Country: United States
- State: Pennsylvania
- County: Lackawanna

Government
  - Mayor: Joe Tropiak (D)

Area
  - Total: 4.97 sq mi (12.87 km^{2})
  - Land: 4.97 sq mi (12.87 km^{2})
  - Water: 0 sq mi (0.00 km^{2})
- Elevation: 846 ft (258 m)

Population (2020)
  - Total: 4,078 ▼
  - Estimate (2021): 4,081
  - Density: 784.2/sq mi (302.79/km^{2})
- Time zone: UTC-5 (EST)
  - Summer (DST): UTC-4 (EDT)
- Zip Code: 18512
- Area code: 570
- FIPS code: 42-76648
- Website: www.throopboro.com

Throop (/ˈtruːp/ TROOP) is a borough in Lackawanna County, Pennsylvania, United States, adjoining Scranton. Formerly, coal mining and silk manufacturing provided employment for the people of Throop, who numbered 2,204 in 1900 and 5,133 in 1910. In 1940, 7,382 people lived in Throop. The population was 4,078 at the 2020 census.

== Geography ==
Throop is located at 41°26′44″N 75°36′52″W (41.445536, -75.614494).

According to the United States Census Bureau, the borough has a total area of 5.0 square miles (13 km^{2}), all land. It is bordered to the northeast by Olyphant, to the north by Blakely, to the northwest by Dickson City, to the west by Scranton, and to the south by Dunmore.

== History and notable features ==
On April 7, 1911, a fire at the Price-Pancoast Colliery killed 72 coal miners in what has been described as "the most appalling mine disaster in the history of the northern anthracite coal fields."

The borough contains a lead-contaminated parcel of land commonly known as the Marjol Battery site. Now owned by Gould Electronics, the empty land was a former battery processing facility closed in April 1982. Since the late 1980s, the federal United States Environmental Protection Agency and the state DEP have worked to clean up contamination in adjacent areas, but a final remedy for the site itself has remained on hold in recent years, as local officials and citizens fight with the government agencies and Gould over the best solution. In the meantime, the landowner has maintained a policy of basic containment and monitoring.

Throop's most popular summertime event is its annual Cow Flop, organized by the Throop Booster Club. It has been a tradition in Throop since the late 1980s. The Flop serves as a fundraiser for the club and usually raises about $10,000 annually to benefit youth baseball and softball programs in the borough. The Flop, formerly held on a Sunday in late June, is now a two-day (since 2007) event that features a parade, fireworks, music, food, and other entertainment. The event requires more than 100 volunteers, mostly members of the Booster Club and parents of Throop athletes, to produce. The main event of the Cow Flop is the raffle involving 2,000 squares and a cow's pick as to where she will relieve herself. Raffle tickets are $10 and the winner of the annual Flop raffle wins $5,000.

== Demographics ==
Historical population
Census	Pop.	Note	%±
1900	2,204		—
1910	5,133		132.9%
1920	6,672		30.0%
1930	8,027		20.3%
1940	7,382		−8.0%
1950	5,861		−20.6%
1960	4,732		−19.3%
1970	4,307		−9.0%
1980	4,166		−3.3%
1990	4,070		−2.3%
2000	4,010		−1.5%
2010	4,088		1.9%
2020	4,065		−0.6%
2021 (est.)	4,081	▲	0.4%

=== 2020 census ===
As of the 2020 census, Throop had a population of 4,065. The median age was 43.3 years. 19.5% of residents were under the age of 18 and 20.7% of residents were 65 years of age or older. For every 100 females there were 98.0 males, and for every 100 females age 18 and over there were 93.2 males age 18 and over.

99.9% of residents lived in urban areas, while 0.1% lived in rural areas.

There were 1,787 households in Throop, of which 26.0% had children under the age of 18 living in them. Of all households, 41.1% were married-couple households, 21.3% were households with a male householder and no spouse or partner present, and 29.9% were households with a female householder and no spouse or partner present. About 32.9% of all households were made up of individuals and 14.5% had someone living alone who was 65 years of age or older.

There were 1,942 housing units, of which 8.0% were vacant. The homeowner vacancy rate was 1.4% and the rental vacancy rate was 6.5%.

Racial composition as of the 2020 census
Race	Number	Percent
White	3,689	90.8%
Black or African American	46	1.1%
American Indian and Alaska Native	2	0.0%
Asian	47	1.2%
Native Hawaiian and Other Pacific Islander	0	0.0%
Some other race	53	1.3%
Two or more races	228	5.6%
Hispanic or Latino (of any race)	141	3.5%

=== 2010 census ===
As of the census of 2010, there were 4,088 people, 1,778 households, and 1,122 families residing in the borough. The population density was 817.6 inhabitants per square mile (315.7/km^{2}). There were 1,937 housing units at an average density of 387.4 per square mile (149.6/km^{2}). The racial makeup of the borough was 96% White, 1.2% African American, 0.2% American Indian, 0.6% Asian, 0.7% from other races, and 1.2% from two or more races. Hispanic or Latino of any race were 2% of the population.

There were 1,778 households, out of which 23.5% had children under the age of 18 living with them, 43.5% were married couples living together, 13.5% had a female householder with no husband present, and 36.9% were non-families. 31.8% of all households were made up of individuals, and 12.2% had someone living alone who was 65 years of age or older. The average household size was 2.30 and the average family size was 2.89.

In the borough the population was spread out, with 19.2% under the age of 18, 63.2% from 18 to 64, and 17.6% who were 65 years of age or older. The median age was 42.4 years.

=== Income and poverty ===
The median income for a household in the borough was $34,389, and the median income for a family was $38,929. Males had a median income of $30,254 versus $21,275 for females. The per capita income for the borough was $16,998. About 7.9% of families and 10.5% of the population were below the poverty line, including 22.1% of those under age 18 and 7.5% of those age 65 or over.

== Economy ==
In 1987, the Keystone Sanitary Landfill in Dunmore, the largest landfill in the state of Pennsylvania, reached capacity and was extended to Throop.

== Education ==
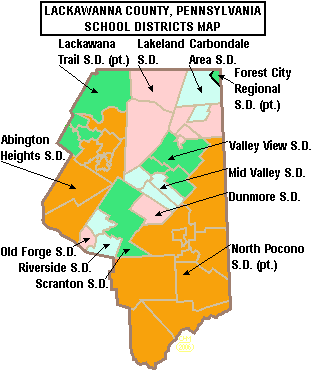
Map of Lackawanna County, Pennsylvania public school districts showing Mid Valley SD in light blue

It is in the Mid Valley School District.

While the anthracite coal industry was thriving, there were numerous neighborhood schools: the Columbus School at the corner of Dunmore Street and South Valley Avenue, the Jefferson School on Charles Street, the Lincoln School on Center Street; the Pershing School at the corner of Dunmore Street and Meade Street, the Washington School on Bellman Street, and the Wilson School on Boulevard Avenue. Throop High School was at the corner of Sanderson Street and Charles Street. As the population declined, the most of neighborhood schools were closed. The Washington School was the last to remain opened. The Wilson School became St. Anthony's School. St. Anthony's School was closed in the mid-1970s.

In 1969, the Olyphant, Dickson City, and Throop school districts consolidated to form the Mid Valley School District. Throop High School became Throop Elementary School. Currently, the district's two schools, Mid Valley Secondary Center and Mid Valley Elementary Center, are in Throop.

== Roads ==
In the Throop area, Interstate 81 is the main highway. Interstate 84, Interstate 380, and U.S. Route 6 meet I-81 at the Throop Dunmore Interchange in Dunmore near Throop. State Route 347 is another major highway in Throop.
