= Mid Valley School District =

School district in Lackawanna County, Pennsylvania, USA

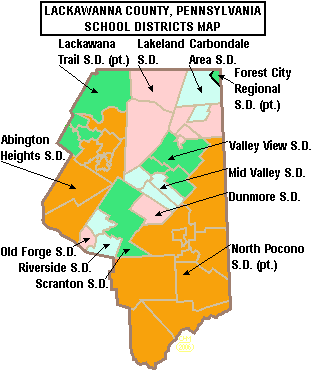

Address
- 52 Underwood Road Throop, Lackawanna County, Pennsylvania, PA, 18512-1196; United States of America

District information
- Type: Public
- Grades: K-12
- Established: 1969
- President: Steven Vituszynski
- Vice-president: Anthony Barrett
- Superintendent: Patrick Sheehan
- Business administrator: Rich Walsh
- Director of education: Brian Kelly
- Budget: $22,271,000
- NCES District ID: 4215170
- District ID: PA-119355503

Students and staff
- Students: 1,940
- Teachers: 120
- Athletic conference: PIAA District II
- Colors: Blue and White

Other information
- Mascot: Spartans
- Slogan: We Are MV
- Website: http://www.mvsd.us

The Mid Valley School District is a suburban school district located in Lackawanna County, Pennsylvania serving students in the boroughs of Olyphant, Dickson City, and Throop. As of the 2023-24 school year, 1,940 students are enrolled in Kindergarten through 12th grade. The district operates two schools: Mid Valley Elementary Center (grades Pre-K to 6) and Mid Valley Secondary Center (grades 7–12).The district is one of 12 public school districts in Lackawanna County and one of the 500 public school districts of Pennsylvania.

== History ==
Prior to 1969 each borough within the district had operated its own schools. The Pennsylvania legislature enacted the school district Reorganization Act of 1961, the school district Reorganization Act of 1963, and the school district Reorganization Act of 1968. Due to dwindling populations because of the decline of anthracite mining in the region, in accordance with this legislation, the schools of the boroughs combined to form the Mid Valley School District for the 1969–1970 school year. The name picked for the district "Mid Valley" comes from the fact that the three towns are considered to be in the middle of the Lackawanna Valley and the area of the three towns (along with Blakely, Jessup, sometimes Archbald) are often referred to as the Mid Valley Region.

For the 1969–70 school year and throughout most of the 1970s, the district population utilized the former Olyphant Junior High School as the Mid-Valley Senior High School for students in grades 10 through 12, and the former Dickson City Junior High School as the Mid-Valley Junior High School for students in grades 7 through 9. There was an elementary school for students in kindergarten through sixth grade in each borough. Soon afterward sixth grade students from Throop began to attend classes in Olyphant. Problems ranging from lack of heat in the winter months, and structural problems plagued the new district throughout much of the first decade.

In the spring of 1977, while plans for a new junior-senior high school for grades 7–12 on Franko Street in Throop were on hold, the Olyphant Elementary School and the Dickson City Elementary School were condemned by the Pennsylvania Department of Labor and Industry because of violations of the Fire and Panic Law. The displaced elementary school students then attended classes on a full-time basis in the junior high school. The junior high school students and the senior high school students used the senior high school building on split sessions. Soon afterward the Dickson City Elementary School (former Dickson City High School) was destroyed by fire. For the 1978–79 school year, district rented the former St. Patrick's School in Olyphant and used it for seventh and eighth grade students. The secondary students were no longer attending classes on split sessions. The district operated in that mode until the opening of the new Mid Valley Secondary Center on Underwood Road in Throop in the fall of 1981.

=== 1981-1989 ===
In September 1981, the new high school building was finally opened at its present location at 52 Underwood Road in Throop. The new building housed grades 6 – 12 and was named Mid Valley Secondary Center. With the opening of the new building, Mid Valley Intermediate Center (grades 4 – 6) moved into the building formerly occupied by the senior high school in Olyphant and grades K-3 were Mid Valley Primary Center, housed in the remaining school building in Dickson City.

The land chosen for the new district building was, at the time a rather remote section of Throop which was mostly wooded which allowed for expansion as a large parcel of land was bought by the district. Spartan Stadium, the track and football field, as well as an open sports field and baseball/softball fields were set up at the opposite end of the property from the new building, which was adjacent to Underwood Road. A field house was recently added to the sports complex.

Plans were made to build another building to house both the primary and intermediate students on the district land adjacent to the Secondary Center. The new building was opened for the start of the 1989–1990 school year for students in grades K-6.

=== 1989 to present ===
Due to increases in student population from recent housing developments, the elementary school building was expanded in the early 2010s. Mid Valley Secondary Center was expanded in the early 2000s, adding a small section with a 2nd gym for middle school aged children.

== Schools ==
Mid Valley School District operates two schools: Mid Valley Elementary Center (grades Pre-K to 6) and Mid Valley Secondary Center (grades 7–12). High school aged students may choose to attend the Career Technology Center of Lackawanna County for vocational training.

The Northeastern Educational Intermediate Unit IU19 provides the district with a wide variety of services like specialized education for disabled students and hearing, speech and visual disability services, and professional development for staff and faculty.

== Demographics ==
The demographics of the Mid Valley School District can be found at the National Center for Education Statistics District Demographic Dashboard 2018–22. The Mid Valley School District encompasses approximately 15 square miles (39 km^{2}). According to 2020 federal census data, it serves a resident population of 15,460.
