= Olyphant, Pennsylvania =

Borough in Pennsylvania, US

- Borough
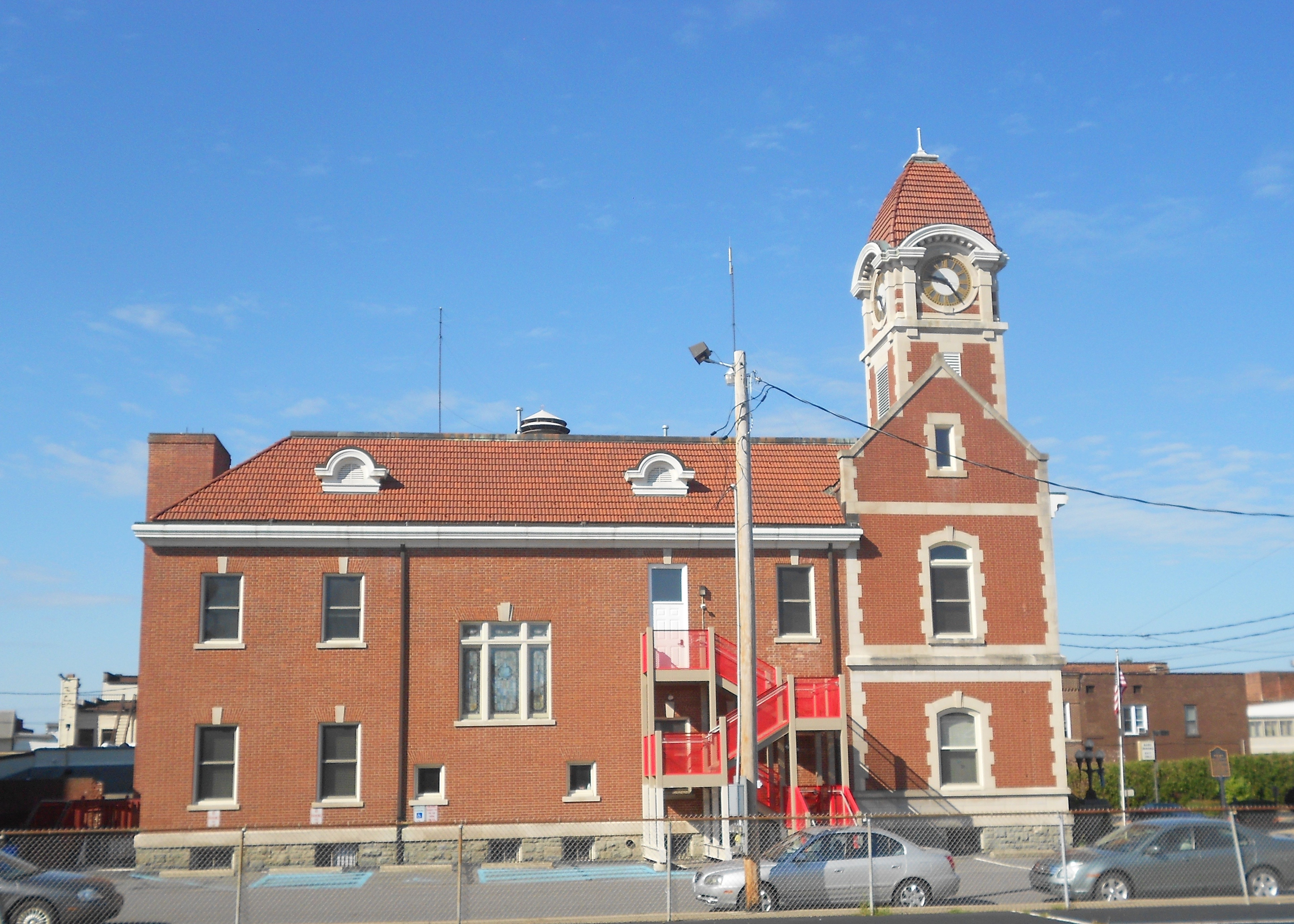
- Borough hall

- Location of Olyphant in Lackawanna County, Pennsylvania

- Location in Pennsylvania Location in the United States
- Coordinates: 41°27′45″N 75°35′44″W
- Country: United States
- State: Pennsylvania
- County: Lackawanna

Government
  - Mayor: John Sedlak Jr.
  - Council members: James Baldan; Jerry Tully; Michael Abda; Dina Harrington; Robert Hudak; David Krukovitz; Elizabeth Frushon

Area
  - Total: 5.50 sq mi (14.25 km^{2})
  - Land: 5.44 sq mi (14.08 km^{2})
  - Water: 0.066 sq mi (0.17 km^{2})
- Elevation: 843 ft (257 m)

Population (2020)
  - Total: 5,383
  - Density: 990.1/sq mi (382.27/km^{2})
- Time zone: UTC-5 (EST)
  - Summer (DST): UTC-4 (EDT)
- ZIP code: 18447-18448
- Area code: 570
- FIPS code: 42-56792
- Website: olyphantborough.com

Olyphant is a borough in Lackawanna County, Pennsylvania, United States. It is six miles (10 km) northeast of downtown Scranton, on the Lackawanna River in the heart of the anthracite region of the state. Its main source of employment was the mining and shipping of coal. It was the headquarters of the Lackawanna Coal Company. Other industries of the past were the manufacturing of blasting powder, iron and steel goods, cigars, and silks. Olyphant experienced a severe downturn in the 1950s. There was once a thriving garment industry with numerous dress factories in the downtown area. There was also a slaughterhouse. Until 2018, the biggest industry was Cinram the manufacture of compact discs (CD) and digital video discs (DVD). The population was 5,395 at the 2020 census.

== Geography ==
Olyphant is located at 41°27′45″N 75°35′44″W (41.462630, -75.595617).

According to the United States Census Bureau, the borough has a total area of 5.5 square miles (14 km^{2}), of which 5.4 square miles (14 km^{2}) is land and 0.1 square miles (0.26 km^{2}) (1.82%) is water.

== Demographics ==
Historical population
| Census | Pop. | Note | %± |
|---|---|---|---|
| 1870 | 2,327 | | — |
| 1880 | 2,094 | | −10.0% |
| 1890 | 4,083 | | 95.0% |
| 1900 | 6,180 | | 51.4% |
| 1910 | 8,505 | | 37.6% |
| 1920 | 10,236 | | 20.4% |
| 1930 | 10,743 | | 5.0% |
| 1940 | 9,252 | | −13.9% |
| 1950 | 7,047 | | −23.8% |
| 1960 | 5,864 | | −16.8% |
| 1970 | 5,422 | | −7.5% |
| 1980 | 5,204 | | −4.0% |
| 1990 | 5,222 | | 0.3% |
| 2000 | 4,978 | | −4.7% |
| 2010 | 5,151 | | 3.5% |
| 2020 | 5,383 | | 4.5% |
| 2024 (est.) | 5,380 | ▼ | −0.1% |

As of the census of 2010, there were 5,151 people, 2,324 households, and 1,357 families residing in the borough. The population density was 953.9 inhabitants per square mile (368.3/km^{2}). There were 2,521 housing units at an average density of 466.9/sq mi (180.3/km^{2}). The racial makeup of the borough was 96.2% White, 1.6% African American, 0.1% Native American, 0.3% Asian, 0.7% from other races, and 1.1% from two or more races. Hispanic or Latino of any race were 3.4% of the population.

There were 2,324 households, out of which 23.8% had children under the age of 18 living with them, 41.9% were married couples living together, 11.6% had a female householder with no husband present, and 41.6% were non-families. 36.1% of all households were made up of individuals, and 17.2% had someone living alone who was 65 years of age or older. The average household size was 2.22 and the average family size was 2.90.

In the borough, the population was spread out, with 19.3% under the age of 18, 63.7% from 18 to 64, and 17% who were 65 years of age or older. The median age was 42.6 years.

The median income for a household in the borough was $32,721, and the median income for a family was $45,091. Males had a median income of $30,647 versus $24,825 for females. The per capita income for the borough was $17,049. About 7.4% of families and 11.3% of the population were below the poverty line, including 10.2% of those under age 18 and 24.2% of those age 65 or over.

== Education ==
It is in the Mid Valley School District.

While the anthracite coal industry was thriving, there were numerous neighborhood schools: the Columbus School in the Smoketown section, the Washington School and the Roosevelt School in the Fern Hill section, the Lincoln School in the Grassy Island Heights section, as well as a three-room school in the Underwood Village and a one-room school in Marshwood. There was a Central School for elementary school students who lived downtown and in the Flats section. The annex of the Central School was Olyphant Senior High School. Olyphant Junior High School was in a separate building.

As the population declined, the neighborhood schools were closed and demolished. In 1969, the Olyphant, Dickson City, and Throop school districts consolidated to form the Mid Valley School District. The Olyphant Junior High School became the Mid-Valley Senior High School. The annex of the Olyphant Elementary School had elementary school grades as well as some overflow classes from the senior high school. On February 10, 1977, the Pennsylvania Department of Labor and Industry condemned the Olyphant Elementary School and the annex. The displaced elementary school students were moved to the Mid-Valley Junior High School in Dickson City. The displaced junior high school students and the senior high school students attended classes in the senior high school on split sessions. Eventually, new schools were built. Currently, the Mid-Valley School District has a single elementary school, and a single secondary school on Underwood Road in Throop.

Up until the mid-1970s, each Catholic parish (of the Roman Catholic Diocese of Scranton) had a parochial school: St. Patrick's, St. Michael's, and Holy Ghost. Saints Cyril and Methodius Ukrainian Catholic School remained open longer, but it was eventually closed.

There are private Catholic schools in neighboring municipalities. The La Salle Academy Primary Campus in Dickson City is for students in Pre-Kindergarten through Grade 3; the Main Campus in Jessup is for students in Grades 4 through 8. High school students can attend Bishop O'Hara High School in Dunmore and Scranton Preparatory School in Scranton.

== Notable people ==
- Nestor Chylak, Hall of Famer American League umpire
- Patricia Crowley, actress, star of numerous films and the television series Please Don't Eat the Daisies
- Mike Gazella, former Baseball player and member of the New York Yankees first World Series title in 1923.
- Joe Kotys, Olympic gymnast
- Loretta Perfectus Walsh, the first woman to enlist in the U.S. Navy, and the first woman allowed to serve as a woman in any of the United States armed forces
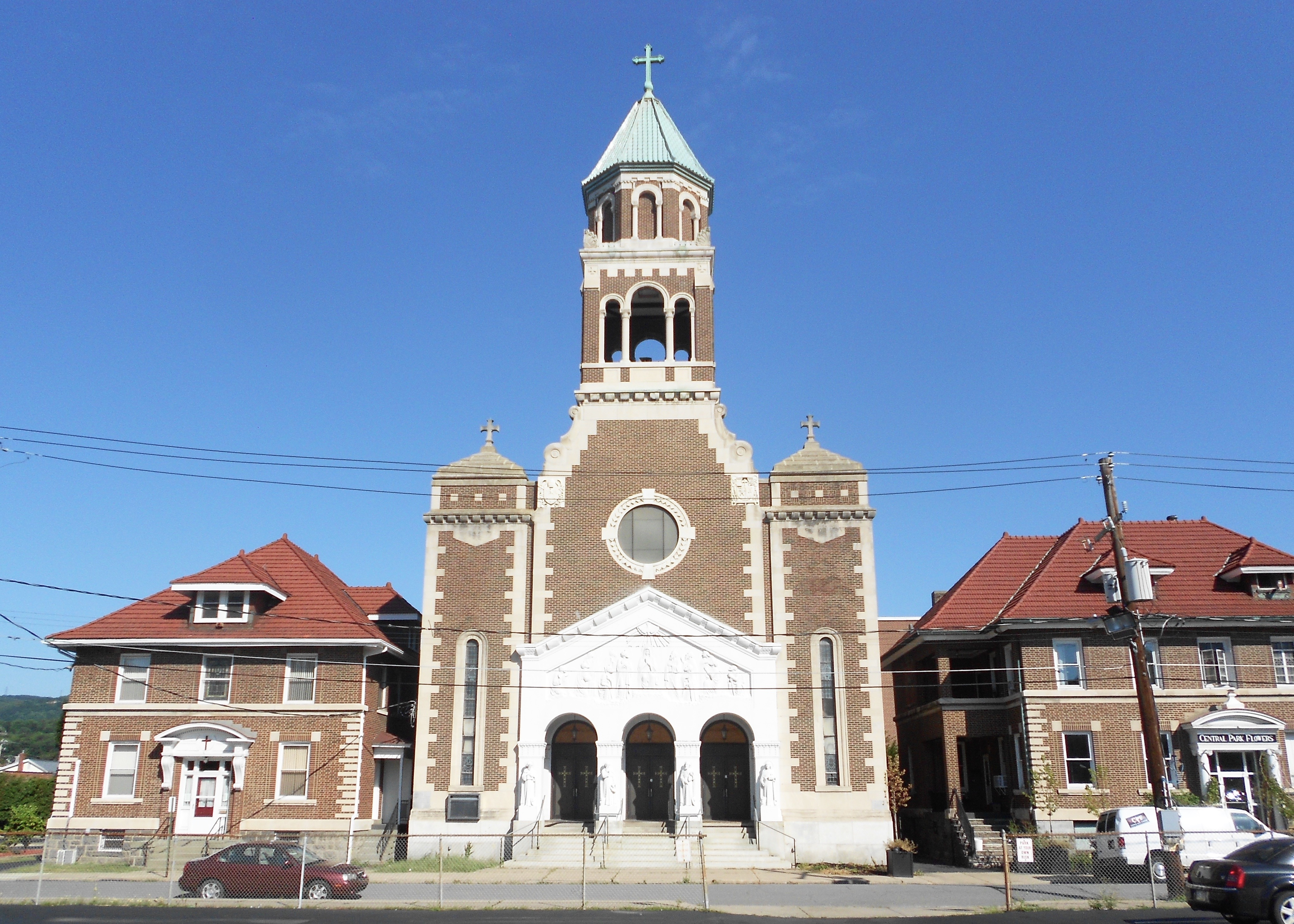
Holy Ghost Catholic church on Willow Street

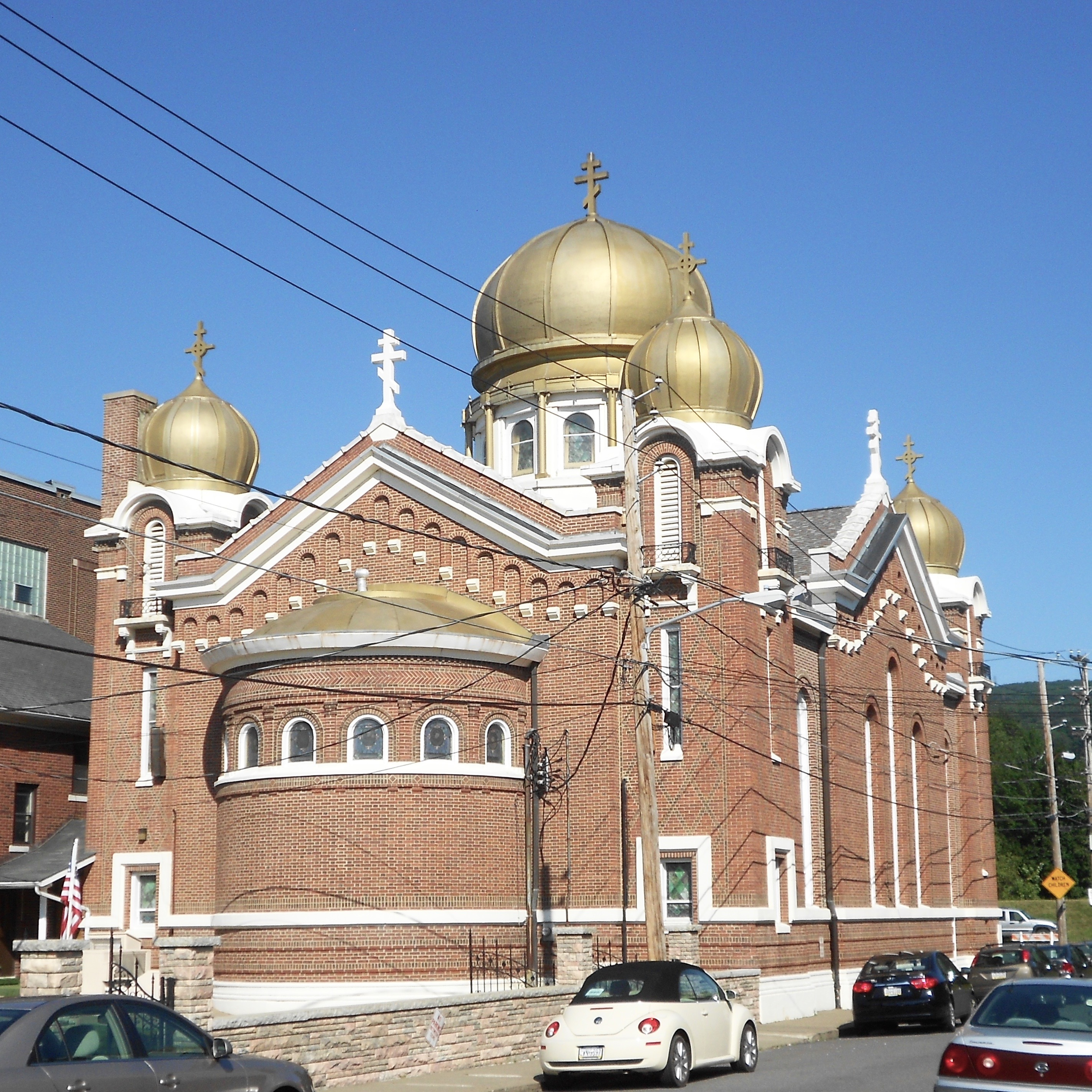
Saints Cyril & Methodius Ukrainian Greek Catholic Church

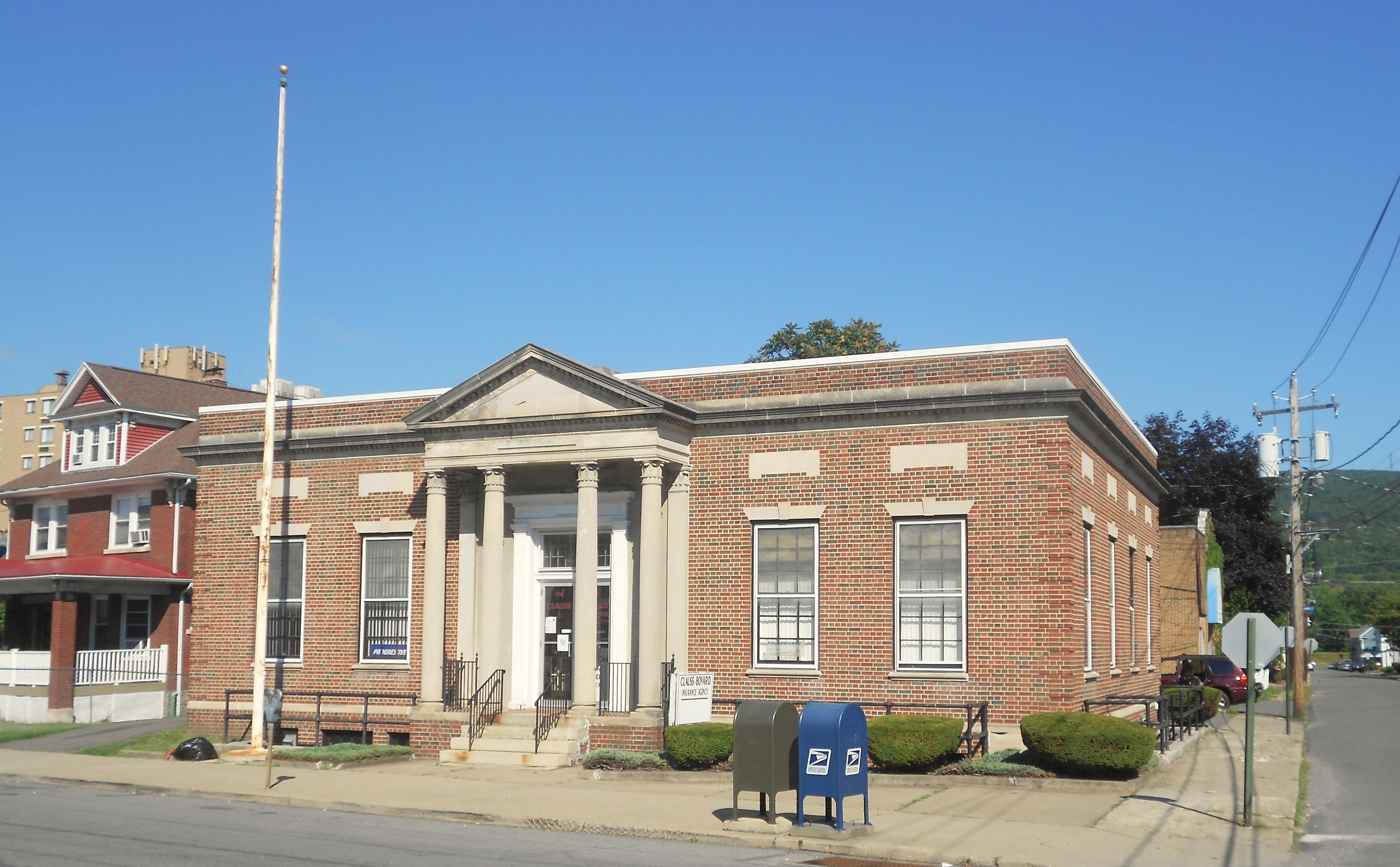
Former post office
