= Kewanee A's =

- 1948–1949; Kewanee, Illinois

Minor league affiliations
- Class: Class C (1948–1949)
- League: Central Association (1948–1949)

Major league affiliations
- Team: Philadelphia Athletics (1948–1949)

Minor league titles
- League titles (1): 1949
- Wild card berths (1): 1949

Team data
- Name: Kewanee A's (1948–1949)
- Ballpark: Northeast Park (1948–1949)

The Kewanee A's were a minor league baseball team based in Kewanee, Illinois in the 1948 and 1949 seasons after the nearby Moline A's relocated to Kewanee. The A's played as exclusively as members of the Central Association, winning the 1949 league championship. The Kewanee A's were a minor league affiliate of the Philadelphia Athletics.

The Kewanee A's hosted home minor league games at Northeast Park, which is still in use today.

The A's were preceded in Kewanee by the Kewanee Boilermakers, who played from 1908 to 1913.

== History ==
Minor league baseball began in Kewanee, Illinois in 1908, when the Kewanee Boilermakers became charter members of the Class D level Central Association, playing in the league through 1913.

After folding in 1913, minor league baseball returned to Kewanee in 1948. On June 18, 1948, the Moline A's of the Central Association moved from Moline, Illinois to Kewanee and became the "Kewanee A's". The team was an affiliate of the Philadelphia Athletics. Playing under manager Joe Glenn, the Moline/Kewanee A's finished with an overall record of 53–74 (36–49 in Kewanee), ending the season sixth place in the 1948 Central Association standings. Moline had been a founding member when the Central Association reformed as a six–team league in 1947, along with the Burlington Indians, Clinton Cubs, Hannibal Pilots, Keokuk Pirates and Rockford Rox.

In their final season, Kewanee captured the 1949 Central Association championship. The 1949 Kewanee A's finished with a regular season record of 68–60, placing third in the Central Association standings, finishing 12.5 games behind the first place Burlington Indians, to qualify for the playoffs. Kewanee had season attendance of 29,482, playing home games at Northeast Park. Kewanee's John Miller led the Central Association with 158 total hits.

In the first round of the 1949 playoffs, playing under the manager Harold Hoffman, Kewanee defeated the Keokuk Pirates three games to none to advance. In the Central Association Finals, Kewanee defeated the Cedar Rapids Rockets four games to two and captured the 1949 Central Association championship. It was the last game played in the league.

The Central Association folded permanently after the 1949 season. Of the six Central Association teams, only Cedar Rapids fielded a team in 1950. Kewanee has not hosted another minor league team.

== The ballpark ==
The 1948 and 1949 Kewanee A's played minor league home games at Northeast Park. The ballpark had a capacity of 2,500 in 1948 and 4,000 in 1949. Today, Northeast Park is still in use as a public park. The location is 1200 North Main Street, Kewanee, Illinois.

== Timeline ==
Year(s)	# Yrs.	Team	Level	League	Affiliate	Ballpark
1948–1949	2	Kewanee A's	Class C	Central Association	Philadelphia Athletics	Northeast Park

== Year–by–year records ==
Year	Record	Finish	Manager	Playoffs/Notes
1948	53–74	6th	Joe Glenn	Moline (17–25) moved to Kewanee June 18; Did not qualify
1949	68–60	3rd	Harold Hoffman	League champions

== Notable alumni ==
- Art Ditmar (1948)
- Joe Glenn (1948, MGR)
- Billy Shantz (1948)

== See also ==
- Kewanee A's players
