= Dickson City, Pennsylvania =

Borough in Pennsylvania, US

- Borough
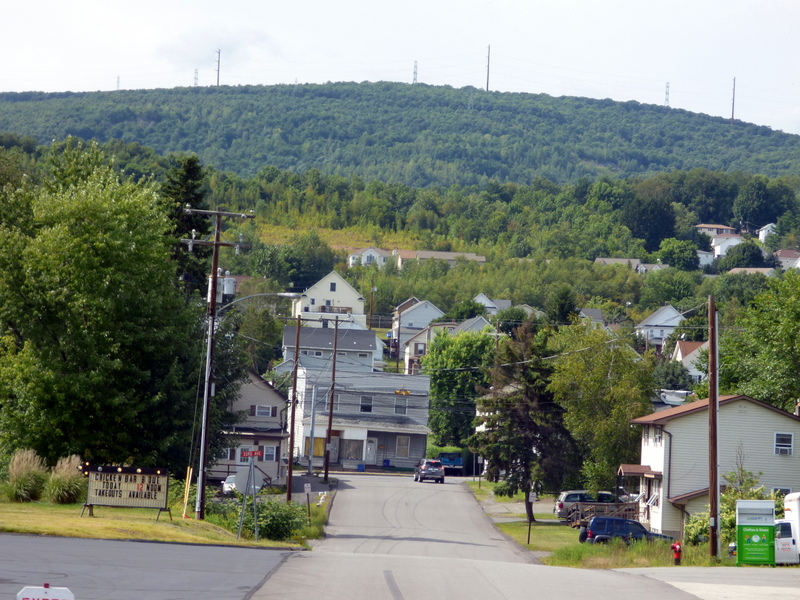

- Flag

- Location of Dickson City in Lackawanna County, Pennsylvania

- Location in Pennsylvania Location in the United States
- Coordinates: 41°27′58″N 75°37′31″W
- Country: United States
- State: Pennsylvania
- County: Lackawanna
- Founded: unknown date, probably c. 1863?

Government
  - Mayor: Robert W. MacCallum (D)

Area
  - Total: 4.80 sq mi (12.42 km^{2})
  - Land: 4.80 sq mi (12.42 km^{2})
  - Water: 0 sq mi (0.00 km^{2})
- Elevation: 827 ft (252 m)

Population (2020)
  - Total: 6,038
  - Density: 1,259.1/sq mi (486.15/km^{2})
- Time zone: UTC-5 (EST)
  - Summer (DST): UTC-4 (EDT)
- Zip Code: 18508, 18519, 18447 (Miles Plot area, shared with Olyphant)
- Area code: 570/272
- FIPS code: 42-19160
- Website: dicksoncityborough.org

Dickson City is a borough in Lackawanna County, Pennsylvania, United States, 4 miles (6 km) north of Scranton. Coal mining was an important industry in the past. The borough's population peaked at 12,395 in 1930 and was 6,051 at the 2020 census.

== History ==
Dickson City was once known as Priceburg. It was the newest village in the valley and one of the most progressive. German immigrants then founded the village of Priceville in 1863, in honor of Eli Price. This section of the town developed rapidly after 1880, when John Jermyn sank the shaft which is now known as the Johnson shaft. Here the population had grown from 329 to 841.

In June 1875, Dickson City was incorporated as a borough, including at the time all of the present borough of Throop. Dickson City received its name from Thomas Dickson, founder of the Dickson Manufacturing Company.

Once dominated by coal mines, this borough has in recent times become the center of a retail corridor focused along Business Route 6 and around the Viewmont Mall. Many of the nation's big-box stores and chain restaurants are represented here.

Most of the newer retail complexes are located along Viewmont Drive and Commerce Boulevard, both built by developers to access the borough's vast dormant coal lands. Some of the centers that were built in the 1990s and early 2000s include Dickson City Crossings, Dickson City Commons, Park Center and Commerce Plaza.

After Route 6 (also named the Scranton/Carbondale Highway), Main Street serves as the borough's other major thoroughfare. It features a slightly older stock of stores, bars, professional offices and homes.

One point of major contention in the borough has been a 240-acre (0.97 km^{2}) swath of reclaimed coal-mining land south of Commerce Boulevard that was deeded to the borough for public use after the state government cleaned it up. Plans to build a bond-financed municipal golf course on the land launched during the early 2000s were scuttled after some borough council members campaigned against that form of borrowing and won the majority of seats. The land was seized by a local bank after interim loans went unpaid, but because the state stipulated that it has to remain in the hands of a municipality, neighboring borough Dunmore snapped it up.

== Geography ==
Dickson City is located at 41°27′58″N 75°37′31″W (41.465984, -75.625401). According to the United States Census Bureau, the borough has a total area of 4.8 square miles (12 km^{2}), all land.

Interstate 81 has two commercially-important exits in Dickson City—one with Main Avenue and one with the old 6 (the Scranton-Carbondale Highway.) The Viewmont Mall is in both Dickson City and Scranton. The geographic location of the center of business dictates the revenue, according to Pennsylvania tax law.

== Demographics ==
Historical population
Census	Pop.	Note	%±
1870	391		—
1880	838		114.3%
1890	3,110		271.1%
1900	4,948		59.1%
1910	9,331		88.6%
1920	11,049		18.4%
1930	12,395		12.2%
1940	11,548		−6.8%
1950	8,948		−22.5%
1960	7,738		−13.5%
1970	7,698		−0.5%
1980	6,699		−13.0%
1990	6,276		−6.3%
2000	6,205		−1.1%
2010	6,070		−2.2%
2020	6,038		−0.5%
2021 (est.)	6,033	▼	−0.1%

=== 2010 ===
As of the census of 2010, there were 6,070 people, 2,703 households, and 1,636 families living in the borough. The population density was 1,264.6 inhabitants per square mile (488.3/km^{2}). There were 2,921 housing units at an average density of 608.5 units per square mile (234.9 units/km^{2}). The racial makeup of the borough was 95.9% White, 1% African American, 0.1% Native American, 0.7% Asian, 1.1% from other races, and 1.3% from two or more races. Hispanic or Latino of any race were 3.8% of the population.

There were 2,703 households, out of which 22.7% had children under the age of 18 living with them, 43.4% were married couples living together, 12.4% had a female householder with no husband present, and 39.5% were non-families. 33.9% of all households were made up of individuals, and 14.8% had someone living alone who was 65 years of age or older. The average household size was 2.24 and the average family size was 2.86.

In the borough the population was spread out, with 18.9% under the age of 18, 62% from 18 to 64, and 19.1% who were 65 years of age or older. The median age was 42.3 years.

The median income for a household in the borough was $31,422, and the median income for a family was $41,394. Males had a median income of $32,174 versus $23,766 for females. The per capita income for the borough was $17,370. About 3.5% of families and 6.9% of the population were below the poverty line, including 6.6% of those under age 18 and 8.7% of those age 65 or over.

=== 2000 ===
As of the census of 2000, there were 6,205 people, 2,692 households, and 1,722 families living in the borough. The population density was 1,317.4 inhabitants per square mile (508.7/km^{2}). There were 2,913 housing units at an average density of 618.5 units per square mile (238.8 units/km^{2}). The racial makeup of the borough was 98.82% White, 0.24% African American, 0.06% Native American, 0.26% Asian, 0.21% from other races, and 0.40% from two or more races. Hispanic or Latino of any race were 0.84% of the population.

There were 2,692 households, out of which 25.1% had children under the age of 18 living with them, 48.6% were married couples living together, 11.5% had a female householder with no husband present, and 36.0% were non-families. 31.6% of all households were made up of individuals, and 17.3% had someone living alone who was 65 years of age or older. The average household size was 2.30 and the average family size was 2.91.

In the borough the population was spread out, with 19.9% under the age of 18, 7.1% from 18 to 24, 28.6% from 25 to 44, 22.8% from 45 to 64, and 21.6% who were 65 years of age or older. The median age was 41 years. For every 100 females there were 88.4 males. For every 100 females age 18 and over, there were 85.6 males.

The median income for a household in the borough was $31,422, and the median income for a family was $41,394. Males had a median income of $32,174 versus $23,766 for females. The per capita income for the borough was $17,370. About 3.5% of families and 6.9% of the population were below the poverty line, including 6.6% of those under age 18 and 8.7% of those age 65 or over.

== Education ==
It is in the Mid Valley School District.

While the anthracite coal industry was thriving, there were numerous neighborhood schools: the Columbus School on Main Street between Bowman Street and Shaeffer Street, the Jefferson School on Bell Mountain where Center Street meets Laybourne Street, the Lafayette School on Main Street near Pancost Street, the Lincoln School at the corner of Lincoln Street and Grier Street, and the Wilson School at the corner of Boulevard Avenue and Bridge Street. Dickson City Junior High School was on a block on the block between Jackson Street and Jermyn Street and faced Albert Street; Dickson City Senior High School was next door and faced Carmalt Street.

As the population declined, the neighborhood schools were closed, and the junior high school became a kindergarten through 8th grade school. In 1969, the Olyphant, Dickson City, and Throop school districts consolidated to form the Mid Valley School District. Dickson City Junior High School became Mid-Valley Junior High School; Dickson City Senior High School became Dickson City Elementary School. Currently, the Mid-Valley School District has a single elementary school, and a single secondary school on Underwood Road in Throop.

Johnson Technical Institute is located just over the border in the nearby city, Scranton.

Dickson City is the location of one of the family service centers for Commonwealth Charter Academy, an online K-12 free public virtual charter school.

== Public safety ==
=== Police department ===
Dickson City Borough is currently served by a full-time police department consisting of both full-time and part-time police officers. The Dickson City Police headquarters is at 901 Enterprise Street. When requested the Lackawanna County Sheriff's Office, Lackawanna County SWAT, the Pennsylvania State Police (Dunmore Barracks), and neighboring municipal jurisdictions will assist borough police officers if additional law enforcement resources are needed.

=== Fire department ===
Eagle Hose Company No.1 provides fire and rescue services to the borough. Eagle Hose Company No. 1 (Dickson City Fire Department) operates 1 fire station (located at 1 Eagle Lane) which houses one ladder company, one engine company, one rescue company, and two support vehicles: an incident command SUV and utility pickup truck. The department is the only fire company in Dickson City Borough and is staffed by 100% volunteer firefighters. The fire company currently has 60 active members under the direction of Fire Chief Matthew Horvath. Eagle Hose Company No. 1 also has mutual aid agreements with neighboring fire departments to provide assistance to their coverage areas when requested. Mutual aid agreements are also in place to have other fire departments provide assistance to Dickson City Borough when requested, as well as give aid to surrounding boroughs. The Eagle Hose Company No. 1 is currently an ISO Class 3 Department. The Eagle Hose Company No. 1 is also recognized as a Participating Department within the Commonwealth of Pennsylvania through the Pennsylvania State Fire Commissioner's Office.

=== Emergency medical services ===
Pennsylvania Ambulance primarily renders emergency medical services (EMS) to borough residents and visitors. Pennsylvania Ambulance is a paid service that currently offers both basic life support (BLS) and advanced life support (ALS) services with 25 ambulances, seven quick response vehicles, one physician response vehicle, one ATV for off-road rescue, one special operations/rehab vehicle, ten wheelchair vans and one ten-passenger bus. While Pennsylvania Ambulances's main EMS station is located in Scranton, the organization sends its ambulances to strategic locations to best provide ambulance coverage throughout Lackawanna County. Commonwealth Health Emergency Medical Services and Cottage Hose Company Ambulance Corps will also provide ambulance coverage if they are the closest available service. Emergency services were previously provided by the Dickson City Community Ambulance Association, which was disbanded in 2020.

=== 9-1-1 service ===
The Lackawanna County Department of Emergency Services operates the 9-1-1 center responsible for all incoming calls and incidents occurring in Lackawanna County, including Dickson City Borough. It is also responsible for the dispatch and radio communication of all police, fire, and EMS services in Lackawanna County.
