= Joe Glenn (baseball) =

American baseball player (1908–1985)

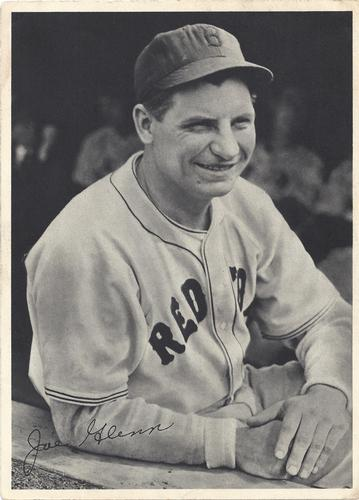
- Catcher
- Born: November 19, 1908; Dickson City, Pennsylvania, U.S.
- Died: May 6, 1985 (aged 76); Tunkhannock, Pennsylvania, U.S.
- Batted: Right Threw: Right

MLB debut
- September 15, 1932, for the New York Yankees

Last MLB appearance
- August 24, 1940, for the Boston Red Sox

MLB statistics
- Batting average: .252
- Home runs: 5
- Runs batted in: 89
- Stats at Baseball Reference

Teams
- New York Yankees (1932–1933, 1935–1938); St. Louis Browns (1939); Boston Red Sox (1940)

Joseph Charles Glenn (November 19, 1908 – May 6, 1985) was an American backup catcher in Major League Baseball who played for the New York Yankees (1932–33, 1935–38), St. Louis Browns (1939) and Boston Red Sox (1940). Glenn batted and threw right-handed.

== Biography ==
Born in Dickson City, Pennsylvania on November 19, 1908, Glenn caught Babe Ruth during his last pitching game, and also caught Ted Williams in Williams' only pitching appearance: it was at Fenway Park on August 24, 1940. In an eight-season career, Glenn posted a .252 batting average with five home runs and 89 RBI in 248 games played.

== Death ==
Glenn died in Tunkhannock, Pennsylvania, aged 76.
