= Mid Valley Secondary Center =

Public school in Throop, Pennsylvania, USA

Coordinates: 41.4485°N 75.6015°W

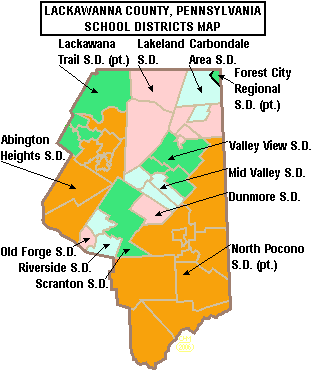

Location
- 52 Underwood Road; Throop, Lackawanna County, Pennsylvania 18512-1196; United States

Information
- Type: Public
- Established: 1969
- Principal: Dr. Cassandra Stout, Grades 10-12; Michael Elia, Grades 7-9
- Teaching staff: 55 teachers (2023-24)
- Grades: 7-12
- Enrollment: 882 (7-12): 578 (9-12), 304 (7-8)
- Colors: Blue and White
- Athletics conference: PIAA District 2
- Mascot: Spartans
- Website: https://sc.mvsd.us/

Mid Valley Secondary Center is a public secondary school located in Throop, Lackawanna County, Pennsylvania. It is the sole high school and junior high school operated by Mid Valley School District. For the 2023-24 school year, there were 882 students enrolled in 7th through 12th grades. The school employed 55 teachers.

High school aged students may choose to attend the Career Technology Center of Lackawanna County for vocational training.

== Extracurriculars ==
Mid Valley School District offers students the opportunity to participate in clubs, activities, and athletics.

=== Athletics ===
The historic rivals of the Mid Valley Spartans are the neighboring Valley View Cougars. An unofficial rivalry also exists with Holy Cross High School. According to the PA Department of Education public disclosure for 2023-24, the district funds:

==== Varsity ====
Classifications from 2023-24 PIAA.

Boys

- Baseball - AAAA
- Basketball - AAAA
- Cross country - AA
- Football - AAA
- Golf - AA
- Soccer - AA
- Tennis - AA
- Track and field - AA
- Wrestling - AA

Girls

- Basketball - AAAA
- Competitive Spirit (cheerleading) - AA
- Cross country - AA
- Golf - AA
- Soccer - AA
- Softball - AAA
- Swimming and diving (Note: Only 1 student, not listed in PIAA)
- Tennis - AA
- Track and field - AA
- Volleyball - AA
- Wrestling - AAAA (Note: No students listed in disclosure)

==== Junior high school ====
Boys

- Baseball
- Basketball
- Cross country
- Football (Note: Listed as a Freshman team in disclosure)
- Soccer
- Track and field
- Wrestling

Girls

- Basketball
- Cross country
- Soccer
- Softball
- Track and field

=== Student activities ===
According to the MCSC Student Handbook for 2024-25, the school offers:

- Aevidum Club
- Art Club
- Astronomy Club
- Band
- Cheerleading
- Chess Club
- Chorus
- Drama Club
- Family, Career, and Community Leaders of America (FCCLA) Club
- French Club
- Future Business Leaders of America (FBLA)
- GSA Club
- History Club
- Leo Club
- Mock Trial
- National Honor Society (NHS/NJHS)
- The Spartan Outlook (student newspaper)
- Outdoor Adventure Club
- Positive behavior interventions and supports (PBIS) Club
- Photography Club
- PA Junior Academy of Science (PJAS)
- Random Acts of Kindness (RAK) Club
- Robotics Club
- Scholastic Bowl
- Spanish Club
- Students Against Destructive Decisions (SADD)
- Student council
- Technology Club
- Yearbook
