= List of St. Louis Cardinals owners and executives =

The St. Louis Cardinals, a professional baseball franchise based in St. Louis, Missouri, compete in the National League (NL) of Major League Baseball (MLB).

== Owners, transactions and valuation ==
=== Chris von der Ahe (1882–1898) ===
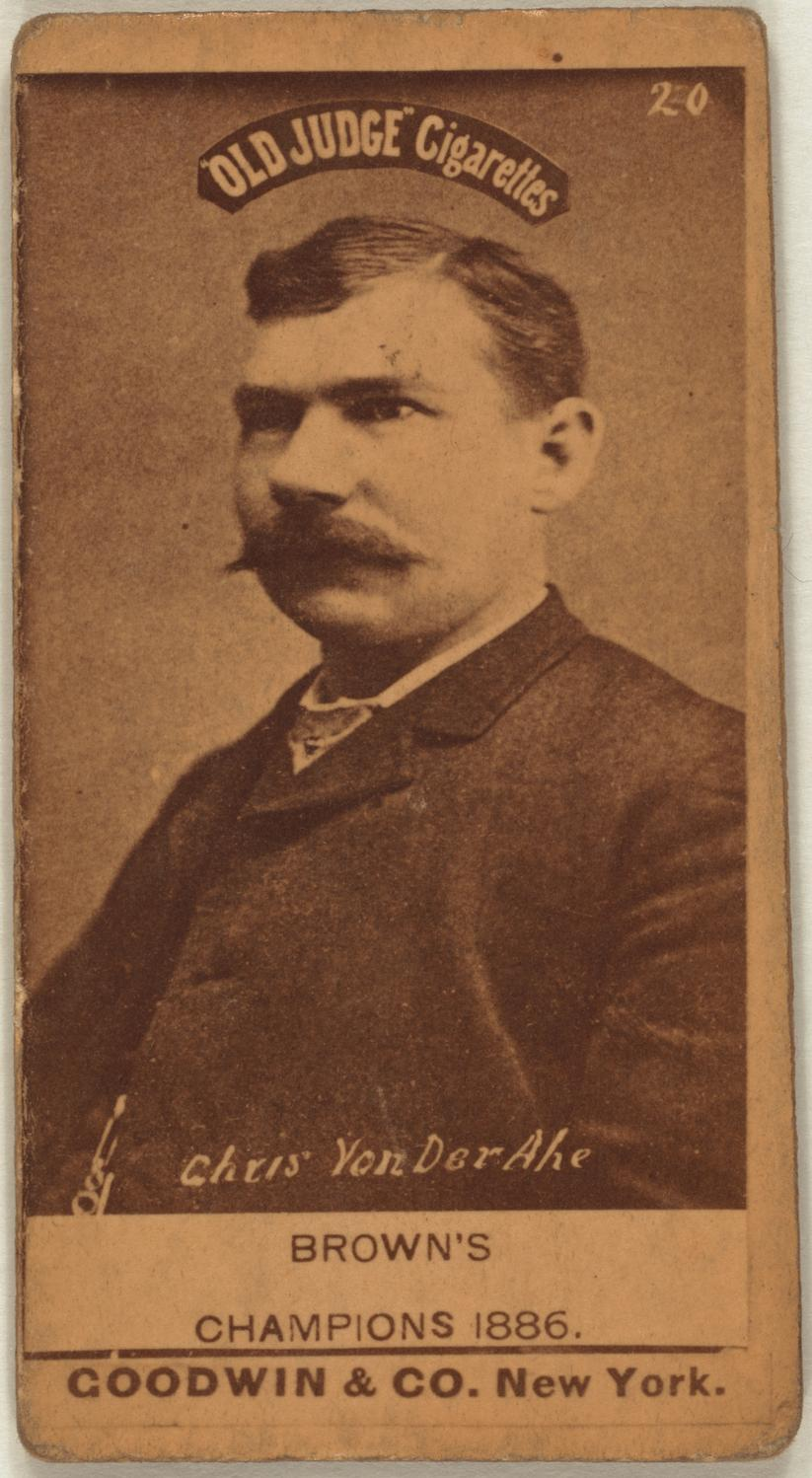
Chris von der Ahe baseball card.

In 1882, the St. Louis Brown Stockings were purchased by Chris von der Ahe, a German immigrant who became a grocer and saloon owner. He had no background in baseball but saw moneymaking potential in the sport. After the Browns profited $25,000 from playing a season's worth of informal contests, Von der Ahe bought out the team's remaining stockholders for $1,800. In 1882, Von der Ahe joined other owners to form the American Association of Base Ball Clubs.

Von der Ahe was a flamboyant and magnanimous entrepreneur who gained enormous popularity in St. Louis. He was willing to charge lower admission rates, encouraged play on Sundays, and sold beer at the stadium, a practice that the National League prohibited at the time. But he was reviled by owners, such Albert Spalding, who bristled at promotional techniques that are today common. Charlie O. Finley, Larry MacPhail, and Bill Veeck eventually employed sideshow attractions such as the "stadium club" and the shoot-the-chute.

Von der Ahe was one of the few owners to make a profit during his time. The American Association eventually collapsed due to bankruptcy. In 1899, Von der Ahe himself was forced to sell the Browns due to bankruptcy.

=== Sam Breadon (1920–1947) ===
Automobile dealer Sam Breadon purchased a minority stake in the Cardinals in 1917 for $2,000. Three years later, Breadon bought the majority stake in the club. He extinguished the futility that surrounded the Cardinals' first three decades in the National League: between 1926 and 1946, the Cardinals won six World Series titles and nine National League pennants. Between 1920 and 1947, the Cardinals compiled a record of 2,470-1,830, a winning percentage of .574.

Breadon was conservative with his finances, highly demanding of his teams' success on the field, and a maker of bold moves. When he became minority owner, the Cardinals were $150,000 in debt. In 1925, he moved Branch Rickey from the dugout to the front office and promoted second baseman Rogers Hornsby to player-manager. Breadon convinced cross-town American League rival St. Louis Browns owner Phil Ball to allow the Cardinals to move into Sportsman's Park. This allowed him to sell the dilapidated Robison Field property for a total of $275,000 to the city and a trolley company, clear the team's debts, and, with Rickey's oversight, establish an official, contractually-linked minor league farm system, the predecessor of today's minor league system. The Cardinals used it to circumvent the practice of bidding against the more affluent Major League teams such as the New York Yankees and New York Giants for players from minor league teams, which at that time were unaffiliated. It was the first player development system of its kind in professional sport.

In 1947, Breadon sold the Cardinals to Fred Saigh and Robert Hannegan for $3 million, at the time the largest transaction in baseball history.

=== Fred Saigh (1947–1953) ===
At the end of the 1947 baseball season, Saigh got wind that longtime Cardinals owner Sam Breadon wanted to sell. Breadon faced two problems. He was ill with prostate cancer, and he had been unable to find land on which to build a planned new ballpark. The Cardinals had rented Sportsman's Park from the city's other major league team, the American League Browns, since 1920. The Cardinals had long since surpassed the Browns as the city's most popular team, and Breadon wanted to build a park of his own. He had set aside $5 million to build a park, and was facing the end of a five-year deadline to build it before having to pay taxes on that money. Saigh persuaded Breadon to sell the Cardinals to him, with the assurance that he wouldn't have to pay taxes on his $5 million fund. To further put him at ease, Saigh brought in Robert Hannegan as a minority partner. Hannegan was a prominent St. Louis businessman, former United States Postmaster General, and confidante of President Harry Truman. The $4 million deal closed in late 1947.

Saigh inherited a team in transition. The Cardinals, though then just one year removed from their ninth National League pennant and sixth World Series championship since 1926, had begun to decay as an organization. Five years before, Breadon had forced out legendary general manager Branch Rickey, who had quickly resurfaced with the Brooklyn Dodgers. Meanwhile, the Browns, under new owner Bill Veeck, began a concerted effort to drive the Cardinals out of town.

In January 1949, Hannegan, suffering from poor health, sold his share of the team to Saigh. Hannegan died that October of heart disease. As sole owner, Saigh's notable actions included leading other baseball owners to oust (by not renewing his contract) Commissioner of Baseball Happy Chandler in December 1950 and proposing revenue-sharing of local television revenues.

However, the tax dodge Saigh used soon came to light, as well as other questionable practices on his part. Saigh was indicted on federal charges of evading $49,260 in income taxes between 1946 and 1949. In January 1953, he pleaded no contest to two counts involving more than $19,000 in tax underpayments, and was sentenced to 15 months in prison. He served five months at the federal penitentiary in Terre Haute, Indiana, leaving in November 1953 when he was given parole for good behavior.

In February 1953, under pressure from Commissioner Ford Frick, Saigh put the Cardinals up for sale. Saigh almost certainly would have been thrown out of baseball if he hadn't sold the team. For a time, no credible offers surfaced from St. Louis interests, making it seem likely that the team would be purchased by someone interested in moving them to another city. The most promising offer came from a consortium of businessmen in Houston, Texas. The Cardinals owned the Houston Buffaloes of the Texas League; under major-league rules of the time, that meant they also held the major-league rights to Houston. The only question was whether Buffalo Stadium could be upgraded to major-league standards.

However, just before he was due to reach a final agreement with the Houston group, Saigh sold the Cardinals to Anheuser-Busch, the St. Louis-based brewery. Although Anheuser-Busch's offer was far less ($3.75 million) than what out-of-town suitors had on the table, Anheuser-Busch president Gussie Busch persuaded Saigh that civic pride was more important than money. This all but assured that the Cardinals would stay in St. Louis. Shortly afterward, the Cardinals bought Sportsman's Park from the Browns. With their remaining leverage gone, it was the Browns who left town by the end of the season, becoming the Baltimore Orioles.

=== August "Gussie" Busch Jr. (1953–1989) ===
Gussie Busch's number 85 was retired by the St. Louis Cardinals in 1984.

In 1953, Cardinals owner Fred Saigh was convicted of tax evasion. Facing almost certain banishment from baseball, he put the Cardinals up for sale. When Busch got word that Saigh was considering selling the team to interests who would move the team to Houston, he decided to have Anheuser-Busch get into the bidding in order to keep the Cardinals in St. Louis.

Ultimately, Anheuser-Busch bought the Cardinals for $3.75 million–somewhat less than what Saigh was being offered by the Houston suitors. It has long been believed that Busch convinced Saigh that civic pride was more important than money. In truth, according to Anheuser-Busch biographer William Knoedelseder, Saigh's first preference had been to sell to local buyers. Busch had been the first credible buyer who was willing to keep the team in town.

As chairman, president or CEO of the Cardinals from the time the club was purchased by the brewery in 1953 until his death, Busch oversaw a team that won six National League pennants (1964, 1967, 1968, 1982, 1985, and 1987) and three World Series (1964, 1967 and 1982).

Although the Cardinals were the dominant baseball team in St. Louis, they did not own their own ballpark. Since 1920, they had rented Sportsman's Park from the St. Louis Browns of the American League. Shortly after buying the Cardinals, Busch bought and extensively renovated the park, renaming it Busch Stadium (but only after a failed attempt to rename it as Budweiser Stadium). The team played there until Busch Memorial Stadium opened in May 1966.

In 1984, the Cardinals retired a number, 85, in Busch's honor, which was his age at the time.

=== Anheuser-Busch (1989–1995) ===
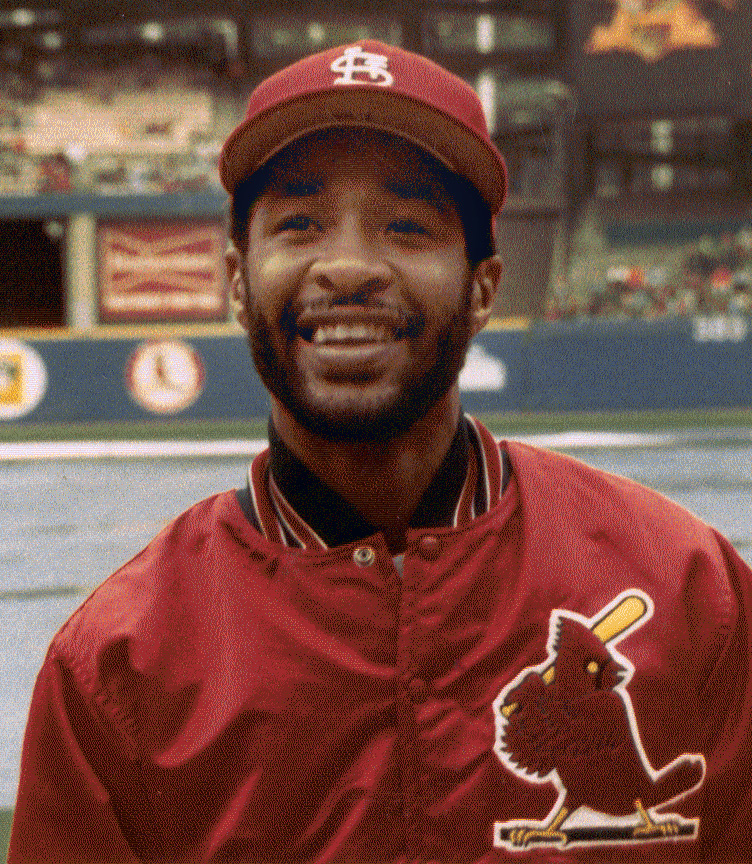
Shortstop Ozzie Smith won eleven Gold Gloves as a Cardinal and thirteen overall in his career.

After Gussie Busch died in 1989, the brewery took primary control of the Cardinals. Former Cardinal catcher and third baseman Joe Torre replaced Whitey Herzog as manager late in the 1990 season after he unexpectedly resigned. Despite an in-season trade to the Oakland A's that season, outfielder Willie McGee attained the requisite number of plate appearances to win his second NL batting title with the Cardinals at .335, making him the only player to win a batting title and end the same season in the other Major League. McGee's batting title was the main highlight in a season where the Cardinals finished last in the division (70–92, .432 winning percentage). It was the first occurrence that they finished last in the standings since 1918 (52–78, .395 winning percentage), when they finished last in the NL when the two leagues had not yet been split into divisions. However, the Atlanta Braves finished with the worst record in the NL (65–97, .401 winning percentage) in 1990. Thus, the Cardinals have avoided finishing last in the entire league every year since 1918, the longest such streak in Major League history and the 1990 season is still their only last place finish in their division.

Starting the next season, the Cardinals commenced a period of playing above expectations and continued a reputation of defensive excellence. Torre's teams won 83 or more games each season in 1991, 1992 and 1993. Shortstop Ozzie Smith, a fan favorite due to his acrobatics, smooth glove and powerful arm, set several defensive records, including the single-season record for fewest errors at shortstop (8) in 1991. He also set career marks at his position games played in 1993, assists (July 14, 1994), and double plays (1,554 on September 15, 1995), and won the Gold Glove every year from 1982 to 1992 with the Cardinals. The accolades did not stop with Smith, however. Between 1978 and 1992, St. Louis were represented with at least one Gold Glove winner each year. On September 7, 1993, Mark Whiten launched four home runs in the second game of a doubleheader against the Cincinnati Reds to go with 12 RBIs, both tying all-time single-game records.

In an effort to enhance stock value, Anheuser-Busch (AB) surprised St. Louis by announcing the Cardinals were for sale. They simultaneously announced plans to close a brewery in Tampa Bay and sell off their Eagle Snacks division. However, AB were resolute in their efforts to keep the Cardinals from moving out of St. Louis by selling the team only in a package deal with Busch Memorial Stadium. As a middle market metropolitan area, had AB not moved to create measures to keep the team in St. Louis, chances are they may have been moved to a larger market. AB sold the team at an undervalued price to a partnership headed by Southwest Bank's Drew Baur, Fred Hanser and William DeWitt, Jr. in December 1995. DeWitt has a long track record in baseball, commencing with his father, Bill DeWitt, who once worked for former Cardinals general manager (GM) Branch Rickey and owned the St. Louis Browns. DeWitt himself was a minority owner of the Texas Rangers and actively participated with the baseball clubs on which the elder DeWitt served. Hired during the AB era, the new ownership retained Jocketty.

=== DeWitt, Baur and Hanser (1996–present) ===
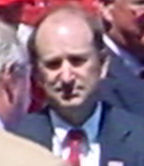
Current chairman and principal owner, Bill DeWitt Jr.

As with other periods of the Cardinals' transaction history, doubt loomed as to whether the purchaser would keep the team in St. Louis, due to the city's status as a "small market," which appear to handicap a club's competitiveness. Such was the case when Sam Breadon sold the Cardinals in 1947: then-NL President Ford Frick had proposed to Breadon the idea of moving the Cardinals to Chicago. When AB placed the Cardinals for sale in 1995, they publicly expressed intention to find a buyer who would keep the club in St. Louis. In March 1996, AB sold the team for $147 million to a partnership headed by Southwest Bank's Drew Baur, Hanser and DeWitt Jr. Civic Center Redevelopment, a subsidiary of AB, held the parking garages and adjacent property and also transferred them to the Baur ownership group. Baur's group then sold the garages to another investment group, making the net cost of the franchise purchase about $100 million, making the net purchase price about $10 million less than Financial World's value of the team at the time $110 million.

Current Cincinnati Reds owner Bob Castellini and brothers Thomas Williams and W. Joseph Williams Jr. each once owned a stake in the Cardinals dating back to the Baur-DeWitt group's purchase of the team. To allow their purchase of the Reds in 2005, the rest of the group bought out Castellini's and the Williams brothers' shares, totaling an estimated 13%. At that time, the Forbes valued the Cardinals at about $370 million. However, after reabsorbing that stake into the remainder of the group, they decided to make it available to new investors in 2010. Amid later allegations that the Cardinals owed the city profit shares, DeWitt revealed that their profitability had not reached the threshold to trigger that obligation.

=== Recent annual financial records ===
As of 2013, according to Forbes, the Cardinals are the tenth-most valuable franchise of 30 in MLB at $716.2 million, with a revenue of $239 million. They play "in the best single-team baseball market in the country and are among the league's leaders in television ratings and attendance every season." Concurrent with the growth of Major League Baseball, the Cardinals value has increased significantly since the Baur-DeWitt purchase. In 2000, the franchise was valued at $219 million, a growth rate of 327%. Since 2012, the franchise's value grew 21%.

St. Louis Cardinals' financial value since 2009
Year	$ Franchise Value (mil.) ^{1}	$ Revenue (mil.) ^{2}	$ Operating Income (mil.) ^{3}	$ Player Expenses (mil.) ^{4}	Wins-to-player cost ratio ^{5}
2009	$486	$195	$ 7	$120	87
2010	$488	$195	$12.8	$111	100
2011	$518	$207	$19.8	$110	94
2012 TV Money Is A Game Changer For Baseball and The Dodgers (Apr. 9 issue of Forbes)	$591	$233	$25.0	$123	116
2013 Baseball Team Valuations 2013: Yankees On Top At $2.3 Billion, Forbes (Mar. 27, 2013)	$716	$239	$19.9	$134	102

Valuation per Forbes.
^{1} Based on current stadium deal (unless new stadium is pending) without deduction for debt, other than stadium debt.
(2013: Market $291 mil., Stadium $182 mil., Sport $151 mil., Brand Management $91 mil.)
(2012: Market $240 mil., Stadium $157 mil., Sport $119 mil., Brand Management $78 mil.)
(2011: Market $206 mil., Stadium $136 mil., Sport $111 mil., Brand Management $65 mil.)

^{2} Net of stadium revenues used for debt payments.
^{3} Earnings before interest, taxes, depreciation and amortization.
^{4} Includes benefits and bonuses.
^{5} Compares the number of wins per player payroll relative to the rest of MLB. Playoff wins count twice as much as regular season wins. A score of 120 means that the team achieved 20% more victories per dollar of payroll compared with the league average in 2010.

== Principal owners ==
Tables key
†	Member of the Baseball Hall of Fame
Tenure	Tenure refers to MLB seasons, not necessarily dates hired and fired

Principal franchise owners showing eras of ownership
Name	Tenure	Ref(s)
Chris von der Ahe	1882–1898	
Frank Robison & Stanley Robison	1899–1908	
Stanley Robison	1909–1911	
Helene Hathaway Britton	1911–1916	
The Cardinal Idea	1917–1919	
Sam Breadon	1920–1947 β	
Robert E. Hannegan & Fred Saigh	1948	
Fred Saigh	1949–1952	
Gussie Busch	1953–1989	
Anheuser-Busch	1989–1995	
William DeWitt Jr.	1996–present	

- Note: β – Breadon was co-owner from 1917 to 1920 with no majority team owners at that time, but became principal owner in 1920 when he became president and the largest shareholder. He bought controlling interest in 1922 and held it until 1947, when he sold the team to Saigh and Hannegan.

== CEOs ==
List of CEOs and their eras
Name	Tenure	Ref(s)
Bill DeWitt III	2026–present	

== Presidents ==
The president typically reports direct to the owner in the case where the two positions were not held by the same person.

List of presidents and their eras
Name	Tenure	Ref(s)
Branch Rickey	1919–1920	
Sam Breadon	1920–1947	
Gussie Busch	1953–1989	
Fred Kuhlmann	1989–1991	
Stuart Meyer	1992–1994	
Mark Lamping	1994–2008	
Bill DeWitt III	2008–2026	

== Presidents of baseball operations ==
List of presidents of baseball operations and their eras
Name	Tenure	Ref(s)
John Mozeliak	2017–2025	
Chaim Bloom	2026–present	

== General managers ==
A total of 15 general managers have served for the Cardinals. Branch Rickey was the Cardinals' first official GM – however, his role initially called for him to function more as a business manager – as he pioneered certain functions attributed to the contemporary GM, such as developing the forerunner of the minor league farm system that all Major League Baseball franchises use today. Rickey is also the longest-tenured GM in franchise history with 23 years. Notable Cardinals who have served as GM but gained their notoriety through other roles while with the Cardinals include former outfielder Stan Musial and manager Whitey Herzog. Rickey, William Walsingham Jr., Musial, Joe McDonald, Walt Jocketty and Mozeliak each won at least one World Series as Cardinals GM. Rickey won the most with four. Hall of Fame inductees who have served as GM for the Cardinals include Herzog, Musial, and Rickey.

List of general managers and their eras
Name	Tenure	Ref(s)
Branch Rickey^{†}	1919–1942	
William Walsingham Jr.	1942–1953	
Richard A. Meyer	1953–1955	
Frank Lane	1955–1957	
Bing Devine	1957–1964, 1967–1978	
Bob Howsam	1964–1967	
Stan Musial^{†}	1967	
John Claiborne	1978–1980	
Whitey Herzog^{†}	1980–1982	
Joe McDonald	1982–1984	
Dal Maxvill	1984–1994	
Walt Jocketty	1994–2007	
John Mozeliak	2007–2017	
Mike Girsch	2017–2024	
Rob Cerfolio	2027–present	

== Other executives ==
=== Prior executives ===
- Sheldon "Chief" Bender
- Bob Gebhard
- Marty Hendin
- Fred Koenig
- Fred McAlister
- Joe McDonald
- George Silvey
- Lee Thomas, Director of player personnel (1980–1988)
- Dick Wagner
- Jerry Walker

== Related lists ==
- List of St. Louis Cardinals managers
- List of St. Louis Cardinals coaches
- List of St. Louis Cardinals seasons
