= William Walsingham Jr. =

American baseball executive

- Born: July 9, 1909; St. Louis, Missouri, U.S.
- Died: April 13, 1969 (aged 59); St. Louis, Missouri, U.S.
- Occupation: Major League Baseball executive
- Years active: 1942–1958

William Walsingham Jr. (July 9, 1909 – April 13, 1969) was an American front office executive in Major League Baseball. He spent the bulk of his 30-year career with the St. Louis Cardinals, owned by his uncle, Sam Breadon, from 1920 through 1947. He also served as a vice president of Breadon's Western Automobile Company, later Sam Breadon Inc.

Walsingham began as a ticket-taker with the Cardinals, but by the early 1940s he had become a vice president of the Redbirds. When Breadon parted company with his longtime general manager, Hall of Famer Branch Rickey, at the close of the 1942 campaign, Walsingham became the club's chief of baseball operations, although the GM title was not formally assigned to him. He was part of a management triumvirate that included Breadon and the Cardinals' chief scout, Joe Mathes.

Walsingham continued as a vice president of the Cards, GM without portfolio, and a member of its board of directors after Breadon sold the club to Robert E. Hannegan and Fred Saigh in November 1947. In January 1953, Saigh was forced to dispose of the Cardinals after his conviction on income tax evasion charges. Walsingham stepped in as the team's official National League representative and chief executive, as rumors swirled that he would assemble a syndicate to buy the franchise. However, August A. Busch Jr. came forward as the team's new owner; the "beer baron" would operate the Cardinals for the next 36 years.

Busch appointed a brewery executive, Richard A. Meyer, as the Cardinals' general manager upon his purchase of the team, but Walsingham remained a vice president in the Cardinal front office until October 1955, when Frank Lane succeeded Meyer as GM. Walsingham said that he resigned "because I believe a ball club cannot be successfully run by two people, both of whom are confident they can do the job."

In 1957, Walsingham was named an executive vice president with the American League's Baltimore Orioles — ironically, the transplanted St. Louis Browns, who from 1902 to 1953 fought an ultimately losing battle against the Cardinals for the affections of the city's fans before leaving town. His appointment was an attempt by the Orioles' owners to rein in Paul Richards' freewheeling spending on amateur talent and phase him out of his general manager duties to concentrate on managing the ballclub. But Walsingham failed to establish any authority within the organization and was ignored by Richards, who continued to operate in his dual GM/field manager role unimpeded. Walsingham was dismissed on October 30, 1958 and eventually replaced by Lee MacPhail, who became general manager after Richards agreed to relinquish those duties.

Walsingham then returned to St. Louis to become a marketing consultant with Busch's Anheuser-Busch brewery. He died in his native city of a heart ailment at age 59 on April 13, 1969, survived by his wife and four children.

== See also ==
- List of St. Louis Cardinals owners and executives
