= List of St. Louis Cardinals managers =

Managers and tenures of Major League Baseball club

The St. Louis Cardinals, a professional baseball franchise based in St. Louis, Missouri, compete in the National League (NL) of Major League Baseball (MLB). Prior to entering the NL in 1892, they were also a member of the American Association (AA) from 1882 to 1891.^{[a]} They have won 11 World Series titles as an NL team, one pre-World Series championship and tied another against the NL. Since 1900, the team has been known as the Cardinals. They were originally named the Perfectos. Baseball teams like St. Louis employ a manager to make on-field decisions for the team during the game, similar to the head coach position of other sports. A number of coaches report to the manager, including the bench coach, first and third base coaches, and pitching and hitting coaches, among other coaches and instructors. Mike Matheny, a former catcher for the Cardinals from 2000 to 2004, was the manager from 2012–2018, when he was relieved following a series of disputes, including allegations that he would not speak with Dexter Fowler. He was signed through 2017 and extended to the 2018 season when he was fired. The Cardinals hired bench coach Mike Shildt as interim manager.

Matheny is one of 63 total individuals who have managed the Cardinals, more than any other Major League franchise. Between 1882 and 1918 – 37 total seasons – 37 different managers stayed the helm. Ned Cuthbert became the first manager of the then-Brown Stockings in 1882, serving for one season. Also an outfielder for a former St. Louis Brown Stockings club, he was directly responsible for bringing professional baseball back to St. Louis after a game-fixing scandal expelled the earlier team from the NL in 1877. He rallied a barnstorming team that attracted the attention of eventual owner Chris von der Ahe, who directly negotiated for the team to be a charter member of a new league, the AA, in 1882. Charles Comiskey was the first manager in franchise history to hold the position for multiple seasons. He also owns the highest career winning percentage in franchise history at .673, four American Association pennants (1885–1888) and one interleague championship (before the official World Series existed).^{[b]} He also held the record for most career wins in team history with from 1884 to 1945 (563 total) and games managed (852) until 1924. However, von der Ahe changed managers more than any other owner in team history – a total of 27 in 19 season oversaw the team on the field. After the Robison era began, stability marginally improved: nine managers in 20 years from 1899 to 1918. Jack McCloskey, Roger Bresnahan, and Miller Huggins each managed three or more seasons from 1906 to 1917, becoming the first group to manage multiple seasons in succession.

Branch Rickey, known mainly as a general manager, surpassed Comiskey's record for games managed in 1924, totaling 947 in seven seasons. His replacement, Rogers Hornsby – also the second baseman who won two Triple Crowns and six consecutive batting titles – finally guided the Cardinals to their first modern World Series championship against the formidable New York Yankees, their first interleague championship in exactly 40 years. Sam Breadon, the Cardinals' owner, also frequently changed managers (although Frankie Frisch and Gabby Street both managed at least five seasons and won one World Series title apiece in the 1930s out of nine total managers in 30 seasons) until settling on Hall of Famer Billy Southworth from 1940 to 1945.

Southworth set new team records for games managed (981), wins (620) and World Series championships (two). His Cardinals teams won 105 or more games each year from 1942 to 1944, winning the NL pennants in each of those three seasons. His .642 winning percentage is second-highest in team history, and the highest since the Cardinals joined the National League. Southworth was also awarded The Sporting News Manager of the Year Award in 1941 and 1942. Starting in 1953 with the Gussie Busch/Anheuser-Busch era, thirteen managers captained the club in 43 seasons. After Southworth, Eddie Dyer, Eddie Stanky, Fred Hutchinson and Johnny Keane also each took home a Sporting News Manager of the Year award. Keane's 1964 team that year's World Series. Hall of Famer Red Schoendienst took over from 1965 to 1977 and won one World Series and two NL pennants. Schoendienst then broke Southworth's team records for games (1,999 total) and wins (1,041). He also held records of 14 seasons managed and 955 losses.

In the 1980s, Hall of Famer Whitey Herzog's style of play known as Whiteyball pushed the Cardinals to three NL pennants and a World Series championship in 1982. He was named the Sporting News Sportsman of the Year and Manager of the Year in 1982. In 1990, Joe Torre took over and Tony La Russa succeeded him when the William DeWitt, Jr. ownership – still the current ownership – commenced in 1996. La Russa finished with the longest tenure in franchise history (16 seasons), and leads Cardinals managers in wins (1,408), losses (1,182), playoff appearances (nine) and is tied for most World Series championships (two). He also won three NL pennants. Matheny took over from La Russa.

Besides La Russa, eight Cardinals managers have won a modern World Series: Hornsby, Frisch, Street, Dyer, Southworth, Keane, Schoendienst and Herzog; Southworth and La Russa are the only ones to win two each. Comiskey won one pre-World Series title and tied for another. Cardinals managers inducted into the Baseball Hall of Fame include Comiskey, Tommy McCarthy, Roger Connor, Kid Nichols, Bresnahan, Huggins, Rickey, Hornsby, Bill McKechnie, Southworth, Frisch, Schoendienst, Herzog, Torre and La Russa.

== Table key ==
#	Ordinal number in the succession of managers^{[b]}
G	Regular season games managed (may not equal sum of wins and losses due to tie games)
W	Regular season wins
L	Regular season losses
Win%	Winning percentage
PA	Postseason appearances: number of years this manager has led the franchise to the postseason
PW	Postseason wins
PL	Postseason losses
LC	League championships: number of League championships, or pennants, achieved by the manager
WS	World Series Championships: number of World Series championships achieved by the manager
Awards	Awarded MVP (V) as a player-manager, MLB Manager of the Year (given annually since 1983) (M), and The Sporting News Sportsman of the Year (awarded annually since 1968) (S) and The Sporting News Manager of the Year Award (awarded annually since 1936) (Y) while managing for the Cardinals.
Ref	Reference(s)
*	Also a player for the Cardinals
∂	Former MLB All-Star
§	Inducted into the Baseball Hall of Fame as a Cardinal
†, ‡	Inducted into the Baseball Hall of Fame primarily as a player (†) or as a manager and/or an executive (‡)

== Table of managers ==
Statistics current as of the end of the 2025 Major League Baseball season

#^{[c]}	Manager	Seasons	G	W	L	Win%	PA	PW	PL	LC	WS	Awards	Ref
1	Ned Cuthbert *	1882	80	37	43	.463	—	—	—	—	—	—	
2	Ted Sullivan	1883	79	53	26	.671	—	—	—	—	—	—	
3	Charles Comiskey *‡	1883, 1884–1889, 1891	852	563	273	.673	4	16	21	4	—	—	
4	Jimmy Williams	1884	85	51	33	.607	—	—	—	—	—	—	
5	Tommy McCarthy *†	1890	27	15	12	.571	—	—	—	—	—	—	
6	John Kerins *	1890	17	9	8	.529	—	—	—	—	—	—	
7	Chief Roseman *	1890	15	7	8	.467	—	—	—	—	—	—	
8	Count Campau *	1890	42	27	14	.659	—	—	—	—	—	—	
9	Joe Gerhardt *	1890	38	20	16	.556	—	—	—	—	—	—	
10	Jack Glasscock *	1892	4	1	3	.250	—	—	—	—	—	—	
11	Cub Stricker *	1892	23	6	17	.261	—	—	—	—	—	—	
12	Jack Crooks *	1892	62	27	33	.450	—	—	—	—	—	—	
13	George Gore *	1892	16	6	9	.400	—	—	—	—	—	—	
14	Bob Caruthers *	1892	50	16	32	.333	—	—	—	—	—	—	
15	Bill Watkins	1893	135	57	75	.432	—	—	—	—	—	—	
16	Doggie Miller *	1894	133	56	76	.424	—	—	—	—	—	—	
17	Al Buckenberger	1895	50	16	34	.320	—	—	—	—	—	—	
18	Chris von der Ahe	1895, 1896, 1897	17	3	14	.176	—	—	—	—	—	—	
19	Joe Quinn *	1895	40	11	28	.282	—	—	—	—	—	—	
20	Lou Phelan	1895	45	11	30	.268	—	—	—	—	—	—	
21	Harry Diddlebock	1896	17	7	10	.412	—	—	—	—	—	—	
22	Arlie Latham *	1896	3	0	3	.000	—	—	—	—	—	—	
23	Roger Connor *†	1896	46	8	37	.178	—	—	—	—	—	—	
24	Tommy Dowd *	1896–1897	92	31	60	.341	—	—	—	—	—	—	
25	Hugh Nicol *	1897	40	8	32	.200	—	—	—	—	—	—	
26	Bill Hallman *	1897	50	13	36	.265	—	—	—	—	—	—	
27	Tim Hurst	1898	154	39	111	.260	—	—	—	—	—	—	
28	Patsy Tebeau *	1899–1900	247	126	117	.519	—	—	—	—	—	—	
29	Louie Heilbroner	1900	50	23	25	.479	—	—	—	—	—	—	
30	Patsy Donovan *	1901–1903	421	175	236	.426	—	—	—	—	—	—	
31	Kid Nichols *†	1904–1905	169	80	88	.476	—	—	—	—	—	—	
32	Jimmy Burke *	1905	90	34	56	.378	—	—	—	—	—	—	
33	Stanley Robison	1905	50	19	31	.380	—	—	—	—	—	—	
34	John McCloskey	1906–1908	463	153	304	.335	—	—	—	—	—	—	
35	Roger Bresnahan *†	1909–1912	618	255	352	.420	—	—	—	—	—	—	
36	Miller Huggins *‡	1913–1917	774	346	415	.455	—	—	—	—	—	—	
37	Jack Hendricks	1918	133	51	78	.395	—	—	—	—	—	—	
38	Branch Rickey ‡	1919–1925	947	458	485	.486	—	—	—	—	—	—	
39	Rogers Hornsby *†§	1925–1926	271	153	116	.569	1	4	3	1	1	V	
40	Bob O'Farrell *	1927	153	92	61	.601	—	—	—	—	—	V	
41	Bill McKechnie ‡	1928–1929	217	129	88	.594	1	0	4	1	0	––	
42	Billy Southworth *‡§	1929, 1940–1945	981	680	346	.642	3	9	7	3	2	Y (2)	
43	Gabby Street *	1929–1933	556	312	242	.563	2	6	7	2	1	––	
44	Frankie Frisch *†§	1933–1938	822	458	354	.564	1	4	3	1	1	––	
45	Mike González *	1938, 1940	23	9	13	.409	—	—	—	—	—	—	
46	Ray Blades *	1939–1940	194	106	85	.555	—	—	—	—	—	—	
47	Eddie Dyer *	1946–1950	777	446	325	.578	1	4	3	1	1	Y	
48	Marty Marion *	1951	155	81	73	.526	—	—	—	—	—	—	
49	Eddie Stanky *	1952–1955	501	260	238	.522	—	—	—	—	—	Y	
50	Harry Walker *	1955	118	51	67	.432	—	—	—	—	—	—	
51	Fred Hutchinson	1956–1958	434	232	220	.513	—	—	—	—	—	—	
52	Stan Hack	1958	10	3	7	.300	—	—	—	—	—	—	
53	Solly Hemus *	1959–1961	384	190	192	.497	—	—	—	—	—	—	
54	Johnny Keane	1961–1964	567	317	249	.560	1	4	3	1	1	Y	
55	Red Schoendienst *†§	1965–1976, 1980, 1990	1,999	1,041	955	.522	2	7	7	2	1	––	
56	Vern Rapp	1977–1978	179	89	90	.497	—	—	—	—	—	—	
57	Jack Krol	1978, 1980	3	1	2	.500	—	—	—	—	—	—	
58	Ken Boyer *	1978–1980	357	166	190	.466	—	—	—	—	—	—	
59	Whitey Herzog ‡§	1980–1990	1,553	822	728	.530	3	21	16	3	1	S, Y, M	
60	Joe Torre *∂‡	1990–1995	706	351	354	.498	—	—	—	—	—	—	
61	Mike Jorgensen *	1995	96	42	54	.438	—	—	—	—	—	—	
62	Tony La Russa ‡	1996–2011	2,591	1,408	1,182	.544	9	50	42	3	2	M	
63	Mike Matheny *	2012–2018	1,074	591	474	.555	3	21	22	1	0	—	
64	Mike Shildt	2018–2021	451	252	199	.559	3	4	9	—	—	M	
65	Oliver Marmol	2022–present	648	325	323	.502	1	0	2	—	—	—	
AA totals (1882–1891) ^{[a]}			1,233	780	432	.644	4	16	21	4	1^{[b]}	––	
NL (1892–1919)			4,128	1,632	2,425	.402	0	0	0	0	0	––	
NL (1920–1952)			5,112	2,898	2,171	.572	9	27	27	9	6	––	
NL (1953–1989)			5,867	3,038	2,814	.519	6	32	26	6	3	––	
NL (1990–present)			4,631	2,462	2,167	.532	12	70	61	4	2	––	
NL totals (1892–present)^{[c]}			19,900	10,030	9,577	.512	27	129	114	19	11	––	
All-time totals			20,971	10,810	10,009	.519	31	145	135	23	12^{[b]}	––	

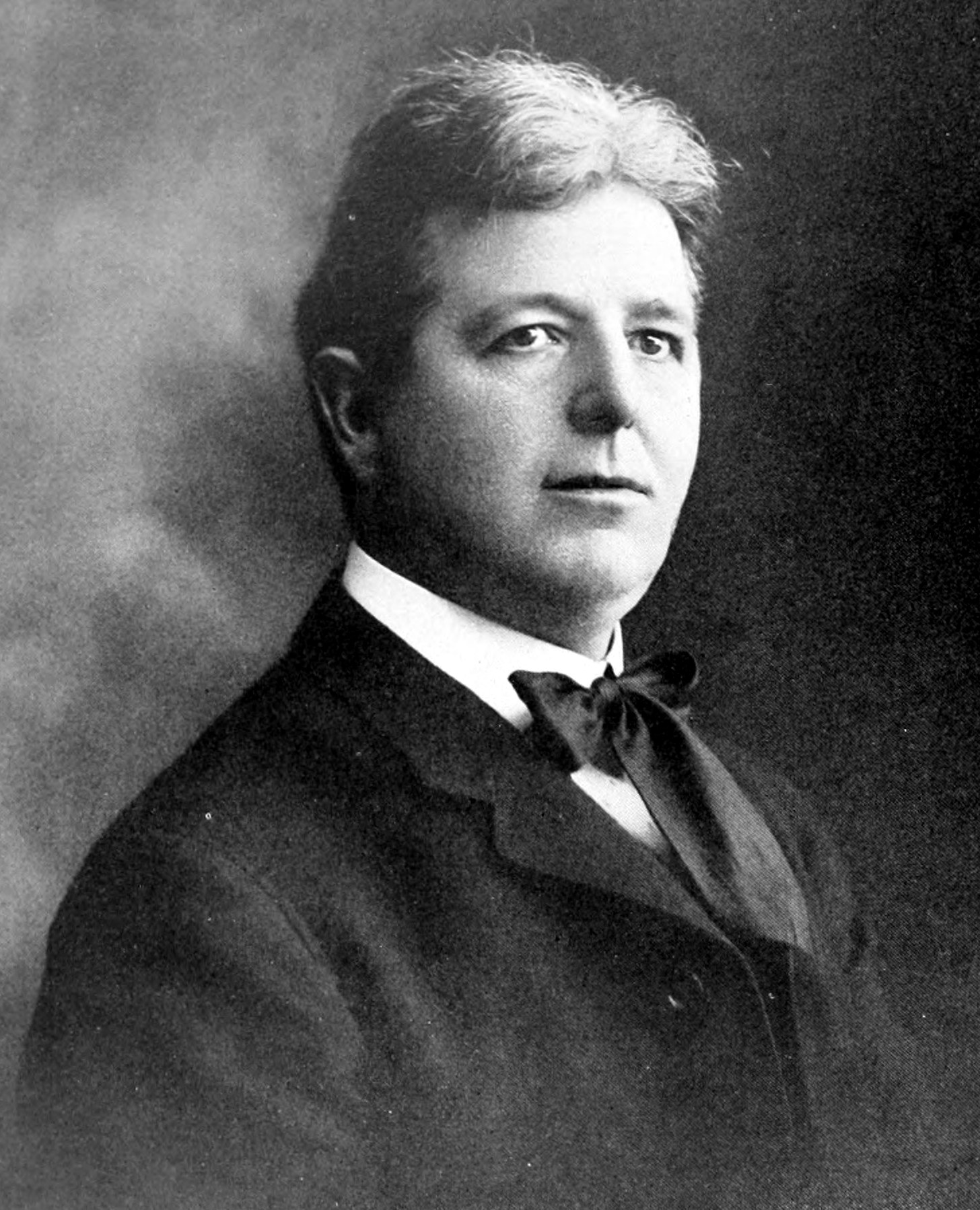
Charles Comiskey led the then-St. Louis Browns to a championship in 1886 and four consecutive American Association titles.

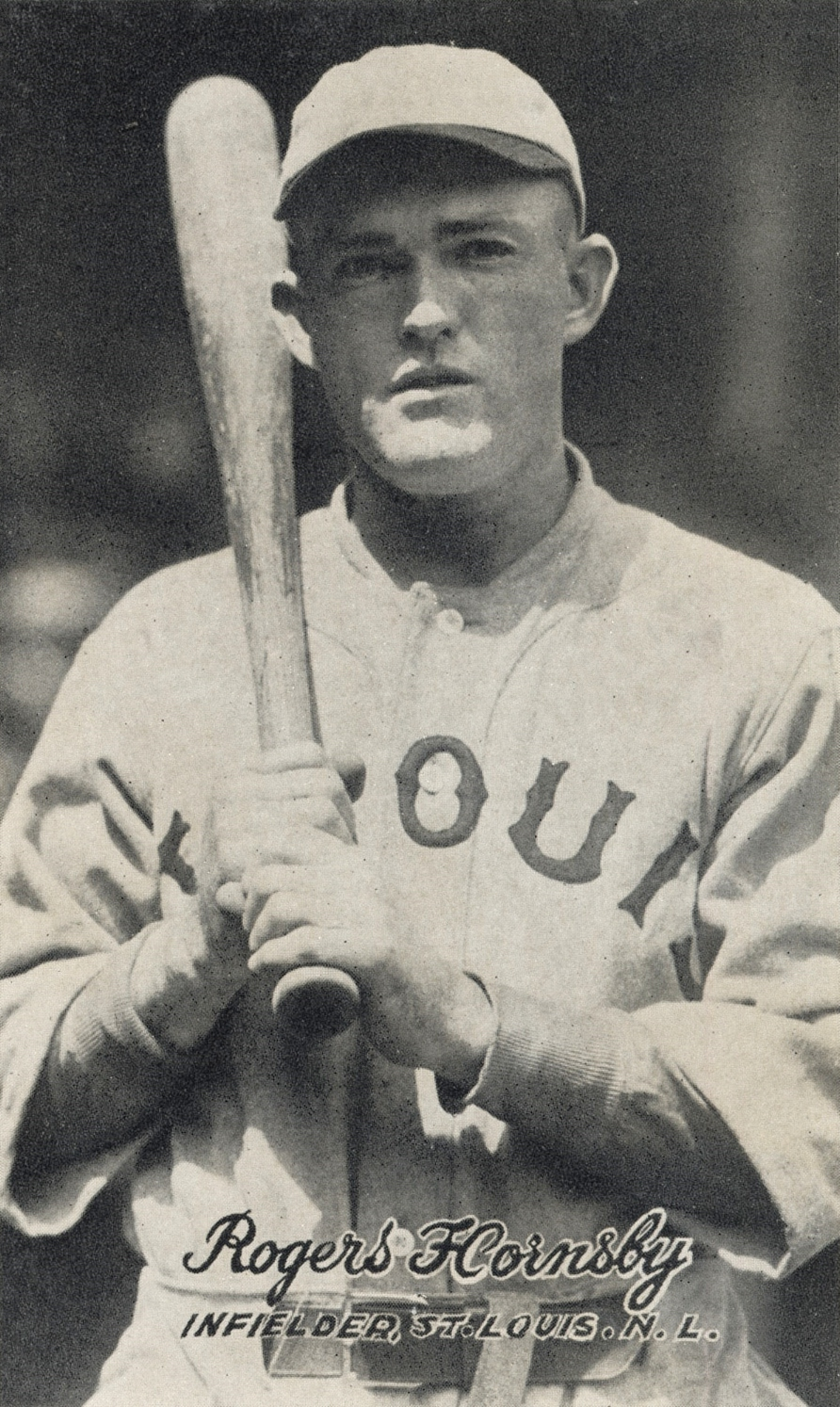
Rogers Hornsby led the Cardinals to their first World Series championship as player-manager in 1926.

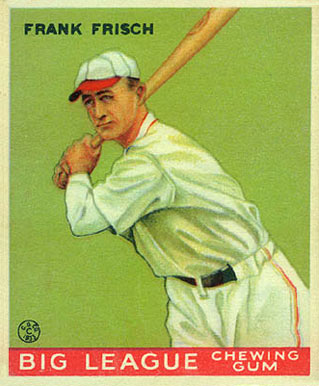
Frankie Frisch's Goudey card. Elected to the Hall of Fame in 1947, Frisch guided the Cardinals for six seasons and .564 winning percentage, leading them to the 1934 World Series title.

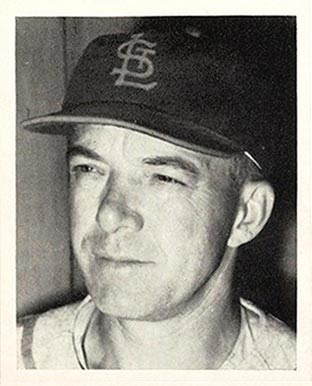
Billy Southworth oversaw a five-year run from 1941 to 1945 of five straight 95+ win seasons with three league pennants (1942–1944) and two World Series championships (1942, 1944)

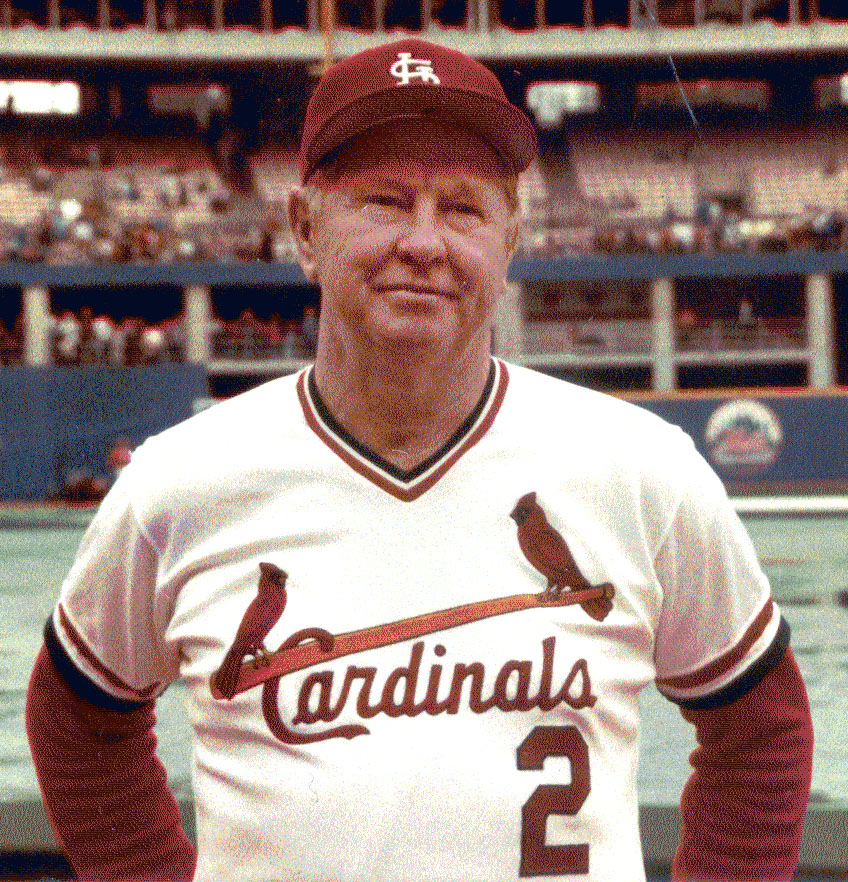
Red Schoendienst managed the Cardinals from 1965 to 1976 (with brief stints in 1978, 1980) and won two World Series titles with St. Louis.

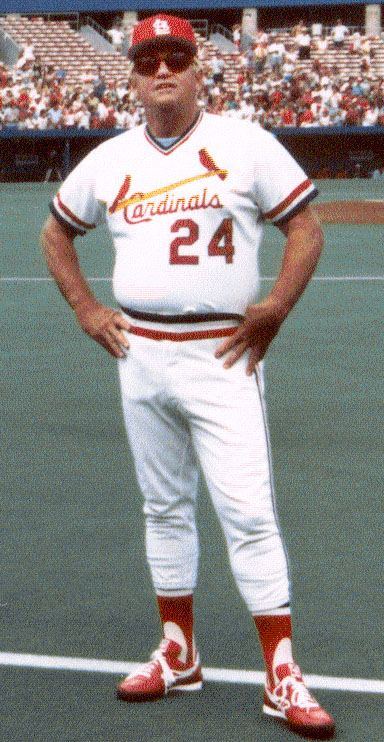
Whitey Herzog managed the Cardinals from 1980 to 1990 and won one World Series titles with St. Louis.

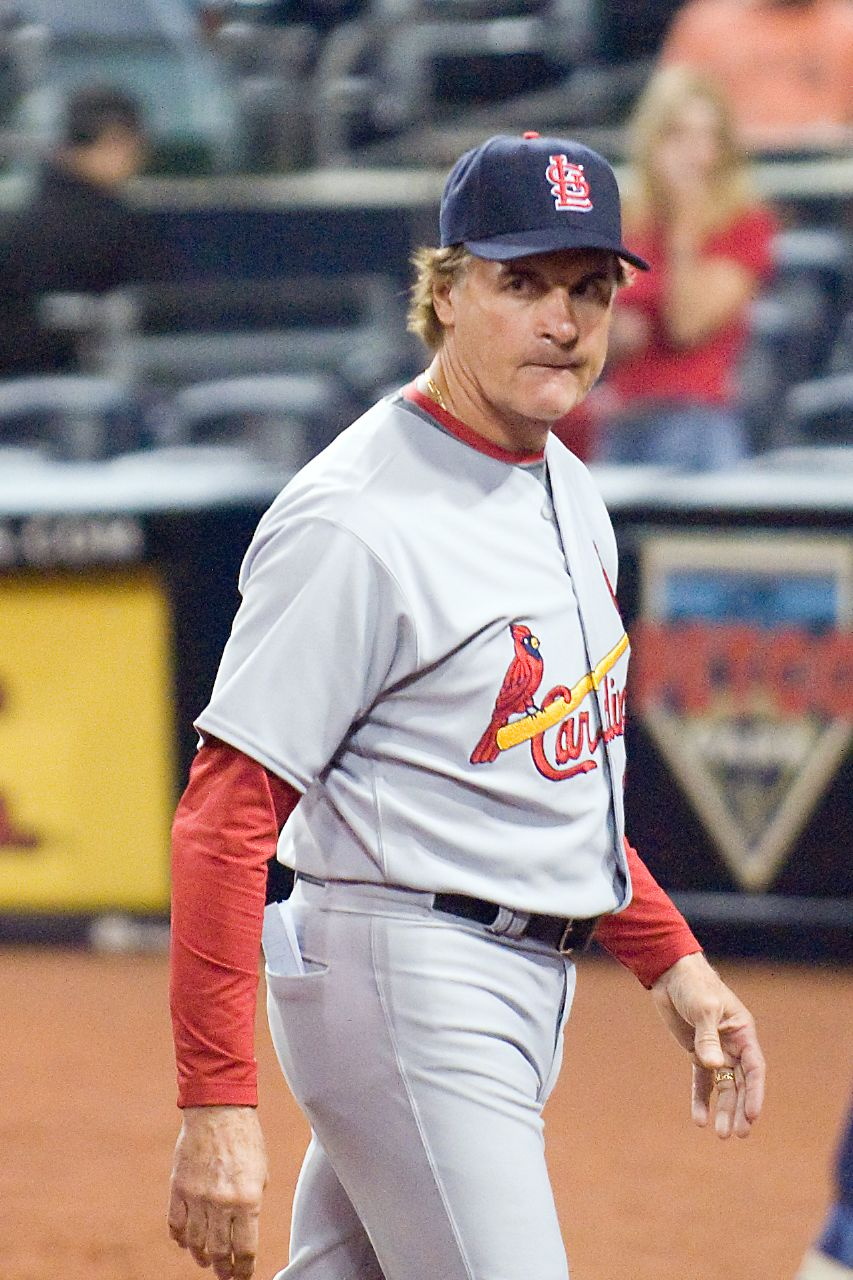
Tony La Russa managed the Cardinals from 1996 to 2011 and won two World Series titles with St. Louis.

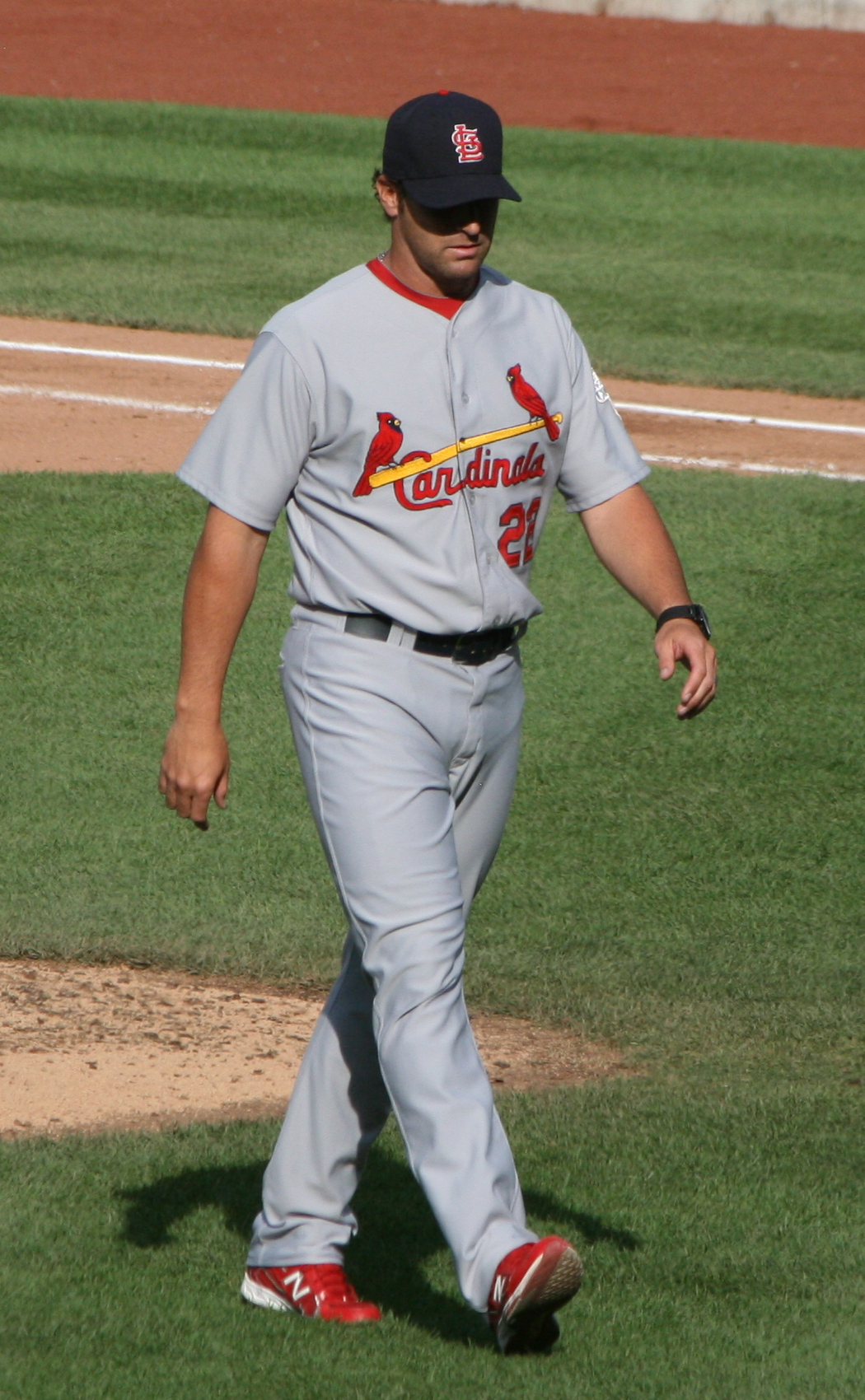
Mike Matheny managed the Cardinals from 2012 to 2018.

== Related lists ==
- List of St. Louis Cardinals owners and executives
- List of St. Louis Cardinals coaches
- List of St. Louis Cardinals seasons
