= Diddlebock =

Diddlebock may refer to:

- The Sin of Harold Diddlebock, 1947 comedy film directed by Preston Sturges
- Harry Diddlebock, (1854–1900), sportswriter and Major League Baseball manager
