= Lou Phelan =

American baseball manager

- Manager
- Born: March 1864; St. Louis, Missouri, U.S.
- Died: November 2, 1933; Los Angeles, California, U.S.
- Batted: Unknown Threw: Unknown

MLB statistics
- Games managed: 45
- Managerial record: 11–30
- Winning percentage: .268

Teams
- St. Louis Browns (1895)

Louis A. "Lou" Phelan (March, 1864 – November 2, 1933) was a manager in Major League Baseball in the 1895 season, with the St. Louis Browns. A saloon-keeper, Phelan was hired on the basis that owner Chris von der Ahe was seeing a mistress that happened to be sister of Phelan's wife. During his lone season as manager, he led the Browns to 11 wins, with 30 losses in 45 games. After managing in those 45 games in 1895, he was replaced by Harry Diddlebock.

He was born in St. Louis, Missouri and died in Los Angeles. Phelan is buried at Calvary Cemetery in Los Angeles.
