= Bill DeWitt III =

American baseball executive

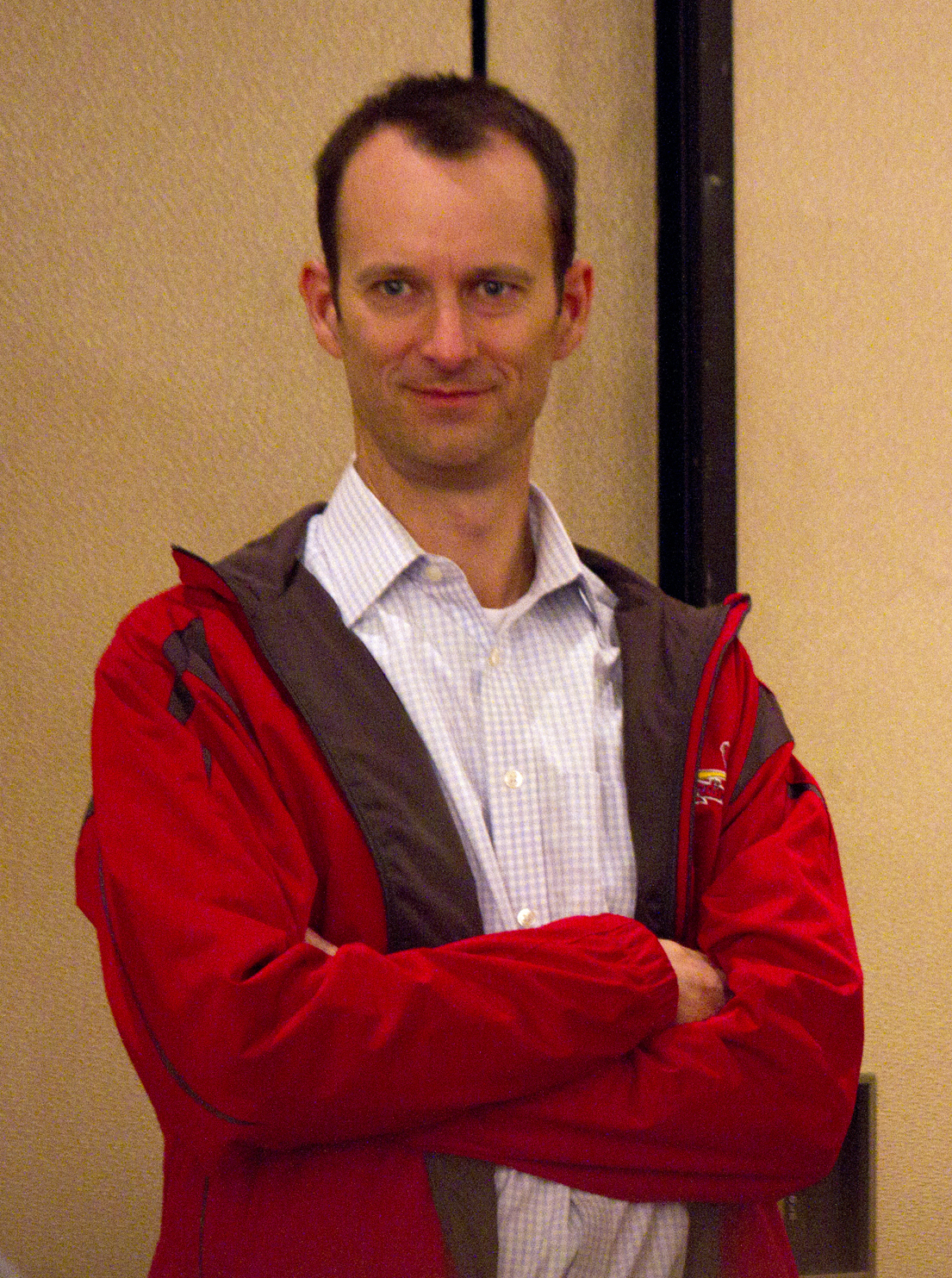
- DeWitt in 2013
- Born: March 8, 1968 (age 58); Cincinnati, Ohio, U.S.
- Education: Yale University (BA); Harvard University (MBA)
- Title: CEO of the St. Louis Cardinals
- Spouse: Ira Aldanmaz
- Children: 3
- Parent: William DeWitt Jr.

William Orville DeWitt III (born March 8, 1968) is an American professional baseball executive who is the CEO of the St. Louis Cardinals of Major League Baseball (MLB) since 2026. He previously served as the team's president from 2008 to 2026. He is the son of Cardinals' team owner William DeWitt Jr. and the grandson of Bill DeWitt, who owned the St. Louis Browns and Cincinnati Reds and was a protégé of late Cardinal general manager Branch Rickey.

== Early life ==
DeWitt grew up in Cincinnati but moved to St. Louis when his father's ownership group purchased the Cardinals in 1996. He graduated from the Taft School (1986), earned an undergraduate degree from Yale (1990) and an MBA from Harvard Business School (1995). Between his undergraduate and master's degrees, DeWitt served as an assistant to William K. Reilly, a former Administrator of the Environmental Protection Agency.

== St. Louis Cardinals (1996–present) ==
Before his appointment as Cardinals' president, DeWitt joined the Cardinals and became the head of merchandising in 1996. He also gained experience in marketing and operational tasks. DeWitt helped develop Roger Dean Stadium, the Cardinals' spring training home in Jupiter, Florida, which opened in 1998. After becoming the team's senior vice president of business development, he led the design and construction of the Cardinals' ballpark, Busch Stadium, which opened in 2006.

DeWitt's predecessor, Mark Lamping, left in March 2008 to become the NFL's New York Giants president of New Meadowlands Stadium Company. DeWitt oversees the business operations of the Cardinals, including sales, marketing, finances, accounting, game-day productions, and other miscellaneous ventures. He also runs the development of Ballpark Village, a 100,000-square-foot retail development district next to Busch Stadium. In 2026, DeWitt became the Cardinals' chief executive officer.

DeWitt appeared in a 2006 episode of the ESPN Classic series Cheap Seats, filmed on location in St. Louis. Hosts Randy Sklar and Jason Sklar are natives of St. Louis.

== Personal life ==
DeWitt is married to Ira Aldanmaz DeWitt; the couple have two children, daughter Natalie and son William Orville IV. In his spare time, DeWitt plays golf and ice hockey. Mrs. DeWitt is from Canada and is of Armenian descent. Also a businesswoman, she is the owner of St. Louis-based Notifi Records, an urban contemporary record label whose artist roster has included Ginuwine, Johnny Gill, and Bos. She earned a Ph.D. in psychology and education from Saint Louis University in 1998.

== See also ==
- List of St. Louis Cardinals owners and executives

Sporting positions
Preceded by Mark Lamping	St. Louis Cardinals President; 2008–present	Succeeded by Incumbent
