= Stuart Meyer =

Stuart F. Meyer (October 23, 1933 – May 21, 2001) was a Major League Baseball executive. He served as president of the St. Louis Cardinals from 1992 to 1994. He has also worked for the Anheuser-Busch from 1959 to 1995. Meyer was a graduate of Saint Louis University.

Sporting positions
Preceded by Fred Kuhlman	St. Louis Cardinals President; 1992–94	Succeeded by Mark Lamping
