= List of St. Louis Cardinals seasons =

The St. Louis Cardinals, a professional baseball franchise based in St. Louis, Missouri, compete in the National League (NL) of Major League Baseball (MLB). Founded in 1882 as a charter member of the American Association (AA), the team was originally named the Brown Stockings before it was shortened to Browns the next season. The team moved to the National League in 1892 when the AA folded. The club changed its name to the Perfectos for one season in 1899 and adopted the Cardinals name in 1900. The St. Louis Cardinals are tied with the Cincinnati Reds and Pittsburgh Pirates as the third-oldest continuously operated baseball team.^{[a]} In that time, the team has won 19 National League pennants and 11 World Series championships (most in the National League and second only to the New York Yankees, who have won 27). They also won four American Association pennants and one pre-World Series championship that Major League Baseball does not consider official.

The Cardinals had six periods of continued success during their history. The first period occurred during the 1880s when the team won four consecutive American Association pennants from 1885–1888 while known as the Browns. The Cardinals next found success from 1926–1934 when they played in five World Series, winning three. During World War II the Cardinals won four NL pennants in five years from 1942–1946, including three World Series championships. During the 1960s the Cardinals won two World Series and played in another. In the 1980s the Cardinals played in three World Series, winning in 1982. Most recently, the Cardinals have made the playoffs nine times, winning seven NL Central titles and qualifying as a wild-card entrant in 2001, 2011 and 2012, winning the World Series in 2006 and 2011.

The only extended period of failure the Cardinals have experienced began when they joined the National League in 1892. The Cardinals played only five winning seasons in 30 years while finishing last seven times from their entrance to the NL until 1921. However, the Cardinals have remarkably avoided such failure since then as they have not finished in last place in the National League since 1918, by far the longest streak in the NL.^{[b]} Like the Yankees and Dodgers, the Cardinals have not lost 100 games in a season since World War I. The Cardinals failed to reach the World Series in the 1950s, 1970s, and 1990s, but were regularly a competitive team in each of these decades.

== Year by year ==
AA Champions (1882–1892) *	Pre-World Series Champions (1884–1891) †	World Series Champions (1903–present) ‡	NL Champions (1892–present)^{[c]} **	Division champions (1969–present) ^	Wild card berth (1994–present) ¤

Season	Level	League	Division	Finish^{[d]}	Wins^{[d]}	Losses^{[d]}	Win%	GB^{[e]}	Postseason	Awards
St. Louis Brown Stockings
1882	MLB	AA		5th	37	43	.463	18		
St. Louis Browns
1883	MLB	AA		2nd	65	33	.663	1		
1884	MLB	AA		4th	67	40	.626	8		
1885	MLB	AA *		1st	79	33	.705	—	Tied World Series (White Stockings) 3–3–1^{[f]} *	
1886	MLB †	AA *		1st	93	46	.669	—	Won World Series (White Stockings) 4–2 †	
1887	MLB	AA *		1st	95	40	.704	—	Lost World Series (Wolverines) 10–5 *	Tip O'Neill (TC)
1888	MLB	AA *		1st	92	43	.681	—	Lost World Series (Giants) 6–4 *	
1889	MLB	AA		2nd	90	45	.667	2		
1890	MLB	AA		3rd	78	58	.574	12		
1891	MLB	AA		2nd	85	51	.625	8½		
1892	MLB	NL		11th	56	94	.373	46		
1893^{[g]}	MLB	NL		10th	57	75	.432	30½		
1894	MLB	NL		9th	56	76	.424	34		
1895	MLB	NL		11th	39	92	.298	48½		
1896	MLB	NL		11th	40	90	.308	50½		
1897	MLB	NL		12th	29	102	.221	63½		
1898	MLB	NL		12th	39	111	.260	63½		
St. Louis Perfectos
1899	MLB	NL		5th	84	67	.556	18½		
St. Louis Cardinals
1900	MLB	NL		5th	65	75	.464	19		
1901	MLB	NL		4th	76	64	.543	14½		
1902	MLB	NL		6th	56	78	.418	44½		
1903	MLB	NL		8th	43	94	.314	46½		
1904	MLB	NL		5th	75	79	.487	31½		
1905	MLB	NL		6th	58	96	.377	47		
1906	MLB	NL		7th	52	98	.347	63		
1907	MLB	NL		8th	52	101	.340	55½		
1908	MLB	NL		8th	49	105	.318	50		
1909	MLB	NL		7th	54	98	.355	56		
1910	MLB	NL		7th	63	90	.412	40½		
1911	MLB	NL		5th	75	74	.503	22		
1912	MLB	NL		6th	63	90	.412	41		
1913	MLB	NL		8th	51	99	.340	49		
1914	MLB	NL		3rd	81	72	.529	13		
1915	MLB	NL		6th	72	81	.471	18½		
1916	MLB	NL		7th	60	93	.392	33½		
1917	MLB	NL		3rd	82	70	.539	15		
1918	MLB	NL		8th	51	78	.395	33		
1919	MLB	NL		7th	54	83	.394	40½		
1920^{[h]}	MLB	NL		5th	75	79	.487	18		
1921	MLB	NL		3rd	87	66	.569	7		
1922	MLB	NL		3rd	85	69	.552	8		Rogers Hornsby (TC)
1923	MLB	NL		5th	79	74	.516	16		
1924	MLB	NL		6th	65	89	.422	28½		
1925	MLB	NL		4th	77	76	.503	18		Rogers Hornsby (MVP, TC)
1926	MLB ‡	NL **		1st	89	65	.578	—	Won World Series (Yankees) 4–3 ‡	Bob O'Farrell (MVP)
1927	MLB	NL		2nd	92	61	.601	1½		
1928	MLB	NL **		1st	95	59	.617	—	Lost World Series (Yankees) 4–0 **	Jim Bottomley (MVP)
1929	MLB	NL		4th	78	74	.513	20		
1930	MLB	NL **		1st	92	62	.597	—	Lost World Series (Athletics) 4–2 **	
1931	MLB ‡	NL **		1st	101	53	.656	—	Won World Series (Athletics) 4–3 ‡	Frankie Frisch (MVP)
1932	MLB	NL		6th	72	82	.468	18		
1933	MLB	NL		5th	82	71	.536	9½		
1934	MLB ‡	NL **		1st	95	58	.621	—	Won World Series (Tigers) 4–3 ‡	Dizzy Dean (MVP)
1935	MLB	NL		2nd	96	58	.623	4		
1936	MLB	NL		2nd	87	67	.565	5		
1937	MLB	NL		4th	81	73	.526	15		Joe Medwick (MVP, TC)
1938	MLB	NL		6th	71	80	.470	17½		
1939	MLB	NL		2nd	92	61	.601	4½		
1940	MLB	NL		3rd	84	69	.549	16		
1941	MLB	NL		2nd	97	56	.634	2½		
1942	MLB ‡	NL **		1st	106	48	.688	—	Won World Series (Yankees) 4–1 ‡	Mort Cooper (MVP)
1943	MLB	NL **		1st	105	49	.682	—	Lost World Series (Yankees) 4–1 **	Stan Musial (MVP)
1944	MLB ‡	NL **		1st	105	49	.682	—	Won World Series (Browns) 4–2^{[i]} ‡	Marty Marion (MVP)
1945	MLB	NL		2nd	95	59	.617	3		
1946	MLB ‡	NL **		1st^{[j]}	98	58	.628	—	Won World Series (Red Sox) 4–3^{[k]} ‡	Stan Musial (MVP)
1947	MLB	NL		2nd	89	65	.578	5		
1948	MLB	NL		2nd	85	69	.552	6½		Stan Musial (MVP)
1949	MLB	NL		2nd	96	58	.623	1		
1950	MLB	NL		5th	78	75	.510	12½		
1951	MLB	NL		3rd	81	73	.526	15½		
1952	MLB	NL		3rd	88	66	.571	8½		
1953^{[l]}	MLB	NL		4th	83	71	.539	22		
1954	MLB	NL		6th	72	82	.468	25		Wally Moon (ROY)
1955	MLB	NL		7th	68	86	.442	30½		Bill Virdon (ROY)
1956	MLB	NL		4th	76	78	.494	17		
1957	MLB	NL		2nd	87	67	.565	8		
1958	MLB	NL		5th	72	82	.468	20		
1959	MLB	NL		7th	71	83	.461	16		
1960	MLB	NL		3rd	86	68	.558	9		
1961	MLB	NL		5th	80	74	.519	13		
1962	MLB	NL		6th	84	78	.519	17½		
1963	MLB	NL		2nd	93	69	.574	6		
1964	MLB ‡	NL **		1st	93	69	.574	—	Won World Series (Yankees) 4–3 ‡	Ken Boyer (MVP); Bob Gibson (WS MVP)
1965	MLB	NL		7th	80	81	.497	16½		
1966^{[n]}	MLB	NL		6th	83	79	.512	12		
1967	MLB ‡	NL **		1st	101	60	.627	—	Won World Series (Red Sox) 4–3 ‡	Orlando Cepeda (MVP); Bob Gibson (WS MVP)
1968	MLB	NL **		1st	97	65	.599	—	Lost World Series (Tigers) 4–3 **	Bob Gibson (MVP, CYA)
1969	MLB	NL	East^{[o]}	4th	87	75	.537	13		
1970	MLB	NL	East	4th	76	86	.469	13		Bob Gibson (CYA)
1971	MLB	NL	East	2nd	90	72	.556	7		Joe Torre (MVP)
1972	MLB	NL	East	4th	75	81	.481	21½		
1973	MLB	NL	East	2nd	81	81	.500	1½		
1974	MLB	NL	East	2nd	86	75	.534	1½		Bake McBride (ROY)
1975	MLB	NL	East	4th	82	80	.506	10½		
1976	MLB	NL	East	5th	72	90	.444	29		
1977	MLB	NL	East	3rd	83	79	.512	18		
1978	MLB	NL	East	5th	69	93	.426	21		
1979	MLB	NL	East	3rd	86	76	.531	12		Keith Hernandez (MVP)
1980	MLB	NL	East	4th	74	88	.457	17		
1981	MLB	NL	East	2nd	30	20	.600	1½		
1981	MLB	NL	East	2nd	29	23	.558	½		
1982	MLB ‡	NL **	East ^	1st	92	70	.568	—	Won NLCS (Braves) 3–0; Won World Series (Brewers) 4–3 ‡	Darrell Porter (WS MVP)
1983	MLB	NL	East	4th	79	83	.488	11		
1984	MLB	NL	East	3rd	84	78	.519	12½		
1985	MLB	NL **	East ^	1st	101	61	.623	—	Won NLCS (Dodgers) 4–2; Lost World Series (Royals) 4–3^{[r]} **	Willie McGee (MVP); Vince Coleman (ROY); Whitey Herzog (MOY)
1986	MLB	NL	East	3rd	79	82	.491	28½		Todd Worrell (ROY)
1987	MLB	NL **	East ^	1st	95	67	.586	—	Won NLCS (Giants) 4–3; Lost World Series (Twins) 4–3 **	
1988	MLB	NL	East	5th	76	86	.469	25		
1989	MLB	NL	East	3rd	86	76	.531	7		
1990	MLB	NL	East	6th	70	92	.432	25		
1991	MLB	NL	East	2nd	84	78	.519	14		
1992	MLB	NL	East	3rd	83	79	.512	13		
1993	MLB	NL	East	3rd	87	75	.537	10		
1994	MLB	NL	Central^{[t]}	3rd	53	61	.465	13	Playoffs cancelled^{[s]}	
1995	MLB	NL	Central	4th	62	81	.434	22½		
1996	MLB	NL	Central ^	1st	88	74	.543	—	Won NLDS (Padres) 3–0; Lost NLCS (Braves) 4–3	
1997	MLB	NL	Central	4th	73	89	.451	11		
1998	MLB	NL	Central	3rd	83	79	.512	19		
1999	MLB	NL	Central	4th	75	86	.466	21½		
2000	MLB	NL	Central ^	1st	95	67	.586	—	Won NLDS (Braves) 3–0; Lost NLCS (Mets) 4–1	
2001	MLB	NL	Central	1st^{[u]} ¤	93	69	.574	—	Lost NLDS (Diamondbacks) 3–2	Albert Pujols (ROY)
2002	MLB	NL	Central ^	1st	97	65	.599	—	Won NLDS (Diamondbacks) 3–0; Lost NLCS (Giants) 4–1	Tony La Russa (MOY)
2003	MLB	NL	Central	3rd	85	77	.525	3		
2004	MLB	NL **	Central ^	1st	105	57	.648	—	Won NLDS (Dodgers) 3–1; Won NLCS (Astros) 4–3; Lost World Series (Red Sox) 4–0 **	
2005	MLB	NL	Central ^	1st	100	62	.617	—	Won NLDS (Padres) 3–0; Lost NLCS (Astros) 4–2	Albert Pujols (MVP); Chris Carpenter (CYA)
2006^{[v]}	MLB ‡	NL **	Central ^	1st	83	78	.516	—	Won NLDS (Padres) 3–1; Won NLCS (Mets) 4–3; Won World Series (Tigers) 4–1 ‡	David Eckstein (WS MVP)
2007	MLB	NL	Central	3rd	78	84	.481	7		
2008	MLB	NL	Central	4th	86	76	.531	11½		Albert Pujols (MVP)
2009	MLB	NL	Central ^	1st	91	71	.562	—	Lost NLDS (Dodgers) 3–0	Albert Pujols (MVP)
2010	MLB	NL	Central	2nd	86	76	.531	6		
2011	MLB ‡	NL **	Central	2nd ¤	90	72	.556	6	Won NLDS (Phillies) 3–2; Won NLCS (Brewers) 4–2; Won World Series (Rangers) 4–3 ‡	David Freese (WS MVP)
2012	MLB	NL	Central	2nd ¤	88	74	.543	9	Won NLWC (Braves); Won NLDS (Nationals) 3–2; Lost NLCS (Giants) 4–3	
2013	MLB	NL **	Central ^	1st	97	65	.599	—	Won NLDS (Pirates) 3–2; Won NLCS (Dodgers) 4–2; Lost World Series (Red Sox) 4–2 **	
2014	MLB	NL	Central ^	1st	90	72	.556	—	Won NLDS (Dodgers) 3–1; Lost NLCS (Giants) 4–1	
2015	MLB	NL	Central ^	1st	100	62	.617	—	Lost NLDS (Cubs) 3–1	
2016	MLB	NL	Central	2nd	86	76	.531	17½		
2017	MLB	NL	Central	3rd	83	79	.512	9		
2018	MLB	NL	Central	3rd	88	74	.543	7½		
2019	MLB	NL	Central ^	1st	91	71	.562	—	Won NLDS (Braves) 3–2; Lost NLCS (Nationals) 4–0	Mike Shildt (MOY)
2020	MLB	NL	Central	2nd ¤	30	28	.517	3	Lost NLWC (Padres) 2–1	
2021	MLB	NL	Central	2nd ¤	90	72	.556	5	Lost NLWC (Dodgers)	
2022	MLB	NL	Central ^	1st	93	69	.574	—	Lost NLWC (Phillies) 2–0	Paul Goldschmidt (MVP)
2023	MLB	NL	Central	5th	71	91	.438	21		
2024	MLB	NL	Central	2nd	83	79	.512	10		
2025	MLB	NL	Central	4th	78	84	.481	19		
2026	MLB	NL	Central	5th	77	85	.475	26		

== All-time records ==
Totals	Wins	Losses	Win %	
Totals	781	432	.644	American Association regular season record (1882–1891)
Totals	16	21	.432	American Association post-season record (1882–1891)
Totals	10,660	10,139	.513	National League regular season record (1892–2026)^{[z]}
Totals	134	128	.511	MLB post-season record (1892–2026)
Totals	11,441	10,571	.520	All-time regular season record (1882–2026)
Totals	150	149	.502	All-time post-season record (1882–2026)
Totals	11,591	10,720	.520	All-time regular and post-season record (1882–2026)

== Record by decade ==
The following table describes the Cardinals' regular season MLB win–loss record by decade.

Decade	Wins	Losses	Pct
1880s	618	323	.657
1890s	563	816	.408
1900s	580	888	.395
1910s	652	830	.440
1920s	822	712	.536
1930s	869	665	.566
1940s	960	580	.623
1950s	776	763	.504
1960s	884	718	.552
1970s	800	813	.496
1980s	825	734	.529
1990s	758	794	.488
2000s	913	706	.564
2010s	899	721	.555
2020s	522	508	.507
All-time	11,441	10,571	.520

These statistics are from Baseball-Reference.com's St. Louis Cardinals History & Encyclopedia, and are current through the 2026 season.

== Postseason record by year ==
The Cardinals have made the postseason thirty-two times in their history, with the first being in 1926 and the most recent being in 2022.

Postseason record by year
Year	Finish	Round	Opponent	Result		
1926	World Series Champions	World Series	New York Yankees	Won	4	3
1928	National League Champions	World Series	New York Yankees	Lost	0	4
1930	National League Champions	World Series	Philadelphia Athletics	Lost	2	4
1931	World Series Champions	World Series	Philadelphia Athletics	Won	4	3
1934	World Series Champions	World Series	Detroit Tigers	Won	4	3
1942	World Series Champions	World Series	New York Yankees	Won	4	1
1943	National League Champions	World Series	New York Yankees	Lost	1	4
1944	World Series Champions	World Series	St Louis Browns	Won	4	2
1946	World Series Champions	World Series	Boston Red Sox	Won	4	3
1964	World Series Champions	World Series	New York Yankees	Won	4	3
1967	World Series Champions	World Series	Boston Red Sox	Won	4	3
1968	National League Champions	World Series	Detroit Tigers	Lost	3	4
1982	World Series Champions	NLCS	Atlanta Braves	Won	3	0
1982	World Series Champions	World Series	Milwaukee Brewers	Won	4	3
1985	National League Champions	NLCS	Los Angeles Dodgers	Won	4	2
1985	National League Champions	World Series	Kansas City Royals	Lost	3	4
1987	National League Champions	NLCS	San Francisco Giants	Won	4	3
1987	National League Champions	World Series	Minnesota Twins	Lost	3	4
1996	National League Central Champions	NLDS	San Diego Padres	Won	3	0
1996	National League Central Champions	NLCS	Atlanta Braves	Lost	3	4
2000	National League Central Champions	NLDS	Atlanta Braves	Won	3	0
2000	National League Central Champions	NLCS	New York Mets	Lost	1	4
2001	National League Wild Card	NLDS	Arizona Diamondbacks	Lost	2	3
2002	National League Central Champions	NLDS	Arizona Diamondbacks	Won	3	0
2002	National League Central Champions	NLCS	San Francisco Giants	Lost	1	4
2004	National League Champions	NLDS	Los Angeles Dodgers	Won	3	1
2004	National League Champions	NLCS	Houston Astros	Won	4	3
2004	National League Champions	World Series	Boston Red Sox	Lost	0	4
2005	National League Central Champions	NLDS	San Diego Padres	Won	3	0
2005	National League Central Champions	NLCS	Houston Astros	Lost	2	4
2006	World Series Champions	NLDS	San Diego Padres	Won	3	1
2006	World Series Champions	NLCS	New York Mets	Won	4	3
2006	World Series Champions	World Series	Detroit Tigers	Won	4	1
2009	National League Central Champions	NLDS	Los Angeles Dodgers	Lost	0	3
2011	World Series Champions	NLDS	Philadelphia Phillies	Won	3	2
2011	World Series Champions	NLCS	Milwaukee Brewers	Won	4	2
2011	World Series Champions	World Series	Texas Rangers	Won	4	3
2012	National League Wild Card	NLWC	Atlanta Braves	Won	1	0
2012	National League Wild Card	NLDS	Washington Nationals	Won	3	2
2012	National League Wild Card	NLCS	San Francisco Giants	Lost	3	4
2013	National League Champions	NLDS	Pittsburgh Pirates	Won	3	2
2013	National League Champions	NLCS	Los Angeles Dodgers	Won	4	2
2013	National League Champions	World Series	Boston Red Sox	Lost	2	4
2014	National League Central Champions	NLDS	Los Angeles Dodgers	Won	3	1
2014	National League Central Champions	NLCS	San Francisco Giants	Lost	1	4
2015	National League Central Champions	NLDS	Chicago Cubs	Lost	1	3
2019	National League Central Champions	NLDS	Atlanta Braves	Won	3	2
2019	National League Central Champions	NLCS	Washington Nationals	Lost	0	4
2020	National League Wild Card	NLWC	San Diego Padres	Lost	1	2
2021	National League Wild Card	NLWC	Los Angeles Dodgers	Lost	0	1
2022	National League Central Champions	NLWC	Philadelphia Phillies	Lost	0	2
32	Totals			30-21	134	128

== Footnotes ==
- ^{a} The current variations of the Cardinals, Reds, and Pirates all began playing in 1882. The two older clubs are the Atlanta Braves, who were founded in 1871 in Boston, and the Chicago Cubs, who have played continuously since 1874.
- ^{b} The Cardinals did finish in last place of the NL East in 1990. However, the Atlanta Braves of the NL West had a worse record. The next longest streak is by the Cincinnati Reds, who most recently finished in last place of the NL in 1982. The similar streak in the American League is held by the Boston Red Sox, who last finished in last place of the AL in 1932.
- ^{c} For lists of all National League pennant winners see National League pennant winners 1876–1900, National League pennant winners 1901-68, and National League Championship Series.
- ^{d} The Finish, Wins, and Losses columns list regular season results and exclude any postseason play. Regular and postseason records are combined only at the bottom of the list.
- ^{e} The GB column lists "Games Back" from the team that finished in first place that season. It is determined by finding the difference in wins plus the difference in losses divided by two.
- ^{f} The dispute in 1885 concerned Game 2, which was forfeited by St. Louis when they pulled their team off the field protesting an umpiring decision. The managers, Cap Anson and Charles Comiskey, initially agreed to disregard the game. When St. Louis won the final game and an apparent 3–2 Series championship, Chicago White Stockings owner Albert Spalding overruled his manager and declared that he wanted the forfeit counted. The result of a tied Series was that neither team got the prize money that had been posted by the owners before the Series (and was returned to them after they both agreed it was a tie).
- ^{g} The Cardinals moved from their original home, Sportsman's Park, to a new field called New Sportsman's Park where they played until 1920. The ballpark would later be named League Park and then Robision Field under different Cardinals ownership.
- ^{h} During the season the Cardinals moved from Robison Field, where they had played since 1893, to become tenants of the St. Louis Browns at Sportsman's Park. The Cardinals had originally played at Sportsman's Park from 1882 to 1892.
- ^{i} The 1944 World Series was nicknamed the "Streetcar Series" and featured the NL Cardinals against the AL St. Louis Browns. Every game during the series was played at Sportsman's Park in St. Louis.
- ^{j} The Cardinals finished the 1946 regular season tied for first place in the National League with the Brooklyn Dodgers. However, the Cardinals claimed the pennant by winning the first two games in a best-of-three playoff series.
- ^{k} The 1946 World Series is best remembered for Enos Slaughter's Mad Dash to score the go-ahead run in the 8th inning of Game 7.
- ^{l} In 1953 the Cardinals were bought by Anheuser-Busch and Gussie Busch became team president, which he would remain until his death in 1989. Busch then purchased Sportsman's Park from the rival St. Louis Browns and renamed it Busch Stadium. The Browns would leave St. Louis after the season for Baltimore, Maryland.
- ^{m} In 1962 the National League increased the schedule from 154 games, which had been established since 1904, to 162 games, where it remains today.
- ^{n} During the season the Cardinals moved from Busch Stadium I, where they had played since 1920 to Busch Memorial Stadium.
- ^{o} In 1969 MLB expanded by 4 teams to 12 in each league and split each league into an East and West division, the Cardinals were placed in the National League East.
- ^{p} The 1972 Major League Baseball strike forced the cancellation of the first seven games (thirteen game-days) of the season.
- ^{q} The 1981 season was shortened by a player's strike. MLB decided to split the season into two halves with the division winner of each half playing in a Divisional Round of the playoffs. The Cardinals finished with the best overall record in the NL East at 59–43, but they finished in second place in both halves of the season and did not make the playoffs.
- ^{r} The 1985 World Series, nicknamed the "Show-Me Series" or "I-70 Series" because it featured two Missouri teams in St. Louis and the Kansas City Royals, is most remembered for The Call in Game 6. With the Cardinals leading the series 3–2 and Game 6 1–0, they took the field in the 9th inning to claim the championship. Pitcher Todd Worrell faced the Royals Jorge Orta first, Orta hit a slow ground ball to first baseman Jack Clark, who flipped the ball to Worrell at first for the apparent out. However, umpire Don Denkinger called Orta safe and the Cardinals unraveled to lose Game 6 and got blown out in Game 7.
- ^{s} The 1994–95 Major League Baseball strike ended the season on August 11 and caused the entire postseason to be cancelled.
- ^{t} In 1994 MLB split each league into 3 divisions. The Cardinals were placed in the newly created National League Central.
- ^{u} In 2001 the Cardinals and the Houston Astros tied for first place in the NL Central. Since both teams were assured of a place in the playoffs, MLB declared it a shared championship. Houston was granted the NL Central's position in the playoff bracket by way of a better head-to-head record and St. Louis was given the Wild Card spot.
- ^{v} The Cardinals began play in the new Busch Stadium in 2006 after 40 years at Busch Memorial Stadium. They became the first team since the 1923 New York Yankees to win the World Series in their first season in a ballpark.
- ^{z} Major League Baseball considers this to be the Cardinals' official all-time record. MLB does not count the years played in the American Association or post-season games towards the official record.

== Related lists ==
- List of St. Louis Cardinals managers
- List of St. Louis Cardinals coaches
