= Harry Diddlebock =

American sportswriter and baseball manager

- Manager
- Born: June 27, 1854; Philadelphia, Pennsylvania, U.S.
- Died: February 5, 1900 (aged 45); Philadelphia, Pennsylvania, U.S.
- Batted: Unknown Threw: Unknown

MLB statistics
- Games managed: 17
- Managerial record: 7–10
- Winning percentage: .412

Teams
- St. Louis Browns (1896)

Henry Harrison Diddlebock (June 27, 1854 – February 5, 1900) was an American sportswriter and Major League Baseball manager. Formerly a head sportswriter for two Philadelphia newspapers, Diddlebock managed 17 games with the St. Louis Browns in the 1896 season. He had a 7–10 record (a .412 winning percentage).

== Early career ==
Prior to assuming the managerial job with the Browns, Diddlebock had never played or managed in the major leagues. He was the head sportswriter for The Philadelphia Times for eleven years and held the same position at The Philadelphia Inquirer for six years. He was the longtime president of an organization known as the Scorer's Association, and he was a horse racing official. He also covered the famed 1892 fight between boxers John L. Sullivan and James J. Corbett.

Within baseball, Diddlebock variously served as president, secretary and treasurer for the Eastern League, a minor league that served as one of the precursors to the International League. He later held financial interest in a team in the Pennsylvania State League, which became a rival of the Eastern League.

== Managerial stint ==
In December 1895, he was hired as the manager of the St. Louis Browns for the 1896 season by the team's owner, Chris von der Ahe. The Browns and their owner were held in low regard at the time. Sportswriter Alfred Henry Spink wrote that "Mr. Diddlebock's mission will be to repair the damage Von der Ahe has done the game and the St. Louis club." Newspapers in St. Louis were initially supportive of Diddlebock, but before he took the field, the team was embroiled in controversy when it was announced that they would spend $30,000 to bring in five star players from Philadelphia. The Browns did not have the money to finance such a deal, and von der Ahe blamed Diddlebock for the story that had gotten out.

Sources differ as to the exact sequence of events that led to Diddlebock's firing as manager. At least one source notes that Diddlebock came to the ballpark with bruising and swelling about his face, claiming to have been attacked by a band of six men. The source says he was sent home by von der Ahe and that a private detective found he had fallen asleep at a drinking establishment and sustained a fall off of a barstool. Another version holds that Diddlebock had been found by police officers on the streets very early one morning and that it was discovered that he took a drunken fall off of a streetcar. In either case, von der Ahe fired Diddlebock three weeks into his only season as manager. Diddlebock finished the stint with a 7–10 win–loss record.

== Later life ==
After his time as manager, Diddlebock returned to the staff of the Inquirer to write about horse racing. In early 1900, he developed what was thought to be a bad cold. He was later diagnosed with erysipelas. The infection affected Diddlebock's heart and he died on February 5, 1900. (Note: Some sources list the underlying cause of death as "muscular rheumatism".) Diddlebock was survived by his two sons; his wife had died two years earlier. He is buried in West Laurel Hill Cemetery in Bala Cynwyd, Pennsylvania.

== See also ==
- List of St. Louis Cardinals managers
