= Fred Saigh =

American lawyer and investor

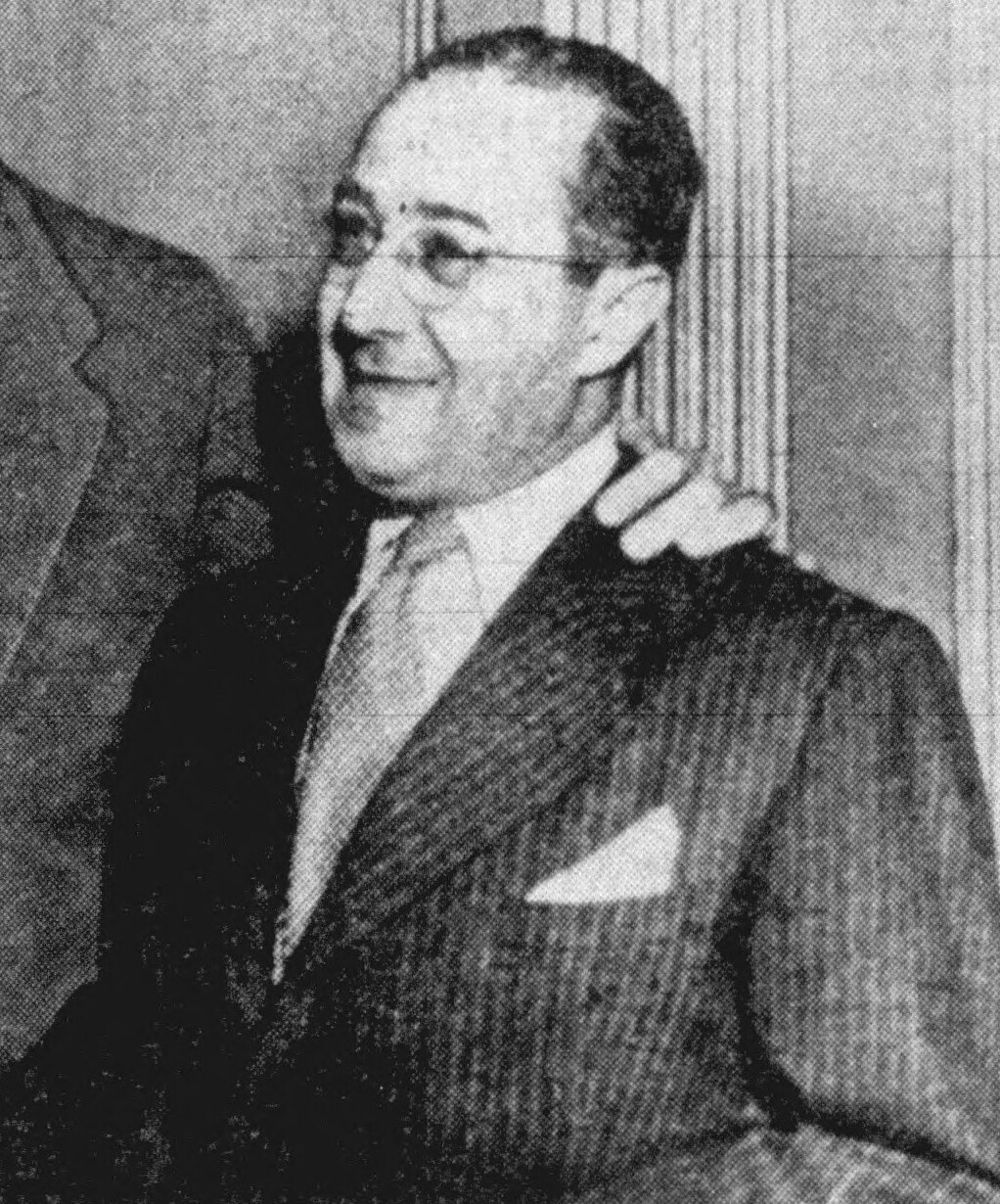
Saigh in 1950

Frederick Michael Saigh Jr. (pronounced "sigh") (1905–1999) was a lawyer, real estate investor, and owner of the St. Louis Cardinals of Major League Baseball (MLB) from 1948 through 1953.

== Early life ==
Saigh was born in Springfield, Illinois, and grew up in Kewanee, Illinois. The son of Lebanese immigrants who owned a chain of grocery stores, Saigh was the oldest of five children. He attended Bradley University in Peoria, Illinois, graduated from Northwestern University with a law degree in 1926 at age 21, and became a highly successful tax and corporate lawyer and investor in St. Louis. He apprenticed in a law office and earned his license in 1928.

== Early business ventures ==
One of Fred Saigh's early ventures was a company that operated cigarette machines, but that went bankrupt. In the 1940s, he owned prime office buildings in downtown St. Louis. The buildings were two famous landmarks, the Railway Exchange Building, which headquartered The Famous-Barr Co. retail chain, and Scruggs-Vandervoort-Barney building.

== St. Louis Cardinals (1947–53) ==
At the end of the 1947 baseball season, Saigh got wind that longtime Cardinals owner Sam Breadon wanted to sell. Breadon faced two problems. He was ill with prostate cancer, and he had been unable to find land on which to build a planned new ballpark. The Cardinals had rented Sportsman's Park from the city's other major league team, the American League Browns, since 1920. Although they had long since surpassed the Browns as the city's most popular team, Breadon wanted to build a park of his own. He had set aside $5 million to build a park and was facing the end of a five-year deadline to build it before having to pay taxes on that money. Saigh persuaded Breadon to sell the Cardinals to him, with the assurance that he wouldn't have to pay taxes on his $5 million fund. To further put him at ease, Saigh brought in Robert Hannegan as a minority partner. Hannegan was a prominent St. Louis businessman, former United States Postmaster General, and confidante of President Harry S. Truman. The $4 million deal closed in late 1947.

Saigh inherited a team in transition. The Cardinals, though then just one year removed from their ninth National League pennant and sixth World Series championship since 1926, had begun to decay as an organization. Five years before, Breadon had forced out legendary general manager Branch Rickey, who had quickly resurfaced with the Brooklyn Dodgers. Meanwhile, the Browns, under new owner Bill Veeck, began a concerted effort to drive the Cardinals out of town.

In January, 1949, Hannegan, suffering from poor health, sold his share of the team to Saigh. Hannegan died that October of heart disease. As sole owner, Saigh's notable actions included leading other baseball owners to oust (by not renewing his contract) Commissioner of Baseball Happy Chandler in December, 1950 and proposing revenue-sharing of local television revenues.

However, the tax dodge Saigh used soon came to light, as well as other questionable practices on his part. In April 1952, Saigh was indicted on federal charges of evading $49,260 in income taxes between 1946 and 1949. In January 1953, he pleaded no contest to two counts involving more than $19,000 in tax underpayments, and was sentenced to 15 months in prison. He served six months at the federal penitentiary in Terre Haute, Indiana, leaving in November 1953 when he was given parole for good behavior.

In February 1953, under pressure from Commissioner Ford Frick, Saigh put the Cardinals up for sale. Saigh would have almost certainly been thrown out of baseball if he hadn't sold the team. For a time, no credible offers surfaced from St. Louis interests, making it seem likely that the team would be purchased by someone who could potentially move the Cardinals elsewhere. The most promising offer came from a consortium of businessmen in Houston, Texas. The Cardinals owned the Houston Buffaloes of the Texas League; under major-league rules of the time, that meant they also held the major-league rights to Houston. The only question was whether Houston's Buffalo Stadium could be upgraded to major-league standards.

However, just before he was due to reach a final agreement with the Houston group, Saigh sold the Cardinals to Anheuser-Busch, the St. Louis-based brewery, even though Anheuser-Busch's offer was far less ($3.75 million) than what out-of-town suitors had on the table. It has long been claimed that Anheuser-Busch president Gussie Busch persuaded Saigh that civic pride was more important than money. In truth, according to Anheuser-Busch historian William Knoedelseder, Saigh had preferred from the beginning to sell to a local buyer, and was willing to accept any credible offer from interests who would keep the team in St. Louis. What is beyond dispute is that Anheuser-Busch's purchase all but assured that the Cardinals would stay in St. Louis. It also effectively spelled the end for the Browns, as Veeck concluded that he could not even begin to compete with Anheuser-Busch's resources. He ceded St. Louis to the Cardinals and made plans to move the Browns. As a preliminary step, Veeck sold Sportsman's Park to the Cardinals soon after Anheuser-Busch took over. With their remaining leverage gone, it was the Browns who left town by the end of the season, becoming the Baltimore Orioles.

== Post-Cardinals years ==
After his release from prison, Saigh resumed his career in private business, amassing a large amount of stock in Anheuser-Busch — becoming the largest shareholder outside the Busch family itself. However, he was routinely critical of Busch, claiming the team was "demoralized." Saigh wrote an open letter dated August 20, 1964, three weeks before the Cardinals made their improbable comeback to overtake the Philadelphia Phillies and win the World Series. He died in Chesterfield, Missouri, on December 29, 1999, at the age of 94, worth approximately $500 million.

== Personal life ==
Saigh and his wife Elizabeth had no children. He left $70 million to charity in his will, establishing the Fred Saigh Foundation.
