= Mark Lamping =

American sports executive

- Education: Rockhurst University
- Occupation: Team President of the Jacksonville Jaguars (NFL)
- Spouse: Cheryl

Mark Lamping is the current team president of the Jacksonville Jaguars. He was formerly CEO of the MetLife Stadium. Prior to his stint in New York, he was president of the St. Louis Cardinals Major League Baseball team, a post he held from September 1, 1994, until March 13, 2008. Lamping is now a non-executive director of English association football team Fulham, which is owned by Jaguars owner Shahid Khan.

== Life and career ==
This baseball team was an important part of my summers. And to be given the chance to serve as the team president well, that’s too big of a dream for somebody like me to have.

— Mark Lamping comments on leaving the St. Louis Cardinals

A graduate of St. John Vianney High School in the St. Louis area, Lamping was a prominent sports-marketing executive at Anheuser-Busch before his job with the Cardinals. On Thursday, March 13, 2008, he resigned as president of the Cardinals to become chief executive officer of the New Meadowlands Stadium Company, where he oversaw the opening of The "Meadowlands," the new New York Giants and New York Jets football stadium. Lamping is a graduate of Rockhurst University in Kansas City, MO where he was a member of the Sigma Alpha Epsilon fraternity.

== Notes and references ==
Sporting positions
Preceded by Stuart Meyer	St. Louis Cardinals President; 1994–2008	Succeeded by Bill DeWitt III
