= Robison Field =

Former baseball park in St. Louis, Missouri, U.S.

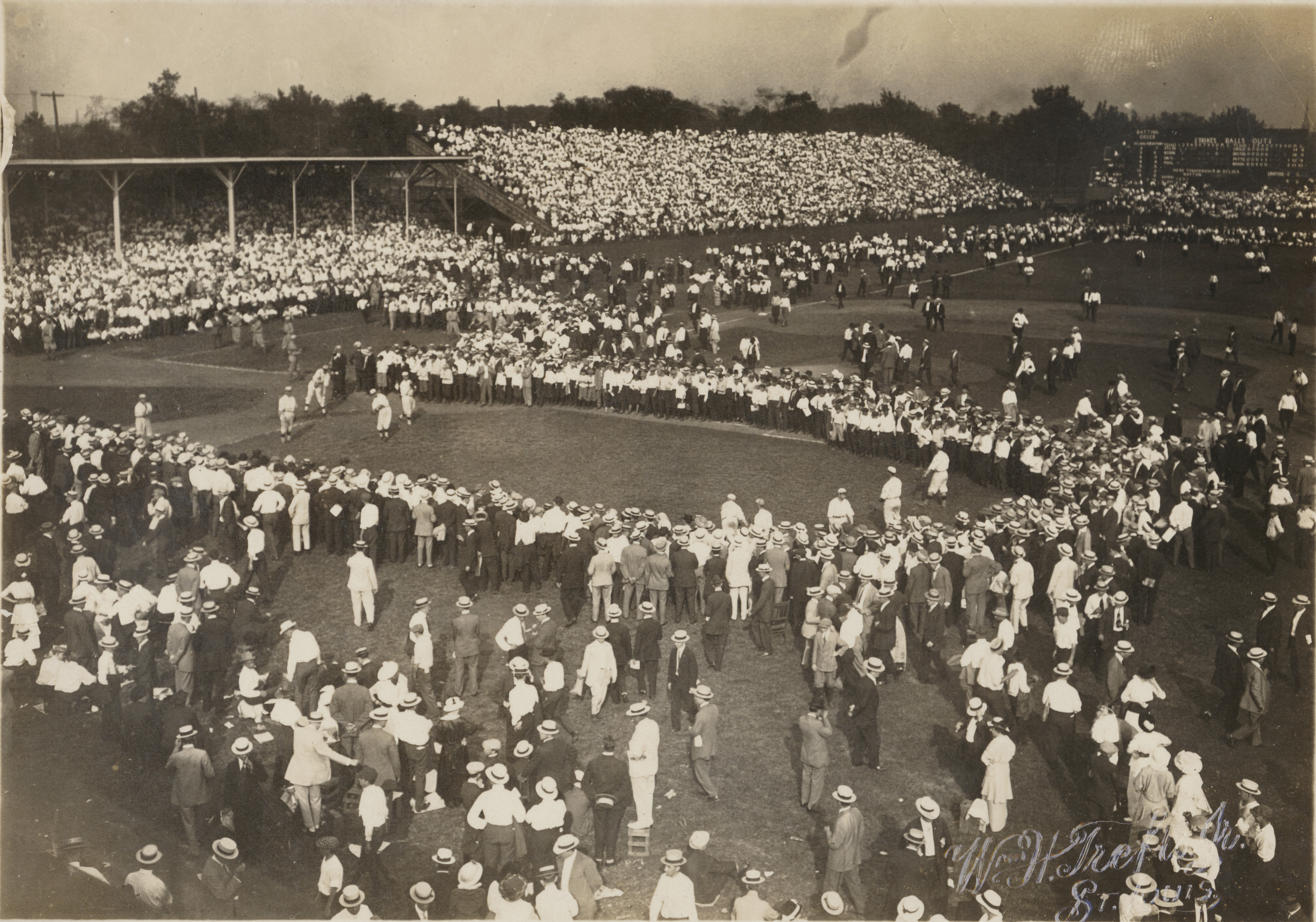
- Crowd gathered around St. Louis Cardinals baseball players between games of doubleheader vs. NY Giants at Robison Field, Aug 26, 1914.
- Interactive map of Robison Field
- Former names: New Sportsman's Park (1893–1899) (aka Union Park); League Park (1899–1911); Cardinal Field (1917–1920)
- Location: Natural Bridge Avenue and Vandeventer Avenue, St. Louis, Missouri
- Coordinates: 38°39′46″N 90°13′20″W
- Capacity: 14,500 (1893); 15,200 (1899); 21,000 (1909)
- Surface: Grass
- Field size: Left Field - 470 ft (1893), 380 ft (1909); Left-Center - 520 ft (1893), 400 ft (1909); Center Field - 500 ft (1893), 435 ft (1909); Right-Center - 330 ft (1893), 320 ft (1909); Right Field - 290 ft (1893); Backstop - 120 ft (1893)

Construction
- Opened: April 27, 1893; 133 years ago
- Closed: June 6, 1920; 106 years ago
- Demolished: before 1926; 100 years ago

Tenants
- St. Louis Browns/Perfectos/Cardinals (MLB) (1893–1920); Columbus Club (St Louis Soccer League) (1913–15)

Robison Field is the best-known of several names given to a former Major League Baseball park in St. Louis, Missouri. It was the home of the St. Louis Cardinals of the National League from April 27, 1893 until June 6, 1920.

== History ==
Today's Cardinals of the National League began in 1882, as the St. Louis Browns of the then-major American Association. They won four championships during the Association's ten-year existence of 1882 through 1891. During that decade, the team was playing their home games at Sportsman's Park, at the corner of Grand and Dodier. In 1892, four of the Association clubs were absorbed into the National League, and the Association folded. Sportsman's Park remained the home of the Browns during their first NL season.

=== New Sportsman's Park ===
Although the Browns had been the most successful of the Association clubs, they fell on hard times for some years after the merger. For 1893, owner Chris von der Ahe moved his team a few blocks to the northwest and opened a "New" Sportsman's Park, on the southeast corner of Natural Bridge and Vandeventer. The move to this particular site was part of a "deal", as the property had been owned by a trolley company, who then ran a trolley line out near the ballpark. The diamond was in the northwest corner of the block. Prairie Avenue was the east (left field) border. Right field, the shorter of the outfields, was bordered by Lexington Avenue.

Along with the basic stands, Von der Ahe had built an adjoining amusement park, a beer garden, a race track in the outfield, a "shoot-the-shoots" water flume ride, and an artificial lake (used for ice skating in winter). The side show notwithstanding, the club performed poorly on the field for most of the 1890s, consistently finishing at or near last place in the 12-team league as Von der Ahe sold off his best players in order to keep the club solvent.

On April 16, 1898, a fire ignited by a dropped and still-burning cigar consumed the grandstands and other structures. An overnight effort was made to construct some temporary seating, and the game scheduled for the 17th was played. Von der Ahe was able to secure financing to rebuild the permanent stands, albeit in a much more modest design than before.

=== League Park ===
In 1899, Von der Ahe sold the Browns to Frank and Stanley Robison. By then the ballpark was no longer the "New" Sportsman's Park. During the Robison's tenure, the venue was simply called League Park. It would bear that name through the 1910 season.

The Robison brothers sought to change the image and reverse the fortunes of their team. They dropped the old "Browns" identity, abandoning that team color and switching to Cardinal red. This would yield a new and lasting nickname. However, for 1899 they are known to historians as the "Perfectos".

The Robisons had previously owned the Cleveland Spiders, and in fact still owned them as the 1899 season began (a situation that would not be allowed today). They stripped Cleveland of its best players, including Cy Young, and sent them to St. Louis. If this made the St. Louis club the "Perfectos", it also unfortunately made the Cleveland club the "Wanderers", as they became known when they were forced to play most of that season (their last) on the road. Despite loading up their roster, the previously cellar-dwelling St. Louis club was only able to improve to fifth place.

Cleveland and three other clubs were contracted after the 1899 season. The Cardinals began the 1900 season with less competition, but sank back toward the cellar again. The only thing that kept the baseball situation in balance was that the new Browns of the American League (who moved from Milwaukee to St. Louis in 1902) generally fared equally poorly in the pennant races.

The wooden ballpark continued to be plagued by fire. On May 4, 1901, a fire began under the main part of the stands, and as with the 1898 fire, the structure was consumed within half an hour. During the rebuilding process, the Robison brothers arranged with the management of Athletic Park (as the "old" Sportsman's Park was being called by then) to play there until yet another wooden stand could be built. After playing there on the 5th, in a venue that local newspapers described as wholly inadequate for major league ball, they went on a month-long road trip, and returned to a newly rebuilt League Park on June 3.

In its final form, the park was typical for its era: a wooden structure, with a covered grandstand behind home plate and extending to first and third base; open bleachers extending to the left field corner; bleachers in parts of the outfield; and a covered pavilion from first base to the right field corner.

=== Robison Field ===
Helene Britton, daughter of Frank Robison, inherited the Cardinals team and the ballpark from her uncle Stanley upon his death in 1911. Helene renamed the ballpark Robison Field as a memorial to her father (who had died in 1908) and her uncle. She held the club for the next few seasons, until selling her interest in the team in 1917 to a group that included Sam Breadon.

The Cardinals never won a league championship at Robison Field, but they had some flirtations with success. In 1914, pennant fever gripped Robison Field for the first time in the 20th Century. In late August, the Cardinals were in a close three-way race with the New York Giants and the Boston Braves (who eventually won the National League title). An overflow crowd filled the old park for a doubleheader against the Giants on August 26. The Cardinals won the first game 1-0. The crowd swarmed the field between games, and Giants' manager John McGraw strenuously complained to the umpiring crew. The police cleared the field and the Giants went on to win the second game 4-0. Three days later, the Cardinals again drew an overflow crowd, this time for a doubleheader against the Braves, who swept the Cardinals and dealt a severe blow to the Cardinals' pennant hopes.

=== Cardinal Field ===
Once the Robison family was no longer associated with the team, the park was often called simply Cardinal Field in its final years. Breadon attained majority ownership in 1920 and decided that the nearly three-decades-old wooden ballpark was no longer adequate.

In mid-season 1920 the Cardinals abandoned this ballpark and moved back to Sportsman's Park, which had been rebuilt, owned and occupied by the American League version of the Browns since 1902. Their final game at the old park came on June 6, and after a road trip of three-plus weeks, they made their debut at the new park on July 1. The "Old" Sportsman's Park would outlive the "New" by some four decades.

== Legacy ==
Robison Field was the last remaining major league ballpark that was primarily wooden. The park site continued to be owned by the Cardinals for a few more years. They finally sold the property to the developers of Beaumont High School, which was built on the site and was opened in 1926. After their constant on-field struggles at the old park, the club had begun to improve after their move, and with some fresh cash, they were ready to taste success. 1926 would also be the year of the Cardinals' first modern league and World Series championship.

Beaumont High School produced a number of major league ballplayers. Its own life cycle ended in the spring of 2014, when it closed.

== Gallery ==
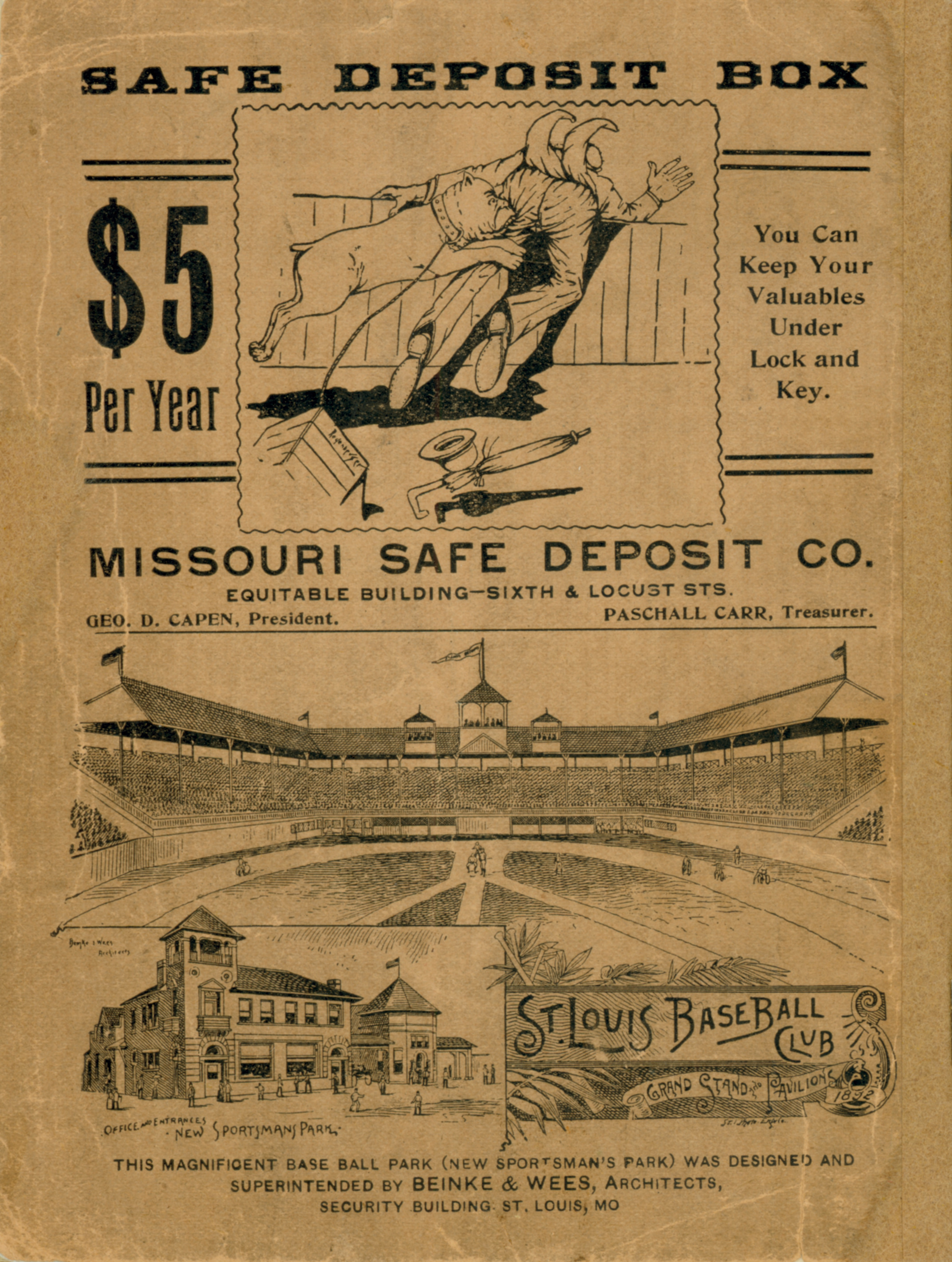
1893 scorebook cover

Artist's conception in 1893

Artist's conception of 1898 fire

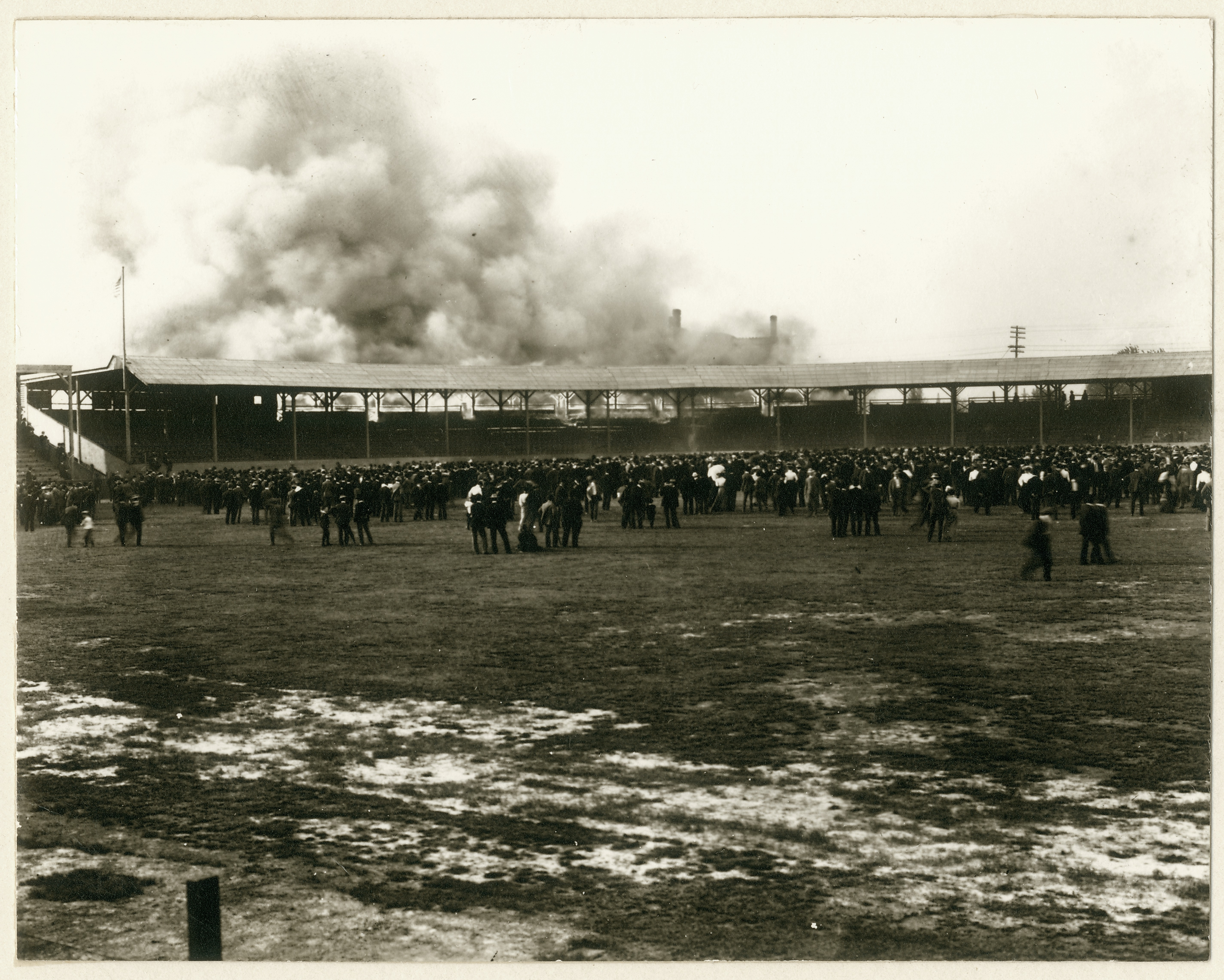
1901 fire

Robison Field outline in 1909

Preceded by Sportsman's Park	Home of the St. Louis Cardinals; 1893–1920	Succeeded by Sportsman's Park
