= Richard A. Meyer =

American businessman (1916–1990)

- Born: November 9, 1916; St. Louis, Missouri, USA
- Died: December 10, 1990 (aged 74); Richmond Heights, Missouri, USA
- Occupation: Businessman
- Known for: President, Anheuser-Busch (1971–1974); Executive vice president, St. Louis Cardinals (1953–1974)

Richard Allan Meyer (November 9, 1916 – December 10, 1990) was an American businessman, an executive with the Anheuser-Busch Companies (1937–1974) and the St. Louis Cardinals of Major League Baseball (1953–1974). He was president of Anheuser-Busch from 1971–1974 and a longtime senior manager for and aide to brewery owner August A. Busch Jr. Meyer was born in St. Louis. He attended the St. Louis University School of Commerce and Finance.

In 1953, when Busch acquired the Cardinals from Fred Saigh, he named brewery executive Meyer the general manager of the franchise because Meyer had been a baseball player as a youth.

Although being a Major League general manager during the 1950s typically called for career-long experience in professional baseball as a player or in baseball operations (including talent evaluation and player acquisition and development), as well as business acumen, Meyer held the position for two full seasons. During that tenure, the Cardinals introduced three standout rookies: outfielders Wally Moon and Bill Virdon and third baseman Ken Boyer. They broke the franchise's "color line" when their first African-American player, first baseman Tom Alston, made his National League debut on April 13, 1954. But the Redbirds struggled on the field: they went 140–168, finished sixth (1954) and seventh (1955), and changed managers, from Eddie Stanky to Harry Walker, on May 27, 1955.

Busch and Meyer then hired veteran baseball executive Frank Lane, formerly with the Chicago White Sox, to assume the team's general manager duties on October 6, 1955. Meyer returned to the brewery but remained executive vice president of the Cardinals, serving the team for another 18 years. For much of that time, he acted as the direct liaison between the Cardinals' general managers—Lane, Bing Devine, Bob Howsam and Stan Musial—and owner Busch.

Meyer, then 57, resigned from the brewery and the Cardinals in February 1974 after 38 years with Anheuser-Busch after a disagreement with Busch over personnel reduction.

He died on December 10, 1990, at the age of 74.

== See also ==
- Anheuser-Busch Companies
