= William Knoedelseder =

American journalist (born 1947)

- Born: 1947 (age 78–79); St. Louis, Missouri, U.S.
- Occupations: Author, business writer, tv producer, news executive
- Writing career
- Genre: non-fiction
- Subjects: Entertainment, business
- Notable works: Stiffed; Bitter Brew
- Website: billknoedelseder.com

William Knoedelseder (born 1947) is an American author, former Los Angeles Times business writer, television producer and news executive.

== Early life and education ==
Knoedelseder, who is from St. Louis, Missouri, graduated with a bachelor of arts in English literature from the University of Missouri-St. Louis.

== Career ==
Knoedelseder was a reporter from 1977 to 1989 for the Los Angeles Times. He also produced news for Knight Ridder, Fox and the USA Network.

His articles in the 1980s into corrupt practices in the record business formed the basis for his book Stiffed: A True Story of MCA, the Music Business and the Mafia.

In 2012, his book Bitter Brew, which spans five generations of the Busch family and the foreign takeover of Anheuser-Busch, made New York Times Bestseller list. It revealed new information about August Busch IV. In 2019, CBS Television Studios acquired the option to make it into a cable TV series produced by Jeffrey Kramer.

Knoedelseder executive produced two television documentaries – Something's Got to Give, a 1990 two-hour special for Fox about Marilyn Monroe, and All the Presidents’ Movies, a three-hour 2003 special for Bravo that described the viewing habits of modern U.S. presidents.

Knoedelseder worked as a television producer and executive creating news programs and documentaries for Fox, Disney, Knight-Ridder, Bravo and USA Broadcasting. As vice president of news at USA, he oversaw the launch of a nightly news program on WAMI-TV in Miami titled "The Times." Miami New Times named it "Best Newscast in South Florida.”

== Books ==
- Fins: Harley Earl, the Rise of General Motors, and the Glory Days of Detroit (2018), ISBN 9780062289070
- Bitter Brew: The Rise and Fall of Anheuser-Busch and America's Kings of Beer (2012), ISBN 0062009265
- I'm Dying Up Here: Heartbreak and High Times in Standup Comedy's Golden Age (2010), ISBN 1586488961
- In Eddie's Name: One Family's Triumph over Tragedy (with co-author Bryn Freedman) (1999), ISBN 0571199240
- Stiffed: A True Story of MCA, the Music Business and the Mafia (1993), ISBN 0060167459
