= Sam Breadon =

American baseball executive (1876–1949)

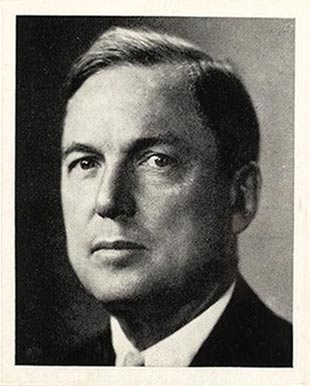
- Breadon in 1941
- Born: July 26, 1876; New York City, U.S.
- Died: May 8, 1949 (aged 72); St. Louis, Missouri, U.S.
- Occupation: Major League Baseball team owner
- Awards: St. Louis Cardinals Hall of Fame

Samuel Wilson Breadon (/ˈbreɪdən/; BRAY-din) (July 26, 1876 – May 8, 1949) was an American professional baseball executive. He served as the president and principal owner of the St. Louis Cardinals of Major League Baseball (MLB) from 1920 to 1947. During that time, the Cardinals rose from languishing as one of the National League's doormats to a premier power in baseball, winning nine NL pennants and six World Series championships. Breadon's teams also established the highest regular season winning percentage of any owner in franchise history at .570. His teams totaled 2,470 wins and 1,830 losses.

== Successful Pierce-Arrow dealer ==
Of Scottish and Irish descent, Breadon was born in New York City and raised in a working-class family in Greenwich Village. He moved to St. Louis at the turn of the 20th century and entered the automobile industry by opening a repair garage. Transitioning into sales, he purchased the Western Automobile Company, prospered as the owner of Pierce-Arrow dealerships, and became a self-made millionaire.

In 1917, he also became a minority investor—for $2,000—in the Cardinals, then a struggling, second-division team chronically strapped for resources. But the club's enterprising young president, Branch Rickey, discovered that the team could compete successfully against richer opponents by developing its playing talent on an assembly line of minor league teams, from Class D to Class AA (then the highest-ranking minor league level), that it owned and controlled. This was the effective creation of the farm system, perfected by the Cardinals and—when the Redbirds came to dominate the National League—eventually copied by the 15 other MLB teams.

== President/owner of the Cardinals ==
Rickey also served as manager of the Cardinals beginning in 1919; Breadon succeeded him as club president in 1920. Later that year, he bought enough stock to become the largest shareholder. Though it took him until 1922 to acquire controlling interest, from 1920 onward he was the head of the franchise.

In 1925, on May 31, Breadon moved Rickey into the front office full-time as business manager—general manager in contemporary terms—and promoted star second baseman Rogers Hornsby to playing manager.

The move was highly successful. Rickey would forge a Baseball Hall of Fame career as a general manager, while, in 1926, Hornsby's Redbirds won the franchise's first-ever National League pennant and World Series championship, a seven-game triumph over the New York Yankees of Babe Ruth and Lou Gehrig. But during the offseason, Breadon traded Hornsby to the New York Giants, the result of a heated confrontation between owner and player-manager in September 1926 over the playing of exhibition games during the late-season pennant race.

Rickey worked for Breadon until the end of 1942. While Rickey was granted wide-ranging authority in baseball matters, Breadon always reserved the right to choose the team's field manager. In addition to Hornsby, he would select men such as Bill McKechnie, Billy Southworth, Gabby Street, Frankie Frisch (obtained from the Giants in the Hornsby trade) and Eddie Dyer to run the Cardinals' bench. With one exception, all won world championships for St. Louis. The exception, McKechnie, was the Cards' losing skipper in the 1928 World Series, and he would be elected to the Hall of Fame in 1962 for his credentials as a manager. (Hornsby and Frisch were elected to the Hall on the strength of their brilliant playing careers, and in 2008 Southworth would enter the Cooperstown shrine posthumously for his managerial success.)

== Built NL power ==
Under Breadon, the Cardinals ruled the baseball world in 1926, 1931, 1934, 1942, 1944 and 1946, and earned NL pennants in 1928, 1930 and 1943. In addition to Hornsby and Frisch, they would feature such standout players as Jim Bottomley, Harry Brecheen, Mort and Walker Cooper, Dizzy Dean, Murry Dickson, Chick Hafey, Whitey Kurowski, Marty Marion, Pepper Martin, Joe Medwick, Johnny Mize, Terry Moore, Stan Musial, Howie Pollet, Red Schoendienst, and Enos Slaughter.

His Cardinals won more than 100 games four times: the 1931 world champions, and then the juggernaut 1942–43–44 teams of the World War II era that won 106, 105 and 105 games in consecutive years, along with their three NL pennants and two World Series championships. The 1942 Cardinals were the only National League champion to ever defeat Joe McCarthy's Yankees in a Fall Classic, taking the series four games to one. That season marked the last year of the Breadon-Rickey tandem; their relationship had begun to fray during the late 1930s, when Breadon sold his automobile dealerships and became more involved in his baseball team, and Commissioner of Baseball Kenesaw Mountain Landis cracked down on Rickey's farm system, making 74 players free agents. With Rickey's contract as general manager set to expire at the end of October 1942, Breadon notified him that he would have to take a cut in pay. Instead, Rickey moved to the Brooklyn Dodgers, where he would make history as the club's president and top baseball executive.

Despite their success on the field, the 1931–1945 Cardinals were frequently plagued by low attendance. Although they were by far the dominant team, they shared St. Louis, the smallest, two-team market in the major leagues, with the American League Browns. Their home attendance also was devastated by the Great Depression, with the 1934 world champions—the colorful "Gashouse Gang", one of the most memorable teams in MLB history—drawing only 325,000 fans. Breadon seriously explored selling the team in 1934; then, after his Cardinals had defeated the Detroit Tigers in that year's World Series, Breadon, with his connections within the auto industry, openly pondered moving the Redbirds to Detroit.

Both ideas came to nothing, however; the team remained in St. Louis and continued to struggle at the turnstiles, drawing only 291,000 fans in 1938 during a rare losing season, and not reaching pre-Depression attendance levels until the pennant-contending 1941 edition. But World War II interrupted the momentum and—despite their three pennants and two World Series titles—the Cardinals treaded water in attendance, although exceeding the National League average, from 1942 to 1945. However, with their on-field success and the advent of radio in the 1930s, they would develop a fanatical regional following, their appeal extending beyond Missouri and throughout the lower Midwest, Arkansas, Louisiana, the Great Plains states and much of the Southwest.

== Postwar years ==
After Rickey's departure, Breadon played an active role in the Cardinals' baseball operations through World War II and into the postwar era. But, apart from winning the 1946 championship, Breadon's final two years as the Redbirds' owner were fraught with difficulty. The Cardinals remained pennant contenders through 1949 (the year of Breadon's death and two years after he sold the club), but off-field issues dogged the franchise.

=== Mexican League raids ===
Attendance was about to spike in 1946 with another championship team and the postwar baseball boom, but the Cardinals maintained their reputation for a tight-fisted control on player salaries.

That season, the "outlaw" Mexican League, operating outside the "Organized Baseball" structure and its reserve clause, signed away three important Cardinal players: starting pitcher Max Lanier, swingman Fred Martin and second baseman Lou Klein. When Lanier defected in May, he had thrown six complete game victories in six starts, with an earned run average of 1.93. The Mexican League might have done even greater damage to the Redbirds. Jorge Pasquel, the league's founder, offered Musial (then making $11,500 a year) a $50,000 bonus to jump the Cardinals; the young superstar was tempted, but rejected Pasquel's offer.

In June 1946, Breadon flew to Mexico City—without the permission of Commissioner of Baseball Happy Chandler and National League president Ford Frick—for a "fact-finding" meeting with Pasquel; the raids on the Cardinals stopped, but Breadon was hit with a $5,000 fine and a 30-day suspension by Chandler, although both punishments were quickly rescinded. Lanier, Klein and Martin, meanwhile, were banned by Chandler from Organized Baseball for jumping their contracts; they would not be reinstated until June 5, 1949.

=== Abortive strike against Robinson ===
Then, in 1947, Breadon learned that some of his players planned to strike rather than take the field against Jackie Robinson of Rickey's Dodgers, the first African-American to play in Major League Baseball since the 1880s. The idea of a strike had originated with Robinson's disaffected teammate, Dixie Walker, but it had sympathizers across the league and widespread support among the Cardinals. Breadon flew to New York, conferred with NL president Frick, and then met with his team, where he read a strongly worded message from Frick vowing to suspend all the strikers from baseball. The threat then evaporated.

=== Sale to Saigh and Hannegan ===
For his entire tenure as owner, the Cardinals played in Sportsman's Park as tenants of the American League Browns. By the 1940s, Breadon chafed at this arrangement, since the Cardinals had long since passed the Browns as St. Louis' favorite baseball team. He set aside $5 million to build a new park, but was unable to find any land. By November 1947, he was facing the prospect of having to pay taxes on his fund unless he started construction on a park. When tax attorney Fred Saigh learned of this, he persuaded Breadon—who by this time was terminally ill from prostate cancer—to sell the Cardinals to him, under the pretense of avoiding the potentially hefty tax bill. To ease Breadon's nerves, Saigh took on another prominent St. Louisan, former Postmaster General Robert Hannegan, as a minority partner. Satisfied, Breadon sold the Cardinals to Saigh and Hannegan for $3 million–a handsome return on his original investment of 30 years earlier.

Breadon died in St. Louis 18 months later at the age of 72. As it turned out, the ballpark fund nearly forced the Cardinals out of town. When the tax dodge that made the purchase possible came to light, Saigh—who by this time was sole owner—was forced to put the Cardinals on the market. Just as it appeared they were moving to Houston, Texas, Anheuser-Busch and its president, Gussie Busch, stepped in to buy the team in 1953 and keep it in St. Louis.
