= Chris von der Ahe =

German-American entrepreneur (1851–1913)

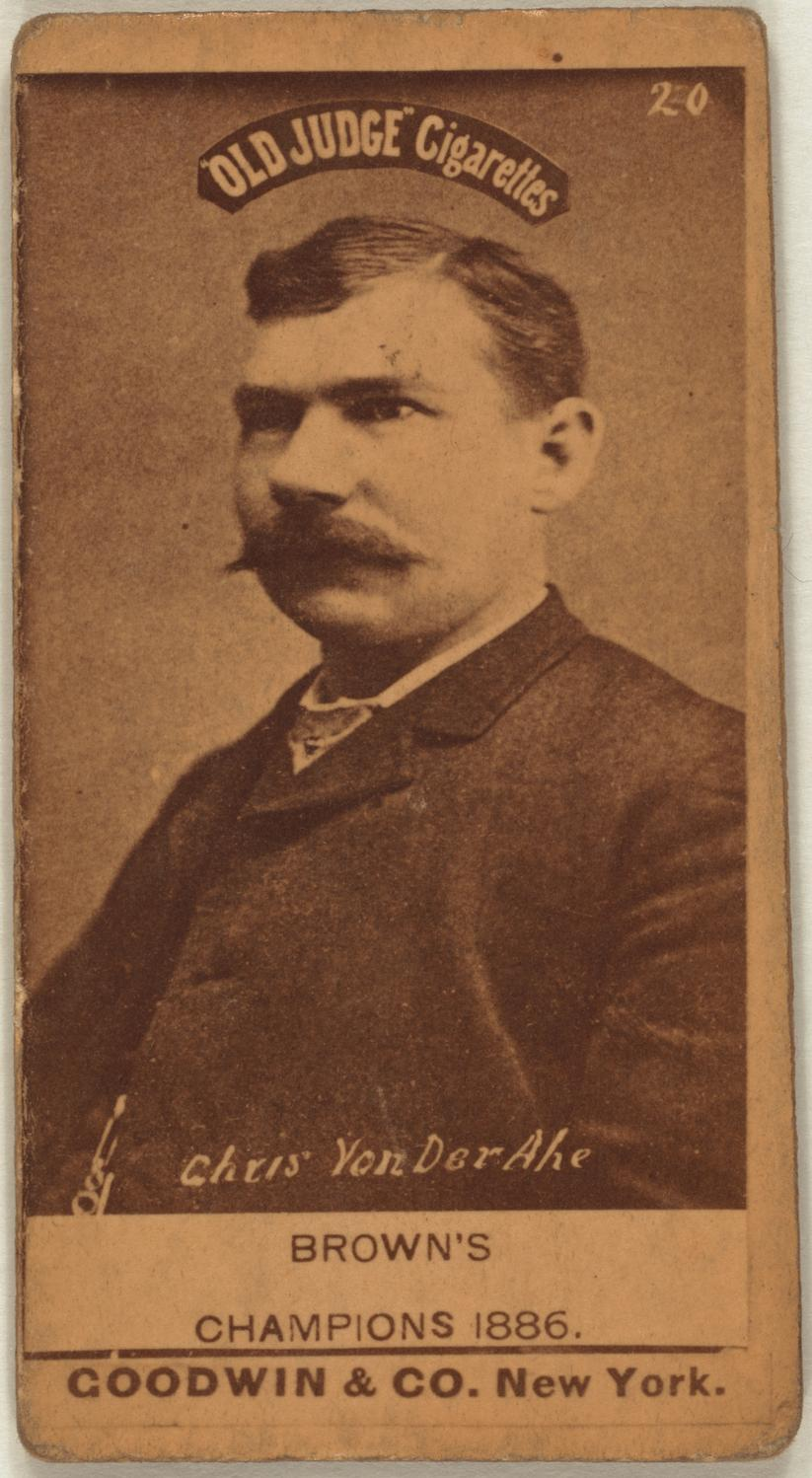
- Von der Ahe, from a baseball card, 1887
- Born: October 7, 1851; Hille, Kingdom of Prussia
- Died: June 5, 1913 (aged 61); St. Louis, Missouri, U.S.
- Burial place: Bellefontaine Cemetery
- Occupations: Founder and owner of St. Louis Cardinals (MLB), businessman, CEO, entrepreneur

Christian Friedrich (or Frederick) Wilhelm von der Ahe (German: [fɔn dɐ ˈʔaːhə]; October 7, 1851 – June 5, 1913) was a German-American entrepreneur, best known as the owner of the St. Louis Brown Stockings of the American Association, now known as the St. Louis Cardinals.

== Career ==
Born in the fall of 1851 in Hille, Kingdom of Prussia, von der Ahe immigrated alone to New York City around 1870, but quickly moved to St. Louis, where he worked as a clerk in a grocery store. Later, he bought out the store owner and expanded business by establishing a saloon in the back of the store. Von der Ahe noticed that a number of his patrons visited the saloon after baseball games, so in 1882 he bought the bankrupt and scandal-ridden St. Louis Brown Stockings baseball franchise for $1,800 and joined the American Association baseball league. He named the team the Browns and hired future Chicago White Sox owner Charles Comiskey to play first base and eventually manage the team.

Von der Ahe took a very active role in the team, even though he knew almost nothing about baseball. Other than player/manager/owner Albert Spalding, Von der Ahe was the first baseball owner with a significant public persona, the predecessor of Bill Veeck, Charlie Finley and George Steinbrenner in this regard. With his thick German accent ("I am der boss bresident of der Prowns!"), bushy mustache, and showmanship, he was as much of a story as his players.

The Browns dominated the American Association, winning four straight league championships starting in 1885. Von der Ahe's baseball, beer, and other investments made him very rich, reportedly netting $500,000 from the baseball team alone. He set the ticket price at 25 cents, hoping fans would spend money on beer. As a result, the Browns led the league in attendance and soon had to expand the ballpark. The term fan (from fanatic) is sometimes attributed to von der Ahe.

In 1885, von der Ahe erected a larger-than-life statue outside of Sportsman's Park, not of any of his star players, but of himself. A sportswriter from Denver mockingly dubbed the statue "Von der Ahe discovers Illinois." Although eccentric, von der Ahe made a number of innovations, including operating a farm club called the St. Louis Whites. Also, tradition holds that von der Ahe was the first to sell hot dogs at the ballpark, although some historians dispute this. Von der Ahe billed himself as the "Millionaire Sportsman".

In 1887, after a poor showing in the World Series, the ill-tempered von der Ahe threatened to withhold his players' share of the earnings. In 1891, he was also majority owner of the Cincinnati Kelly's Killers, who played for part of one season in the American Association.

In 1892 the team joined the National League after the American Association folded. Unfortunately for the Browns, they, along with three other AA refugees, were forced to place their players in a pool and give the established NL clubs first choice to sign them. By this time, Comiskey had lost patience with von der Ahe, and signed with the Cincinnati Reds. Without Comiskey's eye for talent, the Browns crumbled to only their second losing record as a fully professional team, finishing 11th. They would never come close to contention again during von der Ahe's ownership, never finishing higher than ninth in their first seven years in the NL and even finishing last twice.

Legal problems plagued von der Ahe's ownership, especially in its later years. In an effort to recoup his losses, in 1892 he moved to a larger ballpark, which he surrounded with an amusement park, complete with beer garden, a horse track in the outfield, a "shoot-the-shoots" water flume ride, and an artificial lake (used for ice skating in winter). The league, which prohibited gambling on its grounds, disapproved of the race track; so did von der Ahe's outfielders. The press called the facility "Coney Island West" and nicknamed von der Ahe "Von der Ha Ha."

With losses still piling up, von der Ahe resorted to selling off his best players, mostly to Brooklyn. In 1898, part of the ballpark burned down during an April game with Chicago; his second wife divorced him; and his bondsman kidnapped him for not paying his debts. In a highly publicized trial connected with the fire, von der Ahe lost his baseball team. The Browns changed hands twice and changed their name twice, first to the Perfectos (1899) and then to the Cardinals (1900). The American League team known as the St. Louis Browns from 1902 to 1953 had no connection to von der Ahe's team aside from the name, which was designed to invoke the memory of the 1885–1889 era.

Von der Ahe soon lost his other wealth as well and was reduced to tending bar in a small saloon. Comiskey frequently sent von der Ahe money to help make ends meet. In April 1908, the St. Louis Cardinals and St. Louis Browns played each other in a benefit game for him. The club raised $4,300.

== Death ==
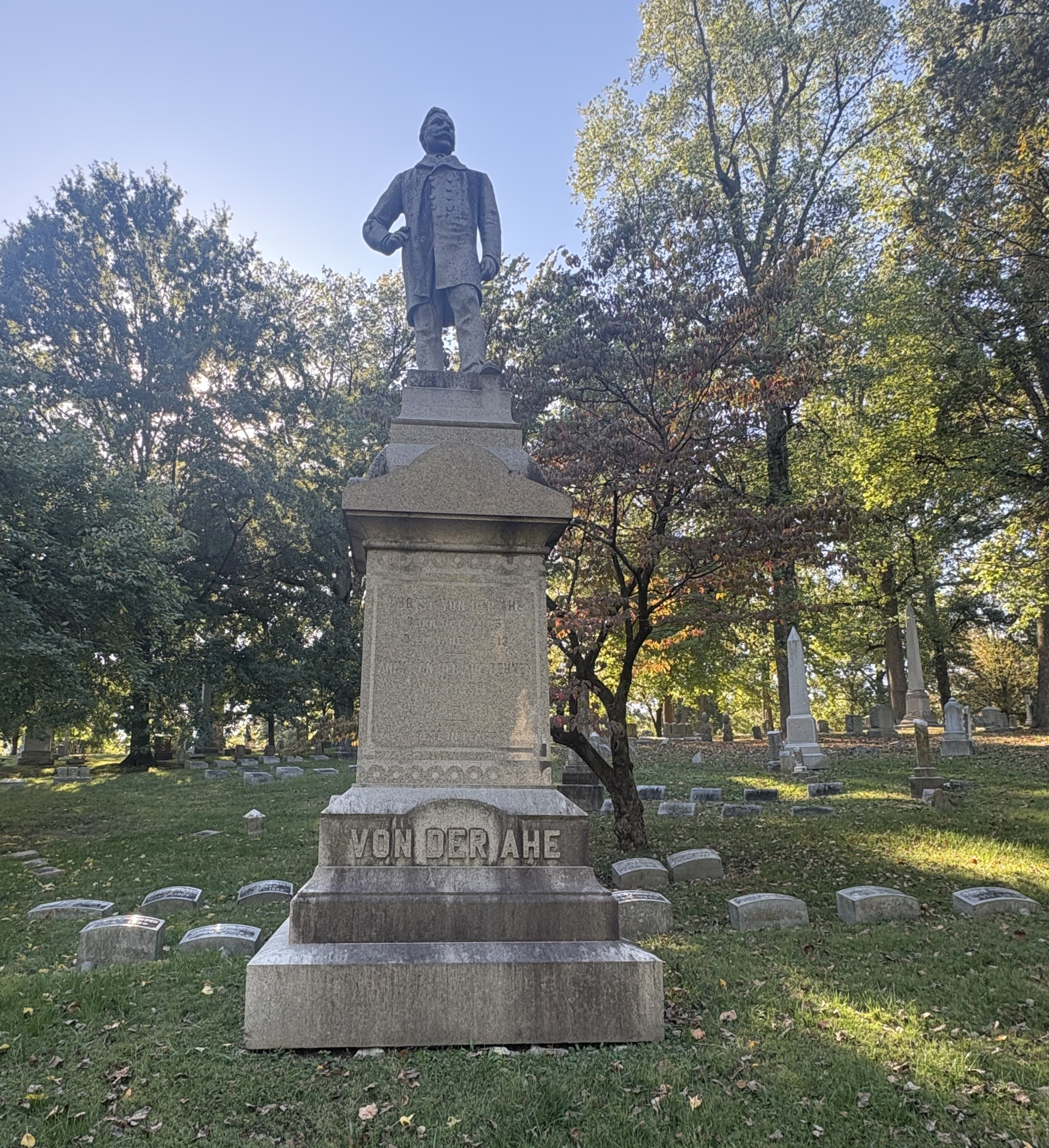
Von der Ahe's grave at Bellefontaine Cemetery

Owing to heavy lifelong alcohol consumption, he died of cirrhosis of the liver on June 5, 1913. He was buried in Bellefontaine Cemetery in St. Louis, with the statue that once stood in front of Sportsman's Park adorning his grave.

== Tribute ==
In 2015 Von der Ahe was named to the Pre-Integration Committee ballot for the National Baseball Hall of Fame.
