= St. Louis Cardinals Hall of Fame and Museum =

- Established: 2014
- Location: St. Louis, Missouri
- Coordinates: 38.6251°N 90.1935°W
- Type: Professional sports hall of fame
- Visitors: n/a
- Public transit access: MCT; Red Blue; At Stadium station
- Website: St. Louis Cardinals Hall of Fame

The St. Louis Cardinals Hall of Fame and Museum is a team hall of fame located in downtown St. Louis, Missouri, representing the history, players and personnel of the professional baseball franchise St. Louis Cardinals of Major League Baseball (MLB). It is housed within Ballpark Village, a mixed-use development and adjunct of Busch Stadium, the home stadium of the Cardinals. To date, 55 members have been enshrined within the Cardinals Hall of Fame.

== History ==
The St. Louis Cardinals Hall of Fame and Museum was previously located in downtown St. Louis in the same building as the International Bowling Museum and the World Bowling Writers International Bowling Hall of Fame, near the site of the old Busch Stadium and the new Busch Stadium. The International Bowling Museum closed its St. Louis site in November 2008 and moved to Arlington, Texas.

The Cardinals Hall of Fame likewise closed when the Bowling Museum moved and suspended public operations. However, the museum staff designed a new hall of fame and museum. The Cardinals moved the museum to the St. Louis Ballpark Village, which is located across Clark Street from Busch Stadium and opened in 2014. The new facility was constructed within the Cardinals Hall of Fame and Museum and Cardinal Nation Restaurant in Ballpark Village.

== Voting criteria and process ==
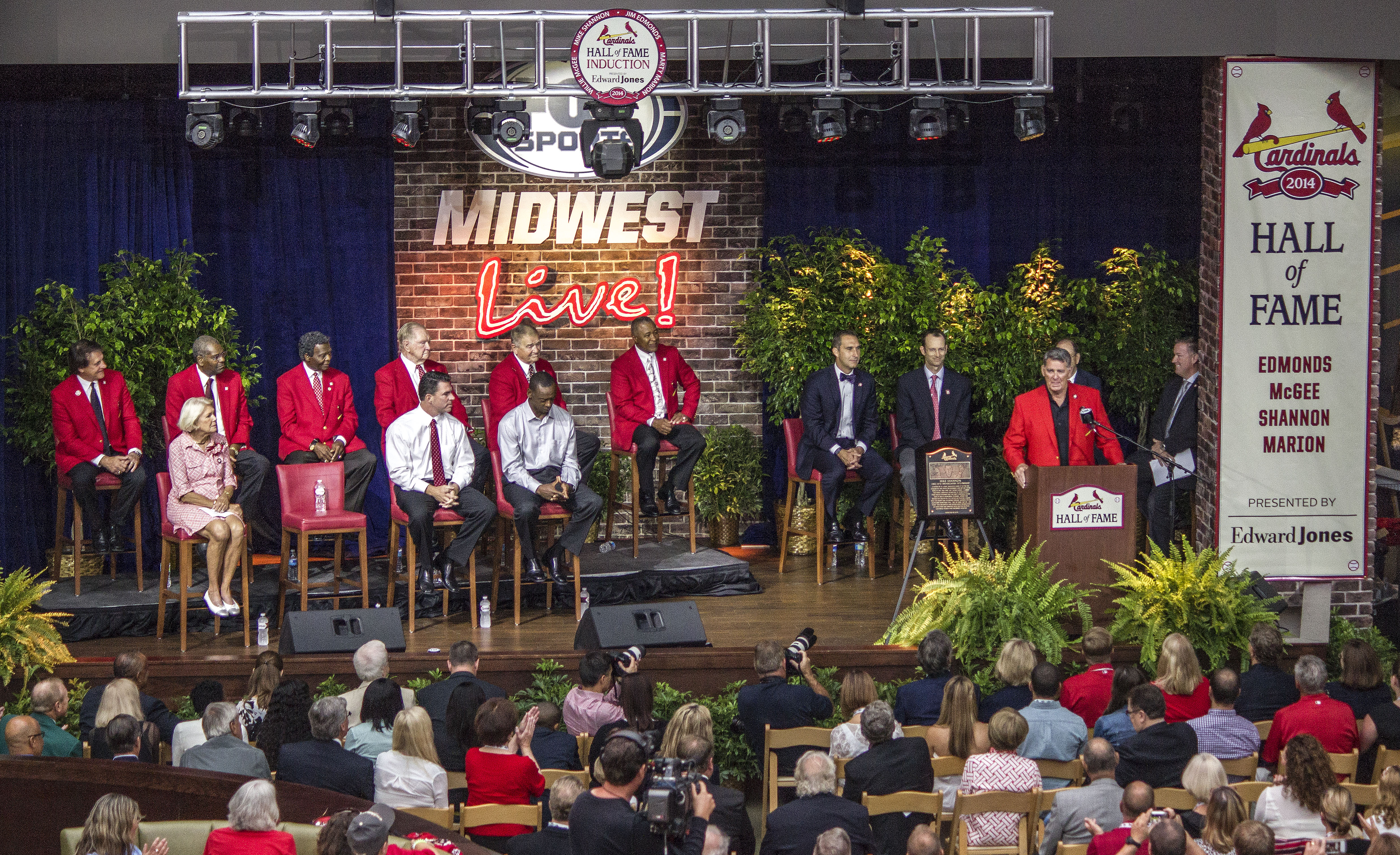
The Inaugural HOF Induction, 2014.

In January 2014, Cardinals chairman and chief executive officer William DeWitt, Jr., announced a plan for an annual formal Cardinals Hall of Fame induction process. Included components of the voting and induction process are a "Red Ribbon" committee of baseball experts, a six-week fan voting process in the spring, and an enshrinement ceremony in the summer. All former Cardinals already enshrined in the National Baseball Hall of Fame and Museum in Cooperstown, New York and those honored with their number retired were automatically enshrined into the inaugural class of the Cardinals Hall of Fame on August 16, 2014.

To be eligible for the Cardinals Hall of Fame, a player must have played three seasons for the Cardinals and have been retired from Major League Baseball for at least three years. Players are divided into two categories – "modern players" and "veteran players." Players who have been retired 40 or more years are classified as veteran players. Each year, a "Red Ribbon" committee selects one veteran player to be inducted and nominates another 6 to 10 players for a fan vote. The vote is then accomplished on the Cardinals official MLB.com website. The two players with the highest online vote total are inducted. Additionally, the team may opt to elect personnel who fulfilled other roles besides playing, such as a coach, broadcaster or front office personnel. The team creates and displays a plaque for each elected member of the Hall. The plaques are created by the same company that creates the plaques for the National Baseball Hall of Fame in Cooperstown. Each inductee is also provided with a red jacket that is to be worn at all official team ceremonies and functions. A total of 26 members were inducted for the first class of 2014. Beginning in 2021, only one modern player will be elected each year

=== Cardinals Hall of Fame inductees ===
Key
**Bold**	Member of the Baseball Hall of Fame
†	Member of the Baseball Hall of Fame as a Cardinal
**Bold**	Recipient of the Hall of Fame's Ford C. Frick Award

Positions that are listed were played the equivalent of a full season for the Cardinals.

Name	Years with Cardinals Franchise	Position(s)	Year Elected	Committee Selection
**Jim Bottomley**^{†}	1922–1932, 1939, 1955	1B, Broadcaster, Scout	2014	Inaugural
**Ken Boyer**	1955–1965, 1971–1972, 1978–1980	3B, Manager, Coach	2014	Inaugural
**Sam Breadon**	1917–1947	Owner	2016	Team
**Harry Brecheen**	1940, 1943–1952	P	2018	Red Ribbon
**Lou Brock**^{†}	1964–1979	LF	2014	Inaugural
**Jack Buck**	1954–1959, 1961–2001	Broadcaster	2014	Inaugural
**Gussie Busch**	1953–1989	Owner	2014	Inaugural
**Chris Carpenter**	2004–2012	P	2016	Fan
**Vince Coleman**	1985–1990	LF	2018	Fan
**Charles Comiskey**	1882–1889, 1891	1B, Manager	2022	Team
**Mort Cooper**	1938–1945	P	2019	Red Ribbon
**Dizzy Dean**^{†}	1930, 1932–1937, 1941–1946	P, Broadcaster	2014	Inaugural
**Dave Duncan**	1996–2011	Coach	2024	Team
**Jim Edmonds**	2000–2007, 2016–2024	CF, Broadcaster	2014	Fan
**Curt Flood**	1958–1969	CF	2015	Red Ribbon
**Bob Forsch**	1974–1988	P	2015	Fan
**Frankie Frisch**^{†}	1927–1938	2B, 3B, Manager	2014	Inaugural
**Bob Gibson**^{†}	1959–1975, 1995	P, Coach	2014	Inaugural
**Chick Hafey**^{†}	1924–1931	RF, LF	2014	Inaugural
**Jesse Haines**^{†}	1920–1937	P	2014	Inaugural
**Keith Hernandez**	1974–1983	1B	2021	Fan
**Tom Herr**	1979–1988	2B	2020	Fan
**Whitey Herzog**^{†}	1980–1990	Manager, General Manager	2014	Inaugural
**Matt Holliday**	2009–2016	LF	2022	Fan
**Rogers Hornsby**^{†}	1915–1926, 1933	2B, 3B, SS, Manager	2014	Inaugural
**Al Hrabosky**	1970–1977, 1985–present	P, Broadcaster	2025	Red Ribbon
**Jason Isringhausen**	2002–2008	P	2019	Fan
**Julián Javier**	1960–1971	2B	2022	Red Ribbon
**Walt Jocketty**	1994–2007	General Manager	2025	Team
**George Kissell**	1940–1942, 1946–2008	Coach, Instructor, Scout	2015	Team
**Whitey Kurowski**	1941–1949	3B	2024	Red Ribbon
**Max Lanier**	1938–1946, 1949–1951	P	2023	Red Ribbon
**Ray Lankford**	1990–2001, 2004	CF, LF	2018	Fan
**Tony La Russa**^{†}	1996–2011	Manager	2014	Inaugural
**Marty Marion**	1940–1951	SS, Manager, Coach	2014	Red Ribbon
**Pepper Martin**	1928, 1930–1940, 1944	3B, CF, RF	2017	Red Ribbon
**Tim McCarver**	1959–1969, 1973–1974, 2014–2019	C, Broadcaster	2017	Fan
**Willie McGee**	1982–1990, 1996–1999, 2018–2024	CF, LF, RF, Coach	2014	Fan
**Mark McGwire**	1997–2001, 2010–2012	1B, Coach	2017	Fan
**Joe Medwick**^{†}	1932–1940, 1947–1948	LF	2014	Inaugural
**Johnny Mize**^{†}	1936–1941	1B	2014	Inaugural
**Yadier Molina**	2004–2022	C	2026	Fan
**Terry Moore**	1935–1942, 1946–1952, 1956–1958	CF, Coach	2016	Red Ribbon
**Matt Morris**	1997–2005	P	2024	Fan
**Stan Musial**^{†}	1941–1944, 1946–1963, 1967	LF, CF, RF, 1B, General Manager	2014	Inaugural
**José Oquendo**	1986–1995, 1997–present	2B, SS, Coach	2023	Team
**Albert Pujols**	2001–2011, 2022	1B, LF	2026	Fan
**Édgar Rentería**	1999–2004	SS	2025	Fan
**Branch Rickey**	1919–1942	Manager, General Manager, President	2014	Inaugural
**Scott Rolen**^{†}	2002–2007	3B	2019	Fan
**Red Schoendienst**^{†}	1945–1956, 1961–1976, 1979–1995	2B, LF, Manager, Coach	2014	Inaugural
**Mike Shannon**	1962–1970, 1972–2021	3B, RF, Broadcaster	2014	Team
**Bill Sherdel**	1918–1930, 1932	P	2026	Red Ribbon
**Ted Simmons**^{†}	1968–1980	C	2015	Fan
**Enos Slaughter**^{†}	1938–1942, 1946–1953	RF, LF	2014	Inaugural
**Ozzie Smith**^{†}	1982–1999	SS, Broadcaster	2014	Inaugural
**Billy Southworth**^{†}	1926–1927, 1929, 1940–1945	RF, Manager	2014	Inaugural
**Bruce Sutter**^{†}	1981–1984	P	2014	Inaugural
**Joe Torre**	1969–1974, 1990–1995	3B, 1B, Manager	2016	Fan
**John Tudor**	1985–1988, 1990	P	2020	Fan
**Bill White**	1959–1965, 1969	1B	2020	Red Ribbon

Players who have been nominated, but not inducted, include Joaquín Andújar, Steve Carlton, George Hendrick, Brian Jordan, and Lee Smith.

After receiving the most fan votes on the 2023 ballot, David Freese later declined his induction into the Cardinals Hall of Fame.

== Selected artifacts ==
The Cardinals Hall of Fame and Museum contains over 15,000 total artifacts and 80,000 photographs, second only to the National Baseball Hall of Fame as the largest collection of baseball antiquities. The museum includes a variety of displays and features on the Cardinals' former ballparks, the old St. Louis Browns and Negro League St. Louis Stars, championship teams, uniform history, and current players. Patrons can take part in interactive displays such as recording a broadcast call of a classic Cardinals play, or holding a bat used in a game by a Cardinals star of the past. It also features a special exhibit area that hosts a new display each season: these collections have included media related to the history of the Cardinal farm system, the life and career of Stan Musial, the team's radio partnership with KMOX, and the 2011 World Series team. On home game weekends, the Museum has additional programming such as autograph sessions, panel discussions with former players or staffers, and special presentations of unique memorabilia from their archives.

Championship memorabilia

- A baseball autographed by the 1926 World Series-winning team, including an autograph from Babe Ruth, playing for the opponent the New York Yankees.
- A 1931 World Series championship ring in its original green case that was awarded to Sparky Adams
- A program from the first and only all-St. Louis World Series, played in 1944 against the Browns (now the Baltimore Orioles)
- The original Commissioner's Trophy awarded to the 1967 championship team, when the Cardinals defeated the Boston Red Sox

== See also ==
- List of St. Louis Cardinals in the Baseball Hall of Fame
- St. Louis Cardinals award winners and league leaders § St. Louis Cardinals Hall of Fame
- List of St. Louis Cardinals team records
- History of the St. Louis Cardinals: 1875–1919 • 1920–52 • 1953–89 • 1990–present
- National Baseball Hall of Fame and Museum
- Missouri Sports Hall of Fame
- St. Louis Walk of Fame
- Monument Park (Yankee Stadium) for a similar dedication by the New York Yankees to honor its achieved players.
