= History of the St. Louis Cardinals =

The history of the St. Louis Cardinals Major League Baseball franchise spans from 1875 to the present. For more information on specific periods within club history, refer to one of the following articles:

- History of the St. Louis Cardinals (1875–1919)
- History of the St. Louis Cardinals (1920–52)
- History of the St. Louis Cardinals (1953–89)
- History of the St. Louis Cardinals (1990–present)

For detailed accounts on individual seasons in St. Louis Cardinals history, see List of St. Louis Cardinals seasons.
