= History of the St. Louis Cardinals (1875–1919) =

The St. Louis Cardinals, a professional baseball franchise based in St. Louis, Missouri, compete in the National League (NL) of Major League Baseball (MLB). As the game of baseball garnered interest in the United States in the 19th century, professional baseball in St. Louis became rooted chiefly in one disestablished Major League club — named the Brown Stockings, the same as the Cardinals' earliest name — which is loosely connected but does not fall within the scope of today's Cardinals. The Brown Stockings became St. Louis' first fully professional baseball club when they gained accession in the National Association (NA) in 1875. However, the NA folded after that season. That winter, with five other former NA teams, St. Louis established a new, eight-team league called the National League (NL) and began play the next season. Despite early success, Brown Stockings players were found to be connected to game-fixing scandals, which forced bankruptcy and the club's expulsion from the NL. This scandal also abrogated their professional status but some members maintained play as a semi-professional team, primarily operated by outfielder Ned Cuthbert, until 1881.

With interest in reviving professional baseball in St. Louis steadily growing, grocery and brewery tycoon Chris von der Ahe observed with fascination that the team playing near his store and beer garden garnered large crowds. He purchased the club in 1881, and, together with other club owners (who also happened to be beer magnates) interested in creating professional league that could rival the National League, made it a charter member of the American Association in 1882, bringing professional baseball back to the Mound City. This Brown Stockings club became St. Louis' Major League mainstay, now competing as the Cardinals. During their time in the AA, the Cardinals established the first St. Louis professional sports dynasty, finishing with best overall record in the league each year from 1885 to 1888 and the best all-time record in that league's history. They also took their first interleague championship (a precursor to the World Series), finishing off their rivals, the Chicago White Stockings – now the Chicago Cubs – in the 1886 World Series.

With instability plaguing the American Association, the league folded after the 1891 season. With their name shortened to "Browns", St. Louis rejoined the National League, only to find a complete reversal of its AA success. From 1892 to 1920 – a span of 29 seasons – St. Louis managed just five winning seasons and finished in last or next-to-last place on 17 occasions. The club also rode out 31 managerial changes and two more name changes, the last being to "Cardinals" in 1900. However, following this extended era of futility, the Cardinals emerged into a renaissance in the 1920s that brought championship baseball back to St. Louis.

== Origins of professional baseball in St. Louis ==
=== Timeline of naming and affiliations ===
Franchise names

- 1875–1882: St. Louis Brown Stockings
- 1883–1898: St. Louis Browns
- 1899: St. Louis Perfectos
- 1900–present: St. Louis Cardinals

League affiliations

- 1875: National Association
- 1876–1877: National League
- 1878–1881: Independent – semi-professional
- 1882–1891: American Association
- 1892–present: National League

=== The original versus the modern game ===
The game of baseball as it is played today is significantly removed from the game that originated in the late 19th century in the northeastern United States. Noted baseball historian and statistician Bill James commented that the game and playing field resembled fastpitch softball more than contemporary baseball. The style of play diverged in many facets. Pitchers were prohibited from throwing overhand – they were only permitted to throw underhanded or sidearmed. They threw from a flat outlined box without a designated point of footing to release the ball instead of a mound with a pitching rubber until 1893. The pitcher's mound did not receive official recognition until 1903.

Counts of balls and strikes were also modified: originally, a hitter did not receive a walk until the pitcher threw nine balls and the number required to draw a walk was eventually whittled down to four in the 1880s. Hit batsmen did not automatically get awarded first base at first (it was instead counted as a ball) and foul balls and pitches taken in the strike zone were not initially regarded as strikes. Both fair ball and foul ball rules varied, influencing the batter's ability to get on base.

Fielders played barehanded; gloves did not become prevalent until the 1880s and at that point they resembled work gloves. The infield contained three fielders with a large gap between second and third base. Three fielders were stationed in the outfield like the modern game with an extra fielder, analogous with the softball "rover". In 1856, Dickey Pearce (one of St. Louis' early professional players), originally assigned as a fourth outfielder, moved into infield gap between second and third and pioneered the modern shortstop position.

=== A rivalry grows: Chicago versus St. Louis ===
Baseball fever grew rapidly across the US before the American Civil War and swept into St. Louis in the 1860s, sprouting numerous amateur teams around the city. The sport especially drew the attention of gamblers, which took decades for Major League Baseball to root out and St. Louis baseball teams would prove to be no exception. However, it was economic expansion and civic pride that ultimately drew professional baseball to St. Louis, but not first without a catalyst of emulation.

Over the years, a trade rivalry developed with the city of Chicago – a nearby "major" city – and baseball became yet another expression of this urban rivalry. While St. Louis developed as the major hub of the Mississippi River, Chicago developed as a major railway center, and by 1870, St. Louis was the fourth-largest city in the United States and Chicago a close fifth. Due to the rapid growth of the rail industry, Chicago's population passed that of St. Louis in the 1880 census.

The success of baseball clubs such as the self-proclaimed "original" professional baseball club, the Cincinnati Red Stockings – winners of 57 consecutive "official" contests from coast to coast between 1869 and 1870 – and the first dynasty in organized baseball established by the Brooklyn Atlantics - motivated Chicago city leaders to organize and recruit a club composed solely of professional players, which became the Chicago White Stockings in 1870. The White Stockings trained by playing amateur teams in nearby major cities such as St. Louis – who proved nearly unbeatable, resulting in consistently lopsided victories for Chicago – before becoming a charter member of the first all-professional league, the National Association of Professional Base Ball Players, or National Association (NA), in 1871.

Until 1874, St. Louis carried only amateur teams – two of the most prominent being the Empires and Unions – as its top level of competition. Long after other cities had established all-professional clubs, the results were almost always identical month after month, year after year: the highly skilled, professional clubs such as the White Stockings continuously walloped those of St. Louis. The scoreboard embarrassment finally convinced locals that an all-professional team was in order. City leaders raised $20,000 to make this happen – the Brown Stockings – and city development pioneer and planner John Baptiste Charles Lucas II became the team president. The club secured admission into the National Association and began play in 1875.

== The ascent and decline of St. Louis professional baseball (1875–1881) ==
=== First advent (1875–1877) ===
The same season St. Louis chartered the Brown Stockings, another all-professional startup in St. Louis, the Red Stockings began play in the NA as well. However, the Red Stockings were short-lived as they performed poorly. The Brown Stockings acquired four-time home run champion Lip Pike, a national celebrity for his long home runs, and one of the Brown Stockings' first stars. Pud Galvin's 1.16 ERA led NA in 1875. After the Brown Stockings' initial season, which saw them finish 39–29–2 among six teams, the NA folded after its fifth year due to instability.

The winter following the disestablishment of the NA, six teams from that league – the Brown Stockings, the White Stockings, the Philadelphia Athletics, the Boston Red Stockings, the Hartford Dark Blues, and Mutual of New York – and two expansion franchises, the Cincinnati Red Stockings and the Louisville Grays all agreed to form a new all-professional baseball league, the National League (NL). St. Louis improved on its first and only year in the NA, going 45–19 that year for a third-place finish. George Bradley, who pitched every game and all but four innings for the Brown Stockings that year, hurled the first no-hitter in Major League history against the Dark Blues. He led the NL that year with a 1.23 earned run average (ERA) and 16 shutouts in 573 innings pitched.

=== Decline and renascent (1877–1881) ===
However, St. Louis was expelled from the NL after the 1877 season due to a game-fixing scandal that involved two players whom they had acquired from the Louisville Grays. The team went bankrupt. Despite bankruptcy and expulsion, they continued play as a semi-professional barnstorming team for four years behind the efforts of outfielder Ned Cuthbert – one of the NL Brown Stockings' players – to keep them playing games against anyone who would play.

From the moment of the Brown Stockings' resignation from the NL, St. Louis Republic sportswriter Al Spink, who before had reported on underhanded agreements to fix games prior to the expulsion, lobbied to get professional baseball back in St. Louis. The team's play did not disappoint, helping to draw local fans from their antipathy toward the sport and back into Grand Avenue Grounds. As excitement grew, Cuthbert cultivated the interest of the otherwise baseball-ignorant German immigrant Chris von der Ahe, a saloon and grocery store owner, in the team, . Before the 1882 season, Von der Ahe purchased the troubled but promising remnant of the Brown Stockings. He made Spink the team's secretary and business manager, and Spink helped generate even greater revenues. Together with beer magnates in five other cities, Baltimore, Cincinnati, Louisville, Philadelphia, and Pittsburgh, Von der Ahe established St. Louis in a new all-professional baseball league, the American Association, as a rival to the National League.

== American Association era (1882–1891) ==
St. Louis found their first taste of consistent, competitive major league baseball starting in 1882, their first year in the now-defunct American Association (AA), with a fifth-place finish at 37–43. In 1883, the team's name was officially shortened to the Browns (the uniform socks and trim were now red, so "Brown Stockings" made little sense), and they broke through to the league's elite with Tony Mullane and Jumbo McGinnis tag-teaming as a formidable two-man starting rotation. The Browns improved to 65–33 (.663 winning percentage) and second place. Greater success lay ahead still. Guided mainly by manager Charlie Comiskey, the club went on to establish themselves as the dominant team in the league, winning four pennants in a row in from 1885 to 1888.

=== Pennant run (1885–1888) ===
During their four-year pennant run, pitcher Bob Caruthers and outfielder Tip O'Neill starred for the Browns. In the formative years of the major leagues, where record statistical achievement transpired that is perceived as rare in today's game, a group of talented stars including Caruthers and O'Neill led St. Louis. O'Neill won the first batting triple crown in franchise history in 1887, the only one in AA history, and just the second in Major League Baseball history with a .435 batting average, 14 home runs, 123 runs batted in (RBIs). He also led the league in runs scored, doubles, triples, on-base percentage (OBP), and slugging percentage. In 1885, Caruthers won 40 games and allowed a 2.07 earned run average (ERA), both tops in the AA. The next year, Caruthers appeared in 43 games in the outfield in addition to 44 appearances as a pitcher, and he was one of the AA's top hitters, leading the league with an OPS+ of 201, and an OBP of .446. He also finished in the top ten in batting average at .334, triples, walks, and second in slugging percentage (.527). Dave Foutz emerged as another two-way threat, winning the ERA title at 2.11 and 41 games won in 504 innings pitched, and batted .280 with 18 doubles, 9 triples, three home runs, 59 RBIs, and 17 stolen bases. While his 1887 season as a pitcher was a disappointment by his standards, with "just" 25 wins and a 3.87 ERA, he had his best season at the plate, batting .357 with 13 triples, four home runs, 108 RBIs and 22 stolen bases. Pitcher Silver King compiled a 45–20 record while allowing a 1.63 ERA and striking out 258 in 585 innings in 1888. His 15.8 total WAR is the Cardinals' franchise record, the ninth-highest single season total in history, 14.0 pitching WAR the 11th-highest and his 195 ERA+ is the 41st-best in major league history. That year, the Browns' pitching staff posted a 2.09 ERA and a 152 ERA+.

St. Louis' highest winning percentages occurred in 1885 at .705, and in 1887 at .704. The Browns finished with a winning percentage of .625 or better eight times. One of the three teams to participate in all ten seasons in the league's history, St. Louis totaled 780 wins and 432 losses for a .689 winning percentage. Both the win total and winning percentage are league records, despite the Boston Reds' single season in the AA also resulting in a .689 winning percentage: When rounded to five digits, St. Louis' winning percentage was .68905 and Boston's was .68889. Their four pennants won are also the most pennants in league history.

During the height of the Browns' success in the American Association, another St. Louis entry known as the Maroons commenced play in 1884 in the Union Association. Henry Lucas – a younger brother of the original Brown Stockings' owner J. B. C. Lucas II – owned the Maroons and established the league. The Maroons won the league with a 94–19 record (.832 winning percentage) in its only year of existence, then joined the National League the following year. However, the Maroons' success was short-lived as their winning percentage bottomed out to .333, and they could no longer compete with the Browns' domination of the American Association. Lucas sold the team to the NL, who in turn, sold it to John T. Brush after the 1886 season. Brush moved the club to Indianapolis and renamed it the Hoosiers.

=== Drawing the color line in baseball (1887) ===
Racial segregation started to become a custom in baseball about the time that eight Browns members withdrew from playing an exhibition game in September 1887 against the New York Cubans, a prominent 'colored' team. The Browns were in Philadelphia with plans to travel to New York City to play the Cuban Giants in a lucrative exhibition game. However, the night before departure to New York, eight Browns players signed and delivered a letter to Von der Ahe stating their disagreement to "play against negroes to-morrow", because they thought they were "only doing what is right."

The cancelation of the game with the Cuban Giants was part of a larger trend around the sport. That season, Cap Anson of the Chicago White Stockings publicly threatened not to play any 'white' professional teams who hired black players just months after the International League prohibited further signing of black players. It would be by an act 60 years later by then-former Cardinals executive in Branch Rickey that broke the color barrier in MLB when he debuted Jackie Robinson in 1947 with the Brooklyn Dodgers.

=== Early version of the World Series and AA's final seasons ===
Due to their AA pennant wins, the Browns played in a predecessor of the World Series from 1885–1888, in which the AA champion challenged the NL champion in what was considered at the time an exhibition series, predating the formation of the American League. The Browns met the Chicago Cubs prototype, the Chicago White Stockings for the first two World Series. The 1885 series ended in a dispute (tie), but St. Louis won the 1886 series outright, spurring a vigorous St. Louis-Chicago rivalry that ensues to this day. This 1886 World Series was also the only one won by any AA team. In the 1887 series St. Louis fell to the Detroit Wolverines and in 1888 to the New York Giants.

Although it was not apparent at the time, the Browns had crested. While they would never win another AA pennant, the Browns remained one of the league's strongest clubs until the league's end, finishing in second twice and third once in each of the next three seasons. On the last day of the 1891 season, pitcher Ted Breitenstein, making his first Major League start (though not his début), threw a no-hitter against the Louisville Colonels, an 8–0 defeat. This contest proved significant in two ways. Not only was it the first no-hitter in franchise history, but it would be the last no-hitter in the American Association, as the league went bankrupt and ceased operations following the 1891 season. The Browns migrated to the National League, leaving behind much of their success for the next three decades.

== Early National League reboot (1892–1919) ==
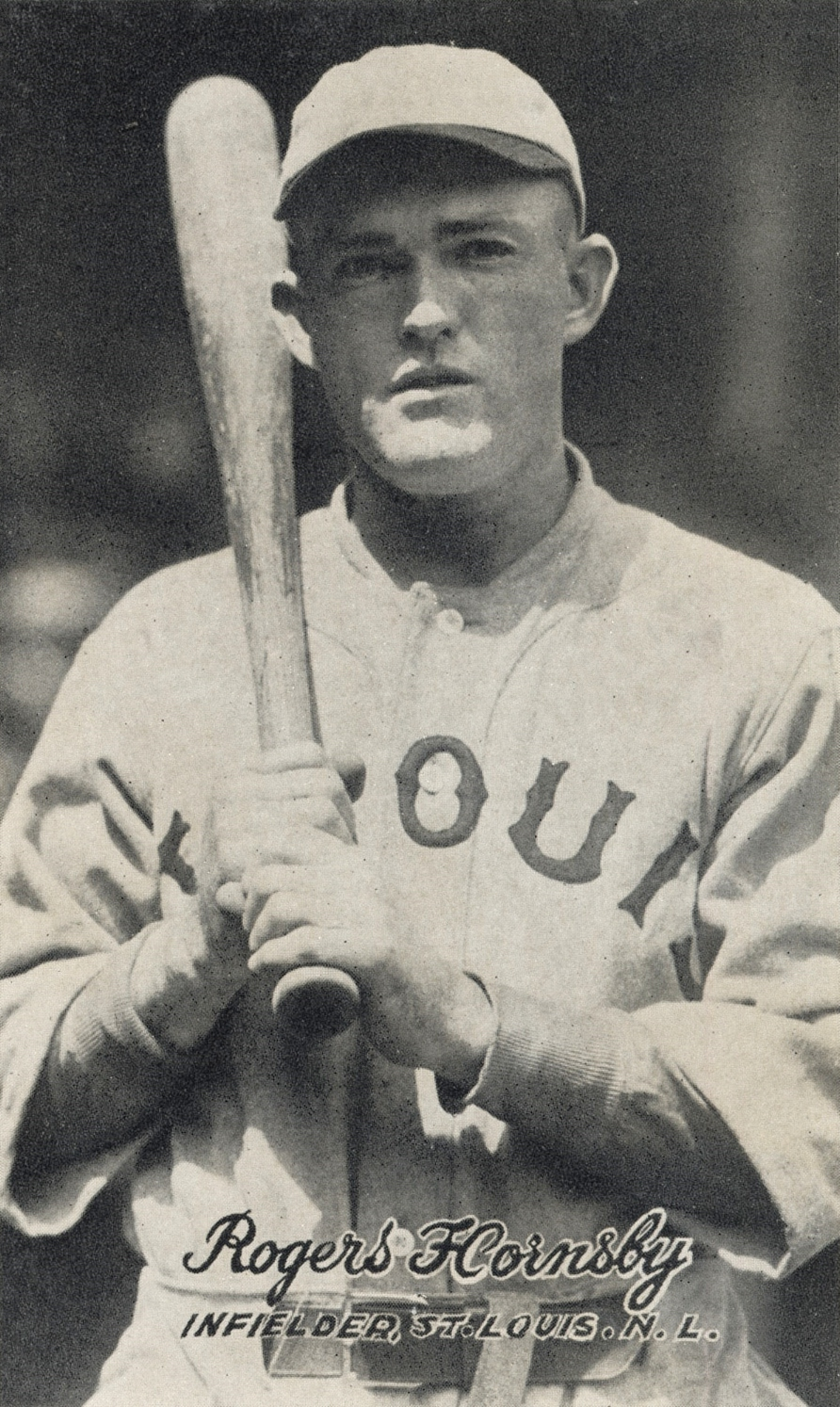
Rogers Hornsby won two Triple Crowns with the Cardinals.

=== First period of extended struggle ===
After the American Association collapsed, the Browns joined the National League along with the Baltimore Orioles, Louisville Colonels, and Washington Senators. St. Louis has had continuous affiliation in the NL since. Unfortunately for the Browns, the AA refugees were forced to place their players in a pool and give the established NL clubs first choice to sign them. By this time, Comiskey had lost patience with von der Ahe, and signed with the Cincinnati Reds. Without Comiskey's eye for talent, the Browns' inaugural season in the National League was largely a disappointment. They crumbled to only their second losing record as a fully professional team, finishing 11th; their winning percentage plunged from .625 in 1891 to .373. It would be the start of a quarter-century downturn in the franchise's fortunes. Between 1892 and 1919, St. Louis managed just five winning seasons, finishing in last or next-to-last place 16 times and only finishing higher than fifth three times. They had also had no pennants and four 100-loss seasons. In addition, 26 different managers took the helm totaling 31 changes.

With an opportunity emerging the next season for a larger property at Vandeventer and Natural Bridge Avenues, Von der Ahe moved the club a few blocks north-northwest from Grand and Dodier and opened a new park christened as "New Sportsman's Park" on April 27. The last game in Sportsman's Park was against the Cincinnati Reds on April 23. Despite the new park and league, the struggles the club encountered to rediscover the form of success that hallmarked their dominance in the American Association endured. The team bottomed out in the 1897 season when it finished 29–102; the .221 winning percentage is still the worst in franchise history.

After nearly a decade of lackluster performance on the field and declining profits off it, a calamitous fire at New Sportsman's Park in 1898 destroyed the stadium and forced the team into bankruptcy. A resulting lawsuit forced Von der Ahe to sell the team at auction. C. Edward Becker purchased all of the St. Louis club's stock and became known informally as "Chris's angel". In the spring of 1899, the NL board of directors met and expelled the old Sportsman's club and St. Louis Base Ball Association for failure to pay league dues and player transaction fees. A new franchise, the American Base ball and Athletic Exhibition Company of St. Louis, was admitted to the league as a full member in good standing after paying those outstanding debts. Frank De Haas Robison, also the owner of the Cleveland Spiders, purchased the team and became president of the new association, and Becker the vice president. Robison's brother, Stanley Robison, became co-owner.

Hoping to reverse St. Louis' fortunes coming off a 39–111 season, Robison adopted new uniforms with a cardinal red trim and sock striping prior to 1899. He also discarded the Browns' name, but didn't adopt a new one; local sportswriters called them the "Perfectos." He also renamed the Perfectos' stadium League Park. Agitated by dismal fan attendance in Cleveland, Robison in turn infused the Perfectos roster with much of the Spiders' marquée talent just weeks before the season opener. Three of Cleveland's future Hall of Famers migrated to St. Louis: Cy Young, Jesse Burkett, and Bobby Wallace. The roster maneuvers successfully switched the teams in the standings but failed to create the powerhouse Robison envisioned as St. Louis finished just fifth in both 1899 and 1900. However, their 84–67 finish in 1899 was the team's best record between the AA era until 1921, after Sam Breadon purchased the company.

Meanwhile, the beleaguered Spiders lost 134 games that year – easily the worst record in MLB history, one that has not been matched despite incremental increases in the number of games played in a season over the years. After the season, the Spiders were euthanized as part of a league-wide contraction that saw the National League shrink from twelve to eight teams. The new vacancies of professional baseball franchises opened the door for the creation of the American League (AL), a new major league to rival the National League. Of all leagues formed in an attempt to rival the NL since the days of the American Association, the AL has outlasted every other one and became one of the highest-quality competitive leagues comparable to the NL, effectively replacing the former.

During a road trip to Chicago later that season, St. Louis Republic sportswriter Willie McHale included an account in a column of a female fan from Chicago remarking about the uniforms, "Oh, isn't that a lovely shade of cardinal." Fans took keenly to the moniker "Cardinals" and, the next year, popularity for the nickname induced an official change to Cardinals. Meanwhile, changes in St. Louis' competitive status were also afoot – albeit temporarily. Leading the Cardinals' to newfound glory, Young compiled a 45–35 won–lost record, a 2.78 ERA and 72 complete games of 85 starts in 690 innings. One effect of the new American League's formation was that it precipitated Young's departure from St. Louis when he "jumped" to the Boston Americans before the 1901 season – during a time when jumping was commonplace.^{[a]} In spite of Young's departure, the 1901 team continued its resurgent play with a 76–64 record propelled by the highest-scoring offense in the NL, finishing in fourth place out of eight teams. Burkett, an outfielder, led the NL in batting average (.376), hits (226), on-base percentage (.440) and runs (140). This was their best positional finish from their entrance into the NL until 1914, when they finished third, and their second-highest winning percentage (.543) between entering the NL and 1921. The three-season period 1899 and 1901 marked the zenith of their first three decades in the National League in terms of won-lost records.

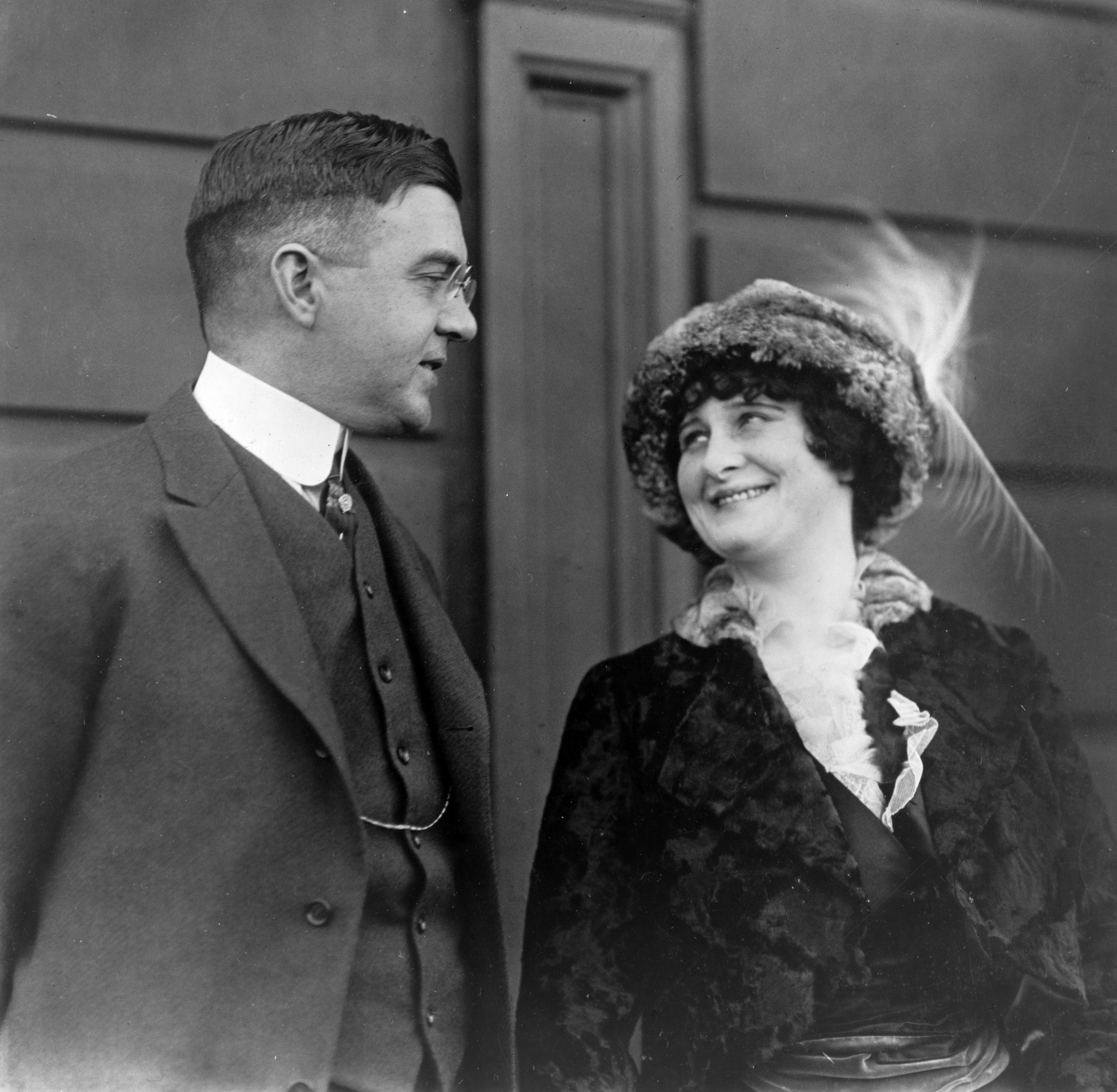
Helene Britton, owner of the team 1911–1916, with her husband Schuyler. Britton was the first female owner of a professional sports team. Schulyer served as team president 1913–1916.

=== Another Browns incarnation: A new cross-city rival ===
In 1902, an American League team moved from Milwaukee into St. Louis and claimed the old moniker of Browns, striking an instant rivalry that lasted five decades. The new Browns turned out to be a hit in St. Louis and a formidable rival for the Cardinals in spite of similar levels of success on the field into the 1920s. Not only did this version of the Browns usurp the Cardinals' former namesake which symbolized their glory years, the club even built a new stadium on the old site of the Cardinals' ballpark – then within walking distance of New Sportsman's Park – and outdrew them at the gate in their first two decades in St. Louis. Further stoking the rivalry, Burkett jumped from the Cardinals to the Browns, although at this point his skill were in decline. In his three seasons with the Cardinals, he batted a combined .378; in three seasons with the Browns he batted a combined .290.

In 1911, Robison's daughter, Helene Hathaway Britton inherited the Cardinals when his brother and co-owner, Stanley Robison died and became the first female owner of a professional sports team in United States history. In memory of her father, Britton renamed the Cardinals stadium from League Park to Robison Field. Also from Cleveland, she owned the Cardinals until selling off all her holdings in 1917 to a group of investors, including her attorney James C. Jones and a local automobile dealer named Sam Breadon. Jones became chairman and Breadon purchased his shares for $200. At this point, there were no majority owners.

=== Languishing financially ===
With limited financial resources, the club could ill-afford to sign the amount of the caliber of players required to field a competitive team. Kid Nichols briefly pitched and managed for the Cardinals, sporting a 2.02 ERA in 317 innings in 1904. Player–manager (Second base) Miller Huggins twice led the league in walks and on-base percentage with .432 in 1913. Slim Sallee pitched for the Cardinals from 1908 to 1916, winning 106 games with a 2.67 ERA while leading the league in shutouts twice.

Led by the surprising pitcher Bill Doak's and his spitball forerunning the NL with a 1.76 ERA, the 1914 team's third-place finish with a league-leading team 2.38 ERA caused a stir as a St. Louis team had not fared that well in the National League since 1876. It was also their best positional placement since 1891, a second-place finish in the final year of the American Association. In addition to his ERA title, Doak finished second in shutouts (7) and wins (19). Throwing 30 career shutouts, he ranks second in franchise history. However, the next year, Doak and the Cardinals failed to parlay their previous season's success as they lost nine more games and dropped into sixth place. One bright spot was slugging second baseman Rogers Hornsby making his Major League début, who appeared in eighteen games.

Meanwhile, the fan-controlled club continued to lack a point man with substantial baseball operations experience to run the club. However, the club found their operations manager in 1917 when the Cardinals ownership group persuaded new Browns owner Phil Ball to release Branch Rickey, then-Browns president, from his contract to become president and business manager of the Cardinals. Ball was contemptuous of Rickey's religious practices which influenced his approach to the game, and the two men frequently clashed as thus. In spite of the quarreling, Rickey was reluctant to join the Cardinals because the club was notoriously undercapitalized and underachieving. However, another role as team president meant Rickey could stay in St. Louis to rear his growing family.

After dropping even further toward the bottom of the NL in 1916, the 1917 Cardinals toiled to match their third-place finish in 1914. Hornsby, entering his prime, led the NL in slugging percentage (.484) and OPS (.869) and rated his best defensive season at 3.5 wins above average. Rickey frequently bickered with Huggins, who chafed over Rickey's theoretical approach to the game. After the season, the New York Yankees lured Huggins away to be their manager. The Cardinals again flopped the next two seasons, finishing with a .395 and .394 winning percentage.

Breadon, a St. Louis Pierce-Arrow auto dealer who still owned a minority share, decided that he enjoyed his interaction with sports stars after meeting Hornsby at a baseball dinner in 1917. Through this point, he had conceded frequent requests for financial assistance but decided to raise his stake in the corporation to $2,000. In part inquesting his own financial relief, Rickey took a commission in the Army from August to November 1918 in World War I in France serving in the Chemical Warfare Service. He returned to a team that had only waded into even greater financial danger than before he left. The club's financial burden was further strained as few stockholders were willing to invest more. One exception was Warren "Fuzzy" Anderson, Breadon's partner in the Pierce-Arrow dealership, who confided with him had more $15,000 invested in the Cardinals. Anderson decided he, too, wanted to invest more in the Cardinals. He requested financial assistance from Breadon who complied, loaning more than $18,000 to the franchise and for Anderson to purchase more stock.

After quickly acquiring some of the greatest fiscal investment in the club, Jones named Breadon as chairman of the board. Late in 1919, Jones asked him to accept the position as president of the team. Envisaging a possibility of frustrated control due to the number of persons comprising the board, Breadon demanded a condition that the number of members of the board be reduced from 25 to five. After a meeting, he accepted the position with a board membership that was reduced to seven, supplanting Rickey as team president.

Because Anderson held the second-largest share in the club, he reasoned that he should be named vice president. However, Breadon balked. Dejected at his refusal to share power, Anderson sold Breadon all his remaining stock, ending his baseball ownership career. Perceiving that Rickey may have been miffed at his removal from the position of team president, Breadon instead offered him the position of vice president, which he accepted. With a loan from Breadon, he purchased a stake in the team amounting to less than 20%. At this point, Rickey was firmly entrenched in nearly all front office decisions. In 1919, to avoid paying a separate manager's salary, he appointed himself to succeed Jack Hendricks as field manager, who had quit. He even borrowed items from his wife's stockpile of heirlooms to partially furnish his office.

Doak became credited for the modern design of the baseball glove after suggesting to Rawlings in 1919 that a web be laced between the thumb and forefinger to create a pocket that extended the surface by which the fielder could catch the ball. Also that year, the league moved to ban pitching with the spitball due in part to it giving the pitcher an unfair advantage over the hitter. However, he helped lead an initiative to which the owners eventually agreed to a provision that allowed himself and 16 other spitballers to grandfather use of the pitch until the end of their careers.

Due to possessing an apparent genius for player development, Jones initially attempted to persuade Rickey to surrender his in-game managerial duties to concentrate fully on the front office. However, he insisted upon remaining the field manager while carrying on his front office duties and continued to do so until 1925. Breadon also recognized Rickey's acumen, and – along with his proclivity for signing players as cheaply as possible – the two men united into a mutually workable arrangement as one of Rickey's chief motives was also to sign as talented of players as inexpensively as possible. Unlike many owners who seemed content to dabble in front office affairs, Breadon was comfortable deferring the player management and development decisions to Rickey. This owner-executive combination catalyzed into one of the most powerful duos in sports. In the years ensuing, Rickey stumbled upon a relatively untapped player development model that he established ahead of its time and helped actuate the Cardinals' second golden era later in the 1920s.

For the next historic period, see: 1920–1952.

1875–1919 | 1920–1952 | 1953–1989 | 1990–present

Achievements
Preceded by Providence Grays; 1884	pre-World Series co-champions St. Louis Browns w/Chicago White Stockings; 1885	Succeeded by St. Louis Browns; 1886
Preceded by St. Louis Brown Stockings and Chicago White Stockings; 1885	pre-World Series Champions; St. Louis Browns; 1886	Succeeded by Detroit Wolverines; 1887
Achievements
Preceded by New York Metropolitans; 1884	American Association Champions; St. Louis Browns; 1885–1888	Succeeded by Brooklyn Bridegrooms; 1889
