= History of the St. Louis Cardinals (1953–1989) =

The St. Louis Cardinals, a professional baseball franchise based in St. Louis, Missouri, compete in the National League (NL) of Major League Baseball (MLB). In early 1953, the Anheuser-Busch (AB) brewery bought the Cardinals, and August "Gussie" Busch became team president. Busch's influence is still seen today as three of the Cardinals' home stadia are or were named some form of Busch Stadium. Three World Series titles in the 1960s and 1980s, contrasted with missing the playoffs for the entirety of the 1950s and 1970s checkered the team's success distinctly by decades. However, the team still remained generally competitive in each of those decades - they did not see a last place finish until 1990, which had been the first since 1918. With Busch's tenure as owner, the Cardinals also won six NL pennants.

== Stan Musial's latter career; Beginning of the Anheuser-Busch era (1953–1963) ==
Soon after A–B purchased the team, Busch bought Sportsman's Park from St. Louis Browns owner Bill Veeck, renovated it, and renamed it Busch Stadium. The Browns, who had not been as successful or popular as the Cardinals in three decades, realized they could not compete with the deep pockets of the brewery. After the 1953 season the Browns left St. Louis to become the Baltimore Orioles (but kept the same colors), leaving the Cardinals as the only major league team in town.

With the breaking of the color barrier that had started in 1947, in 1954, the Cardinals debuted Tom Alston, the first African-American player on the Major League club. This was at the initiative of Gussie Busch, CEO of Anheuser-Busch and team president. Shortly after taking over ownership of the team, he asked manager Eddie Stanky where the team's black players were. Upon hearing that there were not any, he told Stanky and the coaches to find one and sign him, since his company sold more beer to African-Americans than any other brewery and he feared a possible boycott. "It can't be the great American game if blacks can't play," he said.

When the Cardinals bought Alston, they learned that he was two years older than he had been represented to them as, and Busch demanded $20,000 back since he believed the team had been swindled out of two seasons' of his career. Alston did not ultimately work out for the Cardinals, but other black players such as Bob Gibson, Lou Brock and Curt Flood led the competitive Cardinals clubs of the 1960s. The Cardinals' dissolution of the color barrier actualized a new phase when they became the first Major League organization to integrate spring training housing, albeit reluctantly.

Between 1954 and 1959, the Cardinals finished below the .500 mark in four of five seasons. In 1954, Wally Moon replaced the popular Enos Slaughter in center field and won the first Rookie of the Year (ROY) award in franchise history with a .304 batting average, 12 home runs and 193 hits. Replacing Moon in center––who shifted to right field––Bill Virdon was voted ROY the next season. In 1957, the Cardinals finished in second place, leading the league in batting average (.274) and finishing third in earned run average (3.78).

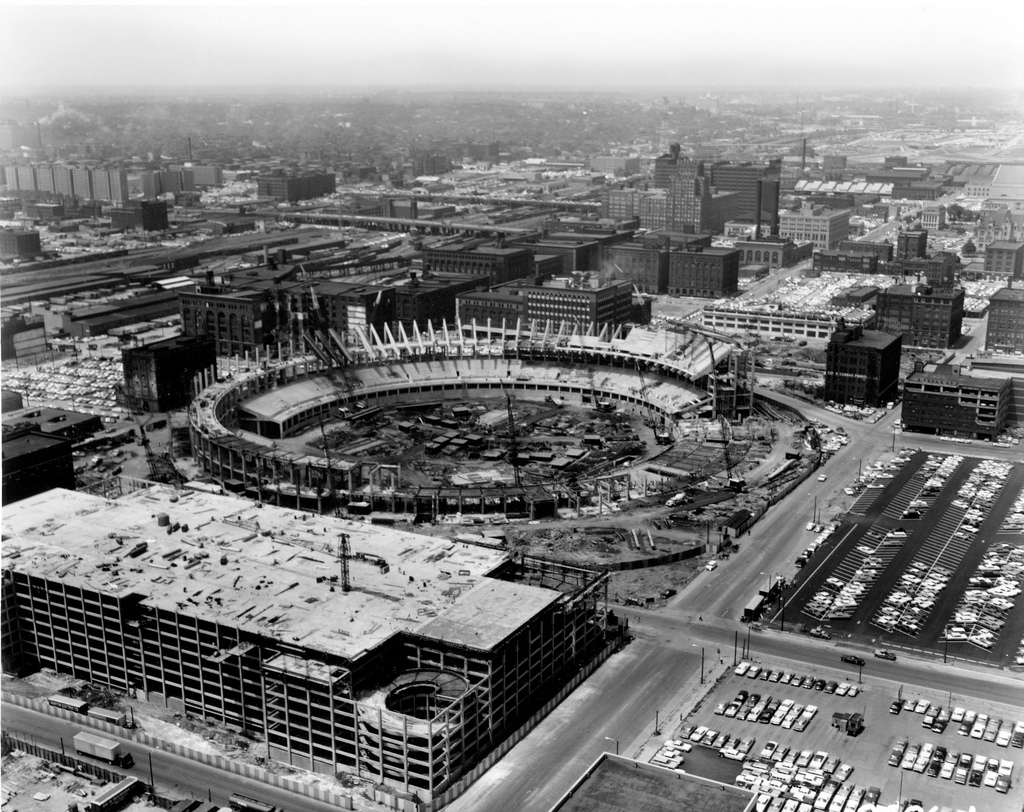
Busch Memorial Stadium under construction in 1965

Meanwhile, a National Football League (NFL) Cardinals franchise relocated from Chicago to St. Louis in 1960. Chicago was distinctly becoming the Bears' town and the Cardinals could not match their success. The 12 NFL owners unanimously voted to allow the Chicago Cardinals franchise to move. Ironically, Chicago forms the other half of the MLB's Cardinals' baseball rivalry with the Cubs. The football Cardinals called St. Louis and Busch Stadium/Busch Memorial Stadium home through the 1987 season, after which the Cardinals migrated to Phoenix to become the Arizona Cardinals. Local sports fans and media coverage referred to the two teams as the "baseball Cardinals" and "football Cardinals". For decades before the NFL Cardinals moved into St. Louis, the baseball team was also known as the "Redbirds", while the football team was the "Gridbirds" or "Big Red".

Stan Musial remained St. Louis' most consistent player, winning seven batting titles and gaining election to the Major League Baseball All-Star Game every year from 1946 until his retirement in 1963, which ironically was the last year before the Cardinals' next World Series appearance and win. In 1958, Musial became the eighth player in Major League Baseball history to accumulate 3,000 hits. In 1968, the Cardinals erected a statue of Musial outside of Busch Memorial Stadium that was moved to the new Busch Stadium in 2006 and is inscribed with this quote: "Here stands baseball's perfect warrior. Here stands baseball's perfect knight." President Barack Obama bestowed Musial with the Presidential Medal of Freedom in 2011.

== Bob Gibson and Lou Brock (1964–1969) ==
=== "Brock for Broglio" ===
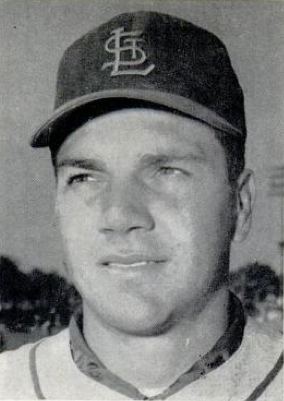
Ken Boyer (pictured in 1955) won an MVP and five Gold Glove Awards while playing for the Cardinals.

The Cardinals returned to the top in the 1960s with the help of a franchise-altering trade and the emergence of a dominating pitcher. In 1964 the Cardinals traded pitcher Ernie Broglio and two other players to the rival Cubs for outfielder Lou Brock and two other players. The trade, since nicknamed "Brock for Broglio", has become emblematic of trades which in retrospect are ridiculously lopsided; from it, the Cardinals gained substantially. Brock successfully replaced Musial, who had retired at the end of 1963, in left field.

Later that season, a procession of events off the field induced events on the field. Busch, impatient that the team had not caught up with the Philadelphia Phillies, fired GM Bing Devine in August. Although he had considered firing manager Johnny Keane, Busch relented; however, he secretly met with Leo Durocher to offer him the manager position for the next season. Word of the meeting leaked to Keane. Resolutely propelled by Brock, MVP third baseman Ken Boyer and 19-game winner Bob Gibson, the Cardinals beset the Phillies to relinquish a 6 1/2 game lead with 12 to play, and St. Louis won the league pennant. Next, the Cardinals met and defeated the New York Yankees in the 1964 World Series as Gibson was named series MVP. Busch changed his mind about firing Keane after the Series, but Keane, affronted about the way he and Devine were treated, instead accepted the manager position with the Yankees. Red Schoendienst succeeded Keane as manager. Three years later, regretting Devine's firing, Busch successfully negotiated his return with the New York Mets to bring him back as GM.

=== New Busch Stadium and Gibson's historic season (1966–1969) ===
In 1966, the Cardinals moved to the just-completed Busch Memorial Stadium and hosted the MLB All-Star Game that summer. Behind the performance of MVP Orlando Cepeda the next year, St. Louis won 101 regular season games, the league, and the World Series over the Red Sox. Gibson pitched three complete-game wins - allowing just three earned runs - and was named World Series MVP for the second time. In 1968 - nicknamed the "Year of the Pitcher" because of the domination of pitching over hitting throughout the majors - Gibson proved to be the most dominant of all. His earned run average of 1.12 is a live-ball era record (he allowed only 38 earned runs in 304 2/3 innings pitched), garnering him both the NL Cy Young Award and the NL MVP Award. Fueled by Gibson's historic season, the Cardinals led the Major Leagues in staff ERA at 2.49 and faced the Detroit Tigers in the World Series. Gibson again pitched three complete games and set a World Series record with 35 strikeouts, including a single-game World Series record 17 in Game 1, but ended up losing the deciding Game 7.

Following the 1968 season, Major League Baseball implemented realignment by splitting both the National and the American Leagues into "East" and "West" divisions to coincide with the expansion of four teams. The Cardinals, along with the Chicago Cubs, were placed in the National League East division, thus helping to maintain the strength of their rivalry.

== Schoendienst, Brock and Simmons (1970s) ==
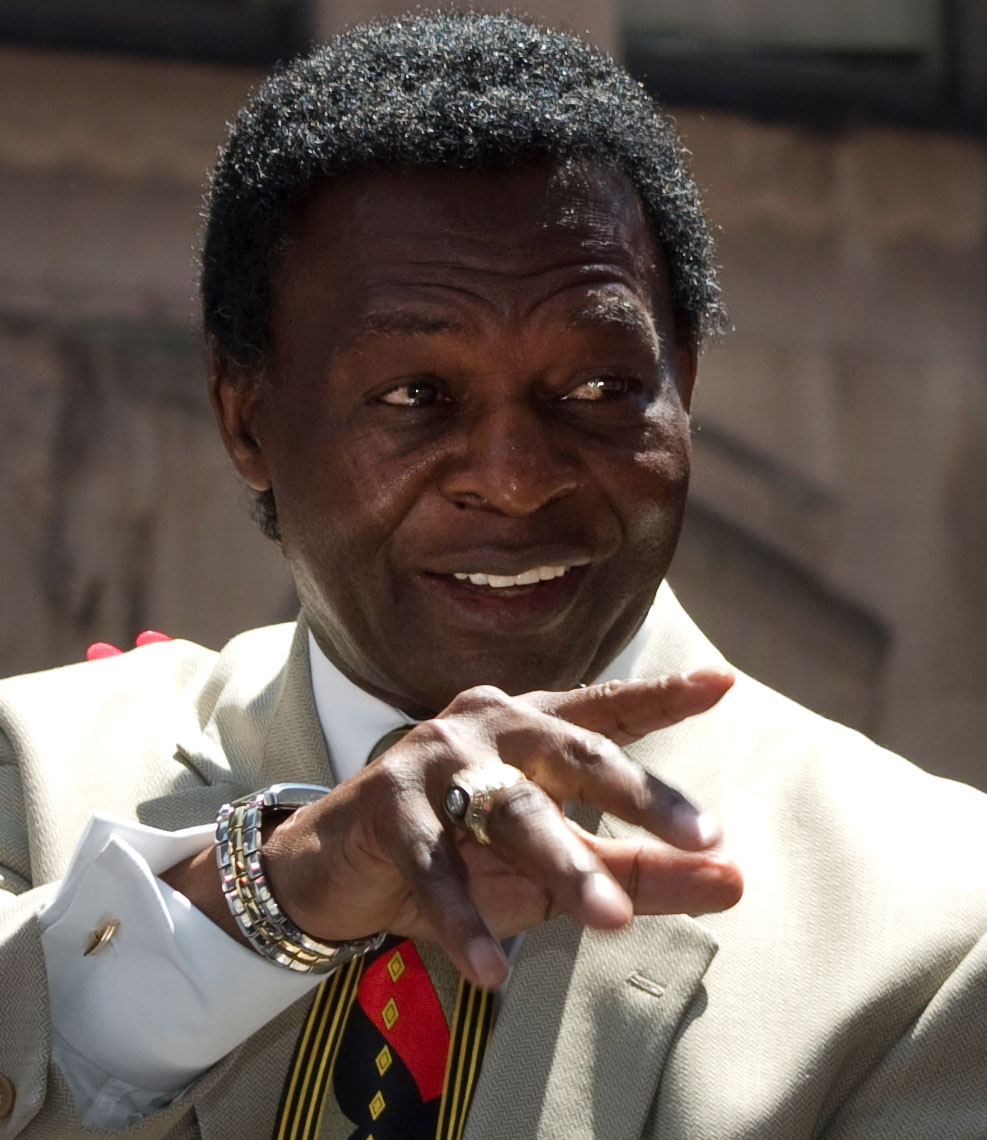
Lou Brock owns the franchise stolen base record.

Although the Cardinals remained competitive in the 1970s, their best season was 1971, when they won 90 games and finished second in the NL East. They also finished second in 1973 and 1974 and with a .500 record or better six times. The decade featured crucial links to the division rival Philadelphia Phillies. First, before the 1970 season, Flood refused a trade to Philadelphia, challenging the reserve clause and eventually helping to bring about free agency. Second, due to a salary dispute, Steve Carlton was traded to the Phillies for fellow pitcher Rick Wise, which like the Brock trade turned out to be lopsided, but this time left the Cardinals on the wrong end. Led by Carlton, the Phillies won three division titles before the end of the decade. Gibson won a second Cy Young Award in 1970, and Joe Torre and Keith Hernández each won a NL MVP Award in 1971 and 1979 respectively. Ted Simmons became one of the top hitting catchers in team history, batting .298, finishing in the top ten in team history in home runs, RBIs, extra base hits, walks, among others; and appearing in six All-Star games and receiving MVP votes six times. Gibson retired as the franchise career leader, among other categories, in wins (251), strikeouts (3117) and shutouts (56). Brock set the modern-day (since 1898) stolen base record of 118 in 1974, since eclipsed by only Rickey Henderson in 1982, and is second all-time to Henderson in career stolen bases with 938. Brock also collected his 3,000th hit in 1979, and is the franchise leader in stolen bases (888), and is second in franchise history in hits (2,713) and runs scored (1427).

== The Runnin' Redbirds (1980s) ==
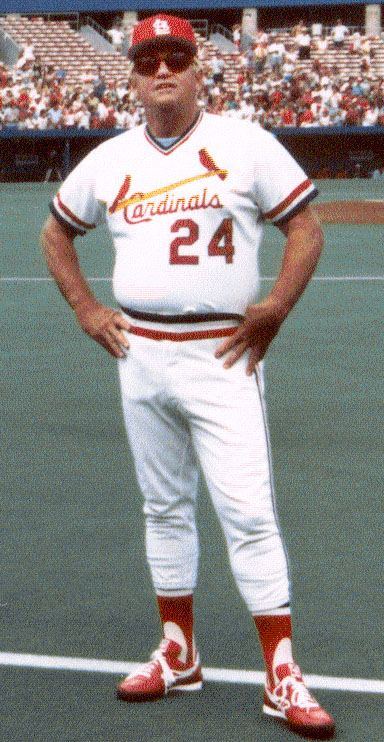
Whitey Herzog managed the Cardinals through the 1980s.

In 1980, Busch hired Whitey Herzog to manage the Cardinals. He became known for a style of play known as Whiteyball that catered to Busch Stadium's Astroturf to maximize speed, defense and pitching. Herzog's multifaceted operations emphasized pitching, line drive gap hitters for the exaggerated bouncing effects of the Astroturf, working the count to get on base, stealing bases, the hit and run, hitting the ball the other way, bunting, and smooth, fleet-footed fielders—essentially expanding small ball large. He also built lineups around a primary power hitter, such as Jack Clark, with one or two others for protection. Other players that drove this style of play included outfielders Lonnie Smith, Willie McGee (1985 NL MVP who won two batting titles in a Cardinals uniform), Andy Van Slyke, and Vince Coleman; infielders Keith Hernández, George Hendrick, Terry Pendleton, José Oquendo, Darrell Porter, Tom Herr, and Ozzie Smith; and pitchers John Tudor, Bruce Sutter, Bob Forsch and Joaquín Andújar. One of the most successful managers in team history, Herzog's Cardinals operated on lower payrolls and won the league three times and the World Series once.

=== Almost champions (1980–1981) ===
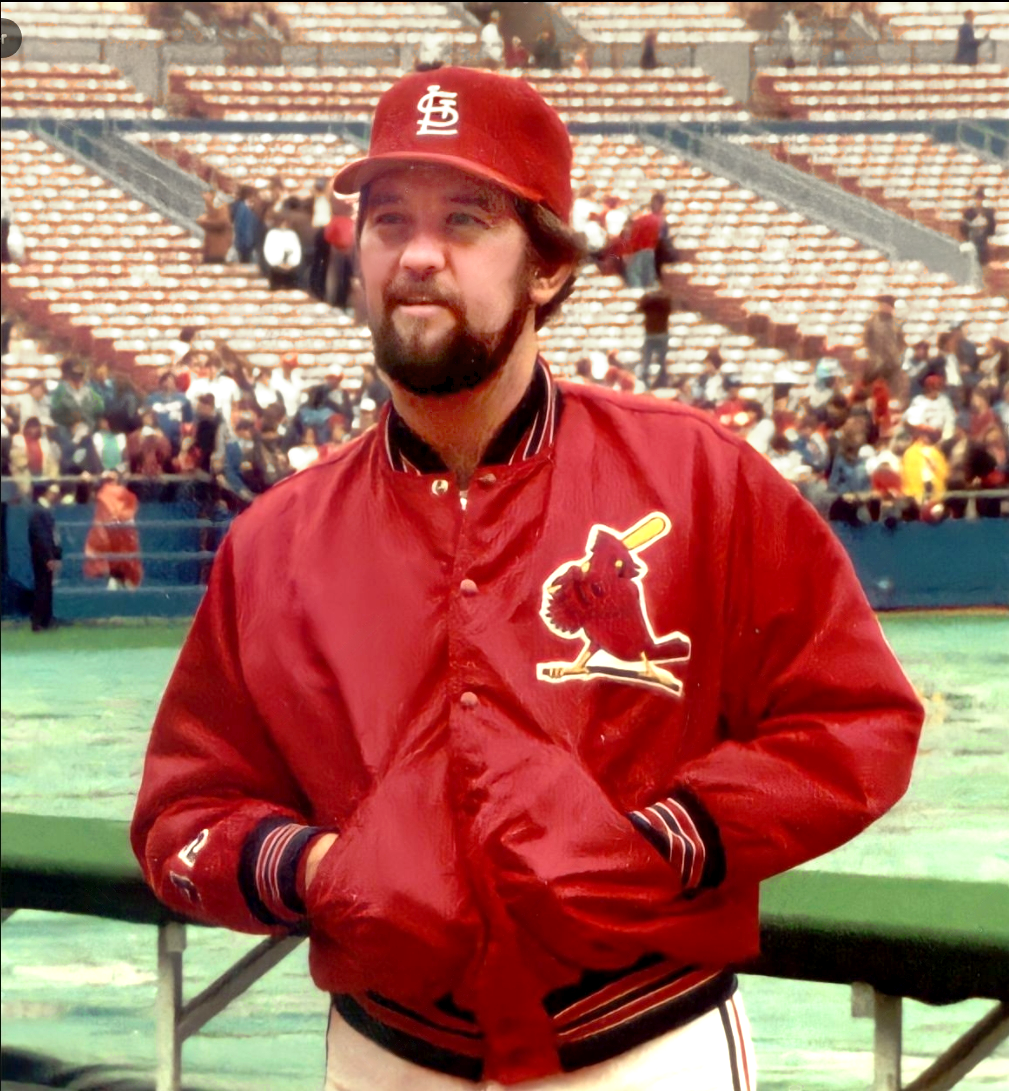
Bruce Sutter helped anchor the Cardinals relief corps, saving 132 games.

The 1980 team featured one of the best offensive units in the league. They paced the NL in eight offensive categories including runs scored (738), batting average (.275), on-base percentage (.328), slugging percentage (.400) and featured six players who tallied 275 plate appearances or more and hit over .300. Thus the 1980 Cardinals set the record for the most Silver Slugger Award winners in one season (five) in the award's inaugural season: Hernández (first base), Garry Templeton (shortstop), Hendrick (outfielder), Ted Simmons (catcher), and Forsch (pitcher). However, they were an overall disappointment, finishing last in pitching and going through four managers. St. Louis returned to their winning ways in 1981, but missed the playoffs in the strike-shortened season despite posting the best overall record in the NL East (59–43). A one year-only change in the playoff format declared two half-season division champions rather than one division champion at the end of the season. The Cardinals finished in second place in each half of the split season.

Between 1981 and 1984, Sutter saved 132 games and twice finished in third place in the Cy Young Award balloting. Forsch, Tudor, and Joaquín each anchored the Cardinals' rotation. Joaquín won 20 or more games in both 1984 and 1985.

=== Peak of the Whiteyball era (1982–1987) ===
Just like in 1964, another key trade significantly altered the direction of the franchise and propelled the Cardinals back to the top. Before the 1982 season, the Cardinals swapped shortstops with the San Diego Padres: Templeton was shipped for Ozzie Smith, another player for whom the Whiteyball strategy was tailor-made: "The Wizard" won thirteen Gold Gloves. The Cardinals won the 1982 World Series over the Milwaukee Brewers. For his hitting excellence in the NLCS (.556 batting average) and the World Series, Porter was awarded both the NLCS MVP and the World Series MVP.

On September 26, 1983, Forsch hurled his second career no-hitter as a Cardinal, becoming the first and only player in team history to do so. That season, the Cardinals set a team record with 207 stolen bases. The next season, on their way to again breaking their stolen bases (220), the Cardinals also became the first team since the 1916 St. Louis Browns to record 200 or more stolen bases three years in a row.

==== I-70 Series showdown (1985) ====
In 1985, the Cardinals met cross-state rivals Kansas City Royals for the first time in a non-exhibition setting. They won 101 regular-season games and the league behind the MVP performance of center fielder Willie McGee (he led the league in batting (.353), triples (18) and hits (216)), and Tudor's 21 wins and 10 shutouts. Rookie of the Year left fielder Vince Coleman dramatically increased the speed of an already larcenous team, pilfering a major-league leading 110 bases on the way to a new team record of 314. After defeating the Los Angeles Dodgers in the 1985 NLCS, the Cardinals reached the World Series to face the Royals. The series was nicknamed the "I-70 Series" after the highway that connects the two in-state rivals.

The Royals won in seven games, but the infamous blown call by umpire Don Denkinger in Game 6 proved pivotal. In the 9th inning, the Cardinals, who had a 3 games to 2 advantage over the Royals, were leading 1–0 and three outs away from winning the Series when Denkinger's call on a play at first base sparked a Kansas City rally. The Royals won the game by a score of 2–1, and went on to defeat the Cardinals in the seventh and deciding game. Incidentally, after the Cardinals traded outfielder Lonnie Smith to the Royals on May 17, he stung them for a .333 batting average in the Series.

==== League champions again (1987) ====
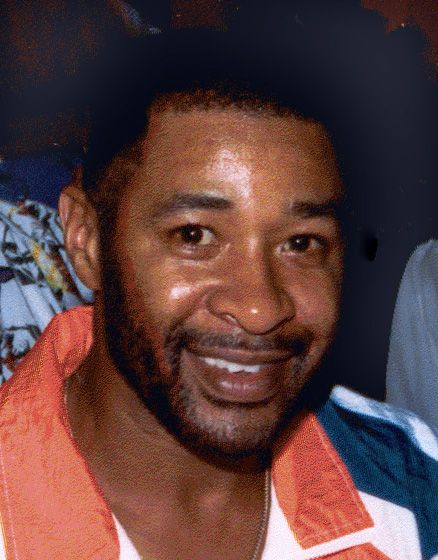
Ozzie Smith, integral to three World Series appearances, set numerous fielding records.

In 1987, Herzog made McGee his number-five hitter, and he responded well to this unconventional choice, driving in 105 runs despite hitting only 11 home runs. Coleman became the first player to steal 100 or more bases in each of his first three seasons in the major leagues. The Cardinals reached the 1987 World Series, losing to the Minnesota Twins in seven games. Decimated by injuries to key players such as Clark and Pendleton, St. Louis found it difficult to keep up with the high-powered Twins offense. This series was the first World Series in which the home team won every game—it happened again four years later when the Twins defeated the Atlanta Braves. It was also the only World Series where one pitcher started Games One and Seven, but none of the others in between—that was rookie Joe Magrane.

In 1989, Coleman registered yet another stolen base record by swiping 50 consecutive bases without being caught. Pedro Guerrero led the team with .311 batting average and 117 RBIs and batted .400 with runners in scoring position. That year, the team set a then-attendance record of 3,080,980. In September, Busch died, concluding the longest tenure of ownership in team history at 37 years. The brewery assumed control of the team, but the Cardinals' competitiveness had started to ebb and continued to do so until AB sold them in 1995.

Herzog continued managing the Cardinals until abruptly resigning less than one year after Busch's death. In addition to the World Series title and three NL pennants, Herzog won the 1985 NL Manager of the Year award and guided the Cardinals to 822 regular season wins against 728 losses for a .530 winning percentage.

== Franchise timeline ==
For the next historic period, see: 1990–present.

1875–1919 | 1920–1952 | 1953–1989 | 1990–present
