= History of the St. Louis Cardinals (1920–1952) =

The St. Louis Cardinals, a professional baseball franchise based in St. Louis, Missouri, compete in the National League (NL) of Major League Baseball (MLB). After decades of early futility in the National League, St. Louis baseball encountered a renaissance with 11 World Series titles and 18 National League pennants since 1926. Sam Breadon's purchase of the majority stake in the club in 1920 spurred this revival; he then assumed the role as team president and assigned the young, enterprising Branch Rickey as his business manager, functioning as a prototype of today's general manager. In his tenure as owner until 1947, Breadon's Cardinals won nine NL pennants and six World Series titles. During this era in Cardinals franchise history, they also totaled 2,898 wins and 2,171 losses in the regular season for a .572 winning percentage.

== Branch Rickey and Rogers Hornsby (1921–1929) ==
=== Rickey builds the farm system ===
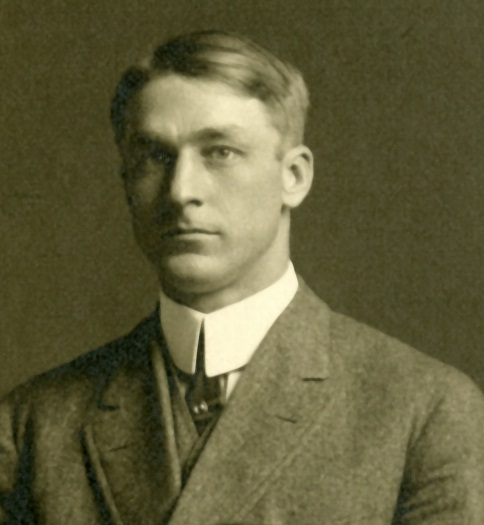
Branch Rickey pioneered the role of the general manager.

After Breadon named Rickey the Cardinals' business manager, he also served as the in-game manager for six uneventful seasons. In 1926, Breadon replaced Rickey with Rogers Hornsby as the field manager to allow him to concentrate fully on the front office. Nicknamed The Mahatma, Rickey began to accumulate knowledge and master the use of scouting and player development and forged connections with D-League and AA teams, known as the "minor leagues". At this time, the minor leagues ran autonomous of the major leagues. To acquire minor league talent, the custom for a major league team was to purchase the player from the minor league team either outright or bid through an auction. As part of a National Agreement in 1921 between the major leagues and minor leagues when federal judge Kenesaw Mountain Landis was hired as the first Commissioner of Baseball in 1920, a ban forbidding major league clubs from owning minor league clubs was lifted. To prevent players from stagnating in the minor leagues and ensure they had the opportunity to advance to major league clubs, Landis implemented a policy that allowed major league clubs to draft players who spent two consecutive seasons on one minor league team.

In 1919, Rickey purchased an eighteen percent stake in the Texas League club Houston Buffaloes, then acquired interests in players in two minor leagues and a number of other teams. From these connections, Rickey blueprinted and revolutionized a farm system––an assembly line of young talent in the minor leagues which allowed the Cardinals to develop without risk of interference or losing them to other major league clubs. His approach to "farming prospects" supplanted the practice of bidding to acquire top minor league players from independent teams and allowed control of minor leaguers and their development at little cost. To fund the further establishment of the Cardinals farm system, Rickey sold the Cardinals' ballpark, Robison Field––which had become riddled with defects over the years––and moved the club across town to Sportsman's Park to become tenants of their American League rivals, the Browns. The Cardinals farm system proved so successful that it led to the franchise's second golden era that persisted throughout Breadon's tenure, including nine World Series appearances between 1926 and 1946. All other 15 major league clubs followed suit, and it is a practice still employed by all Major League teams today and other major professional sports. For this, Rickey is credited with expanding many of the operational and player development techniques that overlap what is common to today's general manager.

Rickey's development of the Cardinals minor league system invariably did not elude its share of obstacles. Landis disliked the farm system model as he felt that it damaged the fabric of baseball by mitigating competitive gamesmanship for pennant races and lionizing season-long exhibition play. Soon after his appointment as commissioner, Landis caught owners off guard by implementing a policy requiring major league clubs to disclose their minor league interests. The primary goal of this policy was to discourage "covering up", or the act of major league teams switching players between two minor league clubs without the intention of actually promoting them in order to make them ineligible for the draft. Landis also censured major league clubs from controlling two affiliates within the same league. It was by reason of an arrangement in this fashion that Landis declared future Hall of Famer Chuck Klein a free agent upon discovering the Cardinals owned affiliates in Dayton and Fort Wayne that played in the same league.

One of Rickey's recruits for the Browns, George Sisler, became a major star in the early 1920s. Outdrawing their tenants substantially, the Browns came within one game of the AL pennant in 1922. However, the tide was about to turn in the Cardinals' favor. After confidently predicting there would be a World Series in Sportsman's Park by 1926, Browns owner Phil Ball invested in extensive upgrades in its anticipation, including increasing the park's capacity from 18,000 to 30,000. Ball was correct––a World Series was about to be played in Sportsman's Park in 1926—but one of the participants did not include the Browns.

=== St. Louis returns to the top ===
Longtime starting pitcher Jesse Haines débuted with the Cardinals in 1920, registering just above 300 innings that year. He won 210 career games in his career and was instrumental in the Cardinals' World Series wins in 1926, 1931 and 1934.

Led by Hornsby on the field, winner of Triple Crowns in both 1922 and 1925, the Cardinals transformed into serious contenders. Nicknamed Rajah for his leadership as a player-manager, Hornsby took home the MVP honors in 1925, becoming the first in franchise history to do so. He also led the National League in batting average six straight seasons from 1920 to 1925, including .424 in 1924––which has not been matched since––three times hit over .400, and is the only player to hit over 40 home runs with a .400 batting average in a season (1922). Hornsby is generally considered the best-hitting second baseman of all time, and his .358 lifetime batting average is second only to Ty Cobb.

Concurrent with Hornsby's hitting, St. Louis won their first National League pennant in 1926 and faced the New York Yankees in a World Series that lasted seven games. Of the eight original National League teams, St. Louis was the last to win the league championship. Grover Cleveland Alexander, brought over from the Cubs in a trade earlier that season, won Games 2 and 6. Game 7 climaxed into a match as Hornsby summoned him to relieve Haines with the bases loaded in the bottom of the seventh inning with a 3–2 lead. Likely still hungover from celebrating his own victory the day before, Alexander faced Tony Lazzeri, who scorched a long foul ball that had the distance to be a home run. However, Lazzeri struck out on a low-and-away curveball to end the threat. It was also a guarded secret that both men suffered from epilepsy. With the Cardinals still clinging to a 3–2 lead in the bottom of the ninth, the Yankees again threatened. Babe Ruth drew a two-out walk but was thrown out attempting to steal second base to end the game, giving the Cardinals their first World Series win and first interleague championship in forty years.

Due to constant conflicts, Breadon traded Hornsby to the New York Giants after the Cardinals' World Series win for fellow second baseman Frankie Frisch. The 1926 NL MVP Bob O'Farrell––the first catcher to win an MVP––took over as player-manager, but the Cardinals fells short of the pennant in 1927. Breadon again traded the manager after the season, complaining O'Farrell kept pitchers in games too long and that the Cardinals did not win the pennant. The Cardinals claimed the next NL pennant in 1928, edging the powerful New York Giants by two games and the Chicago Cubs by four. Ironically, the pitching staff completed 83 games and Jim Bottomley won the MVP, pacing the National League with 93 extra base hits, including 31 home runs, 20 triples, and 136 RBIs.

With the Cardinals collecting momentum as a National League powerhouse, they created a stir in St. Louis not consistently seen since their four consecutive pennants in the American Association. However, the New York Giants and familiar rivals the Chicago Cubs showed themselves as co-adversaries in a newly emerging and tightly contested NL regime. Between 1926 and 1946, the three teams combined for 17 of the 21 pennants.

== Dizzy Dean and the Gashouse Gang take a World Series (1930–1934) ==
The Cardinals kept winning in the next decade, claiming back-to-back pennants in 1930 and 1931, with Frisch taking MVP honors in 1931. On the last day of the 1930 season, Jay Hanna Dizzy Dean made his Major League debut, pitching a complete-game, three-hit shutout. The 1930 Cardinals are the only team in history featuring all players who totaled at least 300 at-bats also batting at least .300, and are the last National League team to score 1,000 runs in a season with 1,004. Matching up with the Philadelphia Athletics in both World Series, St. Louis lost in 1930 but won the 1931 series. In the 1931 series, Pepper Martin's 12 hits, four doubles and five stolen bases spurred an otherwise dismal offense.

Dean starred for the Cardinals as one of baseball's premier pitchers from 1932 to 1937, with four All-Star Games, leading the NL in wins and shutouts twice, strikeouts four times, complete games and innings pitched three times, while procuring an MVP award with two runner-up finishes. He also carried a distinctive persona when off the mound. Dean was a robust, zany, quasi-Yogi Berra-prototype who uttered such memorable quotes as, "It ain't bragging if you can do it", "Son, what kind of pitch would you like to miss?", "He slud into third", "I ain't what I used to be, but who the hell is?", "The doctors x-rayed my head and found nothing", "The good Lord was good to me. He gave me a strong body, a good right arm, and a weak mind", and "It puzzles me how they know what corners are good for filling stations. Just how did they know gas and oil was under there?" His uninhibited nature and willingness to become a lightning rod for criticism garnered massive popularity with teammates, fans and media alike. After retiring as a player, Dean augmented even more popularity as a sportscaster and was elected to the Hall of Fame in 1953.

After a drop-off into mediocrity in 1932 and 1933, the Gashouse Gang took St. Louis back to the top in 1934. A collection of colorful characters that complemented Dean during the Great Depression, they captivated an audience that far surpassed St. Louis city limits "when people needed a diversion from hard times and economic gloom." Due in part to a strong radio signal, St. Louis gained a status as a "regional team" with their locale as the southern- and westernmost Major League city that lasted until 1955, when the Philadelphia Athletics moved to Kansas City. Coupled with the Cardinals' enormous success in the 1920s and 1930s in contrast with the Browns' dismal play, their popularity spiked.

Nicknamed for their shabby appearances and rough tactics, the Gang featured a lineup with five regulars who batted over .300, ushered by slugging first baseman Ripper Collins, who led the team in sixteen offensive categories and the National League in home runs (35) and slugging percentage (.615). He starred with the Cardinals from 1931 to 1936. The team was also as well known for its players' cartoon-character type nicknames, such as Dizzy and Daffy Dean, Ripper Collins, Joe Ducky Medwick, Frankie The Fordham Flash Frisch, Buster Mills, Pepper Martin, Kiddo Davis, Leo the Lip Durocher, and Wild Bill Hallahan. Dean won 30 games that season, the last National Leaguer to reach that mark, and was awarded MVP. Combined with his brother, rookie Paul Dean, the Deans won 49 games (following Dizzy's spring training prediction of 45), and pitched in 37 of the final 52 games that year. The Cardinals won the 1934 pennant and then the World Series over the Detroit Tigers. Collins contributed four hits in Game 7, and the Dean brothers again starred on the mound, combining for a 4–1 record with 28 strikeouts with a 1.43 ERA. However, the series is also infamously known as the "Garbage Series", made so by Medwick's antics in the during the Cardinals 11–0 Game 7 romp that spurred Tigers fans to throw trash and rotten fruit at him on the field. In the sixth inning, Medwick's hard slide into third baseman Marv Owen was followed by Owen stepping on his foot and a scuffle ensuing. When Medwick took the outfield during the bottom half of the sixth, the Detroit fans reacted by booing and pelting him with garbage for half an hour, thus prompting Commissioner Landis to order his benching for the rest of the game.

== Mize and Medwick power the Cardinals (1935–1940) ==
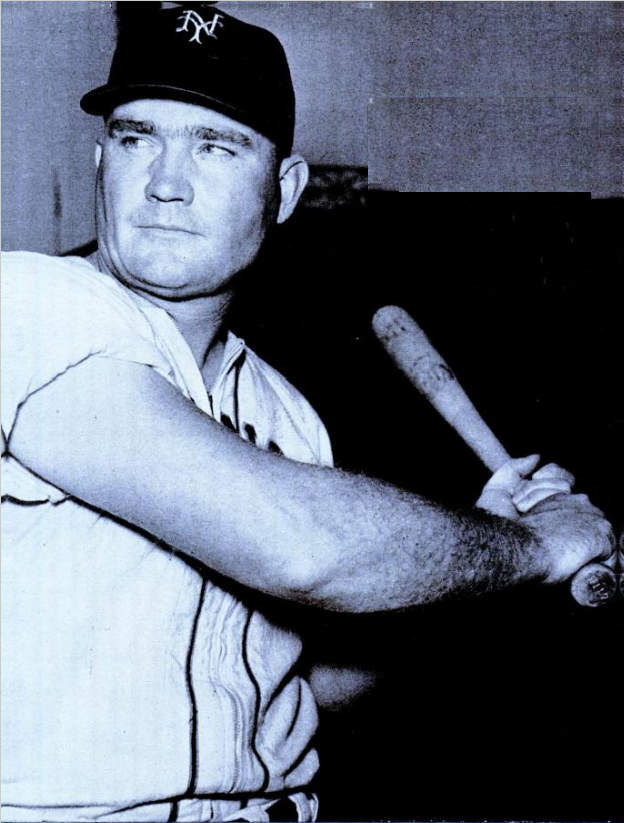
First baseman Johnny Mize twice led the league in home runs and runs batted in as a Cardinal.

With generally competitive play and vigorous hitting from Medwick and first baseman Johnny Mize, the Cardinals finished as high as second place in 1935, 1936 and 1939, highlighted by a 96-win campaign in 1935. The Dean brothers combined for 47 of those wins. However, the Cubs reeled off 21 straight late-season wins––the second-longest win-streak in Major League history––to overtake the Cardinals and capture the NL pennant with 100 wins. Medwick won the MVP and Triple Crown in 1937, the last National Leaguer to achieve the feat, batting .374 with 154 RBIs, 237 hits, and 56 doubles. In the 1937 All-Star Game, Dizzy Dean broke his toe, forcing him to alter his pitching motion, which sapped the power on his fastball, thus precipitating the decline of his playing career.

As the Cardinals farm system continued to develop talent and fuel the success of the major league club, Landis remained disinclined to accept the procession of major league clubs developing their own minor league farm systems. Although his hope persisted that Rickey's plan would become financially burdensome or founder by some other means, Landis had little choice except to refrain from interference. Upon discovering that the Cardinals controlled multiple teams competing in the same league in 1938, Landis released more than 70 players. As very few were likely to be bound for the major leagues, Landis' act had little effect in slowing the march of Cardinals prospects to the major leagues who provided the core players for the Cardinals' three World Series titles the next decade. One notable exception was Pete Reiser, whom Larry McPhail made a pact with Rickey to swap back. However, upon seeing Reiser's talent, McPhail reneged on his promise. Reiser went on to win the NL batting title with a .343 batting average as a member the 1942 Brooklyn Dodgers. Despite Landis' zealous opposition toward the farm system model, his intentions––although misplaced––were in the benevolence of the game, according to Rob Neyer.

To bring the Cardinals back to the top, Breadon appointed fiery competitor and former outfielder Ray Blades as manager in 1939, and the team responded by staying in the pennant race. Emphasizing speed, the Cardinals led the National League in batting average (.294), runs, doubles and triples. However, Blades' confrontational style and volatile temper proved unpopular with the players and press, and Breadon fired him after St. Louis lost 24 of their first 38 games of the 1940 season. By the end of the season, Breadon hired Billy Southworth to manage. Given a second chance with the Cardinals, the Cardinals responded with a third-place finish in winning 69 of their final 109 games for a .633 winning percentage after his rehire. Mize broke Hornsby's club record of 42 home runs set in 1922 with 43, which stood until 1998 when Mark McGwire hit 70. Mize is still the Cardinals' single-season leader in home runs and RBIs (137 in 1940) for left-handers and three home run games (4). At this point, Rickey's farm system burgeoned with another generation of mainstays who proved to be vital to an era of greater success that lay ahead for the Cardinals––including Marty Marion, Enos Slaughter, Mort Cooper, Walker Cooper, Stan Musial, Max Lanier, Whitey Kurowski, Red Schoendienst and Johnny Beazley.

== Stan "The Man" Musial (1941–1952) ==
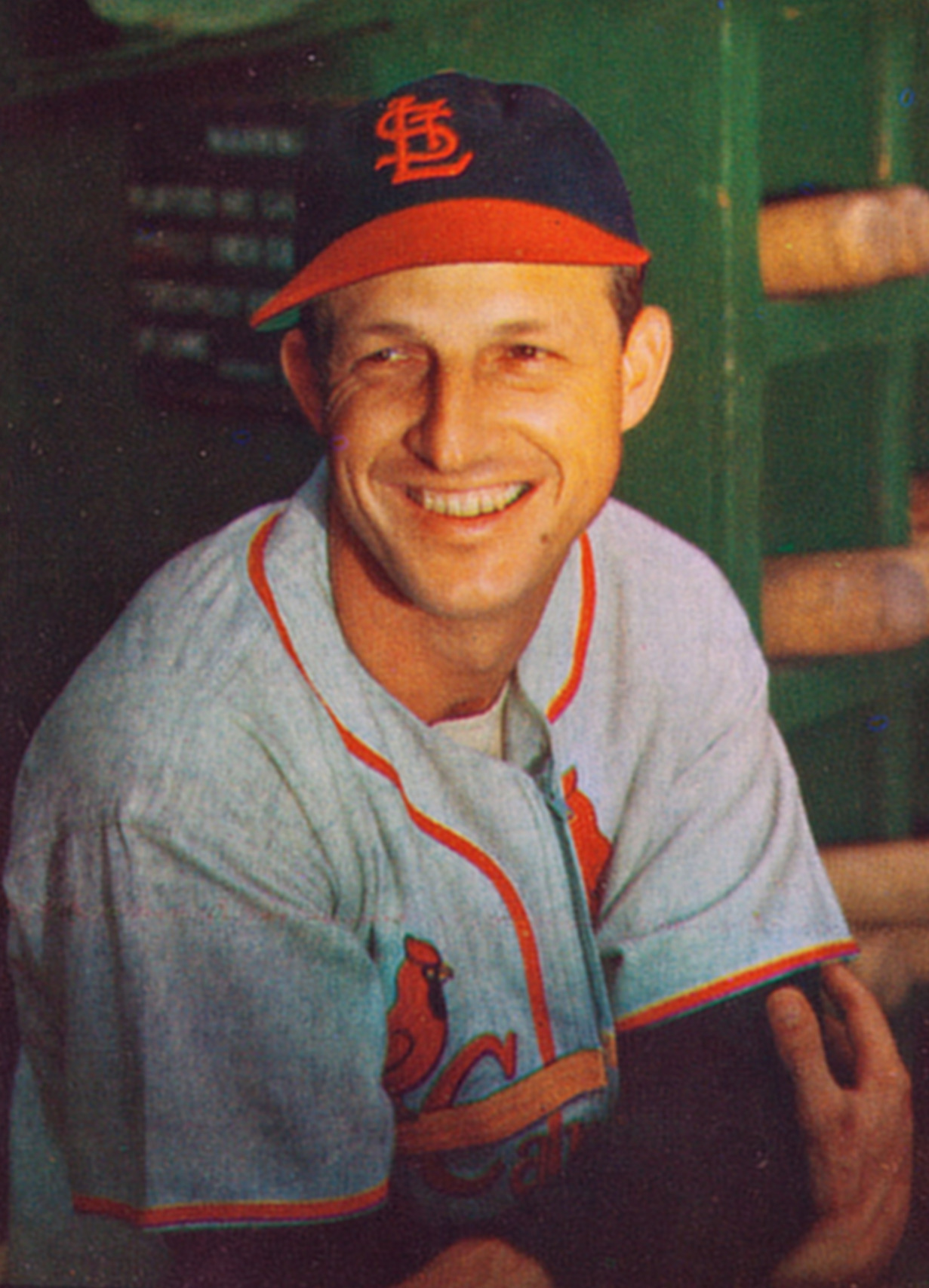
Stan Musial has become the most recognized name for the St. Louis Cardinals and is also considered to be the most consistent hitter of his era.

The Cardinals found their way back onto the World Series stage in the 1940s thanks in part to the promotion of their minor leaguers, including outfielder Stan Musial, who joined the Cardinals late in 1941. Perhaps the most accomplished player in franchise history, Stan The Man spent all his 22 seasons in a Cardinal uniform and won three NL MVP Awards, followed by a surfeit of team records, 17 National League and 29 Major League hitting records. However, his reputation as a fan favorite far surpassed his on-field performance many years after retiring: "Probably the most popular [Cardinals] player", he was remembered "as scandal-free", congenial in every instance, "eager to play", and "enjoyed doing magic tricks for kids and was fond of pulling a harmonica out to entertain crowds. ... Musial struck a chord with fans throughout America's heartland and beyond." With Musial as one of the Cardinals' many young stars, the club embarked on one of the finest three-year stretches of all time, equalling or surpassing the 105-win mark each year from 1942 to 1944. The 1940s was one of the most successful decades in franchise history, as they finished with 960 wins 580 losses for a winning percentage higher than any other Major League team at .623. The New York Yankees were second at .604 and the Brooklyn Dodgers third at .581. Except for their 1940 third-place finish, the Cardinals did not finish lower than second any season in the decade and claimed four NL pennants.

=== Three titles in five seasons (1942–1946) ===
==== Three consecutive 105-win seasons and MVPs (1942–1944) ====
Southworth built on his instant success as manager, winning 97 games in 1941 that was good for a second-place finish, due in part to revitalizing the platoon system. Nicknamed the "St. Louis Swifties", the 1942 club won a franchise-record 106 games, racing to the end by winning 43 of their final 51 games. Cooper won 22 games with a 1.78 ERA, and along with Beazley, headlined a pitching staff with an NL-leading 2.35 ERA and ERA+ rating of 135. They did not let relent in the World Series, defeating the New York Yankees.

The on-field success coincided with a disagreement off the field. Due to a rift with Breadon, he did not renew Rickey's contract. Rickey then took the general manager position of the Dodgers in 1942. Starting with the Cardinals when they were more than $175,000 in debt and virtual doormats in the National League, Rickey helped turn the team into a six-time pennant winner during his tenure.

The Cardinals followed up with 105 wins in both 1943 and 1944. The Cardinals fell to the Yankees in the 1943 World Series rematch. Not only did the Cardinals dominate the league and win the pennant in 1942, 1943 and 1944, but a different Cardinal also took home an MVP award each year: In 1942, it was Mort Cooper, in 1943 it was Musial and in 1944 Marty Marion.

Despite still being tenants of the Browns, the Cardinals had long since become St. Louis' favorite team. They outdrew the Browns by such a wide margin that in some years, only the rent from the Cardinals kept the Browns above water. Nonetheless, Breadon chafed at this arrangement, and in the early 1940s made plans to build a park of his own. He set $5 million aside for the stadium, with a five-year deadline before he would be taxed on that fund.

==== An all-St. Louis World Series and first pennant tiebreaker (1945–1946) ====
The 1944 World Series saw the Cardinals meet their crosstown rivals, the St. Louis Browns, the "Streetcar Series" in the first––and so far only––all-St. Louis Word Series. The Cardinals prevailed for their fifth title in the first of two intrastate World Series in which the Cardinals have participated. In 1945, the year in which Musial engaged in World War II, the Cardinals produced 95 wins, just three games behind the NL champion Cubs.

After his son was killed during a flight training exercise as a pilot in the USAAF in Flushing Bay, New York in 1945, Southworth took a lucrative $50,000 contract to manage the Boston Braves the next season, who dramatically improved. Southworth has the highest winning percentage as a manager in modern Cardinals history (.642) and his career winning percentage (.597) is second in modern Major League history only to Joe McCarthy's .614. For all-time career winning percentage, he is second overall to Charlie Comiskey in team history, and fifth overall in Major League history.

Every time Stan came up they chanted, 'Here comes the man!'

— Cardinals traveling secretary Leo Ward relates Dodger fans' nickname for Musial to sportswriter Bob Broeg

Musial's popularity proved to spread past St. Louis and the Midwest. It was the Brooklyn Dodgers fans during the June 23, 1946 game at Ebbets Field who began to call him "The Man". St. Louis Post-Dispatch sportswriter Bob Broeg heard Dodger fans chanting whenever Musial came to bat, but was unable to interpret the words. After the game over dinner, Broeg asked Cardinals traveling secretary Leo Ward if he had understood what the Dodger fans had been chanting. Ward responded, "Every time Stan came up they chanted, 'Here comes the man!'" "'That man,' you mean", Broeg countered. "No, the man", replied Ward. After Broeg disclosed this account in his column, Musial thereafter became known as Stan "The Man".

The Cardinals finished the 1946 season tied with the Dodgers, but claimed the pennant in a first-ever best-of-three playoff series format (2 games to 0), and first-ever playoff or tiebreaker for a pennant. The Cardinals then claimed the World Series championship in seven games against the Boston Red Sox. In the bottom of the eighth inning of Game 7, with the score tied at 3–3, Enos Slaughter scored on his Mad Dash from first base on a double to shallow left-center field to win the game and the series.

=== From Breadon to Busch (1947–1953) ===
After their 1946 Series win, the Cardinals slid back to the middle of the National League while the New York City clubs Brooklyn Dodgers and New York Giants loomed as National League powerhouses, stockpiling such stars as Jackie Robinson, Roy Campanella, Don Newcombe, Willie Mays and Monte Irvin. The Cardinals managed 13 winning seasons from 1947 to 1963, including a .612 winning percentage and 96 wins in 1949, but were unable to realize a first-place finish and did not make a World Series appearance again until 1964.

Spurred in part by Rickey's moves as president of the Dodgers, changes in racial segregation in baseball were afoot. Rickey promoted Robinson to become the first African-American player in the major leagues in six decades. Although many players—including Cardinals players—still taunted black players during this time, Musial and Schoendienst quietly gained notoriety for never doing so. When several Cardinals players conspired a refusal to play against the Dodgers prior to Robinson's first game in St. Louis, Breadon, with support from National League President Ford C. Frick, threatened to suspend the malcontent players. The propositioned boycott desisted.

At the end of the 1947 season, Breadon decided to sell the team. He had still been unable to find land for his planned stadium, and was facing the prospect of having to pay taxes on his stadium fund. However, he would have likely had to sell the team in any event, as he had learned he had terminal prostate cancer. When local tax attorney and real estate investor Fred Saigh got word that the Cardinals were on the market, he met with Breadon and he made an unusual proposal: if Breadon sold him the team, he would not have to pay taxes on his stadium fund. To ease his initial reluctance to make the deal, Saigh brought in former Postmaster General of the United States Robert E. Hannegan as a partner. In late 1947, Breadon sold the club to Saigh and Hannigan for $4 million–a handsome return on his original investment of 30 years earlier. In addition to winning six World Series and nine NL pennants, Breadon also had the highest regular season winning percentage of any owner in franchise history at .570. His teams totaled 2,470 wins and 1,830 losses.

Stricken with heart disease in 1949, Hannegan was forced to sell his share to Saigh and died soon afterward, making Saigh the principal owner of the Cardinals. Meanwhile, Bill Veeck purchased the Browns in 1951 and implemented schemes aimed at driving the Cardinals out of St. Louis, despite the Cardinals outdrawing the Browns 4–1.

Saigh's tenure as sole owner was short-lived. Several questionable tax practices—including the tax dodge he had used to buy the Cardinals—came to light in April 1952, and he pleaded no contest to two lesser counts of tax evasion. Under pressure from Commissioner Frick, and with a 15-month prison sentence looming, Saigh put the Cardinals up for sale rather than face certain expulsion from baseball. For a time, no credible offers surfaced from St. Louis interests, and it looked like the Cardinals would indeed be forced to move out of town. The most promising offer came from a consortium of businessmen in Houston, Texas. The Cardinals owned the Houston Buffaloes of the Texas League; under major-league rules of the time, they also held the major-league rights to Houston. The only question was whether Buffalo Stadium could be upgraded to major-league standards.

=== Sale to Anheuser–Busch ===
However, Saigh ultimately sold the Cardinals to St. Louis-based brewer Anheuser-Busch (A–B). In February 1953, a group of local businessmen, some of whom sat on the company's board of directors, approached company president and chief executive officer Gussie Busch about A–B buying the team. They persuaded Busch to meet with Saigh, who told him that a group of investors from Milwaukee, which at that time did not have a major league team, were seriously considering buying the team. The 55-year-old Busch had not been a big baseball fan, preferring the gentlemanly outdoor sports of hunting, fishing and horseback riding he had grown up taking part in on his family's estate.

But Busch nevertheless saw the company's purchase of the Cardinals as a shrewd business move. It would first increase A–B's sales through the captive market of as many as 30,000 spectators, many of whom would buy a beer or two, at Sportsman's Park on summer afternoons. Indirectly it would also help the company by disadvantaging one local competitor, Griesedieck Brothers, who had long sponsored the team's radio and television broadcasts, leading one of their brands, Falstaff, to outsell A–B's flagship Budweiser in the city of St. Louis itself, which greatly consternated Busch. At the national level, preventing the Cardinals from moving to Milwaukee would also prevent Schlitz and Pabst, the company's two main competitors at that time, from capitalizing on having a local major-league team to use as a promotional platform and similar captive market for beer sales at games. Lastly, it would be favorable for the company's image to have kept the team in St. Louis.

Although Anheuser-Busch's price of $3.75 million was far less than what out-of-town suitors had put on the table, it was long believed that Busch convinced Saigh that civic pride was more important than money. According to A-B historian William Knoedelseder, however, Saigh had preferred from the beginning to sell to St. Louis-based interests, and he was willing to accept a lower offer from a credible buyer who would keep the Cardinals in town. Busch agreed the company would pay $2.5 million for the team and assume $1.25 million of Saigh's debt. In Saigh's five seasons as owner, the Cardinals totaled 428 wins, 341 losses for a .557 winning percentage, the fifth-best overall regular season record in the Major Leagues.

Busch persuaded the company's board to name him team president. Although the Cardinals were officially an A-B subsidiary, Busch would often be described as the team's owner, since he was the face of the team. He further prevailed on A-B's board to spend a combined $1.2 million to buy Sportsman's Park and renovate it. Busch originally wanted to rename it Budweiser Stadium, but baseball commissioner Ford C. Frick vetoed the idea. But there was nothing that said Busch could not name the park after himself, so he chose instead to call it Busch Stadium, the name all Cardinals' home fields have borne in one form or another since.

The sale of the team to a large corporation drew the ire of Colorado U.S. Senator Edwin C. Johnson, who introduced a bill that would have exempted teams owned by beer or liquor manufacturers from the antitrust exemption granted to Major League Baseball by the Supreme Court. He argued that Busch had bought the team solely to sell beer, and that as a result other companies would have to buy baseball teams to remain competitive, leading to monopolies in both businesses. When it was pointed out to him that no one had objected to brewer Jacob Ruppert's ownership of the New York Yankees, he responded that Ruppert had always kept both businesses separate.

However, Johnson's position was undermined by his own conflicts of interest: he was commissioner of the Western League, in which capacity he had worried that A–B's plans to increase the Cardinals' television broadcast footprint would hurt attendance. His son-in-law also owned that league's Denver Bears, and one of that team's directors was Adolph Coors, owner of the Coors Brewing Company, one of the largest brewers in the West at that time.

At a subcommittee hearing on the bill, Johnson maintained that the sale was bad for baseball. The game would be reduced to "a contest between big businesses", he testified. National League president Warren Giles countered that it had helped bring stability to the game, and Busch himself, the only brewer to appear before the subcommittee, said that the company did not need to own the team to be successful—in fact, if someone made him a good offer for the team, he was open to selling to anyone who would keep the Cardinals in St. Louis. After the testimony, both Missouri senator Stuart Symington and Everett Dirksen, from neighboring Illinois, praised Busch, and Johnson withdrew his bill, saying he had achieved his purpose of raising awareness of the possible dangers of allowing corporate ownership of baseball teams.
For the next historic period, see: 1953–1989.

1875–1919 | 1920–1952 | 1953–1989 | 1990–present
