= List of St. Louis Cardinals no-hitters =

The St. Louis Cardinals are a Major League Baseball franchise based in St. Louis Missouri. They play in the National League Central division. Also known in their early years as the "St. Louis Brown Stockings" (1882), "St. Louis Browns" (1883–1898), and "St. Louis Perfectos" (1899), pitchers for the Cardinals have thrown 10 no-hitters in franchise history. A no-hitter is officially recognized by Major League Baseball only "when a pitcher (or pitchers) allows no hits during the entire course of a game, which consists of at least nine innings", though one or more batters "may reach base via a walk, an error, a hit by pitch, a passed ball or wild pitch on strike three, or catcher's interference". No-hitters of less than nine complete innings were previously recognized by the league as official; however, several rule alterations in 1991 changed the rule to its current form. A perfect game, a special subcategory of no-hitter, has yet to be thrown in Cardinals history. As defined by Major League Baseball, "in a perfect game, no batter reaches any base during the course of the game."

Ted Breitenstein threw the first no-hitter in Cardinals franchise history on his first major league start on October 4, 1891 when the team was known as the "St. Louis Browns"; the most recent no-hitter was thrown by Bud Smith on September 3, 2001.

Two left-handed pitchers have thrown no-hitters in franchise history, while seven were by right-handers. Four no-hitters were thrown at home and six on the road, whilst all ten have been pitched against different opponents. The Cardinals have thrown one no-hitter in April, one in June, one in July, two in August, four in September, and one in October. The longest interval between no-hitters was between the games pitched by Breitenstein and Jesse Haines, encompassing 32 years, 9 months, and 13 days from October 4, 1891 till August 17, 1924. Conversely, the shortest interval between no-hitters was between the games pitched by Jiménez and Smith, encompassing merely 2 years, 2 months, and 9 days from June 25, 1999 till September 3, 2001.

In none of their ten no-hitters did the Cardinals allow any runs via errors, walks, hit batters or uncaught third strikes. The most baserunners allowed in a no-hitter was by Ray Washburn (in 1968), who allowed five. Of the ten no-hitters, two have been won by a score of 2–0, 3–0, and 5–0, more common than any other results. The largest margin of victory in a no-hitter was an 11–0 win by Bob Gibson in 1971. The smallest margin of victory was a 1–0 win by Jiménez in 2001.

The umpire is also an integral part of any no-hitter. The task of the umpire in a baseball game is to make any decision "which involves judgment, such as, but not limited to, whether a batted ball is fair or foul, whether a pitch is a strike or a ball, or whether a runner is safe or out… [the umpire's judgment on such matters] is final." Part of the duties of the umpire making calls at home plate includes defining the strike zone, which "is defined as that area over homeplate (sic) the upper limit of which is a horizontal line at the midpoint between the top of the shoulders and the top of the uniform pants, and the lower level is a line at the hollow beneath the kneecap." These calls define every baseball game and are therefore integral to the completion of any no-hitter. Eight different umpires presided over each of the franchise's ten no-hitters.

The manager is another integral part of any no-hitter. The tasks of the manager is to determine the starting rotation as well as batting order and defensive lineup every game. Managers choosing the right pitcher and right defensive lineup at a right game at a right place at a right time would contribute to a no-hitter. Eight different managers have led to the franchise's ten no-hitters.

== List of no-hitters in Cardinals history ==
¶	Indicates a perfect game
£	Pitcher was left-handed
*	Member of the National Baseball Hall of Fame and Museum

#	Date	Pitcher	Final score	Base- runners	Opponent	Catcher	Plate umpire	Manager	Notes	Ref
1	October 4, 1891	Ted Breitenstein^{£}	8–0	3	Louisville Colonels	Jack Boyle	Hank O'Day (1)	Charlie Comiskey	First career start; First game of a doubleheader on the final day of the season; First no-hitter in franchise history; First no-hitter at home in franchise history; First left-handed pitcher to throw a no-hitter in franchise history; Largest margin of victory in a franchise's no-hitter; Latest calendar date of franchise's no-hitter	
2	July 17, 1924	Jesse Haines*	5–0	3	Boston Braves	Mike González	Hank O'Day (2)	Branch Rickey	Longest interval between franchise's no-hitters	
3	September 21, 1934	Paul Dean	3–0	1	@ Brooklyn Dodgers	Bill DeLancey	Bill Klem	Frankie Frisch	Second game of a doubleheader. In the first game, Paul's brother Dizzy had a no-hitter for 8 innings but finished with a 3-hit shutout. If that game had ended with a no-hitter, Paul and Dizzy would have been the first brothers to each throw a no-hitter in MLB history.; First MLB no-hitter in 1140 days, the longest gap between no-hitters	
4	August 30, 1941	Lon Warneke	2–0	2	@ Cincinnati Reds	Walker Cooper	Jocko Conlan	Billy Southworth		
5	September 18, 1968	Ray Washburn	2–0	5	@ San Francisco Giants	Johnny Edwards	Bill Jackowski	Red Schoendienst (1)	The previous day in the same park, the Giants no-hit the Cardinals; Most baserunners allowed in a franchise's no-hitters	
6	August 14, 1971	Bob Gibson*	11–0	4	@ Pittsburgh Pirates	Ted Simmons* (1)	Harry Wendelstedt (1)	Red Schoendienst (2)	First no-hitter in Pittsburgh in 64 years; Largest margin of victory in a franchise's no-hitter	
7	April 16, 1978	Bob Forsch (1)	5–0	3	Philadelphia Phillies	Ted Simmons* (2)	Lee Weyer	Vern Rapp	Earliest calendar date of no-hitter in franchise history	
8	September 26, 1983	Bob Forsch (2)	3–0	2	Montreal Expos	Darrell Porter	Harry Wendelstedt (2)	Whitey Herzog	Only baserunners were hit by pitch and reached on error; Most recent no-hitter in St. Louis.	
9	June 25, 1999	José Jiménez	1–0	3	@ Arizona Diamondbacks	Alberto Castillo	Bruce Froemming	Tony La Russa (1)	Smallest margin of victory in a franchise's no-hitter; Ten days later, Jiménez again shut out the Diamondbacks 1–0, allowing only two hits. Randy Johnson was the losing pitcher in both games.; First no-hitter at Chase Field	
10	September 3, 2001	Bud Smith^{£}	4–0	4	@ San Diego Padres	Eli Marrero	Phil Cuzzi	Tony La Russa (2)	Most recent no-hitter in franchise history; Just the previous day, the Yankees' pitcher Mike Mussina lost his perfect game bid with two outs in the ninth inning when Red Sox batter Carl Everett singled. If Mussina had his perfect game, it would have been the fifth time in MLB history for no-hitters to happen two consecutive days (first time since 1968) and first time with one of them being a perfect game.; Shortest interval between no-hitters in franchise history	

== See also ==
- List of Major League Baseball no-hitters
