= History of the St. Louis Cardinals (1990–present) =

The St. Louis Cardinals, a professional baseball franchise based in St. Louis, Missouri, compete in the National League (NL) of Major League Baseball (MLB).

Brewing magnate Gussie Busch's 37-year-long ownership of the club ended with his death in 1989, and his brewery, Anheuser-Busch (AB) took over. In 1995, an investment group led by Drew Baur and William DeWitt, Jr., purchased the team and have owned the club since.

Highlights of this period include the career of shortstop Ozzie Smith, who collected a staggering array of defensive records and awards while mesmerizing fans with his acrobatic talent, performing standing somersaults and flips. In 1998, Mark McGwire and the Chicago Cubs' Sammy Sosa collocated national attention with their chase of Roger Maris' single-season home run record of 61. In addition, McGwire also set numerous team home run records. For the 1990s, the Cardinals captured one division title and finished above .500 five times for a .488 winning percentage

The Baur-DeWitt era continued Busch's and the Cardinals' winning tradition the next decade. Walt Jocketty, with a reputation as a top player developer, became the GM in 1995, and he hired renowned manager Tony La Russa. DeWitt's ownership group oversaw a period of consistent playoff appearances through key acquisitions of players. He also implemented a philosophy of bolstering talent from the minor leagues as the farm system consistently lagged near the bottom in baseball, as noted by publications such as ESPN and Baseball America. From 2000 to 2013, the Cardinals made ten playoff appearances, won two World Series and four NL pennants. With 1,274 regular season wins against 993 losses for a .560 winning percentage, the Cardinals led the National League and were second in MLB only to the New York Yankees. The Cardinals acquired defensive experts and sluggers Jim Edmonds (center fielder) in 2000 and Scott Rolen (third baseman) in 2002. A 13th-round draft pick in Albert Pujols unexpectedly put together one of the most productive ten years in Major League history with a .331 batting average and 408 home runs. Free agent acquisition and pitcher Chris Carpenter led St. Louis' pitching staff into multiple playoff hunts.

However, revelations of the widespread use of banned substances across baseball came to light in the 2000s decade that retroactively exposed McGwire's home run record chase and former pitcher Rick Ankiel's comeback bid as a hitter. Despite the scandals, the Cardinals acquired Matt Holliday, Lance Berkman, Carlos Beltrán and Adam Wainwright to replace Edmonds, Pujols, Rolen and Carpenter. Eventually, McGwire issued a public apology and returned to the Cardinals as the hitting coach. La Russa retired from managing after 2011 with the most wins in franchise history (1,408) and World Series championships (two) and Mike Matheny replaced him. Concurrently, the fruition of a new player development model of which DeWitt pursued contributed greatly to two World Series appearances in 2011 and 2013, such as David Freese putting on rare comeback heroics and Allen Craig compiling a historically high batting average with runners in scoring position.

From 1990 to 2013, St. Louis made 11 total playoff appearances and had a combined record of 2,032 wins and 1,787 losses for a .531 winning percentage, fourth-best among all major league teams in that span.

== Joe Torre and Anheuser-Busch take over (1990–1995) ==
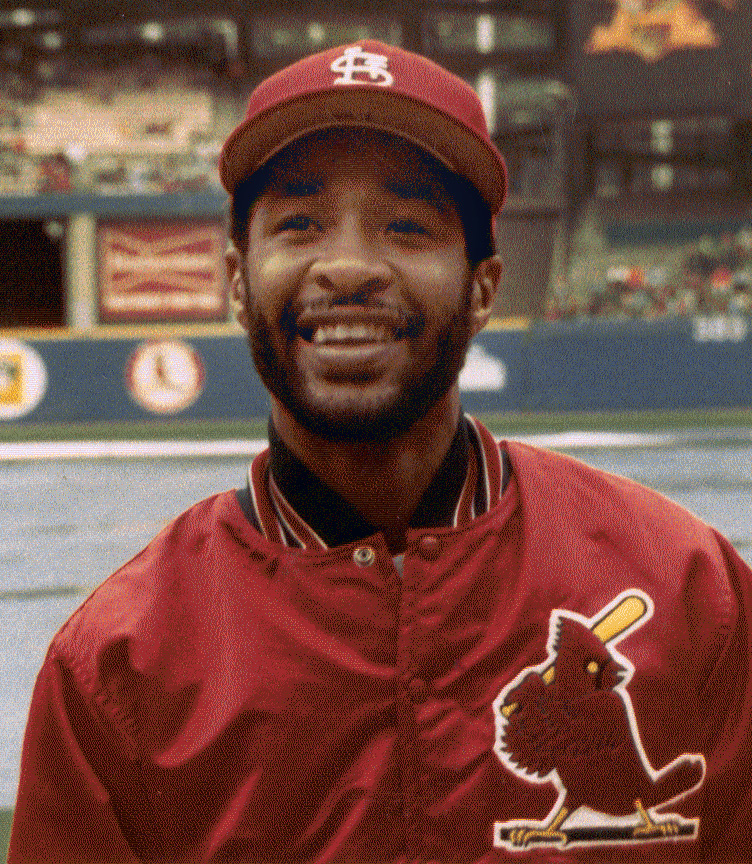
Shortstop Ozzie Smith won eleven Gold Gloves as a Cardinal and thirteen overall in his career.

After Gussie Busch died in 1989, the brewery took primary control of the Cardinals. Former Cardinal catcher and third baseman Joe Torre replaced Whitey Herzog as manager late in the 1990 season after he unexpectedly resigned. Despite an in-season trade to the Oakland A's that season, outfielder Willie McGee attained the requisite number of plate appearances to win his second NL batting title with the Cardinals at .335, making him the only player to win a batting title and end the same season in the other Major League. McGee's batting title was the main highlight in a season where the Cardinals finished last in the division (70–92, .432 winning percentage). It was the first occurrence that they finished last in the standings since 1918 (52–78, .395 winning percentage), when they finished last in the NL when the two leagues had not yet been split into divisions. However, the Atlanta Braves finished with the worst record in the NL (65–97, .401 winning percentage) in 1990. Thus, the Cardinals have avoided finishing last in the entire league every year since 1918, the longest such streak in Major League history and the 1990 season is still their only last place finish in their division.

Starting the next season, the Cardinals commenced a period of playing above expectations and continued a reputation of defensive excellence. Torre's teams won 83 or more games each season in 1991, 1992 and 1993. Shortstop Ozzie Smith, a fan favorite due to his acrobatics, smooth glove and powerful arm, set several defensive records, including the single-season record for fewest errors at shortstop (8) in 1991. He also set career marks at his position games played in 1993, assists (July 14, 1994), and double plays (1,554 on September 15, 1995), and won the Gold Glove every year from 1982 to 1992 with the Cardinals. The accolades did not stop with Smith, however. Between 1978 and 1992, St. Louis were represented with at least one Gold Glove winner each year. On September 7, 1993, Mark Whiten launched four home runs in the second game of a doubleheader against the Cincinnati Reds to go with 12 RBIs, both tying all-time single-game records.

On October 14, 1994, Walt Jocketty replaced Dal Maxvill as general manager. A recommendation for Jocketty came from Tony La Russa, whom he hired as manager later as Cardinals GM. "He's a guy who had all the qualities. A lot of baseball background, business background, willingness to take responsibility, had been mentored by really good people, Sandy Alderson, Bob Gebhard", according to La Russa. After a disappointing finish in 1994 (53–61) and start in 1995 (20–27), Jocketty fired Torre and replaced him on an interim basis with Mike Jorgensen.

In an effort to enhance stock value, Anheuser-Busch (AB) surprised St. Louis by announcing the Cardinals were for sale. They simultaneously announced plans to close a brewery in Tampa Bay and sell off their Eagle Snacks division. However, AB were resolute in their efforts to keep the Cardinals from moving out of St. Louis by selling the team only in a package deal with Busch Memorial Stadium. As a middle market metropolitan area, had AB not moved to create measures to keep the team in St. Louis, chances are they may have been moved to a larger market. AB sold the team at an undervalued price to a partnership headed by Southwest Bank's Drew Baur, Fred Hanser and William DeWitt, Jr. in December 1995. DeWitt has a long track record in baseball, commencing with his father, Bill DeWitt, who once worked for former Cardinals general manager (GM) Branch Rickey and owned the St. Louis Browns. DeWitt himself was a minority owner of the Texas Rangers and actively participated with the baseball clubs on which the elder DeWitt served. Hired during the AB era, the new ownership retained Jocketty.

== Bill DeWitt ownership (1996–present) ==
=== Tony La Russa and Albert Pujols era (1996–2011) ===
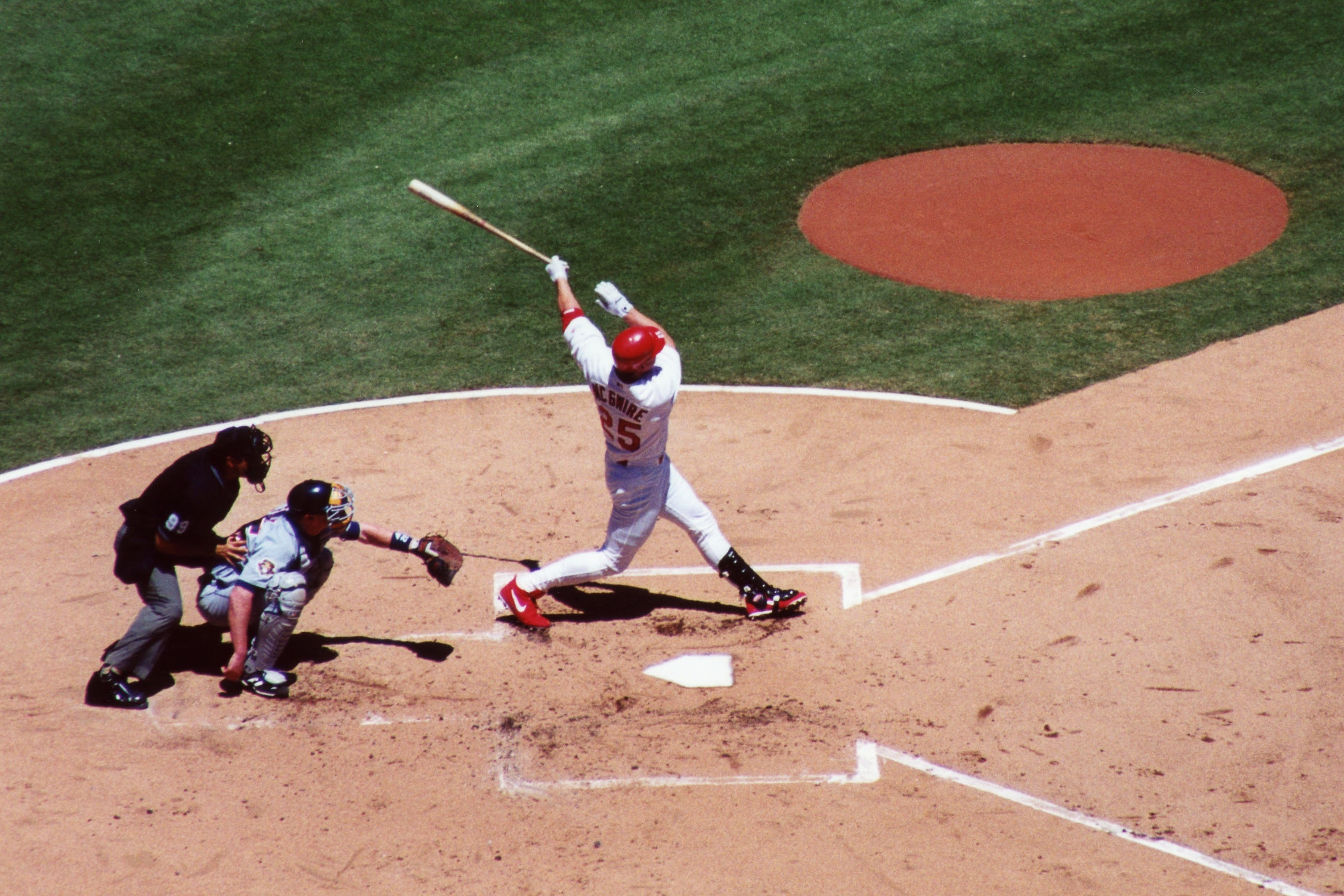
Mark McGwire broke the single-season home run record while playing with St. Louis in 1998.

==== Mediocre Years (1995–1999) ====
One of Jocketty's first moves under new ownership was to hire La Russa away from the Oakland Athletics. La Russa became one of the most successful managers in history owing in part to his quality as a strategically brilliant and a tactical innovator, concocting "inventive bullpen matchups", and "creating the role of the one-inning closer [for] Dennis Eckersley", patterns that are an integral part of the current game. La Russa brought two of his most trusted coaches from Oakland, among others – pitching coach Dave Duncan and first base coach Dave McKay – both of whose coaching tenures in St. Louis coincided with La Russa's term.

St. Louis won the NL Central the following season for their only division title of the decade. Veteran shortstop Ozzie Smith, who never got along with La Russa, announced that 1996 would be his last season. Besides the coaches, several former Athletics players followed La Russa to St. Louis, including Mark McGwire, Eckersley, McGee, and Todd Stottlemyre. McGwire, the record holder for home runs by a rookie with 49 in 1987, set the Cardinals' record for a one-month home run total with 15 in September 1997. In 1998, the Cardinals became the focus of the baseball world as McGwire broke the single-season home run record with 70. His epic pursuit of Roger Maris' record along with the Cubs' Sammy Sosa helped to reenergize baseball with fans following the 1994 strike. In 1999, McGwire followed up with 65 home runs and 147 RBIs, becoming the first Major League player to hit at least 50 home runs in four consecutive seasons.

==== Return to competitiveness (2000–2003) ====
With the new millennium, the Cardinals embarked in a new ambitious era – in part taking advantage of the expanded playoff format including berths for wild card teams. Between 2000 and 2013, St. Louis made ten total playoff appearances. They took seven division titles, three wild card spots, four NL pennants and two World Series championships.

Shortly before the 2000 season, the Cardinals traded for Gold Glove center fielder Jim Edmonds from the California Angels. With dazzling defense and a powerful bat that made him a favorite among Cardinal fans, "Jimmy Baseball" helped spark the Cardinals to playoff berths in six of the next seven years, won eight Gold Glove awards and hit 241 home runs in eight seasons in St. Louis. Edmonds made an immediate impact and raised his production that season, hitting a career-high 42 home runs and winning his third Glove Glove. The Cardinals took advantage of the high-scoring trend around baseball, plating 887 runs on their way to 95 wins and the Central division title. McGwire was lost to a season-ending injury in 2000 with a .305 batting average, 32 home runs, 73 RBIs, a .483 on-base percentage and .746 slugging percentage in 89 games, but St. Louis brought in Will Clark from the Baltimore Orioles, and he stepped in with a .345 batting average, 12 home runs and a .655 slugging percentage. Rick Ankiel, sporting a 94–97 MPH fastball and a "fall-off-the-table" curveball, finished second in both strikeouts per nine innings and the Rookie of the Year balloting. However, an unexplained loss of control in that year's playoffs plagued him until he stopped pitching. Powered by another heralded rookie in Albert Pujols, the Cardinals took the Wild Card the following year. Pujols enjoyed a career start unmatched in the entire history of the game. During his first eleven seasons, he batted .328 with 445 home runs, winning a batting title in 2003 at .359 and home run titles in 2009 and 2010. Third baseman Scott Rolen arrived via trade from the Phillies in 2002. With Edmonds and Pujols, the Cardinals featured three of the best hitters in baseball who were also highly regarded defensive players.

Key acquisitions also bolstered the pitching staff. Darryl Kile posted 20 wins with his trademarked big-breaking curveball in 2000 and raised his performance in 2001, posting a 3.09 ERA. Chris Carpenter was signed as a free agent and Adam Wainwright and Jason Marquis both arrived via trade. Between 2000 and 2002, the Cardinals' seasons ended in two trips in the NLCS. At the end of the 2000 season, The Sporting News named Jocketty Executive of the Year, his first of two such awards with the Cardinals.

However, near-simultaneous tragedies struck in 2002. On June 18, famed longtime Cardinals sportscaster Jack Buck died following health complications. Just four days later, after Cardinals personnel noticed Kile's absence from pregame warmups before a Cubs game, he was found dead in his hotel room. The autopsy revealed the cause of death to be coronary artery disease. That game was postponed, resulting in the first day-night doubleheader in the history of Wrigley Field later in the season. An award was commissioned in his honor.

The avenues from which teams acquired marquée talent started to close and DeWitt, recognizing that he needed to change his club's approach to stay competitive, went about "abandoning a philosophy of chasing big names" that had netted such stars as McGwire, Edmonds, Kile, Édgar Rentería and Rolen. Said DeWitt, "We had great teams in that era, but I knew that that wasn’t sustainable because as that group aged, we would need younger players. With the new labor agreement that was coming in, teams were holding on to their players." He added, "we were opportunistic prior to that by getting players from other clubs, but we made a conscious decision back in the ’03 and ’04 time frame that we were going to throw a lot of resources and make every effort to build from within ... Rather than giving up draft choices, we tried to accumulate draft choices." To avert continual reliance on signing free agents and trading for stars already in their prime, DeWitt sought to place the expertise of people like Jeff Luhnow to create an efficient player development system utilizing the entire organization. DeWitt hired him in 2003 to become the vice president of baseball development. As Luhnow lacked a baseball background, his hire was seen as unconventional, but DeWitt saw potential in the Northwestern graduate with an MBA because of his business background and analytical ability.

==== Two World Series trips, one unlikely title (2004–2006) ====
In the offseason before 2004, St. Louis made key pitching acquisitions that later proved integral in their World Series runs: resigning free agent Chris Carpenter despite not pitching the season before, and bringing in Adam Wainwright and Jason Marquis via trade. Mediocre results characterized a 23–22 start. However, Rolen, Edmonds and Pujols powered the Cardinals to a Major League-best 105 wins, earning the nickname "MV3", as they won 82 of their final 117 games (.700 winning percentage). Each one equaled or surpassed 34 home runs, 102 runs scored, 111 RBIs and a .301 batting average and ranked third, fourth and fifth in the MVP voting. Carpenter lived up to his former top-prospect billing, breaking through with 15 wins and a 3.22 ERA and the pitching staff finished second in the NL in ERA at 3.75. In the NLCS, Edmonds hit a game-winning home run against the Houston Astros. In the World Series, they met a Boston Red Sox squad fresh off four straight victories over the Yankees following an 0–3 deficit in the ALCS. A comeback in this fashion in any North American major sports leagues had previously occurred only in the NHL. Not skipping a beat, the Red Sox swept the Cardinals. Because the American League had home-field advantage as a result of winning the All-Star Game, Busch Memorial Stadium became known as the field where the Curse of the Bambino died. In calling the final out, Fox commentator Joe Buck, himself a Cardinals broadcaster, famously said:

Back to Foulke. Red Sox fans have longed to hear it: The Boston Red Sox are World Champions!

Following the Cardinals' regular season success, The Sporting News named Jocketty to his second Executive of the Year award.

Meanwhile, Major League Baseball found itself on the receiving end of a publicity disaster after the House of Representatives' Government Reform Committee subpoenaed a group of baseball executives and players to testify about the use of anabolic steroids and human growth hormone (HGH) in baseball on March 17, 2005. Collectively, any banned substances classified as or similar to, but not only including, steroids or HGH, became known as performance-enhancing drugs (PEDs). The executives included Commissioner Bud Selig and union head Donald Fehr. The players included Mark McGwire, Sammy Sosa (with whom McGwire shared the chase of Maris' home run record in 1998), Rafael Palmeiro, Roger Clemens and Alex Rodriguez.

Other players, such as Curt Schilling (due to his strident outspokenness against PEDs) and José Canseco (due to his role as a whistleblower), were requested to testify against the epidemic. Congresspeople such as Jim Bunning (a former pitcher), Henry Waxman and Elijah Cummings interrogated the sportsmen. McGwire was apologetic and admissive to a steroid problem within the sport, yet evasive about his own use when confronted, responding with "I'm not here to discuss the past", and "I'm here to be positive about this subject." Sosa, Rodríguez, Palmeiro and Clemens answered with either similar levels of ambiguity or denials. Selig and Fehr defended the policy that was in place, stating they felt it was sufficient. The hearing lasted 11 hours having produced neither any definitive answers besides denials nor any proclamations to make concrete steps to clean up the sport. As a result, Selig, Fehr, the players Congress subpoenaed and any other player suspected of using PEDs became objects of public scorn.

Winning another 100 games and a Central Division title in 2005, Carpenter became the franchise's first Cy Young Award winner since Bob Gibson and Pujols won his first Most Valuable Player (MVP) award. In one calendar year spanning the 45th game of both the 2004–05 seasons, St. Louis won 111 regular season games, a feat matched just four times previously in MLB. However, they fell in an NLCS rematch with the Astros. Despite winning just 83 games in 2006, St. Louis again won the NL Central division crown as they moved into the new Busch Stadium. Wainwright filled in as an emergency closer to save the pennant clincher and struck out 15 in ten playoff innings. In the World Series, the Cardinals defeated the Detroit Tigers in five games. David Eckstein garnered the World Series MVP with a .364 batting average. Their 83 wins represents the second-lowest win total of a league champion (the 1973 NL Champion New York Mets went 82–79) and the lowest win total of a World Series champion (the 1987 Minnesota Twins previously held the record at 85–77). The Cardinals were also the first team since the 1923 New York Yankees to open a new ballpark with a World Series championship in the same season.

==== Franchise transformation and comebacks (2007–2011) ====
After their World Series win in 2006, St. Louis began a period of transition precipitated in part by recent injuries to key players such as Carpenter, Edmonds and Rolen. St. Louis failed to reach the playoffs for two consecutive seasons in 2007 and 2008 for the first time since 1998–99. However, Wainwright started his emergence as a key starting pitcher in 2007, eventually leading the league in wins in 2009 and finishing second in ERA in 2010. The lowest point came when pitcher Josh Hancock died in an early-morning motor vehicle accident on April 29 while intoxicated. More issues followed later in the season. After hitting nine home runs in one month following a call-up from the minor leagues on August 9, the New York Daily News reported that Ankiel had received one year's supply of HGH in his 2004 attempt to come back as a pitcher.

Differences in player development strategies began to undermine Jocketty's efforts as GM. When DeWitt promoted Luhnow to the position of vice president of amateur scouting and player development in 2006, tension arose between the two men as Jocketty perceived that it tacitly meant the Cardinals were looking to divide his authority. Although Jocketty built consistently winning teams since 2000, injuries and age started to erode at the team's core. The Cardinals' farm system was low in fruitfulness and the DeWitt sought to increase the minor league's talent productivity. Concurrently, the trend had been for MLB clubs to dispose of their prospects as trading chips for established star players, as was Jocketty's strategy, but that was changing. Between 2000 and 2007, the highest rank the farm system was recognized was 21st; most of the other years it was in one of lowest three. After the 2007 season, Jocketty and the Cardinals parted ways, and John Mozeliak was named GM. One of Mozeliak's first moves was to trade the immensely popular Edmonds to the San Diego Padres for third baseman David Freese. He also shipped Rolen to the Toronto Blue Jays for third baseman Troy Glaus.

In 2008, Pujols won his second MVP (and a third in 2009) and Ankiel continued his emergence from switching to the outfield from pitching and hit 25 home runs in 120 games. St. Louis defeated the San Diego Padres on August 22, 2009, for the 10,000th win in franchise history dating back to the American Association, becoming only the fourth team to accomplish the feat.^{[a]}

Before the 2010 season, La Russa confirmed that Mark McGwire would become the Cardinals' hitting coach after years of self-induced public exile since retiring as a player in 2001. Months after his hire in January, 2010, he publicly admitted to steroid use through parts of his career, including his home run record-breaking season in 1998, and issued a public apology. Commissioner Selig was pleased with McGwire's announcement, adding that "this statement of contrition I believe will make Mark's re-entry into the game much smoother and easier." La Russa stated that, before that day, he "didn’t know anything. Mark and I never confronted it, and he never told me until this morning." McGwire remarked that during the 2005 Congressional hearings, he was then ready to admit to his steroid use, but lawyers advised against it to attempt to attain immunity.

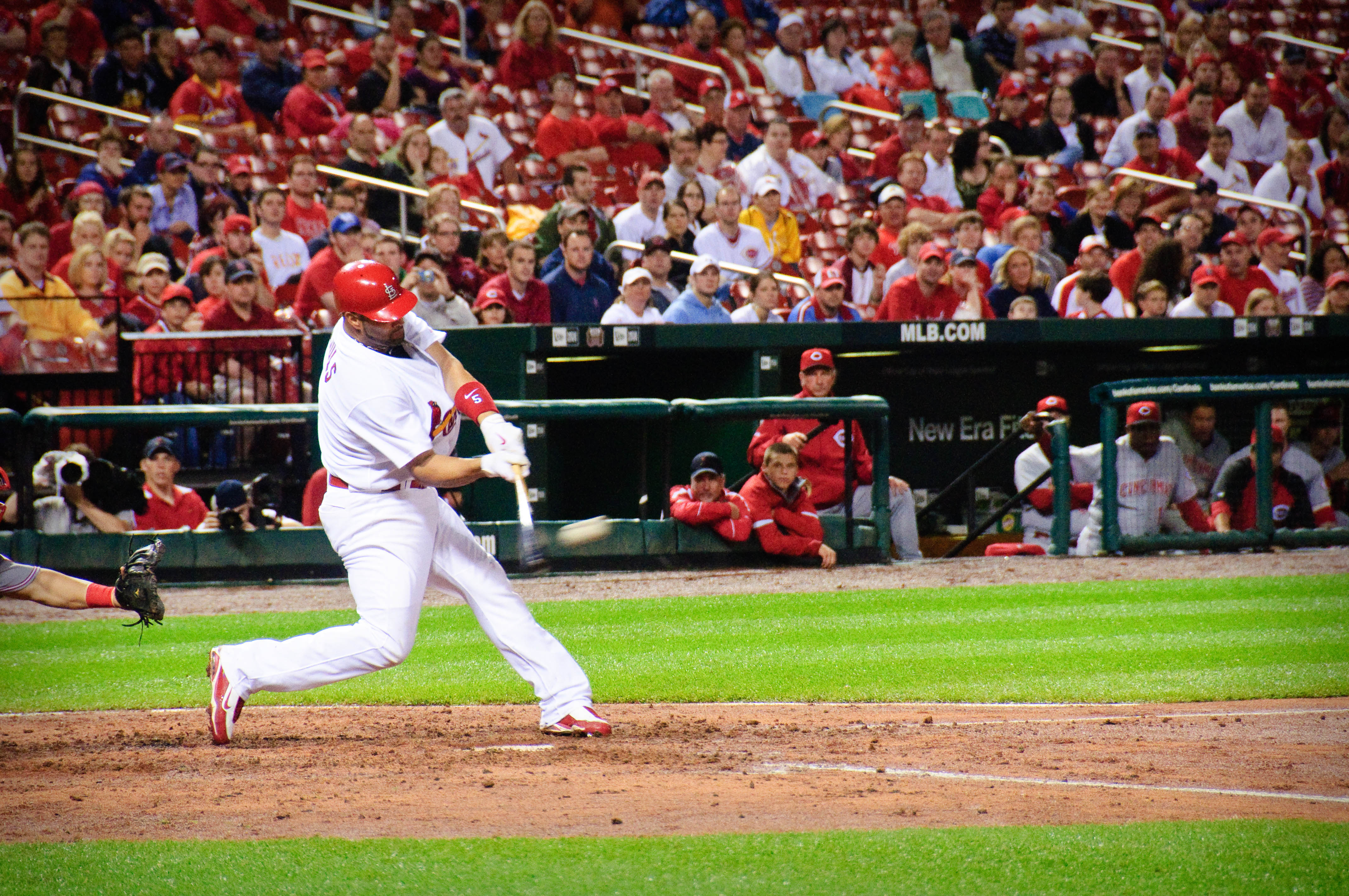
First baseman Albert Pujols bats in April 2010.

The Cardinals returned to the playoffs in 2011 by usurping the Wild Card spot on the final day from the Atlanta Braves after falling 10 1/2 games behind on the 130th game. Thus they completed the largest comeback in history with 32 left to play. Due to their fixtures in different divisions, they played fewer head-to-head games, further lowering Cardinals' odds of catching the Braves. In the NLDS, the Cardinals defeated the Phillies. Game 5 featured a pitching duel between Carpenter and Phillies ace Roy Halladay that became the first NL playoff series to end in a 1–0 score and Carpenter's second complete game shutout clincher of the season. The Cardinals met the Texas Rangers in the World Series. Pujols tied a World Series record in Game 3 by smashing three home runs, joining only Babe Ruth and Reggie Jackson. "Mr. Octo-bert" also tied World Series single-game records for hits, total bases, RBIs, and runs scored. Game 6 nearly saw the Rangers win the Series, but after twice being one strike away from elimination, St. Louis tied both times –– the first such occurrence in MLB history. First, David Freese delivered a triple that drove in two runs in the ninth inning to tie the game, and Berkman followed with a game-tying RBI single in the 10th. Leading off the 11th, Freese hit a walk-off home run to center field.^{[b]} The Cardinals defeated the Rangers in Game 7 to win the Series. Freese's performance garnered him the World Series MVP.

Despite the elation of having won a championship in extraordinary fashion, the offseason events following brought about the appearance the Cardinals franchise were systematically dismantling itself. Three days after the Series ended, La Russa announced his retirement, making him the first manager to end his career with a World Series win and with the most managerial victories (1,408) in franchise history. Pujols declared free agency on October 31. On December 7, the Houston Astros hired Luhnow as their general manager, culminating his rise through the Cardinals ranks as a top player developer. The next day, Pujols ended the bidding war over himself by signing with the Los Angeles Angels of Anaheim for $254 million, the second-highest valued contract in history.

However, not all news was bad. One week later, Baseball America bestowed the Cardinals with their Organization of the Year award for the first time, an award given since 1982. It was given in part to recognize the increased productivity of the Cardinals farm system. Seventeen of the 25 players on the Cardinals' 2011 postseason roster were drafted and developed by the Cardinals. Along with Luhnow, Mozeliak helped fulfill owner Bill DeWitt, Jr.'s mission to make Cardinals' farm system a consistent producer of prospects who would be key in the Major League's club success. Attesting to the award the franchise had just been crowned, the Cardinals later proved they had successfully established a system that could thrive after the departure of three key personnel.

=== The Mike Matheny era (2012–2018) ===
The Cardinals kept winning following the departure of franchise icons La Russa and Pujols. Former Cardinals backstop Mike Matheny became the new Cardinals manager for the 2012 season and onwards. Carlos Beltrán, another free agent signed to replace Pujols before the 2012 season, garnered a Player of the Week award in May after hitting six home runs within a week; he eventually hit 32 for the season. In the playoffs, the Cardinals capitalized on their newfound comeback persona against the Washington Nationals in the NLDS: in the final game, Pete Kozma drove two runs in the ninth inning to win the series after being down 6–0. However, after mounting a 3–1 lead, they fell to the San Francisco Giants in the NLCS. After the season, top publications such as ESPN and Baseball Prospectus continued to tab the Cardinals farm system as one of the top systems in baseball.

Key players from the 2009 draft helped net the Cardinals' the Major League's best regular-season record in 2013, including first baseman Matt Adams, second baseman Matt Carpenter, starting pitchers Joe Kelly and Shelby Miller, and relief pitcher Trevor Rosenthal. DeWitt's goal of using the minor league system as the primary source of talent for a winning team was starting to be realized. One gamble that worked out beyond expectations was moving Carpenter from his natural position of third base to second base, where led the Major Leagues in hits (199), doubles (55) and runs scored (126). His 55 doubles broke the franchise record for left-handed batters Stan Musial previously set in 1953. To make up for injuries and ineffectiveness, St. Louis enlisted 20 rookies, many of whom filled key positions, including Adams, Rosenthal, Miller, Michael Wacha and Carlos Martínez. The Cardinals also set a Major League record by hitting .330 as a team with runners in scoring position (RISP) (a statistic reliably kept since 1974). First baseman Allen Craig led the way at .454, third-highest all-time.^{[c]} The team advanced to the World Series, where they fell to the Boston Red Sox in six games.

The 2014 Cardinals captured their second straight NL Central title with a 90–72 record. They defeated the Los Angeles Dodgers in the NLDS, including two victories against Clayton Kershaw, who would ultimately win both the NL Cy Young and MVP awards for the 2014 season. This marked their fourth-consecutive NLCS appearance, but the Cardinals were unable to defeat the San Francisco Giants, who would go on to beat the Kansas City Royals in the World Series. The following season, the Cardinals won their third straight NL Central title, but lost to their archrival Chicago Cubs in the NLDS, marking their earliest playoff elimination since 2009.

For the first time since the 2007–2008 seasons, the Cardinals missed the playoffs in consecutive years, 2016–2017.

On July 14, 2018 following an 8–2 loss to the Cincinnati Reds, the St. Louis Cardinals announced they had dismissed manager Mike Matheny after 6 1/2 seasons as team skipper.

=== Mike Shildt era (2018–2021) ===
The day after Matheny's dismissal, Mike Shildt was promoted to interim manager and rallied the Cardinals to a 41–28 finish. The Cardinals were in contention for the NL Central and wild-card berths for much of August and September, but wound up missing the postseason for the third consecutive season.

In the 2019 offseason, the Cardinals acquired all-star first baseman Paul Goldschmidt from the Arizona Diamondbacks. Aided by Goldschmidt's bat and pitcher Jack Flaherty's late-season emergence, the Cardinals returned to postseason play with a 91–71 record and an NL Central title. However, they were swept by the eventual World Series champion Washington Nationals in the NLCS.

In the pandemic-shortened 2020 season, the Cardinals finished with a 30–28 record, winding up second in the NL Central. Due to the expanded postseason field that season, the Cardinals' runner-up finish in their division earned them the sixth seed in the 2020 National League Wild Card Series; however, they lost in three games to the San Diego Padres.

In 2021, the Cardinals bolstered their infield and lineup by trading for All-Star third baseman Nolan Arenado from the Colorado Rockies. On September 10, the Cardinals' hopes of returning to the postseason seemed slim, as they had a mediocre 71–69 record and were 3 1/2 games behind in the NL wild card race. However, the Cardinals won a franchise record 17 consecutive games and clinched a wild card berth. They were defeated in the 2021 National League Wild Card Game 3–1 by the Los Angeles Dodgers. Despite their unexpected run to the postseason, the Cardinals fired manager Mike Shildt and replaced him with Oliver Marmol.

=== Oliver Marmol era (2022–present) ===
==== Final season of Pujols and Molina (2022) ====
Prior to the 2022 season, the Cardinals re-signed Albert Pujols as a free agent, after having previously played with the team from 2001 to 2011. It was later announced that Pujols and Yadier Molina would retire following the season, and both players approached a number of historical milestones throughout the season. Molina and Adam Wainwright set a major league record with the most starts and wins by a starting battery, and Molina himself set a league record by recording the most putouts by a catcher. But on September 23, 2022, Pujols made history as only the fourth major league batter to record 700 home runs, finishing his career with 703. In doing so, Pujols joined Hank Aaron as the only batters with 700 home runs and 3,000 hits in their careers. Pujols finished his final season with 24 home runs and a .270 batting average, earning the NL Comeback Player of the Year Award. The Cardinals were carried offensively by NL MVP Paul Goldschmidt (35 HR, 115 RBI, .317 BA, .981 OPS), and Nolan Arenado (30 HR, 103 RBI, .293 BA, .891 OPS). On the pitching side, Wainwright (11 wins, 3.71 ERA), Miles Mikolas (12 wins, 3.29 ERA) and mid-season acquisitions Jordan Montgomery (6 wins, 3.11 ERA) and José Quintana (3 wins, 2.01 ERA) led the rotation, and Giovanny Gallegos (14 saves, 3.05 ERA) and Ryan Helsley (19 saves, 1.25 ERA) anchored the bullpen.

St. Louis finished the season with a 93–69 record, ending as the second wild card team. However, they lost to the Philadelphia Phillies in two games of the 2022 National League Wild Card Series.

==== Missing the playoffs (2023) ====
The Cardinals posted a 71-91 record, finishing last in their division and missing the playoffs for the first time since 2018. It was also the end of an era as pitcher Adam Wainwright, who had been with the team since 2004, retired at the end of the season.

==== Middle of the pack (2024) ====
The Cardinals went 83–79 in the 2024 season, finishing six games short of a wild card berth and 10 games behind the first-place Brewers in the National League Central. Goldschmidt, in his final season with the Cardinals, led the team in home runs (22), and Alec Burleson drove in a team-leading 78 runs while being the only other player besides Goldschmidt with at least 20 home runs. Four other batters hit at least 15 home runs, and two others drove in at least 70 runs. New addition Sonny Gray became the staff ace with 13 wins and a 3.84 ERA, and Helsley saved a career-best 49 games while sporting a 2.04 ERA. Lance Lynn returned to St. Louis for his final Major League season, going 7–4 with a 3.84 ERA. After the season, Goldschmidt joined the New York Yankees, and Lynn retired. The team also brought in former Red Sox executive Chaim Bloom to replace John Mozeliak as president of baseball operations. Additionally, the emergence of catching prospect Iván Herrera that season led to the Cardinals converting erstwhile catcher Willson Contreras to a first baseman.
