= History of the Baltimore Orioles =

The Baltimore Orioles baseball franchise can trace its roots back to the original Milwaukee Brewers of the Western League (WL), beginning in 1894 when the league reorganized. The Brewers were still league members when the WL renamed itself the American League (AL) in 1900. At the end of the 1900 season, the AL removed itself from baseball's National Agreement of 1883, the formal understanding between the National League (NL) and the minor leagues, and declared itself a competing major league. During 1901, the first season the AL operated as a major league, the Brewers finished last among the league's eight teams.

In 1902, the team moved to St. Louis and became the "Browns", named after the original name of the 1880s club now known as the Cardinals. Although they usually fielded mediocre teams, they were very popular at the gate. In 1916, after years of prosperity at the gate, Robert Hedges sold the team to Phil Ball, who made a considerable effort to make the Browns competitive. However, Ball's tenure was marked by errors, including the firing of Branch Rickey, which eventually benefited the Cardinals, who shared Sportsman's Park with the Browns.

The 1944 season saw the Browns winning their only St. Louis-based American League pennant, becoming the last of the 16 teams that made up the major leagues from 1901 to 1960, to play in a World Series. In 1951, Bill Veeck purchased the Browns and introduced a series of promotions and wild antics. Veeck's efforts to drive the Cardinals out of St. Louis failed when Anheuser-Busch purchased the Cardinals. Veeck attempted to move the Browns to Milwaukee and then Baltimore, but both moves were initially blocked by other American League owners. Eventually, Veeck sold his stake to a group of Baltimore investors, and the team moved to Baltimore for the 1954 season, renaming themselves the Baltimore Orioles. The name has a rich history in Baltimore, having been used by Baltimore baseball teams since the late 19th century. The Orioles' early years in Baltimore were marked by a gradual climb to respectability, leading to their first World Series title in 1966. The Orioles enjoyed a period of sustained success from 1966 to 1983, winning three World Series titles and six American League pennants.

After the 1983 World Series win, the Orioles experienced a decline, culminating in the 1988 season where they lost the first 21 games. In 1989, the Orioles showed improvement with the "Why Not?" Orioles finishing second in the AL East. The opening of Oriole Park at Camden Yards in 1992 marked a new era, and the team returned to the playoffs in 1996 and 1997. However, the late 1990s and 2000s were characterized by losing seasons and rebuilding efforts. The Orioles saw a resurgence in the 2010s, making the playoffs in 2012, 2014, and 2016, with Buck Showalter as manager. The team struggled again towards the end of the decade, leading to a major rebuild. The 2020s have been marked by rebuilding efforts and developing young talent, aiming for future competitiveness.

== Milwaukee Brewers ==
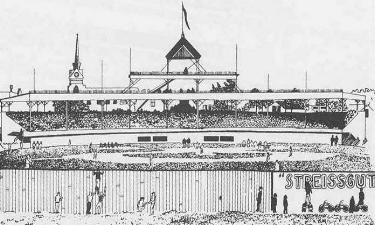
A drawing of Lloyd Street Grounds in 1901

The modern Orioles franchise can trace its roots back to the original Milwaukee Brewers of the minor-league Western League (WL), beginning in 1894 when the league reorganized. The Brewers were still league members when the WL renamed itself the American League (AL) in 1900.

At the end of the 1900 season, the AL removed itself from baseball's National Agreement of 1883, the formal understanding between the National League (NL) and the minor leagues. Two months later, the AL declared itself a competing major league. As the baseball "war" heated up, the AL began to challenge the NL senior circuit more directly. The AL already fielded teams in Boston, Chicago, and Philadelphia, solid NL cities. It had planned to move the Brewers to St. Louis for the 1901 season, but those plans fizzled. As a result of several franchise shifts, the Brewers were one of only two WL teams that did not either fold or move (the other being the Detroit Tigers).

During 1901, the first season that the AL operated as a major league, the Brewers finished last among the league's eight teams, with a record of 48–89 (.350). During its lone major-league season in Milwaukee, the team played at Lloyd Street Grounds, between 16th and 18th Streets in Milwaukee.

== St. Louis Browns ==
St. Louis Browns Logo, circa 1936–1951

In 1902, however, the team did move to St. Louis, where it became the "Browns", in reference to the original name of the legendary 1880s club that by 1902 was known as the Cardinals. In their first St. Louis season, the Browns finished second. Although they usually fielded terrible or mediocre teams (they had only four winning seasons from 1901 to 1922), they were very popular at the gate.

During this time, the Browns were best known for their role in the race for the 1910 American League batting title. Detroit's Ty Cobb took the last game of the season off, believing that his slight lead over Cleveland's Nap Lajoie was enough to win the title unless Lajoie had a near-perfect day at the plate. However, Cobb was one of the most despised players in baseball, and Browns catcher-manager Jack O'Connor ordered rookie third baseman Red Corriden to station himself in shallow left field. In each of his next five at bats, Lajoie bunted down the third-base line and made it to first easily. In his last at-bat, he reached base on an error – officially giving him a hitless at-bat. O'Connor and coach Harry Howell tried to bribe the official scorer, a woman, to change the call to a hit, even offering to buy her a new wardrobe. Cobb won the batting title by just a few thousandths of a point over Lajoie (though in 1978 sabermetrician Pete Palmer discovered that one game may have been counted twice in the statistics). The resulting outcry triggered an investigation by American League president Ban Johnson. At his insistence, Browns owner Robert Hedges fired O'Connor and Howell; both men were informally banned from baseball for life.

In 1916, after years of prosperity at the gate, Hedges sold the team to cold-storage magnate Phil Ball, who had owned the St. Louis Terriers of the defunct Federal League. Ball's tenure as owner saw the Browns' first period of prosperity; they were a contender for most of the early 1920s, even finishing second in 1922. He made a considerable effort to make the Browns competitive, reinvesting all profits back into the team.

Ball, however, committed several errors that dogged the franchise for years to come. His first major blunder was to fire Branch Rickey, the resident genius in the Browns' front office, in 1919 because of a conflict of egos, causing Rickey to jump to the crosstown Cardinals. In 1920 Sam Breadon, who had just purchased the Cardinals, convinced Ball to allow his team to share the Browns' home, Sportsman's Park. With the money from the sale of the Cardinals' Robison Field, Rickey began building an extensive farm system. This eventually produced a host of star players that brought the Cardinals far more drawing power than the Browns.

The 1922 Browns excited their owner by almost beating the Yankees to a pennant. The club was boasting the best players in franchise history, including George Sisler, and an outfield trio – Ken Williams, Baby Doll Jacobson, and Jack Tobin – who batted .300 or better in 1919–1923 and in 1925. In 1922, Williams became the first player in major league history to hit 30 home runs and steal 30 bases in a season, something that was not done again in the majors until 1956.

Ball confidently predicted that there would be a World Series in Sportsman's Park by 1926. In anticipation, he increased the capacity of his ballpark from 18,000 to 30,000. There was indeed a World Series in Sportsman's Park in 1926, but it was the Cardinals, not the Browns, who played in it, upsetting the Yankees. St. Louis had been considered a "Browns' town" until then; after 1926, the Cardinals dominated St. Louis baseball, while still technically tenants of the Browns. Meanwhile, the Browns rapidly fell into the cellar. They had only two winning records from 1927 to 1943, including a 43–111 mark in 1939 that is still the worst in franchise history.

Ball died in 1933. His estate ran the team for three years until Rickey helped broker a sale to investment banker Donald Lee Barnes, whose son-in-law, Bill DeWitt, was the team's general manager. To help finance the purchase, Barnes sold 20,000 shares of stock to the public at $5 a share, an unusual practice for a sports franchise.

=== War Era ===
==== 1944 ====
In 1944, during World War II, the Browns won their only St. Louis-based American League pennant, becoming the last of the 16 teams that made up the major leagues from 1901 to 1960 to play in a World Series. By comparison, each of the other seven American League teams had appeared in at least three World Series, and won it at least once. Some critics called it a fluke, as most major league stars voluntarily joined or were drafted into the military; however, many of the Browns' best players were classified 4-F (unfit for military service). They faced their local rivals, the more successful Cardinals, in the 1944 World Series, the last World Series played entirely in one stadium until 2020, and lost 4 games to 2. After the season, Barnes sold the Browns to businessman Richard Muckerman, who cared more about improving Sportsman's Park than getting better players.

==== 1945–1946 ====
In 1945, the Browns posted an 81–75 record and fell to third place, six games out, again with less than top-ranked talent. The 1945 season may be best remembered for the Browns' signing of utility outfielder Pete Gray, the only one-armed major league position player in history. They tumbled to seventh in 1946. They never finished with a winning record again while in St. Louis, partly because Muckerman was unwilling to improve the on-field product. Muckerman sold the team to DeWitt in 1949, but DeWitt was unable to reverse the slide.

=== Bill Veeck's Browns ===
In 1951, Bill Veeck, the colorful former owner of the Cleveland Indians, purchased the Browns. In St. Louis, he extended the promotions and wild antics that had made him famous and loved by many and loathed by many others. His most notorious stunt in St. Louis came on August 19, 1951, when he instructed Browns manager, Zack Taylor to send Eddie Gaedel, a 3-foot 7 inch, 65-pound midget, to bat as a pinch hitter. When Gaedel stepped to the plate he was wearing a Browns uniform with the number 1/8, and little slippers turned up at the end like elf's shoes. With no strike zone to speak of, Gaedel walked on four straight pitches. The stunt infuriated American League President Will Harridge, who voided Gaedel's contract the next day. In another Veeck stunt, the Browns handed out placards – reading take, swing, bunt, etc. – to fans and allowed them to make managerial decisions for a day. Taylor dutifully surveyed the fans' advice and relayed the sign accordingly.

Veeck also brought the legendary, and seemingly ageless, Satchel Paige back to major league baseball to pitch for the Browns. Veeck had previously signed the former Negro leagues great to a contract in Cleveland in 1948 at age 42, amid much criticism. At 45, Paige's re-appearance in a Browns' uniform did nothing to win Veeck friends among baseball's owners. Nonetheless, Paige ended the season with a respectable 3–4 record and a 4.79 earned run average.

Veeck believed that St. Louis was too small a market for two franchises, and planned to drive the Cardinals out of town. He signed many of the Cardinals' most locally loved ex-players and, as a result, brought many of their fans in to see the Browns. Veeck signed former Cardinals great Dizzy Dean to a broadcasting contract and tapped former Redbirds great Rogers Hornsby as manager. He also re-acquired former Browns fan favorite Vern Stephens and signed former Cardinals pitcher Harry Brecheen, both of whom had starred in the all-St. Louis World Series in 1944. He stripped Sportsman's Park of any Cardinals material and dressed it exclusively in Browns memorabilia. He even moved his family to an apartment under the stands.

Veeck's showmanship and colorful promotions made the fan experience at a Browns game more fun and unpredictable than that at a Cardinals game. At the same time, the Cardinals were finally feeling the effects of Rickey's departure for the Brooklyn Dodgers in 1942. In early 1953, Cardinals owner Fred Saigh was indicted for tax evasion, and ultimately pleaded no contest to lesser charges. Facing almost certain banishment from baseball, Saigh was forced to put the Cardinals up for sale. For a time, no credible offers surfaced from St. Louis interests, and it looked as if Veeck's all-out assault on the Cardinals might indeed force them out of town.

However, Saigh turned down higher offers from out-of-town buyers in favor of a bid from the St. Louis-based Anheuser-Busch brewery, which stepped in with the intent of keeping the Cardinals in St. Louis. Veeck quickly realized that the Cardinals now had more resources than he could possibly hope to match. Reluctantly, he decided to cede St. Louis to the Cardinals and move the Browns elsewhere. The Browns had been candidates for relocation earlier; in 1941, they had come close to moving to Los Angeles, nearly two decades before Major League Baseball arrived in California. The American League even drew up a schedule including Los Angeles and had a meeting scheduled to vote on the relocation of the Browns. However, on December 7, the day the vote was scheduled, the Japanese bombed Pearl Harbor.

Soon after Anheuser-Busch closed on its purchase of the Cardinals, Veeck sold Sportsman's Park to the Cardinals–thus ending a situation where the more popular team in a two-team city was the tenant of the less-popular team. It is very likely Veeck would have had to sell it in any event, as the 44-year-old park had fallen into disrepair. The city was threatening to have it condemned, and Veeck could not afford to make the necessary improvements to bring it up to code even with the rent from the Cardinals.

Veeck attempted to move the Browns back to Milwaukee (where he had owned the Brewers of the American Association in the 1940s) for the 1953 season. However, the other American League owners blocked the move, seemingly for reasons that were more personal than business related.

Veeck then tried to move the Browns to Baltimore. He got in touch with Mayor Thomas D'Alesandro Jr. and attorney Clarence Miles, who were leading an effort to bring the major leagues back to Baltimore after a half-century hiatus. However, he was rebuffed by the owners, still seething at the publicity stunts he pulled at the Browns home games.

After the season, Veeck cut a deal with Miles which would see the Browns move to Baltimore. Under the plan, Veeck would sell half of his 80 percent stake in the Browns to Miles and several other Baltimore investors, with Veeck remaining as principal owner. Despite being assured by American League president Will Harridge that there would be no problem getting approval, only four owners voted aye – two short of passage. Reportedly, this was due to Yankees co-owner Del Webb drumming up support to move the Browns to Los Angeles.

Miles and D'Alesandro realized that the owners were simply looking for a way to push Veeck out. Over the next 48 hours, Miles lined up enough support from his group of investors to buy out Veeck's stake entirely for $2.5 million. The plan called for Baltimore brewer Jerold Hoffberger to emerge as the largest single shareholder, though Miles became team president. With his only leverage, ownership of Sportsman's Park, gone and facing threats of having his franchise liquidated, Veeck had little choice but to agree. Miles' first act was to submit a renewed request to move to Baltimore for the 1954 season. With Veeck "out of the way", this request was swiftly approved.

=== Legacy ===
Unlike other clubs that relocated in the 1950s, retaining their nickname and a sense of continuity with their past (such as the Brooklyn-Los Angeles Dodgers), the Browns were renamed upon their transfer, implicitly severing themselves from their history. In December 1954, the team further distanced itself from its Browns past by making a 17-player trade with the New York Yankees that included most former Browns of note still on the roster. Though the deal did little to improve the short-term competitiveness of the club, it did help establish a fresh identity for the franchise. To this day, it mentions almost nothing about its past in St. Louis.

There are still societies to keep the memory of the team alive in St. Louis; the club was based in the city for 52 years. In 2006, the O's played their 53rd season in Baltimore, longer than they had played in St. Louis.

== Baltimore Orioles ==
Soon after taking over, the Miles-Hoffberger group renamed their new team the Baltimore Orioles. The name has a rich history in Baltimore, having been used by Baltimore baseball teams since the late 19th century.

=== History of the Orioles name ===
In the 1890s, in the National League of Professional Base Ball Clubs ("National League"), established in 1876, Baltimore Orioles squad included "Wee" Willie Keeler, Wilbert Robinson, Hughie Jennings and John McGraw. They won three straight unprecedented NL pennants – 1894/1895/1896, and participated in all four of the then "Temple Cup" championship series, winning the last two of them.

That Orioles team had started a decade and a half earlier as a charter member of the old American Association in 1882, a competing rival to the then 7 year older National League. Despite its on-field success in either first or second place standings, it was sabotaged as one of the four teams that was contracted out of existence by the National League after the 1899 season which reduced itself from 12 franchises to 8 teams, a number which endured for over half a century. Its best players (and its manager, Ned Hanlon) regrouped with the Brooklyn Trolley Dodgers, turning that later famous team into a contender.

In 1900 and 1901, Baltimore and player/manager McGraw were awarded a charter franchise of the original 8 in the newly reorganized American League of Professional Baseball Clubs ("American League"), (out of the old minor league level Western League) which had claimed major league status under feisty president Ban Johnson, but again the team and city of Baltimore was sacrificed in favor of a New York City franchise – the "New York Highlanders", or occasionally known as the "New York Americans", as the team was replaced in 1903 by the nation's biggest city after only playing two seasons, 1901 and 1902, as one of the terms negotiated of the "peace pact" to end the "baseball wars" between the elder Nationals of 1876 and the fledging upstart American League of 1901, giving the newcomers a representative franchise in the one American city that was the biggest and most important. Another term of the truce was also with inauguration of a new championship game tournament series to be known as the World Series, also begun in 1903.

After some early struggles, that fledging New York Highlanders team eventually became renamed a decade later in 1913 and by the 1920s with the help of a young Baltimorean – George Herman "Babe" Ruth and eventually became baseball's most successful franchise – the New York Yankees.

The name was then revived for a a high-level minor league team from 1903 to 1953. These Orioles were a mainstay of the International League (with Canadian and Cuban teams competing against Americans), competing at what eventually became the Triple-A ("AAA") level, one rung below the majors. Baltimore's own Babe Ruth pitched briefly for owner/manager Jack Dunn's Orioles for part of one season after signing the 19 year old wild rough youth out of St. Mary's Industrial School on Wilkens and Caton Avenues, just on the southwest edge of the city before being forced to further sell him to the AL Boston Red Sox in 1914 because of the new third major league competition by the Baltimore Terrapins of the upstart Federal League for two seasons.

The IL Orioles were among the best baseball teams in the minors, offering frequent competition to passing AL and NL teams in exhibitions. The "Birds" won nine league championships, first in 1908 followed by a lengthy dominating run during the "Roaring 20's" from 1919 to 1925, and then finally dramatically during World War II in 1944, after they had lost their home field Oriole Park (built 1915) on Greenmount Avenue in a disastrous mid-season fire. Later relocating to 33rd Street Boulevard to Municipal Stadium (aka Baltimore or Venable or later as Babe Ruth Stadium), the 1922-built football stadium, for the rest of the 1944 season (plus the following decade to 1954 as well). Because of the stadium's large capacity, the Junior World Series easily outdrew that year's major league World Series which, coincidentally, included the same team of the St. Louis Browns of the AL (versus cross-town rivals St. Louis Cardinals from the NL) that moved to Baltimore 10 years later and take up occupancy in the rebuilt 1949–1954 version of what became Memorial Stadium in former Venable Park on 33rd Street.

For the 2014 season, the Orioles wore a patch on their right sleeve to commemorate the 60th anniversary of the franchise's move to Baltimore.

=== First years in Baltimore (1954–1965) ===
The new AL Orioles took about six years to become competitive even after jettisoning most of the holdovers from St. Louis. Under the guidance of Paul Richards, who served as both field manager and general manager from 1955 to 1958 (the first man since John McGraw to hold both positions simultaneously), the Orioles began a slow climb to respectability. While they posted a .500 record only once in their first five years (76–76 in 1957), they were a success at the gate. In their first season, for instance, they drew more than 1.06 million fans – more than five times what they had ever drawn in their tenures in Milwaukee and St. Louis. This came amid slight turnover in the ownership group. Miles served as team president for two years, then stepped down in favor of developer James Keelty. In turn, Keelty gave way in 1960 to financier Joe Iglehart.

By the early 1960s, stars such as Brooks Robinson, John "Boog" Powell, and Dave McNally were being developed by a strong farm system. The Orioles first made themselves heard in 1960, when they finished 89–65, good enough for second in the American League. While they were still eight games behind the Yankees, it was the first time they had been a factor in a pennant race that late in the season since 1944. It was also the first season of a 26-year stretch where the team had only two losing seasons. Shortstop Ron Hansen was named AL Rookie of the Year, and first-year pitcher Chuck Estrada tied for the league lead in wins with 18, finishing second to Hansen in the Rookie of the Year balloting.

After the 1965 season, Hoffberger acquired controlling interest in the Orioles from Iglehart and installed himself as president. He had been serving as a silent partner over the past decade despite being the largest shareholder. Frank Cashen, advertising chief of Hoffberger's brewery, became executive vice-president.

On December 9, 1965, not long after Hoffberger took over, he engineered a deal that sent pitcher Milt Pappas and several others to the Cincinnati Reds in exchange for slugging outfielder Frank Robinson. In 1966, Robinson won the Triple Crown (leading the American League in batting average, home runs, and runs batted in) and received the American League Most Valuable Player Award, becoming the first player to win the MVP Award in each league (he had been named NL MVP in 1961, leading the Reds to the pennant). The Orioles won their first-ever American League championship in 1966 and, in a major upset, swept the World Series by out-dueling the Los Angeles Dodgers aces Sandy Koufax and Don Drysdale. The Orioles thus became the last of the eight teams that made up the American League from 1903 to 1960 to win a World Series. Pappas, meanwhile, went 30–29 in a little over two years with the Reds before being traded. Although he later had back-to-back 17-win seasons for the Chicago Cubs in 1971 and 1972, including a no-hitter in the latter season, this did not help the Reds, who ended up losing the 1970 World Series to Robinson and the Orioles. This trade has become renowned as one of the most lopsided in baseball history, including a mention by Susan Sarandon in her opening soliloquy in the 1988 film Bull Durham: "Bad trades are a part of baseball. I mean, who can forget Frank Robinson for Milt Pappas?"

=== Glory years (1966–1983) ===
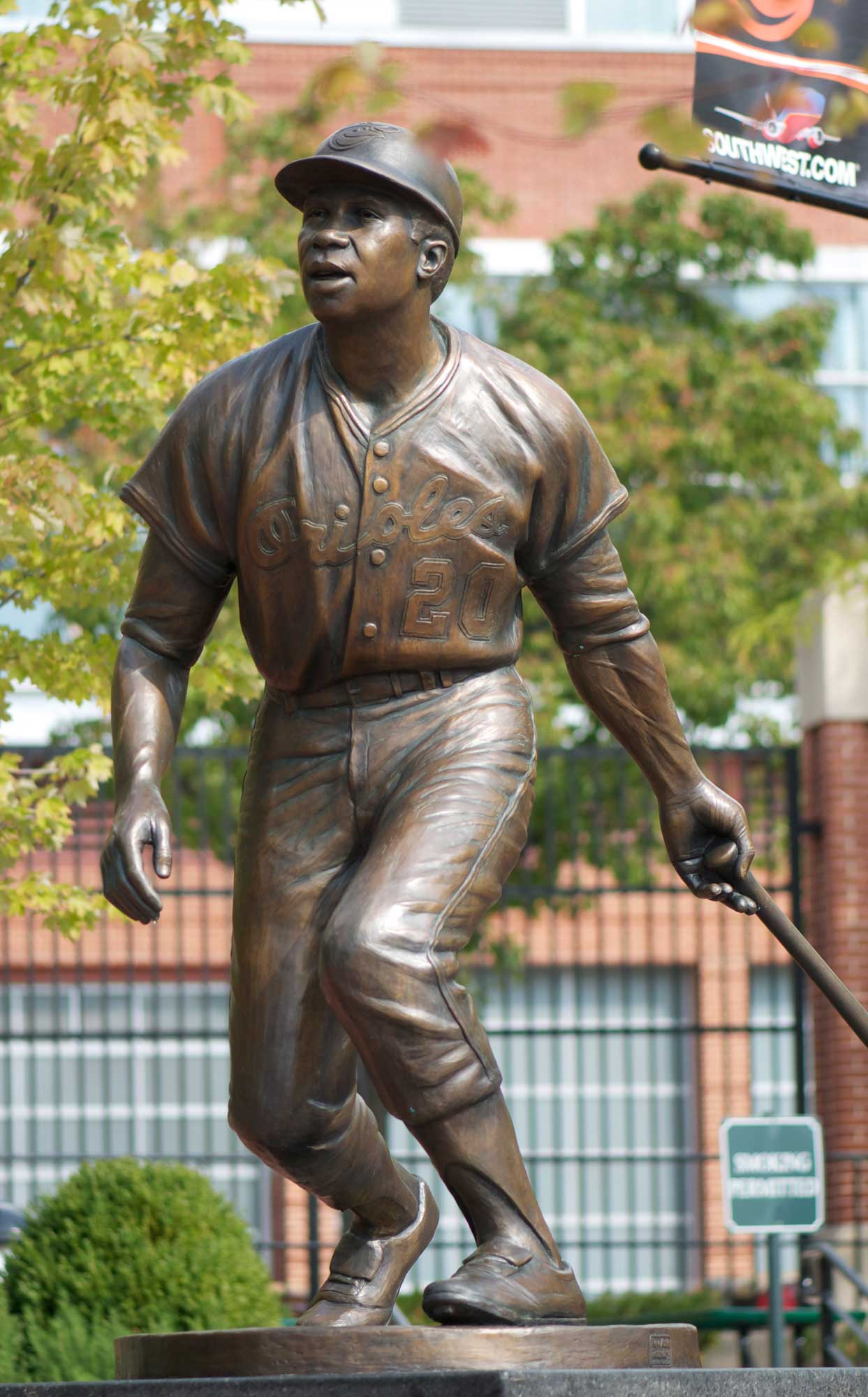
Frank Robinson statue by Antonio Tobias Mendez

The Orioles farm system had begun to produce a number of high-quality players and coaches who formed the core of winning teams; from 1966 to 1983, the Orioles won three World Series titles (1966, 1970, and 1983), six American League pennants (1966, 1969, 1970, 1971, 1979, and 1983), and five of the first six American League East titles. They played baseball the "Oriole Way", an organizational ethic best described by longtime farm hand and coach Cal Ripken, Sr.'s phrase "perfect practice makes perfect!" The Oriole Way was a belief that hard work, professionalism, and a strong understanding of fundamentals were the keys to success at the major league level. It was based on the belief that if every coach, at every level, taught the game the same way, the organization could produce "replacement parts" that could be substituted seamlessly into the big league club with little or no adjustment. This led to a run of success from 1966 to 1983 which saw the Orioles become the envy of the league, and the winningest team in baseball.

During this stretch, three different Orioles were named Most Valuable Player (Frank Robinson in 1966, Boog Powell in 1970, and Cal Ripken Jr. in 1983), four Oriole pitchers combined for six Cy Young Awards (Mike Cuellar in 1969, Jim Palmer in 1973, 1975, and 1976, Mike Flanagan in 1979, and Steve Stone in 1980), and three players were named Rookie of the Year (Al Bumbry in 1973, Eddie Murray in 1977, and Cal Ripken Jr. in 1982).

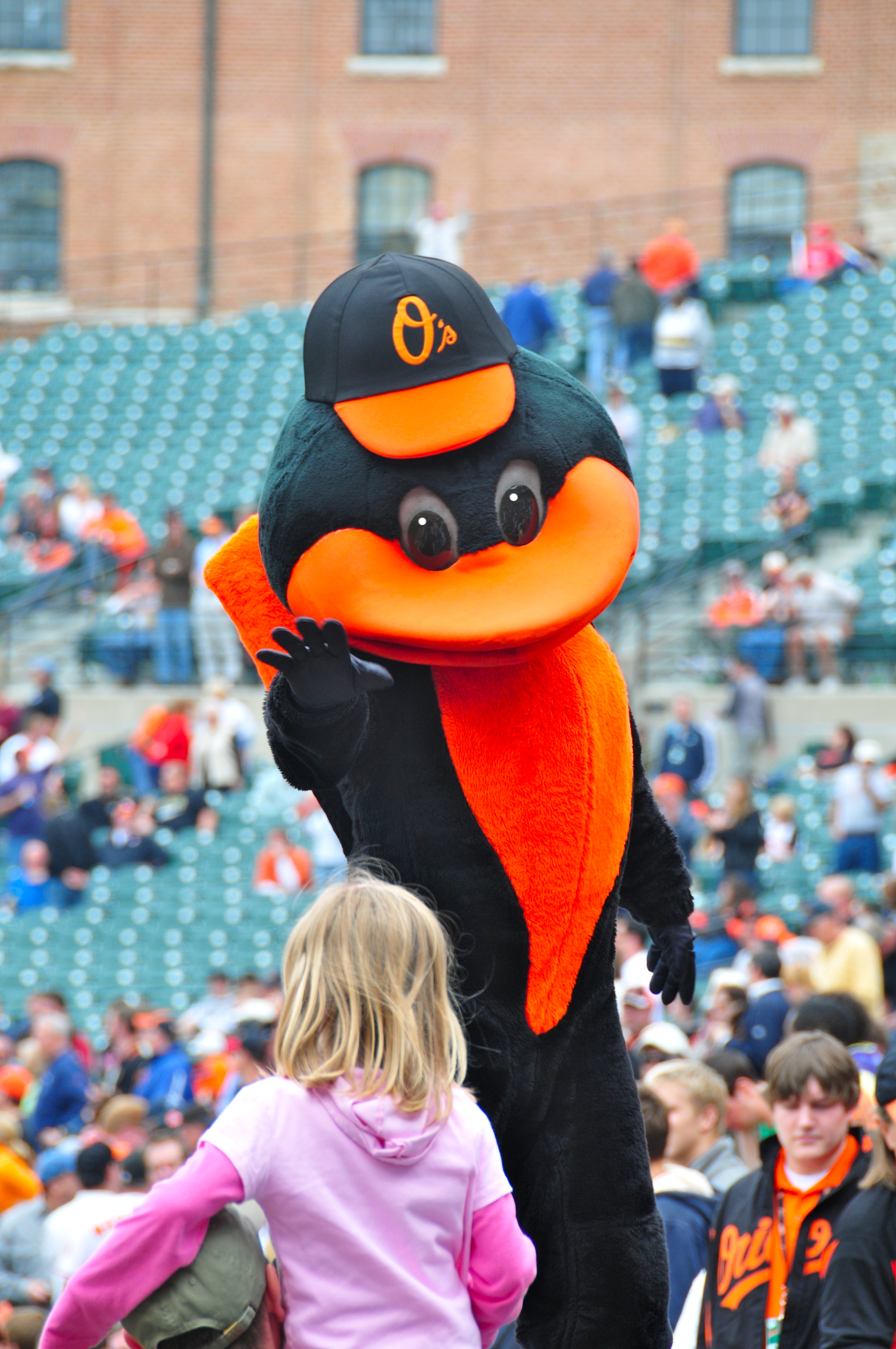
The "Oriole Bird", which has been the official mascot figure since April 6, 1979

It was also during this time that the Orioles severed their last remaining financial link to their era in St. Louis. In 1979, Hoffberger sold the Orioles to his longtime friend, Washington attorney Edward Bennett Williams. As part of the deal, Williams bought the publicly traded shares Donald Barnes had issued in 1936 while the team was still in St. Louis, making the franchise privately held once again and severing one of the few remaining links with the Orioles' past in St. Louis.

During this rise to prominence, "Weaver Ball" came into vogue. Named for fiery manager Earl Weaver, it was defined by the Oriole trifecta of "pitching, defense, and the three-run home run." When an Oriole general manager was told by a reporter that Earl Weaver, as the skipper of a very talented team, was a "push-button manager", he replied, "Earl built the machine and installed all the buttons!"

As Frank and Brooks Robinson grew older, newer stars emerged, including multiple Cy Young Award winner Jim Palmer and switch-hitting first baseman Eddie Murray. With the decline and eventual departure of two other professional sports teams in the area, the National Football League's Baltimore Colts and baseball's Washington Senators, the Orioles' excellence paid off at the gate, as the team cultivated a large and rabid fan base at old Memorial Stadium.

=== Collapse and redemption (1984–1991) ===
After winning the World Series in 1983, the Orioles organization began to decline. In 1986, a rash of injuries resulted in the team suffering its first losing season since 1967. The 1988 season started unceremoniously when the Orioles lost their first 21 contests, finally winning in the team's next-to-last game of April. Manager Cal Ripken, Sr. was fired six games into the season, replaced by former Oriole great Frank Robinson. However, this was not enough to stop the bleeding, and the Orioles ended the year at 54–107, the worst record for the franchise since 1939.

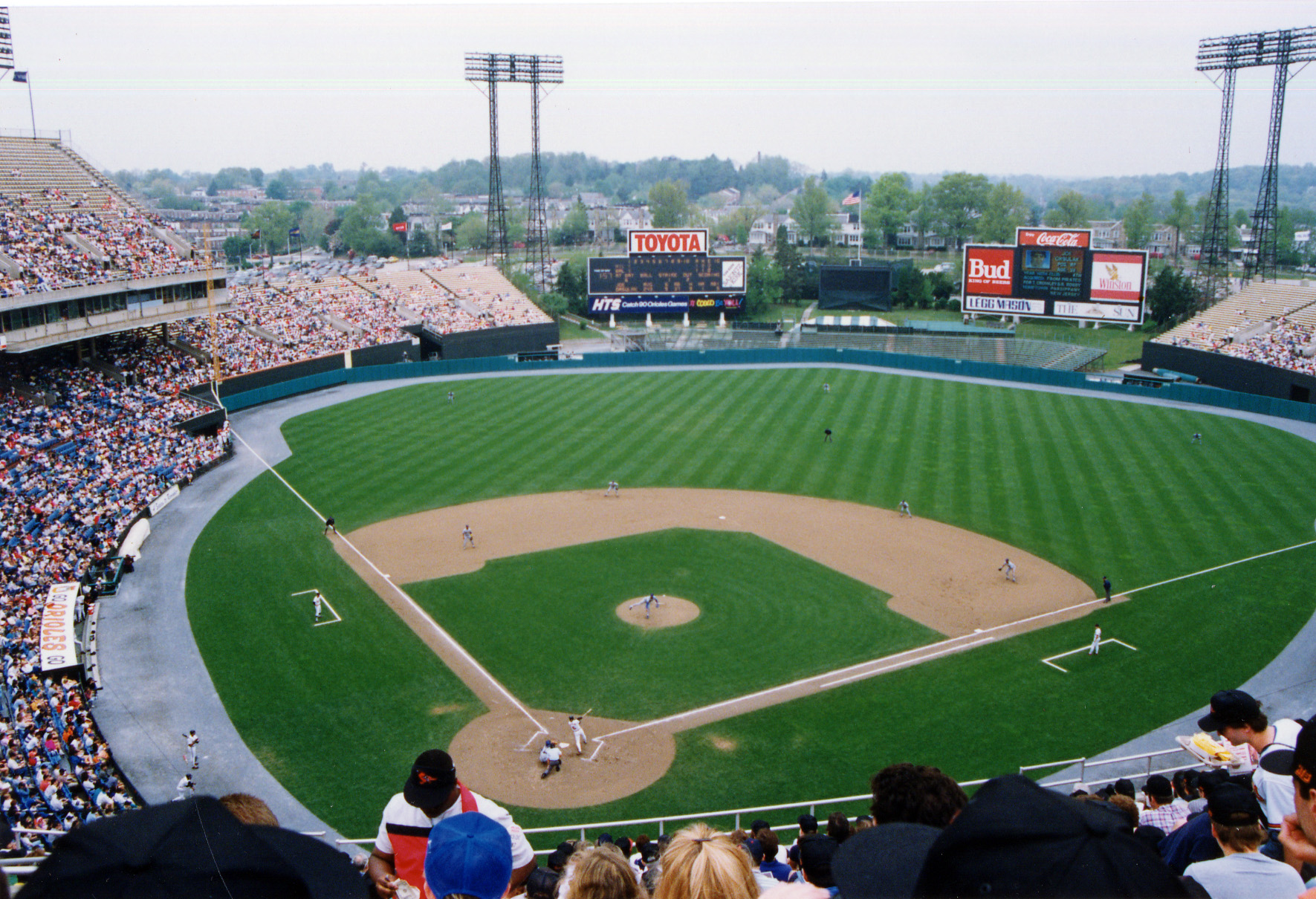
The Orioles hosting one of the final games at Memorial Stadium in 1991

The next year, the Orioles sported a new look, replacing the cartoonish bird with a more realistic one. The 1989 squad, led by surprise ace Jeff Ballard, rebounded to finish in second place behind the Toronto Blue Jays with an 87–75 record, staying in contention until the last week of the season and earning the nickname of the "Why Not?" Orioles. Frank Robinson earned the 1989 American League Manager of the Year Award for his efforts in leading the team out of the abyss. Two years later, Cal Ripken Jr. won the American League Most Valuable Player award in the team's final season at Memorial Stadium. He was also named Most Valuable Player of the 1991 All-Star Game, played in Toronto's SkyDome.

=== Oriole Park at Camden Yards and Ripken's record (1992–1995) ===
Opening to much fanfare in 1992, Oriole Park at Camden Yards was an instant success, inspiring other retro-style major league ballparks in the next decades. The stadium was the site of the 1993 All-Star Game. The Orioles returned to contention in the first two seasons at Camden Yards, only to finish in third place both times.

In 1993, with owner Eli Jacobs forced to divest himself of the franchise, Baltimore-based attorney Peter Angelos, along with the ownership syndicate he headed, was awarded the Orioles in bankruptcy court in New York City, returning the team to local ownership for the first time since 1979. Angelos's partners included author Tom Clancy and comic book distributor Steve Geppi. The Orioles, who spent all of 1994 chasing the New York Yankees, occupied second place in the new five-team AL East when the players strike, which began on August 11, forced the eventual cancellation of the season.

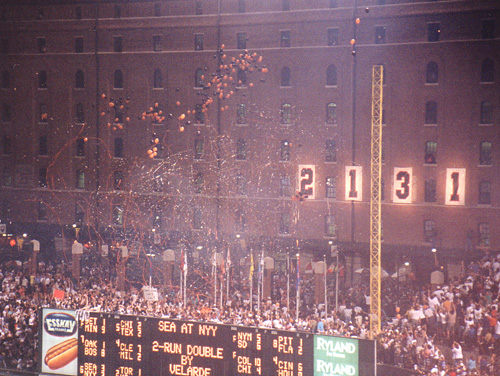
The numbers on the Orioles' warehouse changed from 2130 to 2131 to celebrate Cal Ripken Jr. passing Lou Gehrig's consecutive games played streak.

The labor impasse continued into the spring of 1995. Almost all the major league clubs held spring training using replacement players, with the intention of beginning the season with them. The Orioles, whose owner was a labor union lawyer, were the lone dissenters against creating an ersatz team, choosing instead to sit out spring training and possibly the entire season. Had they fielded a substitute team, Cal Ripken Jr.'s consecutive games streak would have been jeopardized. The replacements questions became moot when the strike was finally settled. The Ripken countdown resumed once the season began. Ripken finally broke Lou Gehrig's consecutive games streak of 2,130 games in a nationally televised game against the California Angels on September 6. This was later voted the all-time baseball moment of the 20th century by fans from around the country in 1999. Ripken finished his streak with 2,632 straight games, finally sitting on September 20, 1998, the Orioles final home game of the season against the Yankees at Camden Yards.

=== Return to the playoffs (1996–1997) ===
In 1996, team owner Peter Angelos hired Pat Gillick away from the Toronto Blue Jays to be the Orioles' general manager. Gillick brought in several players, including catcher B. J. Surhoff, relief pitcher Randy Myers, and second baseman Roberto Alomar. Under Gillick and manager Davey Johnson, the Orioles returned to postseason play by winning the American League's wild card spot in the 1996 season. The team set a major league record for home runs in a single season, with 257, and upset the Cleveland Indians in the Division Series before falling to the Yankees in a controversial American League Championship Series (a fan, Jeffrey Maier, interfered with a fly ball hit by Derek Jeter in Game 1; the play was ruled a home run and the Yankees eventually won the game). The Orioles followed up by winning the AL East Division title in 1997, going "wire-to-wire" (being in first place from the first day of the season to the last). After eliminating the Seattle Mariners in four games in the opening round, the team lost again in the 1997 American League Championship Series, this time to the underdog Indians, in which each Oriole loss was by one run. After the Orioles failed to advance to the World Series in either playoff, Johnson resigned as manager following a dispute with Angelos, with pitching coach Ray Miller taking his place.

=== Downturn (1998–2004) ===
With Miller at the helm, the Orioles found themselves not only out of the playoffs, but also with a losing season. When Gillick's contract expired in 1998, it was not renewed, and Angelos brought in Frank Wren to take over as general manager. The Orioles added volatile slugger Albert Belle, but the team's woes continued in the 1999 season, with stars like Rafael Palmeiro, Roberto Alomar (who joined his brother Sandy Jr. in Cleveland), and Eric Davis leaving via free agency. After a second straight losing season, Angelos fired both Miller and Wren. He named Syd Thrift as general manager and brought in former Cleveland manager Mike Hargrove to lead the team on the field. In 1998, the Orioles updated the bird in their logo, and then once again the next season in 1999.

The first decade of the 21st century saw the Orioles struggle due to the combination of lackluster play on the team's part, a string of ineffective management, and the ascent of the Yankees and Red Sox to the top of the game – each rival having a clear advantage in financial flexibility due to their larger media market sizes. Further complicating the situation for the Orioles was the relocation of the National League's Montreal Expos franchise to nearby Washington, D.C. in 2004. Orioles owner Peter Angelos demanded compensation from Major League Baseball, as the new Washington Nationals threatened to carve into the Orioles fan base and television dollars. However, there was some hope that having competition in the larger Baltimore-Washington metro market would spur the Orioles to field a better product to compete for fans with the Nationals.

Beginning with the 2003 season, big changes began to sweep through the organization to try to snap the losing ways. General manager Thrift was fired as general manager, and to replace him, the Orioles hired Jim Beattie as executive vice president and Mike Flanagan as vice president of baseball operations. After another losing season, manager Hargrove was not retained and Yankees coach Lee Mazzilli was brought in as the new field manager. The team signed powerful hitters in shortstop Miguel Tejada, catcher Javy López, and former Oriole first baseman Rafael Palmeiro. The following season, the Orioles traded for outfielder Sammy Sosa.

=== 2005 season ===
The 2005 season was one of the more controversial in the Orioles' history. The Orioles began the season with a tremendous start, holding onto first place in the AL East division for 62 straight days. However, turmoil on and off the field began to take its toll as the team started struggling around the All-Star break, dropping them close to the surging Yankees and Red Sox. Injuries to Luis Matos, Javy López, Brian Roberts, Sammy Sosa, and Larry Bigbie came within weeks of each other. The team was increasingly dissatisfied with the front office's and manager Mazzilli's "band-aid" moves to help the team through this period of struggle. Various minor league players such as A League Frederick outfielder Jeff Fiorentino were brought up in place of more experienced players such as David Newhan, who had batted .311 the previous season.

On July 15, Rafael Palmeiro collected his 3,000th hit in Seattle; but 15 days later he was suspended for a violation of MLB's drug policy, after testing positive for the anabolic steroid stanozolol. The Orioles continued tumbling, falling out of first place and further down the AL East standings. This downfall cost Mazzilli his managerial job in early August, allowing bench coach and 2003 managerial candidate Sam Perlozzo to take over as interim manager and lead the team to a 23–32 finish. The Orioles called up Dave Cash from the Ottawa Lynx to serve as the team's first base coach.

Sosa, who was the club's biggest offseason acquisition, posted his worst performance in a decade, with 14 home runs and a .221 batting average. The Orioles did not attempt to re-sign him, considering his exorbitant salary, his miserable performance, and his stormy relationship with batting coach Terry Crowley and teammates including Miguel Tejada. The Orioles also allowed Palmeiro to file for free agency and publicly stated they would not re-sign him. On August 25, pitcher Sidney Ponson was arrested for DUI and on September 1 the Orioles moved to void his contract (on a morals clause) and release him. The Major League Baseball Players Association filed a grievance on Ponson's behalf and the case was sent to arbitration. The case was finally resolved in late 2008 with Ponson winning at the arbitration hearings.

=== 2005–06 offseason ===
==== Front office changes ====
Following the disappointing 2005 season, it was clear major changes needed to be made within the Orioles. In the front office, Executive VP Beattie was not re-signed, allowing Flanagan to become the sole general manager. Shortly after, Jim Duquette was hired as vice president of baseball operations, which was Flanagan's previous position. Duquette made it clear at his signing that he reported to Flanagan, so the "two-headed GM" will not exist anymore. The Orioles also fired assistant general manager Ed Kenney and asked for the resignation of Dave Ritterpusch, the director of baseball information systems.

==== Coaching staff changes ====
There were also drastic changes in the Orioles coaching staff. Perlozzo was named the new manager, and unlike Mazzilli, was given full freedom to name his coaching staff. Perlozzo led off strong by convincing Atlanta pitching coach Leo Mazzone, who had revolutionized the careers of many pitchers in Atlanta, to become the pitching coach for the Orioles. He retained Crowley as hitting coach and Cash as first base coach. Former base coach and 1983 World Series World Series MVP Award Rick Dempsey replaced the late Elrod Hendricks as the bullpen coach, with Tom Trebelhorn resuming third base coach. Perlozzo rounded out his staff with former Cubs and Phillies manager Lee Elia as the bench coach.

==== Roster changes ====
The roster changes of 2005 were prefaced with Peter Angelos' comments: "We are coming back strong next year. I know you have heard that tune before, but this time it will literally come true." The Orioles allowed Palmeiro, Sosa, and Surhoff to become free agents. They also set their wishlist: an everyday first baseman, an experienced starter, a closer, a defensive catcher, outfield help, more defense, and more speed. However, their off-season moves showed no differences from past years. The Orioles were not able to re-sign closer B. J. Ryan, who signed with the Toronto Blue Jays. They were also locked out in bids to sign first baseman Paul Konerko, outfielder Johnny Damon, and starter Paul Byrd. The Orioles were rumoured to have a deal with outfielder Jeromy Burnitz, but his agent balked, supposedly at language regarding the physical, which was deemed by legal experts to be rather standard, and Burnitz signed with the Pittsburgh Pirates. The Orioles chose not to enter the bidding for players like A. J. Burnett and Kevin Millwood, whose asking prices were far beyond what the Orioles were willing to pay. The only target the Orioles managed to sign was catcher Ramón Hernández.

Locked out of pursuits to sign top-tier players, the Orioles decided to make several moves to allow minor league prospects more time to develop. This led to bringing in players like Jeff Conine and Kevin Millar, both of whom were known for their positive presence in the clubhouse. The Orioles also made several trades to bring in needed players. They first traded disgruntled reliever Steve Kline for LaTroy Hawkins, then traded for outfielder Corey Patterson, who brought speed and defense to the outfield, and traded former closer Jorge Julio and John Maine for experienced starter Kris Benson. The Orioles also addressed future free agents by extending the contract of outfielder Jay Gibbons and third baseman Melvin Mora, and signed a contract extension with second baseman Brian Roberts. The team's opening day roster featured top prospect Nick Markakis, a potential A.L. "Rookie of the Year", the best young position player the Orioles' farm system has produced since Roberts. Markakis represented the revival of the Orioles' once proud farm system, which features four players listed in Baseball America's 2006 list of the top 100 prospects in minor league baseball.

==== Miguel Tejada ====
The Orioles' lack of movement over the course of the off-season frustrated many, including Miguel Tejada. This led to him stating, controversially, that he "wanted to play for a winner", and "perhaps a change of scenery is needed." The Oriole front office began to talk to many teams interested in Tejada as a trade. It was rumored that the Boston Red Sox offered All-Star outfielder Manny Ramírez for Tejada, though no Orioles officials confirmed this. There were also talks of Mark Prior being offered for Tejada. After several weeks, teammate Melvin Mora facilitated a conference call between the Orioles and Tejada where Tejada backed down and said his comments were intended to provoke the Orioles to make more moves in free agency.

The Orioles finished the up and down 2006 season with a record of 70–92, 27 games behind the Yankees, who won the AL East Division.

=== Rebuilding years and arrival of Buck Showalter (2007–2011) ===
A new President of Baseball of Operations named Andy MacPhail was brought in about halfway through the 2007 season. MacPhail had had success as general manager of the Minnesota Twins in the late 1980s and early 1990s, and had been the chief executive officer of the Chicago Cubs from 1994 to 2006. He spent the remainder of the 2007 season assessing the talent level of the Orioles, and determined that significant steps needed to be made if the Orioles were ever to be a contender again in the American League East. He completed two blockbuster trades during the next off-season, each sending a premium player away in return for five prospects or (or younger less expensive players). Tejada, who had hit .296 with 18 home runs and 81 runs batted in during 2007, went to the Houston Astros in exchange for outfielder Luke Scott, pitchers Matt Albers, Troy Patton, and Dennis Sarfate, and third baseman Mike Costanzo. The newly designated ace of the Orioles rotation, Érik Bédard, who went 13–5 with a 3.16 earned run average and 221 strikeouts in 2007, was sent to the Seattle Mariners in exchange for top outfield prospect Adam Jones, left-handed pitcher George Sherrill, and three minor league pitchers – Chris Tillman, Kam Mickolio, and Tony Butler. The Bedard trade in particular became one of the most lop-sided and successful trades in the history of the franchise.

While MacPhail found success in most of his trades made for the Orioles over the long-term, the veteran acquisitions that he made often did not pan out, and as a result, the team did not finish higher than 4th place in the AL East, or with more than 69 wins, while MacPhail was in charge. Some of his free agent signings had positive contributions (such as reliever Koji Uehara), most gave only mediocre returns. In particular, the Orioles never managed to cobble together a successful pitching staff during this time. Their most consistent starting pitcher from 2008 to 2011 was the late bloomer Jeremy Guthrie who was the Opening Day starter in 3 of the 4 seasons and had a cumulative 4.12 earned run average during this stretch.

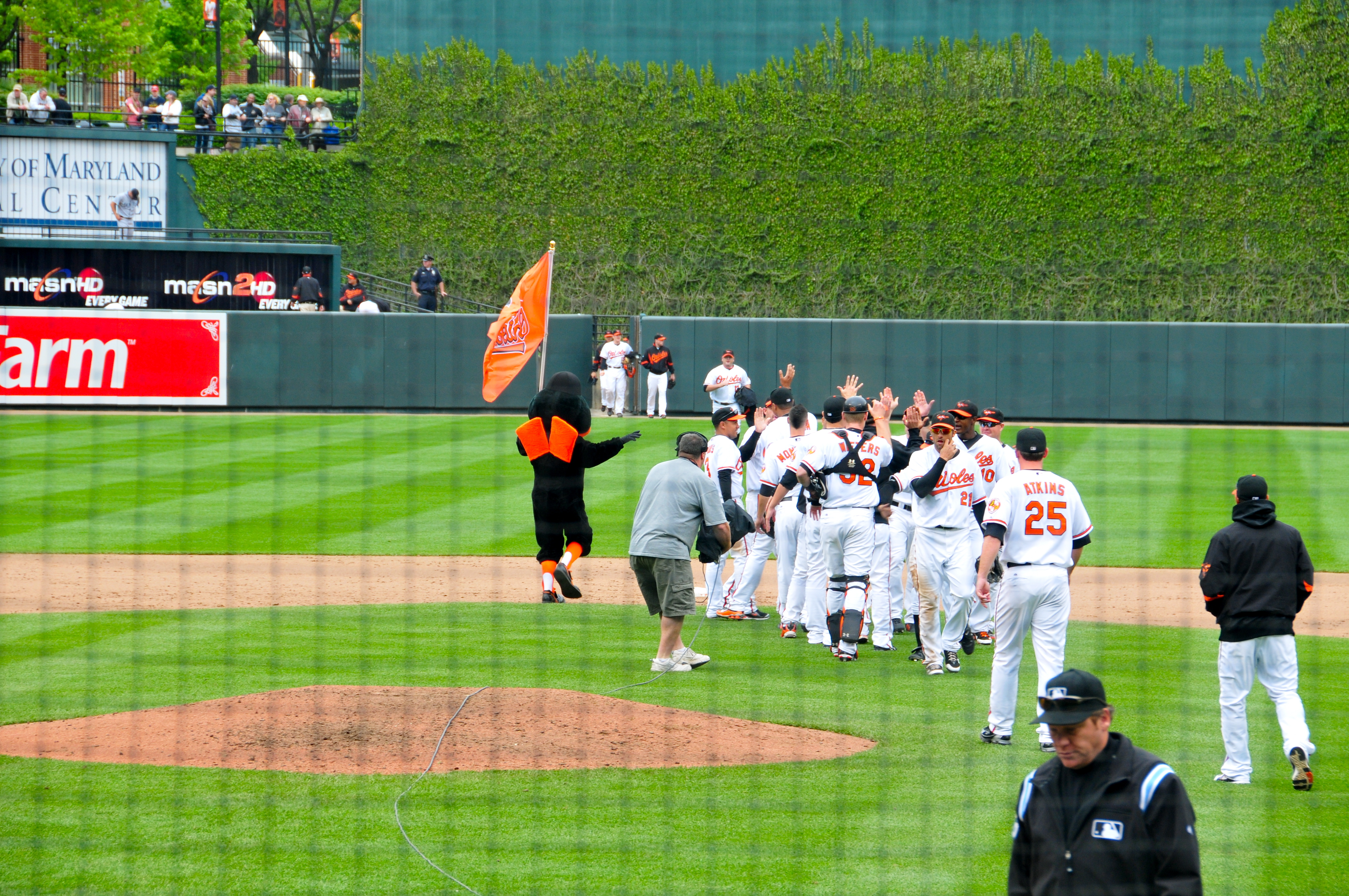
The Orioles celebrate a 6–5 victory over the Mariners at Camden Yards on May 13, 2010.

Following Davey Johnson's dismissal after the 1997 playoff season, Orioles ownership struggled to find a manager that they liked, and this time period was no exception. Dave Trembley was brought on as an interim manager in June 2007, and had the interim tag removed later that year. Trembley was at the helm again in 2008 and 2009 but was not able to lead the team out of the cellar in the AL East. After starting the 2010 season a dismal 15–39, Trembley was fired and third base coach Juan Samuel was named the interim manager. The Orioles were seeking a more permanent solution at manager as the 2010 season continued to unfold, and two-time AL Manager of the Year Buck Showalter was eventually hired in July 2010. The Orioles went 34–23 after he took over, foreshadowing that a brighter future might be on the horizon, and giving Orioles fans renewed hope and optimism for the team's future.

The Orioles made some aggressive moves to improve the team in 2011 in the hopes of securing their first playoff berth since 1997. MacPhail completed trades to bring in established veterans like Mark Reynolds and J. J. Hardy from the Diamondbacks and Twins, respectively. Veteran free agents Derrek Lee and Vladimir Guerrero were also brought in to help improve the offense. At the 2011 trade deadline, fan favorite Koji Uehara was sent to the Texas Rangers in exchange for Chris Davis and Tommy Hunter, a move that did not pay immediate dividends, but was crucial to the team's later success. While these moves had varying impacts, the Orioles scored 95 more runs in 2011 than they had the previous year. The team still finished last in the AL East due to the utter failures of the team's pitching staff. Brian Matusz compiled one of the highest single-season earned run averages in major league history (10.69 over 12 starts) and every pitcher who started a game for the Orioles except for Jeremy Guthrie ended the season with an earned run average of 4.50 or higher. The Orioles finished last out of 30 major league teams that year with a 4.89 team earned run average. MacPhail's contract was not renewed in October 2011 and a search for a new general manager began. After a public interview process where several candidates declined to take the position, former general manager Dan Duquette was brought in to serve as the executive vice-president of baseball operations.

=== "Buckle Up, We won't stop" (2012–2014) ===
Duquette wasted no time in overhauling the Orioles roster, especially the pitching staff. He traded Guthrie to the Colorado Rockies in exchange for Jason Hammel. He brought in new free agent starting pitcher Wei-Yin Chen from the Nippon Professional Baseball league, and Miguel González was signed as a minor league free agent. Nate McLouth was signed to a minor league deal in June 2012 and made a significant impact down the stretch. 2012 year also marked the debut of the much hyped prospect Manny Machado.

The Orioles won 93 games in 2012 (after winning 69 in the previous year) thanks in large part to a 29–9 record in one-run games, and a 16–2 record in extra inning games. The difference between this Orioles bullpen and bullpens past was like night and day, led by Jim Johnson and his 51 saves. He finished with a 2.49 earned run average, with Darren O'Day, Luis Ayala, Pedro Strop, and Troy Patton all finishing as well with earned run averages under 3.00. Experts were amazed as the team continued to outperform expectations, but regression never came that year. They battled with the New York Yankees for first place in the AL East until September, and earned their first playoff berth in 15 years by winning the second wild-card spot in the American League.

In the 'sudden death' wild-card game against the Texas Rangers, Joe Saunders (acquired in August of that year in exchange for Matt Lindstrom) defeated Yu Darvish, and the Orioles advance to the divisional round, where they faced a familiar opponent, the Yankees. The Orioles forced the series to go five games (losing games 1 and 3 of the series, while winning 2 and 4), but CC Sabathia outpitched the Orioles' Jason Hammel in Game 5 and the Orioles were eliminated from the playoffs.

=== Back to the playoffs (2015–2016) ===
On April 26, the Orioles scored 18 runs against the Boston Red Sox, the most runs they had scored in a single game, since they defeated the Cleveland Indians 18–9 on April 19, 2006. The Orioles beat the Red Sox 18–7. On June 16, the Orioles scored 19 runs against the Philadelphia Phillies, making it the most runs the Orioles scored since earlier in the season against the Red Sox. The Orioles had 8 home runs during the game, a franchise record. The team then later got their 5000th win as the Orioles on June 28 with a shutout 4–0 win over the Indians. On August 16, the Orioles defeated the Oakland Athletics 18–2, during which the team tied a franchise record for hits in a single game with 26. On September 11, the Orioles rallied from a two-run deficit of 6–4 in the bottom of the 8th inning against the Kansas City Royals. The Orioles won the game 14–8. The rally included left fielder Nolan Reimold and designated hitter Steve Clevenger both hitting their first career grand slam home runs, making the Orioles the only franchise in major league history to hit multiple grand slams in the same inning in two different games, the last time being in 1986. On September 30, in a reverse of fortune, the Toronto Blue Jays clinched the AL East with a win over the Orioles in Baltimore where they had watched the Orioles celebrate their division title clinch the previous year.

Despite the 2016 season being another above .500 season for the Orioles, they failed to win their division, but were able to secure a wild card spot. However, they lost against the Toronto Blue Jays in the AL Wild Card game.

=== Rebuilding (2017–2022) ===
==== 2017 season ====
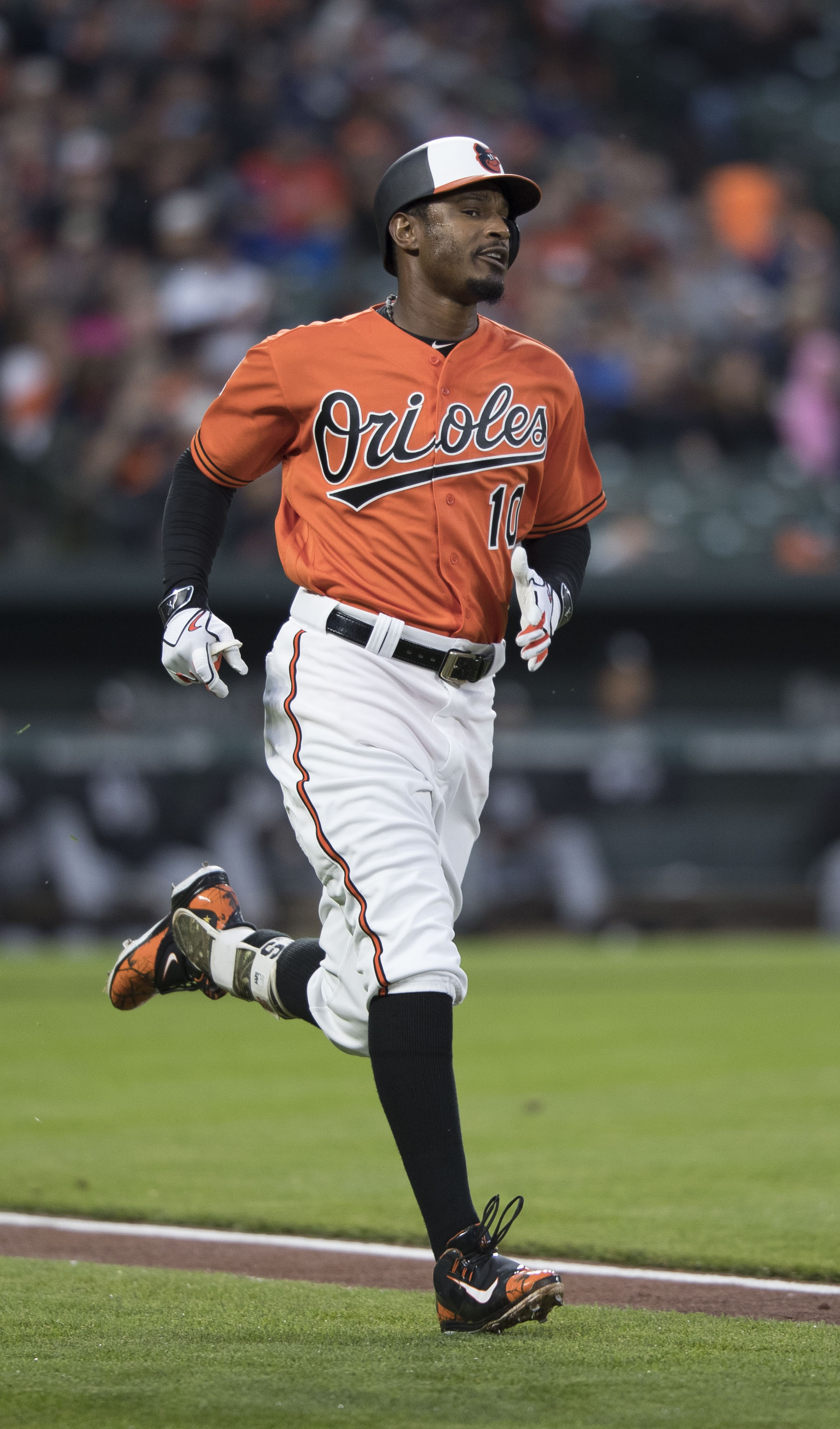
Adam Jones in 2017

The 2017 season was the Orioles' first losing season since the 2011 season. They finished 75–87 and last place in the American League East.

==== 2018 season ====
The 2018 Orioles broke the record of most losses in franchise history, and instead of improving from their 75–87 finish from the previous season, they became the first team since the 2003 Detroit Tigers to win fewer than 50 games and the first to lose at least 110 games since the 2013 Houston Astros.

==== 2019 season ====
By late August, the 2019 Orioles had lost twice as many games as they had won. Home runs were being hit at a record pace across the league, and on August 22, the team set a single-season MLB record for home runs allowed (12 years to the day where they lost 30–3 to the Texas Rangers). They ended with a record of 54–108, good for the second overall pick in the 2020 MLB draft.

==== 2020 season ====
Despite having a shortened 60-game season, the Orioles were contenders for a playoff spot and at one point they were 20–21 before fading to a 25–35 record, still the best Orioles team since 2017.

==== 2021 season ====
In 2021, Trey Mancini returned from colon cancer and was named the AL Comeback Player of the Year. Cedric Mullins became the second player in franchise history to join the 30–30 club. Nevertheless, the Orioles fell to 52–110, tying with the Arizona Diamondbacks for the worst record in the major leagues.

==== 2022 season ====
In 2022, the Orioles had their first winning season since 2016, finishing fourth in the AL East with an 83–79 record. They became the first team since the 1899 St. Louis Perfectos to lose 110 games in one season and post a winning record in the next.

On June 9, 2022, Louis Angelos sued his brother, Orioles chairman and CEO John P. Angelos, and mother Georgia Angelos in Baltimore County Circuit Court. Louis Angelos claims that their father intended for the brothers and their mother to share control of the team. The lawsuit states the elder Angelos collapsed in 2017 due to heart problems and established a trust with his wife and sons as co-trustees. Louis Angelos is seeking to have his brother and mother removed as co-trustees of the trust that controls the Orioles and removed as co-agents of Peter Angelos' power of attorney.

The suit claims Georgia Angelos wants to sell the team and an advisor attempted to negotiate a sale in 2020 but John Angelos vetoed a potential deal. The suit claims Angelos unilaterally fired long-time employees loyal to his father, including former center fielder Brady Anderson, the longtime special assistant to the executive vice president for baseball operations. The suit claims John Angelos transferred tens of millions of dollars' worth of property out of his father's law firm and into a limited liability company controlled by his personal attorney.

In separate statements released by the team, Georgia and John Angelos refuted the claims.

In the event of any sale, Major League Baseball has reportedly encouraged Cal Ripken Jr to be part of any incoming ownership group that may take control of the team.

==== 2023 season ====
In April 2023, the Orioles went 19–9, setting a franchise record for wins in the month of April. By August 2023, the Orioles, led by a core of first-and-second-year players Adley Rutschman, Gunnar Henderson, Félix Bautista and Kyle Bradish, were in first place in the division and described in The Athletic as "young, fun and arguably the best story in baseball." However, the front office went under scrutiny when it was reported that play-by-play announcer Kevin Brown had been suspended indefinitely by the Orioles for his pregame remarks on MASN, the team-owned network, two weeks earlier. During a "seemingly benign" introduction to a series against the Tampa Bay Rays, Brown observed that the team had struggled to win a series in Tampa in the past several seasons. It was described in The Athletic as a "petty" move by John Angelos, "the only person [in the organization] with enough power that no one dare question the validity of anything he says and does, no matter how foolish it is." Several broadcasters came to Brown's defense after the news broke. Gary Cohen said the team had "draped itself in utter humiliation" and Michael Kay said the suspension made "the Orioles look so small and insignificant and minor league." Brown returned to broadcasting for the team and stated in a public message that "recent media reports [had] mischaracterized my relationship with my adopted hometown Orioles" and that his relationship with the team was "wonderful".

In May 2023, following the team's new water-themed celebrations, Camden Yards created a Bird Bath splash zone in left field, where fans in one section had the opportunity get sprayed by the water hose-wielding "Mr. Splash" following an Orioles extra base hit.

The Orioles finished the 2023 season with a record of 101–61, winning the American League East division for the first time since 2014, and claiming their first 100+ win season since 1980. On July 30, the pitching staff of Dean Kremer, Mike Baumann, Shintaro Fujinami, Danny Coulombe, and Yennier Canó combined to set a franchise record for the most strikeouts in a 9-inning game against the Yankees. The 2023 pitching staff also broke the Orioles franchise record of single-season strikeouts on September 6. However, the team's successful season ended in the postseason American League Division Series, with the Orioles losing three straight games to the Texas Rangers. The series sweep was the first time since the 2022 season that the Orioles had been swept in a series.

Manager Brandon Hyde was awarded 2023 AL Manager of the Year, and players Adley Rutschman and Gunnar Henderson both were awarded the Silver Slugger Award. Additionally, Henderson was voted unanimous AL Rookie of the Year, marking the first time the team had a ROY winner since Gregg Olson in 1989.

==== 2024 season ====
In January 2024, John Angelos reached a $1.7 billion deal to sell the Orioles to a group led by David Rubenstein, a Baltimore native and founder of The Carlyle Group. The group includes Cal Ripken, New York investment manager Michael Arougheti, former Baltimore mayor Kurt Schmoke, businessman Michael Bloomberg and NBA hall of famer Grant Hill. For tax reasons, the group will acquire 40% of the team with the Angelos family selling the remainder of Peter Angelos' stake after his death. The deal includes the Orioles' majority stake in MASN. Angelos died aged 94 on March 23, 2024; his death occurred four days before the sale of the Orioles was finalized.
