= List of Baltimore Orioles owners and executives =

== Owners ==
=== Milwaukee Brewers (1901) ===
- Henry Killilea

=== St. Louis Browns (1902–1953) ===
- Robert Hedges
- Phil Ball
- Phil Ball estate
- Donald Lee Barnes
- Richard Muckerman
- Bill DeWitt
- Bill Veeck

=== Baltimore Orioles (1954–present) ===
- Jerold Hoffberger & Clarence Miles
- Jerold Hoffberger & James Keelty
- Jerold Hoffberger & Joe Iglehart
- Jerold Hoffberger
- Edward Bennett Williams
- Eli Jacobs
- Peter Angelos
- David Rubenstein

== General Managers ==
- Bill DeWitt
- Bill Veeck
- Arthur Ehlers
- Paul Richards
- Lee MacPhail
- Harry Dalton
- Frank Cashen
- Hank Peters
- Roland Hemond
- Pat Gillick
- Frank Wren
- Syd Thrift
- Jim Beattie
- Jim Duquette
- Mike Flanagan
- Andy MacPhail
- Dan Duquette
- Mike Elias

== Other executives ==
- Brady Anderson
- John Angelos
- Don Buford
- Jim Duquette
- Tommy Giordano
- Gordon Goldsberry
- Lou Gorman
- Wayne Krivsky
- Larry Lucchino
- Kevin Malone
- Doug Melvin
- Dan O'Dowd
- Eddie Robinson
- Frank Robinson
- Bob Schaefer
- Lee Thomas
- Tom Trebelhorn
- William Walsingham Jr.
