= Miles & Stockbridge =

American law firm

Miles & Stockbridge P.C.
- Headquarters: Baltimore, Maryland, U.S.
- No. of offices: 8
- No. of attorneys: More than 200
- Major practice areas: General practice
- Date founded: 1932; 94 years ago
- Founder: Clarence W. Miles, A. Seymour O'Brien
- Company type: Professional corporation
- Website: mslaw.com

Miles & Stockbridge P.C. is an American law firm headquartered in Baltimore, with additional offices elsewhere in Maryland, as well as in Virginia, Washington, D.C., and New York City.

== History ==
The firm was founded in 1932 when Baltimore attorney Clarence W. Miles opened a law practice with A. Seymour O'Brien. Miles later became the first president of the Baltimore Orioles and a founder of the Greater Baltimore Committee. In 1953, the firm took its current name after merging with Mullikin, Stockbridge & Waters, a firm founded by Enos Stockbridge.

The firm's principals elected Nancy W. Greene as chairman in 2018, making her the first woman to lead the firm in its 86-year history. Greene was succeeded as chairman by Scott Wilson in February 2026.

Three attorneys left the firm's Richmond, Virginia office in April 2023 to join rival firm O'Hagan Meyer, leaving Miles & Stockbridge with two lawyers running that office. The firm went on to complete a merger with Krooth & Altman, a Washington, D.C.-based real estate finance boutique, in December 2024, adding 30 lawyers and bringing the combined firm to more than 200 attorneys.

== Practice areas ==
As of 2026, Miles & Stockbridge had more than 200 attorneys. The firm practices across a range of areas, including bankruptcy and restructuring, corporate and mergers and acquisitions, employee benefits and executive compensation, government contracts, health care, immigration, insurance, labor and employment, litigation, public finance, real estate, and white collar and government investigations.

== Recognition ==
Miles & Stockbridge has received a national Band 1 ranking from Chambers USA for its government contracts practice for six consecutive years, and for its work advising real estate investment trusts (REITs) for seven consecutive years.

== Litigation ==
In 2017, former equity principal Donald E. English Jr. sued Miles & Stockbridge in Baltimore City Circuit Court, alleging the firm had reduced his salary and withheld nearly $60,000 in compensation after his resignation. Testimony at trial in 2018 included accounts from two other former firm attorneys who said they had also not been paid outstanding wages or capital contributions after leaving the firm. The case was resolved through a confidential settlement in 2019.
