= Phil Ball (baseball) =

American baseball executive

Philip Ball
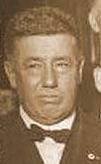
- Philip Ball in 1920

Personal information
- Born: October 22, 1864 Keokuk, Iowa, U.S.
- Died: October 22, 1933 (aged 69) St. Louis, Missouri, U.S.
- Resting place: Bellefontaine Cemetery
- Years active: 1914—1933

Sport
- Team: As owner: St. Louis Terriers (1914—1915); St. Louis Browns (1916—1933)

Philip De Catesby Ball (October 22, 1864 – October 22, 1933) was the owner of the St. Louis Terriers of the Federal League from 1914 through 1915 and the St. Louis Browns of the American League from 1916 through 1933.

== Biography ==
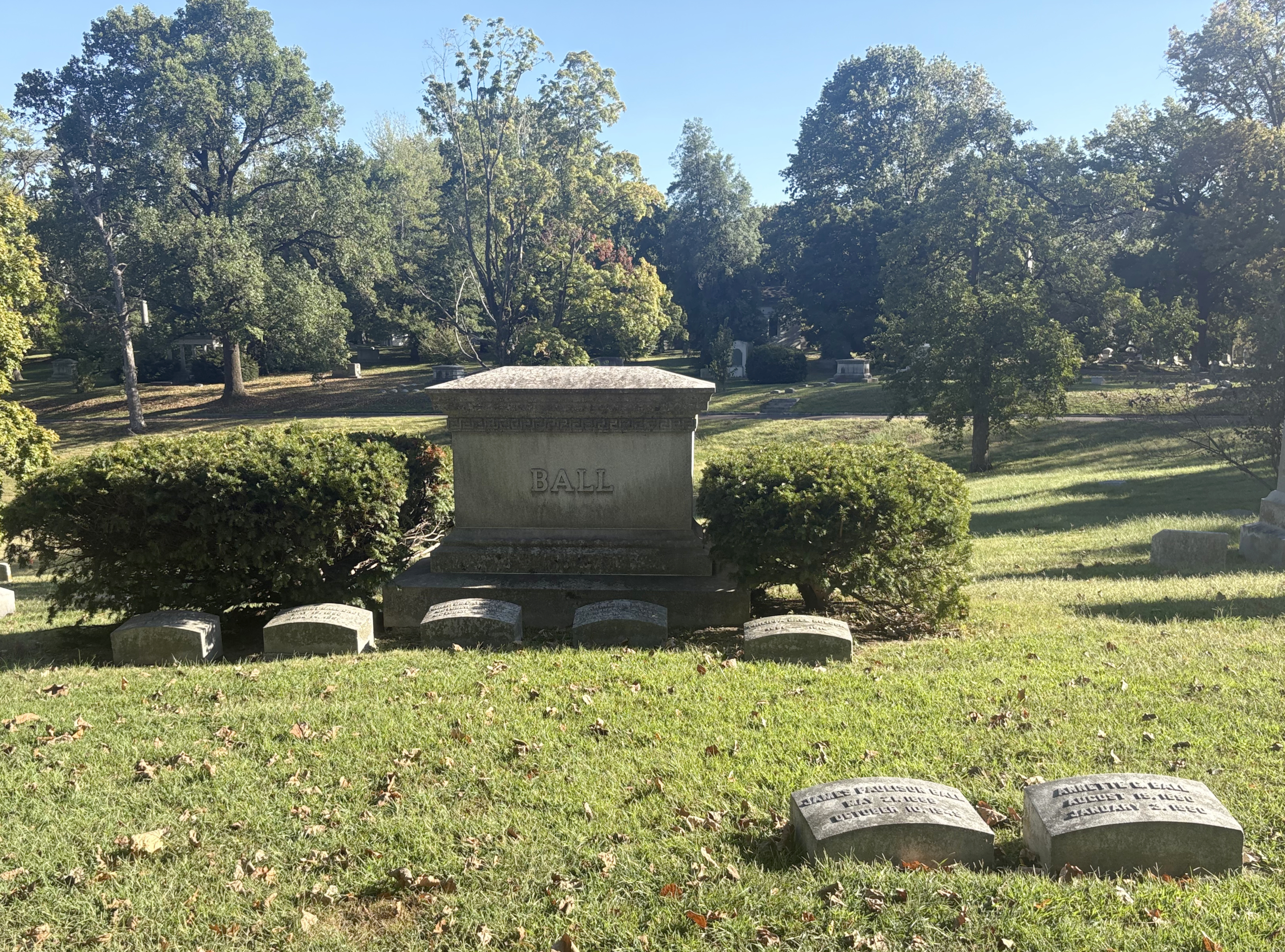
Ball's grave at Bellefontaine Cemetery

Phil Ball was born in Keokuk, Iowa. He became wealthy through the ownership of the Federal Cold Storage Company refrigeration company in St. Louis; he expanded his holdings to include oil wells, ranch lands, and urban commercial real estate. He was considered the Federal League owner most committed to the development of a permanent third major league.

As the Federal League's bidding war with the established clubs took a financial toll on its owners, Ball remained committed to stocking a competitive roster. His strategy undermined the bottom line of the Terriers, Browns, and St. Louis Cardinals. As part of a final settlement, Robert Hedges sold the Browns to Ball, who was subsequently able to transfer a number of players from his folded club to his new franchise.

Ball died of sepsis in St. Louis on October 22, 1933, and was buried at Bellefontaine Cemetery.

== Legacy ==
Ball is perhaps best known for demoting pioneering baseball executive Branch Rickey from general manager to business manager in 1915, which led to his departure for the Cardinals. He considered Rickey's ideas, such as the development of an integrated farm system, to be too radical for the time; however, he also sought to prevent other teams from experimenting with these ideas by unsuccessfully seeking a court order to vacate Rickey's 1917 contract with the Browns' crosstown rivals.

Amid the poor fortunes of the team both financially and on the field, Ball's estate continued to own the Browns after his death until 1936, when the team was sold to Donald Lee Barnes.
