= Joseph Iglehart =

American baseball executive

- Born: November 15, 1891; Baltimore, Maryland, U.S.
- Died: November 16, 1979 (aged 88); Lutherville, Maryland, U.S.
- Occupation(s): Banker, broadcasting and baseball executive

Joseph Alexander Wilson Iglehart (November 15, 1891 – November 16, 1979) was an American financier who also was an executive for the Columbia Broadcasting System (CBS) and two Major League Baseball (MLB) franchises.

Born in Baltimore, Maryland on November 15, 1891, he graduated from the Boys' Latin School of Maryland in 1910 and Cornell University in 1914. He served in the American military during World War I, becoming the youngest major in the United States Army at the time of his appointment in 1917.

After the war, he was employed as an investment banker by the Wall Street stockbrokerage firm W. E. Hutton & Co., where he eventually became a partner. He was later associated with CBS as an investor, chairman of the finance committee and, for 47 years starting in 1932, a member of the board of directors.

He was one of the investors in a Clarence Miles-led group that successfully purchased the St. Louis Browns from Bill Veeck on September 29, 1953, moving the franchise to Baltimore and renaming it the Orioles for the 1954 season. He was appointed the team's chairman of the board after Miles' resignation in early November, 1955. Iglehart eventually became the largest individual shareholder, with a 32% stake in the ballclub, which emerged as a legitimate pennant contender by 1960 on the strength of its scouting, player development and farm system.

Iglehart was in violation of MLB conflict of interest rules when CBS' purchase of an 80% investment in the New York Yankees was approved by American League team owners on August 13, 1964. He was ordered by league president Joe Cronin to sell his interest in either the Orioles or CBS. He ended up selling his 64,000 shares to another original Orioles investor, the National Brewing Company, for $1.6 million on May 25, 1965. The brewery gained controlling interest at 65%, with its president, Jerold Hoffberger, succeeding Iglehart as board chairman.

Oddly enough, the day after the sale, the National Gypsum Company (now part of Lafarge), another enterprise of which he was on the board, rechristened in his honor a deep sea tanker that was converted into what was then the world's largest self-unloading cement-carrying lake freighter, the J.A.W. Iglehart.

After leaving the Orioles, he served on the Yankees' board of directors until the team was sold in January, 1973 to an investment group led by George Steinbrenner. He spent one more season with the Bronx Bombers as a consulting partner.

Iglehart died in Lutherville, Maryland on November 16, 1979, just one day after his 88th birthday.

== Bibliography ==
- Miller, James Edward. The Baseball Business. Chapel Hill, NC: The University of North Carolina Press, 1990.
- Smith, Sally Bedell. In All His Glory: The Life & Times of William S. Paley. New York: Simon & Schuster, 1990.
- New York Yankees Official 1973 Yearbook.
