= Jerold Hoffberger =

American businessman

- Born: April 7, 1919
- Died: April 9, 1999 (aged 80)
- Employer: National Brewing Company

Jerold Charles Hoffberger (April 7, 1919 – April 9, 1999) was an American businessman. He was president of the National Brewing Company from 1946 to 1973. He was also part-owner of the Baltimore Orioles of the American League from 1954 to 1965, and majority owner from 1965 to 1979.

== Biography ==
Hoffberger was a lifelong resident of Baltimore, Maryland, and was Jewish. He was the only son of his father Samuel, a lawyer who was active in the Democratic Party and a major shareholder and board chairman of National Brewing. His grandfather Charles had been a local merchant who sold wood, coal and ice. Hoffberger attended the University of Virginia. During World War II, he served in the United States Army with the 1st Armored Division in Africa, France and Italy, where he was wounded near Lake Bracciano, northwest of Rome. Jerold Hoffberger was also involved in the Battle of Monte Cassino.

=== Business career ===
The year after the war ended, he was appointed president of the brewery by his father after the death of his predecessor, Arthur Deute. Under the younger Hoffberger's command, National's sales rose from 230,000 barrels in 1946 to two million in 1966.

==== Baltimore Orioles ====
In 1953, when the St. Louis Browns of baseball's American League wanted to move to Baltimore, the nearby Washington Senators, led by Clark Griffith, objected to the potential encroachment on their market. Hoffberger helped ease the way for the move by making his National Bohemian beer a Senators sponsor. When Browns owner Bill Veeck was all but forced to sell the team, Hoffberger and attorney Clarence Miles put together a syndicate that bought the team for $2.5 million and moved it to Baltimore as the Orioles.

Hoffberger was the largest single shareholder in the Orioles, but was initially a silent partner with Miles (1954–1955), James Keelty (1955–1960) and Joe Iglehart (1960–1965). During this time, however, he bought more and more stock until he acquired controlling interest in 1965. He immediately brought in Frank Cashen, National's advertising director, as executive vice president. Under the direction of Cashen and general manager Harry Dalton, the Orioles won four AL pennants and two World Series from 1966 to 1971.

Even though the Orioles were a success on the diamond, the team struggled financially because of lagging attendance. Looking to sell his ballclub and brewery, Hoffberger engaged in talks for three months with the Labatt Brewing Company, which was attempting to entice a major-league franchise to move to Toronto. Negotiations ended when National agreed to a merger with Carling Brewery on October 14, 1975, and a result of the consolidation was Hoffberger becoming chairman and chief executive officer of the newly formed Carling National Breweries, Inc. He retained ownership of the Orioles, which were not included in the transaction, but could not sell the team without company approval.

Hoffberger cast the lone dissenting ballot when the American League owners voted to award the Toronto expansion franchise to an investment group led by Labatt on March 26, 1976. He had arranged the only other competing bid, which was fronted by Phil Granovsky, chairman of the Atlantic Packaging Company, and had the potential financial support of Carling's advertising money, but the attempt wasn't successful due to the Labatt's group having nearly purchased the San Francisco Giants with the intention of transferring it to Toronto. Hoffberger stated, "It was just not in the best interests of my company for Labatt’s to get the franchise."

He was a 1996 honoree into the Orioles Hall of Fame, inducted with Cal Ripken, Sr. and Billy Hunter. 400 showed up at the luncheon at the Sheraton Inner Harbor Hotel.

When Baltimore Oriole star Frank Robinson was inducted into the Baseball Hall of Fame in 1982, he made reference to Hoffberger. He said that after a game, Hoffberger "wouldn't come over and slap you on the back and say nice game-winning home run, nice double, nice play or whatever. The first words out of his mouth were: 'How are you? How's your family? Is there anything I can do for you?'."

Hoffberger sold his controlling interest in the Orioles to Edward Bennett Williams for $12 million on August 2, 1979, with the transaction being approved unanimously by American League team owners 11 1/2 weeks later on October 22. The Orioles in his final year of ownership fell one victory short of winning the 1979 World Series, set a new franchise season attendance record and earned a $1.5 million profit.

=== Later life ===
Hoffberger was known for his charitable contributions, which included assistance to Johns Hopkins Hospital, the University of Maryland and Goucher College. Town & Country magazine estimated in 1983 that he had donated more than $10 million to charities.

in the early 1970s, Hoffberger purchased a farm near Woodbine called Sunset Hill Farm (formerly Helmore Farm) in Howard County, Maryland where he bred Thoroughbred horses for racing. While primarily a breeder, he did race horses on his own, notably winning the 1984 Razorback Handicap at Oaklawn Park Race Track.

Hoffberger died at Sinai Hospital in Baltimore, two days after his 80th birthday.
