= Lee MacPhail =

American baseball executive (1917-2012)

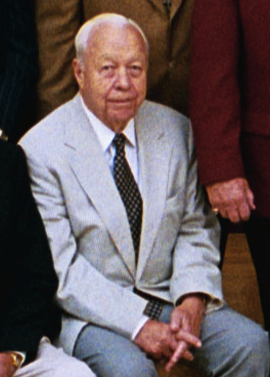
- MacPhail at the White House for a Baseball Hall of Fame luncheon in 2004
- Born: October 25, 1917; Nashville, Tennessee, U.S.
- Died: November 8, 2012 (aged 95); Delray Beach, Florida, U.S.
- Education: Swarthmore College (B.A.)
- Occupation: Baseball executive
- Spouse: Jane Hamilton (m. 1940; died 1972) Gwen Brandt (m. 1974; died 2002)
- Children: 3, including Andy
- Parents: Larry MacPhail (father); Inez Thompson (mother)
- Relatives: Bill MacPhail (brother)
- Baseball career

Teams
- As general manager: Baltimore Orioles (1959–1965); New York Yankees (1967–1973)

Member of the National

Baseball Hall of Fame
- Induction: 1998
- Election method: Veterans Committee

Leland Stanford MacPhail Jr. (October 25, 1917 – November 8, 2012) was an American front-office executive in Major League Baseball. MacPhail was a baseball executive for 45 years, serving as the director of player personnel for the New York Yankees, the president and general manager of the Baltimore Orioles, chief aide to Commissioner of Baseball William Eckert, executive vice president and general manager of the Yankees, and president of the American League.

== Four-generation baseball family ==
Born in Nashville, Tennessee, he was the son of Larry MacPhail (Leland S. MacPhail Sr.), front office executive with the Cincinnati Reds, Brooklyn Dodgers and the Yankees. Larry and Lee MacPhail are the only father-and-son pair to be inducted into the Baseball Hall of Fame. Lee was honored in 1998.

His brother Bill MacPhail was president of CBS Sports and later became president of CNN Sports, recruited by Ted Turner to create the department when CNN was launched.

Lee MacPhail's son Andy has been a senior executive with four MLB clubs: general manager of the Minnesota Twins (1986–94), president/CEO of the Chicago Cubs (1994–2006), president/baseball operations of the Orioles (2007–11), and president of the Philadelphia Phillies (2015–20). Son Lee MacPhail III had begun a career in baseball and was an executive with the Reading Phillies of the Eastern League upon his untimely death at age 27 in an automobile accident on February 18, 1969. In addition, grandson Lee MacPhail IV has been active in baseball as a scout or scouting director for numerous teams, including the Orioles, Twins, New York Mets, Seattle Mariners, Cleveland Indians, Washington Nationals and Texas Rangers.

== Front office career ==
Lee MacPhail graduated from Swarthmore College and entered baseball in his father's Brooklyn Dodger organization, became business manager of the Toronto Maple Leafs of the International League in 1942, then served in the United States Navy during World War II. He joined the Yankees in 1946 as general manager of their Kansas City Blues Triple-A farm team, a year after Larry MacPhail became a co-owner of the Bombers.

The younger MacPhail rose through the Yankees system, eventually becoming farm system director in 1948 (after his father sold his one-third share and left baseball) and contributing to the organization's seven World Series championships from 1949 to 1958. He then moved to the Baltimore Orioles front office as general manager and, later, club president. During MacPhail's seven-year stewardship (1959–65), the Orioles became pennant contenders in the American League, winning 612 of 1,118 games (.547) and finishing in the league's first division four times. Led by Most Valuable Player Brooks Robinson, the 1964 Orioles finished only two games behind the pennant-winning Yankees.

At the time of his departure for the commissioner's office in November 1965, MacPhail and his successor, Harry Dalton, were beginning negotiations with the Reds for a blockbuster trade that would bring Frank Robinson to Baltimore; Robinson would lead the Orioles to the 1966 world championship and win the American League Triple Crown and Most Valuable Player award.

After a brief term as top aide to the new commissioner, Eckert, in 1965–66, MacPhail served as the Yankees' general manager from October 14, 1966, through the 1973 season, a rebuilding phase that saw no pennants or postseason appearances. However, it was marked by the promotion of Bobby Murcer and Thurman Munson to the club, and the 1972 acquisitions, via trade, of Sparky Lyle and Graig Nettles; Munson, Lyle and Nettles would be major pieces when the Yankees returned to the top of the American League from 1976 to 1978. Overall, the Yankees compiled a record of 569–557 (.505) during MacPhail's term as GM, with one second-place finish (in 1970).

After the 1973 season, in late October, MacPhail was elected the fifth American League president, serving from January 1, 1974, to December 31, 1983. In replacing Joe Cronin, he moved the league's headquarters to New York City from Boston.

Although no AL franchise moved during MacPhail's term, he was in office for the dawning of the free agency era in 1976, and nine of the 12 league clubs in existence in 1974 underwent ownership changes. MacPhail also oversaw the league's 1977 expansion to 14 teams with the creation of the Toronto Blue Jays and the Seattle Mariners, and was credited with bringing an end to the 1981 baseball strike when he stepped in for the owners to handle stalled negotiations. During his ten full years in office, the American League continued to struggle against the National League in All-Star Game competition: it lost the first nine midsummer classics it played under MacPhail's presidency, winning only in his last season, 1983, by a 13–3 score. The Junior Circuit compiled a 4–6 mark in World Series play over the same period.

MacPhail also played a major role in the Pine Tar Incident in 1983, where he ruled on a protested game stemming from a home run that had been taken away from Kansas City Royals slugger George Brett. After his retirement as AL president, MacPhail spent two final years in baseball as chairman of Major League Baseball's Player Relations Committee.

=== Record as general manager ===
Team	Year	Regular season					Postseason			
Team	Year	Games	Won	Lost	Win %	Finish	Won	Lost	Win %	Result
BAL	1959	154	74	80	.481	6th in AL	–	–	–	–
BAL	1960	154	89	65	.578	2nd in AL	–	–	–	–
BAL	1961	162	95	67	.586	3rd in AL	–	–	–	–
BAL	1962	162	77	85	.475	7th in AL	–	–	–	–
BAL	1963	162	86	76	.531	4th in AL	–	–	–	–
BAL	1964	162	97	65	.599	3rd in AL	–	–	–	–
BAL	1965	162	94	68	.580	3rd in AL	–	–	–	–
BAL total		1,118	612	506	.547		0	0	–	
NYY	1967	162	72	90	.444	9th in AL	–	–	–	–
NYY	1968	162	83	79	.512	5th in AL	–	–	–	–
NYY	1969	162	80	81	.497	5th in AL East	–	–	–	–
NYY	1970	162	93	69	.574	2nd in AL East	–	–	–	–
NYY	1971	162	82	80	.506	4th in AL East	–	–	–	–
NYY	1972	155	79	76	.510	4th in AL East	–	–	–	–
NYY	1973	162	80	82	.494	4th in AL East	–	–	–	–
NYY total		1,127	569	557	.505		0	0	–	
Total		2,245	1,181	1,063	.526		0	0	–	

== Later life ==
MacPhail lived in Delray Beach, Florida, where he died November 8, 2012, at his home. He was 95. At time of his death he was the oldest living Hall of Famer.

== Honors and awards ==
When he was elected to the Baseball Hall of Fame in 1998, he joined Larry MacPhail, who had been elected in 1978, as its only father and son members.

In 1966, he received the Sporting News Executive of the Year Award. MacPhail had spent 1966 as assistant to the Commissioner of Baseball prior to taking over the Yankees' general manager post. The award was bestowed for his efforts in building the 1966 World Series champion Orioles.

The American League Championship Series Most Valuable Player Award is named for Lee MacPhail.

In 2013, the Bob Feller Act of Valor Award honored MacPhail as one of 37 Baseball Hall of Fame members for his service in the United States Navy during World War II.

== Footnotes ==
Preceded by Paul Richards	Baltimore Orioles General Manager; 1958–1965	Succeeded by Harry Dalton
Preceded by Dan Topping, Jr.	New York Yankees General Manager; 1966–1974	Succeeded by Gabe Paul
