= James Keelty =

James S. Keelty Jr. (December 23, 1911 – August 26, 2003) was part-owner of the Baltimore Orioles of the American League from 1954 to 1959.

Keelty was a Baltimore-area real estate developer who started James Keelty & Co. Inc. with his younger brother Joseph in 1946. He was also one of the investors in a group headed by Clarence Miles who had led the effort to bring the Orioles to Baltimore. He succeeded Miles as team president in early November 1955, stepping down in favor of Lee MacPhail at the end of the 1959 season.
