= St. Louis Browns =

North American professional baseball team (1902–1954)

Logo	Cap insignia

Information
- League: American League (1902–1953)
- Ballpark: Sportsman's Park (1902–1953)
- Established: 1902 (moved from Milwaukee, where they played as the Brewers)
- Relocated: 1954 (to Baltimore; became the Baltimore Orioles)
- Nickname: The Brownies
- World Series championships: None
- American League pennant: 1 (1944)
- Colors: Brown, orange, white
- Mascot: Brownie the Elf (1951–1953)
- Retired numbers: None
- Ownership: List of owners: Robert Hedges (1902–1915); Philip De Catesby Ball (1916–1933); Ball estate (1933–1936); Donald Lee Barnes (1936–1945); Richard Muckerman (1945–1948); Bill DeWitt (1948–1950); Bill Veeck (1951–1953)
- Manager: List of managers: Jimmy McAleer (1902–1909); Jack O'Connor (1910); Bobby Wallace (1911–1912); George Stovall (1912–1913); Jimmy Austin (1913); Branch Rickey (1913–1915); Fielder Jones (1916–1918); Jimmy Austin (1918); Jimmy Burke (1918–1920); Lee Fohl (1921–1923); Jimmy Austin (1923); George Sisler (1924–1926); Dan Howley (1927–1929); Bill Killefer (1930–1933); Allen Sothoron (1933); Rogers Hornsby (1933–1937); Jim Bottomley (1937); Gabby Street (1938); Oscar Melillo (1938); Fred Haney (1939–1941); Luke Sewell (1941–1946); Zack Taylor (1946); Muddy Ruel (1947); Zack Taylor (1948–1951); Rogers Hornsby (1952); Marty Marion (1952–1953)

The St. Louis Browns were a Major League Baseball (MLB) team that originated in Milwaukee, Wisconsin, as the Milwaukee Brewers. A charter member of the American League (AL), the Brewers moved to St. Louis, Missouri, after the 1901 season, where they played for 52 years as the St. Louis Browns.

After the 1953 season, the team moved to Baltimore, Maryland, where it became the Baltimore Orioles. The last two surviving former St. Louis Brown players, Ed Mickelson and Billy Hunter, died only six days apart on June 27 and July 3, 2025, respectively.

The St. Louis Browns had an overall win–loss record of 3,414–4,465–96 (.434) during their 52 years in St. Louis. They were the least successful of the eight charter members of the AL, winning only one pennant and finishing fifth or worse 40 times.

The St. Louis Browns are represented by two players in the National Baseball Hall of Fame, Bobby Wallace and George Sisler.

== Before 1902 ==
In the late 19th century, the team was formed as the Milwaukee Brewers in the Western League. For the 1900 season, the Western League was renamed the "American League", and in 1901, league president Ban Johnson declared it a major league.

The team was originally owned by Milwaukee lawyers Matthew and Henry Killilea. As a minor league team, the Brewers had usually fielded subpar teams until Connie Mack became manager in 1894. The Killileas were among the poorer owners in the league, and did not have the resources to take advantage of the large number of National League players transferring to the AL. Of the 100 frontline players who switched leagues, only three signed with the Brewers. When Mack transferred to the Philadelphia Athletics at Johnson's behest as manager and part owner, one of the three players who jumped to the Brewers, Hugh Duffy, became player-manager.

Johnson knew the Brewers could not be viable in Milwaukee, and originally intended to move them to St. Louis, a larger market. At the time, St. Louis was the fourth-largest city in the nation, while Milwaukee was the 15th. However, Matthew Killilea persuaded Johnson to give the Brewers what amounted to a one-year trial in Milwaukee, saying that he would agree to move to St. Louis if the team did not make a good account of itself that year. Due to a lack of talent, the Brewers made a wretched showing. They never recovered from an 0–5 start, and crumbled to last place for good on June 30. They finished 48–89, the worst record in baseball, 35.5 games behind the pennant-winning Chicago White Sox. The team had additionally struggled with extended absences from Killilea, who spent most of the season battling tuberculosis and died on July 27. Henry was forced to become operating head of the team.

Under the circumstances, a move to St. Louis seemed a foregone conclusion. At a league meeting in Chicago, the Killileas requested and received permission to move. Soon after moving, the team changed its name to the Browns, a reference to the original name of the St. Louis Cardinals, which were known from the 1880s until 1900 as the Brown Stockings. Johnson then set about finding local ownership for the team, and found it in a syndicate headed by an old friend from his days as a sportswriter, Kansas City carriagemaker Robert Hedges, who moved to St. Louis soon after the purchase closed. Hedges became team secretary, while ceding the presidency to St. Louis businessman Ralph Orthwein. However, Hedges was the undisputed head of the franchise long before taking the presidency himself in 1903. He built a new park on the site of the original Browns' former venue, Sportsman's Park.

== 1902–1921 ==
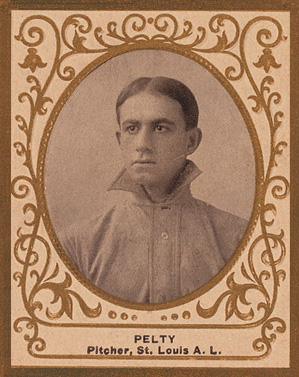
Barney Pelty

In their first season in St. Louis, the Browns finished second under manager Jimmy McAleer, five games behind Philadelphia. This was mainly because Hedges and McAleer persuaded six Cardinals to transfer to the Browns. They looked to become even more powerful in 1903 when Hedges signed New York Giants ace Christy Mathewson to a deal that would have paid him almost four times what he was earning in New York. However, as part of the settlement that ended the war with the National League, Hedges and Mathewson tore up the contract. Years later, Hedges said that while he knew he was likely giving up a pennant by relinquishing Mathewson to the Giants, bringing peace to the game was more important.

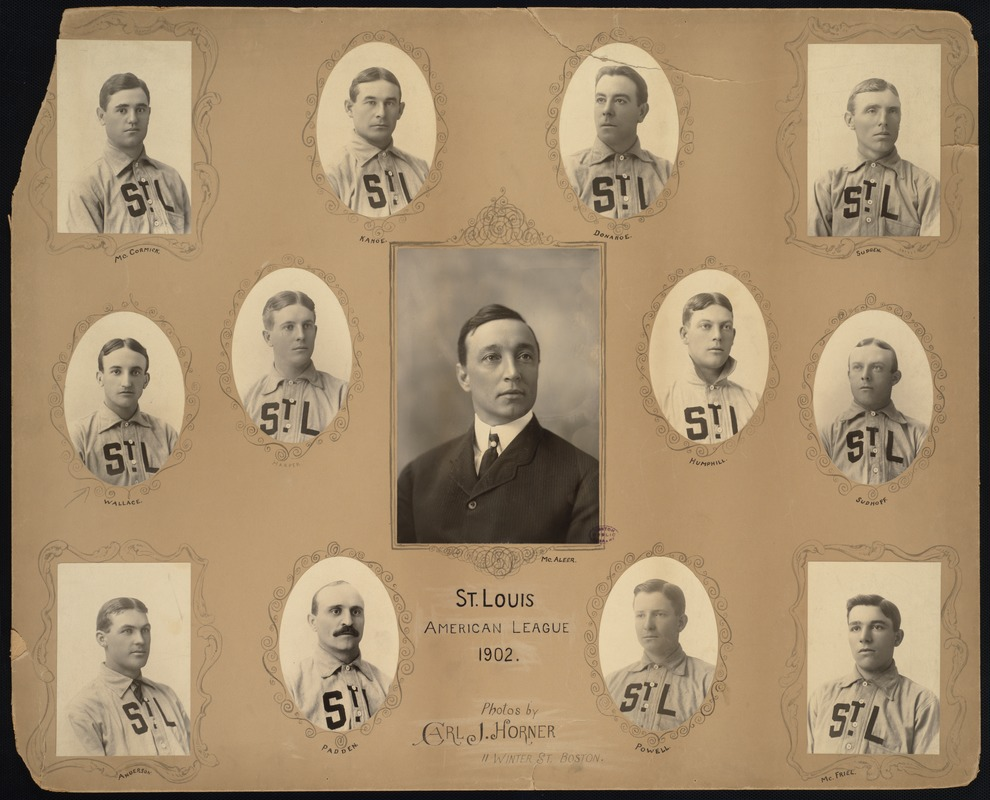
St. Louis Browns baseball team, 1902

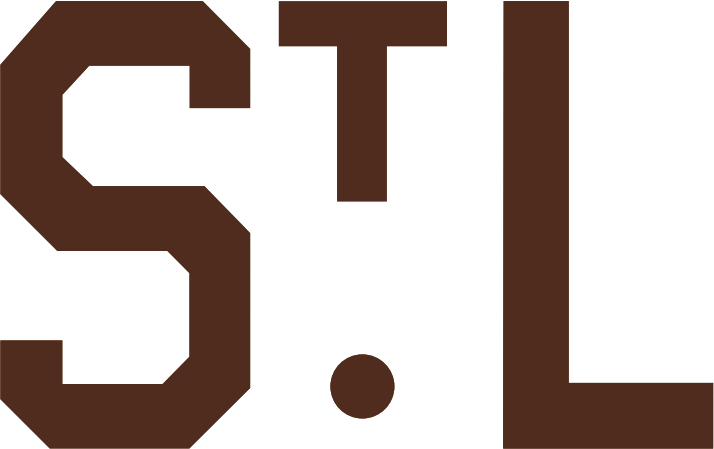
St.Louis Browns logo 1902 to 1905

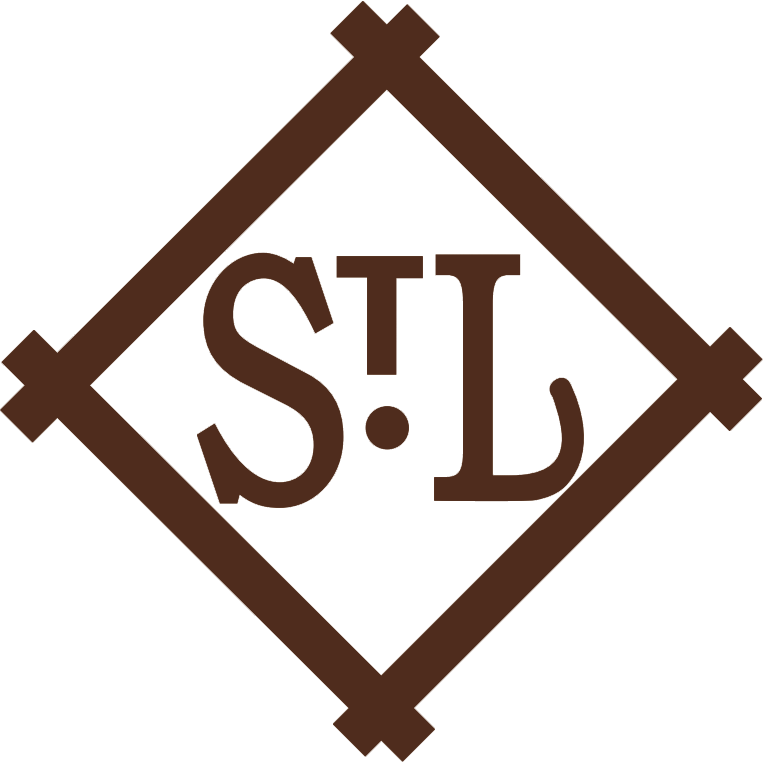
St. Louis Browns logo 1909 to 1910

Although the Browns had only four winning seasons from 1902 to 1922, they were very popular at the gate during their first two decades in St. Louis. They trounced the Cardinals in attendance; in 1908, for instance, they attracted four times as many fans as the Cardinals. Pitcher Barney Pelty was a workhorse for the Browns and a member of their starting rotation from 1904, when he pitched 31 complete games and 301 innings through 1911. In 1909, the Browns rebuilt Sportsman's Park as the third concrete-and-steel park in the major leagues.

During this time, the Browns were best known for their role in the race for the 1910 American League batting title. Ty Cobb took off the last game of the season, believing that his slight lead over Nap Lajoie, of the Cleveland Naps, would hold up unless Lajoie had a near-perfect day at the plate. However, the Browns players decided to help Lajoie win the title over the unpopular Cobb. Browns' manager Jack O'Connor went along with the plan, since the game would have no bearing on the pennant race. O'Connor ordered rookie third baseman Red Corriden to play on the outfield grass. This all but conceded a hit for any ball Lajoie bunted. Lajoie bunted five straight times down the third base line and made it to first easily. On his last at-bat, Lajoie reached base on an error – officially giving him a hitless at-bat. O'Connor and coach Harry Howell tried to bribe the official scorer, a woman, to change the call to a hit – even offering to buy her a new wardrobe.

St. Louis Browns primary logo, 1911–1914.

Cobb won the batting title by just a few thousandths of a point over Lajoie, but it was later reported that one game may have been counted twice in the statistics, and rumors existed about the attempted bribery, causing a scandal about the rankings. After news broke of the scandal, a writer for the St. Louis Post claimed: "All St. Louis is up in arms over the deplorable spectacle, conceived in stupidity and executed in jealousy." The resulting outcry triggered an investigation by Johnson. At his insistence, Hedges fired O'Connor and Howell; both men were informally banned from baseball for life.

After several pedestrian seasons, Hedges hired former Browns catcher Branch Rickey as business manager (de facto general manager) midway through the 1913 season and made him manager, as well, in September. Although Rickey had been a mediocre player at best, he had a keen eye for spotting talent. His greatest find was George Sisler, who had played for Rickey at Michigan. They fell back to sixth in 1915, but won 79 games in 1916, their first winning record in eight years.

In 1916, as part of the settlement that ended the war with the Federal League, Hedges sold the Browns to refrigeration magnate Philip DeCatesby Ball, who had owned the defunct league's St. Louis Terriers. Concluding that Rickey's talents were better suited to the front office, he named Fielder Jones as manager, while Rickey remained de facto general manager. Under Ball's early tenure, the club had its first sustained period of success on the field; they were a contender for most of the early 1920s.

However, analysts think Ball made a series of blunders that would ultimately doom the franchise. Shortly after buying the team, he allowed Rickey to accept the presidency of the Cardinals. When Johnson got wind of this, he told Ball in no uncertain terms that Rickey could not be allowed to go to the National League. However, since Rickey had a signed contract, Ball was only able to keep Rickey on his payroll for another 24 hours; Rickey was replaced by Bob Quinn. Four years later, Ball allowed the Cardinals to move out of dilapidated Robison Field and share Sportsman's Park with the Browns. Rickey and owner Sam Breadon used the proceeds from the Robison Field sale to build baseball's first modern farm system. This effort eventually produced several star players, who brought the Cardinals more drawing power than the Browns.

== 1922–1940 ==
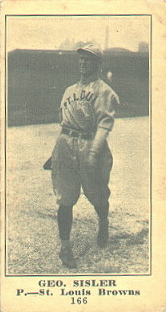
George Sisler

The 1922 Browns excited their owner by almost beating the Yankees to a pennant. The club was boasting the best players in franchise history, including future Hall of Famer George Sisler and an outfield trio of Ken Williams, Baby Doll Jacobson, and Jack Tobin, who batted .300 or better from 1919 to 1923 and in 1925. In 1922, Williams became the first player in MLB history to hit 30 home runs and steal 30 bases in a season, which would not be repeated in the major leagues until 1956.

The following year, they crumbled to fifth, partly because Sisler missed the entire season due to sinus problems. At the same time, Ball, already a very hands-on owner, became even more so after Quinn left to buy the Boston Red Sox.

St. Louis Browns primary logo, 1916–1935

Ball confidently predicted that a World Series would be in Sportsman's Park by 1926. In anticipation, he increased the capacity of his ballpark from 18,000 to 30,000. There was a World Series in Sportsman's Park in 1926 – but it was the Cardinals that took part, upsetting the Yankees. Meanwhile, the Browns slumped to seventh in the AL. More importantly, the Cardinals outdrew the Browns by more than 400,000. St. Louis had been considered a "Browns town" until then; as late as 1925, the Browns outdrew the Cardinals by more than 50,000. After their 1926 Series victory, however, the Cardinals dominated St. Louis baseball, while still technically tenants of the Browns. Meanwhile, the Browns rapidly fell into the cellar. They had only two winning records from 1927 to 1943, including a 43–111 mark in 1939 that is still the worst in franchise history. As a measure of how rapidly St. Louisians shifted to the Cardinals, the Browns set a franchise record for attendance in 1922, attracting over 712,000 people. This figure was never approached again for the rest of the franchise's tenure in St. Louis, and remained the franchise record until 1954, the team's first year in Baltimore.

Ball had previously spent lavishly on the Browns, but gradually cut that spending to the bare minimum. He died in 1933, and his estate ran the team for three years, with Ball's former right-hand man Louis Von Weise as team president. The Ball estate mostly left the baseball side to player-manager and former Cardinals great Rogers Hornsby, whom Ball had hired in one of his last acts before his death. However, the Ball estate withheld badly needed capital that could have been used to get better players. Attendance sagged to the point that the other AL teams could not meet their travel expenses. In 1936, Rickey helped broker a sale to investment banker Donald Lee Barnes. Cardinals treasurer Bill DeWitt, Barnes' son-in-law, bought a minority stake in the Browns and became the team's general manager. To help finance the purchase, Barnes sold 20,000 shares of stock to the public at $5 a share, an unusual practice for a sports franchise. Soon afterward, he fired Hornsby after learning he was placing bets on horseraces during games.

== War era ==
By 1941, Barnes was convinced he could never make money in St. Louis. After interests in Los Angeles approached him about buying a stake in the team, he asked AL owners for permission to move there for the 1942 season. Los Angeles was already the fifth-largest city in the United States, larger than any major league city except New York, Chicago, Philadelphia, and Detroit.

The Browns got tentative approval from the league, which went as far as to draw up a schedule accounting for transcontinental train trips, though the Browns suggested that teams could travel by plane, a new concept at the time. Under the deal, the Browns would buy the Chicago Cubs' top affiliate, the Los Angeles Angels; in those days, whoever owned a minor league team owned the major league rights to that city. The deal was slated to receive final approval at a league meeting on December 8.

The deal was disrupted by the Japanese attack on Pearl Harbor, which took place on December 7. Sources differ on how the deal fell apart. According to the Los Angeles Daily News and Los Angeles Times, the AL owners unanimously rejected the proposal after league officials expressed concerns that travel restrictions would be too stringent for a prospective Los Angeles-based team to be viable. However, according to the Society for American Baseball Research, Barnes himself pulled the proposal off the table when he realized that a potential Japanese attack on the West Coast—a concern in the time immediately after Pearl Harbor—would make large-scale events on the West Coast too great of a risk.

During World War II, in 1944, the Browns won their only AL pennant in St. Louis. Due to the draft decimating the minor leagues, Barnes and the Browns pursued a strategy of pursuing players who could not serve in the military. As a result, many of the Browns' best players were classified 4-F (unfit for military service). Years of having to live a hand-to-mouth existence actually served the Browns well during the war years. They were better prepared to adjust to the effects of the draft, while wealthier teams such as the Cardinals were caught off guard when their best players were drafted.

The Browns spent the season in a vigorous three-way race with the Tigers and Yankees for the pennant. On the final day of the season, before a sellout crowd of 35,518—their first sellout since 1924—they defeated the Yankees, 5–2. Minutes earlier, the Tigers had lost, 4–1, to the Washington Senators, giving the Browns the pennant by a single game. They thus became the last of the 16 teams that made up the major leagues from 1903 to 1960 to play in a World Series. By comparison, the other seven AL teams had each won at least three pennants.

In the 1944 World Series, the Browns were decided underdogs against their tenants, the Cardinals. It as the last World Series played entirely in one stadium until the 2020 World Series played in Arlington, Texas. While the Browns lost in six games, they won two of the first three games, and the final three games were very close. Despite losing the Series, Barnes took heart in outdrawing the Cardinals by almost 40,000 fans. It was the only time after 1925 that the Browns outdrew the Cardinals.

The 1945 Browns muddled through much of the early part of the season. In August, though, Barnes abruptly sold his stake in the team to minority owner and refrigeration magnate Richard Muckerman, who retained DeWitt as general manager. While the Browns had the best record in the league from the time Muckerman closed on his purchase, the deficit from earlier in the season was too much to overcome, and they finished in third place with an 81–70 record. Despite fielding less than top-level talent, they were only six games behind the Tigers for first.

The 1945 season may be best remembered for the Browns' signing of utility outfielder Pete Gray, the only one-armed major league position player in history. However, the players felt that Gray was dragging down the team. After Muckerman bought the team, he signed manager Luke Sewell to a two-year contract, and Sewell significantly cut back Gray's playing time. Gray was sent to the minors after the season, and never played in the major leagues again.

Although not apparent at the time, the Browns had crested. They would never have another winning season in St. Louis. Indeed, 1944 and 1945 were two of only six winning seasons they enjoyed in the 31 years after nearly winning the pennant in 1922. They were also two of only seven seasons finishing fourth or better. They would not have another winning record or be a factor in a pennant race until 1960, their seventh year in Baltimore.

Matters were not much better at the gate; 1944 and 1945 were also the only two seasons after 1922 in which the Browns did not have the worst attendance in the AL. Indeed, after 1945, the Browns struggled to attract more than 300,000 in a season.

With the return of peace in 1946, the Browns were outmatched, competing against teams augmented by stars returning from the war, and tumbled to seventh place. In response, Muckerman budgeted $300,000 to renovate Sportsman's Park. The bill swelled to $700,000 when it became apparent that the original plans would not be enough to bring the park up to code. He also built a new stadium for their top farm team, the San Antonio Missions of the Texas League. After a slow start to 1947, he hurriedly signed two Negro league stars, Willard Brown and Hank Thompson. They only lasted a month, when clearly they neither improved attendance nor the team's on-field performance. Only three years after winning the pennant, the Browns posted the worst record in the majors at 59–95.

After the season, Muckerman was forced to sell Vern Stephens, Jack Kramer, and Ellis Kinder, three stars from the 1944 pennant season, to the Red Sox. Years later, DeWitt revealed that between cost overruns from renovations to Sportsman's Park, cost overruns for building the new Mission Stadium in San Antonio, and a marked drop in attendance, the Browns were on the brink of insolvency.

At the same time, prospective buyers began circling the Browns. During the season, Chicago businessman Emory Perry considered buying the Browns and moving them to Los Angeles, but the effort foundered when Perry learned that any major league team moving to California would have to compensate every team in the Pacific Coast League for invading their territory. After the season, Bob Rodenberg, owner of the National Football League's Baltimore Colts, considered buying the Browns and moving them to Baltimore, but this hinged on the Cardinals buying Sportsman's Park, and Rodenberg withdrew his offer when the Cardinals expressed little interest.

After another abysmal season in 1948, in which the Browns struggled to attract crowds over 3,000, Muckerman sold the team to DeWitt and his brother Charley, the team's traveling secretary, mainly because they were the only credible buyers willing to keep the team in St. Louis. They had financed the purchase with notes totaling $1 million that were due in 1954, and the team's attendance numbers over the next two years were quite insufficient to service the debt. Under the circumstances, DeWitt was unable to reverse the slide and was forced to sell any good prospects to the Red Sox or Tigers to pay the bills.

== Veeck era ==
In 1951, Bill Veeck, the former owner of the Cleveland Indians, purchased the Browns from DeWitt, who stayed on as team vice president. In St. Louis, he extended the type of promotions and wild antics that had made him famous and were loved by many and loathed by many others.

His most notorious stunt in St. Louis was held on August 19, 1951, when he ordered manager Zack Taylor to send Eddie Gaedel, a 3-foot 7-inch, 65-pound dwarf, to bat as a pinch hitter. When Gaedel stepped to the plate, he was wearing a Browns child's uniform with the number 1/8. Knowing that Gaedel had no strike zone to speak of, Veeck ordered Gaedel to keep his bat on his shoulder, and Gaedel walked on four straight pitches. The stunt infuriated AL President Will Harridge, who voided Gaedel's contract the next day. Gaedel was by far the shortest person ever to appear in a major league game.

Veeck also promoted another publicity stunt in which the Browns handed out placards – reading "take, swing, bunt", etc. – to fans and allowed them to make managerial decisions for a day. Taylor dutifully surveyed the fans' advice and relayed the sign accordingly. The Browns won the game against the Philadelphia Athletics, whose venerable owner Connie Mack took part in the "Grandstand Managers" voting (against his own team).

After the 1951 season, Veeck made Ned Garver the highest-paid member of the Browns. Garver went on to win 20 games, while the team lost 100 games. He was the second pitcher in history to accomplish the feat. Veeck also brought Satchel Paige back to major league baseball to pitch for the Browns. Veeck had previously signed the former Negro leagues great at age 42 to a contract in Cleveland in 1948, amid much criticism. Paige was 45 when he returned to the mound in a Browns uniform. Veeck was criticized among baseball's owners, but Paige finished the season with a respectable 3–4 record and a 4.79 ERA.

Veeck believed that St. Louis could no longer support two franchises, so planned to drive the Cardinals out of town. He signed many of the Cardinals' most popular ex-players, and as a result, attracted many Cards fans to see the Browns. Notably, Veeck inked former Cardinals great Dizzy Dean to a broadcasting contract and tapped Rogers Hornsby for a second stint as manager. He also reacquired former Browns fan favorite Vern Stephens and signed former Cardinals pitcher Harry Brecheen, both of whom had starred in the all-St. Louis World Series in 1944. Veeck stripped Sportsman's Park of all Cardinals material and dressed it exclusively in Browns memorabilia, even moving his family to an apartment under the stands.

The Browns did not field a winning team during this time. In Veeck's three years as owner, they never finished any closer than 31 games out of first, and twice lost 100 games.

Veeck's all-out assault on the Cardinals came during a downturn in the Cardinals' fortunes after Rickey left them for the Brooklyn Dodgers in 1942. Initially, Veeck appeared to have won the war when Cardinals' owner Fred Saigh was charged with massive tax evasion late in 1952. He pleaded no contest and put the Cardinals up for sale rather than face certain lifetime banishment from baseball. For a time, almost certainly the Cardinals were leaving town, as most of the credible bids came from outside interests. The most promising offer came from a group based in Houston, Texas, where the Cardinals operated a Triple-A farm team. Under the rules of the time, the Cardinals also owned the major league rights to Houston.

Just when the Cardinals appeared to be about to move to Texas, Saigh accepted a somewhat lower bid from St. Louis-based brewery Anheuser-Busch. Saigh had intended all along to sell to any credible buyer who would keep the Cardinals in St. Louis, and he was relieved when brewery president Gussie Busch jumped into the bidding with that in mind. Veeck quickly realized that he was finished in St. Louis. He knew that with Anheuser-Busch's corporate wealth behind them, the Cardinals now had more resources than he could ever hope to match. Unlike most of his fellow team owners, he had no income apart from the Browns. Reluctantly, Veeck concluded he had no other option but to cede St. Louis to the Cardinals and move the Browns elsewhere.

As a first step, he sold Sportsman's Park to the Cardinals for $800,000. He likely would have had to sell it in any event. The 44-year-old park had fallen into disrepair, and even with the rent from the Cardinals, Veeck was not bringing in nearly enough money to bring the park up to par.

Veeck first attempted to move the Browns back to Milwaukee, where he had owned the Triple-A Brewers of the American Association in the 1940s. However, the Brewers were now the top affiliate of the National League's Boston Braves, so had first claim on the major league rights to Milwaukee. Veeck offered to pay Braves owner Lou Perini $700,000 as compensation. Perini stalled on the deal before abruptly moving the Braves there himself in March 1953, three weeks before opening day.

Undaunted, Veeck got in touch with Baltimore Mayor Tommy D'Alesandro and attorney Clarence Miles, who were leading an effort to bring MLB back to Baltimore, a city which had lost its previous team in 1903 after the second incarnation of the Orioles folded and was replaced by the New York Highlanders. He was rebuffed by the other owners, still seething over the publicity stunts he pulled at the Browns home games, and also opposed proposals Veeck had made to pool revenues from broadcasting. The revenue-sharing idea was particularly abhorrent to the Yankees, whose broadcast income dwarfed most other franchises.

Although no official word ever indicated that the 1953 season would be the Browns' last in St. Louis, enough unofficial indications leaked out to erode what support the Browns still had. Attendance fell to 3,860 per game, last in MLB. Under the circumstances, the Browns made a wretched showing, finishing 54–100, 46 games out of first. Not only was Veeck forced to sell off top-drawer players to keep the team afloat, but also late in the season, the Browns were running so low on baseballs that they were forced to ration them during batting practice. When what would be the Browns' last game in St. Louis (a 2–1 loss to the White Sox) went into extra innings, the Browns had so few baseballs on hand that the umpires were forced to recycle the least damaged used ones. Reportedly, the last ball used was gashed from seam to seam.

After the season, Veeck cut a deal with Miles to move the Browns to Baltimore. Under the plan, Veeck would remain as principal owner, but would sell half of his 80% stake to a group of Baltimore investors headed by Miles. Despite assurances from Harridge that approval would be a formality, only four owners voted in favor – two short of passage. Reportedly, Yankees co-owner Del Webb was drumming up support to move the Browns to Los Angeles, where Webb held extensive construction interests. Talk of a Los Angeles move may have been a bluff, though; many owners believed that travel and schedule considerations would make having only one franchise on the West Coast unsustainable.

Veeck, Miles, and D'Alesandro realized that the other AL owners were simply looking for a way to push Veeck out. Over the next 48 hours, Miles lined up enough support from his group of investors to buy out Veeck's entire stake for $2.5 million. Facing threats to cancel the franchise and having sold his only leverage (the renamed Busch Stadium), Veeck had little choice but to take the deal, and the sale was duly approved. While Baltimore brewer Jerold Hoffberger became the largest shareholder, Miles was named president and chairman of the board. His first act was to request permission to move the team to Baltimore, which was swiftly granted. With this, the Browns' 52-year history in St. Louis came to an end.

== Legacy ==
The St. Louis Browns were unique among 1950s baseball teams in that they moved eastward, not westward, and changed their name to make a deliberate break with their history. (Other teams that moved kept their nicknames: Brooklyn/Los Angeles Dodgers, New York/San Francisco Giants, Boston/Milwaukee/Atlanta Braves, and Philadelphia/Kansas City/Oakland Athletics.)

In December 1954, general manager Paul Richards traded 17 players to the New York Yankees, including most former Browns of note still on the Baltimore roster, dramatically changing the team. This remains the biggest trade in baseball history. Though the deal did little to improve the short-term competitiveness of the club, it helped establish a fresh identity for the Orioles franchise. The Orioles make almost no mention of their past as the Browns, but in 2003, when they returned to St. Louis for the first time since they moved, they wore throwback Browns uniforms.

In August 1979, new owner Edward Bennett Williams bought back the shares Barnes had sold to the public in 1936, returning the franchise to private control and removing one of the last remaining links to the Browns era. The buyout price was not published, but given the Orioles' prosperity over their then-25 years in Baltimore, the owners likely made a considerably large return on their investment.

The Browns, like the Washington Senators, were associated mostly with losing. The Senators became the butt of a well-known vaudeville joke, "First in war, first in peace, and last in the American League" (a twist on the famous "Light Horse Harry" Lee eulogy for George Washington: "First in war, first in peace and first in the hearts of his countrymen"). A spin-off joke was coined for the Browns: "First in shoes, first in booze, and last in the American League." (On October 2, 1944, cartoonist Amadee drew the St. Louis Weatherbird in a Browns uniform, standing on its head, with the legend "And first in the American League!")

Societies have been formed to keep the memory of the team alive. The former in-town rival Cardinals have honored George Sisler with a commemorative statue outside Busch Stadium, and generally take up the responsibility for honoring the Browns.

The Browns' Rollie Stiles, 100, died July 22, 2007, in St. Louis County. He was believed to be the oldest former major leaguer at the time, and the last living pitcher to have faced Babe Ruth.

== In popular culture ==
- In the 1944 movie Going My Way, Bing Crosby wears a sweatshirt labeled "St. Louis Browns" and takes the "boys" to see them play. That year, the Browns won the AL pennant but lost the World Series to the Cardinals.
- Skip Battin and Kim Fowley wrote a country rock song called "The St. Louis Browns". The song appears on Battin's 1972 solo album Skip, and as the B-side of his single "Central Park". It was included in the compilation album Baseball's Greatest Hits: Let's Play II.
- The character Ernie "Coach" Pantusso (played by Nicholas Colasanto) on the television sitcom Cheers mentions having played for the Browns.
- In the 1971 novel Fear and Loathing in Las Vegas, author and protagonist Hunter S. Thompson rents a white Cadillac Coupe de Ville and produces an identification card claiming to be "Raoul Duke, leftfielder & batting champion of the St. Louis Browns."
- Jack's grandfather on Three's Company wanted Jack's dad to play for the St. Louis Browns.
