= Richard Muckerman =

American baseball executive

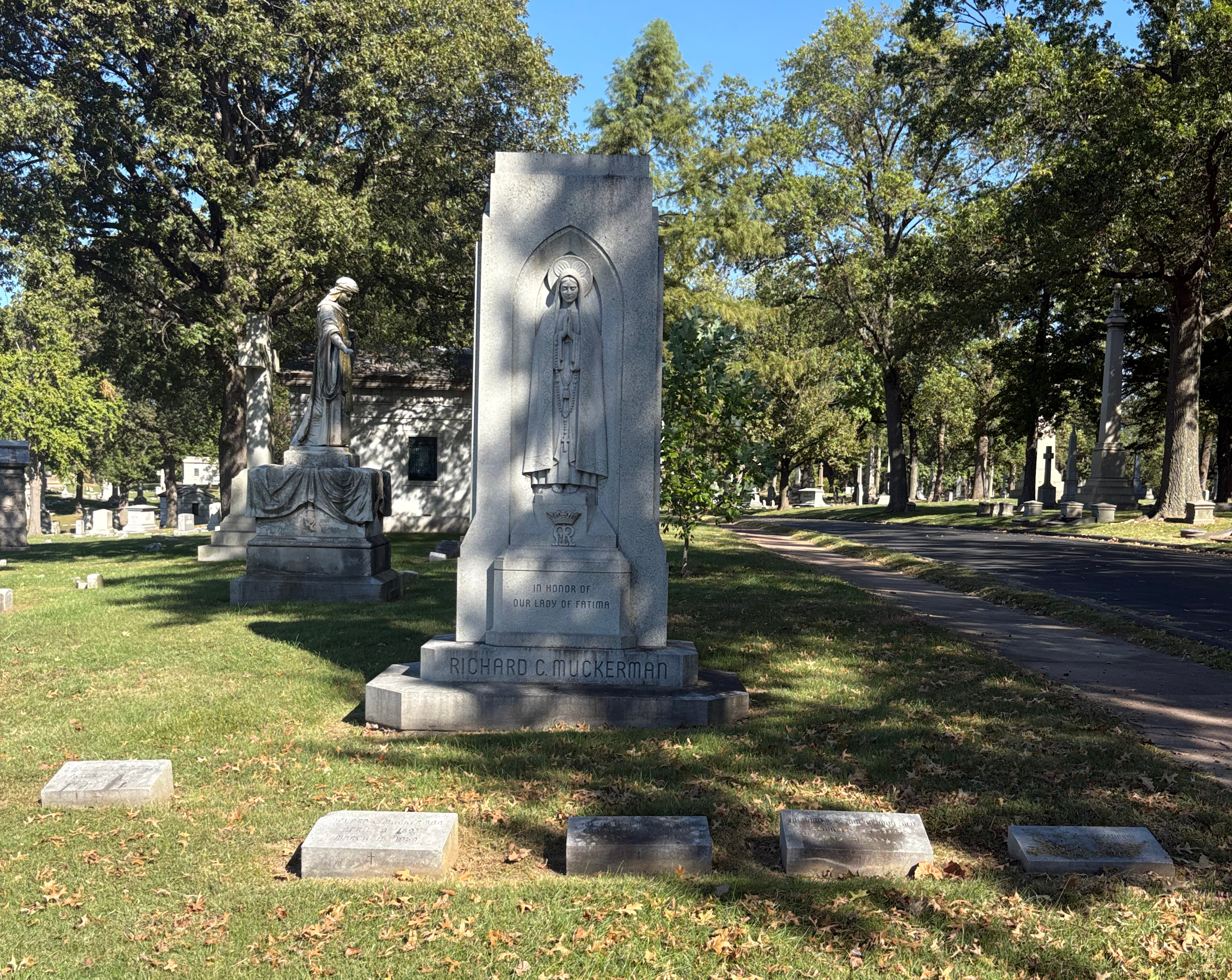
Muckerman's grave at Calvary Cemetery

Richard Muckerman (April 9, 1897 – March 15, 1959) was a 1912 graduate from Western Military Academy in Alton, Illinois. He was the owner of the St. Louis Browns of the American League from 1945 through 1948. A businessman who worked his family's company with the Polar Wave Ice and Fuel Company, he was a minor stockholder of the team since 1939 before being named to the board of directors in 1942. The sale of stock that Muckerman bought also helped the team buy the Toledo Mud Hens of the American Association. He bought the team from Donald Lee Barnes on August 10, 1945, acquiring the 31% that Barnes owned to join with his 25% to make him the first majority owner of the team in decades.

Muckerman believed that the product assembled by DeWitt would be a worthy contender for years, despite the fact that the end of World War II would see richer teams such as the New York Yankees see their stars return ready for play. So confident was Muckerman that he invested over $500,000 in upgrading Sportsman's Park (where both the Browns and Cardinals played) before spending more money to give a new field to the Browns top farm team. After firing Luke Sewell, he hired Muddy Ruel. It was during 1947 that Muckerman, seeing the success of the Brooklyn Dodgers in their integration of baseball with Jackie Robinson, found it prudent to integrate the team as well with black players of his own. As such, Willard Brown and Hank Thompson were signed, an act later called "an act of desperation." The effects on a last place team were negligible, as they remained a last place team; the most notable moment of the season may have been Muckerman bringing in Browns broadcaster Dizzy Dean to pitch the final home game of the year, as Dean had been routinely critiquing the pitching staff and said he could pitch better. The 37-year old suffered a pulled muscle, but over 15,000 fans saw the game, the second highest attendance for a Browns game all year. The financial side was far more troubling. In the offseason, they would sell three players (one being Vern Stephens) to the Boston Red Sox for a combined $375,000, a move that DeWitt said was done because the banks were reportedly preparing to foreclose on Muckerman and his team.

He sold the Browns to Bill DeWitt and Charlie DeWitt after the 1948 season, with the DeWitts receiving help from the American League with a substantial loan. After the sale, Muckerman continued with his business interests (now referred to as the City Ice and Fuel Company) alongside work with churches and local Democratic Party interests. Muckerman died of a heart attack in 1959 and was buried at Calvary Cemetery in St. Louis.
