= Robert Hedges (baseball) =

American baseball executive

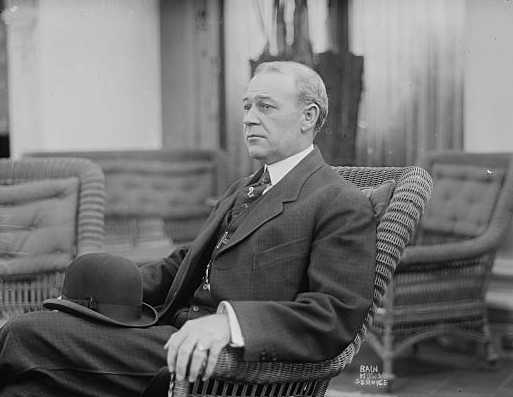

Robert Lee Hedges (born 1869 in Jackson County, Missouri – died April 1932 in St. Louis, Missouri) was the owner of the St. Louis Browns of the American League from 1902 through 1915. Hedges was instrumental in bringing Branch Rickey into the Browns' front office. He sold the Browns to Phil Ball after the 1915 season.

Nicknamed as "Colonel Bob," Hedges is considered to be the first major league owner to view baseball as a purely business venture. Consequently, he invested in innovations that he believed would improve his bottom line by increasing fan attendance (such as through the installation of an electronic scoreboard and the hiring of the first live announcer) or by protecting his assets (such as by taking out life insurance policies on players and developing the first canvas to protect the playing surface from rain).

Actions by Hedges were key to brokering peace between the National League and its rivals. After a bidding war with the American League led to salary inflation, he symbolically returned future Hall of Fame pitcher Christy Mathewson to the New York Giants as part of the settlement to prevent future roster raids. Hedges sold the team to Federal League owner Phil Ball to prevent cannibalization of the St. Louis baseball market, as the presence of three professional teams in the city and the corresponding stiff competition for players caused each franchise to experience financial losses. The $525,000 transaction was completed on 4 January 1916, with Hedges receiving $242,000 for his shares.

Hedges, who grew up on a farm and began his career working as a clerk for Jackson County, became wealthy through the manufacture of carriages. In 1900, with profits soaring, he sold his business, as he had correctly surmised that his industry was greatly threatened by the rise of the automobile.
