= Clarence Miles =

American baseball team administrator

Clarence Miles (June 29, 1897 – October 8, 1977) was the chairman of the board and president of the Baltimore Orioles of the American League during the 1954 and 1955 seasons.

Miles was a native of the Eastern Shore. He had gone to school with Wallis Warfield. In 1924, he founded Miles & Stockbridge, which would become one of Baltimore's more prominent law firms.

In 1952, he joined forces with Mayor Tommy D'Alesandro to bring a major league team to Baltimore. After a year of searching, they found an apparent candidate in the moribund St. Louis Browns. Their owner, Bill Veeck, had recently been broadsided by the sale of the St. Louis Cardinals to Anheuser-Busch. While Veeck had mounted a considerable effort over the prior two years to drive the Cardinals out of St. Louis, he'd concluded he could not possibly compete against a team with Anheuser-Busch's resources behind it and was looking to move elsewhere.

Veeck had wanted to move the Browns to Baltimore himself for the 1953 season, but was voted down. After the season, Veeck cut a deal with Miles and D'Alesandro in which Miles and other Baltimore investors would buy half of Veeck's 80 percent stake in the Browns, with Veeck remaining as principal owner. The proposal required six out of eight owners to vote in favor, but at an owners' meeting in New York City on September 27, only four voted aye, reportedly because Yankees co-owner Del Webb was rounding up support to move the Browns to Los Angeles.

Miles realized that the owners merely wanted Veeck out of the way. In 48 hours, he lined up enough support from several of the Baltimore investors in the original deal with Veeck — such as brewer Jerold Hoffberger, investment banker Joseph Iglehart and real estate developer James Keelty — to buy out Veeck's interest for $2.5 million. This deal, along with the planned move to Baltimore, was unanimously approved. Almost immediately, Miles announced the team would be renamed the Orioles.

With his fellow investors both frustrated with his domination of the team's business operations and dissatisfied with a pair of seventh-place finishes, Miles resigned in early November, 1955. Keelty succeeded him as president with Iglehart becoming board chairman.

== Death ==
Miles died in Queenstown, Maryland, in October 1977.
