= Bill DeWitt =

American sports executive

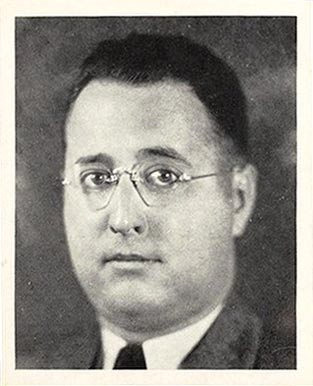
- DeWitt in 1941
- Born: William Orville DeWitt Sr. August 3, 1902; St. Louis, Missouri, U.S.
- Died: March 4, 1982 (aged 79); Cincinnati, Ohio, U.S.
- Occupation: Baseball executive

William Orville DeWitt Sr. (August 3, 1902 — March 4, 1982) was an American professional baseball executive and club owner whose career in Major League Baseball (MLB) spanned more than 60 years. DeWitt held multiple ownership and upper management positions in the major leagues, including general manager and owner of both the St. Louis Browns and Cincinnati Reds, chairman of the board of the Chicago White Sox, and president of the Detroit Tigers.

His son William DeWitt Jr. is currently the principal owner and managing partner of the St. Louis Cardinals, while grandson William III is the Cardinals' president.

== Early life and career ==
DeWitt grew up in St. Louis. One of his first jobs, in 1916, was selling soda pop at the St. Louis Browns' home field, Sportsman's Park, and working as an office boy during his summer vacation. He began his formal baseball career with the Cardinals as a protégé of Branch Rickey, who moved from the Browns to the Redbirds in April 1917 and would become a legendary executive and member of the Baseball Hall of Fame. As a young man, DeWitt studied law at night at Washington University in St. Louis, passed the Missouri Bar exam, and became the first treasurer of the Cardinals.

DeWitt ultimately joined the Browns, the city's underdog American League (AL) team, in November 1936 as minority owner (initially in partnership with majority stockholder Donald Lee Barnes) and general manager.

== St. Louis Browns ==
=== Financial struggles ===
The Browns were cash-strapped and struggling to survive as the second-ranked team in one of the smallest markets in the big leagues, during The Great Depression. The team had drawn only 80,922 fans during the entire 1935 season.

"We operated close to the belt. We had to," DeWitt told author William B. Mead in the 1978 book Even the Browns: Baseball During World War II.

"Once we ran out of cash. Barnes tried to get the board of directors to put up some money. They said, 'No! That's money down the rat hole.' A lot wealthy guys, too ... The Browns had a hell of a time because the Cardinals were so popular and the Browns couldn't do a damned thing. We didn't have any attendance money to build up the ball club with. Most of the clubs had players in the minors that were better than some of the ones we had on the Browns."

The Browns' attendance perked up when they were allowed to play more night home games than other AL teams. Meanwhile, Rickey disciple DeWitt managed to use some of his scant resources to strengthen the Browns' farm system and scouting department, signing and developing Vern Stephens, Al Zarilla, and Jack Kramer—all future major league stars. He also attempted to add depth and unearth hidden talent by trading the Browns' few veteran assets, such as pitcher Bobo Newsom, for second-string players or minor leaguers with other organizations.

Still, the team was nearly moved to Los Angeles after the 1941 season; however, the American League's secret vote on the transfer was scheduled for the week of December 8, and the attack on Pearl Harbor on Sunday, December 7, plunged the U.S. into World War II and saved the Browns for St. Louis for another dozen seasons.

=== 1944 American League pennant ===
In 1944, under DeWitt's leadership as general manager, the Browns captured their only American League pennant. They won only 89 games (losing 65), but outlasted the Detroit Tigers by a single game. They drew as their World Series opponents their formidable tenants at Sportsman's Park, the Cardinals, who had won 105 games to breeze to their third consecutive National League championship. In the all-St. Louis 1944 World Series, the Browns took the opener and Game 3, but then they dropped the final three games to the Redbirds, who were in the process of winning three World Series titles in a five-year span. Nevertheless, DeWitt was named 1944 Major League Executive of the Year by The Sporting News to recognize his achievement.

The Browns' pennant is often downplayed by observers because it occurred during the height of the World War II manpower shortage, when most of the top American League players were in military service. But DeWitt's wartime Browns were one of the more successful teams in the American League, also posting winning campaigns in 1942 and 1945. During their pennant-winning 1944 season, the Browns drew more fans (508,644) than the Cardinals (461,968) for the first time since 1925. In 1945, they employed Pete Gray, an outfielder who, despite having only one arm, had become a capable minor league player. However, in 1946, the first postwar season, the Browns fell back into the second division and never enjoyed another winning campaign in St. Louis. DeWitt was forced to sell Stephens, Kramer and Zarilla—along with pitcher Ellis Kinder, a future 20-game-winner—to the wealthy Boston Red Sox to keep the team solvent.

DeWitt and the Browns also were among the vanguard, albeit only briefly, of MLB teams to break the baseball color line: in 1947, they became the third club to integrate by purchasing the contracts of Hank Thompson and Willard Brown from the Kansas City Monarchs. Thompson made his MLB debut July 17 (only 12 days after Larry Doby of the Cleveland Indians had integrated the American League) and Brown two days later. But the experiment fizzled; the players performed below expectations and encountered resistance from their manager, Muddy Ruel, and some of their white teammates. They were sent back to the Monarchs late in August after only 41 total hits.

DeWitt and his brother Charlie (1900–1967), the Browns' traveling secretary, bought control of the club from majority owner Richard C. Muckerman in February 1949, but the team's struggles on the field and at the box office continued: they lost 101 and 96 games, and drew an average of 259,000 fans a season, in 1949–1950. The DeWitts bought the team with notes totaling $1 million that were due in 1954, and the team's revenues over the next two years did not even begin to service the debt. DeWitt was only able to stay afloat by selling most of the Browns' prospects for cash.

Finally, the DeWitts sold the Browns to Bill Veeck in June 1951. Bill DeWitt remained in the Browns' front office until Veeck was forced to sell the team in September 1953. They then moved to Baltimore to become the modern Orioles franchise in 1954.

== Detroit Tigers ==
DeWitt then served as assistant general manager of the New York Yankees from 1954–1956 and as administrator of the "Professional Baseball Fund" in the office of the Commissioner of Baseball until September 1959, when he became president and de facto general manager of the Detroit Tigers.

=== Brief, but impactful, tenure ===
In his 14 months as the Tigers' president, DeWitt participated in three significant trades with swap-happy Cleveland Indians GM Frank Lane during the 1960 season. Two of the transactions were highly successful, but the third proved controversial.

- On April 12, he swung one of the most successful deals in Tiger history, obtaining first baseman Norm Cash, a future star, for little-used infielder Steve Demeter. Cash would win the 1961 AL batting title, play 15 years in Detroit, make four American League All-Star teams, and smash 373 home runs as a Tiger.
- Then, five days later on April 17, DeWitt traded reigning AL batting champion Harvey Kuenn (who hit .353 in 1959) to the Indians for Rocky Colavito, the reigning 1959 AL home run co-champion (42 homers, tied with Harmon Killebrew), in a one-for-one deal. Colavito played four seasons in Detroit, and continued to hit the long ball, slugging 139 homers (an average of almost 35 per season). Kuenn, meanwhile, spent only one year in Cleveland before being traded to the National League, and never again hit above .308.
- Finally, on August 3, DeWitt and Lane completed the only "trade" of managers in MLB annals, when the Tigers' Jimmy Dykes was exchanged for Cleveland's Joe Gordon.

But Gordon only lasted the final eight weeks of the 1960 campaign, going 26–31 with the Tigers before his resignation on October 3—when he publicly accused DeWitt of "front-office interference." Eighteen days later, on October 21, DeWitt and the Tigers parted company as well, with Gordon's blast still prominent in media coverage. The executive had also drawn criticism for the team's poor 1960 showing, the unpopular redesign of the Tigers' classic "Old English D" home uniform implemented during the season, the firing of coach Billy Hitchcock, and the Veeck-like promotions that DeWitt staged at Briggs Stadium aimed at stimulating attendance. DeWitt left Detroit with two years remaining on his $50,000 per year contract, with principal owner John Fetzer taking over as club president.

== Cincinnati Reds ==
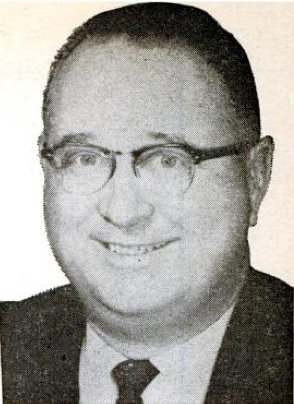
DeWitt in 1962.

=== 1961 National League pennant ===
Less than two weeks after parting ways with the Tigers, on November 2, 1960, DeWitt succeeded Gabe Paul as general manager of the Cincinnati Reds. He made a number of successful deals to acquire players such as Joey Jay (a disappointment with the Milwaukee Braves who became a 20-game winner in Cincinnati), Don Blasingame, Gene Freese and Ken Johnson, and the 1961 Reds went on to post a 93–61 record and capture the 1961 National League (NL) pennant, after they had won just 67 games in 1960. It was Cincinnati's first pennant since its 1940 world championship team.

Owner Powel Crosley Jr. died suddenly before the start of the 1961 season. On March 23, 1962, DeWitt purchased 100 percent ownership of the Reds from the Crosley estate for $4.27 million.

The Reds contended for the first five years of DeWitt's six-season tenure. They fell three games short of repeating in 1962 and one game short of the NL pennant in 1964, a season marred by the terminal illness of their 45-year-old manager, Fred Hutchinson, who was suffering from lung cancer. DeWitt's Reds benefited from a productive farm system, with Jim Maloney, Johnny Edwards, Pete Rose, Tony Pérez, Lee May, and Tommy Helms making their debuts through 1966, and Johnny Bench reaching Triple-A in only his second pro season.

=== Frank Robinson trade ===
During the 1965 campaign, the Reds led the National League in runs scored (825) and run differential (+121), but finished in fourth place, eight games behind the Los Angeles Dodgers, due to an inability to win close games. Sorely in need of mound help, DeWitt controversially traded future Hall of Fame outfielder Frank Robinson to the Orioles for two pitchers and a minor league outfielder; the outrage over the trade made it difficult for one of the pitchers, former Orioles standout Milt Pappas, to adjust to pitching in Cincinnati. The trade later was made famous in the 1988 movie Bull Durham, where Susan Sarandon's character says, "Bad trades are a part of baseball; I mean who can forget Frank Robinson for Milt Pappas, for God's sake?")

After announcing the trade, DeWitt famously defended it by calling Robinson "not a young 30." In his first season with the Orioles, Robinson won the Triple Crown, was unanimously voted the American League Most Valuable Player, and led the Orioles to their first World Series title. Pappas, not yet 27 when the Robinson trade was made, won 28 games in his first two seasons in Cincinnati before being sent to the Atlanta Braves after beginning the 1968 season 2–5. Among the players coming to Cincinnati in that trade would be future bullpen ace Clay Carroll. Another player involved in the Robinson deal was Dick Simpson, a physical specimen and minor league standout who was both fast and powerful, but could not hit major league pitching. In January 1968, Simpson would be traded to the Cardinals in exchange for future AL batting champion Alex Johnson.

The Robinson deal somewhat clouded DeWitt's Cincinnati legacy, although many of the players he had signed or developed became key members of the team's "Big Red Machine" dynasty of the 1970s. On December 5, 1966, he sold the Reds for $8 million to a 13-person syndicate that was led by Francis L. Dale and included Bill DeWitt Jr. One month later, the senior DeWitt was succeeded by Bob Howsam as general manager.

== Late career ==
In 1967, DeWitt's name was briefly linked with an ownership group that unsuccessfully sought an expansion team for Buffalo, New York, as both leagues announced plans to grow from 10 to 12 teams in 1969. DeWitt's last official post in baseball was as chairman and minority owner of the Chicago White Sox from 1975 to 1981, working with the flamboyant Veeck once again.

DeWitt died in Cincinnati, Ohio, on March 4, 1982, at age 79.

Preceded by n/a	St. Louis Browns general manager 1937–1951	Succeeded by Bill Veeck
Preceded by Harvey Hansen	Detroit Tigers president 1959–1960	Succeeded by John Fetzer
Preceded by Rick Ferrell	Detroit Tigers general manager 1959–1960	Succeeded by Rick Ferrell
Preceded by Gabe Paul	Cincinnati Reds general manager 1960–1966	Succeeded by Bob Howsam
