= Donald Lee Barnes =

American baseball executive (1894–1962)

Donald Barnes
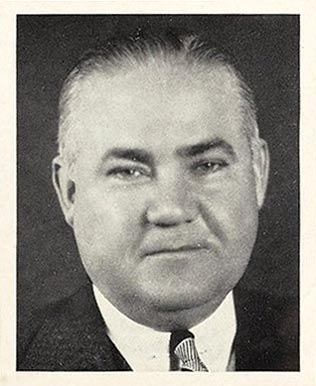
- Barnes in 1941

Personal information
- Born: May 8, 1894
- Died: July 20, 1962 (aged 68) St. Louis, Missouri, U.S.

Sport
- Team: As owner: St. Louis Browns (1936—1944)

Donald Lee Barnes (May 8, 1894 – July 20, 1962) was the owner of the St. Louis Browns of the American League from 1936 through 1944. As a member of American Investment Company and Public Loan Corporation, he originally bought it as head of the syndicate of city sportsmen that bought the team in November 1936 for $325,000.

As quoted by Bill DeWitt, who served as general manager of the Browns for years, "We operated close to the belt. We had to," DeWitt told author William B. Mead in the 1978 book Even the Browns: Baseball During World War II.

"Once we ran out of cash. Barnes tried to get the board of directors to put up some money. They said, 'No! That's money down the rat hole.' A lot wealthy guys, too ... The Browns had a hell of a time because the Cardinals were so popular and the Browns couldn't do a damned thing. We didn't have any attendance money to build up the ball club with. Most of the clubs had players in the minors that were better than some of the ones we had on the Browns."

The Browns attempted to move to Los Angeles in 1941, but the attack on Pearl Harbor, done one day before meetings about relocation, scuttled those plans.

It was in his final full year as owner (1944) when the Browns won the American League pennant, their only one in St. Louis. It was also the only time in his ownership that the Browns outdrew the Cardinals, who both played at Sportsman's Park (the Browns attracted 508,644 fans, the most since 1924 for the team); in fact, it was the only time from 1926 to the final Browns season of 1953 that they outdrew the Cardinals.

The 1945 season saw plenty of turmoil in a disappointing season. Notably, Barnes was responsible for the signing of one-armed outfielder Pete Gray. While Gray was noted in the minors for his batting, it was felt that he was really there as a ploy to drive ticket sales (as a whole, he batted .218 in his only season). Suddenly, Barnes sold the team to Richard Muckerman on August 10. Muckerman was a minor stockholder of the team since 1939 before being named to the board of directors in 1942, with his purchase of stock being related to the move.
