= Shortstop =

Defense position in baseball and softball

The position of the shortstop

Shortstop, abbreviated SS, is the baseball or softball fielding position between second and third base, which is considered to be among the most demanding defensive positions. Historically, the position was assigned to defensive specialists who were typically poor at batting and were often placed at the bottom of the batting order. Today, shortstops are often able to hit well and many are placed at the top of the lineup. In the numbering system used by scorers to record defensive plays, the shortstop is assigned the number 6.

More hit balls go to the shortstop than to any other position, as there are more right-handed hitters in baseball than left-handed hitters, and most hitters have a tendency to pull the ball slightly. Like a second baseman, a shortstop must be agile, for example when performing a 4-6-3 double play. Also, like a third baseman, the shortstop fields balls hit to the left side of the infield, where a strong arm is needed to throw out a batter-runner before they reach the safety of first base.

== Etymology ==
'Shortstop' likely derives from playing closer in than the outfielders, i.e. playing in 'short field' as the position became increasingly an infield position. The term probably also is an adaptation of the defunct cricket position of long stop.

== History ==
Doc Adams of the Knickerbockers created the concept of the shortstop position, according to baseball historian John Thorn and Baseball Hall of Fame researcher Freddy Berowski. In the first five years the Knickerbockers played, the team fielded anywhere from eight to eleven players. The only infielders were the players covering each of the bases; if there were more than eight players, extra outfielders were sometimes used. The outfielders had difficulty throwing baseballs into the infield because of the balls' light weight. Adams's shortstop position, which he started playing at some time from 1849 to 1850, was used to field throws from the outfielders and throw to the three infielders. The position, more of a fourth outfielder than an infielder, was also then called "short fielder" (a term still used in soft-pitch softball for the 10th player).

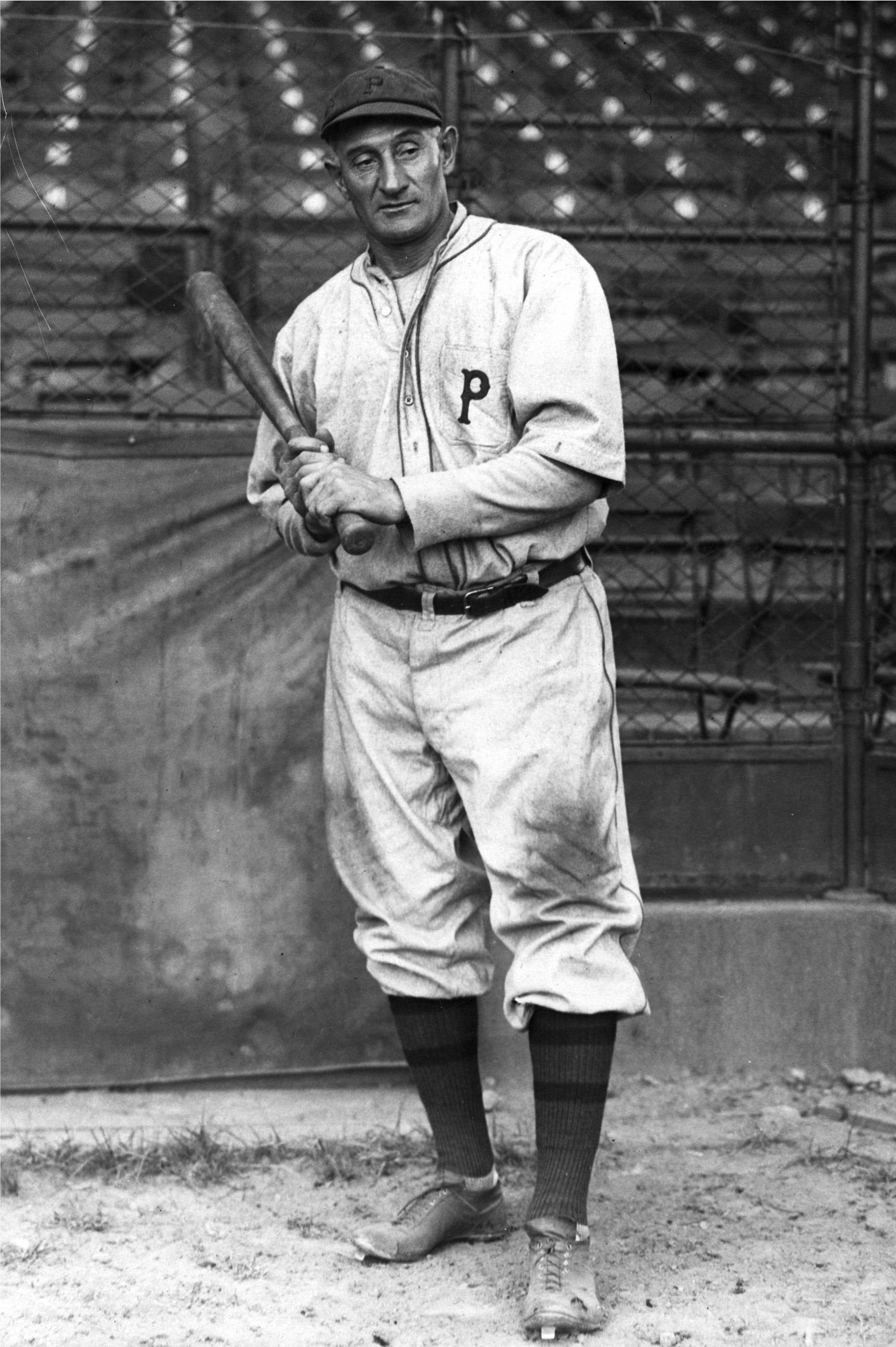
Honus Wagner

With the advent of higher-quality baseballs, Adams moved to the infield, since the distance the balls could travel increased. However, Dickey Pearce, primarily of the Brooklyn Atlantics, is credited as the first to have played the shortstop position as it is played now. Adams had a long playing career with the Knickerbockers: he remained a player with the team until 1860.

== Positioning ==
Unlike the pitcher and catcher, who must start every play in a designated area (the pitcher must be on the pitcher's mound, with one foot in contact with the pitcher's rubber, and the catcher must be behind home plate in the catcher's box) the shortstop and the other fielders can vary their positioning in response to what they anticipate will be the actions of the batter and runner(s) once the play begins.

The shortstop ordinarily is positioned near second base on the third-base side. Because right-handed hitters tend to hit the ball more toward third base, a shortstop will generally move closer to third base if the batter is batting right-handed, and more toward first base if the batter is batting left-handed. A shortstop typically has a strong throwing arm, because he has a relatively long throw to first base, and often has less time in which to make a throw, given that the ground balls he fields have often traveled relatively far. A shortstop must also be extremely agile, because balls hit to or near the shortstop position are usually hit harder than to other infield positions.

Shortstops are required to cover second base in double play situations when the ball is hit to the second baseman or first baseman. They also cover second when a runner is attempting a stolen base, but only when a left-handed hitter is batting because the infield will respond to a left-handed batter by shifting toward first base, resulting in the shortstop being the infielder who is closest to second base. Shortstops also must cover third at various times, including when the third baseman leaves to catch a pop-up or the rotation play; the latter occurs when there are runners on first and second and a sacrifice bunt is attempted toward third base, requiring the third baseman to move in away from third base in order to field it. Shortstops generally are given precedence on catching pop-ups in the infield as well, so they end up calling off other players many times, although on deep pop-ups they generally fall back when called off by an outfielder. They often become the cutoff man on balls to any part of the outfield that are being directed towards third base and all balls to left and center field that are destined for second base. Depending on the system the shortstop may cut balls from left field heading home; however, this is usually the job of the third baseman.

The emphasis on defense makes the position unusually difficult to fill. Historically, a strong shortstop did not have to be a good hitter. Some of the weakest hitters in Major League Baseball have played the position, including Mario Mendoza, for whom George Brett popularized the eponymous Mendoza Line to describe a batting average below .200. Since the 1960s, however, such mediocre hitting has become rarer as teams increasingly demand players with ability to both field and hit.

In practice, a marginal shortstop who hits well can be moved to almost any other position, especially second base or third base, whether early in their careers (examples: George Brett and Mike Schmidt were both tried early in their careers as shortstops) or later due to diminished fielding range, slower reflexes, weaker throwing arms, increased risk of injury, or co-existence with another dominant shortstop, as with Ernie Banks, Cal Ripken Jr., Alex Rodríguez, Michael Young, or Miguel Tejada.

== Significant shortstops ==
=== Shortstops inducted to the Baseball Hall of Fame ===
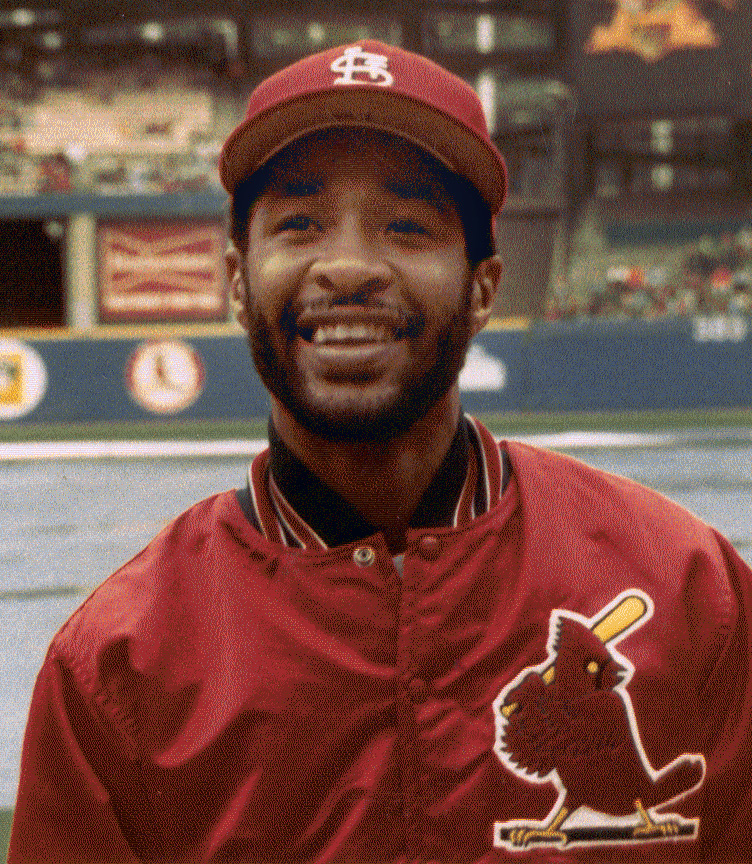
Cardinals great Ozzie Smith

The year in which the player was inducted is given in brackets after his name.

- Luis Aparicio (1984)
- Luke Appling (1964)
- Dave Bancroft (1971)
- Ernie Banks (1977)
- Lou Boudreau (1970)
- Joe Cronin (1956)
- George Davis (1998)
- Travis Jackson (1982)
- Hughie Jennings (1945)
- Derek Jeter (2020)
- Barry Larkin (2012)
- John Henry "Pop" Lloyd (1977)
- Rabbit Maranville (1954)
- Paul Molitor (2004) (Played some games at SS in 1978, 1979, and 1982)
- Pee Wee Reese (1984)
- Cal Ripken Jr. (2007)
- Phil Rizzuto (1994)
- Joe Sewell (1977)
- Ozzie Smith (2002)
- Joe Tinker (1946)
- Alan Trammell (2018)
- Arky Vaughan (1985)
- Honus Wagner (1936)
- Bobby Wallace (1953)
- John Montgomery Ward (1964)
- Willie Wells (1997)
- George Wright (1937)
- Robin Yount (1999)

==== Notes ====
1. John Henry Lloyd and Willie Wells were elected for their play in the Negro leagues.
2. George Wright was elected as a pioneer, but also starred as a shortstop in the 1860s and 1870s.
3. Robin Yount started his career as a shortstop, and moved to the outfield where he played his last nine seasons. (Besides winning the MVP award as a shortstop in 1982, Yount also won the award as a centerfielder in 1989.)
4. Ernie Banks played shortstop for the first half of his career and first base for the remainder.

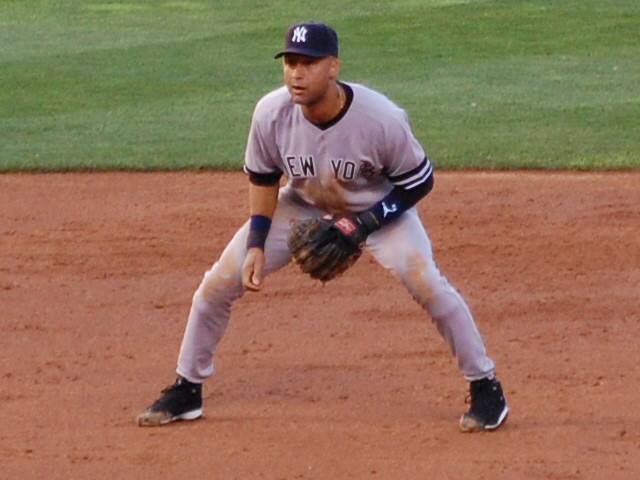
Yankees former shortstop Derek Jeter getting ready to field his position in 2007

=== Multiple Gold Glove Award winners ===
- Ozzie Smith: 13
- Omar Vizquel: 11
- Luis Aparicio: 9
- Mark Belanger: 8
- Dave Concepción: 5
- Derek Jeter: 5
- Tony Fernández: 4
- Jimmy Rollins: 4
- Alan Trammell: 4
- Brandon Crawford: 3
- J. J. Hardy: 3
- Barry Larkin: 3
- Roy McMillan: 3
- Rey Ordóñez: 3
- Andrelton Simmons: 3
- Gene Alley: 2
- Larry Bowa: 2
- Orlando Cabrera: 2
- Don Kessinger: 2
- Francisco Lindor: 2
- Édgar Rentería: 2
- Cal Ripken Jr.: 2
- Alex Rodriguez: 2
- Troy Tulowitzki: 2
- Zoilo Versalles: 2
- Maury Wills: 2

=== All-time single season assist leaders among shortstops ===
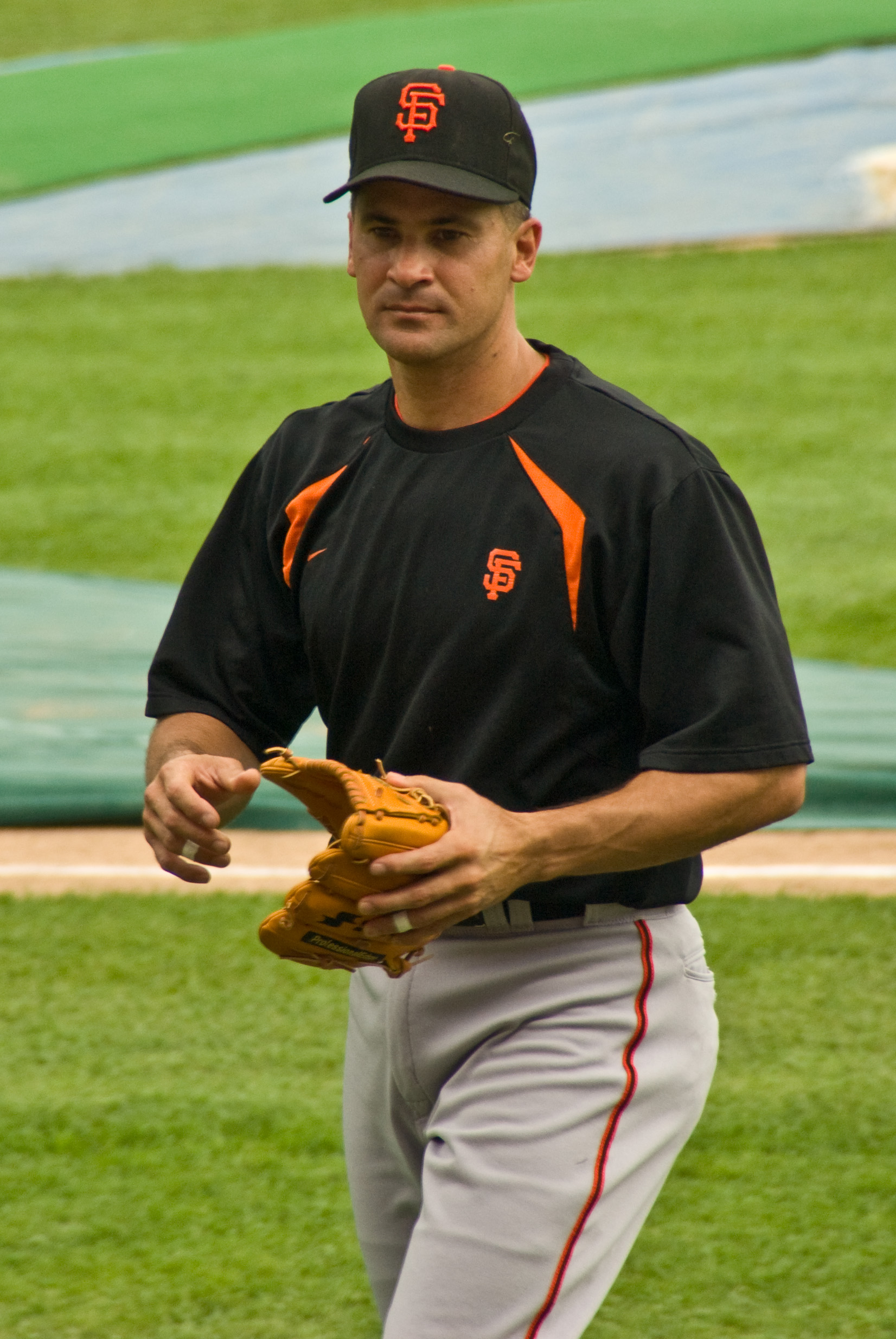
Omar Vizquel played more games at shortstop than any other player in MLB history.

1. Ozzie Smith: 621 (San Diego Padres, 1980)
2. Glenn Wright: 601 (Pittsburgh Pirates, 1924)
3. Dave Bancroft: 598 (Philadelphia Phillies/New York Giants, 1920)
4. Tommy Thevenow: 597 (St. Louis Cardinals, 1926)
5. Iván DeJesús: 595 (Chicago Cubs, 1977)
6. Cal Ripken Jr.: 583 (Baltimore Orioles, 1984)
7. Whitey Wietelmann: 581 (Boston Braves, 1943)
8. Dave Bancroft: 579 (New York Giants, 1922)
9. Rabbit Maranville: 574 (Boston Braves, 1914)
10. Don Kessinger: 573 (Chicago Cubs, 1968)

Source: (does not list teams)

=== All-time single season putout leaders among shortstops ===
1. Donie Bush: 425 (Detroit Tigers, 1914)
2. Hughie Jennings: 425 (Baltimore Orioles [National League], 1895)
3. Joe Cassidy: 408 (Washington Senators, 1905)
4. Rabbit Maranville: 407 (Boston Braves, 1914)
5. Dave Bancroft: 405 (New York Giants, 1922)
6. Eddie Miller: 405 (Boston Braves, 1940)
7. Monte Cross: 404 (Philadelphia Phillies, 1898)
8. Dave Bancroft: 396 (New York Giants, 1921)
9. Mickey Doolan: 395 (Philadelphia Phillies, 1906)
10. Buck Weaver: 392 (Chicago White Sox, 1913)

=== All-time single-season fielding percentage leaders among shortstops ===
1. Mike Bordick: .9982 (Baltimore Orioles, 2002)
2. Cal Ripken Jr.: .9956 (Baltimore Orioles, 1990)
3. Omar Vizquel: .9954 (Cleveland Indians, 2000)
4. Rey Sánchez: .9941 (Kansas City Royals, 2000)
5. Rey Ordóñez: .9938 (New York Mets, 1999)
6. Omar Vizquel: .9933 (San Francisco Giants, 2006)
7. Omar Vizquel: .9931 (Cleveland Indians, 1998)
8. J. J. Hardy: .9923 (Baltimore Orioles, 2012)
9. Tony Fernández .9919 (Toronto Blue Jays, 1989)
10. Rey Sánchez: .9915 (Kansas City Royals, 2001)

=== Number of seasons with 100+ double plays turned at shortstop (among Hall of Fame shortstops) ===
- Cal Ripken Jr.: 12
- Phil Rizzuto: 8
- Lou Boudreau: 6
- Ozzie Smith: 5
- Luke Appling: 4
- Luis Aparicio: 3
- Ernie Banks: 3
- Travis Jackson: 3
- Pee Wee Reese: 2
- Arky Vaughan: 2
- Dave Bancroft: 1
- Joe Cronin: 1
- Derek Jeter: 1
- Rabbit Maranville: 1
- Joe Sewell: 1
- Alan Trammell: 1
- Robin Yount: 1

Source: baseballreference.com

== See also ==
- Gold Glove award winners: List of Gold Glove Award winners at shortstop
- List of Gold Glove middle infield duos
