= Rey Ordóñez =

Cuban baseball player (born 1971)

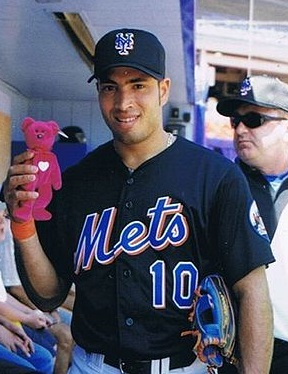
- Ordóñez holding a Beanie Baby with the New York Mets
- Shortstop
- Born: January 11, 1971 (age 55); Havana, Cuba
- Batted: Right Threw: Right

MLB debut
- April 1, 1996, for the New York Mets

Last MLB appearance
- July 19, 2004, for the Chicago Cubs

MLB statistics
- Batting average: .246
- Home runs: 12
- Runs batted in: 287
- Stats at Baseball Reference

Teams
- New York Mets (1996–2002); Tampa Bay Devil Rays (2003); Chicago Cubs (2004)

Career highlights and awards
- 3× Gold Glove Award (1997–1999)

Reynaldo Ordóñez Pereira (born January 11, 1971) is a Cuban former professional baseball shortstop. He played nine seasons in Major League Baseball for the New York Mets, Tampa Bay Devil Rays, and Chicago Cubs.

== Early life ==
Ordóñez was a promising young player for the Havana Industriales club in the Cuban National Series, and was named to the Cuban national team at the 1993 Summer Universiade in Buffalo, New York. He defected to the United States at the tournament, two days after teammate Eddie Oropesa; in doing so, he became only the third player since the Cuban Revolution to openly defect to the United States. In March 2013, Ordóñez finally traveled back to Cuba 20 years after defecting.

== Professional career ==
=== St. Paul Saints ===
Before signing with a major league team, Ordóñez played part of the 1993 season with the St. Paul Saints of the Northern League. In 15 games with the Saints, he batted .283. He signed with the Mets as a free agent after the season, on October 29, 1993.

=== New York Mets ===
Ordóñez joined the Single-A St. Lucie Mets of the Florida State League in 1994 and later that season moved up to Double-A with the Eastern League's Binghamton Mets. He made his major league debut in 1996. Ordóñez won three consecutive Gold Glove Awards for his outstanding defensive play with the Mets from 1997 to 1999. During the 1999 and 2000 seasons, Ordóñez set a major league record for shortstops by playing 101 consecutive games without committing a fielding error. Furthermore, in 1999, Ordóñez committed only four errors while posting a .994 fielding percentage. It is arguably the best defensive single-season performance ever by a major league shortstop based on the number of errors.

Though he rarely struck out and was capable of laying down sacrifice bunts, Ordóñez was not a particularly effective offensive player. Besides a career batting average of .246, he was not a good base stealer, drew few walks and displayed little power. His lifetime OPS of .600 was almost 200 points lower than the major league average (.782 in 2000, for example).

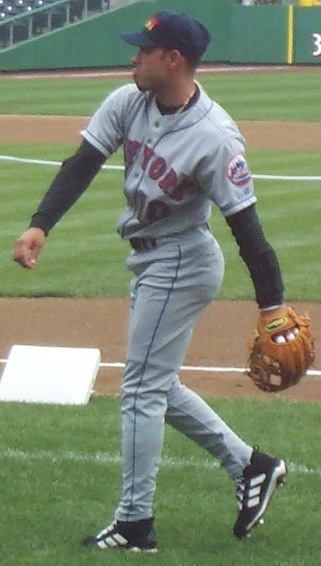
Ordóñez with the New York Mets in 2001

Ordóñez's defensive play never recovered after he fractured his left arm on May 29, 2000, when attempting to tag the Los Angeles Dodgers' F.P. Santangelo out at second base, an injury that prevented the three-time Gold Glove winner from playing in the 2000 World Series (the Subway Series) against the New York Yankees. Given that he offered little offensively, with his defense diminished, his value as a player became drastically reduced. Ordóñez was taunted by unhappy Mets fans throughout the 2002 season, particularly because the much-heralded double play combination of him and Roberto Alomar failed to produce.

=== Devil Rays and Cubs ===
On December 15, 2002, Ordóñez was traded to the Tampa Bay Devil Rays for two minor league players to be named later, along with $4.25 million to cover his salary. Ordóñez missed most of the 2003 season due to injuries and signed with the Chicago Cubs in 2004. He made his Cubs debut in Game 1 of a doubleheader against the Pittsburgh Pirates on May 28. He recorded his first hit in a Cubs uniform on June 2 against the Houston Astros. Ordóñez played 23 games and recorded 10 hits before being given his release by the Cubs on July 23, 2004.

=== San Diego Padres ===
In 2004, incoming rookie Khalil Greene beat out Ordóñez for the position of shortstop with the San Diego Padres during spring training. He was unsure at the time whether he would ever play Major League Baseball again, and did not play for any major league organization during the 2005 and 2006 seasons.

=== Seattle Mariners ===
On November 14, 2006, Ordóñez was signed to a minor league contract by the Seattle Mariners. On April 1, 2007, Ordóñez was reassigned to the Mariners' minor league camp, but stated to the Seattle Times newspaper that at the age of 35, he was "too old for that." According to reports, Ordóñez was originally included on the Mariners' final 25-man roster, but an 11th hour trade with the San Francisco Giants for outfielder Jason Ellison led to his reassignment. Ordóñez hoped to catch on with another major league franchise but never did.

== Personal life ==
In 2001, Ordóñez agreed to pay his ex-wife, Hilda Maria Fiallo, $6,250 per month in child support, for their son, Rey Jr. This amounted to a 4,166 percent raise for Fiallo, who had been previously granted child support payments of only $1.50 per month by a Cuban court.

== See also ==
- List of baseball players who defected from Cuba
- List of Gold Glove Award winners at shortstop
