= 2002 Baseball Hall of Fame balloting =

Elections to the Baseball Hall of Fame

National Baseball

Hall of Fame and Museum
- New inductees: 1
- via BBWAA: 1
- Total inductees: 254
- Induction date: July 28, 2002

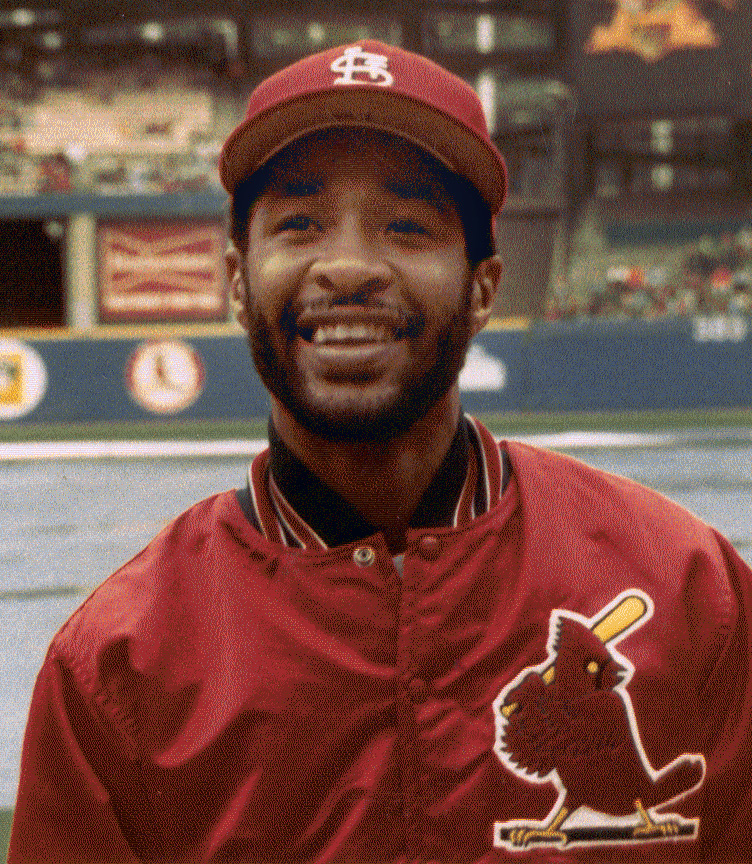
Ozzie Smith, sole 2002 inductee

Elections to the Baseball Hall of Fame for 2002 proceeded in keeping with rules enacted in 2001. The Baseball Writers' Association of America (BBWAA) held an election to select from among recent players; Ozzie Smith was elected.

The Veterans Committee did not hold an election; the 2001 rules changes provided that elections for players retired over 20 years would be held every other year, with elections of non-players (managers, umpires and executives) held every fourth year. The Committee held elections in 2001 for players who were active no later than 1979. The next Veterans Committee election, for both categories, was in 2003.

The induction ceremonies were held on July 28 in Cooperstown, with Commissioner Bud Selig presiding.

== BBWAA election ==
The BBWAA was again authorized to elect players active in 1982 or later, but not after 1996; the ballot included candidates from the 2001 ballot who received at least 5% of the vote but were not elected, along with selected players, chosen by a screening committee, whose last appearance was in 1996. All 10-year members of the BBWAA were eligible to vote.

Voters were instructed to cast votes for up to 10 candidates; any candidate receiving votes on at least 75% of the ballots would be honored with induction to the Hall. Results of the 2002 election by the BBWAA were announced on January 8, 2002. The ballot consisted of 28 players; 472 ballots were cast, with 354 votes required for election. A total of 2810 individual votes were cast, an average of 5.96 per ballot. Those candidates receiving less than 5% of the vote (24 votes) will not appear on future BBWAA ballots, but may eventually be considered by the Veterans Committee.

Candidates who were eligible for the first time are indicated here with a dagger (†). The one candidate who received at least 75% of the vote and was elected is indicated in bold italics; candidates who have since been selected in subsequent elections are indicated in italics. The 8 candidates who received less than 5% of the vote, thus becoming ineligible for future BBWAA consideration, are indicated with an asterisk (*).

Luis Tiant was on the ballot for the 15th and final time.

Player	Votes	Percent	Change	Year
**Ozzie Smith**†	**433**	**91.7**	-	1st
Gary Carter	343	72.7	▲7.8%	5th
Jim Rice	260	55.1	▼2.8%	8th
Bruce Sutter	238	50.4	▲2.8%	9th
Andre Dawson†	214	45.3	-	1st
Goose Gossage	203	43.0	▼1.3%	3rd
Steve Garvey	134	28.4	▼5.8%	10th
Tommy John	127	26.9	▼1.4%	8th
Bert Blyleven	124	26.3	▲2.8%	5th
Jim Kaat	109	23.1	▼3.1%	14th
Jack Morris	97	20.6	▲1.0%	3rd
Don Mattingly	96	20.3	▼7.9%	2nd
Luis Tiant	85	18.0	▲5.8%	15th
Alan Trammell†	74	15.7	-	1st
Dale Murphy	70	14.8	▼3.3%	4th
Dave Parker	66	14.0	▼2.3%	6th
Dave Concepción	56	11.9	▼2.5%	9th
Keith Hernandez	29	6.1	▼1.9%	7th
Ron Guidry*	23	4.9	▼0.3%	9th
Dave Stewart*	23	4.9	▼2.5%	2nd
Mike Greenwell†*	2	0.4	-	1st
Frank Viola†*	2	0.4	-	1st
Lenny Dykstra†*	1	0.2	-	1st
Tim Wallach†*	1	0.2	-	1st
Mike Henneman†*	0	0.0	-	1st
Jeff Russell†*	0	0.0	-	1st
Scott Sanderson†*	0	0.0	-	1st
Robby Thompson†*	0	0.0	-	1st

Key
	Hall of Fame member elected on this ballot (named in **bold italics**).
	Hall of Fame member elected subsequently to 2025 (named in plain italics).
	Renominated for the 2003 BBWAA election by adequate performance on this ballot. Not elected to 2024.
	Eliminated from annual BBWAA consideration by poor performance or expiration on this ballot. Not elected to 2025.
†	First time on the BBWAA ballot.
*	Eliminated from annual BBWAA consideration by poor performance or expiration on this ballot.

The newly-eligible players included twelve All-Stars, one of whom (Steve Howe) was not on the ballot, representing a total of 49 All-Star selections. Among the candidates were 15-time All Star Ozzie Smith, 8-time All Star Andre Dawson, 6-time All-Star Alan Trammell and 5-time All Star Tim Wallach. The field also included two Rookies of the Year (Dawson and Steve Howe), one Cy Young Award winner (Frank Viola) and one MVP (Dawson). Finally, Ozzie Smith holds the record for Gold Gloves at Shortstop, with thirteen.

Players eligible for the first time who were not included on the ballot were: Mike Aldrete, Joe Boever, Chris Bosio, Mark Carreon, Rob Deer, Mark Eichhorn, Félix Fermín, Marvin Freeman, Lee Guetterman, Chris Gwynn, John Habyan, Mel Hall, Steve Howe, Dion James, Mike Kingery, Kirk McCaskill, Roger McDowell, Rich Monteleone, Jeff Parrett, Alejandro Peña, Dick Schofield, Zane Smith, Milt Thompson, and Dave Valle.

== J. G. Taylor Spink Award ==
Joe Falls received the J. G. Taylor Spink Award honoring a baseball writer. (The award was voted at the December 2001 meeting of the BBWAA, dated 2001, and conferred in the summer 2002 ceremonies.)

== Ford C. Frick Award ==
Harry Kalas received the Ford C. Frick Award honoring a baseball broadcaster.
