= Ozzie Smith =

American professional baseball player (born 1954)

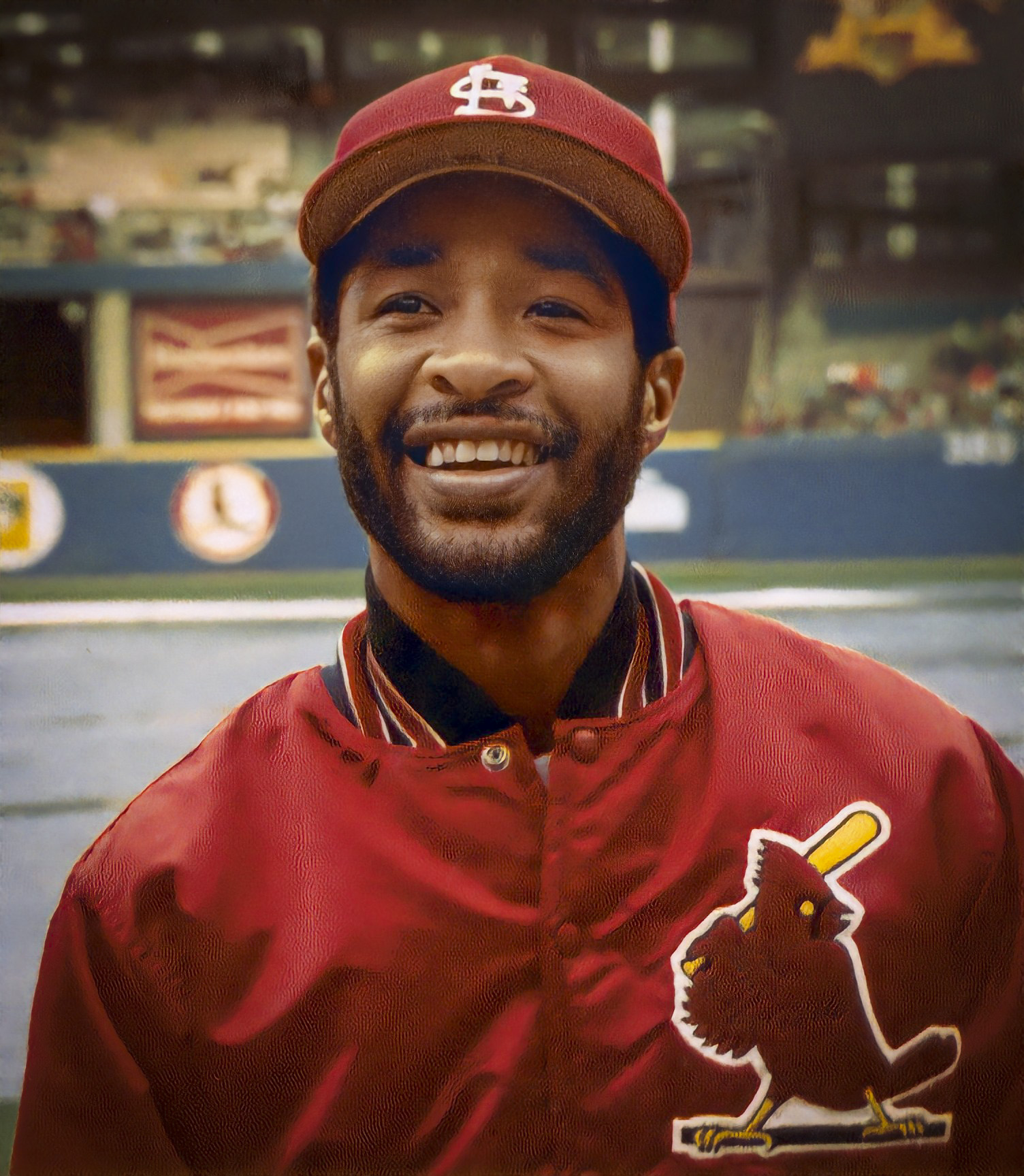
- Smith with the St. Louis Cardinals in 1983
- Shortstop
- Born: December 26, 1954 (age 71); Mobile, Alabama, U.S.
- Batted: Switch Threw: Right

MLB debut
- April 7, 1978, for the San Diego Padres

Last MLB appearance
- September 29, 1996, for the St. Louis Cardinals

MLB statistics
- Batting average: .262
- Hits: 2,460
- Home runs: 28
- Runs batted in: 793
- Stolen bases: 580
- Stats at Baseball Reference

Teams
- San Diego Padres (1978–1981); St. Louis Cardinals (1982–1996)

Career highlights and awards
- 15× All-Star (1981–1992, 1994–1996); World Series champion (1982); NLCS MVP (1985); 13× Gold Glove Award (1980–1992); Silver Slugger Award (1987); Roberto Clemente Award (1995); St. Louis Cardinals No. 1 retired; St. Louis Cardinals Hall of Fame

Member of the National

Baseball Hall of Fame
- Induction: 2002
- Vote: 91.7% (first ballot)

Osborne Earl Smith (born December 26, 1954) is an American former professional baseball player. Nicknamed "the Wizard of Oz", Smith played shortstop for the San Diego Padres and St. Louis Cardinals in Major League Baseball (MLB). Renowned for his acrobatic athletic ability, Smith is now widely regarded as one of the greatest defensive players of all time, winning the National League (NL) Gold Glove Award for defensive play at shortstop for 13 consecutive seasons. He was also a 15-time All-Star, accumulated 2,460 hits and 580 stolen bases during his career, and won the National League Silver Slugger Award as the best hitter at shortstop in 1987.

Smith was born in Mobile, Alabama; his family moved to Watts, Los Angeles, when he was six years old. While participating in childhood athletic activities, Smith possessed quick reflexes; he went on to play baseball at Locke High School in Los Angeles, then at California Polytechnic State University, San Luis Obispo. Drafted as an amateur player by the Padres, Smith made his major league debut in 1978. He quickly established himself as an outstanding fielder, and later became known for performing backflips on special occasions while taking his position at the beginning of a game. Smith won his first Gold Glove Award in 1980 and made his first All-Star Game appearance in 1981.

When Smith clashed with the Padres' owners, Cardinals manager Whitey Herzog flew to San Diego to persuade the shortstop that he would be an appreciated and core component of the St. Louis team. Herzog's overture worked; Smith waived his contract's no-trade clause and was traded to the Cardinals for shortstop Garry Templeton in 1982. Upon joining the Cardinals, Smith helped the team win the 1982 World Series. Three years later, his game-winning home run during Game 5 of the 1985 National League Championship Series prompted broadcaster Jack Buck's "Go crazy, folks!" play-by-play call. Despite a rotator cuff injury during the 1985 season, Smith posted career highs in multiple offensive categories in 1987. Smith continued to earn Gold Gloves and All-Star appearances annually until 1993. During the 1995 season, Smith had shoulder surgery and was out nearly three months. After tension with his new manager Tony La Russa developed in 1996, Smith retired at season's end, and his uniform number (No. 1) was subsequently retired by the Cardinals. Smith served as host of the television show This Week in Baseball from 1997 to 1998.

Smith was elected to the Baseball Hall of Fame in his first year of eligibility in 2002. He was also elected to the St. Louis Cardinals Hall of Fame in the inaugural class of 2014.

== Early life ==
Smith was born in Mobile, Alabama, the second of Clovi and Marvella Smith's six children (five boys and one girl). His father worked as a sandblaster at Brookley Air Force Base. When Smith was six, his family moved to the Watts section of Los Angeles. His father became a delivery truck driver for Safeway stores, while his mother became an aide at a nursing home. His mother was an influential part of his life who stressed the importance of education and encouraged him to pursue his dreams.

Smith played a variety of sports in his youth, though considered baseball to be his favorite. He developed quick reflexes through various athletic and leisure activities, such as bouncing a ball off the concrete steps in front of his house, moving in closer to reduce reaction time with each throw. When not at the local YMCA or playing sports, Smith sometimes went with friends to the neighborhood lumberyard, springboarding off inner tubes and doing flips into sawdust piles (a precursor to his famous backflips). In 1965, at age 10, he endured the Watts Riots with his family, recalling, "We had to sleep on the floor because of all the sniping and looting going on."

While Smith was attending junior high school, his parents divorced. Continuing to pursue his interest in baseball, he would ride the bus for nearly an hour to reach Dodger Stadium, cheering for the Los Angeles Dodgers at about 25 games a year. Upon becoming a student at Locke High School, Smith played on the basketball and baseball teams. Smith was a teammate of future National Basketball Association player Marques Johnson on the basketball team, and a teammate of future fellow Hall-of-Fame player Eddie Murray on the baseball side. After high school, Smith attended Cal Poly San Luis Obispo in 1974 on a partial academic scholarship, and managed to walk on to the baseball team. He learned to switch-hit from Cal Poly coach Berdy Harr. When Cal Poly's starting shortstop broke his leg midway through the 1974 season, Smith took over the starting role. He was named an All-American athlete and established school records in career at-bats (754) and stolen bases (110) before graduating in 1977.

== Professional baseball career ==
=== San Diego Padres (1978–1981) ===
Smith was playing semi-professional baseball in Clarinda, Iowa, when in June 1976 he was selected in the seventh round of the amateur entry draft by the Detroit Tigers. The parties could not agree on a contract; Smith wanted a $10,000 ($56,579 today) signing bonus, while the Tigers offered $8,500 ($48,092 today). Smith returned to Cal Poly for his senior year, then in the 1977 draft was selected in the fourth round by the San Diego Padres, ultimately agreeing to a contract that included a $5,000 signing bonus ($26,565 today). Smith spent his first year of professional baseball during 1977 with the Class A Walla Walla Padres of the Northwest League.

"As I was in the air, the ball took a bad hop and caromed behind me, but I was able to catch it with my bare hand. I hit the ground, bounced back up, and threw Burroughs out at first."

— Ozzie Smith describes a fielding play he made in 1978

Smith began 1978 as a non-roster invitee to the San Diego Padres' spring training camp in Yuma, Arizona. Smith credited Padres manager Alvin Dark for giving him confidence by telling reporters the shortstop job was Smith's until he proved he can't handle it. Even though Dark was fired in the middle of training camp, Smith made his Major League Baseball (MLB) debut on April 7, 1978.

It did not take long for Smith to earn recognition in the major leagues, making what some consider his greatest fielding play only 10 games into his rookie season. The Padres played host to the Atlanta Braves on April 20, 1978, and with two out in the top of the fourth inning, Atlanta's Jeff Burroughs hit a ground ball up the middle. Smith described the play by saying, "He hit a ball back up the middle that everybody thought was going into center field. I instinctively broke to my left and dove behind second. As I was in the air, the ball took a bad hop and caromed behind me, but I was able to catch it with my bare hand. I hit the ground, bounced back up, and threw Burroughs out at first."

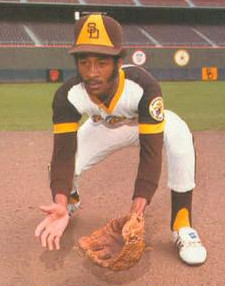
Smith in 1978

During a roadtrip to Houston, later in the season, Smith met a part-time usherette at the Astrodome named Denise while making his way to the team bus outside the stadium. The couple developed a relationship that was sometimes long-distance in nature, and eventually decided to marry. It was also during the 1978 season where Smith introduced a signature move. Padres promotion director Andy Strasberg knew Smith could perform backflips, though only did them during practice before fans entered the stadium. Strasberg asked Smith to do a backflip for fans during Fan Appreciation Day on October 1, the Padres' last home game of the season. After conferring with veteran teammate Gene Tenace, Smith went ahead with the backflip, and it proved to be wildly popular. Smith finished the 1978 season with a .258 batting average and .970 fielding percentage, placing him second in the National League Rookie of the Year voting to Bob Horner.

After working with a hitting instructor during the offseason, Smith failed to record a base hit in his first 32 at-bats of the 1979 season. Among players with enough at-bats to qualify for the 1979 National League Triple Crown, Smith finished the season last in batting average (.211), home runs (0), and RBI (27). Off the field, conflict developed between Padres' ownership and the combination of Smith and his agent, Ed Gottlieb. The parties entered into a contract dispute before the 1980 season, and when negotiations lasted into spring training, the Padres renewed Smith's contract at his 1979 salary of $72,500 Smith's agent told the Padres the shortstop would forgo the season to race in the Tour de France, despite the fact Smith admitted to The Break Room on 96.5 WCMF in Rochester, New York, he had never heard of the Tour. Angered by the Padres' attitude during those contract talks, Gottlieb took out a help-wanted ad in the San Diego Union, part of which read, "Padre baseball player wants part-time employment to supplement income." When Joan Kroc, wife of Padres owner Ray Kroc, publicly offered Smith a job as an assistant gardener on her estate, Smith and Gottlieb's relationship with the organization deteriorated further.

Meanwhile, Smith was winning recognition for his accomplishments on the field. In 1980, he set the single-season record for most assists by a shortstop (621), and began his string of 13 consecutive Gold Glove awards. Smith's fielding play prompted the Yuma Daily Sun to use the nickname "the Wizard of Oz" in a March 1981 feature article about Smith. While "the Wizard of Oz" nickname was an allusion to the 1939 motion picture of the same name, Smith also came to be known as simply "the Wizard" during his playing career, as Smith's Baseball Hall of Fame plaque would later attest. In 1981, Smith made his first All-Star Game appearance as a reserve player.

==== Trade ====
While Smith was having problems with the Padres' owners, the St. Louis Cardinals also found themselves unhappy with their shortstop, Garry Templeton. Templeton's relationship with Cardinal Nation had become increasingly strained and finally came to a head during a game at Busch Stadium on August 26, 1981, when (after being heckled for not running out a ground ball) he made obscene gestures at fans, and had to be physically pulled off the field by manager Whitey Herzog.

Given the task of overhauling the Cardinals by owner Gussie Busch (and specifically to unload Templeton), Herzog was looking to trade Templeton when he was approached by Padres General Manager Jack McKeon at the 1981 baseball winter meetings. While McKeon had previously told Herzog that Smith was untouchable in any trade, the Padres were now so angry at Smith's agent Gottlieb that McKeon was willing to deal. McKeon and Herzog agreed in principle to a six-player trade, with Templeton for Smith as the centerpiece. It was then that Padres manager Dick Williams informed Herzog a no-trade clause had been included in Smith's 1981 contract. Upon learning of the trade, Smith's initial reaction was to invoke the clause and stay in San Diego, but he was still interested to hear what the Cardinals had to say. While the deal for the players beside Templeton and Smith went through, Herzog flew to San Diego to meet with Smith and Gottlieb over the Christmas holiday. Smith later recalled that, "Whitey told me that with me playing shortstop for the St. Louis Cardinals, we could win the pennant. He made me feel wanted, which was a feeling I was quickly losing from the Padres. The mere fact that Whitey would come all the way out there to talk to us was more than enough to convince me that St. Louis was the place I wanted to be."

=== St. Louis Cardinals (1982–1996) ===
==== 1982–1984 ====
On December 10, 1981, the Padres traded Smith, Steve Mura, and a player to be named later to the Cardinals for Templeton, Sixto Lezcano and a player to be named later. The teams completed the trade on February 19, 1982, with the Padres sending Al Olmsted to the Cardinals, and St. Louis sending Luis DeLeon to the Padres. Herzog believed Smith could improve his offensive production by hitting more ground balls, and subsequently created a motivational tool designed to help Smith concentrate on that task. Approaching Smith one day during spring training, Herzog said, "Every time you hit a fly ball, you owe me a buck. Every time you hit a ground ball, I owe you a buck. We'll keep that going all year." Smith agreed to the wager, and by the end of the season had won close to $300 from Herzog. As the 1982 season got underway, Herzog's newly assembled team won 12 games in a row during the month of April, and finished the season atop the National League East division. Herzog would later say of Smith's contributions: "If he saved two runs a game on defense, which he did many a night, it seemed to me that was just as valuable to the team as a player who drove in two runs a game on offense."

Smith became a father during the 1982 season with the birth of his son O.J., today known as Nikko, on April 28. Smith also developed a lasting friendship with teammate Willie McGee during the season, and Smith said he likes to think he "helped Willie get over some of the rough spots of adjusting to the major leagues". Smith later participated in the postseason for the first time when the Cardinals faced the Atlanta Braves in the best-of-five 1982 National League Championship Series (NLCS). In Game 1, Smith drove in the series' first run by hitting a sacrifice fly that scored McGee, ultimately going five for nine in St. Louis' three-game series sweep.

Just as Herzog had predicted in December, Smith found himself as the team's starting shortstop in the best-of-seven 1982 World Series against the Milwaukee Brewers. During the series, Smith scored three runs, had five hits, and did not commit an error in the field. When St. Louis was trailing 3–1 with one out in the sixth inning of Game 7, Smith started a rally with a base hit to left field, eventually scoring the first of the team's three runs that inning. The Cardinals scored two more runs in the 8th inning for a 6–3 win and the championship.

In January 1983, Smith and the Cardinals agreed on a new contract that paid Smith $1 million per year.

During the 1983 season, Smith was voted the National League's starting shortstop in the All-Star Game for the first time in 1983, and at season's end won a fourth consecutive Gold Glove Award.

In July 1984, Smith's wrist was broken by a pitch as he batted against the Padres. He returned from the disabled list after a month, but his return to the lineup was not enough to propel the Cardinals to a postseason berth.

==== 1985–1986 ====
"Smith corks one into right, down the line! It may go ... Go crazy, folks, go crazy! It's a home run, and the Cardinals have won the game, by the score of 3 to 2, on a home run by the Wizard! Go crazy!"

— Jack Buck

"And that's driven to deep right field, back goes Marshall ... gone!

— NBC's Vin Scully

In 1985, Smith amassed a .276 batting average, 31 stolen bases, and 591 assists in the field. The Cardinals as a team won 101 games during the season and earned another postseason berth. Facing the Los Angeles Dodgers in the now best-of-seven NLCS, a split of the first four games set the stage for Game 5 at Busch Stadium. With the score tied at two runs apiece in the bottom of the ninth inning, Dodgers manager Tommy Lasorda called upon closer Tom Niedenfuer to pitch. Smith batted left-handed against Niedenfuer with one out. Smith, who had never hit a home run in his previous 2,967 left-handed major league at-bats, pulled an inside fastball down the right-field line for a walk-off home run, ending Game 5 in a 3–2 Cardinals victory. Smith said, "I was trying to get an extra-base hit and get into scoring position. Fortunately, I was able to get the ball up." The home run not only prompted broadcaster Jack Buck's "Go crazy folks" play-by-play call, but was also later voted the greatest moment in Busch Stadium history by Cardinals fans.

After Smith's teammate Jack Clark hit a late-inning home run of his own in Game 6 to defeat the Dodgers, the Cardinals moved on to face the Kansas City Royals in the 1985 World Series. Once again sportswriters were quick to draw attention to Smith's outstanding defensive play instead of his 2 for 23 effort at the plate. After the Cardinals took a three-games-to-two advantage, a controversial Game 6 call by umpire Don Denkinger overshadowed the remainder of the Series (which the Royals won in seven games).

What was not publicly known during the regular season and playoffs was that Smith had torn his rotator cuff after suffering an impingement in his right shoulder during the July 11–14 homestand against the Padres. After suffering the impingement diving back into first base on a pickoff throw, Smith altered his throwing motion to such a degree that the rotator cuff tear subsequently developed. The 5-foot-10-inch (1.78 m), 180-pound (82 kg) Smith opted to forgo surgery and instead built up his arm strength via weightlifting, playing through whatever pain he encountered. Said Smith, "I didn't tell anybody about the injury, because I wanted to keep playing and didn't want anybody thinking they could run on me or take advantage of the injury. I tried to do almost everything, except throw a baseball, left-handed: opening a door, turning on the radio—everything. It didn't get any better, but it was good enough that I didn't have to have surgery."

Because of his injury, Smith let his then four-year-old son Nikko perform his traditional Opening Day backflip before the Cardinals' first home game of the 1986 season. Smith made an "eye-popping" play later that season on August 4, during a game against the Philadelphia Phillies at Busch Stadium. In the top of the ninth inning, Phillies pinch-hitter Von Hayes hit a short fly ball to left field, which was pursued by both Smith and left fielder Curt Ford. Running with his back to home plate, Smith dove forward, simultaneously catching the ball while parallel to the ground and flying over the diving Ford, avoiding a collision by inches.

==== 1987–1990 ====
"The thing about Ozzie is, if he misses a ball, you assume it's uncatchable. If any other shortstop misses a ball, your first thought is, 'Would Ozzie have had it?'"

— Former New York Mets shortstop Bud Harrelson in 1987

After hitting in either the second or eighth spot in the batting order for most of his time in St. Louis, Herzog made Smith the number-two hitter full-time during the 1987 season. Over the course of the year, Smith accrued a .303 batting average, 43 stolen bases, 75 RBIs, 104 runs scored, and 40 doubles, good enough to earn him the Silver Slugger Award at shortstop. In addition to winning the Gold Glove Award at shortstop for the eighth consecutive time, Smith posted a career-high on-base percentage of .392. Smith was also the leading vote-getter in the 1987 All-Star Game. The Cardinals earned a postseason berth with 95 wins, and subsequently faced the San Francisco Giants in the 1987 National League Championship Series. Smith contributed a triple during the series, and the Cardinals won the contest in seven games.

The 1987 World Series matched the Cardinals against the American League champion Minnesota Twins. The home team won every game of the contest, as Minnesota won the series. In 28 at-bats during the Series, Smith scored three runs and had two RBIs. Smith finished second in MVP balloting to Andre Dawson, who had played on the last-place Chicago Cubs, largely because Smith and teammate Jack Clark split the first-place vote. Following the 1987 season, Smith was awarded the largest contract in the National League at $2.34 million.

While the team did not see the postseason for the remainder of the decade, Smith continued to rack up All-Star appearances and Gold Gloves. Combined with the attention he received from his contract, Smith continued to be a national figure. Known as a savvy dresser, he made the April 1988 cover of GQ magazine. Smith was witness to change within the Cardinal organization when owner Gussie Busch died in 1989 and Herzog quit as manager during the 1990 season.

==== 1990–1995 ====
"No one paid attention to my offense. So having 2,000 hits is one of the things that is an accomplishment."

— Ozzie Smith, from the 1993 St. Louis Cardinals Yearbook

Joe Torre became Smith's new manager in 1990, but the team did not reach the postseason during Torre's nearly five-year tenure. While the Cardinals celebrated their 100th anniversary in 1992, Smith marked milestones of his own, stealing his 500th career base on April 26, then notching a triple on May 26 in front of the home crowd for his 2,000th hit. St. Louis had a one-game lead in the National League East division on June 1, 1992, but injuries took their toll on the team, including Smith's two-week illness in late July after contracting chicken pox for the first time. As a testament to his national visibility during this time, Smith appeared in a 1992 episode of The Simpsons titled "Homer at the Bat". Smith became a free agent for the first time in his career on November 2, 1992, only to re-sign with the Cardinals on December 6.

Smith won his final Gold Glove in 1992, and his 13 consecutive Gold Gloves at shortstop in the National League has yet to be matched. The 1993 season marked the only time between 1981 and 1996 where Smith failed to make the All-Star team, and Smith finished the 1993 season with a .288 batting average and .974 fielding percentage. He appeared in 98 games during the strike-shortened 1994 season, and later missed nearly three months of the 1995 season after shoulder surgery on May 31. Smith was recognized for his community service efforts with the 1994 Branch Rickey Award and the 1995 Roberto Clemente Award. In February 1994, Smith took on the role of honorary chairman and official spokesman for the Missouri Governor's Council on Physical Fitness and Health.

==== 1996 ====
As Smith entered the 1996 season, he finalized a divorce from his wife Denise during the first half of the year. Meanwhile, manager Tony La Russa began his first season with the Cardinals in tandem with a new ownership group. After General Manager Walt Jocketty acquired shortstop Royce Clayton during the offseason, La Russa emphasized an open competition for the spot that would give the Cardinals the best chance to win. When spring training concluded, Smith had amassed a .288 batting average and zero errors in the field, and Clayton batted .190 with eight errors. Smith believed he had earned the position with his spring training performance, but La Russa disagreed, and awarded Clayton the majority of playing time in the platoon situation that developed, where Smith typically saw action every third game. La Russa said,

I think it's fair to say he misunderstood how he compared to Royce in spring training ... When I and the coaches evaluated the play in spring training—the whole game—Royce started very slowly offensively and you could see him start to get better. By what he was able to do defensively and on the bases, Royce deserved to play the majority of the games.

Smith missed the first month of the season with a hamstring injury, and continued to harbor ill feelings toward La Russa that had developed after spring training ended. In a closed-door meeting in mid-May, La Russa asked Smith if he would like to be traded. Instead, Smith and his agent negotiated a compromise with Cardinals management, agreeing to a buyout of special provisions in his contract in conjunction with Smith announcing his retirement. The agreement prompted a press conference at Busch Stadium on June 19, 1996, during which Smith announced he would retire from baseball at season's end.

Ozzie Smith's number 1 was retired by the St. Louis Cardinals in 1996.

As Smith made his final tour of the National League, he was honored by many teams, and received a standing ovation at the 1996 All-Star Game in Philadelphia. Between June 19 and September 1, Smith's batting average increased from .239 to .286. On September 2 Smith tied a career high by scoring four runs, one of which was a home run, and another on a close play at home plate in the bottom of the 10th inning against division leader Houston. The victory moved the Cardinals to within a half game of Houston in the National League Central Division, and the Cardinals went on to win the division by six games. The Cardinals held a special ceremony at Busch Stadium on September 28, 1996, before a game against the Cincinnati Reds, honoring Smith by retiring his uniform number. Noted for his ritual backflip before Opening Days, All-Star Games, and postseason games, Smith chose this occasion to perform it for one of the last times.

In the postseason, the Cardinals first faced the San Diego Padres in the 1996 National League Division Series. After sitting out Game 1, Smith got the start in Game 2 at Busch Stadium, helping his team go up two games in the series by notching a run, a hit and two walks at the plate, along with an assist and a putout in the field. The Cardinals then swept the series by winning Game 3 in San Diego.

The Cardinals faced the Atlanta Braves in the 1996 National League Championship Series. Smith started Game 1 and subsequently registered three putouts and one assist in the field, but went hitless in four at-bats in the Cardinals' 4–2 loss. The Cardinals then won Games 2, 3, and 4, contests in which Smith did not appear. Upon receiving the start in Game 5, Smith nearly duplicated his Game 1 performance with four putouts, one assist, and no hits in four at-bats as part of another Cardinals defeat. The Cardinals also failed to win Game 6 or Game 7 in Atlanta, ending their season. When the Cardinals were trailing by 10 runs during Game 7 on October 17, Smith flied out to right field while pinch-hitting in the sixth inning, marking the end of his playing career.

Smith finished his career with distinctions ranging from the accumulation of more than 27.5 million votes in All-Star balloting, to holding the record for the most MLB at-bats without hitting a grand slam.

== Post-playing career ==
Upon retirement, Smith took over from Mel Allen as the host of the television series This Week in Baseball (TWIB) in 1997. Smith also became color commentator for the local broadcast of Cardinals games on KPLR-TV from 1997 to 1999. When his stint on This Week in Baseball concluded, Smith then moved on to do work for CNN-SI beginning in 1999. After La Russa retired as manager of the Cardinals in 2011, Smith became active in the organization again, starting with his stint as a special instructor for the team's 2012 spring training camp.

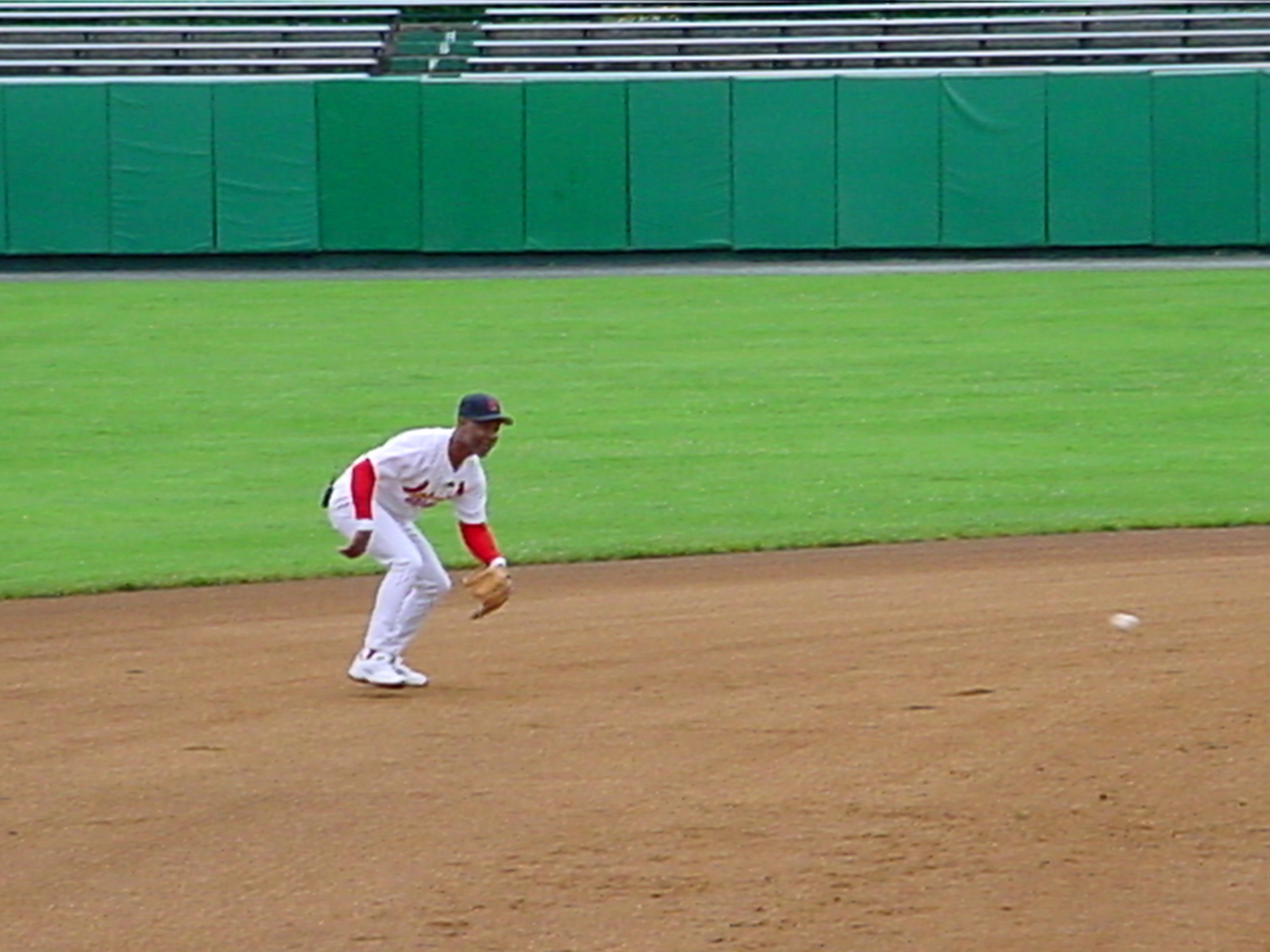
Smith fields a ground ball at Doubleday Field in 2002.

On January 8, 2002, Smith learned via a phone call he had been elected to the Baseball Hall of Fame on his first ballot by receiving 91.7% of the votes cast. As it happened, the Olympic torch was passing through St. Louis on its way to Salt Lake City for the 2002 Winter Olympics, and Smith served as a torchbearer in a ceremony with St. Louis Rams' quarterback Kurt Warner that evening. Smith was inducted into the Hall of Fame during ceremonies on July 28, 2002. During his speech, he compared his baseball experiences with the characters from the novel The Wonderful Wizard of Oz, after which his son Dustin presented his Hall of Fame plaque. Days later on August 11, Smith was back at Busch Memorial Stadium for the unveiling of a statue in his likeness made by sculptor Harry Weber. Weber chose to emphasize Smith's defensive skills by showing Smith stretched horizontal to the ground while fielding a baseball. At the ceremony Weber told Smith, "You spent half of your career up in the air. That makes it difficult for a sculptor to do something with it."

Smith has also been an entrepreneur in a variety of business ventures. Smith opened "Ozzie's" restaurant and sports bar in 1988, started a youth sports academy in 1990, became an investor in a grocery store chain in 1999, and partnered with David Slay to open a restaurant in the early 2000s. Of those businesses the youth academy remains in operation, with the restaurant having closed in 2010 after changing ownership and locations once. Aside from appearing in numerous radio and television commercials in the St. Louis area since retiring from baseball, Smith authored a children's book in 2006 and launched his own brand of salad dressing in 2008.

Besides the National Baseball Hall of Fame, Smith has also been inducted or honored in other halls of fame and recognitions. In 1999, he ranked number 87 on The Sporting News' list of the 100 Greatest Baseball Players, and finished third in voting at shortstop for the Major League Baseball All-Century Team. He was honored with induction into the Missouri Sports Hall of Fame, Alabama Sports Hall of Fame and the St. Louis Walk of Fame, and received an honorary Doctor of Humane Letters degree from Cal Poly. In January 2014, the Cardinals announced Smith among 22 former players and personnel to be inducted into the St. Louis Cardinals Hall of Fame and Museum for the inaugural class of 2014.

In March 2023, Smith returned to his alma mater, as his statue in Baggett Stadium was rededicated as part of Ozzie Smith Plaza at the facility's entrance.

Smith, who has served as president of the Gateway PGA REACH Foundation in St. Louis since 2010, has been helping grow the game of golf - especially with youth. The Golf Course Superintendents Association of America honored Smith with its highest honor in 2025, the Old Tom Morris Award.

== Career MLB statistics ==
=== Hitting ===
Category	G	AB	R	H	2B	3B	HR	RBI	BB	SB	SO	AVG	OBP	SLG
Statistic	2,573	9,396	1,257	2,460	402	69	28	793	1,072	580	589	.262	.337	.328

=== Fielding ===
Category	G	PO	A	E	CH	DP	FP	RF/9	Innings
Statistic	2,511	4,249	8,375	281	12,624	1,590	.978	5.22	21,785.67

== Personal life ==
Smith is the father to three children from his marriage to former wife Denise: sons Nikko and Dustin, and daughter Taryn. Nikko cracked the top ten finalists of the 2005 edition of American Idol. In 2012, Smith made news headlines again, when he sold all of his Gold Gloves at auction together for more than $500,000.

Smith still lives in and remains a visible figure around St. Louis, making varied appearances like playing the role of the Wizard in the St. Louis Municipal Opera's summer 2001 production of The Wizard of Oz. He is the host of Cardinals Insider, a weekly news magazine television show about the club. Since 2016, he has opened five regenerative medicine clinics around Missouri.

== See also ==
- List of Major League Baseball career stolen bases leaders
- List of Major League Baseball career games played leaders
- List of Major League Baseball career doubles leaders
- List of Major League Baseball career runs scored leaders
- List of Major League Baseball career hits leaders
- List of St. Louis Cardinals team records
