= List of Gold Glove Award winners at shortstop =

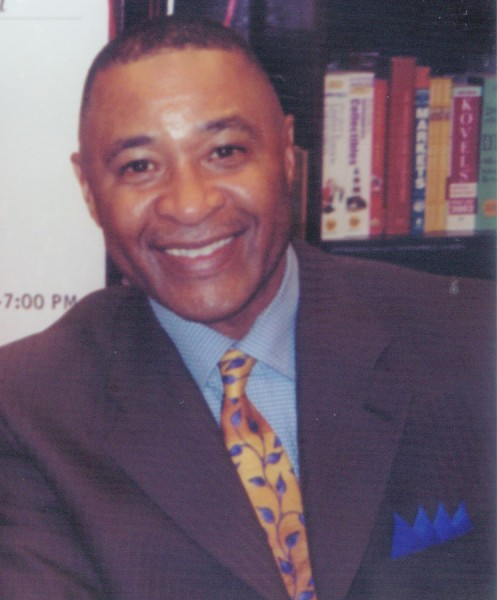
Ozzie Smith has won 13 Gold Glove Awards at shortstop, tying him for the third-highest total among winners at all positions.

The Rawlings Gold Glove Award, usually referred to as the Gold Glove, is the award given annually to the Major League Baseball players judged to have exhibited superior individual fielding performances at each fielding position in both the National League (NL) and the American League (AL), as voted by the managers and coaches in each league. Managers are not permitted to vote for their own players. Eighteen Gold Gloves are awarded each year (with the exception of 1957, 1985, 2007, and 2018), one at each of the nine positions in each league. In 1957, the baseball glove manufacturer Rawlings created the Gold Glove Award to commemorate the best fielding performance at each position. The award was created from a glove made from gold lamé-tanned leather and affixed to a walnut base. Initially, only one Gold Glove per position was awarded to the top fielder at each position in the entire league; however, separate awards were given for the National and American Leagues beginning in 1958.

Ozzie Smith, known as "the Wizard of Oz", has won the most Gold Glove Awards at shortstop; he captured 13 awards in his 19 seasons with the St. Louis Cardinals. Omar Vizquel is second among shortstops with 11 wins; he won two with the San Francisco Giants in the National League after winning nine with the Seattle Mariners and the Cleveland Indians in the American League. Luis Aparicio won nine times at shortstop for the third-highest total, followed by Mark Belanger with eight wins. Dave Concepción and Derek Jeter have won five awards; four-time winners at shortstop include Brandon Crawford, Tony Fernández, Jimmy Rollins, Andrelton Simmons and Alan Trammell. Hall of Famers who have won Gold Glove Awards at shortstop include Smith, Aparicio, Trammell, Ernie Banks, Robin Yount, Barry Larkin and Cal Ripken Jr., whose 2,632 consecutive games played earned him his "Iron Man" nickname.

Vizquel and J. P. Crawford made the fewest errors during a shortstop's winning season, with three in 2000 and 2020 respectively. Vizquel's .995 fielding percentage that season leads American League and major league shortstops, and his 2006 total of four errors is tied for the National League lead with Rey Ordóñez (1999). Ordóñez' .994 fielding percentage in 1999 leads National Leaguers in that category. Aparicio leads winners in putouts, with 305 in 1960; Concepción (1976) and Smith (1983) are tied for the National League lead with 304. Smith's 621 assists are best among all shortstops, and Belanger (552 assists in 1974) is the American League leader. Gene Alley turned 128 double plays in 1966 to lead winners in that category; Ripken leads American Leaguers, with 119 turned in 1992.

== Key ==
Year	Links to the corresponding Major League Baseball season
PO	Putout
A	Assist
E	Error
DP	Double play
FPct	Fielding percentage
* or **	Winner of the most Gold Glove Awards at his position (** indicates tie)
†	Member of the National Baseball Hall of Fame and Museum

== American League winners ==
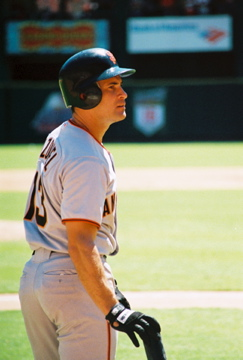
Omar Vizquel 1993–2001 AL Gold Glove winner (2005–2006 NL Gold Glove winner)

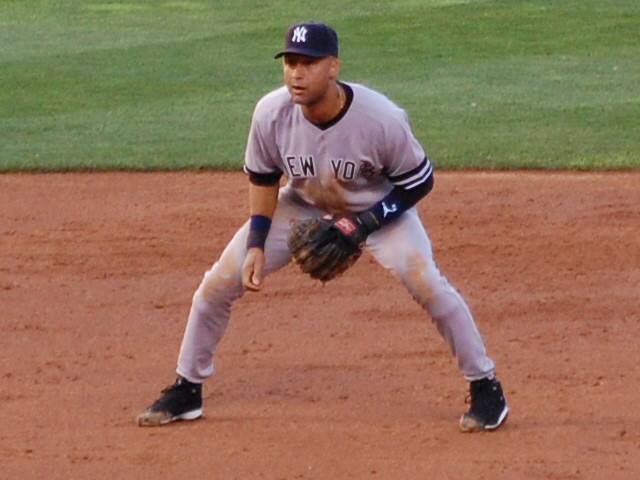
Derek Jeter (2004–2006, 2009–2010 AL Gold Glove winner)

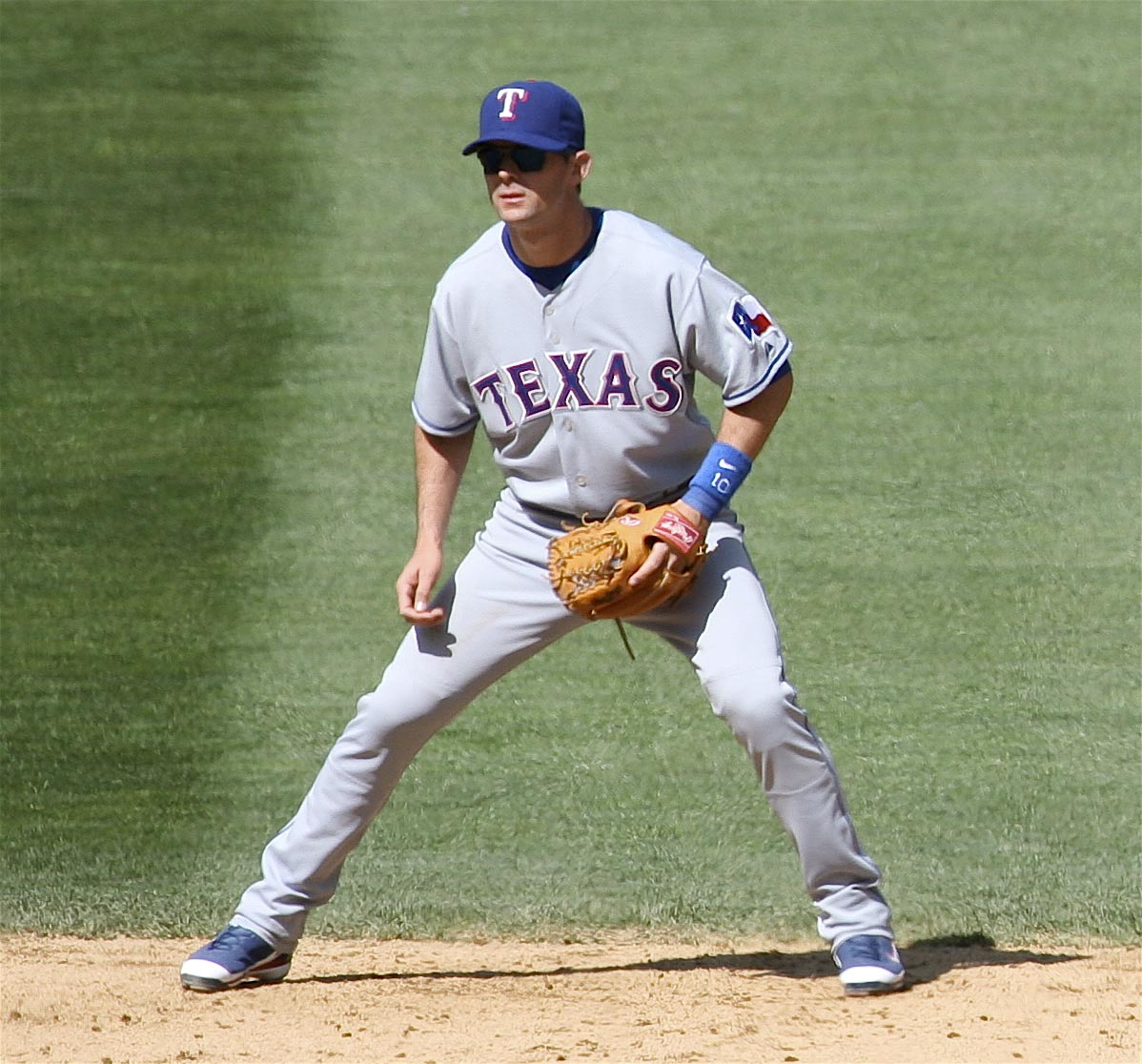
Michael Young (2008 AL Gold Glove winner)

Year	Player	Team	PO	A	E	DP	FPct	Ref
1957^{[a]}	Roy McMillan	Cincinnati Redlegs (NL)	253	418	16	86	.977	
1958	Luis Aparicio^{†}	Chicago White Sox	289	463	21	90	.973	
1959	Luis Aparicio^{†}	Chicago White Sox	282	460	23	87	.970	
1960	Luis Aparicio^{†}	Chicago White Sox	305	551	18	117	.979	
1961	Luis Aparicio^{†}	Chicago White Sox	264	487	30	86	.962	
1962	Luis Aparicio^{†}	Chicago White Sox	280	452	20	102	.973	
1963	Zoilo Versalles	Minnesota Twins	301	448	30	87	.961	
1964	Luis Aparicio^{†}	Baltimore Orioles	260	437	15	98	.979	
1965	Zoilo Versalles	Minnesota Twins	248	487	39	105	.950	
1966	Luis Aparicio^{†}	Baltimore Orioles	303	441	17	104	.978	
1967	Jim Fregosi	California Angels	258	435	25	73	.965	
1968	Luis Aparicio^{†}	Chicago White Sox	269	535	19	92	.977	
1969	Mark Belanger	Baltimore Orioles	251	449	23	79	.968	
1970	Luis Aparicio^{†}	Chicago White Sox	251	483	18	99	.976	
1971	Mark Belanger	Baltimore Orioles	280	443	16	77	.978	
1972	Ed Brinkman	Detroit Tigers	233	495	7	81	.990	
1973	Mark Belanger	Baltimore Orioles	241	530	23	100	.971	
1974	Mark Belanger	Baltimore Orioles	243	552	13	100	.984	
1975	Mark Belanger	Baltimore Orioles	259	508	17	105	.978	
1976	Mark Belanger	Baltimore Orioles	239	545	14	97	.982	
1977	Mark Belanger	Baltimore Orioles	244	417	10	82	.985	
1978	Mark Belanger	Baltimore Orioles	184	409	9	76	.985	
1979	Rick Burleson	Boston Red Sox	272	523	16	109	.980	
1980	Alan Trammell^{†}	Detroit Tigers	225	412	13	89	.980	
1981	Alan Trammell^{†}	Detroit Tigers	181	347	9	65	.983	
1982	Robin Yount^{†}	Milwaukee Brewers	253	489	24	95	.969	
1983	Alan Trammell^{†}	Detroit Tigers	236	367	13	71	.979	
1984	Alan Trammell^{†}	Detroit Tigers	180	314	10	71	.980	
1985	Alfredo Griffin	Oakland Athletics	278	440	30	87	.960	
1986	Tony Fernández	Toronto Blue Jays	294	445	13	103	.983	
1987	Tony Fernández	Toronto Blue Jays	270	396	14	88	.979	
1988	Tony Fernández	Toronto Blue Jays	247	470	14	106	.981	
1989	Tony Fernández	Toronto Blue Jays	260	475	6	93	.992	
1990	Ozzie Guillén	Chicago White Sox	252	474	17	100	.977	
1991	Cal Ripken Jr.^{†}	Baltimore Orioles	267	528	11	114	.986	
1992	Cal Ripken Jr.^{†}	Baltimore Orioles	287	445	12	119	.984	
1993	Omar Vizquel	Seattle Mariners	245	475	15	108	.980	
1994	Omar Vizquel	Cleveland Indians	113	204	6	54	.981	
1995	Omar Vizquel	Cleveland Indians	210	405	9	84	.986	
1996	Omar Vizquel	Cleveland Indians	226	447	20	91	.971	
1997	Omar Vizquel	Cleveland Indians	245	429	10	98	.985	
1998	Omar Vizquel	Cleveland Indians	273	442	5	94	.993	
1999	Omar Vizquel	Cleveland Indians	221	396	15	88	.976	
2000	Omar Vizquel	Cleveland Indians	231	416	3	99	.995	
2001	Omar Vizquel	Cleveland Indians	219	414	7	88	.989	
2002	Alex Rodriguez	Texas Rangers	259	472	10	108	.987	
2003	Alex Rodriguez	Texas Rangers	227	464	8	111	.989	
2004	Derek Jeter^{†}	New York Yankees	273	392	13	96	.981	
2005	Derek Jeter^{†}	New York Yankees	262	454	15	96	.979	
2006	Derek Jeter^{†}	New York Yankees	214	381	15	81	.975	
2007	Orlando Cabrera	Los Angeles Angels of Anaheim	239	415	11	104	.983	
2008	Michael Young	Texas Rangers	193	465	11	113	.984	
2009	Derek Jeter^{†}	New York Yankees	206	340	8	75	.986	
2010	Derek Jeter^{†}	New York Yankees	182	365	6	94	.989	
2011	Erick Aybar	Los Angeles Angels of Anaheim	240	406	13	102	.980	
2012	J. J. Hardy	Baltimore Orioles	244	529	6	113	.992	
2013	J. J. Hardy	Baltimore Orioles	230	403	12	108	.981	
2014	J. J. Hardy	Baltimore Orioles	187	394	13	99	.978	
2015	Alcides Escobar	Kansas City Royals	217	417	13	80	.980	
2016	Francisco Lindor	Cleveland Indians	215	447	12	83	.982	
2017	Andrelton Simmons	Los Angeles Angels	235	436	14	99	.980	
2018	Andrelton Simmons	Los Angeles Angels	228	372	10	114	.984	
2019	Francisco Lindor	Cleveland Indians	159	312	10	68	.979	
2020	J. P. Crawford	Seattle Mariners	73	145	3	31	.986	
2021	Carlos Correa	Houston Astros	183	384	11	70	.981	
2022	Jeremy Peña	Houston Astros	146	347	19	64	.963	
2023	Anthony Volpe	New York Yankees	186	357	17	63	.970	
2024	Bobby Witt Jr.	Kansas City Royals	207	361	15	78	.974	
2025	Bobby Witt Jr.	Kansas City Royals	186	382	10	74	.983	
2026	Taylor Walls	Tampa Bay Rays	177	280	9	49	.981	

== National League winners ==
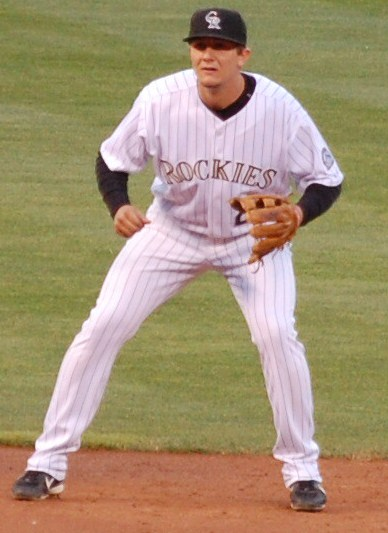
Troy Tulowitzki (2010-2011 NL Gold Glove winner)

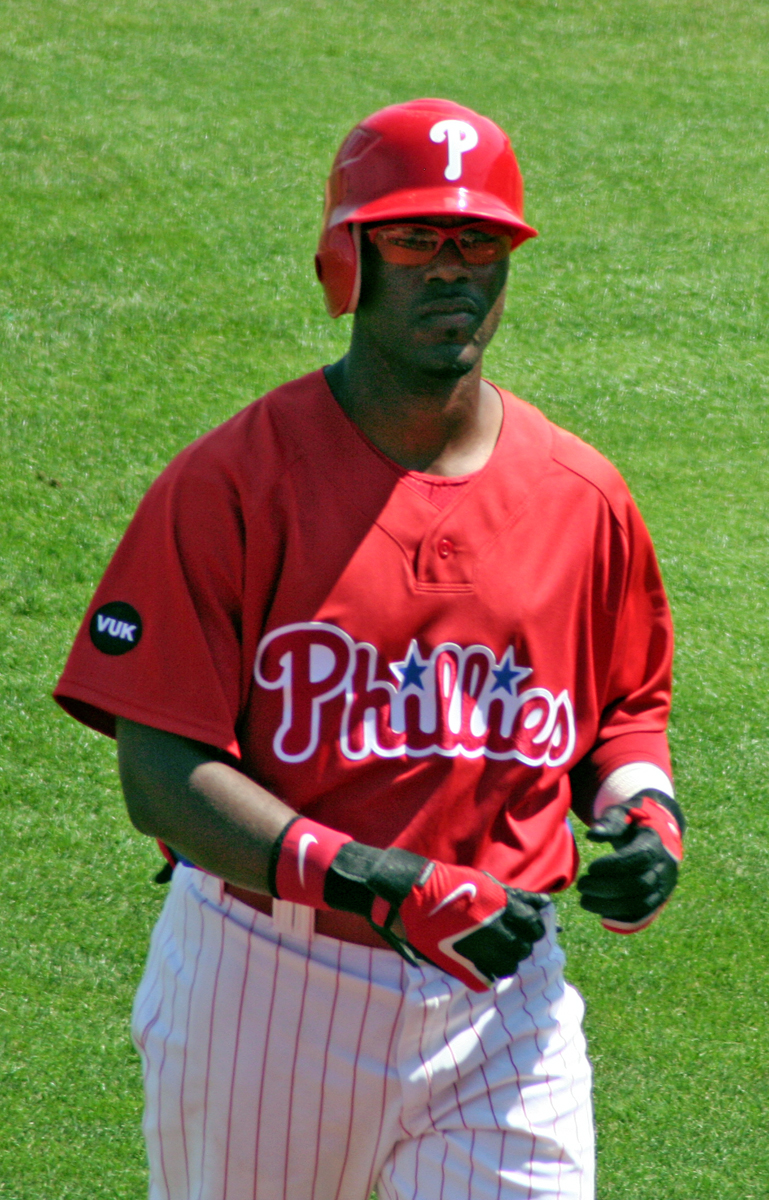
Jimmy Rollins (2007–2009, 2012 NL Gold Glove winner)

Year	Player	Team	PO	A	E	DP	FPct	Ref
1957^{[b]}	Roy McMillan	Cincinnati Redlegs	253	418	16	86	.977	
1958	Roy McMillan	Cincinnati Redlegs	278	394	14	81	.980	
1959	Roy McMillan	Cincinnati Redlegs	163	205	10	50	.974	
1960	Ernie Banks^{†}	Chicago Cubs	283	488	18	94	.977	
1961	Maury Wills	Los Angeles Dodgers	253	428	29	104	.959	
1962	Maury Wills	Los Angeles Dodgers	295	493	36	86	.956	
1963	Bobby Wine	Philadelphia Phillies	220	359	17	73	.971	
1964	Rubén Amaro, Sr.	Philadelphia Phillies	141	191	10	44	.971	
1965	Leo Cárdenas	Cincinnati Reds	292	440	19	92	.975	
1966	Gene Alley	Pittsburgh Pirates	235	472	15	128	.979	
1967	Gene Alley	Pittsburgh Pirates	257	500	26	105	.967	
1968	Dal Maxvill	St. Louis Cardinals	232	458	22	81	.969	
1969	Don Kessinger	Chicago Cubs	266	542	20	101	.976	
1970	Don Kessinger	Chicago Cubs	257	501	22	86	.972	
1971	Bud Harrelson	New York Mets	257	441	16	86	.978	
1972	Larry Bowa	Philadelphia Phillies	212	494	9	88	.987	
1973	Roger Metzger	Houston Astros	231	429	12	83	.982	
1974	Dave Concepción	Cincinnati Reds	239	536	30	99	.963	
1975	Dave Concepción	Cincinnati Reds	238	445	16	102	.977	
1976	Dave Concepción	Cincinnati Reds	304	506	27	93	.968	
1977	Dave Concepción	Cincinnati Reds	280	490	11	101	.986	
1978	Larry Bowa	Philadelphia Phillies	224	502	10	87	.986	
1979	Dave Concepción	Cincinnati Reds	284	495	27	102	.967	
1980	Ozzie Smith*^{†}	San Diego Padres	288	621	24	113	.974	
1981	Ozzie Smith*^{†}	San Diego Padres	220	422	16	72	.976	
1982	Ozzie Smith*^{†}	St. Louis Cardinals	279	535	13	101	.984	
1983	Ozzie Smith*^{†}	St. Louis Cardinals	304	519	21	100	.975	
1984	Ozzie Smith*^{†}	St. Louis Cardinals	233	437	12	94	.982	
1985	Ozzie Smith*^{†}	St. Louis Cardinals	264	549	14	111	.983	
1986	Ozzie Smith*^{†}	St. Louis Cardinals	229	453	15	96	.978	
1987	Ozzie Smith*^{†}	St. Louis Cardinals	245	516	10	111	.987	
1988	Ozzie Smith*^{†}	St. Louis Cardinals	234	519	22	79	.972	
1989	Ozzie Smith*^{†}	St. Louis Cardinals	209	483	17	73	.976	
1990	Ozzie Smith*^{†}	St. Louis Cardinals	212	378	12	66	.980	
1991	Ozzie Smith*^{†}	St. Louis Cardinals	244	387	8	79	.987	
1992	Ozzie Smith*^{†}	St. Louis Cardinals	232	420	10	82	.985	
1993	Jay Bell	Pittsburgh Pirates	256	527	11	100	.986	
1994	Barry Larkin^{†}	Cincinnati Reds	178	312	10	62	.980	
1995	Barry Larkin^{†}	Cincinnati Reds	192	341	11	72	.980	
1996	Barry Larkin^{†}	Cincinnati Reds	230	426	17	80	.975	
1997	Rey Ordóñez	New York Mets	171	355	9	71	.983	
1998	Rey Ordóñez	New York Mets	265	401	17	82	.975	
1999	Rey Ordóñez	New York Mets	220	416	4	91	.994	
2000	Neifi Pérez	Colorado Rockies	288	524	18	120	.978	
2001	Orlando Cabrera	Montreal Expos	246	515	11	106	.986	
2002	Edgar Rentería	St. Louis Cardinals	202	410	19	72	.970	
2003	Edgar Rentería	St. Louis Cardinals	191	439	16	83	.975	
2004	César Izturis	Los Angeles Dodgers	234	430	10	96	.985	
2005	Omar Vizquel	San Francisco Giants	234	426	8	80	.988	
2006	Omar Vizquel	San Francisco Giants	205	389	4	86	.993	
2007	Jimmy Rollins	Philadelphia Phillies	227	479	11	110	.985	
2008	Jimmy Rollins	Philadelphia Phillies	193	393	7	71	.988	
2009	Jimmy Rollins	Philadelphia Phillies	212	389	6	72	.990	
2010	Troy Tulowitzki	Colorado Rockies	211	388	10	103	.984	
2011	Troy Tulowitzki	Colorado Rockies	261	417	6	98	.991	
2012	Jimmy Rollins	Philadelphia Phillies	204	377	13	74	.978	
2013	Andrelton Simmons	Atlanta Braves	240	499	14	94	.981	
2014	Andrelton Simmons	Atlanta Braves	217	411	14	99	.978	
2015	Brandon Crawford	San Francisco Giants	191	427	13	89	.979	
2016	Brandon Crawford	San Francisco Giants	209	413	11	90	.983	
2017	Brandon Crawford	San Francisco Giants	221	374	11	85	.982	
2018	Nick Ahmed	Arizona Diamondbacks	165	432	9	98	.985	
2019	Nick Ahmed	Arizona Diamondbacks	207	412	13	79	.979	
2020	Javier Báez	Chicago Cubs	86	159	8	34	.968	
2021	Brandon Crawford	San Francisco Giants	168	340	9	68	.983	
2022	Dansby Swanson	Atlanta Braves	193	391	8	77	.986	
2023	Dansby Swanson	Chicago Cubs	187	382	11	72	.981	
2024	Ezequiel Tovar	Colorado Rockies	233	435	8	113	.988	
2025	Masyn Winn	St. Louis Cardinals	163	335	3	64	.994	
2026	Geraldo Perdomo	Arizona Diamondbacks	248	362	8	94	.987	

== Footnotes ==
- ^{a} ^{b} In 1957, Gold Gloves were given to the top fielders in Major League Baseball, instead of separate awards for the National and American Leagues; therefore, the winners are the same in each table.

== See also ==
- Gold Glove middle infield duos
