= Gene Alley =

American baseball player (born 1940)

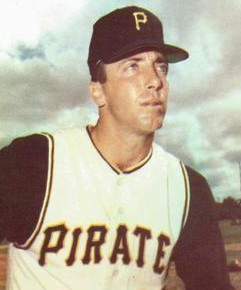
- Alley in 1966
- Shortstop
- Born: July 10, 1940 (age 86); Richmond, Virginia, U.S.
- Batted: Right Threw: Right

MLB debut
- September 4, 1963, for the Pittsburgh Pirates

Last MLB appearance
- September 27, 1973, for the Pittsburgh Pirates

MLB statistics
- Batting average: .254
- Home runs: 55
- Runs batted in: 342
- Stats at Baseball Reference

Teams
- Pittsburgh Pirates (1963–1973)

Career highlights and awards
- 2× All-Star (1967, 1968); World Series champion (1971); 2× Gold Glove Award (1966, 1967)

Leonard Eugene Alley (born July 10, 1940) is an American former professional baseball player. He spent his entire career in Major League Baseball as a shortstop for the Pittsburgh Pirates from 1963 through 1973. A two-time All-Star who was widely acclaimed to be the best all-around shortstop in the majors for two seasons (1966-67) before a recurring right shoulder problem reduced his effectiveness, Alley was a member of Pirates teams that won three consecutive National League Eastern Division titles between 1970 and 1972 and the World Series in 1971.

A contact hitter with occasional power, Alley handled the bat well. He was an excellent bunter and adept at the hit-and-run maneuver. In the field, he had plus range and quickness as well as an accurate throwing arm. In the 1966 season, he took part in 128 double plays, third most in major league history and one short of the National League record at the time.

== Early life ==
Alley was born on July 10, 1940, in Richmond, Virginia. While still an infant, Alley's father died in a car accident, and he and his three siblings were raised by his mother. He attended Hermitage High School in Henrico, Virginia. Alley had hoped to receive a basketball scholarship to attend the University of Virginia, but the sum offered was insufficient. Instead, the 18-year old Alley signed to play baseball with the Pittsburgh Pirates.

== Professional baseball career ==
=== Minor leagues ===
In 1959, the Pirates assigned Alley to the Dubuque Packers of the Class-D Midwest League. He had a .287 batting average (his highest in the minor leagues) with 15 home runs, and a .922 fielding percentage at shortstop, his principal position. Because of a recurring problem with his throwing arm, he did not play shortstop for the next three years.

Alley remained in the Pirates minor league system until 1963, playing third base in 1960 (.932 fielding percentage), and second base in 1961 (.933 fielding percentage) and 1962 (.969 combined fielding percentage between Single-A and Triple-A baseball). In 1963, he was promoted Triple-A baseball with the Columbus Jets of the International League. He played exclusively at shortstop, where he had a .963 fielding percentage along with a .244 batting average, 19 home runs, 61 runs batted in (RBI) and 76 runs scored in 146 games.

=== Pittsburgh Pirates ===
Alley played briefly for the Pirates at the end of the 1963 season, and then played in 81 games for the Pirates in 1964, hitting only .211, but with a fielding percentage at shortstop of .966 in 61 games at that position. He was a frequent backup to starting shortstop Ducky Schofield.

In 1965, he started 40 games at second base for the injured Bill Mazeroski, and then 102 games at shortstop after Mazeroski's return. He had a .968 fielding percentage at shortstop and .974 at second base. He hit .252, with five home runs, 47 runs and 47 RBIs. He was fourth in the NL in fielding percentage by a shortstop.

1966 was his first full year at shortstop. He had a .979 fielding percentage (second in the league behind Chico Cardénas' .980), and led all National League shortstops in turning double plays with 128. He received the Gold Glove Award for NL shortstops. In the same year, Mazeroski set the all-time double play record for second basemen in a season with 161. The Pirates as a team turned 215 double plays, the second most in baseball history after the record 217 set by the 1949 Philadelphia Athletics (as of 2023). Alley also hit for a career high .299 batting average, had a career high with 88 runs scored, and his 20 sacrifice hits were second in the NL.

In 1967, Alley led the league's shortstops again in double plays with 105, as well as leading the league's shortstops in putouts (257) and was second in assists (500). He was fifth in fielding percentage. He again won the Gold Glove Award. He was also selected to the NL All-Star team for the first time. He batted .287, and had a career high 55 RBIs.

Alley made the NL All-Star a second time in 1968. From 1965 to 1968 he was in the top four NL players in assists. In 1966 and 1967, The Sporting News named him to its All-Star Team. Alley and Mazeroski both received Gold Glove Awards in 1966 and 1967, along with their teammate Roberto Clemente. They also joined a select list of eight shortstop-second baseman duos to each win a Gold Glove the same season more than once while playing together.

Alley was on Pirates teams that won their division in 1970 through 1972, and had the NL's best record in 1971 and 1972. They lost in the NL championship series to the Cincinnati Reds twice (1970, 1972), but defeated the San Francisco Giants in 1971, and went on to win the World Series against the Baltimore Orioles (Alley only appearing in one playoff game and two games of the World Series, having suffered a knee injury).

Shoulder and knee problems ultimately ended Alley's career early. Alley developed a sore throwing arm shortly before the 1967 All-Star Game that never fully healed. In 1969, he played only 82 games and was on the disabled list for 29 days, though he still had a .977 fielding percentage and 21-game hitting streak. He originally injured his knee in 1969 when he suffered a collision on a play while covering first base in a game against the Houston Astros, leading to multiple surgeries. A knee injury suffered late in the 1971 season subsequently required surgery, and limited his participation in the 1971 postseason playoffs and World Series.

On September 2, 1970, Alley hit an inside-the-park grand slam at Jarry Park Stadium in Montreal, against the Montreal Expos. With the bases loaded, facing Carl Morton, Alley hit a line drive which landed in front of center fielder Boots Day, who slipped on the wet grass. The ball rolled all the way to the wall in deepest center field, and all the baserunners and Alley scored.

1973 was his final year, appearing in 76 games altogether, and 56 in the field at either shortstop or third base.

== Post-baseball life ==
Alley worked for a printing company in Richmond after his retirement from baseball.

In 1998, Alley was inducted into the Virginia Sports Hall of Fame. In 2013, he received the Paul Keyes RBI (Richmond Baseball Impact) Award, given annually to a person making a significant contribution to baseball within or around the Richmond community.

== See also ==
- List of Gold Glove middle infield duos
- List of Major League Baseball players who spent their entire career with one franchise
